= 2025–26 Fordham Rams men's basketball team =

American college basketball season

2025–26 Fordham Rams men's basketball
- Conference: Atlantic 10 Conference
- Record: 17–15 (8–10 A–10)
- Head coach: Mike Magpayo (1st season)
- Associate head coach: Troy Hammel
- Assistant coaches: Kevin Smith; Derrick Phelps; Ryan Hyland; Matt Hurwitz
- Home arena: Rose Hill Gymnasium

2025–26 Atlantic 10 men's basketball standings
	Conf.				Overall
Team	W		L	PCT	W		L	PCT
Saint Louis	15	–	3	.833	29	–	6	.829
VCU †	15	–	3	.833	28	–	8	.778
Saint Joseph's	13	–	5	.722	24	–	12	.667
Dayton	12	–	6	.667	25	–	12	.676
George Mason	11	–	7	.611	23	–	10	.697
Davidson	10	–	8	.556	20	–	14	.588
Duquesne	9	–	9	.500	18	–	15	.545
Fordham	8	–	10	.444	17	–	15	.531
George Washington	8	–	10	.444	19	–	16	.543
Rhode Island	7	–	11	.389	16	–	16	.500
Richmond	5	–	13	.278	15	–	17	.469
La Salle	5	–	13	.278	9	–	23	.281
St. Bonaventure	4	–	14	.222	17	–	17	.500
Loyola Chicago	4	–	14	.222	9	–	24	.273
† 2026 A-10 tournament winner

The 2025–26 Fordham Rams men's basketball team represented Fordham University during the 2025–26 NCAA Division I men's basketball season. The Rams, led by first-year head coach Mike Magpayo, played their home games at Rose Hill Gymnasium in The Bronx, New York as a member of the Atlantic 10 Conference.

== Previous season ==
The Rams finished their 2024–25 season with a 12–21 record, going 3–15 in conference play to finish in last place. Fordham upset Rhode Island in the first-round of the A-10 tournament before losing to George Washington in the second-round.

Following the season on March 20, 2025, Fordham fired head coach Keith Urgo after three years in response to an NCAA investigation. Nine days later, Mike Magpayo was announced as the new head coach for the 2025–26 season. On April 23, 2025, the NCAA handed down sanctions against the basketball team in response to recruiting violations. The punishment included three years of probation and a $35,000 fine. Urgo along with two administrators were given show-cause penalties.

== Offseason ==
=== Departures ===
Name	Number	Pos.	Height	Weight	Year	Hometown	Reason for departure
Japhet Medor	0	G	6' 0"	165	GS Senior	Wellington, FL	Graduated
Will Richardson	1	G	6' 3"	170	Junior	Teaneck, NJ	Transferred to Albany
Romad Dean	2	F	6' 7"	210	Junior	Freeport, Bahamas	Transferred to Tulsa
Jahmere Tripp	3	G/F	6' 6"	230	Sophomore	Brooklyn, NY	Transferred to Rhode Island
Jaden Smith	4	C	6' 11"	220	Freshman	Chicago, IL	Transferred to Saint Joseph's
Joshua Rivera	5	F	6' 6"	215	Junior	New Brunswick, NJ	Transferred to Seton Hall
Aleksander Pachucki	12	G	6' 5"	180	Freshman	Toronto, ON	Transferred to Bucknell
Zach Riley	13	G	6' 5"	195	Senior	Auckland, New Zealand	Graduated
Jackie Johnson III	15	G	5' 11"	185	Senior	Wichita, KS	Graduated
Brian Nussbaum	22	G	6' 2"	185	Senior	South Salem, NY	Walk-on; graduated
Matt Zona	25	F	6' 9"	250	GS Senior	Blauvelt, NY	Graduated
Abdou Tsimbila	30	F	6' 9"	245	GS Senior	Yaoundé, Cameroon	Graduated

=== Incoming transfers ===
Name	Number	Pos.	Height	Weight	Year	Hometown	Previous school
Abass Bodija	0	F	6' 10"	225	RS Freshman	Brisbane, Australia	UC Riverside
Zarique Nutter	1	F	6' 7"	210	GS Senior	Newark, NJ	Georgia State
Dejour Reaves	2	G	6' 0"	175	GS Senior	Syracuse, NY	Iona
Jack Whitbourn	3	C	6' 11"	250	Sophomore	Melbourne, Australia	UC Riverside
Marcus Greene	4	G	6' 2"	195	GS Senior	Gilroy, CA	Hawaii
Rikus Schulte	12	F	6' 9"	240	Junior	Münster, Germany	UC Riverside
Akira Jacobs	13	F	6' 10"	230	Junior	Yokohama, Japan	Hawaii
Christian Henry	30	G	6' 3"	195	Senior	Chicago, IL	Eastern Michigan
Louis Lesmond	77	G	6' 6"	195	GS Senior	Paris, France	Harvard

==== 2025 recruiting class ====
College recruiting
Name	Hometown	School	Height	Weight	Commit date
Roor Akhuar; F	Melbourne, Australia	Center of Excellence	6 ft 7 in (2.01 m)	205 lb (93 kg)	
Roor Akhuar; F	Recruit ratings: No ratings found				
Troy Henderson; PG	Richmond, VA	John Marshall High School	6 ft 1 in (1.85 m)	180 lb (82 kg)	Aug 2, 2024
Troy Henderson; PG	Recruit ratings: No ratings found				
Overall recruit ranking:
Note: In many cases, Scout, Rivals, 247Sports, On3, and ESPN may conflict in their listings of height and weight.; In these cases, the average was taken. ESPN grades are on a 100-point scale.; Sources: "2025 Team Ranking". Rivals.

==== 2026 recruiting class ====
College recruiting (2026)
Name	Hometown	School	Height	Weight	Commit date
Overall recruit ranking:
Note: In many cases, Scout, Rivals, 247Sports, On3, and ESPN may conflict in their listings of height and weight.; In these cases, the average was taken. ESPN grades are on a 100-point scale.; Sources: "2026 Team Ranking". Rivals.

== Roster ==
2025–26 Fordham Rams men's basketball team
Players
Coaches

Pos.	#	Name	Height	Weight	Year	Previous school	Hometown
F	0	Abass Bodija	6 ft 10 in (2.08 m)	225 lb (102 kg)	RS Fr	UC Riverside	Brisbane, Australia
F	1	Zarique Nutter	6 ft 7 in (2.01 m)	210 lb (95 kg)	GS	Georgia State	Newark, NJ
G	2	Dejour Reaves	6 ft 0 in (1.83 m)	175 lb (79 kg)	GS	Iona	Syracuse, NY
C	3	Jack Whitbourn	6 ft 11 in (2.11 m)	250 lb (113 kg)	So	UC Riverside	Melbourne, Australia
G	4	Marcus Greene	6 ft 2 in (1.88 m)	195 lb (88 kg)	GS	Hawaii	Gilroy, CA
G	8	Ryan Pettis	6 ft 4 in (1.93 m)	185 lb (84 kg)	So	Junípero Serra	East Palo Alto, CA
G	10	Kingston Price	6 ft 2 in (1.88 m)	180 lb (82 kg)	So	Severn School	Bowie, MD
F	12	Rikus Schulte	6 ft 9 in (2.06 m)	240 lb (109 kg)	Jr	UC Riverside	Münster, Germany
F	13	Akira Jacobs	6 ft 10 in (2.08 m)	230 lb (104 kg)	Jr	Hawaii	Yokohama, Japan
F	14	Roor Akhuar	6 ft 7 in (2.01 m)	205 lb (93 kg)	Fr	Center of Excellence	Melbourne, Australia
G	17	Jameson O'Toole (W)	6 ft 3 in (1.91 m)	200 lb (91 kg)	Jr	St. Thomas More	Pittsburgh, PA
G	21	Aidan Crotty (W)	5 ft 11 in (1.8 m)	165 lb (75 kg)	So	Fairfield Prep	Fairfield, CT
G	23	Max Miller (W)	6 ft 0 in (1.83 m)	165 lb (75 kg)	So	Worcester Academy	Rye, NY
G	30	Christian Henry	6 ft 3 in (1.91 m)	195 lb (88 kg)	Sr	Eastern Michigan	Chicago, IL
G	77	Louis Lesmond	6 ft 6 in (1.98 m)	195 lb (88 kg)	GS	Harvard	Paris, France

Head coach

- Mike Magpayo (UC Santa Barbara)

Assistant coach(es)

- Troy Hammel (Merrimack)
- Kevin Smith (Richmond)
- Derrick Phelps (North Carolina)
- Ryan Hyland (Catholic)
- Matt Hurwitz (UCLA)

Legend

- (C) Team captain
- (S) Suspended
- (I) Ineligible
- (W) Walk-on
- Injured
- Current redshirt

Roster
Last update: November 21, 2025

== Schedule and results ==
Date time, TV	Rank^{#}	Opponent^{#}	Result	Record	High points	High rebounds	High assists	Site (attendance) city, state
Non-conference regular season
November 4, 2025*; 7:00 p.m., ESPN+		NJIT	L 61–72	0–1	21 – Reaves	11 – Schulte	3 – Reaves	Rose Hill Gymnasium (1,008); The Bronx, NY
November 7, 2025*; 7:30 p.m., ESPN+		Mount Saint Mary College (D-III)	W 106–37	1–1	19 – Nutter	12 – Bodija	6 – Henry	Rose Hill Gymnasium (726); The Bronx, NY
November 11, 2025*; 7:00 p.m., ESPN+		Wagner	W 63–61	2–1	14 – Schulte	7 – Schulte	6 – Henry	Rose Hill Gymnasium (688); The Bronx, NY
November 14, 2025*; 7:00 p.m., ESPN+		at Iona	L 71–76	2–2	22 – Reaves	10 – Jacobs	6 – Henry	Hynes Athletics Center (2,578); New Rochelle, NY
November 16, 2025*; 4:00 p.m., ESPN+		Manhattanville	W 96–62	3–2	19 – Greene	8 – Schulte	6 – Henry	Rose Hill Gymnasium (649); The Bronx, NY
November 20, 2025*; 7:00 p.m., ESPN+		LIU	W 69–53	4–2	16 – Reaves	12 – Schulte	4 – Tied	Rose Hill Gymnasium (1,020); The Bronx, NY
November 28, 2025*; 5:00 p.m.		vs. Franklin Pierce; Northern Classic	W 74–72	5–2	22 – Reaves	11 – Schulte	6 – Reaves	Place Bell (1,738); Laval, QC
November 29, 2025*; 7:30 p.m., ESPN+		vs. Albany; Northern Classic	W 88–68	6–2	29 – Henry	7 – Tied	7 – Henry	Place Bell (1,867); Laval, QC
November 30, 2025*; 3:30 p.m.		vs. Colgate; Northern Classic	L 62–72	6–3	12 – Bodija	8 – Schulte	8 – Henry	Place Bell (1,767); Laval, QC
December 6, 2025*; 2:00 p.m., ESPN+		Holy Cross	L 69–70	6–4	18 – Henry	10 – Schulte	5 – Reaves	Rose Hill Gymnasium (1,262); The Bronx, NY
December 10, 2025*; 7:00 p.m., YES/ESPN+		Fairleigh Dickinson	W 75–54	7–4	17 – Henry	14 – Schulte	6 – Henry	Rose Hill Gymnasium (604); The Bronx, NY
December 13, 2025*; 2:00 p.m., YES/ESPN+		Manhattan; Battle of the Bronx	W 82–53	8–4	21 – Schulte	10 – Tied	9 – Henry	Rose Hill Gymnasium (1,029); The Bronx, NY
December 22, 2025*; 11:00 a.m., SNY/ESPN+		New Haven	W 65–47	9–4	19 – Reaves	13 – Schulte	3 – Tied	Rose Hill Gymnasium (2,800); The Bronx, NY
Atlantic 10 regular season
December 31, 2025; 2:00 p.m., ESPN+		at Dayton	L 56–63	9–5 (0–1)	18 – Reaves	14 – Schulte	6 – Reaves	UD Arena (13,407); Dayton, OH
January 4, 2026; 12:00 p.m., USA		Richmond	L 75–83	9–6 (0–2)	19 – Reaves	11 – Tied	5 – Tied	Rose Hill Gymnasium (1,643); The Bronx, NY
January 7, 2026; 7:00 p.m., SNY/ESPN+		George Mason	L 58–67	9–7 (0–3)	16 – Reaves	16 – Schulte	5 – Reaves	Rose Hill Gymnasium (577); The Bronx, NY
January 10, 2026; 12:00 p.m., USA		at St. Bonaventure	W 81–77	10–7 (1–3)	31 – Reaves	11 – Whitbourn	9 – Henry	Reilly Center (3,854); St. Bonaventure, NY
January 14, 2026; 8:00 p.m., FDMW/ESPN+		at Saint Louis	L 56–78	10–8 (1–4)	18 – Reaves	14 – Whitbourn	4 – Henry	Chaifetz Arena (6,620); St. Louis, MO
January 17, 2026; 12:30 p.m., USA		Duquesne	L 63–74	10–9 (1–5)	17 – Reaves	15 – Whitbourn	4 – Henry	Rose Hill Gymnasium (1,138); The Bronx, NY
January 21, 2026; 7:00 p.m., ESPN+		at Davidson	L 63–68	10–10 (1–6)	22 – Reaves	9 – Schulte	2 – Tied	Belk Arena (2,546); Davidson, NC
January 28, 2026; 7:00 p.m., SNY/ESPN+		La Salle	W 64–58	11–10 (2–6)	13 – Jacobs	8 – Tied	5 – Henry	Rose Hill Gymnasium (738); The Bronx, NY
January 31, 2026; 2:00 p.m., ESPN+		at George Washington	W 79–65	12–10 (3–6)	19 – Reaves	12 – Whitbourn	6 – Reaves	Charles E. Smith Center (2,526); Washington, D.C.
February 3, 2026; 7:00 p.m., ESPN+		VCU	L 59–63	12–11 (3–7)	21 – Reaves	6 – Schulte	8 – Henry	Rose Hill Gymnasium (1,065); The Bronx, NY
February 7, 2026; 2:00 p.m., ESPN+		St. Bonaventure	L 67–70	12–12 (3–8)	16 – Akhuar	5 – Tied	6 – Tied	Rose Hill Gymnasium (2,175); The Bronx, NY
February 10, 2026; 7:00 p.m., ESPN+		at Saint Joseph's	W 68–64	13–12 (4–8)	19 – Schulte	10 – Bodija	4 – Henry	Michael J. Hagan Arena (2,332); Philadelphia, PA
February 14, 2026; 12:00 p.m., ESPN+		at Rhode Island	W 70–66 ^{OT}	14–12 (5–8)	19 – Reaves	9 – Schulte	4 – Henry	Ryan Center (3,546); Kingston, RI
February 18, 2026; 7:00 p.m., ESPN+		Loyola Chicago	W 62–59	15–12 (6–8)	24 – Reaves	10 – Bodija	4 – Henry	Rose Hill Gymnasium (1,212); The Bronx, NY
February 21, 2026; 2:00 p.m., ESPN+		Davidson	W 63–59	16–12 (7–8)	21 – Reaves	9 – Schulte	6 – Henry	Rose Hill Gymnasium (2,102); The Bronx, NY
February 28, 2026; 12:30 p.m., USA		at VCU	L 63–82	16–13 (7–9)	22 – Reaves	13 – Jacobs	8 – Reaves	Siegel Center (7,637); Richmond, VA
March 4, 2026; 6:30 p.m., ESPN+		at La Salle	L 84–87	16–14 (7–10)	20 – Schulte	11 – Schulte	10 – Henry	John Glaser Arena (1,522); Philadelphia, PA
March 7, 2026; 2:00 p.m., ESPN+		Rhode Island	W 61–49	17–14 (8–10)	17 – Reaves	13 – Schulte	5 – Henry	Rose Hill Gymnasium (2,186); The Bronx, NY
Atlantic 10 tournament
March 12, 2026; 11:30 a.m., USA	(8)	vs. (9) George Washington; Second round	L 62–66	17–15	23 – Reaves	9 – Schulte	4 – Tied	PPG Paints Arena; Philadelphia, PA
*Non-conference game. ^{#}Rankings from AP poll. (#) Tournament seedings in parentheses. All times are in Eastern.
