= 2026 Atlantic 10 men's basketball tournament =

American college basketball postseason tournament

- Classification: Division I
- Season: 2025–26
- Teams: 14
- Site: PPG Paints Arena; Pittsburgh, Pennsylvania
- Champions: VCU (4th title)
- Winning coach: Phil Martelli Jr. (1st title)
- MVP: Terrence Hill Jr. (VCU)
- Television: USA Network, CNBC, CBSSN, CBS

2025–26 Atlantic 10 men's basketball standings
	Conf.				Overall
Team	W		L	PCT	W		L	PCT
Saint Louis	15	–	3	.833	29	–	6	.829
VCU †	15	–	3	.833	28	–	8	.778
Saint Joseph's	13	–	5	.722	24	–	12	.667
Dayton	12	–	6	.667	25	–	12	.676
George Mason	11	–	7	.611	23	–	10	.697
Davidson	10	–	8	.556	20	–	14	.588
Duquesne	9	–	9	.500	18	–	15	.545
Fordham	8	–	10	.444	17	–	15	.531
George Washington	8	–	10	.444	19	–	16	.543
Rhode Island	7	–	11	.389	16	–	16	.500
Richmond	5	–	13	.278	15	–	17	.469
La Salle	5	–	13	.278	9	–	23	.281
St. Bonaventure	4	–	14	.222	17	–	17	.500
Loyola Chicago	4	–	14	.222	9	–	24	.273
† 2026 A-10 tournament winner

The 2026 Atlantic 10 men's basketball tournament was the postseason men's basketball tournament for the 2025–26 season of the Atlantic 10 Conference (A-10). It was held from March 11–15, 2026, in Pittsburgh, Pennsylvania, at the PPG Paints Arena. It was the 50th annual edition of the tournament.

== Seeds ==
All 14 A-10 schools will participate in the tournament. Teams will be seeded by winning percentage within the conference, with a tiebreaker system to seed teams with identical percentages. The top ten teams will receive a first-round bye, and the top four teams will receive a double-bye, automatically advancing them to the quarterfinals.

Seed	School	Conference Record	Tiebreaker
1	Saint Louis	15–3	2–0 vs. VCU
2	VCU	15–3	0–2 vs. Saint Louis
3	Saint Joseph's	13–5	
4	Dayton	12–6	
5	George Mason	11–7	
6	Davidson	10–8	
7	Duquesne	9–9	
8	Fordham	8–10	1–0 vs. George Washington
9	George Washington	8–10	0–1 vs. Fordham
10	Rhode Island	7–11	
11	Richmond	5–13	1–0 vs. La Salle
12	La Salle	5–13	0–1 vs. Richmond
13	St. Bonaventure	4–14	1–0 vs. Loyola Chicago
14	Loyola Chicago	4–14	0–1 vs. St. Bonaventure

== Schedule ==
Session	Game	Time	Matchup	Score	Television	Attendance
First round – Wednesday, March 11
1	1	11:30 a.m.	No. 12 La Salle vs No. 13 St. Bonaventure	80–99	USA Network	4,654
1	2	2:00 p.m.	No. 11 Richmond vs No. 14 Loyola Chicago	67–75	USA Network	4,654
Second round – Thursday, March 12
2	3	11:30 a.m.	No. 8 Fordham vs No. 9 George Washington	62–66	USA Network	5,983
2	4	2:00 p.m.	No. 5 George Mason vs No. 13 St. Bonaventure	57–63	USA Network	5,983
3	5	5:00 p.m.	No. 7 Duquesne vs No. 10 Rhode Island	67–61	USA Network	7,526
3	6	7:30 p.m.	No. 6 Davidson vs No. 14 Loyola Chicago	64–59^{OT}	USA Network	7,526
Quarterfinals – Friday, March 13
4	7	11:30 a.m.	No. 1 Saint Louis vs No. 9 George Washington	88–81	USA Network	7,145
4	8	2:00 p.m.	No. 4 Dayton vs No. 13 St. Bonaventure	68–63	USA Network	7,145
5	9	5:00 p.m.	No. 2 VCU vs No. 7 Duquesne	71–66	USA Network	8,114
5	10	7:30 p.m.	No. 3 Saint Joseph's vs No. 6 Davidson	70–58	CNBC	8,114
Semifinals – Saturday, March 14
6	11	1:00 p.m.	No. 1 Saint Louis vs No. 4 Dayton	69–70	CBSSN	8,523
6	12	3:30 p.m.	No. 2 VCU vs No. 3 Saint Joseph's	77–64	CBSSN	8,523
Championship – Sunday, March 15
7	13	1:00 p.m.	No. 2 VCU vs. No. 4 Dayton	70–62	CBS	9,114
Game times in EST. Rankings denote tournament seed

== Bracket ==
First round Wednesday, March 11; USA Network
12	La Salle	80
13	St. Bonaventure	99
11	Richmond	67
14	Loyola Chicago	75

Second round Thursday, March 12; USA Network
8	Fordham	62
9	George Washington	66
5	George Mason	57
13	St. Bonaventure	63
7	Duquesne	67
10	Rhode Island	61
6	Davidson	64*
14	Loyola Chicago	59

Quarterfinals; Friday, March 13; USA Network/CNBC
1	Saint Louis	88
9	George Washington	81
4	Dayton	68
13	St. Bonaventure	63
2	VCU	71
7	Duquesne	66
3	Saint Joseph's	70
6	Davidson	58

Semifinals; Saturday, March 14; CBSSN
1	Saint Louis	69
4	Dayton	70
2	VCU	77
3	Saint Joseph's	64

Championship; Sunday, March 15; CBS
4	Dayton	62
2	VCU	70

* denotes overtime period

== Awards and Honors ==
=== All-Tournament Team ===
Player	Team
**Terrence Hill Jr.**	VCU
Nyk Lewis	VCU
Robbie Avila	Saint Louis
Javon Bennett	Dayton
Jordan Derkack	Dayton

MVP in bold
