= 2025–26 Davidson Wildcats men's basketball team =

American college basketball season

2025–26 Davidson Wildcats men's basketball

NIT, First Round
- Conference: Atlantic 10 Conference
- Record: 20–14 (10–8 A-10)
- Head coach: Matt McKillop (4th season)
- Assistant coaches: Matt Matheny; Will Reigel; Joshua Heyliger
- Home arena: John M. Belk Arena

2025–26 Atlantic 10 men's basketball standings
	Conf.				Overall
Team	W		L	PCT	W		L	PCT
Saint Louis	15	–	3	.833	29	–	6	.829
VCU †	15	–	3	.833	28	–	8	.778
Saint Joseph's	13	–	5	.722	24	–	12	.667
Dayton	12	–	6	.667	25	–	12	.676
George Mason	11	–	7	.611	23	–	10	.697
Davidson	10	–	8	.556	20	–	14	.588
Duquesne	9	–	9	.500	18	–	15	.545
Fordham	8	–	10	.444	17	–	15	.531
George Washington	8	–	10	.444	19	–	16	.543
Rhode Island	7	–	11	.389	16	–	16	.500
Richmond	5	–	13	.278	15	–	17	.469
La Salle	5	–	13	.278	9	–	23	.281
St. Bonaventure	4	–	14	.222	17	–	17	.500
Loyola Chicago	4	–	14	.222	9	–	24	.273
† 2026 A-10 tournament winner

The 2025–26 Davidson Wildcats men's basketball team represented Davidson College during the 2025–26 NCAA Division I men's basketball season. The Wildcats were led by fourth-year head coach Matt McKillop, and played their home games at the John M. Belk Arena located in Davidson, North Carolina as members of the Atlantic 10 Conference (A-10).

== Previous season ==
The Wildcats finished the 2024–25 season 17–16, 6–12 in A-10 play, to finish in twelfth place. As a 12 seed, they defeated Richmond in the first round of the A-10 tournament, before losing to Saint Louis in the second round.

== Preseason ==
On September 30, 2025, the Atlantic 10 Conference released their preseason poll. Davidson was picked to finish eleventh in the conference.

=== Preseason rankings ===
Atlantic 10 Preseason Poll
Place	Team	Votes
1	VCU	342 (11)
2	Saint Louis	341 (11)
3	Dayton	321 (3)
4	George Washington	296
5	Loyola Chicago	286 (2)
6	George Mason	254
7	Saint Joseph's	195
8	St. Bonaventure	185
9	Duquesne	155
10	Richmond	142
11	Davidson	107
12	Rhode Island	102
13	La Salle	56
14	Fordham	53
(#) first-place votes

=== Preseason All-Atlantic 10 Teams ===
No players were named to the Preseason All-Atlantic 10 First, Second, or Third Teams.

== Roster ==
2025–26 Davidson Wildcats men's basketball team
Players
Coaches

Pos.	#	Name	Height	Weight	Year	Previous school	Hometown
F	0	Manie Joses	6 ft 7 in (2.01 m)	190 lb (86 kg)	So	NBA Global Academy	London, England
G	3	Nick Coval	6 ft 2 in (1.88 m)	180 lb (82 kg)	RS Fr	Parkland High School	Orefield, Pennsylvania
G	4	Josh Scovens	6 ft 6 in (1.98 m)	230 lb (104 kg)	Jr	Army	Greensboro, North Carolina
G	5	Parker Friedrichsen	6 ft 4 in (1.93 m)	185 lb (84 kg)	Jr	Wake Forest	Bixby, Oklahoma
G	6	Devin Brown	6 ft 6 in (1.98 m)	210 lb (95 kg)	Fr	Olentangy Orange High School	Lewis Center, Ohio
G	7	RJ Greer	6 ft 3 in (1.91 m)	175 lb (79 kg)	Fr	Archbishop Alter High School	Centerville, Ohio
F/C	8	Joe Hurlburt	6 ft 11 in (2.11 m)	240 lb (109 kg)	Sr	Colorado	Enderlin, North Dakota
G	11	Sam Brown	6 ft 3 in (1.91 m)	185 lb (84 kg)	Jr	Penn	Merion Station, Pennsylvania
G	12	Hunter Adam	6 ft 7 in (2.01 m)	225 lb (102 kg)	RS Jr	Christs College of Canterbury	Christchurch, New Zealand
G	14	Phillip Kavu (W)	6 ft 2 in (1.88 m)	170 lb (77 kg)	RS Fr	Lake Forest Academy	Manchester, England
F	15	Sean Logan	6 ft 10 in (2.08 m)	240 lb (109 kg)	Sr	Westfield High School	Westfield, New Jersey
F/C	16	Ian Platteeuw	7 ft 0 in (2.13 m)	232 lb (105 kg)	Fr	Joventut Badalona	Barcelona, Spain
F	24	JaQualon "JQ" Roberts	6 ft 8 in (2.03 m)	235 lb (107 kg)	Jr	Vanderbilt	Bloomington, Indiana
G	45	Roberts Blūms	6 ft 4 in (1.93 m)	190 lb (86 kg)	So	BK VEF Rīga	Riga, Latvia
F	50	John Nowland (W)	6 ft 8 in (2.03 m)	220 lb (100 kg)	Jr	Saint George's School	Spokane, Washington
G	51	Brock Matheny (W)	5 ft 10 in (1.78 m)	150 lb (68 kg)	Sr	Burlington Christian Academy	Davidson, North Carolina

Head coach

- Matt McKillop (Davidson)

Assistant coach(es)

- Will Reigel (Davidson)
- Matt Matheny (Davidson)
- Joshua Heyliger (Stonehill)
- Matt Williams (Davidson)
- Nick Schmidt (Alfred State)

Legend

- (C) Team captain
- (S) Suspended
- (I) Ineligible
- (W) Walk-on
- Injured
- Current redshirt

Roster
Last update: December 7, 2025

== Schedule and results ==
Date time, TV	Rank^{#}	Opponent^{#}	Result	Record	High points	High rebounds	High assists	Site (attendance) city, state
Regular season
November 3, 2025*; 7:00 p.m., ESPN+		DeSales	W 97–63	1–0	18 – Adam	6 – Joses	4 – S. Brown	Belk Arena (2,218); Davidson, NC
November 7, 2025*; 7:00 p.m., ESPN+		Washington State	W 85–69	2–0	14 – Adam	5 – Friedrichsen	4 – Tied	Belk Arena (2,646); Davidson, NC
November 11, 2025*; 7:00 p.m., ESPN+		at Charlotte	W 62–55	3–0	16 – Adams	5 – Logan	3 – Coval	Halton Arena (3,712); Charlotte, NC
November 15, 2025*; 6:00 p.m., ESPN+		Bowling Green	W 91–87	4–0	18 – S. Brown	8 – Platteeuw	6 – Platteeuw	Belk Arena (2,536); Davidson, NC
November 21, 2025*; 3:30 p.m., ESPN2		vs. Boston College; Charleston Classic Lowcountry semifinals	W 59–49	5–0	12 – Scovens	5 – Adam	2 – S. Brown	TD Arena (2,112); Charleston, SC
November 23, 2025*; 9:00 p.m., ESPN2		vs. Utah State; Charleston Classic Lowcountry Championship	L 60–94	5–1	14 – Tied	6 – Roberts	3 – Tied	TD Arena (1,817); Charleston, SC
November 28, 2025*; 4:00 p.m., ESPN+		North Carolina A&T	W 90–74	6–1	21 – Scovens	8 – Scovens	6 – Platteeuw	Belk Arena (2,795); Davidson, NC
December 4, 2025*; 7:00 p.m., ESPN+		The Citadel	W 79–63	7–1	16 – Tied	7 – Platteeuw	5 – S. Brown	Belk Arena (1,990); Davidson, NC
December 7, 2025*; 2:00 p.m., ESPN+		Saint Mary's (CA)	L 61–70	7–2	16 – S. Brown	6 – Roberts	3 – Friedrichsen	Belk Arena (2,692); Davidson, NC
December 13, 2025*; 2:00 p.m., ESPN+		Mercyhurst	W 80–47	8–2	15 – Scovens	8 – Scovens	7 – Friedrichsen	Belk Arena (2,130); Davidson, NC
December 18, 2025*; 7:00 p.m., ESPN+/FDSN		Temple	L 63–68	8–3	14 – Blums	6 – Platteeuw	3 – Friedrichsen	Belk Arena (2,151); Davidson, NC
December 22, 2025*; 7:00 p.m., ESPN+/B12N		at No. 17 Kansas	L 61–90	8–4	13 – Blums	7 – Blums	5 – Platteeuw	Allen Fieldhouse (15,300); Lawrence, KS
December 30, 2025; 7:00 p.m., ESPN+/FDSN		Duquesne	L 83–89 ^{2OT}	8–5 (0–1)	23 – S. Brown	6 – Friedrichsen	4 – S. Brown	Belk Arena (4,505); Davidson, NC
January 3, 2026; 6:00 p.m., CBSSN		at Saint Joseph's	W 62–56	9–5 (1–1)	13 – S. Brown	5 – Platteeuw	2 – Tied	Hagan Arena (2,051); Philadelphia, PA
January 7, 2026; 8:00 p.m., CBSSN		at Loyola Chicago	W 79–64	10–5 (2–1)	27 – Friedrichsen	5 – Tied	7 – S. Brown	Joseph J. Gentile Arena (1,619); Chicago, IL
January 10, 2026; 2:00 p.m., USA Network		Rhode Island	L 45–70	10–6 (2–2)	10 – Scovens	6 – Roberts	2 – Tied	Belk Arena (3,188); Davidson, NC
January 14, 2026; 7:00 p.m., ESPN+		at George Washington	W 84–79	11–6 (3–2)	21 – Blums	8 – Scovens	6 – Friedrichsen	Charles E. Smith Center (1,961); Washington, D.C.
January 21, 2026; 7:00 p.m., ESPN+/FDSN		Fordham	W 68–63	12–6 (4–2)	19 – Scovens	5 – Roberts	1 – Tied	Belk Arena (2,546); Davidson, NC
January 24, 2026; 5:00 p.m., USA Network		VCU	L 69–75	12–7 (4–3)	18 – S. Brown	6 – D. Brown	2 – Tied	Belk Arena (3,538); Davidson, NC
January 28, 2026; 7:00 p.m., CBSSN		at George Mason	L 52–60	12–8 (4–4)	16 – Blums	9 – Scovens	3 – Coval	EagleBank Arena (3,604); Fairfax, VA
January 31, 2026; 4:30 p.m., USA		at Richmond	W 79–54	13–8 (5–4)	23 – Blums	6 – Blums	4 – Platteeuw	Robins Center (6,123); Richmond, VA
February 3, 2026; 9:00 p.m., CBSSN		No. 19 Saint Louis	L 82–91	13–9 (5–5)	17 – Scovens	10 – Scovens	4 – S. Brown	Belk Arena (2,523); Davidson, NC
February 6, 2026; 6:00 p.m., CBSSN		Loyola Chicago	W 84–64	14−9 (6−5)	16 – Blums	6 – Platteeuw	3 – Tied	Belk Arena (3,520); Davidson, NC
February 9, 2026; 7:00 p.m., ESPN+		Mid-Atlantic Christian	W 114–53	15–9	14 – Tied	12 – Platteeuw	5 – D. Brown	Belk Arena (1,690); Davidson, NC
February 15, 2026; 4:00 p.m., ESPN2		at Dayton	L 59–70	15−10 (6−6)	21 – Friedrichsen	3 – Tied	3 – Tied	UD Arena (13,407); Dayton, OH
February 18, 2026; 7:00 p.m., ESPN+/FDSN		Richmond	W 65–63	16–10 (7–6)	18 – Blums	13 – Blums	4 – Scovens	Belk Arena (2,597); Davidson, NC
February 21, 2026; 2:00 p.m., ESPN+		at Fordham	L 59–63	16–11 (7–7)	16 – Blums	6 – Blums	4 – Scovens	Rose Hill Gymnasium (2,102); The Bronx, NY
February 25, 2026; 7:00 p.m., ESPN+		at Duquesne	W 67–56	17–11 (8–7)	16 – Friedrichsen	10 – Blums	3 – Tied	UPMC Cooper Fieldhouse (2,166); Pittsburgh, PA
March 1, 2026; 12:00 p.m., USA Network		La Salle	W 71–64	18–11 (9–7)	17 – Blums	6 – Tied	3 – Tied	Belk Arena (3,891); Davidson, NC
March 4, 2026; 7:00 p.m., ESPN+/FDSN		Saint Joseph's	L 67–70	18–12 (9–8)	20 – S. Brown	7 – D. Brown	3 – Tied	Belk Arena (2,775); Davidson, NC
March 7, 2026; 12:00 p.m., USA Network		at St. Bonaventure	W 68–63	19–12 (10–8)	15 – S. Brown	7 – Adam	6 – Coval	Reilly Center (3,785); St. Bonaventure, NY
Atlantic 10 tournament
March 12, 2026; 7:30 p.m., USA Network	(6)	vs. (14) Loyola Chicago; Second round	W 64–59 ^{OT}	20–12	14 – Blums	8 – D. Brown	5 – Scovens	PPG Paints Arena (7,526); Pittsburgh, PA
March 13, 2026; 7:30 p.m., CNBC	(6)	vs. (3) Saint Joseph's; Quarterfinals	L 58–70	20–13	15 – Scovens	9 – Scovens	3 – S. Brown	PPG Paints Arena (8,114); Pittsburgh, PA
NIT
March 17, 2026; 7:00 p.m., ESPN2		at (2 T) Oklahoma State; First round	L 80–84	20–14	22 – Blums	6 – Scovens	5 – Scovens	Gallagher-Iba Arena (1,581); Stillwater, OK
*Non-conference game. ^{#}Rankings from AP poll. (#) Tournament seedings in parentheses. T=Tulsa. All times are in Eastern Time.
