= 2025–26 George Mason Patriots men's basketball team =

American college basketball season

2025–26 George Mason Patriots men's basketball

Sunshine Slam Beach Bracket champions

NIT, First round
- Conference: Atlantic 10 Conference
- Record: 23–10 (11–7 A–10)
- Head coach: Tony Skinn (3rd season)
- Associate head coach: Steve Curran
- Assistant coaches: Louis Hinnant; Andy Fox; Mark Bialkoski
- Home arena: EagleBank Arena

2025–26 Atlantic 10 men's basketball standings
	Conf.				Overall
Team	W		L	PCT	W		L	PCT
Saint Louis	15	–	3	.833	28	–	5	.848
VCU †	15	–	3	.833	27	–	7	.794
Saint Joseph's	13	–	5	.722	22	–	11	.667
Dayton	12	–	6	.667	23	–	11	.676
George Mason	11	–	7	.611	23	–	9	.719
Davidson	10	–	8	.556	20	–	13	.606
Duquesne	9	–	9	.500	18	–	15	.545
Fordham	8	–	10	.444	17	–	15	.531
George Washington	8	–	10	.444	18	–	15	.545
Rhode Island	7	–	11	.389	16	–	16	.500
Richmond	5	–	13	.278	15	–	17	.469
La Salle	5	–	13	.278	9	–	23	.281
St. Bonaventure	4	–	14	.222	17	–	17	.500
Loyola Chicago	4	–	14	.222	9	–	24	.273
† 2026 A-10 tournament winner As of March 15, 2026; Rankings from AP Poll

The 2025–26 George Mason Patriots Men's basketball team represented George Mason University during the 2025–26 NCAA Division I men's basketball season. The season marked the 60th for the program, the third under head coach Tony Skinn, and the thirteenth as members of the Atlantic 10 Conference (A-10). The Patriots played their home games at EagleBank Arena in Fairfax, Virginia.

== Previous season ==
The Patriots finished the previous season 27–9, 15–3 in A-10 play, to finish tied for first place. They lost to VCU in the finals of the A-10 tournament. Their season ended with a second round loss in the 2025 National Invitation Tournament.

== Offseason ==
=== Departures ===
Name	Pos.	Year	Notes
Zach Anderson	F	Senior	Graduated
Austin Ball	F	Sophomore	Transferred to Eastern Kentucky
Justin Begg	G	Freshman	Transferred to Sam Houston
Jared Billups	G	Senior	Graduated
Bryson Cokley	G	Freshman	Transferred to Elon
Giovanni Emejuru	F	Junior	Transferred to East Carolina
Jalen Haynes	F	Junior	Transferred to Cincinnati
K. D. Johnson	G	Senior	Graduated
Darius Maddox	G	Senior	Graduated
Woody Newton	F	Senior	Graduated
Jeremiah Quigley	G	Sophomore	Transferred to Binghamton

=== Arrivals ===
Name	Pos.	Year	Notes
Dola Adebayo	F	Junior	Transferred from Mount St. Mary's
Riley Allenspach	C	Sophomore	Transferred from Samford
Nick Ellington	C	Junior	Transferred from Murray State
Fatt Hill	G	Junior	Transferred from Ball State
Jahari Long	G	Junior	Transferred from Maryland
Kory Mincy	G	Sophomore	Transferred from Presbyterian
Malik Presley	F	Sophomore	Transferred from Texas
Masai Troutman	G	Junior	Transferred from Northeastern

== Honors and awards ==
All Atlantic 10 Second Team

- Riley Allenspach
- Kory Mincy

== Roster ==
2025–26 George Mason Patriots men's basketball team
Players
Coaches

Pos.	#	Name	Height	Weight	Year	Previous school	Hometown
G	0	Masai Troutman	6 ft 5 in (1.96 m)	200 lb (91 kg)	Sr	Northeastern	Frederick, MD
G	1	Brayden O’Connor	6 ft 5 in (1.96 m)	212 lb (96 kg)	Sr	UMass Lowell	Ottawa, Ontario
G	2	Jahari Long	6 ft 5 in (1.96 m)	210 lb (95 kg)	GS	Maryland	Houston, TX
G	3	Kory Mincy	6 ft 2 in (1.88 m)	180 lb (82 kg)	Jr	Presbyterian	East Point, GA
F	4	Dola Adebayo	6 ft 8 in (2.03 m)	220 lb (100 kg)	GS	Mount St. Mary's	Fort Myers, FL
G	5	Fatt Hill	6 ft 5 in (1.96 m)	185 lb (84 kg)	Sr	Ball State	Bessemer, AL
G	7	Isaiah Skinn	6 ft 0 in (1.83 m)	165 lb (75 kg)	Fr	Edison High School	Alexandria, VA
F	9	Stas Sivka	6 ft 10 in (2.08 m)	220 lb (100 kg)	So	BC Rogaska	Celje, Slovenia
F	10	Emmanuel Kanga	6 ft 8 in (2.03 m)	220 lb (100 kg)	Fr	Mt. Zion Prep	Libreville, Gabon
G	11	Devin Booker	6 ft 4 in (1.93 m)	180 lb (82 kg)	Fr	Cristo Rey Jesuit	Philadelphia, PA
G	12	Ben Woodward	6 ft 4 in (1.93 m)	195 lb (88 kg)	Jr	John Champe HS	Ashburn, VA
G/F	13	Malik Presley	6 ft 6 in (1.98 m)	200 lb (91 kg)	Jr	San Marcos HS	San Marcos, TX
G	14	T.J. Prosise	6 ft 3 in (1.91 m)	175 lb (79 kg)	Fr	Life Christian Academy	Chesterfield, VA
F	23	Nick Ellington	6 ft 8 in (2.03 m)	215 lb (98 kg)	GS	Murray State	St. Louis, MO
F	31	Ryan-Preson Mendy	6 ft 9 in (2.06 m)	205 lb (93 kg)	Fr	Joliot Curie Comprehensive School	Nanterre, France
F/C	35	Riley Allenspach	6 ft 11 in (2.11 m)	250 lb (113 kg)	Jr	Samford	Charlotte, NC

Head coach

- Tony Skinn (George Mason)

Assistant coach(es)

- Steve Curran (Merrimack)
- Louis Hinnant (Boston College)
- Andy Fox (Cornell (Iowa))
- Mark Bialkoski (Georgia Southern)

Legend

- (C) Team captain
- (S) Suspended
- (I) Ineligible
- (W) Walk-on
- Injured
- Current redshirt

Roster
Last update: October 20, 2025

== Player statistics ==
Player	GP	GS	MPG	FG%	3FG%	FT%	RPG	APG	SPG	BPG	PPG
Kory Mincy	16	15	35.2	.478	.420	.930	3.7	3.5	1.2	0.1	17.1
Riley Allenspach	16	16	23.6	.578	.273	.649	5.9	0.9	0.4	0.2	12.6
Jahari Long	16	16	32.3	.469	.458	.806	3.4	3.7	0.4	0.2	11.1
Fatt Hill	10	0	20.8	.525	.250	.696	3.7	1.4	1.0	0.2	10.5
Masai Troutman	14	5	20.8	.391	.333	.825	4.1	1.6	0.6	0.3	9.9
Malik Presley	16	15	23.6	.537	.375	.462	2.3	1.3	0.8	0.4	5.6
Emmanuel Kanga	15	0	11.5	.639	.000	.522	4.9	0.3	0.2	0.8	4.7
Nick Ellington	16	0	12.4	.500	.000	.652	2.8	0.3	0.3	0.8	4.6
Dola Adebayo	13	12	14.5	.365	.294	.800	3.2	0.7	0.9	0.5	4.5
Brayden O'Connor	1	1	15.0	.250	.000	.000	3.0	1.0	1.0	0.0	4.0
Stas Sivka	14	0	9.4	.423	.400	.900	1.4	0.4	0.2	0.2	2.6
Devin Booker	11	0	6.8	.364	.167	.444	0.7	0.1	0.0	0.1	2.0
T.J. Prosise	4	0	1.8	.000	.000	.000	0.0	0.3	0.3	0.0	0.0
Ben Woodward	4	0	1.8	.000	.000	.000	0.0	0.0	0.0	0.0	0.0

== Schedule and results ==
Date time, TV	Rank^{#}	Opponent^{#}	Result	Record	High points	High rebounds	High assists	Site (attendance) city, state
Exhibition
October 25, 2025*; 2:00 p.m.		Alfred	W 74–41	–	13 – O'Connor	7 – Mincy	4 – Tied	EagleBank Arena (1,630); Fairfax, VA
Non-conference regular season
November 3, 2025*; 7:00 p.m., ESPN+		Wofford	W 70–46	1–0	18 – Mincy	6 – Troutman	6 – Mincy	EagleBank Arena (3,009); Fairfax, VA
November 7, 2025*; 7:00 p.m., ESPN+		Winthrop	W 96–90	2–0	29 – Mincy	8 – Long	4 – Long	EagleBank Arena (2,933); Fairfax, VA
November 11, 2025*; 7:00 p.m., ESPN+		Catawba	W 86–62	3–0	25 – Long	5 – Tied	3 – Tied	EagleBank Arena (2,481); Fairfax, VA
November 15, 2025*; 2:00 p.m., ESPN+		New Hampshire	W 61–44	4–0	14 – Adebayo	11 – Allenspach	3 – Troutman	EagleBank Arena (2,505); Fairfax, VA
November 18, 2025*; 7:00 p.m., ESPN+		Jacksonville; Sunshine Slam campus game	W 79–57	5–0	20 – Troutman	5 – Tied	5 – Long	EagleBank Arena (2,578); Fairfax, VA
November 24, 2025*; 6:00 p.m., CBSSN		vs. Ohio; Sunshine Slam Beach Bracket semifinals	W 92–69	6–0	22 – Mincy	9 – Hill	8 – Long	Ocean Center; Daytona Beach, FL
November 25, 2025*; 7:30 p.m., CBSSN		vs. Florida Atlantic; Sunshine Slam Beach Bracket championship game	W 74–65	7–0	22 – Mincy	9 – Allenspach	5 – Mincy	Ocean Center (1,078); Daytona Beach, FL
November 29, 2025*; 2:00 p.m., ESPN+		James Madison	W 82–66	8–0	25 – Mincy	9 – Allenspach	5 – Long	EagleBank Arena (5,262); Fairfax, VA
December 2, 2025*; 7:00 p.m., ESPN+		Cornell	W 99–81	9–0	17 – Presley	7 – Tied	4 – Tied	EagleBank Arena (3,633); Fairfax, VA
December 6, 2025*; 3:00 p.m., ACCNX		at Virginia Tech	L 62–73	9–1	16 – Mincy	9 – Kanga	8 – Mincy	Cassell Coliseum (6,463); Blacksburg, VA
December 13, 2025*; 12:30 p.m., USA		Old Dominion	W 73–61	10–1	26 – Allenspach	6 – Tied	4 – Long	EagleBank Arena (4,433); Fairfax, VA
December 21, 2025*; 2:00 p.m., ESPN+		Loyola (MD)	W 86–79	11–1	26 – Mincy	6 – Tied	5 – Long	EagleBank Arena (2,721); Fairfax, VA
December 28, 2025*; 5:00 p.m., ESPN+		Penn	W 83–79	12–1	18 – Hill	11 – Ellington	5 – Long	EagleBank Arena (3,860); Fairfax, VA
Atlantic 10 regular season
December 31, 2025; 2:00 p.m., ESPN+		at La Salle	W 80–75	13–1 (1–0)	21 – Mincy	8 – Kanga	4 – Mincy	John Glaser Arena (1,032); Philadelphia, PA
January 3, 2026; 4:00 p.m., USA		Rhode Island	W 61–50	14–1 (2–0)	17 – Sivka	6 – Tied	4 – Mincy	EagleBank Arena (4,086); Fairfax, VA
January 7, 2026; 7:00 p.m., ESPN+		at Fordham	W 67–58	15–1 (3–0)	18 – Allenspach	8 – Troutman	7 – Long	Rose Hill Gymnasium (577); Bronx, NY
January 10, 2026; 12:00 p.m., ESPNU		VCU; Rivalry	W 86–80	16–1 (4–0)	16 – Hill	6 – Kanga	5 – Tied	EagleBank Arena (6,370); Fairfax, VA
January 13, 2026; 7:00 p.m., CBSSN		at Loyola Chicago	W 82–74	17–1 (5–0)	23 – Allenspach	5 – Tied	5 – Hill	Gentile Arena (2,405); Chicago, IL
January 19, 2026; 5:00 p.m., CBSSN		George Washington; Revolutionary Rivalry	W 69–64	18–1 (6–0)	18 – Allenspach	12 – Allenspach	5 – Long	EagleBank Arena (6,434); Fairfax, VA
January 24, 2026; 2:00 p.m., ESPN+		at Rhode Island	L 65–74	18–2 (6–1)	19 – Mincy	6 – Mincy	2 – Tied	Ryan Center (4,487); Kingston, RI
January 28, 2026; 7:00 p.m., CBSSN		Davidson	W 60–52	19–2 (7–1)	19 – Mincy	7 – Ellington	5 – Mincy	EagleBank Arena (3,604); Fairfax, VA
January 31, 2026; 6:30 p.m., USA		at St. Bonaventure	W 77–73	20–2 (8–1)	22 – Mincy	8 – Allenspach	9 – Long	Reilly Center (4,338); St. Bonaventure, NY
February 4, 2026; 7:00 p.m., ESPN+		Duquesne	L 65–71	20–3 (8–2)	18 – Allenspach	7 – Allenspach	3 – Tied	EagleBank Arena (3,108); Fairfax, VA
February 7, 2026; 4:00 p.m., ESPN+		Saint Joseph's; Homecoming	W 60–52	21–3 (9–2)	20 – Long	7 – Allenspach	3 – Tied	EagleBank Arena (7,335); Fairfax, VA
February 10, 2026; 7:00 p.m., ESPN+		at Richmond	L 70–82	21–4 (9–3)	23 – Hill	8 – Tied	4 – Long	Robins Center (4,282); Richmond, VA
February 13, 2026; 7:00 p.m., CBSSN		at George Washington; Revolutionary Rivalry	L 53–72	21–5 (9–4)	15 – Troutman	5 – Troutman	5 – Hill	Charles E. Smith Center (3,694); Washington, D.C.
February 18, 2026; 7:00 p.m., CBSSN		Dayton	L 67–82	21–6 (9–5)	17 – Long	5 – Tied	3 – Mincy	EagleBank Arena (4,042); Fairfax, VA
February 25, 2026; 7:00 p.m., ESPN+		at Saint Joseph's	L 63–81	21–7 (9–6)	23 – Allenspach	5 – Tied	4 – Long	Hagan Arena (2,221); Philadelphia, PA
February 28, 2026; 2:00 p.m., ESPN+		St. Bonaventure	W 71–58	22–7 (10–6)	21 – Tied	6 – Tied	6 – Long	EagleBank Arena (4,770); Fairfax, VA
March 3, 2026; 7:00 p.m., CBSSN		at VCU	L 65–70	22–8 (10–7)	18 – Mincy	10 – Allenspach	5 – Long	Siegel Center (7,637); Richmond, VA
March 7, 2026; 4:00 p.m., USA		No. 25 Saint Louis	W 86–57	23–8 (11–7)	21 – Long	11 – Kanga	9 – Long	EagleBank Arena (6,461); Fairfax, VA
A-10 tournament
March 12, 2025; 2:00 p.m., USA	(5)	vs. (13) St. Bonaventure; Second round	L 57–63	23–9	17 – Long	10 – Allenspach	2 – Tied	PPG Paints Arena (5,983); Pittsburgh, PA
NIT
March 17, 2026; 6:00 pm, ESPN2	(3 AU)	Liberty; First round	L 71–77	23–10	27 – Long	10 – Kanga	4 – Long	EagleBank Arena (1,485); Fairfax, VA
*Non-conference game. ^{#}Rankings from AP poll. (#) Tournament seedings in parentheses. AU=Auburn. All times are in Eastern Time.
