= 2025–26 Rhode Island Rams men's basketball team =

American college basketball season

2025–26 Rhode Island Rams men's basketball
- Conference: Atlantic 10 Conference
- Record: 16–16 (7–11 A-10)
- Head coach: Archie Miller (4th season)
- Assistant coaches: James Whitford; Duane Woodward; Austin Carroll; Benny Sander; Chandler Graves
- Home arena: Ryan Center

2025–26 Atlantic 10 men's basketball standings
	Conf.				Overall
Team	W		L	PCT	W		L	PCT
Saint Louis	15	–	3	.833	28	–	5	.848
VCU †	15	–	3	.833	27	–	7	.794
Saint Joseph's	13	–	5	.722	22	–	11	.667
Dayton	12	–	6	.667	23	–	11	.676
George Mason	11	–	7	.611	23	–	9	.719
Davidson	10	–	8	.556	20	–	13	.606
Duquesne	9	–	9	.500	18	–	15	.545
Fordham	8	–	10	.444	17	–	15	.531
George Washington	8	–	10	.444	18	–	15	.545
Rhode Island	7	–	11	.389	16	–	16	.500
Richmond	5	–	13	.278	15	–	17	.469
La Salle	5	–	13	.278	9	–	23	.281
St. Bonaventure	4	–	14	.222	17	–	17	.500
Loyola Chicago	4	–	14	.222	9	–	24	.273
† 2026 A-10 tournament winner As of March 15, 2026; Rankings from AP Poll

The 2025–26 Rhode Island Rams men's basketball team represented the University of Rhode Island during the 2025–26 NCAA Division I men's basketball season. The Rams, led by fourth-year head coach Archie Miller, played their home games at the Ryan Center in Kingston, Rhode Island as members of the Atlantic 10 Conference.

== Previous season ==
The Rams finished the 2024–25 season 18–13, 7–11 in A-10 play, to finish in a tie for tenth place. They were upset by #15 seed Fordham in the first round of the A-10 tournament.

== Preseason ==
On September 30, 2025, the Atlantic 10 Conference released their preseason poll. Rhode Island was picked to finish 12th in the conference.

=== Preseason rankings ===
Atlantic 10 Preseason Poll
Place	Team	Votes
1	VCU	342 (11)
2	Saint Louis	341 (11)
3	Dayton	321 (3)
4	George Washington	296
5	Loyola Chicago	286 (2)
6	George Mason	254
7	Saint Joseph's	195
8	St. Bonaventure	185
9	Duquesne	155
10	Richmond	142
11	Davidson	107
12	Rhode Island	102
13	La Salle	56
14	Fordham	53
(#) first-place votes

=== Preseason All-Atlantic 10 Teams ===
No players were named to the Preseason All-Atlantic 10 First, Second, or Third Teams.

== Roster ==
2025–26 Rhode Island Rams men's basketball team
Players
Coaches

Pos.	#	Name	Height	Weight	Year	Previous school	Hometown
G/F	0	Jahmere Tripp	6 ft 6 in (1.98 m)	234 lb (106 kg)	Jr	Fordham	Brooklyn, New York
G	5	Jonah Hinton	6 ft 3 in (1.91 m)	185 lb (84 kg)	RS Jr	St. Bonaventure	Chicago, Illinois
G	7	Jalen Harper	6 ft 3 in (1.91 m)	190 lb (86 kg)	Fr	St. Joe's Prep	Philadelphia, Pennsylvania
F	8	Alex Crawford	6 ft 8 in (2.03 m)	215 lb (98 kg)	RS Sr	Fresno State	Chula Vista, California
G	10	Barrett Loer	6 ft 6 in (1.98 m)	190 lb (86 kg)	Fr	St. George's School	Millis, Massachusetts
F	11	Javon Perry	6 ft 8 in (2.03 m)	207 lb (94 kg)	Fr	MacDuffie School	Springfield, Massachusetts
G	13	Jaymien Aponte (W)	6 ft 3 in (1.91 m)	183 lb (83 kg)	So	Cranston High School West	Cranston, Rhode Island
C	17	Moek Icke (W)	7 ft 1 in (2.16 m)	223 lb (101 kg)	RS Fr	Porsche BBA Ludwigsburg	Purmerend, Netherlands
G	20	Myles Corey	6 ft 1 in (1.85 m)	180 lb (82 kg)	GS	South Alabama	Ontario, California
G	21	Damone King	6 ft 2 in (1.88 m)	180 lb (82 kg)	RS Fr	DeSales High School	Louisville, Kentucky
G	22	RJ Johnson	6 ft 1 in (1.85 m)	177 lb (80 kg)	GS	Charleston Southern	Matthews, North Carolina
G	23	Tyler Cochran	6 ft 4 in (1.93 m)	222 lb (101 kg)	GS	Minnesota	Bolingbrook, Illinois
G	30	Jimmy Ball (W)	6 ft 2 in (1.88 m)	183 lb (83 kg)	Sr	Arlington Catholic High School	Medford, Massachusetts
F	35	Mouhamed Sow	6 ft 9 in (2.06 m)	217 lb (98 kg)	RS Sr	Saint Peter's	Dakar, Senegal
F	40	Keeyan Itejere	6 ft 9 in (2.06 m)	220 lb (100 kg)	GS	Northern Kentucky	Knightdale, North Carolina
F	55	Drissa Traore	6 ft 8 in (2.03 m)	220 lb (100 kg)	RS Sr	St. John's	New York, New York

Head coach

- Archie Miller (NC State)

Assistant coach(es)

- James Whitford (Wisconsin)
- Duane Woodward (Boston College)
- Austin Carroll (American)
- Benny Sander (Arizona)
- Chandler Graves (Indiana)

Legend

- (C) Team captain
- (S) Suspended
- (I) Ineligible
- (W) Walk-on
- Injured
- Current redshirt

Roster
Last update: December 7, 2025

== Schedule and results ==
Date time, TV	Rank^{#}	Opponent^{#}	Result	Record	High points	High rebounds	High assists	Site (attendance) city, state
Non-conference regular season
November 3, 2025*; 7:00 pm, ESPN+		Stetson	W 93–62	1–0	17 – Cochran	9 – Cochran	6 – Johnson	Ryan Center (3,269); Kingston, RI
November 7, 2025*; 6:00 pm, CBSSN		vs. Tulsa; Veterans Classic	L 65–82	1–1	19 – Hinton	8 – Sow	4 – Tied	Alumni Hall; Annapolis, MD
November 11, 2025*; 7:00 pm, ESPN+		Stonehill	W 80–57	2–1	16 – Tied	7 – Cochran	2 – Tied	Ryan Center (3,451); Kingston, RI
November 14, 2025*; 7:00 pm, ESPN+		Albany	W 80−61	3−1	19 – Corey	7 – Crawford	3 – Tied	Ryan Center (3,331); Kingston, RI
November 18, 2025*; 8:00 pm, ESPN+		at Yale	W 86−77	4−1	24 – Hinton	6 – Sow	4 – Tripp	John J. Lee Amphitheater (942); New Haven, CT
November 24, 2025*; 11:00 am, ESPN2		vs. Towson; ESPN Events Invitational Adventure Bracket quarterfinals	L 55–62	4–2	14 – Corey	9 – Itejere	3 – Johnson	State Farm Field House; Bay Lake, FL
November 25, 2025*; 2:30 pm, ESPNU		vs. Vermont; ESPN Events Invitational Adventure Bracket consolation semifinals	W 80–65	5–2	22 – Corey	7 – Tied	3 – Hinton	State Farm Field House (957); Bay Lake, FL
November 26, 2025*; 7:30 pm, ESPNU		vs. Temple; ESPN Events Invitational Adventure Bracket 5th place game	W 90–75	6–2	25 – Hinton	9 – Cochran	5 – Johnson	State Farm Field House (539); Bay Lake, FL
December 2, 2025*; 7:00 pm, ESPN+		Brown	W 66–56	7–2	17 – Tied	10 – Cochran	3 – Tied	Ryan Center (3,575); Kingston, RI
December 6, 2025*; 12:00 pm, truTV		at Providence; Ocean State Rivalry	L 71–90	7–3	23 – Hinton	5 – Corey	4 – Tied	Amica Mutual Pavilion (11,924); Providence, RI
December 9, 2025*; 7:00 pm, ESPN+		McNeese	L 64–66	7–4	16 – Tripp	10 – Itejere	2 – Tied	Ryan Center (3,419); Kingston, RI
December 16, 2025*; 7:00 pm, ESPN+		Canisius	W 62–45	8–4	20 – Hinton	11 – Itejere	4 – Cochran	Ryan Center (2,895); Kingston, RI
December 22, 2025*; 7:00 pm, ESPN+		Northeastern	W 85–77	9–4	19 – Johnson	9 – Crawford	6 – Johnson	Ryan Center (3,585); Kingston, RI
A-10 regular season
December 31, 2025; 12:00 pm, ESPN+		Loyola Chicago	L 57–61	9–5 (0–1)	15 – Tied	5 – Tied	2 – Tied	Ryan Center (3,712); Kingston, RI
January 3, 2026; 4:00 pm, USA		at George Mason	L 50–61	9–6 (0–2)	12 – Corey	7 – Cochran	2 – Tied	EagleBank Arena (4,086); Fairfax, VA
January 7, 2026; 7:00 pm, ESPN+		La Salle	L 72–79	9–7 (0–3)	18 – Hinton	6 – Itejere	4 – Corey	Ryan Center (3,074); Kingston, RI
January 10, 2026; 2:00 pm, USA		at Davidson	W 70–45	10–7 (1–3)	18 – Itejere	8 – Crawford	7 – Johnson	John M. Belk Arena (3,188); Davidson, NC
January 14, 2026; 6:00 pm, CBSSN		VCU	L 75–84	10–8 (1–4)	17 – Cochran	9 – Cochran	4 – Hinton	Ryan Center (3,712); Kingston, RI
January 21, 2026; 7:00 pm, ESPN+		at Richmond	W 69–68	11–8 (2–4)	18 – Cochran	8 – Itejere	2 – Cochran	Robins Center (4,571); Richmond, VA
January 24, 2026; 2:00 pm, ESPN+		George Mason	W 74–65	12–8 (3–4)	23 – Tripp	7 – Tripp	5 – Corey	Ryan Center (4,487); Kingston, RI
January 27, 2026; 7:00 pm, ESPN+		at Dayton	W 81–76 ^{OT}	12–9 (4–4)	24 – Tripp	8 – Tripp	5 – Cochran	UD Arena (13,407); Dayton, OH
February 1, 2026; 12:00 pm, USA		at Duquesne	L 61–76	13–9 (4–5)	18 – Cochran	7 – Cochran	4 – Johnson	UPMC Cooper Fieldhouse (2,536); Pittsburgh, PA
February 7, 2026; 2:00 pm, ESPN+		Richmond	W 82–77	14–9 (5–5)	34 – Cochran	10 – Cochran	7 – Johnson	Ryan Center (4,430); Kingston, RI
February 10, 2026; 7:00 pm, ESPN+		at George Washington	L 70–75	14–10 (5–6)	24 – Cochran	12 – Itejere	7 – Johnson	Charles E. Smith Center (1,824); Washington, D.C.
February 14, 2026; 12:00 pm, ESPN+		Fordham	L 66–70	14–11 (5–7)	25 – Cochran	9 – Cochran	5 – Johnson	Ryan Center (3,546); Kingston, RI
February 17, 2026; 7:00 pm, ESPN+		No. 18 Saint Louis	W 81–76	15–11 (6–7)	29 – Hinton	9 – Itejere	8 – Johnson	Ryan Center (5,331); Kingston, RI
February 21, 2026; 2:30 pm, ESPN+		at La Salle	L 46–59	15–12 (6–8)	14 – Corey	9 – Itejere	5 – Johnson	John Glaser Arena (1,152); Philadelphia, PA
February 25, 2026; 7:00 pm, ESPN+		at St. Bonaventure	L 76–94	15–13 (6–9)	21 – Cochran	7 – Cochran	6 – Johnson	Reilly Center (2,708); St. Bonaventure, NY
February 28, 2026; 12:00 pm, ESPN+		Saint Joseph's	L 55–61	15–14 (6–10)	13 – Cochran	15 – Cochran	4 – Corey	Ryan Center (6,391); Kingston, RI
March 4, 2026; 7:00 pm, ESPN+		Duquesne	W 64–52	16–14 (7–10)	21 – Cochran	10 – Cochran	3 – Tied	Ryan Center (3,378); Kingston, RI
March 7, 2026; 2:00 pm, ESPN+		at Fordham	L 49–61	16–15 (7–11)	18 – Tripp	8 – Cochran	4 – Johnson	Rose Hill Gymnasium (2,186); Bronx, NY
A-10 tournament
March 12, 2026; 5:00 p.m., USA	(10)	vs. (7) Duquesne; Second round	L 61–67	16–16	34 – Cochran	10 – Cochran	5 – Johnson	PPG Paints Arena; Pittsburgh, PA
*Non-conference game. ^{#}Rankings from AP Poll. (#) Tournament seedings in parentheses. All times are in Eastern.
