= 2025–26 Richmond Spiders men's basketball team =

American college basketball season

2025–26 Richmond Spiders men's basketball
- Conference: Atlantic 10 Conference
- Record: 15–17 (5–13 A-10)
- Head coach: Chris Mooney (21st season)
- Associate head coach: Peter Thomas
- Assistant coaches: David Boyden; Will Gipe; Jack Fahed
- Home arena: Robins Center

2025–26 Atlantic 10 men's basketball standings
	Conf.				Overall
Team	W		L	PCT	W		L	PCT
Saint Louis	15	–	3	.833	29	–	6	.829
VCU †	15	–	3	.833	28	–	8	.778
Saint Joseph's	13	–	5	.722	24	–	12	.667
Dayton	12	–	6	.667	25	–	12	.676
George Mason	11	–	7	.611	23	–	10	.697
Davidson	10	–	8	.556	20	–	14	.588
Duquesne	9	–	9	.500	18	–	15	.545
Fordham	8	–	10	.444	17	–	15	.531
George Washington	8	–	10	.444	19	–	16	.543
Rhode Island	7	–	11	.389	16	–	16	.500
Richmond	5	–	13	.278	15	–	17	.469
La Salle	5	–	13	.278	9	–	23	.281
St. Bonaventure	4	–	14	.222	17	–	17	.500
Loyola Chicago	4	–	14	.222	9	–	24	.273
† 2026 A-10 tournament winner

The 2025–26 Richmond Spiders men's basketball team represented the University of Richmond during the 2025–26 NCAA Division I men's basketball season. The Spiders, led by 21st-year head coach Chris Mooney, played their home games at the Robins Center in Richmond, Virginia as members of the Atlantic 10 Conference.

== Previous season ==
The Spiders finished the 2024–25 season with a record of 10–22, including 5–13 in Atlantic 10 play. As the No. 13 seed in the A-10 tournament, they lost in the first round to Davidson.

== Offseason ==
=== Departures ===
Name	Number	Pos.	Height	Weight	Year	Hometown	Reason for departure
DeLonnie Hunt	3	G	6'0"	175	GS Senior	Upper Marlboro, MD	Graduated
Dusan Neskovic	7	F	6'8"	205	GS Senior	Banja Luka, Bosnia and Herzegovina	Graduated
B. Artis White	8	G	5'10"	155	GS Senior	Canton, MI	Graduated
Liam Weaver	10	G	6'2"	190	(redshirt) Junior	Shawnee, KS	Walk-on; Graduated
Jason Roche	11	G	6'5"	200	Senior	Berkeley, CA	Graduated
Ryan Soulis	12	F	6'10"	215	(redshirt) Freshman	Athens, Greece	Transferred to Columbia
Jack Graham	13	G	6'3"	185	Sophomore	Smithfield, RI	Walk-on; Transferred to New Hampshire
Jack D'Entremont	25	F	6'7"	195	GS Senior	Bryn Mawr, PA	Walk-on; Graduated
George Washington III	40	G	6'2"	195	Sophomore	Austin, TX	Transferred to Florida Gulf Coast

=== Incoming transfers ===
Name	Num	Pos.	Height	Weight	Year	Hometown	Previous school
Jaden Daughtry	2	F	6'7"	230	Junior	Richmond, VA	Indiana State
Will Johnston	4	G	6'3"	185	GS Senior	Sydney, Australia	Loyola Marymount
AJ Lopez	6	G	6'5"	185	GS Senior	Queens, NY	Maine
David Thomas	12	G	6'2"	200	Junior	McDonough, GA	DePaul

=== Recruiting classes ===
==== 2025 recruiting class ====
College recruiting
Name	Hometown	School	Height	Weight	Commit date
Aiden Argabright; PG	Richmond, VA	John Marshall High School	5 ft 11 in (1.80 m)	155 lb (70 kg)	Jul 28, 2024
Aiden Argabright; PG	Recruit ratings: Rivals: 247Sports: ESPN: (NR)				
Donovan Richardson; PG	Richmond, VA	Collegiate School	6 ft 6 in (1.98 m)	190 lb (86 kg)	Oct 6, 2024
Donovan Richardson; PG	Recruit ratings: Rivals: 247Sports: ESPN: (NR)				
Will Harper III; SG	Bowie, MD	Gonzaga College High School	6 ft 4 in (1.93 m)	210 lb (95 kg)	Sep 6, 2024
Will Harper III; SG	Recruit ratings: Rivals: 247Sports: ESPN: (NR)				
Dylan Homenick; C	Surry, BC	Perkiomen School	6 ft 11 in (2.11 m)	220 lb (100 kg)	May 27, 2025
Dylan Homenick; C	Recruit ratings: Rivals: 247Sports: ESPN: (NR)				
Overall recruit ranking:
Note: In many cases, Scout, Rivals, 247Sports, On3, and ESPN may conflict in their listings of height and weight.; In these cases, the average was taken. ESPN grades are on a 100-point scale.; Sources: "Rivals.com 2025 Richmond Commitments". Rivals.; "ESPN 2025 Richmond Commitments". ESPN.; "2025 Team Ranking". Rivals.

== Roster ==
2025–26 Richmond Spiders men's basketball team
Players
Coaches

Pos.	#	Name	Height	Weight	Year	Previous school	Hometown
G	1	Mikkel Tyne	5 ft 10 in (1.78 m)	180 lb (82 kg)	Jr	Bishop Walsh School	Toronto, ON
F	2	Jaden Daughtry	6 ft 7 in (2.01 m)	230 lb (104 kg)	Jr	Hargrave Military Academy; Indiana State	Richmond, VA
G	3	Aiden Argabright	5 ft 11 in (1.8 m)	155 lb (70 kg)	Fr	John Marshall High School	Richmond, VA
G	4	Will Johnston	6 ft 3 in (1.91 m)	185 lb (84 kg)	GS	Perkiomen School; Loyola Marymount	Sydney, Australia
G	5	Collin Tanner	6 ft 6 in (1.98 m)	205 lb (93 kg)	So	Combine Academy	Creedmoor, NC
G	6	AJ Lopez	6 ft 5 in (1.96 m)	185 lb (84 kg)	GS	Mt. Zion Prep; Maine	Queens, NY
G	8	Donovan Richardson (redshirt)	6 ft 6 in (1.98 m)	190 lb (86 kg)	Fr	Steward School	Richmond, VA
F	9	Jonathan Beagle	6 ft 10 in (2.08 m)	250 lb (113 kg)	Jr	St. Thomas More School; Albany	Hudson Falls, NY
G	11	Will Harper III	6 ft 4 in (1.93 m)	210 lb (95 kg)	Fr	Gonzaga College High School	Bowie, MD
G	12	David Thomas	6 ft 2 in (1.88 m)	200 lb (91 kg)	Jr	Eagle's Landing High School; DePaul	McDonough, GA
G	15	Kirby Mooney (W)	6 ft 3 in (1.91 m)	205 lb (93 kg)	RS Fr	William Tennent High School	Southampton, PA
C	16	Dylan Homenick (redshirt)	6 ft 11 in (2.11 m)	220 lb (100 kg)	Fr	Perkiomen School	Surrey, BC
C	21	Mike Walz (C)	6 ft 11 in (2.11 m)	260 lb (118 kg)	Sr	Conestoga High School	Berwyn, PA
F	24	Jaylen Robinson	6 ft 6 in (1.98 m)	225 lb (102 kg)	RS Fr	DME Academy	Jacksonville, FL
G	33	Apostolos Roumoglou	6 ft 8 in (2.03 m)	215 lb (98 kg)	Sr	Arion Xanthi Club; UConn	Xanthi, Greece
F	35	Bryson McGlothin	6 ft 8 in (2.03 m)	188 lb (85 kg)	RS Fr	John Paul II High School	Plano, TX

Head coach

- Chris Mooney (Princeton)

Assistant coach(es)

- Peter Thomas (Richmond)
- David Boyden (Western Kentucky)
- Will Gipe (Virginia Tech)
- Jack Fahed (James Madison)

Legend

- (C) Team captain
- (S) Suspended
- (I) Ineligible
- (W) Walk-on
- Injured
- Current redshirt

Roster
Last update: October 14, 2025

== Schedule and results ==
Date time, TV	Rank^{#}	Opponent^{#}	Result	Record	High points	High rebounds	High assists	Site (attendance) city, state
Exhibition
October 25, 2025*; 6:00 p.m.		James Madison	W 63–58		16 – Tyne	7 – Beagle	5 – Walz	Robins Center (4,130); Richmond, VA
Non-conference regular season
November 5, 2025*; 7:00 p.m., ESPN+		Southern Virginia	W 84–56	1–0	12 – Beagle	7 – Walz	3 – Argabright	Robins Center (3,736); Richmond, VA
November 8, 2025*; 6:00 p.m., ESPN+/MASN		East Carolina	W 87–72	2–0	15 – Beagle	7 – Daughtry	3 – Beagle	Robins Center (4,632); Richmond, VA
November 11, 2025*; 7:00 p.m., ESPN+/MASN		William & Mary	W 90–86	3–0	18 – Lopez	10 – Beagle	5 – Johnston	Robins Center (4,226); Richmond, VA
November 19, 2025*; 7:00 p.m., ESPN+/MASN		VMI	W 87–54	4–0	12 – Lopez	9 – Walz	5 – Argabright	Robins Center (4,393); Richmond, VA
November 22, 2025*; 7:00 p.m., ESPN+		Gardner–Webb	W 102–67	5–0	18 – Lopez	9 – Walz	4 – Argabright	Robins Center (4,176); Richmond, VA
November 27, 2025*; 11:00 a.m., ESPN2		vs. Furman; ESPN Events Invitational Imagination bracket semifinals	L 72–73	5–1	12 – Daughtry	10 – Walz	6 – Walz	State Farm Field House; Kissimmee, FL
November 28, 2025*; 12:30 p.m., ESPN+		vs. Charlotte; ESPN Events Invitational Imagination bracket consolation	W 71–66	6–1	17 – Lopez	10 – Beagle	4 – Tyne	State Farm Field House; Kissimmee, FL
December 3, 2025*; 7:30 p.m., ESPN+		at Belmont	W 84–76	7–1	19 – Johnston	6 – Walz	3 – Tied	Curb Event Center (1,405); Nashville, TN
December 6, 2025*; 12:30 p.m., USA		Old Dominion	W 86–77	8–1	17 – Daughtry	8 – Tied	5 – Johnston	Robins Center (4,602); Richmond, VA
December 13, 2025*; 6:00 p.m., ESPN+		Southern Illinois	W 93–84 ^{OT}	9–1	18 – Argabright	8 – Beagle	3 – Tied	Robins Center (4,539); Richmond, VA
December 17, 2025*; 7:00 P.M., FloSports		at Elon	L 70–73	9–2	15 – Lopez	8 – Walz	4 – Tied	Schar Center (1,228); Elon, NC
December 20, 2025*; 6:00 p.m., ESPN+		The Citadel	W 80–56	10–2	17 – Daughtry	7 – Beagle	3 – Tied	Robins Center (4,401); Richmond, VA
December 28, 2025*; 4:00 p.m., ESPN+		Charleston Southern	L 72–77	10–3	22 – Lopez	6 – Daughtry	2 – Tied	Robins Center (4,888); Richmond, VA
A-10 regular season
December 31, 2025; 4:00 p.m., ESPN+/MSN		George Washington	L 85–99	10–4 (0–1)	23 – Daughtry	8 – Walz	3 – Tied	Robins Center (4,806); Richmond, VA
January 4, 2026; 12:00 p.m., USA		at Fordham	W 83–75	11–4 (1–1)	20 – Johnston	6 – Johnston	6 – Johnston	Rose Hill Gymnasium (1,643); Bronx, NY
January 7, 2026; 7:00 p.m., ESPN+		at St. Bonaventure	W 89–80	12–4 (2–1)	24 – Johnston	10 – Walz	3 – Tied	Reilly Center (3,008); St. Bonaventure, NY
January 11, 2026; 12:00 p.m., USA		Saint Joseph's	L 65–67	12–5 (2–2)	15 – Argabright	8 – Walz	5 – Argabright	Robins Center (5,230); Richmond, VA
January 14, 2026; 7:00 p.m., ESPN+/MSN		La Salle	W 74–53	13–5 (3–2)	18 – Lopez	12 – Johnston	4 – Tyne	Robins Center (4,086); Richmond, VA
January 17, 2026; 4:00 p.m., CBSSN		at Saint Louis	L 63–88	13–6 (3–3)	20 – Lopez	5 – Walz	1 – Tied	Chaifetz Arena (9,266); St. Louis, MO
January 21, 2026; 7:00 p.m., ESPN+/MSN		Rhode Island	L 68–69	13–7 (3–4)	20 – Argabright	6 – Daughtry	3 – Tied	Robins Center (4,571); Richmond, VA
January 24, 2026; 3:00 p.m., USA		at George Washington	L 69–85	13–8 (3–5)	15 – Lopez	14 – Walz	4 – Tyne	Charles E. Smith Center (2,508); Washington, D.C.
January 27, 2026; 7:00 p.m., CBSSN		at VCU; Capital City Classic	L 69–77	13–9 (3–6)	17 – Lopez	8 – Walz	2 – Tanner	Siegel Center (7,637); Richmond, VA
January 31, 2026; 4:30 p.m., USA		Davidson	L 54–79	13–10 (3–7)	11 – Johnston	5 – Walz	4 – Robinson	Robins Center (6,123); Richmond, VA
February 7, 2026; 2:00 p.m., ESPN+		at Rhode Island	L 77–82	13–11 (3–8)	19 – Lopez	8 – Walz	5 – Lopez	Ryan Center (4,430); Kingston, RI
February 10, 2026; 7:00 p.m., ESPN+/MSN		George Mason	W 82–70	14–11 (4–8)	16 – Tyne	8 – Beagle	5 – Johnston	Robins Center (4,282); Richmond, VA
February 14, 2026; 6:00 p.m., CBSSN		VCU; Capital City Classic	L 67–78	14–12 (4–9)	17 – Johnston	9 – Walz	3 – Lopez	Robins Center (6,173); Richmond, VA
February 18, 2026; 7:00 p.m., ESPN+		at Davidson	L 63–65	14–13 (4–10)	16 – Argabright	7 – Walz	5 – Walz	John M. Belk Arena (2,597); Davidson, NC
February 21, 2026; 6:00 p.m., ESPN+/WTVR		St. Bonaventure	W 99–94	15–13 (5–10)	20 – Lopez	6 – Roumoglou	6 – Walz	Robins Center (5,502); Richmond, VA
February 28, 2026; 4:00 p.m., CBSSN		at Loyola Chicago	L 66–69	15–14 (5–11)	23 – Lopez	6 – Tanner	4 – Robinson	Gentile Arena (3,349); Chicago, IL
March 3, 2026; 7:00 p.m., ESPN+/MASN		Dayton	L 60–65	15–15 (5–12)	15 – Lopez	9 – Walz	4 – Walz	Robins Center (4,658); Richmond, VA
March 7, 2026; 2:00 p.m., ESPN+		Duquesne	L 77–79	15–16 (5–13)	15 – Lopez	5 – Tanner	5 – Robinson	UPMC Cooper Fieldhouse (2,522); Pittsburgh, PA
A-10 tournament
March 11, 2026; 2:00 p.m., USA	(11)	vs. (14) Loyola Chicago; First round	L 67–75	15–17	12 – Argabright	4 – Tyne	6 – Argabright	PPG Paints Arena (4,654); Pittsburgh, PA
*Non-conference game. ^{#}Rankings from AP poll. (#) Tournament seedings in parentheses. All times are in Eastern.
