= 2025–26 Loyola Ramblers men's basketball team =

American college basketball season

2025–26 Loyola Ramblers men's basketball
- Conference: Atlantic 10 Conference
- Record: 9–24 (4–14 A–10)
- Head coach: Drew Valentine (5th season)
- Assistant coaches: Chris Huey; Brendyn Taylor; Andrew Cobian; Justin Bradley; Keith Clemons
- Home arena: Joseph J. Gentile Arena

2025–26 Atlantic 10 men's basketball standings
	Conf.				Overall
Team	W		L	PCT	W		L	PCT
Saint Louis	15	–	3	.833	29	–	6	.829
VCU †	15	–	3	.833	28	–	8	.778
Saint Joseph's	13	–	5	.722	24	–	12	.667
Dayton	12	–	6	.667	25	–	12	.676
George Mason	11	–	7	.611	23	–	10	.697
Davidson	10	–	8	.556	20	–	14	.588
Duquesne	9	–	9	.500	18	–	15	.545
Fordham	8	–	10	.444	17	–	15	.531
George Washington	8	–	10	.444	19	–	16	.543
Rhode Island	7	–	11	.389	16	–	16	.500
Richmond	5	–	13	.278	15	–	17	.469
La Salle	5	–	13	.278	9	–	23	.281
St. Bonaventure	4	–	14	.222	17	–	17	.500
Loyola Chicago	4	–	14	.222	9	–	24	.273
† 2026 A-10 tournament winner

The 2025–26 Loyola Ramblers men's basketball team represented Loyola University Chicago during the 2025–26 NCAA Division I men's basketball season. The Ramblers, led by fifth-year head coach Drew Valentine, played their home games at the Joseph J. Gentile Arena in Chicago, Illinois as fourth-year members of the Atlantic 10 Conference.

== Previous season ==
The Ramblers finished the 2024–25 season 25–12, 12–6 in A-10 play, to finish in a tie for third place. They defeated Saint Louis, before falling to top-seeded and eventual tournament champions VCU in the semifinals of the A-10 tournament. They received an at-large bid to the NIT, where they would be defeat San Jose State, San Francisco, and Kent State, before falling to eventual tournament champions Chattanooga in the semifinals.

== Preseason ==
On September 30, 2025, the Atlantic 10 Conference released their preseason poll. Loyola Chicago was picked to finish fifth in the conference, while receiving two first-place votes.

=== Preseason rankings ===
Atlantic 10 Preseason Poll
Place	Team	Votes
1	VCU	342 (11)
2	Saint Louis	341 (11)
3	Dayton	321 (3)
4	George Washington	296
5	Loyola Chicago	286 (2)
6	George Mason	254
7	Saint Joseph's	195
8	St. Bonaventure	185
9	Duquesne	155
10	Richmond	142
11	Davidson	107
12	Rhode Island	102
13	La Salle	56
14	Fordham	53
(#) first-place votes

=== Preseason All-Atlantic 10 Teams ===
Preseason All-Atlantic 10 Teams
Team	Player	Year	Position
First	Miles Rubin	Junior	Center

=== Preseason All-A-10 Defensive Team ===
Preseason All-A-10 Defensive Team
Player	Year	Position
Miles Rubin	Junior	Center

== Roster ==
2025–26 Loyola Ramblers men's basketball team
Players
Coaches

Pos.	#	Name	Height	Weight	Year	Previous school	Hometown
G	0	Deywilk Tavarez	6 ft 2 in (1.88 m)	190 lb (86 kg)	Jr	Charleston	Pennsauken, New Jersey
G	1	Justin Moore	6 ft 3 in (1.91 m)	185 lb (84 kg)	RS Jr	Drexel	Philadelphia, Pennsylvania
F	2	Joshua Ola-Joseph	6 ft 7 in (2.01 m)	215 lb (98 kg)	Sr	California	Brooklyn Park, Minnesota
G	4	Kayde Dotson	6 ft 1 in (1.85 m)	190 lb (86 kg)	So	New Mexico	Beaumont, Texas
G	5	Daniil Glazkov	6 ft 6 in (1.98 m)	210 lb (95 kg)	So	IMG Academy	Krasnodar, Russia
G	7	Dominick Harris	6 ft 3 in (1.91 m)	190 lb (86 kg)	GS	UCLA	Murrieta, California
G	8	Nic Anderson	6 ft 4 in (1.93 m)	180 lb (82 kg)	Fr	Olathe South High School	Olathe, Kansas
C	9	Alexander Richardson	6 ft 9 in (2.06 m)	240 lb (109 kg)	Sr	ART Giants Düsseldorf	Glasgow, Scotland
G	10	Chuck Love III	6 ft 7 in (2.01 m)	195 lb (88 kg)	Fr	La Lumiere School	Lincoln, Nebraska
F	13	Xavier Amos	6 ft 8 in (2.03 m)	235 lb (107 kg)	Sr	Wisconsin	Chicago, Illinois
G	14	Caleb Reese	5 ft 11 in (1.8 m)	160 lb (73 kg)	Sr	De La Salle High School	Warren, Michigan
G	22	Sam Yurasek	6 ft 3 in (1.91 m)	165 lb (75 kg)	Jr	Prolific Prep	Napa, California
C	24	Miles Rubin	6 ft 10 in (2.08 m)	220 lb (100 kg)	Jr	Simeon Career Academy	Chicago, Illinois
G	28	Kymany Houinsou	6 ft 7 in (2.01 m)	210 lb (95 kg)	Sr	Washington State	Mulhouse, France
F	30	Brayden Young	6 ft 9 in (2.06 m)	210 lb (95 kg)	RS Fr	Cypress Falls High School	Houston, Texas
F	31	Zachary Royster	6 ft 7 in (2.01 m)	220 lb (100 kg)	Sr	Lindblom Math & Science Academy	Chicago, Illinois

Head coach

- Drew Valentine (Oakland)

Assistant coach(es)

- Chris Huey (Kansas)
- Brendyn Taylor (USC)
- Andrew Cobian (Centenary)
- Justin Bradley (Guilford)
- Keith Clemons (Loyola Chicago)

Legend

- (C) Team captain
- (S) Suspended
- (I) Ineligible
- (W) Walk-on
- Injured
- Current redshirt

Roster
Last update: December 7, 2025

== Schedule and results ==
Date time, TV	Rank^{#}	Opponent^{#}	Result	Record	High points	High rebounds	High assists	Site (attendance) city, state
Exhibition
October 19, 2025*; 6:00 pm		at DePaul	L 90–92 ^{OT}	–	26 – Moore	7 – Rubin	6 – Moore	Wintrust Arena (4,153); Chicago, IL
October 28, 2025*; 7:00 pm		St. Francis (IL)	W 93–44	–	17 – Dotson	8 – Richardson	5 – Love III	Joseph J. Gentile Arena (2,037); Chicago, IL
Non-conference regular season
November 3, 2025*; 7:00 pm, Marquee/ESPN+		Cleveland State	W 91–88	1–0	16 – Tied	6 – Rubin	6 – Moore	Joseph J. Gentile Arena (2,581); Chicago, IL
November 6, 2025*; 8:00 pm, Marquee/ESPN+		Mercyhurst	L 65–73	1–1	25 – Moore	7 – Rubin	8 – Moore	Joseph J. Gentile Arena (2,016); Chicago, IL
November 9, 2025*; 4:00 pm, Marquee/ESPN+		vs. North Texas	L 62–64	1–2	12 – Love III	7 – Love III	4 – Houinsou	Now Arena (789); Hoffman Estates, IL
November 13, 2025*; 6:30 pm, ESPN+		at Wichita State	L 74−95	1−3	16 – Tavarez	6 – Rubin	7 – Moore	Charles Koch Arena (5,661); Wichita, KS
November 16, 2025*; 4:00 pm, Marquee/ESPN+		Colorado State	L 67−80	1−4	13 – Moore	6 – Ola-Joseph	5 – Tavarez	Joseph J. Gentile Arena (2,999); Chicago, IL
November 21, 2025*; 7:00 pm, Marquee/ESPN+		Northern Illinois	L 59–76	1–5	16 – Rubin	7 – Rubin	5 – Moore	Joseph J. Gentile Arena (2,862); Chicago, IL
November 25, 2025*; 3:00 pm, CBSSN		vs. Northern Iowa; Acrisure Holiday Invitational semifinals	L 51–72	1–6	9 – Tied	7 – Moore	4 – Dotson	Acrisure Arena; Thousand Palms, CA
November 26, 2025*; 1:00 pm, CBSSN		vs. San Jose State; Acrisure Holiday Invitational third-place game	L 51–63	1–7	13 – Tied	10 – Rubin	5 – Moore	Acrisure Arena; Thousand Palms, CA
December 2, 2025*; 7:00 pm, Marquee/ESPN+		Central Michigan	W 83–72	2–7	21 – Moore	7 – Rubin	6 – Houinsou	Joseph J. Gentile Arena (1,726); Chicago, IL
December 6, 2025*; 1:30 pm, USA		Princeton	W 73–68	3–7	21 – Moore	10 – Rubin	6 – Moore	Joseph J. Gentile Arena (2,699); Chicago, IL
December 14, 2025*; 4:00 pm, Marquee/ESPN+		Chicago State	L 75–84	3–8	18 – Amos	11 – Rubin	5 – Moore	Joseph J. Gentile Arena (1,972); Chicago, IL
December 17, 2025*; 9:00 pm, ESPN+		vs. San Francisco	L 71–85	3–9	17 – Amos	7 – Amos	3 – Dotson	Chase Center; San Francisco, CA
December 20, 2025*; 4:00 pm, BallerTV		vs. Santa Clara	W 80–78	4–9	26 – Dotson	6 – Amos	3 – Houinsou	Kaiser Permanente Arena; Santa Cruz, CA
A-10 regular season
December 31, 2025; 11:00 am, ESPN+		at Rhode Island	W 61–57	5–9 (1–0)	19 – Moore	7 – Houinsou	5 – Moore	Ryan Center (3,712); Kingston, RI
January 3, 2026; 1:00 pm, CBSSN		Dayton	L 68–70	5–10 (1–1)	19 – Moore	11 – Rubin	5 – Tied	Joseph J. Gentile Arena (3,777); Chicago, IL
January 7, 2026; 8:00 pm, CBSSN		Davidson	L 64–79	5–11 (1–2)	13 – Tied	8 – Ola-Joseph	4 – Houinsou	Joseph J. Gentile Arena (1,619); Chicago, IL
January 10, 2026; 2:00 pm, CBSSN		at George Washington	L 66–101	5–12 (1–3)	20 – Ola-Joseph	10 – Rubin	7 – Houinsou	Charles E. Smith Center (2,169); Washington, D.C.
January 13, 2026; 6:00 pm, CBSSN		George Mason	L 74–82	5–13 (1–4)	17 – Anderson	7 – Anderson	6 – Tied	Joseph J. Gentile Arena (2,405); Chicago, IL
January 16, 2026; 7:30 pm, ESPN2		at Dayton	L 51–78	5–14 (1–5)	14 – Rubin	8 – Rubin	3 – Tied	UD Arena (13,407); Dayton, OH
January 20, 2026; 6:00 pm, ESPN+		at St. Bonaventure	L 70–84	5–15 (1–6)	20 – Ola-Joseph	12 – Rubin	6 – Reese	Reilly Center (3,209); St. Bonaventure, NY
January 24, 2026; 1:00 pm, Marquee/ESPN+		Duquesne	L 59–71	5–16 (1–7)	12 – Amos	10 – Rubin	5 – Tavarez	Joseph J. Gentile Arena (2,737); Chicago, IL
January 27, 2026; 8:00 pm, CBSSN		Saint Joseph's	L 64–85	5–17 (1–8)	13 – Ola-Joseph	10 – Rubin	4 – Rubin	Joseph J. Gentile Arena (2,129); Chicago, IL
January 30, 2026; 8:00 pm, ESPN		at VCU	L 75–89	5–18 (1–9)	21 – Rubin	10 – Rubin	5 – Moore	Siegel Center (7,637); Richmond, VA
February 3, 2026; 7:00 pm, Marquee/ESPN+		La Salle	W 71–61	6−18 (2−9)	16 – Ola-Joseph	11 – Rubin	5 – Rubin	Joseph J. Gentile Arena (1,906); Chicago, IL
February 6, 2026; 5:00 pm, CBSSN		at Davidson	L 64−84	6−19 (2−10)	17 – Rubin	7 – Tied	3 – Ola-Joseph	John M. Belk Arena (3,520); Davidson, NC
February 13, 2026; 7:30 pm, ESPN2		No. 18 Saint Louis	L 59–86	6–20 (2–11)	12 – Moore	6 – Glazkov	4 – Tied	Joseph J. Gentile Arena (4,557); Chicago, IL
February 18, 2026; 6:00 pm, ESPN+		at Fordham	L 59–62	6–21 (2–12)	19 – Amos	10 – Richardson	6 – Moore	Rose Hill Gymnasium (1,212); Bronx, NY
February 21, 2026; 11:00 am, ESPN2		at Saint Joseph's	L 61–75	6–22 (2–13)	14 – Tied	9 – Rubin	5 – Rubin	Hagan Arena (2,847); Philadelphia, PA
February 28, 2026; 3:00 pm, CBSSN		Richmond	W 69–66	7–22 (3–13)	19 – Rubin	6 – Richardson	3 – Tied	Joseph J. Gentile Arena (3,349); Chicago, IL
March 4, 2026; 7:00 pm, CBSSN		at No. 25 Saint Louis	L 65–79	7–23 (3–14)	25 – Amos	5 – Tavarez	3 – Tied	Chaifetz Arena; St. Louis, MO
March 7, 2026; 1:00 pm, USA		George Washington	W 68–62	8–23 (4–14)	17 – Dotson	9 – Richardson	6 – Rubin	Joseph J. Gentile Arena (2,714); Chicago, IL
A-10 tournament
March 11, 2026; 1:00 p.m., USA	(14)	vs. (11) Richmond; First round	W 75–67	9–23	26 – Ola-Joseph	7 – Ola-Joseph	4 – Tied	PPG Paints Arena (4,654); Pittsburgh, PA
March 12, 2026; 6:30 p.m., USA	(14)	vs. (6) Davidson; Second round	L 59–64 ^{OT}	9–24	20 – Rubin	9 – Rubin	6 – Tavarez	PPG Paints Arena (7,526); Pittsburgh, PA
*Non-conference game. ^{#}Rankings from AP Poll. (#) Tournament seedings in parentheses. All times are in Central.
