= 2025–26 St. Bonaventure Bonnies men's basketball team =

American college basketball season

2025–26 St. Bonaventure Bonnies men's basketball
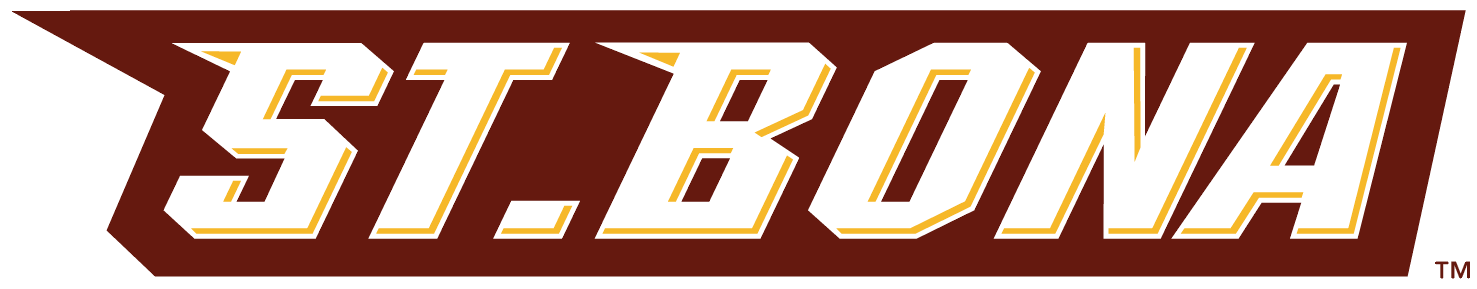
- Conference: Atlantic 10 Conference
- Record: 17–17 (4–14 A–10)
- Head coach: Mark Schmidt (19th season)
- Associate head coach: Sean Neal
- Assistant coaches: Chris Lowe; Nick Schmidt
- Home arena: Reilly Center

2025–26 Atlantic 10 men's basketball standings
	Conf.				Overall
Team	W		L	PCT	W		L	PCT
Saint Louis	15	–	3	.833	28	–	5	.848
VCU †	15	–	3	.833	27	–	7	.794
Saint Joseph's	13	–	5	.722	22	–	11	.667
Dayton	12	–	6	.667	23	–	11	.676
George Mason	11	–	7	.611	23	–	10	.697
Davidson	10	–	8	.556	20	–	14	.588
Duquesne	9	–	9	.500	18	–	15	.545
Fordham	8	–	10	.444	17	–	15	.531
George Washington	8	–	10	.444	18	–	15	.545
Rhode Island	7	–	11	.389	16	–	16	.500
Richmond	5	–	13	.278	15	–	17	.469
La Salle	5	–	13	.278	9	–	23	.281
St. Bonaventure	4	–	14	.222	17	–	17	.500
Loyola Chicago	4	–	14	.222	9	–	24	.273
† 2026 A-10 tournament winner As of March 17, 2026; Rankings from AP Poll

The 2025–26 St. Bonaventure Bonnies men's basketball team represented St. Bonaventure University during the 2025–26 NCAA Division I men's basketball season. The Bonnies, led by 19th-year head coach Mark Schmidt, played their home games at the Reilly Center in St. Bonaventure, New York as members of the Atlantic 10 Conference.

== Previous season ==
The Bonnies finished the 2024–25 season with a 22–12 record, going an even 9–9 in conference play. St. Bonaventure entered the A-10 tournament as an 8th seed, defeating Duquesne in the second round, before losing to VCU in the quarterfinals. The team was invited to the NIT as a 3 seed. The Bonnies lost their first-round game to Kent State to end their season.

== Preseason ==
On September 30, 2025, the Atlantic 10 Conference released their preseason poll. St. Bonaventure was picked to finish eighth in the conference.

=== Preseason rankings ===
Atlantic 10 Preseason Poll
Place	Team	Votes
1	VCU	342 (11)
2	Saint Louis	341 (11)
3	Dayton	321 (3)
4	George Washington	296
5	Loyola Chicago	286 (2)
6	George Mason	254
7	Saint Joseph's	195
8	St. Bonaventure	185
9	Duquesne	155
10	Richmond	142
11	Davidson	107
12	Rhode Island	102
13	La Salle	56
14	Fordham	53
(#) first-place votes

=== Preseason All-Atlantic 10 Teams ===
Preseason All-Atlantic 10 Teams
Team	Player	Year	Position
Second	Dasonte Bowen	Senior	Guard

== Roster ==
2025–26 St. Bonaventure Bonnies men's basketball team
Players
Coaches

Pos.	#	Name	Height	Weight	Year	Previous school	Hometown
F	00	Frank Mitchell	6 ft 8 in (2.03 m)	270 lb (122 kg)	Sr	Minnesota	Toronto, Ontario
G	1	Ilia Ermakov	6 ft 6 in (1.98 m)	—	Fr	CSKA Moscow II	Kursk, Russia
G	2	Amar'e Marshall	6 ft 4 in (1.93 m)	210 lb (95 kg)	RS Sr	Albany	Montclair, New Jersey
F	3	Daniel Egbuniwe	6 ft 7 in (2.01 m)	210 lb (95 kg)	Sr	Tennessee Tech	Memphis, Tennessee
F	4	John Ikpotokin	6 ft 7 in (2.01 m)	—	Fr	Rothesay Netherwood School	Dublin, Ireland
G	5	Dasonte Bowen	6 ft 2 in (1.88 m)	190 lb (86 kg)	RS Jr	Iowa	Boston, Massachusetts
G	7	Brayden Jackson	6 ft 8 in (2.03 m)	200 lb (91 kg)	So	Buffalo	Milton, Ontario
G	8	Darryl Simmons II	5 ft 11 in (1.8 m)	175 lb (79 kg)	Jr	Gardner–Webb	Detroit, Michigan
G	15	Jack DeRose (W)	6 ft 0 in (1.83 m)	175 lb (79 kg)	Jr	Olean High School	Olean, New York
G	20	Achille Lonati	6 ft 5 in (1.96 m)	—	Fr	Olimpia Milano	Pavia, Italy
F/C	21	Xander Wedlow	6 ft 10 in (2.08 m)	245 lb (111 kg)	So	University Preparatory Academy	Detroit, Michigan
G	24	Cayden Charles	6 ft 3 in (1.91 m)	185 lb (84 kg)	Sr	North Georgia	Kennesaw, Georgia
G	30	Broek Ostrom (W)	6 ft 2 in (1.88 m)	180 lb (82 kg)	Sr	Holley High School	Holley, New York
F	32	Joe Grahovac	6 ft 10 in (2.08 m)	215 lb (98 kg)	So	Fullerton College	Santa Ana, California
C	33	Andrew Osasuyi	6 ft 9 in (2.06 m)	—	Fr	College Basket Borgomanero	Magenta, Italy

Head coach

- Mark Schmidt (Boston College)

Assistant coach(es)

- Sean Neal (La Salle)
- Chris Lowe (UMass)
- Nick Schmidt (Alfred State)

Legend

- (C) Team captain
- (S) Suspended
- (I) Ineligible
- (W) Walk-on
- Injured
- Current redshirt

Roster
Last update: December 7, 2025

== Schedule and results ==
Date time, TV	Rank^{#}	Opponent^{#}	Result	Record	High points	High rebounds	High assists	Site (attendance) city, state
Exhibition
October 29, 2025*; 7:00 p.m.		Alfred	W 101–40	–	– – –	– – –	– – –	Reilly Center; St. Bonaventure, NY
Non-conference regular season
November 3, 2025*; 11:00 a.m., YouTube		vs. Bradley; Field of 68 Opening Day Marathon	W 69–63	1–0	24 – Simmons II	9 – Mitchell	4 – Simmons II	Rock Hill Sports & Event Center (749); Rock Hill, SC
November 8, 2025*; 4:00 p.m., ESPN+		Canisius	W 89–70	2–0	20 – Mitchell	11 – Mitchell	4 – Bowen	Reilly Center (4,260); St. Bonaventure, NY
November 12, 2025*; 7:00 p.m., YES/ESPN+		Siena; Franciscan Cup	W 75–66	3–0	25 – Doty	10 – Mitchell	5 – Marshall	Reilly Center (3,451); St. Bonaventure, NY
November 15, 2025*; 4:00 p.m., YES/ESPN+		Youngstown State	W 84–80	4–0	18 – Charles	7 – Mitchell	5 – Bowen	Reilly Center (4,081); St. Bonaventure, NY
November 20, 2025*; 6:00 p.m., ESPN+		Robert Morris	W 75–61	5–0	19 – Mitchell	16 – Mitchell	5 – Tied	Reilly Center (3,353); St. Bonaventure, NY
November 25, 2025*; 6:00 p.m., FS1		vs. No. 16 North Carolina; Fort Myers Tip-Off Beach Division	L 70–85	5–1	22 – Simmons II	6 – Tied	3 – Tied	Suncoast Credit Union Arena (3,500); Ft. Myers, FL
November 27, 2025*; 12:00 p.m., FS1		vs. East Carolina; Fort Myers Tip-Off Beach Division	W 67–58	6–1	17 – Tied	12 – Mitchell	4 – Simmons II	Suncoast Credit Union Arena (1,342); Ft. Myers, FL
November 30, 2025*; 3:30 p.m., ESPN2		at Florida Atlantic	W 70–65	7–1	16 – Charles	11 – Mitchell	4 – Bowen	Eleanor R. Baldwin Arena (3,161); Boca Raton, FL
December 3, 2025*; 7:00 p.m., ESPN+		Bloomsburg	W 83–43	8–1	19 – Simmons II	11 – Mitchell	5 – Tied	Reilly Center (2,809); St. Bonaventure, NY
December 6, 2025*; 2:00 p.m., ESPN+		at Buffalo	W 77–69	9–1	15 – Egbuniwe	13 – Mitchell	5 – Simmons II	Alumni Arena (5,616); Amherst, NY
December 10, 2025*; 7:00 p.m., ESPN+		Colgate	W 85–77	10–1	20 – Charles	18 – Mitchell	9 – Bowen	Reilly Center (3,049); St. Bonaventure, NY
December 13, 2025*; 5:00 p.m., PTB Live		vs. Ohio; Cleveland Hoops Showdown	L 83–88 ^{OT}	10–2	27 – Mitchell	14 – Mitchell	5 – Bowen	Rocket Arena (6,165); Cleveland, OH
December 20, 2025*; 1:00 p.m., YES/ESPN+		Le Moyne	W 92–81	11–2	21 – Mitchell	10 – Charles	4 – Bowen	Reilly Center (3,638); St. Bonaventure, NY
A-10 regular season
December 31, 2025; 2:00 p.m., ESPN+		at VCU	L 82–89	11–3 (0–1)	24 – Mitchell	7 – Mitchell	7 – Simmons II	Siegel Center (7,637); Richmond, VA
January 7, 2026; 7:00 p.m., ESPN+		Richmond	L 80–89	11–4 (0–2)	18 – Simmons II	12 – Mitchell	5 – Mitchell	Reilly Center (3,008); St. Bonaventure, NY
January 10, 2026; 12:00 p.m., USA		Fordham	L 77–81	11–5 (0–3)	24 – Simmons II	8 – Charles	4 – Mitchell	Reilly Center (3,854); St. Bonaventure, NY
January 14, 2026; 7:00 p.m., ESPN+		at Saint Joseph's	L 64–68	11–6 (0–4)	22 – Mitchell	8 – Mitchell	8 – Bowen	Hagan Arena (2,247); Philadelphia, PA
January 17, 2026; 2:30 p.m., USA		at La Salle	L 74–78	11–7 (0–5)	26 – Mitchell	7 – Mitchell	10 – Bowen	John Glaser Arena (1,430); Philadelphia, PA
January 20, 2026; 7:00 p.m., YES/ESPN+		Loyola Chicago	W 84–70	12–7 (1–5)	26 – Simmons II	11 – Mitchell	8 – Bowen	Reilly Center (3,209); St. Bonaventure, NY
January 23, 2026; 5:30 p.m., ESPN2		No. 24 Saint Louis	L 62–97	12–8 (1–6)	17 – Bowen	7 – Tied	2 – Tied	Reilly Center (4,023); St. Bonaventure, NY
January 28, 2026; 7:00 p.m., ESPN+		at Duquesne	W 87–79	13–8 (2–6)	31 – Simmons II	9 – Charles	7 – Mitchell	UPMC Cooper Fieldhouse (2,341); Pittsburgh, PA
January 31, 2026; 6:30 p.m., USA		George Mason	L 73–77	13–9 (2–7)	25 – Mitchell	6 – Mitchell	8 – Bowen	Reilly Center (4,338); St. Bonaventure, NY
February 3, 2026; 7:00 p.m., CBSSN		at Dayton	L 70–72	13–10 (2–8)	17 – Simmons II	12 – Mitchell	4 – Bowen	UD Arena (13,407); Dayton, OH
February 7, 2026; 2:00 p.m., ESPN+		at Fordham	W 70–67	14–10 (3–8)	23 – Simmons II	6 – Tied	6 – Mitchell	Rose Hill Gymnasium (2,175); The Bronx, NY
February 14, 2026; 4:00 p.m., ESPN+		Duquesne	L 73–78	14–11 (3–9)	20 – Mitchell	13 – Mitchell	4 – Mitchell	Reilly Center (4,112); St. Bonaventure, NY
February 18, 2026; 7:00 p.m., YES/ESPN+		Saint Joseph's	L 65–71	14–12 (3–10)	18 – Simmons II	12 – Mitchell	6 – Mitchell	Reilly Center (3,678); St. Bonaventure, NY
February 21, 2026; 6:00 p.m., ESPN+		at Richmond	L 94–99	14–13 (3–11)	30 – Simmons II	10 – Mitchell	10 – Bowen	Robins Center (5,502); Richmond, VA
February 26, 2026; 5:00 p.m., YES/ESPN+		Rhode Island	W 94–76	15–13 (4–11)	23 – Mitchell	10 – Tied	7 – Bowen	Reilly Center (2,708); St. Bonaventure, NY
February 28, 2026; 2:00 p.m., ESPN+		at George Mason	L 58–71	15–14 (4–12)	16 – Bowen	16 – Mitchell	5 – Simmons II	EagleBank Arena (4,770); Fairfax, VA
March 4, 2026; 7:00 p.m., ESPN+		at George Washington	L 82–91 ^{OT}	15–15 (4–13)	22 – Mitchell	18 – Mitchell	5 – Mitchell	Charles E. Smith Center (1,952); Washington, D.C.
March 7, 2026*; 12:00 p.m., USA		Davidson	L 63–68	15–16 (4–14)	21 – Charles	13 – Mitchell	7 – Bowen	Reilly Center (3,785); St. Bonaventure, NY
A-10 tournament
March 11, 2026; 11:30 a.m., USA	(13)	vs. (12) La Salle; First round	W 99–80	16–16	21 – Simmons II	9 – Mitchell	9 – Bowen	PPG Paints Arena; Pittsburgh, PA
March 12, 2026; 2:00 p.m., USA	(13)	vs. (5) George Mason; Second round	W 63–57	17–16	20 – Bowen	7 – Tied	3 – Bowen	PPG Paints Arena (5,983); Pittsburgh, PA
March 13, 2026; 2:00 p.m., USA	(13)	vs. (4) Dayton; Quarterfinals	L 63–68	17–17	20 – Simmons II	7 – Egbuniwe	2 – Tied	PPG Paints Arena (7,145); Pittsburgh, PA
*Non-conference game. ^{#}Rankings from AP Poll. (#) Tournament seedings in parentheses. All times are in Eastern Time.
