= 2025–26 Duquesne Dukes men's basketball team =

American college basketball season

2025–26 Duquesne Dukes men's basketball
- Conference: Atlantic 10 Conference
- Record: 18–15 (9–9 A–10)
- Head coach: Dru Joyce III (2nd season)
- Assistant coaches: Rick McFadden; Julian Sullinger; Jordan Talley; Ari Stern; Chase Goldstein
- Home arena: UPMC Cooper Fieldhouse

2025–26 Atlantic 10 men's basketball standings
	Conf.				Overall
Team	W		L	PCT	W		L	PCT
Saint Louis	15	–	3	.833	29	–	6	.829
VCU †	15	–	3	.833	28	–	8	.778
Saint Joseph's	13	–	5	.722	24	–	12	.667
Dayton	12	–	6	.667	25	–	12	.676
George Mason	11	–	7	.611	23	–	10	.697
Davidson	10	–	8	.556	20	–	14	.588
Duquesne	9	–	9	.500	18	–	15	.545
Fordham	8	–	10	.444	17	–	15	.531
George Washington	8	–	10	.444	19	–	16	.543
Rhode Island	7	–	11	.389	16	–	16	.500
Richmond	5	–	13	.278	15	–	17	.469
La Salle	5	–	13	.278	9	–	23	.281
St. Bonaventure	4	–	14	.222	17	–	17	.500
Loyola Chicago	4	–	14	.222	9	–	24	.273
† 2026 A-10 tournament winner

The 2025–26 Duquesne Dukes men's basketball team represented Duquesne University during the 2025–26 NCAA Division I men's basketball season. The Dukes, led by second-year head coach Dru Joyce III, played their home games at the UPMC Cooper Fieldhouse in Pittsburgh, Pennsylvania as a member of the Atlantic 10 Conference (A-10).

== Previous season ==
The Dukes finished the 2024–25 season 13–19 overall and 8–10 in A-10 play, placing ninth in the conference in their first season under head coach Dru Joyce III. After an 0–6 start, Duquesne earned its first win of the Joyce era by defeating Old Dominion 67–54 at the Cayman Islands Classic (Nov. 26), then beat Towson 65–47 in Akron (Dec. 14) and UC Irvine 70–54 in Pittsburgh (Dec. 21) during a midseason run that evened the record at 9–9.

Duquesne’s season ended in the second round of the A-10 tournament, where they fell to St. Bonaventure 64–59 after leading by 13 in the second half.

== Offseason ==
=== Departures ===
Name	Number	Pos.	Height	Weight	Year	Hometown	Reason for departure
Hassan Drame	33	F	6'7"	200	GS	Bamako, Mali	Graduated / exhausted eligibility after 2023–24; last played at Duquesne in 2023–24.
Eli Wilborn	25	F	6'8"	215	So.	Middletown, Connecticut	Transferred to James Madison
Tre Dinkins	0	G	6'2"	190	Sr.	Chester, Pennsylvania	Transferred to George Washington
Matúš Hronský	14	F	6'8"	205	Jr.	Poruba, Slovakia	Transferred to Portland

=== Incoming transfers ===
Name	Number	Pos.	Height	Weight	Year	Hometown	Previous school
Tarence Guinyard	1	G	6' 2"	170	Senior	Tampa, Florida	UT Martin
Jimmie Williams	3	G	6' 5"	210	Junior	Solon, Ohio	South Florida
John Hugley IV	4	F	6' 10"	265	Graduate	Cleveland, Ohio	Xavier
Stef van Bussel	18	C	6' 10"	235	(redshirt) Sophomore	Ommel, Netherlands	College of Charleston

=== 2025 recruiting class ===
College recruiting information (2025)
Name	Hometown	School	Height	Weight	Commit date
Arness Lawson #29 PG	Pickerington, OH	Pickerington North High School	6 ft 1 in (1.85 m)	165 lb (75 kg)	Sep 19, 2024
Arness Lawson #29 PG	Recruit ratings: Rivals: 247Sports: ESPN: (79)				
Overall recruit ranking:
Note: In many cases, Scout, Rivals, 247Sports, On3, and ESPN may conflict in their listings of height and weight.; In these cases, the average was taken. ESPN grades are on a 100-point scale.; Sources: "2025 Team Ranking". Rivals.com.

== Roster ==
2025–26 Duquesne Dukes men's basketball team
Players
Coaches

Pos.	#	Name	Height	Weight	Year	Previous school	Hometown
G	0	Brandon Hall	6 ft 4 in (1.93 m)	190 lb (86 kg)	RS Jr	Thornton Township; Howard College	Chicago, IL
G	1	Tarence Guinyard	6 ft 2 in (1.88 m)	170 lb (77 kg)	Sr	Lee High School (FL); UT Martin	Tampa, FL
F	2	David Dixon	6 ft 9 in (2.06 m)	230 lb (104 kg)	Sr	Speights Academy (FL)	Memphis, TN
G	3	Jimmie Williams	6 ft 5 in (1.96 m)	210 lb (95 kg)	Jr	Solon; South Florida	Solon, OH
F	4	John Hugley IV	6 ft 10 in (2.08 m)	265 lb (120 kg)	GS	Brush High School; Xavier	Cleveland, OH
G	5	Cam Crawford	6 ft 5 in (1.96 m)	205 lb (93 kg)	RS Sr	Spain Park; Marshall	Birmingham, AL
F	6	Alex Williams	6 ft 5 in (1.96 m)	225 lb (102 kg)	GS	Archbishop Moeller; Furman	Dayton, OH
G	7	Dom Aekins	5 ft 10 in (1.78 m)	155 lb (70 kg)	Fr	Walnut Ridge; Winston-Salem Christian School	Columbus, OH
G	8	Arness Lawson	6 ft 2 in (1.88 m)	180 lb (82 kg)	Fr	Pickerington North	Columbus, OH
F	9	Jakub Nečas	6 ft 10 in (2.08 m)	240 lb (109 kg)	Jr	Gymnázium Blansko	Blansko, Czech Republic
F	17	Frederik Jellum	6 ft 10 in (2.08 m)	210 lb (95 kg)	Fr	Cushing Academy	Copenhagen, Denmark
C	18	Stef van Bussel	6 ft 10 in (2.08 m)	265 lb (120 kg)	RS So	Philips van Horne; Charleston	Ommel, Netherlands
F	27	Lazar Milošević	6 ft 10 in (2.08 m)	258 lb (117 kg)	Fr	Bileća, Republika Srpska, Bosnia and Herzegovina
G	32	Ethan Anish	6 ft 1 in (1.85 m)	187 lb (85 kg)	RS So	Taylor Allderdice	Pittsburgh, PA
G	44	Jake DiMichele	6 ft 4 in (1.93 m)	185 lb (84 kg)	RS So	OLSH; First Love Christian Academy	McKees Rocks, PA

Head coach

- Dru Joyce III (Akron)

Assistant coach(es)

- Rick McFadden (Akron)
- Julian Sullinger (Kent State)
- Jordan Talley (Southeastern)
- Ari Stern (The College of Wooster)
- Chase Goldstein (Florida Gulf Coast)

Legend

- (C) Team captain
- (S) Suspended
- (I) Ineligible
- (W) Walk-on
- Injured
- Current redshirt

Roster
Last update: November 12, 2025

== Schedule and results ==
Date time, TV	Rank^{#}	Opponent^{#}	Result	Record	High points	High rebounds	High assists	Site (attendance) city, state
Exhibition
October 25, 2025*; 1:00 p.m.		at Virginia Tech	W 83–81		21 – Tied	8 – Guinyard	6 – Guinyard	Cassell Coliseum (4,623); Blacksburg, VA
Non-conference regular season
November 3, 2025*; 7:00 p.m., ESPN+		Niagara	W 83–63	1–0	19 – Guinyard	8 – Hugley IV	5 – Tied	UPMC Cooper Fieldhouse (2,133); Pittsburgh, PA
November 7, 2025*; 7:00 p.m., ESPN+/SNP		Sacred Heart; Villanova Challenge	W 92–80	2–0	25 – Tied	9 – J. Williams	7 – Guinyard	UPMC Cooper Fieldhouse (2,112); Pittsburgh, PA
November 11, 2025*; 8:00 p.m., ESPN+		Queens (NC); Villanova Challenge	W 87–81 ^{OT}	3–0	27 – Hugley IV	11 – Hugley IV	7 – Guinyard	UPMC Cooper Fieldhouse (2,088); Pittsburgh, PA
November 15, 2025*; 8:00 p.m., TNT/TruTV		at Villanova; Villanova Challenge	L 77–87	3–1	30 – Guinyard	8 – Nečas	4 – Guinyard	Finneran Pavilion (6,501); Villanova, PA
November 19, 2025*; 7:00 p.m., ESPN+		Loyola (MD)	W 92–78	4–1	20 – Hugley IV	10 – Necas	6 – Guinyard	UPMC Cooper Fieldhouse (2,135); Pittsburgh, PA
November 22, 2025*; 4:00 p.m.		vs. Northeastern; Morgan & Morgan Classic	L 86–93	4–2	19 – Guinyard	6 – Hugley IV	3 – Tied	LeBron James Arena (1,118); Akron, OH
November 26, 2025*; 6:00 p.m., ESPN+		Central State	W 101–80	5–2	20 – J. Williams	6 – Hugley IV	6 – Guinyard	UPMC Cooper Fieldhouse (1,926); Pittsburgh, PA
December 2, 2025*; 7:00 p.m., ESPN+/SNP		William & Mary	L 79–83	5–3	16 – J. Williams	7 – Edwards	4 – Guinyard	UPMC Cooper Fieldhouse (2,033); Pittsburgh, PA
December 6, 2025*; 2:00 p.m., ESPN+		Stony Brook	W 84–75	6–3	25 – Hugley IV	9 – Nečas	6 – Guinyard	UPMC Cooper Fieldhouse (2,104); Pittsburgh, PA
December 10, 2025*; 9:00 p.m., MW Network		at Boise State	L 64–86	6–4	13 – Nečas	9 – Nečas	3 – Guinyard	ExtraMile Arena (9,373); Boise, ID
December 13, 2025*; 10:00 p.m., MW Network		at Nevada	L 75–78	6–5	21 – Guinyard	10 – Nečas	5 – Guinyard	Lawlor Events Center (7,238); Reno, NV
December 22, 2025*; 7:00 p.m., ESPN+		Canisius	W 103–59	7–5	24 – J. Williams	8 – Milošević	9 – Guinyard	UPMC Cooper Fieldhouse (2,088); Pittsburgh, PA
December 27, 2025*; 2:00 p.m., ESPN+		Cleary	W 99–49	8–5	16 – J. Williams	10 – Nečas	4 – A. Williams	UPMC Cooper Fieldhouse (1,943); Pittsburgh, PA
Atlantic 10 regular season
December 30, 2025; 7:00 p.m., ESPN+		at Davidson	W 89–83 ^{2OT}	9–5 (1–0)	24 – Guinyard	13 – Dixon	6 – Guinyard	John M. Belk Arena (4,505); Davidson, NC
January 3, 2026; 12:00 p.m., USA		VCU	L 80–93	9–6 (1–1)	22 – Guinyard	6 – Nečas	5 – Guinyard	UPMC Cooper Fieldhouse (2,643); Pittsburgh, PA
January 7, 2026; 7:00 p.m., ESPN+		at Saint Joseph's	L 90–97 ^{OT}	9–7 (1–2)	20 – Guinyard	12 – Dixon	5 – Tied	Hagan Arena (1,532); Philadelphia, PA
January 13, 2026; 7:00 p.m., ESPN+		Dayton	L 65–71	9–8 (1–3)	15 – Tied	9 – Dixon	6 – Guinyard	UPMC Cooper Fieldhouse (2,956); Pittsburgh, PA
January 17, 2026; 12:30 p.m., USA		at Fordham	W 74–63	10–8 (2–3)	19 – J. Williams	5 – Tied	9 – Guinyard	Rose Hill Gymnasium (1,138); Bronx, NY
January 20, 2026; 7:00 p.m., ESPN+		No. 24 Saint Louis	L 77–81	10–9 (2–4)	28 – J. Williams	10 – Dixon	5 – J. Williams	UPMC Cooper Fieldhouse (2,266); Pittsburgh, PA
January 24, 2026; 2:00 p.m., Marquee/ESPN+		at Loyola Chicago	W 71–59	11–9 (3–4)	23 – Guinyard	10 – J. Williams	4 – Guinyard	Joseph J. Gentile Arena (2,737); Chicago, IL
January 28, 2026; 7:00 p.m., ESPN+		St. Bonaventure	L 79–87	11–10 (3–5)	12 – Tied	7 – A. Williams	12 – Guinyard	UPMC Cooper Fieldhouse (2,341); Pittsburgh, PA
February 1, 2026; 12:00 p.m., USA		Rhode Island	W 76–61	12–10 (4–5)	22 – J. Williams	9 – J. Williams	4 – J. Williams	UPMC Cooper Fieldhouse (2,536); Pittsburgh, PA
February 4, 2026; 7:00 p.m., ESPN+		at George Mason	W 71–65	13–10 (5–5)	25 – A. Williams	7 – Dixon	3 – J. Williams	EagleBank Arena (3,108); Fairfax, VA
February 7, 2026; 2:00 p.m., ESPN+/SNP		George Washington	W 88–86	14–10 (6–5)	27 – Guinyard	8 – A. Williams	4 – Dixon	UPMC Cooper Fieldhouse (2,393); Pittsburgh, PA
February 14, 2026; 4:00 p.m., ESPN+		at St. Bonaventure	W 78–73	15–10 (7–5)	19 – J. Williams	7 – Necas	4 – Hall	Reilly Center (4,112); St. Bonaventure, NY
February 18, 2026; 7:00 p.m., ESPN+		La Salle	W 62–61	16–10 (8–5)	13 – Dixon	10 – Dixon	3 – Hall	UPMC Cooper Fieldhouse (2,288); Pittsburgh, PA
February 21, 2026; 2:00 p.m., WHIO-TV/ESPN+		at Dayton	L 66–78	16–11 (8–6)	16 – Guinyard	7 – Dixon	4 – Tied	UD Arena (13,407); Dayton, OH
February 25, 2026; 7:00 p.m., ESPN+		Davidson	L 56–67	16–12 (8–7)	20 – Guinyard	7 – Dixon	5 – Guinyard	UPMC Cooper Fieldhouse (2,166); Pittsburgh, PA
February 28, 2026; 8:00 p.m., ESPN+		at No. 23 Saint Louis	L 76–91	16–13 (8–8)	27 – Guinyard	7 – Dixon	4 – Tied	Chaifetz Arena (9,937); St. Louis, MO
March 4, 2026; 7:00 p.m., ESPN+		at Rhode Island	L 52–64	16–14 (8–9)	18 – Guinyard	5 – Tied	3 – Guinyard	Ryan Center (3,378); Kingston, RI
March 7, 2026; 2:00 p.m., ESPN+/SNP		Richmond	W 79–77	17–14 (9–9)	22 – A. Williams	11 – Dixon	2 – Tied	UPMC Cooper Fieldhouse (2,522); Pittsburgh, PA
A-10 tournament
March 12, 2026; 5:00 p.m., USA	(7)	vs. (10) Rhode Island; Second round	W 67–61	18–14	22 – A. Williams	9 – Dixon	3 – J. Williams	PPG Paints Arena; Pittsburgh, PA
March 13, 2026; 5:00 p.m., USA	(7)	vs. (2) VCU; Quarterfinals	L 66–71	18–15	20 – A. Williams	8 – A. Williams	7 – Guinyard	PPG Paints Arena; Pittsburgh, PA
*Non-conference game. ^{#}Rankings from AP poll. (#) Tournament seedings in parentheses. All times are in Eastern.
