= 2025–26 La Salle Explorers men's basketball team =

American college basketball season

2025–26 La Salle Explorers men's basketball
- Conference: Atlantic 10 Conference
- Record: 9–23 (5–13 A–10)
- Head coach: Darris Nichols (1st season)
- Assistant coaches: Shane Nichols; Colin Curtin; James Haring; Safet Kastrat; Mike Doyle
- Home arena: John Glaser Arena

2025–26 Atlantic 10 men's basketball standings
| | Conf. | | | | Overall |
| Team | W | | L | PCT | W | | L | PCT |
|---|---|---|---|---|---|---|---|---|
| Saint Louis | 15 | – | 3 | .833 | 29 | – | 6 | .829 |
| VCU † | 15 | – | 3 | .833 | 28 | – | 8 | .778 |
| Saint Joseph's | 13 | – | 5 | .722 | 24 | – | 12 | .667 |
| Dayton | 12 | – | 6 | .667 | 25 | – | 12 | .676 |
| George Mason | 11 | – | 7 | .611 | 23 | – | 10 | .697 |
| Davidson | 10 | – | 8 | .556 | 20 | – | 14 | .588 |
| Duquesne | 9 | – | 9 | .500 | 18 | – | 15 | .545 |
| Fordham | 8 | – | 10 | .444 | 17 | – | 15 | .531 |
| George Washington | 8 | – | 10 | .444 | 19 | – | 16 | .543 |
| Rhode Island | 7 | – | 11 | .389 | 16 | – | 16 | .500 |
| Richmond | 5 | – | 13 | .278 | 15 | – | 17 | .469 |
| La Salle | 5 | – | 13 | .278 | 9 | – | 23 | .281 |
| St. Bonaventure | 4 | – | 14 | .222 | 17 | – | 17 | .500 |
| Loyola Chicago | 4 | – | 14 | .222 | 9 | – | 24 | .273 |
† 2026 A-10 tournament winner

The 2025–26 La Salle Explorers men's basketball team represented La Salle University in the 2025–26 NCAA Division I men's basketball season. The Explorers, led by first-year head coach Darris Nichols, played their home games at John Glaser Arena in Philadelphia, Pennsylvania as members of the Atlantic 10 Conference.

== Previous season ==
The Explorers finished the 2024–25 season 14–19, 5–13 in A-10 play to finish in a tie for 13th place. As the No. 14 seed in the A-10 tournament, they defeated UMass in the first round before losing to Saint Joseph's in the second round.

On February 20, 2025, head coach Fran Dunphy announced his decision to retire at the conclusion of the 2024–25 season. On March 11, La Salle named Radford head coach Darris Nichols as the school's 21st head men's basketball coach.

== Roster ==
2025–26 La Salle Explorers men's basketball team
Players
Coaches

| Pos. | # | Name | Height | Weight | Year | Previous school | Hometown |
|---|---|---|---|---|---|---|---|
| F | 0 | Justin Archer | 6 ft 7 in (2.01 m) | 210 lb (95 kg) | GS | Trinity Pawling; Radford | New Brunswick, NJ |
| G | 1 | Ashton Walker | 6 ft 5 in (1.96 m) | 190 lb (86 kg) | Fr | Catholic HS | Virginia Beach, VA |
| G | 2 | Jaeden Marshall | 6 ft 5 in (1.96 m) | 205 lb (93 kg) | GS | Richmond Hill HS; Niagara | Hinesville, GA |
| G | 3 | Eric Acker | 6 ft 2 in (1.88 m) | 170 lb (77 kg) | Jr | Eagle Academy for Young Men II; LIU | East New York, NY |
| G | 4 | Truth Harris | 6 ft 2 in (1.88 m) | 180 lb (82 kg) | GS | Trinity Pawling; Radford | Mount Vernon, NY |
| F | 5 | Josiah Harris | 6 ft 9 in (2.06 m) | 225 lb (102 kg) | GS | William Penn HS; Radford | Wilmington, DE |
| F | 7 | Noah Collier | 6 ft 9 in (2.06 m) | 235 lb (107 kg) | GS | Westtown School; William & Mary | Mullica Hill, NJ |
| F | 8 | Nas Hart | 6 ft 10 in (2.08 m) | 195 lb (88 kg) | Fr | College Achieve Charter | Trenton, NJ |
| G | 10 | Jaden Johnson | 6 ft 2 in (1.88 m) | 210 lb (95 kg) | So | Fork Union Military Academy; Old Dominion | Walker Mill, MD |
| G | 11 | Josué Grullon | 6 ft 5 in (1.96 m) | 195 lb (88 kg) | Sr | Daytona State College; UT Martin | Santo Domingo, DR |
| G | 12 | Damon Strand | 6 ft 3 in (1.91 m) | 195 lb (88 kg) | Sr | Roselle Catholic HS; Albany | Plainfield, NJ |
| F | 13 | Max Lipacis | 6 ft 7 in (2.01 m) | 225 lb (102 kg) | Jr | Head-Royce School; Drexel | Piedmont, CA |
| F | 24 | Jerome Brewer Jr. | 6 ft 9 in (2.06 m) | 220 lb (100 kg) | RS Jr | Camden HS; McNeese | Camden, NJ |
| F | 25 | Bowyn Beatty | 7 ft 0 in (2.13 m) | 230 lb (104 kg) | Jr | NBA Global Academy; Sacramento State | Canberra, Australia |
| F | 27 | Edwin Daniel | 6 ft 9 in (2.06 m) | 215 lb (98 kg) | Jr | Our Saviour Lutheran; Connors State College | Washington Heights, NY |
| G | 28 | Arlan Masharaliyev | 6 ft 0 in (1.83 m) | 175 lb (79 kg) | Fr | Prolific Prep of Napa Christian | Almaty, Kazakhstan |
| G | 99 | Rob Dockery | 6 ft 6 in (1.98 m) | 215 lb (98 kg) | RS So | Jackson-Reed HS; Texas A&M | Washington, D.C. |

Head coach

- Darris Nichols (West Virginia)

Assistant coach(es)

- Shane Nichols (Wofford)
- Colin Curtin (Niagara)
- James Haring (West Virginia)
- Safet Kastrat (Rider)
- Mike Doyle (Cabrini)

Legend

- (C) Team captain
- (S) Suspended
- (I) Ineligible
- (W) Walk-on
- Injured
- Current redshirt

Roster
Last update: November 9, 2025

== Schedule and results ==
| Date time, TV | Rank^{#} | Opponent^{#} | Result | Record | High points | High rebounds | High assists | Site (attendance) city, state |
Exhibition
| October 29, 2025*; 6:30 p.m. | | Ursinus | W 99–68 | | 17 – Tied | 7 – Archer | 6 – Dockery | John Glaser Arena (411); Philadelphia, PA |
Non-conference regular season
| November 5, 2025*; 6:30 p.m., ESPN+ | | Coppin State | W 87–59 | 1–0 | 18 – Walker | 7 – Tied | 4 – Marshall | John Glaser Arena (1,587); Philadelphia, PA |
| November 8, 2025*; 3:30 p.m., ESPN+ | | Monmouth | W 73–60 | 2–0 | 26 – Marshall | 9 – J. Harris | 9 – Walker | John Glaser Arena (2,942); Philadelphia, PA |
| November 11, 2025*; 7:00 p.m., ESPN+ | | at Temple; Big 5 Classic Pod 1 | L 63–90 | 2–1 | 11 – Dockery | 8 – Dockery | 4 – Walker | Liacouras Center (3,108); Philadelphia, PA |
| November 15, 2025*; 1:00 p.m., Peacock | | vs. Penn State; Basketball on Broad: Autumn Invitational | L 69–83 | 2–2 | 13 – Tied | 7 – Brewer Jr. | 6 – Walker | Xfinity Mobile Arena; Philadelphia, PA |
| November 19, 2025*; 7:00 p.m., CBSSN | | Villanova; Big 5 Classic Pod 1 | L 55–70 | 2–3 | 17 – Acker | 8 – Dockery | 3 – Tied | John Glaser Arena (2,653); Philadelphia, PA |
| November 22, 2025*; 5:00 p.m., ESPN+ | | Lancaster Bible | W 75–46 | 3–3 | 18 – Walker | 10 – Daniel | 4 – Tied | John Glaser Arena (1,100); Philadelphia, PA |
| November 28, 2025*; 2:00 p.m., ESPN+ | | vs. Hofstra; Cathedral Classic | L 58–63 | 3–4 | 13 – Brewer Jr. | 6 – Tied | 6 – Acker | The Palestra; Philadelphia, PA |
| November 29, 2025*; 4:30 p.m., ESPN+ | | at Penn; Cathedral Classic | L 71–73 | 3–5 | 14 – Archer | 7 – Daniel | 7 – Acker | The Palestra (1,989); Philadelphia, PA |
| November 30, 2025*; 12:00 p.m., ESPN+ | | vs. Merrimack; Cathedral Classic | L 60–66 | 3–6 | 16 – J. Harris | 10 – J. Harris | 7 – Dockery | The Palestra; Philadelphia, PA |
| December 6, 2025*; 2:00 p.m., NBC | | vs. Drexel; Big 5 Classic 5th place game | W 69–64 | 4–6 | 21 – J. Harris | 13 – J. Harris | 6 – T. Harris | Xfinity Mobile Arena; Philadelphia, PA |
| December 13, 2025*; 4:00 p.m., NECFR | | at LIU | L 60–70 | 4–7 | 13 – Marshall | 9 – Archer | 5 – Acker | Steinberg Wellness Center (613); Brooklyn, NY |
| December 19, 2025*; 7:00 p.m., ESPN+ | | at High Point | L 72–84 | 4–8 | 22 – Marshall | 7 – J. Harris | 3 – Dockery | Qubein Center (2,058); High Point, NC |
| December 21, 2025*; 4:00 p.m., Peacock | | at No. 2 Michigan | L 50–102 | 4–9 | 15 – Marshall | 6 – Walker | 4 – Walker | Crisler Center (12,707); Ann Arbor, MI |
Atlantic 10 regular season
| December 31, 2025; 2:00 p.m., ESPN+ | | George Mason | L 75–80 | 4–10 (0–1) | 21 – Brewer Jr. | 10 – J. Harris | 5 – Johnson | John Glaser Arena (1,032); Philadelphia, PA |
| January 3, 2026; 2:00 p.m., USA | | at George Washington | L 55–77 | 4–11 (0–2) | 23 – Dockery | 5 – Tied | 5 – Johnson | Charles E. Smith Center (2,124); Washington, D.C. |
| January 7, 2026; 7:00 p.m., ESPN+ | | at Rhode Island | W 79–72 | 5–11 (1–2) | 22 – Dockery | 7 – Dockery | 4 – Johnson | Ryan Center (3,074); Kingston, RI |
| January 10, 2026; 4:00 p.m., USA | | Saint Louis | L 72–84 | 5–12 (1–3) | 19 – J. Harris | 8 – J. Harris | 6 – Johnson | John Glaser Arena (1,045); Philadelphia, PA |
| January 14, 2026; 7:00 p.m., ESPN+ | | at Richmond | L 53–74 | 5–13 (1–4) | 18 – Marshall | 8 – J. Harris | 2 – Tied | Robins Center (4,086); Richmond, VA |
| January 17, 2026; 2:30 p.m., USA | | St. Bonaventure | W 78–74 | 6–13 (2–4) | 27 – Brewer Jr. | 6 – Brewer Jr. | 6 – Dockery | John Glaser Arena (1,430); Philadelphia, PA |
| January 21, 2026; 6:30 p.m., ESPN+ | | Dayton | W 67–64 | 7–13 (3–4) | 25 – Marshall | 7 – Daniel | 6 – Johnson | John Glaser Arena (1,330); Philadelphia, PA |
| January 28, 2026; 7:00 p.m., ESPN+ | | at Fordham | L 58–64 | 7–14 (3–5) | 21 – Brewer Jr. | 9 – Dockery | 5 – Dockery | Rose Hill Gymnasium (738); The Bronx, NY |
| January 31, 2026; 2:30 p.m., USA | | Saint Joseph's | L 58–67 | 7–15 (3–6) | 26 – Dockery | 14 – Dockery | 6 – Walker | John Glaser Arena (2,755); Philadelphia, PA |
| February 3, 2026; 8:00 p.m., ESPN+ | | at Loyola Chicago | L 61–71 | 7–16 (3–7) | 18 – Marshall | 8 – Walker | 8 – Johnson | Joseph J. Gentile Arena (1,906); Chicago, IL |
| February 7, 2026; 3:00 p.m., ESPN+ | | at No. 19 Saint Louis | L 58–82 | 7–17 (3–8) | 19 – Dockery | 8 – Dockery | 5 – Dockery | Chaifetz Arena (9,874); St. Louis, MO |
| February 11, 2026; 6:30 p.m., ESPN+ | | VCU | L 68–77 | 7–18 (3–9) | 17 – Dockery | 8 – Dockery | 7 – Johnson | John Glaser Arena (718); Philadelphia, PA |
| February 18, 2026; 7:00 p.m., ESPN+ | | at Duquesne | L 61–62 | 7–19 (3–10) | 11 – Johnson | 8 – T. Harris | 5 – Johnson | UPMC Cooper Fieldhouse (2,288); Pittsburgh, PA |
| February 21, 2026; 2:30 p.m., ESPN+ | | Rhode Island | W 59–46 | 8–19 (4–10) | 19 – Dockery | 15 – Dockery | 2 – T. Harris | John Glaser Arena (1,152); Philadelphia, PA |
| February 24, 2026; 6:30 p.m., ESPN+ | | George Washington | L 77–104 | 8–20 (4–11) | 25 – Dockery | 7 – Dockery | 5 – T. Harris | John Glaser Arena (1,035); Philadelphia, PA |
| March 1, 2026; 12:00 p.m., USA | | at Davidson | L 64–71 | 8–21 (4–12) | 17 – T. Harris | 6 – Tied | 4 – Johnson | John M. Belk Arena (3,891); Davidson, NC |
| March 4, 2026; 6:30 p.m., ESPN+ | | Fordham | W 87–84 | 9–21 (5–12) | 25 – Dockery | 7 – Tied | 6 – Johnson | John Glaser Arena (1,522); Philadelphia, PA |
| March 7, 2026; 1:00 p.m., ESPN+ | | at Saint Joseph's | L 76–88 | 9–22 (5–13) | 25 – Dockery | 9 – Hart | 3 – Walker | Hagan Arena (2,504); Philadelphia, PA |
Atlantic 10 tournament
| March 11, 2026; 11:30 a.m., USA | (12) | vs. (13) St. Bonaventure; First round | L 80–99 | 9–23 | 33 – Dockery | 10 – Dockery | 6 – Walker | PPG Paints Arena; Pittsburgh, PA |
*Non-conference game. ^{#}Rankings from AP Poll. (#) Tournament seedings in parentheses. All times are in Eastern Time.
