= 2025–26 Atlantic 10 Conference men's basketball season =

- League: NCAA Division I
- Sport: Basketball
- Duration: November 3, 2025 – March 7, 2026
- Teams: 14
- TV partner(s): CBS, CBSSN, USA, ESPN+

NBA Draft

2025–26 NCAA Division I men's basketball season
- First place (tie): Saint Louis; VCU
- Season MVP: Robbie Avila, Saint Louis
- Top scorer: DeJour Reaves, Fordham – 18.7 ppg

Atlantic 10 men's basketball tournament
- Champions: VCU
- Finals MVP: Terrence Hill Jr.

Atlantic 10 Conference men's basketball seasons
- ← 2024–25 2026–27 →

2025–26 Atlantic 10 men's basketball standings
	Conf.				Overall
Team	W		L	PCT	W		L	PCT
Saint Louis	15	–	3	.833	29	–	6	.829
VCU †	15	–	3	.833	28	–	8	.778
Saint Joseph's	13	–	5	.722	24	–	12	.667
Dayton	12	–	6	.667	25	–	12	.676
George Mason	11	–	7	.611	23	–	10	.697
Davidson	10	–	8	.556	20	–	14	.588
Duquesne	9	–	9	.500	18	–	15	.545
Fordham	8	–	10	.444	17	–	15	.531
George Washington	8	–	10	.444	19	–	16	.543
Rhode Island	7	–	11	.389	16	–	16	.500
Richmond	5	–	13	.278	15	–	17	.469
La Salle	5	–	13	.278	9	–	23	.281
St. Bonaventure	4	–	14	.222	17	–	17	.500
Loyola Chicago	4	–	14	.222	9	–	24	.273
† 2026 A-10 tournament winner Rankings from AP Poll

The 2025–26 Atlantic 10 Conference men's basketball season began with practices in October 2025, followed by the start of the 2025–26 NCAA Division I men's basketball season in November. Conference play started in December 2025 and concluded in March 2026. The 2026 Atlantic 10 men's basketball tournament was held at the PPG Paints Arena in Pittsburgh, in March 2026. This was the 50th season of Atlantic 10 Conference basketball. All 14 teams from regular season play earned postseason bids to the 2026 A-10 men's basketball tournament.

== Previous season ==
The 2024–25 season began with non-conference play on November 4, 2024, and conference play on December 30, 2024. The regular season concluded on March 7, 2025. There, George Mason and VCU were the Atlantic 10 regular season co-champions. George Mason won the regular season for the first time since joining the conference, and their first conference regular season title since 2011. The 2025 Atlantic 10 men's basketball tournament was played from March 12, 2025, and finished on March 16, 2025. There, the top two seeds, George Mason and VCU, played each other for the tournament championship. VCU won the final, 68–63.

For the second time in three years, the Atlantic 10 only received one bid to the NCAA tournament, where VCU was awarded the 11 seed. There, they played six-seed BYU and lost in the opening round. A record six Atlantic 10 teams received at-large bids into the 2025 National Invitation Tournament: Dayton, George Mason, Loyola Chicago, Saint Joseph's, Saint Louis, and St. Bonaventure. Loyola Chicago was the furthest advancing A-10 team, reaching the semifinals before losing to eventual NIT champions: Chattanooga. Finally, George Washington accepted a bid into the 2025 College Basketball Crown, where they lost in the first round to Boise State.

VCU guard, Max Shulga, was named the Atlantic 10 Conference Player of the Year. George Mason's Jared Billups received Defense Player of the Year awards, while Mason's head coach Tony Skinn was named Coach of the Year. Shulga was the 57th pick in the 2025 NBA draft.

Following the conclusion of the 2024–25 academic year, UMass left the Atlantic 10 for the Mid-American Conference.

== Head coaches ==
=== Coaching changes ===
- Fordham fired Keith Urgo at the conclusion of the 2024–25 season. On March 28, 2025, Fordham announced the hiring of Mike Magpayo.
- After the 2024–25 season, Fran Dunphy retired as head coach of La Salle. On March 11, 2025, La Salle announced the hiring of Darris Nichols.
- Ryan Odom resigned as the head coach of VCU on March 21, 2025, to accept the head coaching job at his alma mater, Virginia. On March 25, 2025, VCU announced the hiring of Phil Martelli Jr. as his replacement.

=== Coaches ===
Team	Head coach	Previous job	Years at school	Overall record	A10 record	A10 titles	A10 tournament titles	NCAA tournaments	NCAA Final Fours	NCAA championships
Davidson	Matt McKillop	Davidson (Asst.)	4	52–49 (.515)	19–35 (.352)	0	0	0	0	0
Dayton	Anthony Grant	Oklahoma City Thunder (Asst.)	9	173–82 (.678)	100–42 (.704)	1	0	1	0	0
Duquesne	Dru Joyce III	Duquesne (Assoc.)	2	13–19 (.406)	8–10 (.444)	0	0	0	0	0
Fordham	Mike Magpayo	UC Riverside	1	0–0 (–)	0–0 (–)	0	0	0	0	0
George Mason	Tony Skinn	Maryland (Asst.)	2	50–21 (.704)	24–12 (.667)	0	0	0	0	0
George Washington	Chris Caputo	Miami (FL) (Assoc.)	4	55–36 (.604)	23–31 (.426)	0	0	0	0	0
La Salle	Darris Nichols	Radford	1	0–0 (–)	0–0 (–)	0	0	0	0	0
Loyola Chicago	Drew Valentine	Loyola Chicago (Asst.)	5	83–51 (.619)	44–28 (.611)	1	0	0	0	0
Rhode Island	Archie Miller	Indiana	4	42–56 (.429)	18–36 (.333)	0	0	0	0	0
Richmond	Chris Mooney	Air Force	21	361–290 (.555)	180–151 (.544)	1	2	3	0	0
St. Bonaventure	Mark Schmidt	Robert Morris	19	327–238 (.579)	167–139 (.546)	2	2	3	0	0
Saint Joseph's	Steve Donahue	Penn	1	0–0 (–)	0–0 (–)	0	0	0	0	0
Saint Louis	Josh Schertz	Indiana State	2	19–15 (.559)	11–7 (.611)	0	0	0	0	0
VCU	Phil Martelli Jr.	Bryant	1	0–0 (–)	0–0 (–)	0	0	0	0	0

Notes:

- All records, appearances, titles, etc. are from time with current school only.
- Year at school includes 2024–25 season.
- Overall and Atlantic 10 records are from time at current school only and are through the beginning of the season.

== Preseason ==
=== Recruiting classes ===
Rankings
Team	247 Sports	On3Recruits	ESPN	Commits
Davidson	128	96		2
Dayton	88	57	NR	2
Duquesne	152	126	NR	1
Fordham	NR	NR	NR	2
George Mason	85	88	NR	2
George Washington	164	107	NR	1
La Salle	129	NR	NR	2
Loyola Chicago	74	82	NR	2
Rhode Island	128	167	NR	1
Richmond	91	122	NR	2
St. Bonaventure	NR	186	NR	2
Saint Joseph's	108	123	NR	2
Saint Louis	53	92	NR	5
VCU	69	46	NR	2

Notes:

- Rankings are up to date as of September 17, 2025

=== Preseason polls ===
	AP	Blue Ribbon; Yearbook	CBS Sports	Coaches	ESPN	Fox Sports	KenPom	NCAA Sports	Sporting News	Sports; Illustrated
Davidson	–	–	–	–	–	–	118	–	–	121
Dayton	–	–	46	–	–	–	75	–	–	70
Duquesne	–	–	–	–	–	–	108	–	–	132
Fordham	–	–	–	–	–	–	269	–	–	144
George Mason	–	–	–	–	–	–	88	–	–	91
George Washington	–	–	68	–	–	–	67	–	–	77
La Salle	–	–	–	–	–	–	214	–	–	196
Loyola Chicago	–	–	72	–	–	–	156	–	–	66
Rhode Island	–	–	–	–	–	–	113	–	–	138
Richmond	–	–	–	–	–	–	115	–	–	149
St. Bonaventure	–	–	–	–	–	–	110	–	–	98
Saint Joseph's	–	–	–	–	–	–	138	–	–	113
Saint Louis	–	–	52	–	–	–	60	–	–	47
VCU	RV	–	77	RV	–	–	64	–	–	67

==== A-10 Preseason Media poll ====
The preseason poll and Preseason All-Atlantic 10 Teams were released on September 30, 2025, prior to the season beginning and after The results of the poll are below.

===== Preseason poll =====
	A-10 Media	Points
1.	VCU	342 (11)
2.	Saint Louis	341 (11)
3.	Dayton	321 (3)
4.	George Washington	296
5.	Loyola Chicago	286
6.	George Mason	254
7.	Saint Joseph's	195
8.	St. Bonaventure	185
9.	Duquesne	155
10.	Richmond	142
11.	Davidson	107
12.	Rhode Island	102
13.	La Salle	56
14.	Fordham	53
Reference: (#) first-place votes

== Regular season ==
=== Early season tournaments ===
	Tournament	Place/Finish
Davidson	Charleston Classic Lowcountry bracket	2nd
Dayton	ESPN Events Invitational Magic bracket	2nd
Duquesne	Villanova Challenge	2nd
Fordham	Northern Classic	
George Mason	Sunshine Slam Beach bracket	1st
George Washington	Cayman Islands Classic	
La Salle	Cathedral Classic	
Loyola Chicago	Acrisure Series	
Rhode Island	ESPN Events Invitational Adventure bracket	
Richmond	ESPN Events Invitational Imagination bracket	
St. Bonaventure	Fort Myers Tip-Off	
Saint Joseph's	Jersey Jam	
Saint Louis	Acrisure Invitational	
VCU	Battle 4 Atlantis	3rd

=== Conference matrix ===
	DAV	DAY	DUQ	FOR	GMU	GWU	LAS	LOY	URI	RIC	STB	STJ	SLU	VCU
vs. Davidson	—	1–0	1–1	1–1	1–0	0–1	0–1	0–2	1–0	0–2	0–1	1–1	1–0	1–0
vs. Dayton	0–1	—	0–2	0–1	0–1	0–2	1–0	0–2	1–0	0–1	0–1	1–0	1–1	2–0
vs. Duquesne	1–1	2–0	—	0–1	0–1	0–1	0–1	0–1	1–1	0–1	1–1	1–0	2–0	1–0
vs. Fordham	1–1	1–0	1–0	—	1–0	0–1	1–1	0–1	0–2	1–0	1–1	0–1	1–0	2–0
vs. George Mason	0–1	1–0	1–0	0–1	—	1–1	0–1	0–1	1–1	1–0	0–2	1–1	0–1	1–1
vs. George Washington	1–0	2–0	1–0	1–0	1–1	—	0–2	1–1	0–1	0–2	0–1	1–0	1–0	1–0
vs. La Salle	1–0	0–1	1–0	1–1	1–0	2–0	—	1–0	0–2	1–0	0–1	2–0	2–0	1–0
vs. Loyola Chicago	2–0	2–0	1–0	1–0	1–0	1–1	0–1	—	0–1	0–1	1–0	2–0	2–0	1–0
vs. Rhode Island	0–1	0–1	1–1	2–0	1–1	1–0	2–0	1–0	—	0–2	1–0	1–0	0–1	1–0
vs. Richmond	2–0	1–0	1–0	0–1	0–1	2–0	0–1	1–0	2–0	—	0–2	1–0	1–0	2–0
vs. St. Bonaventure	1–0	1–0	1–1	1–1	2–0	1–0	1–0	0–1	0–1	2–0	—	2–0	1–0	1–0
vs. Saint Joseph's	1–1	0–1	0–1	1–0	1–1	0–1	0–2	0–2	0–1	0–1	0–2	—	1–0	1–0
vs. Saint Louis	0–1	1–1	0–2	0–1	1–0	0–1	0–2	0–2	1–0	0–1	0–1	0–1	—	0–2
vs. VCU	0–1	0–2	0–1	0–2	1–1	0–1	0–1	0–1	0–1	0–2	0–1	0–1	2–0	—
Total	10–8	12–6	9–9	8–10	11–7	8–10	5–13	4–14	7–11	5–13	4–14	13–5	15–3	15–3

Through March 10, 2026

== Postseason ==
=== A-10 tournament ===
First round Wednesday, March 11; USA Network
12	La Salle	80
13	St. Bonaventure	99
11	Richmond	67
14	Loyola Chicago	75

Second round Thursday, March 12; USA Network
8	Fordham	62
9	George Washington	66
5	George Mason	57
13	St. Bonaventure	63
7	Duquesne	67
10	Rhode Island	61
6	Davidson	64*
14	Loyola Chicago	59

Quarterfinals; Friday, March 13; USA Network/CNBC
1	Saint Louis	88
9	George Washington	81
4	Dayton	68
13	St. Bonaventure	63
2	VCU	71
7	Duquesne	66
3	Saint Joseph's	70
6	Davidson	58

Semifinals; Saturday, March 14; CBSSN
1	Saint Louis	69
4	Dayton	70
2	VCU	77
3	Saint Joseph's	64

Championship; Sunday, March 15; CBS
4	Dayton	62
2	VCU	70

* denotes overtime period

The 2026 Atlantic 10 Conference basketball tournament was held at the PPG Paints Arena in Pittsburgh, from March 11–15, 2026.

=== NCAA tournament ===
Seed	Region	School	First round	Second round	Sweet 16	Elite Eight	Final Four	Championship
9	Midwest	Saint Louis	W 102–77 vs. (8) Georgia	L 72–95 vs. (1) Michigan	DNP			
11	South	VCU	W 82–78 ^{(OT)} vs. (6) North Carolina	L 55–76 vs. (3) Illinois	DNP			
		W–L (%):	2–0 (1.000)	0–2 (.000)	0–0 (–)	0–0 (–)	0–0 (–)	0–0 (–)
Total: 2–2 (.500)

=== National Invitation Tournament ===
Seed	Bracket	School	1st round	2nd round	Quarterfinals	Semifinals	Championship
2	Winston-Salem	Dayton	W 80–66 vs. Bradley	W 80–61 vs. UNC Wilmington	L 55–61 vs. (4) Illinois State	DNP	
3	Auburn	George Mason	L 71–77 vs. Liberty	DNP			
	Albuquerque	George Washington	W 79–78 vs. (4) Utah Valley	L vs. 61–86 (1) New Mexico	DNP		
	Albuquerque	Saint Joseph's	W 69–64 vs. (3) Colorado State	W 76–75 vs. (2) California	L 69–84 vs. (1) New Mexico	DNP	
	Tulsa	Davidson	L 80–84 vs. (2) Oklahoma State	DNP			
		W–L (%):	3–2 (.600)	2–1 (.667)	0–2 (.000)	0–0 (–)	0–0 (–)
Total: 5–5 (.500)

== See also ==
- 2025–26 Atlantic 10 Conference women's basketball season
