= 2024–25 Davidson Wildcats men's basketball team =

American college basketball season

2024–25 Davidson Wildcats men's basketball
- Conference: Atlantic 10 Conference
- Record: 17–16 (6–12 A-10)
- Head coach: Matt McKillop (3rd season)
- Assistant coaches: Matt Matheny; Will Reigel; Joshua Heyliger
- Home arena: John M. Belk Arena

2024–25 Atlantic 10 men's basketball standings
	Conf.				Overall
Team	W		L	PCT	W		L	PCT
VCU †	15	–	3	.833	28	–	7	.800
George Mason	15	–	3	.833	27	–	9	.750
Dayton	12	–	6	.667	23	–	11	.676
Loyola Chicago	12	–	6	.667	25	–	12	.676
Saint Louis	11	–	7	.611	19	–	15	.559
Saint Joseph's	11	–	7	.611	22	–	13	.629
George Washington	9	–	9	.500	21	–	13	.618
St. Bonaventure	9	–	9	.500	22	–	12	.647
Duquesne	8	–	10	.444	13	–	19	.406
Rhode Island	7	–	11	.389	18	–	13	.581
UMass	7	–	11	.389	12	–	20	.375
Davidson	6	–	12	.333	17	–	16	.515
Richmond	5	–	13	.278	10	–	22	.313
La Salle	5	–	13	.278	14	–	19	.424
Fordham	3	–	15	.167	12	–	21	.364
† 2025 A-10 tournament winner

The 2024–25 Davidson Wildcats men's basketball team represented Davidson College during the 2024–25 NCAA Division I men's basketball season. The Wildcats, led by third-year head coach Matt McKillop, played their home games at the John M. Belk Arena in Davidson, North Carolina as members of the Atlantic 10 Conference (A-10).

== Previous season ==
The Wildcats finished the 2023–24 season 15–17, 5–13 in A-10 play, to finish in a tie for thirteenth place. As a 13th seed, they lost in the first round to Fordham in the A-10 tournament.

== Offseason ==
=== Departures ===
Name	Number	Pos.	Height	Weight	Year	Hometown	Reason for departure
Jarvis Moss	0	G	6' 4"	200	Junior	Concord, NC	Transferred to Radford
Achile Spadone	3	G	6' 4"	195	Sophomore	Geneva, Switzerland	Walk-on; transferred to Bucknell
Grant Huffman	5	G	6' 4"	190	Senior	Aurora, OH	Graduate transferred to Vanderbilt
Angelo Brizzi	14	G	6' 3"	190	(redshirt) Sophomore	Warrenton, VA	Transferred to Longwood
Rikus Schulte	20	F	6' 9"	240	Freshman	Münster, Germany	Transferred to UC Riverside
David Skogman	42	C	6' 10"	235	(redshirt) Senior	Waukesha, WI	Graduate transferred to DePaul
Chris Sosnik	55	G	6' 2"	195	Senior	Washington, D.C.	Walk-on; graduated

=== Incoming transfers ===
Name	Num	Pos.	Height	Weight	Year	Hometown	Previous school
Joe Hurlburt	8	F	6' 11"	235	(redshirt) Sophomore	Enderlin, ND	Colorado
Zach Laput	20	G	6' 4"	200	GS Senior	Beacon Falls, CT	Bentley

=== Recruiting classes ===
==== 2024 recruiting class ====
College recruiting
Name	Hometown	School	Height	Weight	Commit date
Manie Joses; SF	Australia	NBA Global Academy	6 ft 5 in (1.96 m)	170 lb (77 kg)	Feb 16, 2024
Manie Joses; SF	Recruit ratings: Scout: Rivals: 247Sports: ESPN: (NR)				
Nick Coval; PG	Allentown, PA	Parkland High School	6 ft 1 in (1.85 m)	160 lb (73 kg)	Jun 27, 2023
Nick Coval; PG	Recruit ratings: Scout: Rivals: 247Sports: ESPN: (NR)				
Roberts Blūms; SG	Riga, Latvia	BK VEF Rīga	6 ft 4 in (1.93 m)	190 lb (86 kg)	Jun 5, 2024
Roberts Blūms; SG	Recruit ratings: Scout: Rivals: 247Sports: ESPN: (NR)				
Overall recruit ranking:
Note: In many cases, Scout, Rivals, 247Sports, On3, and ESPN may conflict in their listings of height and weight.; In these cases, the average was taken. ESPN grades are on a 100-point scale.; Sources: "2024 Team Ranking". Rivals.

==== 2025 recruiting class ====
College recruiting (2025)
Name	Hometown	School	Height	Weight	Commit date
Devin Brown; PF	Phoenix, AZ	PHHoenix Prep	6 ft 7 in (2.01 m)	200 lb (91 kg)	Aug 6, 2024
Devin Brown; PF	Recruit ratings: Scout: Rivals: 247Sports: ESPN: (NR)				
Overall recruit ranking:
Note: In many cases, Scout, Rivals, 247Sports, On3, and ESPN may conflict in their listings of height and weight.; In these cases, the average was taken. ESPN grades are on a 100-point scale.; Sources: "2025 Team Ranking". Rivals.

== Roster ==
2024–25 Davidson Wildcats men's basketball team
Players
Coaches

Pos.	#	Name	Height	Weight	Year	Previous school	Hometown
F	0	Manie Joses	6 ft 7 in (2.01 m)	190 lb (86 kg)	Fr	NBA Global Academy	London, England
G	1	Reed Bailey	6 ft 11 in (2.11 m)	220 lb (100 kg)	Jr	Brewster Academy	Harvard, MA
F	2	Bobby Durkin	6 ft 7 in (2.01 m)	215 lb (98 kg)	So	Glenbard West High School	Darien, IL
G	3	Nick Coval	6 ft 2 in (1.88 m)	175 lb (79 kg)	Fr	Parkland High School	Orefield, PA
G	4	Mike Loughnane	6 ft 4 in (1.93 m)	200 lb (91 kg)	So	Phillips Exeter Academy	Quincy, MA
F/C	8	Joe Hurlburt	6 ft 11 in (2.11 m)	235 lb (107 kg)	RS So	Colorado	Enderlin, ND
G	12	Hunter Adam	6 ft 7 in (2.01 m)	215 lb (98 kg)	RS So	Christs College of Canterbury	Christchurch, New Zealand
G	14	Phillip Kavu (W)	6 ft 2 in (1.88 m)	175 lb (79 kg)	Fr	Lake Forest Academy	Manchester, England
F	15	Sean Logan	6 ft 10 in (2.08 m)	220 lb (100 kg)	Jr	Westfield High School	Westfield, NJ
G	20	Zach Laput	6 ft 4 in (1.93 m)	205 lb (93 kg)	GS	Bentley	Beacon Falls, CT
G	22	Riccardo Ghedini	6 ft 7 in (2.01 m)	210 lb (95 kg)	RS Jr	Collegio San Carlo	Milan, Italy
G	23	Connor Kochera (C)	6 ft 5 in (1.96 m)	205 lb (93 kg)	GS	St. Viator High School; William & Mary	Arlington Heights, IL
G/F	24	Michael Katsock (W)	6 ft 6 in (1.98 m)	205 lb (93 kg)	Sr	St. Albans School	Washington, D.C.
G	45	Roberts Blūms	6 ft 4 in (1.93 m)	190 lb (86 kg)	Fr	Rigas Talmãcibas Vidusskola	Riga, Latvia
G	50	Luke Zimmerman (W)	6 ft 3 in (1.91 m)	190 lb (86 kg)	Fr	Poly Prep Country Day School	New York, NY
G	51	Brock Matheny (W)	5 ft 10 in (1.78 m)	155 lb (70 kg)	Jr	Burlington Christian Academy	Davidson, NC

Head coach

- Matt McKillop (Davidson)

Assistant coach(es)

- Will Reigel (Davidson)
- Matt Matheny (Davidson)
- Joshua Heyliger (Stonehill)

Legend

- (C) Team captain
- (S) Suspended
- (I) Ineligible
- (W) Walk-on
- Injured
- Current redshirt

Roster
Last update: January 16, 2025

== Schedule and results ==
Date time, TV	Rank^{#}	Opponent^{#}	Result	Record	High points	High rebounds	High assists	Site (attendance) city, state
Non-conference regular season
November 4, 2024*; 7:00 p.m., ESPN+		William Peace	W 88–47	1–0	19 – Kochera	7 – Bailey	4 – 4 tied	John M. Belk Arena (2,222); Davidson, NC
November 8, 2024*; 7:00 p.m.		at Bowling Green	W 91–85	2–0	24 – Bailey	8 – Bailey	5 – Laput	Stroh Center (1,960); Bowling Green, OH
November 16, 2024*; 5:00 p.m., ESPN+		East Tennessee State	W 76–70	3–0	18 – Bailey	8 – Bailey	3 – Kochera	John M. Belk Arena (2,490); Davidson, NC
November 22, 2024*; 7:00 p.m., ESPN+		VMI	W 93–66	4–0	23 – Bailey	8 – 2 tied	6 – 2 tied	John M. Belk Arena (2,153); Davidson, NC
November 27, 2024*; 7:30 p.m., ESPN2		vs. No. 24 Arizona; Battle 4 Atlantis quarterfinals	L 71–104	4–1	20 – Kochera	6 – Durkin	5 – Durkin	Imperial Arena (1,737); Paradise Island, Bahamas
November 28, 2024*; 7:30 p.m., ESPN2		vs. Providence; Battle 4 Atlantis consolation 2nd round	W 69–58	5–1	22 – Kochera	11 – Bailey	4 – Bailey	Imperial Arena (760); Paradise Island, Bahamas
November 29, 2024*; 8:30 p.m., ESPN2		vs. No. 3 Gonzaga; Battle 4 Atlantis 5th-place game	L 65–90	5–2	19 – Bailey	5 – Bailey	4 – Kochera	Imperial Arena (993); Paradise Island, Bahamas
December 6, 2024*; 7:00 p.m., ESPN+		Charleston Southern	W 73–72	6–2	25 – Bailey	7 – Bailey	5 – 2 tied	John M. Belk Arena (2,339); Davidson, NC
December 10, 2024*; 7:00 p.m., ESPN+		Charlotte	W 75–71	7–2	18 – Bailey	7 – 2 tied	5 – Bailey	John M. Belk Arena (3,126); Davidson, NC
December 14, 2024*; 7:00 p.m., ESPN+		Detroit Mercy	W 86–51	8–2	19 – Durkin	10 – Logan	5 – Loughnane	John M. Belk Arena (2,203); Davidson, NC
December 18, 2024*; 7:00 p.m., ESPN+		at Temple	L 61–62	8–3	26 – Bailey	6 – 2 tied	4 – Bailey	Liacouras Center (2,472); Philadelphia, PA
December 21, 2024*; 5:00 p.m., ESPN+		Bethune–Cookman	W 76–63	9–3	23 – Durkin	10 – Durkin	5 – Bailey	John M. Belk Arena (2,192); Davidson, NC
December 28, 2024*; 2:00 p.m., ESPN+		Eastern Michigan	W 86–64	10–3	34 – Kochera	7 – Laput	4 – Loughnane	John M. Belk Arena (3,066); Davidson, NC
Atlantic 10 regular season
December 31, 2024; 2:00 p.m., ESPN+		at George Mason	L 57–69	10–4 (0–1)	20 – Bailey	9 – Durkin	4 – Kochera	EagleBank Arena (3,105); Fairfax, VA
January 4, 2025; 2:00 p.m., ESPN+		Duquesne	W 77–71	11–4 (1–1)	22 – Bailey	8 – Bailey	5 – 2 tied	John M. Belk Arena (2,378); Davidson, NC
January 11, 2025; 2:00 p.m., ESPN+		Fordham	W 74–64	12–4 (2–1)	23 – Bailey	13 – Durkin	5 – Durkin	John M. Belk Arena (3,053); Davidson, NC
January 15, 2025; 6:30 p.m., ESPN+		at La Salle	L 76–79	12–5 (2–2)	21 – Bailey	8 – Durkin	4 – Bailey	Tom Gola Arena (1,305); Philadelphia, PA
January 18, 2025; 2:00 p.m., ESPN+		at Rhode Island	L 90–92	12–6 (2–3)	30 – Bailey	9 – Bailey	11 – Bailey	Ryan Center (5,513); Kingston, RI
January 21, 2025; 7:00 p.m., ESPN+		Saint Joseph's	L 61–78	12–7 (2–4)	25 – Bailey	7 – Blums	3 – Bailey	John M. Belk Arena (2,344); Davidson, NC
January 25, 2025; 6:00 p.m., ESPN+		at Richmond	W 72–66	13–7 (3–4)	32 – Bailey	10 – Durkin	3 – 3 tied	Robins Center (6,791); Richmond, VA
February 1, 2025; 4:00 p.m., ESPN+		George Mason	L 60–64	13–8 (3–5)	17 – Durkin	8 – Durkin	5 – Loughnane	John M. Belk Arena (2,965); Davidson, NC
February 4, 2025; 7:00 p.m., ESPN+		at Dayton	L 63–69	13–9 (3–6)	19 – Bailey	8 – Kochera	8 – Bailey	UD Arena (13,407); Dayton, OH
February 8, 2025; 12:00 p.m., USA		Richmond	W 71–60	14–9 (4–6)	24 – Bailey	8 – Bailey	5 – Bailey	John M. Belk Arena (2,611); Davidson, NC
February 12, 2025; 7:00 p.m., ESPN+		at UMass	W 77–68	15–9 (5–6)	21 – Bailey	10 – Bailey	7 – Loughnane	Mullins Center (2,529); Amherst, MA
February 15, 2025; 4:00 p.m., ESPN+		George Washington	L 67–74	15–10 (5–7)	21 – Durkin	7 – Tied	4 – Tied	John M. Belk Arena (3,214); Davidson, NC
February 18, 2025; 7:00 p.m., CBSSN		Loyola Chicago	L 69–77	15–11 (5–8)	19 – Bailey	14 – Bailey	5 – Bailey	John M. Belk Arena (2,391); Davidson, NC
February 22, 2025; 2:00 p.m., ESPN+		at Fordham	W 80–69	16–11 (6–8)	20 – Durkin	13 – Durkin	5 – Durkin	Rose Hill Gymnasium (2,221); The Bronx, NY
February 25, 2025; 7:00 p.m., ESPN+		Saint Louis	L 56–57	16–12 (6–9)	22 – Kochera	8 – Durkin	5 – Bailey	John M. Belk Arena (2,180); Davidson, NC
February 28, 2025; 7:00 p.m., ESPN		at VCU	L 56–80	16–13 (6–10)	18 – Tied	6 – Laput	4 – Durkin	Siegel Center (7,637); Richmond, VA
March 5, 2025; 9:00 p.m., CBSSN		at Loyola Chicago	L 72–82	16–14 (6–11)	19 – Bailey	8 – Adam	7 – Bailey	Joseph J. Gentile Arena (3,010); Chicago, IL
March 8, 2025; 2:00 p.m., ESPN+		St. Bonaventure	L 61–64	16–15 (6–12)	25 – Kochera	8 – Bailey	4 – Durkin	John M. Belk Arena (3,704); Davidson, NC
Atlantic 10 tournament
March 12, 2025; 11:30 a.m., USA	(12)	vs. (13) Richmond; First round	W 69–65	17–15	25 – Bailey	7 – Durkin	5 – Kochera	Capital One Arena; Washington, D.C.
March 13, 2025; 2:00 p.m., USA	(12)	vs. (5) Saint Louis; Second round	L 75–83	17–16	18 – Kochera	7 – Adam	4 – Bailey	Capital One Arena (6,203); Washington, D.C.
*Non-conference game. ^{#}Rankings from AP poll. (#) Tournament seedings in parentheses. All times are in Eastern.
