= 2024–25 La Salle Explorers men's basketball team =

American college basketball season

2024–25 La Salle Explorers men's basketball
- Conference: Atlantic 10 Conference
- Record: 14–19 (5–13 A–10)
- Head coach: Fran Dunphy (3rd season)
- Assistant coaches: John Cox; Donnie Carr; Mark Hueber; Mike Doyle
- Home arena: John Glaser Arena

2024–25 Atlantic 10 men's basketball standings
	Conf.				Overall
Team	W		L	PCT	W		L	PCT
VCU †	15	–	3	.833	28	–	7	.800
George Mason	15	–	3	.833	27	–	9	.750
Dayton	12	–	6	.667	23	–	11	.676
Loyola Chicago	12	–	6	.667	25	–	12	.676
Saint Louis	11	–	7	.611	19	–	15	.559
Saint Joseph's	11	–	7	.611	22	–	13	.629
George Washington	9	–	9	.500	21	–	13	.618
St. Bonaventure	9	–	9	.500	22	–	12	.647
Duquesne	8	–	10	.444	13	–	19	.406
Rhode Island	7	–	11	.389	18	–	13	.581
UMass	7	–	11	.389	12	–	20	.375
Davidson	6	–	12	.333	17	–	16	.515
Richmond	5	–	13	.278	10	–	22	.313
La Salle	5	–	13	.278	14	–	19	.424
Fordham	3	–	15	.167	12	–	21	.364
† 2025 A-10 tournament winner

The 2024–25 La Salle Explorers men's basketball team represented La Salle University in the 2024–25 NCAA Division I men's basketball season. The Explorers, led by third-year head coach Fran Dunphy, played their home games at John Glaser Arena in Philadelphia, Pennsylvania as members of the Atlantic 10 Conference.

On February 20, 2025, head coach Fran Dunphy announced his decision to retire at the conclusion of the 2024–25 season. On March 11, La Salle named Radford head coach Darris Nichols as the school's 21st head men's basketball coach.

== Previous season ==
The Explorers finished the 2023–24 season 16–17, 6–12 in A-10 play to finish in a 3-way tie for 10th place. As the No. 10 seed in the A-10 tournament, they defeated George Washington in the first round before losing to St. Bonaventure in the second round.

== Offseason ==
=== Departures ===
Name	Number	Pos.	Height	Weight	Year	Hometown	Reason for departure
Jhamir Brickus	2	G	5'11"	205	Senior	Coatesville, PA	Graduate transferred to Villanova
Anwar Gill	3	G	6'4"	205	Senior	Washington, D.C.	Graduate transferred to Howard
Khalil Brantley	5	G	6'1"	175	Junior	Bronx, NY	Transferred to Oklahoma State
Tommy Gardler	12	G	6'1"	185	Junior	Broomall, PA	Walk-on; transferred to Chestnut Hill College
Efe Tahmaz	14	F	6'8"	210	Freshman	Istanbul, Turkey	Transferred to Eastern Florida State College
Rokas Jocius	35	F	6'10"	260	Sophomore	Kaunas, Lithuania	Transferred to UCF

=== Incoming transfers ===
Name	Num	Pos.	Height	Weight	Year	Hometown	Previous School
Jahlil White	1	G	6'7"	210	(redshirt) Senior	Whitesboro, NJ	Temple
Corey McKeithan	2	G	6'0"	175	GS Senior	Windsor, CT	Rider
Eric Acker	3	G	6'2"	160	Sophomore	East New York, NY	LIU
Demetrius Lilley	14	F	6'10"	245	Junior	Philadelphia, PA	Penn State
Mac Etienne	21	F	6'10"	235	(redshirt) Junior	New York, NY	DePaul

=== 2024 recruiting class ===
College recruiting
Name	Hometown	School	Height	Weight	Commit date
Deuce Jones #51 PG	Hamilton, NJ	Trenton Catholic Academy	6 ft 0 in (1.83 m)	175 lb (79 kg)	Nov 8, 2023
Deuce Jones #51 PG	Recruit ratings: Rivals: 247Sports: ESPN: (79)				
Overall recruit ranking:
Note: In many cases, Scout, Rivals, 247Sports, On3, and ESPN may conflict in their listings of height and weight.; In these cases, the average was taken. ESPN grades are on a 100-point scale.; Sources: "2024 Team Ranking". Rivals.

=== 2025 recruiting class ===
College recruiting (2024)
Name	Hometown	School	Height	Weight	Commit date
Jahmare Memphis; PG	Somerset, NJ	Westtown School	6 ft 0 in (1.83 m)	175 lb (79 kg)	Jul 21, 2024
Jahmare Memphis; PG	Recruit ratings: Rivals: 247Sports: ESPN: (NR)				
Overall recruit ranking:
Note: In many cases, Scout, Rivals, 247Sports, On3, and ESPN may conflict in their listings of height and weight.; In these cases, the average was taken. ESPN grades are on a 100-point scale.; Sources: "2025 Team Ranking". Rivals.

== Roster ==
2024–25 La Salle Explorers men's basketball team
Players
Coaches

Pos.	#	Name	Height	Weight	Year	Previous school	Hometown
G	0	Andrés Marrero	6 ft 3 in (1.91 m)	200 lb (91 kg)	RS Jr	Upper Room Christian School (NY)	Caracas, Venezuela
G	1	Jahlil White	6 ft 7 in (2.01 m)	210 lb (95 kg)	RS Sr	Wildwood Catholic; Temple	Whitesboro, NJ
G	2	Corey McKeithan	6 ft 0 in (1.83 m)	175 lb (79 kg)	GS	Windsor; Rider	Windsor, CT
G	3	Eric Acker	6 ft 2 in (1.88 m)	160 lb (73 kg)	So	Eagle Academy for Young Men II; LIU	East New York, NY
G	5	Jason Umosella	6 ft 1 in (1.85 m)	170 lb (77 kg)	Fr	St. Joseph's Hammonton	Hammonton, NJ
F	7	Ryan Zan	6 ft 6 in (1.98 m)	200 lb (91 kg)	RS So	Rutgers Prep	Princeton, NJ
G	10	Jorge Sanchez-Ramos	6 ft 2 in (1.88 m)	160 lb (73 kg)	RS So	Colegio Peñalar	Torrelodones, Spain
G/F	11	James Joseph (W)	6 ft 7 in (2.01 m)	220 lb (100 kg)	GS	Springfield Township; Montgomery County CC	Torrelodones, Spain
G	12	Charles Ireland (W)	6 ft 2 in (1.88 m)	165 lb (75 kg)	Sr	La Salle College	Glenside, PA
G	13	Daeshon Shepherd	6 ft 5 in (1.96 m)	200 lb (91 kg)	Sr	Archbishop Wood	Philadelphia, PA
F	14	Demetrius Lilley	6 ft 10 in (2.08 m)	245 lb (111 kg)	Jr	Lower Merion; Penn State	Philadelphia, PA
F	21	Mac Etienne	6 ft 10 in (2.08 m)	235 lb (107 kg)	RS Jr	Suffield Academy; DePaul	New York, NY
G	24	Deuce Jones	6 ft 2 in (1.88 m)	155 lb (70 kg)	Fr	College Achieve Charter	Trenton, NJ
G/F	25	Lucas Mercandino	6 ft 6 in (1.98 m)	170 lb (77 kg)	Jr	IPEM 21 Alfonsina Storni	Córdoba, Argentina
F	31	Milos Kovacevic	6 ft 9 in (2.06 m)	235 lb (107 kg)	Sr	Sagemont (FL); Highland CC	Princeton, NJ
G/F	34	Tunde Vahlberg Fasasi	6 ft 8 in (2.03 m)	210 lb (95 kg)	So	Hoosac School (NY)	Stockholm, Sweden

Head coach

- Fran Dunphy (La Salle)

Assistant coach(es)

- John Cox (San Francisco)
- Donnie Carr (La Salle)
- Mark Hueber (Immaculata)
- Mike Doyle (Cabrini)

Legend

- (C) Team captain
- (S) Suspended
- (I) Ineligible
- (W) Walk-on
- Injured
- Current redshirt

Roster

== Schedule and results ==
Date time, TV	Rank^{#}	Opponent^{#}	Result	Record	High points	High rebounds	High assists	Site (attendance) city, state
Non-conference regular season
November 4, 2024*; 7:00 p.m., ESPN+		American	W 65–52	1–0	16 – McKeithan	8 – Etienne	3 – McKeithan	John Glaser Arena (2,385); Philadelphia, PA
November 9, 2024*; 3:30 p.m., ESPN+		Lafayette	W 81–60	2–0	18 – Marrero	13 – Tied	5 – McKeithan	John Glaser Arena (3,001); Philadelphia, PA
November 12, 2024*; 6:30 p.m., ESPN+		Cornell	W 93–77	3–0	25 – McKeithan	8 – Jones	4 – Jones	John Glaser Arena; Philadelphia, PA
November 16, 2024*; 2:00 p.m., FloSports		at Drexel; Big 5 Classic Pod 1 On-Campus	W 71–68	4–0	19 – White	11 – Lilley	6 – McKeithan	Daskalakis Athletic Center (1,948); Philadelphia, PA
November 21, 2024*; 1:30 p.m., BallerTV		vs. UC San Diego; Boardwalk Battle Quarterfinal	L 67–72	4–1	21 – McKeithan	12 – Lilley	3 – Vahlberg Fasasi	Ocean Center; Daytona Beach, FL
November 22, 2024*; 11:00 a.m., BallerTV		vs. UIC; Boardwalk Battle Consolation Semifinal	L 83–96	4–2	21 – Jones	4 – Tied	4 – Jones	Ocean Center; Daytona Beach, FL
November 23, 2024*; 11:00 a.m., BallerTV		vs. Stetson; Boardwalk Battle Seventth Place	W 92–77	5–2	27 – McKeithan	9 – Etienne	5 – White	Ocean Center; Daytona Beach, FL
November 30, 2024*; 4:00 p.m., ESPN+		Temple; Big 5 Classic Pod 1 On-Campus	W 83–75	6–2	28 – McKeithan	12 – White	6 – Marrero	John Glaser Arena (3,001); Philadelphia, PA
December 3, 2024*; 7:00 p.m., FloSports		at Northeastern	L 68–82	6–3	21 – McKeithan	9 – Lilley	3 – Tied	Matthews Arena (687); Boston, MA
December 7, 2024*; 7:00 p.m., NBCSPHI		vs. Saint Joseph's; Big 5 Classic Championship	L 68–82	6–4	19 – Jones	8 – Etienne	4 – Jones	Wells Fargo Center (14,108); Philadelphia, PA
December 14, 2024*; 4:00 p.m., The CW		at North Carolina	L 67–93	6–5	16 – Lilley	6 – Lilley	3 – Tied	Dean Smith Center (18,420); Chapel Hill, NC
December 18, 2024*; 6:30 p.m., ESPN+		Fairleigh Dickinson	W 77–72	7–5	24 – Shepherd	9 – Jones	3 – White	John Glaser Arena (978); Philadelphia, PA
December 21, 2024*; 2:00 p.m., ESPN+		Immaculata	W 108–48	8–5	21 – Vahlberg Fasasi	8 – Tied	8 – Acker	John Glaser Arena (682); Philadelphia, PA
Atlantic 10 regular season
December 31, 2024; 2:00 p.m., ESPN+		at Dayton	L 70–84	8–6 (0–1)	19 – McKeithan	9 – White	4 – Tied	UD Arena (13,407); Dayton, OH
January 8, 2025; 6:30 p.m., ESPN+		Loyola Chicago	L 68–79	8–7 (0–2)	24 – McKeithan	11 – Lilley	4 – Acker	John Glaser Arena (1,082); Philadelphia, PA
January 11, 2025; 12:00 p.m., ESPN+		at St. Bonaventure	W 83–82 ^{OT}	9–7 (1–2)	16 – Tied	8 – Tied	3 – Tied	Reilly Center (3,988); St. Bonaventure, NY
January 15, 2025; 6:30 p.m., ESPN+		Davidson	W 79–76	10–7 (2–2)	23 – Jones	14 – Etienne	5 – Jones	John Glaser Arena (1,305); Philadelphia, PA
January 19, 2025; 2:00 p.m., USA		at UMass	L 60–82	10–8 (2–3)	17 – Jones	8 – Shepherd	6 – McKeithan	Mullins Center (3,515); Amherst, MA
January 22, 2025; 8:00 p.m., ESPN+		at Saint Louis	L 52–64	10–9 (2–4)	10 – Jones	8 – White	3 – Jones	Chaifetz Arena (5,547); St. Louis, MO
January 25, 2025; 2:00 p.m., ESPN+		Rhode Island	W 70–64	11–9 (3–4)	20 – McKeithan	10 – Shepherd	3 – Jones	John Glaser Arena (1,780); Philadelphia, PA
January 29, 2025; 7:00 p.m., Peacock		Fordham	L 72–88	11–10 (3–5)	24 – Jones	9 – White	3 – Tied	John Glaser Arena (1,435); Philadelphia, PA
February 1, 2025; 2:30 p.m., USA		George Washington	W 73–67	12–10 (4–5)	19 – Tied	8 – Etienne	6 – Jones	John Glaser Arena (2,005); Philadelphia, PA
February 4, 2025; 7:00 p.m., CBSSN		at VCU	L 66–96	12–11 (4–6)	11 – Vahlberg Fasasi	7 – Etienne	3 – Tied	Siegel Center (7,132); Richmond, VA
February 9, 2025; 2:30 p.m., USA		UMass	L 55–78	12–12 (4–7)	17 – McKeithan	7 – Shepherd	2 – Tied	John Glaser Arena (1,405); Philadelphia, PA
February 12, 2025; 7:00 p.m., ESPN+		at Saint Joseph's	L 63–75	12–13 (4–8)	22 – Jones	9 – Jones	2 – Tied	Hagan Arena (2,103); Philadelphia, PA
February 15, 2025; 4:00 p.m., ESPN+		at Rhode Island	L 71–86	12–14 (4–9)	20 – Jones	11 – Jones	5 – McKeithan	Ryan Center (4,845); Kingston, RI
February 19, 2025; 6:30 p.m., ESPN+		Richmond	L 58–63	12–15 (4–10)	16 – Jones	13 – White	7 – Jones	John Glaser Arena (1,435); Philadelphia, PA
February 26, 2025; 6:30 p.m., ESPN+		Duquesne	L 62–67	12–16 (4–11)	14 – Tied	6 – White	4 – White	John Glaser Arena (1,322); Philadelphia, PA
March 1, 2025; 6:00 p.m., ESPN+		at George Washington	L 60–71	12–17 (4–12)	20 – McKeithan	8 – White	5 – Jones	Charles E. Smith Center (2,554); Washington, D.C.
March 5, 2025; 7:00 p.m., ESPN+		at George Mason	L 62–69	12–18 (4–13)	13 – White	13 – White	4 – McKeithan	EagleBank Arena (3,778); Fairfax, VA
March 8, 2025; 2:30 p.m., USA		Saint Joseph's	W 81–74	13–18 (5–13)	27 – Jones	11 – Etienne	3 – Jones	John Glaser Arena (3,000); Philadelphia, PA
Atlantic 10 tournament
March 12, 2025; 4:30 p.m., USA	(14)	vs. (11) UMass; First round	W 78–71	14–18	30 – McKeithan	9 – Etienne	5 – Jones	Capital One Arena (4,735); Washington, D.C.
March 13, 2025; 7:30 p.m., USA	(14)	vs. (6) Saint Joseph's; Second round	L 70–75	14–19	29 – McKeithan	8 – Etienne	5 – Jones	Capital One Arena (7,134); Washington, D.C.
*Non-conference game. ^{#}Rankings from AP Poll. (#) Tournament seedings in parentheses. All times are in Eastern Time.
