= 2025 Atlantic 10 men's basketball tournament =

American college basketball postseason tournament

- Classification: Division I
- Season: 2024–25
- Teams: 15
- Site: Capital One Arena; Washington, D.C.
- Champions: VCU (3rd title)
- Winning coach: Ryan Odom (1st title)
- Television: USA Network, Peacock, CBSSN, CBS/Paramount+

2024–25 Atlantic 10 men's basketball standings
| | Conf. | | | | Overall |
| Team | W | | L | PCT | W | | L | PCT |
|---|---|---|---|---|---|---|---|---|
| VCU † | 15 | – | 3 | .833 | 28 | – | 7 | .800 |
| George Mason | 15 | – | 3 | .833 | 27 | – | 9 | .750 |
| Dayton | 12 | – | 6 | .667 | 23 | – | 11 | .676 |
| Loyola Chicago | 12 | – | 6 | .667 | 25 | – | 12 | .676 |
| Saint Louis | 11 | – | 7 | .611 | 19 | – | 15 | .559 |
| Saint Joseph's | 11 | – | 7 | .611 | 22 | – | 13 | .629 |
| George Washington | 9 | – | 9 | .500 | 21 | – | 13 | .618 |
| St. Bonaventure | 9 | – | 9 | .500 | 22 | – | 12 | .647 |
| Duquesne | 8 | – | 10 | .444 | 13 | – | 19 | .406 |
| Rhode Island | 7 | – | 11 | .389 | 18 | – | 13 | .581 |
| UMass | 7 | – | 11 | .389 | 12 | – | 20 | .375 |
| Davidson | 6 | – | 12 | .333 | 17 | – | 16 | .515 |
| Richmond | 5 | – | 13 | .278 | 10 | – | 22 | .313 |
| La Salle | 5 | – | 13 | .278 | 14 | – | 19 | .424 |
| Fordham | 3 | – | 15 | .167 | 12 | – | 21 | .364 |
† 2025 A-10 tournament winner

The 2025 Atlantic 10 men's basketball tournament was the postseason men's basketball tournament for the 2024–25 season of the Atlantic 10 Conference (A-10). It was held from March 12–16, 2025, in Washington, D.C., at the Capital One Arena. It was the 49th annual edition of the tournament.

== Seeds ==
All 15 A-10 schools participated in the tournament. Teams were seeded by winning percentage within the conference, with a tiebreaker system to seed teams with identical percentages. The top nine teams received a first-round bye, and the top four teams received a double-bye, automatically advancing them to the quarterfinals.

| Seed | School | Conference Record | Tiebreaker |
|---|---|---|---|
| 1 | VCU | 15–3 | 1–0 vs. George Mason |
| 2 | George Mason | 15–3 | 0–1 vs. VCU |
| 3 | Dayton | 12–6 | 1–2 vs. VCU/George Mason |
| 4 | Loyola Chicago | 12–6 | 0–2 vs. VCU/George Mason |
| 5 | Saint Louis | 11–7 | 1–2 vs. VCU/George Mason |
| 6 | Saint Joseph's | 11–7 | 0–2 vs. VCU/George Mason |
| 7 | George Washington | 9–9 | 1–0 vs. St. Bonaventure |
| 8 | St. Bonaventure | 9–9 | 0–1 vs. George Washington |
| 9 | Duquesne | 8–10 | |
| 10 | Rhode Island | 7–11 | 1–2 vs. VCU/George Mason |
| 11 | UMass | 7–11 | 0–2 vs. VCU/George Mason |
| 12 | Davidson | 6–12 | |
| 13 | Richmond | 5–13 | 1–0 vs. La Salle |
| 14 | La Salle | 5–13 | 0–1 vs. Richmond |
| 15 | Fordham | 3–15 | |

== Schedule ==
| Session | Game | Time | Matchup | Score | Television | Attendance |
First round – Wednesday, March 12
| 1 | 1 | 11:30 a.m. | No. 12 Davidson vs. No. 13 Richmond | 69–65 | USA Network | 4,735 |
| 1 | 2 | 2:00 p.m. | No. 10 Rhode Island vs. No. 15 Fordham | 71–88 | USA Network | 4,735 |
| 1 | 3 | 4:30 p.m. | No. 11 UMass vs. No. 14 La Salle | 71–78 | USA Network | 4,735 |
Second round – Thursday, March 13
| 2 | 4 | 11:30 a.m. | No. 8 St. Bonaventure vs. No. 9 Duquesne | 64–59 | USA Network | 6,203 |
| 2 | 5 | 2:00 p.m. | No. 5 Saint Louis vs. No. 12 Davidson | 83–75 | USA Network | 6,203 |
| 3 | 6 | 5:00 p.m. | No. 7 George Washington vs. No. 15 Fordham | 88–81 | USA Network | 7,134 |
| 3 | 7 | 7:30 p.m. | No. 6 Saint Joseph's vs. No. 14 La Salle | 75–70 | USA Network | 7,134 |
Quarterfinals – Friday, March 14
| 4 | 8 | 11:30 a.m. | No. 1 VCU vs. No. 8 St. Bonaventure | 76–59 | USA Network | 8,153 |
| 4 | 9 | 2:00 p.m. | No. 4 Loyola Chicago vs. No. 5 Saint Louis | 72–64 | USA Network | 8,153 |
| 5 | 10 | 5:00 p.m. | No. 2 George Mason vs. No. 7 George Washington | 80–65 | USA Network | 8,766 |
| 5 | 11 | 7:30 p.m. | No. 3 Dayton vs. No. 6 Saint Joseph's | 68–73^{OT} | Peacock | 8,766 |
Semifinals – Saturday, March 15
| 6 | 12 | 1:00 p.m. | No. 1 VCU vs. No. 4 Loyola Chicago | 62–55 | CBSSN | 9,355 |
| 6 | 13 | 3:30 p.m. | No. 2 George Mason vs. No. 6 Saint Joseph's | 74–64 | CBSSN | 9,355 |
Championship – Sunday, March 16
| 7 | 14 | 1:00 p.m. | No. 1 VCU vs. No. 2 George Mason | 68-63 | CBS | 12,516 |
Game times in EDT. Rankings denote tournament seed.

== Bracket ==
First round Wednesday, March 12; USA Network
12 | Davidson | 69
13 | Richmond | 65
10 | Rhode Island | 71
15 | Fordham | 88
11 | UMass | 71
14 | La Salle | 78

Second round Thursday, March 13; USA Network
8 | St. Bonaventure | 64
9 | Duquesne | 59
5 | Saint Louis | 83
12 | Davidson | 75
7 | George Washington | 88
15 | Fordham | 81
6 | Saint Joseph's | 75
14 | La Salle | 70

Quarterfinals; Friday, March 14; USA Network/Peacock
1 | VCU | 76
8 | St. Bonaventure | 59
4 | Loyola Chicago | 72
5 | Saint Louis | 64
2 | George Mason | 80
7 | George Washington | 65
3 | Dayton | 68
6 | Saint Joseph's | 73^{OT}

Semifinals; Saturday, March 15; CBSSN
1 | VCU | 62
4 | Loyola Chicago | 55
2 | George Mason | 74
6 | Saint Joseph's | 64

Championship; Sunday, March 16; CBS
1 | VCU | 68
2 | George Mason | 63
