= 2024–25 St. Bonaventure Bonnies men's basketball team =

American college basketball season

2024–25 St. Bonaventure Bonnies men's basketball
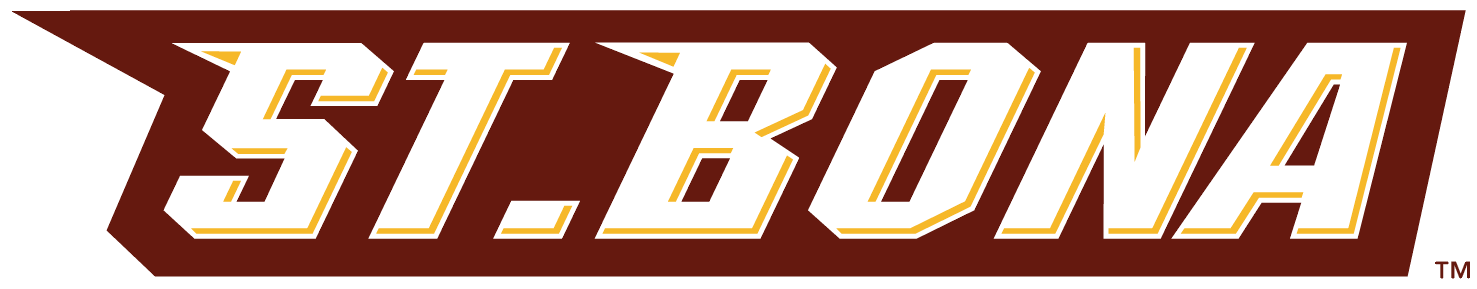

NIT, First Round
- Conference: Atlantic 10 Conference
- Record: 22–12 (9–9 A–10)
- Head coach: Mark Schmidt (18th season)
- Associate head coach: Sean Neal
- Assistant coaches: Chris Lowe; Dana Valentine
- Captains: Noel Brown; Melvin Council Jr.
- Home arena: Reilly Center

2024–25 Atlantic 10 men's basketball standings
	Conf.				Overall
Team	W		L	PCT	W		L	PCT
VCU †	15	–	3	.833	28	–	7	.800
George Mason	15	–	3	.833	27	–	9	.750
Dayton	12	–	6	.667	23	–	11	.676
Loyola Chicago	12	–	6	.667	25	–	12	.676
Saint Louis	11	–	7	.611	19	–	15	.559
Saint Joseph's	11	–	7	.611	22	–	13	.629
George Washington	9	–	9	.500	21	–	13	.618
St. Bonaventure	9	–	9	.500	22	–	12	.647
Duquesne	8	–	10	.444	13	–	19	.406
Rhode Island	7	–	11	.389	18	–	13	.581
UMass	7	–	11	.389	12	–	20	.375
Davidson	6	–	12	.333	17	–	16	.515
Richmond	5	–	13	.278	10	–	22	.313
La Salle	5	–	13	.278	14	–	19	.424
Fordham	3	–	15	.167	12	–	21	.364
† 2025 A-10 tournament winner

The 2024–25 St. Bonaventure Bonnies men's basketball team represented St. Bonaventure University during the 2024–25 NCAA Division I men's basketball season. The Bonnies, led by 18th-year head coach Mark Schmidt, played their home games at the Reilly Center in St. Bonaventure, New York as members of the Atlantic 10 Conference.

== Previous season ==
The Bonnies finished the 2023–24 season 20–13, 9–9 in A-10 Play to finish in a 3-way tie for seventh place. As a 7th seed in the A–10 Tournament they defeated Davidson and Loyola Chicago in the second round and quarterfinals before losing to Duquesne in the semifinals.

== Offseason ==
=== Departures ===
Name	Number	Pos.	Height	Weight	Year	Hometown	Reason for departure
Barry Evans	0	F	6'8"	215	Sophomore	Baltimore, MD	Transferred to Bryant
Kyrell Luc	1	G	5'11"	165	Junior	Dorchester, MA	Transferred to Longwood
Yann Farell	2	F	6'6"	210	Sophomore	Libreville, Gabon	Transferred to East Carolina
Mika Adams-Woods	3	G	6'3"	180	GS Senior	Syracuse, NY	Graduated
Moses Flowers	4	G	6'3"	185	(redshirt) Senior	Dorchester, MA	Graduated
Daryl Banks III	5	G	6'3"	175	(redshirt) Senior	Los Angeles, CA	Graduated
Charles Pride	7	G	6'4"	200	GS Senior	Syracuse, NY	Graduated
Melian Martinez	21	F/C	6'10"	225	(redshirt) Freshman	Santo Domingo, DR	Transferred to New Mexico JC
Anthony Belardinelli	23	G	6'3"	185	Senior	Upper Saddle River, NJ	Walk-on; Graduated
Chad Venning	32	F	6'10"	255	(redshirt) Junior	Brooklyn, NY	Transferred to Boston College

=== Incoming transfers ===
Name	Number	Pos.	Height	Weight	Year	Hometown	Previous School
Chance Moore	0	G	6'6"	205	Senior	Brookhaven, GA	Missouri State
Jaxon Edwards	2	G	6'5"	195	Junior	Indianapolis, IN	Valparaiso
Dasonte Bowen	5	G	6'2"	174	Junior	Boston, MA	Iowa
Michael Folarin	7	F	6'11"	230	(redshirt) Junior	London, England	Salt Lake CC
Jonah Hinton	8	G	6'3"		(redshirt) Sophomore	Chicago, IL	Panola College
Lajae Jones	10	G	6'7"	205	Junior	Jacksonville, FL	Barton College
Melvin Council Jr.	11	G	6'4"	185	Senior	Rochester, NY	Wagner

=== Recruiting classes ===
==== 2024 recruiting class ====
College recruiting information
Name	Hometown	School	Height	Weight	Commit date
Ebrahim Kaba; SF	East Orange, NJ	The Peddie School	6 ft 9 in (2.06 m)	200 lb (91 kg)	Jun 23, 2023
Ebrahim Kaba; SF	Recruit ratings: No ratings found				
Xander Wedlow; C	Detroit, MI	University Prep Academy	6 ft 9 in (2.06 m)	225 lb (102 kg)	Jun 13, 2024
Xander Wedlow; C	Recruit ratings: Rivals:				
Overall recruit ranking:
Note: In many cases, Scout, Rivals, 247Sports, On3, and ESPN may conflict in their listings of height and weight.; In these cases, the average was taken. ESPN grades are on a 100-point scale.; Sources: "2024 Team Ranking". Rivals.

== Roster ==
2024–25 St. Bonaventure Bonnies men's basketball team
Players
Coaches

Pos.	#	Name	Height	Weight	Year	Previous school	Hometown
G	0	Chance Moore	6 ft 6 in (1.98 m)	210 lb (95 kg)	Sr	Missouri State	Brookhaven, Georgia
F	1	Duane Thompson	6 ft 8 in (2.03 m)	210 lb (95 kg)	RS Fr	Putnam Science Academy	Boston, Massachusetts
G	2	Jaxon Edwards	6 ft 5 in (1.96 m)	195 lb (88 kg)	Jr	Murray State	Indianapolis, Indiana
G	3	Miles Rose	6 ft 4 in (1.93 m)	195 lb (88 kg)	So	Putnam Science Academy	Rochester, New York
G/F	4	Ebrahim Kaba	6 ft 9 in (2.06 m)	200 lb (91 kg)	Fr	Peddie School	East Orange, New Jersey
G	5	Dasonte Bowen	6 ft 2 in (1.88 m)	175 lb (79 kg)	Jr	Iowa	Boston, Massachusetts
C	7	Michael Folarin	6 ft 11 in (2.11 m)	225 lb (102 kg)	RS Jr	Salt Lake CC	London, England
G	8	Jonah Hinton	6 ft 3 in (1.91 m)	185 lb (84 kg)	RS So	Panola College	Chicago, Illinois
G	10	Lajae Jones	6 ft 7 in (2.01 m)	220 lb (100 kg)	Jr	Barton College	Jacksonville, Florida
G	11	Melvin Council Jr.	6 ft 4 in (1.93 m)	180 lb (82 kg)	Sr	Wagner	Rochester, New York
G	15	Jack DeRose (W)	6 ft 0 in (1.83 m)	175 lb (79 kg)	So	Olean High School	Olean, New York
F/C	21	Xander Wedlow	6 ft 10 in (2.08 m)	230 lb (104 kg)	Fr	University Preparatory Academy	Detroit, Michigan
C	24	Noel Brown	6 ft 11 in (2.11 m)	255 lb (116 kg)	RS Sr	George Washington	Leesburg, Virginia
G	30	Broek Ostrom (W)	6 ft 2 in (1.88 m)	180 lb (82 kg)	Jr	Holley Jr. Sr. High School	Holley, New York

Head coach

- Mark Schmidt (Boston College)

Assistant coach(es)

- Sean Neal (La Salle)
- Chris Lowe (UMass)
- Dana Valentine (Worcester State)

Legend

- (C) Team captain
- (S) Suspended
- (I) Ineligible
- (W) Walk-on
- Injured
- Current redshirt

Roster

== Schedule and results ==
Date time, TV	Rank^{#}	Opponent^{#}	Result	Record	High points	High rebounds	High assists	Site (attendance) city, state
Exhibition
October 30, 2024*; 7:00 p.m., ESPN+		Alfred	W 63–39	–	10 – Council Jr.	8 – Jones	5 – Bowen	Reilly Center (2,113); St. Bonaventure, NY
Non-conference regular season
November 4, 2024*; 7:00 p.m., ESPN+		Cal State Northridge	W 70–56	1–0	18 – Moore	9 – Moore	3 – Tied	Reilly Center (3,859); St. Bonaventure, NY
November 9, 2024*; 4:00 p.m., ESPN+		at Canisius	W 87–78	2–0	27 – Moore	6 – Tied	4 – Tied	Koessler Athletic Center (1,904); Buffalo, NY
November 13, 2024*; 7:00 p.m., ESPN+		at Florida Gulf Coast	W 74–65	3–0	18 – Moore	8 – Moore	6 – Council Jr.	Alico Arena (3,554); Fort Myers, FL
November 16, 2024*; 4:00 p.m., YES/ESPN+		Le Moyne	W 71–52	4–0	15 – Brown	8 – Tied	3 – Tied	Reilly Center (4,239); St. Bonaventure, NY
November 20, 2024*; 7:00 p.m., ESPN+		Mansfield	W 76–54	5–0	16 – Moore	12 – Moore	8 – Bowen	Reilly Center (3,356); St. Bonaventure, NY
November 24, 2024*; 2:00 p.m., ESPN+		Bryant	W 85–70	6–0	22 – Brown	7 – Brown	3 – Bowen	Reilly Center (3,919); St. Bonaventure, NY
November 28, 2024*; 5:30 p.m., ESPN2		vs. Utah State; NIT Season Tip-Off semifinals	L 67–72	6–1	15 – Tied	12 – Council Jr.	4 – Bowen	State Farm Field House; Bay Lake, FL
November 29, 2024*; 9:00 p.m., ESPNU		vs. Northern Iowa; NIT Season Tip-Off 3rd place game	W 68–56	7–1	17 – Bowen	5 – Moore	3 – Bowen	State Farm Field House (1,154); Bay Lake, FL
December 4, 2024*; 7:00 p.m., ESPN+		at Bucknell	W 64–47	8–1	17 – Moore	6 – Tied	4 – Tied	Sojka Pavilion (934); Lewisburg, PA
December 7, 2024*; 4:00 p.m., ESPN+		Buffalo	W 65–55	9–1	16 – Moore	8 – Jones	6 – Bowen	Reilly Center (3,955); St. Bonaventure, NY
December 14, 2024*; 5:00 p.m., CBSSN		vs. Providence; Basketball Hall of Fame Classic	W 74–70	10–1	24 – Council Jr.	12 – Moore	4 – Hinton	Mohegan Sun Arena (6,307); Uncasville, CT
December 17, 2024*; 7:00 p.m., ESPN+		at Siena; Franciscan Cup	W 65–48	11–1	23 – Moore	10 – Moore	4 – Council Jr.	MVP Arena (5,101); Albany, NY
December 21, 2024*; 1:00 p.m., ESPN+		Niagara	W 71–52	12–1	16 – Tied	8 – Tied	7 – Council Jr.	Reilly Center (3,795); St. Bonaventure, NY
A-10 regular season
December 31, 2024; 2:00 p.m., ESPN+		VCU	W 77–75	13–1 (1–0)	20 – Tied	12 – Moore	4 – Council Jr.	Reilly Center (4,190); St. Bonaventure, NY
January 4, 2025; 2:00 p.m., ESPN+		at Fordham	W 86–66	14–1 (2–0)	24 – Council Jr.	10 – Jones	8 – Council Jr.	Rose Hill Gymnasium (2,850); Bronx, NY
January 8, 2025; 8:00 p.m., Peacock		at Saint Louis	L 68–73	14–2 (2–1)	23 – Moore	10 – Moore	6 – Council Jr.	Chaifetz Arena (5,277); St. Louis, MO
January 11, 2025; 12:00 p.m., YES/ESPN+		La Salle	L 82–83 ^{OT}	14–3 (2–2)	24 – Jones	8 – Tied	4 – Moore	Reilly Center (3,988); St. Bonaventure, NY
January 15, 2025; 7:00 p.m., YES/ESPN+		Richmond	W 63–49	15–3 (3–2)	19 – Hinton	9 – Moore	5 – Council Jr.	Reilly Center (3,596); St. Bonaventure, NY
January 18, 2025; 2:00 p.m., ESPN+		at Duquesne	L 57–75	15–4 (3–3)	19 – Brown	10 – Brown	4 – Council Jr.	UPMC Cooper Fieldhouse (3,104); Pittsburgh, PA
January 21, 2025; 7:00 p.m., ESPN+		George Mason	L 62–75	15–5 (3–4)	18 – Council Jr.	7 – Thompson	4 – Council Jr.	Reilly Center (3,729); St. Bonaventure, NY
January 24, 2025; 9:00 p.m., ESPNU		at VCU	L 61–75	15–6 (3–5)	21 – Moore	10 – Brown	2 – Tied	Siegel Center (7,637); Richmond, VA
January 28, 2025; 8:00 p.m., YES/ESPN+		Dayton	W 75–53	16–6 (4–5)	23 – Jones	9 – Brown	7 – Council	Reilly Center (3,929); St. Bonaventure, NY
February 1, 2025; 7:00 p.m., USA		Fordham	W 74–72	17–6 (5–5)	22 – Brown	8 – Brown	7 – Council Jr.	Reilly Center (4,850); St. Bonaventure, NY
February 4, 2025; 9:00 p.m., CBSSN		at Loyola Chicago	L 53–77	17–7 (5–6)	13 – Council Jr.	3 – Tied	2 – Hinton	Joseph J. Gentile Arena (2,553); Chicago, IL
February 9, 2025; 12:00 p.m., USA		George Washington	L 52–62	17–8 (5–7)	15 – Brown	8 – Brown	6 – Council Jr.	Reilly Center (3,846); St. Bonaventure, NY
February 12, 2025; 7:00 p.m., ESPN+		at Rhode Island	L 64–68	17–9 (5–8)	18 – Hinton	8 – Bolanga	5 – Council Jr.	Ryan Center (4,704); Kingston, RI
February 15, 2025; 12:00 p.m., ESPN+		at UMass	W 73–59	18–9 (6–8)	15 – Moore	10 – Moore	4 – Council Jr.	Mullins Center (3,692); Amherst, MA
February 22, 2025; 4:00 p.m., ESPN+		Duquesne	W 70–63	19–9 (7–8)	24 – Jones	6 – Bolanga	5 – Brown	Reilly Center (4,850); St. Bonaventure, NY
February 26, 2025; 7:00 p.m., Peacock		at Saint Joseph's	L 64–75	19–10 (7–9)	18 – Council Jr.	8 – Tied	4 – Council Jr.	Hagan Arena (2,543); Philadelphia, PA
March 5, 2025; 7:00 p.m., ESPN+		UMass	W 73–72	20–10 (8–9)	15 – Jones	6 – Tied	5 – Council Jr.	Reilly Center (3,457); St. Bonaventure, NY
March 8, 2025; 2:00 p.m., ESPN+		at Davidson	W 64–61	21–10 (9–9)	16 – Brown	12 – Jones	4 – Council Jr.	John M. Belk Arena (3,704); Davidson, NC
A-10 tournament
March 13, 2025; 11:30 a.m., USA	(8)	vs. (9) Duquesne; Second round	W 64–59	22–10	18 – Tied	8 – Tied	3 – Tied	Capital One Arena; Washington, D.C.
March 14, 2025; 11:30 a.m., USA	(8)	vs. (1) VCU; Quarterfinals	L 59–76	22–11	19 – Tied	10 – Jones	4 – Council Jr.	Capital One Arena; Washington, D.C.
NIT
March 18, 2025*; 7:00 p.m., ESPNU	(3)	Kent State; First round	L 56–75	22–12	16 – Moore	7 – Jones	4 – Council Jr.	Reilly Center (3,024); St. Bonaventure, NY
*Non-conference game. ^{#}Rankings from AP Poll. (#) Tournament seedings in parentheses. All times are in Eastern Time.
