= 2024–25 UMass Minutemen basketball team =

American college basketball season

2024–25 UMass Minutemen basketball
- Conference: Atlantic 10 Conference
- Record: 12–20 (7–11 A–10)
- Head coach: Frank Martin (3rd season)
- Associate head coach: Allen Edwards
- Assistant coaches: Brian Steele; Matt Figger
- Home arena: Mullins Center

2024–25 Atlantic 10 men's basketball standings
	Conf.				Overall
Team	W		L	PCT	W		L	PCT
VCU †	15	–	3	.833	28	–	7	.800
George Mason	15	–	3	.833	27	–	9	.750
Dayton	12	–	6	.667	23	–	11	.676
Loyola Chicago	12	–	6	.667	25	–	12	.676
Saint Louis	11	–	7	.611	19	–	15	.559
Saint Joseph's	11	–	7	.611	22	–	13	.629
George Washington	9	–	9	.500	21	–	13	.618
St. Bonaventure	9	–	9	.500	22	–	12	.647
Duquesne	8	–	10	.444	13	–	19	.406
Rhode Island	7	–	11	.389	18	–	13	.581
UMass	7	–	11	.389	12	–	20	.375
Davidson	6	–	12	.333	17	–	16	.515
Richmond	5	–	13	.278	10	–	22	.313
La Salle	5	–	13	.278	14	–	19	.424
Fordham	3	–	15	.167	12	–	21	.364
† 2025 A-10 tournament winner

The 2024–25 UMass Minutemen basketball team represented the University of Massachusetts Amherst during the 2024–25 NCAA Division I men's basketball season. The Minutemen, led by third-year head coach Frank Martin, played their home games at the William D. Mullins Memorial Center in Amherst, Massachusetts as members of the Atlantic 10 Conference.

== Previous season ==
The Minutemen finished the 2023–24 season 20–11, 11–7 in A-10 play to finish in a tie for fourth place. As a No. 4 seed in the A-10 tournament they lost in the quarterfinals to VCU.

== Offseason ==
=== Departures ===
Name	Number	Pos.	Height	Weight	Year	Hometown	Reason for departure
Robert Davis Jr.	4	G	6'6"	175	Freshman	Detroit, MI	Transferred to Old Dominion
Keon Thompson	5	G	6'0"	210	Sophomore	Merrillville, IN	Transferred to Stephen F. Austin
Ryan Marcus	20	G	6'3"	185	Senior	Wakefield, MA	Walk-on; graduated
Jackson Cronin	22	G	6'0"	187	Junior	Great Neck, NY	Walk-on; transferred to Yeshiva
Josh Cohen	23	F	6'10"	220	(redshirt) Senior	Lincroft, NJ	Graduate transferred to USC
Tyler Mason	24	F	6'10"	225	Freshman	Stafford, VA	Transferred to Bethune–Cookman
Matt Cross	33	F	6'7"	230	Senior	Beverly, MA	Graduate transferred to SMU
Mathok Majok	34	C	7'3"	210	Freshman	Kuajok, South Sudan	Transferred to Oral Roberts

=== Incoming transfers ===
Name	Number	Pos.	Height	Weight	Year	Hometown	Previous School
Shahid Muhammad	4	C	6'10"	205	Junior	Queens, NY	College of Southern Idaho
Daniel Rivera	5	G/F	6'6"	210	Senior	San Juan, PR	Bryant
Akil Watson	23	F	6'9"	205	Sophomore	Middletown, NY	Arizona State
Malek Abdelgowad	25	F	6'10"	220	Senior	Cairo, Egypt	Murray State

=== 2024 recruiting class ===
College recruiting information
Name	Hometown	School	Height	Weight	Commit date
Nate Guerengomba; SF	South Kent, CT	South Kent School	6 ft 4 in (1.93 m)	220 lb (100 kg)	Nov 15, 2023
Nate Guerengomba; SF	Recruit ratings: Scout: Rivals: 247Sports: ESPN: (NR)				
Lewis Walker; PF	Winston Salem, NC	Winston Salem Christian School	6 ft 6 in (1.98 m)	220 lb (100 kg)	Nov 5, 2023
Lewis Walker; PF	Recruit ratings: Scout: Rivals: 247Sports: ESPN: (NR)				
Luka Damjanac; C	Austria	Wilbraham & Monson Academy	6 ft 10 in (2.08 m)	N/A	Nov 15, 2023
Luka Damjanac; C	Recruit ratings: Scout: Rivals: 247Sports: ESPN: (NR)				
Amadou Doumbia; C	Putnam, CT	Putnam Science Academy	6 ft 11 in (2.11 m)	N/A	May 15, 2024
Amadou Doumbia; C	Recruit ratings: Scout: Rivals: 247Sports: ESPN: (NR)				
Overall recruit ranking:
Note: In many cases, Scout, Rivals, 247Sports, On3, and ESPN may conflict in their listings of height and weight.; In these cases, the average was taken. ESPN grades are on a 100-point scale.; Sources: "2024 Team Ranking". Rivals.

=== 2025 recruiting class ===
College recruiting information (2025)
Name	Hometown	School	Height	Weight	Commit date
Danny Carbuccia #44 PG	White Plains, NY	Archbishop Stepinac High School	5 ft 11 in (1.80 m)	165 lb (75 kg)	Sep 18, 2024
Danny Carbuccia #44 PG	Recruit ratings: Scout: Rivals: 247Sports: ESPN: (79)				
Overall recruit ranking:
Note: In many cases, Scout, Rivals, 247Sports, On3, and ESPN may conflict in their listings of height and weight.; In these cases, the average was taken. ESPN grades are on a 100-point scale.; Sources: "2025 Team Ranking". Rivals.

== Roster ==
2024–25 UMass Minutemen men's basketball team
Players
Coaches

Pos.	#	Name	Height	Weight	Year	Previous school	Hometown
G	0	Jaylen Curry	6 ft 0 in (1.83 m)	168 lb (76 kg)	So	Calvary Christian Academy (FL)	Charlotte, NC
F	1	Daniel Hankins-Sanford	6 ft 8 in (2.03 m)	236 lb (107 kg)	Jr	Julius L. Chambers HS; South Carolina	Charlotte, NC
G	2	Nate Guerengomba	6 ft 4 in (1.93 m)	216 lb (98 kg)	Fr	South Kent	Washington, D.C.
G	3	Marqui Worthy	6 ft 3 in (1.91 m)	216 lb (98 kg)	So	Veritas Academy (CA)	Anaheim, CA
F/C	4	Shahid Muhammad	6 ft 10 in (2.08 m)	205 lb (93 kg)	Jr	Academy of the New Church; College of Idaho	Queens, NY
F	5	Daniel Rivera	6 ft 6 in (1.98 m)	215 lb (98 kg)	Sr	Our Saviour Lutheran; Bryant	San Juan, PR
G	7	Rahsool Diggins	6 ft 2 in (1.88 m)	190 lb (86 kg)	Sr	Archbishop Wood HS; UConn	Philadelphia, PA
F	8	Lewis Walker (redshirt)	6 ft 6 in (1.98 m)	227 lb (103 kg)	Fr	Winston Salem Christian School	Winston-Salem, NC
G	9	Josh Engel (W) (redshirt)	6 ft 0 in (1.83 m)	169 lb (77 kg)	Fr	Ranney School	Manalapan, NJ
G	11	Jayden Ndjigue	6 ft 4 in (1.93 m)	206 lb (93 kg)	So	The Rivers School	Ayer, MA
F	12	Tarique Foster	6 ft 8 in (2.03 m)	185 lb (84 kg)	So	Cardinal Hayes HS	Bronx, NY
F	13	Luka Damjanac	6 ft 10 in (2.08 m)	260 lb (118 kg)	Fr	Wilbraham & Monson Academy	Bosnia & Herzegovina
F	14	Amadou Doumbia	6 ft 11 in (2.11 m)	215 lb (98 kg)	Fr	Putnam Science Academy (CT)	Bamako, Mali
F	23	Akil Watson	6 ft 9 in (2.06 m)	185 lb (84 kg)	So	Roselle Catholic HS; Arizona State	Middletown, New York
F/C	25	Malek Abdelgowad	6 ft 10 in (2.08 m)	220 lb (100 kg)	Sr	Murray State	Cairo, Egypt
F	35	John Brigham (W) (redshirt)	6 ft 9 in (2.06 m)	213 lb (97 kg)	Fr	Dexter Southfield	Franklin, MA
G	44	Rollie Castineyra (W) (redshirt)	6 ft 1 in (1.85 m)	187 lb (85 kg)	So	Phillips Exeter Academy (NH)	Marblehead, MA

Head coach

- Frank Martin (FIU)

Assistant coach(es)

- Allen Edwards (Kentucky)
- Brian Steele (South Carolina)
- Matt Figger (Eastern Kentucky)

Legend

- (C) Team captain
- (S) Suspended
- (I) Ineligible
- (W) Walk-on
- Injured
- Current redshirt

Roster

== Schedule and results ==
Date time, TV	Rank^{#}	Opponent^{#}	Result	Record	High points	High rebounds	High assists	Site (attendance) city, state
Exhibition
October 26, 2024*; 4:00 p.m.		at Providence	L 54–63	–	16 – Curry	11 – Abdelgowad	–	Amica Mutual Pavilion; Providence, RI
Non-conference regular season
November 4, 2024*; 7:00 p.m., NESN		New Hampshire	W 103–74	1–0	26 – Diggins	6 – Pissis	8 – Sunderland	Mullins Center (3,147); Amherst, MA
November 8, 2024*; 7:00 p.m., ESPN+		at West Virginia	L 69–75	1–1	19 – Diggins	11 – Hankins-Sanford	7 – Curry	WVU Coliseum (10,017); Morgantown, WV
November 13, 2024*; 6:00 p.m., MSG+		vs. Louisiana Tech; Icons of the Game	L 66–76	1–2	14 – Curry	9 – Rivera	6 – Curry	Nassau Coliseum; Uniondale, NY
November 16, 2024*; 7:00 p.m., NESN+		Hofstra	L 71–75 ^{OT}	1–3	22 – Curry	6 – Curry	6 – Curry	Mullins Center (3,155); Amherst, MA
November 23, 2024*; 5:00 p.m., ESPN+		vs. Temple; Hall of Fame Tip-Off	L 80–87	1–4	17 – Curry	10 – Hankins-Sanford	3 – Tied	Mohegan Sun Arena (5,368); Uncasville, CT
November 24, 2024*; 3:30 p.m., ESPNU		vs. Florida State; Hall of Fame Tip-Off	L 59–92	1–5	17 – Curry	13 – Hankins-Sanford	4 – Diggins	Mohegan Sun Arena; Uncasville, CT
November 27, 2024*; 4:00 p.m., NESN+		at Harvard	W 62–54	2–5	14 – Tied	11 – Ndjigue	6 – Curry	Lavietes Pavilion (1,636); Cambridge, MA
December 1, 2024*; 12:00 p.m., ESPN+		NJIT	W 80–68	3–5	16 – Rivera	11 – Rivera	8 – Diggins	Mullins Center (2,154); Amherst, MA
December 4, 2024*; 7:00 p.m., NESN+		Central Connecticut	L 69–73	3–6	19 – Rivera	10 – Rivera	4 – Ndjigue	Mullins Center (2,163); Amherst, MA
December 7, 2024*; 12:00 p.m., NESN+		UMass Lowell	L 83–96	3–7	17 – Tied	8 – Ndjigue	5 – Ndjigue	Mullins Center (2,357); Amherst, MA
December 14, 2024*; 12:00 p.m., NESN		UMass Boston	W 86–52	4–7	26 – Abdelgowad	14 – Abdelgowad	7 – Tied	Mullins Center; Amherst, MA
December 18, 2024*; 7:00 p.m., NESN		Northeastern	W 77–72	5–7	24 – Curry	11 – Abdelgowad	3 – Tied	Mullins Center (2,033); Amherst, MA
December 21, 2024*; 4:00 p.m., CBSSN		vs. Arizona State; Basketball Hall of Fame Classic	L 62–78	5–8	24 – Diggins	9 – Rivera	5 – Worthy	MassMutual Center; Springfield, MA
A-10 regular season
December 31, 2024; 2:00 p.m., ESPN+		at Saint Joseph's	L 72–81	5–9 (0–1)	33 – Diggins	9 – Rivera	6 – Curry	Hagan Arena (2,227); Philadelphia, PA
January 4, 2025; 12:00 p.m., NESN		Richmond	L 64–72	5–10 (0–2)	18 – Curry	8 – Curry	2 – Tied	Mullins Center (3,046); Amherst, MA
January 8, 2025; 7:00 p.m., Peacock		Dayton	W 76–72	6–10 (1–2)	23 – Rivera	12 – Rivera	6 – Diggins	Mullins Center (2,373); Amherst, MA
January 11, 2025; 2:00 p.m., ESPN+		at George Mason	L 70–77	6–11 (1–3)	21 – Diggins	6 – Abdelgowad	2 – Tied	EagleBank Arena (3,214); Fairfax, VA
January 15, 2025; 7:00 p.m., ESPN+		at Fordham	W 120–118 ^{3OT}	7–11 (2–3)	46 – Diggins	12 – Rivera	4 – Diggins	Rose Hill Gymnasium (1,781); Bronx, NY
January 19, 2025; 2:00 p.m., USA		La Salle	W 82–60	8–11 (3–3)	22 – Curry	13 – Ndjigue	7 – Curry	Mullins Center (3,515); Amherst, MA
January 22, 2025; 7:00 p.m., ESPN+		George Washington	W 74–61	9–11 (4–3)	19 – Tied	11 – Abdelgowad	6 – Curry	Mullins Center (2,772); Amherst, MA
January 29, 2025; 7:00 p.m., ESPN+		at Rhode Island	L 82–88	9–12 (4–4)	27 – Diggins	7 – Rivera	3 – Tied	Ryan Center (4,664); Kingston, RI
February 1, 2025; 2:00 p.m., ESPN+		at Duquesne	W 62–53	10–12 (5–4)	32 – Diggins	12 – Hankins-Sanford	4 – Curry	UPMC Cooper Fieldhouse (2,535); Pittsburgh, PA
February 4, 2025; 7:00 p.m., ESPN+		Saint Louis	L 71–73	10–13 (5–5)	16 – Curry	14 – Rivera	4 – Worthy	Mullins Center (3,745); Amherst, MA
February 9, 2025; 2:30 p.m., USA		at La Salle	W 78–55	11–13 (6–5)	34 – Diggins	12 – Hankins-Sanford	5 – Ndjigue	Tom Gola Arena (1,405); Philadelphia, PA
February 12, 2025; 7:00 p.m., NESN		Davidson	L 68–77	11–14 (6–6)	14 – Curry	7 – Abdelgowad	5 – Tied	Mullins Center (2,529); Amherst, MA
February 15, 2025; 12:00 p.m., NESN		St. Bonaventure	L 59–73	11–15 (6–7)	14 – Foster	7 – Rivera	3 – Rivera	Mullins Center (3,692); Amherst, MA
February 19, 2025; 6:00 p.m., CBSSN		at VCU	L 51–80	11–16 (6–8)	15 – Rivera	10 – Hankins-Sanford	2 – Tied	Siegel Center (7,637); Richmond, VA
February 22, 2025; 6:00 p.m., ESPN+		at George Washington	L 52–74	11–17 (6–9)	12 – Tied	11 – Hankins-Sanford	4 – Rivera	Charles E. Smith Center (2,842); Washington, D.C.
March 1, 2025; 6:00 p.m., ESPN+		Rhode Island	W 91–88	12–17 (7–9)	29 – Diggins	12 – Hankins-Sanford	8 – Curry	Mullins Center (5,024); Amherst, MA
March 5, 2025; 7:00 p.m., ESPN+		at St. Bonaventure	L 72–73	12–18 (7–10)	22 – Hankins-Sanford	11 – Hankins-Sanford	5 – Tied	Reilly Center (3,457); St. Bonaventure, NY
March 8, 2025; 12:30 p.m., USA		Loyola Chicago	L 51–74	12–19 (7–11)	22 – Hankins-Sanford	15 – Hankins-Sanford	2 – Curry	Mullins Center (3,484); Amherst, MA
A-10 tournament
March 12, 2025; 4:30 p.m., USA	(11)	vs. (14) La Salle; First round	L 71–78	12–20	22 – Rivera	12 – Rivera	4 – Ndjigue	Capital One Arena (4,735); Washington, D.C.
*Non-conference game. ^{#}Rankings from AP Poll / Coaches' Poll. (#) Tournament seedings in parentheses. All times are in Eastern.
