= 2024–25 VCU Rams men's basketball team =

American college basketball season

2024–25 VCU Rams men's basketball

A-10 regular-season & tournament champions

NCAA tournament, First Round
- Conference: Atlantic 10 Conference
- Record: 28–7 (15–3 A-10)
- Head coach: Ryan Odom (2nd season)
- Assistant coaches: Darius Theus; Bryce Crawford; Matt Henry
- Home arena: Stuart C. Siegel Center

2024–25 Atlantic 10 men's basketball standings
	Conf.				Overall
Team	W		L	PCT	W		L	PCT
VCU †	15	–	3	.833	28	–	7	.800
George Mason	15	–	3	.833	27	–	9	.750
Dayton	12	–	6	.667	23	–	11	.676
Loyola Chicago	12	–	6	.667	25	–	12	.676
Saint Louis	11	–	7	.611	19	–	15	.559
Saint Joseph's	11	–	7	.611	22	–	13	.629
George Washington	9	–	9	.500	21	–	13	.618
St. Bonaventure	9	–	9	.500	22	–	12	.647
Duquesne	8	–	10	.444	13	–	19	.406
Rhode Island	7	–	11	.389	18	–	13	.581
UMass	7	–	11	.389	12	–	20	.375
Davidson	6	–	12	.333	17	–	16	.515
Richmond	5	–	13	.278	10	–	22	.313
La Salle	5	–	13	.278	14	–	19	.424
Fordham	3	–	15	.167	12	–	21	.364
† 2025 A-10 tournament winner

The 2024–25 VCU Rams men's basketball team represented Virginia Commonwealth University during the 2024–25 NCAA Division I men's basketball season. The Rams, led by second-year head coach Ryan Odom, played their home games at the Siegel Center in Richmond, Virginia, as a member of the Atlantic 10 Conference. They finished the season 28–7, 15–3 in A-10 play to win the regular season championship. They defeated St. Bonaventure, Loyola Chicago, and George Mason to win the A-10 tournament championship. As a result, they received the conference's automatic bid to the NCAA tournament as the No. 11 seed in the East region. They lost to BYU in the first round.

On March 22, 2025, head coach Ryan Odom left the team to take the head coaching position at Virginia. On March 25, the school named Bryant head coach Phil Martelli Jr. the team's new head coach.

== Previous season ==
The 2023–24 team was the first year with Ryan Odom coaching the squad. During the season, VCU finished the season with a 24–14 record including an 11–7 record in Atlantic 10 play. The Rams lost in the Atlantic 10 championship game to Duquesne, and earned an at-large berth into the 2024 National Invitation Tournament. In the NIT, the Rams had their best performance in the tournament since 1988, reaching the quarterfinals before losing to Utah.

== Offseason ==
=== Departures ===
Name	Number	Pos.	Height	Weight	Year	Hometown	Reason for departure
Jason Nelson	1	G	5'10"	175	(redshirt) Sophomore	Richmond, VA	Transferred to Youngstown State
Roosevelt Wheeler	4	F/C	6'11"	240	Junior	Richmond, VA	Transferred to East Tennessee State
Sean Bairstow	7	G	6'8"	205	GS Senior	Brisbane, Australia	Graduated
Tobi Lawal	10	F	6'8"	200	Sophomore	London, England	Transferred to Virginia Tech
Kuany Kuany	13	F	6'9"	200	GS Senior	Melbourne, Australia	Graduated
Connor Odom	14	G	5'11"	165	Senior	Annapolis, MD	Graduated

=== Incoming transfers ===
Name	Number	Pos.	Height	Weight	Year	Hometown	Previous school
Phillip Russell	1	G	5'10"	165	Senior	St. Louis, MO	UT Arlington
Jack Clark	4	F	6'10"	207	GS Senior	Cheltenham, PA	Clemson

=== 2024 recruits ===
The following players have committed to playing for VCU.

College recruiting information
Name	Hometown	School	Height	Weight	Commit date
Luke Bamgboye #33 C	Scottsdale, AZ	AZ Compass Prep	6 ft 8 in (2.03 m)	205 lb (93 kg)	Jun 9, 2024
Luke Bamgboye #33 C	Recruit ratings: Scout: Rivals: 247Sports: ESPN: (80)				
Terrence Hill Jr. #45 PG	Portland, OR	Roosevelt High School	6 ft 3 in (1.91 m)	175 lb (79 kg)	Jul 11, 2024
Terrence Hill Jr. #45 PG	Recruit ratings: Scout: Rivals: 247Sports: ESPN: (79)				
Brandon Jennings; PG	Richmond, VA	St. Christopher's School	6 ft 3 in (1.91 m)	175 lb (79 kg)	Nov 8, 2023
Brandon Jennings; PG	Recruit ratings: Scout: Rivals: 247Sports: ESPN: (NR)				
Martin Carrère; SF	Pontonx-sur-l'Adour, France	Limoges Cercle Saint-Pierre	6 ft 8 in (2.03 m)	N/A	Jul 21, 2024
Martin Carrère; SF	Recruit ratings: Scout: Rivals: 247Sports: ESPN: (NR)				
Overall recruit ranking:
Note: In many cases, Scout, Rivals, 247Sports, On3, and ESPN may conflict in their listings of height and weight.; In these cases, the average was taken. ESPN grades are on a 100-point scale.; Sources: "VCU 2024 Player Commits". ESPN.; "2024 Team Ranking". Rivals.

==== 2025 recruiting class ====
College recruiting information (2025)
Name	Hometown	School	Height	Weight	Commit date
Silas Barksdale #33 C	Hampton, VA	Woodside High School	6 ft 8 in (2.03 m)	210 lb (95 kg)	Sep 5, 2024
Silas Barksdale #33 C	Recruit ratings: Scout: Rivals: 247Sports: ESPN: (81)				
Overall recruit ranking:
Note: In many cases, Scout, Rivals, 247Sports, On3, and ESPN may conflict in their listings of height and weight.; In these cases, the average was taken. ESPN grades are on a 100-point scale.; Sources: "VCU 2025 Player Commits". ESPN.; "2025 Team Ranking". Rivals.

== Roster ==
2024–25 VCU Rams men's basketball team
Players
Coaches

Pos.	#	Name	Height	Weight	Year	Previous school	Hometown
G	0	Brandon Jennings	6 ft 4 in (1.93 m)	175 lb (79 kg)	Fr	St. Christopher School	Richmond, VA
G	1	Phillip Russell	6 ft 0 in (1.83 m)	180 lb (82 kg)	Sr	UT Arlington	St. Louis, MO
G	2	Zeb Jackson	6 ft 5 in (1.96 m)	190 lb (86 kg)	GS	Michigan	Toledo, OH
F	4	Jack Clark	6 ft 10 in (2.08 m)	215 lb (98 kg)	GS	Clemson	Cheltenham, PA
G/F	5	Alphonzo Billups III	6 ft 7 in (2.01 m)	180 lb (82 kg)	RS So	Varina	Richmond, VA
G	6	Terrence Hill Jr.	6 ft 3 in (1.91 m)	180 lb (82 kg)	Fr	Roosevelt	Portland, OR
F	7	Obinnaya Okafor (W)	6 ft 9 in (2.06 m)	210 lb (95 kg)	RS So	Bethel	Hampton, VA
G/F	8	Michael Belle	6 ft 8 in (2.03 m)	220 lb (100 kg)	So	Strasbourg	London, England
F	9	Luke Bamgboye	6 ft 10 in (2.08 m)	200 lb (91 kg)	Fr	AZ Compass Prep	London, England
G	11	Max Shulga	6 ft 5 in (1.96 m)	197 lb (89 kg)	GS	Utah State	Kyiv, Ukraine
G/F	17	Martin Carrère	6 ft 8 in (2.03 m)	180 lb (82 kg)	Fr	Limoges	Pontonx-sur-l'Adour, France
F	21	Christian Fermin	6 ft 10 in (2.08 m)	235 lb (107 kg)	Jr	Pocono Mountain West	Tobyhanna, PA
G	22	Joe Bamisile	6 ft 4 in (1.93 m)	200 lb (91 kg)	GS	Oklahoma	Richmond, VA

Head coach

- Ryan Odom (Hampden–Sydney)

Assistant coach(es)

- Bryce Crawford (Ohio State)
- Matt Henry (Trinity (TX))
- Darius Theus (VCU)

Legend

- (C) Team captain
- (S) Suspended
- (I) Ineligible
- (W) Walk-on
- Injured
- Current redshirt

Roster

== Schedule and results ==
Date time, TV	Rank^{#}	Opponent^{#}	Result	Record	High points	High rebounds	High assists	Site (attendance) city, state
Scrimmage
October 19, 2024*		Virginia; Scrimmage	W 71–49		–	–	–	Siegel Center (0); Richmond, VA
Exhibition
October 28, 2024*; 7:00 p.m.		St. Mary's (MD)	W 102–44		26 – Bamisile	8 – Shulga	3 – Tied	Siegel Center (4,614); Richmond, VA
Non-conference regular season
November 4, 2024*; 7:00 p.m., MASN		Bellarmine	W 84–65	1–0	19 – Shulga	10 – Belle	5 – Shulga	Siegel Center (7,637); Richmond, VA
November 8, 2024*; 6:00 p.m., CBSSN		vs. Boston College; Veterans Classic	W 80–55	2–0	20 – Russell	10 – Shulga	4 – Shulga	Alumni Hall; Annapolis, MD
November 13, 2024*; 7:00 p.m., MASN		Merrimack	W 63–42	3–0	20 – Bamisile	9 – Jennings	4 – Tied	Siegel Center (7,183); Richmond, VA
November 16, 2024*; 7:00 p.m., MASN		Loyola (MD)	W 83–57	4–0	25 – Clark	10 – Shulga	7 – Shulga	Siegel Center (7,637); Richmond, VA
November 21, 2024*; 5:00 p.m., ESPN2		vs. Seton Hall; Charleston Classic quarterfinals	L 66–69 ^{OT}	4–1	20 – Shulga	5 – Tied	3 – Tied	TD Arena; Charleston, SC
November 22, 2024*; 7:30 p.m., ESPN+		vs. Nevada; Charleston Classic consolation	L 61–64	4–2	18 – Jackson	7 – Tied	4 – Tied	TD Arena (2,823); Charleston, SC
November 24, 2024*; 12:30 p.m., ESPN+		vs. Miami (FL); Charleston Classic 7th place game	W 77–70	5–2	22 – Bamisile	8 – Shulga	9 – Shulga	TD Arena; Charleston, SC
November 29, 2024*; 7:00 p.m., MASN		Elizabeth City State	W 103–58	6–2	18 – Russell	9 – Ferman	3 – Jackson	Siegel Center (7,637); Richmond, VA
December 4, 2024*; 7:00 p.m., MASN		Georgia Southern	W 89–54	7–2	29 – Shulga	6 – Tied	3 – Tied	Siegel Center (6,624); Richmond, VA
December 9, 2024*; 7:00 p.m., MASN		Penn	W 66–47	8–2	23 – Bamisile	11 – Bamisile	7 – Russell	Siegel Center (7,016); Richmond, VA
December 14, 2024*; 7:30 p.m., Baller TV		vs. Colorado State; Jack Jones Classic	W 76–68	9–2	25 – Bamisile	10 – Shulga	4 – Shulga	Lee's Family Forum; Henderson, NV
December 18, 2024*; 9:00 p.m., MW Network		at New Mexico	L 71–78	9–3	20 – Shulga	5 – Belle	2 – Tied	The Pit (11,483); Albuquerque, NM
December 22, 2024*; 2:00 p.m., MASN		William & Mary	W 90–70	10–3	20 – Bamisile	10 – Clark	6 – Tied	Siegel Center (7,637); Richmond, VA
Atlantic 10 regular season
December 31, 2025; 2:00 p.m., ESPN+		at St. Bonaventure	L 75–77	10–4 (0–1)	26 – Russell	8 – Bamisile	4 – Shulga	Reilly Center (4,190); St. Bonaventure, NY
January 4, 2025; 2:00 p.m., CBSSN		at Loyola Chicago	W 84–65	11–4 (1–1)	25 – Russell	11 – Clark	5 – Shulga	Joseph J. Gentile Arena (4,129); Chicago, IL
January 8, 2025; 7:00 p.m., MASN		Fordham	W 73–61	12–4 (2–1)	18 – Bamisile	11 – Clark	5 – Russell	Siegel Center (0 (Note: Game was played without spectators in attendance due to the January 2025 Richmond water outage.)); Richmond, VA
January 14, 2025; 7:00 p.m., MASN		Saint Louis	W 78–62	13–4 (3–1)	23 – Bamisile	6 – Jennings	9 – Shulga	Siegel Center (7,637); Richmond, VA
January 17, 2025; 7:00 p.m., ESPNU		at Saint Joseph's	W 78–69	14–4 (4–1)	18 – Clark	9 – Shulga	3 – Shulga	Hagan Arena (3,069); Philadelphia, PA
January 21, 2025; 7:00 p.m., CBSSN		at Rhode Island	W 81–57	15–4 (5–1)	24 – Bamisile	9 – Bamgboye	3 – Shulga	Ryan Center (4,517); Kingston, RI
January 24, 2025; 9:00 p.m., ESPNU		St. Bonaventure	W 75–61	16–4 (6–1)	18 – Bamisile	9 – Jackson	6 – Bamisile	Siegel Center (7,637); Richmond, VA
January 28, 2025; 8:00 p.m., CBSSN		at Saint Louis	L 69–78	16–5 (6–2)	15 – Tied	9 – Clark	3 – Clark	Chaifetz Arena (6,763); St. Louis, MO
February 1, 2025; 4:00 p.m., CBSSN		Richmond; Capital City Classic	W 90–49	17–5 (7–2)	20 – Shulga	6 – Shulga	5 – Shulga	Siegel Center (7,637); Richmond, VA
February 4, 2025; 7:00 p.m., CBSSN		La Salle	W 96–66	18–5 (8–2)	17 – Bamisile	8 – Fermin	5 – Clark	Siegel Center (7,132); Richmond, VA
February 7, 2025; 7:00 p.m., ESPN2		at Dayton	W 73–68	19–5 (9–2)	17 – Jackson	8 – Shulga	3 – Shulga	UD Arena (13,407); Dayton, OH
February 12, 2025; 7:00 p.m., Peacock		at George Washington	W 80–72	20–5 (10–2)	18 – Clark	9 – Clark	4 – Tied	Charles E. Smith Center (2,078); Washington, D.C.
February 19, 2025; 6:00 p.m., CBSSN		UMass	W 80–51	21–5 (11–2)	19 – Tied	6 – Bamisile	7 – Shulga	Siegel Center (7,637); Richmond, VA
February 22, 2025; 4:00 p.m., CBSSN		George Mason; Rivalry	W 70–54	22–5 (12–2)	22 – Shulga	9 – Clark	6 – Jackson	Siegel Center (7,637); Richmond, VA
February 25, 2025; 7:00 p.m., CBSSN		at Richmond; Capital City Classic	W 78–60	23–5 (13–2)	16 – Shulga	8 – Bamisile	4 – Shulga	Robins Center (6,420); Richmond, VA
February 28, 2025; 7:00 p.m., ESPN2		Davidson	W 80–56	24–5 (14–2)	18 – Clark	11 – Shulga	4 – Russell	Siegel Center (7,637); Richmond, VA
March 4, 2025; 7:00 p.m., CBSSN		at Duquesne	W 71–62	25–5 (15–2)	22 – Shulga	14 – Clark	3 – Clark	UPMC Cooper Fieldhouse (2,574); Pittsburgh, PA
March 7, 2025; 7:00 p.m., ESPN2		Dayton	L 76–79	25–6 (15–3)	18 – Bamisile	9 – Shulga	3 – Shulga	Siegel Center (7,637); Richmond, VA
Atlantic 10 tournament
March 14, 2025; 11:30 a.m., USA	(1)	vs. (8) St. Bonaventure; Quarterfinals	W 76–59	26–6	17 – Clark	10 – Belle	11 – Shulga	Capital One Arena (8,153); Washington, D.C.
March 15, 2025; 1:00 p.m., CBSSN	(1)	vs. (4) Loyola Chicago; Semifinals	W 62–55	27–6	14 – Shulga	10 – Shulga	4 – Shulga	Capital One Arena (9,355); Washington, D.C.
March 16, 2025; 1:00 p.m., CBS	(1)	vs. (2) George Mason; Championship/Rivalry	W 68–63	28–6	18 – Shulga	8 – Bamgboye	3 – Tied	Capital One Arena (12,516); Washington, D.C.
NCAA tournament
March 20, 2025; 4:05 p.m., TNT	(11 E)	vs. (6 E) No. 17 BYU; First round	L 71–80	28–7	23 – Jackson	10 – Clark	5 – Clark	Ball Arena (19,291); Denver, CO
*Non-conference game. ^{#}Rankings from AP poll. (#) Tournament seedings in parentheses. E=East. All times are in Eastern Time.

== Rankings ==
Ranking movements Legend: ██ Increase in ranking ██ Decrease in ranking — = Not ranked RV = Received votes
	Week																				
Poll	Pre	1	2	3	4	5	6	7	8	9	10	11	12	13	14	15	16	17	18	19	Final
AP	RV	RV	—	—	—	—	—	—	—	—	—	—	RV	—	—	—	RV	RV	RV	RV	—
Coaches	—	—	RV	—	—	—	—	—	—	—	—	—	—	—	RV	RV	RV	25	RV	RV	—
