= 2024–25 Rhode Island Rams men's basketball team =

American college basketball season

2024–25 Rhode Island Rams men's basketball

Jacksonville Classic champions
- Conference: Atlantic 10 Conference
- Record: 18–13 (7–11 A-10)
- Head coach: Archie Miller (3rd season)
- Assistant coaches: Austin Carroll; Chandler Graves; Ben Sander; James Whitford; Duane Woodward
- Home arena: Ryan Center

2024–25 Atlantic 10 men's basketball standings
	Conf.				Overall
Team	W		L	PCT	W		L	PCT
VCU †	15	–	3	.833	28	–	7	.800
George Mason	15	–	3	.833	27	–	9	.750
Dayton	12	–	6	.667	23	–	11	.676
Loyola Chicago	12	–	6	.667	25	–	12	.676
Saint Louis	11	–	7	.611	19	–	15	.559
Saint Joseph's	11	–	7	.611	22	–	13	.629
George Washington	9	–	9	.500	21	–	13	.618
St. Bonaventure	9	–	9	.500	22	–	12	.647
Duquesne	8	–	10	.444	13	–	19	.406
Rhode Island	7	–	11	.389	18	–	13	.581
UMass	7	–	11	.389	12	–	20	.375
Davidson	6	–	12	.333	17	–	16	.515
Richmond	5	–	13	.278	10	–	22	.313
La Salle	5	–	13	.278	14	–	19	.424
Fordham	3	–	15	.167	12	–	21	.364
† 2025 A-10 tournament winner

The 2024–25 Rhode Island Rams basketball team represented the University of Rhode Island during the 2024–25 NCAA Division I men's basketball season. The Rams, led by third-year head coach Archie Miller, played their home games at the Ryan Center in Kingston, Rhode Island as members of the Atlantic 10 Conference.

== Previous season ==
The Rams finished the 2023–24 season 12–20, 6–12 in A-10 play to finish in a three way for tenth place. As a No. 11 seed in the Atlantic 10 Tournament they lost in the first round to Saint Louis.

== Offseason ==
=== Departures ===
Name	Number	Pos.	Height	Weight	Year	Hometown	Reason for departure
Zek Montgomery	0	G	6'6"	215	Junior	Louisville, KY	Transferred to Bradley
Luis Kortright	1	G	6'3"	200	Junior	Manhattan, NY	Transferred to Washington
Tyson Brown	10	F	6'9"	225	Junior	Virginia Beach, VA	Transferred to Georgia Southern
Jeremy Foumena	11	C	6'11"	235	(redshirt) Freshman	Montreal, QC	Transferred to Mississippi State
Connor Dubsky	14	G	6'4"	190	Freshman	Woodbridge, VA	Transferred to UNC Asheville
Rory Stewart	15	F	6'8"	230	Sophomore	Toronto, ON	Transferred to Florida Gulf Coast
Brandon Weston	20	G/F	6'5"	200	(redshirt) Sophomore	Brooklyn, NY	Transferred to Tennessee State
Josaphat Bilau	21	F	6'10"	235	(redshirt) Junior	La Roche-sur-Yon, France	Left the team to personal reasons
Ray Allen III	34	G	6'1"	185	Freshman	Miami, FL	Walk-on; not on team roster
Jameson Smith	35	G	6'1"	185	Freshman	Falls Church, VA	Walk-on; transferred

=== Incoming transfers ===
Name	Number	Pos.	Height	Weight	Year	Hometown	Previous School
Sebastian Thomas	1	G	6'1"		Senior	Providence, RI	Albany
Quentin Diboundje	7	G	6'5"	221	Senior	Montpellier, France	East Carolina
Jamarques Lawrence	10	G	6'3"	183	Junior	Plainfield, NJ	Nebraska
Javonte Brown	31	F	7'0"	255	(redshirt) Junior	Toronto, ON	Western Michigan
Drissa Traore	55	F	6'8"	215	(redshirt) Junior	New York City, NY	St. John's

=== Recruiting classes ===
==== 2024 recruiting class ====
College recruiting information
Name	Hometown	School	Height	Weight	Commit date
Tyonne Farrell; SF	Baltimore, MD	Mount Saint Joseph College	6 ft 6 in (1.98 m)	N/A	Jun 30, 2022
Tyonne Farrell; SF	Recruit ratings: Scout: Rivals: (NR)				
Damone King; CG	Louisville, KY	Dupont Manual High School	6 ft 1 in (1.85 m)	N/A	
Damone King; CG	Recruit ratings: Scout: Rivals: 247Sports: (NR)				
Overall recruit ranking:
Note: In many cases, Scout, Rivals, 247Sports, On3, and ESPN may conflict in their listings of height and weight.; In these cases, the average was taken. ESPN grades are on a 100-point scale.; Sources: "2024 Team Ranking". Rivals.

==== 2025 recruiting class ====
College recruiting information (2025)
Name	Hometown	School	Height	Weight	Commit date
Barrett Loer; SF	Newport, RI	St George's School	6 ft 5 in (1.96 m)	180 lb (82 kg)	Aug 1, 2024
Barrett Loer; SF	Recruit ratings: Scout: Rivals: 247Sports: (NR)				
Overall recruit ranking:
Note: In many cases, Scout, Rivals, 247Sports, On3, and ESPN may conflict in their listings of height and weight.; In these cases, the average was taken. ESPN grades are on a 100-point scale.; Sources: "2025 Team Ranking". Rivals.

== Roster ==
2024–25 Rhode Island Rams men's basketball team
Players
Coaches

Pos.	#	Name	Height	Weight	Year	Previous school	Hometown
G	1	Sebastian Thomas	6 ft 1 in (1.85 m)	175 lb (79 kg)	Sr	Bishop Hendricken; Albany	Providence, RI
G	2	Jaden House	6 ft 4 in (1.93 m)	205 lb (93 kg)	Sr	Middleburg Academy; High Point	Richmond, VA
G	4	Cam Estevez	6 ft 3 in (1.91 m)	195 lb (88 kg)	So	Canterbury School	Harlem, NY
G	5	Always Wright	6 ft 3 in (1.91 m)	178 lb (81 kg)	Jr	Joplin; Northeastern Oklahoma A&M	Carthage, MO
G	7	Quentin Diboundje	6 ft 5 in (1.96 m)	221 lb (100 kg)	Sr	Montverde Academy; East Carolina	Montpellier, France
C	8	Moek Icke (W)	7 ft 1 in (2.16 m)	223 lb (101 kg)	So		Purmerend, Netherlands
G	10	Jamarques Lawrence	6 ft 3 in (1.91 m)	183 lb (83 kg)	Jr	Roselle Catholic; Nebraska	Plainfield, NJ
G	11	Damone King	6 ft 2 in (1.88 m)	175 lb (79 kg)	Fr	DeSales	Louisville, KY
G	13	Jaymien Aponte (W)	6 ft 3 in (1.91 m)	183 lb (83 kg)	Fr	Cranston West	Cranston, RI
G	14	Arsenii Kolobov (W)	6 ft 4 in (1.93 m)	195 lb (88 kg)	Fr		Altea, Spain
F	22	Tyonne Farrell	6 ft 6 in (1.98 m)	208 lb (94 kg)	Fr	Mount Saint Joseph	Baltimore, MD
F	23	David Green	6 ft 7 in (2.01 m)	230 lb (104 kg)	RS Sr	Ocoee; Louisiana Tech	Apopka, FL
F	24	David Fuchs	6 ft 9 in (2.06 m)	245 lb (111 kg)	So	Ratiopharm Ulm (Germany)	Vienna, Austria
G	30	Jimmy Ball (W)	6 ft 2 in (1.88 m)	183 lb (83 kg)	Jr	Arlington Catholic	Medford, MA
F	31	Javonte Brown	7 ft 0 in (2.13 m)	255 lb (116 kg)	RS Jr	Thornlea Secondary; Western Michigan	Toronto, ON
F	55	Drissa Traore	6 ft 8 in (2.03 m)	220 lb (100 kg)	RS Jr	Long Island Lutheran; St. John's	New York City, NY

Head coach

- Archie Miller (NC State)

Assistant coach(es)

- Austin Carroll (American)
- Chandler Graves (Indiana)
- Ben Sander (Arizona)
- James Whitford (Wisconsin)
- Duane Woodward (Boston College)

Legend

- (C) Team captain
- (S) Suspended
- (I) Ineligible
- (W) Walk-on
- Injured
- Current redshirt

Roster

== Schedule and results ==
Date time, TV	Rank^{#}	Opponent^{#}	Result	Record	High points	High rebounds	High assists	Site (attendance) city, state
Exhibition
October 14, 2024*; 6:00 p.m., NBCSB		vs. No. 3 UConn; Basketball Hall of Fame Enshrinement Game	L 75–102		16 – Brown	10 – Brown	5 – Farrell	Mohegan Sun Arena (7,953); Uncasville, CT
Non-conference regular season
November 4, 2024*; 8:00 p.m., ESPN+		Fairfield	W 96–58	1–0	18 – Thomas	7 – Farrell	7 – Thomas	Ryan Center (4,376); Kingston, RI
November 8, 2024*; 7:00 p.m., ESPN+		Holy Cross	W 91–77	2–0	25 – Green	8 – House	9 – Thomas	Ryan Center (3,530); Kingston, RI
November 12, 2024*; 7:00 p.m., ESPN+		Franklin Pierce	W 105–73	3–0	21 – House	10 – Tied	6 – Farrell	Ryan Center (3,334); Kingston, RI
November 20, 2024*; 7:00 p.m., ESPN+		Lafayette	W 86–72	4–0	23 – Thomas	14 – Green	9 – Thomas	Ryan Center (3,235); Kingston, RI
November 24, 2024*; 12:00 p.m., ESPN+		Charleston	W 91–53	5–0	17 – Brown	11 – Fuchs	10 – Thomas	Ryan Center; Kingston, RI
November 27, 2024*; 12:00 p.m.		vs. Detroit Mercy; Jacksonville Classic	W 81–75	6–0	20 – Green	8 – Green	9 – Thomas	FSCJ South Gym (161); Jacksonville, FL
November 28, 2024*; 2:00 p.m.		vs. UT Arlington; Jacksonville Classic	W 83–78	7–0	18 – Tied	6 – Traore	7 – Lawrence	FSCJ South Gym (136); Jacksonville, FL
December 2, 2024*; 7:00 p.m., ESPN+		Yale	W 84–78	8–0	26 – Green	10 – Fuchs	6 – Thomas	Ryan Center (3,547); Kingston, RI
December 7, 2024*; 12:00 p.m., CBSSN		Providence; Ocean State Rivalry	W 69–63	9–0	19 – Thomas	8 – Green	4 – Thomas	Ryan Center (7,685); Kingston, RI
December 10, 2024*; 7:00 p.m., ESPN+		at Brown	L 80–84 ^{2OT}	9–1	22 – Thomas	11 – Green	3 – Lawrence	Pizzitola Sports Center (2,253); Providence, RI
December 15, 2024*; 1:00 p.m., ESPN+		Central Connecticut	W 77–69	10–1	16 – Lawrence	12 – Fuchs	6 – Lawrence	Ryan Center (3,842); Kingston, RI
December 21, 2024*; 6:30 p.m., CBSSN		vs. Temple; Basketball Hall of Fame Classic	W 85–79	11–1	21 – Brown	10 – Brown	10 – Thomas	MassMutual Center (3,252); Springfield, MA
Atlantic 10 regular season
December 31, 2024; 2:00 p.m., ESPN+		at Duquesne	L 55–67	11–2 (0–1)	20 – Thomas	7 – Fuchs	4 – Tied	UPMC Cooper Fieldhouse (2,435); Pittsburgh, PA
January 4, 2025; 2:00 p.m., USA		George Mason	W 62–59	12–2 (1–1)	23 – Thomas	13 – Brown	3 – Thomas	Ryan Center (5,803); Kingston, RI
January 8, 2025; 7:00 p.m., ESPN+		George Washington	L 67–75	12–3 (1–2)	20 – Thomas	9 – Traore	3 – Tied	Ryan Center (4,261); Kingston, RI
January 11, 2025; 6:00 p.m., ESPN+		at Richmond	W 67–64 ^{OT}	13–3 (2–2)	23 – Thomas	12 – Brown	2 – Tied	Robins Center (5,465); Richmond, VA
January 15, 2025; 9:00 p.m., CBSSN		at Loyola Chicago	L 77–81	13–4 (2–3)	20 – Thomas	10 – Fuchs	6 – Thomas	Joseph J. Gentile Arena (2,523); Chicago, IL
January 18, 2025; 2:00 p.m., ESPN+		Davidson	W 92–90	14–4 (3–3)	22 – Tied	11 – Fuchs	10 – Thomas	Ryan Center (5,513); Kingston, RI
January 21, 2025; 7:00 p.m., CBSSN		VCU	L 57–81	14–5 (3–4)	19 – Thomas	9 – Fuchs	2 – House	Ryan Center (4,517); Kingston, RI
January 25, 2025; 2:00 p.m., ESPN+		at La Salle	L 64–70	14–6 (3–5)	16 – Tied	8 – Fuchs	4 – Thomas	Tom Gola Arena (1,780); Philadelphia, PA
January 29, 2025; 7:00 p.m., ESPN+		UMass	W 88–82	15–6 (4–5)	22 – Thomas	8 – Thomas	7 – Thomas	Ryan Center (4,664); Kingston, RI
February 5, 2025; 7:00 p.m., ESPN+		at Fordham	L 79–80	15–7 (4–6)	20 – Thomas	8 – Fuchs	5 – Thomas	Rose Hill Gymnasium (1,309); Bronx, NY
February 8, 2025; 4:00 p.m., ESPN+		at George Mason	L 67–82	15–8 (4–7)	17 – Fuchs	8 – Fuchs	5 – Thomas	EagleBank Arena (6,861); Fairfax, VA
February 12, 2025; 7:00 p.m., ESPN+		St. Bonaventure	W 68–64	16–8 (5–7)	20 – Lawrence	10 – Fuchs	7 – Thomas	Ryan Center (4,704); Kingston, RI
February 15, 2025; 4:00 p.m., ESPN+		La Salle	W 86–71	17–8 (6–7)	16 – House	10 – Brown	11 – Thomas	Ryan Center (4,845); Kingston, RI
February 22, 2025; 2:30 p.m., USA		at Saint Louis	L 66–81	17–9 (6–8)	19 – Lawrence	5 – Tied	9 – Thomas	Chaifetz Arena (7,993); St. Louis, MO
February 26, 2025; 7:00 p.m., CBSSN		Dayton	L 77–85	17–10 (6–9)	16 – House	11 – Fuchs	3 – Lawrence	Ryan Center (4,782); Kingston, RI
March 1, 2025; 6:00 p.m., ESPN+		at UMass	L 88–91	17–11 (6–10)	30 – Green	10 – Green	9 – Thomas	Mullins Center (5,024); Amherst, MA
March 5, 2025; 7:00 p.m., ESPN+		at Saint Joseph's	L 74–91	17–12 (6–11)	15 – Thomas	6 – Brown	5 – Thomas	Hagan Arena (2,716); Philadelphia, PA
March 8, 2025; 2:00 p.m., ESPN+		Fordham	W 86–67	18–12 (7–11)	20 – Thomas	10 – Fuchs	7 – Thomas	Ryan Center (5,489); Kingston, RI
A-10 tournament
March 12, 2025; 2:00 p.m., USA	(10)	vs. (15) Fordham; First round	L 71–88	18–13	19 – House	7 – Tied	4 – Thomas	Capital One Arena; Washington, D.C.
*Non-conference game. ^{#}Rankings from AP Poll. (#) Tournament seedings in parentheses. All times are in Eastern Time.
