= 2024–25 Richmond Spiders men's basketball team =

American college basketball season

2024–25 Richmond Spiders men's basketball
- Conference: Atlantic 10 Conference
- Record: 10–22 (5–13 A-10)
- Head coach: Chris Mooney (20th season)
- Associate head coach: Peter Thomas
- Assistant coaches: David Boyden; Will Gipe; Jack Fahed; Darian Dollar
- Home arena: Robins Center

2024–25 Atlantic 10 men's basketball standings
	Conf.				Overall
Team	W		L	PCT	W		L	PCT
VCU †	15	–	3	.833	28	–	7	.800
George Mason	15	–	3	.833	27	–	9	.750
Dayton	12	–	6	.667	23	–	11	.676
Loyola Chicago	12	–	6	.667	25	–	12	.676
Saint Louis	11	–	7	.611	19	–	15	.559
Saint Joseph's	11	–	7	.611	22	–	13	.629
George Washington	9	–	9	.500	21	–	13	.618
St. Bonaventure	9	–	9	.500	22	–	12	.647
Duquesne	8	–	10	.444	13	–	19	.406
Rhode Island	7	–	11	.389	18	–	13	.581
UMass	7	–	11	.389	12	–	20	.375
Davidson	6	–	12	.333	17	–	16	.515
Richmond	5	–	13	.278	10	–	22	.313
La Salle	5	–	13	.278	14	–	19	.424
Fordham	3	–	15	.167	12	–	21	.364
† 2025 A-10 tournament winner

The 2024–25 Richmond Spiders men's basketball team represented the University of Richmond during the 2024–25 NCAA Division I men's basketball season. They were led by 20th-year head coach Chris Mooney and played their home games at the Robins Center in Richmond, Virginia as members of the Atlantic 10 Conference.

== Previous season ==
The Spiders finished the 2023–24 season 23–10, 15–3 in Atlantic 10 play to win a share of the A-10 regular season championship with Loyola Chicago. As a No. 1 seed in the A-10 tournament, they lost in the quarterfinals to Saint Joseph's. They received an at-large bid to the National Invitation Tournament, where they lost in the first round to Virginia Tech.

== Offseason ==
=== Departures ===
Name	Number	Pos.	Height	Weight	Year	Hometown	Reason for departure
Trevor Smith	1	G	6'0"	165	Freshman	Newport News, VA	Transferred to Hampton
Jordan King	2	G	6'0"	175	GS Senior	Albany, NY	Graduated
Dji Bailey	4	G	6'5"	195	Senior	Wilson, NC	Graduate transferred to LSU
Tyler Harris	9	F	6'7"	205	GS Senior	Charlotte, NC	Graduated
Isaiah Bigelow	24	F	6'7"	205	GS Senior	Greensboro, NC	Graduated
Quentin Southall	25	G	6'3"	195	Senior	Alexandria, VA	Walk-on; graduated
Neal Quinn	32	C	7'0"	260	GS Senior	Allendale, NJ	Graduated
Aidan Noyes	35	F	6'7"	195	(redshirt) Sophomore	Cincinnati, OH	Transferred to Belmont

=== Incoming transfers ===
Name	Num	Pos.	Height	Weight	Year	Hometown	Previous school
Dusan Neskovic	7	F	6'8"	205	GS Senior	Banja Luka, Bosnia and Herzegovina	Dartmouth
B. Artis White	8	G	5'10"	155	(redshirt) Senior	Canton, MI	Western Michigan
Jonathan Beagle	9	F	6'10"	240	Junior	Hudson Falls, NY	Albany
Jack d'Entremont	25	F	6'7"	195	GS Senior	Bryn Mawr, PA	Walk-on; Washington and Lee
Apostolos Roumoglou	33	G	6'8"	215	Junior	Xanthi, Greece	UConn
George Washington III	40	G	6’2”	170	Sophomore	Dayton, OH	Michigan

=== Recruiting classes ===
==== 2024 recruiting class ====
College recruiting information
Name	Hometown	School	Height	Weight	Commit date
Jaylen Robinson; SF	Jacksonville, FL	Providence High School	6 ft 6 in (1.98 m)	190 lb (86 kg)	Nov 8, 2023
Jaylen Robinson; SF	Recruit ratings: Rivals: 247Sports: ESPN: (NR)				
Bryson McGlothin; PF	Plano, TX	John Paul II High School	6 ft 7 in (2.01 m)	180 lb (82 kg)	Sep 5, 2023
Bryson McGlothin; PF	Recruit ratings: Rivals: 247Sports: ESPN: (NR)				
Overall recruit ranking:
Note: In many cases, Scout, Rivals, 247Sports, On3, and ESPN may conflict in their listings of height and weight.; In these cases, the average was taken. ESPN grades are on a 100-point scale.; Sources: "Rivals.com 2024 Richmond Commitments". Rivals.; "ESPN 2024 Richmond Commitments". ESPN.; "2024 Team Ranking". Rivals.

== Roster ==
2024–25 Richmond Spiders men's basketball team
Players
Coaches

Pos.	#	Name	Height	Weight	Year	Previous school	Hometown
G	1	Mikkel Tyne	5 ft 10 in (1.78 m)	180 lb (82 kg)	So	Bishop Walsh School	Toronto, ON
G	3	DeLonnie Hunt (C)	6 ft 0 in (1.83 m)	175 lb (79 kg)	GS	Rock Creek Christian Academy; Wagner	Upper Marlboro, MD
G	5	Collin Tanner	6 ft 6 in (1.98 m)	195 lb (88 kg)	So	Combine Academy	Creedmoor, NC
F	7	Dusan Neskovic	6 ft 8 in (2.03 m)	205 lb (93 kg)	GS	Hotchkiss School; Dartmouth	Banja Luka, Bosnia and Herzegovina
G	8	B. Artis White	5 ft 10 in (1.78 m)	155 lb (70 kg)	GS	Canton High School; Western Michigan	Canton, MI
F	9	Jonathan Beagle	6 ft 10 in (2.08 m)	240 lb (109 kg)	Jr	St. Thomas More School; Albany	Hudson Falls, NY
G	10	Liam Weaver (W)	6 ft 2 in (1.88 m)	190 lb (86 kg)	RS Jr	Pembroke Hill School	Shawnee, KS
G	11	Jason Roche	6 ft 5 in (1.96 m)	200 lb (91 kg)	Sr	Saint Mary's College High School; The Citadel	Berkeley, CA
F	12	Ryan Soulis	6 ft 10 in (2.08 m)	215 lb (98 kg)	RS Fr	Asheville School	Athens, Greece
G	13	Jack Graham (W)	6 ft 3 in (1.91 m)	185 lb (84 kg)	So	Milton Academy	Smithfield, RI
G	15	Kirby Mooney (W)	6 ft 3 in (1.91 m)	195 lb (88 kg)	Fr	William Tennent High School	Warminster, PA
C	21	Mike Walz	6 ft 11 in (2.11 m)	255 lb (116 kg)	Jr	Conestoga High School	Berwyn, PA
F	24	Jaylen Robinson	6 ft 6 in (1.98 m)	210 lb (95 kg)	Fr	DME Academy	Jackonville, FL
F	25	Jack D'Entremont (W)	6 ft 7 in (2.01 m)	195 lb (88 kg)	GS	Radnor High School; Washington and Lee	Bryn Mawr, PA
G	33	Apostolos Roumoglou	6 ft 8 in (2.03 m)	215 lb (98 kg)	Jr	P.A.O.K. BC; UConn	Xanthi, Greece
F	35	Bryson McGlothin	6 ft 8 in (2.03 m)	180 lb (82 kg)	Fr	John Paul II High School	Plano, TX
G	40	George Washington III	6 ft 2 in (1.88 m)	195 lb (88 kg)	So	Chaminade Julienne High School; Michigan	Austin, TX

Head coach

- Chris Mooney (Princeton)

Assistant coach(es)

- Peter Thomas (Richmond)
- David Boyden (Western Kentucky)
- Will Gipe (Virginia Tech)
- Jack Fahed (James Madison)
- Darian Dollar (South Florida)

Legend

- (C) Team captain
- (S) Suspended
- (I) Ineligible
- (W) Walk-on
- Injured
- Current redshirt

Roster

== Schedule and results ==
Date time, TV	Rank^{#}	Opponent^{#}	Result	Record	High points	High rebounds	High assists	Site (attendance) city, state
Non-conference regular season
November 6, 2024*; 7:00 p.m., ESPN+		Mount Olive	W 101–68	1–0	17 – Hunt	11 – Walz	4 – Beagle	Robins Center (4,542); Richmond, VA
November 9, 2024*; 6:00 p.m., ESPN+/MASN		Marist	L 72–79	1–1	27 – Hunt	8 – Roumoglou	2 – Tied	Robins Center (5,038); Richmond, VA
November 13, 2024*; 7:00 p.m., ESPN+		at Charlotte	L 48–65	1–2	14 – Neskovic	9 – Beagle	3 – Hunt	Dale F. Halton Arena (3,097); Charlotte, NC
November 16, 2024*; 12:00 p.m., ESPN+		at Bucknell	L 76–80 ^{2OT}	1–3	26 – Hunt	8 – Beagle	4 – White	Sojka Pavilion (1,255); Lewisburg, PA
November 20, 2024*; 7:00 p.m., ESPN+		Maine	W 70–66	2–3	19 – Roche	8 – Beagle	4 – Beagle	Robins Center (4,633); Richmond, VA
November 25, 2024*; 6:00 p.m., FloSports		vs. Florida Tech; Gulf Coast Showcase	W 67–57	3–3	22 – Roche	11 – Roumoglou	6 – Beagle	Hertz Arena (317); Estero, FL
November 26, 2024*; 3:00 p.m., FloSports		vs. Louisiana Tech; Gulf Coast Showcase	L 62–65	3–4	26 – Hunt	10 – Roumoglou	4 – Beagle	Hertz Arena (451); Estero, FL
November 27, 2024*; 6:00 p.m., FloSports		vs. Ball State; Gulf Coast Showcase	W 73–60	4–4	28 – Hunt	9 – Roumoglou	3 – Tied	Hertz Arena (311); Estero, FL
December 8, 2024*; 12:00 p.m., SECN		at No. 2 Auburn	L 54–98	4–5	16 – Tyne	7 – Walz	3 – Tied	Neville Arena (9,121); Auburn, AL
December 14, 2024*; 6:00 p.m., ESPN+/MASN		Belmont	L 86–93	4–6	18 – Tied	8 – Walz	5 – Walz	Robins Center (5,041); Richmond, VA
December 18, 2024*; 7:00 p.m., FloSports		at William & Mary	L 87–93	4–7	20 – Neskovic	6 – Beagle	7 – Hunt	Kaplan Arena (2,393); Williamsburg, VA
December 21, 2024*; 6:00 p.m., ESPN+/MASN		VMI	W 78–71	5–7	23 – Neskovic	8 – Walz	4 – Walz	Robins Center (5,498); Richmond, VA
December 28, 2024*; 6:00 p.m., ESPN+		Florida Gulf Coast	L 57–75	5–8	20 – Neskovic	9 – Neskovic	4 – Hunt	Robins Center (5,457); Richmond, VA
A-10 regular season
December 31, 2024; 4:00 p.m., ESPN+/Monumental		George Washington	W 66–61	6–8 (1–0)	19 – Hunt	15 – Walz	3 – Tied	Robins Center (4,984); Richmond, VA
January 4, 2025; 12:00 p.m., ESPN+		at UMass	W 72–64	7–8 (2–0)	16 – Hunt	9 – Walz	7 – Hunt	Mullins Center (3,046); Amherst, MA
January 8, 2025; 7:00 p.m., ESPN+		at George Mason	L 58–64	7–9 (2–1)	16 – Neskovic	6 – Walz	3 – Tied	EagleBank Arena (2,389); Fairfax, VA
January 11, 2025; 6:00 p.m., ESPN+		Rhode Island	L 64–67 ^{OT}	7–10 (2–2)	28 – Neskovic	8 – Walz	3 – Tied	Robins Center (5,465); Richmond, VA
January 15, 2025; 7:00 p.m., ESPN+		at St. Bonaventure	L 49–63	7–11 (2–3)	12 – Roche	7 – Roumoglou	5 – Roumoglou	Reilly Center (3,596); St. Bonaventure, NY
January 18, 2025; 2:30 p.m., USA		Saint Louis	L 59–63	7–12 (2–4)	20 – Neskovic	10 – Roumoglou	3 – Beagle	Robins Center (5,937); Richmond, VA
January 25, 2025; 6:00 p.m., ESPN+/MASN		Davidson	L 66–72	7–13 (2–5)	17 – Walz	7 – Neskovic	4 – Tyne	Robins Center (6,791); Richmond, VA
January 29, 2025; 7:00 p.m., ESPN+		at George Washington	L 66–75	7–14 (2–6)	17 – White	4 – Tied	3 – Tied	Charles E. Smith Center (1,848); Washington, D.C.
February 1, 2025; 4:00 p.m., CBSSN		at VCU; Capital City Classic	L 49–90	7–15 (2–7)	12 – Neskovic	4 – Walz	3 – White	Siegel Center (7,637); Richmond, VA
February 5, 2025; 7:00 p.m., ESPN+/MASN		Duquesne	W 73–68	8–15 (3–7)	14 – Roche	7 – Roche	2 – White	Robins Center (5,680); Richmond, VA
February 8, 2025; 12:00 p.m., USA		at Davidson	L 60–71	8–16 (3–8)	13 – Tyne	6 – Roumoglou	5 – White	John M. Belk Arena (2,611); Davidson, NC
February 11, 2025; 7:00 p.m., ESPN+/Monumental		Loyola Chicago	L 80–87 ^{OT}	8–17 (3–9)	20 – Walz	7 – Tyne	4 – Tied	Robins Center (4,470); Richmond, VA
February 15, 2025; 6:00 p.m., ESPN+/Monumental		Fordham	W 70–66	9–17 (4–9)	23 – Neskovic	7 – Neskovic	4 – Walz	Robins Center (6,226); Richmond, VA
February 19, 2025; 6:30 p.m., ESPN+		at La Salle	W 63–58	10–17 (5–9)	17 – Tyne	11 – Walz	6 – Walz	Tom Gola Arena (1,435); Philadelphia, PA
February 22, 2025; 12:30 p.m., USA		at Saint Joseph's	L 62–78	10–18 (5–10)	14 – Neskovic	5 – Walz	5 – Tied	Hagan Arena (3,402); Philadelphia, PA
February 25, 2025; 7:00 p.m., CBSSN		VCU; Capital City Classic	L 60–78	10–19 (5–11)	16 – Neskovic	4 – Walz	4 – Neskovic	Robins Center (6,420); Richmond, VA
March 1, 2025; 2:00 p.m., CBSSN		at Dayton	L 64–74 ^{2OT}	10–20 (5–12)	17 – Neskovic	7 – Tied	5 – Walz	UD Arena (13,407); Dayton, OH
March 8, 2025; 6:00 p.m., ESPN+/MASN		George Mason	L 60–64	10–21 (5–13)	16 – White	6 – Walz	4 – White	Robins Center (6,153); Richmond, VA
A-10 tournament
March 12, 2025; 11:30 a.m., USA	(13)	vs. (12) Davidson; First round	L 65–69	10–22	17 – White	10 – Walz	4 – Walz	Capital One Arena (4,735); Washington, D.C.
*Non-conference game. ^{#}Rankings from AP poll. (#) Tournament seedings in parentheses. All times are in Eastern.
