= 2024–25 George Washington Revolutionaries men's basketball team =

American college basketball season

2024–25 George Washington Revolutionaries men's basketball

College Basketball Crown, First Round
- Conference: Atlantic 10 Conference
- Record: 21–13 (9–9 A–10)
- Head coach: Chris Caputo (3rd season)
- Assistant coaches: Dwayne Lee; Lamont Franklin; Matt Colpoys; Aaron Thompson
- Home arena: Charles E. Smith Center

2024–25 Atlantic 10 men's basketball standings
	Conf.				Overall
Team	W		L	PCT	W		L	PCT
VCU †	15	–	3	.833	28	–	7	.800
George Mason	15	–	3	.833	27	–	9	.750
Dayton	12	–	6	.667	23	–	11	.676
Loyola Chicago	12	–	6	.667	25	–	12	.676
Saint Louis	11	–	7	.611	19	–	15	.559
Saint Joseph's	11	–	7	.611	22	–	13	.629
George Washington	9	–	9	.500	21	–	13	.618
St. Bonaventure	9	–	9	.500	22	–	12	.647
Duquesne	8	–	10	.444	13	–	19	.406
Rhode Island	7	–	11	.389	18	–	13	.581
UMass	7	–	11	.389	12	–	20	.375
Davidson	6	–	12	.333	17	–	16	.515
Richmond	5	–	13	.278	10	–	22	.313
La Salle	5	–	13	.278	14	–	19	.424
Fordham	3	–	15	.167	12	–	21	.364
† 2025 A-10 tournament winner

The 2024–25 George Washington Revolutionaries men's basketball team represented George Washington University during the 2024–25 NCAA Division I men's basketball season. The team, led by third-year head coach Chris Caputo, played their home games at Charles E. Smith Center in Washington, D.C. as a member of the Atlantic 10 Conference.

== Previous season ==
The Revolutionaries finished the 2023–24 season 15–17, with a 4–14 record in A-10 play to finish in last place. They lost to La Salle in the first round of the A-10 tournament.

== Offseason ==
=== Departures ===
Name	Number	Pos.	Height	Weight	Year	Hometown	Reason for departure
Maximus Edwards	2	G	6'5"	215	RS Sophomore	Stratford, CT	Transferred to Duquesne
James Bishop IV	11	G	6'2"	190	Senior	Baltimore, MD	Graduated
Babatunde Akingbola	23	C	6'10"	225	GS Senior	Ogun, Nigeria	Graduated
Benny Schröder	24	G/F	6'7"	200	Sophomore	Munich, Germany	Play professionally
Luke Cronin	32	F	6'8"	215	Freshman	Great Neck, NY	Transferred to Yeshiva
Antoine Smith	34	F	6'7"	210	GS Senior	Westerville, OH	Graduated

=== Incoming transfers ===
Name	Number	Pos.	Height	Weight	Year	Hometown	Previous School
Trey Moss	1	G	6'3"	185	RS Junior	Orlando, FL	William & Mary
Gerald Drumgoole Jr.	5	G	6'5"	210	GS Senior	Rochester, NY	Delaware
Sean Hansen	20	F	6'9"	245	GS Senior	Ramsey, NJ	Cornell
Rafael Castro	30	F	6'11"	220	RS Junior	Dover, NJ	Providence

=== Recruiting classes ===
==== 2024 recruiting class ====
College recruiting information
Name	Hometown	School	Height	Weight	Commit date
Ty Bevins; SG	Clinton, MD	Gwynn Park High School	6 ft 5 in (1.96 m)	190 lb (86 kg)	Sep 8, 2023
Ty Bevins; SG	Recruit ratings: Scout: Rivals: 247Sports: ESPN: (78)				
Dayan Nessah; SF	Geneva, Switzerland	Lycee Francais de Barcelone	6 ft 7 in (2.01 m)	200 lb (91 kg)	Jul 19, 2024
Dayan Nessah; SF	Recruit ratings: Scout: Rivals: 247Sports: ESPN: (NR)				
Overall recruit ranking:
Note: In many cases, Scout, Rivals, 247Sports, On3, and ESPN may conflict in their listings of height and weight.; In these cases, the average was taken. ESPN grades are on a 100-point scale.; Sources: "2024 Team Ranking". Rivals.

== Roster ==
2024–25 George Washington Revolutionaries men's basketball team
Players
Coaches

Pos.	#	Name	Height	Weight	Year	Previous school	Hometown
G	0	Trey Autry	6 ft 4 in (1.93 m)	200 lb (91 kg)	So	Western Reserve Academy	Jamesville, New York
G	1	Trey Moss	6 ft 3 in (1.91 m)	185 lb (84 kg)	RS Jr	William & Mary	Orlando, Florida
G	2	Christian Jones	6 ft 2 in (1.88 m)	190 lb (86 kg)	RS Fr	Our Saviour Lutheran School	Stratford, Connecticut
F	3	Darren Buchanan Jr.	6 ft 7 in (2.01 m)	235 lb (107 kg)	RS So	Virginia Tech	Washington, D.C.
G	4	Jacoi Hutchinson	6 ft 3 in (1.91 m)	185 lb (84 kg)	So	IMG Academy	Laurel, Maryland
G	5	Gerald Drumgoole Jr.	6 ft 5 in (1.96 m)	210 lb (95 kg)	GS	Delaware	Rochester, New York
F	7	Dayan Nessah	6 ft 7 in (2.01 m)	200 lb (91 kg)	Fr	Lycée Français de Barcelone	Geneva, Switzerland
F	8	Zamoku Weluche-Ume	6 ft 8 in (2.03 m)	220 lb (100 kg)	So	Barking Abbey School	London, England
G/F	9	Garrett Johnson	6 ft 8 in (2.03 m)	210 lb (95 kg)	RS So	Princeton	Oakton, Virginia
G	10	Laziz Talipov (W)	6 ft 1 in (1.85 m)	165 lb (75 kg)	So	Trinity Preparatory School	Orlando, Florida
G	11	Ty Bevins	6 ft 5 in (1.96 m)	190 lb (86 kg)	Fr	Gwynn Park High School	Clinton, Maryland
F	14	Keegan Harvey	6 ft 11 in (2.11 m)	230 lb (104 kg)	RS Sr	Charleston	Newcastle, Australia
F	20	Sean Hansen	6 ft 9 in (2.06 m)	245 lb (111 kg)	GS	Cornell	Ramsey, New Jersey
G	21	Mohamed Binzagr (W)	6 ft 2 in (1.88 m)	165 lb (75 kg)	Jr	Cushing Academy	Jeddah, Saudi Arabia
F	30	Rafael Castro	6 ft 11 in (2.11 m)	220 lb (100 kg)	RS Jr	Providence	Dover, New Jersey
G	32	Amir Arrington (W)	5 ft 10 in (1.78 m)	170 lb (77 kg)	So	The Galloway School	Atlanta, Georgia

Head coach

- Chris Caputo (Westfield State)

Assistant coach(es)

- Dwayne Lee (Saint Joseph's)
- Lamont Franklin (UNC Wilmington)
- Matt Colpoys (Penn State Behrend)
- Aaron Thompson (Butler)

Legend

- (C) Team captain
- (S) Suspended
- (I) Ineligible
- (W) Walk-on
- Injured
- Current redshirt

Roster
Last update: September 8, 2024

== Schedule and results ==
Date time, TV	Rank^{#}	Opponent^{#}	Result	Record	High points	High rebounds	High assists	Site (attendance) city, state
Non-conference regular season
November 4, 2024*; 8:00 p.m., ESPN+		Mercyhurst	W 76–59	1–0	19 – Buchanan Jr.	10 – Buchanan Jr.	4 – Hutchinson	Charles E. Smith Center (1,851); Washington, D.C.
November 8, 2024*; 7:00 p.m., ESPN+		Hampton	W 82–54	2–0	14 – Autry	11 – Buchanan Jr.	4 – Jones	Charles E. Smith Center (2,118); Washington, D.C.
November 12, 2024*; 7:00 p.m., ESPN+		North Carolina A&T	W 85–80	3–0	20 – Buchanan Jr.	12 – Castro	3 – Hutchinson	Charles E. Smith Center (1,598); Washington, D.C.
November 18, 2024*; 7:00 p.m., ESPN+		NJIT	W 84–64	4–0	20 – Buchanan Jr.	9 – Castro	6 – Buchanan Jr.	Charles E. Smith Center (1,682); Washington, D.C.
November 22, 2024*; 8:00 p.m., ESPN+		vs. Kansas State; Paradise Jam Quarterfinal	L 71–83	4–1	19 – Hutchinson	7 – Buchanan Jr.	5 – Buchanan Jr.	Sports and Fitness Center (2,125); Saint Thomas, U.S. Virgin Islands
November 23, 2024*; 5:30 p.m., ESPN+		vs. Louisiana; Paradise Jam Consolation Semifinal	W 83–74	5–1	17 – Buchanan Jr.	11 – Castro	7 – Hutchinson	Sports and Fitness Center (1,886); Saint Thomas, U.S. Virgin Islands
November 25, 2024*; 3:00 p.m., ESPN+		vs. Illinois State; Paradise Jam Fourth Place	W 72–64	6–1	16 – Tied	10 – Buchanan Jr.	4 – Tied	Sports and Fitness Center (1,986); Saint Thomas, U.S. Virgin Islands
November 29, 2024*; 2:00 p.m., ESPN+		VMI	W 77–64	7–1	17 – Buchanan Jr.	7 – Castro	6 – Buchanan Jr.	Charles E. Smith Center (1,294); Washington, D.C.
December 4, 2024*; 7:00 p.m., ESPN+		at American	L 71–81 ^{OT}	7–2	24 – Buchanan Jr.	9 – Tied	5 – Hutchinson	Bender Arena (1,624); Washington, D.C.
December 7, 2024*; 4:00 p.m., ESPN+		at Old Dominion	W 78–70	8–2	17 – Jones	7 – Hansen	4 – Hansen	Chartway Arena (5,109); Norfolk, VA
December 13, 2024*; 7:00 p.m., ESPN+		Army	W 75–60	9–2	19 – Moss	12 – Castro	5 – Moss	Charles E. Smith Center (2,049); Washington, D.C.
December 18, 2024*; 7:00 p.m., ESPN+		Lafayette	W 82–62	10–2	30 – Drumgoole Jr.	9 – Castro	3 – Hansen	Charles E. Smith Center (1,196); Washington, D.C.
December 22, 2024*; 12:00 p.m., ESPN+		UVA Wise	W 102–62	11–2	19 – Nessah	14 – Castro	5 – Hansen	Charles E. Smith Center (1,011); Washington, D.C.
Atlantic 10 regular season
December 31, 2024; 4:00 p.m., ESPN+		at Richmond	L 61–66	11–3 (0–1)	27 – Drumgoole Jr.	11 – Castro	3 – Buchanan Jr.	Robins Center (4,984); Richmond, VA
January 4, 2025; 12:00 p.m., USA		Dayton	W 82–62	12–3 (1–1)	23 – Jones	8 – Castro	4 – Hansen	Charles E. Smith Center (3,035); Washington, D.C.
January 8, 2025; 7:00 p.m., ESPN+		at Rhode Island	W 75–67	13–3 (2–1)	16 – Castro	10 – Autry	6 – Jones	Ryan Center (4,261); Kingston, RI
January 15, 2025; 7:00 p.m., ESPN+		Duquesne	L 65–73	13–4 (2–2)	27 – Castro	13 – Castro	4 – Jones	Charles E. Smith Center (1,662); Washington, D.C.
January 18, 2025; 12:30 p.m., USA		at George Mason; Revolutionary Rivalry	L 77–80 ^{2OT}	13–5 (2–3)	16 – Jones	11 – Castro	4 – Tied	EagleBank Arena (4,397); Fairfax, VA
January 22, 2025; 7:00 p.m., ESPN+		at UMass	L 61–74	13–6 (2–4)	23 – Castro	7 – Castro	6 – Jones	Mullins Center (2,772); Amherst, MA
January 25, 2025; 2:00 p.m., ESPN+		Saint Louis	W 67–61	14–6 (3–4)	21 – Castro	9 – Castro	4 – Tied	Charles E. Smith Center (2,557); Washington, D.C.
January 29, 2025; 7:00 p.m., ESPN+		Richmond	W 75–66	15–6 (4–4)	21 – Castro	16 – Castro	5 – Hutchinson	Charles E. Smith Center (1,848); Washington, D.C.
February 1, 2025; 2:30 p.m., USA		at La Salle	L 67–73	15–7 (4–5)	19 – Drumgoole Jr.	9 – Castro	5 – Jones	Tom Gola Arena (2,005); Philadelphia, PA
February 5, 2025; 7:00 p.m., ESPN+		George Mason; Revolutionary Rivalry	L 50–53	15–8 (4–6)	17 – Jones	10 – Castro	4 – Castro	Charles E. Smith Center (2,407); Washington, D.C.
February 9, 2025; 12:00 p.m., USA		at St. Bonaventure	W 62–52	16–8 (5–6)	15 – Tied	10 – Autry	3 – Tied	Reilly Center (3,846); St. Bonaventure, NY
February 12, 2025; 7:00 p.m., Peacock		VCU	L 72–80	16–9 (5–7)	23 – Autry	6 – Buchanan Jr.	4 – Castro	Charles E. Smith Center (2,078); Washington, D.C.
February 15, 2025; 4:00 p.m., ESPN+		at Davidson	W 74–67	17–9 (6–7)	20 – Castro	7 – Autry	4 – Jones	John M. Belk Arena (3,214); Davidson, NC
February 19, 2025; 7:00 p.m., ESPN+		Saint Joseph's	L 68–79	17–10 (6–8)	20 – Castro	11 – Castro	5 – Jones	Charles E. Smith Center (1,810); Washington, D.C.
February 22, 2025; 6:00 p.m., ESPN+		UMass	W 74–52	18–10 (7–8)	17 – Jones	11 – Castro	5 – Jones	Charles E. Smith Center (2,842); Washington, D.C.
February 26, 2025; 8:00 p.m., ESPN+		at Loyola Chicago	L 57–77	18–11 (7–9)	18 – Castro	8 – Castro	3 – Moss	Joseph J. Gentile Arena (2,751); Chicago, IL
March 1, 2025; 6:00 p.m., ESPN+		La Salle	W 71–60	19–11 (8–9)	22 – Castro	16 – Castro	3 – Tied	Charles E. Smith Center (2,554); Washington, D.C.
March 5, 2025; 7:00 p.m., ESPN+		at Fordham	W 81–58	20–11 (9–9)	16 – Castro	8 – Castro	4 – Hansen	Rose Hill Gymnasium (1,134); New York, NY
Atlantic 10 tournament
March 13, 2025; 5:00 p.m., USA	(7)	vs. (15) Fordham; Second round	W 88–81	21–11	23 – Autry	8 – Castro	4 – Castro	Capital One Arena; Washington, D.C.
March 14, 2025; 5:00 p.m., USA	(7)	vs. (2) George Mason; Quarterfinals	L 65–80	21–12	17 – Castro	5 – Tied	3 – Buchanan Jr.	Capital One Arena; Washington, D.C.
College Basketball Crown
March 31, 2025*; 5:30 p.m., FS1		vs. Boise State; First round	L 59–89	21–13	16 – Autry	7 – Buchanan Jr.	4 – Jones	MGM Grand Garden Arena (2,119); Paradise, NV
*Non-conference game. ^{#}Rankings from AP Poll. (#) Tournament seedings in parentheses. All times are in Eastern Time.
