= 2024–25 George Mason Patriots men's basketball team =

American college basketball season

2024–25 George Mason Patriots men's basketball

Atlantic 10 regular-season co-champions

NIT, Second round
- Conference: Atlantic 10 Conference
- Record: 27–9 (15–3 A–10)
- Head coach: Tony Skinn (2nd season)
- Associate head coach: Steve Curran
- Assistant coaches: Louis Hinnant; Serge Clement
- Home arena: EagleBank Arena

2024–25 Atlantic 10 men's basketball standings
	Conf.				Overall
Team	W		L	PCT	W		L	PCT
VCU †	15	–	3	.833	28	–	7	.800
George Mason	15	–	3	.833	27	–	9	.750
Dayton	12	–	6	.667	23	–	11	.676
Loyola Chicago	12	–	6	.667	25	–	12	.676
Saint Louis	11	–	7	.611	19	–	15	.559
Saint Joseph's	11	–	7	.611	22	–	13	.629
George Washington	9	–	9	.500	21	–	13	.618
St. Bonaventure	9	–	9	.500	22	–	12	.647
Duquesne	8	–	10	.444	13	–	19	.406
Rhode Island	7	–	11	.389	18	–	13	.581
UMass	7	–	11	.389	12	–	20	.375
Davidson	6	–	12	.333	17	–	16	.515
Richmond	5	–	13	.278	10	–	22	.313
La Salle	5	–	13	.278	14	–	19	.424
Fordham	3	–	15	.167	12	–	21	.364
† 2025 A-10 tournament winner

The 2024–25 George Mason Patriots Men's basketball team represented George Mason University during the 2024–25 NCAA Division I men's basketball season. The season was the 59th for the program, the second under head coach Tony Skinn, and the twelfth as members of the Atlantic 10 Conference (A-10). The Patriots played their home games at EagleBank Arena in Fairfax, Virginia.

The 2025 season was one of the most successful seasons in George Mason history, and the program's most successful season since joining the Atlantic 10. Mason posted 26 wins, their most since 2011, were regular season co-champions of the Atlantic 10, their first regular season title also since 2011, and reached a conference tournament championship game for the first time since 2009.

== Previous season ==
The Patriots finished the previous season 20–12, 9–9 in A-10 play, to finish in eighth place. They lost to Saint Joseph's in the second round of the A-10 tournament.

== Offseason ==
=== Departures ===
Name	Pos.	Year	Notes
Berke Arslan	G	Freshman	Transferred to Macalester College
Devin Dinkins	G	Sophomore	Transferred to Manhattan
Kam Johnson	G	Junior	Transferred to Elizabeth City State
Ronald Polite III	G	Senior	Transferred to UNC Greensboro
Baraka Okojie	G	Freshman	Transferred to Memphis
Keyshawn Hall	F	Sophomore	Transferred to UCF
Amari Kelly	F	Graduate Senior	Graduated
Malik Henry	F	Senior	Transferred to UNC Greensboro

=== Arrivals ===
Name	Pos.	Year	Notes
Giovanni Emejuru	F	Junior	Transferred from Siena
Brayden O'Connor	G	Junior	Transferred from UMass Lowell
Jeremiah Quigley	G	Sophomore	Transferred from Iona
K. D. Johnson	G	Senior	Transferred from Auburn
Zach Anderson	F	Senior	Transferred from FGCU

== Honors and awards ==
Atlantic 10 Coach of the Year

- Tony Skinn

Atlantic 10 Defensive Player of the Year

- Jared Billups

All Atlantic 10 First Team

- Jalen Haynes

All Atlantic 10 Third Team

- Darius Maddox

== Roster ==
2024–25 George Mason Patriots men's basketball team
Players
Coaches

Pos.	#	Name	Height	Weight	Year	Previous school	Hometown
G	0	K. D. Johnson	6 ft 0 in (1.83 m)	195 lb (88 kg)	Sr	Auburn	Atlanta, GA
G	1	Jared Billups	6 ft 4 in (1.93 m)	195 lb (88 kg)	Sr	Siena	Waldorf, MD
G/F	2	Woody Newton	6 ft 9 in (2.06 m)	206 lb (93 kg)	GS	Oklahoma State	District Heights, MD
G	3	Jeremiah Quigley	5 ft 11 in (1.8 m)	167 lb (76 kg)	So	Iona	Accokeek, MD
G	4	Brayden O’Connor	6 ft 4 in (1.93 m)	212 lb (96 kg)	Jr	UMass Lowell	Ottawa, Ontario
F	5	Giovanni Emejuru	6 ft 11 in (2.11 m)	265 lb (120 kg)	RS Jr	Siena	Leicester, England
G	7	Bryson Cokley	6 ft 6 in (1.98 m)	188 lb (85 kg)	Fr	The Christ School	Whiteville, NC
F	9	Stas Sivka	6 ft 10 in (2.08 m)	210 lb (95 kg)	Fr	BC Rogaska	Celje, Slovenia
F	10	Zach Anderson	6 ft 7 in (2.01 m)	—	GS	FGCU	Apopka, FL
F	11	Jalen Haynes	6 ft 8 in (2.03 m)	265 lb (120 kg)	Sr	East Tennessee State	Fort Lauderdale, FL
G	13	Darius Maddox	6 ft 5 in (1.96 m)	185 lb (84 kg)	GS	Virginia Tech	Bowie, MD
G	14	T.J. Prosise	6 ft 3 in (1.91 m)	175 lb (79 kg)	Fr	Life Christian Academy	Chesterfield, VA
G	23	Justin Begg	6 ft 0 in (1.83 m)	185 lb (84 kg)	Fr	Episcopal	Houston, TX
G	24	Austin Ball	6 ft 7 in (2.01 m)	205 lb (93 kg)	RS So	The Miller School	Man, WV
G	30	Chase Tucker (W)	6 ft 1 in (1.85 m)	185 lb (84 kg)	Jr	Mount Pisgah Christian School	Alpharetta, GA

Head coach

- Tony Skinn (George Mason)

Assistant coach(es)

- Steve Curran (Merrimack)
- Louis Hinnant (Boston College)
- Mike Ekanem (Texas Lutheran)

Legend

- (C) Team captain
- (S) Suspended
- (I) Ineligible
- (W) Walk-on
- Injured
- Current redshirt

Roster
Last update: August 6, 2024

== Player statistics ==
Player	GP	GS	MPG	FG%	3FG%	FT%	RPG	APG	SPG	BPG	PPG
Jalen Haynes	36	36	25.7	.554	.176	.604	6.9	1.4	0.8	0.6	14.1
Darius Maddox	35	35	32.5	.409	.352	.884	2.9	1.1	1.1	0.2	13.8
Brayden O'Connor	36	36	28.0	.448	.376	.804	2.8	3.0	0.9	0.3	9.1
K.D. Johnson	34	1	21.9	.418	.370	.724	2.7	2.7	1.3	0.1	7.9
Woody Newton	35	35	22.0	.387	.351	.740	3.8	0.8	0.7	0.8	6.9
Giovanni Emejuru	36	0	16.2	.674	.000	.556	4.0	0.2	0.4	0.5	6.2
Ben Woodward	1	0	2.0	1.000	1.000	.000	0.0	0.0	0.0	0.0	6.0
Zach Anderson	36	31	21.6	.397	.400	.700	3.5	0.9	0.4	0.3	5.3
Jared Billups	34	6	27.4	.398	.273	.800	5.8	1.5	1.6	0.5	5.2
Justin Begg	33	0	9.3	.384	.333	.684	0.7	1.2	0.5	0.0	2.9
T.J. Prosise	1	0	2.0	1.000	.000	.000	0.0	0.0	0.0	0.0	2.0
Stas Sivka	14	0	4.6	.615	.500	.333	0.9	0.1	0.1	0.1	1.5
Bryson Cokley	9	0	2.3	.571	.250	1.000	0.3	0.0	0.1	0.0	1.2
Jeremiah Quigley	9	0	8.1	.182	.250	.600	0.8	1.2	0.1	0.0	1.2
Chase Tucker	2	0	2.0	.250	.000	.000	0.5	0.0	0.5	0.0	1.0

== Schedule and results ==
Date time, TV	Rank^{#}	Opponent^{#}	Result	Record	High points	High rebounds	High assists	Site (attendance) city, state
Exhibition
October 26, 2024*; 2:00 p.m.		St. Mary's (MD)	W 91–62	–	19 – Emejuru	8 – Emejuru	6 – Begg	EagleBank Arena (1,844); Fairfax, VA
Non-conference regular season
November 4, 2024*; 7:00 p.m., ESPN+		North Carolina Central	W 75–58	1–0	17 – Maddox	10 – Billups	4 – Johnson	EagleBank Arena (3,207); Fairfax, VA
November 8, 2024*; 9:00 p.m., Peacock		at No. 18 Marquette; Marquette Classic	L 63–82	1–1	20 – Maddox	7 – Billups	3 – O'Connor	Al McGuire Center (3,750); Milwaukee, WI
November 11, 2024*; 7:00 p.m., ESPN+		Stony Brook; Marquette Classic	W 94–56	2–1	20 – Maddox	9 – Newton	6 – Johnson	EagleBank Arena (2,916); Fairfax, VA
November 13, 2024*; 7:00 p.m., ESPN+		Central Michigan; Marquette Classic	L 69–70	2–2	15 – Maddox	9 – Billups	3 – Billups	EagleBank Arena (2,248); Fairfax, VA
November 16, 2024*; 4:00 p.m., ESPN+		at East Carolina	L 77–78 ^{2OT}	2–3	20 – Maddox	9 – Emejuru	3 – Tied	Williams Arena (3,916); Greenville, NC
November 20, 2024*; 7:00 p.m., ESPN+		Coppin State	W 93–55	3–3	21 – Anderson	7 – Emejuru	4 – Tied	EagleBank Arena (2,290); Fairfax, VA
November 23, 2024*; 2:00 p.m., ESPN+		Ferrum	W 100–55	4–3	26 – Newton	7 – Johnson	5 – O'Connor	EagleBank Arena (2,608); Fairfax, VA
November 29, 2024*; 4:00 p.m., ESPN+		at James Madison	W 66–61	5–3	20 – Haynes	8 – Haynes	3 – Tied	Atlantic Union Bank Center (4,611); Harrisonburg, VA
December 3, 2024*; 7:00 p.m., ESPN+		UNC Asheville	W 74–52	6–3	25 – Haynes	10 – Haynes	5 – O'Connor	EagleBank Arena (2,340); Fairfax, VA
December 7, 2024*; 2:00 p.m., ESPN+		Tulane	W 76–64	7–3	17 – Tied	12 – Haynes	4 – O'Connor	EagleBank Arena (2,725); Fairfax, VA
December 17, 2024*; 7:00 p.m., ACCN		at No. 5 Duke	L 47–68	7–4	18 – Haynes	10 – Emejuru	2 – Tied	Cameron Indoor Stadium (9,314); Durham, NC
December 22, 2024*; 2:00 p.m., ESPN+		Penn	W 85–53	8–4	15 – Haynes	10 – Haynes	6 – Maddox	EagleBank Arena (2,955); Fairfax, VA
December 28, 2024*; 2:00 p.m., ESPN+		Mount St. Mary's	W 64–56	9–4	18 – Haynes	16 – Haynes	3 – Billups	EagleBank Arena (3,295); Fairfax, VA
Atlantic 10 regular season
December 31, 2024; 2:00 p.m., ESPN+		Davidson	W 69–57	10–4 (1–0)	19 – O'Connor	6 – Emejuru	4 – Tied	EagleBank Arena (3,105); Fairfax, VA
January 4, 2025; 2:00 p.m., USA		at Rhode Island	L 59–62	10–5 (1–1)	14 – Maddox	12 – Haynes	4 – Johnson	Ryan Center (5,803); Kingston, RI
January 8, 2025; 7:00 p.m., ESPN+		Richmond	W 64–58	11–5 (2–1)	16 – O'Connor	8 – Emejuru	4 – O'Connor	EagleBank Arena (2,389); Fairfax, VA
January 11, 2025; 2:00 p.m., ESPN+		UMass	W 77–70	12–5 (3–1)	18 – Maddox	8 – Haynes	5 – Begg	EagleBank Arena (3,214); Fairfax, VA
January 15, 2025; 7:00 p.m., CBSSN		at Dayton	W 67–59	13–5 (4–1)	20 – Maddox	6 – Billups	4 – Tied	UD Arena (13,407); Dayton, OH
January 18, 2025; 12:30 p.m., USA		George Washington; Revolutionary Rivalry	W 80–77 ^{2OT}	14–5 (5–1)	17 – Tied	16 – Billups	3 – Johnson	EagleBank Arena (4,397); Fairfax, VA
January 21, 2025; 7:00 p.m., ESPN+		at St. Bonaventure	W 75–62	15–5 (6–1)	17 – Anderson	7 – Tied	6 – Johnson	Reilly Center (3,729); St. Bonaventure, NY
January 29, 2025; 7:00 p.m., ESPN+		Loyola Chicago	W 58–53 ^{OT}	16–5 (7–1)	14 – Haynes	7 – Billups	2 – Tied	EagleBank Arena (3,423); Fairfax, VA
February 1, 2025; 4:00 p.m., ESPN+		at Davidson	W 64–60	17–5 (8–1)	12 – Tied	7 – Emejuru	4 – Johnson	John M. Belk Arena (2,965); Davidson, NC
February 5, 2025; 7:00 p.m., ESPN+		at George Washington; Revolutionary Rivalry	W 53–50	18–5 (9–1)	17 – Haynes	7 – Haynes	4 – Begg	Charles E. Smith Center (2,407); Washington, D.C.
February 8, 2025; 2:00 p.m., ESPN+		Rhode Island; Homecoming	W 82–67	19–5 (10–1)	24 – Maddox	7 – Haynes	3 – Haynes	EagleBank Arena (6,861); Fairfax, VA
February 11, 2025; 8:00 p.m., ESPN+		at Saint Louis	W 76–74 ^{OT}	20–5 (11–1)	27 – Newton	8 – Haynes	4 – Tied	Chaifetz Arena (6,237); St. Louis, MO
February 15, 2025; 12:30 p.m., USA		Saint Joseph's	W 58–57	21–5 (12–1)	22 – Haynes	8 – Haynes	4 – O'Connor	EagleBank Arena (5,219); Fairfax, VA
February 22, 2025; 4:00 p.m., CBSSN		at VCU; Rivalry	L 54–70	21–6 (12–2)	12 – Maddox	8 – Haynes	3 – Johnson	Siegel Center (7,637); Richmond, VA
February 26, 2025; 7:00 p.m., ESPN+		Fordham	W 74–64	22–6 (13–2)	25 – Haynes	8 – Billups	4 – O'Connor	EagleBank Arena (3,385); Fairfax, VA
March 1, 2025; 2:00 p.m., ESPN+		at Duquesne	L 68–85	22–7 (13–3)	14 – Haynes	7 – Haynes	4 – O'Connor	UPMC Cooper Fieldhouse (2,581); Pittsburgh, PA
March 5, 2025; 7:00 p.m., ESPN+		La Salle	W 69–62	23–7 (14–3)	26 – O'Connor	10 – Haynes	5 – O'Connor	EagleBank Arena (3,778); Fairfax, VA
March 8, 2025; 6:00 p.m., ESPN+/MASN		at Richmond	W 64–60	24–7 (15–3)	18 – Maddox	8 – Haynes	4 – Johnson	Robins Center (6,153); Richmond, VA
Atlantic 10 tournament
March 14, 2025; 5:00 p.m., USA	(2)	vs. (7) George Washington; Quarterfinals	W 80–65	25–7	24 – Haynes	7 – Billups	5 – Johnson	Capital One Arena; Washington, D.C.
March 15, 2025; 3:30 p.m., CBSSN	(2)	vs. (6) Saint Joseph's; Semifinals	W 74–64	26–7	22 – Haynes	7 – Tied	6 – Haynes	Capital One Arena (9,355); Washington, D.C.
March 16, 2025; 1:00 p.m., CBS	(2)	vs. (1) VCU; Championship/Rivalry	L 63–68	26–8	17 – Haynes	8 – Haynes	3 – Tied	Capital One Arena (12,516); Washington, D.C.
NIT
March 19, 2025; 7:00 p.m., ESPN+	(2)	Samford; First round – Dayton Region	W 86–69	27–8	20 – Johnson	10 – Anderson	5 – Johnson	EagleBank Arena (2,021); Fairfax, VA
March 22, 2025; 2:00 p.m., ESPN+	(2)	(3) Bradley; Second round – Dayton Region	L 67–75	27–9	16 – Johnson	5 – Maddox	6 – O'Connor	EagleBank Arena (2,180); Fairfax, VA
*Non-conference game. ^{#}Rankings from AP poll. (#) Tournament seedings in parentheses. All times are in Eastern Time.
