= Roberts Blūms =

Latvian basketball player

Penn State Nittany Lions
- Position: Shooting guard
- Conference: Big Ten Conference

Personal information
- Born: November 2, 2005 (age 21) Riga, Latvia
- Listed height: 6 ft 4 in (1.93 m)
- Listed weight: 190 lb (86 kg)

Career information
- College: Davidson (2024–2026); Penn State (2026–present)
- Playing career: 2023–2024

Career history
- 2023–2024: VEF Rīga

Career highlights
- Latvian Cup winner (2024); LBL champion (2024)
Medals
Men's basketball
Representing Latvia
European U-18 Championship Division B
Gold medal – first place	2023 Portugal	U-18

Roberts Blūms (born November 2, 2005) is a Latvian college basketball player for the Penn State Nittany Lions of the Big Ten Conference. He previously played for the Davidson Wildcats.

== Career ==
During the 2022–23 season Blūms played in ASVEL Basket youth system, participating in LNB Espoirs and Euroleague Basketball Next Generation Tournament. In the summer of 2023 he agreed to join Saint-Quentin system. He later changed his mind and joined VEF Rīga in his homeland.

On January 21, 2024, Blūms left his name in the Latvian-Estonian Basketball League history books. The 18-year-old guard repeated the league record by scoring 41 points in a game against Kalev/SNABB. On April 16, 2024, Blums declared for the 2024 NBA Draft.

== National team ==
In 2023 Blūms led U-18 to a gold medal in 2023 FIBA U18 European Championship Division B and was named the MVP of the tournament.

In February 2024 for the first time in his career Blūms was included in the candidate list of Latvia men's national basketball team but did not yet participate in any of games during the first window of EuroBasket 2025 qualifiers.

== Personal life ==
Roberts is the son of long-time Latvia national team captain Jānis Blūms.
