= 2025–26 Saint Louis Billikens men's basketball team =

American college basketball season

2025–26 Saint Louis Billikens men's basketball
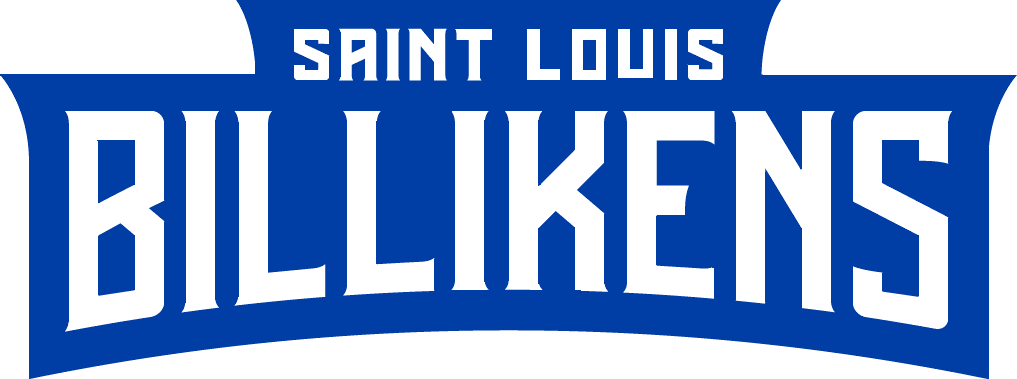

A-10 regular-season co-champions

NCAA tournament, Second round
- Conference: Atlantic 10 Conference
- Record: 29–6 (15–3 A–10)
- Head coach: Josh Schertz (2nd season)
- Assistant coaches: Zak Boisvert; Antone Gray; Corey Tate; Rob Gardiner; Phil Gaetano
- Home arena: Chaifetz Arena

2025–26 Atlantic 10 men's basketball standings
	Conf.				Overall
Team	W		L	PCT	W		L	PCT
Saint Louis	15	–	3	.833	29	–	6	.829
VCU †	15	–	3	.833	28	–	8	.778
Saint Joseph's	13	–	5	.722	24	–	12	.667
Dayton	12	–	6	.667	25	–	12	.676
George Mason	11	–	7	.611	23	–	10	.697
Davidson	10	–	8	.556	20	–	14	.588
Duquesne	9	–	9	.500	18	–	15	.545
Fordham	8	–	10	.444	17	–	15	.531
George Washington	8	–	10	.444	19	–	16	.543
Rhode Island	7	–	11	.389	16	–	16	.500
Richmond	5	–	13	.278	15	–	17	.469
La Salle	5	–	13	.278	9	–	23	.281
St. Bonaventure	4	–	14	.222	17	–	17	.500
Loyola Chicago	4	–	14	.222	9	–	24	.273
† 2026 A-10 tournament winner

The 2025–26 Saint Louis Billikens men's basketball team represented Saint Louis University during the 2025–26 NCAA Division I men's basketball season. The Billikens, led by second-year head coach Josh Schertz, played their home games at Chaifetz Arena as a member of the Atlantic 10 Conference.

== Previous season ==
The Billikens finished the 2024–25 season with a 19–15 record, going 11–7 in Atlantic 10 conference play and finishing in 5th place. The team won their first Atlantic 10 tournament game against Davidson 83–75 in the second round, before losing to Loyola Chicago 72–64 in the quarterfinals. The Billikens were invited to the NIT, where they lost to Arkansas State 103–78 in the first round.

== Preseason ==
On September 30, 2025, the Atlantic 10 Conference released their preseason poll. Saint Louis was picked to finish second in the conference, while receiving eleven first-place votes.

=== Preseason rankings ===
Atlantic 10 Preseason Poll
Place	Team	Votes
1	VCU	342 (11)
2	Saint Louis	341 (11)
3	Dayton	321 (3)
4	George Washington	296
5	Loyola Chicago	286 (2)
6	George Mason	254
7	Saint Joseph's	195
8	St. Bonaventure	185
9	Duquesne	155
10	Richmond	142
11	Davidson	107
12	Rhode Island	102
13	La Salle	56
14	Fordham	53
(#) first-place votes

=== Preseason All-Atlantic 10 Teams ===
Preseason All-Atlantic 10 Teams
Team	Player	Year	Position
First	Robbie Avila	Senior	Center

== Roster ==
2025–26 Saint Louis Billikens men's basketball team
Players
Coaches

Pos.	#	Name	Height	Weight	Year	Previous school	Hometown
G	0	Kellen Thames	6 ft 6 in (1.98 m)	210 lb (95 kg)	RS Jr	Pattonville High School	St. Louis, Missouri
G	1	Quentin Jones	6 ft 5 in (1.96 m)	180 lb (82 kg)	Jr	Northern Illinois	Chicago, Illinois
F	2	Badara Diakite	6 ft 9 in (2.06 m)	180 lb (82 kg)	Fr	South Kent School	Bamako, Mali
G	3	Trey Green	6 ft 0 in (1.83 m)	160 lb (73 kg)	RS So	Xavier	Charlotte, North Carolina
G	4	Amari McCottry	6 ft 6 in (1.98 m)	205 lb (93 kg)	So	St. Thomas More High School	Milwaukee, Wisconsin
G	5	Jaden Schertz (W)	5 ft 11 in (1.8 m)	165 lb (75 kg)	Jr	Indiana State	Harrogate, Tennessee
F	6	Kalu Anya	6 ft 8 in (2.03 m)	225 lb (102 kg)	Sr	Brown	Worcester, Massachusetts
F	9	Ishan Sharma	6 ft 5 in (1.96 m)	190 lb (86 kg)	So	Virginia	Milton, Ontario
F	11	Brady Dunlap	6 ft 7 in (2.01 m)	200 lb (91 kg)	RS So	St. John's	Studio City, California
G	12	Isaac Holmes (W)	6 ft 4 in (1.93 m)	215 lb (98 kg)	Jr	Apex High School	Apex, North Carolina
G	13	Dion Brown	6 ft 3 in (1.91 m)	180 lb (82 kg)	Sr	Boston College	Great Barrington, Massachusetts
G	14	Luke Laczkowski	6 ft 8 in (2.03 m)	185 lb (84 kg)	Fr	St. Mark's School of Texas	Dallas, Texas
F	15	Jax Kerr	6 ft 11 in (2.11 m)	200 lb (91 kg)	Fr	Owasso High School	Muskogee, Oklahoma
C	21	Robbie Avila	6 ft 10 in (2.08 m)	240 lb (109 kg)	Sr	Indiana State	Oak Forest, Illinois
G/F	24	Cam Hutson	6 ft 5 in (1.96 m)	190 lb (86 kg)	Fr	East Lansing High School	East Lansing, Michigan
F	25	Paul Otieno	6 ft 9 in (2.06 m)	230 lb (104 kg)	Sr	Quinnipiac	Nairobi, Kenya

Head coach

- Josh Schertz (Florida Atlantic)

Assistant coach(es)

- Zak Boisvert (Fordham)
- Antone Gray (Rhode Island College)
- Corey Tate (Missouri)
- Rob Gardiner (Wright State)
- Phil Gaetano (Sacred Heart)

Legend

- (C) Team captain
- (S) Suspended
- (I) Ineligible
- (W) Walk-on
- Injured
- Current redshirt

Roster
Last update: December 7, 2025

== Schedule and results ==
Date time, TV	Rank^{#}	Opponent^{#}	Result	Record	High points	High rebounds	High assists	Site (attendance) city, state
Exhibition
October 23, 2025*; 7:00 p.m.		at Bradley	W 98–77	–	19 – Thames	8 – Thames	– – –	Carver Arena; Peoria, IL
Non-conference regular season
November 3, 2025*; 7:00 p.m., FDMWX/ESPN+		Southeast Missouri State	W 92–67	1–0	18 – Avila	11 – Brown	3 – Thames	Chaifetz Arena (5,364); St. Louis, MO
November 6, 2025*; 7:00 p.m., FDMWX/ESPN+		Chicago State	W 108–86	2–0	16 – Sharma	6 – Green	3 – Thames	Chaifetz Arena (3,522); St. Louis, MO
November 10, 2025*; 7:00 p.m., ESPN+		Lindenwood	W 109–66	3–0	23 – McCottry	9 – McCottry	4 – Jones	Chaifetz Arena (3,710); St. Louis, MO
November 15, 2025*; 7:00 p.m., FDMW/ESPN+		Grand Canyon	W 78–64	4–0	20 – McCottry	15 – Brown	4 – McCottry	Chaifetz Arena (6,105); St. Louis, MO
November 21, 2025*; 7:00 p.m., ESPN+		Purdue Fort Wayne; Acrisure Series campus game	W 91–60	5–0	21 – Brown	10 – McCottry	5 – Avila	Chaifetz Arena (4,359); St. Louis, MO
November 27, 2025*; 6:00 p.m., CBSSN		vs. Santa Clara; Acrisure Invitational semifinal	W 71–70	6–0	21 – Green	8 – Thames	5 – Avila	Acrisure Arena; Palm Desert, CA
November 28, 2025*; 6:00 p.m., TruTV		vs. Stanford; Acrisure Invitational championship	L 77–78	6–1	15 – Green	8 – Avila	5 – McCottry	Acrisure Arena; Palm Desert, CA
December 2, 2025*; 9:00 p.m., ESPN+		at Loyola Marymount	W 91–70	7–1	23 – Green	11 – Thames	7 – Jones	Gersten Pavilion (908); Los Angeles, CA
December 7, 2025*; 2:00 p.m., ESPN+		Central Michigan	W 107−65	8−1	19 – Jones	6 – Sharma	5 – McCottry	Chaifetz Arena (4,446); St. Louis, MO
December 13, 2025*; 7:00 p.m., FDMW/ESPN+		San Francisco	W 85−75	9−1	18 – McCottry	11 – Brown	4 – Jones	Chaifetz Arena (5,814); St. Louis, MO
December 17, 2025*; 7:00 p.m., ESPN+		Bethune–Cookman	W 112−53	10−1	19 – Green	9 – Kerr	5 – Brown	Chaifetz Arena (4,097); St. Louis, MO
December 21, 2025*; 2:00 p.m., ESPN+		New Hampshire	W 93−79	11−1	18 – Tied	9 – Brown	6 – Avila	Chaifetz Arena (5,908); St. Louis, MO
December 28, 2025*; 2:00 p.m., ESPN+		Principia College (D-III)	W 114−33	12−1	15 – Brown	11 – Thames	5 – Sharma	Chaifetz Arena (5,274); St. Louis, MO
Atlantic 10 regular season
December 31, 2025; 3:00 p.m., FDMW/ESPN+		Saint Joseph's	W 102−79	13−1 (1–0)	20 – Avila	6 – Tied	8 – Avila	Chaifetz Arena (9,218); St. Louis, MO
January 7, 2026; 6:00 p.m., CBSSN		at VCU	W 71−62	14−1 (2–0)	18 – Thames	10 – Thames	3 – Thames	Siegel Center (7,637); Richmond, VA
January 10, 2026; 3:00 p.m., USA		at La Salle	W 84−72	15−1 (3–0)	18 – Avila	6 – Tied	5 – McCottry	John Glaser Arena (1,045); Philadelphia, PA
January 14, 2026; 7:00 p.m., FDMW/ESPN+		Fordham	W 78−56	16−1 (4–0)	16 – Thames	8 – McCottry	5 – Avila	Chaifetz Arena (6,620); St. Louis, MO
January 17, 2026; 3:00 p.m., CBSSN		Richmond	W 88−63	17−1 (5–0)	16 – Thames	8 – Brown	5 – Sharma	Chaifetz Arena (9,266); St. Louis, MO
January 20, 2026; 6:00 p.m., ESPN+	No. 24	at Duquesne	W 81−77	18−1 (6–0)	14 – Tied	7 – McCottry	6 – Avila	UPMC Cooper Fieldhouse (2,266); Pittsburgh, PA
January 23, 2026; 4:30 p.m., ESPN2	No. 24	at St. Bonaventure	W 97−62	19−1 (7–0)	29 – Sharma	7 – Otieno	5 – Avila	Reilly Center (4,023); St. Bonaventure, NY
January 27, 2026; 7:00 p.m., FDMWX/ESPN+	No. 21	George Washington	W 79−76	20−1 (8–0)	23 – Green	7 – Avila	5 – Avila	Chaifetz Arena (7,481); St. Louis, MO
January 30, 2026; 7:00 p.m., CBSSN	No. 21	Dayton	W 102–71	21–1 (9–0)	23 – Green	5 – Tied	5 – Jones	Chaifetz Arena (10,277); St. Louis, MO
February 3, 2026; 8:00 p.m., CBSSN	No. 19	at Davidson	W 91–82	22–1 (10–0)	22 – Dunlap	9 – McCottry	6 – Avila	John M. Belk Arena (2,523); Davidson, NC
February 7, 2026; 2:00 p.m., FDMW/ESPN+	No. 19	La Salle	W 82−58	23−1 (11–0)	15 – Sharma	6 – Jones	8 – Avila	Chaifetz Arena (9,874); St. Louis, MO
February 13, 2026; 7:30 p.m., ESPN2	No. 18	at Loyola Chicago	W 86−59	24−1 (12–0)	14 – Tied	7 – McCottry	6 – Avila	Joseph J. Gentile Arena (4,557); Chicago, IL
February 17, 2026; 6:00 p.m., ESPN+	No. 18	at Rhode Island	L 76−81	24−2 (12–1)	21 – Avila	6 – Tied	5 – McCottry	Ryan Center (5,331); Kingston, RI
February 20, 2026; 6:00 p.m., ESPN2	No. 18	VCU	W 88−75	25−2 (13–1)	16 – Thames	8 – Otieno	3 – Tied	Chaifetz Arena (10,223); St. Louis, MO
February 24, 2026; 6:00 p.m., FDMW/ESPN+	No. 23	at Dayton	L 62−77	25–3 (13–2)	24 – Thames	7 – Tied	3 – Sharma	UD Arena (13,407); Dayton, OH
February 28, 2026; 7:00 p.m., FDMWX/ESPN+	No. 23	Duquesne	W 91−76	26−3 (14–2)	23 – Avila	7 – Avila	7 – Avila	Chaifetz Arena (9,937); St. Louis, MO
March 4, 2026; 7:00 p.m., CBSSN	No. 25	Loyola Chicago	W 79−65	27−3 (15–2)	18 – McCottry	6 – Avila	5 – Otieno	Chaifetz Arena; St. Louis, MO
March 7, 2026; 3:00 p.m., USA	No. 25	at George Mason	L 57−86	27−4 (15−3)	13 – Brown	5 – Tied	4 – Jones	EagleBank Arena (6,461); Fairfax, VA
A-10 tournament
March 13, 2026; 10:30 a.m., USA	(1)	vs. (9) George Washington; Quarterfinal	W 88–81	28–4	22 – Avila	7 – Brown	4 – Tied	PPG Paints Arena; Pittsburgh, PA
March 14, 2026; 12:00 p.m., CBSSN	(1)	vs. (4) Dayton; Semifinal	L 69–70	28–5	16 – McCottry	9 – Avila	5 – McCottry	PPG Paints Arena; Pittsburgh, PA
NCAA tournament
March 19, 2026*; 8:45 p.m., CBS	(9 MW)	vs. (8 MW) Georgia; First round	W 102–77	29–5	18 – Brown	9 – McCottry	5 – Tied	KeyBank Center (17,213); Buffalo, NY
March 21, 2026*; 11:10 a.m., CBS	(9 MW)	vs. (1 MW) No. 3 Michigan; Second round	L 72–95	29–6	14 – McCottry	5 – Tied	5 – Avila	KeyBank Center (17,499); Buffalo, NY
*Non-conference game. ^{#}Rankings from AP poll. (#) Tournament seedings in parentheses. MW=Midwest. All times are in Central Time.

== Rankings ==
Ranking movements Legend: ██ Increase in ranking ██ Decrease in ranking — = Not ranked RV = Received votes
	Week																				
Poll	Pre	1	2	3	4	5	6	7	8	9	10	11	12	13	14	15	16	17	18	19	Final
AP	—	—	—	—	—	—	RV	RV	RV*	RV	RV	24	21	19	18	18	23	25	RV	RV	RV
Coaches	—	—	RV	RV	—	—	RV	RV	RV	RV	RV	23	22	20	19	19	24	24	RV	RV	RV

*AP did not release a week 8 poll.
