= Isaiah Swope =

American basketball player (born 2003)

No. 1 – Fraport Skyliners
- Position: Shooting guard
- League: Basketball Bundesliga; EuroCup

Personal information
- Born: April 22, 2003 (age 23) Newburgh, Indiana, U.S.
- Listed height: 5 ft 10 in (1.78 m)
- Listed weight: 170 lb (77 kg)

Career information
- High school: Castle (Newburgh, Indiana)
- College: Southern Indiana (2021–2023); Indiana State (2023–2024); Saint Louis (2024–2025)
- NBA draft: 2025: undrafted
- Playing career: 2025–present

Career history
- 2025–present: Fraport Skyliners

Career highlights
- First-team All-OVC (2023); Second-team All-MVC (2024); Third-team All-Atlantic 10 (2025); MVC All-Newcomer team (2024)

Isaiah Swope (born April 22, 2003) is an American professional basketball player for Skyliners Frankfurt of the Basketball Bundesliga (BBL) and the EuroCup. He played college basketball for the Saint Louis Billikens, Southern Indiana Screaming Eagles and Indiana State Sycamores. He is a 5-foot-10-inch (1.78 m) shooting guard.

== High school career ==
Swope attended John H. Castle High School in Newburgh, Indiana. As a junior, he averaged over 20 points and five rebounds per game. After averaging 22.2 points, 3.9 assists, and 3.8 rebounds per game as a senior, he committed to play college basketball at the University of Southern Indiana.

== College career ==
Swope scored a then-career-high 28 points in an 88–85 overtime win over Indiana State on December 11, 2022. He finished his sophomore season averaging 15.6 points, 3.4 assists, and 2.4 rebounds, being named to the first-team All-OVC, before entering the transfer portal.

In April 2023, Swope announced that he would be transferring to Indiana State University to play for the Indiana State Sycamores. In his first season at Indiana State, Swope made an immediate impact. Against UIC on January 24, 2024, he scored a career-high 30 points in an 89–83 victory. Swope entered the transfer portal for a second time following the season.

On April 22, 2024, Swope announced that he would be transferring to Saint Louis University to play for the Saint Louis Billikens, following his former Sycamores head coach Josh Schertz. He averaged 17.1 points and 3.2 rebounds per game and was named to the Third-team All-Atlantic 10.

== Professional career ==
On July 31, 2025, he signed with Skyliners Frankfurt of the Basketball Bundesliga (BBL).

== Career statistics ==
Legend
GP	Games played	GS	Games started	MPG	Minutes per game
FG%	Field goal percentage	3P%	3-point field goal percentage	FT%	Free throw percentage
RPG	Rebounds per game	APG	Assists per game	SPG	Steals per game
BPG	Blocks per game	PPG	Points per game	**Bold**	Career high

=== College ===
Year	Team	GP	GS	MPG	FG%	3P%	FT%	RPG	APG	SPG	BPG	PPG
2022–23	Southern Indiana	33	31	31.9	.463	.423	.745	2.4	3.5	1.4	.0	15.6
2023–24	Indiana State	37	37	33.4	.433	.362	.736	3.0	2.1	1.3	.0	15.9
2024–25	Saint Louis	33	33	36.7	.433	.359	.756	3.2	4.2	1.1	.1	17.1
