= 2025–26 Dayton Flyers men's basketball team =

American college basketball season

2025–26 Dayton Flyers men's basketball

NIT, Quarterfinals
- Conference: Atlantic 10 Conference
- Record: 25–12 (12–6 A–10)
- Head coach: Anthony Grant (9th season)
- Associate head coach: Ricardo Greer (9th season)
- Assistant coaches: James Kane (6th season); Jermaine Henderson (3rd season); Sean Damaska (3rd season)
- Home arena: UD Arena

2025–26 Atlantic 10 men's basketball standings
	Conf.				Overall
Team	W		L	PCT	W		L	PCT
Saint Louis	15	–	3	.833	29	–	6	.829
VCU †	15	–	3	.833	28	–	8	.778
Saint Joseph's	13	–	5	.722	24	–	12	.667
Dayton	12	–	6	.667	25	–	12	.676
George Mason	11	–	7	.611	23	–	10	.697
Davidson	10	–	8	.556	20	–	14	.588
Duquesne	9	–	9	.500	18	–	15	.545
Fordham	8	–	10	.444	17	–	15	.531
George Washington	8	–	10	.444	19	–	16	.543
Rhode Island	7	–	11	.389	16	–	16	.500
Richmond	5	–	13	.278	15	–	17	.469
La Salle	5	–	13	.278	9	–	23	.281
St. Bonaventure	4	–	14	.222	17	–	17	.500
Loyola Chicago	4	–	14	.222	9	–	24	.273
† 2026 A-10 tournament winner

The 2025–26 Dayton Flyers men's basketball team represented the University of Dayton in the 2025–26 NCAA Division I men's basketball season. They were led by head coach Anthony Grant in his ninth season with the Flyers. The Flyers played their home games at UD Arena in Dayton, Ohio as members of the Atlantic 10 Conference (A-10).

== Previous season ==
The Flyers finished the 2024–25 season 23–11, 12–6 in A-10 play to finish in third place. They lost in the quarterfinals of the A-10 tournament to St Joseph's. They received an at-large bid to the National Invitational Tournament as the No. 1 seed in the Dayton Region where they defeated Florida Atlantic in the first round before losing to eventual NIT champion Chattanooga in the second round. Despite Dayton being the top seed in the region, both NIT games were played at opponents' campus sites due to UD Arena hosting NCAA opening round games and the Ohio High School Athletic Association boys basketball championship.

== Offseason ==
=== Departures ===
Name	Number	Pos.	Height	Weight	Year	Hometown	Reason for departure
Posh Alexander	5	G	6'0"	205	(redshirt) Senior	Brooklyn, NY	Graduated
Marvell Allen	8	G	6'4"	205	(redshirt) Freshman	Fort Lauderdale, FL	Transferred to Utah Tech
Enoch Cheeks	6	G	6'3"	195	Senior	Providence, RI	Graduated
Isaac Jack	13	F/C	6'11"	250	Junior	Port Alberni, BC	Transferred to Pacific
Hamad Mousa	10	G/F	6'8"	190	Freshman	Doha, Qatar	Transferred to Cal Poly
Nate Santos	2	F	6'7"	215	Senior	Geneva, IL	Graduated
Atticus Schuler	54	G/F	6'6"	200	Sophomore	Westerville, OH	Walk on; left team
Malachi Smith	11	G	6'0"	175	(redshirt) Junior	The Bronx, NY	Transferred to UConn
Brady Uhl	21	G	6'2"	205	Senior	Dayton, OH	Graduated
Zed Key	23	F	6'8"	245	GS Senior	Bay Shore, NY	Graduated

=== Incoming transfers ===
Name	Number	Pos.	Height	Weight	Year	Hometown	Previous school
Jordan Derkack	4	G	6'5"	212	Senior	Colonia, NJ	Rutgers
Bryce Heard	10	G	6'6"	205	Sophomore	Chicago, IL	NC State
Keonte Jones	7	F	6'6"	203	Graduate Student	Madison, WI	Cal State Northridge
De'Shayne Montgomery	2	G	6'4"	200	Junior	Ft Lauderdale, FL	Georgia
Adam Njie Jr.	5	G	6'2"	175	Sophomore	The Bronx, NY	Iona
Malcom Thomas	1	F	6'8"	220	(redshirt) Freshman	Mitchellville, MD	Villanova

=== Recruiting classes ===
==== 2025 recruiting class ====
College recruiting
Name	Hometown	School	Height	Weight	Commit date
Jaron McKie #17 PG	Philadelphia, PA	St. Joseph's Prep School	6 ft 2 in (1.88 m)	180 lb (82 kg)	Sep 14, 2024
Jaron McKie #17 PG	Recruit ratings: Rivals: 247Sports: ESPN: (82)				
Damon Friery #21 PF	Cleveland, OH	Saint Ignatius High School	6 ft 9 in (2.06 m)	205 lb (93 kg)	Sep 9, 2024
Damon Friery #21 PF	Recruit ratings: Rivals: 247Sports: ESPN: (81)				
Overall recruit ranking:
Note: In many cases, Scout, Rivals, 247Sports, On3, and ESPN may conflict in their listings of height and weight.; In these cases, the average was taken. ESPN grades are on a 100-point scale.; Sources: "Dayton 2025 Basketball Commitments". Rivals.; "Dayton Flyers 2025 Player Commits". ESPN.; "2025 Team Ranking". Rivals.

==== 2026 recruiting class ====
College recruiting (2026)
Name	Hometown	School	Height	Weight	Commit date
Julian Washington #67 SG	Castalia, OH	Margaretta	6 ft 4 in (1.93 m)	170 lb (77 kg)	Oct 24, 2025
Julian Washington #67 SG	Recruit ratings: Rivals: 247Sports: ESPN: (NR)				
Overall recruit ranking:
Note: In many cases, Scout, Rivals, 247Sports, On3, and ESPN may conflict in their listings of height and weight.; In these cases, the average was taken. ESPN grades are on a 100-point scale.; Sources: "Dayton 2026 Basketball Commitments". Rivals.; "Dayton Flyers 2026 Player Commits". ESPN.; "2026 Team Ranking". Rivals.

== Roster ==
2025–26 Dayton Flyers men's basketball team
Players
Coaches

Pos.	#	Name	Height	Weight	Year	Previous school	Hometown
G	0	Javon Bennett	5 ft 10 in (1.78 m)	165 lb (75 kg)	Sr	Merrimack	Orlando, FL
F	1	Malcom Thomas	6 ft 8 in (2.03 m)	220 lb (100 kg)	RS Fr	DeMatha	Mitchellville, MD
G	2	De'Shayne Montgomery	6 ft 4 in (1.93 m)	200 lb (91 kg)	Jr	Hargrave Military Academy	Ft Lauderdale, FL
F	3	Jaiun Simon	6 ft 6 in (1.98 m)	225 lb (102 kg)	RS So	Pebblebrook High School	Mableton, GA
G	4	Jordan Derkack	6 ft 5 in (1.96 m)	220 lb (100 kg)	Sr	Colonia	Colonia, NJ
G	5	Adam Njie Jr. (S)	6 ft 2 in (1.88 m)	175 lb (79 kg)	So	Cardinal Hayes	The Bronx, NY
F	7	Keonte Jones	6 ft 6 in (1.98 m)	203 lb (92 kg)	GS	Cal State Northridge	Madison, WI
G	8	Jaron McKie	6 ft 3 in (1.91 m)	180 lb (82 kg)	Fr	St Joseph's Prep	Gladwyne, PA
G	10	Bryce Heard	6 ft 6 in (1.98 m)	205 lb (93 kg)	So	NC State	Chicago
G	11	Evan Dickey (W)	6 ft 3 in (1.91 m)	200 lb (91 kg)	Jr	Chaminade Julienne High School	Dayton, OH
F	22	Damon Friery	6 ft 9 in (2.06 m)	205 lb (93 kg)	Fr	St Ignatius	Cleveland, OH
F	24	Jacob Conner	6 ft 10 in (2.08 m)	225 lb (102 kg)	Sr	Marshall	Dayton, OH
G	25	Will Maxwell (W)	6 ft 4 in (1.93 m)	210 lb (95 kg)	Jr	Oakwood High School	Oakwood, OH
F	29	Amaël L'Etang	7 ft 1 in (2.16 m)	235 lb (107 kg)	So	Cholet	Toulouse, France
G	33	Makai Grant (W)	6 ft 1 in (1.85 m)	195 lb (88 kg)	Jr	Chaminade Julienne High School	Dayton, OH
G	50	Sean Pouedet	6 ft 2 in (1.88 m)	190 lb (86 kg)	Fr	Topsportschool Antwerpen	Machelen, Belgium

Head coach

- Anthony Grant (Dayton)

Assistant coach(es)

- Ricardo Greer (Pittsburgh)
- James Kane (Florida)
- Jermaine Henderson (Miami (OH))
- Sean Damaska (Northern Illinois)

Legend

- (C) Team captain
- (S) Suspended
- (I) Ineligible
- (W) Walk-on
- Injured
- Current redshirt

Roster

== Schedule and results ==
Date time, TV	Rank^{#}	Opponent^{#}	Result	Record	High points	High rebounds	High assists	Site (attendance) city, state
Exhibition
October 19, 2025*; 2:00 p.m., FDSNOH		Penn State; CareSource Exhibition Game	W 78–62	–	17 – Jones	7 – L'Etang	5 – L'Etang	UD Arena (13,407); Dayton, OH
October 27, 2025*; 7:00 p.m.		Bowling Green	W 90–59	–	25 – Bennett	8 – Tied	6 – Montgomery	UD Arena (13,407); Dayton, OH
Non-conference regular season
November 3, 2025*; 7:00 p.m., ESPN+		Canisius	W 88–48	1–0	20 – Bennett	6 – L'Etang	5 – Montgomery	UD Arena (13,407); Dayton, OH
November 8, 2025*; 2:00 p.m., FDSNOH		UMBC	W 77–71	2–0	16 – Bennett	6 – Montgomery	7 – Bennett	UD Arena (13,407) {{{site_cityst}}}
November 11, 2025*; 7:00 p.m., ESPN+		at Cincinnati; Twyman-Stokes Classic	L 62–74	2–1	14 – L'Etang	8 – Tied	4 – Derkack	Fifth Third Arena (11,815); Cincinnati, OH
November 15, 2025*; 7:30 p.m., WHIO-TV/ESPN+		Bethune–Cookman	W 91–82	3–1	25 – Bennett	10 – L'Etang	6 – Derkack	UD Arena (13,407); Dayton, OH
November 19, 2025*; 7:30 p.m., TruTV		at Marquette	W 77–71 ^{OT}	4–1	19 – Bennett	8 – L'Etang	5 – Derkack	Fiserv Forum (14,369); Milwaukee, WI
November 22, 2025*; 2:00 p.m., ESPN+		North Carolina Central	W 74–55	5–1	15 – Carvey	7 – Lattimore	5 – Johnson	UD Arena (13,407); Dayton, OH
November 27, 2025*; 7:30 p.m., ESPN2		vs. Georgetown; ESPN Events Invitational Magic Bracket Semifinal	W 84–79 ^{OT}	6–1	18 – L'Etang	8 – Derkack	4 – Tied	State Farm Field House (4,276); Kissimmee, FL
November 28, 2025*; 9:30 p.m., ESPN		vs. No. 9 BYU; ESPN Events Invitational Magic Bracket Final	L 79–83	6–2	22 – Bennett	8 – Montgomery	4 – Tied	State Farm Field House (4,135); Kissimmee, FL
December 2, 2025*; 7:00 p.m., ESPN+		East Tennessee State	W 88–71	7–2	27 – Montgomery	7 – Montgomery	5 – Tied	UD Arena (13,407); Dayton, OH
December 6, 2025*; 12:00 p.m., ESPN2		vs. Virginia	L 73–86	7–3	18 – Bennett	5 – Tied	3 – Montgomery	Spectrum Center (4,175); Charlotte, NC
December 13, 2025*; 7:00 p.m., WHIO-TV		North Florida	W 84–61	8–3	23 – Montgomery	14 – L'Etang	5 – Derkack	UD Arena (13,407); Dayton, OH
December 16, 2025*; 7:00 p.m., CBSSN		Florida State	W 97–69	9–3	25 – Bennett	9 – Derkack	4 – Jones	UD Arena (13,407); Dayton, OH
December 20, 2025*; 12:30 p.m., USA		Liberty	L 61–64	9–4	19 – L'Etang	15 – Jones	4 – Jones	UD Arena (13,407); Dayton, OH
Atlantic 10 regular season
December 31, 2025; 2:00 p.m., ESPN+		Fordham	W 63–56	10–4 (1–0)	15 – Derkack	14 – Derkack	3 – Tied	UD Arena (13,407); Dayton, OH
January 3, 2026; 2:00 p.m., CBSSN		at Loyola Chicago	W 70–68	11–4 (2–0)	24 – Bennett	7 – Conner	4 – Bennett	Joseph J. Gentile Arena (3,777); Chicago, IL
January 6, 2026; 8:00 p.m., CBSSN		George Washington	W 79–72	12–4 (3–0)	20 – Bennett	9 – Simon	3 – Tied	UD Arena (13,407); Dayton, OH
January 13, 2026; 7:00 p.m., ESPN+		at Duquesne	W 71–65	13–4 (4–0)	15 – Jones	6 – Tied	5 – Conner	UPMC Cooper Fieldhouse (2,956); Pittsburgh, PA
January 16, 2026; 8:30 p.m., ESPN2		Loyola Chicago	W 78–51	14–4 (5–0)	21 – Montgomery	9 – Jones	4 – Bennett	UD Arena (13,407); Dayton, OH
January 21, 2026; 6:30 p.m., ESPN+		at La Salle	L 64–67	14–5 (5–1)	14 – Jones	10 – Jones	5 – Bennett	John Glaser Arena (1,330); Philadelphia, PA
January 24, 2026; 6:00 p.m., CBSSN		at Saint Joseph's	L 74–81	14–6 (5–2)	18 – Bennett	7 – Heard	4 – Heard	Hagan Arena (3,047); Philadelphia, PA
January 27, 2026; 7:00 p.m., Spectrum News 1		Rhode Island	L 76–81 ^{OT}	14–7 (5–3)	15 – Heard	7 – Jones	7 – Bennett	UD Arena (13,407); Dayton, OH
January 30, 2026; 8:00 p.m., CBSSN		at No. 21 Saint Louis	L 71–102	14–8 (5–4)	23 – Montgomery	6 – L'Etang	5 – Bennett	Chaifetz Arena (10,277); St. Louis, MO
February 3, 2026; 7:00 p.m., CBSSN		St. Bonaventure	W 72−70	15−8 (6−4)	20 – Bennett	5 – Derkack	3 – Conner	UD Arena (13,407); Dayton, OH
February 6, 2026; 7:00 p.m., ESPN2		at VCU	L 73−99	15–9 (6–5)	15 – Tied	13 – L'Etang	3 – Bennett	Siegel Center (7,637); Richmond, VA
February 15, 2026; 4:00 p.m., ESPN2		Davidson	W 70–59	16–9 (7–5)	13 – Montgomery	13 – Simon	6 – Jones	UD Arena (13,407); Dayton, OH
February 18, 2026; 7:00 p.m., CBSSN		at George Mason	W 82–67	17–9 (8–5)	22 – Bennett	7 – Simon	5 – Derkack	EagleBank Arena (4,042); Fairfax, VA
February 21, 2026; 2:00 p.m., WHIO-TV		Duquesne	W 78–66	18–9 (9–5)	17 – L'Etang	10 – L'Etang	5 – L'Etang	UD Arena (13,407); Dayton, OH
February 24, 2026; 7:00 p.m., FDSNOH		No. 23 Saint Louis	W 77–62	19–9 (10–5)	26 – L'Etang	10 – L'Etang	5 – Montgomery	UD Arena (13,407); Dayton, OH
February 27, 2026; 7:00 p.m., ESPN2		at George Washington	W 68–66	20–9 (11–5)	25 – Bennett	4 – Tied	4 – Bennett	Charles E. Smith Center (3,703); Washington, D.C.
March 3, 2026; 7:00 p.m., ESPN+		at Richmond	W 65–60	21–9 (12–5)	15 – Montgomery	8 – Jones	4 – L'Etang	Robins Center (4,658); Richmond, VA
March 6, 2026; 7:00 p.m., ESPN2		VCU	L 62–68	21–10 (12–6)	17 – Bennett	10 – Montgomery	3 – Jones	UD Arena (13,407); Dayton, OH
A-10 tournament
March 13, 2026; 2:00 p.m., USA	(4)	vs. (13) St. Bonaventure; Quarterfinals	W 68–63	22–10	27 – Bennett	12 – L'Etang	4 – Jones	PPG Paints Arena (7,145); Pittsburgh, PA
March 14, 2026; 1:00 p.m., CBSSN	(4)	vs. (1) Saint Louis; Semifinals	W 70–69	23–10	28 – Derkack	7 – Montgomery	4 – L'Etang	PPG Paints Arena; Pittsburgh, PA
March 15, 2026; 1:00 p.m., CBS	(4)	vs. (2) VCU; Championship	L 62–70	23–11	14 – Bennett	10 – Derkack	4 – Derkack	PPG Paints Arena (9,114); Pittsburgh, PA
NIT
March 18, 2026*; 9:00 p.m., ESPNU	(2 WS)	at Bradley; First round	W 80–66	24–11	25 – Bennett	8 – L'Etang	5 – Derkack	Carver Arena (Note: Dayton traveled to Peoria, Illinois to play an away game due to the NCAA Division I Men's Basketball Tournament First Four taking place at UD Arena.) (2,436); Peoria, IL
March 21, 2026*; 7:00 p.m., ESPNU	(2 WS)	at UNC Wilmington; Second round	W 80–61	25–11	20 – Montgomery	13 – Derkack	4 – Bennett	Trask Coliseum (Note: Dayton traveled to Wilmington, North Carolina to play an away game due to the OHSAA Boys Basketball State Championships taking place at UD Arena.) (5,038); Wilmington, NC
March 25, 2026*; 7:00 p.m., ESPN2	(2 WS)	(4 WS) Illinois State; Quarterfinals	L 55–61	25–12	12 – Heard	6 – Tied	2 – Tied	UD Arena (10,444); Dayton, OH
*Non-conference game. ^{#}Rankings from AP poll. (#) Tournament seedings in parentheses. WS=Winston-Salem. All times are in Eastern Time.
