= List of Indiana State Sycamores men's basketball head coaches =

The following is a list of Indiana State Sycamores men's basketball head coaches. There have been 26 head coaches of the Sycamores in their 124-season history.

Indiana State's current head coach is Josh Schertz. He was hired as the Sycamores' head coach in March 2021, replacing Greg Lansing, who was fired after the 2020–21 season.

| No. | Tenure | Coach | Years | Record | Pct. |
|---|---|---|---|---|---|
| 1 | 1899–1908; 1909–1911 | John Kimmell | 11 | 28–72 | .280 |
| 2 | 1908–1909 | Eddy Conners | 1 | 2–7 | .222 |
| 3 | 1911–1912 | Bertram Wiggins | 1 | 7–6 | .538 |
| 4 | 1912–1917 | Alfred Westphal | 5 | 47–23 | .671 |
| 5 | 1917–1918 | O. E. Sink | 1 | 8–8 | .500 |
| 6 | 1918–1923 | Birch Bayh | 5 | 57–24 | .704 |
| 7 | 1923–1924 | Arthur L. Strum | 1 | 16–7 | .696 |
| 8 | 1924–1927; 1932–1933 | David Glascock | 4 | 33–32 | .508 |
| 9 | 1927–1931; 1933–1938 | Wally Marks | 9 | 90–58 | .608 |
| 10 | 1931–1932 | J. Roy Goodland | 1 | 10–5 | .667 |
| 11 | 1938–1946 | Glenn M. Curtis | 8 | 122–45 | .731 |
| 12 | 1946–1948 | John Wooden | 2 | 44–15 | .746 |
| 13 | 1948–1954 (Note: Longfellow resigned after seven games of the 1954–55 season. Paul Wolf served as interim coach for the remainder of the season.) | John Longfellow | 7 | 122–64 | .656 |
| 14 | 1954–1955* | Paul Wolf | 1 | 7–10 | .412 |
| 15 | 1955–1967 | Duane Klueh | 12 | 182–122 | .599 |
| 16 | 1967–1975 | Gordon C. Stauffer | 8 | 121–94 | .563 |
| 17 | 1975–1978 | Bob King | 3 | 61–24 | .718 |
| 18 | 1978–1982 | Bill Hodges | 4 | 67–48 | .583 |
| 19 | 1982–1985 | Dave Schellhase | 3 | 37–48 | .435 |
| 20 | 1985–1989 | Ron Greene | 4 | 31–82 | .274 |
| 21 | 1989–1994 | Tates Locke | 5 | 50–88 | .362 |
| 22 | 1994–1997 | Sherman Dillard | 3 | 29–51 | .363 |
| 23 | 1997–2007 | Royce Waltman | 10 | 134–165 | .448 |
| 24 | 2007–2010 | Kevin McKenna | 3 | 43–52 | .453 |
| 25 | 2010–2021 | Greg Lansing | 11 | 181–164 | .525 |
| 26 | 2021–2024 | Josh Schertz | 3 | 66–40 | .623 |
| Totals | | 26 coaches | 124 seasons | 1,584–1,329 | .544 |
Records updated through end of 2023–24 season * - Denotes interim head coach. Source
