= 2024–25 Duquesne Dukes men's basketball team =

American college basketball season

2024–25 Duquesne Dukes men's basketball
- Conference: Atlantic 10 Conference
- Record: 13–19 (8–10 A–10)
- Head coach: Dru Joyce III (1st season)
- Assistant coaches: Rick McFadden; Julian Sullinger; Steve Wright; Ari Stern; Chase Goldstein
- Home arena: UPMC Cooper Fieldhouse

2024–25 Atlantic 10 men's basketball standings
	Conf.				Overall
Team	W		L	PCT	W		L	PCT
VCU †	15	–	3	.833	28	–	7	.800
George Mason	15	–	3	.833	27	–	9	.750
Dayton	12	–	6	.667	23	–	11	.676
Loyola Chicago	12	–	6	.667	25	–	12	.676
Saint Louis	11	–	7	.611	19	–	15	.559
Saint Joseph's	11	–	7	.611	22	–	13	.629
George Washington	9	–	9	.500	21	–	13	.618
St. Bonaventure	9	–	9	.500	22	–	12	.647
Duquesne	8	–	10	.444	13	–	19	.406
Rhode Island	7	–	11	.389	18	–	13	.581
UMass	7	–	11	.389	12	–	20	.375
Davidson	6	–	12	.333	17	–	16	.515
Richmond	5	–	13	.278	10	–	22	.313
La Salle	5	–	13	.278	14	–	19	.424
Fordham	3	–	15	.167	12	–	21	.364
† 2025 A-10 tournament winner

The 2024–25 Duquesne Dukes men's basketball team represented Duquesne University during the 2024–25 NCAA Division I men's basketball season. The Dukes, led by first-year head coach Dru Joyce III, played their home games at the UPMC Cooper Fieldhouse in Pittsburgh, Pennsylvania as a member of the Atlantic 10 Conference (A-10).

== Previous season ==
The Dukes finished the 2023–24 season 25–12, 10–8 in A-10 play, to finish in sixth place. They defeated Saint Louis, Dayton, St. Bonaventure and VCU to win the A-10 tournament championship. As a result, they received the conference's automatic bid to the NCAA tournament marking the sixth trip to the NCAA tournament in school history and first since 1977. As the No. 11 seed in the East Region, they upset BYU in the first round before losing in the second round to Illinois.

After winning the A-10 tournament championship, head coach Keith Dambrot announced that he would retire following the season. Dambrot had spent seven years as head coach of the Dukes. On March 28, 2024, the school named associate head coach Dru Joyce III the team's new head coach.

== Offseason ==
=== Departures ===
Name	Number	Pos.	Height	Weight	Year	Hometown	Reason for departure
Dusan Mahorcic	0	F	6' 10"	235	GS Senior	Belgrade, Serbia	Graduated
Jimmy Clark III	1	G	6' 3"	185	(redshirt) Senior	Covington, GA	Graduated
Dae Dae Grant	3	G	6' 2"	185	Senior	Lorain, OH	Graduated
Tre Williams	4	C	6' 7"	250	(redshirt) Senior	Reynoldsburg, OH	Graduated
Andy Barba	22	F	6' 6"	200	Junior	Cleveland, OH	Transferred to Case Western Reserve
Andrei Savrasov	23	F	6' 7"	225	GS Senior	Saint Petersburg, Russia	Graduated
Hassan Drame	33	F	6' 7"	200	GS Senior	Bamako, Mali	Graduated
Fousseyni Drame	34	F	6' 7"	200	GS Senior	Bamako, Mali	Graduated
Kailon Nicholls	55	G	6' 0"	160	Freshman	Toronto, ON	Transferred to Northern Illinois

=== Incoming transfers ===
Name	Number	Pos.	Height	Weight	Year	Hometown	Previous school
Tre Dinkins	0	G	6' 2"	190	Senior	Chester, PA	Canisius
Cameron Crawford	1	G	6' 5"	192	(redshirt) Junior	Hoover, AL	Marshall
Jahsean Corbett	4	G	6' 7"	210	Senior	Orlando, FL	Chicago State
Alex Williams	6	F	6' 5"	235	Senior	Xenia, OH	Furman
Maximus Edwards	8	G	6' 5"	215	(redshirt) Junior	Stratford, CT	George Washington
Lucas Prolla	22	G	6' 2"		Sophomore	Porto Alegre, Brazil	Missouri State–Western Plains
Eli Wilborn	25	F	6' 8"	215	Sophomore	Middletown, CT	Saint Francis (PA)
Brandon Hall	55	G	6' 4'		Junior	Chicago, IL	Howard College

=== 2024 recruiting class ===
There were no incoming recruits for the class of 2024.

=== 2025 recruiting class ===
College recruiting information (2025)
Name	Hometown	School	Height	Weight	Commit date
Arness Lawson #29 PG	Pickerington, OH	Pickerington North High School	6 ft 1 in (1.85 m)	165 lb (75 kg)	Sep 19, 2024
Arness Lawson #29 PG	Recruit ratings: Rivals: 247Sports: ESPN: (79)				
Dom Aekins; PG	Columbus, OH	Walnut Ridge High School	5 ft 8 in (1.73 m)	N/A	Jul 19, 2024
Dom Aekins; PG	Recruit ratings: Rivals: 247Sports: ESPN: (NR)				
Overall recruit ranking:
Note: In many cases, Scout, Rivals, 247Sports, On3, and ESPN may conflict in their listings of height and weight.; In these cases, the average was taken. ESPN grades are on a 100-point scale.; Sources: "2025 Team Ranking". Rivals.

== Roster ==
2024–25 Duquesne Dukes men's basketball team
Players
Coaches

Pos.	#	Name	Height	Weight	Year	Previous school	Hometown
G	0	Tre Dinkins III	6 ft 2 in (1.88 m)	190 lb (86 kg)	Sr	Cardinal O'Hara; Canisius	Chester, PA
G	1	Cam Crawford	6 ft 5 in (1.96 m)	200 lb (91 kg)	RS Jr	Spain Park; Marshall	Birmingham, AL
F	2	David Dixon	6 ft 9 in (2.06 m)	215 lb (98 kg)	Jr	Speights Academy (FL)	Memphis, TN
G	3	Kareem Rozier	5 ft 9 in (1.75 m)	160 lb (73 kg)	Jr	St. Mary's Prep	Detroit, MI
G/F	4	Jahsean Corbett	6 ft 6 in (1.98 m)	210 lb (95 kg)	Sr	West Oaks Academy (FL); Chicago State	Orlando, FL
F	5	Halil Barre	6 ft 9 in (2.06 m)	225 lb (102 kg)	Jr	Scotland Campus (PA)	Cotonou, Benin
F	6	Alex Williams	6 ft 5 in (1.96 m)	235 lb (107 kg)	Sr	Archbishop Moeller; Furman	Dayton, OH
F	7	Jakub Necas	6 ft 8 in (2.03 m)	210 lb (95 kg)	So	Gymnázium Blansko	Blansko, Czech Republic
G	8	Maximus Edwards	6 ft 5 in (1.96 m)	215 lb (98 kg)	RS Jr	Our Saviour Lutheran (NY); George Washington	Stratford, CT
F	14	Matúš Hronský	6 ft 8 in (2.03 m)	205 lb (93 kg)	Jr	Wasatch Academy (UT)	Poruba, Slovakia
G	22	Lucas Prolla	6 ft 2 in (1.88 m)	170 lb (77 kg)	So	Corinthians U18; Missouri State–Western Plains	Porto Alegre, Brazil
F	23	Jayden Brown (W)	6 ft 6 in (1.98 m)	175 lb (79 kg)	Fr	St. Andrew's Episcopal	Upper Marlboro, MD
F	25	Eli Wilborn	6 ft 8 in (2.03 m)	215 lb (98 kg)	So	South Kent School; Saint Francis (PA)	Middletown, CT
G	30	Lucas Perusek (W)	6 ft 1 in (1.85 m)	175 lb (79 kg)	So	St. Edward	Willoughby Hills, OH
G	31	Seamus McDermott (W)	6 ft 2 in (1.88 m)	185 lb (84 kg)	So	Holy Ghost Prep	Holland, PA
G	32	Ethan Anish (W)	6 ft 1 in (1.85 m)	170 lb (77 kg)	So	Taylor Allderdice	Pittsburgh, PA
G	44	Jake DiMichele (W)	6 ft 4 in (1.93 m)	185 lb (84 kg)	So	First Love Christian Academy	McKees Rocks, PA
G	55	Brandon Hall	6 ft 4 in (1.93 m)	190 lb (86 kg)	Jr	Thoronton Township; Howard College	Chicago, IL

Head coach

- Dru Joyce III (Akron)

Assistant coach(es)

- Rick McFadden (Akron)
- Julian Sullinger (Kent State)
- Steve Wright (Bowling Green)
- Ari Stern (The College of Wooster)
- Chase Goldstein (Florida Gulf Coast)

Legend

- (C) Team captain
- (S) Suspended
- (I) Ineligible
- (W) Walk-on
- Injured
- Current redshirt

Roster
Last update: February 9, 2025

== Schedule and results ==
Date time, TV	Rank^{#}	Opponent^{#}	Result	Record	High points	High rebounds	High assists	Site (attendance) city, state
Non-conference regular season
November 4, 2024*; 8:00 p.m., ESPN+		Lipscomb	L 72–77	0–1	16 – Dinkins	9 – Edwards	2 – 3 tied	UPMC Cooper Fieldhouse (2,274); Pittsburgh, PA
November 8, 2024*; 8:30 p.m.		vs. Princeton; Jersey Jam	L 68–75	0–2	14 – Rozier	9 – Corbett	4 – Rozier	CURE Insurance Arena (2,247); Newark, NJ
November 15, 2024*; 9:00 p.m., FS2		at DePaul	L 58–84	0–3	13 – Edwards	4 – 2 tied	4 – Necas	Wintrust Arena (3,303); Chicago, IL
November 19, 2024*; 7:00 p.m., ESPN+		Milwaukee	L 74–80	0–4	21 – DiMichele	7 – Wilborn	4 – Dinkins	UPMC Cooper Fieldhouse (2,046); Pittsburgh, PA
November 24, 2024*; 1:30 p.m., FloSports		vs. South Dakota State; Cayman Islands Classic quarterfinals	L 60–71	0–5	19 – Dinkins III	5 – Edwards	3 – Dinkins III	John Gray Gymnasium; George Town, Cayman Islands
November 25, 2024*; 11:00 a.m., FloSports		vs. Hampton; Cayman Islands Classic consolation game	L 59–64	0–6	13 – DiMichele	11 – Barre	5 – Dinkins	John Gray Gymnasium (905); George Town, Cayman Islands
November 26, 2024*; 11:00 a.m., FloSports		vs. Old Dominion; Cayman Islands Classic 7th-place game	W 67–54	1–6	13 – Hronský	12 – Dixon	4 – Rozier	John Gray Gymnasium (920); George Town, Cayman Islands
December 3, 2024*; 7:00 p.m., ESPN+		Saint Peter's	L 59–62	1–7	15 – Corbett	8 – Barre	4 – Rozier	UPMC Cooper Fieldhouse (2,118); Pittsburgh, PA
December 6, 2024*; 6:00 p.m., ESPN+		Delaware	W 80–66	2–7	18 – Dinkins	7 – Necas	5 – Rozier	UPMC Cooper Fieldhouse (2,033); Pittsburgh, PA
December 11, 2024*; 7:00 p.m., ESPN+		Maine	L 56–61	2–8	12 – Dinkins	10 – Corbett	5 – Rozier	UPMC Cooper Fieldhouse (2,076); Pittsburgh, PA
December 14, 2024*; 6:00 p.m.		vs. Towson; LeBron James Classic	W 65–47	3–8	13 – Crawford	6 – 2 tied	6 – Rozier	LeBron James Arena (814); Akron, OH
December 21, 2024*; 2:30 p.m., ESPN+		UC Irvine	W 70–54	4–8	15 – Corbett	8 – Corbett	4 – Dinkins III	UPMC Cooper Fieldhouse (2,010); Pittsburgh, PA
December 27, 2024*; 7:00 p.m., ESPN+		Cleary	W 93–45	5–8	15 – Necas	8 – Dixon	6 – 3 tied	UPMC Cooper Fieldhouse (2,020); Pittsburgh, PA
Atlantic 10 regular season
December 31, 2024; 2:00 p.m., ESPN+		Rhode Island	W 67–55	6–8 (1–0)	13 – Corbett	10 – Corbett	5 – 2 tied	UPMC Cooper Fieldhouse (2,435); Pittsburgh, PA
January 4, 2025; 2:00 p.m., ESPN+		at Davidson	L 71–77	6–9 (1–1)	29 – Corbett	6 – 2 tied	4 – Crawford	John M. Belk Arena (2,378); Davidson, NC
January 8, 2025; 7:00 p.m., ESPN+		Saint Joseph's	W 85–81	7–9 (2–1)	26 – Dinkins III	9 – 2 tied	7 – Rozier	UPMC Cooper Fieldhouse (2,524); Pittsburgh, PA
January 15, 2025; 7:00 p.m., ESPN+		at George Washington	W 73–65	8–9 (3–1)	22 – Edwards	6 – Crawford	4 – 2 tied	Charles E. Smith Center (1,662); Washington, D.C.
January 18, 2025; 2:00 p.m., ESPN+		St. Bonaventure	W 75–57	9–9 (4–1)	17 – Edwards	6 – Necas	6 – 2 tied	UPMC Cooper Fieldhouse (3,104); Pittsburgh, PA
January 21, 2025; 7:00 p.m., ESPN+		Dayton	L 62–82	9–10 (4–2)	14 – Dinkins III	3 – 3 tied	5 – Rozier	UPMC Cooper Fieldhouse (3,218); Pittsburgh, PA
January 26, 2025; 12:30 p.m., USA		at Fordham	L 63–65	9–11 (4–3)	13 – Crawford	7 – Necas	2 – 2 tied	Rose Hill Gymnasium (1,651); The Bronx, NY
January 29, 2025; 7:00 p.m., ESPN+		at Saint Joseph's	L 72–76	9–12 (4–4)	27 – Dinkins III	8 – Corbett	3 – Corbett	Hagan Arena (2,284); Philadelphia, PA
February 1, 2025; 2:00 p.m., ESPN+		UMass	L 53–62	9–13 (4–5)	11 – Dinkins III	9 – Corbett	5 – Dinkins III	UPMC Cooper Fieldhouse (2,535); Pittsburgh, PA
February 5, 2025; 7:00 p.m., ESPN+		at Richmond	L 68–73	9–14 (4–6)	21 – Edwards	9 – Corbett	3 – Dinkins III	Robins Center (5,680); Richmond, VA
February 8, 2025; 6:00 p.m., CBSSN		Loyola Chicago	W 69–56	10–14 (5–6)	12 – Dinkins III	9 – Dixon	3 – 3 tied	UPMC Cooper Fieldhouse (2,577); Pittsburgh, PA
February 15, 2025; 2:30 p.m., USA		at Dayton	L 76–77	10–15 (5–7)	21 – Dinkins III	5 – Necas	3 – 3 tied	UD Arena (13,407); Dayton, OH
February 19, 2025; 7:00 p.m., ESPN+		Fordham	W 73–64	11–15 (6–7)	14 – Dixon	6 – Wilborn	7 – Hronský	UPMC Cooper Fieldhouse (2,485); Pittsburgh, PA
February 22, 2025; 4:00 p.m., ESPN+		at St. Bonaventure	L 63–70	11–16 (6–8)	15 – Dinkins III	10 – Edwards	5 – Rozier	Reilly Center (4,850); St. Bonaventure, NY
February 26, 2025; 6:30 p.m., ESPN+		at La Salle	W 67–62	12–16 (7–8)	15 – Crawford	6 – Crawford	10 – Dinkins III	Tom Gola Arena (1,322); Philadelphia, PA
March 1, 2025; 2:00 p.m., ESPN+		George Mason	W 85–68	13–16 (8–8)	20 – Dinkins III	5 – 2 tied	5 – Edwards	UPMC Cooper Fieldhouse (2,581); Pittsburgh, PA
March 4, 2025; 7:00 p.m., CBSSN		VCU	L 62–71	13–17 (8–9)	20 – Edwards	7 – Necas	5 – Dinkins III	UPMC Cooper Fieldhouse (2,574); Pittsburgh, PA
March 8, 2025; 8:00 p.m., ESPN+		at Saint Louis	L 88–90 ^{OT}	13–18 (8–10)	16 – Dinkins III	8 – Dixon	6 – Dinkins III	Chaifetz Arena (8,421); St. Louis, MO
A-10 tournament
March 13, 2025; 11:30 a.m., USA	(9)	vs. (8) St. Bonaventure; Second round	L 59–64	13–19	18 – Edwards	10 – Necas	4 – Crawford	Capital One Arena; Washington, D.C.
*Non-conference game. ^{#}Rankings from AP poll. (#) Tournament seedings in parentheses. All times are in Eastern.
