= 2023–24 Indiana State Sycamores men's basketball team =

American college basketball season

2023–24 Indiana State Sycamores men's basketball

Missouri Valley champions Ball Dawgs Classic champions

NIT, Runner-Up
- Conference: Missouri Valley Conference
- Record: 32–7 (17–3 MVC)
- Head coach: Josh Schertz (3rd season)
- Associate head coach: Matthew Graves
- Assistant coaches: Justin Furr; Antone Gray
- Home arena: Hulman Center

2023–24 Missouri Valley Conference men's basketball standings
	Conf.				Overall
Team	W		L	PCT	W		L	PCT
Indiana State	17	–	3	.850	32	–	7	.821
Drake †	16	–	4	.800	28	–	7	.800
Bradley	13	–	7	.650	23	–	12	.657
Northern Iowa	12	–	8	.600	19	–	14	.576
Belmont	12	–	8	.600	20	–	13	.606
Southern Illinois	11	–	9	.550	19	–	13	.594
Illinois State	9	–	11	.450	15	–	17	.469
Murray State	9	–	11	.450	12	–	20	.375
Missouri State	8	–	12	.400	17	–	16	.515
Evansville	6	–	14	.300	17	–	18	.486
UIC	4	–	16	.200	12	–	21	.364
Valparaiso	3	–	17	.150	7	–	25	.219
† 2024 MVC tournament winner

The 2023–24 Indiana State Sycamores men's basketball team represented Indiana State University during the 2023–24 NCAA Division I men's basketball season. The Sycamores, led by third-year head coach Josh Schertz, played their home games at the Hulman Center in Terre Haute, Indiana as members of the Missouri Valley Conference (MVC). The team finished the season 32–7, 17–3 in MVC play to win the regular-season championship. They defeated Missouri State and Northern Iowa before losing to Drake in the MVC tournament championship game. They received a bid to the National Invitation Tournament as a No. 1 seed. They defeated SMU, Minnesota, Cincinnati and Utah to advance to the NIT championship game. There they lost to Seton Hall.

On February 12, 2024, the Sycamores were ranked in the AP poll for the first time since the 1978–79 season. Consecutive losses to Illinois State and Southern Illinois right after they were ranked took them out of the poll after just one week.

On March 17, in a move that drew criticism, Indiana State was omitted from the NCAA tournament by the selection committee, instead receiving a bid to the National Invitation Tournament as a No. 1 seed. The Sycamores were the highest NET-ranked team (at 28 nationally) to miss the NCAA tournament.

On April 6, head coach Josh Schertz left the school to become the head coach at Saint Louis. On April 11, the school named associate head coach Matthew Graves the team's new head coach.

== Previous season ==
The Sycamores finished the 2022–23 season 23–13, 13–7 in MVC play, to finish in fifth place. They defeated Evansville in the opening round of the MVC tournament and Belmont in the quarterfinals, before losing to top-seeded Bradley in the semifinals. They received an invitation to play in the CBI, where they defeated USC Upstate in the first round, before falling to eventual tournament runner-up Eastern Kentucky in overtime in the quarterfinals.

== Roster ==
2023–24 Indiana State Sycamores men's basketball team
Players
Coaches

Pos.	#	Name	Height	Weight	Year	Previous school	Hometown
G	0	Xavier Bledson	6 ft 6 in (1.98 m)	215 lb (98 kg)	RS Sr	Lincoln Memorial	Gainesville, GA
G	1	Julian Larry	6 ft 3 in (1.91 m)	185 lb (84 kg)	Jr	iSchool Entrepreneurial Academy	Frisco, TX
G	2	Isaiah Swope	5 ft 10 in (1.78 m)	170 lb (77 kg)	Jr	Southern Indiana	Newburgh, IN
G	3	Ryan Conwell	6 ft 4 in (1.93 m)	195 lb (88 kg)	So	South Florida	Indianapolis, IN
G	5	Jaden Schertz	5 ft 11 in (1.8 m)	165 lb (75 kg)	So	Cumberland Gap High School	Harrogate, TN
F	7	Augustinas Kiudulas	6 ft 8 in (2.03 m)	215 lb (98 kg)	Fr	BC Rytas	Vilnius, Lithuania
G	10	Eli Shetlar	6 ft 6 in (1.98 m)	180 lb (82 kg)	Fr	Andover High School	Wichita, KS
F	11	Aaron Gray	6 ft 7 in (2.01 m)	215 lb (98 kg)	Jr	Niagara	Providence, RI
G	12	Masen Miller	5 ft 9 in (1.75 m)	180 lb (82 kg)	Jr	Truman State	Iowa City, IA
G	13	Cooper Bean	6 ft 4 in (1.93 m)	170 lb (77 kg)	Fr	Noblesville High School	Noblesville, IN
G/F	20	Jayson Kent	6 ft 8 in (2.03 m)	205 lb (93 kg)	Jr	Bradley	Oak Forest, IL
C	21	Robbie Avila	6 ft 10 in (2.08 m)	240 lb (109 kg)	So	Oak Forest High School	Oak Forest, IL
F	23	Jaden Daughtry	6 ft 7 in (2.01 m)	235 lb (107 kg)	Fr	Hargrave Military Academy	Richmond, VA
G	24	Jake Wolfe	6 ft 5 in (1.96 m)	200 lb (91 kg)	RS Sr	Morehead State	Aurora, IL
F	35	Derek Vorst	6 ft 10 in (2.08 m)	250 lb (113 kg)	Fr	Rossford High School	Rossford, OH

Head coach

- Josh Schertz (Florida Atlantic)

Assistant coach(es)

- Matthew Graves (Butler)
- Justin Furr (Wingate)
- Antone Gray (Rhode Island College)

Legend

- (C) Team captain
- (S) Suspended
- (I) Ineligible
- (W) Walk-on
- Injured
- Current redshirt

Roster
Last update: November 17, 2023

== Schedule and results ==
Date time, TV	Rank^{#}	Opponent^{#}	Result	Record	Site (attendance) city, state
Regular season
November 6, 2023*; 7:00 p.m., ESPN+		Saint Mary-of-the-Woods	W 90–60	1–0	Hulman Center (4,388); Terre Haute, IN
November 10, 2023*; 8:00 p.m., SECN+/ESPN+		at No. 24 Alabama	L 80–102	1–1	Coleman Coliseum (10,900); Tuscaloosa, AL
November 14, 2023*; 7:00 p.m., ESPN+		IUPUI	W 96–57	2–1	Hulman Center (3,470); Terre Haute, IN
November 21, 2023*; 6:30 p.m., FloHoops		vs. Rice; Ball Dawgs Classic	W 103–88	3–1	Dollar Loan Center; Henderson, NV
November 22, 2023*; 7:00 p.m., FloHoops		vs. Pepperdine; Ball Dawgs Classic	W 90–82	4–1	Dollar Loan Center; Henderson, NV
November 24, 2023*; 2:00 p.m., FloHoops		vs. Toledo; Ball Dawgs Classic	W 76–74	5–1	Dollar Loan Center; Henderson, NV
November 28, 2023; 7:00 p.m., ESPN+		Southern Illinois	W 77–48	6–1 (1–0)	Hulman Center (4,009); Terre Haute, IN
December 2, 2023; 2:00 p.m., ESPNU/ESPN+		at Bradley	W 85–77	7–1 (2–0)	Carver Arena (5,639); Peoria, IL
December 5, 2023*; 8:00 p.m., ESPN+		at Northern Illinois	W 90–67	8–1	Convocation Center (1,242); DeKalb, IL
December 9, 2023*; 2:00 p.m., ESPN+		Southern Indiana	W 98–54	9–1	Hulman Center (4,369); Terre Haute, IN
December 16, 2023*; 1:45 p.m., Peacock		vs. Ball State; Indy Classic	W 83–72	10–1	Gainbridge Fieldhouse (16,812); Indianapolis, IN
December 19, 2023*; 7:00 p.m., ESPN+		Tennessee State	W 90–69	11–1	Hulman Center (4,291); Terre Haute, IN
December 30, 2023*; 2:00 p.m., FS1		at Michigan State	L 75–87	11–2	Breslin Center (14,797); East Lansing, MI
January 3, 2024; 7:00 p.m., ESPN+		Evansville	W 87–73	12–2 (3–0)	Hulman Center (4,457); Terre Haute, IN
January 7, 2024; 3:00 p.m., ESPN+		at Northern Iowa	W 77–66	13–2 (4–0)	McLeod Center (3,891); Cedar Falls, IA
January 10, 2024; 8:00 p.m., ESPN+		at Drake	L 78–89	13–3 (4–1)	Knapp Center (4,069); Des Moines, IA
January 13, 2024; 2:00 p.m., ESPN+		Belmont	W 94–64	14–3 (5–1)	Hulman Center (5,963); Terre Haute, IN
January 16, 2024; 7:00 p.m., ESPN+		Missouri State	W 88–66	15–3 (6–1)	Hulman Center (4,803); Terre Haute, IN
January 21, 2024; 5:00 p.m., ESPN+		at Murray State	W 72–63	16–3 (7–1)	CFSB Center (6,017); Murray, KY
January 24, 2024; 8:00 p.m., ESPN+		at UIC	W 89–83	17–3 (8–1)	Credit Union 1 Arena (2,174); Chicago, IL
January 27, 2024; 6:00 p.m., ESPN+		Bradley	W 95–86 ^{OT}	18–3 (9–1)	Hulman Center (8,223); Terre Haute, IN
January 31, 2024; 7:30 p.m., ESPN+		at Belmont	W 78–72	19–3 (10–1)	Curb Event Center (2,263); Nashville, TN
February 3, 2024; 6:00 p.m., ESPN+		Drake	W 75–67	20–3 (11–1)	Hulman Center (8,332); Terre Haute, IN
February 7, 2024; 7:00 p.m., ESPN+		Valparaiso	W 101–61	21–3 (12–1)	Hulman Center (5,716); Terre Haute, IN
February 10, 2024; 6:00 p.m., ESPN+		at Missouri State	W 73–71	22–3 (13–1)	Great Southern Bank Arena (3,517); Springfield, MO
February 13, 2024; 7:00 p.m., ESPN+	No. 23	Illinois State	L 67–80	22–4 (13–2)	Hulman Center (5,988); Terre Haute, IN
February 17, 2024; 8:00 p.m., ESPN+	No. 23	at Southern Illinois	L 69–74	22–5 (13–3)	Banterra Center (6,019); Carbondale, IL
February 21, 2024; 8:00 p.m., ESPN+		at Valparaiso	W 83–64	23–5 (14–3)	Athletics–Recreation Center (2,428); Valparaiso, IN
February 24, 2024; 6:00 p.m., ESPN+		UIC	W 88–73	24–5 (15–3)	Hulman Center (8,061); Terre Haute, IN
February 28, 2024; 8:00 p.m., ESPN+		at Evansville	W 85–67	25–5 (16–3)	Ford Center (6,419); Evansville, IN
March 3, 2024; 2:00 p.m., ESPN+		Murray State	W 89–77	26–5 (17–3)	Hulman Center; Terre Haute, IN
MVC tournament
March 8, 2024; 1:00 p.m., MVC TV	(1)	vs. (9) Missouri State; Quarterfinals	W 75–59	27–5	Enterprise Center; St. Louis, MO
March 9, 2024; 3:30 p.m., CBSSN	(1)	vs. (4) Northern Iowa; Semifinals	W 94–72	28–5	Enterprise Center; St. Louis, MO
March 10, 2024; 2:00 p.m., CBS	(1)	vs. (2) Drake; Championship	L 80–84	28–6	Enterprise Center; St. Louis, MO
NIT
March 20, 2024; 7:00 p.m., ESPN+	(1)	SMU; First round – Indiana State Bracket	W 101–92	29–6	Hulman Center (6,421); Terre Haute, IN
March 24, 2024; 2:00 p.m., ESPN2	(1)	Minnesota; Second round – Indiana State Bracket	W 76–64	30–6	Hulman Center (8,239); Terre Haute, IN
March 26, 2024; 9:00 p.m., ESPN	(1)	(2) Cincinnati; Quarterfinals – Indiana State Bracket	W 85–81	31–6	Hulman Center (8,057); Terre Haute, IN
April 2, 2024; 7:00 p.m., ESPN	(1)	vs. (2) Utah; Semifinals	W 100–90	32–6	Hinkle Fieldhouse (8,889); Indianapolis, IN
April 4, 2024; 7:00 p.m., ESPN	(1)	vs. (1) Seton Hall; Championship	L 77–79	32–7	Hinkle Fieldhouse (9,100); Indianapolis, IN
*Non-conference game. ^{#}Rankings from AP poll. (#) Tournament seedings in parentheses. All times are in Eastern.

== Rankings ==
Ranking movements Legend: ██ Increase in ranking ██ Decrease in ranking — = Not ranked RV = Received votes
	Week																					
Poll	Pre	1	2	3	4	5	6	7	8	9	10	11	12	13	14	15	16	17	18	19	20	Final
AP	—	—	—	—	—	—	—	—	—	—	—	—	RV	RV	23	—	RV	RV	RV	RV	—	RV
Coaches	—	—	—	—	—	—	RV	—	RV	RV	RV	RV	RV	RV	24	—	RV	RV	RV	RV	RV	RV
