= 2025–26 VCU Rams men's basketball team =

American college basketball season

2025–26 VCU Rams men's basketball

A-10 regular-season and tournament champions

NCAA tournament, Second round
- Conference: Atlantic 10 Conference
- Record: 28–8 (15–3 A-10)
- Head coach: Phil Martelli Jr. (1st season)
- Associate head coach: Jimmy Martelli (1st season)
- Assistant coaches: Chris Cole (1st season); Ryan Daly (1st season); Brandon Rozzell (1st season)
- Home arena: Stuart C. Siegel Center

2025–26 Atlantic 10 men's basketball standings
	Conf.				Overall
Team	W		L	PCT	W		L	PCT
Saint Louis	15	–	3	.833	29	–	6	.829
VCU †	15	–	3	.833	28	–	8	.778
Saint Joseph's	13	–	5	.722	24	–	12	.667
Dayton	12	–	6	.667	25	–	12	.676
George Mason	11	–	7	.611	23	–	10	.697
Davidson	10	–	8	.556	20	–	14	.588
Duquesne	9	–	9	.500	18	–	15	.545
Fordham	8	–	10	.444	17	–	15	.531
George Washington	8	–	10	.444	19	–	16	.543
Rhode Island	7	–	11	.389	16	–	16	.500
Richmond	5	–	13	.278	15	–	17	.469
La Salle	5	–	13	.278	9	–	23	.281
St. Bonaventure	4	–	14	.222	17	–	17	.500
Loyola Chicago	4	–	14	.222	9	–	24	.273
† 2026 A-10 tournament winner

The 2025–26 VCU Rams men's basketball team represented Virginia Commonwealth University during the 2025–26 NCAA Division I men's basketball season. The Rams, led by first-year head coach Phil Martelli Jr., played their home games at the Siegel Center in Richmond, Virginia, as a member of the Atlantic 10 Conference.

== Previous season ==
The 2024–25 team finished the season as both Atlantic 10 regular season and tournament champions, making it the first year since 2023 the Rams won both the regular season and tournament. During the season, VCU finished with a 28–7 overall record, and a 15–3 record in Atlantic 10 conference play. The Rams defeated their rivals, George Mason, in the Atlantic 10 championship game, earning the conference's automatic berth into the 2025 NCAA Division I men's basketball tournament. There, the Rams were seeded 11th and lost in the opening round to the six-seed, BYU.

VCU point guard, Max Shulga, finished the season earning the Atlantic 10 Conference Men's Basketball Player of the Year. Following the season, head coach, Ryan Odom, accepted a job to coach the University of Virginia, his alma mater, finishing his two-year coaching career with VCU with a 52–21 record and a 26–10 record in Atlantic 10 play. Three days after Odom's departure, VCU hired Bryant University's men's basketball coach, Phil Martelli Jr., making Martelli Jr. the fifth head coach at VCU in the last ten years.

== Offseason ==
=== Departures ===
VCU departures
Name	Number	Pos.	Height	Weight	Year	Hometown	Reason for departure
Phillip Russell	1	PG	6 ft 0 in (1.83 m)	180 pounds (82 kg)	Senior	St. Louis, MO	Graduated
Zeb Jackson	2	SG	6 ft 5 in (1.96 m)	190 pounds (86 kg)	Graduate	Toledo, OH	Graduated
Jack Clark	4	PF	6 ft 10 in (2.08 m)	215 pounds (98 kg)	Graduate	Cheltenham, PA	Graduated
Max Shulga	11	PG	6 ft 5 in (1.96 m)	197 pounds (89 kg)	Graduate	Kyiv, UKR	Graduated
Joe Bamisile	22	SG	6 ft 4 in (1.93 m)	200 pounds (91 kg)	Graduate	Richmond, VA	Graduated

==== Outgoing transfers ====
Outgoing transfers
Name	Number	Pos.	Height	Weight	Hometown	Year	New school
Alphonzo Billups III	5	UTL	6 ft 7 in (2.01 m)	180 pounds (82 kg)	Richmond, VA	RS Junior	Longwood
Luke Bamgboye	9	C	6 ft 10 in (2.08 m)	200 pounds (91 kg)	London, GBR	Sophomore	Texas Tech
Martin Carrère	17	UTL	6 ft 8 in (2.03 m)	180 pounds (82 kg)	Pontonx-sur-l'Adour, FR	Sophomore	Virginia

=== Incoming transfers ===
VCU incoming transfers
Name	Number	Pos.	Height	Weight	Year	Hometown	Previous School
Jadrian Tracey	2	G	6 ft 5 in (1.96 m)	210 pounds (95 kg)	RS-Senior	Fort Myers, FL	Oregon
Ahmad Nowell	4	PG	6 ft 0 in (1.83 m)	195 pounds (88 kg)	Sophomore	Philadelphia, PA	UConn
Barry Evans	5	SF	6 ft 8 in (2.03 m)	215 pounds (98 kg)	Junior	Baltimore, MD	Bryant
Tyrell Ward	15	G	6 ft 6 in (1.98 m)	195 pounds (88 kg)	Junior	Washington, D.C.	LSU
Lazar Đoković	17	PF	6 ft 11 in (2.11 m)	235 pounds (107 kg)	Junior	Gornji Milanovac, Serbia	Charleston
Keyshawn Mitchell	22	PF	6 ft 11 in (2.11 m)	215 pounds (98 kg)	Sophomore	Brooklyn, NY	Bryant

== Roster ==
2025–26 VCU Rams men's basketball team
Players
Coaches

Pos.	#	Name	Height	Weight	Year	Previous school	Hometown
G	0	Brandon Jennings	6 ft 4 in (1.93 m)	175 lb (79 kg)	So	St. Christopher School	Richmond, VA
G	1	Nyk Lewis	6 ft 1 in (1.85 m)	195 lb (88 kg)	Fr	Gonzaga College	Washington, D.C.
G	2	Jadrian Tracey	6 ft 6 in (1.98 m)	210 lb (95 kg)	RS Sr	Oregon	Fort Myers, FL
G	4	Ahmad Nowell	6 ft 0 in (1.83 m)	195 lb (88 kg)	So	UConn	Philadelphia, PA
F	5	Barry Evans	6 ft 8 in (2.03 m)	215 lb (98 kg)	Sr	Bryant	Baltimore, MD
G	6	Terrence Hill Jr.	6 ft 3 in (1.91 m)	180 lb (82 kg)	So	Roosevelt	Portland, OR
F	7	Obinnaya Okafor (W)	6 ft 9 in (2.06 m)	215 lb (98 kg)	RS Jr	Bethel	Hampton, VA
G/F	8	Michael Belle	6 ft 8 in (2.03 m)	220 lb (100 kg)	Jr	Strasbourg	London, England
F	10	Jordann Dumont	6 ft 8 in (2.03 m)	220 lb (100 kg)	So	Villanova	Montreal, Quebec, Canada
G	14	Jordan Tillery	6 ft 5 in (1.96 m)	180 lb (82 kg)	Fr	IMG Academy	Orlando, FL
G	15	Tyrell Ward	6 ft 6 in (1.98 m)	195 lb (88 kg)	Jr	LSU	Washington, D.C.
F	17	Lazar Đoković	6 ft 11 in (2.11 m)	235 lb (107 kg)	Jr	Charleston	Gornji Milanovac, Serbia
F	21	Christian Fermin	6 ft 10 in (2.08 m)	225 lb (102 kg)	Sr	Pocono Mountain West	Tobyhanna, PA
F	22	Keyshawn Mitchell	6 ft 11 in (2.11 m)	215 lb (98 kg)	Jr	Bryant	Brooklyn, NY

Head coach

- Phil Martelli Jr. (Saint Joseph's)

Assistant coach(es)

- Jimmy Martelli (Dickinson)
- Chris Cole (Cal State Dominguez Hills)
- Ryan Daly (Saint Joseph's)
- Brandon Rozzell (VCU)

Legend

- (C) Team captain
- (S) Suspended
- (I) Ineligible
- (W) Walk-on
- Injured
- Current redshirt

Roster

== Schedule and results ==
Date time, TV	Rank^{#}	Opponent^{#}	Result	Record	High points	High rebounds	High assists	Site (attendance) city, state
Exhibition
October 19, 2025*; 5:00 p.m.		at Villanova	L 51–70		12 – Tracey	6 – Tied	3 – Evans	Finneran Pavilion (4,799); Philadelphia, PA
October 26, 2025*; 2:00 p.m.		Fairfield	W 82–64		18 – Ward	11 – Evans	5 – Tracey	Siegel Center (6,080); Richmond, VA
Non-conference regular season
November 3, 2025*; 7:00 p.m., MASN/ESPN+		Wagner	W 103–74	1–0	21 – Đoković	8 – Jennings	6 – Jennings	Siegel Center (7,637); Richmond, VA
November 7, 2025*; 8:00 p.m., Urban Edge Network		vs. Utah State; Texas Showcase	L 77–80	1–1	19 – Lewis	8 – Evans	6 – Evans	Comerica Center (2,049); Frisco, TX
November 12, 2025*; 7:00 p.m., MASN/ESPN+		Saint Peter's	W 78–61	2–1	15 – Ward	8 – Evans	4 – Evans	Siegel Center (7,637); Richmond, VA
November 17, 2025*; 7:00 p.m., ACCN		at No. 25 NC State	L 79–85	2–2	18 – Evans	5 – Tied	7 – Tracey	Lenovo Center (14,805); Raleigh, NC
November 22, 2025*; 7:00 p.m., MASN/ESPN+		Coppin State	W 101–58	3–2	11 – Tied	8 – Đoković	4 – Evans	Siegel Center (7,242); Richmond, VA
November 26, 2025*; 2:30 p.m., ESPN2		vs. South Florida; Battle 4 Atlantis quarterfinals	W 78–66	4–2	20 – Đoković	10 – Evans	3 – Tracey	Imperial Arena (446); Nassau, Bahamas
November 27, 2025*; 12:00 p.m., ESPN		vs. No. 24 Vanderbilt; Battle 4 Atlantis semifinals	L 74–89	4–3	16 – Lewis	6 – Belle	2 – Tied	Imperial Arena (417); Nassau, Bahamas
November 28, 2025*; 10:30 a.m., ESPN2		vs. Virginia Tech; Battle 4 Atlantis 3rd place game	W 86–68	5–3	21 – Hill Jr.	6 – Belle	3 – Tied	Imperial Arena (485); Nassau, Bahamas
December 5, 2025*; 7:00 p.m., MASN/ESPN+		Samford	W 83–57	6–3	22 – Hill Jr.	13 – Tracey	6 – Evans	Siegel Center (7,637); Richmond, VA
December 10, 2025*; 7:00 p.m., MASN/ESPN+		New Mexico	L 78–81	6–4	14 – Lewis	8 – Evans	6 – Jennings	Siegel Center (7,637); Richmond, VA
December 15, 2025*; 7:00 p.m., MASN/ESPN+		Niagara	W 84–58	7–4	18 – Đoković	12 – Lewis	4 – Lewis	Siegel Center (7,637); Richmond, VA
December 18, 2025*; 7:00 p.m., MASN/ESPN+		American	W 105–83	8–4	17 – Hill Jr.	8 – Belle	6 – Lewis	Siegel Center (7,637); Richmond, VA
December 22, 2025*; 7:00 p.m., MASN/WTVR/ESPN+		Rider	W 100–79	9–4	19 – Nowell	10 – Mitchell	6 – Tracey	Siegel Center (7,637); Richmond, VA
Atlantic 10 regular season
December 31, 2025; 2:00 p.m., MASN/ESPN+		St. Bonaventure	W 89–82	10–4 (1–0)	23 – Đoković	7 – Lewis	4 – Evans	Siegel Center (7,637); Richmond, VA
January 3, 2026; 12:00 p.m., USA		at Duquesne	W 93–80	11–4 (2–0)	21 – Hill Jr.	11 – Đoković	5 – Jennings	UPMC Cooper Fieldhouse (2,643); Pittsburgh, PA
January 7, 2026; 7:00 p.m., CBSSN		Saint Louis	L 62–71	11–5 (2–1)	17 – Hill Jr.	12 – Đoković	2 – Tied	Siegel Center (7,637); Richmond, VA
January 10, 2026; 12:00 p.m., ESPNU		at George Mason; Rivalry	L 80–86	11–6 (2–2)	23 – Đoković	8 – Lewis	4 – Hill Jr.	EagleBank Arena (6,370); Fairfax, VA
January 14, 2026; 6:00 p.m., CBSSN		at Rhode Island	W 84–75	12–6 (3–2)	19 – Hill Jr.	5 – Tied	4 – Mitchell	Ryan Center (3,712); Kingston, RI
January 19, 2026; 3:00 p.m., CBSSN		Saint Joseph's	W 79–72	13–6 (4–2)	20 – Belle	6 – Evans	8 – Hill Jr.	Siegel Center (7,637); Richmond, VA
January 24, 2026; 5:00 p.m., USA		at Davidson	W 75–69	14–6 (5–2)	20 – Đoković	8 – Tied	4 – Hill Jr.	John M. Belk Arena (3,538); Davidson, NC
January 27, 2026; 7:00 p.m., CBSSN		Richmond; Capital City Classic	W 77–69	15–6 (6–2)	14 – Hill Jr.	10 – Evans	3 – Evans	Siegel Center (7,637); Richmond, VA
January 30, 2026; 9:00 p.m., ESPN2		Loyola Chicago	W 89–70	16–6 (7–2)	24 – Hill Jr.	8 – Đoković	5 – Hill Jr.	Siegel Center (7,637); Richmond, VA
February 3, 2026; 7:00 p.m., ESPN+		at Fordham	W 63–59	17–6 (8–2)	17 – Đoković	8 – Tied	3 – Tied	Rose Hill Gymnasium (1,065); Bronx, NY
February 6, 2026; 7:00 p.m., ESPN2		Dayton	W 99−73	18−6 (9–2)	26 – Tracey	8 – Belle	3 – Jennings	Siegel Center (7,637); Richmond, VA
February 11, 2026; 6:30 p.m., ESPN+		at La Salle	W 77–68	19−6 (10–2)	26 – Đoković	11 – Lewis	4 – Hill Jr.	John Glaser Arena (718); Philadelphia, PA
February 14, 2026; 6:00 p.m., CBSSN		at Richmond; Capital City Classic	W 78–67	20–6 (11–2)	20 – Hill Jr.	10 – Belle	4 – Tied	Robins Center (6,173); Richmond, VA
February 17, 2026; 8:00 p.m., CBSSN		George Washington	W 89–75	21–6 (12–2)	15 – Ward	7 – Evans	7 – Hill Jr.	Siegel Center (7,637); Richmond, VA
February 20, 2026; 7:00 p.m., ESPN2		at No. 18 Saint Louis	L 75–88	21–7 (12–3)	19 – Đoković	8 – Tied	3 – Tied	Chaifetz Arena (10,223); St. Louis, MO
February 28, 2026; 12:30 p.m., USA		Fordham	W 83–62	22–7 (13–3)	15 – Tracey	7 – Jennings	4 – Tracey	Siegel Center (7,637); Richmond, VA
March 3, 2026; 7:00 p.m., CBSSN		George Mason; Rivalry	W 70–65	23–7 (14–3)	16 – Hill Jr.	6 – Tracey	2 – Hill Jr.	Siegel Center (7,637); Richmond, VA
March 6, 2026; 7:00 p.m., ESPN2		at Dayton	W 68–62	24–7 (15–3)	16 – Đoković	7 – Jennings	4 – Jennings	UD Arena (13,407); Dayton, OH
Atlantic 10 tournament
March 13, 2026; 5:00 p.m., USA	(2)	vs. (7) Duquesne; Quarterfinal	W 71–66	25–7	20 – Hill Jr.	7 – Belle	6 – Hill Jr.	PPG Paints Arena; Pittsburgh, PA
March 14, 2026; 3:30 p.m., CBSSN	(2)	vs. (3) Saint Joseph's; Semifinal	W 77–64	26–7	18 – Hill Jr.	8 – Lewis	4 – Jennings	PPG Paints Arena (8,523); Pittsburgh, PA
March 15, 2026; 1:00 p.m., CBS	(2)	vs. (4) Dayton; Championship	W 70–62	27–7	17 – Lewis	11 – Lewis	2 – Tied	PPG Paints Arena (9,114); Pittsburgh, PA
NCAA tournament
March 19, 2026; 6:50 p.m., TNT	(11 S)	vs. (6 S) No. 21 North Carolina; First round	W 82–78 ^{OT}	28–7	34 – Hill Jr.	7 – Tied	5 – Hill Jr.	Bon Secours Wellness Arena; Greenville, SC
March 21, 2026; 7:50 p.m., CBS	(11 S)	vs. (3 S) No. 13 Illinois; Second round	L 55–76	28–8	17 – Hill Jr.	7 – Hill Jr.	2 – Tied	Bon Secours Wellness Arena (14,178); Greenville, SC
*Non-conference game. ^{#}Rankings from AP poll. (#) Tournament seedings in parentheses. S=South. All times are in Eastern Time.
