= 2024–25 Saint Louis Billikens men's basketball team =

American college basketball season

2024–25 Saint Louis Billikens men's basketball
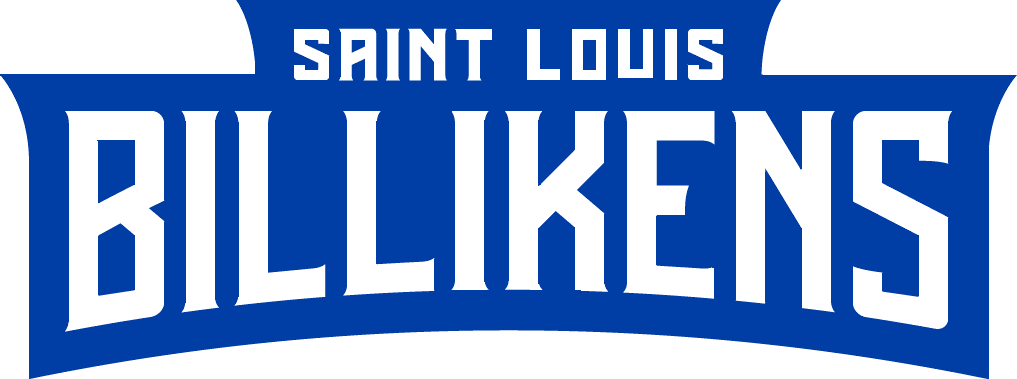

NIT, First Round
- Conference: Atlantic 10 Conference
- Record: 19–15 (11–7 A–10)
- Head coach: Josh Schertz (1st season)
- Assistant coaches: Zak Boisvert; Antone Gray; Corey Tate; Rob Gardiner; Phil Gaetano
- Home arena: Chaifetz Arena

2024–25 Atlantic 10 men's basketball standings
	Conf.				Overall
Team	W		L	PCT	W		L	PCT
VCU †	15	–	3	.833	28	–	7	.800
George Mason	15	–	3	.833	27	–	9	.750
Dayton	12	–	6	.667	23	–	11	.676
Loyola Chicago	12	–	6	.667	25	–	12	.676
Saint Louis	11	–	7	.611	19	–	15	.559
Saint Joseph's	11	–	7	.611	22	–	13	.629
George Washington	9	–	9	.500	21	–	13	.618
St. Bonaventure	9	–	9	.500	22	–	12	.647
Duquesne	8	–	10	.444	13	–	19	.406
Rhode Island	7	–	11	.389	18	–	13	.581
UMass	7	–	11	.389	12	–	20	.375
Davidson	6	–	12	.333	17	–	16	.515
Richmond	5	–	13	.278	10	–	22	.313
La Salle	5	–	13	.278	14	–	19	.424
Fordham	3	–	15	.167	12	–	21	.364
† 2025 A-10 tournament winner

The 2024–25 Saint Louis Billikens men's basketball team represented Saint Louis University during the 2024–25 NCAA Division I men's basketball season. The Billikens, led by first-year head coach Josh Schertz, played their home games at Chaifetz Arena as a member of the Atlantic 10 Conference.

== Previous season ==
The Billikens finished the 2023–24 season 13–20, 5–13 in A-10 Play to finish in tie for thirteenth place. As a No. 14 seed they defeated Rhode Island in the first round of the A-10 tournament before losing to Duquesne in the second round.

Following the season, the school announced that head coach Travis Ford would not return as head coach after eight years with the school. On April 6, 2024, the school named Indiana State head coach Josh Schertz the team's new head coach.

== Offseason ==
=== Departures ===
Name	Number	Pos.	Height	Weight	Year	Hometown	Reason for departure
Cian Medley	1	G	5'11"	165	Freshman	Sicklerville, NJ	Transferred to Kent State
Bradley Ezewiro	3	F	6'9"	265	Junior	Torrance, CA	Transferred to UAB
Đorđe Ćurčić	4	G	6'2"	185	Freshman	Čačak, Serbia	Transferred to Charleston
Tim Dalger	5	F	6'7"	215	(redshirt) Senior	Fort Lauderdale, FL	Graduated
Michael Meadows	7	G	6'2"	175	(redshirt) Senior	Hollywood, CA	Graduated
Abou Magassa	10	F	6'7"	215	Freshman	Morsang-sur-Orage, France	Transferred to Wyoming
Alex Nokes	11	F	6'6"	210	Freshman	Pacific Palisades, CA	Walk-on; transferred to Lindenwood
Bruce Zhang	12	C	7'0"	265	Freshman	Nanchang, China	Transferred
Tsvet Sotirov	13	F	6'7"	210	Freshman	Rolling Meadows, IL	Walk-on; transferred to Northern Illinois
Stef Van Bussel	15	C	6'10"	255	Freshman	Ommel, Netherlands	Transferred to Charleston
Sincere Parker	21	G	6'3"	195	Junior	Rockford, IL	Transferred to NcNeese
Terrence Hargrove Jr.	22	F	6'5"	215	Senior	East St. Louis, IL	Graduated
Phil Jones	25	G	6'1"	185	Sophomore	Chicago, IL	Walk-on; transferred
Lamont Evans IV	33	G	6'0"	155	Junior	Hollywood, FL	Walk-on; transferred

=== Incoming transfers ===
Name	Number	Pos.	Height	Weight	Year	Hometown	Previous School
Isaiah Swope	1	G	5'10"	170	Senior	Newburgh, IN	Indiana State
Jaden Schertz	5	G	5'11"	165	Junior	Harrogate, TN	Walk-on; Indiana State
Kalu Anya	6	F	6'8"	215	Junior	Worcester, MA	Brown
Kobe Johnson	8	G	6'3"	210	Senior	Canton, OH	West Virginia
Josiah Dotzler	13	G	6'3"	180	Sophomore	Omaha, NE	Creighton
Kilian Brockhoff	14	F	6'9"	225	Sophomore	Cuxhaven, Germany	UC Santa Barbara
Robbie Avila	21	C	6'10"	240	Junior	Oak Forest, IL	Indiana State
AJ Casey	23	F	6'9"	221	Junior	Indianapolis, IN	Miami (FL)

=== Recruiting classes ===
==== 2024 recruiting class ====
College recruiting information
Name	Hometown	School	Height	Weight	Commit date
Dylan Warlick #22 SF	Edmond, OK	Edmond North High School	6 ft 6 in (1.98 m)	190 lb (86 kg)	May 22, 2024
Dylan Warlick #22 SF	Recruit ratings: Rivals: 247Sports: ESPN: (79)				
Amari McCottry; SF	Milwaukee, WI	St. Thomas More High School	6 ft 5 in (1.96 m)	180 lb (82 kg)	Apr 20, 2024
Amari McCottry; SF	Recruit ratings: Rivals: 247Sports: ESPN: (NR)				
Max Pikaar; PF	Leiden, Netherlands	Sunrise Christian Academy	6 ft 11 in (2.11 m)	200 lb (91 kg)	Apr 13, 2024
Max Pikaar; PF	Recruit ratings: Rivals: 247Sports: ESPN: (NR)				
Overall recruit ranking:
Note: In many cases, Scout, Rivals, 247Sports, On3, and ESPN may conflict in their listings of height and weight.; In these cases, the average was taken. ESPN grades are on a 100-point scale.; Sources: "2024 Team Ranking". Rivals.

==== 2025 recruiting class ====
College recruiting information (2025)
Name	Hometown	School	Height	Weight	Commit date
Jax Kerr; C	Tulsa, OK	Owasso High School	6 ft 11 in (2.11 m)	200 lb (91 kg)	Sep 5, 2024
Jax Kerr; C	Recruit ratings: Rivals: 247Sports: ESPN: (NR)				
Luke Laczkowski; SF	Dallas, TX	St. Mark's School	6 ft 7 in (2.01 m)	200 lb (91 kg)	Sep 23, 2024
Luke Laczkowski; SF	Recruit ratings: Rivals: 247Sports: ESPN: (NR)				
Cameron Hutson; SF	East Lansing, MI	East Lansing High School	6 ft 6 in (1.98 m)	190 lb (86 kg)	Sep 16, 2024
Cameron Hutson; SF	Recruit ratings: Rivals: 247Sports: ESPN: (NR)				
Overall recruit ranking:
Note: In many cases, Scout, Rivals, 247Sports, On3, and ESPN may conflict in their listings of height and weight.; In these cases, the average was taken. ESPN grades are on a 100-point scale.; Sources: "2025 Team Ranking". Rivals.

== Roster ==
2024–25 Saint Louis Billikens men's basketball team
Players
Coaches

Pos.	#	Name	Height	Weight	Year	Previous school	Hometown
G	0	Kellen Thames	6 ft 6 in (1.98 m)	210 lb (95 kg)	Jr	Pattonville	St. Louis, MO
G	1	Isaiah Swope	5 ft 10 in (1.78 m)	175 lb (79 kg)	Sr	Castle; Indiana State	Newburgh, IN
G	2	Larry Hughes Jr. (W)	6 ft 4 in (1.93 m)	185 lb (84 kg)	Jr	CBC	St. Louis, MO
G	4	Amari McCottry	6 ft 5 in (1.96 m)	205 lb (93 kg)	Fr	St. Thomas More	Milwaukee, WI
G	5	Jaden Schertz (W)	5 ft 11 in (1.8 m)	165 lb (75 kg)	So	Cumberland Gap; Indiana State	Harrogate, TN
F	6	Kalu Anya	6 ft 8 in (2.03 m)	225 lb (102 kg)	Jr	IMG Academy; Brown	Worcester, MA
G	8	Kobe Johnson	6 ft 4 in (1.93 m)	200 lb (91 kg)	Sr	Canton McKinley; West Virginia	Canton, OH
G	12	Isaac Holmes (W)	6 ft 4 in (1.93 m)	230 lb (104 kg)	So	Apex	Apex, NC
G	13	Josiah Dotzler	6 ft 3 in (1.91 m)	185 lb (84 kg)	So	Bellevue West; Creighton	Omaha, NE
F	14	Kilian Brockhoff	6 ft 9 in (2.06 m)	230 lb (104 kg)	So	Sports Club Rasta Vechta; UC Santa Barbara	Cuxhaven, Germany
C	21	Robbie Avila	6 ft 10 in (2.08 m)	240 lb (109 kg)	Jr	Oak Forest; Indiana State	Oak Forest, IL
G	22	Nick Patton (W)	6 ft 1 in (1.85 m)	190 lb (86 kg)	Fr	Loyola Academy	Westerville, OH
F	23	AJ Casey	6 ft 8 in (2.03 m)	225 lb (102 kg)	Jr	Whitney Young; Miami (FL)	Chicago, IL
G	24	Gibson Jimerson	6 ft 5 in (1.96 m)	215 lb (98 kg)	RS Sr	Montverde Academy	Richmond, VA
F	33	Dylan Warlick	6 ft 5 in (1.96 m)	210 lb (95 kg)	Fr	Edmond North	Edmond, OK
F	35	Max Pikaar	6 ft 11 in (2.11 m)	200 lb (91 kg)	Fr	Sunrise Christian Academy (KS)	Leiden, Netherlands

Head coach

- Josh Schertz (Florida Atlantic)

Assistant coach(es)

- Zak Boisvert (Fordham)
- Antone Gray (Rhode Island College)
- Corey Tate (Missouri)
- Rob Gardiner (Wright State)
- Phil Gaetano (Sacred Heart)

Legend

- (C) Team captain
- (S) Suspended
- (I) Ineligible
- (W) Walk-on
- Injured
- Current redshirt

Roster

== Schedule and results ==
Date time, TV	Rank^{#}	Opponent^{#}	Result	Record	High points	High rebounds	High assists	Site (attendance) city, state
Exhibition
October 18, 2024*; 7:00 p.m.		Rockhurst	W 86–65	–	14 – McCottry	11 – Anya	3 – Tied	Chaifetz Arena; St. Louis, MO
October 25, 2024*; 7:00 p.m.		Maryville	W 106–65	–	17 – Thames	8 – Anya	3 – Tied	Chaifetz Arena; St. Louis, MO
Non-conference regular season
November 4, 2024*; 2:00 p.m., YouTube		vs. Santa Clara; Field of 68 Opening Day Showcase	L 78−85	0−1	24 – Swope	11 – Anya	5 – Tied	Sanford Pentagon (2,300); Sioux Falls, SD
November 10, 2024*; 3:00 p.m., FDSNMW/ESPN+		Avila	W 95–44	1–1	28 – Jimerson	8 – Tied	6 – McCottry	Chaifetz Arena (4,925); St. Louis, MO
November 16, 2024*; 7:00 p.m., FDSNMW/ESPN+		Loyola Marymount	W 77–71	2–1	23 – Tied	13 – Anya	5 – Anya	Chaifetz Arena (5,210); St. Louis, MO
November 22, 2024*; 9:30 p.m., Peacock		vs. Wichita State; Hall of Fame Classic	L 63–88	2–2	15 – Tied	9 – Anya	6 – Swope	T-Mobile Center (4,892); Kansas City, MO
November 25, 2024*; 7:00 p.m., FDSNMWX/ESPN+		Quinnipiac	W 81–67	3–2	30 – Swope	18 – Anya	6 – Swope	Chaifetz Arena (4,225); St. Louis, MO
November 27, 2024*; 7:00 p.m., ESPN+		UMass Lowell	W 93–90	4–2	26 – Swope	10 – Anya	6 – Swope	Chaifetz Arena (4,925); St. Louis, MO
December 2, 2024*; 7:00 p.m., FDSNMW/ESPN+		Jackson State	W 74–66	5–2	21 – Jimerson	11 – Anya	7 – Tied	Chaifetz Arena (3,810); St. Louis, MO
December 5, 2024*; 9:00 p.m., ESPN+		at San Francisco	L 61–78	5–3	16 – Jimerson	7 – Anya	5 – Avila	Sobrato Center; San Francisco, CA
December 8, 2024*; 2:00 p.m., FDSNMW/ESPN+		Chicago State	W 85–62	6–3	19 – Avila	9 – Anya	7 – Swope	Chaifetz Arena (4,815); St. Louis, MO
December 15, 2024*; 4:00 p.m., FDSNMWX/ESPN+		at Illinois State	L 77–81	6–4	28 – Avila	9 – Anya	5 – Anya	CEFCU Arena (4,188); Normal, IL
December 18, 2024*; 7:00 p.m., FDSNMW/ESPN+		Wofford	L 71–74	6–5	19 – Swope	10 – Anya	8 – Avila	Chaifetz Arena (3,679); St. Louis, MO
December 22, 2024*; 3:00 p.m., ESPN+		at Grand Canyon	L 72–73	6–6	17 – Swope	8 – Anya	8 – Swope	Global Credit Union Arena (7,112); Phoenix, AZ
December 28, 2024*; 7:00 p.m., ESPN+		William Woods	W 78–57	7–6	28 – Jimerson	6 – Tied	6 – Avila	Chaifetz Arena (5,139); St. Louis, MO
Atlantic 10 regular season
December 31, 2024; 1:00 p.m., ESPN+		at Fordham	W 88–63	8–6 (1–0)	33 – Jimerson	10 – Anya	4 – Tied	Rose Hill Gymnasium (1,685); Bronx, NY
January 3, 2025; 8:00 p.m., ESPN2		Saint Joseph's	W 73–57	9–6 (2–0)	26 – Swope	15 – Anya	8 – Swope	Chaifetz Arena (6,552); St. Louis, MO
January 8, 2025; 7:00 p.m., Peacock		St. Bonaventure	W 73–68	10–6 (3–0)	28 – Jimerson	9 – Avila	5 – Tied	Chaifetz Arena (5,277); St. Louis, MO
January 14, 2025; 6:00 p.m., FDSNMWX/ESPN+		at VCU	L 62–78	10–7 (3–1)	18 – Tied	8 – Avila	3 – Swope	Siegel Center (7,637); Richmond, VA
January 18, 2025; 1:30 p.m., USA		at Richmond	W 63–59	11–7 (4–1)	24 – Avila	9 – Tied	2 – Tied	Robins Center (5,937); Richmond, VA
January 22, 2025; 7:00 pm, FDSNMW/ESPN+		La Salle	W 64–52	12–7 (5–1)	21 – Avila	13 – Anya	7 – Swope	Chaifetz Arena (5,547); St. Louis, MO
January 25, 2025; 1:00 p.m., ESPN+		at George Washington	L 61–67	12–8 (5–2)	13 – Avila	7 – Jimerson	4 – Tied	Charles E. Smith Center (2,557); Washington, D.C.
January 28, 2025; 7:00 p.m., CBSSN		VCU	W 78–69	13–8 (6–2)	26 – Jimerson	10 – Anya	5 – Anya	Chaifetz Arena (6,763); St. Louis, MO
January 31, 2025; 6:00 p.m., ESPN2		Dayton	L 63–71	13–9 (6–3)	21 – Jimerson	10 – Avila	3 – Tied	Chaifetz Arena (9,819); St. Louis, MO
February 4, 2025; 6:00 p.m., ESPN+		at UMass	W 73–71	14–9 (7–3)	20 – Swope	6 – McCottry	5 – Anya	Mullins Center (3,745); Amherst, MA
February 7, 2025; 8:00 p.m., ESPN2/ESPNU		at Saint Joseph's	L 63–76	14–10 (7–4)	21 – Johnson	5 – Tied	6 – Swope	Hagan Arena (2,201); Philadelphia, PA
February 11, 2025; 7:00 p.m., FDSNMW/ESPN+		George Mason	L 74–76 ^{OT}	14–11 (7–5)	27 – Avila	15 – Anya	5 – Anya	Chaifetz Arena (6,237); St. Louis, MO
February 14, 2025; 6:00 p.m., ESPN2		at Loyola Chicago	L 69–78	14–12 (7–6)	20 – Jimerson	13 – Avila	7 – Avila	Joseph J. Gentile Arena (4,137); Chicago, IL
February 22, 2025; 1:30 p.m., USA		Rhode Island	W 81–66	15–12 (8–6)	22 – Avila	11 – Jimerson	4 – Tied	Chaifetz Arena (7,993); St. Louis, MO
February 25, 2025; 6:00 p.m., FDSNMWX/ESPN+		at Davidson	W 57–56	16–12 (9–6)	23 – Swope	7 – Tied	4 – Johnson	John M. Belk Arena (2,180); Davidson, NC
March 1, 2025; 3:00 p.m., CBSSN		Loyola Chicago	W 98–67	17–12 (10–6)	33 – Jimerson	7 – Tied	5 – Avila	Chaifetz Arena (8,084); St. Louis, MO
March 4, 2025; 6:00 p.m., ESPN+		at Dayton	L 67–75	17–13 (10–7)	28 – Swope	8 – Jimerson	5 – Anya	UD Arena (13,409); Dayton, OH
March 8, 2025; 7:00 p.m., FDSNMWX/ESPN+		Duquesne	W 90–88 ^{OT}	18–13 (11–7)	35 – Jimerson	8 – Jimerson	5 – Tied	Chaifetz Arena (8,421); St. Louis, MO
A-10 tournament
March 13, 2025; 1:00 p.m., USA	(5)	vs. (12) Davidson; Second round	W 83–75	19–13	26 – Swope	11 – Avila	7 – Avila	Capital One Arena (6,203); Washington, D.C.
March 14, 2025; 1:00 p.m., USA	(5)	vs. (4) Loyola Chicago; Quarterfinals	L 64–72	19–14	30 – Swope	6 – Tied	3 – Swope	Capital One Arena (8,153); Washington, D.C.
NIT
March 18, 2025; 8:00 p.m., ESPNU		at (3) Arkansas State; First round – Dallas Region	L 78–103	19–15	22 – Avila	10 – McCottry	3 – McCottry	First National Bank Arena (3,143); Jonesboro, AR
*Non-conference game. ^{#}Rankings from AP Poll. (#) Tournament seedings in parentheses. All times are in Central Time.
