= 2024–25 Dayton Flyers men's basketball team =

American college basketball season

2024–25 Dayton Flyers men's basketball

NIT, Second Round
- Conference: Atlantic 10 Conference
- Record: 23–11 (12–6 A–10)
- Head coach: Anthony Grant (8th season)
- Associate head coach: Ricardo Greer (8th season)
- Assistant coaches: James Kane (5th season); Jermaine Henderson (2nd season); Sean Damaska (2nd season)
- Home arena: UD Arena

2024–25 Atlantic 10 men's basketball standings
	Conf.				Overall
Team	W		L	PCT	W		L	PCT
VCU †	15	–	3	.833	28	–	7	.800
George Mason	15	–	3	.833	27	–	9	.750
Dayton	12	–	6	.667	23	–	11	.676
Loyola Chicago	12	–	6	.667	25	–	12	.676
Saint Louis	11	–	7	.611	19	–	15	.559
Saint Joseph's	11	–	7	.611	22	–	13	.629
George Washington	9	–	9	.500	21	–	13	.618
St. Bonaventure	9	–	9	.500	22	–	12	.647
Duquesne	8	–	10	.444	13	–	19	.406
Rhode Island	7	–	11	.389	18	–	13	.581
UMass	7	–	11	.389	12	–	20	.375
Davidson	6	–	12	.333	17	–	16	.515
Richmond	5	–	13	.278	10	–	22	.313
La Salle	5	–	13	.278	14	–	19	.424
Fordham	3	–	15	.167	12	–	21	.364
† 2025 A-10 tournament winner

The 2024–25 Dayton Flyers men's basketball team represented the University of Dayton in the 2024–25 NCAA Division I men's basketball season. They were led by head coach Anthony Grant in his eighth season with the Flyers. The Flyers played their home games at UD Arena in Dayton, Ohio as members of the Atlantic 10 Conference (A-10).

The Dayton Flyers drew an average home attendance of 13,407, the 20th-highest of all college basketball teams.

== Previous season ==
The Flyers finished the 2023–24 season 25–8, 14–4 in A-10 play to finish in third place. They lost in the quarterfinals of the A-10 tournament to Duquesne. They received an at-large bid to the NCAA tournament as No. 7 seed in the West Region where they defeated Nevada in the first round before losing to Arizona in the second round.

== Offseason ==
=== Departures ===
Name	Number	Pos.	Height	Weight	Year	Hometown	Reason for departure
Koby Brea	4	G	6'6"	205	Junior	Washington Heights, NY	Transferred to Kentucky
Petras Padegimas	12	F	6'8"	215	Freshman	Kaunas, Lithuania	Transferred to Mercer
DaRon Holmes II	15	F	6'10"	235	Junior	Goodyear, AZ	Declare for 2024 NBA draft; selected 22nd overall by Phoenix Suns
CJ Napier	22	F	6'6"	215	GS Senior	Miamisburg, OH	Walk-on; graduated
Kobe Elvis	24	G	6'2"	180	Junior	Brampton, ON	Transferred to Oklahoma
Zimi Nwokeji	45	F	6'7"	215	(redshirt) Junior	Quincy, FL	Transferred to Jacksonville

=== Incoming transfers ===
Name	Number	Pos.	Height	Weight	Year	Hometown	Previous school
Posh Alexander	5	G	6'0"	205	RS Senior	Brooklyn, NY	Butler
Zed Key	23	F	6'8"	245	GS Senior	Bay Shore, NY	Ohio State
Jacob Conner	24	G/F	6'10"	209	Junior	Dayton, OH	Marshall

=== Recruiting classes ===
==== 2024 recruiting class ====
College recruiting information
Name	Hometown	School	Height	Weight	Commit date
Hamad Mousa; SF	Doha, Qatar	NBA Global Academy	6 ft 8 in (2.03 m)	190 lb (86 kg)	May 29, 2024
Hamad Mousa; SF	Recruit ratings: Rivals: 247Sports: ESPN: (NR)				
Amaël L'Etang; C	Toulouse, France	Cholet Basket	7 ft 1 in (2.16 m)	230 lb (100 kg)	Jun 11, 2024
Amaël L'Etang; C	Recruit ratings: Rivals: 247Sports: ESPN: (NR)				
Overall recruit ranking:
Note: In many cases, Scout, Rivals, 247Sports, On3, and ESPN may conflict in their listings of height and weight.; In these cases, the average was taken. ESPN grades are on a 100-point scale.; Sources: "Dayton 2024 Basketball Commitments". Rivals.; "Dayton Flyers 2024 Player Commits". ESPN.; "2024 Team Ranking". Rivals.

==== 2025 recruiting class ====
College recruiting information (2025)
Name	Hometown	School	Height	Weight	Commit date
Jaron McKie #17 PG	Philadelphia, PA	St. Joseph's Prep School	6 ft 2 in (1.88 m)	180 lb (82 kg)	Sep 14, 2024
Jaron McKie #17 PG	Recruit ratings: Rivals: 247Sports: ESPN: (82)				
Damon Friery #21 PF	Cleveland, OH	Saint Ignatius High School	6 ft 9 in (2.06 m)	205 lb (93 kg)	Sep 9, 2024
Damon Friery #21 PF	Recruit ratings: Rivals: 247Sports: ESPN: (81)				
Overall recruit ranking:
Note: In many cases, Scout, Rivals, 247Sports, On3, and ESPN may conflict in their listings of height and weight.; In these cases, the average was taken. ESPN grades are on a 100-point scale.; Sources: "Dayton 2025 Basketball Commitments". Rivals.; "Dayton Flyers 2025 Player Commits". ESPN.; "2025 Team Ranking". Rivals.

== Roster ==
2024–25 Dayton Flyers men's basketball team
Players
Coaches

Pos.	#	Name	Height	Weight	Year	Previous school	Hometown
G	0	Javon Bennett	5 ft 10 in (1.78 m)	160 lb (73 kg)	Jr	Merrimack	Orlando, FL
F	2	Nate Santos	6 ft 7 in (2.01 m)	215 lb (98 kg)	Sr	Pittsburgh	Geneva, IL
F	3	Jaiun Simon	6 ft 6 in (1.98 m)	225 lb (102 kg)	RS Fr	Pebblebrook High School	Mableton, GA
G	5	Posh Alexander	6 ft 0 in (1.83 m)	205 lb (93 kg)	RS Sr	Butler	Brooklyn, NY
G	6	Enoch Cheeks	6 ft 3 in (1.91 m)	195 lb (88 kg)	Sr	Robert Morris	Providence, RI
G	7	Evan Dickey (W)	6 ft 3 in (1.91 m)	190 lb (86 kg)	So	Chaminade Julienne High School	Dayton, OH
G	8	Marvel Allen	6 ft 4 in (1.93 m)	205 lb (93 kg)	RS Fr	Montverde Academy	Fort Lauderdale, FL
G/F	10	Hamad Mousa	6 ft 8 in (2.03 m)	190 lb (86 kg)	Fr	NBA Global Academy	Doha, Qatar
G	11	Malachi Smith	6 ft 0 in (1.83 m)	175 lb (79 kg)	RS Jr	St. Raymond High School for Boys	The Bronx, NY
F	13	Isaac Jack	6 ft 11 in (2.11 m)	250 lb (113 kg)	Jr	Buffalo	Port Alberni, BC
G	21	Brady Uhl	6 ft 2 in (1.88 m)	205 lb (93 kg)	Sr	Cumberlands	Dayton, OH
F	23	Zed Key	6 ft 8 in (2.03 m)	220 lb (100 kg)	GS	Ohio State	Bay Shore, NY
F	24	Jacob Conner	6 ft 10 in (2.08 m)	205 lb (93 kg)	Jr	Marshall	Dayton, OH
G	25	Will Maxwell (W)	6 ft 4 in (1.93 m)	210 lb (95 kg)	So	Oakwood High School	Oakwood, OH
F	29	Amaël L'Etang	7 ft 1 in (2.16 m)	230 lb (104 kg)	Fr	Cholet	Toulouse, France
G	33	Makai Grant (W)	6 ft 1 in (1.85 m)	195 lb (88 kg)	So	Chaminade Julienne High School	Dayton, OH
G/F	54	Atticus Schuler (W)	6 ft 6 in (1.98 m)	200 lb (91 kg)	So	St. Francis DeSales High School	Westerville, OH

Head coach

- Anthony Grant (Dayton)

Assistant coach(es)

- Ricardo Greer (Pittsburgh)
- James Kane (Florida)
- Jermaine Henderson (Miami (OH))
- Sean Damaska (Northern Illinois)

Legend

- (C) Team captain
- (S) Suspended
- (I) Ineligible
- (W) Walk-on
- Injured
- Current redshirt

Roster

== Schedule and results ==
Date time, TV	Rank^{#}	Opponent^{#}	Result	Record	High points	High rebounds	High assists	Site (attendance) city, state
Exhibition
October 20, 2024*; 5:00 p.m., BSOH		Xavier; CareSource Exhibition Game /Blackburn/McCafferty Trophy	L 74–98	–	13 – Santos	4 – L'Etang	3 – Tied	UD Arena (13,407); Dayton, OH
October 26, 2024*; 6:00 p.m.		Ashland	W 65–56	–	20 – Santos	8 – Cheeks	3 – Cheeks	UD Arena (13,407); Dayton, OH
Non-conference regular season
November 4, 2024*; 7:00 p.m., ESPN+		Saint Francis (PA)	W 87–57	1–0	14 – Key	10 – Cheeks	6 – Smith	UD Arena (13,407); Dayton, OH
November 9, 2024*; 7:30 p.m., WHIO-TV/ESPN+		Northwestern	W 71–66	2–0	16 – Tied	6 – Santos	6 – Smith	UD Arena (13,407); Dayton, OH
November 13, 2024*; 7:00 p.m., ESPN+		Ball State	W 77–69	3–0	23 – Cheeks	12 – Cheeks	10 – Smith	UD Arena (13,407); Dayton, OH
November 16, 2024*; 7:00 p.m., ESPN+		Capital	W 76–55	4–0	16 – Bennett	10 – L'Etang	5 – Bennett	UD Arena (13,407); Dayton, OH
November 20, 2024*; 7:00 p.m., ESPN+		New Mexico State	W 74–53	5–0	23 – Santos	8 – Santos	6 – Bennett	UD Arena (13,407); Dayton, OH
November 25, 2024*; 11:30 p.m., ESPN2		vs. No. 12 North Carolina; Maui Invitational quarterfinals	L 90–92	5–1	15 – Santos	8 – Cheeks	6 – Alexander	Lahaina Civic Center (2,400); Lahaina, HI
November 26, 2024*; 8:30 p.m., ESPNU		vs. No. 5 Iowa State; Maui Invitational consolation 2nd round	L 84–89	5–2	22 – Smith	6 – Cheeks	9 – Smith	Lahaina Civic Center (2,400); Lahaina, HI
November 28, 2024*; 12:00 a.m., ESPN2		vs. No. 2 UConn; Maui Invitational 7th place game	W 85–67	6–2	20 – Cheeks	9 – Key	6 – Alexander	Lahaina Civic Center (2,400); Lahaina, HI
December 3, 2024*; 7:00 p.m., ESPN+		Western Michigan	W 77–69	7–2	23 – Cheeks	8 – Cheeks	5 – Smith	UD Arena (13,407); Dayton, OH
December 7, 2024*; 2:00 p.m., WHIO-TV		Lehigh	W 86–62	8–2	24 – Santos	6 – Cheeks	9 – Smith	UD Arena (13,407); Dayton, OH
December 14, 2024*; 7:00 p.m., CBSSN		No. 6 Marquette	W 71–63	9–2	15 – Tied	13 – Santos	11 – Smith	UD Arena (13,407); Dayton, OH
December 17, 2024*; 7:00 p.m., Peacock	No. 22	UNLV	W 66–65	10–2	14 – Santos	10 – Cheeks	6 – Cheeks	UD Arena (13,407); Dayton, OH
December 20, 2024*; 8:30 p.m., ESPNU	No. 22	vs. No. 19 Cincinnati; Simple Truth Hoops Classic	L 59–66	10–3	13 – Tied	6 – Tied	5 – Smith	Heritage Bank Center (15,107); Cincinnati, OH
Atlantic 10 regular season
December 31, 2024; 2:00 p.m., ESPN+		La Salle	W 84–70	11–3 (1–0)	20 – Smith	5 – Tied	6 – Smith	UD Arena (13,407); Dayton, OH
January 4, 2025; 12:00 p.m., USA		at George Washington	L 62–82	11–4 (1–1)	23 – Santos	11 – Cheeks	5 – Smith	Charles E. Smith Center (3,035); Washington, D.C.
January 8, 2025; 7:00 p.m., Peacock		at UMass	L 72–76	11–5 (1–2)	18 – Santos	6 – Smith	3 – Smith	Mullins Center (2,373); Amherst, MA
January 15, 2025; 7:00 p.m., CBSSN		George Mason	L 59–67	11–6 (1–3)	20 – Santos	6 – L'Etang	5 – Smith	UD Arena (13,407); Dayton, OH
January 18, 2025; 4:00 p.m., CBSSN		Loyola Chicago	W 83–81 ^{OT}	12–6 (2–3)	26 – Cheeks	7 – Tied	8 – Smith	UD Arena (13,407); Dayton, OH
January 21, 2025; 7:00 p.m., ESPN+		at Duquesne	W 82–62	13–6 (3–3)	23 – Cheeks	6 – Tied	9 – Smith	UPMC Cooper Fieldhouse (3,218); Pittsburgh, PA
January 24, 2025; 7:30 p.m., ESPN2		Saint Joseph's	W 77–72	14–6 (4–3)	24 – Santos	8 – Santos	8 – Smith	UD Arena (13,407); Dayton, OH
January 28, 2025; 8:00 p.m., ESPN+		at St. Bonaventure	L 53–75	14–7 (4–4)	12 – Santos	7 – Santos	4 – Tied	Reilly Center (3,929); St. Bonaventure, NY
January 31, 2025; 7:00 p.m., ESPN2		at Saint Louis	W 71–63	15–7 (5–4)	19 – Bennett	8 – L'Etang	5 – Alexander	Chaifetz Arena (9,819); St. Louis, MO
February 4, 2025; 7:00 p.m., ESPN+		Davidson	W 69–63	16–7 (6–4)	13 – Tied	13 – L'Etang	5 – Alexander	UD Arena (13,407); Dayton, OH
February 7, 2025; 7:00 p.m., ESPN2		VCU	L 68–73	16–8 (6–5)	18 – Santos	7 – Santos	4 – Tied	UD Arena (13,407); Dayton, OH
February 12, 2025; 7:00 p.m., ESPN+		at Fordham	W 93–76	17–8 (7–5)	18 – Smith	6 – Cheeks	5 – Smith	Rose Hill Gymnasium (1,651); Bronx, NY
February 15, 2025; 2:30 p.m., USA		Duquesne	W 77–76	18–8 (8–5)	19 – Cheeks	6 – Key	3 – Smith	UD Arena (13,407); Dayton, OH
February 21, 2025; 7:00 p.m., ESPN2		at Loyola Chicago	L 72–76	18–9 (8–6)	18 – Santos	7 – Cheeks	5 – Smith	Joseph J. Gentile Arena (4,557); Chicago, IL
February 26, 2025; 7:00 p.m., CBSSN		at Rhode Island	W 85–77	19–9 (9–6)	17 – Santos	8 – Cheeks	6 – Smith	Ryan Center (4,782); Kingston, RI
March 1, 2025; 2:00 p.m., CBSSN		Richmond	W 74–64 ^{2OT}	20–9 (10–6)	18 – Tied	11 – Cheeks	4 – Smith	UD Arena (13,407); Dayton, OH
March 4, 2025; 7:00 p.m., ESPN+		Saint Louis	W 75–67	21–9 (11–6)	17 – Cheeks	9 – Cheeks	5 – Bennett	UD Arena (13,409); Dayton, OH
March 7, 2025; 7:00 p.m., ESPN2		at VCU	W 79–76	22–9 (12–6)	22 – Bennett	6 – Santos	7 – Smith	Siegel Center (7,637); Richmond, VA
A-10 tournament
March 14, 2025; 7:30 p.m., Peacock	(3)	vs. (6) Saint Joseph's; Quarterfinals	L 68–73 ^{OT}	22–10	15 – Tied	15 – Santos	5 – Smith	Capital One Arena (8,766); Washington, D.C.
NIT
March 19, 2025; 7:00 p.m., ESPN2	(1)	at Florida Atlantic; First round – Dayton Region	W 86–79	23–10	30 – Bennett	5 – Smith	4 – Cheeks	Eleanor R. Baldwin Arena (1,846); Boca Raton, FL
March 22, 2025; 11:30 a.m., ESPN2	(1)	at Chattanooga; Second round – Dayton Region	L 72–87	23–11	18 – Santos	6 – Santos	7 – Smith	McKenzie Arena (2,633); Chattanooga, TN
*Non-conference game. ^{#}Rankings from AP poll. (#) Tournament seedings in parentheses. All times are in Eastern Time.

== Rankings ==
Ranking movements Legend: ██ Increase in ranking ██ Decrease in ranking — = Not ranked RV = Received votes
	Week																				
Poll	Pre	1	2	3	4	5	6	7	8	9	10	11	12	13	14	15	16	17	18	19	Final
AP	—	RV	—	—	RV	RV	22	RV	RV	RV	—	—	—	—	—	—	—	—	—	—	—
Coaches	RV	RV	RV	RV	RV	RV	24	RV	RV	—	—	—	—	—	—	—	—	—	—	—	—
