= 2024–25 Loyola Ramblers men's basketball team =

American college basketball season

2024–25 Loyola Ramblers men's basketball

NIT, Semifinals
- Conference: Atlantic 10 Conference
- Record: 25–12 (12–6 A–10)
- Head coach: Drew Valentine (4th season)
- Associate head coach: Sean Dwyer
- Assistant coaches: Justin Bradley; Andrew Cobian; Chris Huey; Keith Clemons
- Home arena: Joseph J. Gentile Arena

2024–25 Atlantic 10 men's basketball standings
	Conf.				Overall
Team	W		L	PCT	W		L	PCT
VCU †	15	–	3	.833	28	–	7	.800
George Mason	15	–	3	.833	27	–	9	.750
Dayton	12	–	6	.667	23	–	11	.676
Loyola Chicago	12	–	6	.667	25	–	12	.676
Saint Louis	11	–	7	.611	19	–	15	.559
Saint Joseph's	11	–	7	.611	22	–	13	.629
George Washington	9	–	9	.500	21	–	13	.618
St. Bonaventure	9	–	9	.500	22	–	12	.647
Duquesne	8	–	10	.444	13	–	19	.406
Rhode Island	7	–	11	.389	18	–	13	.581
UMass	7	–	11	.389	12	–	20	.375
Davidson	6	–	12	.333	17	–	16	.515
Richmond	5	–	13	.278	10	–	22	.313
La Salle	5	–	13	.278	14	–	19	.424
Fordham	3	–	15	.167	12	–	21	.364
† 2025 A-10 tournament winner

The 2024–25 Loyola Ramblers men's basketball team represented Loyola University Chicago during the 2024–25 NCAA Division I men's basketball season. The Ramblers, led by fourth-year head coach Drew Valentine, played their home games at the Joseph J. Gentile Arena in Chicago, Illinois as third-year members of the Atlantic 10 Conference (A-10).

This proved to be the final season for team chaplain Sister Jean, who retired shortly before the 2025–26 season at age 106 for health reasons and died less than a month after retiring.

== Previous season ==
The Ramblers finished 2023–24 season 23–10, 15–3 in A-10 play, to finish in a tie for the regular-season championship. As the No. 2 seed in the A-10 tournament, they lost to St. Bonaventure in the quarterfinals. They received a bid to the National Invitation Tournament where they lost to Bradley in the first round.

== Offseason ==
=== Departures ===
Name	Number	Pos.	Height	Weight	Year	Hometown	Reason for departure
Branden Norris	4	G	6' 0"	180	GS Senior	Hilliard, OH	Graduated
Trey Lewis	5	G	6' 6"	200	(redshirt) Freshman	Ferndale, MI	Transferred to Purdue Fort Wayne
Tom Welch	10	F	6' 8"	220	GS Senior	Naperville, IL	Graduated
Greg Dolan	12	G	6' 3"	188	Senior	Williamsville, NY	Graduated
Philip Alston	23	F	6' 6"	235	Junior	Columbus, OH	Declared for 2024 NBA draft (went undrafted); signed with the Milwaukee Bucks
Patrick Mwamba	30	F	6' 7"	210	GS Senior	Kinshasa, Congo	Graduated
Will Smythe	31	G	6' 4"	170	(redshirt) Sophomore	Rochester Hills, MI	Walk-on; left the team due to personal reasons
Dame Adelekun	32	F	6' 8"	230	GS Senior	Gastonia, NC	Graduated
Ben Schwieger	33	G/F	6' 7"	205	(redshirt) Sophomore	Aurora, IL	Transferred to Northern Iowa

=== Incoming transfers ===
Name	Number	Pos.	Height	Weight	Year	Hometown	Previous school
Jalen DeLoach	4	F	6' 9"	220	Senior	Savannah, GA	Georgia
Justin Moore	8	G	6' 3"	187	Junior	Philadelphia, PA	Drexel
Kymany Houinsou	28	G	6' 6"	205	Junior	Mulhouse, France	Washington State
Francis Nwaokorie	35	F	6' 7"	220	Senior	Brooklyn Park, MN	UC San Diego

=== Recruiting classes ===
==== 2024 recruiting class ====
College recruiting information
Name	Hometown	School	Height	Weight	Commit date
Jack Turner; SG	Bellflower, CA	St. John Bosco High School	6 ft 8 in (2.03 m)	210 lb (95 kg)	Oct 25, 2022
Jack Turner; SG	Recruit ratings: Rivals: 247Sports: ESPN: (NR)				
Brayden Young; C	Houston, TX	Cy Falls High School	6 ft 9 in (2.06 m)	205 lb (93 kg)	Oct 19, 2023
Brayden Young; C	Recruit ratings: Rivals: 247Sports: ESPN: (NR)				
Daniil Glazkov; SG	Krasnodar, Russia	IMG Academy	6 ft 4 in (1.93 m)	195 lb (88 kg)	Feb 18, 2024
Daniil Glazkov; SG	Recruit ratings: Rivals: 247Sports: ESPN: (NR)				
Seifeldin Hendawy; SF	Cairo, Egypt	NBA Academy Africa	6 ft 7 in (2.01 m)	185 lb (84 kg)	Feb 15, 2024
Seifeldin Hendawy; SF	Recruit ratings: Rivals: 247Sports: ESPN: (NR)				
Overall recruit ranking:
Note: In many cases, Scout, Rivals, 247Sports, On3, and ESPN may conflict in their listings of height and weight.; In these cases, the average was taken. ESPN grades are on a 100-point scale.; Sources: "2024 Loyola Ramblers Recruiting Class". ESPN.; "2024 Team Ranking". Rivals.

==== 2025 recruiting class ====
College recruiting information (2025)
Name	Hometown	School	Height	Weight	Commit date
Chuck Love #14 SF	Lincoln, NE	La Lumiere School	6 ft 7 in (2.01 m)	195 lb (88 kg)	Sep 10, 2024
Chuck Love #14 SF	Recruit ratings: Rivals: 247Sports: ESPN: (82)				
Nic Anderson; SG	Olathe, KS	Olathe South High School	6 ft 4 in (1.93 m)	180 lb (82 kg)	Jul 16, 2024
Nic Anderson; SG	Recruit ratings: Rivals: 247Sports: ESPN: (NR)				
Overall recruit ranking:
Note: In many cases, Scout, Rivals, 247Sports, On3, and ESPN may conflict in their listings of height and weight.; In these cases, the average was taken. ESPN grades are on a 100-point scale.; Sources: "2025 Loyola Ramblers Recruiting Class". ESPN.; "2025 Team Ranking". Rivals.

== Roster ==
2024–25 Loyola Ramblers men's basketball team
Players
Coaches

Pos.	#	Name	Height	Weight	Year	Previous school	Hometown
G/F	0	Desmond Watson	6 ft 5 in (1.96 m)	210 lb (95 kg)	Sr	St. Francis DeSales; Davidson	Columbus, OH
G	1	Jayden Dawson	6 ft 4 in (1.93 m)	195 lb (88 kg)	Jr	Omaha Central	Omaha, NE
G	2	Jalen Quinn	6 ft 3 in (1.91 m)	195 lb (88 kg)	So	Tuscola	Tuscola, IL
F	4	Jalen DeLoach	6 ft 9 in (2.06 m)	225 lb (102 kg)	Sr	The Skill Factory; Georgia	Savannah, GA
G	5	Daniil Glazkov	6 ft 6 in (1.98 m)	205 lb (93 kg)	Fr	IMG Academy	Krasnodar, Russia
G	8	Justin Moore	6 ft 3 in (1.91 m)	185 lb (84 kg)	Jr	Archbishop Wood; Drexel	Philadelphia, PA
G	9	Seifeldin Hendawy	6 ft 8 in (2.03 m)	200 lb (91 kg)	Fr	NBA Academy Africa	Cairo, Egypt
G	10	Jack Turner	6 ft 3 in (1.91 m)	165 lb (75 kg)	Fr	St. John Bosco	Los Angeles, CA
G	13	Sheldon Jr. Edwards	6 ft 4 in (1.93 m)	190 lb (86 kg)	GS	TLAP Sports Academy; Valparaiso	West Palm Beach, FL
G	14	Caleb Reese (W)	5 ft 11 in (1.8 m)	160 lb (73 kg)	Jr	De La Salle	Warren, MI
G	22	Sam Yurasek (W)	6 ft 3 in (1.91 m)	165 lb (75 kg)	So	Prolific Prep	Napa, CA
C	24	Miles Rubin	6 ft 10 in (2.08 m)	210 lb (95 kg)	So	Simeon	Chicago, IL
G	28	Kymany Houinsou	6 ft 7 in (2.01 m)	205 lb (93 kg)	Jr	Asvel; Washington State	Mulhouse, France
F	30	Brayden Young	6 ft 9 in (2.06 m)	195 lb (88 kg)	Fr	Cypress Falls	Houston, TX
F	31	Zachary Royster (W)	6 ft 7 in (2.01 m)	220 lb (100 kg)	Jr	Lindblom	Chicago, IL
F	34	Matthew Mortenson (W)	6 ft 4 in (1.93 m)	215 lb (98 kg)	So	IMG Academy	Plano, TX
F	35	Francis Nwaokorie	6 ft 7 in (2.01 m)	220 lb (100 kg)	Sr	Champlin Park; UC San Diego	Brooklyn Park, MN

Head coach

- Drew Valentine (Oakland)

Assistant coach(es)

- Sean Dwyer (Michigan State)
- Justin Bradley (Guilford)
- Andrew Cobian (Centenary)
- Chris Huey (Kansas)
- Keith Clemons (Loyola Chicago)

Legend

- (C) Team captain
- (S) Suspended
- (I) Ineligible
- (W) Walk-on
- Injured
- Current redshirt

Roster
Last update: March 2, 2025

== Schedule and results ==
Date time, TV	Rank^{#}	Opponent^{#}	Result	Record	High points	High rebounds	High assists	Site (attendance) city, state
Exhibition
October 29, 2024*; 7:00 p.m.		Calumet St. Joseph	W 87–57	–	16 – Moore	9 – 2 tied	6 – Watson	Joseph J. Gentile Arena (2,217); Chicago, IL
Non-conference regular season
November 4, 2024*; 7:30 p.m., ESPN+		Chicago State	W 79–72	1–0	20 – Dawson	9 – Nwaokorie	7 – Moore	Joseph J. Gentile Arena (2,626); Chicago, IL
November 7, 2024*; 7:00 p.m., ESPN+		Detroit Mercy	W 87–65	2–0	13 – Edwards Jr.	6 – Moore	6 – Moore	Joseph J. Gentile Arena (2,240); Chicago, IL
November 10, 2024*; 1:00 p.m., ESPN+		Eureka	W 105–53	3–0	17 – Edwards Jr.	6 – Houinsou	4 – Moore	Joseph J. Gentile Arena (2,279); Chicago, IL
November 15, 2024*; 6:00 p.m., ESPN+		at Princeton	W 73–68	4–0	17 – Dawson	13 – Rubin	4 – Watson	Jadwin Gymnasium (2,472); Princeton, NJ
November 19, 2024*; 7:30 p.m., ESPN+		Southern Utah	W 76–72	5–0	12 – Watson	7 – Nwaokorie	7 – Moore	Joseph J. Gentile Arena (2,318); Chicago, IL
November 23, 2024*; 5:30 p.m., ESPN+		Tulsa	W 89–53	6–0	19 – Watson	8 – Houinsou	7 – Houinsou	Joseph J. Gentile Arena (3,055); Chicago, IL
December 3, 2024*; 7:30 p.m., ESPN+		Eastern Michigan	W 76–54	7–0	24 – Watson	10 – Rubin	8 – Moore	Joseph J. Gentile Arena; Chicago, IL
December 7, 2024*; 11:30 a.m., USA		South Florida	W 74–72	8–0	14 – Watson	7 – 2 tied	5 – Houinsou	Joseph J. Gentile Arena (3,124); Chicago, IL
December 15, 2024*; 5:00 p.m., ESPN+		vs. San Francisco; Milwaukee Tip-Off	L 66–76	8–1	14 – Watson	8 – DeLoach	4 – Houinsou	Fiserv Forum (3,278); Milwaukee, WI
December 18, 2024*; 7:00 p.m., Marquee		Canisius	W 72–60	9–1	22 – Edwards Jr.	8 – 2 tied	6 – 2 tied	Joseph J. Gentile Arena (1,965); Chicago, IL
December 22, 2024*; 4:30 p.m., ESPNU		vs. Oakland; Diamond Head Classic quarterfinals	L 71–72	9–2	21 – Rubin	9 – Rubin	5 – Watson	Stan Sheriff Center; Honolulu, HI
December 23, 2024*; 4:30 p.m., ESPNU		vs. Charleston; Diamond Head Classic consolation 2nd round	L 68–77	9–3	17 – Quinn	14 – Nwaokorie	4 – Watson	Stan Sheriff Center; Honolulu, HI
December 25, 2024*; 12:30 p.m., ESPNU		vs. Murray State; Diamond Head Classic 7th-place game	L 68–71	9–4	16 – Rubin	5 – 2 tied	2 – 2 tied	Stan Sheriff Center; Honolulu, HI
Atlantic 10 regular season
January 4, 2025; 1:00 p.m., CBSSN		VCU	L 65–84	9–5 (0–1)	20 – Watson	8 – DeLoach	7 – Quinn	Joseph J. Gentile Center (4,129); Chicago, IL
January 8, 2025; 5:30 p.m., ESPN+		at La Salle	W 79–68	10–5 (1–1)	20 – 2 tied	6 – Dawson	3 – 2 tied	Tom Gola Arena (1,082); Philadelphia, PA
January 11, 2025; 2:00 p.m., CBSSN		at Saint Joseph's	L 57–93	10–6 (1–2)	12 – Edwards Jr.	7 – Nwaokorie	4 – Watson	Hagan Arena (3,013); Philadelphia, PA
January 15, 2025; 8:00 p.m., CBSSN		Rhode Island	W 81–77	11–6 (2–2)	21 – Watson	5 – 2 tied	6 – DeLoach	Joseph J. Gentile Arena (2,523); Chicago, IL
January 18, 2025; 3:00 p.m., CBSSN		at Dayton	L 81–83 ^{OT}	11–7 (2–3)	19 – 2 tied	6 – Edwards Jr.	4 – 2 tied	UD Arena (13,407); Dayton, OH
January 22, 2025; 7:00 p.m., Marquee		Fordham	W 70–66	12–7 (3–3)	13 – Edwards Jr.	6 – 2 tied	7 – Edwards Jr.	Joseph J. Gentile Arena (2,780); Chicago, IL
January 29, 2025; 6:00 p.m., ESPN+		at George Mason	L 53–58 ^{OT}	12–8 (3–4)	11 – Nwaokorie	8 – Edwards Jr.	7 – Dawson	EagleBank Arena (3,423); Fairfax, VA
February 1, 2025; 1:00 p.m., CBSSN		Saint Joseph's	W 58–55	13–8 (4–4)	12 – Edwards Jr.	6 – Edwards Jr.	3 – 2 tied	Joseph J. Gentile Arena (4,427); Chicago, IL
February 4, 2025; 8:00 p.m., CBSSN		St. Bonaventure	W 77–53	14–8 (5–4)	17 – Watson	9 – Rubin	6 – Quinn	Joseph J. Gentile Arena (2,553); Chicago, IL
February 8, 2025; 5:00 p.m., CBSSN		at Duquesne	L 56–69	14–9 (5–5)	14 – Watson	7 – Dawson	3 – Houinsou	UPMC Cooper Fieldhouse (2,577); Pittsburgh, PA
February 11, 2025; 6:00 p.m., ESPN+		at Richmond	W 87–80 ^{OT}	15–9 (6–5)	24 – Dawson	10 – Rubin	6 – Houinsou	Robins Center (4,470); Richmond, VA
February 14, 2025; 6:00 p.m., ESPN2		Saint Louis	W 78–69	16–9 (7–5)	26 – Dawson	11 – Rubin	6 – Rubin	Joseph J. Gentile Arena (4,137); Chicago, IL
February 18, 2025; 6:00 p.m., CBSSN		at Davidson	W 77–69	17–9 (8–5)	24 – Dawson	8 – 2 tied	4 – Quinn	John M. Belk Arena (2,391); Davidson, NC
February 21, 2025; 6:00 p.m., ESPN2		Dayton	W 76–72	18–9 (9–5)	22 – Watson	6 – 2 tied	6 – Houinsou	Joseph J. Gentile Arena (4,557); Chicago, IL
February 26, 2025; 7:00 p.m., Marquee		George Washington	W 77–57	19–9 (10–5)	16 – Dawson	8 – Nwaokorie	6 – Edwards Jr.	Joseph J. Gentile Arena (2,751); Chicago, IL
March 1, 2025; 3:00 p.m., CBSSN		at Saint Louis	L 67–98	19–10 (10–6)	16 – Ruben	5 – Team	2 – Watson	Chaifetz Arena (8,084); St. Louis, MO
March 5, 2025; 8:00 p.m., CBSSN		Davidson	W 82–72	20–10 (11–6)	22 – Edwards Jr.	10 – Edwards Jr.	5 – Quinn	Joseph J. Gentile Arena (3,010); Chicago, IL
March 8, 2025; 11:30 a.m., USA		at UMass	W 74–51	21–10 (12–6)	17 – Dawson	10 – Houinsou	10 – Houinsou	Mullins Center (3,484); Amherst, MA
A-10 tournament
March 14, 2025; 1:00 p.m., USA	(4)	vs. (5) Saint Louis; Quarterfinals	W 72–64	22–10	25 – Watson	10 – Houinsou	3 – DeLoach	Capital One Arena (8,153); Washington, D.C.
March 15, 2025; 12:00 p.m., CBSSN	(4)	vs. (1) VCU; Semifinals	L 55–62	22–11	12 – 2 tied	8 – 3 tied	4 – Watson	Capital One Arena; Washington, D.C.
NIT
March 19, 2025; 10:00 p.m., ESPN2		at (4) San Jose State; First round – San Francisco Region	W 73–70	23–11	24 – Watson	9 – Nwaokorie	3 – Tied	Provident Credit Union Event Center (3,627); San Jose, CA
March 23, 2025; 6:00 p.m., ESPN2		at (1) San Francisco; Second round – San Francisco Region	W 77–76	24–11	35 – Dawson	8 – Edwards Jr.	4 – Quinn	Sobrato Center (1,624); San Francisco, CA
March 26, 2025; 6:00 p.m., ESPN2		Kent State; Quarterfinals – San Francisco Region	W 72–62	25–11	18 – Rubin	9 – Rubin	5 – Edwards Jr.	Joseph J. Gentile Arena (3,554); Chicago, IL
April 1, 2025; 9:30 p.m., ESPN2		vs. Chattanooga; Semifinals	L 73–80	25–12	19 – Dawson	6 – Tied	6 – Dawson	Hinkle Fieldhouse (3,288); Indianapolis, IN
*Non-conference game. ^{#}Rankings from AP poll. (#) Tournament seedings in parentheses. All times are in Central.
