= Josh Schertz =

American basketball coach (born 1975)

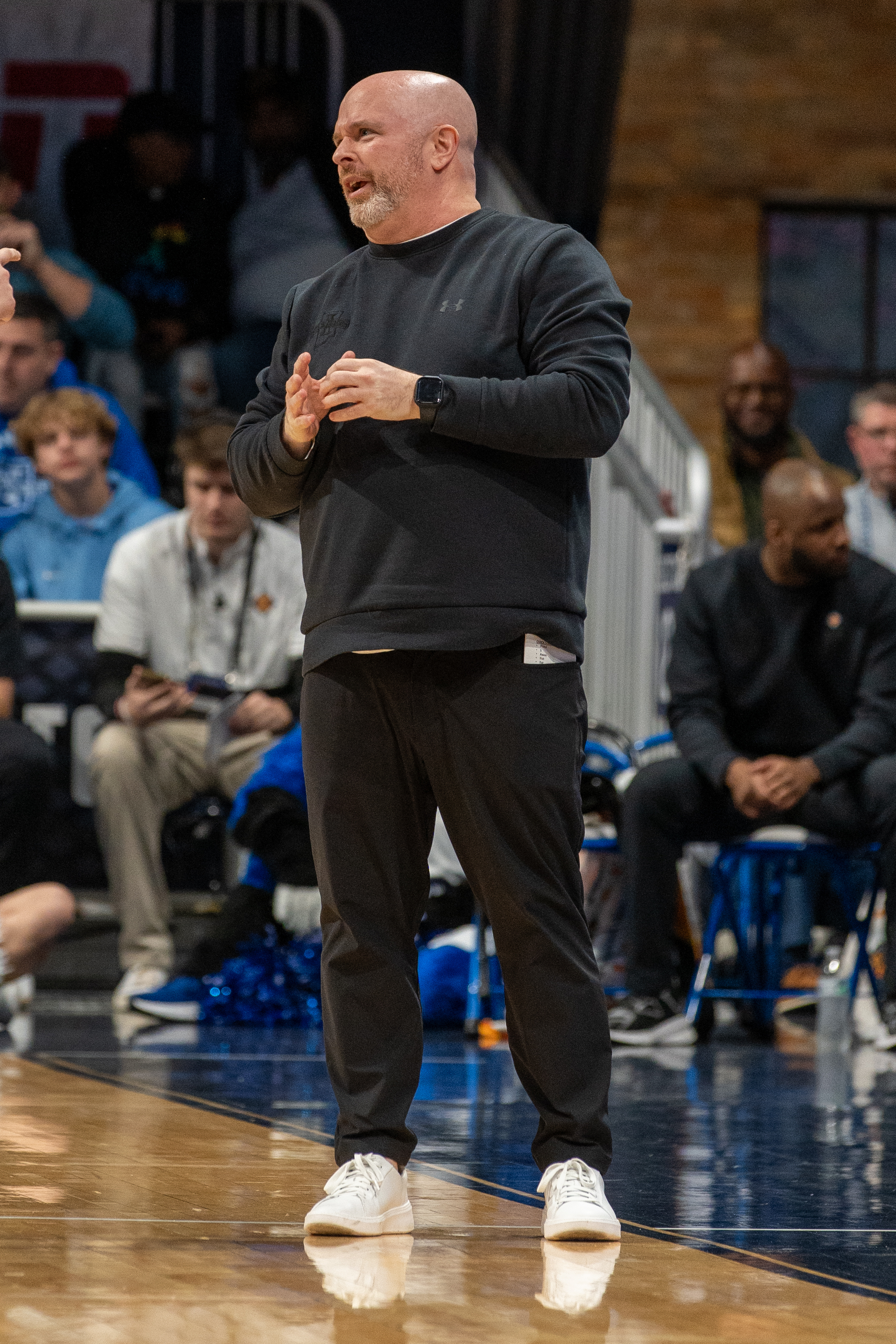
- Schertz in 2024

Current position
- Title: Head coach
- Team: Saint Louis
- Conference: Atlantic 10
- Record: 50–21 (.704)

Biographical details
- Born: July 5, 1975 (age 51); Brooklyn, New York, U.S.
- Education: Florida Atlantic (2000)

Coaching career (HC unless noted)
- 1999–2001: Lynn (assistant)
- 2001–2003: Queens (NC) (associate HC)
- 2003–2008: High Point (associate HC)
- 2008–2021: Lincoln Memorial
- 2021–2024: Indiana State
- 2024–present: Saint Louis

Head coaching record
- Overall: 453–130 (.777)
- Tournaments: 1–1 (NCAA Division I); 18–9 (NCAA Division II); 4–2 (NIT); 1–1 (CBI)

Accomplishments and honors

Championships
- 5 SAC tournament (2011, 2014, 2016, 2018, 2020); 9 SAC regular season (2011, 2013–2018, 2020, 2021); MVC regular season (2024); Atlantic 10 regular season (2026)

Awards
- Hugh Durham Award (2024); Clarence Gaines Award (2016); 7× SAC Coach of the Year (2011, 2014–2018, 2020); MVC Coach of the Year (2024)

Josh Schertz (born July 5, 1975) is an American basketball coach who is the currently the head coach at Saint Louis University.

== Coaching career ==
Schertz's coaching career began as a student assistant with Florida Atlantic for the 1999–2000 season. He then moved on to Lynn, where he was an assistant for two seasons before a two-year assistant coaching stop at Queens University in North Carolina. In 2003, Schertz would follow Queens' head coach, Bart Lundy, to High Point, where he stayed until 2008 when he accepted the head coaching position at Lincoln Memorial.

In his 13 years coaching, the Railsplitters posted 11-straight 20-win seasons, including four 30-win seasons, en route to 10 NCAA Division II men's basketball tournament appearances. Schertz was also named South Atlantic Conference Coach of the Year a record seven times, while also having the highest overall winning percentage among all active NCAA head coaches at any level in a 10-year period.

On March 17, 2021, Schertz was named the 26th head coach in Indiana State history, replacing Greg Lansing.

On April 6, 2024, it was announced that Schertz had been hired as the head coach for the St. Louis Billikens, replacing Travis Ford.

== Head coaching record ==
Record table
Season	Team	Overall	Conference	Standing	Postseason
Lincoln Memorial Railsplitters (South Atlantic Conference) (2008–2021)
2008–09	Lincoln Memorial	14–14	8–8	5th	
2009–10	Lincoln Memorial	20–9	9–7	4th	
2010–11	Lincoln Memorial	27–3	16–2	1st	NCAA Division II First Round
2011–12	Lincoln Memorial	26–6	14–4	2nd	NCAA Division II Second Round
2012–13	Lincoln Memorial	25–6	15–3	1st	NCAA Division II Second Round
2013–14	Lincoln Memorial	28–3	20–2	1st	NCAA Division II Second Round
2014–15	Lincoln Memorial	30–3	21–1	1st	NCAA Division II Second Round
2015–16	Lincoln Memorial	34–3	22–0	1st	NCAA Division II Runner-Up
2016–17	Lincoln Memorial	30–6	19–3	1st	NCAA Division II Final Four
2017–18	Lincoln Memorial	32–2	20–0	1st	NCAA Division II Sweet 16
2018–19	Lincoln Memorial	20–9	14–6	3rd	
2019–20	Lincoln Memorial	32–1	22–0	1st	NCAA Division II Canceled
2020–21	Lincoln Memorial	19–4	14–3	1st	NCAA Division II Final Four
Lincoln Memorial:		337–69 (.830)	214–39 (.846)		
Indiana State Sycamores (Missouri Valley Conference) (2021–2024)
2021–22	Indiana State	11–20	4–14	9th	
2022–23	Indiana State	23–13	13–7	5th	CBI Quarterfinals
2023–24	Indiana State	32–7	17–3	1st	NIT Runner-up
Indiana State:		66–40 (.623)	34–24 (.586)		
Saint Louis Billikens (Atlantic 10 Conference) (2024–present)
2024–25	Saint Louis	19–15	11–7	T–5th	NIT First Round
2025–26	Saint Louis	29–6	15–3	T–1st	NCAA Division I Round of 32
2026–27	Saint Louis	2–0	0–0		
Saint Louis:		50–21 (.704)	26–10 (.722)		
Total:		453–130 (.777)			
National champion Postseason invitational champion Conference regular season champion Conference regular season and conference tournament champion Division regular season champion Division regular season and conference tournament champion Conference tournament champion
