= Ballston =

Ballston may refer to:

- Ballston, New York, a town in Saratoga County, New York, US
- Ballston, Oregon, an unincorporated community in Polk County, Oregon, US
- Ballston, Virginia, a neighborhood in Arlington County, Virginia, US
- Ballston Spa, New York, a village in Saratoga County, New York
- Ballston Creek, New York
- Ballston Lake, New York
