= Ruhle Road Stone Arch Bridge =

- Formerly listed on the U.S. National Register of Historic Places
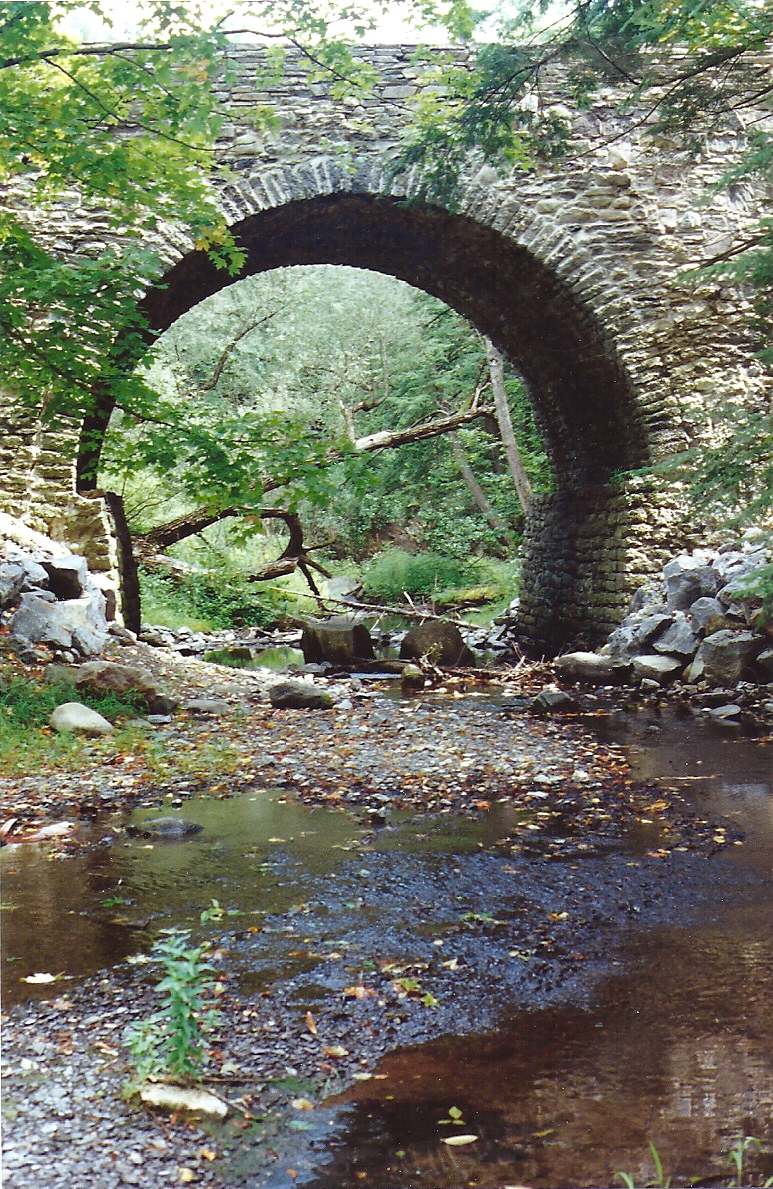

- Location within New York Location within the United States
- Location: Ruhle Road, Malta, New York
- Coordinates: 42°57′30.38″N 73°49′0.19″W
- Area: less than one acre
- Built: 1873
- Architect: Miller, Elbin
- Architectural style: Spandrel arch
- NRHP reference No.: 88001699

Significant dates
- Added to NRHP: 1988
- Removed from NRHP: September 4, 2004

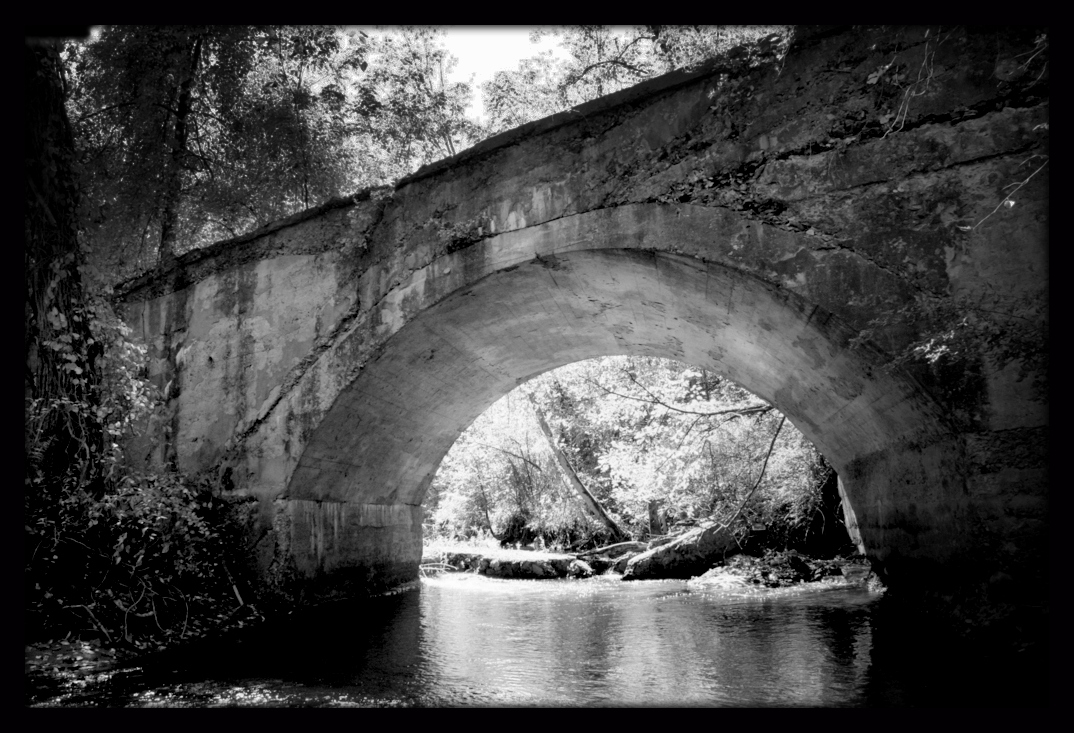
Ruhle Road Stone Arch Bridge

Ruhle Road Stone Arch Bridge was a historic stone arch bridge located at Malta in Saratoga County, New York. It was constructed about 1873 and spanned the Ballston Creek. The arch measured 26 feet from the creek surface and 23.5 feet between the abutments.

It collapsed in 1993 and was replaced in 2001 with the Ruhle Road Lenticular Metal Truss Bridge.

It was listed on the National Register of Historic Places in 1988 and delisted in 2004.
