= Union Cemetery =

Union Cemetery may refer to:

== Canada ==
- Union Cemetery (Calgary), Alberta

== United States ==
=== California ===
- Placerville Union Cemetery
- Union Cemetery (Redwood City, California), listed on the National Register of Historic Places (NRHP)

=== Connecticut ===
- Union Cemetery (Easton, Connecticut)
- Fair Haven Union Cemetery

=== Delaware ===
- Newark Union Church and Cemetery, Brandywine Hundred

=== Iowa ===
- Union Cemetery Gardener's Cottage, Iowa Falls, listed on the NRHP

=== Maryland ===
- Rockville Cemetery (Maryland), Rockville, sometimes referred to as "Rockville Union Cemetery"

=== Massachusetts ===
- Union Cemetery, Holbrook, burial place of George Mason Lovering

=== Missouri ===
- Union Cemetery (Kansas City, Missouri)

=== New York ===
- East Line Union Cemetery, Malta
- Moravia Union Cemetery, Moravia, listed on the NRHP
- Greenwood Union Cemetery, Rye and Harrison
- Union Field Cemetery, Ridgewood, Queens, New York City

=== North Carolina ===
- Union Cemetery (Greensboro, North Carolina), listed on the NRHP

=== Ohio ===
- Union Cemetery-Beatty Park, Steubenville, listed on the NRHP

=== Pennsylvania ===
- Union Cemetery (Bellefonte, Pennsylvania)

=== Washington ===
- Union Cemetery-Pioneer Calvary Cemetery, Tumwater, listed on the NRHP in Thurston County
