= 2025–26 George Washington Revolutionaries men's basketball team =

American college basketball season

2025–1926 George Washington Revolutionaries men's basketball

NIT, Second Round
- Conference: Atlantic 10 Conference
- Record: 19–16 (8–10 A-10)
- Head coach: Chris Caputo (4th season)
- Assistant coaches: Dwayne Lee; Lamont Franklin; Matt Colpoys; Aaron Thompson
- Home arena: Charles E. Smith Center

2025–26 Atlantic 10 men's basketball standings
| | Conf. | | | | Overall |
| Team | W | | L | PCT | W | | L | PCT |
|---|---|---|---|---|---|---|---|---|
| Saint Louis | 15 | – | 3 | .833 | 29 | – | 6 | .829 |
| VCU † | 15 | – | 3 | .833 | 28 | – | 8 | .778 |
| Saint Joseph's | 13 | – | 5 | .722 | 24 | – | 12 | .667 |
| Dayton | 12 | – | 6 | .667 | 25 | – | 12 | .676 |
| George Mason | 11 | – | 7 | .611 | 23 | – | 10 | .697 |
| Davidson | 10 | – | 8 | .556 | 20 | – | 14 | .588 |
| Duquesne | 9 | – | 9 | .500 | 18 | – | 15 | .545 |
| Fordham | 8 | – | 10 | .444 | 17 | – | 15 | .531 |
| George Washington | 8 | – | 10 | .444 | 19 | – | 16 | .543 |
| Rhode Island | 7 | – | 11 | .389 | 16 | – | 16 | .500 |
| Richmond | 5 | – | 13 | .278 | 15 | – | 17 | .469 |
| La Salle | 5 | – | 13 | .278 | 9 | – | 23 | .281 |
| St. Bonaventure | 4 | – | 14 | .222 | 17 | – | 17 | .500 |
| Loyola Chicago | 4 | – | 14 | .222 | 9 | – | 24 | .273 |
† 2026 A-10 tournament winner

The 2025–26 George Washington Revolutionaries men's basketball team represented George Washington University during the 2025–26 NCAA Division I men's basketball season. The team, led by fourth-year head coach Chris Caputo, played their home games at Charles E. Smith Center in Washington, D.C. as a member of the Atlantic 10 Conference.

== Previous season ==
The Revolutionaries finished the 2024–25 season 21–13, with a 9–9 record in A-10 play to finish in seventh place. They defeated Fordham in the second round of the A-10 tournament before losing to George Mason in the quarterfinals. The team accepted a bid to participate in the inaugural College Basketball Crown post-season tournament, where they were defeated by Boise State in the opening round.

== Offseason ==
=== Departures ===
Departures
| Name | No. | Pos. | Height | Weight | Year | Hometown | Reason for Departure |
|---|---|---|---|---|---|---|---|
| Darren Buchanan Jr. | 3 | G | 6'7" | 235 | Sophomore | Washington, D.C. | Transferred to Rutgers |
| Jacoi Hutchinson | 4 | G | 6'3" | 188 | Junior | Laurel, MD | Transferred to Longwood |
| Gerald Drumgoole Jr. | 5 | G | 6'5" | 210 | GS Senior | Rochester, NY | Completed eligibility |
| Dayan Nessah | 7 | F | 6'7" | 210 | Freshman | Geneva, Switzerland | Transferred to Cleveland State |
| Zamoku Weluche-Ume | 8 | F | 6'8" | 220 | Sophomore | London, England | Transferred to North Carolina A&T |
| Laziz Talipov | 10 | G | 6'1" | 165 | Senior | Orlando, FL | Graduated |
| Keegan Harvey | 14 | F | 6'11" | 230 | RS Senior | Newcastle, New South Wales | Transferred to Bryant |
| Sean Hansen | 20 | F | 6'9" | 245 | GS Senior | Ramsey, NJ | Completed eligibility |

=== Incoming transfers ===
Incoming Transfers
| Name | No. | Pos. | Height | Weight | Year | Hometown | Previous School |
|---|---|---|---|---|---|---|---|
| Tre Dinkins | 3 | G | 6'2" | 190 | GS Senior | Chester, PA | Duquesne |
| Bubu Benjamin | 11 | G | 6'7" | 220 | Junior | Medicine Hat, Alberta, Canada | Tarleton State |
| Tyrone Marshall Jr. | 24 | F | 6'8" | 215 | GS Senior | Nashville, TN | Western Kentucky |
| Luke Hunger | 33 | F | 6'10" | 250 | GS Senior | Montreal, Quebec, Canada | Northwestern |

=== Recruiting classes ===
==== 2025 recruiting class ====
College recruiting
| Name | Hometown | School | Height | Weight | Commit date |
|---|---|---|---|---|---|
| Jalen Rougier-Roane; G | Bowie, MD | Sidwell Friends (DC) | 6 ft 4 in (1.93 m) | 210 lb (95 kg) | Jan 11, 2024 |
| Jalen Rougier-Roane; G | Recruit ratings: Rivals: 247Sports: | | | | |
| Vincent Chaudhri; F | Wallkill, NY | Northfield Mount Hermon (MA) | 6 ft 7 in (2.01 m) | 190 lb (86 kg) | Nov 14, 2024 |
| Vincent Chaudhri; F | Recruit ratings: Rivals: ESPN: (78) | | | | |
Overall recruit ranking:
Note: In many cases, Scout, Rivals, 247Sports, On3, and ESPN may conflict in their listings of height and weight.; In these cases, the average was taken. ESPN grades are on a 100-point scale.; Sources: "George Washington Colonials 2025 Player Commits". ESPN.; "2025 Team Ranking". Rivals.

== Roster ==
2025–26 George Washington Revolutionaries men's basketball team
Players
Coaches

| Pos. | # | Name | Height | Weight | Year | Previous school | Hometown |
|---|---|---|---|---|---|---|---|
| G | 0 | Trey Autry | 6 ft 4 in (1.93 m) | 210 lb (95 kg) | Jr | Western Reserve Academy | Jamesville, NY |
| G | 1 | Trey Moss | 6 ft 3 in (1.91 m) | 190 lb (86 kg) | RS Sr | William & Mary | Orlando, FL |
| G | 2 | Christian Jones | 6 ft 4 in (1.93 m) | 200 lb (91 kg) | RS So | Our Saviour Lutheran School | Stratford, CT |
| G | 3 | Tre Dinkins | 6 ft 2 in (1.88 m) | 190 lb (86 kg) | GS | Duquesne | Chester, PA |
| F | 4 | Vincent Chaudhri | 6 ft 7 in (2.01 m) | 190 lb (86 kg) | Fr | Northfield Mount Hermon School | Wallkill, NY |
| G | 5 | Ty Bevins | 6 ft 6 in (1.98 m) | 200 lb (91 kg) | So | Gwynn Park High School | Clinton, MD |
| G | 7 | Jean Aranguren | 6 ft 3 in (1.91 m) | 190 lb (86 kg) | Jr | Hofstra | Valencia, Venezuela |
| G/F | 9 | Garrett Johnson | 6 ft 8 in (2.03 m) | 220 lb (100 kg) | RS Jr | Princeton | Oakton, VA |
| G | 10 | Jalen Rougier-Roane | 6 ft 4 in (1.93 m) | 210 lb (95 kg) | Fr | Sidwell Friends School | Bowie, MD |
| G | 11 | Bubu Benjamin | 6 ft 7 in (2.01 m) | 220 lb (100 kg) | Jr | Tarleton State | Medicine Hat, Alberta, Canada |
| G | 21 | Mohamed Binzagr (W) | 6 ft 2 in (1.88 m) | 190 lb (86 kg) | Sr | Cushing Academy | Jeddah, Saudi Arabia |
| F | 24 | Tyrone Marshall Jr. | 6 ft 8 in (2.03 m) | 215 lb (98 kg) | GS | Western Kentucky | Nashville, TN |
| F | 30 | Rafael Castro | 6 ft 11 in (2.11 m) | 220 lb (100 kg) | RS Sr | Providence | Dover, NJ |
| G | 32 | Amir Arrington (W) | 5 ft 10 in (1.78 m) | 170 lb (77 kg) | So | The Galloway School | Atlanta, GA |
| F | 33 | Luke Hunger | 6 ft 10 in (2.08 m) | 250 lb (113 kg) | GS | Northwestern | Montreal, Quebec, Canada |

Head coach

- Chris Caputo (Westfield State)

Assistant coach(es)

- Dwayne Lee (Saint Joseph's)
- Lamont Franklin (UNC Wilmington)
- Matt Colpoys (Penn State Behrend)
- Aaron Thompson (Butler)

Legend

- (C) Team captain
- (S) Suspended
- (I) Ineligible
- (W) Walk-on
- Injured
- Current redshirt

Roster
Last update: November 10, 2025

== Schedule and results ==
| Date time, TV | Rank^{#} | Opponent^{#} | Result | Record | High points | High rebounds | High assists | Site (attendance) city, state |
Exhibition
| October 18, 2025*; 6:00 p.m., MSN | | Georgetown | L 64–73 | | 13 – Jones | 7 – Castro | 4 – Tied | Charles E. Smith Center (4,287); Washington, D.C. |
Non-conference regular season
| November 3, 2025*; 8:00 p.m., ESPN+ | | Maine | W 67–47 | 1–0 | 15 – Hunger | 12 – Marshall Jr. | 3 – Hunger | Charles E. Smith Center (2,043); Washington, D.C. |
| November 8, 2025*; 1:30 p.m., Peacock | | vs. South Florida; Basketball Hall of Fame Tip-Off | W 99–95 | 2–0 | 22 – Dinkins | 7 – Autry | 4 – Aranguren | Mohegan Sun Arena; Uncasville, CT |
| November 12, 2025*; 7:00 p.m., ESPN+ | | American | W 107–67 | 3–0 | 23 – Dinkins | 8 – Castro | 5 – Castro | Charles E. Smith Center (1,984); Washington, D.C. |
| November 15, 2025*; 6:00 p.m., ESPN+ | | Old Dominion | W 96–73 | 4–0 | 20 – Castro | 9 – Castro | 4 – Jones | Charles E. Smith Center (2,179); Washington, D.C. |
| November 19, 2025*; 7:00 p.m., ESPN+ | | UMBC | W 89–52 | 5–0 | 16 – Johnson | 15 – Castro | 6 – Aranguren | Charles E. Smith Center (1,703); Washington, D.C. |
| November 23, 2025*; 5:00 p.m., FloCollege | | vs. McNeese; Cayman Islands Classic | L 86–92 | 5–1 | 26 – Johnson | 8 – Hunger | 4 – Jones | John Gray Gymnasium (500); George Town, Cayman Islands |
| November 24, 2025*; 5:00 p.m., FloCollege | | vs. Middle Tennessee State; Cayman Islands Classic | W 92–79 | 6–1 | 21 – Castro | 6 – Hunger | 5 – Jones | John Gray Gymnasium; George Town, Cayman Islands |
| November 25, 2025*; 7:30 p.m., FloCollege | | vs. Murray State; Cayman Islands Classic | L 95–96 | 6–2 | 26 – Castro | 11 – Castro | 4 – Castro | John Gray Gymnasium; George Town, Cayman Islands |
| December 2, 2025*; 11:00 a.m., ESPN+ | | at Army | W 84–70 | 7–2 | 16 – Castro | 9 – Johnson | 4 – Dinkins | Christl Arena (377); West Point, NY |
| December 6, 2025*; 6:00 p.m., ESPN+ | | William & Mary | W 99–86 | 8–2 | 20 – Aranguren | 9 – Marshall Jr. | 5 – Tied | Charles E. Smith Center (2,258); Washington, D.C. |
| December 10, 2025*; 7:00 p.m., ESPN+ | | Delaware | L 58–70 | 8–3 | 17 – Autry | 7 – Tied | 6 – Aranguren | Charles E. Smith Center (1,849); Washington, D.C. |
| December 13, 2025*; 2:30 p.m., ESPN2 | | vs. No. 18 Florida; Orange Bowl Basketball Classic | L 70–80 | 8–4 | 15 – Autry | 7 – Marshall Jr. | 3 – Tied | Amerant Bank Arena (11,767); Sunrise, FL |
| December 22, 2025*; 12:00 p.m., ESPN+ | | St. Mary's (MD) | W 97–40 | 9–4 | 14 – Tied | 15 – Hunger | 10 – Aranguren | Charles E. Smith Center (1,868); Washington, D.C. |
Atlantic 10 regular season
| December 31, 2025; 4:00 p.m., ESPN+ | | at Richmond | W 99–85 | 10–4 (1–0) | 27 – Castro | 8 – Dinkins | 8 – Dinkins | Robins Center (4,806); Richmond, VA |
| January 3, 2026; 2:00 p.m., USA | | La Salle | W 77–55 | 11–4 (2–0) | 26 – Castro | 14 – Castro | 4 – Jones | Charles E. Smith Center (2,124); Washington, D.C. |
| January 6, 2026; 8:00 p.m., CBSSN | | at Dayton | L 72–79 | 11–5 (2–1) | 24 – Dinkins | 7 – Castro | 3 – Castro | University of Dayton Arena (13,407); Dayton, OH |
| January 10, 2026; 3:00 p.m., CBSSN | | Loyola Chicago | W 101–66 | 12–5 (3–1) | 18 – Johnson | 14 – Castro | 9 – Jones | Charles E. Smith Center (2,169); Washington, D.C. |
| January 14, 2026; 7:00 p.m., ESPN+ | | Davidson | L 79–84 | 12–6 (3–2) | 23 – Castro | 16 – Castro | 3 – Tied | Charles E. Smith Center (1,961); Washington, D.C. |
| January 19, 2026; 5:00 p.m., CBSSN | | at George Mason; Revolutionary Rivalry | L 64–69 | 12–7 (3–3) | 18 – Johnson | 12 – Castro | 6 – Jones | EagleBank Arena (6,434); Fairfax, VA |
| January 24, 2026; 3:00 p.m., USA | | Richmond | W 85–69 | 13–7 (4–3) | 16 – Dinkins | 7 – Autry | 5 – Aranguren | Charles E. Smith Center (2,508); Washington, D.C. |
| January 27, 2026; 8:00 p.m., ESPN+ | | at No. 21 Saint Louis | L 76–79 | 13–8 (4–4) | 15 – Tied | 18 – Castro | 3 – Jones | Chaifetz Arena (7,481); St. Louis, MO |
| January 31, 2026; 2:00 p.m., ESPN+ | | Fordham | L 65–79 | 13–9 (4–5) | 13 – Jones | 6 – Benjamin | 6 – Jones | Charles E. Smith Center (2,526); Washington, D.C. |
| February 4, 2026; 7:00 p.m., ESPN+ | | at Saint Joseph's | L 73–76 | 13–10 (4–6) | 15 – Autry | 9 – Tied | 4 – Tied | Michael J. Hagan Arena (2,074); Philadelphia, PA |
| February 7, 2026; 2:00 p.m., USA | | at Duquesne | L 86–88 | 13–11 (4–7) | 18 – Aranguren | 13 – Hunger | 10 – Aranguren | UPMC Cooper Fieldhouse (2,393); Pittsburgh, PA |
| February 10, 2026; 7:00 p.m., ESPN+ | | Rhode Island | W 75–70 | 14–11 (5–7) | 21 – Hunger | 8 – Autry | 6 – Aranguren | Charles E. Smith Center (1,824); Washington, D.C. |
| February 13, 2026; 7:00 p.m., CBSSN | | George Mason; Revolutionary Rivalry | W 72–53 | 15–11 (6–7) | 31 – Hunger | 10 – Tied | 6 – Aranguren | Charles E. Smith Center (3,694); Washington, D.C. |
| February 17, 2026; 8:00 p.m., CBSSN | | at VCU | L 75–89 | 15–12 (6–8) | 24 – Hunger | 10 – Hunger | 4 – Jones | Stuart C. Siegel Center (7,637); Richmond, VA |
| February 24, 2026; 6:30 p.m., ESPN+ | | at La Salle | W 104–77 | 16–12 (7–8) | 20 – Hunger | 9 – Autry | 6 – Jones | Tom Gola Arena (1,035); Philadelphia, PA |
| February 27, 2026; 7:00 p.m., ESPN2 | | Dayton | L 66–68 | 16–13 (7–9) | 16 – Castro | 7 – Autry | 5 – Aranguren | Charles E. Smith Center (3,703); Washington, D.C. |
| March 4, 2026; 7:00 p.m., ESPN+ | | St. Bonaventure | W 91–82 ^{OT} | 17–13 (8–9) | 20 – Aranguren | 12 – Castro | 4 – Tied | Charles E. Smith Center (1,952); Washington, D.C. |
| March 7, 2026; 2:00 p.m., USA | | at Loyola Chicago | L 62–68 | 17–14 (8–10) | 17 – Johnson | 8 – Castro | 5 – Aranguren | Joseph J. Gentile Arena (2,714); Chicago, IL |
Atlantic 10 tournament
| March 12, 2026; 11:30 a.m., USA | (9) | vs. (8) Fordham; Second round | W 66–62 | 18–14 | 20 – Jones | 9 – Castro | 4 – Dinkins | PPG Paints Arena; Pittsburgh, PA |
| March 13, 2026; 11:30 a.m., USA | (9) | vs. (1) Saint Louis; Quarterfinals | L 81–88 | 18–15 | 19 – Autry | 13 – Marshall | 6 – Aranguren | PPG Paints Arena; Pittsburgh, PA |
NIT
| March 18, 2026; 8:00 p.m., ESPN+ | | at (4 AL) Utah Valley; First round | W 79–78 | 19–15 | 22 – Castro | 11 – Castro | 6 – Jones | UCCU Center (1,582); Orem, UT |
| March 22, 2026; 8:00 p.m., ESPN+ | | at (1 AL) New Mexico; Second round | L 61–86 | 19–16 | 16 – Jones | 14 – Castro | 3 – Castro | The Pit (9,207); Albuquerque, NM |
*Non-conference game. ^{#}Rankings from AP Poll. (#) Tournament seedings in parentheses. AL=Albuquerque. All times are in Eastern Time.
