= Shenantaha Creek Park =

Park in Malta, Saratoga County, New York

Coordinates: 42°57′59″N 73°49′32″W

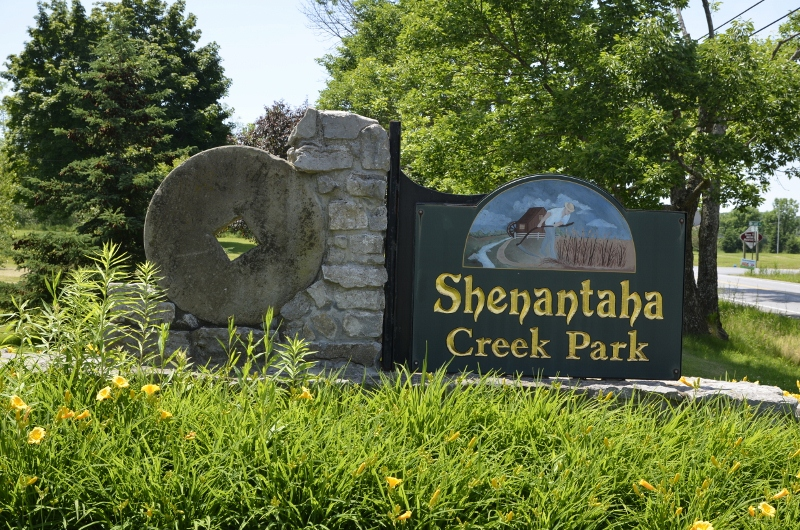
Shenantaha Creek Park sign

Shenantaha Creek Park is located in the town of Malta, in Saratoga County, New York.

In 1993, the Malta Town Board commissioned the Ruhle Road Park Committee to plan a park on 56.1 acres of land along the Ballston Creek and an abandoned railroad track. The land wasn't accessible to vehicles, so the Town purchased an additional 5.29 acres for access and egress of the park in 1995.

The park opened in 1997. A portion of the Zim Smith Trail runs through the park allowing hiking, bicycling, rollerblading, horseback riding, and snowmobiling. The forest includes oak, maple, pine, and hemlock trees. There is a moraine where it has been said that bowls in rocks were used as mortars for grinding food by Native Americans, although some speculate they result from glacial scouring.

In the park there are remains of a mill that pressed flax seed oil.
