= Ruhle Road Lenticular Metal Truss Bridge =

- U.S. National Register of Historic Places
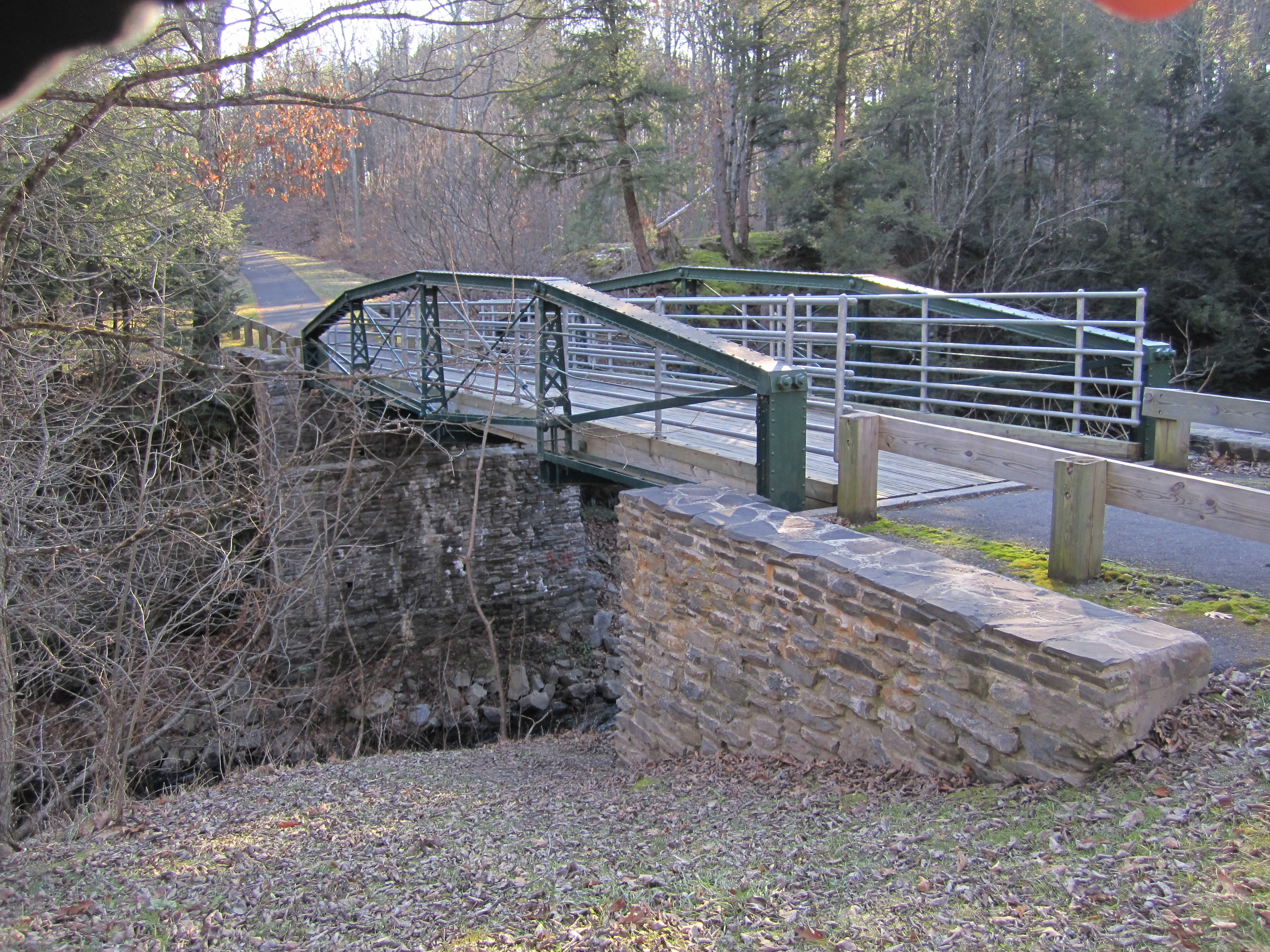
- Ruhle Road Metal Truss Bridge in 2011

- Location within New York Location within the United States
- Location: Ruhle Road over Ballston Creek, Malta, New York
- Coordinates: 42°57′30.38″N 73°49′0.19″W
- Area: Less than one acre
- NRHP reference No.: 04000954
- Added to NRHP: September 4, 2004

Ruhle Road Lenticular Metal Truss Bridge is a historic Lenticular truss bridge located in Malta, Saratoga County, New York. It was constructed in 1888 by the Berlin Iron Bridge Company of East Berlin, Connecticut, and originally spanned the Black Creek in Salem, Washington County, New York.

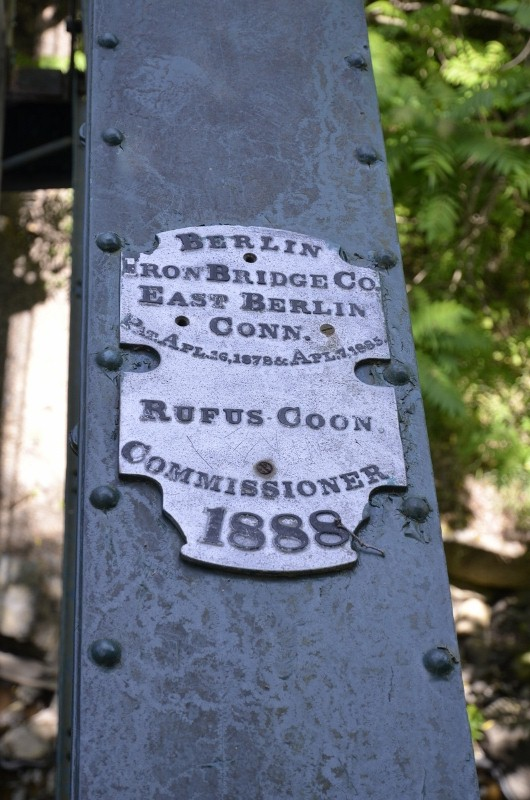
The plaque bolted to the bridge showing its origin.

It was moved to its present location in 2001 and spans the Ballston Creek, where it is used by pedestrians and non-motorized vehicles. It replaced the Ruhle Road Stone Arch Bridge that collapsed in 1993 and subsequently delisted from the National Register of Historic Places. It is a single span with an overall length of 57 feet 7 inches (17.55 m) and a width of 14 feet (4.3 m). It was listed on the National Register of Historic Places in 2004.
