= Shingle Kill =

Stream in New York, U.S.

Coordinates: 41.4089820°N 74.7396080°W

Shingle Kill is a stream in the U.S. state of New York. It is a tributary to the Delaware River.

The name "Shingle Kill" is derived from the Dutch name Syngle Kill, perhaps after a local shingle mill.
