= Kill (body of water) =

Creek, tidal inlet, river, strait, or arm of the sea

A kill is a body of water, most commonly a creek, but also a tidal inlet, river, strait, or arm of the sea. The term is derived from the Middle Dutch kille (kil in modern Dutch), meaning "riverbed" or "water channel". It is found in areas of Dutch influence in the Netherlands' former North American colony of New Netherland, primarily the Hudson and Delaware Valleys.

The single 'l' spelling of 'kil' is the norm in modern Dutch geographical names, e.g. Dordtsche Kil, Sluiskil, or Kil van Hurwenen. It can occasionally be found in North America.

== Examples ==
=== Freestanding "kill" ===
Examples of the freestanding use of "kill" are:

- Anthony Kill, in Saratoga County, New York which flows from Round Lake through the city of Mechanicville into the Hudson River.
- Arthur Kill and Kill Van Kull, both separating Staten Island, New York from New Jersey
- Batten Kill, Vermont and New York
- Bronx Kill between the Bronx and Randalls Island
- Normans Kill, an upper Hudson River tributary near Albany, New York
- Poesten Kill, a creek near Troy, New York
- Wynants Kill, another creek near Troy, New York
- West Kill, a creek in Greene County, New York
  - West Kill, New York

=== Freestanding "kills" ===
The plural form "kills" is also used; examples include:

- Dutch Kills, a tributary of Newtown Creek, New York City
  - Dutch Kills, a neighborhood of Long Island City, New York City
- English Kills, a tributary of Newtown Creek, New York City
- Fresh Kills, New York
- Great Kills, Staten Island, New York City

=== Composite names ===
"Kill" is also joined with a noun to create a composite name for a place or body of water:

- Catskill, New York
- Catskill Mountains, New York
- Catskill Creek which flows from the Catskill Mountains, New York to the Hudson River.
- Cobleskill, New York
- Cresskill, New Jersey
- Fishkill, New York
- Kaaterskill Clove, a deep gorge, or valley, in New York's eastern Catskill Mountains
- Kaaterskill Creek, a tributary of Catskill Creek
- Kaaterskill Falls
- Kaaterskill High Peak, one of the Catskill Mountains
- Peekskill, New York
- Poestenkill, New York
- Schuylkill River, Pennsylvania
- Spackenkill, New York
- Tenakill, New Jersey
- Raymondskill Falls, Pennsylvania
- Wallkill, New York
- Wynantskill, New York
