= Luther Forest Technology Campus =

Semiconductor site in New York, United States

Coordinates: 42.962233°N 73.762207°W

The Luther Forest Technology Campus or LFTC is a 1,414-acre (573 hectares) site in the towns of Malta and Stillwater, New York, specifically designed for semiconductor and nanotechnology manufacturing and other innovative technologies. The site has Interstate highway access 1.5 miles (2.4 km) away.

== History ==
The campus sits on an extensive sand plain, the delta of the prehistoric "Iromohawk" river as it entered Lake Albany at the end of the last ice age. When the early settlers cleared the forests and ploughed the soil they quickly discovered that the thin layer of topsoil blew away and the underlying sand piled up in large drifts.

In 1898 Thomas C. Luther began to purchase the otherwise useless land and undertook a pioneering effort of reforestation, planting thousands of white pine trees. The reforested area eventually grew to over 7,000 acres (2,800 ha), and became known as "Luther Forest".

In 1947 the then largely uninhabited area was home to a Hermes Rocket test site, known as the Malta Test Station, an approximately 300 acres (120 ha) site where rocket engines underwent stationary testing under the supervision of the General Electric Company. "The original facility included underground and above-ground bunkers, two gantries and a number of lab buildings. There were checkpoints with armed guards and clearance was required to gain entrance." Rocket scientists such as Wernher von Braun visited the site and often stayed for several weeks. General Electric later sold its rocket business to Wright Malta Corporation, formed by former GE employees at the site headed by Eugene Wright. Wright Malta still maintains a facility, currently producing a variety of industrial products. "Project Hermes" is commemorated by Hermes Road, one of the main access roads to the tech park. Another legacy of the project was soil contamination from rocket fuel that caused the facility to be listed as a Superfund site in 1987. In 1999 cleanup was completed and the site was removed from the list.

The Malta Test Station was purchased in 1964 by the New York State Atomic and Space Development Authority. Later another 280 acres (110 ha) was acquired by eminent domain. The Atomic and Space Development Authority later became the New York State Energy Research and Development Authority (NYSERDA) which now operates the former Test Station site as the Saratoga Technology + Energy Park (STEP).

In 1998 New York began an initiative to pre-permit chip manufacturing plants, known as Chip Fab ’98. In 2000 the Saratoga Economic Development Corporation (SEDC) chose the current site, began the process of obtaining zoning approval, and began preliminary work.

== AMD and GlobalFoundries ==
In 2006 Advanced Micro Devices (AMD) began to evaluate Luther Forest, along with other sites worldwide. Later that year they committed to constructing a chip plant ("Fab"), Fab 8, at the Campus with an estimated cost of $3.2 billion (USD). At the time this was the most advanced semiconductor manufacturing facility in the world and the largest private sector industrial investment in the history of New York State. In 2008 AMD spun off its manufacturing to a new joint venture with the Advanced Technology Investment Company (ATIC) of Abu Dhabi, called GlobalFoundries. Construction began in 2009.

Fab 8 was the first facility to produce 300 mm silicon wafers designed for 32 nm technologies. This was the second manufacturing facility operated by GlobalFoundries, with Fab 1 located in Dresden, Germany. As of 2015 it can produce wafers with technology of 28 nm and below.

== Design and site construction ==
Creighton Manning Engineering of Albany, New York was contracted by the Saratoga Economic Development Corporation to prepare the design approval documents, including the preliminary and final design of the site roads, bridges and underground infrastructure along with the construction inspection of the site work. Construction is expected to be completed by Rifenburg Construction for the site roadways and infrastructure by the end of 2009.

== Infrastructure ==
As of 2015 the following infrastructure is in place:

- Electrical – four independent 115 kV circuits attached to two separate providers,
- Natural gas – 10,000; 8" gas line with a capacity of 150,000 cfh. A 12" gas line is being installed.
- Water – 10 million gallons/day capacity. A 5 million gallon water tank provides a back-up supply.
- Sewer – 10 million gallon sewer main connects to Saratoga County waste treatment facility.
- Roads – multiple entry points; five miles of interior roadways.

== Recreation ==
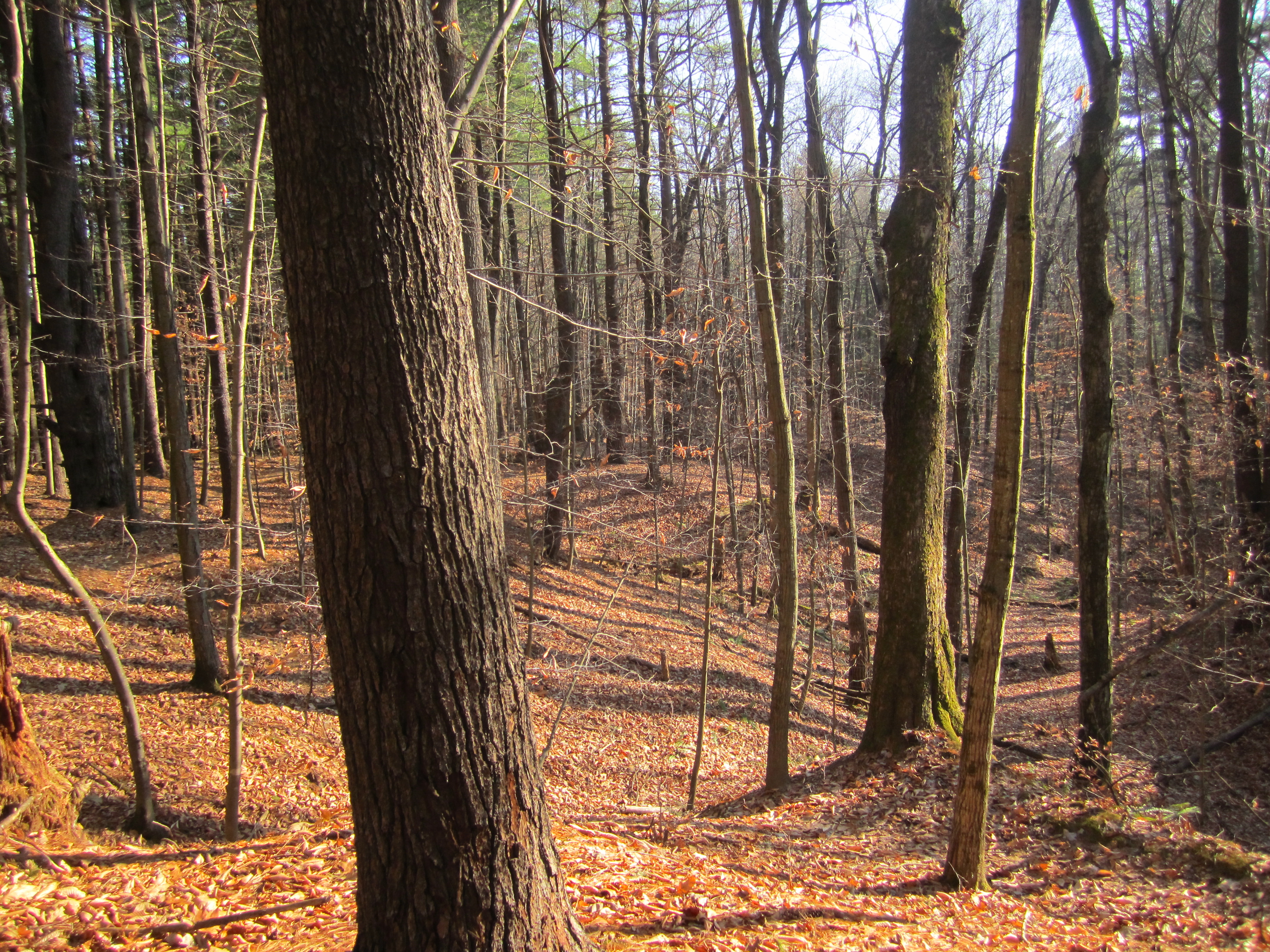
100 Acre Wood in late Autumn

The Technology Campus includes a recreation area known as the "100 Acre Wood" with nearly 2 miles (3.2 km) of wooded hiking trails. Adjoining the wooded area are 30 acres (12 ha) of land being developed as a park and recreation area including sports fields. In addition to the trails of the 100 Acre Wood the Campus contains a network of roadside trails that connect to the county-wide Zim Smith Trail.
