= Placerville Union Cemetery =

Cemetery in El Dorado County, California

Details
- Established: August 1871
- Location: 646 Bee Street, Placerville, El Dorado County, California
- Country: United States
- Coordinates: 38.73174°N 120.80841°W
- Type: Public
- Size: 4.76 acres (1.93 ha)
- No. of graves: 6300+
- Find a Grave: Placerville Union Cemetery
- The Political Graveyard: Placerville Union Cemetery

Placerville Union Cemetery, formerly Union Cemetery, is a burial ground formed in 1871 by a group of fraternal organizations, and located in Placerville, California. It had been established as a private cemetery, and in 2005 the management was switched to the El Dorado County.

== History ==
=== 19th and 20th-centuries ===
The fraternal organizations that founded the cemetery in August 1871, included the Masons, the Ancient Order of Druids, Odd Fellows, Improved Order of Red Men, Fraternal Order of Eagles, Native Sons of the Golden West, Grand Army of the Republic, and the Knights of Pythias. The interments in the graveyard include the various fraternal organization members, the Placerville city founders from the California Gold Rush, and Union Army civil war veterans. From the time of the cemetery founding up until 2005, it had operated as a privately managed; with the Masonic Lodge in management until 1950.

=== 21st-century ===
In 2000, Chapel of the Pines owned by the Loewen Group managed the cemetery, and there had been issues with improper cemetery burials, landscape maintenance issues, and vagrants living on the premise for two months. The County of El Dorado accepted management of the property in 2006, after a history of financial issues and money mismanagement faced by the burial ground. In the time of management change in 2006, there was a need to keep better records, as many of the paper grave records had gone missing, and to upgrade the water system.

In February 2020, the headstones in the cemetery were damaged, and possibly vandalized. The Placerville Union Cemetery is purportedly haunted, which has attracted paranormal enthusiasts.

== See also ==
- List of cemeteries in California
- Pioneer cemetery
- Union Cemetery (disambiguation)
