= Dunning Street Cemetery =

Historic cemetery in New York, United States

- U.S. National Register of Historic Places
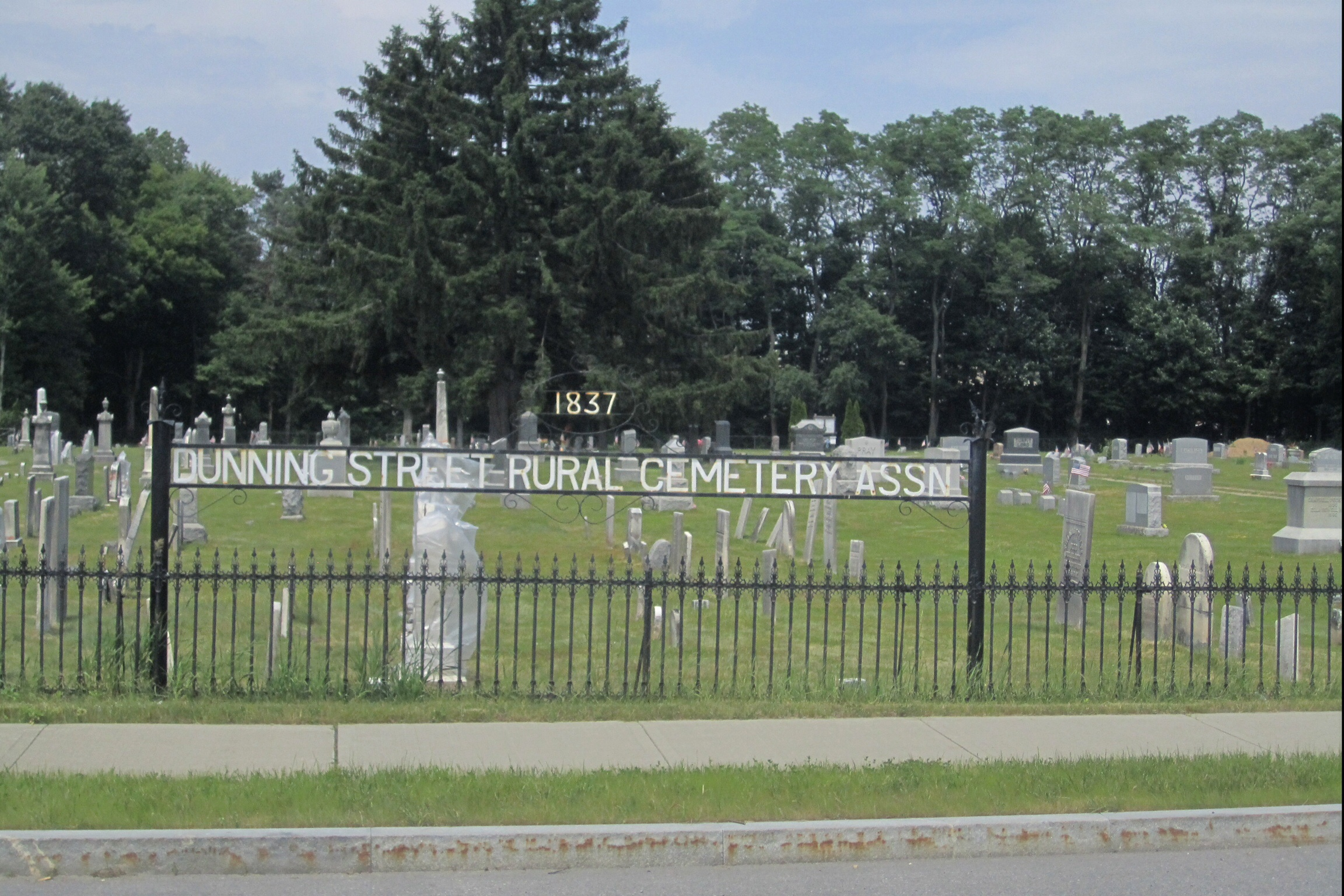
- Dunning Street Cemetery, 2013

- Location within New York Location within the United States
- Location: Dunning Street, Malta, New York
- Coordinates: 42°58′17″N 73°47′44″W
- Area: 4.53 acres (1.83 ha)
- Built: c. 1775
- Architect: Broughton, Walter
- NRHP reference No.: 15000033
- Added to NRHP: February 23, 2015

Dunning Street Cemetery is a historic rural cemetery located at Malta, Saratoga County, New York. The cemetery was established about 1775, and incorporated by the Dunning Street Cemetery Association in 1908. It is the final resting place of many important early Malta residents, including veterans of American Revolutionary War and includes a number of notable examples of 19th century local funerary art. It remains an active burial ground.

It was listed on the National Register of Historic Places in 2015.
