= Malta Test Station =

Rocket engine test site

Coordinates: 42°57′56″N 73°45′15″W

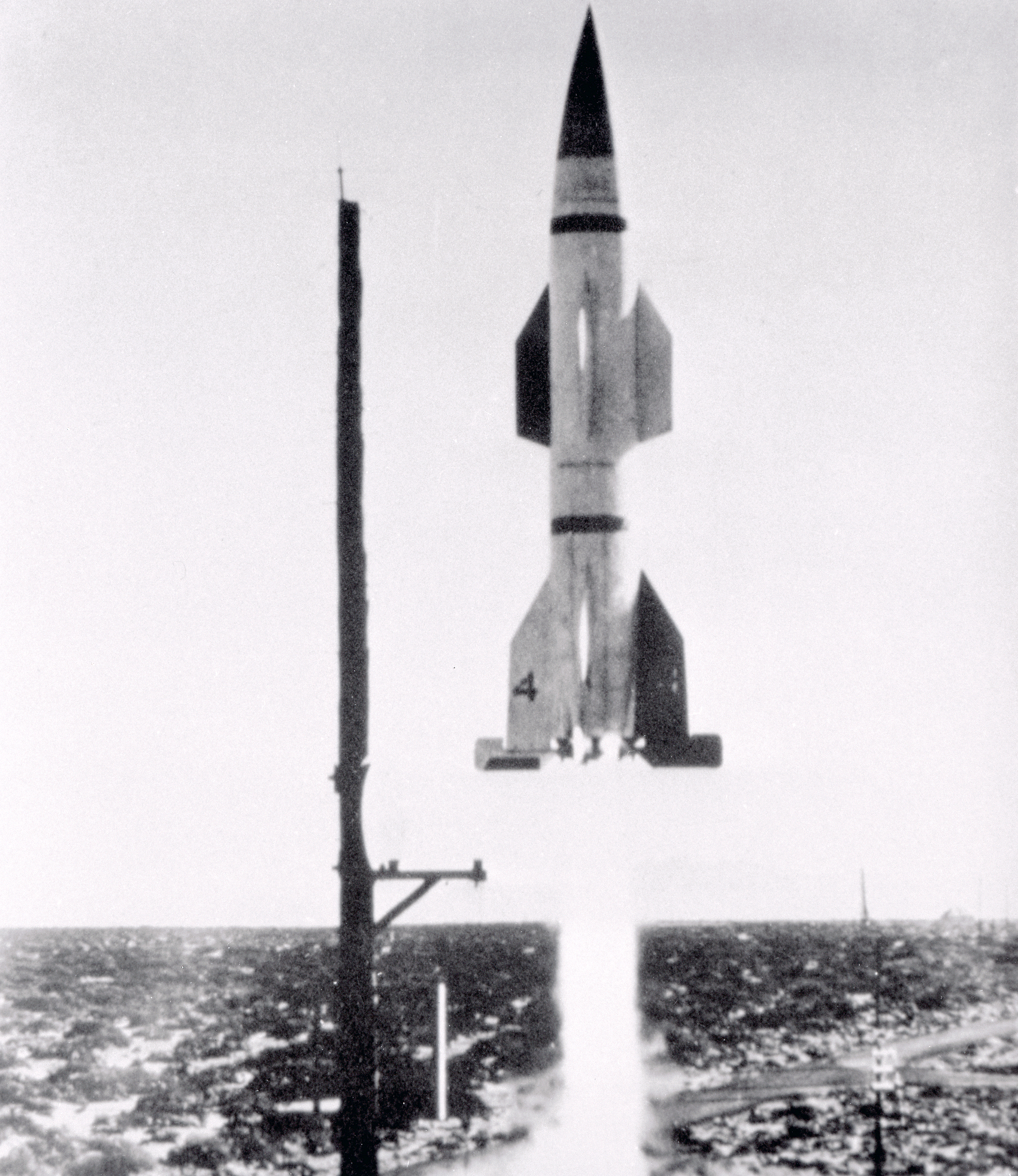
Hermes A-1 Rocket test at White Sands, New Mexico. The Hermes A-1 used engines tested in Malta

Malta Test Station, located in Malta, New York, is a former US Army fuel and explosives testing facility. It was established in 1945 and used to test rocket engines for the US Army's "Project Hermes", new fuels and explosives. It has also been used for atomic energy research.

Malta test station has been used by various government agencies including the US Department of Defense, National Aeronautics and Space Agency (NASA), the US Department of Energy, and the New York State Energy Research and Development Authority (NYSERDA), it was operated by General Electric until 1984 when the Wright-Malta Corporation took over occupation and continued to test fuels and explosives for the US military and the US Department of Energy until 2005.

The Wright Malta Corporation also worked on noise suppression systems, fuel cells, assisted technologically oriented start up businesses, waste-to-energy technology, liquid fuel propellants, and a number of other emerging technologies related to defense, energy, and product testing.

It was listed as a Superfund site in 1987 and removed from the list following cleanup in 1999.

In 1996, the US Environmental Protection Agency (EPA) documented in the Record of Decision (ROD) and selected a cleanup remedy for the contaminated area. These included air stripping of the water supply at the test station, natural attenuation of the groundwater contaminants, continued monitoring of the surface and groundwater, institutional controls to minimize the ingestion of the contaminants, as well as excavating and disposing of contaminated soil off-site. It is being monitored by the EPA to ensure that it is safe from possible chemical contamination.

The Malta Test Station was the site of a serious industrial accident in May 2004.

In 2004, Luther Forest Technology Campus Economic Development Corporation purchased 1,4000 acres. The site and surrounding area has since been transformed into the Luther Forest Technology Campus, home to a new chip fabrication plant owned by GlobalFoundries. "Project Hermes" is commemorated by Hermes Road, one of the main access roads to the Technology Campus.

== Gallery ==
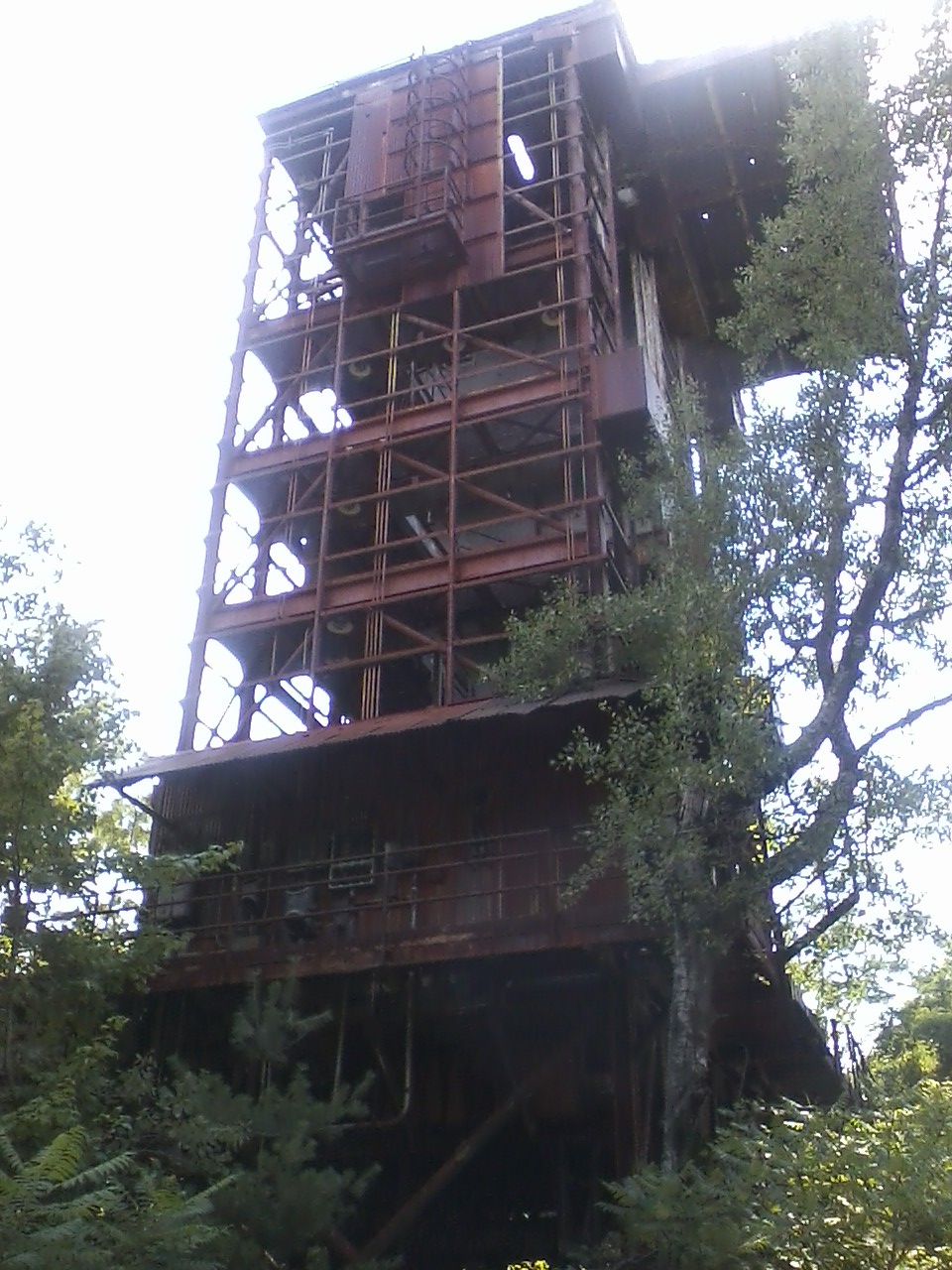
Rocket engine test gantry at old Malta Test Station in Malta, NY in 2013. This place was the actual birthplace of the United States' Space & Missile programs not to mention the countless tests done at this site by the military on just explosives alone.

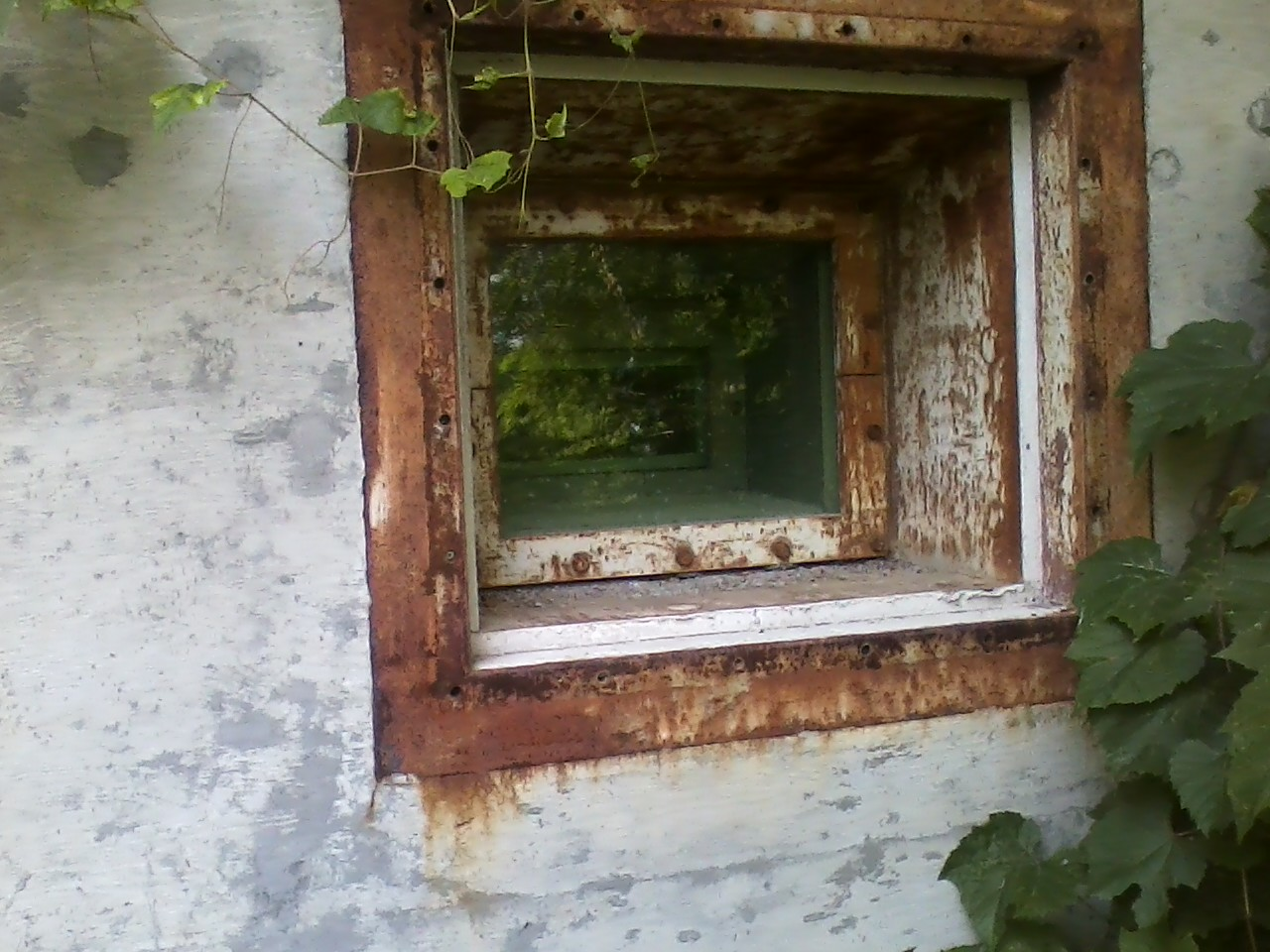
blast window in reinforced concrete bunker used to observe early rocket and explosive tests at site.

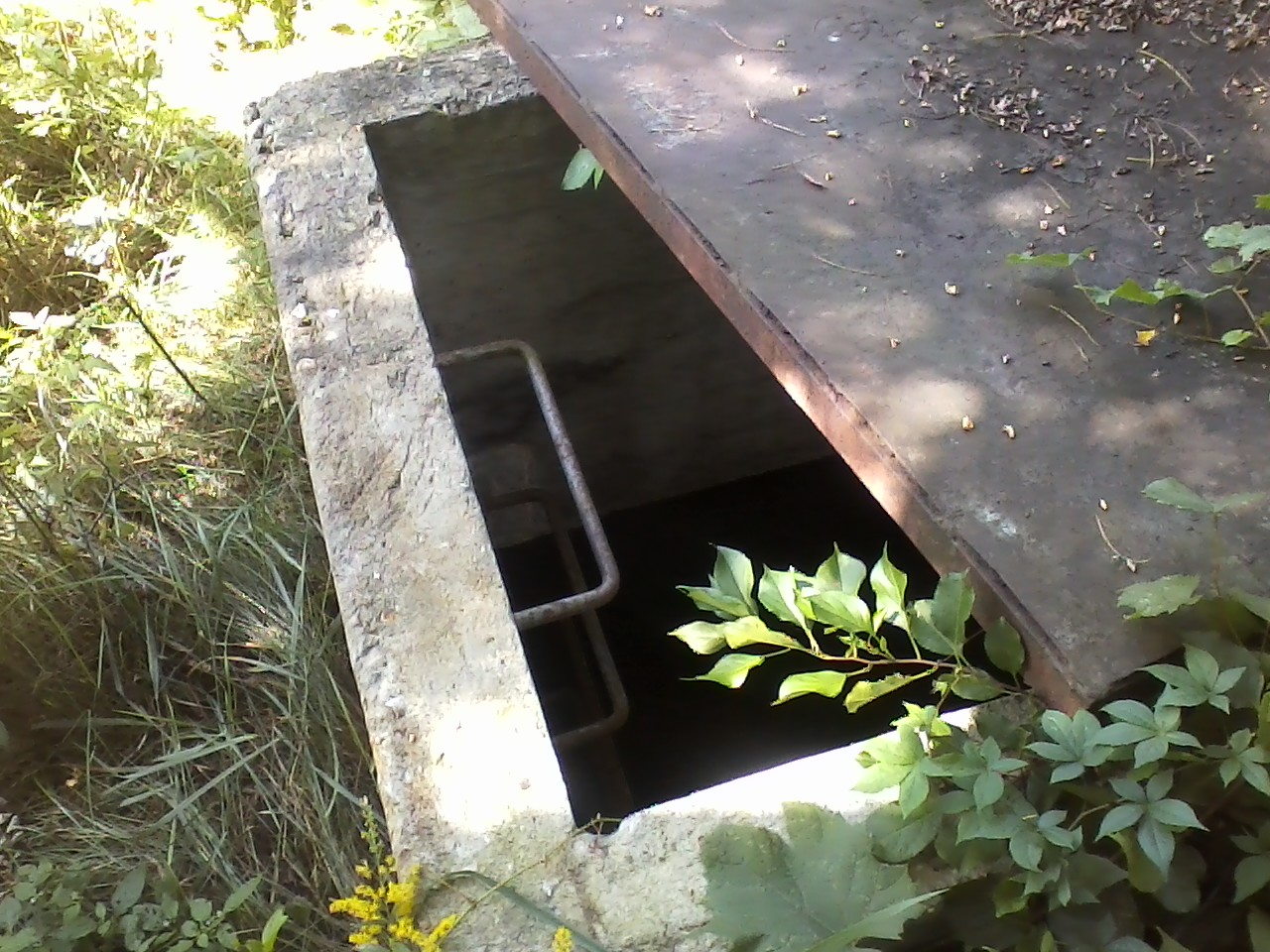
ladder going into reinforced underground bunker that housed equipment and electrical and sensor wiring conduits leading out to gantry.

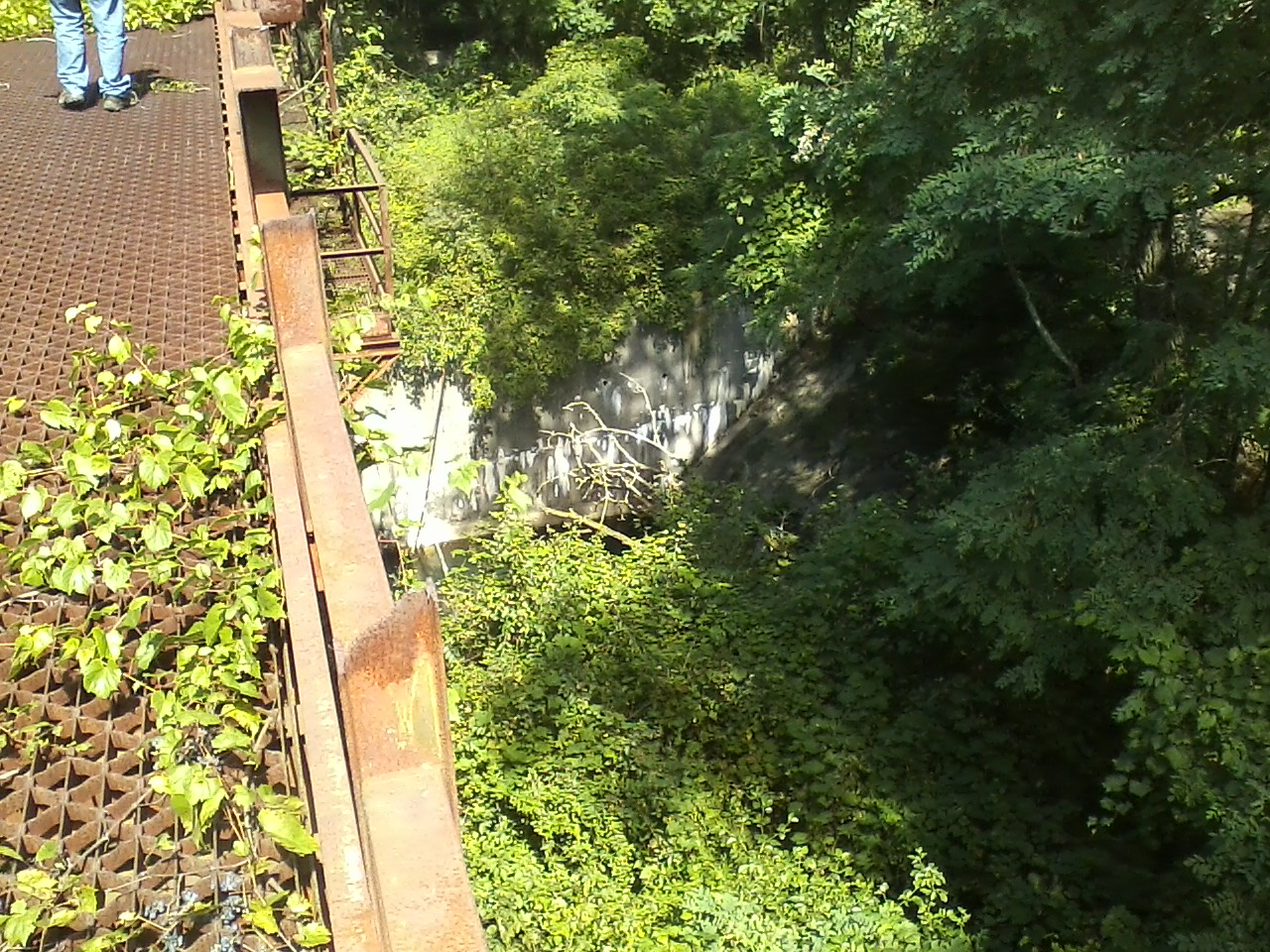
reinforced concrete exhaust/blast pit that directed rocket blasts "out and away" from test gantry. "very overgrown and has appx. 4-5 feet of stagnant standing water"

== See also ==
- List of Superfund sites in New York
