= Kil van Hurwenen =

Coordinates: 51.8092°N 5.2850°E

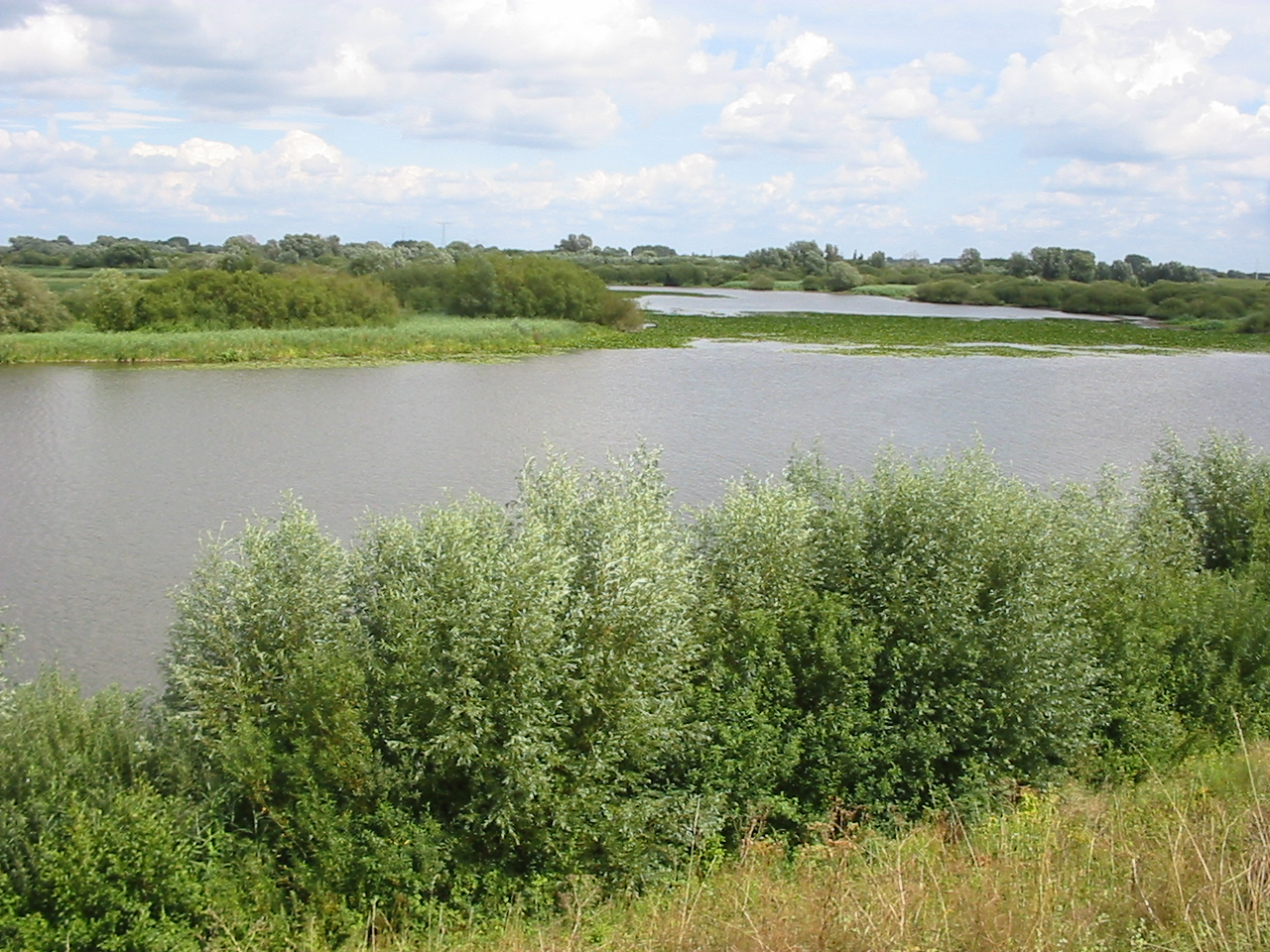
Kil van Hurwenen

The Kil Hurwenen, or De Kil as locals call it, is a nature reserve in the floodplain of the Waal at Hurwenen in the Netherlands in the municipality of Maasdriel.

The area was created in 1639 when a former meander of the Waal was cut off from the river by human intervention. The walk in the countryside is still clearly recognizable. During high tide the area is still flooded by water from the river. In the immediate vicinity there are a number of sand ditches, a remnant of the clay extraction from the brick industry in the area. Before the municipal reorganization of 1999 the preserve still partly belonged to the municipality of Zaltbommel. However, by a boundary adjustment the nature preserve belongs entirely to the municipality of Maasdriel.

Many bird species encountered during the trek to and from their wintering areas were using the area to forage.

The Kil Hurwenen is the property of The Dutch National Forest Service and is not accessible to the public. However, the surrounding fields from May 1 to October 1 are freely accessible from sunrise to sunset.

== See also ==
- Kill (body of water)
