= Wiggins-Collamer House =

Historic house in New York, United States

- U.S. National Register of Historic Places
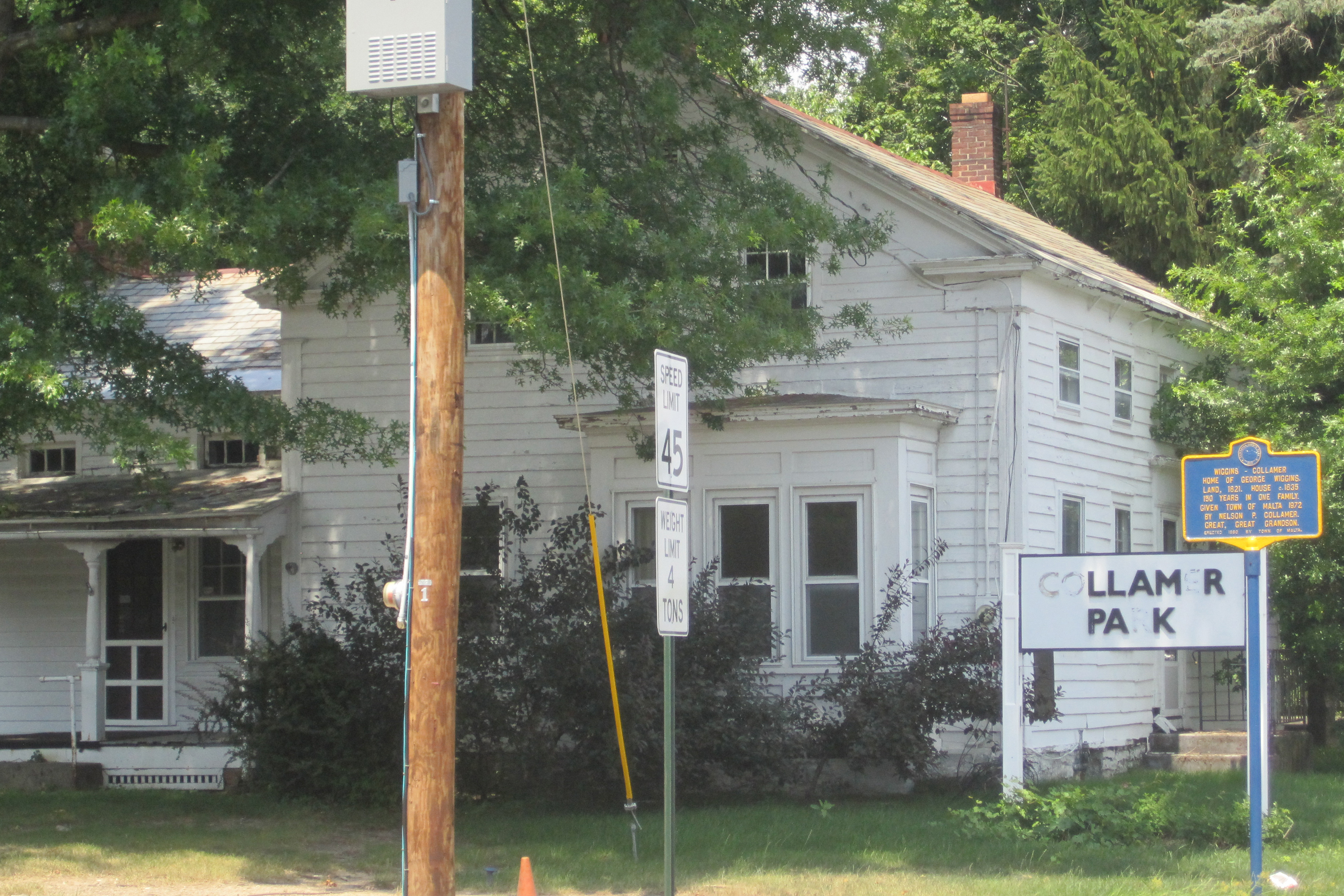
- Wiggins-Collamer House, July 2013

- Location within New York Location within the United States
- Nearest city: Malta, New York
- Coordinates: 42°59′47″N 73°47′28″W
- Area: 2 acres (0.81 ha)
- Built: 1835
- Architectural style: Federal, Greek Revival
- NRHP reference No.: 07001127
- Added to NRHP: October 31, 2007

Wiggins-Collamer House is a historic home located at Malta in Saratoga County, New York. It was built about 1835 and is 1 1/2-story, five-by-two-bay, timber framed residence. It has a rectangular main block and 1-story rear wing. It represents a transitional Federal / Greek Revival period residence.

It was added to the National Register of Historic Places in 2007.

As of 2020, it has been restored and is the home of Finishing Touches, a home and lifestyle home décor and gift shop curated by Interior Designer Shelly Walker. The location is also home to Cookies & Cream Ice Cream Shop and Shelly's Interior Design business. Together Shelly and Doug, her husband, have created a venue space for every member of the family to enjoy. In 2023 new landscaping was installed that allows families to enjoy Collamer Park as well as games and seating for patrons.
