= Ransom Cook =

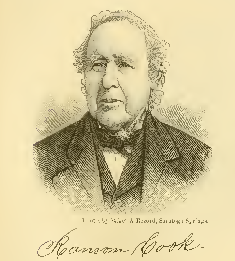
Ransom Cook

Ransom Cook (1794 – 1881) was an inventor who lived much of his life in Saratoga Springs, New York.

One of nine children of furniture maker Joseph Cook and Mary Ann Tolman, he was born in Wallingford, Connecticut in 1794. His family moved to the village of East Line (now Malta, New York) around 1802, where his father opened a furniture shop.

In 1813, Cook set up a shop of his own in Saratoga Springs. Five years later he married Rachael Ayers, whom he remained with for the rest of his life. Soon after his marriage, Cook built a new furniture shop on Congress Street and enjoyed a successful business.

In 1836 Thomas Davenport of Vermont joined with Cook, and the two developed a new electro-magnetic motor that was many years ahead of its time. In 1837 the pair received the first US patent for en electric motor.

In 1842, the New York State government solicited Cook to build a new type of prison that utilized prisoners for labor. Cook recommended that a new prison be located at Dannemora, Clinton County, New York near an iron mine (known as the Clinton Correctional Facility). Cook supervised the entire construction, and created prisoner rules which were considered highly humane and liberal, as opposed to the harsh conditions found in most other prisons.

Once his commission was complete, Cook returned home to Saratoga and resumed his business. Over the next few decades, he patented a multitude of inventions, including a wrought-iron cannon, improved railroad car ventilation, improved scissors, and a new lunchbox. However, his most famous invention was the Cook Auger, sometimes referred to as the Beetle Bit, as it was inspired by examining the jaws of an insect under a microscope. This auger was almost immediately adopted around the world soon after its patent in 1851 and remains the standard today. He is also sometimes credited with the invention of stenciling.

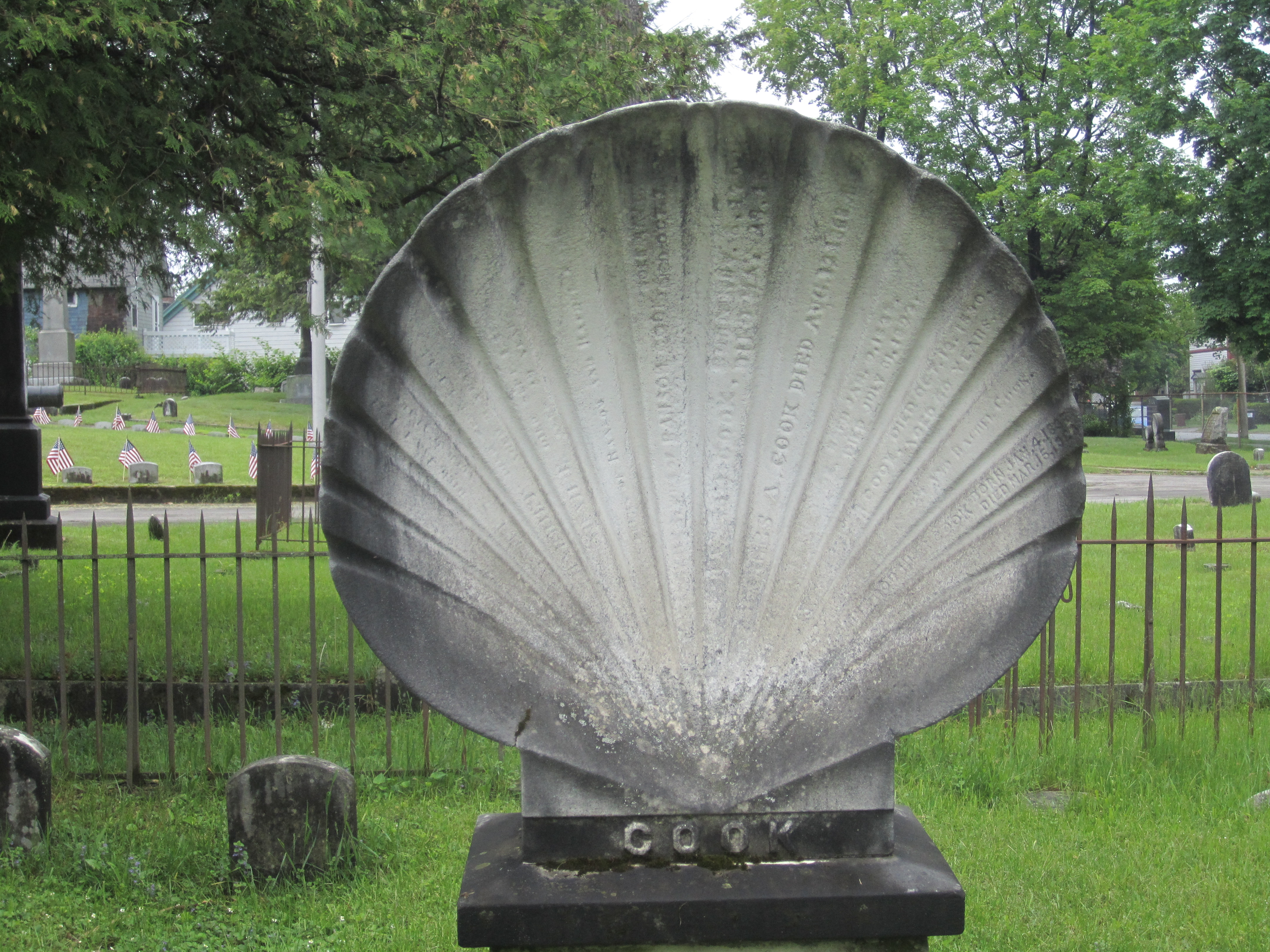
Cook family monument, Greenridge Cemetery

Ransom Cook died in May 1881 at the age of 87. He is buried in the Greenridge Cemetery under a stone pedestal of his own design. He is considered one of Saratoga Springs' most distinguished citizens.

== See also ==
- Nelson Cook
