= Anthony Kill =

Stream in Saratoga County, New York

Coordinates: 42°55′13″N 73°44′50″W

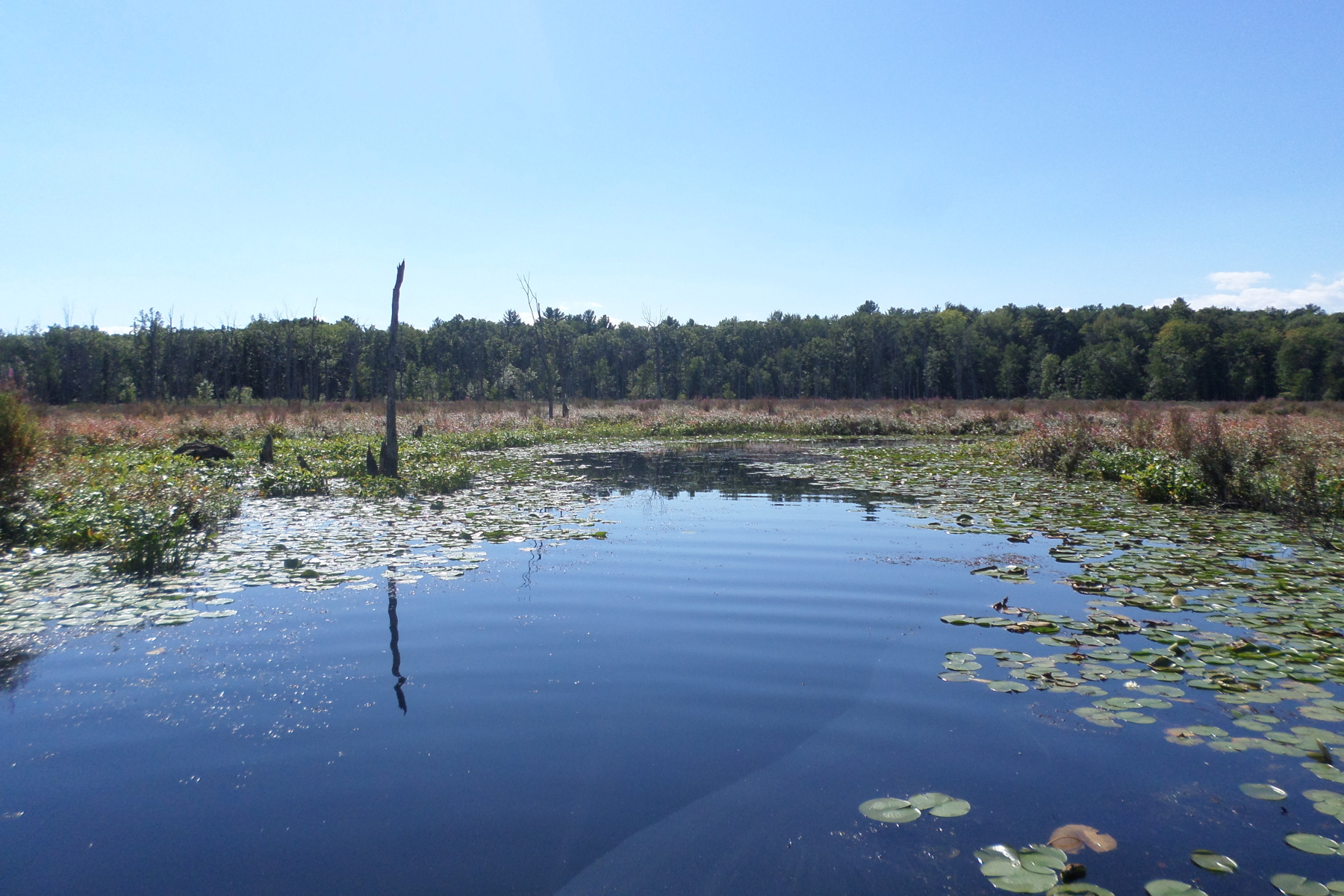
The Head of the Anthony Kill in Malta, New York

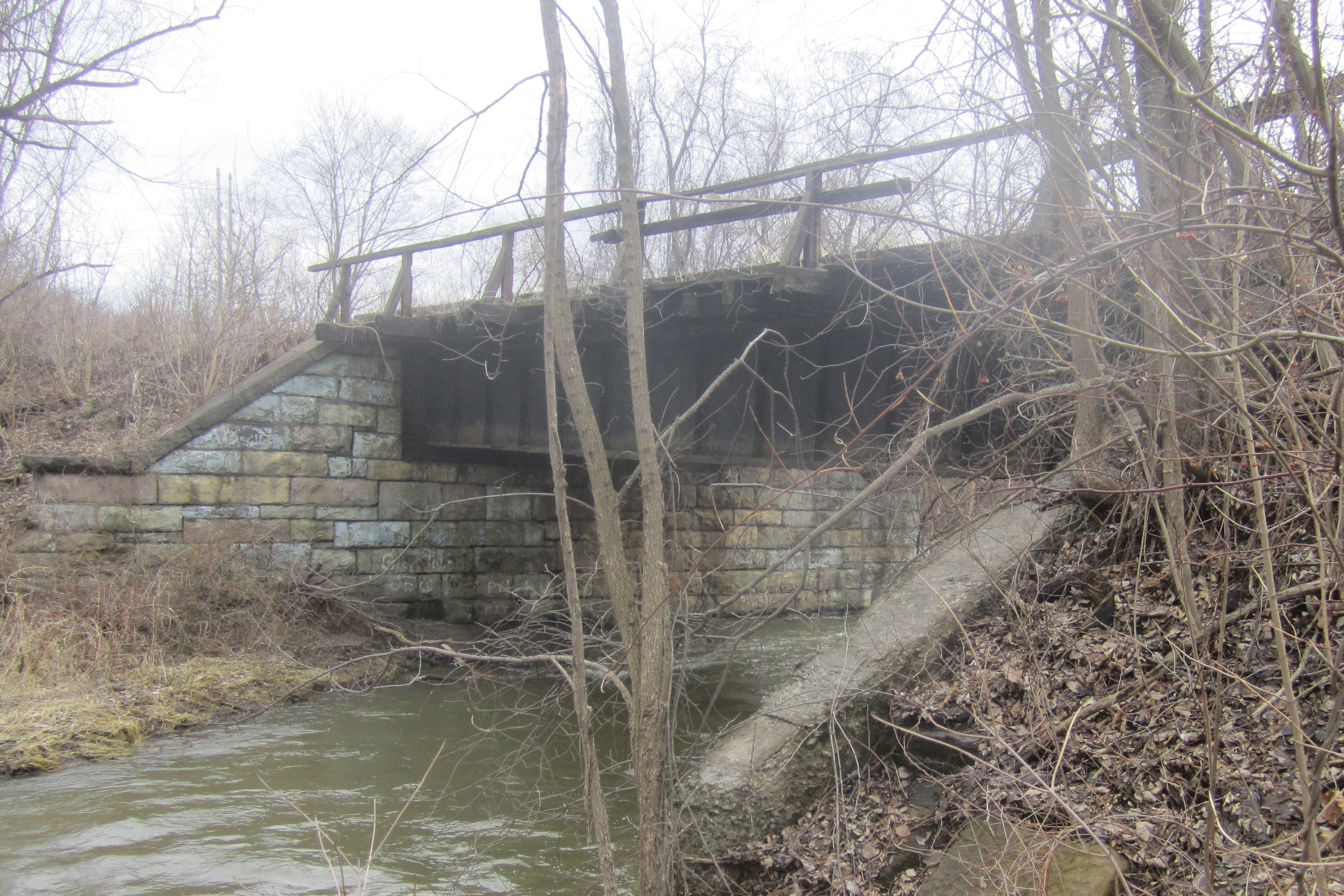
The Anthony Kill at Mechanicville, New York

The Anthony Kill, also called Tenandeho Creek, is a stream ("kill") in Saratoga County, New York approximately 8 miles (13 km) long. Its source is the east end of Round Lake, and it flows east into the Hudson River in Mechanicville. It drains an area of approximately 53 square miles (140 km^{2}).

The Native name "Ta-nen-da-ho-wa" has been translated "great point". In English the name was formerly "Anthony's Kill", or the "St. Anthony Kill," but there seems to be no record of its origin. The will of Robert Livingston, dated 1728, refers to "a creek commonly called Anthony's kill."

== Recreation ==
The Kill is popular with kayakers and canoeists. In the short spring snowmelt season it is "a class II run with several named rapids." The Tenandeho Whitewater Derby is held annually, and normally attracts 50 entrants. Outside of the spring season, "Anthony Kill is a slow moving marshy river that bends and meanders."

In 2014 The New York State Department of Environmental Conservation (DEC) opened a boat launch or the west side of Round Lake, replacing an informal launch site, which provides access to the Anthony Kill.

== Geology ==
The Anthony Kill is notable because its size is "out of proportion to the breadth and depth of the valley." "There is quite conclusive evidence that in late glacial times waters from the flooded Mohawk river coursed through this system of channels, discharging into the waters of the Hudson valley at Mechanicville. At a later time the Mohawk became established in its present course, and the Anthony kill, draining the old channel as far back as the divide at the head of Ballston Lake, is the shrunken remnant of the much larger stream through whose erosive work the present relatively large valley was formed."
