= Country Knolls, New York =

- CDP
- Location within New York Location within the United States
- Coordinates: 42°54′52″N 73°48′35″W
- Country: United States
- State: New York
- County: Saratoga

Area
  - Total: 3.42 sq mi (8.87 km^{2})
  - Land: 3.42 sq mi (8.87 km^{2})
  - Water: 0 sq mi (0.00 km^{2})
- Elevation: 282 ft (86 m)

Population (2020)
  - Total: 5,349
  - Density: 1,562.0/sq mi (603.09/km^{2})
- Time zone: UTC-5 (Eastern (EST))
  - Summer (DST): UTC-4 (EDT)
- FIPS code: 36-18542
- GNIS feature ID: 1867396

Country Knolls is a census-designated place (CDP) in Saratoga County, New York, United States. The population was 5,349 at the 2020 census.

== History ==
The Country Knolls CDP is part of the "Country Knolls Estates" housing development. The area is sometimes also referred to as "Country Knolls North" or as the "original" Country Knolls to clarify it from a similar housing development called "Country Knolls South" that was built later a few miles south of Country Knolls. The census-designated place Country Knolls is within and is smaller than the larger Country Knolls Estates. Country Knolls (North), Country Knolls South, Country Knolls West, and the earlier Clifton Knolls were built by the local Clifton Park housing development company owned by Robert Van Patten.

The Country Knolls Civic Association has a description of the development and growth of the original Country Knolls from its initial homes built on Hillcrest Drive, Meridian Lane, Ridge Lane, and Manor Court in 1964, to the expansion of Country Knolls into the town of Malta, and the later addition of homes in 1988/89 on previously untouched land in the middle of Country Knolls in 1988 on the new Huntington Parkway. The housing development Country Knolls also includes adjacent homes in the "Longkill" and "Ashley" sections that are separated from the main development by Longkill Road and Ushers Road, respectively.

== Geography ==
Country Knolls is located at 42°54′52″N 73°48′35″W (42.914376, -73.809651). According to the United States Census Bureau, the community has a total area of 1.6 square miles (4.1 km^{2}), all land.

== Demographics ==
Historical population
Census	Pop.	Note	%±
2000	2,155		—
2020	5,349		—
U.S. Decennial Census

=== 2020 census ===
As of the 2020 census, Country Knolls had a population of 5,349. The median age was 42.7 years. 23.9% of residents were under the age of 18 and 18.0% of residents were 65 years of age or older. For every 100 females there were 98.0 males, and for every 100 females age 18 and over there were 97.7 males age 18 and over.

100.0% of residents lived in urban areas, while 0.0% lived in rural areas.

There were 1,919 households in Country Knolls, of which 35.5% had children under the age of 18 living in them. Of all households, 72.4% were married-couple households, 8.4% were households with a male householder and no spouse or partner present, and 14.6% were households with a female householder and no spouse or partner present. About 14.6% of all households were made up of individuals and 8.4% had someone living alone who was 65 years of age or older.

There were 2,000 housing units, of which 4.0% were vacant. The homeowner vacancy rate was 1.3% and the rental vacancy rate was 4.0%.

Racial composition as of the 2020 census
Race	Number	Percent
White	4,748	88.8%
Black or African American	106	2.0%
American Indian and Alaska Native	6	0.1%
Asian	169	3.2%
Native Hawaiian and Other Pacific Islander	1	0.0%
Some other race	23	0.4%
Two or more races	296	5.5%
Hispanic or Latino (of any race)	178	3.3%

=== 2000 census ===
As of the census of 2000, there were 2,155 people, 725 households, and 659 families residing in the community. The population density was 1,312.6 inhabitants per square mile (506.8/km^{2}). There were 736 housing units at an average density of 448.3 per square mile (173.1/km^{2}). The racial makeup of the CDP was 96.57% White, 0.65% African American, 0.14% Native American, 1.90% Asian, and 0.74% from two or more races. Hispanic or Latino of any race were 0.56% of the population.

There were 725 households, out of which 41.1% had children under the age of 18 living with them, 84.3% were married couples living together, 3.9% had a female householder with no husband present, and 9.1% were non-families. 8.0% of all households were made up of individuals, and 3.3% had someone living alone who was 65 years of age or older. The average household size was 2.97 and the average family size was 3.12.

In the community, the population was spread out, with 28.2% under the age of 18, 4.9% from 18 to 24, 23.7% from 25 to 44, 31.0% from 45 to 64, and 12.3% who were 65 years of age or older. The median age was 41 years. For every 100 females, there were 102.5 males. For every 100 females age 18 and over, there were 99.7 males.

The median income for a household in the community was $86,290, and the median income for a family was $88,637. Males had a median income of $66,490 versus $40,156 for females. The per capita income for the CDP was $33,027. About 0.9% of families and 1.6% of the population were below the poverty line, including 3.9% of those under age 18 and none of those age 65 or over.
