= Nelson Cook =

American portraitist and poet (1808–1892)

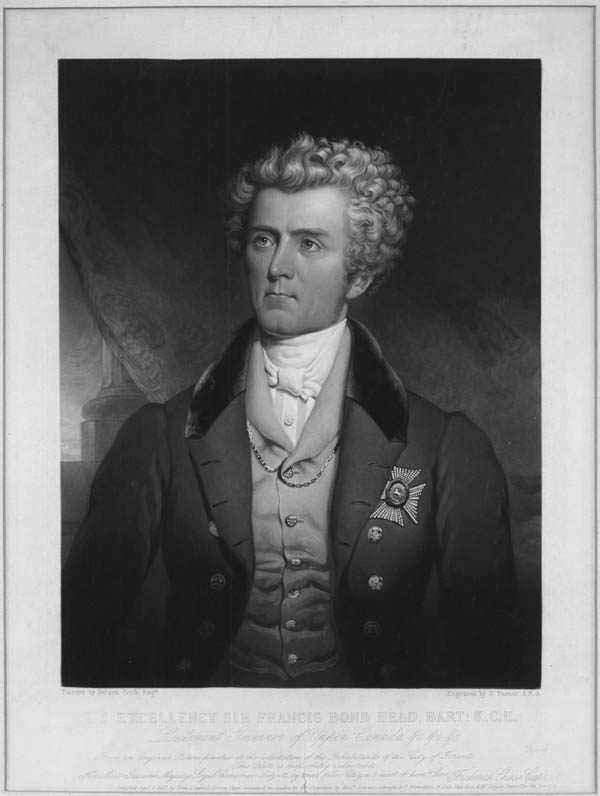
Engraving of Francis Bond Head from a portrait by Nelson Cook, 1837

Nelson Cook (1808–1892) was an American portraitist and "occasional poet".

== Biography ==
Cook was born in Malta, New York in 1808, one of nine children of furniture maker Joseph Cook and Mary Ann Tolman, originally from Wallingford, Connecticut. He moved to Toronto Canada around 1830, where he worked as an agent for his brother Ransom and took up painting. He returned to New York in 1840 and settled in Saratoga Springs.

Cook was a self-taught artist and over 170 of his portraits have been found, including many prominent people from Canada, Saratoga Springs, Rochester, Buffalo, Rome, Utica and elsewhere. His work is in museums and private collections mostly in the Northeastern US and Ontario, Canada.

Nelson Cook was married to Esther Freeman and had one daughter, Marion, born in Canada.

He died in Saratoga Springs in 1892 and is believed to be buried in Greenridge Cemetery.

== See also ==
- Ransom Cook
