= East Line Union Cemetery =

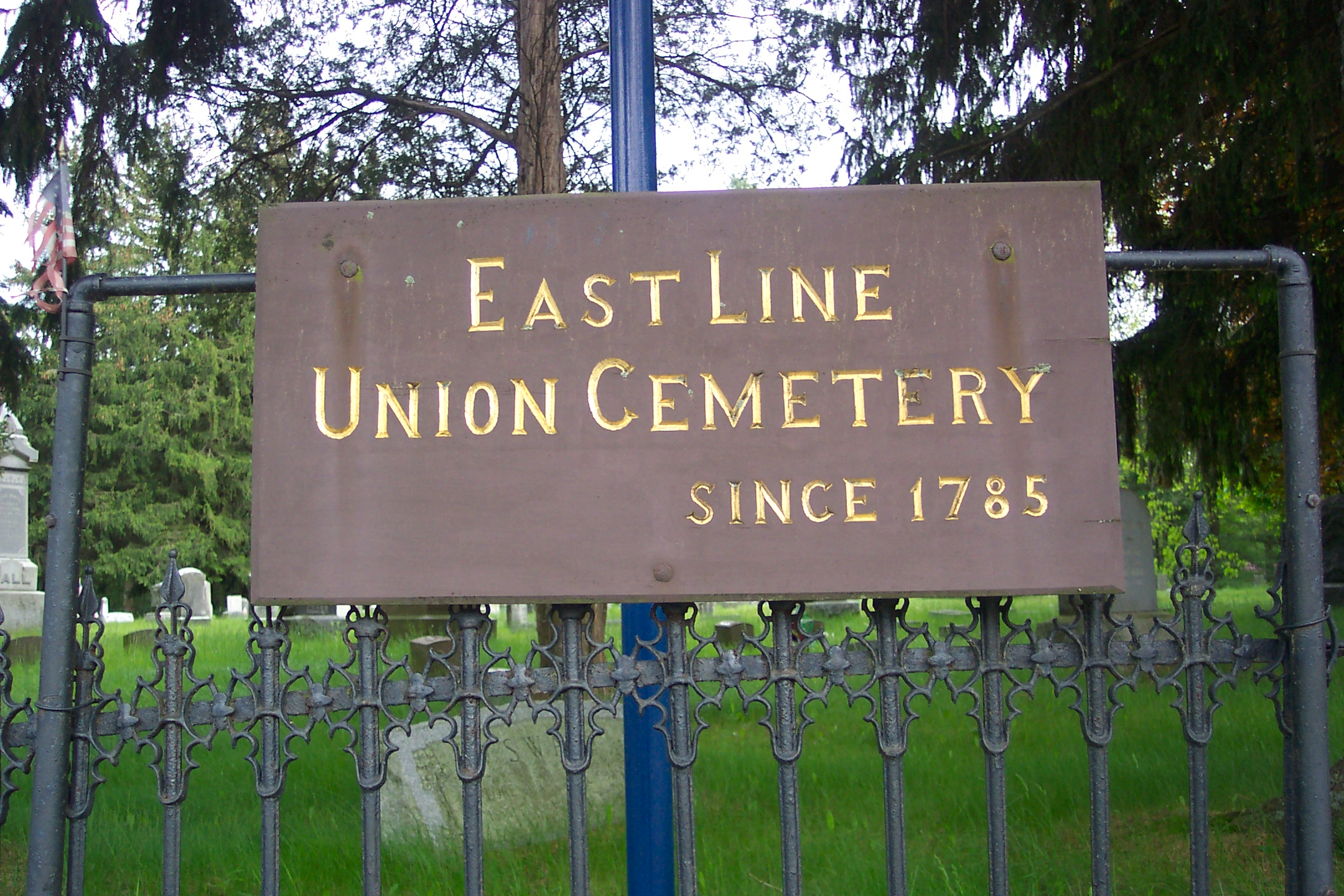
- Interactive map of East Line Union Cemetery

Details
- Established: September 6, 1919
- Location: Malta, New York
- Country: United States
- Coordinates: 42°56′04″N 73°49′30″W
- Type: Private
- Owned by: East Line Union Cemetery Association INC
- Size: 2 acres (0.81 ha)
- No. of graves: 600 (est)
- Find a Grave: East Line Union Cemetery

East Line Union Cemetery , also known as the Armstrong Corners Cemetery, is a cemetery, located at the corner of Round Lake road (county road 80) and East Line road (county road 82) in the southwest corner of Malta, New York, in Saratoga County. The cemetery was designated as a historic landmark by the town of Malta in 1993.

== History ==
Although not formally incorporated until September 6, 1919, graves within the cemetery date back to the 1700s with the oldest being from 1785. The cemetery contains the graves of 20 veterans of the American Revolution. There are also over 50 unmarked graves within the grounds.

The East Line Union Cemetery is operated by the Nonprofit organization East Line Union Cemetery Association INC.
