= Ballston Creek =

Stream in Saratoga County, New York, U.S.

Coordinates: 42°57′52″N 73°49′21″W

Ballston Creek, also called Shenantaha Creek from the Iroquois name for Ballston Lake ("deep water"), is a stream in Saratoga County, New York. It originates at the north end of Ballston Lake and runs approximately six miles (9.7 km) through the towns of Ballston and Malta, descending 100 feet before exiting into Round Lake.

"Some geologists find evidence to convince them that there was a period ... when the Mohawk, after its turn at Scotia, continued northeast and flowed through Ballston Lake, then turned southeast coursing its way through the wide valley of Ballston Creek into Round Lake, then down the Anthony Kill to the Hudson."

The Rensselaer and Saratoga Railroad, later merged with the Delaware and Hudson, largely followed the path of Ballston Creek north of the village of Round Lake. The former rail bed is now part of the Zim Smith multi-use trail.

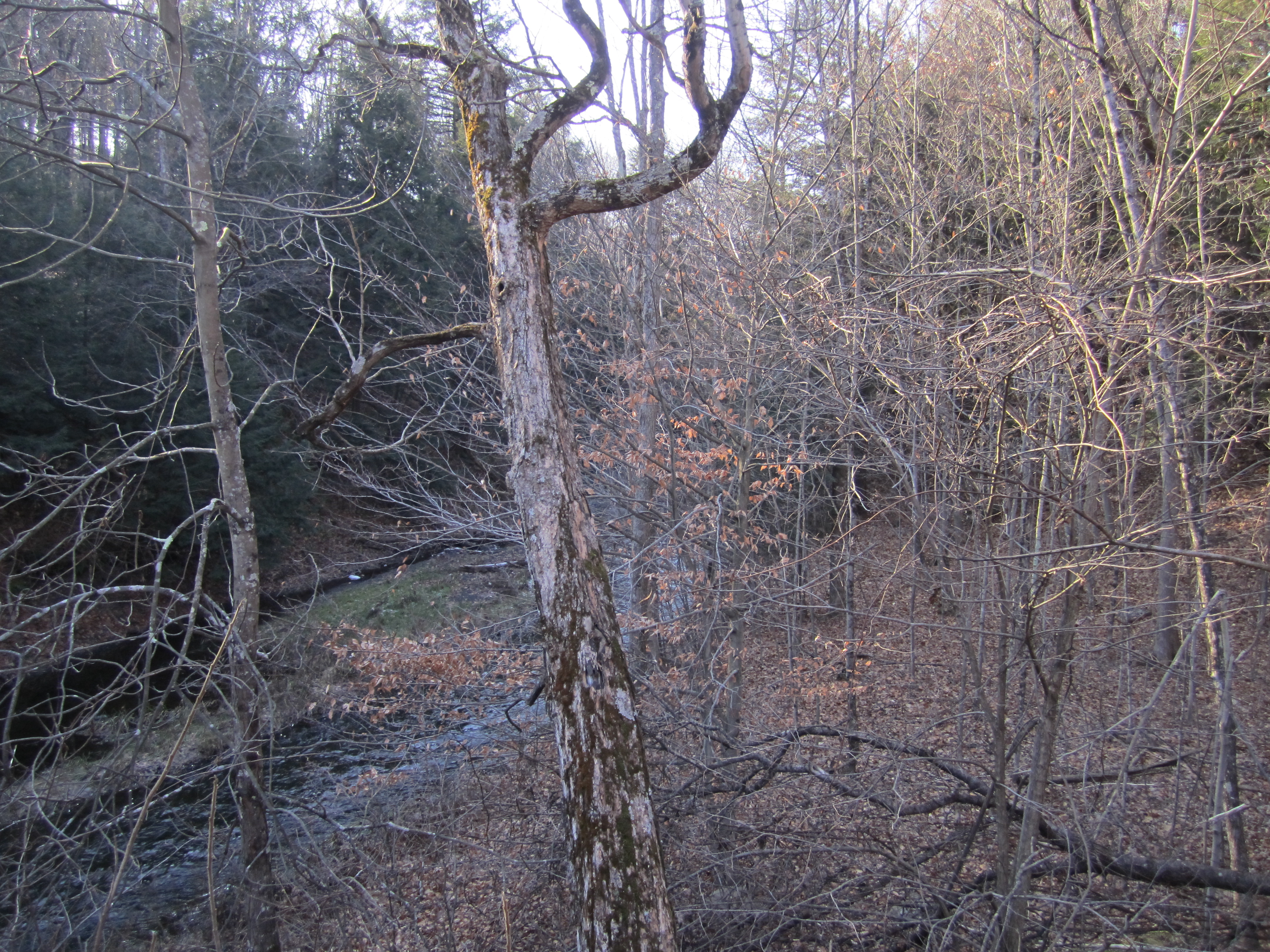
Ballston Creek at Ruhle Road, Malta NY
