= Moravia Union Cemetery =

Historic cemetery in New York, United States

- U.S. National Register of Historic Places
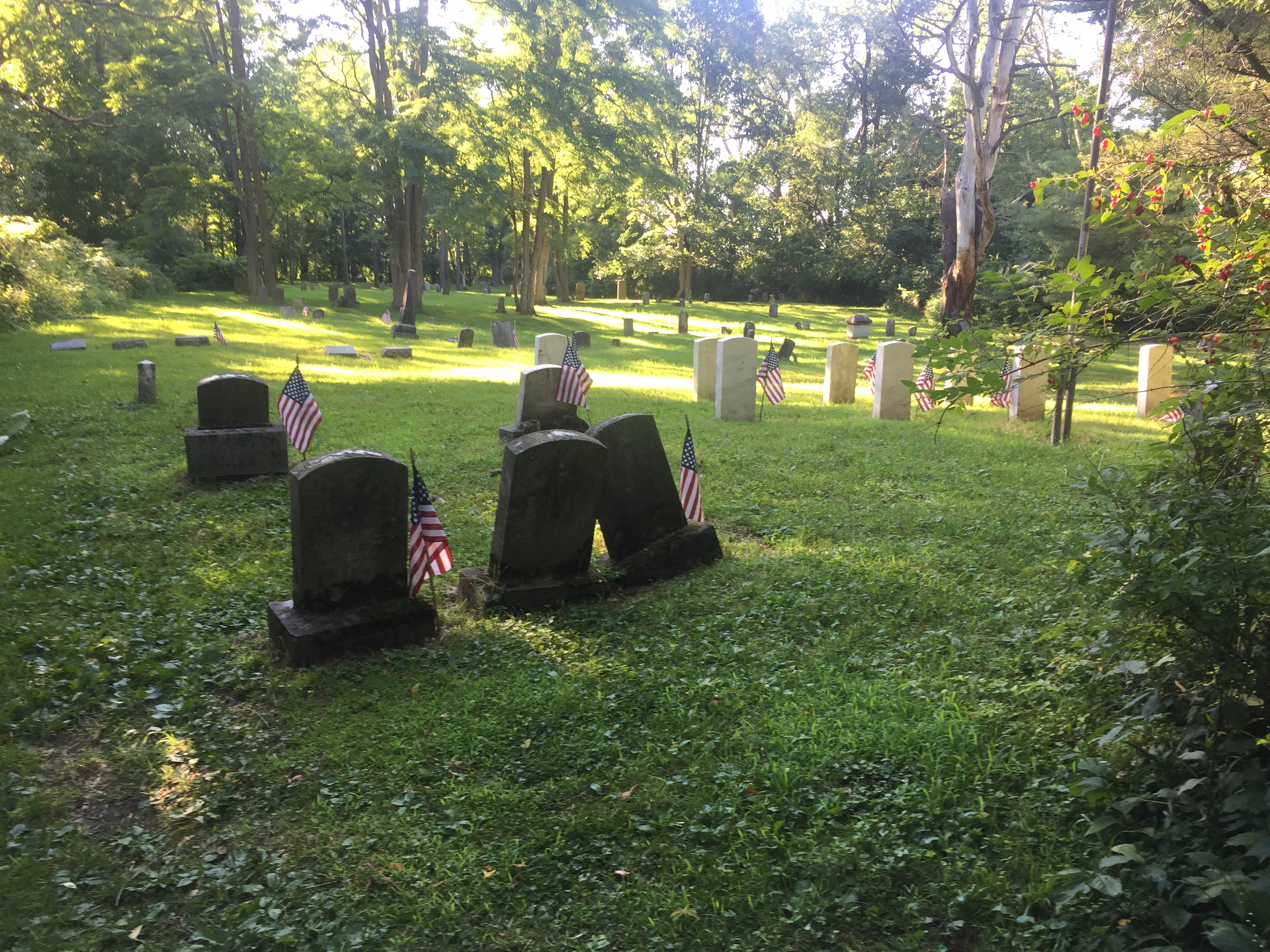
- Cemetery in 2022

- Location within New York Location within the United States
- Location: NY 38, Moravia, New York
- Coordinates: 42°42′7″N 76°25′4″W
- Area: 3 acres (1.2 ha)
- Built: 1807
- MPS: Moravia MPS
- NRHP reference No.: 95001278
- Added to NRHP: November 7, 1995

Moravia Union Cemetery, also known as Dry Creek Cemetery, is a historic cemetery located in the village of Moravia in Cayuga County, New York. The cemetery opened in 1807 and is believed to contain the graves of approximately 350 individuals. Approximately 180 headstones and monuments remain standing. A number of headstones exhibit typical New England–style funerary art from the early 19th century. It contains the graves of many of the village of Moravia's earliest settlers.

It was listed on the National Register of Historic Places in 1995.

Some have epitaphs, some of which can be determined to be from hymns, e.g. by Charles Wesley or by ___.

- An 1831 death's gravestone has words of this hymn (appearing in an 1857 collection of hymnal hits): "How peaceful is the closing scene where..."
- Another cites "I am Going the Way of all the Earth" by Charles Wesley: "Pass a few fleeting years..." See https://hymnary.org/text/pass_a_few_swiftly_fleeting_years#pagescans this pagescan from what year?
- Another epitaph has been used elsewhere nearby:
  - In the town hall of Caroline, New York, this.
  - Roe Cemetery:
  - Perry Cemetery in Sempronius in Cayuga County: here
- And one about "exiles" and "servants": here.
