= Malta, New York =

Malta
- Town
- Town of Malta
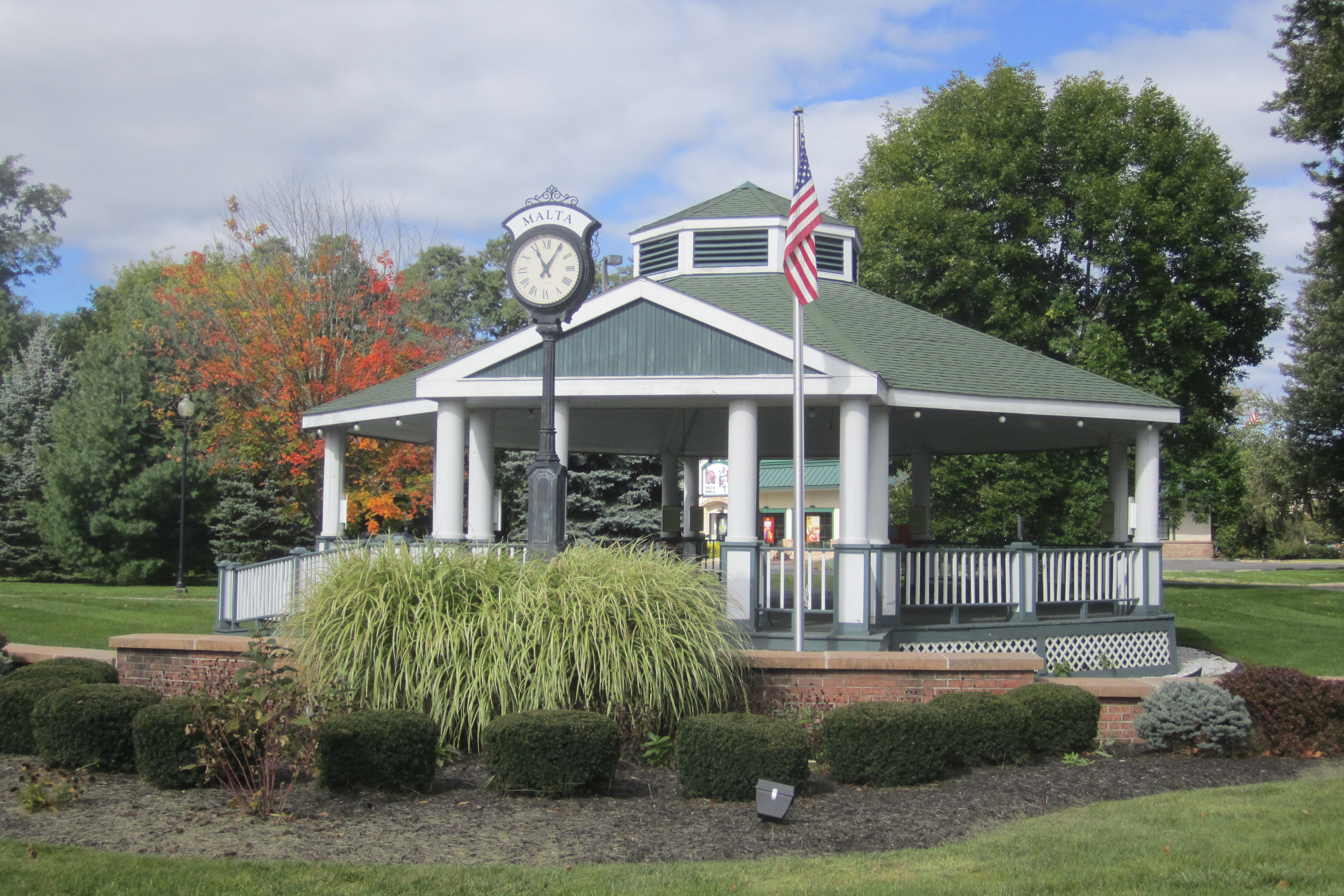
- Malta Corners, US Route 9 and NY Route 67, Gazebo in 2013

- Seal

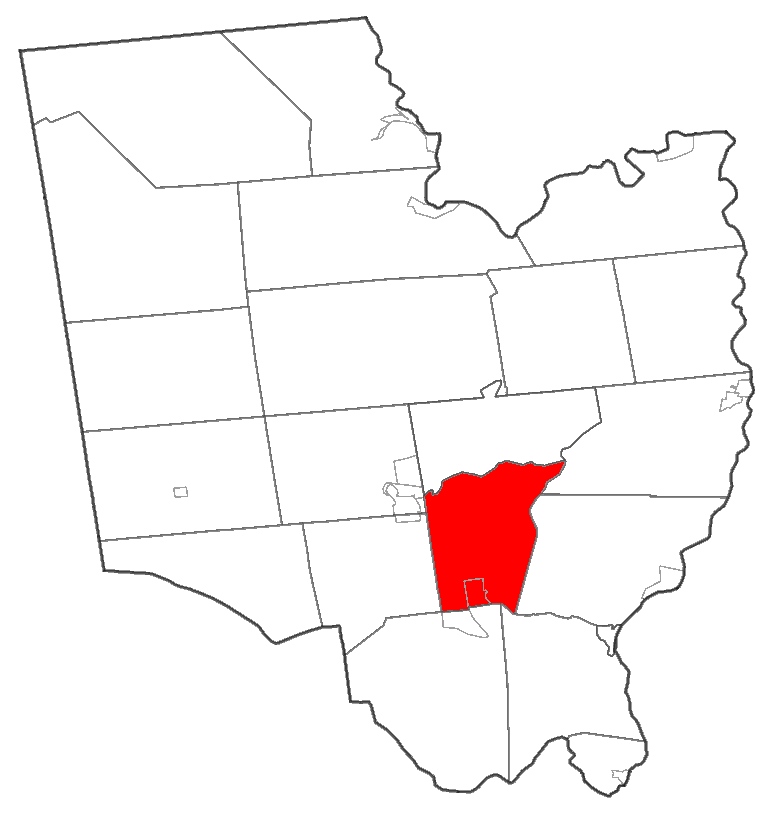
- Location within Saratoga County

- Location within the state of New York
- Coordinates: 42°58′N 73°48′W
- Country: United States
- State: New York
- County: Saratoga
- Created: March 3, 1802

Area
  - Total: 31.46 sq mi (81.47 km^{2})
  - Land: 27.92 sq mi (72.32 km^{2})
  - Water: 3.53 sq mi (9.15 km^{2})
- Elevation: 325 ft (99 m)

Population (2020)
  - Total: 17,130
  - Density: 613.5/sq mi (236.86/km^{2})
- Time zone: UTC-5 (Eastern (EST))
  - Summer (DST): UTC-4 (EDT)
- ZIP code: 12020
- Area code: 518
- FIPS code: 36-44743
- GNIS feature ID: 0979186
- Website: Town website

Malta is a town in Saratoga County, New York, United States. The town is in the central part of the county and is south of Saratoga Springs. The population was 17,130 as of the 2020 census.

Malta, along with Stillwater, is home to the Luther Forest Technology Campus, a 1,414-acre (572 ha) technology industry manufacturing site which includes semiconductor company GlobalFoundries.

== History ==
Tradition says Peter Drummond and Daniel McAlpin were early settlers, but, as Loyalists, they fled as the Revolutionary War came closer to the area. The earliest documented settlement occurred around 1771, with many of the settlers migrating from Connecticut. According to various sources, Michael Dunning may have been the first, while others included John Rhodes, Jeheil Parks, Samuel Clark, Luther Landon, Dean Chase, Ebenezer Valentine, Ebenezer Dibble, Ebenezer Millard, Obadiah Tompkins, Reuben Doolittle, Cornelius Abeel, Stephen Ireland, Robert Hemple, and William Marvin.

The town, originally called Dunning Street, was formed in 1802 from part of the Town of Stillwater. More territory was gained from the Town of Saratoga in 1805. The name "Malta" is said to be derived from a malt brewery in the area that was formerly called "Malt-ville" and is now Maltaville.

The village of Round Lake was founded in 1868 as "the Round Lake Camp Meeting of the Methodist Episcopical Church." Attendance the first year was 8000. In 1869 permanent cottages began to be built, replacing the original tents. In 1969, the community of Round Lake became an incorporated village within the town.

The Dunning Street Cemetery, Ruhle Road Lenticular Metal Truss Bridge, and Wiggins-Collamer House are listed on the National Register of Historic Places.

== Geography ==
According to the United States Census Bureau, the town has a total area of 31.4 square miles (81 km^{2}), of which 28.0 square miles (73 km^{2}) is land and 3.4 square miles (8.8 km^{2}) (10.71%) is water.

Part of the eastern town line is marked by Saratoga Lake. The Kayaderosseras Creek marks the northern town boundary.

Exits 11, 12, and 13 of Interstate 87 ("The Adirondack Northway," or simply "The Northway") and US Route 9 pass through roughly the center of the town. New York State Route 9P is a short highway in the eastern part of the town. New York State Route 67 is a highway, partly conjoined with US-9, in the southern part of Malta.

== Demographics ==
Historical population
Census	Pop.	Note	%±
1820	1,518		—
1830	1,517		−0.1%
1840	1,457		−4.0%
1850	1,349		−7.4%
1860	1,240		−8.1%
1870	1,212		−2.3%
1880	1,234		1.8%
1890	1,285		4.1%
1900	1,322		2.9%
1910	1,285		−2.8%
1920	1,152		−10.4%
1930	1,277		10.9%
1940	1,354		6.0%
1950	1,882		39.0%
1960	2,223		18.1%
1970	3,813		71.5%
1980	6,968		82.7%
1990	11,709		68.0%
2000	13,005		11.1%
2010	14,765		13.5%
2020	17,130		16.0%
U.S. Decennial Census

As of the census of 2000, there were 13,005 people, 5,295 households, and 3,537 families residing in the town. The population density was 464.2 inhabitants per square mile (179.2/km^{2}). There were 5,754 housing units at an average density of 205.4 per square mile (79.3/km^{2}). The racial makeup of the town was 96.24% White, 1.08% African American, 0.28% Native American, 1.05% Asian, 0.02% Pacific Islander, 0.52% from other races, and 0.82% from two or more races. Hispanic or Latino of any race were 1.45% of the population.

There were 5,295 households, out of which 34.4% had children under the age of 18 living with them, 55.6% were married couples living together, 7.9% had a female householder with no husband present, and 33.2% were non-families. 24.6% of all households were made up of individuals, and 6.0% had someone living alone who was 65 years of age or older. The average household size was 2.45 and the average family size was 2.96.

In the town, the population was spread out, with 25.6% under the age of 18, 6.4% from 18 to 24, 36.6% from 25 to 44, 22.9% from 45 to 64, and 8.6% who were 65 years of age or older. The median age was 36 years. For every 100 females, there were 100.4 males. For every 100 females age 18 and over, there were 99.7 males.

The median income for a household in the town was $57,037, and the median income for a family was $68,239. Males had a median income of $41,509 versus $31,126 for females. The per capita income for the town was $25,972. About 0.8% of families and 2.4% of the population were below the poverty line, including 1.5% of those under age 18 and 5.2% of those age 65 or over.

== Communities and locations in Malta ==
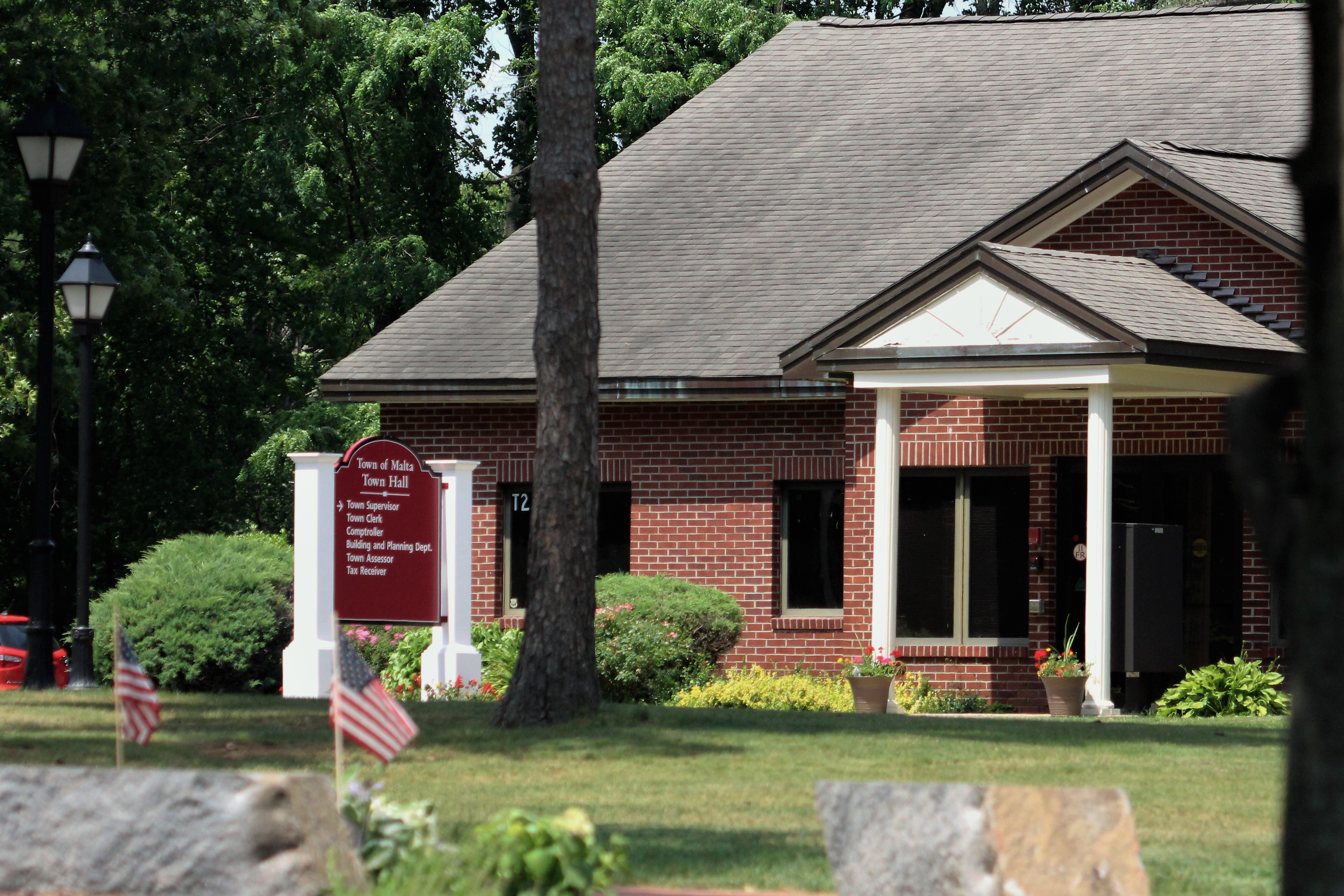
Malta Town Hall

- Country Knolls – A hamlet at the southern town line.
- East Line – A hamlet at the west town line, so-called because it is located at the eastern line of the Town of Ballston.
- Francis Corners – A hamlet east of Malta Ridge on County Route 63.
- Luther Forest, a large housing development off Dunning Street near Saratoga Lake, formerly a pioneering reforestation project, and later site of the Malta Test Station rocket fuel and ordnance test site.
- Malta – The hamlet of Malta is located on US Route 9 in the southern part of the town.
- Maltaville – A hamlet north of Round Lake, located on US Route 9.
- Malta Ridge – A hamlet on US Route 9 near the center of the town.
- Mannings Cove – A lakeside hamlet on Saratoga Lake.
- Riley Cove (China Town) – A hamlet on the shore of Saratoga Lake, south of Manning Cove.
- Round Lake – A lake in the western part of the town; it was called "Tanendahowa" by the early natives of the area. The lake is linked to a smaller lake, "Little Round Lake."
- Round Lake village – A village on the western side of Round Lake, southwest of Malta village and located on US Route 9.
- Round Lake airport (W57) – A small grass runway airport east of Round Lake.
- Saratoga Lake – A lake by the northeastern part of the town.
- Malta Corners – The intersection of US Route 9 with NY Route 67/Dunning Street. Formerly also called "Dunning Street Corners."
- Halls Corners – A hamlet located at the intersection of East High St, Brownell Rd, and Van Aernem Rd.

== Economy ==
- State Farm Operations Center
- GlobalFoundries Semiconductor Fabrication "Fab 8"
- Saratoga Technology + Energy Park (STEP) facility of New York State Energy Research and Development Authority (NYSERDA), a "technology park devoted to clean energy, energy efficient, and environmental technologies."

== Transportation ==
Malta is the center of an excellent road network; most transportation is by private car. The Capital District Transportation Authority (CDTA) operates scheduled buses through downtown Malta between Clifton Park and Saratoga Springs with connections to other lines. Commuter bus service to Albany is provided by the CDTA's "Northway Express" and Upstate Tours between Round Lake and Albany. Air service is provided from Saratoga County Airport (general aviation 5B2), 8 miles (13 km), and Albany International Airport (ALB), 20 miles (32 km). Amtrak provides train service from Saratoga Springs, 9 miles (14 km) or Albany/Rensselaer, 28 miles (45 km).

== Educational institutions ==
Most of the Town of Malta is part of the Ballston Spa Central School District. Portions of the towns are served by the Shenendehowa Central School District and Saratoga Springs City School District.

Other educational institutions in Malta include:

- Hudson Valley Community College TEC-SMART facility at NYSERDA's Saratoga Technology and Energy Park, 345 Hermes Road.
- Bryant & Stratton College, Bluth Building, 2452 US Route 9.

== Notable people ==
Residents of Malta are known as "Maltese".

- Perhaps the most illustrious native of Malta was Elmer Ellsworth, born in Malta in 1837, who was reputed to be the first casualty of the American Civil War.
- The Cook family, including Ransom, an inventor, and his brother Nelson, a portraitist, lived in East Line.
- George Crum, the purported inventor of the potato chip was a lifelong Malta resident, and operated a restaurant Crum's Place near Saratoga Lake.
- James M. and Thomas J. Marvin were born in East Line.

== Points of interest ==
- East Line Union Cemetery
- Malta Drive-In theatre, 2785 Route 9, built in 1949, is one of only 450 remaining drive-ins in the US.
- Parade Ground historic district, Dunning Street. The green space along both sides of Dunning Street was donated in 1776 by Captain Michael Dunning and used as a militia training ground during the American Revolution, the War of 1812, and the Civil War
- Ruhle Road Lenticular Metal Truss Bridge
- "South Hill", 165 Cramer Road, home of novelist Katherine Anne Porter from 1941 to 1946; later home of George Willison.
- Shenantaha Creek Park
- Zim Smith Trail, the only nationally registered trail in New York
- Albany-Saratoga Speedway, 2671 U.S. Route 9
