= Zim Smith Trail =

Recreational trail in Saratoga County, New York

Coordinates: 42.919326°N 73.746549°W

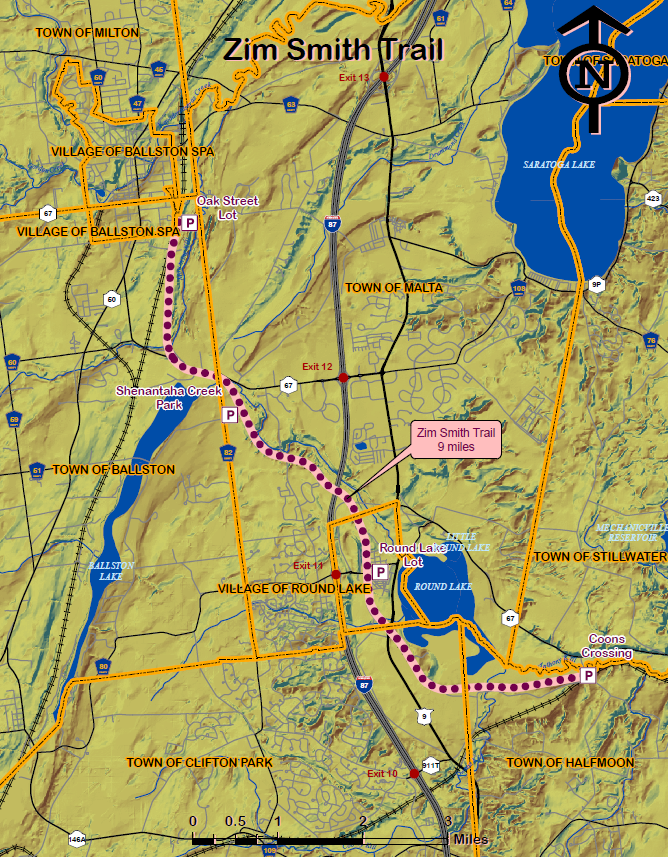
Map of the Zim Smith Trail in Saratoga County prior to the expansion into Mechanicville

The Zim Smith Trail is the main multi-use trail of a network of trails in Saratoga County, New York. Extending twelve miles, it connects the cities and towns of Mechanicville, Halfmoon, Clifton Park, Round Lake Village, Malta and Ballston Spa. The trail is the route of the former Delaware & Hudson Railroad, originally the Rensselaer & Saratoga Railroad which was completed in 1836. It is the only trail in New York state to be designated a national recreation trail by the U.S. Department of Interior and National Park Service.

The trail starts at Oak Street in Ballston Spa and runs through Malta's Shenantaha Creek Park. From there the trail passes under Interstate 87, the Adirondack Northway, and brings you through the village of Round Lake. From Round Lake Village the trail crosses over U.S. Route 9 and through a portion of the towns of Clifton Park and Halfmoon. As of 2020, it has now been extended to the city of Mechanicville. There are future plans to extend the trail north to Saratoga Springs.

The Zim Smith Trail is named after Lt. Col. Zimri "Zim" Smith, USAF (Ret) who died in 1994. Zim was active in historic preservation in Saratoga Springs and founded Friends of Saratoga Battlefield.
