= Ballston Lake =

- Shanantaha (Mohawk)
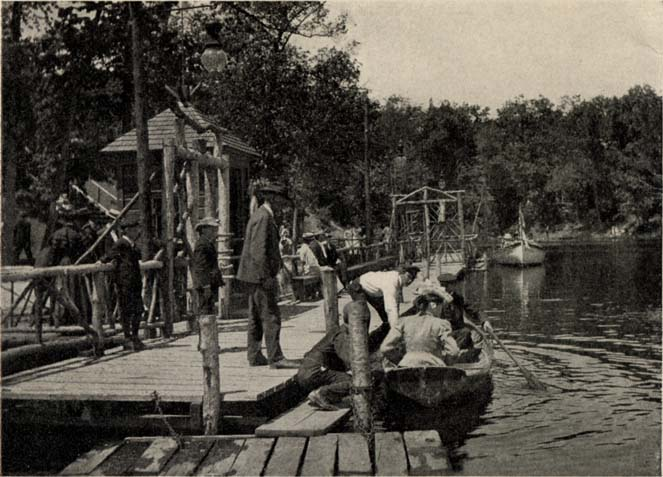
- Ballston Lake around 1910

- Location within New York Ballston Lake (the United States)
- Location: Saratoga County, New York, United States
- Coordinates: 42°56′20″N 73°51′28″W
- Type: Lake
- Primary outflows: Ballston Creek
- Basin countries: United States
- Surface area: 269 acres (1.09 km^{2})
- Average depth: 22 feet (6.7 m)
- Max. depth: 90 feet (27 m)
- Shore length^{1}: 7.1 miles (11.4 km)
- Surface elevation: 249 feet (76 m)
- Settlements: Burnt Hills, New York
- ^{1} Shore length is not a well-defined measure.

Ballston Lake is located in the hamlet of Ballston Lake, New York in the town of Ballston. This narrow 3.7-mile (6.0 km)-long lake with an unknown maximum depth in the south of the region, was called Shanantaha or Sha-nen-da-ho-ra by natives. It was known to early white settlers as Long Lake. The lake was part of the Mohawk River during the glacial age and archeological digs have unearthed artifacts indicating settlement around the lake as early as 3,500 BCE.

For a long time the depth of Ballston Lake was not determined, due to the multiple caves that prevented divers from going to the bottom. There has been an artifact found that is dated 2000 B.C.

Fish species present in the lake include northern pike, smallmouth bass, largemouth bass, yellow perch, carp, pumpkinseed sunfish, walleye, bluegill, black crappie, redfin pickerel and brown bullhead.

The lake is meromictic, meaning its deeper waters never mix with the surface layer.

In 2021 both the cartop boat launch on Outlet Road and the private one located at Finnigan's On The Lake Restaurant were closed, leaving no public boating access to the lake.

In February 2022, the public fishing pier on the north end of the lake was closed due to damage sustained by ice over the winter.

== See also ==
- Ballston, New York
