= Wallkill, New York =

Wallkill is the name of some places in the U.S. state of New York:

- Wallkill, Orange County, New York, a town
- Wallkill, Ulster County, New York, a hamlet

== See also ==
- Wallkill River
