= Round Lake (Saratoga County, New York) =

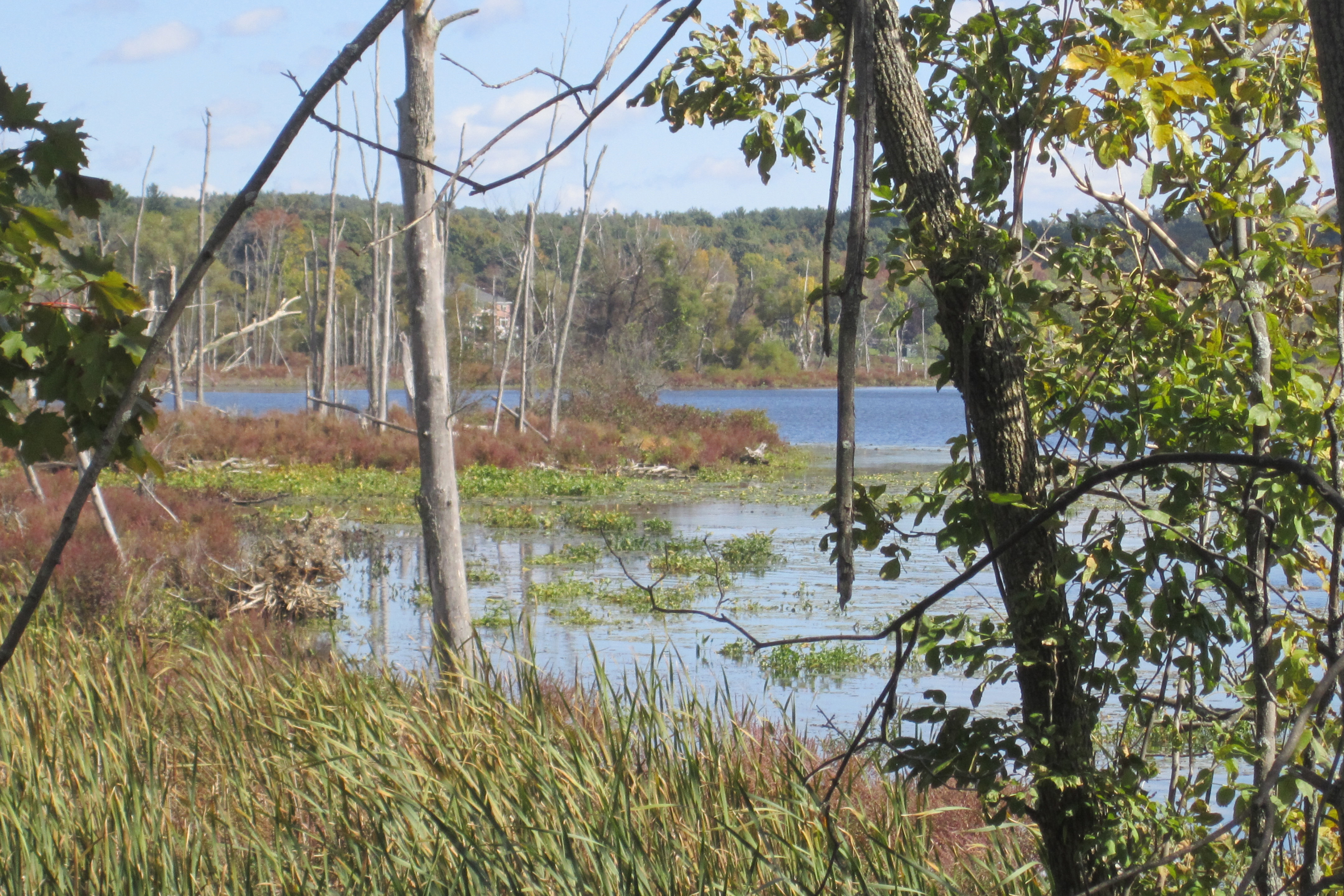
- Outlet of Ballston Creek at Round Lake

- Location within New York Round Lake (the United States)
- Location: Saratoga County, New York, United States
- Coordinates: 42°56′05″N 73°46′56″W
- Type: Lake
- Primary inflows: Ballston Creek
- Primary outflows: Anthony Kill
- Basin countries: United States
- Surface area: 356 acres (1.44 km^{2})
- Average depth: 7 feet (2.1 m)
- Max. depth: 23 feet (7.0 m)
- Shore length^{1}: 2.7 miles (4.3 km)
- Surface elevation: 154 feet (47 m)
- Settlements: Round Lake, New York
- ^{1} Shore length is not a well-defined measure.

Round Lake is a small lake in Saratoga County, New York that is located east of the village of Round Lake. Fish species present in the lake are northern pike, tiger muskie, largemouth bass, carp, pumpkinseed sunfish, and brown bullhead. There is a carry down access located on the west shore off US-9.

Round Lake is a "kettle lake", formed at the end of the Wisconsin glaciation by a large block of ice left behind as the glacier melted. Outflow from the Iromohawk River deposited large amounts of debris around the block. Over time the river's course changed and the block melted, leaving the depression that became Round Lake.
