= Ivy League men's basketball tournament =

Annual college basketball tournament

- Sport: College basketball
- Conference: Ivy League
- Number of teams: 4
- Format: Single-elimination tournament
- Current stadium: Pizzitola Sports Center (2025)
- Current location: Providence, RI (2025)
- Played: 2017–2019, 2022–present
- Last contest: 2026
- Current champion: Penn Quakers
- Most championships: Yale (4)
- TV partner(s): ESPNU, ESPN2
- Official website: Website

Host stadiums
- Palestra (2017–2018); John J. Lee Amphitheater (2019); Canceled (2020–2021); Lavietes Pavilion (2022); Jadwin Gymnasium (2023); Levien Gymnasium (2024); Pizzitola Sports Center (2025)

Host locations
- Philadelphia, PA (2017–2018); New Haven, CT (2019); Canceled (2020–2021); Boston, MA (2022); Princeton, NJ (2023); New York, NY (2024); Providence, RI (2025)

The Ivy League men's basketball tournament is the postseason conference tournament in men's basketball for the Ivy League. It was first held in 2017, and is held alongside the Ivy women's tournament, also introduced in 2017, at the same venue. The overall event is currently marketed as Ivy Madness. The Ivy League was the last NCAA Division I conference without a postseason tournament.

The tournament follows a single-elimination format that involves the top four schools in the standings at the end of the regular season. Two semifinal games are held on the first day (Saturday) with the No. 1 seed playing the No. 4 seed and the No. 2 seed playing the No. 3 seed, followed by the championship game played the next day (Sunday). This schedule format mimics much of the conference season, where road trips usually consist of two games at two sites on Fridays and Saturdays (or Saturdays and Sundays) to minimize time spent out of classes. As such, the tournament has the tagline "The Ultimate Back-To-Back". The tournament's winner receives the league's automatic bid to the NCAA Division I men's basketball tournament.

The team or teams that finish with the best record after the 14-game regular-season conference schedule will continue to be recognized as Ivy League champion.

Prior to the tournament, the Ivy League's automatic bid to the NCAA tournament was awarded to the conference champion as determined by the regular season standings. In the event of a tie between two teams a one-game playoff was used to determine which team would receive the league bid to the NCAA tournament. This happened on eight occasions. In 2001–02, a three-team, two game tournament was held when three teams tied for the league title.

The first two tournaments (2017 and 2018) were held at the Palestra on the campus of the University of Pennsylvania in Philadelphia. The 2019 tournament was held at Yale University. On February 27, 2019, the Ivy League announced that the tournament would continue to be held at a predetermined site, rotating annually through the remaining member schools through 2025 in the following order: Harvard, Princeton, Brown, Cornell, Dartmouth and Columbia. Due to the COVID-19, the 2020 tournament due to be held at Harvard was canceled and league champion Yale was awarded the league's automatic bid to the NCAA Tournament. The Ivy League canceled its entire 2020–21 season due to continued COVID-19 concerns. The tournament resumed in 2022 and was hosted by Harvard, followed by Princeton in 2023. In February 2023 the Ivy League announced it would be deviating from the previously announced order and that Columbia would host the 2024 tournament rather than Brown. In February 2024 the Ivy League announced another schedule change. Brown will host in 2025, Cornell in 2026 and Dartmouth in 2027.

== Tournament champions ==
| Year | Champion | Score | Runner-up | Tournament MVP | Location |
|---|---|---|---|---|---|
| 2017 | (1) Princeton | 71–59 | (3) Yale | Myles Stephens, Princeton | Palestra (Philadelphia, PA) |
| 2018 | (2) Penn | 68–65 | (1) Harvard | A. J. Brodeur, Penn | Palestra (Philadelphia, PA) |
| 2019 | (2) Yale | 97–85 | (1) Harvard | Alex Copeland, Yale | John J. Lee Amphitheater (New Haven, CT) |
| 2020 | None^{†} | — | — | — | Lavietes Pavilion (Boston, MA) |
| 2021 | None^{††} | — | — | — | Jadwin Gymnasium (Princeton, NJ) |
| 2022 | (2) Yale | 66–64 | (1) Princeton | Azar Swain, Yale | Lavietes Pavilion (Boston, MA) |
| 2023 | (2) Princeton | 74–65 | (1) Yale | Tosan Evbuomwan, Princeton | Jadwin Gymnasium (Princeton, NJ) |
| 2024 | (2) Yale | 62–61 | (4) Brown | Danny Wolf, Yale | Levien Gymnasium (New York, NY) |
| 2025 | (1) Yale | 90–84 | (2) Cornell | John Poulakidas, Yale | Pizzitola Sports Center (Providence, RI) |
| 2026 | (3) Penn | 88–84 (OT) | (1) Yale | T. J. Power, Penn | Newman Arena (Ithaca, NY) |
| 2027 | | | | | Leede Arena (Hanover, NH) |

† Yale was awarded the conference's automatic bid after the Ivy League Tournament was canceled due to the Coronavirus pandemic. According to Ivy League policy, the first-place team in the regular season is deemed the league champion.

†† The Ivy League cancelled all winter athletics for the 2020–21 season on November 12, 2020, due to the ongoing COVID-19 pandemic.

== Tournament championships by school ==
| School | Championships | Championship Years |
|---|---|---|
| Yale | 4 | 2019, 2022, 2024, 2025 |
| Princeton | 2 | 2017, 2023 |
| Penn | 2 | 2018, 2026 |
| Brown | 0 | |
| Columbia | 0 | |
| Cornell | 0 | |
| Dartmouth | 0 | |
| Harvard | 0 | |

== Ivy League Tournament appearances ==
| Team | Bids | Years | Record |
|---|---|---|---|
| Yale | 8 | 2017–2019, 2022–2026 | 9–3 |
| Princeton | 6 | 2017, 2019, 2022–2025 | 5–4 |
| Cornell | 6 | 2018, 2022–2026 | 1–4 |
| Penn | 6 | 2017–2019, 2022, 2023, 2026 | 2–4 |
| Harvard | 4 | 2017–2019, 2026 | 2–3 |
| Brown | 1 | 2024 | 1–1 |
| Dartmouth | 1 | 2025 | 0–1 |

As of 2025, Columbia is the only school yet to qualify for the Ivy League Tournament.
‡ The 2020 Ivy League Tournament was canceled due to COVID-19.

== NCAA Tournament appearances ==
Prior to the introduction of the Ivy League Tournament in 2017 the league's automatic bid to the NCAA tournament was awarded to the Ivy League Champion as determined by the regular season standings. In the event of a tie a playoff was held to determine the bid recipient. However, the league title is still shared.

| Appearances | School | Last Appearance | Last Win | Last Sweet Sixteen | Last Elite Eight | Last Final Four | Last Final | Last Championship | Record |
|---|---|---|---|---|---|---|---|---|---|
| 26 | Princeton | 2023 | 2023 | 2023 | 1965 | 1965 | | | 15–29 |
| 24 | Pennsylvania | 2018 | 1994 | 1979 | 1979 | 1979 | | | 13–26 |
| 7 | Dartmouth | 1959 | 1958 | 1958 | 1958 | 1944 | 1944 | | 10–7 |
| 7 | Yale | 2024 | 2024 | | 1949 | | | | 1–6 |
| 5 | Cornell | 2010 | 2010 | 2010 | | | | | 2–6 |
| 5 | Harvard | 2015 | 2014 | | | | | | 2–6 |
| 3 | Columbia | 1968 | 1968 | 1968 | | | | | 2–4 |
| 2 | Brown | 1986 | | | 1939 | | | | 0–2 |
| Total: 76 | | | | | | | | | 43-85 |
