= 2025–26 Ivy League men's basketball season =

- League: NCAA Division I
- Sport: Basketball
- Teams: 8
- TV partner: Ivy League Digital Network

Regular season
- League champions: Yale
- Runners-up: Harvard
- Season MVP: Nick Townsend, Yale

Tournament
- Champions: Penn
- Runners-up: Yale
- Finals MVP: TJ Power, Penn

Basketball seasons
- 2024–25 2026–27

2025–26 Ivy League men's basketball standings
	Conf.				Overall
Team	W		L	PCT	W		L	PCT
Yale	11	–	3	.786	24	–	7	.774
Harvard	10	–	4	.714	17	–	12	.586
Penn †	9	–	5	.643	18	–	12	.600
Cornell	8	–	6	.571	15	–	13	.536
Columbia	5	–	9	.357	16	–	12	.571
Dartmouth	5	–	9	.357	11	–	16	.407
Princeton	5	–	9	.357	9	–	20	.310
Brown	3	–	11	.214	9	–	18	.333
† 2026 Ivy League tournament winner

The 2025–26 Ivy League men's basketball season marked the continuation of the annual tradition of competitive basketball among Ivy League members. The tradition began when the league was formed during the 1956–57 season and its history extends to the predecessor Eastern Intercollegiate Basketball League, which was formed in 1902.

== Coaches ==
Team	Head coach	Seasons at school	Previous Job	Overall record at school	Ivy League record	Ivy regular season championships	Ivy tournament championships	NCAA tournaments	NCAA Final Fours
Brown	Mike Martin	13th	Penn (asst.)	162–184 (.468)	70–98 (.417)	0	0	0	0
Columbia	Kevin Hovde	1st	Florida (asst.)	0–0 (–)	0–0 (–)	0	0	0	1 (Note: As an assistant coach at Florida.)
Cornell	Jon Jaques	2nd	Cornell (assoc. HC)	18–11 (.621)	9–5 (.643)	0	0	0	0
Dartmouth	David McLaughlin	10th	Northeastern (asst.)	75–145 (.341)	36–76 (.321)	0	0	0	2 (Note: With Stonehill at the Division II level.)
Harvard	Tommy Amaker	19th	Michigan	304–194 (.610)	148–90 (.622)	7	0	4	0
Penn	Fran McCaffery	1st	Iowa	0–0 (–)	0–0 (–)	0	0	12 (Note: With Lehigh, UNCG, Siena, and Iowa.)	0
Princeton	Mitch Henderson	14th	Northwestern (asst.)	251–133 (.654)	125–55 (.694)	4	2	2	0
Yale	James Jones	26th	Ohio (asst.)	418–319 (.567)	225–125 (.643)	7	4	5	0

Notes:

- All conference titles are from time with current school, unless noted.
- Overall and Ivy records are from time at current school through the end of the 2024–25 season.

== Preseason ==
=== Preseason coaches poll ===
2025–26 Ivy League Preseason Poll
Rank	Team	Points (First place votes)
1	Yale	168 (21)
2	Harvard	126
3	Cornell	124
4	Princeton	97
5	Dartmouth	72
6	Brown	68
7	Penn	66
8	Columbia	35

== Players of the week ==
Week	Player of the Week	Rookie of the Week
Nov. 9	Nick Townsend, Yale	Miles Franklin, Columbia
Nov. 16	Cooper Noard, Cornell & Dalen Davis, Princeton	Isaiah Langham, Brown
Nov. 23	Ethan Roberts, Penn	Isaiah Langham (2), Brown
Nov. 30	Nick Townsend (2), Yale	Dalton Scantlebury, Penn
Dec. 7	Robert Hinton, Harvard	Miles Franklin (2), Columbia
Dec. 14	Kenny Noland, Columbia	Dalton Scantlebury (2), Penn
Dec. 21	Cooper Noard (2), Cornell	Connor Igoe, Columbia
Dec. 28	Kenny Noland (2), Columbia	Miles Franklin (3), Columbia
Jan. 4	AJ Levine, Penn & Jack Stanton, Princeton	Landon Clark, Princeton
Jan. 11	Connor Amundsen, Dartmouth & Jackson Hicke, Princeton	Miles Franklin (4), Columbia
Jan. 19	Nick Townsend (3), Yale	Isaiah Langham (3), Brown & Landon Clark (2), Princeton
Jan. 26	Kenny Noland (3), Columbia	Isaiah Langham (4), Brown
Feb. 1	Robert Hinton (2), Harvard	Connor Igoe (2), Columbia
Feb. 8	TJ Power, Penn	Connor Igoe (3), Columbia
Feb. 15	Landon Lewis, Brown	Miles Franklin (5), Columbia
Feb. 22	Tey Barbour, Harvard	Isaiah Langham (5), Brown

School	POTW	ROTW
Brown	1	5
Columbia	3	8
Cornell	2	0
Dartmouth	1	0
Harvard	3	0
Penn	3	2
Princeton	3	2
Yale	3	0

== Conference matrix ==
	Brown	Columbia	Cornell	Dartmouth	Harvard	Penn	Princeton	Yale
vs. Brown	–	0−0	0−0	0−0	0–0	0−0	0−0	0–0
vs. Columbia	0−0	−	0−0	0−0	0–0	0−0	0−0	0–0
vs. Cornell	0−0	0−0	−	0−0	0–0	0−0	0−0	0–0
vs. Dartmouth	0−0	0−0	0−0	−	0–0	0−0	0−0	0–0
vs. Harvard	0−0	0−0	0−0	0−0	–	0−0	0−0	0–0
vs. Penn	0−0	0−0	0−0	0−0	0–0	−	0−0	0–0
vs. Princeton	0−0	0−0	0−0	0−0	0–0	0−0	−	0–0
vs. Yale	0−0	0−0	0−0	0−0	0–0	0−0	0−0	–
Total	0−0	0−0	0−0	0−0	0–0	0−0	0−0	0–0

== Honors and awards ==
=== All-Conference awards and teams ===
The Ivy League announced its all-conference teams and major honors on March 11, 2026.

Honor	Recipient
Player of the Year	Nick Townsend, Yale
Coaching Staff of the Year	Harvard
Coaching Staff of the Year	Yale
Defensive Player of the Year	Casey Simmons, Yale
Rookie of the Year	Connor Igoe, Columbia
First Team
First Team	Robert Hinton, Harvard
First Team	TJ Power, Penn
First Team	Nick Townsend, Yale
First Team	Jake Fiegen, Cornell
First Team	Landon Lewis, Brown
Second Team
Second Team	Kenny Noland, Columbia
Second Team	Cooper Noard, Cornell
Second Team	Thomas Batties II, Harvard
Second Team	Chandler Piggé, Harvard
Second Team	Ethan Roberts, Penn
Second Team	Isaac Celiscar, Yale
Honorable Mention	Brandon Mitchell-Day, Dartmouth
Honorable Mention	Dalen Davis, Princeton
Honorable Mention	Casey Simmons, Yale

== NCAA tournament ==
Seed	Region	School	First Four	Round of 64	Round of 32	Sweet 16	Elite Eight	Final Four	Championship
14	South	Penn	Bye	L 70–105 vs. (3) Illinois	DNP				
		W–L (%):	0–0 –	1–0 .000	0–1 –	0–0 –	0–0 –	0–0 –	0–0 –
Total: 0–1 (.000)
