= 2025–26 Cornell Big Red men's basketball team =

American college basketball season

2025–26 Cornell Big Red men's basketball
- Conference: Ivy League
- Record: 15–13 (8–6 Ivy)
- Head coach: Jon Jaques (2nd season)
- Associate head coach: Nat Graham
- Assistant coaches: Luke Colwell; Jalen Hayes
- Home arena: Newman Arena

2025–26 Ivy League men's basketball standings
	Conf.				Overall
Team	W		L	PCT	W		L	PCT
Yale	11	–	3	.786	24	–	5	.828
Harvard	10	–	4	.714	17	–	12	.586
Penn	9	–	5	.643	17	–	11	.607
Cornell	8	–	6	.571	15	–	13	.536
Columbia	5	–	9	.357	16	–	12	.571
Dartmouth	5	–	9	.357	11	–	16	.407
Princeton	5	–	9	.357	9	–	20	.310
Brown	3	–	11	.214	9	–	18	.333
† 2026 Ivy League tournament winner As of March 14, 2026

The 2025–26 Cornell Big Red men's basketball team represented Cornell University in the 2025–26 NCAA Division I men's basketball season. The Big Red, led by second-year head coach Jon Jaques, played their home games at Newman Arena in Ithaca, New York, as members of the Ivy League.

== Previous season ==
The Big Red finished the 2024–25 season 17–10, 9–5 in Ivy League play to finish in second place. They qualified for the Ivy League tournament, defeating Dartmouth in the semifinals before losing to Yale in the championship game.

== Roster ==
2025–26 Cornell Big Red men's basketball team
Players
Coaches

Pos.	#	Name	Height	Weight	Year	Hometown
G	0	DaMaryon Fishburn	6 ft 5 in (1.96 m)	190 lb (86 kg)	Jr	Detroit, Michigan
G	1	Elijah Griffin	6 ft 2 in (1.88 m)	165 lb (75 kg)	Fr	Kenosha, Wisconsin
F	2	Ian Imegwu	6 ft 9 in (2.06 m)	238 lb (108 kg)	Jr	Short Hills, New Jersey
F	3	Jax Abalos	6 ft 8 in (2.03 m)	200 lb (91 kg)	Fr	Batavia, Illinois
F	4	Gioacchino Panzini	6 ft 5 in (1.96 m)	200 lb (91 kg)	So	Spring Lake, New Jersey
G	5	Jacob Beccles	6 ft 3 in (1.91 m)	183 lb (83 kg)	Jr	Philadelphia, Pennsylvania
G	7	Anthony Nimani	6 ft 4 in (1.93 m)	186 lb (84 kg)	So	Meriden, Connecticut
G	8	Adam Hinton	6 ft 4 in (1.93 m)	215 lb (98 kg)	Sr	Studio City, California
G	10	Mateen Rafiq	6 ft 0 in (1.83 m)	155 lb (70 kg)	So	Sacramento, California
F/C	11	Ty Iwanonkiw	6 ft 9 in (2.06 m)	202 lb (92 kg)	So	Pittsburgh, Pennsylvania
G	12	Ryan Burbach	6 ft 3 in (1.91 m)	185 lb (84 kg)	Fr	Phoenix, Arizona
G/F	13	AJ Rodriguez	6 ft 6 in (1.98 m)	205 lb (93 kg)	So	Westchester County, New York
G	14	Corbin Zentner	5 ft 9 in (1.75 m)	167 lb (76 kg)	Sr	Alpine, Utah
F	15	Blake Lecklinter	6 ft 9 in (2.06 m)	210 lb (95 kg)	Fr	Prosper, Texas
F	21	Kaspar Sepp	6 ft 7 in (2.01 m)	220 lb (100 kg)	Jr	Tartu, Estonia
G	22	Jake Fiegen	6 ft 4 in (1.93 m)	205 lb (93 kg)	Sr	Wilmette, Illinois
F	23	DJ Nix	6 ft 6 in (1.98 m)	224 lb (102 kg)	Sr	Harrisburg, North Carolina
G	24	Josh Baldwin	6 ft 5 in (1.96 m)	240 lb (109 kg)	Sr	Everett, Massachusetts
G	31	Cooper Noard	6 ft 2 in (1.88 m)	195 lb (88 kg)	Sr	Glenview, Illinois
F/C	34	AJ LaBeau	6 ft 10 in (2.08 m)	222 lb (101 kg)	Jr	Boise, Idaho

Head coach

- Jon Jaques (Cornell)

Assistant coach(es)

- Nat Graham (Penn)
- Luke Colwell (South Carolina)
- Jalen Hayes (Drexel)

Legend

- (C) Team captain
- (S) Suspended
- (I) Ineligible
- (W) Walk-on
- Injured
- Current redshirt

Roster
Last update: October 29, 2025

== Schedule and results ==
Date time, TV	Rank^{#}	Opponent^{#}	Result	Record	Site (attendance) city, state
Non-conference regular season
November 7, 2025*; 6:00 p.m., ESPN+		at Kent State	L 102–110	0–1	MAC Center (1,870); Kent, OH
November 9, 2025*; 2:00 p.m., ESPN+		at Illinois State	L 65−76	0−2	CEFCU Arena (4,086); Normal, IL
November 13, 2025*; 6:00 p.m., ESPN+		at Lafayette	W 97–78	1–2	Kirby Sports Center (1,279); Easton, PA
November 18, 2025*; 8:00 p.m., ESPN+		Army	W 86–73	2–2	Newman Arena; Ithaca, NY
November 20, 2025*; 7:00 p.m., ESPN+		Colgate	W 95−94 ^{2OT}	3−2	Newman Arena (744); Ithaca, NY
November 26, 2025*; 12:00 p.m., ESPN+		Misericordia	W 114−70	4−2	Newman Arena (612); Ithaca, NY
November 30, 2025*; 2:00 p.m., ESPN+		at Bucknell	W 101−72	5−2	Sojka Pavilion (861); Lewisburg, PA
December 2, 2025*; 7:00 p.m., ESPN+		at George Mason	L 81–99	5–3	EagleBank Arena (3,633); Fairfax, VA
December 3, 2025*; 7:00 p.m., FloHoops		at Towson	L 80–93	5–4	TU Arena (2,215); Towson, MD
December 7, 2025*; 7:00 p.m., ESPN+		at Samford	L 90–93	5–5	Pete Hanna Center (1,413); Homewood, AL
December 21, 2025*; 2:00 p.m., ESPN+		at Albany	W 83–75	6–5	Broadview Center (2,568); Albany, NY
December 29, 2025*; 7:00 p.m., FS1		at No. 9 Michigan State	L 97–114	6–6	Breslin Center (14,797); East Lansing, MI
January 2, 2026*; 2:00 p.m., ESPN+		Alfred State	W 133–65	7–6	Newman Arena (1,333); Ithaca, NY
Ivy League regular season
January 5, 2026; 5:00 p.m., ESPN+		Columbia	L 99–104	7–7 (0–1)	Newman Arena (1,444); Ithaca, NY
January 10, 2026; 2:00 p.m., ESPN+		Dartmouth	L 91–102	7–8 (0–2)	Newman Arena; Ithaca, NY
January 17, 2026; 2:00 p.m., ESPN+		at Yale	L 68–102	7–9 (0–3)	John J. Lee Amphitheater (1,620); New Haven, CT
January 19, 2026; 2:00 p.m., ESPN+		at Brown	W 89–67	8–9 (1–3)	Pizzitola Sports Center (476); Providence, RI
January 24, 2026; 2:00 p.m., ESPN+		at Harvard	W 86–79	9–9 (2–3)	Lavietes Pavilion (1,636); Boston, MA
January 30, 2026; 6:00 p.m., ESPN+		Princeton	W 87–64	10–9 (3–3)	Newman Arena (922); Ithaca, NY
January 31, 2026; 6:00 p.m., ESPN+		Penn	L 81–91	10–10 (3–4)	Newman Arena (1,202); Ithaca, NY
February 7, 2026; 2:00 p.m., ESPN+		at Columbia	W 88–67	11–10 (4–4)	Levien Gymnasium (1,752); New York, NY
February 13, 2026; 7:00 p.m., ESPN+		at Princeton	W 89–65	12–10 (5–4)	Jadwin Gymnasium (1,630); Princeton, NJ
February 14, 2026; 6:00 p.m., ESPN+		at Penn	L 76–82	12–11 (5–5)	The Palestra (1,837); Philadelphia, PA
February 21, 2026; 2:00 p.m., ESPN+		Harvard	L 54–73	12–12 (5–6)	Newman Arena (1,844); Ithaca, NY
February 27, 2026; 6:00 p.m., ESPNU		Yale	W 72–69	13–12 (6–6)	Newman Arena; Ithaca, NY
February 28, 2026; 6:00 p.m., ESPN+		Brown	W 86–80	14–12 (7–6)	Newman Arena (1,944); Ithaca, NY
March 7, 2026; 2:00 p.m., ESPN+		at Dartmouth	W 111–90	15–12 (8–6)	Leede Arena (1,210); Hanover, NH
Ivy League Tournament
March 14, 2026; 11:00 a.m., ESPNU	(4)	(1) Yale; Semifinals	L 76–88	15–13	Newman Arena; Ithaca, NY
*Non-conference game. ^{#}Rankings from AP Poll. (#) Tournament seedings in parentheses. All times are in Eastern.
