= 2025–26 Columbia Lions men's basketball team =

American college basketball season

2025–26 Columbia Lions men's basketball
- Conference: Ivy League
- Record: 16–12 (5–9 Ivy)
- Head coach: Kevin Hovde (1st season)
- Assistant coaches: Mark McGonigal; Shasha Brown; Matt Elkin
- Home arena: Levien Gymnasium

2025–26 Ivy League men's basketball standings
	Conf.				Overall
Team	W		L	PCT	W		L	PCT
Yale	11	–	3	.786	24	–	7	.774
Harvard	10	–	4	.714	17	–	12	.586
Penn †	9	–	5	.643	18	–	12	.600
Cornell	8	–	6	.571	15	–	13	.536
Columbia	5	–	9	.357	16	–	12	.571
Dartmouth	5	–	9	.357	11	–	16	.407
Princeton	5	–	9	.357	9	–	20	.310
Brown	3	–	11	.214	9	–	18	.333
† 2026 Ivy League tournament winner

The 2025–26 Columbia Lions men's basketball team represented Columbia University during the 2025–26 NCAA Division I men's basketball season. The Lions, led by first-year head coach Kevin Hovde, played their home games at Levien Gymnasium in New York City as members of the Ivy League.

== Previous season ==
The Lions finished the 2024–25 season 12–15, 1–13 in Ivy League play to finish in eighth place. They failed to qualify for the Ivy League tournament.

On March 10, 2025, Lions' head coach Jim Engles announced his resignation. On March 24, the school named Florida assistant Kevin Hovde as the team's next head coach.

== Roster ==
2025–26 Columbia Lions men's basketball team
Players
Coaches

Pos.	#	Name	Height	Weight	Year	Hometown
G	0	Edwin Bai	6 ft 2 in (1.88 m)	170 lb (77 kg)	Fr	Hong Kong
G	1	Avery Brown	6 ft 4 in (1.93 m)	190 lb (86 kg)	Sr	Beacon Falls, Connecticut
G	2	Kenny Noland	6 ft 2 in (1.88 m)	185 lb (84 kg)	Sr	Apex, North Carolina
F	3	Blair Thompson	6 ft 8 in (2.03 m)	210 lb (95 kg)	Sr	New York, New York
G	4	Gerald O'Keefe	6 ft 3 in (1.91 m)	195 lb (88 kg)	So	Nashville, Tennessee
G	5	Nicolo Romanelli	6 ft 2 in (1.88 m)	175 lb (79 kg)	Jr	Sydney, Australia
F	6	Leland Coleman	6 ft 7 in (2.01 m)	190 lb (86 kg)	So	Richmond, Virginia
G	7	Hampton Sanders	6 ft 0 in (1.83 m)	185 lb (84 kg)	Jr	South Brunswick, New Jersey
G	8	Josiah Cunningham	6 ft 2 in (1.88 m)	190 lb (86 kg)	So	Long Beach, California
F	10	Connor Igoe	6 ft 7 in (2.01 m)	240 lb (109 kg)	Fr	Brooklyn, New York
F	11	Nigel Clarkson	6 ft 8 in (2.03 m)	195 lb (88 kg)	So	Fayetteville, North Carolina
F	12	Ryan Soulis	6 ft 10 in (2.08 m)	230 lb (104 kg)	So	Athens, Greece
F	14	Mason Ritter	6 ft 9 in (2.06 m)	255 lb (116 kg)	So	Bowling Green, Kentucky
G	21	Dan Vessey	6 ft 3 in (1.91 m)	205 lb (93 kg)	Jr	Plainsboro, New Jersey
F	22	Richard Nweke	6 ft 7 in (2.01 m)	230 lb (104 kg)	Jr	Anambra, Nigeria
F	23	Zine Eddine Bedri	6 ft 10 in (2.08 m)	235 lb (107 kg)	Sr	Tébessa, Algeria
G	24	Miles Franklin	6 ft 5 in (1.96 m)	200 lb (91 kg)	Fr	Vienna, Virginia

Head coach

- Kevin Hovde (Richmond)

Assistant coach(es)

- Mark McGonigal (Richmond)
- Shasha Brown (Wesleyan)
- Matt Elkin (Northeastern)

Legend

- (C) Team captain
- (S) Suspended
- (I) Ineligible
- (W) Walk-on
- Injured
- Current redshirt

Roster
Last update: October 31, 2025

== Schedule and results ==
Date time, TV	Rank^{#}	Opponent^{#}	Result	Record	Site (attendance) city, state
Non-conference regular season
November 7, 2025*; 1:00 p.m., NEC Front Row		at New Haven; UConn MTE	W 71–53	1–0	Hazell Center (783); West Haven, CT
November 10, 2025*; 6:30 p.m., FS1		at No. 3 UConn; UConn MTE	L 62–89	1–1	Gampel Pavilion (10,244); Storrs, CT
November 13, 2025*; 7:00 p.m., ESPN+		UMass Lowell; UConn MTE	W 86–72	2–1	Levien Gymnasium (704); New York, NY
November 18, 2025*; 7:00 p.m., ESPN+		Boston University	W 54–49	3–1	Levien Gymnasium (761); New York, NY
November 21, 2025*; 6:00 p.m., ESPN+		at Lehigh	W 82–67	4–1	Stabler Arena (612); Bethlehem, PA
November 23, 2025*; 2:00 p.m., ESPN+		Longwood	W 95–70	5–1	Levien Gymnasium (793); New York, NY
November 26, 2025*; 7:00 p.m., ESPN+		at Fairfield	W 106–77	6–1	Leo D. Mahoney Arena (1,529); Fairfield, CT
November 29, 2025*; 2:00 p.m., ESPN+		Sarah Lawrence	W 92–44	7–1	Levien Gymnasium (629); New York, NY
December 3, 2025*; 7:00 p.m., ESPN+		Hofstra	W 72–70	8–1	Levien Gymnasium (671); New York, NY
December 6, 2025*; 5:30 p.m., ESPN+		Albany	W 93–65	9–1	Levien Gymnasium (1,023); New York, NY
December 9, 2025*; 7:00 p.m., FloCollege		at Stony Brook	L 73–77 ^{OT}	9–2	Stony Brook Arena (1,196); Stony Brook, NY
December 21, 2025*; 5:00 p.m., ACCNX		at California	L 56–74	9–3	Haas Pavilion (3,283); Berkeley, CA
December 28, 2025*; 2:00 p.m., ESPN+		at North Florida	W 90–82	10–3	UNF Arena (1,169); Jacksonville, FL
December 31, 2025*; 2:00 p.m., ESPN+		Penn State Abington	W 106–51	11–3	Levien Gymnasium (636); New York, NY
Ivy League regular season
January 5, 2026; 5:00 p.m., ESPN+		at Cornell	W 104–99	12–3 (1–0)	Newman Arena (1,444); Ithaca, NY
January 10, 2026; 2:00 p.m., ESPN+		Harvard	L 54–79	12–4 (1–1)	Levien Gymnasium (1,634); New York, NY
January 17, 2026; 2:00 p.m., ESPN+		at Brown	L 80–86 ^{OT}	12–5 (1–2)	Pizzitola Sports Center (479); Providence, RI
January 19, 2026; 2:00 p.m., ESPN+		at Yale	L 74–91	12–6 (1–3)	John J. Lee Amphitheater (1,652); New Haven, CT
January 24, 2026; 2:00 p.m., ESPN+		at Dartmouth	W 79–69	13–6 (2–3)	Leede Arena (1,264); Hanover, NH
January 30, 2026; 7:00 p.m., ESPN+		Penn	W 72–67	14–6 (3–3)	Levien Gymnasium (1,918); New York, NY
January 31, 2026; 6:00 p.m., ESPN+		Princeton	L 68–80	14–7 (3–4)	Levien Gymnasium (1,826); New York, NY
February 7, 2026; 2:00 p.m., ESPN+		Cornell	L 67–88	14–8 (3–5)	Levien Gymnasium (1,752); New York, NY
February 13, 2026; 7:00 p.m., ESPN+		at Penn	L 67–76	14–9 (3–6)	The Palestra (1,365); Philadelphia, PA
February 14, 2026; 6:00 p.m., ESPN+		at Princeton	W 75–65	15–9 (4–6)	Jadwin Gymnasium (2,769); Princeton, NJ
February 21, 2026; 2:00 p.m., ESPN+		Dartmouth	L 63–64	15–10 (4–7)	Levien Gymnasium (1,538); New York, NY
February 27, 2026; 7:00 p.m., ESPN+		Brown	W 80–62	16–10 (5–7)	Levien Gymnasium (1,504); New York, NY
February 28, 2026; 6:00 p.m., ESPN+		Yale	L 50–64	16–11 (5–8)	Levien Gymnasium (2,026); New York, NY
March 6, 2026; 7:00 p.m., ESPN+		at Harvard	L 71–81	16–12 (5–9)	Lavietes Pavilion (1,636); Boston, MA
*Non-conference game. ^{#}Rankings from AP Poll. (#) Tournament seedings in parentheses. All times are in Eastern Time.
