= 2025–26 Dartmouth Big Green men's basketball team =

American college basketball season

2025–26 Dartmouth Big Green men's basketball
- Conference: Ivy League
- Record: 11–16 (5–9 Ivy)
- Head coach: David McLaughlin (9th season)
- Assistant coaches: Jabari Trotter; Ryan Kapustka; Taurus Samuels
- Home arena: Leede Arena

2025–26 Ivy League men's basketball standings
	Conf.				Overall
Team	W		L	PCT	W		L	PCT
Yale	11	–	3	.786	23	–	5	.821
Harvard	10	–	4	.714	17	–	11	.607
Penn	9	–	5	.643	16	–	11	.593
Cornell	8	–	6	.571	15	–	12	.556
Columbia	5	–	9	.357	16	–	12	.571
Dartmouth	5	–	9	.357	11	–	16	.407
Princeton	5	–	9	.357	9	–	20	.310
Brown	3	–	11	.214	9	–	18	.333
† 2026 Ivy League tournament winner As of March 7, 2026

The 2025–26 Dartmouth Big Green men's basketball team represented Dartmouth College during the 2025–26 NCAA Division I men's basketball season. The Big Green, led by ninth-year head coach David McLaughlin, played their home games at Leede Arena in Hanover, New Hampshire as members of the Ivy League.

== Previous season ==
The Big Green finished the 2024–25 season 14–14, 8–6 in Ivy League play to finish in a tie for third place. In the Ivy League tournament, they were defeated by Cornell in the semifinals.

== Roster ==
2025–26 Dartmouth Big Green men's basketball team
Players
Coaches

Pos.	#	Name	Height	Weight	Year	Hometown
G	0	Ben Brown	6 ft 2 in (1.88 m)	198 lb (90 kg)	Jr	Manchester, England
G	4	Reem Thomas	6 ft 5 in (1.96 m)	195 lb (88 kg)	So	Wilmington, Delaware
G	5	Cameron McNamee	6 ft 6 in (1.98 m)	195 lb (88 kg)	So	Mission Viejo, California
F	7	Patrick Tivnan Jr.	6 ft 8 in (2.03 m)	210 lb (95 kg)	Jr	Charlotte, North Carolina
C	10	Anton Strelnikov	6 ft 8 in (2.03 m)	225 lb (102 kg)	Fr	Lake Zurich, Illinois
G	11	Cam Hiatt	6 ft 4 in (1.93 m)	195 lb (88 kg)	Fr	Edmonds, Washington
F	21	Brandon Mitchell-Day	6 ft 8 in (2.03 m)	205 lb (93 kg)	Sr	St. Louis, Missouri
F	22	Jayden Williams	6 ft 6 in (1.98 m)	185 lb (84 kg)	Sr	Windermere, Florida
G	23	Niko Abusara	6 ft 5 in (1.96 m)	195 lb (88 kg)	Jr	Chicago, Illinois
G	30	Connor Amundsen	5 ft 11 in (1.8 m)	165 lb (75 kg)	So	Fresno, California
F	33	Jackson Munro	6 ft 8 in (2.03 m)	220 lb (100 kg)	Sr	Wilmette, Illinois
F	44	Shanon Simango	6 ft 8 in (2.03 m)	—	So	Maputo, Mozambique
F	50	Tyler Garrett	6 ft 10 in (2.08 m)	235 lb (107 kg)	Fr	Potomac, Maryland

Head coach

- David McLaughlin (Colby)

Assistant coach(es)

- Jabari Trotter (Dartmouth)
- Ryan Kapustka (Michigan)
- Taurus Samuels (Dartmouth)

Legend

- (C) Team captain
- (S) Suspended
- (I) Ineligible
- (W) Walk-on
- Injured
- Current redshirt

Roster
Last update: October 22, 2025

== Schedule and results ==
Date time, TV	Rank^{#}	Opponent^{#}	Result	Record	Site (attendance) city, state
Non-conference regular season
November 9, 2025*; 2:00 pm, ESPN+		Marist	L 56−75	0−1	Leede Arena (894); Hanover, NH
November 12, 2025*; 8:30 pm, ESPN+		at Bryant	L 75–82	0–2	Chace Athletic Center (783); Smithfield, RI
November 16, 2025*; 12:00 pm, ESPN+		Appalachian State	L 77–85	0–3	Leede Arena (807); Hanover, NH
November 18, 2025*; 7:00 pm, ESPN+		UMaine Augusta	W 113–68	1–3	Leede Arena (750); Hanover, NH
November 29, 2025*; 2:00 pm, ESPN+		at Saint Peter's	W 87–61	2–3	Run Baby Run Arena (430); Jersey City, NJ
December 3, 2025*; 3:00 pm, ESPN+		New Hampshire; Rivalry	W 69–68	3–3	Leede Arena (864); Hanover, NH
December 6, 2025*; 4:00 pm, MW Network		at Wyoming	L 80–93	3–4	Arena-Auditorium (3,422); Laramie, WY
December 9, 2025*; 9:00 pm, MW Network		at Colorado State	L 55–76	3–5	Moby Arena (5,321); Fort Collins, CO
December 13, 2025*; 2:00 pm, ESPN+		Boston University	W 77−64	4−5	Leede Arena (898); Hanover, NH
December 16, 2025*; 6:00 pm, ESPN+		at Holy Cross	W 89–64	5–5	Hart Center (690); Worcester, MA
December 19, 2025*; 11:00 am, ESPN+		at Sacred Heart	L 63–85	5–6	William H. Pitt Center; Fairfield, CT
December 29, 2025*; 6:00 pm, SECN		at No. 22 Florida	L 72–94	5–7	O'Connell Center (10,917); Gainesville, FL
January 1, 2026*; 1:00 pm, ESPN+		Elms	W 107–43	6–7	Leede Arena (909); Hanover, NH
Ivy League regular season
January 5, 2026; 7:00 pm, ESPN+		at Harvard	W 76–68	7–7 (1–0)	Lavietes Pavilion (824); Boston, MA
January 10, 2026; 2:00 pm, ESPN+		at Cornell	W 102–91	8–7 (2–0)	Newman Arena; Ithaca, NY
January 17, 2026; 3:00 pm, ESPN+		Penn	L 74–84	8–8 (2–1)	Leede Arena; Hanover, NH
January 19, 2026; 6:00 pm, ESPN+		Princeton	W 71–69	9–8 (3–1)	Leede Arena (915); Hanover, NH
January 24, 2026; 7:00 pm, ESPN+		Columbia	L 69–79	9–9 (3–2)	Leede Arena (1,264); Hanover, NH
January 30, 2026; 7:00 pm, ESPN+		at Yale	L 68–83	9–10 (3–3)	John J. Lee Amphitheater (1,074); New Haven, CT
January 31, 2026; 6:00 pm, ESPN+		at Brown	W 77–70	10–10 (4–3)	Pizzitola Sports Center (689); Providence, RI
February 7, 2026; 5:00 pm, ESPN+		Harvard	L 58–71	10–11 (4–4)	Leede Arena (1,414); Hanover, NH
February 13, 2026; 7:00 pm, ESPN+		Yale	L 70–83	10–12 (4–5)	Leede Arena (1,109); Hanover, NH
February 14, 2026; 6:00 pm, ESPN+		Brown	L 76–79	10–13 (4–6)	Leede Arena (1,176); Hanover, NH
February 21, 2026; 2:00 pm, ESPN+		at Columbia	W 64–63	11–13 (5–6)	Levien Gymnasium (1,538); New York, NY
February 27, 2026; 7:00 pm, ESPN+		at Penn	L 71–80	11–14 (5–7)	The Palestra (1,530); Philadelphia, PA
February 28, 2026; 6:00 pm, ESPN+		at Princeton	L 61–82	11–15 (5–8)	Jadwin Gymnasium (2,041); Princeton, NJ
March 7, 2026; 2:00 pm, ESPN+		Cornell	L 90–111	11–16 (5–9)	Leede Arena (1,210); Hanover, NH
*Non-conference game. ^{#}Rankings from AP Poll. (#) Tournament seedings in parentheses. All times are in Eastern.
