= 2025–26 Princeton Tigers men's basketball team =

American college basketball season

2025–26 Princeton Tigers men's basketball
- Conference: Ivy League
- Record: 9–20 (5–9 Ivy)
- Head coach: Mitch Henderson (14th season)
- Associate head coach: Mike Brennan
- Assistant coaches: Luke Gore; Matthew Johnson
- Home arena: Jadwin Gymnasium

2025–26 Ivy League men's basketball standings
| | Conf. | | | | Overall |
| Team | W | | L | PCT | W | | L | PCT |
|---|---|---|---|---|---|---|---|---|
| Yale | 11 | – | 3 | .786 | 23 | – | 5 | .821 |
| Harvard | 10 | – | 4 | .714 | 17 | – | 11 | .607 |
| Penn | 9 | – | 5 | .643 | 16 | – | 11 | .593 |
| Cornell | 8 | – | 6 | .571 | 15 | – | 12 | .556 |
| Columbia | 5 | – | 9 | .357 | 16 | – | 12 | .571 |
| Dartmouth | 5 | – | 9 | .357 | 11 | – | 16 | .407 |
| Princeton | 5 | – | 9 | .357 | 9 | – | 20 | .310 |
| Brown | 3 | – | 11 | .214 | 9 | – | 18 | .333 |
† 2026 Ivy League tournament winner As of March 7, 2026

The 2025–26 Princeton Tigers men's basketball team represented Princeton University during the 2025–26 NCAA Division I men's basketball season. The Tigers, led by 14th-year head coach Mitch Henderson, played their home games at Jadwin Gymnasium in Princeton, New Jersey as members of the Ivy League.

== Previous season ==
The Tigers finished the 2024–25 season 19–11, 8–6 in Ivy League play, finishing in a tie for third place. In the Ivy League tournament, they were defeated by Yale in the semifinals.

== Roster ==
2025–26 Princeton Tigers men's basketball team
Players
Coaches

| Pos. | # | Name | Height | Weight | Year | Hometown |
|---|---|---|---|---|---|---|
| F | 0 | Will Kutzler | 6 ft 7 in (2.01 m) | 205 lb (93 kg) | Jr | Lakeville, Minnesota |
| G | 2 | Peyton Seals | 6 ft 4 in (1.93 m) | 212 lb (96 kg) | So | Wyckoff, New Jersey |
| F | 4 | CJ Happy | 6 ft 9 in (2.06 m) | 226 lb (103 kg) | So | Sterling, Massachusetts |
| G | 5 | Zio Kim | 6 ft 4 in (1.93 m) | 160 lb (73 kg) | So | Basking Ridge, New Jersey |
| G | 6 | Ryan Mandes | 6 ft 3 in (1.91 m) | 190 lb (86 kg) | Fr | Denver, Colorado |
| F | 7 | Malik Abdullahi | 6 ft 7 in (2.01 m) | 207 lb (94 kg) | So | Miami, Florida |
| G | 8 | Landon Clark | 6 ft 8 in (2.03 m) | 200 lb (91 kg) | Fr | Bangor, Maine |
| G | 11 | Jake Sussberg | 6 ft 5 in (1.96 m) | 195 lb (88 kg) | Fr | Scarsdale, New York |
| F | 12 | Jacob Huggins | 6 ft 8 in (2.03 m) | 225 lb (102 kg) | Jr | Oak Park, California |
| F | 15 | Cash McSweeney | 6 ft 8 in (2.03 m) | 225 lb (102 kg) | Fr | Raleigh, North Carolina |
| G | 21 | Jack Stanton | 6 ft 2 in (1.88 m) | 184 lb (83 kg) | So | Downers Grove, Illinois |
| G | 22 | Dalen Davis | 6 ft 0 in (1.83 m) | 190 lb (86 kg) | Jr | Chicago, Illinois |
| G/F | 23 | Sebastian Whitfield | 6 ft 6 in (1.98 m) | 205 lb (93 kg) | Fr | Virginia Beach, Virginia |
| F | 24 | Jacob Hammond | 6 ft 6 in (1.98 m) | 220 lb (100 kg) | Fr | Whitby, Ontario |
| G | 33 | Jackson Hicke | 6 ft 5 in (1.96 m) | 200 lb (91 kg) | Jr | Radnor, Pennsylvania |
| G | 66 | Cooper Mueller | 6 ft 3 in (1.91 m) | 180 lb (82 kg) | Jr | Villanova, Pennsylvania |

Head coach

- Mitch Henderson (Princeton)

Assistant coach(es)

- Mike Brennan (Princeton)
- Luke Gore (Bethel (IN))
- Matthew Johnson (Tampa)

Legend

- (C) Team captain
- (S) Suspended
- (I) Ineligible
- (W) Walk-on
- Injured
- Current redshirt

Roster
Last update: October 19, 2025

== Schedule and results ==
| Date time, TV | Rank^{#} | Opponent^{#} | Result | Record | Site (attendance) city, state |
Non-conference regular season
| November 8, 2025*; 1:00 pm, ESPN+ | | at Akron | L 69–104 | 0–1 | James A. Rhodes Arena (1,502); Akron, OH |
| November 11, 2025*; 7:00 pm, ESPN+ | | Bucknell | W 73–63 | 1–1 | Jadwin Gymnasium (1,134); Princeton, NJ |
| November 13, 2025*; 7:00 pm, ESPN+ | | John Jay | W 100–59 | 2–1 | Jadwin Gymnasium (896); Princeton, NJ |
| November 15, 2025*; 2:00 pm, ESPN+ | | at No. 25 Kansas | L 57–76 | 2–2 | Allen Fieldhouse (15,300); Lawrence, KS |
| November 18, 2025*; 7:00 pm, ESPN+ | | at Iona | L 69–89 | 2–3 | Hynes Athletics Center (1,692); New Rochelle, NY |
| November 20, 2025*; 7:00 pm, ESPN+ | | Northeastern | W 70−57 | 3−3 | Jadwin Gymnasium; Princeton, NJ |
| November 24, 2025*; 7:00 pm, ESPNU | | vs. Bradley; ESPN Events Invitational; Adventure Bracket quarterfinals | L 64–88 | 3–4 | State Farm Field House (1,076); Bay Lake, FL |
| November 25, 2025*; 7:45 p.m., ESPNU | | vs. Temple; ESPN Events Invitational; Adventure Bracket consolation semifinals | L 75–79 | 3–5 | State Farm Field House; Bay Lake, FL |
| November 26, 2025*; 7:30 p.m., ESPN+ | | vs. Vermont; ESPN Events Invitational; Adventure Bracket 7th place game | L 74–79 | 3–6 | State Farm Field House; Bay Lake, FL |
| November 30, 2025*; 1:00 pm, BallerTV | | vs. Saint Joseph's; Jersey Jam | L 58–60 | 3–7 | CURE Insurance Arena (1,386); Trenton, NJ |
| December 3, 2025*; 8:00 pm, FloCollege | | at Monmouth | L 58–63 | 3–8 | OceanFirst Bank Center (1,517); West Long Branch, NJ |
| December 6, 2025*; 1:30 pm, USA | | at Loyola Chicago | L 68–73 | 3–9 | Joseph J. Gentile Arena (2,699); Chicago, IL |
| December 10, 2025*; 5:00 pm, ESPN+ | | Merrimack | L 56−59 | 3−10 | Jadwin Gymnasium (1,048); Princeton, NJ |
| December 22, 2025*; 7:00 pm, ESPN+ | | at Temple | L 61–65 | 3–11 | Liacouras Center (2,924); Philadelphia, PA |
| December 30, 2025*; 1:00 pm, ESPN+ | | Vermont | W 75–69 ^{OT} | 4–11 | Jadwin Gymnasium (2,816); Princeton, NJ |
Ivy League regular season
| January 5, 2026; 7:00 pm, ESPN+ | | Penn; Rivalry | W 78–76 | 5–11 (1–0) | Jadwin Gymnasium (2,438); Princeton, NJ |
| January 10, 2026; 2:00 pm, ESPN+ | | Yale | W 76–60 | 6–11 (2–0) | Jadwin Gymnasium (4,884); Princeton, NJ |
| January 17, 2026; 2:00 pm, ESPN+ | | at Harvard | L 80–87 | 6–12 (2–1) | Lavietes Pavilion (1,636); Boston, MA |
| January 19, 2026; 6:00 pm, ESPN+ | | at Dartmouth | L 69–71 | 6–13 (2–2) | Leede Arena (915); Hanover, NH |
| January 24, 2026; 12:00 pm, ESPN+ | | Brown | W 63–53 | 7–13 (3–2) | Jadwin Gymnasium (3,314); Princeton, NJ |
| January 30, 2026; 6:00 pm, ESPN+ | | at Cornell | L 64–87 | 7–14 (3–3) | Newman Arena (922); Ithaca, NY |
| January 31, 2026; 6:00 pm, ESPN+ | | at Columbia | W 80–68 | 8–14 (4–3) | Levien Gymnasium (1,826); New York, NY |
| February 7, 2026; 2:00 pm, ESPNU | | at Penn; Rivalry | L 60–61 | 8–15 (4–4) | The Palestra (3,887); Philadelphia, PA |
| February 13, 2026; 7:00 pm, ESPN+ | | Cornell | L 65–89 | 8–16 (4–5) | Jadwin Gymnasium (1,630); Princeton, NJ |
| February 14, 2026; 6:00 pm, ESPN+ | | Columbia | L 65–75 | 8–17 (4–6) | Jadwin Gymnasium (2,769); Princeton, NJ |
| February 20, 2026; 7:00 pm, ESPN+ | | at Brown | L 71–80 | 8–18 (4–7) | Pizzitola Sports Center (643); Providence, RI |
| February 27, 2026; 7:00 pm, ESPN+ | | Harvard | L 56–58 | 8–19 (4–8) | Jadwin Gymnasium (2,417); Princeton, NJ |
| February 28, 2026; 6:00 pm, ESPN+ | | Dartmouth | W 82–61 | 9–19 (5–8) | Jadwin Gymnasium (2,041); Princeton, NJ |
| March 7, 2026; 2:00 pm, ESPN+ | | at Yale | L 53–78 | 9–20 (5–9) | John J. Lee Amphitheater (1,920); New Haven, CT |
*Non-conference game. ^{#}Rankings from AP Poll. (#) Tournament seedings in parentheses. All times are in Eastern.
