= 2025–26 Penn Quakers men's basketball team =

American college basketball season

2025–26 Penn Quakers men's basketball

Ivy League tournament champions

NCAA tournament, First round
- Conference: Ivy League
- Record: 18–12 (9–5 Ivy)
- Head coach: Fran McCaffery (1st season)
- Assistant coaches: Tristan Spurlock; Ben Luber; Ronald Moore
- Home arena: The Palestra

2025–26 Ivy League men's basketball standings
	Conf.				Overall
Team	W		L	PCT	W		L	PCT
Yale	11	–	3	.786	24	–	7	.774
Harvard	10	–	4	.714	17	–	12	.586
Penn †	9	–	5	.643	18	–	12	.600
Cornell	8	–	6	.571	15	–	13	.536
Columbia	5	–	9	.357	16	–	12	.571
Dartmouth	5	–	9	.357	11	–	16	.407
Princeton	5	–	9	.357	9	–	20	.310
Brown	3	–	11	.214	9	–	18	.333
† 2026 Ivy League tournament winner

The 2025–26 Penn Quakers men's basketball team represented the University of Pennsylvania during the 2025–26 NCAA Division I men's basketball season. The Quakers, led by first-year head coach Fran McCaffery, played their home games at The Palestra in Philadelphia, Pennsylvania as members of the Ivy League.

== Previous season ==
The Quakers finished the 2024–25 season 8–19, 4–10 in Ivy League play to finish in seventh place. They failed to qualify for the Ivy League tournament.

On March 10, 2025, the school fired head coach Steve Donahue. On March 27, the school named former Iowa head coach and Penn alum Fran McCaffery as the team's new head coach.

== Roster ==
2025–26 Penn Quakers men's basketball team
Players
Coaches

Pos.	#	Name	Height	Weight	Year	Hometown
G	0	AJ Levine	6 ft 0 in (1.83 m)	185 lb (84 kg)	So	Elmhurst, Illinois
G	2	Dylan Williams	5 ft 11 in (1.8 m)	180 lb (82 kg)	Sr	Columbia, South Carolina
F	3	Johnnie Walter	6 ft 10 in (2.08 m)	230 lb (104 kg)	Sr	Agoura Hills, California
G	4	Jay Jones	6 ft 4 in (1.93 m)	195 lb (88 kg)	Fr	Chestnut Hill, Massachusetts
G	5	Cam Thrower	6 ft 3 in (1.91 m)	195 lb (88 kg)	Sr	Manhattan Beach, California
G/F	7	Michael Zanoni	6 ft 5 in (1.96 m)	200 lb (91 kg)	Sr	Charlotte, North Carolina
G/F	10	Ryan Altman	6 ft 6 in (1.98 m)	200 lb (91 kg)	Fr	Chestnut Hill, Massachusetts
G	11	Alex Massung	6 ft 4 in (1.93 m)	195 lb (88 kg)	So	West Orange, New Jersey
F	12	TJ Power	6 ft 9 in (2.06 m)	220 lb (100 kg)	Jr	Shrewsbury, Massachusetts
F/C	13	Dalton Scantlebury	6 ft 9 in (2.06 m)	250 lb (113 kg)	Fr	Chicago, Illinois
F	15	Bradyn Foster	6 ft 8 in (2.03 m)	220 lb (100 kg)	So	Natrona Heights, Pennsylvania
G	21	Payton Kamin	6 ft 7 in (2.01 m)	210 lb (95 kg)	Fr	Chicago, Illinois
G/F	23	Ethan Roberts	6 ft 5 in (1.96 m)	190 lb (86 kg)	Sr	Arlington Heights, Illinois
F	25	Augustus Gerhart	6 ft 9 in (2.06 m)	235 lb (107 kg)	Jr	Denver, Pennsylvania
F	30	Lucas Lueth	6 ft 7 in (2.01 m)	210 lb (95 kg)	So	Ames, Iowa
C	33	Michelangelo Oberti	6 ft 10 in (2.08 m)	240 lb (109 kg)	So	Riva di Solto, Italy
C	34	Chris Ubochi	6 ft 9 in (2.06 m)	230 lb (104 kg)	Sr	Lagos, Nigeria
G/F	35	Niklas Polonowski	6 ft 6 in (1.98 m)	210 lb (95 kg)	Jr	La Grange, Illinois
F	40	William Kruse	6 ft 11 in (2.11 m)	240 lb (109 kg)	Fr	Nesbru, Norway

Head coach

- Fran McCaffery (Penn)

Assistant coach(es)

- Tristan Spurlock (Central Florida)
- Ben Luber (Penn State)
- Ronald Moore (Siena)

Legend

- (C) Team captain
- (S) Suspended
- (I) Ineligible
- (W) Walk-on
- Injured
- Current redshirt

Roster
Last update: November 5, 2024

== Schedule and results ==
Date time, TV	Rank^{#}	Opponent^{#}	Result	Record	Site (attendance) city, state
Non-conference regular season
November 7, 2025*; 7:00 p.m., ESPN+		Rowan	W 119–72	1–0	The Palestra (1,568); Philadelphia, PA
November 9, 2025*; 1:00 p.m., ESPN+		at American	L 78–84	1–1	Bender Arena (1,621); Washington, D.C.
November 11, 2025*; 7:00 p.m., ESPN+		at Providence	L 81–106	1–2	Amica Mutual Pavilion (9,472); Providence, RI
November 17, 2025*; 7:00 p.m., ESPN+/NBCSPHI		Saint Joseph's; Big 5 Classic Pod 2	W 83–74	2–2	The Palestra (2,387); Philadelphia, PA
November 21, 2025*; 7:00 p.m., FloCollege/NBCSPHI		at Drexel; Big 5 Classic Pod 2, Battle of 33rd Street	W 84–68	3–2	Daskalakis Athletic Center (1,984); Philadelphia, PA
November 28, 2025*; 4:30 p.m., ESPN+		Merrimack; Cathedral Classic	W 77–65	4–2	The Palestra (1,440); Philadelphia, PA
November 29, 2025*; 4:30 p.m., ESPN+		La Salle; Cathedral Classic	W 73–71	5–2	The Palestra (1,989); Philadelphia, PA
November 30, 2025*; 2:30 p.m., ESPN+		Hofstra; Cathedral Classic	L 60−77	5−3	The Palestra (973); Philadelphia, PA
December 6, 2025*; 7:00 p.m., Peacock/NBCSPHI		vs. Villanova; Big 5 Classic Championship	L 63–90	5–4	Xfinity Mobile Arena (10,361); Philadelphia, PA
December 8, 2025*; 6:00 p.m., ESPN+		Lafayette	W 74–72	6–4	The Palestra (934); Philadelphia, PA
December 20, 2025*; 8:00 p.m., BTN		at Rutgers	L 69–70	6–5	Jersey Mike's Arena (8,000); Piscataway, NJ
December 28, 2025*; 5:00 p.m., ESPN+		at George Mason	L 79–83	6–6	EagleBank Arena (3,860); Fairfax, VA
December 31, 2025*; 2:00 p.m., ESPN+		NJIT	W 80–61	7–6	The Palestra (1,125); Philadelphia, PA
Ivy League regular season
January 5, 2026; 7:00 p.m., ESPN+		at Princeton; Rivalry	L 76–78	7–7 (0–1)	Jadwin Gymnasium (2,438); Princeton, NJ
January 10, 2026; 2:00 p.m., ESPN+		Brown	W 81–73	8–7 (1–1)	The Palestra (1,325); Philadelphia, PA
January 17, 2026; 3:00 p.m., ESPN+		at Dartmouth	W 84–74	9–7 (2–1)	Leede Arena; Hanover, NH
January 19, 2026; 2:00 p.m., ESPN+		at Harvard	L 63–64	9–8 (2–2)	Lavietes Pavilion (1,299); Boston, MA
January 24, 2026; 2:00 p.m., ESPN+		Yale	L 60–77	9–9 (2–3)	The Palestra (2,806); Philadelphia, PA
January 30, 2026; 7:00 p.m., ESPN+		at Columbia	L 67–72	9–10 (2–4)	Levien Gymnasium (1,918); New York, NY
January 31, 2026; 6:00 p.m., ESPN+		at Cornell	W 91–81	10–10 (3–4)	Newman Arena (1,202); Ithaca, NY
February 7, 2026; 2:00 p.m., ESPNU		Princeton; Rivalry	W 61–60	11–10 (4–4)	The Palestra (3,887); Philadelphia, PA
February 13, 2026; 7:00 p.m., ESPN+		Columbia	W 76–67	12–10 (5–4)	The Palestra (1,365); Philadelphia, PA
February 14, 2026; 6:00 p.m., ESPN+		Cornell	W 82–76	13–10 (6–4)	The Palestra (1,837); Philadelphia, PA
February 21, 2026; 2:00 p.m., ESPN+		at Yale	L 70–74	13–11 (6–5)	John J. Lee Amphitheater (2,285); New Haven, CT
February 27, 2026; 7:00 p.m., ESPN+		Dartmouth	W 80–71	14–11 (7–5)	The Palestra (1,530); Philadelphia, PA
February 28, 2026; 6:00 p.m., ESPN+		Harvard	W 64–61	15–11 (8–5)	The Palestra (2,877); Philadelphia, PA
March 6, 2026; 2:00 p.m., ESPN+		at Brown	W 82–61	16–11 (9–5)	Pizzitola Sports Center (707); Providence, RI
Ivy League Tournament
March 14, 2026; 2:00 p.m., ESPNews	(3)	vs. (2) Harvard; Semifinal	W 62–60 ^{OT}	17–11	Newman Arena (2,277); Ithaca, NY
March 15, 2026; 12:00 p.m., ESPN2	(3)	vs. (1) Yale; Championship	W 88–84 ^{OT}	18–11	Newman Arena (1,466); Ithaca, NY
NCAA Tournament
March 19, 2026; 9:25 p.m., TNT	(14 S)	vs. (3 S) No. 13 Illinois; First round	L 70–105	18–12	Bon Secours Wellness Arena (14,092); Greenville, SC
*Non-conference game. ^{#}Rankings from AP Poll. (#) Tournament seedings in parentheses. S=South. All times are in Eastern.
