= 2025–26 Harvard Crimson men's basketball team =

American college basketball season

2025–26 Harvard Crimson men's basketball
- Conference: Ivy League
- Record: 17–12 (10–4 Ivy)
- Head coach: Tommy Amaker (18th season)
- Assistant coaches: Mike Sotsky; Seth Towns; Matt Fraschilla
- Home arena: Lavietes Pavilion

2025–26 Ivy League men's basketball standings
| | Conf. | | | | Overall |
| Team | W | | L | PCT | W | | L | PCT |
|---|---|---|---|---|---|---|---|---|
| Yale | 11 | – | 3 | .786 | 24 | – | 6 | .800 |
| Harvard | 10 | – | 4 | .714 | 17 | – | 12 | .586 |
| Penn † | 9 | – | 5 | .643 | 18 | – | 11 | .621 |
| Cornell | 8 | – | 6 | .571 | 15 | – | 13 | .536 |
| Columbia | 5 | – | 9 | .357 | 16 | – | 12 | .571 |
| Dartmouth | 5 | – | 9 | .357 | 11 | – | 16 | .407 |
| Princeton | 5 | – | 9 | .357 | 9 | – | 20 | .310 |
| Brown | 3 | – | 11 | .214 | 9 | – | 18 | .333 |
† 2026 Ivy League tournament winner As of March 15, 2026

The 2025–26 Harvard Crimson men's basketball team represented Harvard University during the 2025–26 NCAA Division I men's basketball season. The Crimson, led by 18th-year head coach Tommy Amaker, played their home games at the Lavietes Pavilion located in Boston, Massachusetts as members of the Ivy League.

== Previous season ==
The Crimson finished the 2024–25 season 12–15, 7–7 in Ivy League play to place fifth. They failed to qualify for the Ivy League tournament.

== Roster ==
2025–26 Harvard Crimson men's basketball team
Players
Coaches

| Pos. | # | Name | Height | Weight | Year | Hometown |
|---|---|---|---|---|---|---|
| F | 0 | Kenan Parrish | 7 ft 0 in (2.13 m) | 260 lb (118 kg) | Fr | Pittsboro, NC |
| G | 3 | Xavier Nesbitt | 5 ft 11 in (1.8 m) | 175 lb (79 kg) | Jr | Chicago, IL |
| G | 4 | Robert Hinton | 6 ft 5 in (1.96 m) | 200 lb (91 kg) | So | Los Angeles, CA |
| G | 5 | Ben Eisendrath | 6 ft 2 in (1.88 m) | 180 lb (82 kg) | So | Los Angeles, CA |
| G | 7 | Austin Hunt | 6 ft 4 in (1.93 m) | 190 lb (86 kg) | So | Marlborough, MA |
| G | 8 | Tey Barbour | 6 ft 4 in (1.93 m) | 190 lb (86 kg) | So | Manassas, VA |
| G | 10 | Frankie Mannino | 6 ft 5 in (1.96 m) | 205 lb (93 kg) | Fr | Leesburg, VA |
| F | 11 | Alex Touomou | 6 ft 7 in (2.01 m) | 215 lb (98 kg) | Fr | Falls Church, VA |
| G | 12 | Dutch Dowdell | 6 ft 6 in (1.98 m) | 195 lb (88 kg) | So | Holladay, UT |
| G | 13 | Chandler Piggé | 6 ft 5 in (1.96 m) | 210 lb (95 kg) | Sr | Houston, TX |
| G | 14 | Greg Cooper | 6 ft 0 in (1.83 m) | 175 lb (79 kg) | Sr | Cambridge, MA |
| F | 15 | Thomas Batties II | 6 ft 7 in (2.01 m) | 225 lb (102 kg) | Jr | Washington, D.C. |
| G | 18 | Joseph Quartey | 6 ft 2 in (1.88 m) | 165 lb (75 kg) | Fr | Cape Coast, Ghana |
| G | 24 | Payton Pitts | 6 ft 2 in (1.88 m) | 180 lb (82 kg) | Jr | Chicago, IL |
| F | 34 | Ryan Sullivan | 6 ft 9 in (2.06 m) | 205 lb (93 kg) | Fr | Auburn, MA |
| F | 35 | Luca Ace-Nasteski | 6 ft 10 in (2.08 m) | 235 lb (107 kg) | Jr | Manly, Australia |
| F | 41 | Avner Dror | 6 ft 9 in (2.06 m) | 225 lb (102 kg) | Fr | Kfar Hess, Israel |

Head coach

- Tommy Amaker (Duke)

Assistant coach(es)

- Mike Sotsky (Harvard)
- Seth Towns (Harvard)
- Matt Fraschilla (Harvard)

Legend

- (C) Team captain
- (S) Suspended
- (I) Ineligible
- (W) Walk-on
- Injured
- Current redshirt

Roster
Last update: October 21, 2025

== Schedule and results ==
| Date time, TV | Rank^{#} | Opponent^{#} | Result | Record | Site (attendance) city, state |
Exhibition
| October 25, 2025*; 4:00 p.m. | | at Providence | L 77–85 | – | Amica Mutual Pavilion (2,875); Providence, RI |
| October 30, 2025*; 7:00 p.m., ESPN+ | | UMass Boston | W 107–58 | – | Lavietes Pavilion (531); Boston, MA |
Non-conference regular season
| November 7, 2025*; 5:00 p.m., ESPN+ | | MIT | W 79–50 | 1–0 | Lavietes Pavilion (1,265); Boston, MA |
| November 9, 2025*; 12:00 p.m., ESPN+ | | New Hampshire | W 86–75 | 2–0 | Lavietes Pavilion (784); Boston, MA |
| November 11, 2025*; 7:00 p.m., ESPN+ | | Northeastern | L 60–77 | 2–1 | Lavietes Pavilion (901); Boston, MA |
| November 15, 2025*; 2:00 p.m., ESPN+ | | at Army | W 75–52 | 3–1 | Christl Arena (911); West Point, NY |
| November 16, 2025*; 5:00 p.m., ESPN+ | | at Marist | W 56–54 | 4–1 | McCann Arena (1,884); Poughkeepsie, NY |
| November 19, 2025*; 6:30 p.m., B1G+ | | at Penn State | L 80–84 | 4–2 | Bryce Jordan Center (5,708); State College, PA |
| November 22, 2025*; 1:30 p.m | | vs. Boston University; Hall of Fame Showcase | L 74–75 | 4–3 | Mohegan Sun Arena (6,456); Uncasville, CT |
| November 26, 2025*; 4:00 p.m., ACCNX/ESPN+ | | at Boston College | L 60–73 | 4–4 | Conte Forum (4,439); Chestnut Hill, MA |
| November 29, 2025*; 2:00 p.m., ESPN+ | | Bryant | W 56–53 | 5–4 | Lavietes Pavilion (1,022); Boston, MA |
| December 3, 2025*; 7:00 p.m., ESPN+ | | at UMass | L 71–78 | 5–5 | Mullins Center (2,216); Amherst, MA |
| December 6, 2025*; 2:00 p.m., ESPN+ | | at Furman | L 69–79 | 5–6 | Timmons Arena (2,187); Greenville, SC |
| December 20, 2025*; 2:00 p.m., ESPN+/NESN | | Holy Cross | W 81–53 | 6–6 | Lavietes Pavilion (1,155); Boston, MA |
| December 23, 2025*; 6:00 p.m., FS1 | | at St. John's | L 59–85 | 6–7 | Carnesecca Arena (5,260); Queens, NY |
| December 28, 2025*; 2:00 p.m., ESPN+ | | at Colgate | W 78–69 | 7–7 | Cotterell Court (781); Hamilton, NY |
Ivy League regular season
| January 5, 2026; 7:00 p.m., ESPN+ | | Dartmouth | L 68–76 | 7–8 (0–1) | Lavietes Pavilion (824); Boston, MA |
| January 10, 2026; 2:00 p.m., ESPN+ | | at Columbia | W 79–54 | 8–8 (1–1) | Levien Gymnasium (1,634); New York, NY |
| January 17, 2026; 2:00 p.m., ESPN+ | | Princeton | W 87–80 | 9–8 (2–1) | Lavietes Pavilion (1,636); Boston, MA |
| January 19, 2026; 2:00 p.m., ESPN+ | | Penn | W 64–63 | 10–8 (3–1) | Lavietes Pavilion (1,299); Boston, MA |
| January 24, 2026; 2:00 p.m., ESPN+ | | Cornell | L 79–86 | 10–9 (3–2) | Lavietes Pavilion (1,636); Boston, MA |
| January 30, 2026; 7:00 p.m., ESPN+ | | at Brown | W 69–59 | 11–9 (4–2) | Pizzitola Sports Center; Providence, RI |
| January 31, 2026; 7:00 p.m., ESPN+ | | at Yale | W 67–65 | 12–9 (5–2) | John J. Lee Amphitheater (2,425); New Haven, CT |
| February 7, 2026; 5:00 p.m., ESPN+ | | at Dartmouth | W 71–58 | 13–9 (6–2) | Leede Arena (1,414); Hanover, NH |
| February 13, 2026; 7:00 p.m., ESPN+ | | Brown | W 56–53 | 14–9 (7–2) | Lavietes Pavilion (1,194); Boston, MA |
| February 14, 2026; 6:30 p.m., ESPNU | | Yale | L 75–76 ^{OT} | 14–10 (7–3) | Lavietes Pavilion (1,636); Boston, MA |
| February 21, 2026; 2:00 p.m., ESPN+ | | at Cornell | W 73–54 | 15–10 (8–3) | Newman Arena (1,844); Ithaca, NY |
| February 27, 2026; 7:00 p.m., ESPN+ | | at Princeton | W 58–56 | 16–10 (9–3) | Jadwin Gymnasium (2,417); Princeton, NJ |
| February 28, 2026; 6:00 p.m., ESPN+ | | at Penn | L 61–64 | 16–11 (9–4) | The Palestra (2,877); Philadelphia, PA |
| March 6, 2026; 7:00 p.m., ESPN+ | | Columbia | W 81–71 | 17–11 (10–4) | Lavietes Pavilion (1,636); Boston, MA |
Ivy League Tournament
| March 14, 2026; 2:00 p.m., ESPNews | (2) | vs. (3) Penn; Semifinals | L 60–62 ^{OT} | 17–12 | Newman Arena; Ithaca, NY |
*Non-conference game. ^{#}Rankings from AP Poll. (#) Tournament seedings in parentheses. All times are in Eastern.
