= 2025–26 Brown Bears men's basketball team =

American college basketball season

2025–26 Brown Bears men's basketball
- Conference: Ivy League
- Record: 9–18 (3–11 Ivy)
- Head coach: Mike Martin (13th season)
- Associate head coach: Tyson Wheeler
- Assistant coaches: Omar Lowery; DeVon Price
- Home arena: Pizzitola Sports Center

2025–26 Ivy League men's basketball standings
	Conf.				Overall
Team	W		L	PCT	W		L	PCT
Yale	11	–	3	.786	24	–	7	.774
Harvard	10	–	4	.714	17	–	12	.586
Penn †	9	–	5	.643	18	–	12	.600
Cornell	8	–	6	.571	15	–	13	.536
Columbia	5	–	9	.357	16	–	12	.571
Dartmouth	5	–	9	.357	11	–	16	.407
Princeton	5	–	9	.357	9	–	20	.310
Brown	3	–	11	.214	9	–	18	.333
† 2026 Ivy League tournament winner

The 2025–26 Brown Bears men's basketball team represented Brown University during the 2025–26 NCAA Division I men's basketball season. The Bears, led by 13th-year head coach Mike Martin, played their home games at the Pizzitola Sports Center located in Providence, Rhode Island, as members of the Ivy League. They finished the season 9–18, 3–11 in Ivy League play to finish in last place.

Following the hiring of Mike Boynton as the new Michigan coach, head coach Mike Martin left the school to join the Wolverine staff as an assistant coach.

== Previous season ==
The Bears finished the 2024–25 season 14–13, 6–8 in Ivy League play, finishing in sixth place. They failed to qualify for the Ivy League tournament.

== Roster ==
2025–26 Brown Bears men's basketball team
Players
Coaches

Pos.	#	Name	Height	Weight	Year	Hometown
G	1	Isaiah Langham	6 ft 5 in (1.96 m)	210 lb (95 kg)	Fr	Stoughton, MA
G	2	Jeremiah Jenkins	6 ft 0 in (1.83 m)	155 lb (70 kg)	So	New Britain, CT
G	3	Alexander Lesburt Jr.	6 ft 5 in (1.96 m)	197 lb (89 kg)	Sr	Derry, NH
G	4	Jonah Drezner	6 ft 3 in (1.91 m)	170 lb (77 kg)	Fr	Seattle, WA
G	5	Adrian Uchidiuno	6 ft 2 in (1.88 m)	170 lb (77 kg)	Jr	Markham, ON
F	6	Wyatt DeGraaf	6 ft 10 in (2.08 m)	240 lb (109 kg)	So	Durham, NC
G	11	Jerrell Barron Jr.	6 ft 4 in (1.93 m)	175 lb (79 kg)	So	Atascocita, TX
G	12	Malcolm Wrisby-Jefferson	6 ft 4 in (1.93 m)	195 lb (88 kg)	Jr	Queens, NY
G	14	Luke Paragon	6 ft 4 in (1.93 m)	195 lb (88 kg)	Jr	Cicero, NY
G/F	23	David Rochester	6 ft 8 in (2.03 m)	215 lb (98 kg)	So	Great Falls, VA
G	30	Brady Loughlin	6 ft 5 in (1.96 m)	200 lb (91 kg)	Fr	Wyckoff, NJ
F	32	Drew Kania	6 ft 8 in (2.03 m)	230 lb (104 kg)	Sr	Chatham, NJ
F	33	Charlie O'Sullivan	6 ft 10 in (2.08 m)	230 lb (104 kg)	Fr	Harrison, NY
F	40	Landon Lewis	6 ft 7 in (2.01 m)	225 lb (102 kg)	Sr	Los Angeles, CA
F	45	N'famara Dabo	6 ft 8 in (2.03 m)	235 lb (107 kg)	Jr	Conakry, Guinea

Head coach

- Mike Martin (Brown)

Assistant coach(es)

- Tyson Wheeler (Fairfield)
- Omar Lowery (Concordia)
- DeVon Price (Rio Grande)

Legend

- (C) Team captain
- (S) Suspended
- (I) Ineligible
- (W) Walk-on
- Injured
- Current redshirt

Roster
Last update: October 25, 2025

== Schedule and results ==
Date time, TV	Rank^{#}	Opponent^{#}	Result	Record	High points	High rebounds	High assists	Site (attendance) city, state
Exhibition
October 19, 2025*; 4:00 pm		UMass	L 74–92	–	16 – Uchidiuno	8 – Dabo	7 – Jenkins	Pizzitola Sports Center (484); Providence, RI
Non-conference regular season
November 7, 2025*; 7:00 pm, ESPN+		Siena	L 46–62	0–1	11 – Uchidiuno	7 – Dabo	5 – Jenkins	Pizzitola Sports Center (564); Providence, RI
November 9, 2025*; 2:00 pm, ESPN+		Vermont	L 84−89 ^{2OT}	0−2	16 – Tied	12 – Dabo	10 – Jenkins	Pizzitola Sports Center (764); Providence, RI
November 12, 2025*; 7:00 pm, ESPN+		at Boston University	L 77−90	0−3	18 – Langham	4 – Jenkins	6 – Jenkins	Case Gym (1,455); Boston, MA
November 14, 2025*; 8:15 pm, ESPN+		Hampton; College Hill Classic	L 63–72	0–4	21 – Jenkins	7 – Dabo	4 – Jenkins	Pizzitola Sports Center (407); Providence, RI
November 18, 2025*; 7:00 pm, ESPN+		Holy Cross; College Hill Classic	W 68–49	1–4	18 – Langham	12 – Dabo	6 – Jenkins	Pizzitola Sports Center (407); Providence, RI
November 20, 2025*; 6:30 pm, FloCollege		at Stony Brook	L 70–80	1–5	14 – Uchidiuno	7 – Uchidiuno	7 – Jenkins	Stony Brook Arena (1,243); Stony Brook, NY
November 23, 2025*; 12:00 pm, ESPN+		at Maine	W 58–53	2–5	13 – Lewis	8 – Dabo	2 – Tied	Memorial Gymnasium (1,157); Orono, ME
November 26, 2025*; 1:00 pm, ESPN+		at New Hampshire	W 59–47	3–5	17 – Tied	8 – Dabo	3 – Tied	Lundholm Gym (302); Durham, NH
December 2, 2025*; 7:00 pm, ESPN+		at Rhode Island	L 56–66	3–6	12 – Tied	7 – Rochester	4 – Wrisby-Jefferson	Ryan Center (3,575); Kingston, RI
December 5, 2025*; 7:00 pm, ESPN+		Bryant	W 75–56	4–6	13 – Uchidiuno	11 – Dabo	6 – Jenkins	Pizzitola Sports Center (610); Providence, RI
December 6, 2025*; 5:00 pm, ESPN+		Elms	W 115–34	5–6	19 – O'Sullivan	10 – O'Sullivan	5 – Tied	Pizzitola Sports Center (211); Providence, RI
December 9, 2025*; 7:30 pm, TruTV		at Providence	L 79–86	5–7	17 – Lewis	8 – Lewis	8 – Jenkins	Amica Mutual Pavilion (8,123); Providence, RI
December 21, 2025*; 4:00 pm, BTN		at USC	Canceled due to 2025 Brown University shooting					Galen Center; Los Angeles, California
December 31, 2025*; 12:00 pm, ESPN+		Johnson & Wales	W 105–47	6–7	19 – Lewis	10 – Jenkins	6 – Jenkins	Pizzitola Sports Center (415); Providence, RI
Ivy League regular season
January 5, 2026; 7:00 pm, NESN		Yale	L 53–70	6–8 (0–1)	16 – Lewis	8 – Lewis	10 – Jenkins	Pizzitola Sports Center (413); Providence, RI
January 10, 2026; 2:00 pm, ESPN+		at Penn	L 73–81	6–9 (0–2)	17 – Dabo	7 – Dabo	6 – Jenkins	The Palestra (1,325); Philadelphia, PA
January 17, 2026; 2:00 pm, NESN		Columbia	W 86–80 ^{OT}	7–9 (1–2)	26 – Lewis	9 – Tied	9 – Jenkins	Pizzitola Sports Center (479); Providence, RI
January 19, 2026; 2:00 pm, ESPN+		Cornell	L 67–89	7–10 (1–3)	17 – Jenkins	8 – Lewis	3 – Tied	Pizzitola Sports Center (476); Providence, RI
January 24, 2026; 7:00 pm, ESPN+		at Princeton	L 53–63	7–11 (1–4)	13 – Lewis	9 – Lewis	6 – Jenkins	Jadwin Gymnasium (3,314); Princeton, NJ
January 30, 2026; 7:00 pm, ESPN+		Harvard	L 59–69	7–12 (1–5)	30 – Lewis	8 – Lewis	5 – Jenkins	Pizzitola Sports Center; Providence, RI
January 31, 2026; 6:00 pm, ESPN+		Dartmouth	L 70–77	7–13 (1–6)	21 – Lewis	14 – Lewis	6 – Jenkins	Pizzitola Sports Center (689); Providence, RI
February 6, 2026; 7:00 pm, ESPN+		at Yale	L 69–81	7–14 (1–7)	15 – Paragon	5 – Wrisby-Jefferson	4 – Wrisby-Jefferson	John J. Lee Amphitheater (1,101); New Haven, CT
February 13, 2026; 7:00 pm, ESPN+		at Harvard	L 53–56	7–15 (1–8)	17 – Lewis	7 – Dabo	4 – Lewis	Lavietes Pavilion (1,194); Boston, MA
February 14, 2026; 6:00 pm, ESPN+		at Dartmouth	W 79–76	8–15 (2–8)	30 – Lewis	10 – Lewis	5 – Jenkins	Leede Arena (1,176); Hanover, NH
February 20, 2026; 7:00 pm, ESPN+		Princeton	W 80–71	9–15 (3–8)	21 – Lewis	4 – Tied	8 – Wrisby-Jefferson	Pizzitola Sports Center (643); Providence, RI
February 27, 2026; 7:00 pm, ESPN+		at Columbia	L 62–80	9–16 (3–9)	18 – Lewis	9 – Lewis	5 – Wrisby-Jefferson	Levien Gymnasium (1,504); New York, NY
February 28, 2026; 5:00 pm, ESPN+		at Cornell	L 80–86	9–17 (3–10)	20 – Lewis	9 – Tied	5 – Jenkins	Newman Arena (1,944); Ithaca, NY
March 6, 2026; 7:00 pm, ESPN+		Penn	L 61–82	9–18 (3–11)	12 – Lewis	11 – Lewis	6 – Jenkins	Pizzitola Sports Center (707); Providence, RI
*Non-conference game. ^{#}Rankings from AP Poll. (#) Tournament seedings in parentheses. All times are in Eastern.
