= TJ Power (basketball) =

American basketball player

No. 12 – Penn Quakers
- Position: Power forward
- League: Ivy League

Personal information
- Listed height: 6 ft 9 in (2.06 m)
- Listed weight: 220 lb (100 kg)

Career information
- High school: Saint John's (Shrewsbury, Massachusetts); Worcester Academy (Worcester, Massachusetts)
- College: Duke (2023–2024); Virginia (2024–2025); Penn (2025–present)

Career highlights
- First-team All-Ivy League (2026); Ivy League tournament MOP (2026)

TJ Power is an American basketball player who plays for the Penn Quakers of the Ivy League. He previously played for the Duke Blue Devils and the Virginia Cavaliers.

== Early life and high school ==
Power grew up in Shrewsbury, Massachusetts and initially attended Saint John's High School before transferring to Worcester Academy. He was named the Massachusetts Gatorade Player of the Year as a junior after averaging 13.1 points, 7.2 rebounds, 2.7 assists, and 1.5 steals per game. Power committed to play college basketball at Duke over offers from North Carolina, Virginia, Iowa, and Notre Dame.

== College career ==
Power began his college basketball career at Duke. As a true freshman he played in 26 games and averaged 2.1 points per game. After the season Power entered the NCAA transfer portal.

Power transferred to Virginia. He averaged 1.3 points per game in his only season with the Cavaliers. Power entered the transfer portal for a second time at the end of his sophomore season.

Power transferred to Penn. He was named first-team All-Ivy League at the end of his first season with the Quakers. Power was also named the Most Outstanding Player of the 2026 Ivy League tournament after scoring 44 points and grabbing 14 rebounds in the championship game over Yale.
