= 2026 Ivy League men's basketball tournament =

American college basketball tournament

- Classification: Division I
- Season: 2025–26
- Teams: 4
- Site: Newman Arena; Ithaca, New York
- Champions: Penn (2nd title)
- Winning coach: Fran McCaffery (1st title)
- MVP: TJ Power (Penn)
- Television: ESPNU, ESPNews, ESPN2

2025–26 Ivy League men's basketball standings
	Conf.				Overall
Team	W		L	PCT	W		L	PCT
Yale	11	–	3	.786	24	–	7	.774
Harvard	10	–	4	.714	17	–	12	.586
Penn †	9	–	5	.643	18	–	12	.600
Cornell	8	–	6	.571	15	–	13	.536
Columbia	5	–	9	.357	16	–	12	.571
Dartmouth	5	–	9	.357	11	–	16	.407
Princeton	5	–	9	.357	9	–	20	.310
Brown	3	–	11	.214	9	–	18	.333
† 2026 Ivy League tournament winner

The 2026 Ivy League Men's Basketball Tournament, popularly referred to as "Ivy Madness", was the postseason men's basketball tournament for the Ivy League of the 2025–26 NCAA Division I men's basketball season. It was held March 14–15, 2026, at Newman Arena on the campus of Cornell University in Ithaca, New York. The winner, Penn, received the Ivy League's automatic bid to the 2026 NCAA Tournament.

== Seeds ==
The top four teams in the Ivy League regular-season standings qualified for the tournament and were seeded according to their records in conference play, resulting in a Shaughnessy playoff.

Seed	School	Record	Tiebreaker 1	Tiebreaker 2
1	Yale	11–3		
2	Harvard	10–4		
3	Penn	9–5		
4	Cornell	8–6		
DNQ	Princeton	5–9	1–1 vs. Yale	
DNQ	Dartmouth	5–9	0–2 vs. Yale	1–1 vs. Harvard
DNQ	Columbia	5–9	0–2 vs. Yale	0–2 vs. Harvard
DNQ	Brown	3–11		

== Schedule ==
Session	Game	Time	Matchup	Score	Television	Attendance
Semifinals – Saturday, March 14
1	1	11:00 a.m.	No. 1 Yale vs. No. 4 Cornell	88–76	ESPNU	2,277
1	2	2:00 p.m.	No. 2 Harvard vs. No. 3 Penn	60–62^{OT}	ESPNews	2,277
Championship – Sunday, March 15
2	3	12:00 p.m.	No. 1 Yale vs. No. 3 Penn	84–88^{OT}	ESPN2	1,466
Game times in Eastern Time. Rankings denote tournament seeding.

== Bracket ==
Semifinals; Saturday, March 14; ESPNU; ESPNews
1	Yale	88
4	Cornell	76
2	Harvard	60
3	Penn	62*

Championship; Sunday, March 15; ESPN2
1	Yale	84
3	Penn	88*

* denotes overtime period

== Awards and Honors ==
=== All-Tournament Team ===
Player	Team
**TJ Power**	Penn
Cameron Thrower	Penn
Trevor Mullin	Yale
Jake Fiegen	Cornell
Ben Eisendrath	Harvard

MVP in bold

== See also ==
- 2026 Ivy League women's basketball tournament
