= 2025–26 Yale Bulldogs men's basketball team =

American college basketball season

2025–26 Yale Bulldogs men's basketball

Ivy League regular season champions Paradise Jam champions

NIT, First Round
- Conference: Ivy League
- Record: 24–7 (11–3 Ivy)
- Head coach: James Jones (26th season)
- Associate head coach: Matt Kingsley
- Assistant coaches: Brandon Sherrod; Tobe Carberry
- Home arena: John J. Lee Amphitheater

2025–26 Ivy League men's basketball standings
	Conf.				Overall
Team	W		L	PCT	W		L	PCT
Yale	11	–	3	.786	24	–	7	.774
Harvard	10	–	4	.714	17	–	12	.586
Penn †	9	–	5	.643	18	–	12	.600
Cornell	8	–	6	.571	15	–	13	.536
Columbia	5	–	9	.357	16	–	12	.571
Dartmouth	5	–	9	.357	11	–	16	.407
Princeton	5	–	9	.357	9	–	20	.310
Brown	3	–	11	.214	9	–	18	.333
† 2026 Ivy League tournament winner

The 2025–26 Yale Bulldogs men's basketball team represented Yale University during the 2025–26 NCAA Division I men's basketball season. The Bulldogs, led by 26th-year head coach James Jones, played their home games at John J. Lee Amphitheater in New Haven, Connecticut as members of the Ivy League.

== Previous season ==
The Bulldogs finished the 2024–25 season 22–8, 13–1 in Ivy League play to finish in first place. In the Ivy League Tournament, they defeated Princeton and Cornell to earn the conference's automatic bid into the 2025 NCAA Tournament. As the No. 13 seed in the South region, the Bulldogs were defeated in the first round by No. 4 seed Texas A&M.

== Preseason ==
On October 23, 2025, the Ivy League released their preseason media poll. Yale was picked to finish first in the conference.

=== Preseason rankings ===
Ivy League Preseason Poll
Place	Team	Points
1	Yale	168 (21)
2	Harvard	126
3	Cornell	124
4	Princeton	97
5	Dartmouth	72
6	Brown	68
7	Penn	66
8	Columbia	35
(#) first-place votes

== Roster ==
2025–26 Yale Bulldogs men's basketball team
Players
Coaches

Pos.	#	Name	Height	Weight	Year	Hometown
G	0	Courtney Wallace	6 ft 2 in (1.88 m)	195 lb (88 kg)	Fr	Pittsburgh, Pennsylvania
G	1	Jacob Tsai	5 ft 11 in (1.8 m)	165 lb (75 kg)	Fr	San Diego, California
G	3	Jordan Brathwaite	6 ft 4 in (1.93 m)	190 lb (86 kg)	So	Fulton, Maryland
G	4	Alvin Loving	6 ft 4 in (1.93 m)	215 lb (98 kg)	Fr	Berkeley, California
F	7	Jack Sullivan	6 ft 11 in (2.11 m)	230 lb (104 kg)	Fr	Saint Augustine, Florida
F	8	Isaac Celiscar	6 ft 6 in (1.98 m)	210 lb (95 kg)	So	Winter Haven, Florida
F	9	Riley Fox	6 ft 6 in (1.98 m)	195 lb (88 kg)	So	West Hartford, Connecticut
C	10	Samson Aletan	6 ft 10 in (2.08 m)	223 lb (101 kg)	Jr	Dallas, Texas
G	11	Trevor Mullin	6 ft 1 in (1.85 m)	185 lb (84 kg)	Jr	Wellesley, Massachusetts
F	12	Daniel Ogunyemi	6 ft 7 in (2.01 m)	235 lb (107 kg)	Fr	Milton, Georgia
F	14	Casey Simmons	6 ft 7 in (2.01 m)	180 lb (82 kg)	Sr	Milton, Massachusetts
G	22	Jeannot Basima	6 ft 4 in (1.93 m)	190 lb (86 kg)	Jr	Goma, Democratic Republic of the Congo
G	24	Yassine Gharram	6 ft 3 in (1.91 m)	195 lb (88 kg)	Sr	San Diego, California
F	42	Nick Townsend	6 ft 7 in (2.01 m)	240 lb (109 kg)	Sr	Chappaqua, New York
G	44	Devon Arlington	6 ft 3 in (1.91 m)	190 lb (86 kg)	Sr	San Marcos, California

Head coach

- James Jones (Albany)

Assistant coach(es)

- Matt Kingsley (Wesleyan)
- Brandon Sherrod (Yale)
- Tobe Carberry (Vermont)

Legend

- (C) Team captain
- (S) Suspended
- (I) Ineligible
- (W) Walk-on
- Injured
- Current redshirt

Roster
Last update: October 28, 2025

== Schedule and results ==
Date time, TV	Rank^{#}	Opponent^{#}	Result	Record	Site (attendance) city, state
Regular season
November 7, 2025*; 8:30 p.m., CBSSN		at Navy; Veterans Classic	W 97–68	1–0	Alumni Hall (1,958); Annapolis, MD
November 11, 2025*; 7:30 p.m., ESPN+		at Quinnipiac	W 97–60	2–0	M&T Bank Arena (2,239); Hamden, CT
November 15, 2025*; 1:00 p.m., ESPN+		Stony Brook	W 86–79	3–0	John J. Lee Amphitheater (1,153); New Haven, CT
November 18, 2025*; 8:00 p.m., ESPN+		Rhode Island	L 77–86	3–1	John J. Lee Amphitheater (942); New Haven, CT
November 21, 2025*; 12:30 p.m., ESPN+		vs. Green Bay; Paradise Jam Quarterfinal	W 73–67	4–1	Sports and Fitness Center; St. Thomas, USVI
November 23, 2025*; 5:30 p.m., ESPN+		vs. Charleston; Paradise Jam Semifinal	W 74–63	5–1	Sports and Fitness Center; St. Thomas, USVI
November 24, 2025*; 8:00 p.m., ESPN+		vs. Akron; Paradise Jam Championship	W 97–94	6–1	Sports and Fitness Center (2,186); St. Thomas, USVI
November 30, 2025*; 2:00 p.m., ESPN+		at Vermont	W 77−74	7−1	Patrick Gym (2,057); Burlington, VT
December 2, 2025*; 7:00 p.m., ESPN+		SUNY–Maritime	W 117–53	8–1	John J. Lee Amphitheater (650); New Haven, CT
December 3, 2025*; 7:30 p.m., ESPN+		Brandeis	W 79–61	9–1	John J. Lee Amphitheater (597); New Haven, CT
December 7, 2025*; 2:00 p.m., ESPN+		UIC	W 80–66	10–1	John J. Lee Amphitheater (799); New Haven, CT
December 10, 2025*; 4:30 p.m., ESPNU		vs. Albany; Basketball Hall of Fame Classic	W 93−82	11−1	MassMutual Center (4,000); Springfield, MA
December 29, 2025*; 7:00 p.m., SECN+		at No. 14 Alabama	L 78–102	11–2	Coleman Coliseum (12,626); Tuscaloosa, AL
January 5, 2026; 7:00 p.m., ESPN+		at Brown	W 70–53	12–2 (1–0)	Pizzitola Sports Center (413); Providence, RI
January 10, 2026; 2:00 p.m., ESPN+		at Princeton	L 60–76	12–3 (1–1)	Jadwin Gymnasium (4,884); Princeton, NJ
January 17, 2026; 2:00 p.m., ESPN+		Cornell	W 102–68	13–3 (2–1)	John J. Lee Amphitheater (1,620); New Haven, CT
January 19, 2026; 2:00 p.m., ESPN+		Columbia	W 91–74	14–3 (3–1)	John J. Lee Amphitheater (1,652); New Haven, CT
January 24, 2026; 2:00 p.m., ESPN+		at Penn	W 77–60	15–3 (4–1)	The Palestra (2,806); Philadelphia, PA
January 30, 2026; 7:00 p.m., ESPN+		Dartmouth	W 83–68	16–3 (5–1)	John J. Lee Amphitheater (1,074); New Haven, CT
January 31, 2026; 7:00 p.m., ESPN+		Harvard	L 65–67	16–4 (5–2)	John J. Lee Amphitheater (2,425); New Haven, CT
February 6, 2026; 7:00 p.m., ESPN+		Brown	W 81–69	17–4 (6–2)	John J. Lee Amphitheater (1,101); New Haven, CT
February 9, 2026*; 7:00 p.m., ESPN+		at Howard	W 87–81 ^{OT}	18–4	Burr Gymnasium (2,381); Washington, D.C.
February 13, 2026; 7:00 p.m., ESPN+		at Dartmouth	W 83–70	19–4 (7–2)	Leede Arena (1,109); Hanover, NH
February 14, 2026; 6:30 p.m., ESPNU		at Harvard	W 76–75 ^{OT}	20–4 (8–2)	Lavietes Pavilion (1,636); Boston, MA
February 21, 2026; 2:00 p.m., ESPN+		Penn	W 74–70	21–4 (9–2)	John J. Lee Amphitheater (2,285); New Haven, CT
February 27, 2026; 6:00 p.m., ESPN+		at Cornell	L 69–72	21–5 (9–3)	Newman Arena; Ithaca, NY
February 28, 2026; 6:00 p.m., ESPN+		at Columbia	W 60–54	22–5 (10–3)	Levien Gymnasium (2,026); New York, NY
March 7, 2026; 2:00 p.m., ESPN+		Princeton	W 78–53	23–5 (11–3)	John J. Lee Amphitheater (1,920); New Haven, CT
Ivy League Tournament
March 14, 2026; 11:00 a.m., ESPNU	(1)	at (4) Cornell; Semifinals	W 88–76	24–5	Newman Arena; Ithaca, NY
March 15, 2026; 12:00 p.m., ESPN2	(1)	vs. (3) Penn; Championship	L 84–88 ^{OT}	24–6	Newman Arena; Ithaca, NY
NIT
March 17, 2026; 7:00 p.m., ESPN+	(3 WS)	UNC Wilmington; First round	L 67–68	24–7	John J. Lee Amphitheater (542); New Haven, CT
*Non-conference game. ^{#}Rankings from AP Poll. (#) Tournament seedings in parentheses. WS=Winston-Salem. All times are in Eastern Time.
