= Mike Martin (basketball, born 1982) =

American basketball player and coach (born 1982)

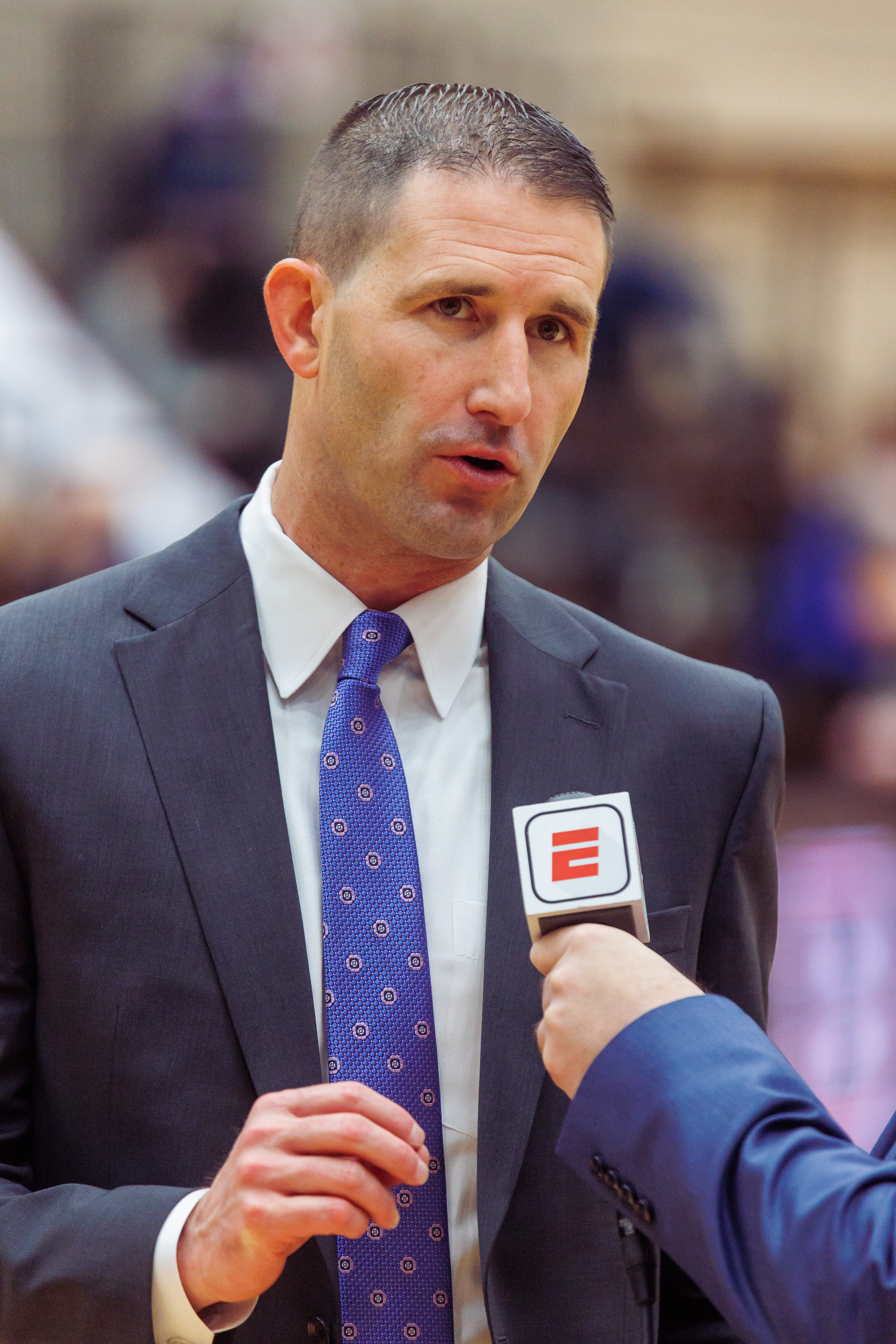
- Martin with Brown in 2023

Current position
- Title: Associate head coach
- Team: Michigan
- Conference: Big Ten

Biographical details
- Born: July 4, 1982 (age 44); Agawam, Massachusetts, U.S.

Playing career
- 2000–2004: Brown
- 2004–2005: Dart Killester

Coaching career (HC unless noted)
- 2005–2006: Brown (assistant)
- 2006–2012: Penn (assistant)
- 2012–2026: Brown
- 2026–present: Michigan (associate HC)

Head coaching record
- Overall: 171–202 (.458)
- Tournaments: 1–1 (CBI); 0–1 (CIT)

Accomplishments and honors

Awards
- Ivy League Coach of the Year (2019)

Mike Martin (born July 4, 1982) is an American college basketball coach, currently the Wolverines men's basketball associate head coach at the University of Michigan. He previously served as head coach of the Brown University Bears from 2012 until 2026, where he has the most career wins in Brown history. Martin also played basketball for Brown from 2000 until 2004.

== Playing career ==
Martin was in the starting lineup all four years of college basketball at Brown University. He was a member of the most successful class in the Bears' 100-year basketball history (63-45 four-year record). He also helped the Class of 2004 to a school-record 39-17 Ivy League mark during that period—the third best by an Ivy League team since 1970. Martin ranks 10th in career assists at Brown University with 232.

== Coaching career ==
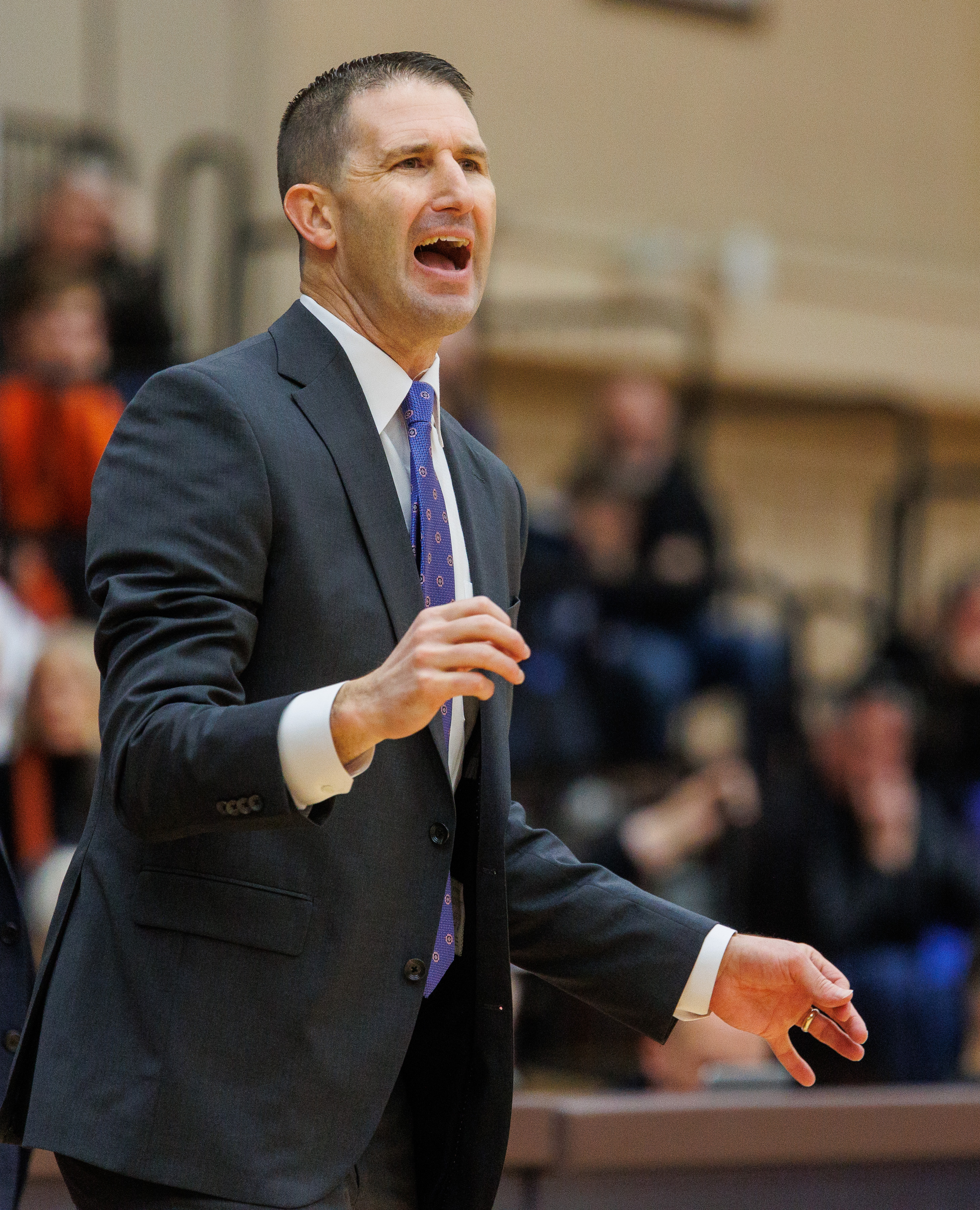
2023 game vs. Princeton

He served as assistant coach for the Quakers for six years and his roles were to recruit and mentor players. He has recruited many players including Jack Eggleston, was an All-Ivy and All-Big 5 selection during his career, and Zack Rosen, the unanimous pick by the Ancient Eight coaches as the 2011-12 Ivy League Player of the Year. Martin was hired as head coach at Brown on May 31, 2012.

In February 2023, Martin won his 134th game with the Bears, making him the winningest coach in the history of the Brown Bears basketball program.

On July 13, 2026, it was announced that Martin departed Brown and accepted a position as an assistant coach at the University of Michigan under new head coach Mike Boynton. In September 2026, Martin was given the title of associate head coach.

== Head coaching record ==
Record table
| Season | Team | Overall | Conference | Standing | Postseason |
|---|---|---|---|---|---|
Brown Bears (Ivy League) (2012–2026)
| 2012–13 | Brown | 13–15 | 7–7 | 4th | |
| 2013–14 | Brown | 15–14 | 7–7 | 5th | CIT First Round |
| 2014–15 | Brown | 13–18 | 4–10 | T–7th | |
| 2015–16 | Brown | 8–20 | 3–11 | T–7th | |
| 2016–17 | Brown | 13–17 | 4–10 | T–6th | |
| 2017–18 | Brown | 11–16 | 4–10 | 7th | |
| 2018–19 | Brown | 20–12 | 7–7 | T–4th | CBI Quarterfinals |
| 2019–20 | Brown | 15–12 | 8–6 | T–4th | |
| 2020–21 | Brown (Note: Brown did not play in the 2020–21 school year due to COVID-19 concerns.) | | | | |
| 2021–22 | Brown | 13–16 | 5–9 | T–6th | |
| 2022–23 | Brown | 14–13 | 7–7 | T–4th | |
| 2023–24 | Brown | 13–18 | 8–6 | 4th | |
| 2024–25 | Brown | 14–13 | 6–8 | 6th | |
| 2025–26 | Brown | 9–18 | 3–11 | 8th | |
| Brown: | | 171–202 (.458) | 73–109 (.401) | | |
| Total: | | 171–202 (.458) | | | |
