= Jon Jaques =

American basketball player (born 1988)

Cornell Big Red
- Position: Head coach
- League: Ivy League

Personal information
- Born: January 2, 1988 (age 38) Los Angeles, California, U.S.
- Listed height: 6 ft 7 in (2.01 m)
- Listed weight: 220 lb (100 kg)

Career information
- High school: Harvard-Westlake (Los Angeles, California)
- College: Cornell (2006–2010)
- NBA draft: 2010: undrafted
- Playing career: 2010–2011

Career history

Playing
- 2010–2011: Ironi Ashkelon

Coaching
- 2011–2012: Stevens Tech (assistant)
- 2012–2013: Columbia (GA)
- 2013–2022: Cornell (assistant)
- 2022–2024: Cornell (associate HC)
- 2024–present: Cornell

Jonathan David Jaques (born January 2, 1988) is an American men's basketball coach who is currently the head coach for Cornell University. He played college basketball for Cornell, and played professionally for Ironi Ashkelon in Israel.

== Early life ==
Jaques was born and raised in Brentwood in Los Angeles, California. His father is Doug Jaques, and his sister Clara was starting goalkeeper for the Washington University soccer team in St. Louis, where she was the all-time shutouts leader with 12 in one season. For high school, he attended and played basketball at Harvard-Westlake School in Los Angeles.

== College basketball career ==
He attended Cornell University (Biology; '10), and played basketball for four seasons for Cornell's Big Red men's basketball team, three of them with Ivy League Championship teams. In 2009-10 he was team tri-captain and played in 31 games (7th-most in the Ivy League), and had 42 three-point field goals (10th in the league) as he led the league in three-point percentage at 47.2%, and also won the Men's Basketball Rebounder Award.

== Professional basketball career ==
After graduating from Cornell, Jaques signed with Ironi Ashkelon in Ligat HaAl, the top division of Israeli basketball.

== Coaching career ==
For 2011–12, he was an assistant basketball coach of the Ducks at Stevens Institute of Technology in Hoboken, New Jersey. For the 2012–13 season he joined the Columbia University Lions men's basketball team as a graduate manager while attending the Mailman School of Public Health.

He was assistant men's basketball coach for Cornell University from 2013 to 2024 before becoming head coach in 2024.

== Head coaching record ==
Record table
| Season | Team | Overall | Conference | Standing | Postseason |
|---|---|---|---|---|---|
Cornell Big Red (Ivy League) (2024–present)
| 2024–25 | Cornell | 18–11 | 9–5 | 2nd | |
| 2025–26 | Cornell | 15–13 | 8–6 | 4th | |
| 2026–27 | Cornell | 2–3 | 0–0 | | |
| Cornell: | | 35–27 (.565) | 17–11 (.607) | | |
| Total: | | 35–27 (.565) | | | |
National champion Postseason invitational champion Conference regular season champion Conference regular season and conference tournament champion Division regular season champion Division regular season and conference tournament champion Conference tournament champion
