= David McLaughlin (basketball) =

American college basketball coach (born 1974)

Current position
- Team: Colby

Biographical details
- Born: July 5, 1974 (age 52); Brockton, Massachusetts, U.S.

Playing career
- 1994–1997: Colby

Coaching career (HC unless noted)
- 1997–1998: Suffolk (assistant)
- 1998–2000: Wesleyan (assistant)
- 2000–2004: Stonehill (assistant)
- 2004–2013: Stonehill
- 2013–2016: Northeastern (assistant)
- 2016–2026: Dartmouth
- 2026–present: Colby

Head coaching record
- Overall: 276–260 (.515)
- Tournaments: 10–5 (NCAA Division II)

Accomplishments and honors

Championships
- NE-10 regular season (2010); NE-10 tournament (2012)

Awards
- Ivy League Coach of the Year (2025)

David Adam McLaughlin (born July 5, 1974) is an American college basketball coach who is the head coach of the Colby Mules men's basketball team. He was previously the men's basketball coach at Dartmouth and Stonehill.

== Coaching career ==
After a playing career at Colby College, McLaughlin began coaching as a graduate assistant at Suffolk University. He had a tenure as an assistant at Wesleyan University before landing at Stonehill College in 2000. During the 2004 season, McLaughlin assumed the duties of interim head coach, earning the head coaching job for the 2004-05 season. In his first season at the helm, the Skyhawks went 20-8, which led to six 20-win seasons in nine seasons at the helm, along with five NCAA Division II tournament bids, including two Final Four appearances. He finished his Stonehill career with a 189-99 overall record, and 135-80 in Northeast-10 play.

In 2013, McLaughlin joined Bill Coen's staff at Northeastern University, and was part of the staff that won the Huskies' first-ever CAA Tournament title, and first NCAA bid in 24 years.

On April 25, 2016, McLaughlin was named the 28th coach in Dartmouth Big Green history. In March 2026, it was announced that McLaughlin's contract would not be renewed. He amassed an overall record of 87–161 during his tenure with the school.

On April 30, 2026, McLaughlin was named head coach of Colby College's men's basketball team.

== Family ==
McLaughlin is married to Jenna McLaughlin. He and his wife have three children (Sydney, Ryan, and Colin), and currently live in Hanover, New Hampshire.

== Head coaching record ==
Record table
Season	Team	Overall	Conference	Standing	Postseason
Stonehill Skyhawks (Northeast-10 Conference) (2004–2013)
2004–05	Stonehill	20–8	16–6	5th	
2005–06	Stonehill	27–7	17–5	2nd	NCAA Division II Final Four
2006–07	Stonehill	16–12	11–11	7th	
2007–08	Stonehill	18–14	12–10	5th	
2008–09	Stonehill	21–8	16–6	3rd	NCAA Division II First Round
2009–10	Stonehill	24–6	20–2	1st	NCAA Division II Second Round
2010–11	Stonehill	22–8	16–6	2nd	NCAA Division II Second Round
2011–12	Stonehill	25–9	15–7	3rd	NCAA Division II Final Four
2012–13	Stonehill	11–15	7–15	13th	
Stonehill:		189–99 (.656)	135–80 (.628)		
Dartmouth Big Green (Ivy League) (2016–2026)
2016–17	Dartmouth	7–20	4–10	T–6th	
2017–18	Dartmouth	7–20	3–11	8th	
2018–19	Dartmouth	11–19	2–12	8th	
2019–20	Dartmouth	12–17	5–9	6th	
2020–21	Dartmouth	Season Canceled			
2021–22	Dartmouth	9–16	6–8	6th	
2022–23	Dartmouth	10–18	6–8	6th	
2023–24	Dartmouth	6–21	2–12	8th	
2024–25	Dartmouth	14–14	8–6	T–3rd	
2025–26	Dartmouth	11–16	5–9	T–5th	
Dartmouth:		87–161 (.351)	41–84 (.328)		
Total:		276–260 (.515)			
National champion Postseason invitational champion Conference regular season champion Conference regular season and conference tournament champion Division regular season champion Division regular season and conference tournament champion Conference tournament champion
