= Cornell Big Red men's basketball =

Men's basketball team of Cornell University

| 2026–27 Cornell Big Red men's basketball team |
- University: Cornell University
- Head coach: Jon Jaques (3rd season)
- Location: Ithaca, New York
- Arena: Newman Arena (capacity: 4,472)
- Conference: Ivy League
- Nickname: Big Red
- Colors: Carnelian red and white

NCAA Division I tournament Sweet Sixteen
- 1954, 2010

NCAA Division I tournament appearances
- 1954, 1988, 2008, 2009, 2010

Conference regular-season champions
- EIBL: 1913, 1914, 1924, 1954; Ivy: 1988, 2008, 2009, 2010

Uniforms
| Home | Away |

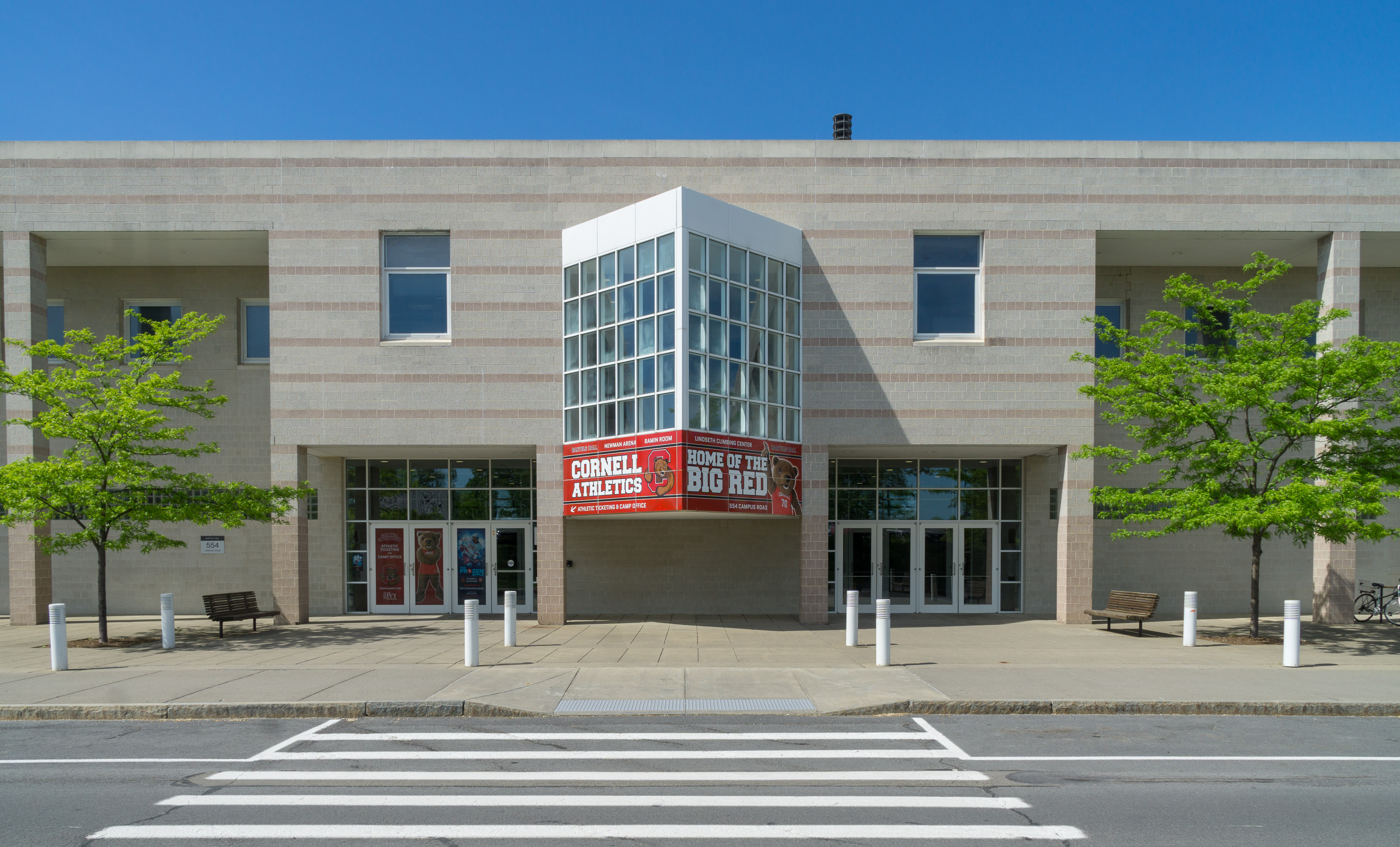
Bartels Hall, home of Newman Arena. Opened 1990.

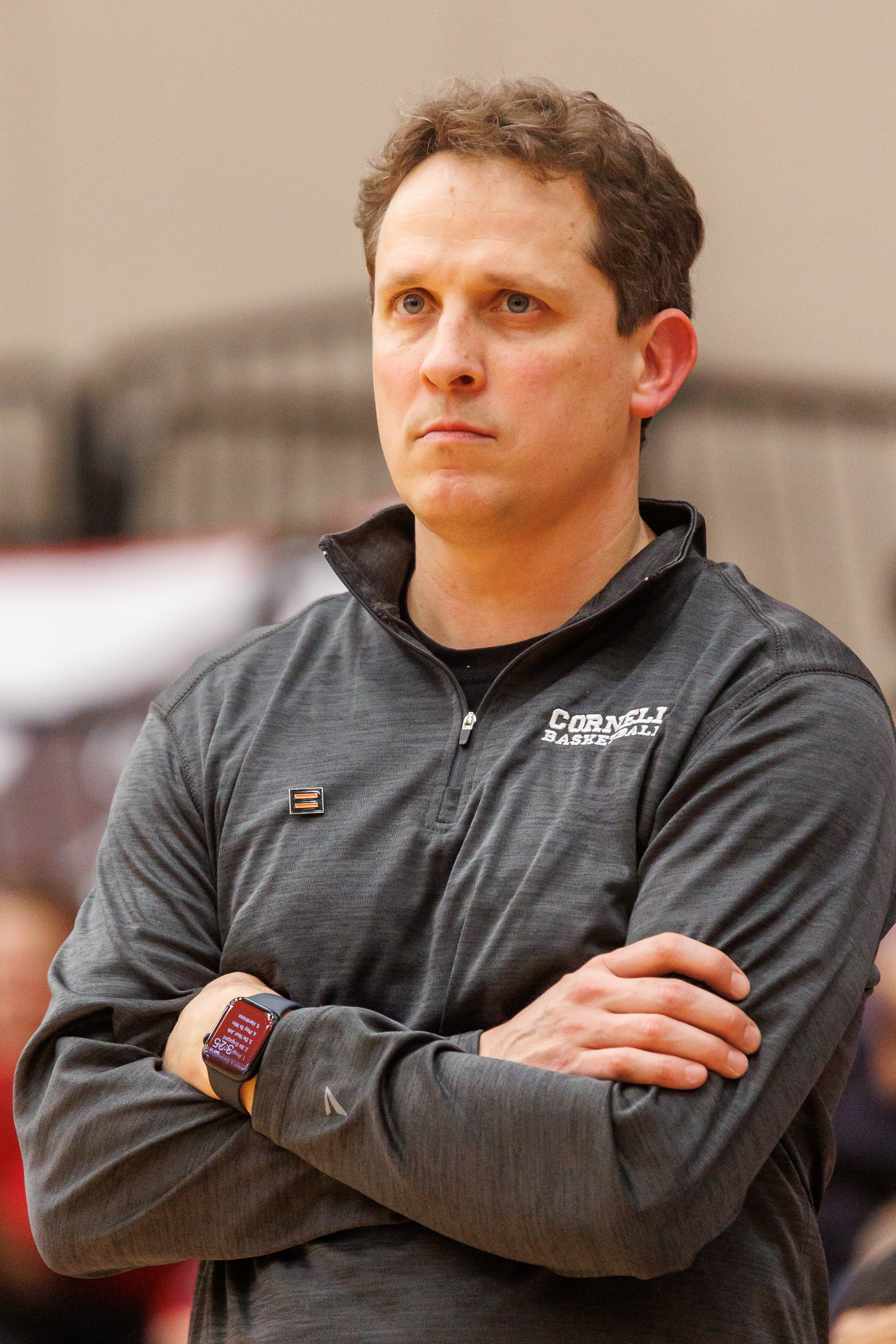
Former coach Brian Earl

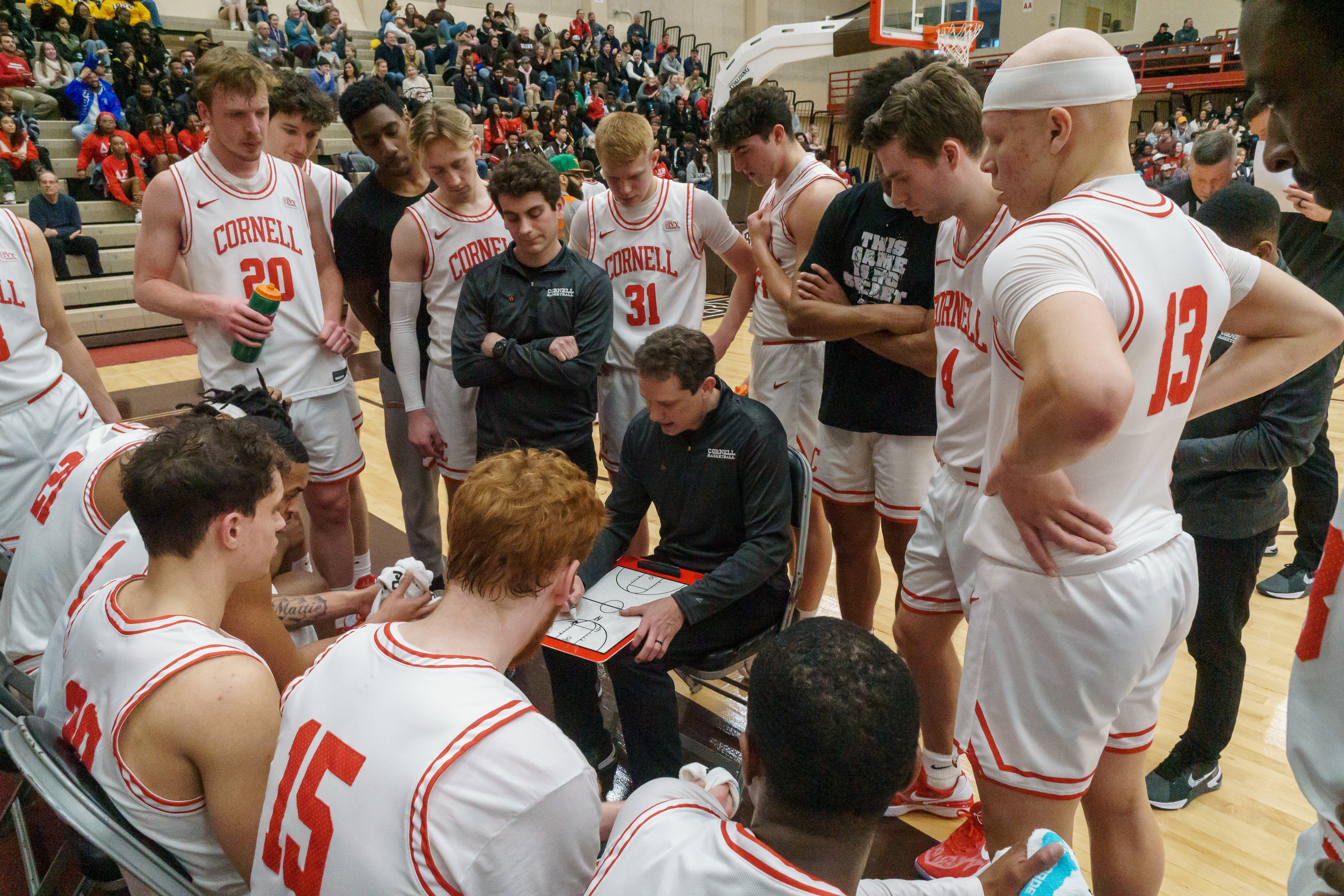
2022-23 players

The Cornell Big Red men's basketball team represents Cornell University (one of eight members of the Ivy League), located in Ithaca, New York, in NCAA Division I men's competition. The Big Red's appearance in the 2008 NCAA Tournament was their first trip to "The Big Dance" since 1988, ending a 20 year absence from the tournament. The team has reached the NCAA Division I men's basketball tournament five times, in 1954, 1988, 2008, 2009, and 2010. Cornell’s best finish in the NCAA tournament occurred in 1954 and 2010 when they advanced to the Sweet 16. Jon Jaques is the current head coach.

== History ==
Cornell played its first basketball game on December 13, 1898, a 48–12 victory over the Waverly YMCA. The team would finish the short season with a record of 1–3. The program did not record a winning season until 1908–1909 when the team went 13–10. Beginning with the 1901–1902 season and ending with the 1954–1955 season Cornell competed in the Eastern Intercollegiate Basketball League which at various points in its history consisted of between four and eight schools, all of whom would eventually join the Ivy League upon its creation in 1954. Cornell won the EIBL title four times, including 1954 in a one-game playoff over Princeton which would earn the Big Red their first trip to the NCAA tournament. The 1955–56 season was the first year of competition under the new Ivy League organization. Cornell has since won the Ivy League title four times, most recently in 2010. That year marked the first time Cornell would win a game in the NCAA tournament.

Cornell moved into their current home, Newman Arena in Bartels Hall in January 1990. From February 16, 1919 home games had been played in Barton Hall, originally referred to simply as the "New Armory". Earlier games had been played in the previous armory which was located on what is now the engineering quad.

== All-time postseason results ==
=== NCAA tournament results ===
The 2010 tournament was the Big Red's fifth appearance in the NCAA Tournament. Their combined record is 2–6.

In 2010, the men's basketball team defeated fifth-seeded Temple followed by fourth-seeded Wisconsin to advance to the Sweet Sixteen, becoming the first Ivy League team to advance that far since Penn's Final Four appearance in 1979. The win over Temple marked the first time Cornell ever won a game in the NCAA tournament.

| Year | Seed | Round | Opponent | Result |
|---|---|---|---|---|
| 1954 | n/a | Sweet Sixteen; Regional third-place game | Navy; NC State | L 69–67; L 65–54 |
| 1988 | #16 | First round | #1 Arizona | L 90–50 |
| 2008 | #14 | First round | #3 Stanford | L 77–53 |
| 2009 | #14 | First round | #3 Missouri | L 78–59 |
| 2010 | #12 | First round Second round Sweet Sixteen | #5 Temple #4 Wisconsin #1 Kentucky | W 78–65; W 87–69; L 62–45 |

=== National Invitation Tournament (NIT) results ===
Cornell has been selected to participate in one National Invitation Tournament. Their record is 0-1.

| Year | Round | Opponent | Result |
|---|---|---|---|
| 2024 | First round | Ohio State | L 88–83 |

=== CollegeInsider.com Postseason Tournament (CIT) results ===
Cornell has been selected to participate in one CollegeInsider.com Postseason Tournament. Their record is 0–1.

| Year | Round | Opponent | Result |
|---|---|---|---|
| 2019 | First round | Robert Morris | L 98–89^{(OT)} |
