= Pizzitola Sports Center =

Athletic center in Providence, Rhode Island, US

Paul Bailey Pizzitola Memorial Sports Center
- The Pitz, The Towers
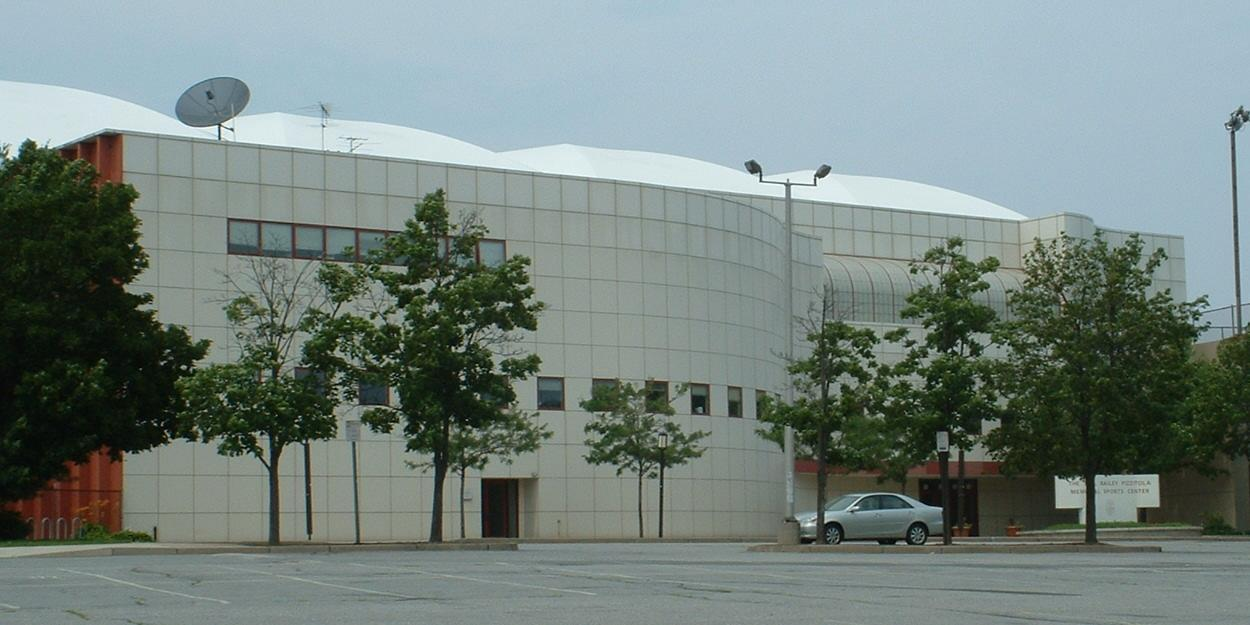
- Interactive map of Paul Bailey Pizzitola Memorial Sports Center
- Location: Hope St & Lloyd Ave; Providence, RI 02906
- Coordinates: 41°49′54″N 71°23′53″W
- Owner: Brown University
- Operator: Brown University
- Capacity: 2,800

Construction
- Groundbreaking: 1987
- Opened: February 1989
- Cost: $7.6 million
- Architects: Eggers Group, New York City

Tenants
- Brown Bears (basketball, volleyball, gymnastics, wrestling, squash)

The Paul Bailey Pizzitola Memorial Sports Center, often referred to as "the Pitz" by students, is a 2,800-seat multi-purpose athletic center in Providence, Rhode Island, USA, which was built in 1989. It is home to the Brown University Bears men's and women's basketball, volleyball, gymnastics, wrestling and squash teams. It was built adjacent to Meehan Auditorium on Lloyd Avenue as a replacement for Marvel Gymnasium, which was located next to Brown Stadium on Elmgrove Ave. The building was named for Paul Bailey Pizzitola (class of 1981), whose father contributed $2 million to its construction. The lobby of the building is named for the Brown attendee (1887–89) and American football legend John Heisman (class of 1891).

== Gallery ==
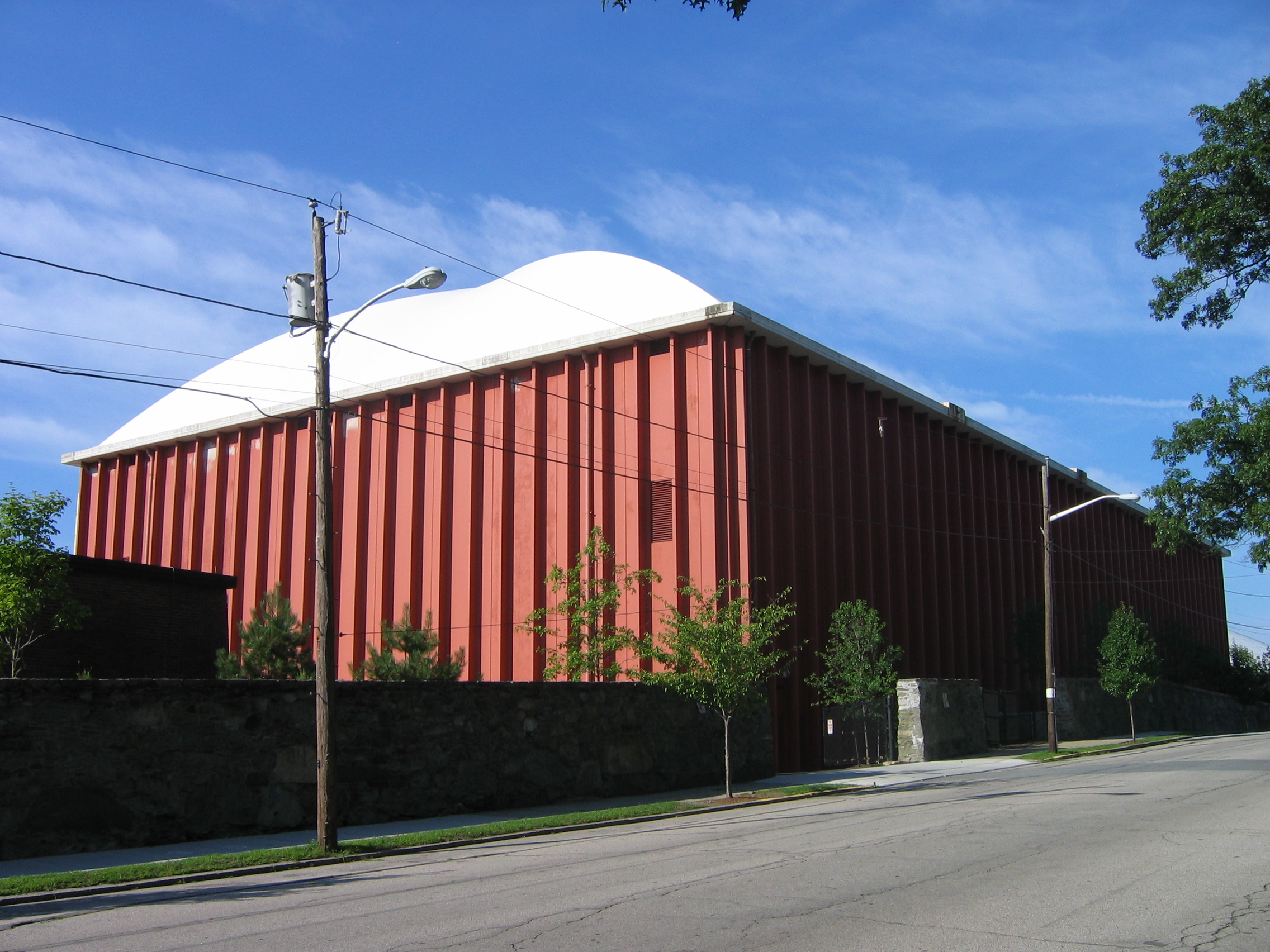
View from Lloyd Avenue

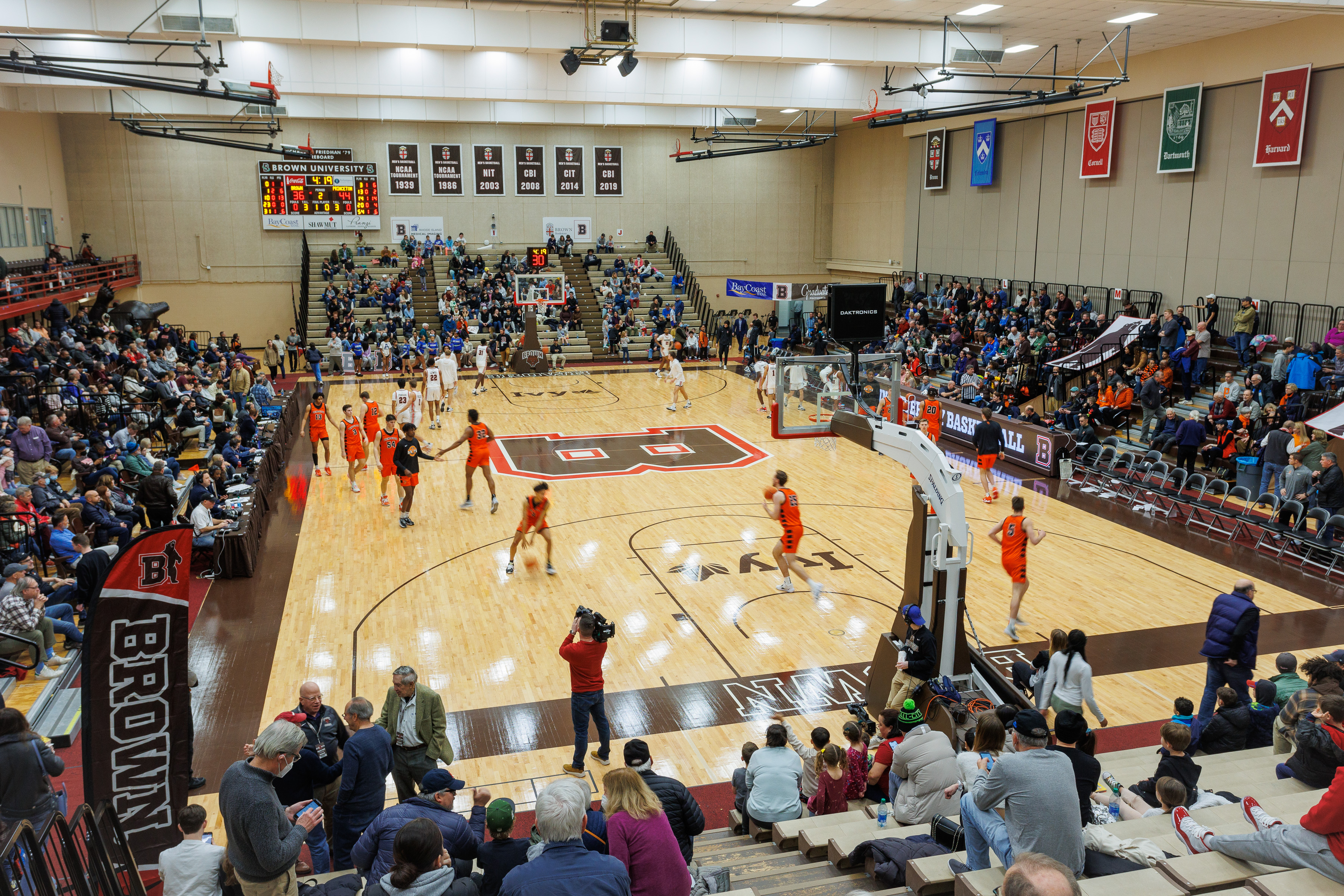
Pizzitola interior

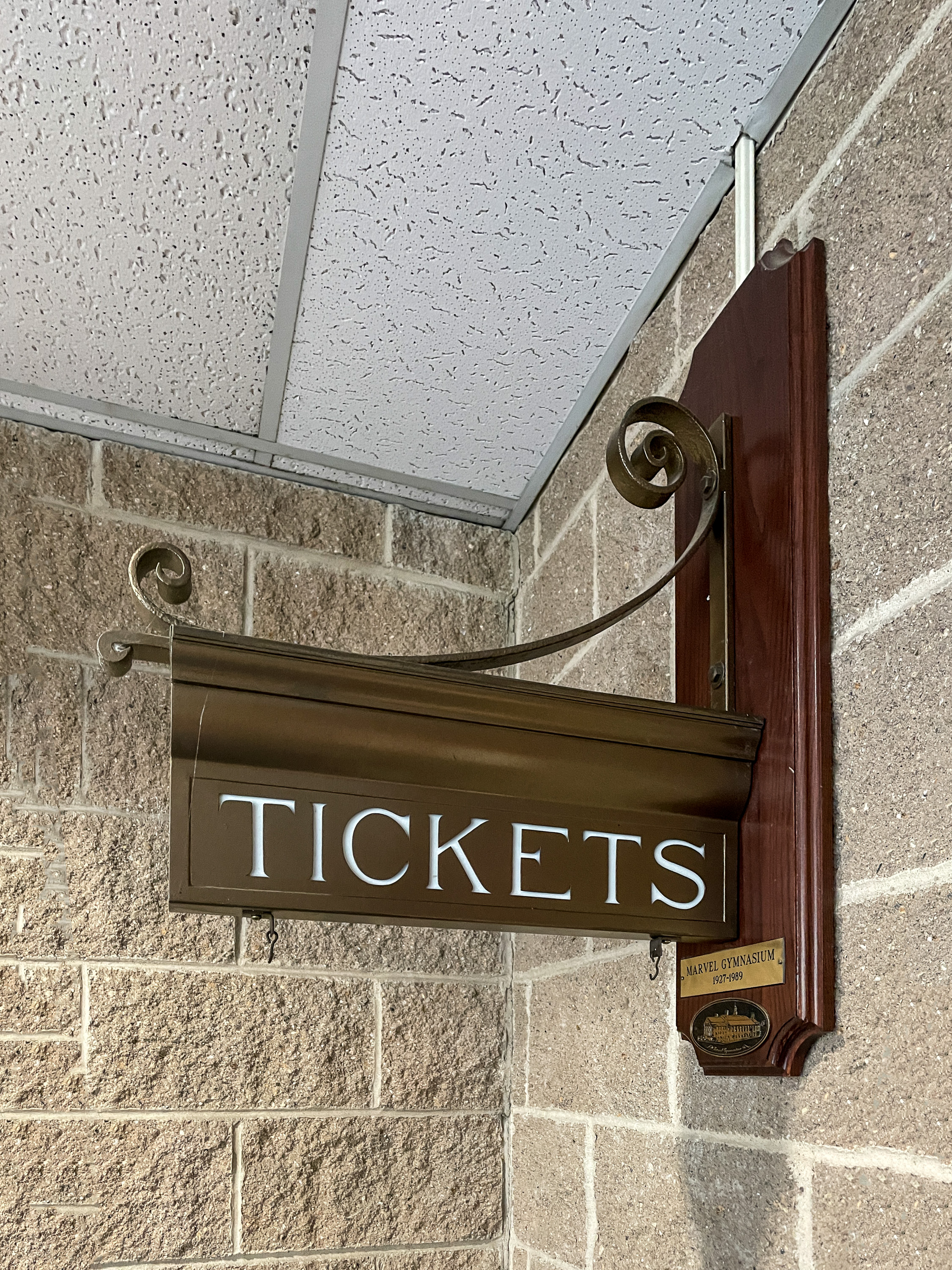
TICKETS sign salvaged from Marvel Gymnasium and installed at the Pizzitola ticket window
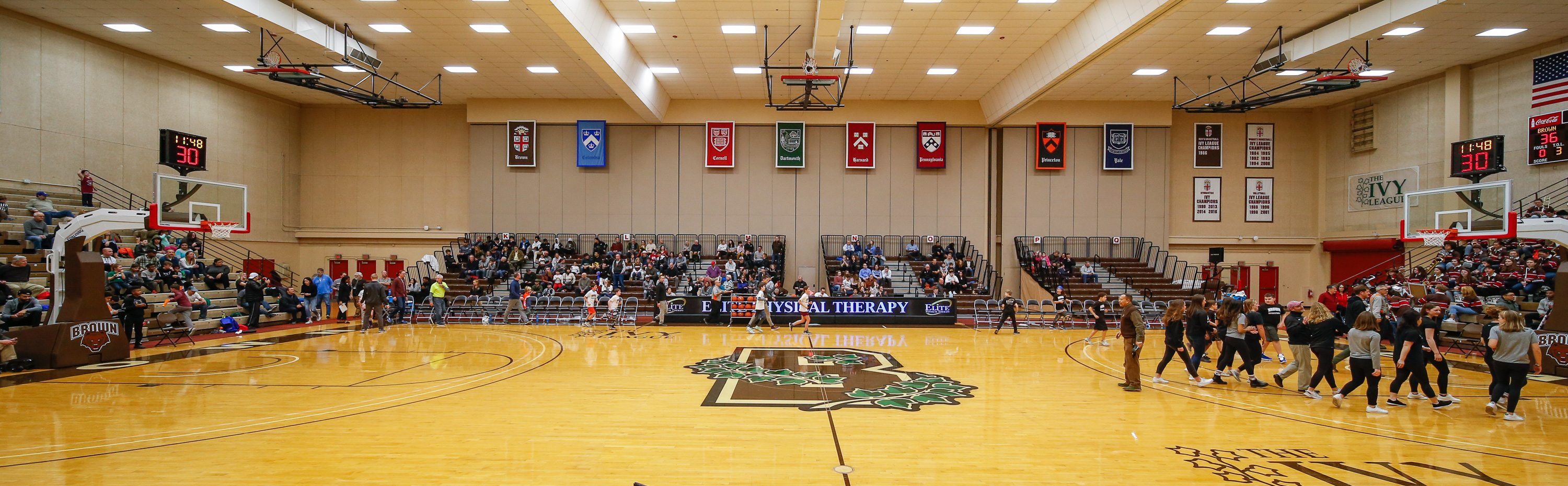
Pizzitola panorama, 2020

== See also ==
- List of NCAA Division I basketball arenas
