= Newman Arena =

Multi-purpose indoor arena at Cornell University in Ithaca, New York, U.S.

F.R. Newman Arena
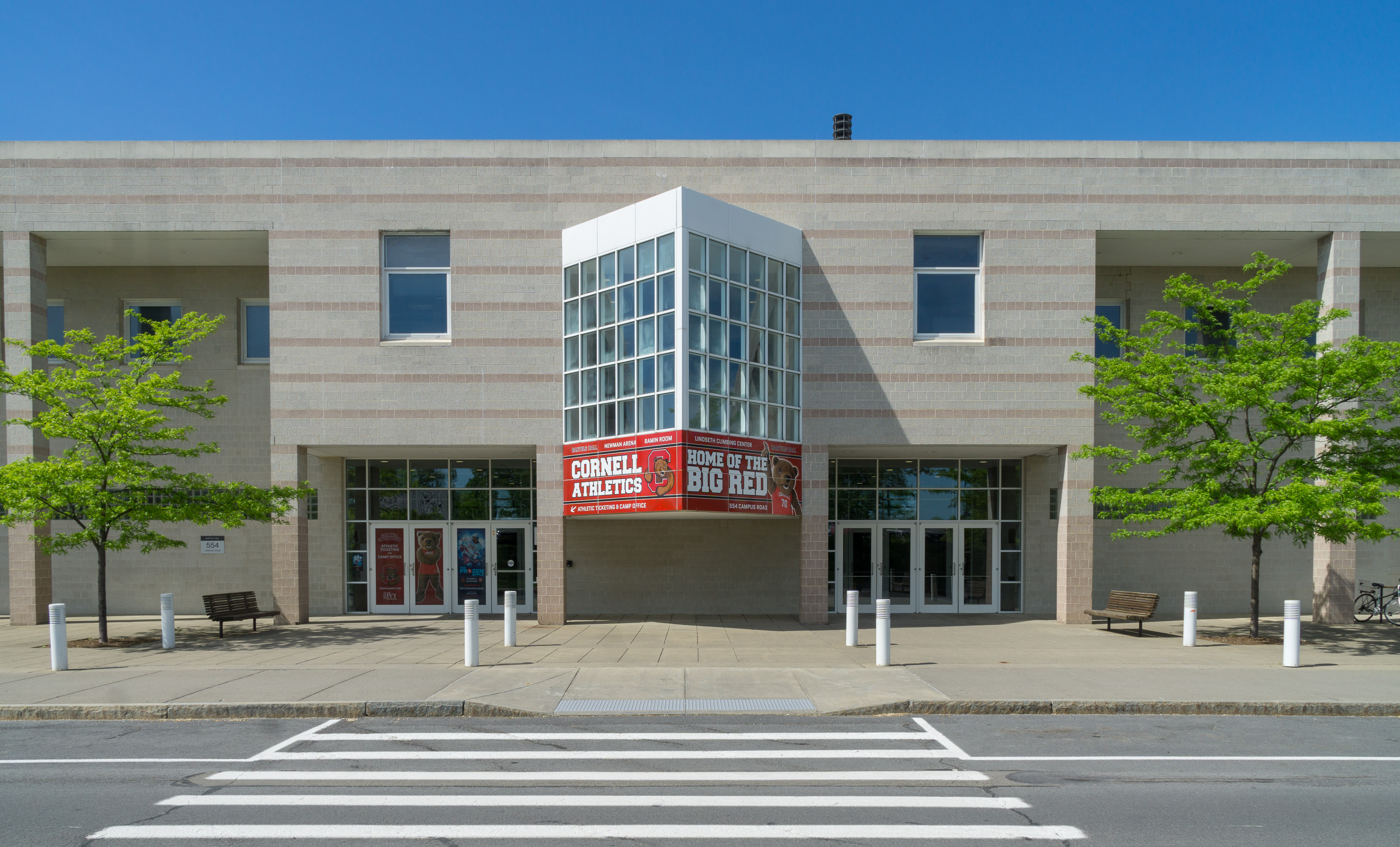
- Newman Arena is located in Bartels Hall
- Interactive map of F.R. Newman Arena
- Location: Campus Road; Cornell University; Ithaca, New York 14853
- Coordinates: 42.445794°N 76.476581°W
- Owner: Cornell University
- Operator: Cornell University
- Capacity: 4,472

Construction
- Opened: January 6, 1990

Tenants
- Cornell Big Red (basketball and volleyball)

Newman Arena is a 4,473-seat multi-purpose arena at Cornell University in Ithaca, New York, located in Bartels Hall, which is adjacent to Lynah Rink. It is home to the Cornell Big Red basketball and volleyball teams. It also holds the home of Cornell wrestling for larger events. It opened in January 1990, replacing Barton Hall, which was remodeled to become a full-time indoor track venue. It was named for the late Floyd R. Newman, Class of 1912, a major benefactor to the university.

== See also ==
- List of NCAA Division I basketball arenas
