= Ivy League men's basketball =

US sports season

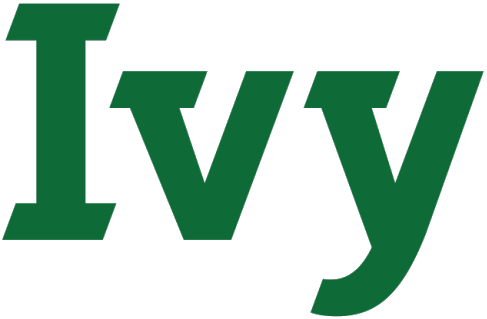
- Conference: Ivy League
- Number of teams: 8
- Last contest: 2023–24
- Current champion: Princeton
- Most championships: Princeton (29)
- Official website: ivyleague.com/mbball

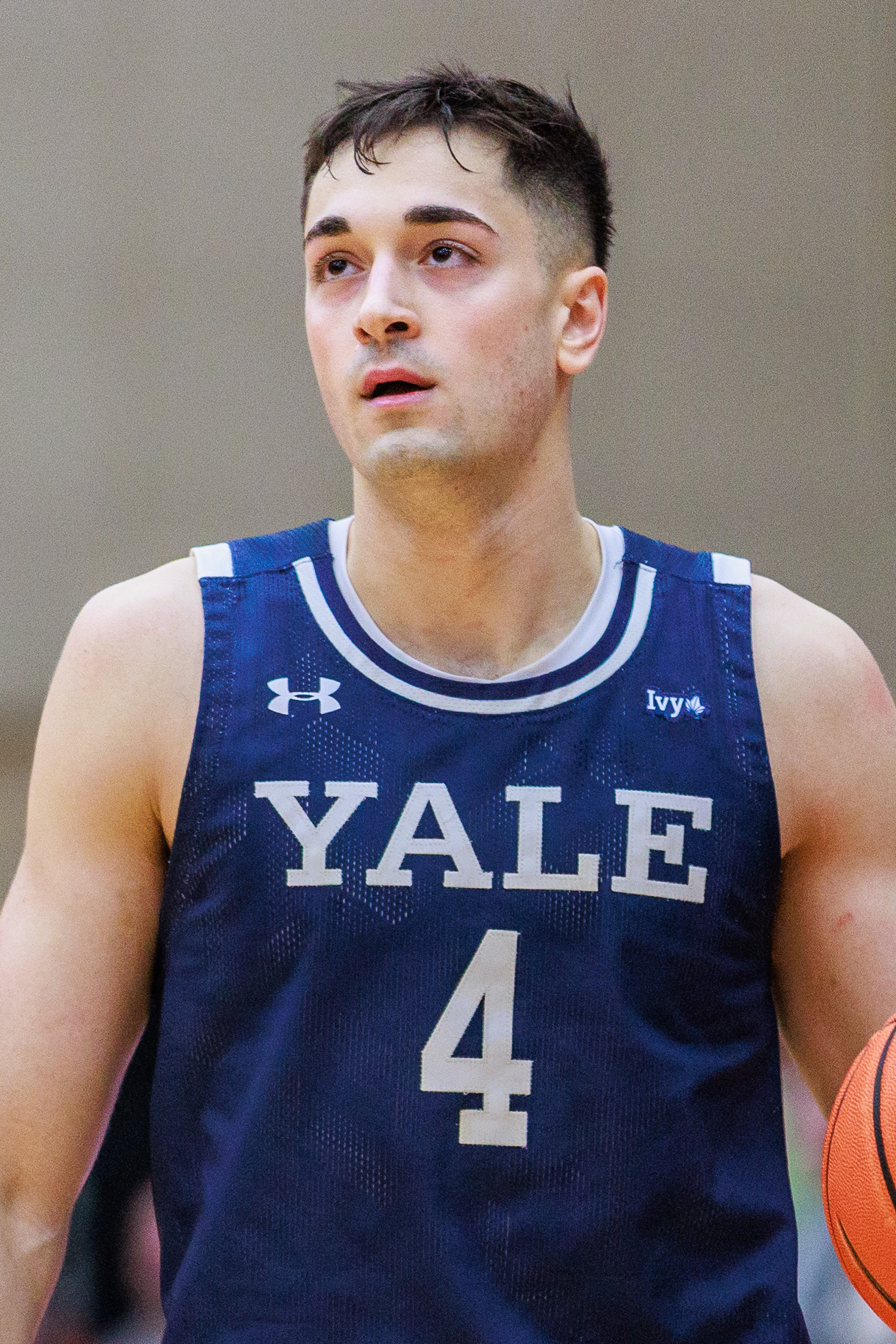
Yale's John Poulakidas received 2025 All-Tournament MVP honors

The Ivy League men's basketball is the conference college basketball championship of the NCAA Division I Ivy League. The eight schools compete annually in men's basketball.

The following is a list of past conference champions and a list of notable players. At the conclusion of the regular season the team with the best league record is crowned league champion. If two or more teams are tied for first place at the end of the season the league title is shared. Prior to 2017, the league champion received the league's automatic bid to the NCAA Division I men's basketball tournament.

In the event of a shared title a playoff would be held to determine the league's automatic bid. Beginning in 2017 a tournament consisting of the top four teams in the standings is held to determine the recipient of the automatic bid to the NCAA tournament. However, the league championship is still based on regular season standings. The Ivy League was the last Division I conference without a tournament following the regular season.

Princeton was the 2023-2024 league regular season champions, and Yale won in the 2023-2024 tournament,

== Championships by season ==
=== Ivy League champions ===
| Season | Champion/s | Notes |
|---|---|---|
| 2025–26 | Yale | Penn won tournament |
| 2024-25 | Yale | Yale won tournament |
| 2023–24 | Princeton | Yale won tournament |
| 2022–23 | Princeton and Yale | Princeton won tournament |
| 2021–22 | Princeton | Yale won the tournament |
| 2020–21 | Yale | Ivy League Men's Basketball season was canceled due to COVID-19 |
| 2019–20 | Yale | Ivy League Men's Basketball Tournament was canceled due to COVID-19 |
| 2018–19 | Yale and Harvard | Yale won tournament |
| 2017–18 | Penn and Harvard | Penn won tournament |
| 2016–17 | Princeton | |
| 2015–16 | Yale | |
| 2014–15 | Harvard and Yale | Harvard won playoff game for league's automatic bid to NCAA tournament |
| 2013–14 | Harvard | |
| 2012–13 | Harvard | |
| 2011–12 | Harvard | |
| 2010–11 | Harvard and Princeton | Princeton won playoff game for league's automatic bid to NCAA tournament |
| 2009–10 | Cornell | |
| 2008–09 | Cornell | |
| 2007–08 | Cornell | |
| 2006–07 | Pennsylvania | |
| 2005–06 | Pennsylvania | |
| 2004–05 | Pennsylvania | |
| 2003–04 | Princeton | |
| 2002–03 | Pennsylvania | |
| 2001–02 | Pennsylvania, Yale, Princeton | Penn won playoff for league's automatic bid to NCAA tournament |
| 2000–01 | Princeton | |
| 1999–00 | Pennsylvania | |
| 1998–99 | Pennsylvania | |
| 1997–98 | Princeton | |
| 1996–97 | Princeton | |
| 1995–96 | Princeton and Pennsylvania | Princeton won playoff game for league's automatic bid to NCAA tournament |
| 1994–95 | Pennsylvania | |
| 1993–94 | Pennsylvania | |
| 1992–93 | Pennsylvania | |
| 1991–92 | Princeton | |
| 1990-91 | Princeton | |
| 1989-90 | Princeton | |
| 1988-89 | Princeton | |
| 1987-88 | Cornell | |

=== Ivy League tournament champions ===
The Ivy League began a post-season tournament in 2017. The winner receives the league's automatic bid to the NCAA tournament. In 2020, the Ivy League canceled its tournament during the COVID-19 pandemic and awarded Yale an automatic bid to the NCAA tournament, the latter of which was later also cancelled. In 2021, the Ivy League did not play regular season matchups during the COVID-19 pandemic. The 2020 and 2021 seasons thus are omitted.

| Year | Champion | Seed | Score | Runner-up | Seed | MVP | Venue |
|---|---|---|---|---|---|---|---|
| 2017 | Princeton | 1 | 71-59 | Yale | 3 | Myles Stephens, Princeton | Palestra, University of Pennsylvania |
| 2018 | Pennsylvania | 2 | 68-65 | Harvard | 1 | A.J. Brodeur, Penn | Palestra, University of Pennsylvania |
| 2019 | Yale | 2 | 97-85 | Harvard | 1 | Alex Copeland, Yale | Payne Whitney Gymnasium, Yale University |
| 2022 | Yale | 2 | 66-64 | Princeton | 1 | Azar Swain, Yale | Lavietes Pavilion, Harvard University |
| 2023 | Princeton | 2 | 74-65 | Yale | 1 | Tosan Evbuomwan, Princeton | Jadwin Gymnasium, Princeton University |
| 2024 | Yale | 2 | 62-61 | Brown | 4 | Danny Wolf, Yale | Levien Gymnasium, Columbia University |
| 2025 | Yale | 1 | 90-84 | Cornell | 2 | John Poulakidas, Yale | Pizzitola Sports Center, Brown University |

== NCAA tournament bids ==
| Bids | School | Last bid | Last win | Last Sweet 16 | Last Elite 8 | Last Final 4 | Last final | Last champ. | Record |
|---|---|---|---|---|---|---|---|---|---|
| 26 | Princeton | 2023 | 2023 | 2023 | 1965 | 1965 | | | 14–29 |
| 25 | Pennsylvania | 2026 | 1994 | 1979 | 1979 | 1979 | | | 13–27 |
| 8 | Yale | 2025 | 2024 | | | | | | 2–9 |
| 7 | Dartmouth | 1959 | 1958 | 1958 | 1958 | 1944 | 1944 | | 10–7 |
| 5 | Cornell | 2010 | 2010 | 2010 | | | | | 2–6 |
| 5 | Harvard | 2015 | 2014 | | | | | | 2–6 |
| 3 | Columbia | 1968 | 1968 | 1968 | | | | | 2–4 |
| 2 | Brown | 1986 | | | | | | | 0–2 |
| Total: 81 | | | | | | | | | 45–90 |

== Ivy League NBA players ==
These players attended one of the eight Ivy League institutions and had professional careers in the National Basketball Association.

- Bill Bradley
- Devin Cannady
- Chris Dudley
- Jeremy Lin
- Walter Palmer
- Jack Molinas
- Miye Oni
- Devin Cannady
- Ira Bowman
- Matt Langel
- Jerome Allen
- Tony Price
- Rudy LaRusso
- Corky Calhoun
- Dave Wohl
- Matt Maloney
- Jim McMillian
- Geoff Petrie
- Armond Hill
- Brian Taylor
- Jeff Foote
- Tosan Evbuomwan
- Phil Hankinson
