= 2023–24 Ivy League men's basketball season =

- League: NCAA Division I
- Sport: Basketball
- Teams: 8
- TV partner: Ivy League Digital Network

Regular season
- Champions: Princeton
- Season MVP: Caden Pierce, Princeton

2024 Ivy League men's basketball tournament
- Champions: Yale
- Runners-up: Brown

Basketball seasons
- 2022–23 2024–25

2023–24 Ivy League men's basketball standings
	Conf.				Overall
Team	W		L	PCT	W		L	PCT
Princeton	12	–	2	.857	24	–	5	.828
Yale †	11	–	3	.786	23	–	10	.697
Cornell	11	–	3	.786	22	–	8	.733
Brown	8	–	6	.571	13	–	18	.419
Harvard	5	–	9	.357	14	–	13	.519
Columbia	4	–	10	.286	13	–	14	.481
Penn	3	–	11	.214	11	–	18	.379
Dartmouth	2	–	12	.143	6	–	21	.222
† 2024 Ivy League tournament winner

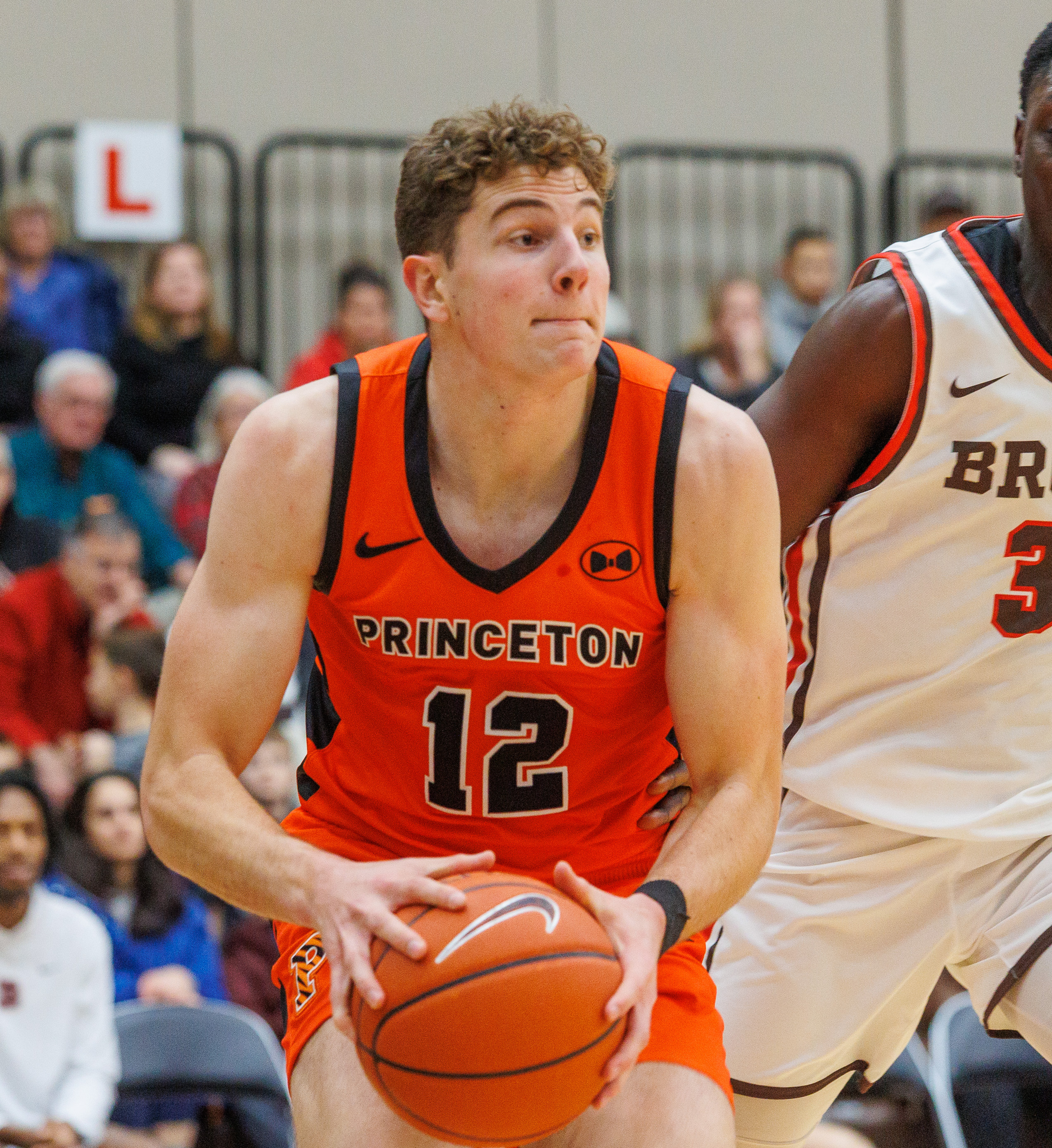
Caden Pierce, Ivy League Men's Basketball Player of the Year

The 2023–24 Ivy League men's basketball season marked the continuation of the annual tradition of competitive basketball among Ivy League members. The tradition began when the league was formed during the 1956–57 season and its history extends to the predecessor Eastern Intercollegiate Basketball League, which was formed in 1902.

Princeton earned the league title after finishing the regular season a league-best 12–2. However, in the Ivy League tournament, Princeton lost to Brown, 90–81. Yale, who had defeated Cornell 69–57 in the other leg of the tournament, then defeated Brown in a last-second comeback win, 62–61, earning the league's bid to the 2024 NCAA Men's Division I Basketball Tournament.

Caden Pierce of Princeton was named Ivy League Men's Basketball Player of the Year.

== All-Ivy Teams ==
First Team All-Ivy
	School	Class	Position
Caden Pierce*	Princeton	Sophomore	Guard
Chris Manon*	Cornell	Senior	Guard
Xaivian Lee*	Princeton	Sophomore	Guard
Danny Wolf*	Yale	Sophomore	Forward
Kino Lilly	Brown	Junior	Guard

*Unanimous

Second Team All-Ivy
	School	Class	Position
Nana Owusu-Anane	Brown	Junior	Forward
Nazir Williams	Cornell	Junior	Guard
Clark Slajchert	Penn	Senior	Guard
Matt Allocco	Princeton	Senior	Guard
Bez Mbeng	Yale	Junior	Guard
John Poulakidas	Yale	Junior	Guard

== NCAA tournament ==
Seed	Region	School	First Four	Round of 64	Round of 32	Sweet 16	Elite Eight	Final Four	Championship
13	West	Yale	n/a	Defeated Auburn, 78–76	Eliminated by San Diego State, 85-57				
		W–L (%):	0–0 –	1–0 1.000	0–1 .000	0–0 –	0–0 –	0–0 –	0–0 –Total:1-1 .500
