= 2023–24 Cornell Big Red men's basketball team =

American college basketball season

2023–24 Cornell Big Red men's basketball

Jacksonville Classic Bay champions

NIT, First Round
- Conference: Ivy League
- Record: 22–8 (11–3 Ivy)
- Head coach: Brian Earl (7th season)
- Associate head coach: Jon Jaques
- Assistant coaches: Max Ginsberg; Jalen Hayes
- Home arena: Newman Arena

2023–24 Ivy League men's basketball standings
	Conf.				Overall
Team	W		L	PCT	W		L	PCT
Princeton	12	–	2	.857	24	–	5	.828
Yale †	11	–	3	.786	23	–	10	.697
Cornell	11	–	3	.786	22	–	8	.733
Brown	8	–	6	.571	13	–	18	.419
Harvard	5	–	9	.357	14	–	13	.519
Columbia	4	–	10	.286	13	–	14	.481
Penn	3	–	11	.214	11	–	18	.379
Dartmouth	2	–	12	.143	6	–	21	.222
† 2024 Ivy League tournament winner

The 2023–24 Cornell Big Red men's basketball team represented Cornell University in the 2023–24 NCAA Division I men's basketball season. The Big Red, led by seventh-year head coach Brian Earl, played their home games at Newman Arena in Ithaca, New York, as members of the Ivy League.

== Previous season ==
The Big Red finished the 2022–23 season 17–10, 7–7 in Ivy League play to finish in fourth place. They were defeated by Yale in the semifinals of the Ivy League tournament.

== Roster ==
2023–24 Cornell Big Red men's basketball team
Players
Coaches

Pos.	#	Name	Height	Weight	Year	Hometown
F	0	Evan Williams	6 ft 7 in (2.01 m)	220 lb (100 kg)	Sr	Murphy, Texas
G	1	Nazir Williams	6 ft 3 in (1.91 m)	184 lb (83 kg)	Jr	Nyack, New York
F	2	Ian Imegwu	6 ft 9 in (2.06 m)	226 lb (103 kg)	Fr	Short Hills, New Jersey
F/C	3	Ryan Kiachian	6 ft 10 in (2.08 m)	228 lb (103 kg)	Jr	Los Altos Hills, California
G	5	Jacob Beccles	6 ft 3 in (1.91 m)	178 lb (81 kg)	Fr	Philadelphia, Pennsylvania
F	10	Hayden Franson	6 ft 8 in (2.03 m)	218 lb (99 kg)	Jr	American Fork, Utah
G	11	Adam Tsang Hinton	6 ft 5 in (1.96 m)	213 lb (97 kg)	So	Studio City, California
F	12	AK Okereke	6 ft 7 in (2.01 m)	225 lb (102 kg)	So	Clovis, California
G	13	Isaiah Gray	6 ft 3 in (1.91 m)	219 lb (99 kg)	Sr	Brooklyn, New York
G	14	Darius Ervin	5 ft 8 in (1.73 m)	170 lb (77 kg)	Sr	Brooklyn, New York
F	15	Keller Boothby	6 ft 7 in (2.01 m)	223 lb (101 kg)	Sr	Plano, Texas
F	20	Sean Hansen	6 ft 9 in (2.06 m)	246 lb (112 kg)	Sr	Ramsey, New Jersey
F	21	Guy Ragland Jr.	6 ft 8 in (2.03 m)	246 lb (112 kg)	Jr	West Hartford, Connecticut
G	22	Jake Fiegen	6 ft 4 in (1.93 m)	205 lb (93 kg)	Fr	Wilmette, Illinois
F	23	DJ Nix	6 ft 6 in (1.98 m)	216 lb (98 kg)	So	Harrisburg, North Carolina
G	24	Josh Baldwin	6 ft 5 in (1.96 m)	235 lb (107 kg)	So	Everett, Massachusetts
G	25	Max Watson	6 ft 4 in (1.93 m)	195 lb (88 kg)	Sr	Brigham City, Utah
G	30	Chris Mañon	6 ft 5 in (1.96 m)	209 lb (95 kg)	Sr	New Milford, New Jersey
G	31	Cooper Noard	6 ft 2 in (1.88 m)	190 lb (86 kg)	So	Glenview, Illinois
F	33	Chris Cain	6 ft 8 in (2.03 m)	223 lb (101 kg)	Jr	Middletown, New York

Head coach

- Brian Earl (Princeton)

Assistant coach(es)

- Jon Jaques (Cornell)
- Max Ginsberg (Cornell)
- Jalen Hayes (Drexel)

Legend

- (C) Team captain
- (S) Suspended
- (I) Ineligible
- (W) Walk-on
- Injured
- Current redshirt

Roster
Last update: November 15, 2023

=== Per-Game Leaders ===
- Points: Chris Manon (12.5)
- Rebounds: Guy Ragland Jr. (5.2)
- Assists: Nazir Williams (3.2)
- Blocks: Guy Ragland Jr. (0.6)
- Steals: Chris Manon (2.2)

== Schedule and results ==
Date time, TV	Rank^{#}	Opponent^{#}	Result	Record	Site (attendance) city, state
Regular season
November 6, 2023*; 7:30 pm, ESPN+		at Lehigh	W 84–78	1–0	Stabler Arena (1,065); Bethlehem, PA
November 8, 2023*; 7:00 pm, ESPN+		SUNY Morrisville	W 107–86	2–0	Newman Arena (441); Ithaca, NY
November 11, 2023*; 1:00 pm, ESPN+		at Fordham	W 78–73	3–0	Rose Hill Gymnasium (847); Bronx, NY
November 15, 2023*; 7:30 pm, ESPN+		at George Mason; Jacksonville Classic campus site game	L 83–90	3–1	EagleBank Arena (2,976); Fairfax, VA
November 19, 2023*; 2:30 pm		vs. Cal State Fullerton; Jacksonville Classic Bay semifinals	W 88–70	4–1	UNF Arena (311); Jacksonville, FL
November 20, 2023*; 2:00 pm		vs. Utah Valley; Jacksonville Classic Bay championship	W 74–61	5–1	UNF Arena (348); Jacksonville, FL
November 29, 2023*; 7:00 pm, ESPN+		Monmouth	W 91–87	6–1	Newman Arena (871); Ithaca, NY
December 2, 2023*; 1:00 pm, ESPN+		at Lafayette	W 79–71	7–1	Kirby Sports Center (1,068); Easton, PA
December 5, 2023*; 8:00 pm, ACCN		at Syracuse	L 70–81	7–2	JMA Wireless Dome (19,390); Syracuse, NY
December 19, 2023*; 7:00 pm, ESPN+		at Siena	W 95–74	8–2	MVP Arena (4,902); Albany, NY
December 22, 2023*; 2:00 pm, ESPN+		at Robert Morris	W 90–85	9–2	UPMC Events Center (625); Moon Township, PA
December 30, 2023*; 4:00 pm, ESPN+		Colgate	W 77–64	10–2	Newman Arena (964); Ithaca, NY
January 2, 2024*; 7:00 pm, ESPN+		at No. 18 Baylor	L 79–98	10–3	Foster Pavilion (7,500); Waco, TX
January 9, 2024; 6:00 pm, ESPN+		Columbia	W 91–79	11–3 (1–0)	Newman Arena (1,009); Ithaca, NY
January 15, 2024; 2:00 pm, ESPN+		Penn	W 77–60	12–3 (2–0)	Newman Arena (1,462); Ithaca, NY
January 20, 2024; 2:00 pm, ESPN+		at Brown	W 84–83	13–3 (3–0)	Pizzitola Sports Center (1,012); Providence, RI
January 23, 2024*; 7:00 pm, ESPN+		Wells College	W 105–49	14–3	Newman Arena (466); Ithaca, NY
January 27, 2024; 2:00 pm, ESPN+		Princeton	W 83–68	15–3 (4–0)	Newman Arena; Ithaca, NY
February 2, 2024; 7:00 pm, ESPN+		at Dartmouth	W 56–53	16–3 (5–0)	Leede Arena (770); Hanover, NH
February 3, 2024; 7:00 pm, ESPN+		at Harvard	W 89–76	17–3 (6–0)	Lavietes Pavilion (1,636); Cambridge, MA
February 10, 2024; 2:00 pm, ESPN+		at Yale	L 78–80	17–4 (6–1)	John J. Lee Amphitheater (2,532); New Haven, CT
February 16, 2024; 7:00 pm, ESPN+		Harvard	W 75–62	18–4 (7–1)	Newman Arena; Ithaca, NY
February 17, 2024; 6:00 pm, ESPN+		Dartmouth	W 89–80	19–4 (8–1)	Newman Arena (1,703); Ithaca, NY
February 23, 2024; 7:00 pm, ESPN+		Yale	W 65–62	20–4 (9–1)	Newman Arena (3,644); Ithaca, NY
February 24, 2024; 6:00 pm, ESPN+		Brown	L 74–78	20–5 (9–2)	Newman Arena (1,864); Ithaca, NY
March 1, 2024; 8:00 pm, ESPN+		at Penn	W 87–81	21–5 (10–2)	The Palestra (1,995); Philadelphia, PA
March 2, 2024; 7:00 pm, ESPN+		at Princeton	L 77–79	21–6 (10–3)	Jadwin Gymnasium (5,409); Princeton, NJ
March 9, 2024; 2:00 pm, ESPN+		at Columbia	W 98–76	22–6 (11–3)	Levien Gymnasium (2,022); New York, NY
Ivy League Tournament
March 16, 2024; 2:00 pm, ESPNews	(3)	vs. (2) Yale; Semifinals	L 57–69	22–7	Levien Gymnasium; New York, NY
NIT
March 19, 2024; 7:00 p.m., ESPN2		at (2) Ohio State; First Round - Wake Forest Bracket	L 83–88	22–8	Value City Arena; Columbus, OH
*Non-conference game. ^{#}Rankings from AP Poll. (#) Tournament seedings in parentheses. All times are in Eastern.

== Recap and Aftermath ==
Cornell was projected to finish third in the Ivy League, according to preseason polls, and they finished right in line with the projections. It was the best finish for Cornell since winning the Ivy League and reaching the NCAA Tournament in 2010, and their first ever NIT appearance.

Due to the four-year athletic eligibility limit of the Ivy League, seniors are not allowed to play another year. This led to the departure of Isaiah Gray to Akron, Chris Manon to Vanderbilt, Sean Hansen to George Washington, and Keller Bootby following head coach Brian Earl to William & Mary. All of these players averaged at least 15 minutes a game for the Big Red in the 2023-24 college basketball season.
