= 2023–24 Princeton Tigers men's basketball team =

American college basketball season

2023–24 Princeton Tigers men's basketball

Ivy League regular season champions

NIT, First Round
- Conference: Ivy League
- Record: 24–5 (12–2 Ivy)
- Head coach: Mitch Henderson (12th season)
- Associate head coach: Brett MacConnell
- Assistant coaches: Luke Gore; Lawrence Rowley
- Home arena: Jadwin Gymnasium

2023–24 Ivy League men's basketball standings
	Conf.				Overall
Team	W		L	PCT	W		L	PCT
Princeton	12	–	2	.857	24	–	5	.828
Yale †	11	–	3	.786	23	–	10	.697
Cornell	11	–	3	.786	22	–	8	.733
Brown	8	–	6	.571	13	–	18	.419
Harvard	5	–	9	.357	14	–	13	.519
Columbia	4	–	10	.286	13	–	14	.481
Penn	3	–	11	.214	11	–	18	.379
Dartmouth	2	–	12	.143	6	–	21	.222
† 2024 Ivy League tournament winner

The 2023–24 Princeton Tigers men's basketball team represented Princeton University during the 2023–24 NCAA Division I men's basketball season. The Tigers, led by 12th-year head coach Mitch Henderson, played their home games at Jadwin Gymnasium in Princeton, New Jersey as members of the Ivy League.

== Previous season ==
The Tigers finished the 2022–23 season 23–9, 10–4 in Ivy League play to finish as Ivy League regular season co-champions. In the Ivy League tournament, they defeated Penn in the semifinals and Yale in the championship game, earning the Ivy League's automatic bid into the NCAA tournament. In the NCAA tournament, they received the #15 seed in the South Region. In the first round, they upset #2 seed Arizona, earning the Tigers their first NCAA tournament win since 1998. In the second round, they continued their winning ways, upsetting #7 seed Missouri, marking the 3rd consecutive tournament, and 4th overall, that a #15 seed advanced to the Sweet Sixteen. That's where their run would end, losing to Creighton.

== Roster ==
2023–24 Princeton Tigers men's basketball team
Players
Coaches

Pos.	#	Name	Height	Weight	Year	Hometown
G	0	Ryan Duncan	6 ft 3 in (1.91 m)	185 lb (84 kg)	Fr	Chicago, Illinois
G	1	Xaivian Lee	6 ft 3 in (1.91 m)	171 lb (78 kg)	So	Toronto, Canada
F	3	Caden Pierce	6 ft 7 in (2.01 m)	220 lb (100 kg)	So	Glen Ellyn, Illinois
G	5	Jack Scott	6 ft 6 in (1.98 m)	199 lb (90 kg)	So	Pelican Island, New Jersey
G/F	10	Derek Sangster	6 ft 8 in (2.03 m)	197 lb (89 kg)	Fr	Sunnyvale, California
G	11	Darius Gakwasi	6 ft 6 in (1.98 m)	195 lb (88 kg)	Jr	Portland, Oregon
F	12	Jacob Huggins	6 ft 8 in (2.03 m)	210 lb (95 kg)	Fr	Oak Park, California
G	13	Deven Austin	6 ft 6 in (1.98 m)	195 lb (88 kg)	So	Vernon, Connecticut
G	14	Matt Allocco	6 ft 4 in (1.93 m)	197 lb (89 kg)	Sr	Hilliard, Ohio
G	21	Jackson Hicke	6 ft 5 in (1.96 m)	200 lb (91 kg)	Fr	Radnor, Pennsylvania
G	22	Dalen Davis	6 ft 0 in (1.83 m)	196 lb (89 kg)	Fr	Chicago, Illinois
G	24	Blake Peters	6 ft 1 in (1.85 m)	197 lb (89 kg)	Jr	Evanston, Illinois
F	33	Vernon Collins	6 ft 10 in (2.08 m)	224 lb (102 kg)	So	Chocowinity, North Carolina
F	43	Philip Byriel	6 ft 9 in (2.06 m)	225 lb (102 kg)	Jr	Drums, Pennsylvania
F	54	Zach Martini	6 ft 7 in (2.01 m)	235 lb (107 kg)	Sr	Warren, New Jersey

Head coach

- Mitch Henderson (Princeton)

Assistant coach(es)

- Brett MacConnell (Rutgers)
- Luke Gore (Bethel (IN))
- Lawrence Rowley (Emory)

Legend

- (C) Team captain
- (S) Suspended
- (I) Ineligible
- (W) Walk-on
- Injured
- Current redshirt

Roster
Last update: October 24, 2023

== Schedule and results ==
Date time, TV	Rank^{#}	Opponent^{#}	Result	Record	Site (attendance) city, state
Non-conference regular season
November 6, 2023*; 7:00 pm, Peacock		vs. Rutgers; Rivalry	W 68–61	1–0	CURE Insurance Arena (6,103); Trenton, NJ
November 10, 2023*; 7:00 pm, FloHoops		at Hofstra	W 74–67	2–0	Mack Sports Complex (3,217); Hempstead, NY
November 15, 2023*; 7:00 pm, ESPN+		at Duquesne	W 70–67	3–0	UPMC Cooper Fieldhouse (2,877); Pittsburgh, PA
November 18, 2023*; 2:00 pm, FloHoops		at Monmouth	W 82–57	4–0	OceanFirst Bank Center (2,656); West Long Branch, NJ
November 22, 2023*; 4:00 pm, ESPN+		at Old Dominion	W 76–56	5–0	Chartway Arena (4,651); Norfolk, VA
November 25, 2023*; 2:00 pm, ESPN+		Northeastern	W 80–66	6–0	Jadwin Gymnasium (2,470); Princeton, NJ
November 29, 2023*; 7:00 pm, ESPN+		at Bucknell	W 85–71	7–0	Sojka Pavilion (834); Lewisburg, PA
December 2, 2023*; 2:00 pm, ESPN+		Furman	W 70–69	8–0	Jadwin Gymnasium (2,142); Princeton, NJ
December 5, 2023*; 7:00 pm, ESPN+		Drexel	W 81–70	9–0	Jadwin Gymnasium (1,478); Princeton, NJ
December 10, 2023*; 1:00 pm, ESPN+		at Saint Joseph's	L 70–74	9–1	Hagan Arena (3,004); Philadelphia, PA
December 13, 2023*; 4:00 pm, ESPN+		Bryn Athyn	W 92–40	10–1	Jadwin Gymnasium (995); Princeton, NJ
December 22, 2023*; 7:00 pm, ESPN+		Delaware Valley	W 84–53	11–1	Jadwin Gymnasium (1,331); Princeton, NJ
December 30, 2023*; 2:00 pm, FloHoops		at Delaware	W 84–82	12–1	Bob Carpenter Center (3,340); Newark, DE
Ivy League regular season
January 6, 2024; 2:00 pm, ESPN+		Harvard	W 89–58	13–1 (1–0)	Jadwin Gymnasium (4,831); Princeton, NJ
January 15, 2024; 2:00 pm, ESPN+		Dartmouth	W 76–58	14–1 (2–0)	Jadwin Gymnasium (3,872); Princeton, NJ
January 20, 2024; 2:00 pm, ESPN+		at Columbia	W 70–62	15–1 (3–0)	Levien Gymnasium (2,307); New York, NY
January 27, 2024; 2:00 pm, ESPN+		at Cornell	L 68–83	15–2 (3–1)	Newman Arena; Ithaca, NY
February 2, 2024; 7:00 pm, ESPNU		at Yale	L 64–70	15–3 (3–2)	John J. Lee Amphitheater (2,532); New Haven, CT
February 3, 2024; 6:00 pm, ESPN+		at Brown	W 70–60	16–3 (4–2)	Pizzitola Sports Center (1,350); Providence, RI
February 10, 2024; 6:00 pm, ESPN+		Penn; Rivalry	W 77–70	17–3 (5–2)	Jadwin Gymnasium (5,290); Princeton, NJ
February 16, 2024; 7:00 pm, ESPN+		Brown	W 72–63	18–3 (6–2)	Jadwin Gymnasium (2,533); Princeton, NJ
February 17, 2024; 7:00 pm, ESPN2/ESPN+		Yale	W 73–62	19–3 (7–2)	Jadwin Gymnasium (4,358); Princeton, NJ
February 23, 2024; 7:00 pm, ESPN+		at Harvard	W 66–53	20–3 (8–2)	Lavietes Pavilion (1,636); Cambridge, MA
February 24, 2024; 7:00 pm, ESPN+		at Dartmouth	W 68–56	21–3 (9–2)	Leede Arena (937); Hanover, NH
March 1, 2024; 8:00 pm, ESPN+		Columbia	W 84–70	22–3 (10–2)	Jadwin Gymnasium (2,712); Princeton, NJ
March 2, 2024; 7:00 pm, ESPN+		Cornell	W 79–77	23–3 (11–2)	Jadwin Gymnasium (5,409); Princeton, NJ
March 9, 2024; 6:00 pm, ESPN+		at Penn; Rivalry	W 105–83	24–3 (12–2)	The Palestra (4,488); Philadelphia, PA
Ivy League tournament
March 16, 2024; 11:00 am, ESPNU	(1)	vs. (4) Brown; Semifinals	L 81–90	24–4	Levien Gymnasium; New York, NY
NIT
March 20, 2024; 8:00 pm, ESPN+	(2)	UNLV; First Round - Seton Hall Bracket	L 77–84	24–5	Jadwin Gymnasium (1,708); Princeton, NJ
*Non-conference game. ^{#}Rankings from AP Poll. (#) Tournament seedings in parentheses. All times are in Eastern.
