= Danny Wolf =

American-Israeli basketball player (born 2004)

Danny Wolf דניאל וולף
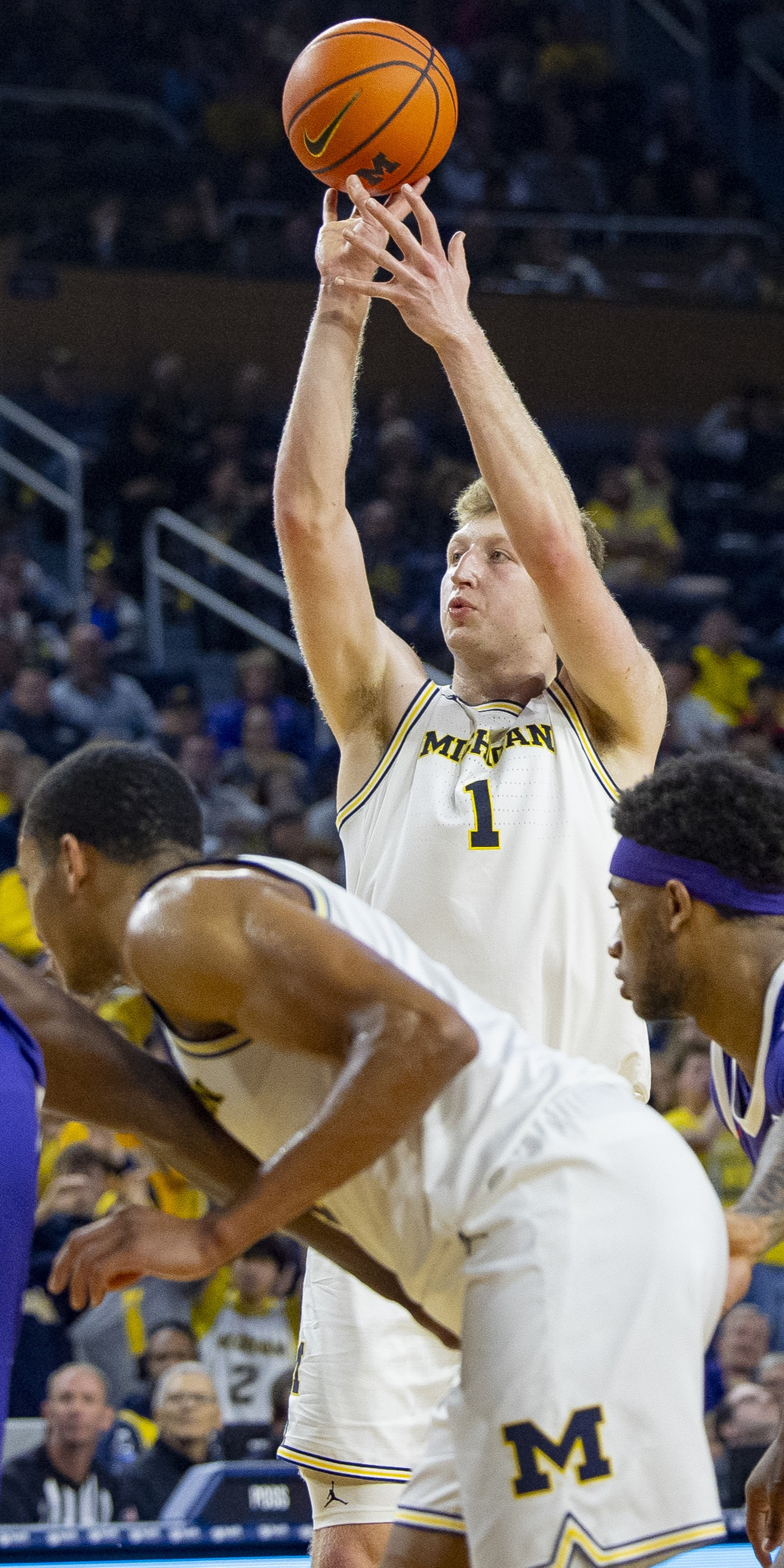
- Wolf for the 2024–25 Michigan Wolverines

No. 2 – Brooklyn Nets
- Position: Power forward
- League: NBA

Personal information
- Born: May 5, 2004 (age 22) Glencoe, Illinois, U.S.
- Listed height: 6 ft 11 in (2.11 m)
- Listed weight: 256 lb (116 kg)

Career information
- High school: Lake Forest Academy (Lake Forest, Illinois); Northfield Mount Hermon (Gill, Massachusetts)
- College: Yale (2022–2024); Michigan (2024–2025)
- NBA draft: 2025: 1st round, 27th overall pick
- Drafted by: Brooklyn Nets
- Playing career: 2025–present

Career history
- 2025–present: Brooklyn Nets
- 2025: →Long Island Nets

Career highlights
- Second-team All-Big Ten (2025); First-team All-Ivy League (2024); Ivy League tournament MVP (2024)
- Stats at NBA.com
- Stats at Basketball Reference
Medals
Men's basketball
Representing Israel
FIBA U20 European Championship
Silver medal – second place	2023 Greece	Team

Daniel Abraham Wolf (born May 5, 2004) is an American-Israeli professional basketball player for the Brooklyn Nets of the National Basketball Association (NBA). He played college basketball for the Yale Bulldogs and the Michigan Wolverines. At Yale in 2024, he earned first-team All-Ivy League honors, the Ivy League tournament MVP, and led the league in rebounds and blocks per game. At Michigan in 2025, he was a second-team All-Big Ten selection, leading the conference in rebounds per game and double-doubles. He competed for Israel at the 2023 FIBA U20 European Championship, winning a silver medal and earning all-tournament team honors. Wolf was selected 27th overall by the Nets in the first round of the 2025 NBA draft.

== Early and personal life ==
Wolf was born in Glencoe, Illinois, in the United States, and is Jewish. His oldest brother, Josh, played basketball at Lehigh University, and his other older brother, Jake, played basketball at Washington University in St. Louis. His father Joe (who played high school basketball) is 6 ft 8 in (2.03 m), his mother Tina (who played high school tennis) is 5 ft 10 in (1.78 m), and each of his two brothers are 6 ft 10 in (2.08 m). Danny is 7 feet (2.13 m) tall and weighs 250 pounds (113 kg). He studied at a Solomon Schechter Jewish day school until fifth grade, keeps kosher, and celebrated his bar mitzvah at the Western Wall in Jerusalem, Israel.

== High school career ==
Wolf attended Lake Forest Academy in Illinois for three years, where at the start of his freshman season he was 6-foot-3 and played on the varsity basketball team. He then transferred to Northfield Mount Hermon School in Massachusetts for his senior year, where he helped the team reach the finals in both the NEPSAC Triple-A championship and the national prep championship. Under his leadership, the team was ranked number 11 in the country for the majority of the season. Additionally, he received a McDonald's All-American Game nomination, and was a three-star recruit. He committed to playing college basketball for Yale because of the elite combination of academics and basketball that the school provided.

== College career ==
=== Yale ===
In his freshman season at Yale University, 2022–23, Wolf primarily played for the Bulldogs as a backup to forwards EJ Jarvis, Isaiah Kelly, and Matt Knowling, averaging 2.6 points, 2.1 rebounds, and 0.4 blocks. After the season, he received Yale's John C. Cobb Award, which is given to the team's rookie of the year.

At the start of his sophomore season, 2023–24, Wolf moved into a starting role and became the focal point of the Bulldogs’ offense. On November 19, 2023, he posted then-career-highs of 21 points, 11 rebounds, and four assists in an overtime win over Gardner-Webb University. Wolf's play earned him the Ivy League Player of the Week five times, including three straight from January 23, 2024, to February 12. During that stretch, he averaged 17.6 points, 10.0 rebounds, 1.2 assists, and 0.8 blocks, leading the Bulldogs to an undefeated record during the span. Wolf became just the seventh player in Ivy League history to earn five Player of the Week awards in a single season.

In 2023–24, Wolf led the Ivy League with 310 rebounds, 247 defensive rebounds, 9.7 rebounds per game, and 1.3 blocks per game. He finished the year averaging 14.1 points per game (10th in the league), with 43 blocks (second), 63 offensive rebounds (third), 176 field goals (third), a .472 field goal percentage (fourth), and 33 steals (tenth). He earned unanimous first team All-Ivy honors, a National Association of Basketball Coaches District 13 first-team selection, was named the most outstanding player in the Ivy League tournament, and was named Academic All-District.

=== Michigan ===
On April 20, 2024, Wolf transferred to the University of Michigan to play for the Wolverines in the Big Ten Conference. On November 4, 2024, in his first game with Michigan, against Cleveland State, Wolf led all players with 19 points and 13 rebounds, while adding three blocks, three steals, and two assists. In the seventh game of the season, against Xavier, he had his third double-double of the season, leading all players with 20 points and 14 rebounds as Michigan became the Fort Myers Tip-Off champions. In the next game, against Wisconsin, Wolf scored 20 points, grabbed a team-high seven rebounds, and recorded a game-high five assists, three steals, and five blocked shots. On January 4, 2025, against USC, he had 21 points, 13 rebounds, seven assists, and a career-high six blocks, earning his seventh double-double of the season. On January 16 against Minnesota, Wolf scored a season-high 23 points with ten rebounds and seven assists; his eighth double-double with Michigan. On February 5 against Oregon, he had 15 points and 12 rebounds, leading all Big Ten players with ten double-doubles through 22 games.

In March, Wolf was named a finalist for the Karl Malone Award, given to the nation's best power forward each season. He also earned second-team All-Big Ten honors, selected by both the coaches and media, and was named to the all-tournament team after leading Michigan to a Big Ten championship in the 2025 Big Ten tournament. In the 2025 NCAA tournament, Wolf was named to the south regional all-tournament team, along with Johni Broome, Tahaad Pettiford, Jase Richardson, and Sean Pedulla.

As a junior, Wolf averaged 13.2 points, 9.7 rebounds (leading the conference), 3.6 assists, and 1.4 blocks (7th) per game, with a .497 field goal percentage (9th). He led the Big Ten in rebounding (360 rebounds; 8th in the NCAA) and in double-doubles, finishing in a tie with Julian Reese and Derik Queen with 15 double-doubles.

On April 16, Wolf announced that he would forgo his senior season and declared for the 2025 NBA draft.

== Professional career ==
On June 25, 2025, Wolf was selected 27th overall by the Brooklyn Nets in the first round of the 2025 NBA draft. He was Yale's first first round selection since Tony Lavelli went 4th in the 1949 BAA draft and first draft pick since Miye Oni was the 58th overall selection in the 2019 NBA draft. He was one of five first round selection by the Nets in the 2025 draft. Wolf made his NBA debut on November 3 against the Minnesota Timberwolves. On November 7, he debuted for the Long Island Nets of the NBA G League with 15 points, 11 rebounds, two steals, and two blocks in the team's season opener against the Capital City Go-Go. In Wolf's fifth NBA game on November 29 against the Milwaukee Bucks, he posted a career high 22 points (including 5–9 on three point shots). He also had four rebounds, four assists, and a block. In his previous four performances, Wolf had totaled seven points, seven rebounds, and three assists. His expanded role was possible in the absence of Michael Porter Jr. Wolf earned a spot in the rotation with surprisingly versatile play. On January 11, he posted a career-high 10 rebounds and 11 points for his first career double-double in a start during a loss to the Memphis Grizzlies. On March 1, Wolf posted a career-high 23 points and 9 rebounds against the Cleveland Cavaliers. He made 57 total appearances (including 15 starts) for Brooklyn during his rookie season, averaging 8.9 points, 4.9 rebounds, and 2.2 assists. On April 3, Wolf was ruled out for the remainder of the season due to a left ankle sprain he suffered in a loss to the Sacramento Kings on March 22.

== National team career ==
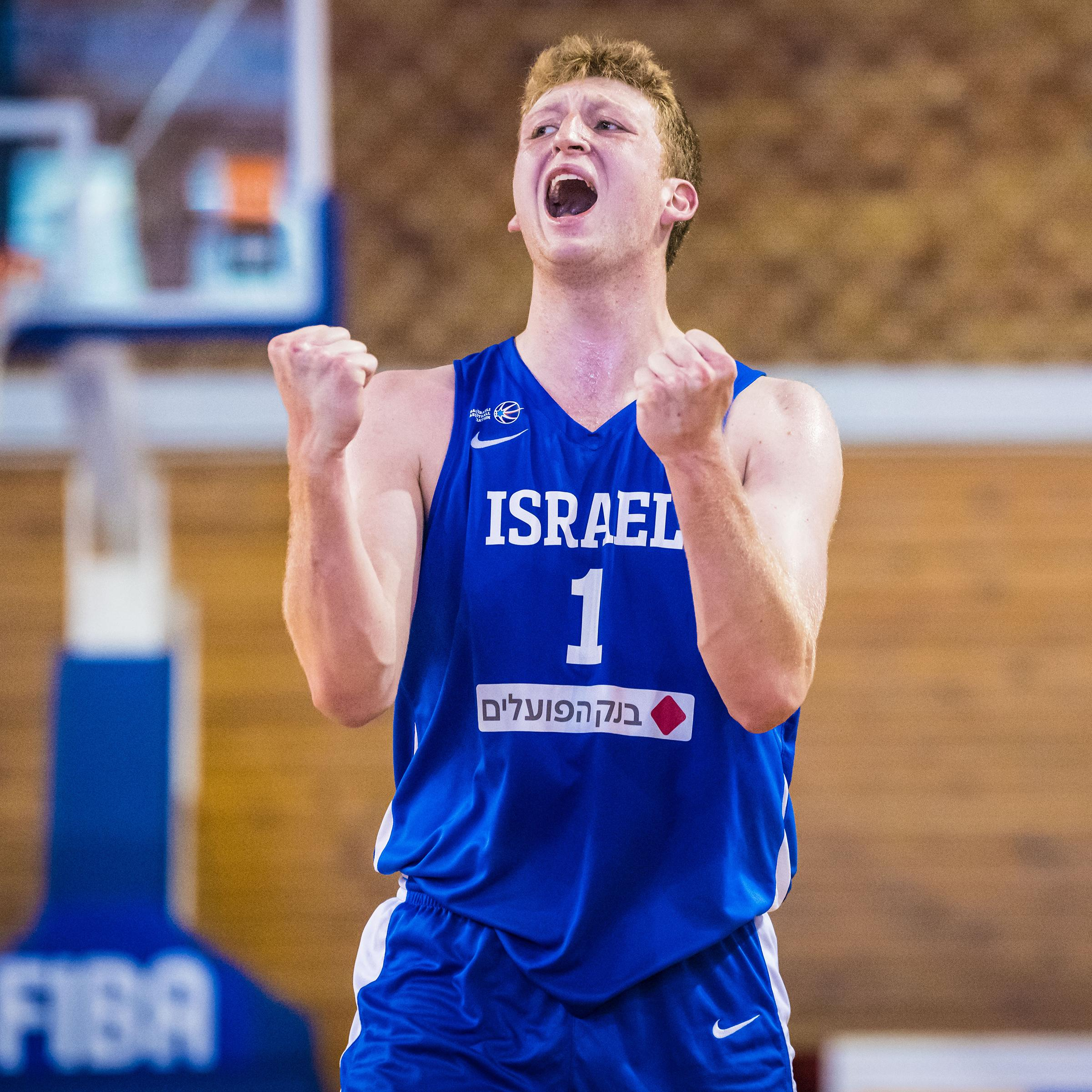
Wolf with Israel's under-20 national team in 2023

While born in the United States, because Wolf is Jewish he was able to become an Israeli naturalized citizen, and thus to compete for Team Israel. In his first international competition, Wolf represented Israel at the 2023 FIBA U20 European Championship in Greece. He averaged 17.7 points (second in the tournament), a tournament-high 12 rebounds, 2.7 assists and 1.3 blocks per game (ninth), leading Israel to a silver medal. Wolf was named to the all-tournament team.

== Career statistics ==
Legend
GP	Games played	GS	Games started	MPG	Minutes per game
FG%	Field goal percentage	3P%	3-point field goal percentage	FT%	Free throw percentage
RPG	Rebounds per game	APG	Assists per game	SPG	Steals per game
BPG	Blocks per game	PPG	Points per game	**Bold**	Career high

=== NBA ===
Year	Team	GP	GS	MPG	FG%	3P%	FT%	RPG	APG	SPG	BPG	PPG
2025–26	Brooklyn	57	15	20.8	.405	.322	.771	4.9	2.2	.5	.6	8.9
Career		57	15	20.8	.405	.322	.771	4.9	2.2	.5	.6	8.9

=== College ===
Year	Team	GP	GS	MPG	FG%	3P%	FT%	RPG	APG	SPG	BPG	PPG
2022–23	Yale	21	0	7.3	.404	.304	.625	2.1	.6	.2	.4	2.6
2023–24	Yale	32	31	**30.8**	.472	**.345**	**.717**	**9.7**	2.4	**1.0**	1.3	**14.1**
2024–25	Michigan	**37**	**37**	30.5	**.497**	.336	.594	**9.7**	**3.6**	.7	**1.4**	13.2
Career		90	68	25.2	.479	.336	.646	7.9	2.5	.7	1.1	11.1

== See also ==
- List of Jewish basketball players
