= 2023–24 Columbia Lions men's basketball team =

Basketball team season

2023–24 Columbia Lions men's basketball
- Conference: Ivy League
- Record: 13–14 (4–10 Ivy)
- Head coach: Jim Engles (7th season)
- Assistant coaches: Tobe Carberry; Jake Brown; Austin Nisbett; Jesse Agel
- Home arena: Levien Gymnasium

2023–24 Ivy League men's basketball standings
	Conf.				Overall
Team	W		L	PCT	W		L	PCT
Princeton	12	–	2	.857	24	–	5	.828
Yale †	11	–	3	.786	23	–	10	.697
Cornell	11	–	3	.786	22	–	8	.733
Brown	8	–	6	.571	13	–	18	.419
Harvard	5	–	9	.357	14	–	13	.519
Columbia	4	–	10	.286	13	–	14	.481
Penn	3	–	11	.214	11	–	18	.379
Dartmouth	2	–	12	.143	6	–	21	.222
† 2024 Ivy League tournament winner

The 2023–24 Columbia Lions men's basketball team represented Columbia University during the 2023–24 NCAA Division I men's basketball season. The Lions, led by seventh-year head coach Jim Engles, played their home games at Levien Gymnasium in New York City as members of the Ivy League. They finished the season 13–14, 4–10 in Ivy League play to finish in sixth place. They failed to qualify for the Ivy League tournament.

== Previous season ==
The Lions finished the 2022–23 season 7–22, 2–12 in Ivy League play to finish in last place. They failed to qualify for the Ivy League tournament.

== Roster ==
2023–24 Columbia Lions men's basketball team
Players
Coaches

Pos.	#	Name	Height	Weight	Year	Hometown
G	0	Jaden Cooper	6 ft 3 in (1.91 m)	175 lb (79 kg)	Jr	Goldsboro, North Carolina
G	1	Avery Brown	6 ft 4 in (1.93 m)	185 lb (84 kg)	So	Beacon Falls, Connecticut
G	2	Kenny Noland	6 ft 4 in (1.93 m)	185 lb (84 kg)	So	Apex, North Carolina
G	3	Zavian McLean	6 ft 4 in (1.93 m)	205 lb (93 kg)	Sr	Spring Lake, North Carolina
F	4	Liam Murphy	6 ft 7 in (2.01 m)	215 lb (98 kg)	Sr	Staten Island, New York
G	5	Nicolo Romanelli	6 ft 2 in (1.88 m)	175 lb (79 kg)	Fr	Sydney, Australia
F	11	Josh Odunowo	6 ft 6 in (1.98 m)	205 lb (93 kg)	Sr	Laurel, Maryland
F	13	Blair Thompson	6 ft 7 in (2.01 m)	190 lb (86 kg)	So	New York, New York
G	15	Geronimo Rubio De La Rosa	6 ft 2 in (1.88 m)	170 lb (77 kg)	Jr	Santiago, Dominican Republic
F	20	Robbie Stankard	6 ft 9 in (2.06 m)	240 lb (109 kg)	Jr	Westwood, Massachusetts
F	22	Richard Nweke	6 ft 8 in (2.03 m)	220 lb (100 kg)	Fr	Anambra, Nigeria
F	23	Zine Eddine Bedri	6 ft 10 in (2.08 m)	225 lb (102 kg)	So	Tébessa, Algeria
F	24	Arop Arop	6 ft 11 in (2.11 m)	185 lb (84 kg)	Fr	Fort Worth, Texas
F/C	34	Jake Tavroff	6 ft 9 in (2.06 m)	245 lb (111 kg)	Jr	Oceanside, New York
F	35	Noah Robledo	6 ft 5 in (1.96 m)	205 lb (93 kg)	Jr	Leander, Texas

Head coach

- Jim Engles (Dickinson)

Assistant coach(es)

- Tobe Carberry (Vermont)
- Jake Brown (Middlebury)
- Austin Nisbett (Duke)
- Jesse Agel (Vermont)

Legend

- (C) Team captain
- (S) Suspended
- (I) Ineligible
- (W) Walk-on
- Injured
- Current redshirt

Roster
Last update: October 23, 2023

== Schedule and results ==
Date time, TV	Rank^{#}	Opponent^{#}	Result	Record	Site (attendance) city, state
Non-conference regular season
November 6, 2023*; 7:00 pm, FS1		at Providence	L 59–78	0–1	Amica Mutual Pavilion (11,069); Providence, RI
November 11, 2023*; 7:00 pm, ESPN+/SNY		Albany	L 75–78	0–2	Levien Gymnasium (761); New York, NY
November 12, 2023*; 6:00 pm, ESPN+		Bard	W 86–36	1–2	Levien Gymnasium (551); New York, NY
November 15, 2023*; 7:00 pm, ESPN+		SUNY Delhi	W 105–60	2–2	Levien Gymnasium (617); New York, NY
November 18, 2023*; 2:00 pm, ESPN+		at Temple	W 78–73	3–2	Liacouras Center (2,957); Philadelphia, PA
November 21, 2023*; 7:00 pm, ESPN+/SNY		LIU	W 77–67	4–2	Levien Gymnasium (622); New York, NY
November 25, 2023*; 1:00 pm, ESPN+		Maine	W 75–56	5–2	Levien Gymnasium (898); New York, NY
November 29, 2023*; 7:00 pm, ESPN+		Loyola (MD)	W 69–57	6–2	Levien Gymnasium (599); New York, NY
December 3, 2023*; 12:00 pm, ESPN+		at New Hampshire	L 71–80	6–3	Lundholm Gym (421); Durham, NH
December 5, 2023*; 7:00 pm, ESPN+		Lafayette	W 83–72	7–3	Levien Gymnasium (567); New York, NY
December 11, 2023*; 7:00 pm, NEC Front Row		at Fairleigh Dickinson	W 87–83	8–3	Rothman Center (582); Hackensack, NJ
December 30, 2023*; 1:00 pm		at Fordham	L 78–87	8–4	Rose Hill Gymnasium (1,969); Bronx, NY
January 4, 2024*; 7:00 pm, ESPN+		Mount Saint Vincent	W 120–52	9–4	Levien Gymnasium (673); New York, NY
Ivy League regular season
January 9, 2024; 6:00 pm, ESPN+		at Cornell	L 79–91	9–5 (0–1)	Newman Arena (1,009); Ithaca, NY
January 15, 2024; 7:00 pm, ESPN+		at Yale	L 70–89	9–6 (0–2)	John J. Lee Amphitheater (1,845); New Haven, CT
January 20, 2024; 2:00 pm, ESPN+		Princeton	L 62–70	9–7 (0–3)	Levien Gymnasium (2,307); New York, NY
January 27, 2024; 2:00 pm, ESPN+		Penn	W 84–81	10–7 (1–3)	Levien Gymnasium (2,076); New York, NY
February 2, 2024; 7:00 pm, ESPN+		at Harvard	L 59–62	10–8 (1–4)	Lavietes Pavilion (1,536); Cambridge, MA
February 3, 2024; 6:00 pm, ESPN+		at Dartmouth	W 72–56	11–8 (2–4)	Leede Arena (992); Hanover, NH
February 10, 2024; 2:00 pm, ESPN+		at Brown	W 83–69	12–8 (3–4)	Pizzitola Sports Center (897); Providence, RI
February 16, 2024; 7:00 pm, ESPN+		Dartmouth	W 73–63	13–8 (4–4)	Levien Gymnasium (1,152); New York, NY
February 17, 2024; 6:00 pm, ESPN+		Harvard	L 75–80	13–9 (4–5)	Levien Gymnasium (2,257); New York, NY
February 23, 2024; 7:00 pm, ESPN+		Brown	L 64–66	13–10 (4–6)	Levien Gymnasium (1,203); New York, NY
February 24, 2024; 6:00 pm, ESPN+		Yale	L 76–84	13–11 (4–7)	Levien Gymnasium (1,397); New York, NY
March 1, 2024; 8:00 pm, ESPN+		at Princeton	L 70–84	13–12 (4–8)	Jadwin Gymnasium (2,712); Princeton, NJ
March 2, 2024; 7:00 pm, ESPN+		at Penn	L 72–84	13–13 (4–9)	The Palestra (1,488); Philadelphia, PA
March 9, 2024; 2:00 pm, ESPN+		Cornell	L 76–98	13–14 (4–10)	Levien Gymnasium (2,022); New York, NY
*Non-conference game. ^{#}Rankings from AP Poll. (#) Tournament seedings in parentheses. All times are in Eastern Time.

== See also ==
- 2023–24 Columbia Lions women's basketball team
