= 2023–24 Dartmouth Big Green men's basketball team =

American college basketball season

2023–24 Dartmouth Big Green men's basketball
- Conference: Ivy League
- Record: 6–21 (2–12 Ivy)
- Head coach: David McLaughlin (7th season)
- Assistant coaches: Jabari Trotter; Josh Einhorn; Braeden Estes
- Home arena: Leede Arena

2023–24 Ivy League men's basketball standings
	Conf.				Overall
Team	W		L	PCT	W		L	PCT
Princeton	12	–	2	.857	24	–	5	.828
Yale †	11	–	3	.786	23	–	10	.697
Cornell	11	–	3	.786	22	–	8	.733
Brown	8	–	6	.571	13	–	18	.419
Harvard	5	–	9	.357	14	–	13	.519
Columbia	4	–	10	.286	13	–	14	.481
Penn	3	–	11	.214	11	–	18	.379
Dartmouth	2	–	12	.143	6	–	21	.222
† 2024 Ivy League tournament winner

The 2023–24 Dartmouth Big Green men's basketball team represented Dartmouth College during the 2023–24 NCAA Division I men's basketball season. The Big Green, led by seventh-year head coach David McLaughlin, played their home games at Leede Arena in Hanover, New Hampshire as members of the Ivy League. They finished the season 6–21, 2–12 in Ivy League play, to finish in last place. They failed to qualify for the Ivy League tournament.

== Previous season ==
The Big Green finished the 2022–23 season 10–18, 6–8 in Ivy League play, to finish in sixth place. They failed to qualify for the Ivy League tournament.

== Roster ==
2023–24 Dartmouth Big Green men's basketball team
Players
Coaches

Pos.	#	Name	Height	Weight	Year	Hometown
G	0	Ben Brown	6 ft 2 in (1.88 m)	198 lb (90 kg)	Fr	Manchester, England
F	1	Patrick Jr. Tivnan	6 ft 8 in (2.03 m)	210 lb (95 kg)	Fr	Charlotte, NC
F	2	Cade Haskins	6 ft 6 in (1.98 m)	200 lb (91 kg)	Jr	Minneapolis, MN
F	3	Dusan Neskovic	6 ft 8 in (2.03 m)	205 lb (93 kg)	Sr	Banja Luka, Bosnia and Herzegovina
G	4	Izaiah Robinson	6 ft 3 in (1.91 m)	200 lb (91 kg)	Sr	Montclair, NJ
G	5	Jaren Johnson	6 ft 5 in (1.96 m)	185 lb (84 kg)	Sr	Lynwood, CA
G	10	Ryan Cornish	6 ft 4 in (1.93 m)	170 lb (77 kg)	Jr	Potomac, MD
F	11	Connor Christensen	6 ft 6 in (1.98 m)	215 lb (98 kg)	Jr	Eden Prairie, MN
F	15	Nikola Dimitrijevic	6 ft 10 in (2.08 m)	225 lb (102 kg)	Jr	Belgrade, Serbia
G	20	Romeo Myrthil	6 ft 2 in (1.88 m)	185 lb (84 kg)	Jr	Solna, Sweden
F	21	Brandon Mitchell-Day	6 ft 8 in (2.03 m)	205 lb (93 kg)	So	St. Louis, MO
F	22	Jayden Williams	6 ft 6 in (1.98 m)	185 lb (84 kg)	So	Windermere, FL
G	23	Robert III McRae	6 ft 3 in (1.91 m)	200 lb (91 kg)	Sr	Inglewood, CA
G	22	Niko Abusara	6 ft 5 in (1.96 m)	185 lb (84 kg)	Fr	Chicago, IL
F	33	Jackson Munro	6 ft 8 in (2.03 m)	220 lb (100 kg)	So	Wilmette, IL

Head coach

- David McLaughlin (Colby)

Assistant coach(es)

- Jabari Trotter (Dartmouth)
- Josh Einhorn (Pittsburgh)
- Braeden Estes (New Hampshire)

Legend

- (C) Team captain
- (S) Suspended
- (I) Ineligible
- (W) Walk-on
- Injured
- Current redshirt

Roster
Last update: October 27, 2023

== Schedule and results ==
Date time, TV	Rank^{#}	Opponent^{#}	Result	Record	Site (attendance) city, state
Non-conference regular season
November 6, 2023*; 9:00 p.m., ACCN		at No. 2 Duke	L 54–92	0–1	Cameron Indoor Stadium (9,314); Durham, NC
November 10, 2023*; 6:00 p.m., ESPN+		UMass Lowell	L 48–81	0–2	Leede Arena (637); Hanover, NH
November 15, 2023*; 7:00 p.m., ESPN+		Westfield State	W 79–61	1–2	Leede Arena (423); Hanover, NH
November 25, 2023*; 8:00 p.m., ESPN+		at Saint Louis	L 65–66	1–3	Chaifetz Arena (4,523); St. Louis, MO
November 29, 2023*; 7:00 p.m., ESPN+		at Vermont	L 53–64	1–4	Patrick Gym (2,080); Burlington, VT
December 2, 2023*; 5:00 p.m., ESPN+		at Albany	L 68–73	1–5	Broadview Center (2,075); Albany, NY
December 6, 2023*; 7:00 p.m., ESPN+		New Hampshire; Rivalry	W 76–64	2–5	Leede Arena (519); Hanover, NH
December 9, 2023*; 4:00 p.m., ESPN+		Marist	L 53–63	2–6	Leede Arena (619); Hanover, NH
December 13, 2023*; 7:00 p.m., ESPN+		Boston University	W 63–56	3–6	Leede Arena (449); Hanover, NH
December 16, 2023*; 2:00 p.m., NEC Front Row		at Le Moyne	L 54–80	3–7	Ted Grant Court (480); DeWitt, NY
December 18, 2023*; 7:00 p.m., ESPN+		Thomas	W 77–48	4–7	Leede Arena (385); Hanover, NH
December 21, 2023*; 11:30 a.m., NEC Front Row		at Sacred Heart	L 57–67	4–8	William H. Pitt Center (2,400); Fairfield, CT
December 30, 2023*; 5:00 p.m., SECN+		at Vanderbilt	L 53–69	4–9	Memorial Gymnasium (5,773); Nashville, TN
Ivy League regular season
January 6, 2024; 2:00 p.m., ESPN+		at Penn	L 51–80	4–10 (0–1)	The Palestra (1,949); Philadelphia, PA
January 15, 2024; 2:00 p.m., ESPN+		at Princeton	L 58–76	4–11 (0–2)	Jadwin Gymnasium (3,872); Princeton, NJ
January 20, 2024; 2:00 p.m., ESPN+		Yale	L 51–76	4–12 (0–3)	Leede Arena (773); Hanover, NH
January 27, 2024; 2:00 p.m., ESPN+		Brown	W 75–71	5–12 (1–3)	Leede Arena (868); Hanover, NH
February 2, 2024; 7:00 p.m., ESPN+		Cornell	L 53–56	5–13 (1–4)	Leede Arena (770); Hanover, NH
February 3, 2024; 6:00 p.m., ESPN+		Columbia	L 56–72	5–14 (1–5)	Leede Arena (992); Hanover, NH
February 10, 2024; 2:00 p.m., ESPN+		at Harvard	L 59–77	5–15 (1–6)	Lavietes Pavilion (1,636); Cambridge, MA
February 16, 2024; 7:00 p.m., ESPN+		at Columbia	L 63–73	5–16 (1–7)	Levien Gymnasium (1,152); New York, NY
February 17, 2024; 6:00 p.m., ESPN+		at Cornell	L 80–89	5–17 (1–8)	Newman Arena (1,703); Ithaca, NY
February 23, 2024; 7:00 p.m., ESPN+		Penn	L 69–82	5–18 (1–9)	Leede Arena (733); Hanover, NH
February 24, 2024; 7:00 p.m., ESPN+		Princeton	L 56–68	5–19 (1–10)	Leede Arena (937); Hanover, NH
March 1, 2024; 7:00 p.m., ESPN+		at Yale	L 56–80	5–20 (1–11)	John J. Lee Amphitheater (1,380); New Haven, CT
March 2, 2024; 7:00 p.m., ESPN+		at Brown	L 67–89	5–21 (1–12)	Pizzitola Sports Center (1,118); Providence, RI
March 9, 2024; 2:00 p.m., ESPN+		Harvard	W 76–69	6–21 (2–12)	Leede Arena (809); Hanover, NH
*Non-conference game. ^{#}Rankings from AP poll. (#) Tournament seedings in parentheses. All times are in Eastern.
