= 2023–24 Harvard Crimson men's basketball team =

American college basketball season

2023–24 Harvard Crimson men's basketball
- Conference: Ivy League
- Record: 14–13 (5–9 Ivy)
- Head coach: Tommy Amaker (16th season)
- Assistant coaches: Mike Sotsky; Larry Farmer; Matt Fraschilla
- Home arena: Lavietes Pavilion

2023–24 Ivy League men's basketball standings
	Conf.				Overall
Team	W		L	PCT	W		L	PCT
Princeton	12	–	2	.857	24	–	5	.828
Yale †	11	–	3	.786	23	–	10	.697
Cornell	11	–	3	.786	22	–	8	.733
Brown	8	–	6	.571	13	–	18	.419
Harvard	5	–	9	.357	14	–	13	.519
Columbia	4	–	10	.286	13	–	14	.481
Penn	3	–	11	.214	11	–	18	.379
Dartmouth	2	–	12	.143	6	–	21	.222
† 2024 Ivy League tournament winner

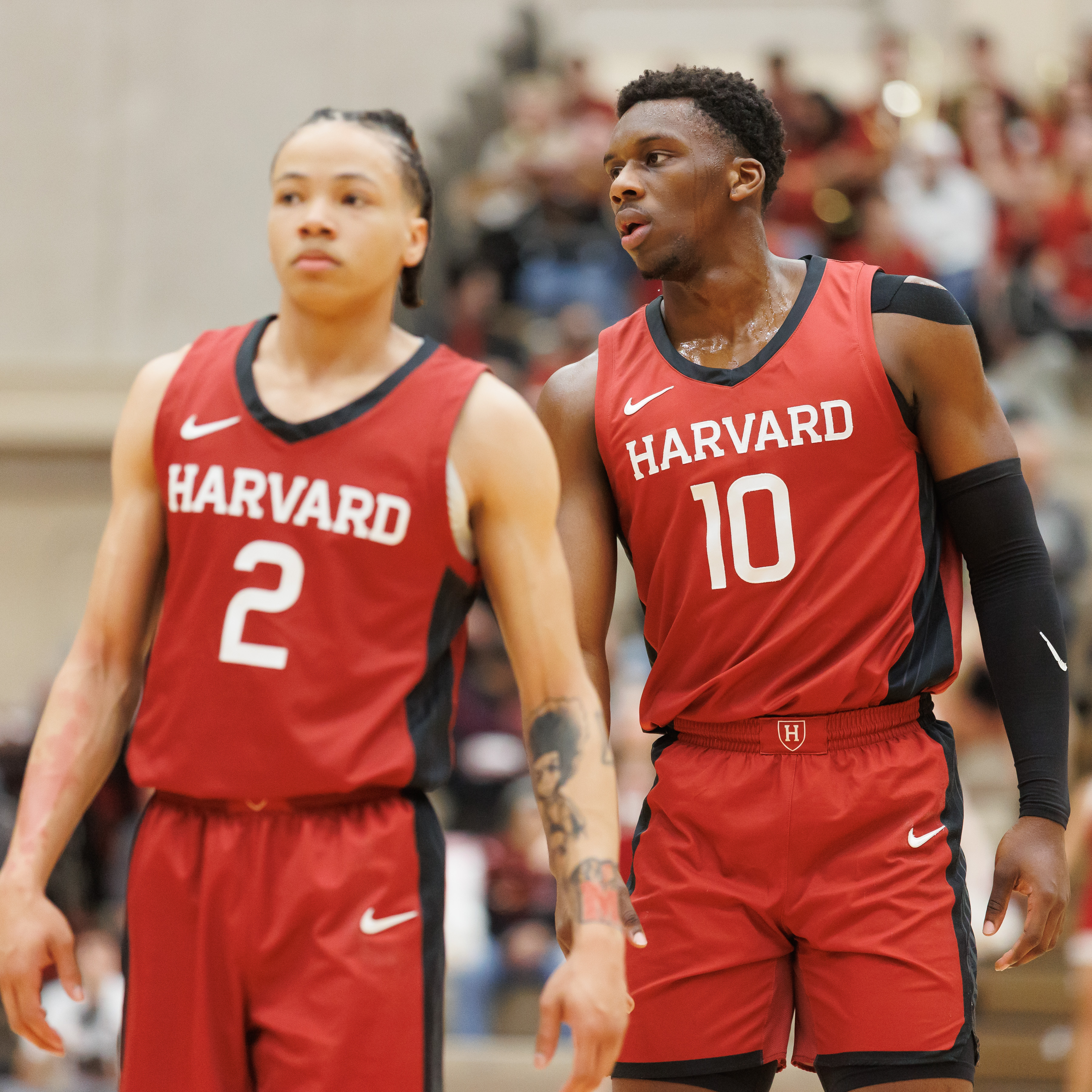
Malik Mack and Chisom Okpara

The 2023–24 Harvard Crimson men's basketball team represented Harvard University during the 2023–24 NCAA Division I men's basketball season. The Crimson, led by 16th-year head coach Tommy Amaker, played their home games at the Lavietes Pavilion located in Boston, Massachusetts as members of the Ivy League. They finished the season with a record of 14–13, 5–9 in Ivy League play, to place fifth. They failed to qualify for the Ivy League tournament.

== Previous season ==
The Crimson finished the 2022–23 season 14–14, 5–9 in Ivy League play, to place seventh. They failed to qualify for the Ivy League tournament.

== Roster ==
2023–24 Harvard Crimson men's basketball team
Players
Coaches

Pos.	#	Name	Height	Weight	Year	Previous school	Hometown
G	0	Tyler Simon	6 ft 5 in (1.96 m)	187 lb (85 kg)	Jr	Dream City Christian School	Houston, TX
F	1	Josh Hemmings	6 ft 9 in (2.06 m)	230 lb (104 kg)	Sr	Lawrenceville School	Toronto, ON
G	2	Malik Mack	6 ft 1 in (1.85 m)	170 lb (77 kg)	Fr	St. John's College High School	Oxon Hill, MD
G	3	Xavier Nesbitt	5 ft 11 in (1.8 m)	170 lb (77 kg)	Fr	University of Chicago Laboratory Schools	Chicago, IL
F	10	Chisom Okpara	6 ft 8 in (2.03 m)	225 lb (102 kg)	So	La Lumiere School	Bronxville, NY
G	11	Evan Nelson	6 ft 2 in (1.88 m)	170 lb (77 kg)	Jr	Salpointe Catholic High School	Tucson, AZ
G	13	Chandler Piggé	6 ft 5 in (1.96 m)	210 lb (95 kg)	So	Phillips Exeter Academy	Houston, TX
G	14	Greg Cooper	6 ft 0 in (1.83 m)	160 lb (73 kg)	So	Boston College High School	Cambridge, MA
F	15	Thomas Batties II	6 ft 7 in (2.01 m)	215 lb (98 kg)	Fr	Gonzaga College High School	Washington, D.C.
F	22	Justice Ajogbor	6 ft 10 in (2.08 m)	255 lb (116 kg)	Sr	Christ School	Benin City, Nigeria
G	23	Louis Lesmond	6 ft 6 in (1.98 m)	190 lb (86 kg)	Jr	Notre Dame College Prep	Paris, France
G	25	Christian Rich	6 ft 3 in (1.91 m)	190 lb (86 kg)	Sr	MIT	Holladay, UT
F	35	Luca Ace-Nasteski	6 ft 10 in (2.08 m)	225 lb (102 kg)	Fr	Scots College	Manly, Australia
F	42	Bennett Pitcher	6 ft 9 in (2.06 m)	285 lb (129 kg)	Jr	Deerfield Academy	Deerfield, MA
G	45	Payton Pitts	6 ft 2 in (1.88 m)	180 lb (82 kg)	Fr	Francis W. Parker School	Chicago, IL
C	54	Matt Filipowski	7 ft 0 in (2.13 m)	240 lb (109 kg)	So	Wilbraham & Monson Academy	Westtown, NY
G	55	Denham Wojcik	6 ft 2 in (1.88 m)	178 lb (81 kg)	Jr	Porter-Gaud School	Charleston, SC

Head coach

- Tommy Amaker (Duke)

Assistant coach(es)

- Mike Sotsky (Harvard)
- Larry Farmer (Denison)
- Matt Fraschilla (Harvard)

Legend

- (C) Team captain
- (S) Suspended
- (I) Ineligible
- (W) Walk-on
- Injured
- Current redshirt

Roster
Last update: November 9, 2023

== Schedule and results ==
Date time, TV	Rank^{#}	Opponent^{#}	Result	Record	Site (attendance) city, state
Non-conference regular season
November 6, 2023*; 7:00 pm, ESPN+		UMass Boston	W 78–50	1–0	Lavietes Pavilion (932); Boston, MA
November 10, 2023*; 8:00 pm, ESPN+		at Rice	W 89–76	2–0	Tudor Fieldhouse (2,474); Houston, TX
November 14, 2023*; 7:00 pm, ESPN+		Northeastern	W 80–56	3–0	Lavietes Pavilion (946); Boston, MA
November 17, 2023*; 7:00 pm, ESPN+/NESN+		at UMass	W 78–75 ^{OT}	4–0	Mullins Center (3,735); Amherst, MA
November 18, 2023*; 5:00 pm, ESPN+		at Boston College; Rivalry	L 64–73	4–1	Conte Forum (6,326); Chestnut Hill, MA
November 22, 2023*; 2:00 pm, ESPN+		at Colgate	W 76–70	5–1	Cotterell Court (847); Hamilton, NY
November 26, 2023*; 4:30 pm, B1G		vs. Indiana	L 76–89	5–2	Gainbridge Fieldhouse (8,469); Indianapolis, IN
November 29, 2023*; 7:00 pm, ESPN+		American	W 80–75	6–2	Lavietes Pavilion (983); Boston, MA
December 2, 2023*; 4:00 pm, ESPN+/NBCSCHI+		at Loyola–Chicago	L 53–75	6–3	Joseph J. Gentile Arena (3,754); Chicago, IL
December 8, 2023*; 7:00 pm, ESPN+		Army	W 70–64	7–3	Lavietes Pavilion (1,450); Boston, MA
December 21, 2023*; 2:00 pm, ESPN+		Holy Cross	W 74–72	8–3	Lavietes Pavilion (1,124); Boston, MA
December 30, 2023*; 2:00 pm, ESPN+		Iona	L 60–69	8–4	Lavietes Pavilion (1,636); Boston, MA
January 2, 2024*; 7:00 pm, ESPN+		Albany	W 76–71	9–4	Lavietes Pavilion (837); Boston, MA
Ivy League regular season
January 6, 2024; 2:00 pm, ESPN+		at Princeton	L 58–89	9–5 (0–1)	Jadwin Gymnasium (4,831); Princeton, NJ
January 15, 2024; 2:00 pm, ESPN+		Brown	L 72–74	9–6 (0–2)	Lavietes Pavilion (1,124); Boston, MA
January 20, 2024; 6:00 pm, ESPNU/ESPN+		at Penn	W 70–61	10–6 (1–2)	The Palestra (4,960); Philadelphia, PA
January 27, 2024; 2:00 pm, ESPN+		Yale	L 65–78	10–7 (1–3)	Lavietes Pavilion (1,636); Boston, MA
February 2, 2024; 7:00 pm, ESPN+		Columbia	W 62–59	11–7 (2–3)	Lavietes Pavilion (1,536); Boston, MA
February 3, 2024; 7:00 pm, ESPN+		Cornell	L 76–89	11–8 (2–4)	Lavietes Pavilion (1,636); Boston, MA
February 10, 2024; 2:00 pm, ESPN+		Dartmouth	W 77–59	12–8 (3–4)	Lavietes Pavilion (1,636); Boston, MA
February 16, 2024; 7:00 pm, ESPN+		at Cornell	L 62–75	12–9 (3–5)	Newman Arena; Ithaca, NY
February 17, 2024; 6:00 pm, ESPN+		at Columbia	W 80–75	13–9 (4–5)	Levien Gymnasium (2,257); New York, NY
February 23, 2024; 7:00 pm, ESPN+		Princeton	L 53–66	13–10 (4–6)	Lavietes Pavilion (1,636); Boston, MA
February 24, 2024; 7:00 pm, ESPN+		Penn	W 74–70	14–10 (5–6)	Lavietes Pavilion (1,636); Boston, MA
March 1, 2024; 7:00 pm, ESPN+		at Brown	L 68–71 ^{OT}	14–11 (5–7)	Pizzitola Sports Center (1,788); Providence, RI
March 2, 2024; 7:00 pm, ESPN+		at Yale	L 60–80	14–12 (5–8)	John J. Lee Amphitheater (2,532); New Haven, CT
March 9, 2024; 2:00 pm, ESPN+		at Dartmouth	L 69–76	14–13 (5–9)	Leede Arena (809); Hanover, NH
*Non-conference game. ^{#}Rankings from AP poll. (#) Tournament seedings in parentheses. All times are in Eastern.
