= 2023–24 Penn Quakers men's basketball team =

American college basketball season

2023–24 Penn Quakers men's basketball
- Conference: Ivy League
- Record: 11–18 (3–11 Ivy)
- Head coach: Steve Donahue (8th season)
- Associate head coach: Nat Graham
- Assistant coaches: Joe Mihalich Jr.; Kris Saulny
- Home arena: The Palestra

2023–24 Ivy League men's basketball standings
	Conf.				Overall
Team	W		L	PCT	W		L	PCT
Princeton	12	–	2	.857	24	–	5	.828
Yale †	11	–	3	.786	23	–	10	.697
Cornell	11	–	3	.786	22	–	8	.733
Brown	8	–	6	.571	13	–	18	.419
Harvard	5	–	9	.357	14	–	13	.519
Columbia	4	–	10	.286	13	–	14	.481
Penn	3	–	11	.214	11	–	18	.379
Dartmouth	2	–	12	.143	6	–	21	.222
† 2024 Ivy League tournament winner

The 2023–24 Penn Quakers men's basketball team represented the University of Pennsylvania during the 2023–24 NCAA Division I men's basketball season. The Quakers, led by eighth-year head coach Steve Donahue, played their home games at The Palestra in Philadelphia, Pennsylvania as members of the Ivy League. They finished the season 11–18, 3–11 in Ivy League play, to finish in seventh place. They failed to qualify for the Ivy League tournament.

== Previous season ==
The Quakers finished the 2022–23 season 17–13, 9–5 in Ivy League play, to finish in third place. They were defeated by eventual champions Princeton in the semifinals of the Ivy League tournament.

== Roster ==
2023–24 Penn Quakers men's basketball team
Players
Coaches

Pos.	#	Name	Height	Weight	Year	Hometown
G	0	Clark Slajchert	6 ft 1 in (1.85 m)	170 lb (77 kg)	Sr	Los Angeles, CA
G	1	Colin Chambers	6 ft 0 in (1.83 m)	195 lb (88 kg)	Sr	Malvern, PA
F	3	Johnnie Walter	6 ft 10 in (2.08 m)	215 lb (98 kg)	So	Agoura Hills, CA
G	4	Tyler Perkins	6 ft 4 in (1.93 m)	205 lb (93 kg)	Fr	Lorton, VA
G	5	Cam Thrower	6 ft 3 in (1.91 m)	190 lb (86 kg)	So	Manhattan Beach, CA
G/F	10	Eddie III Holland	6 ft 6 in (1.98 m)	210 lb (95 kg)	Jr	Philadelphia, PA
G	11	Sam Brown	6 ft 3 in (1.91 m)	180 lb (82 kg)	Fr	Merion Station, PA
F/C	13	Nick Spinoso	6 ft 9 in (2.06 m)	240 lb (109 kg)	Jr	Port Washington, NY
G	15	Andrew Laczkowski	6 ft 6 in (1.98 m)	200 lb (91 kg)	Sr	Dallas, TX
G	22	Jake Hsu	6 ft 0 in (1.83 m)	180 lb (82 kg)	So	Ambler, PA
G	24	Reese McMullen	6 ft 3 in (1.91 m)	185 lb (84 kg)	Jr	Memphis, TN
F	25	Augustus Gerhart	6 ft 9 in (2.06 m)	235 lb (107 kg)	Fr	Denver, PA
F/C	34	Chris Ubochi	6 ft 9 in (2.06 m)	215 lb (98 kg)	So	Lagos, Nigeria
G/F	35	Niklas Polonowski	6 ft 6 in (1.98 m)	210 lb (95 kg)	Fr	La Grange, IL
G	40	George Smith	6 ft 4 in (1.93 m)	205 lb (93 kg)	Jr	Salem, NH

Head coach

- Steve Donahue (Ursinus)

Assistant coach(es)

- Nat Graham (Penn)
- Joe Mihalich Jr. (Nazareth)
- Kris Saulny (Widener)

Legend

- (C) Team captain
- (S) Suspended
- (I) Ineligible
- (W) Walk-on
- Injured
- Current redshirt

Roster
Last update: November 7, 2023

== Schedule and results ==
Date time, TV	Rank^{#}	Opponent^{#}	Result	Record	Site (attendance) city, state
Non-conference regular season
November 6, 2023*; 6:00 p.m., ESPN+		John Jay	W 102–57	1–0	The Palestra (636); Philadelphia, PA
November 8, 2023*; 7:00 p.m., ESPN+		Bucknell	W 80–61	2–0	The Palestra (1,571); Philadelphia, PA
November 10, 2023*; 6:30 p.m., ESPN+/NBCSPHI		at Saint Joseph's; Big 5 Classic Pod 1	L 61–69	2–1	Hagan Arena (2,738); Philadelphia, PA
November 13, 2023*; 7:00 p.m., ESPN+/NBCSPHI		No. 21 Villanova; Big 5 Classic Pod 1	W 76–72	3–1	The Palestra (6,723); Philadelphia, PA
November 18, 2023*; 4:00 p.m.		at Maryland Eastern Shore	L 80–83 ^{OT}	3–2	Hytche Athletic Center (1,883); Princess Anne, MD
November 24, 2023*; 4:30 p.m., ESPN+		Lafayette; Cathedral of College Basketball Classic	W 74–72	4–2	The Palestra (1,883); Philadelphia, PA
November 25, 2023*; 4:30 p.m., ESPN+		Belmont; Cathedral of College Basketball Classic	L 79–84 ^{OT}	4–3	The Palestra (1,534); Philadelphia, PA
November 26, 2023*; 2:30 p.m., ESPN+		Monmouth; Cathedral of College Basketball Classic	W 76–61	5–3	The Palestra (840); Philadelphia, PA
December 2, 2023*; 4:45 p.m., NBCPHI+/Peacock		vs. La Salle; Big 5 Classic third-place game	L 92–93 ^{OT}	5–4	Wells Fargo Center; Philadelphia, PA
December 6, 2023*; 6:00 p.m., ESPN+		FDU–Florham	W 111–57	6–4	The Palestra (628); Philadelphia, PA
December 9, 2023*; 12:00 p.m., ESPN2		vs. No. 16 Kentucky; Malone's Classic	L 66–81	6–5	Wells Fargo Center (9,007); Philadelphia, PA
December 11, 2023*; 7:00 p.m., ESPN+		Howard	W 78–68	7–5	The Palestra (1,062); Philadelphia, PA
December 23, 2023*; 1:00 p.m., ESPN+		at Rider	W 77–73 ^{OT}	8–5	Alumni Gymnasium (1,650); Lawrenceville, NJ
December 30, 2023*; 7:00 p.m., ESPN+		at No. 3 Houston	L 42–81	8–6	Fertitta Center (7,216); Houston, TX
January 2, 2024*; 9:00 p.m., SECN		at No. 25 Auburn	L 68–88	8–7	Neville Arena (9,121); Auburn, AL
Ivy League regular season
January 6, 2024; 2:00 p.m., ESPN+		Dartmouth	W 80–51	9–7 (1–0)	The Palestra (1,949); Philadelphia, PA
January 15, 2024; 2:00 p.m., ESPN+		at Cornell	L 60–77	9–8 (1–1)	Newman Arena (1,462); Ithaca, NY
January 20, 2024; 6:00 p.m., ESPN+		Harvard	L 61–70	9–9 (1–2)	The Palestra (4,960); Philadelphia, PA
January 27, 2024; 2:00 p.m., ESPN+		at Columbia	L 81–84	9–10 (1–3)	Levien Gymnasium (2,076); New York, NY
February 2, 2024; 7:00 p.m., ESPN+		at Brown	L 61–70	9–11 (1–4)	Pizzitola Sports Center (1,284); Providence, RI
February 3, 2024; 7:00 p.m., ESPN+		at Yale	L 58–74	9–12 (1–5)	John J. Lee Amphitheater (1,784); New Haven, CT
February 10, 2024; 5:00 p.m., ESPN+		at Princeton; Rivalry	L 70–77	9–13 (1–6)	Jadwin Gymnasium (5,290); Princeton, NJ
February 16, 2024; 7:00 p.m., ESPN+		Yale	L 62–76	9–14 (1–7)	The Palestra (2,203); Philadelphia, PA
February 17, 2024; 6:00 p.m., ESPN+		Brown	L 64–71	9–15 (1–8)	The Palestra (1,966); Philadelphia, PA
February 23, 2024; 7:00 p.m., ESPN+		at Dartmouth	W 82–69	10–15 (2–8)	Leede Arena (733); Hanover, NH
February 24, 2024; 7:00 p.m., ESPN+		at Harvard	L 70–74	10–16 (2–9)	Lavietes Pavilion (1,636); Cambridge, MA
March 1, 2024; 8:00 p.m., ESPN+		Cornell	L 81–87	10–17 (2–10)	The Palestra (1,995); Philadelphia, PA
March 2, 2024; 7:00 p.m., ESPN+		Columbia	W 84–72	11–17 (3–10)	The Palestra (1,488); Philadelphia, PA
March 9, 2024; 6:00 p.m., ESPN+		Princeton; Rivalry	L 83–105	11–18 (3–11)	The Palestra (4,488); Philadelphia, PA
*Non-conference game. ^{#}Rankings from AP poll. (#) Tournament seedings in parentheses. All times are in Eastern.
