= Jacksonville Classic =

American college basketball tournament

- Jacksonville Classic

Tournament information
- Sport: College Basketball
- Location: United States (campus sites); Adams-Jenkins Community Sports & Music Complex, Jacksonville, FL
- Month played: November
- Established: 2021
- Format: MTE
- Teams: 10

Current champion
- Bay: Cornell; Coast: UCF

The Jacksonville Classic is a preseason college basketball tournament first held in 2021. The tournament originally featured eight teams in two four-team brackets; the current edition leverages a showcase format with preset matchups.

== History ==
=== Champions ===
Year	Division	Champion
2021	Duval	Florida State
2021	Jacksonville	Boston University
2023	Bay	Cornell
2023	Coast	UCF
2024	Showcase	Not Applicable
2025	Showcase	Not Applicable

== Brackets ==
* – Denotes overtime period

=== 2025 ===
==== Men's ====
The 2025 Jacksonville Classic will be played as a Showcase Format, with a ten team field, using predetermined opponents, held in the Adams-Jenkins Community Sports & Music Complex on the campus of Edward Waters University.

Sunday, November 23
Delaware	59
Southern Illinois	79

Sunday, November 23
UNC Greensboro	68
Youngstown State	62

Monday, November 24
Southern Illinois	73
UAB	81

Monday, November 24
UTEP	63
William & Mary	74

Monday, November 24
Youngstown State	67
Georgia Southern	61

Monday, November 24
Abilene Christian	61
UTSA	50

Tuesday, November 25
Delaware	73
UNC Greensboro	60

Tuesday, November 25
UAB	75
UTEP	59

Tuesday, November 25
William & Mary	92
Abilene Christian	58

Tuesday, November 25
Georgia Southern	64
UTSA	77

=== 2024 ===
==== Men's ====
The 2024 Jacksonville Classic will be a six team field with a Showcase Format with predetermined opponents. The 2024 Jacksonville Classic will be played at a new venue; South Campus Gym on the campus of Florida State College at Jacksonville.

Tuesday, November 26
Tulsa	63
Detroit Mercy	44

Tuesday, November 26
Georgia State	52
Austin Peay	50

Wednesday, November 27
Rhode Island	81
Detroit Mercy	75

Wednesday, November 27
Tulsa	74
Georgia State	71

Wednesday, November 27
UT Arlington	68
Austin Peay	58

Thursday, November 28
UT Arlington	76
Rhode Island	83

=== 2023 ===
==== Campus Games ====
November 15
Cornell	83
George Mason	90

November 16
Cal State Fullerton	44
UCF	72

November 16
Utah Valley	45
Charlotte	62

November 22
South Dakota State	65
Southern Miss	54

==== Bay Bracket ====
Semifinals; November 19
Utah Valley	67
Southern Miss	65
Cal State Fullerton	70
Cornell	80

Championship; November 20
Utah Valley	61
Cornell	74
Consolation; November 20
Southern Miss	67
Cal State Fullerton	74

==== Coast Bracket ====
Semifinals; November 19
George Mason	49
Charlotte	54
UCF	83
South Dakota State	80

Championship; November 20
Charlotte	71
UCF	74*
Consolation; November 20
George Mason	73
South Dakota State	71

=== 2021 ===
==== Campus Games ====
November 17
Loyola Marymount	82
Little Rock	63

November 18
Missouri	54
Northern Illinois	37

November 24
Florida State	81*
Boston University	80

November 24
SMU	75
Sam Houston State	66

==== Duval Bracket ====
Semifinals; November 21; CBSSN
Florida State	73
Loyola Marymount	45
Missouri	80*
SMU	75

Championship; November 22; CBSSN
Florida State	81
Missouri	58
Consolation; November 22; CBSSN
Loyola Marymount	76
SMU	70

==== Jacksonville Bracket ====
Semifinals; November 21
Boston University	76
Northern Illinois	58
Little Rock	59
Sam Houston State	77

Championship; November 22
Boston University	72
Sam Houston State	59
Consolation; November 22
Northern Illinois	60
Little Rock	67
