= 2023–24 Brown Bears men's basketball team =

American college basketball season

2023–24 Brown Bears men's basketball
- Conference: Ivy League
- Record: 13–18 (8–6 Ivy)
- Head coach: Mike Martin (11th season)
- Associate head coach: T. J. Sorrentine
- Assistant coaches: Tyson Wheeler; Sam Hershberger
- Home arena: Pizzitola Sports Center (Capacity: 2,800)

2023–24 Ivy League men's basketball standings
	Conf.				Overall
Team	W		L	PCT	W		L	PCT
Princeton	12	–	2	.857	24	–	5	.828
Yale †	11	–	3	.786	23	–	10	.697
Cornell	11	–	3	.786	22	–	8	.733
Brown	8	–	6	.571	13	–	18	.419
Harvard	5	–	9	.357	14	–	13	.519
Columbia	4	–	10	.286	13	–	14	.481
Penn	3	–	11	.214	11	–	18	.379
Dartmouth	2	–	12	.143	6	–	21	.222
† 2024 Ivy League tournament winner

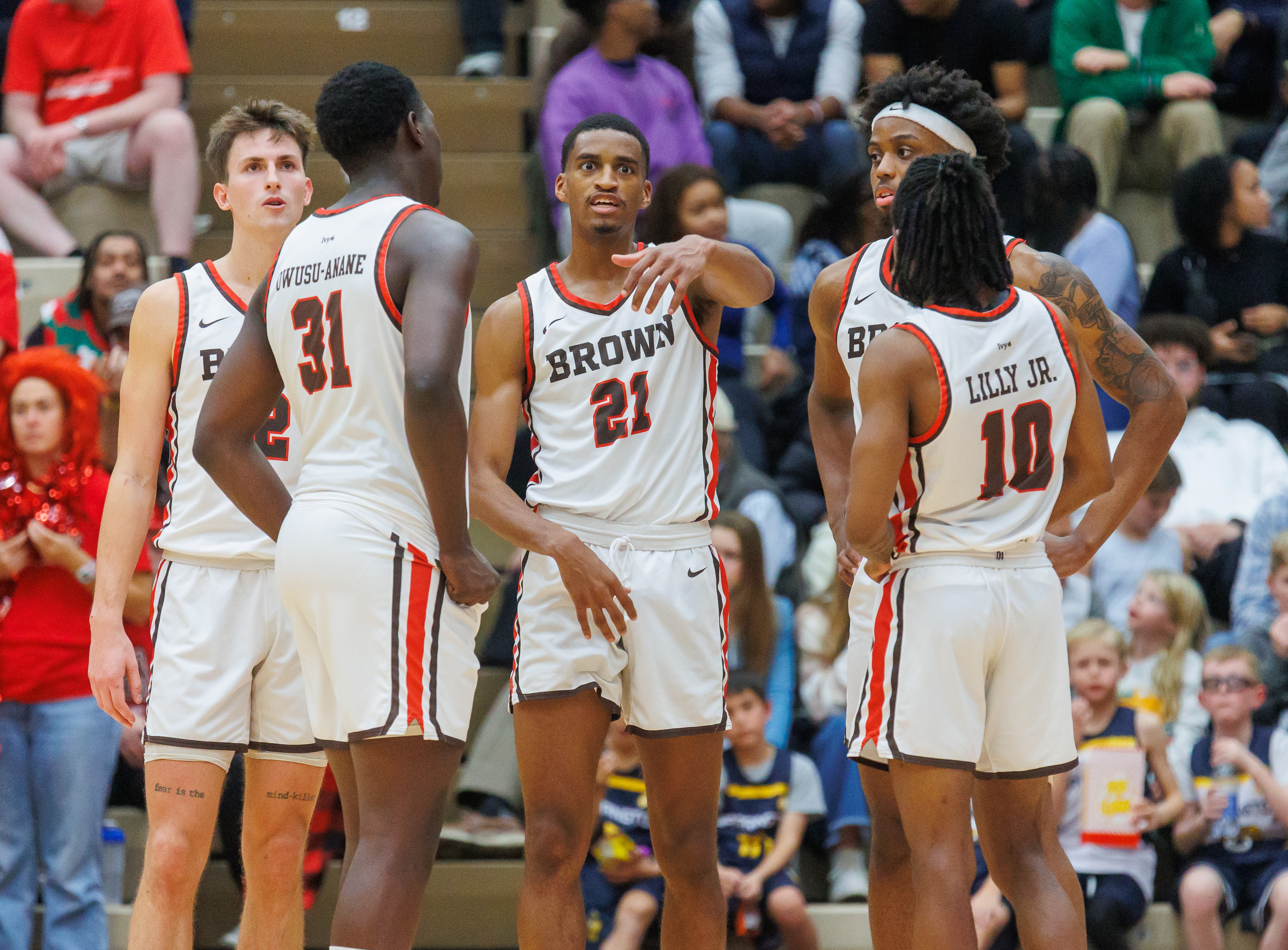
Bryant game, December 1: Aaron Cooley gestures to the referee

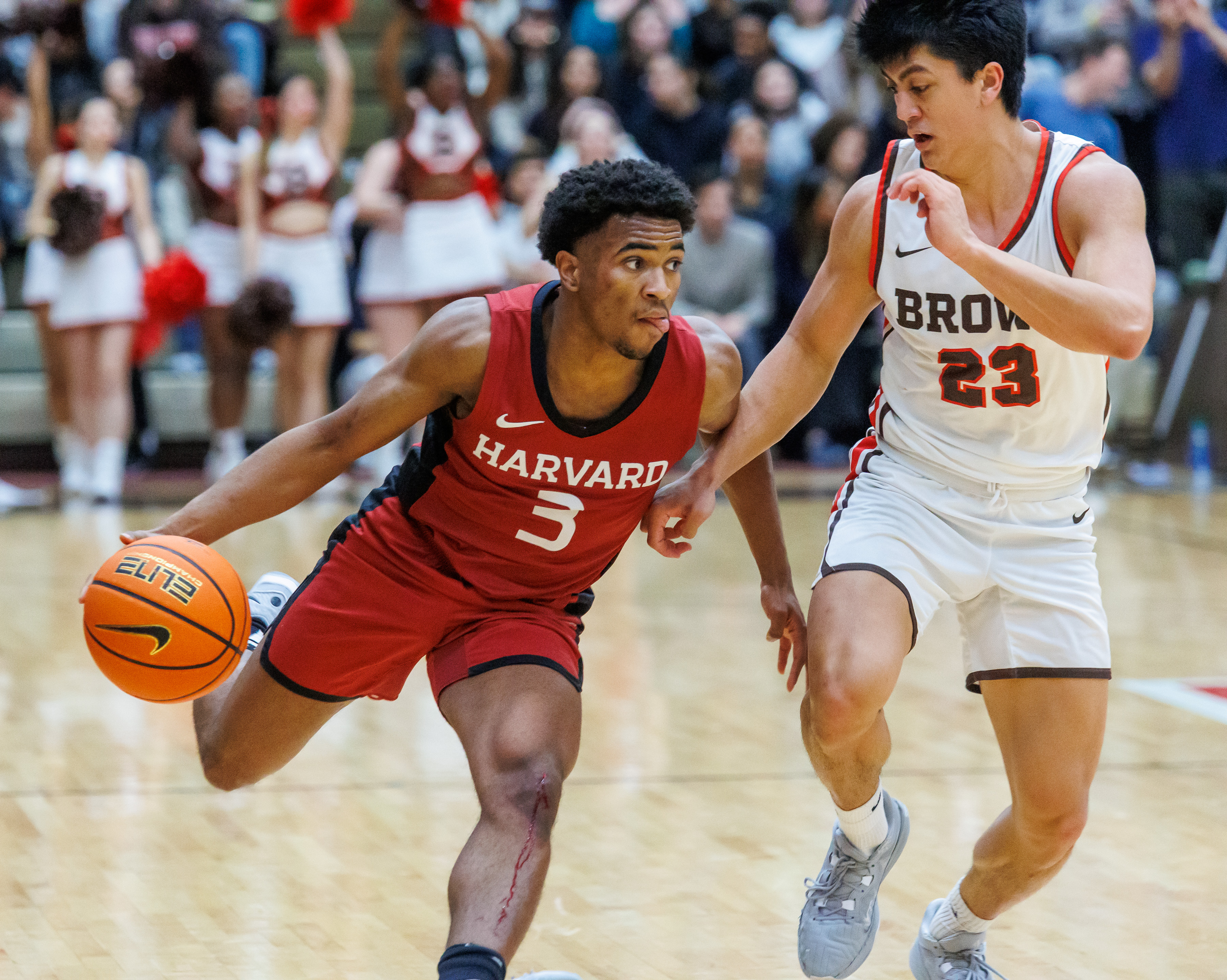
Harvard game, March 1: Harvard's Xavier Nesbitt, bleeding from the knee, dribbles past Brown's Kimo Ferrari

The 2023–24 Brown Bears men's basketball team represented Brown University during the 2023–24 NCAA Division I men's basketball season. The Bears, led by 11th-year head coach Mike Martin, played their home games at the Pizzitola Sports Center located in Providence, Rhode Island, as members of the Ivy League.

The team qualified for its first ever Ivy League Tournament by finishing 4th in the Ivy League regular season.

== Previous season ==
The Bears finished the 2022–23 season of 14–13, 7–7 in Ivy League play, tying for fourth place. They failed to qualify for the Ivy League tournament.

== Roster ==
2023–24 Brown Bears men's basketball team
Players
Coaches

Pos.	#	Name	Height	Weight	Year	Previous school	Hometown
G	2	Felix Kloman	6 ft 5 in (1.96 m)	190 lb (86 kg)	Sr	Pingree School	Ipswich, MA
G	4	Lyndel Erold	6 ft 3 in (1.91 m)	170 lb (77 kg)	Jr	Saint Sebastian's School	Boston, MA
G	5	Sam Klores	6 ft 1 in (1.85 m)	180 lb (82 kg)	Jr	Riverdale Country School	New York, NY
G	10	Kino Lilly Jr.	6 ft 0 in (1.83 m)	165 lb (75 kg)	Jr	Landon School	Glenn Dale, MD
F	11	Malachi Ndur	6 ft 8 in (2.03 m)	215 lb (98 kg)	Sr	Cushing Academy	St. Thomas, ON
G	13	Malcolm Wrisby-Jefferson	6 ft 4 in (1.93 m)	195 lb (88 kg)	Fr	The Phelps School	Queens, NY
G	14	Luke Paragon	6 ft 4 in (1.93 m)	195 lb (88 kg)	Fr	Cicero–North Syracuse High School	Cicero, NY
F	15	Kalu Anya	6 ft 8 in (2.03 m)	215 lb (98 kg)	So	IMG Academy	Worcester, MA
G/F	21	Aaron Cooley	6 ft 5 in (1.96 m)	185 lb (84 kg)	Jr	Newton North High School	Roxbury, MA
F	22	Landon Lewis	6 ft 7 in (2.01 m)	215 lb (98 kg)	So	Harvard-Westlake School	Los Angeles, CA
G	23	Kimo Ferrari	6 ft 0 in (1.83 m)	185 lb (84 kg)	Sr	Francis Parker School	San Diego, CA
F	24	Drew Kania	6 ft 8 in (2.03 m)	215 lb (98 kg)	So	Gill St. Bernard's School	Chatham, NJ
G	25	Adrian Uchidiuno	6 ft 2 in (1.88 m)	160 lb (73 kg)	Fr	Cushing Academy	Markham, ON
F	31	Nana Owusu-Anane	6 ft 8 in (2.03 m)	220 lb (100 kg)	Jr	Putnam Science Academy	Burlington, ON
G	33	Alexander Lesburt Jr.	6 ft 5 in (1.96 m)	197 lb (89 kg)	So	Bradford Christian Academy	Derry, NH
F	43	Symeon Efstathiou	6 ft 9 in (2.06 m)	215 lb (98 kg)	Fr	Moraitis School	Athens, Greece
F	45	N'famara Dabo	6 ft 8 in (2.03 m)	225 lb (102 kg)	Fr	Napa Christian	Conakry, Guinea

Head coach

- Mike Martin (Brown)

Assistant coach(es)

- T. J. Sorrentine (Vermont)
- Tyson Wheeler (Fairfield)
- Sam Hershberger (Elon)

Legend

- (C) Team captain
- (S) Suspended
- (I) Ineligible
- (W) Walk-on
- Injured
- Current redshirt

Roster
Last update: November 16, 2023

== Schedule and results ==
Date time, TV	Rank^{#}	Opponent^{#}	Result	Record	High points	High rebounds	High assists	Site (attendance) city, state
Non-conference regular season
November 6, 2023*; 7:00 pm, ESPN+		at Colgate	L 70–72	0–1	21 – Lilly Jr.	11 – Owusu-Anane	3 – Lilly Jr.	Cotterell Court (1,036); Hamilton, NY
November 11, 2023*; 11:30 am, NESN/ESPN+		Loyola (MD)	L 75–77 ^{OT}	0–2	27 – Lilly Jr.	13 – Owusu-Anane	4 – Lilly Jr.	Pizzitola Sports Center (846); Providence, RI
November 14, 2023*; 7:00 pm, ESPN+		at New Hampshire	L 64–82	0–3	20 – Owusu-Anane	10 – Owusu-Anane	2 – 2 Tied	Lundholm Gym (578); Durham, NH
November 16, 2023*; 6:00 pm, ESPN+		Rhode Island College	W 92–51	1–3	16 – Owusu-Anane	5 – Tied	5 – Anya	Pizzitola Sports Center (323); Providence, RI
November 19, 2023*; 8:00 pm, P12N		at No. 16 USC	L 70–81	1–4	24 – Lilly Jr.	11 – Owusu-Anane	6 – Lilly Jr.	Galen Center (4,522); Los Angeles, CA
November 24, 2023*; 1:30 pm, FloHoops		vs. Delaware; Nassau Championship first round	L 59–67	1–5	22 – Lilly Jr.	10 – Cooley	4 – Lilly Jr.	Baha Mar Convention Center (213); Nassau, Bahamas
November 25, 2023*; 11:00 am, FloHoops		vs. Kansas City; Nassau Championship 2nd round	W 93–83 ^{OT}	2–5	27 – Lilly Jr.	6 – Lesburt Jr.	4 – Cooley	Baha Mar Convention Center (211); Nassau, Bahamas
November 26, 2023*; 1:30 pm, FloHoops		vs. Ohio; Nassau Championship 5th place game	L 77–82	2–6	21 – Lilly Jr.	11 – Owusu-Anane	3 – Tied	Baha Mar Convention Center (251); Nassau, Bahamas
December 1, 2023*; 7:00 pm, ESPN+		Bryant; Ocean State Cup	L 66–69	2–7	19 – Lilly Jr.	11 – Anya	6 – Anya	Pizzitola Sports Center (1,113); Providence, RI
December 3, 2023*; 12:00 pm, ESPN+		at Maine	L 49–60	2–8	15 – Owusu-Anane	11 – Owusu-Anane	4 – Kloman	Memorial Gymnasium (631); Orono, ME
December 6, 2023*; 7:00 pm, ESPN+		at Rhode Island; Ocean State Cup	W 67–64	3–8	22 – Lilly Jr.	7 – Anya	4 – Ndur	Ryan Center (4,475); Kingston, RI
December 10, 2023*; 12:00 pm, CBSSN		at Providence; Ocean State Cup	L 54–74	3–9	15 – Owusu-Anane	9 – Owusu-Anane	3 – Lilly Jr.	Amica Mutual Pavilion (8,655); Providence, RI
December 22, 2023*; 2:00 pm, ESPN+		Siena	W 71–67	4–9	26 – Lilly Jr.	12 – Owusu-Anane	5 – Lilly Jr.	Pizzitola Sports Center (611); Providence, RI
December 29, 2023*; 6:30 pm, FloHoops		at Stony Brook	L 65–69	4–10	19 – Lilly Jr.	10 – Anya	4 – Ferrari	Island Federal Arena (2,429); Stony Brook, NY
January 2, 2024*; 7:00 pm, ESPN+		Vermont	L 70–71	4–11	18 – Lilly Jr.	12 – Anya	6 – Lilly Jr.	Pizzitola Sports Center (623); Providence, RI
Ivy League regular season
January 9, 2024; 7:00 pm, ESPN+		Yale	L 70–80	4–12 (0–1)	23 – Lilly Jr.	11 – Owusu-Anane	4 – Lilly Jr.	Pizzitola Sports Center (777); Providence, RI
January 15, 2024; 2:00 pm, ESPN+		at Harvard	W 74–72	5–12 (1–1)	19 – Lilly Jr.	9 – Owusu-Anane	4 – Lilly Jr.	Lavietes Pavilion (1,124); Cambridge, MA
January 20, 2024; 2:00 pm, ESPN+		Cornell	L 83–84	5–13 (1–2)	21 – Owusu-Anane	7 – Tied	5 – Lilly Jr.	Pizzitola Sports Center (1,012); Providence, RI
January 27, 2024; 2:00 pm, ESPN+		at Dartmouth	L 71–75	5–14 (1–3)	20 – Owusu-Anane	9 – Owusu-Anane	4 – Ferrari	Leede Arena (868); Hanover, NH
February 2, 2024; 7:00 pm, ESPN+		Penn	W 70–61	6–14 (2–3)	19 – Tied	13 – Anya	4 – Owusu-Anane	Pizzitola Sports Center (1,284); Providence, RI
February 3, 2024; 6:00 pm, ESPN+		Princeton	L 60–70	6–15 (2–4)	20 – Owusu-Anane	9 – Anya	2 – Tied	Pizzitola Sports Center (1,350); Providence, RI
February 10, 2024; 12:00 pm, NESN/ESPN+		Columbia	L 69–83	6–16 (2–5)	24 – Lilly	8 – Ndur	5 – Ferrari	Pizzitola Sports Center (897); Providence, RI
February 16, 2024; 7:00 pm, ESPN+		at Princeton	L 63–72	6–17 (2–6)	17 – Owusu-Anane	8 – Cooley	6 – Lilly Jr.	Jadwin Gymnasium (2,533); Princeton, NJ
February 17, 2024; 6:00 pm, ESPN+		at Penn	W 71–64	7–17 (3–6)	25 – Lilly Jr.	11 – Owusu-Anane	4 – Tied	The Palestra (1,966); Philadelphia, PA
February 23, 2024; 7:00 pm, ESPN+		at Columbia	W 66–64	8–17 (4–6)	18 – Ferrari	13 – Anya	7 – Anya	Levien Gymnasium (1,203); New York, NY
February 24, 2024; 6:00 pm, ESPN+		at Cornell	W 78–74	9–17 (5–6)	23 – Anya	17 – Anya	5 – Ferrari	Newman Arena (1,864); Ithaca, NY
March 1, 2024; 7:00 pm, ESPN+		Harvard	W 71–68 ^{OT}	10–17 (6–6)	16 – Lilly Jr.	14 – Owusu-Anane	5 – Lilly Jr.	Pizzitola Sports Center (1,788); Providence, RI
March 2, 2024; 6:00 pm, ESPN+		Dartmouth	W 89–64	11–17 (7–6)	39 – Ferrari	8 – Owusu-Anane	8 – Tied	Pizzitola Sports Center (1,118); Providence, RI
March 9, 2024; 12:00 pm, ESPN+		at Yale	W 84–81 ^{OT}	12–17 (8–6)	26 – Lilly Jr.	11 – Anya	4 – Lilly Jr.	John J. Lee Amphitheater (1,580); New Haven, CT
Ivy League Tournament
March 16, 2024; 11:00 am, ESPNU	(4)	vs. (1) Princeton; Semifinals	W 90–81	13–17	27 – Lilly Jr.	15 – Owusu-Anane	10 – Lilly Jr.	Levien Gymnasium; New York, NY
March 17, 2024; 12:00 pm, ESPN2	(4)	vs. (2) Yale; Championship	L 61–62	13–18	21 – Lilly Jr.	7 – Anya	4 – Ndur	Levien Gymnasium; New York, NY
*Non-conference game. ^{#}Rankings from AP Poll. (#) Tournament seedings in parentheses. All times are in Eastern.
