= 2023–24 Yale Bulldogs men's basketball team =

American college basketball season

2023–24 Yale Bulldogs men's basketball

Ivy League tournament champions

NCAA tournament, Second Round
- Conference: Ivy League
- Record: 23–10 (11–3 Ivy)
- Head coach: James Jones (25th season)
- Associate head coach: Matt Kingsley; Justin Simon
- Assistant coach: Brandon Sherrod
- Home arena: John J. Lee Amphitheater

2023–24 Ivy League men's basketball standings
	Conf.				Overall
Team	W		L	PCT	W		L	PCT
Princeton	12	–	2	.857	24	–	5	.828
Yale †	11	–	3	.786	23	–	10	.697
Cornell	11	–	3	.786	22	–	8	.733
Brown	8	–	6	.571	13	–	18	.419
Harvard	5	–	9	.357	14	–	13	.519
Columbia	4	–	10	.286	13	–	14	.481
Penn	3	–	11	.214	11	–	18	.379
Dartmouth	2	–	12	.143	6	–	21	.222
† 2024 Ivy League tournament winner

The 2023–24 Yale Bulldogs men's basketball team represented Yale University during the 2023–24 NCAA Division I men's basketball season. The Bulldogs, led by 24th-year head coach James Jones, played their home games at John J. Lee Amphitheater in New Haven, Connecticut as members of the Ivy League.

Yale captured its third Ivy League tournament in five seasons with a dramatic 62–61 victory over Brown capped off by a memorable buzzer-beating floater by Matt Knowling. The Bulldogs went on to upset the #4 seed in the East Region, Auburn, in the NCAA tournament. Their season came to an end with a loss to San Diego State in the second round.

== Previous season ==
The Bulldogs finished the 2022–23 season 20–7, 10–4 in Ivy League play to finish in a tie for 1st place. In the Ivy Tournament, they defeated Cornell in the semifinals, before losing to Princeton in the championship game. They received an automatic bid to the NIT, losing to Vanderbilt in the first round.

== Roster ==
2023–24 Yale Bulldogs men's basketball team
Players
Coaches

Pos.	#	Name	Height	Weight	Year	Hometown
G	0	Trevor Mullin	6 ft 0 in (1.83 m)	175 lb (79 kg)	Fr	Wellesley, Massachusetts
F	1	Danny Wolf	7 ft 0 in (2.13 m)	255 lb (116 kg)	So	Glencoe, Illinois
G	2	Bez Mbeng	6 ft 4 in (1.93 m)	185 lb (84 kg)	Jr	Potomac, Maryland
G	3	August Mahoney (C)	6 ft 4 in (1.93 m)	195 lb (88 kg)	Sr	Saratoga Springs, New York
G	4	John Poulakidas	6 ft 6 in (1.98 m)	205 lb (93 kg)	Jr	Naperville, Illinois
G	5	Jeannot Basima	6 ft 4 in (1.93 m)	190 lb (86 kg)	Fr	Goma, Democratic Republic of the Congo
C	10	Samson Aletan	6 ft 10 in (2.08 m)	223 lb (101 kg)	Fr	Dallas, Texas
G	11	Emir Buyukhanli	6 ft 5 in (1.96 m)	200 lb (91 kg)	Jr	Ankara, Turkey
G	12	Teo Rice	6 ft 2 in (1.88 m)	190 lb (86 kg)	Jr	Bethesda, Maryland
F	14	Casey Simmons	6 ft 6 in (1.98 m)	180 lb (82 kg)	So	Milton, Massachusetts
F	21	Luke Kolaja	6 ft 8 in (2.03 m)	225 lb (102 kg)	Sr	Montclair, New Jersey
F	22	Matt Knowling	6 ft 6 in (1.98 m)	200 lb (91 kg)	Sr	Ellington, Connecticut
F	23	Yussif Basa-Ama	6 ft 8 in (2.03 m)	195 lb (88 kg)	Sr	Bolgatanga, Ghana
G	24	Yassine Gharram	6 ft 3 in (1.91 m)	195 lb (88 kg)	Jr	San Diego, California
F	33	Jack Molloy	6 ft 7 in (2.01 m)	245 lb (111 kg)	Jr	Greenwich, Connecticut
F	42	Nick Townsend	6 ft 7 in (2.01 m)	250 lb (113 kg)	So	Chappaqua, New York
G	44	Devon Arlington	6 ft 3 in (1.91 m)	190 lb (86 kg)	So	San Marcos, California

Head coach

- James Jones (Albany)

Assistant coach(es)

- Matt Kingsley (Wesleyan)
- Justin Simon (Yale)
- Brandon Sherrod (Yale)

Legend

- (C) Team captain
- (S) Suspended
- (I) Ineligible
- (W) Walk-on
- Injured
- Current redshirt

Roster
Last update: October 20, 2023

== Schedule and results ==
Date time, TV	Rank^{#}	Opponent^{#}	Result	Record	Site (attendance) city, state
Non-conference regular season
November 6, 2023*; 7:00 p.m., ESPN+		Vassar	W 102–53	1–0	John J. Lee Amphitheater (950); New Haven, CT
November 10, 2023*; 9:00 p.m.		at No. 11 Gonzaga	L 71–86	1–1	McCarthey Athletic Center (6,000); Spokane, WA
November 12, 2023*; 6:00 p.m., ESPN+		at Loyola Marymount	W 83–80	2–1	Gersten Pavilion (1,571); Los Angeles, CA
November 17, 2023*; 6:00 p.m.		vs. Colgate; Atlantic Slam	W 68–50	3–1	Avenir Centre; Moncton, NB
November 18, 2023*; 6:00 p.m., ESPN+		vs. Weber State; Atlantic Slam	L 65–75 ^{OT}	3–2	Avenir Centre; Moncton, NB
November 19, 2023*; 3:00 p.m., ESPN+		vs. Gardner–Webb; Atlantic Slam	W 71–70 ^{OT}	4–2	Avenir Centre; Moncton, NB
November 26, 2023*; 4:00 p.m.		at Rhode Island	L 72–76	4–3	Ryan Center (3,511); Kingston, RI
November 29, 2023*; 7:00 p.m., ESPN+		Stony Brook	W 79–71	5–3	John J. Lee Amphitheater (629); New Haven, CT
December 2, 2023*; 7:00 p.m., ESPN+		at Vermont	L 65–66	5–4	Patrick Gym; Burlington, VT
December 6, 2023*; 7:00 p.m., ESPN+		Fairfield	L 71–75	5–5	John J. Lee Amphitheater (747); New Haven, CT
December 8, 2023*; 7:00 p.m., ESPN+		Colby–Sawyer	W 95–36	6–5	John J. Lee Amphitheater (612); New Haven, CT
December 11, 2023*; 7:00 p.m., ESPN+		at Quinnipiac	W 73–66	7–5	M&T Bank Arena (1,156); Hamden, CT
December 22, 2023*; 8:00 p.m., ESPN+		at No. 2 Kansas	L 60–75	7–6	Allen Fieldhouse (16,300); Lawrence, KS
December 30, 2023*; 7:00 p.m., ESPN+		at Santa Clara	W 66–58	8–6	Leavey Center (1,751); Santa Clara, CA
January 3, 2024*; 4:00 p.m.		at Howard	W 86–78 ^{OT}	9–6	Burr Gymnasium (557); Washington, D.C.
Ivy League regular season
January 9, 2024; 7:00 p.m., ESPN+		at Brown	W 80–70	10–6 (1–0)	Pizzitola Sports Center (777); Providence, RI
January 15, 2024; 7:00 p.m., ESPN+		Columbia	W 89–70	11–6 (2–0)	John J. Lee Amphitheater (1,845); New Haven, CT
January 20, 2024; 2:00 p.m., ESPN+		at Dartmouth	W 76–51	12–6 (3–0)	Leede Arena (773); Hanover, NH
January 27, 2024; 2:00 p.m., ESPN+		at Harvard	W 78–65	13–6 (4–0)	Lavietes Pavilion (1,636); Cambridge, MA
February 2, 2024; 7:00 p.m., ESPNU		Princeton	W 70–64	14–6 (5–0)	John J. Lee Amphitheater (2,532); New Haven, CT
February 3, 2024; 7:00 p.m., ESPN+		Penn	W 74–58	15–6 (6–0)	John J. Lee Amphitheater (1,784); New Haven, CT
February 10, 2024; 7:00 p.m., ESPN+		Cornell	W 80–78	16–6 (7–0)	John J. Lee Amphitheater (2,532); New Haven, CT
February 16, 2024; 7:00 p.m., ESPN+		at Penn	W 76–62	17–6 (8–0)	The Palestra (2,203); Philadelphia, PA
February 17, 2024; 7:00 p.m., ESPN2		at Princeton	L 62–73	17–7 (8–1)	Jadwin Gymnasium (4,358); Princeton, NJ
February 23, 2024; 7:00 p.m., ESPN+		at Cornell	L 62–65	17–8 (8–2)	Newman Arena (3,644); Ithaca, NY
February 24, 2024; 6:00 p.m., ESPN+		at Columbia	W 84–76	18–8 (9–2)	Levien Gymnasium (1,397); New York, NY
March 1, 2024; 7:00 p.m., ESPN+		Dartmouth	W 80–56	19–8 (10–2)	John J. Lee Amphitheater (1,380); New Haven, CT
March 2, 2024; 7:00 p.m., ESPN+		Harvard	W 80–60	20–8 (11–2)	John J. Lee Amphitheater (2,532); New Haven, CT
March 9, 2024; 12:00 p.m., ESPN+		Brown	L 81–84 ^{OT}	20–9 (11–3)	John J. Lee Amphitheater (1,580); New Haven, CT
Ivy League Tournament
March 16, 2024; 2:00 p.m., ESPNews	(2)	vs. (3) Cornell; Semifinals	W 69–57	21–9	Levien Gymnasium (2,605); New York, NY
March 17, 2024; 12:00 p.m., ESPN2	(2)	vs. (4) Brown; Championship	W 62–61	22–9	Levien Gymnasium (2,278); New York, NY
NCAA Tournament
March 22, 2024*; 4:15 p.m., TNT	(13 E)	vs. (4 E) No. 7 Auburn; First Round	W 78–76	23–9	Spokane Veterans Memorial Arena (11,051); Spokane, WA
March 24, 2024*; 9:40 p.m., TBS	(13 E)	vs. (5 E) No. 24 San Diego State; Second Round	L 57–85	23–10	Spokane Veterans Memorial Arena (11,514); Spokane, WA
*Non-conference game. ^{#}Rankings from AP Poll. (#) Tournament seedings in parentheses. All times are in Eastern Time.
