= Isaiah Gray =

Professional basketball player

No. 7 – Cheshire Phoenix
- Position: Point guard
- League: Super League Basketball

Personal information
- Born: August 18, 2001 (age 25) Brooklyn, New York, U.S.
- Listed height: 6 ft 3 in (1.91 m)
- Listed weight: 217 lb (98 kg)

Career information
- High school: Martin Luther King HS (New York, New York); Cushing Academy (Ashburnham, Massachusetts)
- College: Cornell (2021–2024); Akron (2024–2025)
- NBA draft: 2025: undrafted
- Playing career: 2025–present

Career history
- 2025—2026: BK Opava
- 2026—2027: Cheshire Phoenix

Career highlights
- Honorable Mention All–MAC (2025)

Isaiah Gray (born August 18, 2001) is an American professional basketball player for Cheshire Phoenix of the Super League Basketball. He played college basketball for the Cornell Big Red and the Akron Zips.

== Early Life and High School Career ==
Gray was born on August 18, 2001, in Brooklyn, New York. He attended Martin Luther King High School in New York, where he was a multi-year starter and team captain, earning all-state recognition as a senior. He transferred to Cushing Academy for the 2019-20 season, where he was named first-team all-New England Preparatory School Athletic Council. After graduating high school, he committed to play college basketball at Cornell University.

== College Career ==
Gray played three seasons at Cornell, missing the 2020–21 season, his freshman year, which was canceled due to the COVID-19 pandemic. During his senior season, Gray averaged 9.5 points, 3.8 rebounds, and 3.2 assists per game, finishing second in the Ivy League in field-goal percentage (.602). Cornell ended the 2023-24 season second in the Ivy League, finishing with the second most wins in program history and earning the schools first ever invitation to the NIT. Gray scored 19 points in Cornell's loss to Ohio State in the first round. After graduating from Cornell, Gray transferred to The University of Akron for his final year of eligibility in 2024-25. At Akron, he averaged 9.6 points and 4.6 rebounds per game. Akron finished 17-1 in the MAC and won both the regular season and tournament championship, earning a berth to March Madness. Gray earned all-MAC Honorable Mention.

== Professional Career ==
Gray began his professional basketball career in Europe. He signed to play with Etha Engomis in Cyprus to begin the 2025-26 season. In January 2026, he signed with BK Opava in the Czech Republic for the remainder of the season.
