= Chris Mañon =

American basketball player (born 2001)

No. 30 – Los Angeles Lakers
- Position: Shooting guard
- League: NBA

Personal information
- Born: December 9, 2001 (age 24) New Milford, New Jersey, U.S.
- Listed height: 6 ft 4 in (1.93 m)
- Listed weight: 209 lb (95 kg)

Career information
- High school: Saint Joseph Regional (Montvale, New Jersey); St. Thomas More (Oakdale, Connecticut)
- College: Cornell (2021–2024); Vanderbilt (2024–2025)
- NBA draft: 2025: undrafted
- Playing career: 2025–present

Career history
- 2025–present: Los Angeles Lakers
- 2025–present: →South Bay/Coachella Valley Lakers

Career highlights
- NBA G League All Defensive Team (2026); First-team All–Ivy League (2024)
- Stats at NBA.com
- Stats at Basketball Reference

Christopher J. Mañon (born December 9, 2001) is a Dominican-American professional basketball player for the Los Angeles Lakers of the National Basketball Association (NBA), on a two-way contract with the Coachella Valley Lakers of the NBA G League. He played college basketball for the Cornell Big Red and Vanderbilt Commodores.

== Early life and high school career ==
Mañon was born on December 9, 2001, in New Milford, New Jersey, and is of Dominican descent. He attended Saint Joseph Regional High School in Montvale, where he was named first-team all-league, all-county and all-region as a senior, when he averaged 12.4 points per game. He transferred to St. Thomas School for the 2019–20 season, where he was selected second-team All-New England Preparatory School Athletic Council (NEPSAC). After high school, he committed to playing college basketball for Cornell.

== College career ==
Mañon played three seasons at Cornell, missing the 2020–21 season, his freshman year, which was canceled due to the COVID-19 pandemic. He averaged 9.9 points and 3.7 rebounds per game as a sophomore in 2021–22 and then averaged 11 points and 3.6 rebounds per game as a junior in 2022–23, also setting Cornell's record for single-season steals (63) in the latter season. In his senior year at Cornell, 2023–24, he was unanimously selected first-team All–Ivy League after averaging 12.5 points and four rebounds per game while being the conference leader in steals and steal percentage. Mañon transferred to the Vanderbilt Commodores for a final season in 2024–25. At Vanderbilt, he averaged 6.6 points and 3.7 rebounds per game. His role was primarily defensive, which he described as "guard the best players on the other team and make life hell for them."

== Professional career ==
Mañon played with the Golden State Warriors during the 2025 NBA Summer League. He was the team's leading scorer with 55 points and was also their leader in rebounds per game (5.2) and blocked shots (8). He scored 17 points in his last game and averaged 11 points with the Warriors. Afterwards, Mañon signed a two-way contract with the Los Angeles Lakers on July 24, 2025. He made nine total appearances for the Lakers in the 2025–26 season, averaging 0.8 points, 1.1 rebounds, and 0.3 assists.

On July 3, 2026, Mañon re–signed with Los Angeles on a two–way contract.

== Career statistics ==
Legend
GP	Games played	GS	Games started	MPG	Minutes per game
FG%	Field goal percentage	3P%	3-point field goal percentage	FT%	Free throw percentage
RPG	Rebounds per game	APG	Assists per game	SPG	Steals per game
BPG	Blocks per game	PPG	Points per game	**Bold**	Career high

=== NBA ===
Year	Team	GP	GS	MPG	FG%	3P%	FT%	RPG	APG	SPG	BPG	PPG
2025–26	L.A. Lakers	9	0	5.1	.333	.000	.750	1.1	.3	.6	.2	.8
Career		9	0	5.1	.333	.000	.750	1.1	.3	.6	.2	.8

=== College ===
Year	Team	GP	GS	MPG	FG%	3P%	FT%	RPG	APG	SPG	BPG	PPG
2021–22	Cornell	26	22	18.0	.478	.311	.648	3.7	1.8	1.8	.3	9.9
2022–23	Cornell	28	8	20.0	.559	.297	.753	3.6	2.3	**2.3**	.5	11.0
2023–24	Cornell	29	**28**	**22.2**	**.564**	**.338**	.713	**4.0**	**3.0**	2.2	.6	**12.5**
2024–25	Vanderbilt	**33**	26	18.2	.533	.235	**.783**	3.7	1.3	1.7	**1.0**	6.6
Career		116	84	19.6	.535	.304	.728	3.8	2.1	2.0	.6	9.9
