= Caden Pierce =

American basketball player

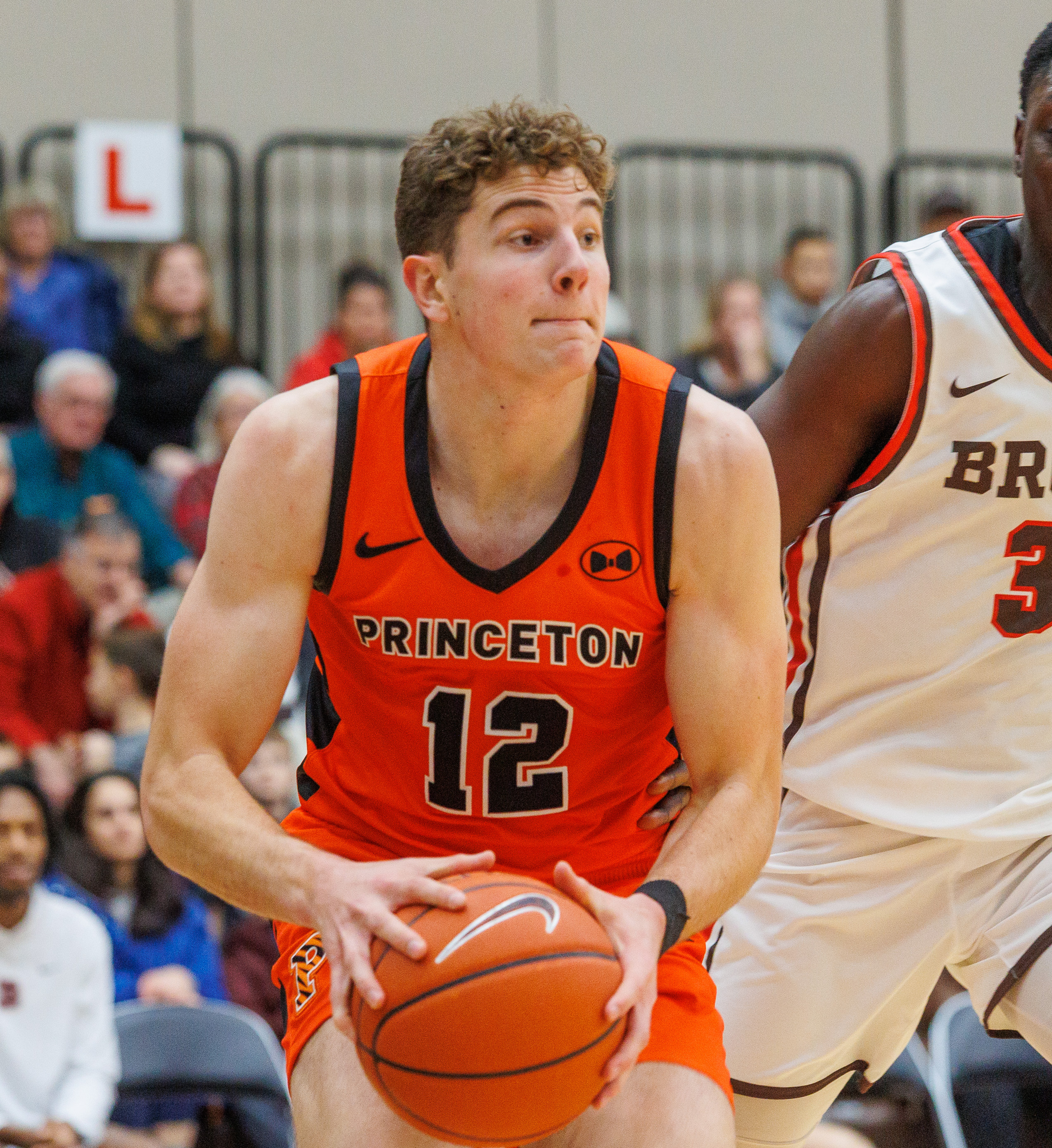
- Pierce with Princeton in 2023

No. 8 – Purdue Boilermakers
- Position: Power forward
- League: Big 10 Conference

Personal information
- Listed height: 6 ft 7 in (2.01 m)
- Listed weight: 220 lb (100 kg)

Career information
- High school: Glenbard West (Glen Ellyn, Illinois)
- College: Princeton (2022–2026); Purdue (2026–present)

Career highlights
- Ivy League Player of the Year (2024); First-team All-Ivy League (2024); Second-team All-Ivy League (2025); Ivy League Rookie of the Year (2023)

Caden Pierce is an American college basketball player for the Purdue Boilermakers of the Big Ten Conference. He last played for the Princeton Tigers and was named the 2024 Ivy League Player of the Year.

== Early life and high school career ==
Pierce grew up in Glen Ellyn, Illinois and attended Glenbard West High School. He averaged 12.7 points, 5.3 rebounds, 3.9 assists, 3.2 steals, and 4.5 blocks per game as a senior as the Hilltoppers went 37–1 and won the Class 4A IHSA State Championship. Pierce committed to playing college basketball for Princeton over offers from Loyola (Maryland) and St. Thomas (Minnesota). He also played golf at Glenbard West and was an All-West Suburban Conference as a junior and senior.

== College career ==
Pierce entered his freshman season at Princeton as the Tigers' starting small forward. He was named the Ivy League Rookie of the Year at the end of the season. Pierce led the Tigers with eight rebounds in the team's 59–55 upset win over 2-seed Arizona in the first round of the 2023 NCAA tournament. He made two free throws at the end of the game. He scored nine points and grabbed 16 rebounds in Princeton's second round 78–63 win over Missouri. As a freshman, Pierce averaged 8.2 points, 7.3 rebounds, and 1.2 assists per game and won the Ivy League Rookie of the Year. He entered the transfer portal and chose Purdue University. He will be a redshirt senior in the 2026–2027 season.

== Career statistics ==
Legend
GP	Games played	GS	Games started	MPG	Minutes per game
FG%	Field goal percentage	3P%	3-point field goal percentage	FT%	Free throw percentage
RPG	Rebounds per game	APG	Assists per game	SPG	Steals per game
BPG	Blocks per game	PPG	Points per game	**Bold**	Career high

=== College ===
Year	Team	GP	GS	MPG	FG%	3P%	FT%	RPG	APG	SPG	BPG	PPG
2022–23	Princeton	**32**	**31**	29.9	.426	.325	.650	7.3	1.2	.7	**.6**	8.2
2023-24	Princeton	29	29	**32.8**	**.546**	**.342**	**.767**	**9.2**	**3.2**	**1.2**	0.5	**16.6**
2024-25	Princeton	29	29	32.5	.465	.316	.653	7.2	**3.2**	1.0	0.4	11.2
2025-26	Princeton	Redshirt										

== Personal life ==
Both of Pierce's parents were athletes at Northwestern University, with his father playing football and his mother playing volleyball. His older brother, Alec Pierce, plays wide receiver in the National Football League for the Indianapolis Colts. Another brother, Justin, played college basketball at William & Mary and North Carolina and currently plays professionally in Europe.
