= John Poulakidas =

Greek-American basketball player (born 2003)

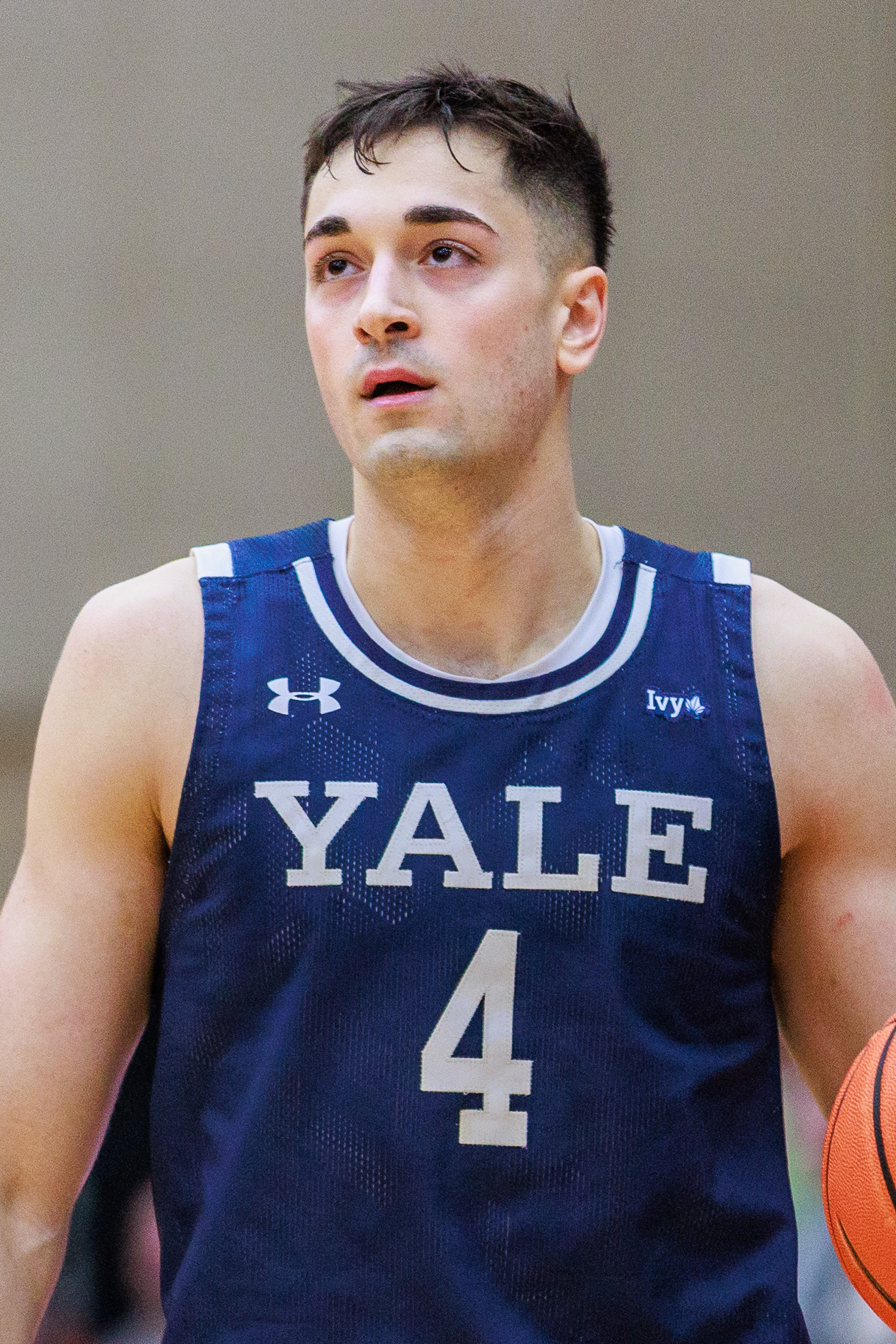
- Poulakidas with Yale in 2025

No. 25 – San Diego Clippers
- Position: Shooting guard
- League: NBA G League

Personal information
- Born: April 4, 2003 (age 23) Naperville, Illinois, U.S.
- Listed height: 6 ft 6 in (1.98 m)
- Listed weight: 205 lb (93 kg)

Career information
- High school: Neuqua Valley (Naperville, Illinois)
- College: Yale (2021–2025)
- NBA draft: 2025: undrafted
- Playing career: 2025–present

Career history
- 2025–2026: San Diego Clippers
- 2026: Dallas Mavericks
- 2026: →Texas Legends
- 2026–present: San Diego Clippers

Career highlights
- First-team All-Ivy League (2025); Second-team All-Ivy League (2024); Ivy League tournament MVP (2025)
- Stats at NBA.com
- Stats at Basketball Reference

John Michael Poulakidas (born April 4, 2003) is an American professional basketball player for the San Diego Clippers of the NBA G League. He played college basketball for the Yale Bulldogs.

== High school career ==
Poulakidas attended Neuqua Valley High School in Naperville, Illinois. As a junior, he averaged 17.5 points and 4.6 rebounds per game. He committed to play college basketball at Yale University over offers from Minnesota, Wake Forest, and Rutgers.

== College career ==
After playing sparingly as a freshman, Poulakidas started every game as a sophomore and junior. As a junior in the first round of the NCAA tournament against Auburn, he scored 28 points, making six three-pointers and helping lead Yale to a 78–76 upset victory. Poulakidas returned for his senior season, emerging as the team's leading scorer by averaging 19.4 points per game.

== Professional career ==
Poulakidas was not selected in the 2025 NBA draft. He signed an NBA Summer League contract with the Los Angeles Clippers.

On March 3, 2026, Poulakidas signed a two-way contract with the Dallas Mavericks. Immediately after his signing, that same day, he made his NBA debut, playing 14 minutes and 28 seconds of game time action in a 90–117 loss against the Charlotte Hornets; he grabbed five rebounds and dished out two assists. On April 12, Poulakidas put up a career-high 28 points in a 149–128 win over the Chicago Bulls.

On July 3, 2026, it was announced that Poulakidas would be participating with the Mavericks in the 2026 NBA Summer League. He was waived by the Mavericks on October 17, 2026.

On October 27, 2026, he joined the training camp roster for the San Diego Clippers of the NBA G League.

== Personal life ==
Poulakidas's parents are both Greek. "My father's parents are from Greece, my grandfather was born in Sparta, and grandmother is from the island of Chios. On my mom's side, both parents are from the Peloponnese, from a village called Rizes. All my grandparents are Greek, all my family and ancestry are Greek. I speak a little Greek, but I haven't learned it very well," he revealed in an interview with ERT3.

== Career statistics ==
Legend
| GP | Games played | GS | Games started | MPG | Minutes per game |
| FG% | Field goal percentage | 3P% | 3-point field goal percentage | FT% | Free throw percentage |
| RPG | Rebounds per game | APG | Assists per game | SPG | Steals per game |
| BPG | Blocks per game | PPG | Points per game | **Bold** | Career high |

=== NBA ===
| Year | Team | GP | GS | MPG | FG% | 3P% | FT% | RPG | APG | SPG | BPG | PPG |
|---|---|---|---|---|---|---|---|---|---|---|---|---|
| 2025–26 | Dallas | 13 | 0 | 19.5 | .429 | .403 | .857 | 2.3 | .8 | .5 | .3 | 8.8 |
| Career | | 13 | 0 | 19.5 | .429 | .403 | .857 | 2.3 | .8 | .5 | .3 | 8.8 |

=== College ===
| Year | Team | GP | GS | MPG | FG% | 3P% | FT% | RPG | APG | SPG | BPG | PPG |
|---|---|---|---|---|---|---|---|---|---|---|---|---|
| 2021–22 | Yale | 20 | 0 | 5.1 | .378 | .316 | 1.000 | .5 | .1 | .1 | .1 | 1.9 |
| 2022–23 | Yale | 30 | 30 | 29.2 | .416 | .401 | .810 | 3.2 | 1.4 | .6 | .4 | 12.0 |
| 2023–24 | Yale | 33 | 33 | 30.9 | .447 | .405 | .766 | 2.3 | 1.9 | .5 | .4 | 13.4 |
| 2024–25 | Yale | 27 | 27 | 31.6 | .451 | .408 | .897 | 3.3 | 1.3 | .6 | .1 | 19.4 |
