= 2024 Ivy League men's basketball tournament =

American college basketball tournament

- Classification: Division I
- Season: 2023–24
- Teams: 4
- Site: Levien Gymnasium; New York City
- Champions: Yale (3rd title)
- Winning coach: James Jones (3rd title)
- Attendance: 7,495 (total); 2,278 (championship)
- Television: ESPNU, ESPNews, ESPN2

2023–24 Ivy League men's basketball standings
	Conf.				Overall
Team	W		L	PCT	W		L	PCT
Princeton	12	–	2	.857	24	–	5	.828
Yale †	11	–	3	.786	23	–	10	.697
Cornell	11	–	3	.786	22	–	8	.733
Brown	8	–	6	.571	13	–	18	.419
Harvard	5	–	9	.357	14	–	13	.519
Columbia	4	–	10	.286	13	–	14	.481
Penn	3	–	11	.214	11	–	18	.379
Dartmouth	2	–	12	.143	6	–	21	.222
† 2024 Ivy League tournament winner

The 2024 Ivy League men's basketball tournament, popularly referred to as "Ivy Madness", was the postseason men's basketball tournament for the Ivy League of the 2023–24 NCAA Division I men's basketball season. It was held March 16 and 17, 2024, at the Levien Gymnasium on the campus of Columbia University in New York City. The winner, Yale, received the Ivy League's automatic bid to the 2024 NCAA Tournament.

== Seeds ==
The top four teams in the Ivy League regular-season standings qualified for the tournament and were seeded according to their records in conference play, resulting in a Shaughnessy playoff. If a tie for any of the top four positions exists, tiebreakers are applied in the following order:

- Head-to-head record between teams involved in the tie.
- Record against the top team(s) not involved in the tie in order of conference record, going down through the seedings until the tie is broken.
- Average of the teams' ranking in the following computer systems: NCAA NET, Sagarin, KenPom, and ESPN Basketball Percentage Index.

Seed	School	Record	Tiebreaker
1	Princeton	12–2	
2	Yale	11–3	NET Ranking 86
3	Cornell	11–3	NET Ranking 88
4	Brown	8–6	
DNQ	Harvard	5–9	
DNQ	Columbia	4–10	
DNQ	Penn	3–11	
DNQ	Dartmouth	2–12	

== Schedule ==
Session	Game	Time	Matchup	Score	Television	Attendance
Semifinals – Saturday, March 16
1	1	11:00 am	No. 1 Princeton vs. No. 4 Brown	81–90	ESPNU	2,612
1	2	2:00 pm	No. 2 Yale vs. No. 3 Cornell	69–57	ESPNews	2,605
Championship – Sunday, March 17
2	3	12:00 pm	No. 4 Brown vs. No. 2 Yale	61–62	ESPN2	2,278
Game times in Eastern Time. Rankings denote tournament seeding.

== Bracket ==
Semifinals; Saturday, March 16; ESPNU; ESPNews
1	Princeton	81
4	Brown	90
2	Yale	69
3	Cornell	57

Championship; Sunday, March 17; ESPN2
4	Brown	61
2	Yale	62

== See also ==
- 2024 Ivy League women's basketball tournament
