= 2025 National Invitation Tournament =

Men's college basketball tournament

- Season: 2024–25
- Teams: 32
- Finals site: Hinkle Fieldhouse, Indianapolis, Indiana
- Champions: Chattanooga (1st title)
- Runner-up: UC Irvine (1st title game)
- Semifinalists: Loyola Chicago (3rd semifinal); North Texas (2nd semifinal)
- Winning coach: Dan Earl (1st title)
- MVP: Trey Bonham (Chattanooga)

The 2025 National Invitation Tournament (NIT) was a single-elimination tournament of thirty-two NCAA Division I men's college basketball teams not selected to participate in the 2025 NCAA tournament. The tournament commenced on March 18 and concluded on April 3. The first three rounds were played on campus sites, with the semifinal and final rounds played at Hinkle Fieldhouse in Indianapolis.

Six programs made their debut in the NIT: Cal State Northridge, Jacksonville State, North Alabama, Northern Colorado, Samford, and UC Riverside.

The University of Tennessee–Chattanooga Mocs defeated the University of California–Irvine Anteaters 85–84 in overtime to claim the championship. The All-Tournament Team was composed of Trey Bonham (Chattanooga), Justin Hohn (UC Irvine), Honor Huff (Chattanooga), Devin Tillis (UC Irvine) and Atin Wright (North Texas); Bonham was also selected Most Outstanding Player.

== Participants ==
Teams and pairings for the 2025 NIT were released by the NIT Committee on March 16, 2025. Thirty-two teams qualified for the NIT, including exempt qualifiers, automatic qualifiers, and at-large selections. In 2024, the Seton Hall Pirates won the NIT championship.

Non-NCAA tournament teams from the Big East, Big Ten and Big 12 conferences were contractually prohibited from playing in any other postseason tournament, including the NIT, if they declined an invitation or removed themselves from consideration for a bid to the College Basketball Crown.

=== Exempt qualifiers ===
For the 2025 NIT, exempt bids were extended to two teams from the Atlantic Coast (ACC) and Southeastern (SEC) conferences, plus one team each from the top twelve conferences (potentially excluding the ACC and SEC) as rated by the Pomeroy College Basketball Ratings (KenPom) on March 16, 2025. The twelve conferences that earned exempt bids based on their KenPom ratings were

- American Athletic (AAC, The American)
- Atlantic 10 (A–10)
- Big East
- Big Ten
- Big 12
- Big West
- Conference USA (CUSA)
- Ivy
- Missouri Valley (MVC)
- Mountain West (MWC)
- West Coast (WCC)
- Western Athletic (WAC)

Whether the twelve exempt-bid conferences excluded or included the ACC and SEC is unclear. Multiple sources indicated that there would be sixteen exempt bids extended. This would be possible only if four exempt bids were extended collectively to the ACC and SEC, and twelve other exempt bids were extended. Nevertheless, two days before NIT selections were to be made, a tweet from the NIT's account included a graphic purporting to show the twelve conferences that were then leading in the KenPom ratings, and those twelve conferences included the ACC and SEC. This would result in only fourteen exempt bids if the ACC and SEC could not receive a third exempt bid by being in the top twelve conferences. A CBS Sports article in which the tweet was embedded maintained there would be sixteen exempt bids. The two conferences listed above that were excluded from the graphic were the Ivy and the WAC. Because the tweet is the only source indicating the ACC and SEC were taken into account when ranking the top twelve conferences, it may have been erroneous. Had the SEC been eligible for a third exempt bid, it would not have been able to receive it, as only two of its members failed to qualify for the NCAA tournament.

Further, it appears that Utah Valley, the team entitled to the WAC's exempt bid, could not host due to scheduling issues with their arena, which would mean the WAC did earn an exempt bid. However, local media reporting Utah Valley's NIT bid merely speculated and did not express certainty regarding why they were playing on the road. The Utah Valley athletics website offered no explanation for the team opening the NIT away from home. Without a definitive statement from the NCAA, the status of teams participating in the tournament as either exempt or at large remains unclear. If the WAC did not have an exempt bid, Utah Valley earned an automatic bid, because they were the WAC regular-season champion, did not win the conference tournament, and had a KNIT score better than 125.

The teams accepting exempt bids are shown below. No schools from the Big East, Big Ten, Ivy, or SEC accepted invitations, creating five additional at-large berths.

Team	Conference	Overall record	Appearance	Last bid
North Texas	AAC	24–8 (.750)	4th	2024
SMU	ACC	23–10 (.697)	7th	2024
Stanford	ACC	20–13 (.606)	10th	2018
George Mason	A–10	26–8 (.765)	5th	2009
Oklahoma State	Big 12	15–17 (.469)	14th	2023
UC Irvine	Big West	28–6 (.824)	9th	2024
Middle Tennessee	CUSA	22–11 (.667)	5th	2018
Bradley	MVC	26–8 (.765)	24th	2024
San Jose State	MWC	15–19 (.441)	2nd	1981
San Francisco	WCC	24–9 (.727)	8th	2024
Utah Valley †	WAC	25–8 (.758)	3rd	2023
† Utah Valley declined hosting a first-round game due to scheduling issues at the UCCU Center. As described above, whether Utah Valley's inclusion in the field was as an automatic versus exempt qualifier is uncertain.

The final KNIT (average of Bart Torvik "T-Rank" Ranking (BTR), ESPN Basketball Power Index (BPI), Ken Pomeroy Rating (KPR), Kevin Pauga Index (KPI), NCAA Evaluation Tool (NET), Strength of Record (SOR) ranking, and Wins Above Bubble (WAB) ranking) scores of non-NCAA tournament teams from conferences that earned exempt bids through the close of play on March 16, 2025 (Selection Sunday) are summarized in the tables below. Teams in bold accepted a bid; teams in italics were extended an automatic bid but rejected it. Some Big East, Big Ten, and Big 12 teams were contractually obligated to decline.

Atlantic Coast Conference
Team	BTR	BPI	KPR	KPI	NET	SOR	WAB	KNIT
**SMU**	47	45	47	62	46	51	57	51
Wake Forest	70	62	71	59	69	44	48	60
Pittsburgh	72	50	61	92	61	79	85	71
**Stanford**	75	88	82	76	81	70	72	78
Florida State	93	86	89	123	90	93	111	98
Georgia Tech	90	94	94	122	109	94	112	102
Virginia	96	100	104	124	110	100	117	107
Notre Dame	97	89	96	146	103	117	138	112
Syracuse	107	97	117	147	133	123	152	125
California	121	104	112	154	125	140	158	131
NC State	115	93	125	179	132	148	177	138
Virginia Tech	144	122	161	166	167	147	182	156
Boston College	172	161	184	203	202	166	196	183
Miami (FL)	185	119	192	251	225	188	269	204

Southeastern Conference
Team	BTR	BPI	KPR	KPI	NET	SOR	WAB	KNIT
LSU	84	74	88	105	89	85	87	87
South Carolina	76	79	69	106	87	109	119	92

American Athletic Conference
Team	BTR	BPI	KPR	KPI	NET	SOR	WAB	KNIT
**North Texas**	73	80	72	73	65	63	66	70
UAB	101	99	103	100	106	115	124	107
Florida Atlantic	111	102	115	139	111	138	157	125
Wichita State	140	120	135	140	134	129	145	135
Tulane	138	127	138	174	145	154	174	150
Temple	157	142	171	181	164	165	191	167
East Carolina	182	159	176	162	176	156	178	170
South Florida	201	147	195	207	189	188	245	196
UTSA	181	186	191	227	201	188	250	203
Rice	179	194	189	281	204	188	280	216
Tulsa	240	235	268	262	271	188	287	250
Charlotte	262	219	257	276	267	188	319	255

Atlantic 10 Conference
Team	BTR	BPI	KPR	KPI	NET	SOR	WAB	KNIT
**George Mason**	71	69	78	47	68	53	55	63
Dayton	78	72	74	51	67	58	62	66
Saint Joseph's	82	71	79	64	76	92	106	81
St. Bonaventure	92	110	102	84	97	87	88	94
Loyola Chicago	98	101	108	78	107	95	101	98
Saint Louis	108	108	106	85	101	121	131	109
George Washington	116	116	113	119	124	126	134	121
Rhode Island	160	135	150	127	152	139	154	145
Davidson	142	130	148	157	153	163	181	153
Duquesne	123	118	132	145	149	188	251	158
La Salle	209	165	222	173	214	188	230	200
UMass	212	192	214	204	221	188	267	214
Fordham	216	213	229	209	239	188	278	225
Richmond	224	223	238	221	253	188	296	235

Big East Conference
Team	BTR	BPI	KPR	KPI	NET	SOR	WAB	KNIT
Villanova†	52	41	56	95	55	61	75	62
Butler†	77	65	77	135	83	97	123	94
Georgetown†	94	84	87	129	88	82	103	95
Providence	104	83	97	149	100	131	169	119
DePaul†	112	105	118	170	119	118	149	127
Seton Hall	217	150	206	240	211	188	259	210
† Offered a bid or preemptively declined the opportunity to play in the CBC and was thereby contractually forbidden from playing in the NIT.

Big Ten Conference
Team	BTR	BPI	KPR	KPI	NET	SOR	WAB	KNIT
Ohio State†	41	37	39	53	41	56	59	47
Indiana†	55	52	48	36	54	50	50	49
Nebraska†	62	55	54	55	59	60	61	58.0
Northwestern†	54	47	45	65	53	71	73	58.3
Iowa†	66	59	64	79	63	69	69	67
USC†	59	60	63	69	70	83	86	70
Penn State†	64	58	60	86	66	80	84	71
Rutgers†	68	76	75	83	77	77	83	77
Minnesota	86	90	90	67	96	89	97	88
Washington	118	107	109	109	117	105	118	112
† Offered a bid or preemptively declined the opportunity to play in the CBC and was thereby contractually forbidden from playing in the NIT.

Big 12 Conference
Team	BTR	BPI	KPR	KPI	NET	SOR	WAB	KNIT
West Virginia‡	34	51	53	48	51	42	41	46
Cincinnati‡	44	40	55	66	50	59	60	53
Kansas State†, ‡	57	63	67	74	75	72	71	68
UCF†, ‡	69	64	68	75	71	65	67	68
TCU‡	74	67	86	70	78	68	63	72
Utah‡	67	61	76	96	73	75	76	74.9
Arizona State‡	65	77	70	82	74	81	78	75.3
Colorado‡	81	82	81	101	86	91	95	88
**Oklahoma State**	87	103	100	112	95	76	82	94
† Teams finished with identical KNIT scores. ‡ Offered a bid or preemptively declined the opportunity to play in the CBC and was thereby contractually forbidden from playing in the NIT.

Big West Conference
Team	BTR	BPI	KPR	KPI	NET	SOR	WAB	KNIT
**UC Irvine**	80	95	66	41	62	57	51	65
Cal State Northridge	128	133	107	117	104	120	108	117
UC Riverside	151	200	145	98	142	119	105	137
UC Santa Barbara	147	157	147	160	140	170	156	154
Cal Poly	178	236	181	177	180	188	225	195
Hawaii	231	256	224	200	223	188	216	220
UC Davis	244	259	246	205	237	188	220	228
Cal State Bakersfield	255	254	239	235	244	188	273	241
Long Beach State	309	324	303	324	326	188	336	301
Cal State Fullerton	354	355	351	329	348	188	341	324

Conference USA
Team	BTR	BPI	KPR	KPI	NET	SOR	WAB	KNIT
**Middle Tennessee**	120	141	119	72	105	111	92	109
Jacksonville State	132	153	123	90	122	135	115	124
Louisiana Tech	134	140	126	103	126	150	129	130
Kennesaw State	124	185	130	102	137	158	141	140
New Mexico State	105	164	131	131	144	179	167	146
UTEP	143	196	158	128	157	175	165	160
Western Kentucky	159	198	159	132	159	174	163	163
Sam Houston	155	205	175	178	178	188	233	187
FIU	266	292	254	270	260	188	330	266

Ivy League
Team	BTR	BPI	KPR	KPI	NET	SOR	WAB	KNIT
Cornell	125	117	128	141	120	134	142	130
Princeton	206	132	178	118	166	125	127	150
Brown	201	191	208	189	215	170	172	192
Dartmouth	176	187	205	219	209	188	208	199
Harvard	238	246	255	222	256	188	214	231
Columbia	299	241	277	268	272	188	222	252
Penn	303	271	291	279	304	188	276	273
As described above, the Ivy League's status as an exempt-bid conference is uncertain.

Missouri Valley Conference
Team	BTR	BPI	KPR	KPI	NET	SOR	WAB	KNIT
**Bradley**	99	92	95	56	80	73	68	80
Northern Iowa	117	113	101	80	93	141	136	112
Belmont	130	162	129	93	129	116	116	125
Illinois State	131	124	140	121	121	155	162	136
Murray State	162	121	142	138	146	188	210	158
UIC	191	154	174	130	154	153	166	160
Southern Illinois	180	207	193	186	195	188	255	201
Indiana State	203	182	201	210	205	188	244	205
Valparaiso	219	203	212	199	206	188	256	212
Missouri State	207	237	245	269	245	188	328	246
Evansville	261	269	262	233	257	188	299	253

Mountain West Conference
Team	BTR	BPI	KPR	KPI	NET	SOR	WAB	KNIT
Boise State	50	48	50	50	44	55	52	50
UNLV	89	96	92	97	98	103	110	98
Nevada	88	78	80	126	79	128	128	101
**San Jose State**	152	181	165	194	175	179	203	178
Wyoming	189	199	185	217	197	188	212	198
Fresno State	258	274	256	287	278	188	317	265
Air Force	289	304	310	312	323	188	340	295

West Coast Conference
Team	BTR	BPI	KPR	KPI	NET	SOR	WAB	KNIT
**San Francisco**	61	75	65	58	64	54	54	62
Santa Clara	51	70	57	61	57	88	81	66
Oregon State	91	98	85	113	85	108	94	96
Washington State	106	114	124	116	112	106	107	112
Loyola Marymount	148	169	155	153	162	161	137	155
Pepperdine	198	238	216	254	227	188	243	223
Portland	251	310	269	265	288	188	249	260
Pacific	279	316	283	309	295	188	309	283
San Diego	292	322	296	341	324	188	344	301

Western Athletic Conference
Team	BTR	BPI	KPR	KPI	NET	SOR	WAB	KNIT
**Utah Valley**	110	126	114	120	108	86	79	106
Seattle	139	144	146	212	155	188	239	175
California Baptist	156	166	167	190	172	188	190	176
Abilene Christian	200	244	219	238	228	188	206	218
UT Arlington	239	210	226	271	231	188	252	231
Tarleton	285	294	286	278	302	188	263	271
Southern Utah	325	306	295	304	306	188	270	285
Utah Tech	298	318	301	335	309	188	346	299
As described above, the Western Athletic Conference's status as an exempt-bid conference is uncertain.

All exempt qualifiers were given the opportunity to host first-round games.

=== Automatic qualifiers ===
Additionally, automatic bids were given to regular-season conference champions with an average ranking (or "KNIT" score) of 125 or better across the BTR, BPI, KPR, KPI, NET, SOR and WAB rankings.

The final KNIT scores through the close of play on March 15, 2025 (the morning of Selection Sunday), of teams that were conference regular-season champions, failed to win their conference tournament and are not from conferences receiving an exempt bid are summarized in the table below.

Team	Conference	BTR	BPI	KPR	KPI	NET	SOR	WAB	KNIT
Bucknell	Patriot	214	215	225	243	213	188	205	215
Central Connecticut	Northeast	194	167	183	183	168	113	104	159
Chattanooga	Southern	135	134	110	88	115	96	89	110
Northern Colorado	Big Sky	119	128	122	143	114	110	91	118
Quinnipiac	Metro Atlantic Athletic	210	202	213	195	191	179	187	197
South Alabama	Sun Belt	136	138	121	158	123	136	135	135
Southeast Missouri State	Ohio Valley	197	243	204	198	188	188	175	199
Southern	Southwestern Athletic	215	220	233	228	224	179	143	206
Towson	Coastal Athletic	168	145	154	114	151	124	122	140

Teams qualifying for and accepting automatic bids were as follows:

Team	Conference	Overall record	Appearance	Last bid
Chattanooga	SoCon	24–9 (.727)	5th	1987
Northern Colorado	Big Sky	25–9 (.735)	1st	Never

=== At-large bids ===
The following teams were awarded at-large bids.

Team	Conference	Overall record	Appearance	Last bid
Arkansas State	Sun Belt	24–10 (.706)	5th	1991
Cal State Northridge	Big West	22–10 (.688)	1st	Never
Dayton	Atlantic 10	22–10 (.688)	28th	2022
Florida Atlantic	American	18–15 (.545)	2nd	2011
Furman	Southern	25–9 (.735)	3rd	2019
Georgia Tech	ACC	17–16 (.515)	10th	2017
Jacksonville State	Conference USA	22–12 (.647)	1st	Never
Kent State	Mid-American	22–11 (.667)	10th	2011
Loyola Chicago	Atlantic 10	22–11 (.667)	7th	2024
North Alabama	ASUN	24–10 (.706)	1st	Never
Northern Iowa	Missouri Valley	20–12 (.625)	3rd	2022
Saint Louis	Atlantic 10	19–14 (.576)	21st	2022
Saint Joseph's	Atlantic 10	22–12 (.647)	18th	2024
Samford	Southern	22–10 (.688)	1st	Never
Santa Clara	West Coast	20–12 (.625)	7th	2023
St. Bonaventure	Atlantic 10	22–11 (.667)	18th	2022
UAB	American	22–12 (.647)	14th	2023
UC Riverside	Big West	21–12 (.636)	1st	Never
Wichita State	American	19–14 (.576)	14th	2019

The NCAA caused confusion on Selection Sunday, by failing to communicate with at least one program invited to the NIT prior to the initial release of the bracket. Instead, it appears the NCAA assumed that mid-major schools would not decline an NIT bid. UC Riverside had already confirmed their participation in the 2025 College Basketball Invitational, before learning they had been invited to the NIT. For a brief time, NIT and CBI brackets co-existed showing UC Riverside playing in both tournaments. Participation in multiple postseason tournaments is not permitted under NCAA rules. After UC Riverside's commitment to play in the CBI came to the attention of the NCAA, instead of communicating with UC Riverside, they contacted South Alabama, the top remaining at-large team, and extended an NIT invitation to them. As the NCAA was communicating with South Alabama, UC Riverside was in contact with CBI organizers to decline their invitation to that tournament, so they could play in the NIT. After their commitment to the CBI was dissolved, UC Riverside contacted the NCAA and accepted their bid to the NIT. Just an hour after extending the invitation, the NCAA contacted South Alabama and informed them their bid to the NIT had been revoked.

=== Declined bids ===
==== Teams contractually obligated to decline ====
Teams from the Big East, Big Ten and Big 12 conferences that were offered a bid or preemptively declined the opportunity to play in the 2025 College Basketball Crown were thereby contractually forbidden from playing in the NIT. Teams that fulfilled their obligations to decline were:

- Arizona State†
- Butler†
- Cincinnati†
- Colorado†
- DePaul†
- Georgetown†
- Indiana
- Iowa
- Kansas State
- Nebraska†
- Northwestern
- Ohio State
- Penn State
- Rutgers
- TCU
- UCF†
- USC†
- Utah†
- Villanova†
- West Virginia

==== Other teams declining bids ====
- Boise State†
- Florida State
- LSU
- Minnesota
- Nevada
- Pittsburgh
- Providence
- Seton Hall
- South Carolina
- UNLV
- Wake Forest
- Washington

† Participated in 2025 College Basketball Crown.

==== Ivy League teams ====
As described in detail above, it is unclear whether the Ivy League was an exempt-bid conference. If it was, all seven of its non-NCAA tournament teams declined bids to the NIT, since no Ivy League teams participated.

== Field synopsis ==
Rankings, ratings and records were through March 16, 2025 Selection Sunday and prior to any additional post-season activity. This also includes a "KNIT" score, which is leveraged as a criteria and evaluation tool for the National Invitation Tournament selection committee; it average of the following seven metrics, then ranks based on the results:

- BTR: Bart Torvik "T-Rank" Ranking
- BPI: ESPN Basketball Power Index
- KPR: Ken Pomeroy College Basketball Ratings (aka "KenPom")
- KPI: Kevin Pauga Index
- NET: NCAA Evaluation Tool
- SOR: Strength Of Record, as calculated by ESPN
- WAB: Wins Above Bubble, as calculated by Bart Torvik

Bid	Seed	KNIT	School	Conference	Conference Place	Conference W–L	Division I W–L	Overall W–L	BTR	BPI	KPR	KPI	NET	SOR	WAB	Road W–L	Neutral W–L	Home W–L	Quad 1 W–L	Quad 2 W–L	Quad 3 W–L	Quad 4 W–L	Non D-I W–L
Exempt	1	53	SMU	Atlantic Coast	T–4th	13–7 (.650)	23–10 (.697)	23–10 (.697)	47	45	47	62	46	51	58	7–4 (.636)	4–1 (.800)	12–5 (.706)	0–5 (.000)	6–5 (.545)	12–0 (1.000)	5–0 (1.000)	0–0 (–)
Exempt	1	58	San Francisco	West Coast	3rd	13–5 (.722)	23–9 (.719)	24–9 (.727)	61	75	65	58	64	54	52	5–5 (.500)	3–2 (.600)	16–2 (.889)	1–6 (.143)	3–3 (.500)	8–0 (1.000)	11–0 (1.000)	1–0 (1.000)
Exempt	2	61	George Mason	Atlantic 10	T–1st	15–3 (.833)	25–8 (.758)	26–8 (.765)	71	69	78	47	68	53	56	7–6 (.538)	2–1 (.667)	17–1 (.944)	1–4 (.200)	4–0 (1.000)	9–3 (.750)	11–1 (.917)	1–0 (1.000)
Exempt	1	63	UC Irvine	Big West	2nd	17–3 (.850)	27–6 (.818)	28–6 (.824)	80	95	66	41	62	57	54	14–3 (.824)	4–1 (.800)	10–2 (.833)	1–1 (.500)	3–2 (.600)	12–3 (.800)	11–0 (1.000)	1–0 (1.000)
At-Large	1	64	Dayton	Atlantic 10	T–3rd	12–6 (.667)	21–10 (.677)	22–10 (.688)	78	72	74	51	67	58	62	5–4 (.556)	1–4 (.200)	16–2 (.889)	3–3 (.500)	2–6 (.250)	10–1 (.909)	6–0 (1.000)	1–0 (1.000)
At-Large	2	66	Santa Clara	West Coast	4th	12–6 (.667)	20–12 (.625)	20–12 (.625)	51	70	57	61	57	88	84	6–5 (.545)	3–3 (.500)	11–4 (.733)	2–4 (.333)	4–3 (.571)	5–4 (.556)	9–1 (.900)	0–0 (–)
Exempt	2	70	North Texas	American Athletic	2nd	14–4 (.778)	22–8 (.733)	24–8 (.750)	73	80	72	73	65	63	68	7–5 (.583)	2–2 (.500)	15–1 (.938)	0–3 (.000)	4–2 (.667)	9–2 (.818)	9–1 (.900)	2–0 (1.000)
Exempt	2	79	Stanford	Atlantic Coast	7th	11–9 (.550)	20–13 (.606)	20–13 (.606)	75	88	82	76	81	70	73	3–8 (.273)	1–3 (.250)	16–2 (.889)	2–8 (.200)	2–4 (.333)	7–0 (1.000)	9–1 (.900)	0–0 (–)
Exempt	3	80	Bradley	Missouri Valley	2nd	15–5 (.750)	25–8 (.758)	26–8 (.765)	99	92	95	56	80	73	69	8–3 (.727)	5–2 (.714)	13–3 (.813)	1–0 (1.000)	2–6 (.250)	11–2 (.846)	11–0 (1.000)	1–0 (1.000)
At-Large	3	81	Saint Joseph's	Atlantic 10	T–5th	11–7 (.611)	22–12 (.647)	22–12 (.647)	82	71	79	64	76	92	111	4–6 (.400)	5–2 (.714)	13–4 (.765)	1–3 (.250)	3–4 (.429)	8–3 (.727)	10–2 (.833)	0–0 (–)
Exempt	4	89	Oklahoma State	Big 12	T–12th	7–13 (.350)	15–17 (.469)	15–17 (.469)	87	103	100	112	95	76	85	2–10 (.167)	1–4 (.200)	12–3 (.800)	1–14 (.067)	5–2 (.714)	3–1 (.750)	6–0 (1.000)	0–0 (–)
At-Large	3	91	St. Bonaventure	Atlantic 10	T–7th	9–9 (.500)	21–11 (.656)	22–11 (.667)	92	110	102	84	97	87	91	7–6 (.538)	3–2 (.600)	12–3 (.800)	0–3 (.000)	4–4 (.500)	9–3 (.750)	8–1 (.889)	1–0 (1.000)
At-Large	3	93	Arkansas State	Sun Belt	T–1st	13–5 (.722)	23–10 (.697)	24–10 (.706)	95	91	91	89	94	104	108	8–5 (.615)	3–3 (.500)	13–2 (.867)	1–1 (.500)	2–3 (.400)	4–4 (.500)	16–2 (.889)	1–0 (1.000)
At-Large		98	Loyola Chicago	Atlantic 10	T–3rd	12–6 (.667)	21–11 (.656)	22–11 (.667)	98	101	108	78	107	95	103	5–5 (.500)	1–5 (.167)	16–1 (.941)	0–3 (.000)	1–4 (.200)	11–4 (.733)	9–0 (1.000)	1–0 (1.000)
At-Large	4	100	Georgia Tech	Atlantic Coast	8th	10–10 (.500)	17–16 (.515)	17–16 (.515)	90	94	94	121	109	94	113	2–9 (.182)	1–2 (.333)	14–5 (.737)	3–7 (.300)	0–7 (.000)	5–1 (.833)	9–1 (.900)	0–0 (–)
At-Large		102	UAB	American Athletic	3rd	13–5 (.722)	21–12 (.636)	22–12 (.647)	102	99	103	102	106	115	119	5–5 (.500)	3–3 (.500)	14–4 (.778)	0–3 (.000)	4–2 (.667)	5–5 (.500)	12–2 (.857)	1–0 (1.000)
Automatic/ Exempt †		104	Utah Valley	Western Athletic	1st	15–1 (.938)	23–8 (.742)	25–8 (.758)	110	126	114	120	108	86	87	10–6 (.625)	3–2 (.600)	12–0 (1.000)	0–0 (–)	0–5 (.000)	10–2 (.833)	13–1 (.929)	2–0 (1.000)
At-Large		105	Saint Louis	Atlantic 10	T–5th	11–7 (.611)	17–14 (.548)	19–14 (.576)	108	108	106	85	101	121	133	4–8 (.333)	1–3 (.250)	14–3 (.824)	0–3 (.000)	1–8 (.111)	9–3 (.750)	7–0 (1.000)	2–0 (1.000)
Automatic		106	Chattanooga	Southern	1st	15–3 (.833)	22–9 (.710)	24–9 (.727)	135	134	110	87	115	96	88	10–5 (.667)	1–1 (.500)	13–3 (.813)	0–3 (.000)	3–0 (1.000)	7–4 (.636)	12–2 (.857)	2–0 (1.000)
At-Large		107	Northern Iowa	Missouri Valley	3rd	14–6 (.700)	19–12 (.613)	20–12 (.625)	117	113	101	80	93	141	129	5–5 (.500)	1–4 (.200)	14–3 (.824)	0–1 (.000)	2–6 (.250)	10–4 (.714)	7–1 (.875)	1–0 (1.000)
Exempt	4	109	Middle Tennessee	Conference USA	T–2nd	12–6 (.667)	20–11 (.645)	22–11 (.667)	120	141	119	72	105	111	110	8–5 (.615)	3–2 (.600)	11–4 (.733)	0–2 (.000)	1–5 (.167)	14–4 (.778)	5–0 (1.000)	2–0 (1.000)
At-Large		112	Samford	Southern	T–3rd	12–6 (.667)	20–10 (.667)	22–10 (.688)	137	115	116	99	116	112	106	9–6 (.600)	0–1 (.000)	13–3 (.813)	0–2 (.000)	3–2 (.600)	5–6 (.455)	12–0 (1.000)	2–0 (1.000)
At-Large		113	Furman	Southern	5th	11–7 (.611)	22–9 (.710)	25–9 (.735)	141	136	137	81	127	99	94	9–5 (.643)	3–1 (.750)	13–3 (.813)	0–1 (.000)	3–1 (.750)	7–6 (.538)	12–1 (.923)	3–0 (1.000)
At-Large		114	Cal State Northridge	Big West	T–3rd	14–6 (.700)	20–10 (.667)	22–10 (.688)	128	133	107	117	104	120	107	10–6 (.625)	2–1 (.667)	10–3 (.769)	1–2 (.333)	0–3 (.000)	6–4 (.600)	13–1 (.929)	2–0 (1.000)
Automatic		116	Northern Colorado	Big Sky	T–1st	15–3 (.833)	22–9 (.710)	25–9 (.735)	119	128	122	143	114	110	104	9–6 (.600)	3–1 (.750)	13–2 (.867)	0–1 (.000)	0–2 (.000)	6–5 (.545)	16–1 (.941)	3–0 (1.000)
At-Large		119	Florida Atlantic	American Athletic	T–5th	10–8 (.556)	17–15 (.531)	18–15 (.545)	111	102	115	139	111	138	157	6–7 (.462)	4–3 (.571)	8–5 (.615)	0–4 (.000)	2–4 (.333)	3–5 (.375)	12–2 (.857)	1–0 (1.000)
At-Large		121	Jacksonville State	Conference USA	T–2nd	12–6 (.667)	19–12 (.613)	22–12 (.647)	132	153	123	90	122	135	123	7–7 (.500)	3–3 (.500)	12–2 (.857)	0–2 (.000)	2–3 (.400)	11–5 (.688)	6–2 (.750)	3–0 (1.000)
At-Large		124	Kent State	Mid-American	3rd	11–7 (.611)	20–11 (.645)	22–11 (.667)	127	129	136	115	128	130	121	8–5 (.615)	3–2 (.600)	11–4 (.733)	0–2 (.000)	0–2 (.000)	5–5 (.500)	15–2 (.882)	2–0 (1.000)
At-Large		125	North Alabama	Atlantic Sun	T–1st	14–4 (.778)	22–10 (.688)	24–10 (.706)	113	155	111	144	113	132	120	7–9 (.438)	1–0 (1.000)	16–1 (.941)	0–1 (.000)	0–3 (.000)	2–6 (.250)	20–0 (1.000)	2–0 (1.000)
At-Large		134	Wichita State	American Athletic	8th	8–10 (.444)	18–14 (.563)	19–14 (.576)	140	120	135	140	134	129	145	5–6 (.455)	3–2 (.600)	11–6 (.647)	0–4 (.000)	4–2 (.667)	8–3 (.727)	6–5 (.545)	1–0 (1.000)
At-Large		135	UC Riverside	Big West	T–3rd	14–6 (.700)	19–12 (.613)	21–12 (.636)	151	200	145	98	142	119	96	7–10 (.412)	0–1 (.000)	14–1 (.933)	1–5 (.167)	3–1 (.750)	5–4 (.556)	10–2 (.833)	2–0 (1.000)
Exempt	4	174	San Jose State	Mountain West	8th	7–13 (.350)	13–19 (.406)	15–19 (.441)	152	181	165	194	175	183	201	3–9 (.250)	4–2 (.667)	8–8 (.500)	0–7 (.000)	1–6 (.143)	5–4 (.556)	7–2 (.778)	2–0 (1.000)
		101		Average	4th	12–6 (.667)	21–11 (.656)	22–11 (.667)	104	110	102	93	99	100	101	7–6 (.538)	2–2 (.500)	13–3 (.813)	1–3 (.250)	2–3 (.400)	8–3 (.727)	10–1 (.909)	1–0 (1.000)
† As described previously, Utah Valley's inclusion via an automatic or exempt bid is undetermined.

== Bracket ==
All seeded teams hosted their first-round games, except for Dayton, because the First Four of the 2025 NCAA tournament was played on their home court. Dayton had another scheduling conflict with their arena and consequently played their second-round game on the road as well. All other second-round games were hosted by the higher seeded team. Seeded teams playing unseeded opponents hosted quarterfinal games. Hosts of other quarterfinal games are noted in the brackets below.

=== Dallas Region ===
First round March 18–19; Campus sites
1	SMU	73
Northern Iowa	63
4	Oklahoma State	89
Wichita State	79
2	North Texas	75
Furman	64
3	Arkansas State	103
Saint Louis	78

Second round March 23; Campus sites
1	SMU	83
4	Oklahoma State	85
2	North Texas	65
3	Arkansas State	63

Quarterfinal; March 25; Campus site
4	Oklahoma State	59
2	North Texas (Note: North Texas traveled to Stillwater, Oklahoma to play an away game due to a faculty/staff appreciation luncheon and the American Dance/Drill Team Nationals taking place at UNT Coliseum.)	61

=== Irvine Region ===
First round March 18–19; Campus sites
1	UC Irvine	82
Northern Colorado	72
4	Georgia Tech	64
Jacksonville State	81
2	Santa Clara	101
UC Riverside	62
3	Saint Joseph's	65
UAB	69

Second round March 23; Campus sites
1	UC Irvine	66
Jacksonville State	61
2	Santa Clara	84
UAB	88

Quarterfinal; March 26; Campus site
1	UC Irvine	81
UAB	77 ^{OT}

=== San Francisco Region ===
First round March 18–19; Campus sites
1	San Francisco	79
Utah Valley	70
4	San Jose State	70
Loyola Chicago	73
2	Stanford	87
Cal State Northridge	70
3	St. Bonaventure	56
Kent State	75

Second round March 23; Campus sites
1	San Francisco	76
Loyola Chicago	77
2	Stanford	75
Kent State	77

Quarterfinal; March 26; Campus site
Loyola Chicago (Note: Loyola Chicago was selected as the quarterfinal host.)	72
Kent State	62

=== Dayton Region ===
First round March 18–19; Campus sites
1	Dayton (Note: Dayton traveled to Boca Raton, Florida to play an away game due to the NCAA Division I Men's Basketball Tournament First Four taking place at UD Arena.)	86
Florida Atlantic	79
4	Middle Tennessee	103 ^{3OT}
Chattanooga	109
2	George Mason	86
Samford	69
3	Bradley	71
North Alabama	62

Second round March 22; Campus sites
1	Dayton (Note: Dayton traveled to Chattanooga, Tennessee to play an away game due to the OHSAA Boys Basketball State Championships taking place at UD Arena.)	72
Chattanooga	87
2	George Mason	67
3	Bradley	75

Quarterfinal; March 25; Campus site
Chattanooga	67
3	Bradley	65

=== Semifinals and final ===
Semifinals; April 1 Hinkle Fieldhouse
2	North Texas	67
1	UC Irvine	69
Loyola Chicago	73
Chattanooga	80

Final; April 3 Hinkle Fieldhouse
1	UC Irvine	84 ^{OT}
Chattanooga	85

== Game summaries ==
All times are in Eastern Daylight Time (UTC-4)

=== First round ===
ESPNU

March 18
7:00 p.m.

Box Score

Kent State 75, St. Bonaventure 56
Scoring by half: 29-28, 46-28
Pts: V. Davis - 14; Rebs: C. Hornbeak - 12; Asts: J. Sumlin - 4	Pts: C. Moore - 16; Rebs: L. Jones - 7 Asts: M. Council Jr. - 4
San Francisco Region

Reilly Center
St. Bonaventure, NY
Attendance: 3,024
Referees: A. Fiore, T. Kelly, M. Luckie

ESPN2

March 18
7:00 p.m.

Box Score

Jacksonville State 81, Georgia Tech 64
Scoring by half: 45-33, 36-31
Pts: J. Pierre Jr. - 30; Rebs: M. Nicholson - 9 Asts: J. Pierre Jr. - 7	Pts: 2 Tied - 7 Rebs: 2 Tied - 5 Asts: J. McCollum - 7
Irvine Region

McCamish Pavilion
Atlanta, GA
Attendance: 1,623
Referees: E. Lewis, C. Mooney, J. Pon

ESPN+

March 18
8:00 p.m.

Box Score

Chattanooga 109, Middle Tennessee 103 (3OT)
Scoring by half: 43-48, 41-36 Overtime: 4-4, 11-11, 10-4
Pts: B. Wieland - 31; Rebs: G. Keeslar - 11; Asts: T. Bonham - 6	Pts: C. Weston - 31; Rebs: E. Mostafa - 16; Asts: 2 Tied - 5
Dayton Region

Murphy Center
Murfreesboro, TN
Attendance: 3,505
Referees: B. Harris, J. Hicks, M. Swoboda

ESPNU

March 18
9:00 p.m.

Box Score

Saint Louis 78, Arkansas State 103
Scoring by half: 37-50, 41-53
Pts: R. Avila - 22; Rebs: A. McCottry - 10; Asts: A. McCottry - 3	Pts: I. Nelson - 26; Rebs: I. Nelson - 10; Asts: 2 Tied - 7
Dallas Region

First National Bank Arena
Jonesboro, AR
Attendance: 3,143
Referees: H. Allen, C. Ford, G. Shannon

ESPN2

March 18
9:00 p.m.

Box Score

Wichita State 79, Oklahoma State 89
Scoring by half: 35-40, 44-49
Pts: X. Bell - 24; Rebs: C. Washington - 11; Asts: 2 Tied - 2	Pts: B. Thompson - 23; Rebs: B. Newman - 12; Asts: K. Brantley - 4
Dallas Region

Gallagher-Iba Arena
Stillwater, OK
Attendance: 2,295
Referees: R. Anders, R. Felder, M. Rafferty

ESPNU

March 18
11:00 p.m.

Box Score

UC Riverside 62, Santa Clara 101
Scoring by half: 33-44, 29-57
Pts: N. Pickens - 15; Rebs: 4 Tied - 4 Asts: B. Hargress - 5	Pts: T. Bryan - 17; Rebs: 2 Tied - 7 Asts: E. Mahi - 5
Irvine Region

Leavey Center
Santa Clara, CA
Attendance: 672
Referees: D. Dean, M. Fulton, J. Garretson

ESPN2

March 18
11:00 p.m.

Box Score

Cal State Northridge 70, Stanford 87
Scoring by half: 29-46, 41-41
Pts: K. Jones - 18; Rebs: G. Lewis - 7 Asts: T. Beard - 4	Pts: M. Raynaud - 22; Rebs: M. Raynaud - 11; Asts: J. Blakes - 4
San Francisco Region

Maples Pavilion
Stanford, CA
Attendance: 1,119
Referees: L. Barney, M. Cichocki, P. Larson

ESPN2

March 19
7:00 p.m.

Box Score

Dayton 86, Florida Atlantic 79
Scoring by half: 44-38, 42-41
Pts: J. Bennett - 30; Rebs: M. Smith - 5 Asts: E. Cheeks - 4	Pts: K. Glenn - 18; Rebs: B. Miller - 7 Asts: L. Walker - 7
Dayton Region

Eleanor R. Baldwin Arena
Boca Raton, FL
Attendance: 1,846
Referees: L. Brandes, E. Lewis, J. Nieves

ESPN+

March 19
7:00 p.m.

Box Score

Samford 69, George Mason 86
Scoring by half: 24-45, 45-41
Pts: J. Brownell - 27; Rebs: T. Fort - 9 Asts: R. Jones - 8	Pts: K. Johnson - 20; Rebs: Z. Anderson - 10; Asts: K. Johnson - 5
Dayton Region

EagleBank Arena
Fairfax, VA
Attendance: 2,021
Referees: T. Crisp, R. Sassano, B. Stirt

ESPN+

March 19
7:00 p.m.

Box Score

UAB 69, Saint Joseph's 65
Scoring by half: 32-33, 37-32
Pts: Y. Lendeborg - 16; Rebs: Y. Lendeborg - 17; Asts: A. Vasquez - 4	Pts: X. Brown - 21; Rebs: J. Ajogbor - 10; Asts: 2 Tied - 4
Irvine Region

Michael J. Hagan Arena
Philadelphia, PA
Attendance: 1,004
Referees: R. Riley, W. Rutecki, J. Switzer

ESPN+

March 19
8:00 p.m.

Box Score

Furman 64, North Texas 75
Scoring by half: 34-32, 30-43
Pts: E. Bronson - 15; Rebs: D. Molnar - 5 Asts: P. Smith Jr. - 6	Pts: J. Floyd - 19; Rebs: 2 Tied - 6 Asts: J. Floyd - 7
Dallas Region

UNT Coliseum
Denton, TX
Attendance: 2,138
Referees: R. Clyburn, S. Land, S. Seales

ESPN+

March 19
8:00 p.m.

Box Score

North Alabama 62, Bradley 71
Scoring by half: 21-39, 41-32
Pts: D. Bacchus - 19; Rebs: C. Williams - 12; Asts: 2 Tied - 2	Pts: D. Hannah - 17; Rebs: C. Dillon - 8 Asts: C. Davis - 4
Dayton Region

Carver Arena
Peoria, IL
Attendance: 2,950
Referees: J. Albrecht, J. Duke, G. Jeffers

ESPN2

March 19
9:00 p.m.

Box Score

Northern Iowa 63, SMU 73
Scoring by half: 32-33, 31-40
Pts: T. Campbell - 16; Rebs: B. Schwieger - 9 Asts: 2 Tied - 4	Pts: B. Edwards - 16; Rebs: B. Edwards - 10; Asts: B. Edwards - 7
Dallas Region

Moody Coliseum
University Park, TX
Attendance: 2,418
Referees: R. Anders, J. Heater, C. Shaw

ESPN+

March 19
10:00 p.m.

Box Score

Northern Colorado 72, UC Irvine 82
Scoring by half: 41-37, 31-45
Pts: B. Wisne - 16; Rebs: I. Hawthorne - 12; Asts: L. Reynolds - 5	Pts: D. Tillis - 24; Rebs: B. Leuchten - 10; Asts: J. Hohn - 5
Irvine Region

Bren Events Center
Irvine, CA
Attendance: 1,241
Referees: R. Holmes, M. Rukasin, K. Smith

ESPNU

March 19
11:00 p.m.

Box Score

Utah Valley 70, San Francisco 79
Scoring by half: 32-37, 38-42
Pts: C. Welling - 20; Rebs: C. Welling - 11; Asts: T. Leonhardt - 6	Pts: M. Thomas - 21; Rebs: M. Thomas - 10; Asts: R. Beasley - 6
San Francisco Region

The Sobrato Center
San Francisco, CA
Attendance: 1,309
Referees: R. Ames, S. Lehigh, D. White

ESPN2

March 19
11:00 p.m.

Box Score

Loyola Chicago 73, San Jose State 70
Scoring by half: 42-35, 31-25
Pts: D. Watson - 24; Rebs: F. Nwaokorie - 9 Asts: 3 Tied - 3	Pts: J. Uduje - 18; Rebs: R. Vaihola - 9 Asts: R. Vaihola - 3
San Francisco Region

Provident Credit Union Event Center
San Jose, CA
Attendance: 3,627
Referees: C. Hogan, D. Nguyen, J. Phillips

=== Second round ===
ESPN2

March 22
11:30 a.m.

Box Score

Chattanooga 87, Dayton 72
Scoring by half: 42-34, 45-38
Pts: H. Huff - 26; Rebs: T. Bonham - 8 Asts: 2 Tied - 4	Pts: N. Santos - 18; Rebs: N. Santos - 6 Asts: M. Smith - 7
Dayton Region

McKenzie Arena
Chattanooga, TN
Attendance: 2,633
Referees: S. Land, C. McCoy, M. Wallace

ESPN+

March 22
2:00 p.m.

Box Score

Bradley 75, George Mason 67
Scoring by half: 37-28, 38-39
Pts: 2 Tied - 21; Rebs: C. Thomas - 11; Asts: D. Deen - 6	Pts: K. Johnson - 16; Rebs: 2 Tied - 5 Asts: B. O'Connor - 6
Dayton Region

EagleBank Arena
Fairfax, VA
Attendance: 2,180
Referees: J. Heater, C. Shaw, J. Switzer

ESPN2

March 23
3:00 p.m.

Box Score

Oklahoma State 85, SMU 83
Scoring by half: 40-41, 45-42
Pts: B. Thompson - 24; Rebs: A. Dean - 6 Asts: 2 Tied - 6	Pts: K. Oquendo - 31; Rebs: S. Yigitoglu - 9 Asts: C. Harris - 10
Dallas Region

Moody Coliseum
University Park, TX
Attendance: 3,106
Referees: A. Flore, J. Pon, R. Sassano

ESPN2

March 23
7:00 p.m.

Box Score

Loyola Chicago 77, San Francisco 76
Scoring by half: 36-32, 41-44
Pts: J. Dawson - 35; Rebs: S. Edwards Jr. - 8 Asts: J. Quinn - 4	Pts: M. Thomas - 36; Rebs: C. Linguard Jr. - 8 Asts: M. Thomas - 5
San Francisco Region

The Sobrato Center
San Francisco, CA
Attendance: 1,624
Referees: G. Grimshaw, R. Holmes, K. Smith

ESPNU

March 23
7:00 p.m.

Box Score

Arkansas State 63, North Texas 65
Scoring by half: 33-34, 30-31
Pts: I. Nelson - 16; Rebs: I. Nelson - 14; Asts: T. Todd - 5	Pts: 2 Tied - 16; Rebs: B. Lorient - 8 Asts: J. Floyd - 4
Dallas Region

UNT Coliseum
Denton, TX
Attendance: 2,661
Referees: R. Christian, J. Deering, S. Orkus Jr.

ESPN+

March 23
9:00 p.m.

Box Score

Jacksonville State 61, UC Irvine 66
Scoring by half: 35-36, 26-30
Pts: J. Pierre Jr. - 15; Rebs: J. Pierre Jr. - 11; Asts: J. Pierre Jr. - 4	Pts: J. Hohn - 22; Rebs: D. Tillis - 9 Asts: 2 Tied - 3
Irvine Region

Bren Events Center
Irvine, CA
Attendance: 1,304
Referees: J. Garretson, R. Lehigh, M. Rukasin

ESPNU

March 23
9:00 p.m.

Box Score

UAB 88, Santa Clara 84
Scoring by half: 37-44, 51-40
Pts: Y. Lendeborg - 22; Rebs: Y. Lendeborg - 11; Asts: 2 Tied - 7	Pts: C. Stewart - 10; Rebs: C. Tilly - 12; Asts: E. Makhi - 7
Irvine Region

Leavey Center
Santa Clara, CA
Attendance: 742
Referees: R. Ames, B. Cartmell, M. Mojica

ESPN2

March 23
9:00 p.m.

Box Score

Kent State 77, Stanford 75
Scoring by half: 43-34, 34-41
Pts: J. Sullinger - 34; Rebs: D. Gillespie - 14; Asts: J. Sullinger - 5	Pts: J. Blakes - 23; Rebs: M. Raynaud - 10; Asts: J. Blakes - 5
San Francisco Region

Maples Pavilion
Stanford, CA
Attendance: 1,542
Referees: D. Dean, M. Fulton, D. White

=== Quarterfinals ===
ESPN2

March 25
7:00 p.m.

Box Score

Chattanooga 67, Bradley 65
Scoring by half: 25-38, 42-27
Pts: H. Huff - 21; Rebs: L. Diouf - 7 Asts: 4 Tied - 3	Pts: D. Burch - 14; Rebs: 2 Tied - 6 Asts: D. Deen - 4
Dayton Region

Carver Arena
Peoria, IL
Attendance: 4,954
Referees: J. Baker, T. Kumpf, E. Wilson

ESPN

March 25
9:00 p.m.

Box Score

Oklahoma State 59, North Texas 61
Scoring by half: 22-27, 37-34
Pts: 2 Tied - 17; Rebs: A. Dean - 7 Asts: B. Thompson - 3	Pts: A. Wright - 15; Rebs: M. Sissoko - 9 Asts: J. Floyd - 5
Dallas Region

Gallagher-Iba Arena
Stillwater, OK
Attendance: 4,089
Referees: T. Johnson, C. Pasci, L. Santos

ESPN2

March 26
7:00 p.m.

Box Score

Kent State 62, Loyola Chicago 72
Scoring by half: 33-37, 29-35
Pts: J. Sullinger - 12; Rebs: D. Gillespie - 12; Asts: C. Medley - 4	Pts: M. Rubin - 18; Rebs: M. Rubin - 9 Asts: S. Edwards Jr. - 5
San Francisco Region

Joseph J. Gentile Arena
Chicago, IL
Attendance: 3,554
Referees: A. Bonner, M. Millione, C. Mooney

ESPN2

March 26
9:00 p.m.

Box Score

UAB 77, UC Irvine 81 (OT)
Scoring by half: 36-31, 33-38 Overtime: 8-12
Pts: C. Coleman - 21; Rebs: Y. Lendeborg - 17; Asts: Y. Lendeborg - 4	Pts: D. Tillis - 22; Rebs: D. Tillis - 11; Asts: 2 Tied - 5
Irvine Region

Bren Events Center
Irvine, CA
Attendance: 1,378
Referees: J. Ford, G. Nelson, J. Shamion

=== Semifinals ===
ESPN

April 1
7:00 p.m.

Box Score

North Texas 67, UC Irvine 69
Scoring by half: 30-30, 37-39
Pts: A. Wright - 25; Rebs: M. Sissoko - 13; Asts: J. Floyd - 3	Pts: D. Tillis - 16; Rebs: D. Tillis - 11; Asts: J. Hohn - 8
Dallas Region vs. Irvine Region

Hinkle Fieldhouse
Indianapolis, IN
Attendance: 3,288
Referees: D. Carr, B. Smith, V. Voyard-Tadal

ESPN2

April 1
9:30 p.m.

Box Score

Chattanooga 80, Loyola Chicago 73
Scoring by half: 34-38, 46-35
Pts: T. Bonham - 23; Rebs: G. Keeslar - 7 Asts: G. Keeslar - 5	Pts: J. Dawson - 19; Rebs: 2 Tied - 6 Asts: J. Dawson - 6
Dayton Region vs. San Francisco Region

Hinkle Fieldhouse
Indianapolis, IN
Attendance: 3,288
Referees: C. Armstrong, O. Shortt, E. Young

=== Final ===
ESPN

April 3
9:00 p.m.

Box Score

Chattanooga 85, UC Irvine 84 (OT)
Scoring by half: 38-37, 38-39 Overtime: 9-8
Pts: 2 Tied - 19; Rebs: 2 Tied - 10; Asts: G. Keeslar - 5	Pts: D. Tillis - 19; Rebs: B. Leuchten - 11; Asts: J. Hohn - 4
Championship

Hinkle Fieldhouse
Indianapolis, IN
Attendance: 2,825
Referees: M. Greenstein, B. Jarrett, M. Potter

== Quality of participating teams compared with College Basketball Crown ==
Fox Sports leveraged its media rights relationships with the Big East, Big Ten, and Big 12 conferences to create the CBC and thereby create postseason college basketball content for itself. Each of those three conferences committed to send at least two teams to the CBC. In addition, non-NCAA tournament teams from those three conferences were contractually prohibited from playing in any other postseason tournament, including the 2025 National Invitation Tournament (NIT), if they declined an invitation or removed themselves from consideration for a bid to the CBC. Even if Big East, Big Ten, or Big 12 schools might have preferred to play NIT games at home instead of CBC games in Las Vegas or anticipated they might have more attractive matchups in the NIT, they did not have that option, which may have degraded the quality of the NIT field. No Big East or Big Ten teams appeared in the 2025 NIT, and Oklahoma State was the only Big 12 team to accept an NIT bid. Atlantic Coast Conference teams Georgia Tech, SMU, and Stanford were the only other power conference teams to accept bids to the NIT. In contrast, eleven of the sixteen CBC participants were from power conferences.

An analysis of the NET rankings as of Selection Sunday for the teams participating in the 2025 CBC and NIT is set forth in the table below.

CBC participants		NIT participants			
Team	NET	Team	NET	Team	NET
Boise State	44	SMU	46	Middle Tennessee	105
Cincinnati	50	Santa Clara	57	UAB	106
Villanova	55	UC Irvine	62	Loyola Chicago	107
Nebraska	59	San Francisco	64	Utah Valley	108
USC	70	North Texas	65	Georgia Tech	109
UCF	71	Dayton	67	Florida Atlantic	111
Utah	73	George Mason	68	North Alabama	113
Arizona State	74	Saint Joseph's	76	Northern Colorado	114
Butler	83	Bradley	80	Chattanooga	115
Oregon State	85	Stanford	81	Samford	116
Colorado	86	Northern Iowa	93	Jacksonville State	122
Georgetown	88	Arkansas State	94	Furman	127
Washington State	112	Oklahoma State	95	Kent State	128
DePaul	119	St. Bonaventure	97	Wichita State	134
George Washington	124	Saint Louis	101	UC Riverside	142
Tulane	145	Cal State Northridge	104	San Jose State	175
Mean: 84; Median: 79; Best: 44; Worst: 145		Top 16 teams Mean: 78; Median: 78; Best: 46; Worst: 104		All 32 teams Mean: 99; Median: 105; Best: 46; Worst: 175	

Like all metrics used to rank or rate college basketball teams, the NET is imperfect; however, it is consistently applied and represents one way in which teams can be compared. Since the NIT had to fill thirty-two tournament berths, whereas the CBC had only sixteen, data are shown for both the full NIT field as well as the top sixteen teams based on NET rankings. Of course, there are other metrics that could be used to compare the fields of the two tournaments, including the number of power conference teams participating.

== Media ==
ESPN, Inc. has exclusive rights to all of the NIT games. It telecasts every game across ESPN, ESPN2, ESPNU, ESPN3, and ESPN+. Westwood One has exclusive radio rights to the semifinals and the championship.

== See also ==
- 2025 NCAA Division I men's basketball tournament
- 2025 College Basketball Crown
- 2025 College Basketball Invitational
