= 2024–25 Brown Bears men's basketball team =

American college basketball season

2024–25 Brown Bears men's basketball
- Conference: Ivy League
- Record: 14–13 (6–8 Ivy)
- Head coach: Mike Martin (12th season)
- Associate head coach: Matt Lottich
- Assistant coaches: Tyson Wheeler; Sam Hershberger
- Home arena: Pizzitola Sports Center

2024–25 Ivy League men's basketball standings
	Conf.				Overall
Team	W		L	PCT	W		L	PCT
Yale †	13	–	1	.929	22	–	8	.733
Cornell	9	–	5	.643	18	–	11	.621
Dartmouth	8	–	6	.571	14	–	14	.500
Princeton	8	–	6	.571	19	–	11	.633
Harvard	7	–	7	.500	12	–	15	.444
Brown	6	–	8	.429	14	–	13	.519
Penn	4	–	10	.286	8	–	19	.296
Columbia	1	–	13	.071	12	–	15	.444
† 2025 Ivy League tournament winner

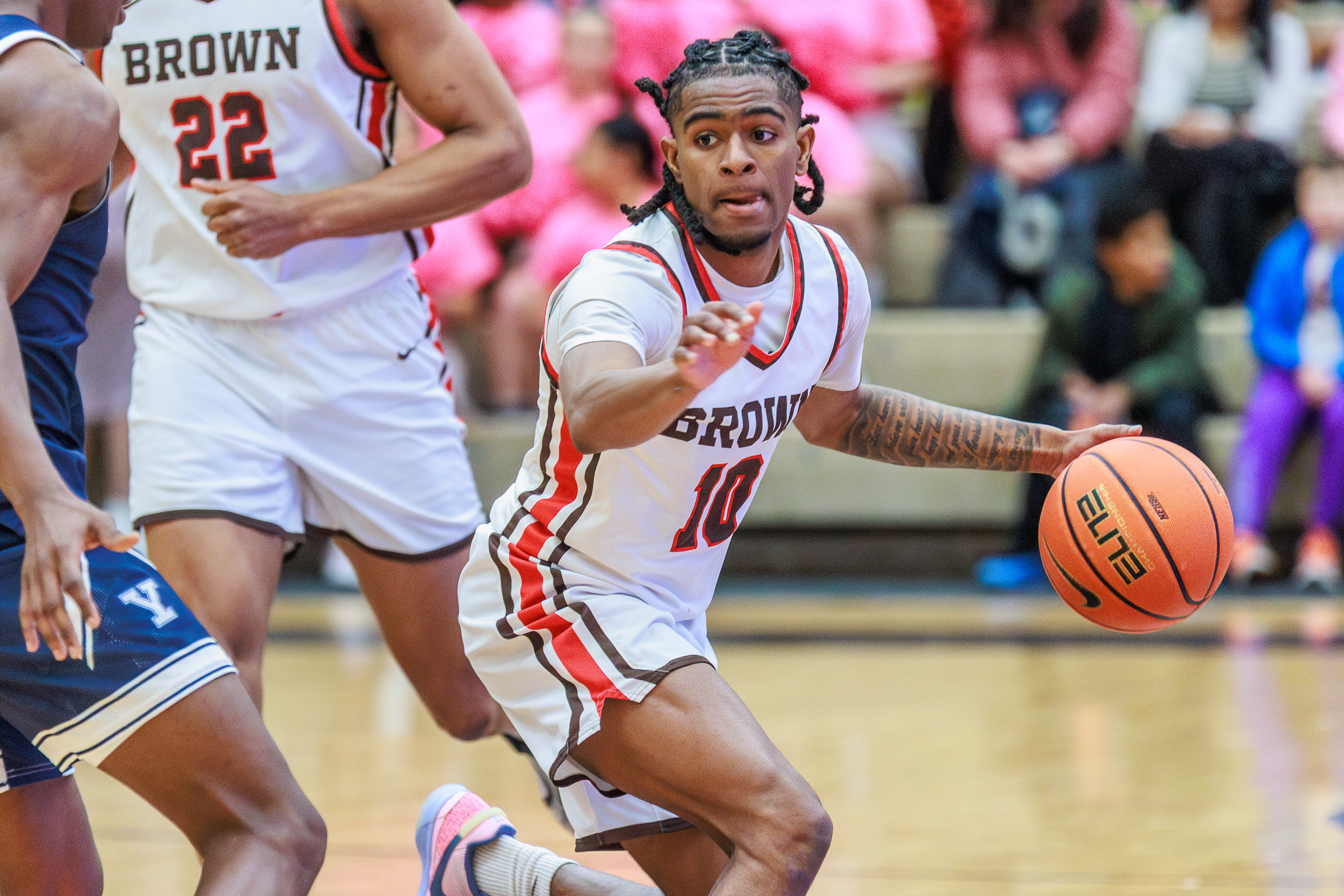
Senior Kino Lilly Jr. scored 19 points in his final game with the Brown Bears

The 2024–25 Brown Bears men's basketball team represented Brown University during the 2024–25 NCAA Division I men's basketball season. The Bears, led by 12th-year head coach Mike Martin, played their home games at the Pizzitola Sports Center located in Providence, Rhode Island, as members of the Ivy League.

== Previous season ==
The Bears finished the 2023–24 season of 13–18, 8–6 in Ivy League play, finishing in fourth place. They qualified for the Ivy League tournament, defeating top-seeded Princeton in the semifinals, before losing to Yale in the championship game.

== Roster ==
2024–25 Brown Bears men's basketball team
Players
Coaches

Pos.	#	Name	Height	Weight	Year	Hometown
G	2	Jeremiah Jenkins	6 ft 0 in (1.83 m)	155 lb (70 kg)	Fr	New Britain, CT
G	3	Alexander Lesburt Jr.	6 ft 5 in (1.96 m)	197 lb (89 kg)	Jr	Derry, NH
G	4	Lyndel Erold	6 ft 3 in (1.91 m)	170 lb (77 kg)	Sr	Boston, MA
F	6	Wyatt DeGraaf	6 ft 10 in (2.08 m)	225 lb (102 kg)	Fr	Durham, NC
G	10	Kino Lilly Jr.	6 ft 0 in (1.83 m)	165 lb (75 kg)	Sr	Glenn Dale, MD
G	11	Jerrell Barron Jr.	6 ft 4 in (1.93 m)	175 lb (79 kg)	Fr	Atascocita, TX
G	13	Malcolm Wrisby-Jefferson	6 ft 4 in (1.93 m)	195 lb (88 kg)	So	Queens, NY
G	14	Luke Paragon	6 ft 4 in (1.93 m)	195 lb (88 kg)	So	Cicero, NY
G/F	21	Aaron Cooley	6 ft 5 in (1.96 m)	185 lb (84 kg)	Sr	Roxbury, MA
F	22	Landon Lewis	6 ft 7 in (2.01 m)	215 lb (98 kg)	Jr	Los Angeles, CA
G/F	23	David Rochester	6 ft 8 in (2.03 m)	205 lb (93 kg)	Jr	Chatham, NJ
F	24	Drew Kania	6 ft 8 in (2.03 m)	215 lb (98 kg)	Fr	Great Falls, VA
G	25	Adrian Uchidiuno	6 ft 2 in (1.88 m)	160 lb (73 kg)	So	Markham, ON
F	31	Nana Owusu-Anane	6 ft 8 in (2.03 m)	220 lb (100 kg)	Sr	Burlington, ON
F	45	N'famara Dabo	6 ft 8 in (2.03 m)	225 lb (102 kg)	So	Conakry, Guinea

Head coach

- Mike Martin (Brown)

Assistant coach(es)

- Matt Lottich (Stanford)
- Tyson Wheeler (Fairfield)
- Sam Hershberger (Elon)

Legend

- (C) Team captain
- (S) Suspended
- (I) Ineligible
- (W) Walk-on
- Injured
- Current redshirt

Roster
Last update: November 6, 2024

== Schedule and results ==
Date time, TV	Rank^{#}	Opponent^{#}	Result	Record	High points	High rebounds	High assists	Site (attendance) city, state
Non-conference regular season
November 4, 2024*; 7:00 pm, ESPN+		at Siena	L 71–72 ^{OT}	0–1	18 – Lilly Jr.	15 – Cooley	3 – Wrisby-Jefferson	MVP Arena (4,483); Albany, NY
November 10, 2024*; 2:00 pm, ESPN+		Maine	L 67–69	0–2	18 – Lilly Jr.	5 – Tied	5 – Lilly Jr.	Pizzitola Sports Center (751); Providence, RI
November 15, 2024*; 7:00 pm, ESPN+		New Hampshire; College Hill Classic	W 76–58	1–2	26 – Lilly Jr.	12 – Cooley	4 – Lilly Jr.	Pizzitola Sports Center (631); Providence, RI
November 16, 2024*; 7:00 pm, ESPN+		Holy Cross; College Hill Classic	L 65–73	1–3	24 – Lilly Jr.	11 – Cooley	4 – Lesburt Jr.	Pizzitola Sports Center (802); Providence, RI
November 17, 2024*; 6:00 pm, ESPN+		Sacred Heart; College Hill Classic	W 89–70	2–3	22 – Lesburt Jr.	11 – Lewis	6 – Lilly Jr.	Pizzitola Sports Center (518); Providence, RI
November 23, 2024*; 1:00 pm, ESPN+		at Canisius	W 83–76	3–3	21 – Lilly Jr.	10 – Cooley	3 – Tied	Koessler Athletic Center (953); Buffalo, NY
November 27, 2024*; 2:00 pm, ESPN+		Stony Brook	W 77–54	4–3	17 – Cooley	8 – Lewis	5 – Wrisby-Jefferson	Pizzitola Sports Center; Providence, RI
December 3, 2024*; 7:00 pm, ESPN+		at Vermont	W 60–53	5–3	23 – Lilly Jr.	10 – Lewis	3 – Lilly Jr.	Patrick Gym (2,111); Burlington, VT
December 6, 2024*; 6:00 pm, ESPN+		at Bryant	W 76–75	6–3	23 – Lilly Jr.	7 – Tied	4 – Jenkins	Chace Athletic Center (1,234); Smithfield, RI
December 10, 2024*; 7:00 pm, ESPN+		Rhode Island	W 84–80 ^{2OT}	7–3	23 – Lilly Jr.	7 – Tied	10 – Lilly Jr.	Pizzitola Sports Center (2,253); Providence, RI
December 22, 2024*; 3:00 pm, ESPN		at No. 8 Kansas	L 53–87	7–4	18 – Lilly Jr.	9 – Cooley	3 – Cooley	Allen Fieldhouse (15,300); Lawrence, KS
December 31, 2024*; 2:00 pm, ESPNU		at No. 10 Kentucky	L 54–88	7–5	16 – Lilly Jr.	6 – Lewis	4 – Lilly Jr.	Rupp Arena (20,042); Lexington, KY
January 5, 2025*; 2:00 pm, ESPN+		Johnson & Wales	W 98–57	8–5	16 – Lilly Jr.	10 – Dabo	8 – Lilly Jr.	Pizzitola Sports Center (552); Providence, RI
Ivy League regular season
January 11, 2025; 12:00 pm, ESPNU/ESPN+		at Yale	L 58–79	8–6 (0–1)	15 – Erold	8 – Lewis	5 – Lilly Jr.	John J. Lee Amphitheater (1,402); New Haven, CT
January 18, 2025; 2:00 pm, ESPN+		Harvard	L 67–80	8–7 (0–2)	22 – Lilly Jr.	8 – Lewis	4 – Lilly Jr.	Pizzitola Sports Center (809); Providence, RI
January 20, 2025; 2:00 pm, ESPN+		at Cornell	W 83–82	9–7 (1–2)	28 – Cooley	7 – Cooley	3 – Tied	Newman Arena; Ithaca, NY
January 25, 2025; 2:00 pm, ESPN+		Dartmouth	L 83–84	9–8 (1–3)	21 – Lesburt Jr.	5 – Tied	10 – Lilly Jr.	Pizzitola Sports Center; Providence, RI
January 31, 2025; 7:00 pm, ESPN+		at Penn	W 88–79	10–8 (2–3)	34 – Lilly Jr.	11 – Erold	3 – Tied	The Palestra (1,750); Philadelphia, PA
February 1, 2025; 5:00 pm, ESPN+		at Princeton	L 49–69	10–9 (2–4)	18 – Lilly Jr.	8 – Cooley	3 – Wrisby-Jefferson	Jadwin Gymnasium (4,506); Princeton, NJ
February 8, 2025; 2:00 pm, ESPN+		at Columbia	L 72–74	10–10 (2–5)	16 – Wrisby-Jefferson	9 – Cooley	5 – Lilly Jr.	Levien Gymnasium (1,347); New York, NY
February 14, 2025; 7:00 pm, ESPN+		Princeton	W 70–56	11–10 (3–5)	17 – Lilly Jr.	7 – Tied	3 – Tied	Pizzitola Sports Center (1,356); Providence, RI
February 15, 2025; 6:00 pm, ESPN+		Penn	W 82–72	12–10 (4–5)	23 – Lilly Jr.	7 – Lewis	5 – Lilly Jr.	Pizzitola Sports Center (953); Providence, RI
February 21, 2025; 7:00 pm, ESPN+		Columbia	W 86–61	13–10 (5–5)	20 – Lesburt Jr.	8 – Lewis	8 – Lilly Jr.	Pizzitola Sports Center (1,118); Providence, RI
February 22, 2025; 6:00 pm, ESPN+		Cornell	L 81–85	13–11 (5–6)	20 – Lewis	6 – Lewis	11 – Lilly Jr.	Pizzitola Sports Center (1,328); Providence, RI
February 28, 2025; 5:00 pm, ESPN+		at Harvard	W 59–52	14–11 (6–6)	14 – Cooley	6 – Tied	1 – Tied	Lavietes Pavilion (1,273); Cambridge, MA
March 1, 2025; 4:00 pm, ESPN+		at Dartmouth	L 58–78	14–12 (6–7)	22 – Lewis	8 – Lesburt Jr.	4 – Tied	Leede Arena; Hanover, NH
March 8, 2025; 2:00 pm, ESPN+		Yale	L 61–70	14–13 (6–8)	19 – Lilly Jr.	9 – Tied	5 – Lilly Jr.	Pizzitola Sports Center (1,589); Providence, RI
*Non-conference game. ^{#}Rankings from AP Poll. (#) Tournament seedings in parentheses. All times are in Eastern.
