= 2025 Ivy League men's basketball tournament =

American college basketball tournament

- Classification: Division I
- Season: 2024–25
- Teams: 4
- Site: Pizzitola Sports Center; Providence, Rhode Island
- Champions: Yale (4th title)
- Winning coach: James Jones (4th title)
- MVP: John Poulakidas (Yale)
- Attendance: 5,107 (1,702 per match)
- Television: ESPN networks

2024–25 Ivy League men's basketball standings
	Conf.				Overall
Team	W		L	PCT	W		L	PCT
Yale †	13	–	1	.929	22	–	8	.733
Cornell	9	–	5	.643	18	–	11	.621
Dartmouth	8	–	6	.571	14	–	14	.500
Princeton	8	–	6	.571	19	–	11	.633
Harvard	7	–	7	.500	12	–	15	.444
Brown	6	–	8	.429	14	–	13	.519
Penn	4	–	10	.286	8	–	19	.296
Columbia	1	–	13	.071	12	–	15	.444
† 2025 Ivy League tournament winner

The 2025 Ivy League men's basketball tournament, popularly referred to as "Ivy Madness", was a single-elimination postseason tournament that determined the champion of the Ivy League for the 2024–25 NCAA Division I men's basketball season. It was the eighth edition of the tournament, and it was held March 15–16, 2025, at the Pizzitola Sports Center on the campus of Brown University in Providence, Rhode Island. The top four finishers in the Ivy League regular season standings qualify for the tournament, which consists of three games. The tournament champions, Yale, received the Ivy League's automatic bid to the 2025 NCAA Tournament.

== Seeds ==
The top four teams in the Ivy League regular-season standings will qualify for the tournament and will be seeded according to their records in conference play, resulting in a Shaughnessy playoff. If a tie for any of the top four positions exists, tiebreakers are applied in the following order:

- Head-to-head record between teams involved in the tie.
- Record against the top team(s) not involved in the tie in order of conference record, going down through the seedings until the tie is broken.
- Average of the teams' ranking in the following computer systems: NCAA NET, Sagarin, KenPom, and ESPN Basketball Percentage Index.

Seed	School	Record	Tiebreaker
1	Yale	13–1	
2	Cornell	9–5	
3	Dartmouth	8–6	1–1 vs. Cornell
4	Princeton	8–6	0–2 vs. Cornell
DNQ	Harvard	7–7	
DNQ	Brown	6–8	
DNQ	Penn	4–10	
DNQ	Columbia	1–13	

== Schedule ==
Session	Game	Time	Matchup	Score	Television	Attendance
Semifinals – Saturday, March 15
1	1	11:00 am	No. 1 Yale vs. No. 4 Princeton	59–57	ESPNU	1,684
1	2	2:00 pm	No. 2 Cornell vs. No. 3 Dartmouth	87–71	ESPNews	1,684
Championship – Sunday, March 16
2	3	12:00 pm	No. 1 Yale vs. No. 2 Cornell	90–84	ESPN2	1,739
Game times in EDT. Rankings denote tournament seeding.

== Bracket ==
Semifinals; Saturday, March 15; ESPNU; ESPNews
1	Yale	59
4	Princeton	57
2	Cornell	87
3	Dartmouth	71

Championship; Sunday, March 16; ESPN2
1	Yale	90
2	Cornell	84

== See also ==
- 2025 Ivy League women's basketball tournament
