= 2024–25 Yale Bulldogs men's basketball team =

American college basketball season

2024–25 Yale Bulldogs men's basketball

Ivy League regular season & tournament champions

NCAA tournament, First Round
- Conference: Ivy League
- Record: 22–8 (13–1 Ivy)
- Head coach: James Jones (25th season)
- Associate head coach: Matt Kingsley; Justin Simon
- Assistant coach: Brandon Sherrod
- Home arena: John J. Lee Amphitheater

2024–25 Ivy League men's basketball standings
	Conf.				Overall
Team	W		L	PCT	W		L	PCT
Yale †	13	–	1	.929	22	–	8	.733
Cornell	9	–	5	.643	18	–	11	.621
Dartmouth	8	–	6	.571	14	–	14	.500
Princeton	8	–	6	.571	19	–	11	.633
Harvard	7	–	7	.500	12	–	15	.444
Brown	6	–	8	.429	14	–	13	.519
Penn	4	–	10	.286	8	–	19	.296
Columbia	1	–	13	.071	12	–	15	.444
† 2025 Ivy League tournament winner

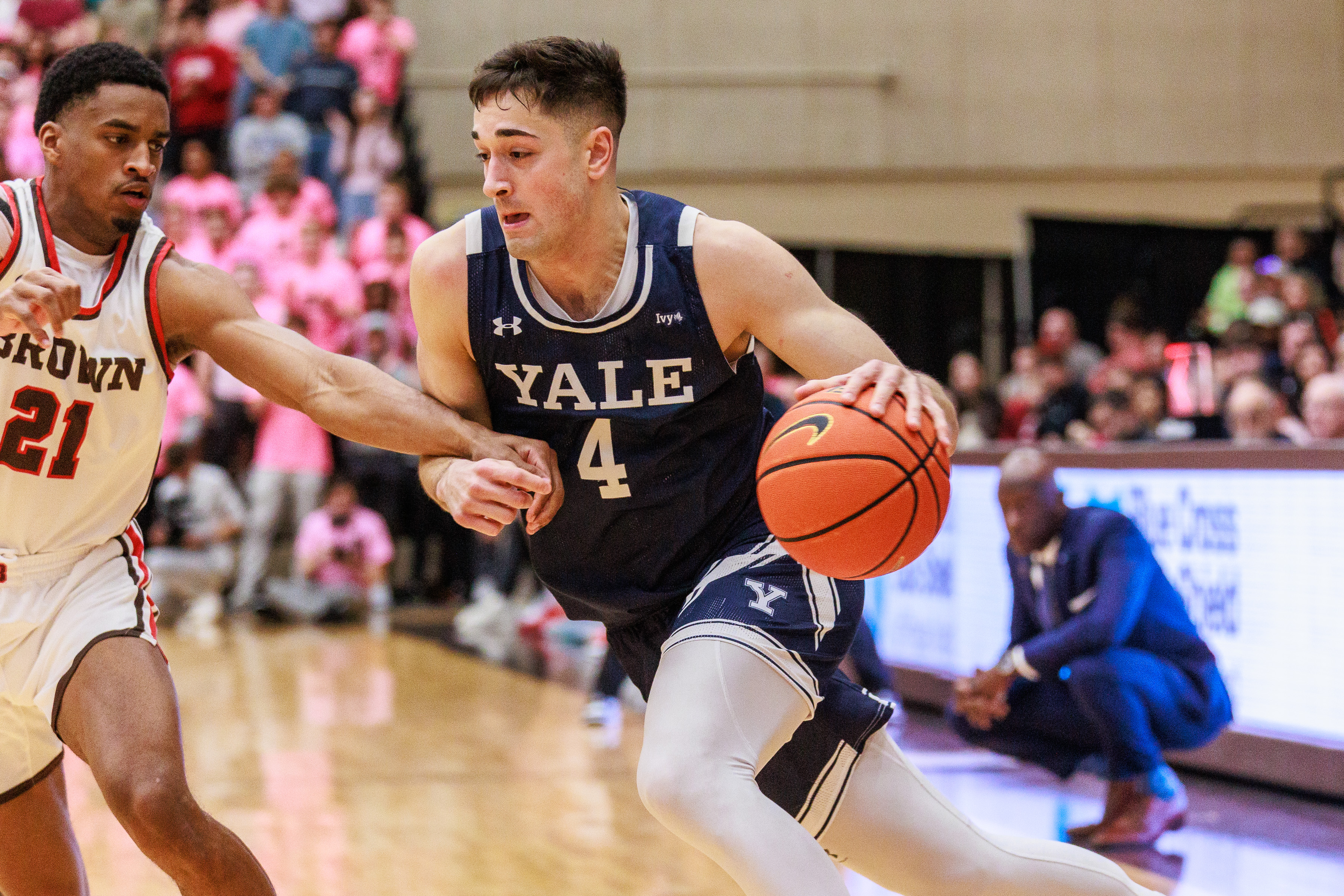
John Poulakidas scored 27 points against Brown

The 2024–25 Yale Bulldogs men's basketball team represented Yale University during the 2024–25 NCAA Division I men's basketball season. The Bulldogs, led by 25th-year head coach James Jones, played their home games at John J. Lee Amphitheater in New Haven, Connecticut as members of the Ivy League.

== Previous season ==
The Bulldogs finished the 2023–24 season 23–10, 11–3 in Ivy League play to finish in second place. In the Ivy League Tournament, they defeated Cornell and Brown to earn the conference's automatic bid into the 2024 NCAA Tournament. As the No. 13 seed in the East region, the Bulldogs went on to upset the No. 4 seed Auburn, before their season came to an end with a loss to San Diego State in the second round.

== Roster ==
2024–25 Yale Bulldogs men's basketball team
Players
Coaches

Pos.	#	Name	Height	Weight	Year	Hometown
G	2	Bez Mbeng	6 ft 4 in (1.93 m)	185 lb (84 kg)	Sr	Potomac, Maryland
G	3	Jordan Brathwaite	6 ft 4 in (1.93 m)	190 lb (86 kg)	Fr	Fulton, Maryland
G	4	John Poulakidas	6 ft 6 in (1.98 m)	205 lb (93 kg)	Sr	Naperville, Illinois
F	8	Isaac Celiscar	6 ft 6 in (1.98 m)	210 lb (95 kg)	Fr	Winter Haven, Florida
F	9	Riley Fox	6 ft 6 in (1.98 m)	195 lb (88 kg)	Fr	West Hartford, Connecticut
C	10	Samson Aletan	6 ft 10 in (2.08 m)	223 lb (101 kg)	So	Dallas, Texas
G	11	Trevor Mullin	6 ft 0 in (1.83 m)	175 lb (79 kg)	So	Wellesley, Massachusetts
G	12	Teo Rice	6 ft 2 in (1.88 m)	190 lb (86 kg)	Sr	Bethesda, Maryland
G	13	Emir Buyukhanli	6 ft 5 in (1.96 m)	200 lb (91 kg)	Sr	Ankara, Turkey
F	14	Casey Simmons	6 ft 6 in (1.98 m)	180 lb (82 kg)	Jr	Milton, Massachusetts
G	22	Jeannot Basima	6 ft 4 in (1.93 m)	190 lb (86 kg)	So	Goma, Democratic Republic of the Congo
G	24	Yassine Gharram	6 ft 3 in (1.91 m)	195 lb (88 kg)	Sr	San Diego, California
F	33	Jack Molloy	6 ft 7 in (2.01 m)	245 lb (111 kg)	Sr	Greenwich, Connecticut
F	42	Nick Townsend	6 ft 7 in (2.01 m)	250 lb (113 kg)	Jr	Chappaqua, New York
G	44	Devon Arlington	6 ft 3 in (1.91 m)	190 lb (86 kg)	Jr	San Marcos, California

Head coach

- James Jones (Albany)

Assistant coach(es)

- Matt Kingsley (Wesleyan)
- Justin Simon (Yale)
- Brandon Sherrod (Yale)

Legend

- (C) Team captain
- (S) Suspended
- (I) Ineligible
- (W) Walk-on
- Injured
- Current redshirt

Roster
Last update: November 3, 2024

== Schedule and results ==
Date time, TV	Rank^{#}	Opponent^{#}	Result	Record	Site (attendance) city, state
Non-conference regular season
November 4, 2024*; 8:00 p.m., ESPN+		Quinnipiac	W 88–62	1–0	John J. Lee Amphitheater (1,104); New Haven, CT
November 8, 2024*; 8:00 p.m., ESPN+		at UIC	L 79–91	1–1	Credit Union 1 Arena (3,102); Chicago, IL
November 11, 2024*; 8:00 p.m., BTN		at No. 13 Purdue	L 84–92	1–2	Mackey Arena (14,876); West Lafayette, IN
November 13, 2024*; 7:00 p.m., ESPN+		Emerson	W 100–46	2–2	John J. Lee Amphitheater (812); New Haven, CT
November 16, 2024*; 4:00 p.m., BTN		at Minnesota	L 56–59	2–3	Williams Arena (8,205); Minneapolis, MN
November 20, 2024*; 6:30 p.m., FloHoops		at Stony Brook	W 86–64	3–3	Island Federal Arena (1,851); Stony Brook, NY
November 23, 2024*; 2:30 p.m., ESPN+		vs. Fairfield; Hall of Fame Tip-Off	W 91–66	4–3	Mohegan Sun Arena (2,100); Uncasville, CT
November 24, 2024*; 5:30 p.m., ESPNU		vs. Delaware; Hall of Fame Tip-Off	L 94–100	4–4	Mohegan Sun Arena (3,124); Uncasville, CT
December 2, 2024*; 7:00 p.m., ESPN+		at Rhode Island	L 78–84	4–5	Ryan Center (3,547); Kingston, RI
December 7, 2024*; 2:00 p.m., ESPN+		Vermont	W 65–60	5–5	John J. Lee Amphitheater (1,242); New Haven, CT
December 20, 2024*; 7:00 p.m., YouTube		vs. Akron; Sun Bowl Invitational semifinals	W 74–58	6–5	Don Haskins Center; El Paso, TX
December 21, 2024*; 9:00 p.m., YouTube		at UTEP; Sun Bowl Invitational championship	L 74–75	6–6	Don Haskins Center (5,316); El Paso, TX
January 1, 2025*; 1:00 p.m., ESPN+		Howard	W 93–65	7–6	John J. Lee Amphitheater (1,479); New Haven, CT
Ivy League regular season
January 11, 2025; 12:00 p.m., ESPNU/ESPN+		Brown	W 79–58	8–6 (1–0)	John J. Lee Amphitheater (1,402); New Haven, CT
January 18, 2025; 2:00 p.m., ESPN+		at Columbia	W 92–88	9–6 (2–0)	Levien Gymnasium (1,370); New York, NY
January 20, 2025; 2:00 p.m., ESPN+		Dartmouth	W 83–67	10–6 (3–0)	John J. Lee Amphitheater (1,597); New Haven, CT
January 25, 2025; 2:00 p.m., ESPN+		Harvard	W 84–55	11–6 (4–0)	John J. Lee Amphitheater (2,532); New Haven, CT
January 31, 2025; 5:00 p.m., ESPN2		at Princeton	W 77–70	12–6 (5–0)	Jadwin Gymnasium (3,212); Princeton, NJ
February 1, 2025; 6:00 p.m., ESPN+		at Penn	W 90–61	13–6 (6–0)	The Palestra (2,614); Philadelphia, PA
February 8, 2025; 2:00 p.m., ESPN+		at Cornell	W 103–88	14–6 (7–0)	Newman Arena (2,644); Ithaca, NY
February 14, 2025; 7:00 p.m., ESPN+		Penn	W 72–71	15–6 (8–0)	John J. Lee Amphitheater (1,409); New Haven, CT
February 15, 2025; 8:00 p.m., ESPNU		Princeton	W 84–57	16–6 (9–0)	John J. Lee Amphitheater (2,532); New Haven, CT
February 21, 2025; 7:00 p.m., ESPN+		Cornell	W 92–88	17–6 (10–0)	John J. Lee Amphitheater (2,098); New Haven, CT
February 22, 2025; 7:00 p.m., ESPN+		Columbia	W 90–64	18–6 (11–0)	John J. Lee Amphitheater (2,125); New Haven, CT
February 28, 2025; 5:00 p.m., ESPN+		at Dartmouth	W 72–67	19–6 (12–0)	Leede Arena (1,388); Hanover, NH
March 1, 2025; 4:00 p.m., ESPN+		at Harvard	L 69–74	19–7 (12–1)	Lavietes Pavilion (1,636); Cambridge, MA
March 8, 2025; 2:00 p.m., ESPN+		at Brown	W 70–61	20–7 (13–1)	Pizzitola Sports Center (1,589); Providence, RI
Ivy League Tournament
March 15, 2025; 11:00 a.m., ESPNU	(1)	vs. (4) Princeton; Semifinals	W 59–57	21–7	Pizzitola Sports Center (1,684); Providence, RI
March 16, 2025; 12:00 p.m., ESPN2	(1)	vs. (2) Cornell; Championship	W 90–84	22–7	Pizzitola Sports Center (1,739); Providence, RI
NCAA Tournament
March 20, 2025*; 7:25 p.m., TBS	(13 S)	vs. (4 S) No. 19 Texas A&M; First round	L 71–80	22–8	Ball Arena; Denver, CO
*Non-conference game. ^{#}Rankings from AP Poll. (#) Tournament seedings in parentheses. S=South. All times are in Eastern Time.
