= 2024–25 Harvard Crimson men's basketball team =

American college basketball season

2024–25 Harvard Crimson men's basketball
- Conference: Ivy League
- Record: 12–15 (7–7 Ivy)
- Head coach: Tommy Amaker (17th season)
- Assistant coaches: Mike Sotsky; Seth Towns; Matt Fraschilla
- Home arena: Lavietes Pavilion

2024–25 Ivy League men's basketball standings
	Conf.				Overall
Team	W		L	PCT	W		L	PCT
Yale †	13	–	1	.929	22	–	8	.733
Cornell	9	–	5	.643	18	–	11	.621
Dartmouth	8	–	6	.571	14	–	14	.500
Princeton	8	–	6	.571	19	–	11	.633
Harvard	7	–	7	.500	12	–	15	.444
Brown	6	–	8	.429	14	–	13	.519
Penn	4	–	10	.286	8	–	19	.296
Columbia	1	–	13	.071	12	–	15	.444
† 2025 Ivy League tournament winner

The 2024–25 Harvard Crimson men's basketball team represented Harvard University during the 2024–25 NCAA Division I men's basketball season. The Crimson, led by 17th-year head coach Tommy Amaker, played their home games at the Lavietes Pavilion located in Boston, Massachusetts as members of the Ivy League.

== Previous season ==
The Crimson finished the 2023–24 season 14–13, 5–9 in Ivy League play to place fifth. They failed to qualify for the Ivy League tournament.

== Roster ==
2024–25 Harvard Crimson men's basketball team
Players
Coaches

Pos.	#	Name	Height	Weight	Year	Hometown
G	3	Xavier Nesbitt	5 ft 11 in (1.8 m)	170 lb (77 kg)	So	Chicago, IL
G	4	Robert Hinton	6 ft 5 in (1.96 m)	190 lb (86 kg)	Fr	Los Angeles, CA
G	5	Ben Eisendrath	6 ft 2 in (1.88 m)	175 lb (79 kg)	Fr	Los Angeles, CA
F	6	Kenan Parrish	7 ft 0 in (2.13 m)	260 lb (118 kg)	Fr	Pittsboro, NC
G	7	Austin Hunt	6 ft 4 in (1.93 m)	185 lb (84 kg)	Fr	Marlborough, MA
G	8	Tey Barbour	6 ft 4 in (1.93 m)	190 lb (86 kg)	Fr	Manassas, VA
G	11	Evan Nelson	6 ft 2 in (1.88 m)	170 lb (77 kg)	Sr	Tucson, AZ
G	12	Dutch Dowdell	6 ft 6 in (1.98 m)	195 lb (88 kg)	Fr	Holladay, UT
G	13	Chandler Piggé	6 ft 5 in (1.96 m)	210 lb (95 kg)	Jr	Houston, TX
G	14	Greg Cooper	6 ft 0 in (1.83 m)	170 lb (77 kg)	Jr	Cambridge, MA
F	15	Thomas Batties II	6 ft 7 in (2.01 m)	215 lb (98 kg)	So	Washington, D.C.
F	17	Leo Byrne	6 ft 8 in (2.03 m)	195 lb (88 kg)	Fr	Stockholm, Sweden
G	23	Louis Lesmond	6 ft 6 in (1.98 m)	190 lb (86 kg)	Sr	Paris, France
G	24	Payton Pitts	6 ft 2 in (1.88 m)	180 lb (82 kg)	So	Chicago, IL
F	35	Luca Ace-Nasteski	6 ft 10 in (2.08 m)	225 lb (102 kg)	So	Manly, Australia

Head coach

- Tommy Amaker (Duke)

Assistant coach(es)

- Mike Sotsky (Harvard)
- Seth Towns (Harvard)
- Matt Fraschilla (Harvard)

Legend

- (C) Team captain
- (S) Suspended
- (I) Ineligible
- (W) Walk-on
- Injured
- Current redshirt

Roster
Last update: November 4, 2024

== Schedule and results ==
Date time, TV	Rank^{#}	Opponent^{#}	Result	Record	Site (attendance) city, state
Non-conference regular season
November 4, 2024*; 5:00 pm, ESPN+		Marist	W 79–66	1–0	Lavietes Pavilion (919); Boston, MA
November 8, 2024*; 8:30 pm, CBSSN		at Navy; Veterans Classic	L 80–85	1–1	Alumni Hall (3,010); Annapolis, MD
November 10, 2024*; 2:00 pm, ESPN+		at American	L 55–67	1–2	Bender Arena (3,319); Washington, D.C.
November 13, 2024*; 7:00 pm, NESN/FloHoops		at Northeastern	L 56–78	1–3	Matthews Arena (1,477); Boston, MA
November 17, 2024*; 2:00 pm, ESPN+		at Colorado	L 66–88	1–4	CU Events Center (6,288); Boulder, CO
November 22, 2024*; 7:00 pm, ESPN+		Colgate	W 78–67	2–4	Lavietes Pavilion (1,104); Boston, MA
November 27, 2024*; 4:00 pm, ESPN+		UMass	L 54–62	2–5	Lavietes Pavilion (1,636); Boston, MA
November 30, 2024*; 5:00 pm, Peacock		at St. John's	L 64–77	2–6	Carnesecca Arena (5,602); Queens, NY
December 4, 2024*; 6:00 pm, ESPN+		at Holy Cross	L 67–68	2–7	Hart Center (1,033); Worcester, MA
December 8, 2024*; 1:00 pm, ESPN+		at New Hampshire	W 72–62	3–7	Lundholm Gym (446); Durham, NH
December 21, 2024*; 3:00 pm, ESPN+		Furman	L 63–77	3–8	Lavietes Pavilion (1,187); Boston, MA
December 29, 2024*; 1:00 pm, ESPN+		at Iona	W 67–61	4–8	Hynes Athletics Center (1,610); New Rochelle, NY
January 5, 2025*; 2:00 pm, ESPN+		Bowdoin	W 71–65	5–8	Lavietes Pavilion (924); Boston, MA
Ivy League regular season
January 11, 2025; 2:00 pm, ESPN+		Princeton	L 64–68	5–9 (0–1)	Lavietes Pavilion (1,636); Boston, MA
January 18, 2025; 2:00 pm, ESPN+		at Brown	W 80–67	6–9 (1–1)	Pizzitola Sports Center (809); Providence, RI
January 20, 2025; 2:00 pm, ESPN+		Penn	L 67–82	6–10 (1–2)	Lavietes Pavilion (1,074); Boston, MA
January 25, 2025; 2:00 pm, ESPN+		at Yale	L 55–84	6–11 (1–3)	John J. Lee Amphitheater (2,532); New Haven, CT
January 31, 2025; 7:00 pm, ESPN+		at Columbia	W 90–82	7–11 (2–3)	Levien Gymnasium (2,417); New York, NY
February 1, 2025; 6:00 pm, ESPN+		at Cornell	L 60–75	7–12 (2–4)	Newman Arena (1,249); Ithaca, NY
February 8, 2025; 2:00 pm, ESPN+		at Dartmouth	L 56–76	7–13 (2–5)	Leede Arena (1,240); Hanover, NH
February 14, 2025; 7:00 pm, ESPN+		Cornell	W 75–73	8–13 (3–5)	Lavietes Pavilion (1,389); Boston, MA
February 15, 2025; 6:00 pm, ESPN+		Columbia	W 87–75	9–13 (4–5)	Lavietes Pavilion (1,200); Boston, MA
February 21, 2025; 7:00 pm, ESPN+		at Princeton	L 71–76	9–14 (4–6)	Jadwin Gymnasium (3,432); Princeton, NJ
February 22, 2025; 6:00 pm, ESPN+		at Penn	W 79–78 ^{OT}	10–14 (5–6)	The Palestra (2,347); Philadelphia, PA
February 28, 2025; 5:00 pm, ESPN+		Brown	L 52–59	10–15 (5–7)	Lavietes Pavilion (1,273); Boston, MA
March 1, 2025; 4:00 pm, ESPN+		Yale	W 74–69	11–15 (6–7)	Lavietes Pavilion (1,636); Boston, MA
March 8, 2025; 2:00 pm, ESPN+		Dartmouth	W 66–58	12–15 (7–7)	Lavietes Pavilion (1,460); Boston, MA
*Non-conference game. ^{#}Rankings from AP Poll. (#) Tournament seedings in parentheses. All times are in Eastern.
