= 2024–25 Dartmouth Big Green men's basketball team =

American college basketball season

2024–25 Dartmouth Big Green men's basketball
- Conference: Ivy League
- Record: 14–14 (8–6 Ivy)
- Head coach: David McLaughlin (8th season)
- Assistant coaches: Jabari Trotter; Rich Glesmann; Taurus Samuels
- Home arena: Leede Arena

2024–25 Ivy League men's basketball standings
	Conf.				Overall
Team	W		L	PCT	W		L	PCT
Yale †	13	–	1	.929	22	–	8	.733
Cornell	9	–	5	.643	18	–	11	.621
Dartmouth	8	–	6	.571	14	–	14	.500
Princeton	8	–	6	.571	19	–	11	.633
Harvard	7	–	7	.500	12	–	15	.444
Brown	6	–	8	.429	14	–	13	.519
Penn	4	–	10	.286	8	–	19	.296
Columbia	1	–	13	.071	12	–	15	.444
† 2025 Ivy League tournament winner

The 2024–25 Dartmouth Big Green men's basketball team represented Dartmouth College during the 2024–25 NCAA Division I men's basketball season. The Big Green, led by eighth-year head coach David McLaughlin, played their home games at Leede Arena in Hanover, New Hampshire as members of the Ivy League.

With the win on March 1, the Big Green clinched their first appearance in the Ivy League men's basketball tournament in school history. They lost to Cornell in the Ivy Semifinal to finish 14–14, the first non-losing season since the 1998–99 season.

== Previous season ==
The Big Green finished the 2023–24 season 6–21, 2–12 in Ivy League play to finish in eighth place. They failed to qualify for the Ivy League tournament.

== Roster ==
2024–25 Dartmouth Big Green men's basketball team
Players
Coaches

Pos.	#	Name	Height	Weight	Year	Hometown
G	0	Ben Brown	6 ft 2 in (1.88 m)	198 lb (90 kg)	So	Manchester, England
F	1	Patrick Tivnan Jr.	6 ft 8 in (2.03 m)	210 lb (95 kg)	So	Charlotte, North Carolina
F	2	Cade Haskins	6 ft 6 in (1.98 m)	220 lb (100 kg)	Sr	Minneapolis, Minnesota
G	3	Connor Amundsen	5 ft 11 in (1.8 m)	—	Fr	Fresno, California
G	4	Kareem Thomas	6 ft 5 in (1.96 m)	—	Fr	Wilmington, Delaware
G	5	Cameron McNamee	6 ft 6 in (1.98 m)	—	Fr	Mission Viejo, California
G	10	Ryan Cornish	6 ft 4 in (1.93 m)	170 lb (77 kg)	Sr	Potomac, Maryland
F	11	Connor Christensen	6 ft 6 in (1.98 m)	215 lb (98 kg)	Sr	Eden Prairie, Minnesota
F	15	Nikola Dimitrijevic	6 ft 10 in (2.08 m)	225 lb (102 kg)	Sr	Belgrade, Serbia
G	20	Romeo Myrthil	6 ft 2 in (1.88 m)	185 lb (84 kg)	Sr	Solna, Sweden
F	21	Brandon Mitchell-Day	6 ft 8 in (2.03 m)	205 lb (93 kg)	Jr	St. Louis, Missouri
F	22	Jayden Williams	6 ft 6 in (1.98 m)	185 lb (84 kg)	Jr	Windermere, Florida
G	22	Niko Abusara	6 ft 5 in (1.96 m)	185 lb (84 kg)	So	Chicago, Illinois
F	33	Jackson Munro	6 ft 8 in (2.03 m)	220 lb (100 kg)	Jr	Wilmette, Illinois
F	44	Shanon Simango	6 ft 8 in (2.03 m)	—	Fr	Maputo, Mozambique

Head coach

- David McLaughlin (Colby)

Assistant coach(es)

- Jabari Trotter (Dartmouth)
- Rich Glesmann (Emerson College)
- Taurus Samuels (Dartmouth)

Legend

- (C) Team captain
- (S) Suspended
- (I) Ineligible
- (W) Walk-on
- Injured
- Current redshirt

Roster
Last update: November 5, 2024

== Schedule and results ==
Date time, TV	Rank^{#}	Opponent^{#}	Result	Record	Site (attendance) city, state
Non-conference regular season
November 4, 2024*; 7:00 pm, ESPN+		VTSU–Lyndon	W 129–47	1–0	Leede Arena (741); Hanover, NH
November 9, 2024*; 1:00 pm, ESPN+		Sacred Heart	W 81–76	2–0	Leede Arena (802); Hanover, NH
November 13, 2024*; 5:00 pm, ESPN+		Albany	L 73–87	2–1	Leede Arena (721); Hanover, NH
November 16, 2024*; 1:00 pm, ESPN+		at Boston University	L 50–78	2–2	Case Gym (877); Boston, MA
November 19, 2024*; 7:00 pm, ESPN+		at Marist	L 62–75	2–3	McCann Arena (1,464); Poughkeepsie, NY
November 29, 2024*; 12:00 pm, ACCNX/ESPN+		at Boston College	W 88–83	3–3	Conte Forum (2,499); Chestnut Hill, MA
December 3, 2024*; 7:00 pm, ESPN+		at New Hampshire; Rivalry	W 69–65	4–3	Lundholm Gym (438); Durham, NH
December 8, 2024*; 5:00 pm, ESPN+		at UIC	L 68–69 ^{OT}	4–4	Credit Union 1 Arena (728); Chicago, IL
December 11, 2024*; 7:00 pm, ACCNX/ESPN+		at Notre Dame	L 65–77	4–5	Joyce Center (3,827); South Bend, IN
December 14, 2024*; 2:00 pm, ESPN+		at UMass Lowell	L 83–92	4–6	Costello Athletic Center (511); Lowell, MA
December 18, 2024*; 11:00 am, ESPN+		Le Moyne	L 76–80	4–7	Leede Arena (1,400); Hanover, NH
December 21, 2024*; 12:00 pm, ESPN+		Vermont	W 84–54	5–7	Leede Arena (1,127); Hanover, NH
January 1, 2025*; 5:00 pm, ESPN+		Colby–Sawyer	W 108–55	6–7	Leede Arena (1,088); Hanover, NH
Ivy League regular season
January 11, 2025; 2:00 pm, ESPN+		Penn	W 73–70	7–7 (1–0)	Leede Arena; Hanover, NH
January 18, 2025; 2:00 pm, ESPN+		Princeton	L 80–81	7–8 (1–1)	Leede Arena (1,337); Hanover, NH
January 20, 2025; 2:00 pm, ESPN+		at Yale	L 67–83	7–9 (1–2)	John J. Lee Amphitheater (1,597); New Haven, CT
January 25, 2025; 2:00 pm, ESPN+		at Brown	W 84–83	8–9 (2–2)	Pizzitola Sports Center; Providence, RI
January 31, 2025; 7:00 pm, ESPN+		at Cornell	L 64–76	8–10 (2–3)	Newman Arena; Ithaca, NY
February 1, 2025; 6:00 pm, ESPN+		at Columbia	W 95–89	9–10 (3–3)	Levien Gymnasium (1,242); New York, NY
February 8, 2025; 2:00 pm, ESPN+		Harvard	W 76–56	10–10 (4–3)	Leede Arena (1,240); Hanover, NH
February 14, 2025; 6:00 pm, ESPN+		Columbia	W 78–56	11–10 (5–3)	Leede Arena (844); Hanover, NH
February 15, 2025; 6:00 pm, ESPN+		Cornell	W 88–49	12–10 (6–3)	Leede Arena (1,018); Hanover, NH
February 21, 2025; 7:00 pm, ESPN+		at Penn	L 75–88	12–11 (6–4)	The Palestra (1,083); Philadelphia, PA
February 22, 2025; 8:00 pm, ESPN+		at Princeton	W 76–61	13–11 (7–4)	Jadwin Gymnasium (2,519); Princeton, NJ
February 28, 2025; 5:00 pm, ESPN+		Yale	L 67–72	13–12 (7–5)	Leede Arena (1,388); Hanover, NH
March 1, 2025; 4:00 pm, ESPN+		Brown	W 78–58	14–12 (8–5)	Leede Arena; Hanover, NH
March 8, 2025; 2:00 pm, ESPN+		at Harvard	L 58–66	14–13 (8–6)	Lavietes Pavilion (1,460); Cambridge, MA
Ivy League Tournament
March 15, 2025; 2:00 pm, ESPNews	(3)	vs. (2) Cornell; Semifinals	L 71–87	14–14	Pizzitola Sports Center (1,684); Providence, RI
*Non-conference game. ^{#}Rankings from AP Poll. (#) Tournament seedings in parentheses. All times are in Eastern.
