= 2024–25 Columbia Lions men's basketball team =

American college basketball season

2024–25 Columbia Lions men's basketball
- Conference: Ivy League
- Record: 12–15 (1–13 Ivy)
- Head coach: Jim Engles (8th season)
- Assistant coaches: Tobe Carberry; Jake Brown; Austin Nisbett; Jesse Agel
- Home arena: Levien Gymnasium

2024–25 Ivy League men's basketball standings
	Conf.				Overall
Team	W		L	PCT	W		L	PCT
Yale †	13	–	1	.929	22	–	8	.733
Cornell	9	–	5	.643	18	–	11	.621
Dartmouth	8	–	6	.571	14	–	14	.500
Princeton	8	–	6	.571	19	–	11	.633
Harvard	7	–	7	.500	12	–	15	.444
Brown	6	–	8	.429	14	–	13	.519
Penn	4	–	10	.286	8	–	19	.296
Columbia	1	–	13	.071	12	–	15	.444
† 2025 Ivy League tournament winner

The 2024–25 Columbia Lions men's basketball team represented Columbia University during the 2024–25 NCAA Division I men's basketball season. The Lions, led by eighth-year head coach Jim Engles, played their home games at Levien Gymnasium in New York City as members of the Ivy League.

== Previous season ==
The Lions finished the 2023–24 season 13–14, 4–10 in Ivy League play to finish in sixth place. They failed to qualify for the Ivy League tournament.

== Roster ==
2024–25 Columbia Lions men's basketball team
Players
Coaches

Pos.	#	Name	Height	Weight	Year	Hometown
G	0	Jaden Cooper	6 ft 3 in (1.91 m)	180 lb (82 kg)	Sr	Goldsboro, North Carolina
G	1	Avery Brown	6 ft 4 in (1.93 m)	190 lb (86 kg)	Jr	Beacon Falls, Connecticut
G	2	Kenny Noland	6 ft 2 in (1.88 m)	180 lb (82 kg)	Jr	Apex, North Carolina
F	3	Blair Thompson	6 ft 8 in (2.03 m)	210 lb (95 kg)	Jr	New York, New York
G	4	Gerald O'Keefe	6 ft 3 in (1.91 m)	195 lb (88 kg)	Fr	Nashville, Tennessee
G	5	Nicolo Romanelli	6 ft 2 in (1.88 m)	175 lb (79 kg)	So	Sydney, Australia
G	8	Josiah Cunningham	6 ft 2 in (1.88 m)	185 lb (84 kg)	Fr	Long Beach, California
F	11	Nigel Clarkson	6 ft 8 in (2.03 m)	185 lb (84 kg)		Fayetteville, North Carolina
G	12	Gianni Cobb	6 ft 0 in (1.83 m)	150 lb (68 kg)	Fr	Chicago, Illinois
F	14	Mason Ritter	6 ft 9 in (2.06 m)	240 lb (109 kg)	Fr	Bowling Green, Kentucky
G	15	Geronimo Rubio De La Rosa	6 ft 2 in (1.88 m)	180 lb (82 kg)	Sr	Santiago, Dominican Republic
F	20	Robbie Stankard	6 ft 9 in (2.06 m)	240 lb (109 kg)	Sr	Westwood, Massachusetts
G	21	Dan Vessey	6 ft 3 in (1.91 m)	195 lb (88 kg)	So	Plainsboro, New Jersey
F	22	Richard Nweke	6 ft 7 in (2.01 m)	220 lb (100 kg)	So	Anambra, Nigeria
F	23	Zine Eddine Bedri	6 ft 10 in (2.08 m)	235 lb (107 kg)	Jr	Tébessa, Algeria
F	24	Arop Arop	6 ft 11 in (2.11 m)	180 lb (82 kg)	So	Fort Worth, Texas
F/C	34	Jake Tavroff	6 ft 9 in (2.06 m)	245 lb (111 kg)	Sr	Oceanside, New York
F	35	Noah Robledo	6 ft 5 in (1.96 m)	205 lb (93 kg)	Sr	Leander, Texas

Head coach

- Jim Engles (Dickinson)

Assistant coach(es)

- Tobe Carberry (Vermont)
- Jake Brown (Middlebury)
- Austin Nisbett (Duke)
- Jesse Agel (Vermont)

Legend

- (C) Team captain
- (S) Suspended
- (I) Ineligible
- (W) Walk-on
- Injured
- Current redshirt

Roster
Last update: November 5, 2024

== Schedule and results ==
Date time, TV	Rank^{#}	Opponent^{#}	Result	Record	Site (attendance) city, state
Non-conference regular season
November 4, 2024*; 7:00 pm, ESPN+		at Loyola (MD)	W 81–78	1–0	Reitz Arena (1,104); Baltimore, MD
November 6, 2024*; 7:00 pm, CBSSN		at Villanova	W 90–80	2–0	Finneran Pavilion (6,501); Villanova, PA
November 9, 2024*; 2:00 pm, ESPN+		Delaware State	W 83–62	3–0	Levien Gymnasium (782); New York, NY
November 12, 2024*; 7:00 pm, ESPN+		Lehigh	W 76–75	4–0	Levien Gymnasium (702); New York, NY
November 16, 2024*; 12:00 pm, ESPN+		Mercyhurst	W 77–63	5–0	Levien Gymnasium (658); New York, NY
November 20, 2024*; 7:00 pm, NEC Front Row		at LIU	W 80–72	6–0	Steinberg Wellness Center; Brooklyn, NY
November 23, 2024*; 7:00 pm, SNY/ESPN+		Stony Brook	W 82–63	7–0	Levien Gymnasium (914); New York, NY
November 25, 2024*; 7:00 pm, ESPN+		New Hampshire	W 83–57	8–0	Levien Gymnasium (618); New York, NY
December 4, 2024*; 6:30 pm, ESPN+		at Albany	L 73–88	8–1	Broadview Center (2,027); Albany, NY
December 7, 2024*; 2:00 pm, ESPN+		Merchant Marine	W 98–49	9–1	Levien Gymnasium (637); New York, NY
December 9, 2024*; 7:00 pm, ESPN+		Sarah Lawrence	W 92–46	10–1	Levien Gymnasium (502); New York, NY
December 28, 2024*; 4:00 pm, ESPN+		Fairfield	W 85–72	11–1	Levien Gymnasium (1,185); New York, NY
December 30, 2024*; 5:00 pm, BTN		at Rutgers	L 64–91	11–2	Jersey Mike's Arena (8,000); Piscataway, NJ
Ivy League regular season
January 11, 2025; 2:00 pm, ESPN+		Cornell	L 83–94	11–3 (0–1)	Levien Gymnasium (1,786); New York, NY
January 18, 2025; 2:00 pm, ESPN+		Yale	L 88–92	11–4 (0–2)	Levien Gymnasium (1,370); New York, NY
January 20, 2025; 2:00 pm, ESPN+		at Princeton	L 67–71	11–5 (0–3)	Jadwin Gymnasium (3,811); Princeton, NJ
January 25, 2025; 2:00 pm, ESPN+		at Penn	L 78–93	11–6 (0–4)	The Palestra; Philadelphia, PA
January 31, 2025; 7:00 pm, ESPN+		Harvard	L 82–90	11–7 (0–5)	Levien Gymnasium (2,417); New York, NY
February 1, 2025; 6:00 pm, ESPN+		Dartmouth	L 89–95	11–8 (0–6)	Levien Gymnasium (1,242); New York, NY
February 8, 2025; 2:00 pm, ESPN+		Brown	W 74–72	12–8 (1–6)	Levien Gymnasium (1,347); New York, NY
February 14, 2025; 6:00 pm, ESPN+		at Dartmouth	L 56–78	12–9 (1–7)	Leede Arena (844); Hanover, NH
February 15, 2025; 6:00 pm, ESPN+		at Harvard	L 75–87	12–10 (1–8)	Lavietes Pavilion (1,200); Cambridge, MA
February 21, 2025; 7:00 pm, ESPN+		at Brown	L 61–86	12–11 (1–9)	Pizzitola Sports Center (1,118); Providence, RI
February 22, 2025; 7:00 pm, ESPN+		at Yale	L 64–90	12–12 (1–10)	John J. Lee Amphitheater (2,125); New Haven, CT
February 28, 2025; 7:00 pm, ESPN+		Princeton	L 68–73	12–13 (1–11)	Levien Gymnasium (2,574); New York, NY
March 1, 2025; 7:00 pm, ESPN+		Penn	L 87–92	12–14 (1–12)	Levien Gymnasium (1,514); New York, NY
March 8, 2025; 2:00 pm, ESPN+		at Cornell	L 81–100	12–15 (1–13)	Newman Arena (1,644); Ithaca, NY
*Non-conference game. ^{#}Rankings from AP Poll. (#) Tournament seedings in parentheses. All times are in Eastern Time.
