= 2024–25 Penn Quakers men's basketball team =

American college basketball season

2024–25 Penn Quakers men's basketball
- Conference: Ivy League
- Record: 8–19 (4–10 Ivy)
- Head coach: Steve Donahue (9th season)
- Associate head coach: Nat Graham
- Assistant coaches: Joe Mihalich Jr.; Kris Saulny
- Home arena: The Palestra

2024–25 Ivy League men's basketball standings
| | Conf. | | | | Overall |
| Team | W | | L | PCT | W | | L | PCT |
|---|---|---|---|---|---|---|---|---|
| Yale † | 13 | – | 1 | .929 | 22 | – | 8 | .733 |
| Cornell | 9 | – | 5 | .643 | 18 | – | 11 | .621 |
| Dartmouth | 8 | – | 6 | .571 | 14 | – | 14 | .500 |
| Princeton | 8 | – | 6 | .571 | 19 | – | 11 | .633 |
| Harvard | 7 | – | 7 | .500 | 12 | – | 15 | .444 |
| Brown | 6 | – | 8 | .429 | 14 | – | 13 | .519 |
| Penn | 4 | – | 10 | .286 | 8 | – | 19 | .296 |
| Columbia | 1 | – | 13 | .071 | 12 | – | 15 | .444 |
† 2025 Ivy League tournament winner

The 2024–25 Penn Quakers men's basketball team represented the University of Pennsylvania during the 2024–25 NCAA Division I men's basketball season. The Quakers, led by ninth-year head coach Steve Donahue, played their home games at The Palestra in Philadelphia, Pennsylvania as members of the Ivy League. They finished the season 8–19, 4–10 in Ivy League play to finish in seventh place.

On March 10, 2025, the school fired head coach Steve Donahue. On March 27, the school named former Iowa head coach Penn alum Fran McCaffery the team's new head coach.

== Previous season ==
The Quakers finished the 2023–24 season 11–18, 3–11 in Ivy League play, to finish in seventh place. They failed to qualify for the Ivy League tournament.

== Roster ==
2024–25 Penn Quakers men's basketball team
Players
Coaches

| Pos. | # | Name | Height | Weight | Year | Hometown |
|---|---|---|---|---|---|---|
| G | 0 | AJ Levine | 6 ft 0 in (1.83 m) | 180 lb (82 kg) | Fr | Elmhurst, IL |
| G | 1 | Alex Massung | 6 ft 4 in (1.93 m) | 190 lb (86 kg) | Fr | West Orange, NJ |
| G | 2 | Dylan Williams | 5 ft 11 in (1.8 m) | 180 lb (82 kg) | Jr | Columbia, SC |
| F | 3 | Johnnie Walter | 6 ft 10 in (2.08 m) | 215 lb (98 kg) | Jr | Agoura Hills, CA |
| G | 5 | Cam Thrower | 6 ft 3 in (1.91 m) | 195 lb (88 kg) | Jr | Manhattan Beach, CA |
| G/F | 7 | Michael Zanoni | 6 ft 5 in (1.96 m) | 200 lb (91 kg) | Jr | Charlotte, NC |
| G | 11 | Sam Brown | 6 ft 3 in (1.91 m) | 185 lb (84 kg) | So | Merion Station, PA |
| F/C | 13 | Nick Spinoso | 6 ft 9 in (2.06 m) | 245 lb (111 kg) | Sr | Port Washington, NY |
| F | 15 | Bradyn Foster | 6 ft 8 in (2.03 m) | 240 lb (109 kg) | Fr | Natrona Heights, PA |
| G/F | 23 | Ethan Roberts | 6 ft 5 in (1.96 m) | 195 lb (88 kg) | Jr | Arlington Heights, IL |
| G | 24 | Reese McMullen | 6 ft 3 in (1.91 m) | 185 lb (84 kg) | Sr | Memphis, TN |
| F | 25 | Augustus Gerhart | 6 ft 9 in (2.06 m) | 235 lb (107 kg) | So | Denver, PA |
| C | 33 | Michelangelo Oberti | 6 ft 10 in (2.08 m) | 230 lb (104 kg) | Fr | Riva di Solto, Italy |
| F/C | 34 | Chris Ubochi | 6 ft 9 in (2.06 m) | 220 lb (100 kg) | Jr | Lagos, Nigeria |
| G/F | 35 | Niklas Polonowski | 6 ft 6 in (1.98 m) | 210 lb (95 kg) | So | La Grange, IL |
| G | 40 | George Smith | 6 ft 4 in (1.93 m) | 210 lb (95 kg) | Sr | Salem, NH |

Head coach

- Steve Donahue (Ursinus)

Assistant coach(es)

- Nat Graham (Penn)
- Joe Mihalich Jr. (Nazareth)
- Kris Saulny (Widener)

Legend

- (C) Team captain
- (S) Suspended
- (I) Ineligible
- (W) Walk-on
- Injured
- Current redshirt

Roster
Last update: November 5, 2024

== Schedule and results ==
| Date time, TV | Rank^{#} | Opponent^{#} | Result | Record | Site (attendance) city, state |
Non-conference regular season
| November 4, 2024*; 7:00 p.m., ESPN+ | | at NJIT | W 58–57 | 1–0 | Wellness and Events Center (545); Newark, NJ |
| November 7, 2024*; 7:00 p.m., ESPN+ | | Maryland Eastern Shore | W 85–84 | 2–0 | The Palestra (932); Philadelphia, PA |
| November 12, 2024*; 7:00 p.m., ESPN+ | | at Lafayette | L 63–65 | 2–1 | Kirby Sports Center (1,575); Easton, PA |
| November 15, 2024*; 8:00 p.m., ESPN+/NBCSPHI | | Saint Joseph's; Big 5 Classic Pod 2 | L 69–86 | 2–2 | The Palestra (3,056); Philadelphia, PA |
| November 19, 2024*; 7:00 p.m., Peacock | | at Villanova; Big 5 Classic Pod 2 | L 49–93 | 2–3 | Finneran Pavilion (6,501); Philadelphia, PA |
| November 29, 2024*; 4:30 p.m., ESPN+ | | Navy; Cathedral of College Basketball Classic | L 78–86 | 2–4 | The Palestra (1,649); Philadelphia, PA |
| November 30, 2024*; 4:30 p.m., ESPN+ | | Maine; Cathedral of College Basketball Classic | W 77–64 | 3–4 | The Palestra (931); Philadelphia, PA |
| December 1, 2024*; 2:30 p.m., ESPN+ | | Elon; Cathedral of College Basketball Classic | L 53–68 | 3–5 | The Palestra (597); Philadelphia, PA |
| December 7, 2024*; 2:00 p.m., NBCSPHI | | vs. Drexel; Big 5 Classic – 5th-place game | L 47–60 | 3–6 | Wells Fargo Center; Philadelphia, PA |
| December 9, 2024*; 7:00 p.m., ESPN+ | | VCU | L 47–66 | 3–7 | Siegel Center (7,016); Richmond, VA |
| December 20, 2024*; 6:00 p.m., ESPN+ | | Rider | W 79–66 | 4–7 | The Palestra (699); Philadelphia, PA |
| December 22, 2024*; 2:00 p.m., ESPN+ | | at George Mason | L 53–85 | 4–8 | EagleBank Arena (2,955); Fairfax, VA |
| December 29, 2024*; 1:00 p.m., Peacock | | at Penn State | L 66–86 | 4–9 | Bryce Jordan Center (7,862); State College, PA |
Ivy League regular season
| January 11, 2025; 2:00 p.m., ESPN+ | | at Dartmouth | L 70–73 | 4–10 (0–1) | Leede Arena; Hanover, NH |
| January 18, 2025; 2:00 p.m., ESPN+ | | Cornell | L 76–86 | 4–11 (0–2) | The Palestra (2,339); Philadelphia, PA |
| January 20, 2025; 2:00 p.m., ESPN+ | | at Harvard | W 82–67 | 5–11 (1–2) | Lavietes Pavilion (1,074); Cambridge, MA |
| January 25, 2025; 2:00 p.m., ESPN+ | | Columbia | W 93–78 | 6–11 (2–2) | The Palestra; Philadelphia, PA |
| January 31, 2025; 7:00 p.m., ESPN+ | | Brown | L 79–88 | 6–12 (2–3) | The Palestra (1,750); Philadelphia, PA |
| February 1, 2025; 6:00 p.m., ESPN+ | | Yale | L 61–90 | 6–13 (2–4) | The Palestra (2,614); Philadelphia, PA |
| February 7, 2025; 5:00 p.m., ESPN+ | | Princeton; Rivalry | L 59–61 | 6–14 (2–5) | The Palestra (3,475); Philadelphia, PA |
| February 14, 2025; 7:00 p.m., ESPN+ | | at Yale | L 71–72 | 6–15 (2–6) | John J. Lee Amphitheater (1,409); New Haven, CT |
| February 15, 2025; 6:00 p.m., ESPN+ | | at Brown | L 72–82 | 6–16 (2–7) | Pizzitola Sports Center (953); Providence, RI |
| February 21, 2025; 7:00 p.m., ESPN+ | | Dartmouth | W 88–75 | 7–16 (3–7) | The Palestra (1,083); Philadelphia, PA |
| February 22, 2025; 6:00 p.m., ESPN+ | | Harvard | L 78–79 ^{OT} | 7–17 (3–8) | The Palestra (2,347); Philadelphia, PA |
| February 28, 2025; 7:00 p.m., ESPN+ | | at Cornell | L 62–90 | 7–18 (3–9) | Newman Arena (1,666); Ithaca, NY |
| March 1, 2025; 7:00 p.m., ESPN+ | | at Columbia | W 92–87 | 8–18 (4–9) | Levien Gymnasium (1,514); New York, NY |
| March 8, 2025; 2:00 p.m., ESPN+ | | at Princeton; Rivalry | L 71–95 | 8–19 (4–10) | Jadwin Gymnasium (3,649); Princeton, NJ |
*Non-conference game. ^{#}Rankings from AP poll. (#) Tournament seedings in parentheses. All times are in Eastern.
