= 2024–25 Princeton Tigers men's basketball team =

American college basketball season

2024–25 Princeton Tigers men's basketball
- Conference: Ivy League
- Record: 19–11 (8–6 Ivy)
- Head coach: Mitch Henderson (13th season)
- Associate head coach: Brett MacConnell
- Assistant coaches: Luke Gore; Lawrence Rowley
- Home arena: Jadwin Gymnasium

2024–25 Ivy League men's basketball standings
	Conf.				Overall
Team	W		L	PCT	W		L	PCT
Yale †	13	–	1	.929	22	–	8	.733
Cornell	9	–	5	.643	18	–	11	.621
Dartmouth	8	–	6	.571	14	–	14	.500
Princeton	8	–	6	.571	19	–	11	.633
Harvard	7	–	7	.500	12	–	15	.444
Brown	6	–	8	.429	14	–	13	.519
Penn	4	–	10	.286	8	–	19	.296
Columbia	1	–	13	.071	12	–	15	.444
† 2025 Ivy League tournament winner

The 2024–25 Princeton Tigers men's basketball team represented Princeton University during the 2024–25 NCAA Division I men's basketball season. The Tigers, led by 13th-year head coach Mitch Henderson, played their home games at Jadwin Gymnasium in Princeton, New Jersey as members of the Ivy League.

== Previous season ==
The Tigers finished the 2023–24 season 24–5, 12–2 in Ivy League play to finish as Ivy League regular season champions. In the Ivy League tournament, they were defeated by Brown in the semifinals. They received a bid to the National Invintational Tournament, were they lost to UNLV in the first round.

== Roster ==
2024–25 Princeton Tigers men's basketball team
Players
Coaches

Pos.	#	Name	Height	Weight	Year	Hometown
G	0	Ryan Duncan	6 ft 3 in (1.91 m)	185 lb (84 kg)	So	Chicago, Illinois
G	1	Xaivian Lee	6 ft 4 in (1.93 m)	180 lb (82 kg)	Jr	Toronto, Canada
G	2	Peyton Seals	6 ft 4 in (1.93 m)	212 lb (96 kg)	Fr	Wyckoff, New Jersey
F	3	Caden Pierce	6 ft 7 in (2.01 m)	220 lb (100 kg)	Jr	Glen Ellyn, Illinois
F	4	CJ Happy	6 ft 9 in (2.06 m)	226 lb (103 kg)	Fr	Sterling, Massachusetts
G	5	Zio Kim	6 ft 4 in (1.93 m)	160 lb (73 kg)	Fr	Basking Ridge, New Jersey
F	7	Malik Abdullahi	6 ft 7 in (2.01 m)	207 lb (94 kg)	Fr	Miami, Florida
G	9	Jack Scott	6 ft 6 in (1.98 m)	210 lb (95 kg)	Jr	Pelican Island, New Jersey
G	11	Darius Gakwasi	6 ft 6 in (1.98 m)	200 lb (91 kg)	Sr	Portland, Oregon
F	12	Jacob Huggins	6 ft 8 in (2.03 m)	225 lb (102 kg)	So	Oak Park, California
G	13	Deven Austin	6 ft 6 in (1.98 m)	200 lb (91 kg)	So	Vernon, Connecticut
G	21	Jack Stanton	6 ft 2 in (1.88 m)	184 lb (83 kg)	Fr	Downers Grove, Illinois
G	22	Dalen Davis	6 ft 0 in (1.83 m)	190 lb (86 kg)	So	Chicago, Illinois
G	24	Blake Peters	6 ft 1 in (1.85 m)	192 lb (87 kg)	Sr	Evanston, Illinois
G	33	Jackson Hicke	6 ft 5 in (1.96 m)	200 lb (91 kg)	So	Radnor, Pennsylvania
F	43	Philip Byriel	6 ft 9 in (2.06 m)	230 lb (104 kg)	Sr	Drums, Pennsylvania

Head coach

- Mitch Henderson (Princeton)

Assistant coach(es)

- Brett MacConnell (Rutgers)
- Luke Gore (Bethel (IN))
- Lawrence Rowley (Emory)

Legend

- (C) Team captain
- (S) Suspended
- (I) Ineligible
- (W) Walk-on
- Injured
- Current redshirt

Roster
Last update: November 1, 2024

== Schedule and results ==
Date time, TV	Rank^{#}	Opponent^{#}	Result	Record	Site (attendance) city, state
Non-conference regular season
November 4, 2024*; 7:00 pm, ESPN+		Iona	W 81–80	1–0	Jadwin Gymnasium (1,690); Princeton, NJ
November 8, 2024*; 8:30 pm, YouTube		vs. Duquesne; Jersey Jam	W 75–68	2–0	CURE Insurance Arena (2,247); Trenton, NJ
November 10, 2024*; 2:00 pm, NESN+/FloHoops		at Northeastern	W 79–76	3–0	Matthews Arena (1,732); Boston, MA
November 15, 2024*; 7:00 pm, ESPN+		Loyola Chicago	L 68–73	3–1	Jadwin Gymnasium (2,472); Princeton, NJ
November 17, 2024*; 1:00 pm, ESPN+		at Merrimack	W 68–57	4–1	Hammel Court (1,824); North Andover, MA
November 21, 2024*; 8:00 pm, ESPN+		vs. Wright State; Myrtle Beach Invitational quarterfinals	L 62–80	4–2	HTC Center (1,367); Conway, SC
November 22, 2024*; 7:30 pm, ESPN+		vs. Texas State; Myrtle Beach Invitational consolation 2nd round	L 80–83	4–3	HTC Center (1,352); Conway, SC
November 24, 2024*; 10:30 a.m., ESPNU		vs. Portland; Myrtle Beach Invitational 7th place game	W 94–67	5–3	HTC Center (627); Conway, SC
November 27, 2024*; 4:00 pm, ESPN+		Nazareth	W 99–63	6–3	Jadwin Gymnasium (1,490); Princeton, NJ
December 3, 2024*; 7:00 pm, ESPN+		at Saint Joseph's	W 77–69	7–3	Hagan Arena (2,176); Philadelphia, PA
December 7, 2024*; 4:00 pm, ESPN+		at Furman	L 63–69	7–4	Timmons Arena (3,227); Greenville, SC
December 10, 2024*; 7:00 pm, ESPN+		Monmouth	W 71–67	8–4	Jadwin Gymnasium (1,523); Princeton, NJ
December 21, 2024*; 12:00 pm, FS1		vs. Rutgers; Never Forget Tribute Classic/Rivalry	W 83–82	9–4	Prudential Center (10,148); Newark, NJ
December 30, 2024*; 1:00 pm, ESPN+		Akron	W 76–75	10–4	Jadwin Gymnasium (2,677); Princeton, NJ
January 4, 2025*; 11:30 am, ESPN+		Kean	W 92–71	11–4	Jadwin Gymnasium (1,896); Princeton, NJ
Ivy League regular season
January 11, 2025; 2:00 pm, ESPN+		at Harvard	W 68–64	12–4 (1–0)	Lavietes Pavilion (1,636); Cambridge, MA
January 18, 2025; 2:00 pm, ESPN+		at Dartmouth	W 81–80	13–4 (2–0)	Leede Arena (1,337); Hanover, NH
January 20, 2025; 2:00 pm, ESPN+		Columbia	W 71–67	14–4 (3–0)	Jadwin Gymnasium (3,811); Princeton, NJ
January 25, 2025; 2:00 pm, ESPN+		Cornell	L 76–85	14–5 (3–1)	Jadwin Gymnasium; Princeton, NJ
January 31, 2025; 5:00 pm, ESPN2		Yale	L 70–77	14–6 (3–2)	Jadwin Gymnasium (3,212); Princeton, NJ
February 1, 2025; 5:00 pm, ESPN+		Brown	W 69–49	15–6 (4–2)	Jadwin Gymnasium (4,506); Princeton, NJ
February 7, 2025; 7:00 pm, ESPN+		at Penn; Rivalry	W 61–59	16–6 (5–2)	The Palestra (3,475); Philadelphia, PA
February 14, 2025; 7:00 pm, ESPN+		at Brown	L 56–70	16–7 (5–3)	Pizzitola Sports Center (1,356); Providence, RI
February 15, 2025; 8:00 pm, ESPNU		at Yale	L 57–84	16–8 (5–4)	John J. Lee Amphitheater (2,532); New Haven, CT
February 21, 2025; 7:00 pm, ESPN+		Harvard	W 76–71	17–8 (6–4)	Jadwin Gymnasium (3,432); Princeton, NJ
February 22, 2025; 8:00 pm, ESPN+		Dartmouth	L 61–76	17–9 (6–5)	Jadwin Gymnasium (2,519); Princeton, NJ
February 28, 2025; 7:00 pm, ESPN+		at Columbia	W 73–68	18–9 (7–5)	Levien Gymnasium (2,574); New York, NY
March 2, 2025; 2:00 pm, ESPN+		at Cornell	L 70–102	18–10 (7–6)	Newman Arena (2,449); Ithaca, NY
March 8, 2025; 2:00 pm, ESPN+		Penn; Rivalry	W 95–71	19–10 (8–6)	Jadwin Gymnasium (3,649); Princeton, NJ
Ivy League Tournament
March 15, 2025; 11:00 am, ESPNU	(4)	vs. (1) Yale; Semifinals	L 57–59	19–11	Pizzitola Sports Center (1,684); Providence, RI
*Non-conference game. ^{#}Rankings from AP Poll. (#) Tournament seedings in parentheses. All times are in Eastern.
