= 2024–25 Cornell Big Red men's basketball team =

American college basketball season

2024–25 Cornell Big Red men's basketball
- Conference: Ivy League
- Record: 18–11 (9–5 Ivy)
- Head coach: Jon Jaques (1st season)
- Associate head coach: Mike Brennan
- Assistant coaches: Mark McGonigal; Jalen Hayes
- Home arena: Newman Arena

2024–25 Ivy League men's basketball standings
	Conf.				Overall
Team	W		L	PCT	W		L	PCT
Yale †	13	–	1	.929	22	–	8	.733
Cornell	9	–	5	.643	18	–	11	.621
Dartmouth	8	–	6	.571	14	–	14	.500
Princeton	8	–	6	.571	19	–	11	.633
Harvard	7	–	7	.500	12	–	15	.444
Brown	6	–	8	.429	14	–	13	.519
Penn	4	–	10	.286	8	–	19	.296
Columbia	1	–	13	.071	12	–	15	.444
† 2025 Ivy League tournament winner

The 2024–25 Cornell Big Red men's basketball team represented Cornell University in the 2024–25 NCAA Division I men's basketball season. The Big Red, led by first-year head coach Jon Jaques, played their home games at Newman Arena in Ithaca, New York, as members of the Ivy League.

== Previous season ==
The Big Red finished the 2023–24 season 22–6, 11–3 in Ivy League play to finish in third place. They were defeated by Yale in the semifinals of the Ivy League tournament. They received a bid to the National Invitation Tournament, were they lost to Ohio State in the first round.

On March 23, 2024, Big Red head coach Brian Earl left the school to become the head coach at William & Mary. On April 6, the school named Jon Jaques the team's next head coach.

== Roster ==
2024–25 Cornell Big Red men's basketball team
Players
Coaches

Pos.	#	Name	Height	Weight	Year	Hometown
G	1	Nazir Williams	6 ft 3 in (1.91 m)	185 lb (84 kg)	Sr	Nyack, New York
F	2	Ian Imegwu	6 ft 9 in (2.06 m)	238 lb (108 kg)	So	Short Hills, New Jersey
F/C	3	Ryan Kiachian	6 ft 10 in (2.08 m)	232 lb (105 kg)	Sr	Los Altos Hills, California
F	4	Gioacchino Panzini	6 ft 5 in (1.96 m)	200 lb (91 kg)	Fr	Spring Lake, New Jersey
G	5	Jacob Beccles	6 ft 3 in (1.91 m)	183 lb (83 kg)	So	Philadelphia, Pennsylvania
G	6	Mateen Rafiq	6 ft 0 in (1.83 m)	155 lb (70 kg)	Fr	Sacramento, California
G	7	Anthony Nimani	6 ft 4 in (1.93 m)	186 lb (84 kg)	Fr	Meriden, Connecticut
G	8	Adam Hinton	6 ft 4 in (1.93 m)	215 lb (98 kg)	Jr	Studio City, California
F	10	Hayden Franson	6 ft 8 in (2.03 m)	218 lb (99 kg)	Sr	American Fork, Utah
F/C	11	Ty Iwanonkiw	6 ft 9 in (2.06 m)	202 lb (92 kg)	Fr	Pittsburgh, Pennsylvania
F	12	AK Okereke	6 ft 7 in (2.01 m)	241 lb (109 kg)	Jr	Clovis, California
G/F	13	AJ Rodriguez	6 ft 6 in (1.98 m)	205 lb (93 kg)	Fr	Westchester, New York
G	14	Corbin Zentner	5 ft 9 in (1.75 m)	167 lb (76 kg)	Jr	Alpine, Utah
F	21	Guy Ragland Jr.	6 ft 8 in (2.03 m)	253 lb (115 kg)	Sr	West Hartford, Connecticut
G	22	Jake Fiegen	6 ft 4 in (1.93 m)	205 lb (93 kg)	So	Wilmette, Illinois
F	23	DJ Nix	6 ft 6 in (1.98 m)	224 lb (102 kg)	Jr	Harrisburg, North Carolina
G	24	Josh Baldwin	6 ft 5 in (1.96 m)	240 lb (109 kg)	Jr	Everett, Massachusetts
G	25	Max Watson	6 ft 4 in (1.93 m)	195 lb (88 kg)	Sr	Brigham City, Utah
G	31	Cooper Noard	6 ft 2 in (1.88 m)	195 lb (88 kg)	Jr	Glenview, Illinois
F	33	Chris Cain	6 ft 8 in (2.03 m)	225 lb (102 kg)	Sr	Middletown, New York
F/C	34	AJ LaBeau	6 ft 10 in (2.08 m)	222 lb (101 kg)	So	Boise, Idaho

Head coach

- Jon Jaques (Cornell)

Assistant coach(es)

- Mike Brennan (Princeton)
- Mark McGonigal (Richmond)
- Jalen Hayes (Drexel)

Legend

- (C) Team captain
- (S) Suspended
- (I) Ineligible
- (W) Walk-on
- Injured
- Current redshirt

Roster
Last update: November 4, 2024

== Schedule and results ==
Date time, TV	Rank^{#}	Opponent^{#}	Result	Record	Site (attendance) city, state
Non-conference regular season
November 4, 2024*; 7:00 pm, ESPN+		Marywood	W 93–52	1–0	Newman Arena (555); Ithaca, NY
November 8, 2024*; 6:00 pm, ESPN+		Samford	W 88–86	2–0	Newman Arena (964); Ithaca, NY
November 12, 2024*; 6:30 pm, ESPN+		at La Salle	L 77–93	2–1	John Glaser Arena; Philadelphia, PA
November 16, 2024*; 12:00 pm, ESPN+		Lafayette	W 81–71	3–1	Newman Arena; Ithaca, NY
November 21, 2024*; 6:00 pm, ESPN+		Robert Morris	L 76–86	3–2	Newman Arena; Ithaca, NY
November 25, 2024*; 7:00 pm, ESPN+		at Iona	W 84–68	4–2	Hynes Athletics Center (2,000); New Rochelle, NY
November 27, 2024*; 7:00 pm, ACCNX/ESPN+		at Syracuse	L 72–82	4–3	JMA Wireless Dome (14,318); Syracuse, NY
December 4, 2024*; 7:00 pm, ESPN+		at Colgate	W 84–57	5–3	Cotterell Court (907); Hamilton, NY
December 8, 2024*; 1:00 pm, ESPN+		at Army	W 103–84	6–3	Christl Arena (300); West Point, NY
December 10, 2024*; 10:00 pm, ACCNX/ESPN+		at California	W 88–80	7–3	Haas Pavilion (3,035); Berkeley, CA
December 22, 2024*; 12:00 pm, ESPN+		Illinois State	L 77–80	7–4	Newman Arena (568); Ithaca, NY
December 30, 2024*; 4:00 pm, ESPN+		Siena	L 77–83	7–5	Newman Arena (1,257); Ithaca, NY
January 5, 2025*; 2:00 pm, ESPN+		Penn State Schuylkill	W 123–71	8–5	Newman Arena (726); Ithaca, NY
Ivy League regular season
January 11, 2025; 2:00 pm, ESPN+		at Columbia	W 94–83	9–5 (1–0)	Levien Gymnasium (1,786); New York, NY
January 18, 2025; 2:00 pm, ESPN+		at Penn	W 86–76	10–5 (2–0)	The Palestra (2,339); Philadelphia, PA
January 20, 2024; 2:00 pm, ESPN+		Brown	L 82–83	10–6 (2–1)	Newman Arena; Ithaca, NY
January 25, 2025; 2:00 pm, ESPN+		at Princeton	W 85–76	11–6 (3–1)	Jadwin Gymnasium; Princeton, NJ
January 31, 2025; 7:00 pm, ESPN+		Dartmouth	W 76–64	12–6 (4–1)	Newman Arena; Ithaca, NY
February 1, 2025; 6:00 pm, ESPN+		Harvard	W 75–60	13–6 (5–1)	Newman Arena (1,249); Ithaca, NY
February 8, 2025; 2:00 pm, ESPN+		Yale	L 88–103	13–7 (5–2)	Newman Arena (2,644); Ithaca, NY
February 14, 2025; 7:00 pm, ESPN+		at Harvard	L 73–75	13–8 (5–3)	Lavietes Pavilion (1,389); Cambridge, MA
February 15, 2025; 5:00 pm, ESPN+		at Dartmouth	L 49–88	13–9 (5–4)	Leede Arena (1,018); Hanover, NH
February 21, 2025; 7:00 pm, ESPN+		at Yale	L 88–92	13–10 (5–5)	John J. Lee Amphitheater (2,098); New Haven, CT
February 22, 2025; 6:00 pm, ESPN+		at Brown	W 85–81	14–10 (6–5)	Pizzitola Sports Center (1,328); Providence, RI
February 28, 2025; 7:00 pm, ESPN+		Penn	W 90–62	15–10 (7–5)	Newman Arena (1,666); Ithaca, NY
March 2, 2025; 2:00 pm, ESPNU		Princeton	W 102–70	16–10 (8–5)	Newman Arena (2,449); Ithaca, NY
March 8, 2025; 2:00 pm, ESPN+		Columbia	W 100–81	17–10 (9–5)	Newman Arena (1,644); Ithaca, NY
Ivy League Tournament
March 15, 2025; 2:00 pm, ESPNews	(2)	vs. (3) Dartmouth; Semifinals	W 87–71	18–10	Pizzitola Sports Center (1,684); Providence, RI
March 16, 2025; 12:00 pm, ESPN2	(2)	vs. (1) Yale; Championship	L 84–90	18–11	Pizzitola Sports Center (1,739); Providence, RI
*Non-conference game. ^{#}Rankings from AP Poll. (#) Tournament seedings in parentheses. All times are in Eastern.
