= Bez Mbeng =

American basketball player (born 2003)

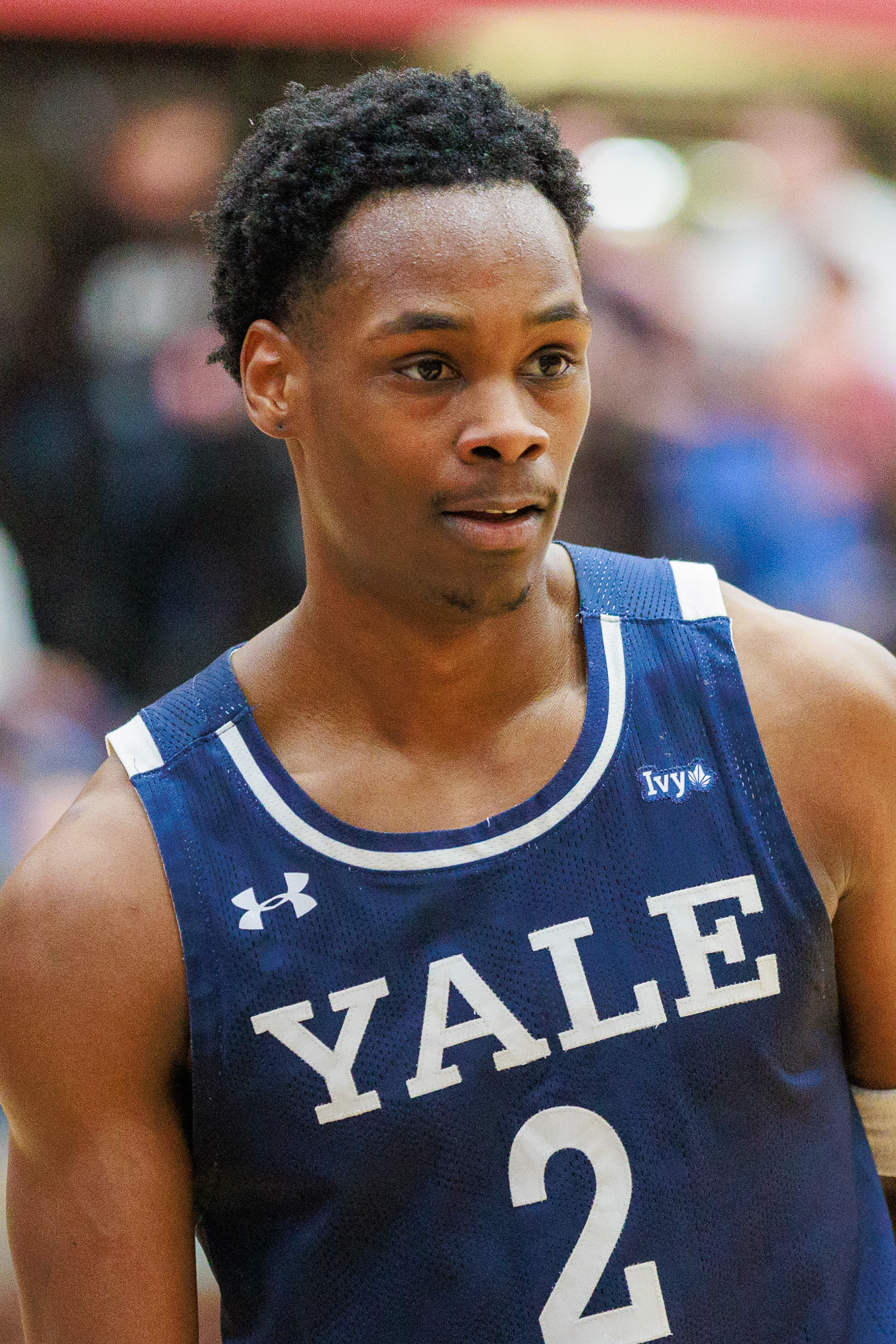
- Mbeng in 2025

No. 3 – Sioux Falls Skyforce
- Position: Shooting guard
- League: NBA G League

Personal information
- Born: May 2, 2003 (age 23) Potomac, Maryland, U.S.
- Listed height: 6 ft 4 in (1.93 m)
- Listed weight: 185 lb (84 kg)

Career information
- High school: Our Lady of Good Counsel (Olney, Maryland)
- College: Yale (2021–2025)
- NBA draft: 2025: undrafted
- Playing career: 2025–present

Career history
- 2025–present: Sioux Falls Skyforce
- 2026: Utah Jazz

Career highlights
- Ivy League Player of the Year (2025); First-team All-Ivy League (2025); Second-team All-Ivy League (2024); 3× Ivy League Defensive Player of the Year (2023–2025)
- Stats at NBA.com
- Stats at Basketball Reference

Bez Mbeng (born May 2, 2003) is an American professional basketball player for the Sioux Falls Skyforce of the NBA G League. He played college basketball for the Yale Bulldogs. He has previously played in the National Basketball Association (NBA) for the Charlotte Hornets.

== High school career ==
Mbeng played at Our Lady of Good Counsel High School and was coached by GJ Kissal. He was named to the first team All-Washington Catholic Athletic Conference as a junior. Mbeng committed to play college basketball at Yale over Harvard, despite receiving several scholarship offers.

== College career ==
Mbeng came off the bench as a freshman at Yale. He averaged 10.4 points, 4.2 rebounds, and 3.2 assists per game as a sophomore. Mbeng was named Ivy League Defensive Player of the Year.

As a junior, he averaged 11.1 points, 4.2 rebounds, 4.1 assists, and 1.9 steals per game. Mbeng was named to the Second Team All-Ivy League as well as repeating as defensive player of the year. On February 8, 2025, he recorded the second triple-double in program history with 15 points, 12 assists and 10 rebounds in a 103–88 win over Cornell. Mbeng was named Ivy League Player of the Year, Ivy League Defensive Player of the Year as well as First Team All-Ivy League.

== Professional career ==
=== Utah Jazz (2026) ===
On March 13, 2026, Mbeng signed a 10-day contract with the Utah Jazz. Immediately after his signing, Mbeng made his debut with the team, getting four points, rebounds, and assists in 34 minutes of play time in a 114-124 loss against the Portland Trail Blazers. On March 21, Mbeng made his first start for the Jazz against the Philadelphia 76ers, where he scored 13 points, grabbed six rebounds, and dished out seven assists in 45 minutes of play time. After appearing in five games, averaging 4.8 points, 4.2 assists, 4.0 rebounds, and 1.6 steals in 33.4 minutes per game, the Jazz signed Mbeng to a second 10-day contract on March 23. On April 10, Mbeng recorded a triple-double with a career-high 27 points, 11 rebounds, and 11 assists off the bench in a 147–101 win over the Memphis Grizzlies. His teammate, John Konchar, also recorded a triple-double with 11 points, 11 rebounds, and 10 assists off the bench, making Mbeng and Konchar the first pair of teammates to each record a triple-double off the bench in a game in NBA history. After his performances with the team, The Jazz later signed Mbeng to a two-year contract on April 3, clearing the way for him to also play in the 2026 NBA Summer League. He made 15 total appearances for Utah, averaging 8.1 points, 3.8 rebounds, and 4.1 assists. On June 29, the Jazz declined their team option on Mbeng, making him a free agent.

=== Sioux Falls Skyforce (2026–present) ===
On September 9, 2026, Mbeng signed an Exhibit 10 contract with the Charlotte Hornets. He was waived by the Hornets on September 20. On September 22, Mbeng was claimed off of waivers by the Miami Heat.

== Career statistics ==
Legend
GP	Games played	GS	Games started	MPG	Minutes per game
FG%	Field goal percentage	3P%	3-point field goal percentage	FT%	Free throw percentage
RPG	Rebounds per game	APG	Assists per game	SPG	Steals per game
BPG	Blocks per game	PPG	Points per game	**Bold**	Career high

=== NBA ===
Year	Team	GP	GS	MPG	FG%	3P%	FT%	RPG	APG	SPG	BPG	PPG
2025–26	Utah	15	5	32.8	.500	.194	.640	3.8	4.1	2.3	.3	8.1
Career		15	5	32.8	.500	.194	.640	3.8	4.1	2.3	.3	8.1

=== College ===
Year	Team	GP	GS	MPG	FG%	3P%	FT%	RPG	APG	SPG	BPG	PPG
2021-22	Yale	28	17	19.9	**.431**	.269	**.717**	3.1	1.9	1.3	.3	4.8
2022-23	Yale	30	30	28.6	.430	.323	.646	4.2	3.2	1.4	.3	10.4
2023-24	Yale	**33**	**33**	32.5	.421	.252	.686	4.2	4.1	1.9	.3	11.1
2024-25	Yale	29	29	**32.7**	.429	**.368**	.699	**5.6**	**5.8**	**1.8**	**.4**	**13.0**
Career		120	109	28.6	.427	.306	.684	4.3	3.7	1.6	.3	9.9
