= 2024–25 Ivy League men's basketball season =

- League: NCAA Division I
- Sport: Basketball
- Teams: 8
- TV partner: Ivy League Digital Network

Regular season
- Champions: Yale
- Season MVP: Bez Mbeng, Yale

2024 Ivy League men's basketball tournament
- Champions: Yale
- Runners-up: Cornell

Basketball seasons
- 2023–24 2025–26

The 2024–25 Ivy League men's basketball season marked the continuation of the annual tradition of competitive basketball among Ivy League members. The tradition began when the league was formed during the 1956–57 season and its history extends to the predecessor Eastern Intercollegiate Basketball League, which was formed in 1902.

Yale earned the league title after finishing the regular season a league-best 13–1. In the 2025 "Ivy Madness," the Ivy League's basketball tournament, Yale defeated fourth-seed Princeton 59–57 in the semifinals before defeating second-seed Cornell 90–84 to clinch the Ivy League's autobid to the 2025 NCAA Men's Division I Basketball Tournament. This was the first time Yale secured back-to-back Ivy Madness championships. Yale lost Texas A&M 80–71 in the first round of the tournament.

Bez Mbeng of Yale was named Ivy League Men's Basketball Player of the Year.

== NCAA tournament ==
Seed	Region	School	First Four	Round of 64	Round of 32	Sweet 16	Elite Eight	Final Four	Championship
13	South	Yale	n/a	Eliminated by Texas A&M, 80–71					
		W–L (%):	0–0 –	0–1 .000	0–0 –	0–0 –	0–0 –	0–0 –	0–0 –Total:1-1 .500
