= John Ashton (diplomat) =

British diplomat

John Ashton, CBE (born 7 November 1956) was the Special Representative for Climate Change at the UK Foreign and Commonwealth Office (FCO) from 2006 to June 2012, Director for Strategic Partnerships at LEAD International, and is the founder and CEO of Third Generation Environmentalism (E3G).

== Education ==
John Ashton was born in London on 7 November 1956, and educated at the Royal Grammar School, Newcastle, and St John's College, Cambridge, where he read Natural Sciences specialising in theoretical physics. On graduation in 1977, he spent a year as a research astronomer at the new Cavendish Laboratory.

== Diplomatic career ==
John Ashton joined HM Diplomatic Service in 1978 and spent two years at the FCO in London. In 1980, he was sent to Hong Kong as a Language Student. From 1981 to 1984, he was posted as Third Secretary later Second Secretary to the British Embassy in Beijing, where he served as science officer. He was China desk officer at the FCO from 1984 to 1986. As First Secretary, he was seconded to the UK Cabinet Office from 1986 to 1988. Ashton was then posted to the British Embassy in Rome until 1993, where he carried out the first ever study for the British Government of the Mafia and the dangers it posed to British interests.

From 1993 to 1997, John Ashton was seconded to the Hong Kong Government as Deputy Political Adviser to Governor Chris Patten, dealing with matters relating to Hong Kong's transition to Chinese sovereignty. He was closely involved in all major dealings between the UK and China concerning Hong Kong. During this period, his interest in the environment drew him towards the diplomacy of global climate change. In 1998 he became Head of Environment, Science and Energy Department (ESED) in the FCO; which he then took the initiative in 2000 to restructure as Environment Policy Department (EPD) in 2000.

John Ashton left the FCO in 2002 to found E3G, an independent not-for-profit organisation that works in the public interest to accelerate the global transition to sustainable development. In June 2006, Ashton rejoined the FCO and was appointed Special Representative for Climate Change by Foreign Secretary, Margaret Beckett.

Ashton was appointed Commander of the Order of the British Empire (CBE) in the 2012 Birthday Honours for services to international climate change.

== Climate adviser ==
Ashton is a Member of the Green College Centre for Environmental Policy and Understanding. He also serves on the advisory boards of the Climate Institute, Washington, D.C., and of the UK Tyndall Centre for Climate Change Research.

== Politics ==
Prior to the 2015 general election, he was one of several celebrities who endorsed the parliamentary candidacy of the Green Party's Caroline Lucas.

== Family ==
He married Kao Fengning (Judy)in 1983. They have a son, John (b. 1986). Her son by her first marriage, Graham, is John's stepson.
