= 2021–22 Princeton Tigers men's basketball team =

American college basketball season

2021–22 Princeton Tigers men's basketball

Ivy League regular season champions

NIT, First Round
- Conference: Ivy League
- Record: 23–7 (12–2 Ivy)
- Head coach: Mitch Henderson (10th season)
- Associate head coach: Brett MacConnell
- Assistant coaches: Skye Ettin; Jonathan Jones
- Home arena: Jadwin Gymnasium

2021–22 Ivy League men's basketball standings
	Conf.				Overall
Team	W		L	PCT	W		L	PCT
Princeton	12	–	2	.857	23	–	7	.767
Yale †	11	–	3	.786	19	–	12	.613
Penn	9	–	5	.643	12	–	16	.429
Cornell	7	–	7	.500	15	–	11	.577
Dartmouth	6	–	8	.429	9	–	16	.360
Harvard	5	–	9	.357	13	–	13	.500
Brown	5	–	9	.357	13	–	16	.448
Columbia	1	–	13	.071	4	–	22	.154
† 2022 Ivy League Tournament winner

The 2021–22 Princeton Tigers men's basketball team represented Princeton University in the 2021–22 NCAA Division I men's basketball season. The Tigers, led by 10th-year head coach Mitch Henderson, played their home games at Jadwin Gymnasium in Princeton, New Jersey as members of the Ivy League.

== Previous season ==
Due to the COVID-19 pandemic, the Ivy League chose not to conduct a season in 2020–21.

== Roster ==
2021–22 Princeton Tigers men's basketball team
Players
Coaches

Pos.	#	Name	Height	Weight	Year	Hometown
G	0	Darius Gakwasi	6 ft 6 in (1.98 m)	195 lb (88 kg)	Fr	Portland, Oregon
G	1	Garrett Johnson	6 ft 8 in (2.03 m)	210 lb (95 kg)	Fr	Oakton, Virginia
F	2	Leyi Adebayo	6 ft 7 in (2.01 m)	210 lb (95 kg)	So	Melbourne, Australia
G	3	Ryan Langborg	6 ft 4 in (1.93 m)	186 lb (84 kg)	Jr	San Diego, California
G	4	Matt Allocco	6 ft 4 in (1.93 m)	200 lb (91 kg)	So	Hilliard, Ohio
F	5	Drew Friberg	6 ft 7 in (2.01 m)	210 lb (95 kg)	Sr	State College, Pennsylvania
G	10	Charlie Bagin	6 ft 1 in (1.85 m)	170 lb (77 kg)	Sr	Glen Ridge, New Jersey
G	11	Konrad Kiszka	6 ft 7 in (2.01 m)	210 lb (95 kg)	Jr	Newtown, Pennsylvania
G	13	Jaelin Llewellyn	6 ft 2 in (1.88 m)	185 lb (84 kg)	Fr	Mississauga, Ontario
G	14	Ethan Wright	6 ft 4 in (1.93 m)	190 lb (86 kg)	Sr	Newton Centre, Massachusetts
F	20	Tosan Evbuomwan	6 ft 8 in (2.03 m)	217 lb (98 kg)	Jr	Newcastle, England
G	24	Blake Peters	6 ft 1 in (1.85 m)	190 lb (86 kg)	Fr	Evanston, Illinois
F	25	Jacob O'Connell	6 ft 11 in (2.11 m)	240 lb (109 kg)	Jr	Voorhees, New Jersey
F	31	Elijah Barnes	6 ft 7 in (2.01 m)	215 lb (98 kg)	Sr	Freehold Borough, New Jersey
F	32	Keeshawn Kellman	6 ft 9 in (2.06 m)	235 lb (107 kg)	Jr	Allentown, Pennsylvania
G	40	Max Johns	6 ft 4 in (1.93 m)	205 lb (93 kg)	Sr	High Point, North Carolina
F	43	Philip Byriel	6 ft 9 in (2.06 m)	215 lb (98 kg)	Fr	Drums, Pennsylvania
F	44	Mason Hooks	6 ft 10 in (2.08 m)	240 lb (109 kg)	Fr	Los Angeles, California
F	54	Zach Martini	6 ft 7 in (2.01 m)	235 lb (107 kg)	So	Warren, New Jersey

Head coach

- Mitch Henderson (Princeton)

Assistant coach(es)

- Brett MacConnell (Rutgers)
- Skye Ettin (TCNJ)
- Jonathan Jones (Kean)

Legend

- (C) Team captain
- (S) Suspended
- (I) Ineligible
- (W) Walk-on
- Injured
- Current redshirt

Roster
Last update: November 7, 2021

== Schedule and results ==
Date time, TV	Rank^{#}	Opponent^{#}	Result	Record	Site (attendance) city, state
Non-conference regular season
November 9, 2021*; 7:00 pm, ESPN+		Rutgers–Camden	W 94–28	1–0	Jadwin Gymnasium (950); Princeton, NJ
November 12, 2021*; 9:30 pm, ESPNews		vs. South Carolina; Asheville Championship semifinals	W 66–62	2–0	Harrah's Cherokee Center; Asheville, NC
November 14, 2021*; 7:30 pm, ESPN2		vs. Minnesota; Asheville Championship Game	L 80–87 ^{2OT}	2–1	Harrah's Cherokee Center; Asheville, NC
November 17, 2021*; 7:00 pm, ESPN+		Marist	W 80–61	3–1	Jadwin Gymnasium (953); Princeton, NJ
November 21, 2021*; 3:00 pm, P12N		at Oregon State	W 81–80	4–1	Gill Coliseum (3,368); Corvallis, OR
November 24, 2021*; 7:00 pm, ESPN3		at Monmouth	L 64–76	4–2	OceanFirst Bank Center (2,234); West Long Branch, NJ
November 28, 2021*; 4:00 pm, ESPN+		Fairleigh Dickinson	W 89–79	5–2	Jadwin Gymnasium (1,347); Princeton, NJ
December 1, 2021*; 7:00 pm, FloHoops		at Hofstra	L 77–81	5–3	Mack Sports Complex (1,775); Hempstead, NY
December 4, 2021*; 4:00 pm, ESPN+		Drexel	W 81–79 ^{OT}	6–3	Jadwin Gymnasium (1,312); Princeton, NJ
December 7, 2021*; 7:00 pm, ESPN+		Bucknell	W 82–69	7–3	Jadwin Gymnasium (1,126); Princeton, NJ
December 11, 2021*; 2:00 pm, ESPN+		at Lafayette	W 84–73	8–3	Kirby Sports Center (1,345); Easton, PA
December 13, 2021*; 6:00 pm, ESPN+		UMBC	W 89–77	9–3	Jadwin Gymnasium (891); Princeton, NJ
December 21, 2021*; 7:00 pm, ESPN+		Kean	W 100–59	10–3	Jadwin Gymnasium (917); Princeton, NJ
Ivy League regular season
January 7, 2022; 7:00 pm, NBCSPHI/ESPN+		Columbia	W 84–69	11–3 (1–0)	Jadwin Gymnasium (35); Princeton, NJ
January 8, 2022; 6:00 pm, ESPN+		Cornell	W 72–70	12–3 (2–0)	Jadwin Gymnasium (42); Princeton, NJ
January 15, 2022; 4:00 pm, ESPN+		Brown	W 76–74	13–3 (3–0)	Jadwin Gymnasium (56); Princeton, NJ
January 17, 2022; 4:00 pm, ESPN+		Penn	W 74–64	14–3 (4–0)	Jadwin Gymnasium (167); Princeton, NJ
January 22, 2022; 7:00 pm, ESPN+		at Dartmouth	W 84–80	15–3 (5–0)	Leede Arena (327); Hanover, NH
January 29, 2022; 4:00 pm, ESPN+		Yale	L 74–80	15–4 (5–1)	Jadwin Gymnasium (241); Princeton, NJ
February 4, 2022; 7:00 pm, ESPN+		at Cornell	L 83–88	15–5 (5–2)	Newman Arena (864); Ithaca, NY
February 5, 2022; 7:00 pm, ESPN+		Columbia	W 85–63	16–5 (6–2)	Levien Gymnasium (84); New York, NY
February 12, 2022; 4:00 pm, ESPN+		Dartmouth	W 85–40	17–5 (7–2)	Jadwin Gymnasium (936); Princeton, NJ
February 18, 2022; 7:00 pm, ESPN+		at Brown	W 69–50	18–5 (8–2)	Pizzitola Sports Center (475); Providence, RI
February 19, 2022; 7:00 pm, ESPN+		at Yale	W 81–75	19–5 (9–2)	John J. Lee Amphitheater (1,268); New Haven, CT
February 25, 2022; 7:00 pm, ESPNews/ESPN+		Harvard	W 74–67	20–5 (10–2)	Jadwin Gymnasium (2,262); Princeton, NJ
February 27, 2022; 12:00 pm, ESPN+		at Harvard	W 74–73	21–5 (11–2)	Lavietes Pavilion (1,177); Allston, MA
March 5, 2022; 6:00 pm, ESPN+		at Penn	W 93–70	22–5 (12–2)	The Palestra (3,911); Philadelphia, PA
Ivy League Tournament
March 12, 2022; 11:00 am, ESPNU	(1)	vs. (4) Cornell; Semifinals	W 77–73	23–5	Lavietes Pavilion (1,160); Boston, MA
March 13, 2022; 12:00 pm, ESPN2	(1)	vs. (2) Yale; Championship	L 64–66	23–6	Lavietes Pavilion (1,350); Boston, MA
NIT
March 15, 2022*; 7:00 pm, ESPNU		at (3) VCU; First Round – Texas A&M Bracket	L 79–90	23–7	Siegel Center (2,743); Richmond, VA
*Non-conference game. ^{#}Rankings from AP Poll. (#) Tournament seedings in parentheses. All times are in Eastern.
