= 2021–22 Ivy League men's basketball season =

- League: NCAA Division I
- Sport: Basketball
- Number of teams: 8
- TV partner: Ivy League Digital Network

Regular season
- Champions: Princeton
- Season MVP: Tosan Evbuomwan, Princeton

2022 Ivy League men's basketball tournament
- Champions: Yale
- Runners-up: Princeton

Basketball seasons
- ← 2019–20 2022–23 →

2021–22 Ivy League men's basketball standings
	Conf.				Overall
Team	W		L	PCT	W		L	PCT
Princeton	12	–	2	.857	23	–	7	.767
Yale †	11	–	3	.786	19	–	12	.613
Penn	9	–	5	.643	12	–	16	.429
Cornell	7	–	7	.500	15	–	11	.577
Dartmouth	6	–	8	.429	9	–	16	.360
Harvard	5	–	9	.357	13	–	13	.500
Brown	5	–	9	.357	13	–	16	.448
Columbia	1	–	13	.071	4	–	22	.154
† 2022 Ivy League Tournament winner

The 2021–22 Ivy League men's basketball season marked the continuation of the annual tradition of competitive basketball among Ivy League members after the league did not play during the 2020–21 season. Previously, the tradition began when the league was formed during the 1956–57 season and its history extends to the predecessor Eastern Intercollegiate Basketball League, which was formed in 1902.

Princeton earned the league title after finishing the regular season 12–2 within the Ivy League. However, Yale earned the league's bid to the 2022 NCAA Division I men's basketball tournament after defeating Pennsylvania, 67–61, in the semifinals and Princeton, 66–64, in the finals of the inaugural conference tournament.

Tosan Evbuomwan of Princeton was named Ivy League Men's Basketball Player of the Year.

== All-Ivy Teams ==
First Team All-Ivy
	School	Class	Position
Jordan Dingle*	Penn	Sophomore	Guard
Noah Kirkwood*	Harvard	Senior	Guard
Tosan Evbuomwan*	Princeton	Junior	Forward
Azar Swain*	Yale	Senior	Guard
Jaelin Llewellyn*	Princeton	Senior	Guard

*Unanimous

Second Team All-Ivy
	School	Class	Position
Tamenang Choh	Brown	Senior	Forward
Jalen Gabbidon	Yale	Senior	Guard
Ethan Wright	Princeton	Senior	Guard
Brendan Barry	Dartmouth	Senior	Guard
Jaylan Gainey	Brown	Senior	Forward
Dean Noll	Cornell	Senior	Guard

== NCAA tournament ==
Seed	Region	School	First Four	Round of 64	Round of 32	Sweet 16	Elite Eight	Final Four	Championship
13	West	Yale	n/a	Eliminated by Purdue, 78–56					
		W–L (%):	0–0 –	0–1 .000	0–0 –	0–0 –	0–0 –	0–0 –	0–0 –Total:0-1 .000
