= 2021–22 Penn Quakers men's basketball team =

American college basketball season

2021–22 Penn Quakers men's basketball
- Conference: Ivy League
- Record: 12–16 (9–5 Ivy)
- Head coach: Steve Donahue (6th season)
- Associate head coach: Nat Graham
- Assistant coaches: Joe Mihalich; Trey Montgomery
- Home arena: The Palestra

2021–22 Ivy League men's basketball standings
	Conf.				Overall
Team	W		L	PCT	W		L	PCT
Princeton	12	–	2	.857	23	–	7	.767
Yale †	11	–	3	.786	19	–	12	.613
Penn	9	–	5	.643	12	–	16	.429
Cornell	7	–	7	.500	15	–	11	.577
Dartmouth	6	–	8	.429	9	–	16	.360
Harvard	5	–	9	.357	13	–	13	.500
Brown	5	–	9	.357	13	–	16	.448
Columbia	1	–	13	.071	4	–	22	.154
† 2022 Ivy League Tournament winner

The 2021–22 Penn Quakers men's basketball team represented the University of Pennsylvania in the 2021–22 NCAA Division I men's basketball season. The Quakers, led by sixth-year head coach Steve Donahue, played their home games at The Palestra in Philadelphia, Pennsylvania as members of the Ivy League.

== Previous season ==
Due to the COVID-19 pandemic, the Ivy League chose not to conduct a season in 2020–21.

== Roster ==
2021–22 Penn Quakers men's basketball team
Players
Coaches

Pos.	#	Name	Height	Weight	Year	Hometown
G	0	Clark Slajchert	6 ft 1 in (1.85 m)	160 lb (73 kg)	So	Thousand Oaks, CA
G	1	Colin Chambers	6 ft 0 in (1.83 m)	185 lb (84 kg)	So	Malvern, PA
G	2	Jonah Charles	6 ft 4 in (1.93 m)	180 lb (82 kg)	Jr	Roselle, NJ
G	3	Jordan Dingle	6 ft 3 in (1.91 m)	195 lb (88 kg)	So	Valley Stream, NY
C	4	Max Lorca-Lloyd	6 ft 9 in (2.06 m)	215 lb (98 kg)	Jr	Melbourne, FL
G	5	Jelani Williams	6 ft 5 in (1.96 m)	200 lb (91 kg)	Sr	Washington, D.C.
G	10	Alex Imegwu	6 ft 6 in (1.98 m)	220 lb (100 kg)	Sr	Short Hills, NJ
F	11	Michael Moshkovitz	6 ft 7 in (2.01 m)	220 lb (100 kg)	Jr	Jerusalem, Israel
F/C	12	Gus Larson	6 ft 10 in (2.08 m)	205 lb (93 kg)	Fr	New Canaan, CT
F/C	13	Nick Spinoso	6 ft 9 in (2.06 m)	240 lb (109 kg)	Fr	Port Washington, NY
G/F	14	Max Martz	6 ft 6 in (1.98 m)	220 lb (100 kg)	So	Upper Arlington, OH
G	15	Andrew Laczkowski	6 ft 6 in (1.98 m)	190 lb (86 kg)	So	Dallas, TX
G	21	Bryce Washington	6 ft 4 in (1.93 m)	185 lb (84 kg)	Sr	Southfield, MI
G	22	Lucas Monroe	6 ft 6 in (1.98 m)	200 lb (91 kg)	Jr	Huntingdon Valley, PA
F	23	Michael Wang	6 ft 10 in (2.08 m)	230 lb (104 kg)	Sr	Taiyuan, China
G	24	Reese McMullen	6 ft 3 in (1.91 m)	180 lb (82 kg)	Fr	Memphis, TN
G/F	25	Eddie III Holland	6 ft 6 in (1.98 m)	205 lb (93 kg)	Fr	Philadelphia, PA
G	34	Griffin Ryan	6 ft 5 in (1.96 m)	230 lb (104 kg)	Sr	Winnetka, IL
G	40	George Smith	6 ft 4 in (1.93 m)	200 lb (91 kg)	Fr	Salem, NH

Head coach

- Steve Donahue (Ursinus)

Assistant coach(es)

- Nat Graham (Penn)
- Joe Mihalich (Nazareth)
- Trey Montgomery (Samford)

Legend

- (C) Team captain
- (S) Suspended
- (I) Ineligible
- (W) Walk-on
- Injured
- Current redshirt

Roster
Last update: October 30, 2021

== Schedule and results ==
Date time, TV	Rank^{#}	Opponent^{#}	Result	Record	Site (attendance) city, state
Exhibition
October 30, 2021*; 5:00 p.m.		East Stroudsburg	W 91–83	–	The Palestra (523); Philadelphia, PA
Regular season
November 10, 2021*; 9:00 p.m., ACCN		at No. 20 Florida State	L 70–105	0–1	Donald L. Tucker Center (9,746); Tallahassee, FL
November 12, 2021*; 7:00 p.m., ESPN+		at George Mason	L 66–87	0–2	EagleBank Arena (4,053); Fairfax, VA
November 14, 2021*; 2:00 p.m., ESPN+		at Bucknell	W 73–68	1–2	Sojka Pavilion (1,406); Lewisburg, PA
November 16, 2021*; 7:00 p.m., ESPN+		Lafayette	W 85–57	2–2	The Palestra (1,791); Philadelphia, PA
November 18, 2021*; 2:30 p.m., ESPNU		vs. Utah State; Myrtle Beach Invitational quarterfinals	L 79–87 ^{2OT}	2–3	HTC Center (1,156); Conway, SC
November 19, 2021*; 2:30 p.m., ESPNU		vs. Davidson; Myrtle Beach Invitational consolation second round	L 60–72	2–4	HTC Center (1,131); Conway, SC
November 21, 2021*; 12:30 p.m., ESPNews		vs. Old Dominion; Myrtle Beach Invitational 7th-place game	W 71–63	3–4	HTC Center; Conway, SC
November 23, 2021*; 2:00 p.m., FloHoops		at Towson	L 61–76	3–5	SECU Arena (1,121); Towson, MD
November 28, 2021*; 3:00 p.m., SECN		at No. 13 Arkansas	L 60–76	3–6	Bud Walton Arena (19,200); Fayetteville, AR
December 1, 2021*; 7:00 p.m., ESPN+		No. 6 Villanova; Philadelphia Big 5	L 56–71	3–7	The Palestra (6,255); Philadelphia, PA
December 4, 2021*; 4:00 p.m., ESPNU		at Temple; Philadelphia Big 5	L 72–81	3–8	Liacouras Center (4,421); Philadelphia, PA
December 8, 2021*; 7:00 p.m., ESPN+		at Saint Joseph's; Philadelphia Big 5	L 71–78	3–9	Hagan Arena (1,450); Philadelphia, PA
December 11, 2021*; 2:00 p.m., ESPN+		at La Salle; Philadelphia Big 5	L 74–76	3–10	Tom Gola Arena (2,617); Philadelphia, PA
December 28, 2021*; 2:00 p.m.		James Madison	Canceled due to COVID-19 protocols at James Madison		The Palestra; Philadelphia, PA
December 31, 2021*; 1:00 p.m., ESPN+		Eastern	Canceled due to COVID-19 protocols at Eastern		The Palestra; Philadelphia, PA
January 2, 2022; 3:00 p.m., ESPN+		Brown	W 77–73	4–10 (1–0)	The Palestra (125); Philadelphia, PA
January 4, 2022*; 7:00 p.m., ESPN+		Howard	Canceled due to COVID-19 protocols at Howard		The Palestra; Philadelphia, PA
January 7, 2022; 7:00 p.m., ESPN+		Cornell	W 79–65	5–10 (2–0)	The Palestra (125); Philadelphia, PA
January 8, 2022; 6:00 p.m., ESPN+		Columbia	L 69–73	5–11 (2–1)	The Palestra (125); Philadelphia, PA
January 15, 2022; 2:00 p.m., ESPN+		Dartmouth	W 78–68	6–11 (3–1)	The Palestra (150); Philadelphia, PA
January 17, 2022; 4:00 p.m., ESPN+		at Princeton	L 64–74	6–12 (3–2)	Jadwin Gymnasium (167); Princeton, NJ
January 22, 2022; 4:00 p.m., ESPN+/NBCSPHI+		Yale	W 76–68	7–12 (4–2)	The Palestra (125); Philadelphia, PA
January 28, 2022; 5:00 p.m., ESPNU		at Harvard	W 78–74	8–12 (5–2)	Lavietes Pavilion (1,636); Allston, MA
February 4, 2022; 7:00 p.m., ESPN+		at Columbia	W 81–66	9–12 (6–2)	Levien Gymnasium (101); New York, NY
February 5, 2022; 6:00 p.m., ESPN+		at Cornell	W 73–68	10–12 (7–2)	Newman Arena (899); Ithaca, NY
February 12, 2022; 2:00 p.m., ESPN+/NBCSPHI+		Harvard	W 82–74	11–12 (8–2)	The Palestra (2,776); Philadelphia, PA
February 18, 2022; 7:00 p.m., ESPN+		at Yale	L 72–81	11–13 (8–3)	John J. Lee Amphitheater; New Haven, CT
February 19, 2022; 6:00 p.m., ESPN+		at Brown	W 89–88	12–13 (9–3)	Pizzitola Sports Center (710); Providence, RI
February 26, 2022; 2:00 p.m., ESPN+		at Dartmouth	L 70–84	12–14 (9–4)	Leede Arena (784); Hanover, NH
March 5, 2022; 6:00 p.m., ESPN+/NBCSPHI+		Princeton	L 70–93	12–15 (9–5)	The Palestra (3,911); Philadelphia, PA
Ivy League tournament
March 12, 2022; 2:00 p.m., ESPNU	(3)	vs. (2) Yale; Semifinals	L 61–67	12–16	Lavietes Pavilion; Boston, MA
*Non-conference game. ^{#}Rankings from AP poll. (#) Tournament seedings in parentheses. All times are in Eastern.
