= 2022 Ivy League men's basketball tournament =

- Classification: Division I
- Season: 2021–22
- Teams: 4
- Site: Lavietes Pavilion; Boston, Massachusetts
- Champions: Yale (2nd title)
- Winning coach: James Jones (2nd title)
- Television: ESPNU, ESPN2, ESPN+

2021–22 Ivy League men's basketball standings
	Conf.				Overall
Team	W		L	PCT	W		L	PCT
Princeton	12	–	2	.857	23	–	7	.767
Yale †	11	–	3	.786	19	–	12	.613
Penn	9	–	5	.643	12	–	16	.429
Cornell	7	–	7	.500	15	–	11	.577
Dartmouth	6	–	8	.429	9	–	16	.360
Harvard	5	–	9	.357	13	–	13	.500
Brown	5	–	9	.357	13	–	16	.448
Columbia	1	–	13	.071	4	–	22	.154
† 2022 Ivy League Tournament winner

The 2022 Ivy League men's basketball tournament was the postseason men's basketball tournament for the Ivy League of the 2021–22 NCAA Division I men's basketball season. It was held March 12–13, 2022, at the Lavietes Pavilion on the campus of Harvard University in Boston. (Note: Although Harvard's overall administration and undergraduate campus are in Cambridge, Massachusetts, the athletic department offices and almost all athletic venues, including Lavietes Pavilion, lie within the city limits of Boston.) The tournament champions, the Yale Bulldogs, received the conference's automatic bid to the 2022 NCAA tournament. This marks the first Ivy-league tournament (men's or women's) that was not won by a team that was at least co-regular season champion.

== Seeds ==
The top four teams in the Ivy League regular-season standings qualify for the tournament and are seeded according to their records in conference play, resulting in a Shaughnessy playoff. If a tie for any of the top four positions exists, tiebreakers are applied in the following order:

- Head-to-head record between teams involved in the tie.
- Record against the top team(s) not involved in the tie in order of conference record, going down through the seedings until the tie is broken.
- Average of the teams' ranking in the following computer systems: NCAA NET, Sagarin, KenPom, and ESPN Basketball Percentage Index.

Seed	School	Record	Tiebreaker
1	Princeton	12–2	
2	Yale	11–3	
3	Penn	9–5	
4	Cornell	7–7	

== Schedule ==
Session	Game	Time	Matchup	Score	Television	Attendance
Semifinals – Saturday, March 12
1	1	11:00 am	No. 1 Princeton vs. No. 4 Cornell	77–73	ESPNU/ESPN+	
1	2	2:00 pm	No. 2 Yale vs. No. 3 Penn	67–61	ESPNU/ESPN+	
Championship – Sunday, March 13
2	3	12:00 pm	No. 1 Princeton vs. No. 2 Yale	64–66	ESPN2/ESPN+	
Game times in Eastern Time. Rankings denote tournament seeding.

== Bracket ==
Semifinals; Saturday, March 12; ESPNU/ESPN+
1	Princeton	77
4	Cornell	73
2	Yale	67
3	Penn	61

Championship; Sunday, March 13; ESPN2/ESPN+
1	Princeton	64
2	Yale	66

== See also ==
- 2022 Ivy League women's basketball tournament
