= 2021–22 Yale Bulldogs men's basketball team =

American college basketball season

2021–22 Yale Bulldogs men's basketball

Ivy League tournament champions

NCAA tournament, First Round
- Conference: Ivy League
- Record: 19–12 (11–3 Ivy)
- Head coach: James Jones (22nd season)
- Associate head coach: Matt Kingsley
- Assistant coaches: Justin Simon; Alington Paul
- Home arena: John J. Lee Amphitheater

2021–22 Ivy League men's basketball standings
	Conf.				Overall
Team	W		L	PCT	W		L	PCT
Princeton	12	–	2	.857	23	–	7	.767
Yale †	11	–	3	.786	19	–	12	.613
Penn	9	–	5	.643	12	–	16	.429
Cornell	7	–	7	.500	15	–	11	.577
Dartmouth	6	–	8	.429	9	–	16	.360
Harvard	5	–	9	.357	13	–	13	.500
Brown	5	–	9	.357	13	–	16	.448
Columbia	1	–	13	.071	4	–	22	.154
† 2022 Ivy League Tournament winner

The 2021–22 Yale Bulldogs men's basketball team represented Yale University in the 2021–22 NCAA Division I men's basketball season. The Bulldogs, led by 22nd-year head coach James Jones, played their home games at John J. Lee Amphitheater of the Payne Whitney Gymnasium in New Haven, Connecticut, as members of the Ivy League. They finished the season 19–12, 11–3 in Ivy League play to finish in second place. As the No. 2 seed, they defeated Penn and Princeton to win the Ivy League tournament. They received the conference’s automatic bid to the NCAA tournament as the No. 14 seed in the East Region, where they lost in the first round to Purdue.

== Previous seasons ==
Due to the COVID-19 pandemic, the Ivy League chose not to conduct a season in 2020–21. The 2019–20 Bulldogs' team went 23–8 and won the Ivy League regular season title. The Ivy League tournament was canceled on March 10 and Yale was awarded the league's automatic bid to the NCAA tournament, which was canceled on March 11.

== Roster ==
2021–22 Yale Bulldogs men's basketball team
Players
Coaches

Pos.	#	Name	Height	Weight	Year	Hometown
G	0	Jalen Gabbidon	6 ft 5 in (1.96 m)	190 lb (86 kg)	Sr	Harrisburg, Pennsylvania
G	1	Eze Dike	6 ft 2 in (1.88 m)	195 lb (88 kg)	Sr	Montreal, Quebec
G	2	Bez Mbeng	6 ft 4 in (1.93 m)	195 lb (88 kg)	Fr	Potomac, Maryland
G	3	August Mahoney	6 ft 4 in (1.93 m)	190 lb (86 kg)	So	Saratoga Springs, New York
G	4	John Poulakidas	6 ft 5 in (1.96 m)	190 lb (86 kg)	Fr	Naperville, Illinois
G	5	Azar Swain	6 ft 1 in (1.85 m)	185 lb (84 kg)	Sr	Brockton, Massachusetts
G	10	Matthue Cotton	6 ft 5 in (1.96 m)	200 lb (91 kg)	Jr	Voorhees, New Jersey
G	11	Emir Buyukhanli	6 ft 5 in (1.96 m)	210 lb (95 kg)	Fr	Ankara, Turkey
G	12	Teo Rice	6 ft 2 in (1.88 m)	190 lb (86 kg)	Fr	Bethesda, Maryland
G	13	Michael Feinberg	6 ft 4 in (1.93 m)	195 lb (88 kg)	Jr	Hidden Hills, California
F	14	Jameel Alausa	6 ft 7 in (2.01 m)	210 lb (95 kg)	Sr	Chicago, Illinois
F	15	EJ Jarvis	6 ft 8 in (2.03 m)	220 lb (100 kg)	Jr	Washington, D.C.
F	20	Jack Molloy	6 ft 8 in (2.03 m)	225 lb (102 kg)	Fr	Greenwich, Connecticut
F	21	Luke Kolaja	6 ft 8 in (2.03 m)	225 lb (102 kg)	Fr	Montclair, New Jersey
F	22	Matt Knowling	6 ft 5 in (1.96 m)	195 lb (88 kg)	So	Ellington, Connecticut
F	23	Yussif Basa-Ama	6 ft 8 in (2.03 m)	200 lb (91 kg)	So	Bolgatanga, Ghana
G	24	Yassine Gharram	6 ft 3 in (1.91 m)	185 lb (84 kg)	Fr	San Diego, California
F	30	Jake Lanford	6 ft 10 in (2.08 m)	230 lb (104 kg)	Jr	Charleston, South Carolina
F	35	Isaiah Kelly	6 ft 7 in (2.01 m)	215 lb (98 kg)	Jr	Augusta, Georgia

Head coach

- James Jones (Albany)

Assistant coach(es)

- Matt Kingsley (Wesleyan)
- Justin Simon (Yale)
- Alington Paul (SUNY Delhi)

Legend

- (C) Team captain
- (S) Suspended
- (I) Ineligible
- (W) Walk-on
- Injured
- Current redshirt

Roster
Last update: December 22, 2021

== Schedule and results ==
Date time, TV	Rank^{#}	Opponent^{#}	Result	Record	Site (attendance) city, state
Non-conference regular season
November 9, 2021*; 7:00 pm, ESPN+		Vassar	W 88–42	1–0	John J. Lee Amphitheater (1,468); New Haven, CT
November 12, 2021*; 8:00 pm, ESPN+		UMass	W 91–71	2–0	John J. Lee Amphitheater (1,590); New Haven, CT
November 14, 2021*; 12:00 pm, FS1		at Seton Hall; Fort Myers Tip-Off campus-site game	L 44–80	2–1	Prudential Center (8,265); Newark, NJ
November 16, 2021*; 7:00 pm, ESPN3		at Siena	W 82–54	3–1	Times Union Center (4,729); Albany, NY
November 19, 2021*; 4:00 pm, ESPN3		at Vermont	L 53–61	3–2	Patrick Gym (2,188); Burlington, VT
November 23, 2021*; 12:00 pm		vs. Southern Utah; Fort Myers Tip-Off Palms semifinals	L 85–88 ^{OT}	3–3	Suncoast Credit Union Arena (573); Ft. Myers, FL
November 24, 2021*; 11:00 am		vs. Milwaukee; Fort Myers Tip-Off Palms consolation game	W 69–56	4–3	Suncoast Credit Union Arena (333); Ft. Myers, FL
November 28, 2021*; 1:00 pm, NESN/ESPN+		Stony Brook	L 81–85	4–4	John J. Lee Amphitheater (568); New Haven, CT
December 1, 2021*; 7:00 pm, ESPN+		Lehigh	W 82–72	5–4	John J. Lee Amphitheater (636); New Haven, CT
December 4, 2021*; 2:00 pm, ESPNU		at No. 21 Auburn	L 64–86	5–5	Auburn Arena (9,121); Auburn, AL
December 7, 2021*; 7:00 pm, ESPN+		Albany	W 71–52	6–5	John J. Lee Amphitheater (777); New Haven, CT
December 12, 2021*; 7:00 pm, FloSports.TV		vs. Iona; Basketball Hall of Fame Invitational	L 77–91	6–6	Barclays Center (7,124); Brooklyn, NY
December 14, 2021*; 7:00 pm, ESPN+		Monmouth	L 60–69	6–7	John J. Lee Amphitheater (892); New Haven, CT
December 23, 2021*; 2:00 pm, ESPN+		Howard	Canceled due to COVID-19 issues at Howard		John J. Lee Amphitheater; New Haven, CT
December 28, 2021*; 10:00 pm		at Saint Mary's	L 60–87	6–8	University Credit Union Pavilion (2,904); Moraga, CA
Ivy League regular season
January 2, 2021; 12:00 pm, NESN+/ESPN+		Columbia	Postponed due to COVID-19 issues		John J. Lee Amphitheater; New Haven, CT
January 7, 2022; 7:00 pm, ESPN+		at Dartmouth	Postponed due to COVID-19 issues		Leede Arena; Hanover, NH
January 9, 2022; 2:00 pm, ESPNU		at Harvard	Postponed due to COVID-19 issues		Lavietes Pavilion; Boston, MA
January 15, 2022; 2:00 pm, ESPN+		Cornell	W 96–69	7–8 (1–0)	John J. Lee Amphitheater; New Haven, CT
January 17, 2022; 5:00 pm, NESN/ESPN+		at Brown	W 66–63	8–8 (2–0)	Pizzitola Sports Center (525); Providence, RI
January 22, 2022; 5:00 pm, ESPN+		at Penn	L 68–76	8–9 (2–1)	The Palestra (125); Philadelphia, PA
January 25, 2022; 7:00 pm, ESPN+		Columbia; Rescheduled from January 2	W 83–72	9–9 (3–1)	John J. Lee Amphitheater (0); New Haven, CT
January 29, 2022; 4:00 pm, ESPN+		at Princeton	W 80–74	10–9 (4–1)	Jadwin Gymnasium (241); Princeton, NJ
February 4, 2022; 7:00 pm, ESPNU		Dartmouth	W 72–69	11–9 (5–1)	John J. Lee Amphitheater (125); New Haven, CT
February 5, 2022; 7:00 pm, ESPN+		Harvard	W 58–55	12–9 (6–1)	John J. Lee Amphitheater (1,104); New Haven, CT
February 9, 2022; 7:00 pm, ESPN+		Harvard; Rescheduled from January 9	W 62–59	13–9 (7–1)	Lavietes Pavilion (1,325); Boston, MA
February 12, 2022; 2:00 pm, ESPN+		at Columbia	W 84–59	14–9 (8–1)	Levien Gymnasium (977); New York, NY
February 18, 2022; 7:00 pm, ESPN+		Penn	W 81–72	15–9 (9–1)	John J. Lee Amphitheater; New Haven, CT
February 19, 2022; 7:00 pm, ESPN+		Princeton	L 75–81	15–10 (9–2)	John J. Lee Amphitheater (1,268); New Haven, CT
February 22, 2022; 6:00 pm, ESPN+		Dartmouth; Rescheduled from January 7	W 66–61	16–10 (10–2)	Leede Arena (473); Hanover, NH
February 26, 2022; 6:00 pm, ESPN+		at Cornell	L 65–71	16–11 (10–3)	Newman Arena (0); Ithaca, NY
March 5, 2022; 7:00 pm, ESPN+		Brown	W 74–65	17–11 (11–3)	John J. Lee Amphitheater (1,203); New Haven, CT
Ivy League tournament
March 12, 2022; 2:00 pm, ESPNU	(2)	vs. (3) Penn; Semifinals	W 67–61	18–11	Lavietes Pavilion; Boston, MA
March 13, 2022; 12:00 pm, ESPN2	(2)	vs. (1) Princeton; Championship	W 66–64	19–11	Lavietes Pavilion; Boston, MA
NCAA tournament
March 18, 2022; 2:00 p.m., TBS	(14 E)	vs. (3 E) No. 10 Purdue; First Round	L 56–78	19–12	Fiserv Forum (17,500); Milwaukee, WI
*Non-conference game. ^{#}Rankings from AP Poll. (#) Tournament seedings in parentheses. All times are in Eastern.
