= Eric Saint =

English Australian physician and professor of medicine

Eric Galton Saint (28 November 1918 – 21 February 1989) was an English Australian physician and professor of medicine. Saint tried to forewarn authorities of the Wittenoom Industrial Disaster. With a continuously rising death toll now believed to be in excess of 2000 people, the Wittenoom Industrial Disaster is widely considered to be Australia's largest industrial tragedy.

== Education ==
Born in Newcastle upon Tyne, Saint attended Royal Grammar School. After winning a scholarship in 1936, Saint attended King's College at Durham University where he graduated with science and medicine degrees, including a Bachelor of Science in 1939 and Bachelor of Medicine, Bachelor of Surgery in 1942. After Saint served as a medical officer in the Royal Air Force from 1942 until 1946, he returned to the University of Durham to complete a Doctor of Medicine.

== Career ==
Saint relocated to Australia in 1948 to become a district medical officer in North West Western Australia based in Port Hedland, working with the Royal Flying Doctor Service.

This work took Saint into the small communities within the Pilbara including the blue asbestos mining community of Wittenoom.

After visiting the Australian Blue Asbestos mine at Wittenoom in 1948 and being "appalled" at the dusty conditions, Saint wrote a letter to the commissioner of the Public Health Department of Western Australia, Dr Cecil Cook, warning of the serious health risk to the workers, including the likelihood they would develop asbestosis.

The most notable excerpt from Saint's 1948 letter is perhaps: "The asbestos mine at Wittenoom, let the record state, operates without any sort of dust extractor whatsoever. In a year or two, ABA will produce the richest and most lethal crop of asbestosis cases in the world's literature".

In a Four Corners interview, Saint said he also spoke directly with mine management to express his concerns in "no uncertain terms" about what he believed to be an extremely hazardous occupational situation for the miners. Saint said that although they listened politely, they didn't commit themselves to addressing the issue.

Despite advising what the likely consequences would be to the workers of the mine, Saint's warnings were ignored.

The mine continued to operate until 1966 when it was closed for economical reasons. About a decade after the mine's closure, it soon became apparent that many former residents of Wittenoom were succumbing to asbestos-related diseases including asbestosis and mesothelioma. This included employees who had worked in the mine, their partners who had washed their dusty work clothes and their children who had played in the asbestos tailings which were scattered throughout the town.

Asked if he believed there were people who should be blamed for the emerging disaster, Saint said proportioning blame was for the courts to decide, but added that he felt sad that no action was taken at the time by people in positions of responsibility.

After successfully obtaining membership into the Royal Australasian College of Physicians in 1950, Saint joined the staff of the Walter and Eliza Hall Institute of Medical Research in Melbourne in February 1951. While at the institute, Saint focused on gastroenterology and published papers on chronic alcoholism.

In December 1952, Saint was appointed the director of the new clinical research unit at the Royal Perth Hospital. He was also credited with being instrumental in establishing a medical school at the University of Western Australia in 1956, and was one of its nine foundation professors. Saint also served as the president of the Western Australian Council of Social Service from 1958 to 1968.

Saint relocated to Queensland in 1968, where he commenced the role of full-time dean of the University of Queensland's Faculty of Medicine. During this time, Saint helped with the expansion of the National Health and Medical Research Council. He was also a founding member on the Parliamentary Committee on Overseas Professional Qualifications, which developed exams for overseas-trained doctors. While in Queensland, Saint briefly served as the president of the Queensland Council of Social Service from 1969 to 1970.

Saint once again returned to Western Australia in 1978 to take up two part-time clinical positions, working in aged care at Sir Charles Gairdner Hospital while also working for the Western Australian Alcohol and Drug Authority.

In 1988, Saint was a key witness in the landmark Tim Barrows and Peter Heys Vs CSR Ltd trial in the Supreme Court of Western Australia. It was the state's longest running civil court case. Saint's letters and attempt at warning of the dangers of asbestos in 1948 were considered pivotal to the ultimate judgement against CSR Limited.

== Honours ==
In 1956, Saint was elected as a Fellow of the Royal Australasian College of Physicians and in 1972, Saint was named as a Fellow of the Royal College of Physicians.

Saint was awarded an honorary degree at the University of Queensland in 1978 and with an honorary degree at the University of Western Australia in 1981.

In 1986, he was awarded the Royal Australasian College of Physicians Medal.

In the 1981 Queen's Birthday Honours, Saint was awarded with a Companion of the Order of St Michael and St George for his service to medicine and the community.

== Death ==
Saint died from coronary artery disease on 21 February 1989 in the western Perth suburb of Nedlands.
