= Simon Johnson (cricketer) =

English cricketer (born 1970)

Personal information
- Full name: Simon Wolseley Johnson
- Born: 29 January 1970 (age 56); Newcastle, Northumberland, England
- Batting: Right-handed
- Bowling: Right-arm medium-fast

Domestic team information
- Years: Team
- 1990–1992: Cambridge University

Career statistics
| Competition | First-class |
|---|---|
| Matches | 22 |
| Runs scored | 321 |
| Batting average | 17.83 |
| 100s/50s | –/1 |
| Top score | 50 |
| Balls bowled | 2,449 |
| Wickets | 16 |
| Bowling average | 100.06 |
| 5 wickets in innings | – |
| 10 wickets in match | – |
| Best bowling | 3/62 |
| Catches/stumpings | 9/– |
- Source: Cricinfo, 12 January 2022

Simon Wolseley Johnson (born 29 January 1970) is an English former first-class cricketer.

Johnson was born at Newcastle in January 1970. He was educated there at the Royal Grammar School, before going up to Magdalene College, Cambridge. While studying at Cambridge, he played first-class cricket for Cambridge University Cricket Club between 1990 and 1992, making 22 appearances. Playing as an all-rounder in the Cambridge side, he scored 321 runs at an average of 17.83, making one half century score of exactly 50. With his medium-fast bowling, he took 16 wickets at an expensive bowling average of just over 100. His best bowling figures were 3 for 62.

Johnson was also a keen rugby player and was capped for Northumberland between 1992-93 whilst playing for Novocastrians.
