= Richard Austin Bastow =

Richard Austin Bastow (14 May 1839 – 14 May 1920) was an Australian naturalist and bryologist.

R.A. Bastow was born in Edinburgh, Scotland, the son of a scholarly parson James Austin Bastow. He was educated at The Royal Grammar School. In 1862 he eloped with Catherine Broadbent to the United States. Austin Bastow, his son, was born in Cleveland, Ohio in 1867. Bastow and his wife returned to England because of her mother's delicate health. After her death, they decided to emigrate to Tasmania, Australia, where in 1884 he became Town Surveyor in Hobart. He had 5 children, 2 dying young, the other three were a son, Austin and 2 daughters, Dorothea Kate and Daisy Winifred. Richard and Catherine were buried in the Booroondara General Cemetery, Melbourne, Australia

In Tasmania, Bastow became interested in bryology. His definitive work, Mosses of Tasmania, was published in Hobart in 1886. Other significant works followed over the years. His last paper was Victorian Hepaticae in 1914, the pioneer paper in the field for that Australian state

In 1888 Bastow moved to Victoria, arriving aboard the Mangana on 13 March. In Victoria he initially worked privately but later became an employee of the Public Works Department until his retirement. Bastow found self-employment a task he was not suited to and being employed allowed him the time he felt he needed to follow his true passion "seaweeds and mosses". He was largely responsible for the original Melbourne Fish Market. In Victoria he continued with his field work and enthusiastic presentation of papers at the Field Naturalists Club and Royal Society of Victoria. He was a Fellow of the Linnean Society of London between 1885 and 1889

After his death, his son Austin donated to the National Museum of Melbourne his collection of more than 10,000 molluscs. His main collection is in the Melbourne Herbarium. Other collections are in the Museum of Victoria, and bryological specimens are at the National Herbarium of Victoria (MEL), Royal Botanic Gardens Victoria.

The following species are named after Bastow:

Cyclostrema bastowi
Orbitestella bastowi
Daphnella bastowi
Asperdaphne bastowi
