= 2021–22 Brown Bears men's basketball team =

American college basketball season

2021–22 Brown Bears men's basketball
- Conference: Ivy League
- Record: 13–16 (5–9 Ivy)
- Head coach: Mike Martin (9th (Note: According to the Brown Athletics website, Martin, Sorrentine, Gray, and Handelsman are, respectively, entering their 10th, 14th, 4th, and 3rd seasons at Brown in 2021–22. However, this is only true if you count the 2020–21 season, which Brown did not participate in due to the Ivy League canceling all sports. Therefore, while Martin is technically in his 10th year as Brown head coach, 2021–22 is his 9th actual season; the same rule applies for the assistants as well.) season)
- Associate head coach: T. J. Sorrentine (10th season as AHC; 13th overall season)
- Assistant coaches: Antone Gray (3rd season); Cooper Handelsman (2nd season)
- Home arena: Pizzitola Sports Center (Capacity: 2,800)

2021–22 Ivy League men's basketball standings
	Conf.				Overall
Team	W		L	PCT	W		L	PCT
Princeton	12	–	2	.857	23	–	7	.767
Yale †	11	–	3	.786	19	–	12	.613
Penn	9	–	5	.643	12	–	16	.429
Cornell	7	–	7	.500	15	–	11	.577
Dartmouth	6	–	8	.429	9	–	16	.360
Harvard	5	–	9	.357	13	–	13	.500
Brown	5	–	9	.357	13	–	16	.448
Columbia	1	–	13	.071	4	–	22	.154
† 2022 Ivy League Tournament winner

The 2021–22 Brown Bears men's basketball team represented Brown University in the 2021–22 NCAA Division I men's basketball season. The Bears, led by ninth-year head coach Mike Martin, played their home games at the Paul Bailey Pizzitola Memorial Sports Center in Providence, Rhode Island, and competed as members of the Ivy League.

== Previous season ==
Due to the COVID-19 pandemic, the Ivy League chose not to conduct a season in 2020–21. Therefore, the most recent season in which Brown fielded a men's basketball team was 2019–20, a year during which they finished 15–12, including an 8–6 record in Ivy League play.

The 2019–20 Bears finished fifth in the Ivy League's regular-season standings, meaning they did not qualify for the Ivy League tournament (which was eventually canceled regardless).

== Roster ==
2021–22 Brown Bears men's basketball team
Players
Coaches

Pos.	#	Name	Height	Weight	Year	Previous school	Hometown
G	0	David Mitchell	6 ft 6 in (1.98 m)	210 lb (95 kg)	Sr	Belmont Hill School	Roxbury, MA
G	1	Dan Friday	6 ft 4 in (1.93 m)	225 lb (102 kg)	So	Univ. of Detroit Jesuit HS	Detroit, MI
G	2	Zachary Taylor	6 ft 2 in (1.88 m)	185 lb (84 kg)	So	Northfield Mt. Hermon	Austin, TX
G	4	Lyndel Erold	6 ft 3 in (1.91 m)	170 lb (77 kg)	Fr	St. Sebastian's School	Boston, MA
G	5	Noah Meren	6 ft 5 in (1.96 m)	200 lb (91 kg)	Sr	Moses Brown School	Providence, RI
G	10	Kino Lilly Jr.	6 ft 0 in (1.83 m)	165 lb (75 kg)	Fr	Landon School	Glenn Dale, MD
F	11	Malachi Ndur	6 ft 8 in (2.03 m)	215 lb (98 kg)	So	Cushing Academy	St. Thomas, ON, Canada
G/F	13	Josh Watts	6 ft 4 in (1.93 m)	190 lb (86 kg)	Jr	Gonzaga College HS	Beltsville, MD
G	14	Tyler Brown	6 ft 0 in (1.83 m)	175 lb (79 kg)	Sr	Derby HS	Wichita, KS
G	20	Kimo Ferrari	6 ft 0 in (1.83 m)	185 lb (84 kg)	So	Francis Parker	San Diego, CA
G/F	21	Aaron Cooley	6 ft 5 in (1.96 m)	185 lb (84 kg)	Fr	Newton North HS	Roxbury, MA
F	22	Jaylan Gainey	6 ft 9 in (2.06 m)	220 lb (100 kg)	Sr	The Academy at Smith	Greensboro, NC
G	23	Perry Cowan	6 ft 4 in (1.93 m)	205 lb (93 kg)	Jr	DePaul College Prep	Chicago, IL
G	24	Felix Kloman	6 ft 5 in (1.96 m)	190 lb (86 kg)	So	Pingree School	Ipswich, MA
F	25	Tamenong Choh	6 ft 5 in (1.96 m)	210 lb (95 kg)	GS	Brooks School	Lowell, MA
F	31	Nana Owusu-Anane	6 ft 8 in (2.03 m)	220 lb (100 kg)	Fr	Putnam Science Academy	Burlington, ON, Canada
G	32	Paxson Wojcik	6 ft 5 in (1.96 m)	200 lb (91 kg)	Jr	La Lumiere School	Charleston, SC
G	55	Sam Klores	6 ft 1 in (1.85 m)	180 lb (82 kg)	Fr	Riverdale Country School	New York, NY

Head coach

- Mike Martin (Brown)

Assistant coach(es)

- T. J. Sorrentine (Vermont)
- Antone Gray (Rhode Island College)
- Cooper Handelsman (Kenyon)

Legend

- (C) Team captain
- (S) Suspended
- (I) Ineligible
- (W) Walk-on
- Injured
- Current redshirt

Roster
Last update: December 15, 2021

== Schedule and results ==
Date time, TV	Rank^{#}	Opponent^{#}	Result	Record	High points	High rebounds	High assists	Site (attendance) city, state
Non-conference regular season
November 9, 2021*; 7:00 p.m., ESPN+		Salve Regina	W 89–59	1–0	13 – Mitchell	7 – Gainey	6 – Lilly Jr.	Pizzitola Sports Center (765); Providence, RI
November 12, 2021*; 9:00 p.m., ACCN		at No. 19 North Carolina	L 87–94	1–1	21 – Friday	8 – Owusu-Anane	5 – Friday	Dean Smith Center (16,854); Chapel Hill, NC
November 14, 2021*; 4:00 p.m., ESPN+		Central Connecticut	W 75–57	2–1	22 – Lilly Jr.	8 – Gainey	4 – Ferrari	Pizzitola Sports Center (315); Providence, RI
November 16, 2021*; 7:00 p.m., ESPN+		Johnson & Wales (RI)	W 98–47	3–1	19 – Gainey	8 – Ndur	6 – Friday	Pizzitola Sports Center (556); Providence, RI
November 19, 2021*; 3:15 p.m., ESPN3		vs. Creighton; Paradise Jam quarterfinals	L 57–78	3–2	12 – Lilly Jr.	4 – Tied	2 – Lilly Jr.	UVI Sports & Fitness Center (622); St. Thomas, USVI
November 20, 2021*; 3:15 p.m., ESPN3		vs. Bradley; Paradise Jam consolation 2nd round	W 65–62	4–2	11 – Tied	8 – Tied	3 – Choh	UVI Sports & Fitness Center; St. Thomas, USVI
November 22, 2021*; 3:15 p.m., ESPN3		vs. Colorado; Paradise Jam 5th place game	L 52–54	4–3	14 – Wojcik	6 – Tied	3 – Choh	UVI Sports & Fitness Center (655); St. Thomas, USVI
November 26, 2021*; 2:00 p.m., NESN/ESPN+		Bryant; Ocean State Cup	L 59–65	4–4	17 – Friday	21 – Choh	2 – Choh	Pizzitola Sports Center (874); Providence, RI
November 28, 2021*; 4:00 p.m., ESPN3		at Quinnipiac	W 72–61	5–4	24 – Lilly Jr.	10 – Tied	5 – Friday	People's United Center (533); Hamden, CT
December 1, 2021*; 7:00 p.m., ESPN+		at UMass Lowell	W 73–63	6–4	26 – Choh	7 – Choh	4 – Wojcik	Costello Athletic Center (900); Lowell, MA
December 5, 2021*; 2:00 p.m., ESPN+		Sacred Heart	W 79–66	7–4	17 – Wojcik	6 – Tied	5 – Ferrari	Pizzitola Sports Center (415); Providence, RI
December 7, 2021*; 7:00 p.m., NEC Front Row		at Merrimack	W 76–56	8–4	17 – Gainey	9 – Choh	4 – Choh	Hammel Court (637); North Andover, MA
December 10, 2021*; 7:00 p.m., ESPN+		Vermont	L 65–70	8–5	13 – Tied	7 – Choh	6 – Lilly Jr.	Pizzitola Sports Center (1,226); Providence, RI
December 22, 2021*; 7:00 p.m., ESPN+		at Rhode Island; Ocean State Cup	Canceled due to COVID-19 issues					Ryan Center; Kingston, RI
December 27, 2021*; 8:00 p.m., ESPN+		at Syracuse	L 62–93	8–6	13 – Lilly Jr.	7 – Choh	5 – Friday	Carrier Dome (15,526); Syracuse, NY
December 30, 2021*; 7:00 p.m., BTN		at Maryland	L 67–81	8–7	25 – Choh	9 – Wojcik	3 – Tied	Xfinity Center (10,224); College Park, MD
Ivy League regular season
January 2, 2022; 3:00 p.m., ESPN+		at Penn	L 73–77	8–8 (0–1)	26 – Choh	13 – Choh	3 – Lilly Jr.	The Palestra (125); Philadelphia, PA
January 7, 2022; 7:00 p.m., ESPN+		at Harvard	W 84–73	9–8 (1–1)	23 – Lilly Jr.	9 – Choh	4 – Choh	Lavietes Pavilion (250); Cambridge, MA
January 8, 2022; 7:00 p.m., ESPN+		at Dartmouth	L 46–58	9–9 (1–2)	23 – Choh	12 – Choh	1 – Tied	Leede Arena (109); Hanover, NH
January 15, 2022; 4:00 p.m., ESPN+		at Princeton	L 74–76	9–10 (1–3)	25 – Lilly Jr.	4 – Tied	7 – Choh	Jadwin Gymnasium (56); Princeton, NJ
January 17, 2022; 5:00 p.m., NESN/ESPN+		Yale	L 63–66	9–11 (1–4)	30 – Choh	12 – Choh	3 – Tied	Pizzitola Sports Center (525); Providence, RI
January 22, 2022; 2:00 p.m., ESPN+		at Columbia	W 93–74	10–11 (2–4)	20 – Choh	8 – Tied	3 – Tied	Levien Gymnasium (140); New York, NY
January 30, 2022; 4:00 p.m., ESPN+/NESN+		Cornell	L 72–74	10–12 (2–5)	23 – Lilly Jr.	9 – Gainey	3 – Wojcik	Pizzitola Sports Center (225); Providence, RI
February 4, 2022; 7:00 p.m., ESPN+		Harvard	L 50–65	10–13 (2–6)	14 – Lilly Jr.	13 – Gainey	6 – Choh	Pizzitola Sports Center (651); Providence, RI
February 5, 2022; 6:00 p.m., ESPN+		Dartmouth	W 62–60	11–13 (3–6)	14 – Lilly Jr.	13 – Gainey	6 – Choh	Pizzitola Sports Center (575); Providence, RI
February 12, 2022; 2:00 p.m., ESPN+		at Cornell	W 81–80	12–13 (4–6)	16 – Gainey	15 – Choh	4 – Ferrari	Newman Arena (0); Ithaca, NY
February 18, 2022; 7:00 p.m., ESPN+		Princeton	L 50–69	12–14 (4–7)	18 – Choh	10 – Choh	2 – Tied	Pizzitola Sports Center (475); Providence, RI
February 19, 2022; 6:00 p.m., ESPN+		Penn	L 88–89	12–15 (4–8)	20 – Lilly Jr.	9 – Choh	9 – Choh	Pizzitola Sports Center (710); Providence, RI
February 26, 2022; 6:00 p.m., ESPN+		Columbia	W 81–74	13–15 (5–8)	25 – Gainey	12 – Gainey	7 – Choh	Pizzitola Sports Center (715); Providence, RI
March 5, 2022; 7:00 p.m., ESPN+		at Yale	L 65–74	13–16 (5–9)	20 – Gainey	18 – Gainey	4 – Lilly Jr.	John J. Lee Amphitheater (1,203); New Haven, CT
*Non-conference game. ^{#}Rankings from AP Poll. (#) Tournament seedings in parentheses. All times are in Eastern.
