= 2021–22 Harvard Crimson men's basketball team =

American college basketball season

2021–22 Harvard Crimson men's basketball
- Conference: Ivy League
- Record: 13–13 (5–9 Ivy)
- Head coach: Tommy Amaker (14th season)
- Assistant coaches: Brian Eskildsen; Donny Guerinoni; Michael Sotsky
- Home arena: Lavietes Pavilion

2021–22 Ivy League men's basketball standings
	Conf.				Overall
Team	W		L	PCT	W		L	PCT
Princeton	12	–	2	.857	23	–	7	.767
Yale †	11	–	3	.786	19	–	12	.613
Penn	9	–	5	.643	12	–	16	.429
Cornell	7	–	7	.500	15	–	11	.577
Dartmouth	6	–	8	.429	9	–	16	.360
Harvard	5	–	9	.357	13	–	13	.500
Brown	5	–	9	.357	13	–	16	.448
Columbia	1	–	13	.071	4	–	22	.154
† 2022 Ivy League Tournament winner

The 2021–22 Harvard Crimson men's basketball team represented Harvard University in the 2021–22 NCAA Division I men's basketball season. The Crimson, led by 14th-year head coach Tommy Amaker, played their home games at the Lavietes Pavilion in Boston, Massachusetts as members of the Ivy League.

== Previous seasons ==
Due to the COVID-19 pandemic, the Ivy League chose not to conduct a season in 2020–21.

The Crimson finished the 2019–20 season 21–8 overall, 10–4 in Ivy League play, finishing second in the regular season standings. The team qualified for the Ivy League tournament, but due to COVID-19 concerns the Tournament was canceled on March 10.

== Roster ==
2021–22 Harvard Crimson men's basketball team
Players
Coaches

Pos.	#	Name	Height	Weight	Year	Hometown
G	0	Tyler Simon	6 ft 5 in (1.96 m)	187 lb (85 kg)	Fr	Houston, Texas
F	1	Luka Sakota	6 ft 9 in (2.06 m)	230 lb (104 kg)	So	Toronto, Ontario
G	2	Luka Sakota	6 ft 5 in (1.96 m)	195 lb (88 kg)	Jr	Etobicoke, Ontario
G	3	Idan Tretout	6 ft 4 in (1.93 m)	200 lb (91 kg)	Jr	Brooklyn, New York
F	4	Chris Ledlum	6 ft 6 in (1.98 m)	225 lb (102 kg)	Jr	Brooklyn, New York
G	10	Noah Kirkwood	6 ft 7 in (2.01 m)	215 lb (98 kg)	Sr	Ottawa, Ontario
G	11	Evan Nelson	6 ft 2 in (1.88 m)	170 lb (77 kg)	Fr	Tucson, Arizona
G	12	Spencer Freedman	6 ft 0 in (1.83 m)	170 lb (77 kg)	Sr	Pacific Palisades, California
G	20	Sam Silverstein	6 ft 6 in (1.98 m)	195 lb (88 kg)	So	Glencoe, Illinois
F	21	Mason Forbes	6 ft 9 in (2.06 m)	230 lb (104 kg)	Sr	Folsom, California
F	22	Justice Ajogbor	6 ft 10 in (2.08 m)	255 lb (116 kg)	So	Benin City, Nigeria
G	23	Louis Lesmond	6 ft 6 in (1.98 m)	190 lb (86 kg)	Fr	Paris, France
F	24	Kale Catchings	6 ft 6 in (1.98 m)	220 lb (100 kg)	Sr	O'Fallon, Missouri
F	25	Ciaran Brayboy	6 ft 9 in (2.06 m)	230 lb (104 kg)	Fr	Glencoe, Illinois
F	32	Tommy O'Neil	6 ft 8 in (2.03 m)	210 lb (95 kg)	Jr	Lexington, Massachusetts
F	42	Bennett Pitcher	6 ft 9 in (2.06 m)	285 lb (129 kg)	Fr	Deerfield, Massachusetts
G	55	Denham Wojcik	6 ft 2 in (1.88 m)	178 lb (81 kg)	Fr	Charleston, South Carolina

Head coach

- Tommy Amaker (Duke)

Assistant coach(es)

- Brian Eskildsen (Tennessee)
- Donny Guerinoni (Nevada)
- Michael Sotsky (Harvard)

Legend

- (C) Team captain
- (S) Suspended
- (I) Ineligible
- (W) Walk-on
- Injured
- Current redshirt

Roster
Last update: December 23, 2021

== Schedule and results ==
Date time, TV	Rank^{#}	Opponent^{#}	Result	Record	Site (attendance) city, state
Non-conference regular season
November 9, 2021*; 7:00 pm, ESPN+		Morehouse	W 86–70	1–0	Lavietes Pavilion (1,282); Boston, MA
November 13, 2021*; 1:00 pm, ESPN3		at Iona	L 87–90 ^{OT}	1–1	Hynes Athletic Center (2,259); New Rochelle, NY
November 17, 2021*; 7:00 pm, ESPN+		at Albany	W 60–53	2–1	SEFCU Arena (2,684); Albany, NY
November 20, 2021*; 2:00 pm, ESPN+		MIT	W 98–52	3–1	Lavietes Pavilion (1,047); Boston, MA
November 22, 2021*; 7:00 pm, ESPN3		at Siena	L 69–72	3–2	Times Union Center (4,673); Albany, NY
November 24, 2021*; 7:00 pm, ESPN+		Colgate	W 89–84 ^{OT}	4–2	Lavietes Pavilion (1,061); Boston, MA
November 27, 2021*; 5:00 pm, NESN/ESPN+		Northeastern	W 77–57	5–2	Lavietes Pavilion (1,183); Boston, MA
December 1, 2021*; 7:00 pm, ESPN+		Rhode Island	L 57–64	5–3	Lavietes Pavilion (1,038); Boston, MA
December 4, 2021*; 12:00 pm, NESN/ESPN+		at UMass	L 77–87	5–4	Mullins Center (2,333); Amherst, MA
December 6, 2021*; 7:00 pm, ESPN+		Babson	W 74–64	6–4	Lavietes Pavilion (1,577); Boston, MA
December 19, 2021*; 2:00 pm, ESPN+		Holy Cross	W 62–54	7–4	Lavietes Pavilion (1,092); Boston, MA
December 21, 2021*; 7:00 pm, ESPN+		Howard	W 77–69	8–4	Lavietes Pavilion (1,006); Boston, MA
December 29, 2021*; 8:00 pm, Big 12 Now		at No. 6 Kansas	Canceled due to COVID-19 issues with Harvard.		Allen Fieldhouse; Lawrence, KS
Ivy League regular season
January 7, 2022; 7:00 pm, ESPN+		Brown	L 73–84	8–5 (0–1)	Lavietes Pavilion (250); Boston, MA
January 15, 2022; 2:00 pm, ESPN+		at Columbia	W 91–82	9–5 (1–1)	Levien Gymnasium; New York, NY
January 17, 2022; 7:00 pm, ESPN+		at Dartmouth	W 60–59	10–5 (2–1)	Leede Arena (88); Hanover, NH
January 22, 2022; 2:00 pm, ESPN+		at Cornell	L 61–76	10–6 (2–2)	Newman Arena (877); Ithaca, NY
January 28, 2022; 5:00 pm, ESPNU		Penn	L 74–78	10–7 (2–3)	Lavietes Pavilion (1,636); Boston, MA
February 4, 2022; 7:00 pm, ESPN+		at Brown	W 65–50	11–7 (3–3)	Pizzitola Sports Center (651); Providence, RI
February 5, 2022; 7:00 pm, ESPN+		at Yale	L 55–58	11–8 (3–4)	John J. Lee Amphitheater (1,104); New Haven, CT
February 9, 2022; 7:00 pm, ESPN+		Yale; Rescheduled from January 9	L 59–62	11–9 (3–5)	Lavietes Pavilion (1,325); Boston, MA
February 12, 2022; 2:00 pm, ESPN+		at Penn	L 74–82	11–10 (3–6)	The Palestra (2,776); Philadelphia, PA
February 18, 2022; 7:00 pm, ESPN+		Columbia	W 62–54	12–10 (4–6)	Lavietes Pavilion (1,118); Boston, MA
February 19, 2022; 7:00 pm, ESPN+		Cornell	W 77–72 ^{OT}	13–10 (5–6)	Lavietes Pavilion (1,112); Boston, MA
February 25, 2022; 7:00 pm, ESPNews		at Princeton	L 67–74	13–11 (5–7)	Jadwin Gymnasium; Princeton, NJ
February 27, 2022; 12:00 pm, ESPN+		Princeton; Rescheduled from January 2	L 73–74	13–12 (5–8)	Lavietes Pavilion (1,177); Boston, MA
March 5, 2022; 2:00 pm, ESPN+		Dartmouth	L 54–76	13–13 (5–9)	Lavietes Pavilion (1,376); Boston, MA
*Non-conference game. ^{#}Rankings from AP Poll. (#) Tournament seedings in parentheses. All times are in Eastern.
