= Matt Thompson (rugby union) =

English rugby union player

- Born: Matthew Thompson; 12 December 1982 (age 43) Brighton, England
- Height: 1.88 m (6 ft 2 in)
- Weight: 120 kg (18 st 13 lb)
- School: Royal Grammar School, Newcastle
- University: Northumbria University
- Notable relative: Dave Thompson

Rugby union career
- Position: Hooker
- Current team: Newcastle Falcons
Youth career
- Gosforth
Senior career
Years	Team	Apps	(Points)
2001–2014	Newcastle Falcons	136	(55)
2015–16	Ealing Trailfinders	7	(0)

Matt Thompson (born 12 December 1982 in Brighton, England) is a retired rugby union player who last played for Newcastle Falcons in the Aviva Premiership. Thompson plays as a Hooker.

Thompson was a replacement as Newcastle won the 2004 Anglo-Welsh Cup final. He retired in 2014.
