= Tosan Evbuomwan =

British basketball player (born 2001)

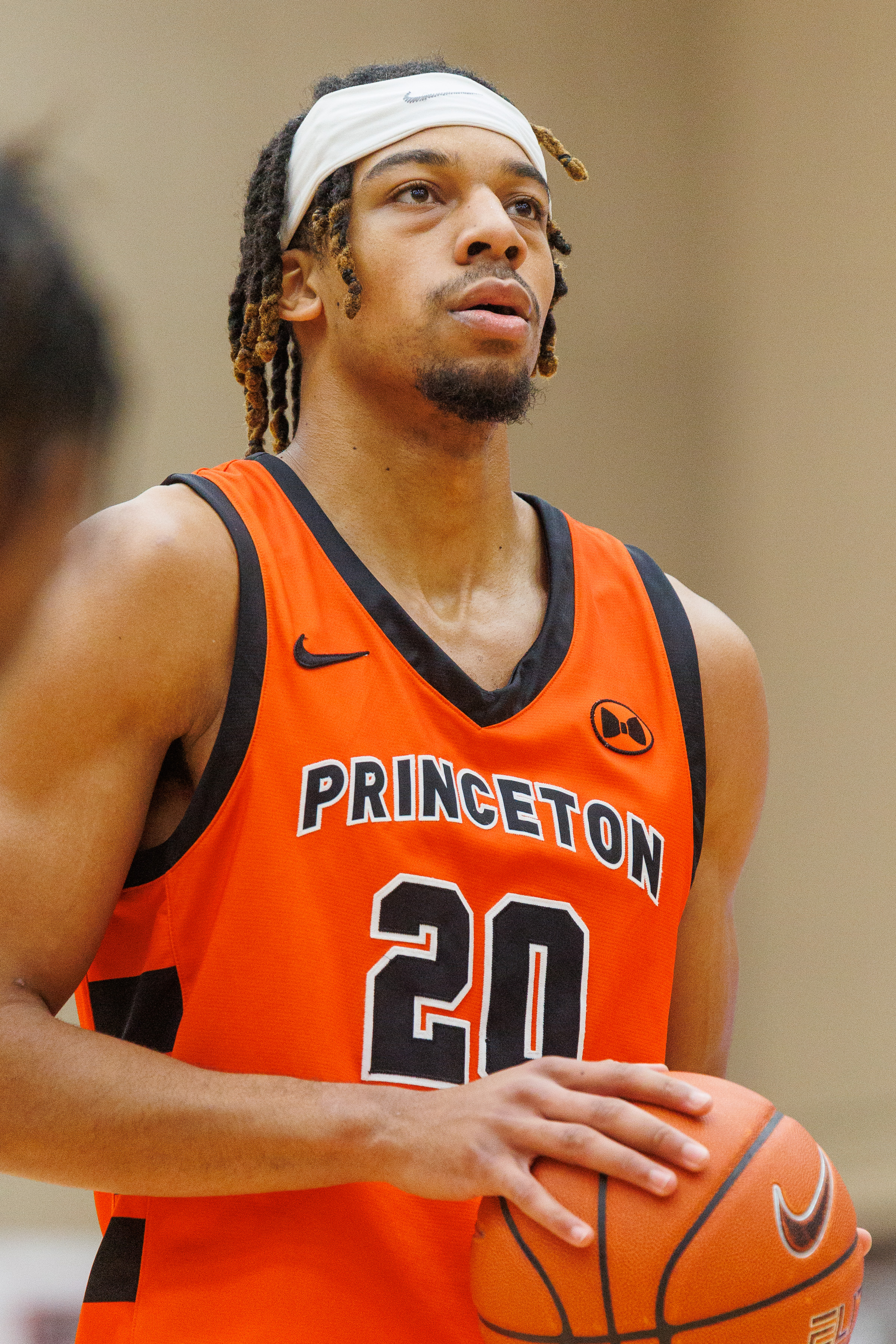
- Evbuomwan with Princeton in 2023

No. 20 – FC Barcelona
- Position: Small forward / Power forward
- League: Liga ACB; EuroLeague

Personal information
- Born: 16 February 2001 (age 25) Newcastle, England
- Listed height: 2.05 m (6 ft 9 in)
- Listed weight: 217 lb (98 kg)

Career information
- High school: Royal Grammar School (Newcastle, England)
- College: Princeton (2019–2023)
- NBA draft: 2023: undrafted
- Playing career: 2023–present

Career history
- 2023–2024: Motor City Cruise
- 2024: Memphis Grizzlies
- 2024: Detroit Pistons
- 2024: →Motor City Cruise
- 2024: San Diego Clippers
- 2025: Brooklyn Nets
- 2025: →Long Island Nets
- 2025: New York Knicks
- 2025–2026: →Westchester Knicks
- 2026: Maine Celtics
- 2026: Greensboro Swarm
- 2026–present: FC Barcelona

Career highlights
- NBA Cup champion (2025); NBA G League champion (2026); NBA G League Finals MVP (2026); Ivy League Player of the Year (2022); 2× First-team All-Ivy League (2022, 2023)
- Stats at NBA.com
- Stats at Basketball Reference

Torisesan "Tosan" Evbuomwan (eh-WOH-mah; born 16 February 2001) is a British professional basketball player for FC Barcelona of the Liga ACB and the EuroLeague. He played college basketball for the Princeton Tigers.

== Early life ==
Evbuomwan was born and raised in Newcastle upon Tyne, England. His father, Isaac, is a gynecologist who played college basketball at the University of Lagos in his native Nigeria. His mother, Michelle, who was born to a Nigerian father and Irish mother, moved to Lagos when she was 21 years old. Using her commercial pilot's license she earned in the UK, she became the first female captain to pilot a plane in Nigeria. Michelle met Isaac when she went in for a physical and they began dating. Isaac moved to England for work one year later and Michelle followed him there; they decided to settle in Newcastle after starting a family.

Evbuomwan's mother died of breast cancer on 16 November 2012. Evbuomwan grew up playing football, rugby, cricket and track & field, and was a standout football star, being selected to Newcastle United's Youth Academy. He had a basketball hoop at his house because his father had played in Nigeria, but he did not begin playing basketball competitively until age 14. Evbuomwan attended Royal Grammar School, Newcastle upon Tyne and helped start the basketball team there with a friend. He subsequently played for the Newcastle Eagles U18 team and took part in the Deng Camp run by Luol Deng, in which his play began receiving more attention. Eagles head coach Ian MacLeod sent highlight clips of the star player to American universities, and Princeton assistant coach Brett MacConnell was impressed, and suggested to head coach Mitch Henderson to recruit him. Evbuomwan signed with Princeton in April 2019.

== College career ==
Evbuomwan averaged 3.9 points, 1.8 rebounds and 0.9 assists per game as a freshman at Princeton, making 19 starts. The 2020–21 season was cancelled in the Ivy League due to the COVID-19 pandemic. He practiced against the Newcastle Eagles during the pandemic and joined Great Britain's 3x3 team in Tel Aviv.

On 4 December 2021, Evbuomwan scored a career-high 27 points in an 81–79 overtime win against Drexel. He matched his career high of 27 points as well as seven rebounds and five steals on 4 February 2022, in an 88–83 loss to Cornell. As a junior, Evbuomwan was named unanimous Ivy League Player of the Year.

In 2023, Evbuomwan was named First Team All-Ivy League and First Team All-District. On 30 March 2023, he declared for the 2023 NBA draft.

== Professional career ==
=== Motor City Cruise (2023–2024) ===
After going undrafted in the 2023 NBA draft, Evbuomwan joined the Detroit Pistons for the 2023 NBA Summer League and on 2 October 2023, he signed with them. However, he was waived on 21 October 2023, and nine days later he joined the Motor City Cruise.

=== Memphis Grizzlies (2024) ===
On 30 January 2024, Evbuomwan signed a 10-day contract with the Memphis Grizzlies after averaging 15.1 points, 8.4 rebounds and 3.9 assists in 34.5 minutes for the Cruise. He was active for his first NBA game on 1 February 2024, against the Cleveland Cavaliers, though he did not make his NBA debut until the following day against the Golden State Warriors. On 4 February 2024, he put up a career-high 12 rebounds (including 7 offensive rebounds) in a 131–91 blowout loss to the Boston Celtics.

=== Return to Motor City / Detroit Pistons (2024) ===
On 9 February 2024, Evbuomwan returned to the Motor City Cruise. On 13 February 2024, Evbuomwan signed a 10-day contract with the Detroit Pistons and on 23 February 2024, he signed a two-way contract with the Pistons. On 16 October 2024, he was waived by the Pistons.

=== San Diego Clippers (2024) ===
On 19 October 2024, Evbuomwan signed an Exhibit 10 contract with the Los Angeles Clippers, but was waived on the same day. On 28 October 2024, he joined the San Diego Clippers.

=== Brooklyn / Long Island Nets (2025) ===
On 1 January 2025, Evbuomwan signed a two-way contract with the Brooklyn Nets. On 12 January 2025, in a loss to the Utah Jazz, Evbuomwan scored a career-high 22 points with five rebounds and one assist. On 29 August 2025, Evbuomwan was waived by the Nets.

=== New York / Westchester Knicks (2025–2026) ===
On 16 September 2025, Evbuomwan signed a two-way contract with the New York Knicks. He made five appearances for New York, averaging 0.4 rebounds and scoring no points. On 7 January 2026, Evbuomwan was waived by the Knicks.

=== Maine Celtics (2026) ===
On 14 January 2026, Evbuomwan signed with the Maine Celtics of the NBA G League.

=== Greensboro Swarm (2026) ===
On 6 February 2026, Evbuomwan signed with the Charlotte Hornets on a two-way contract. In the NBA G League finals, he led the Greensboro Swarm with 22 points, seven rebounds and three assists, earning NBA G League Finals MVP honors. On 6 July, Evbuomwan was waived by the Hornets before ever appearing in a game.

=== FC Barcelona (2026–present) ===
On 27 July 2026, Evbuomwan signed with FC Barcelona of the Spanish Liga ACB and the EuroLeague.

== National team career ==
Evbuomwan has represented Great Britain at several international competitions. He participated in the 2018 FIBA U18 European Championship. At the 2019 FIBA U18 European Championship, he averaged 10.4 points, 7.9 rebounds and 2.6 assists per game.

== Career statistics ==
Legend
GP	Games played	GS	Games started	MPG	Minutes per game
FG%	Field goal percentage	3P%	3-point field goal percentage	FT%	Free throw percentage
RPG	Rebounds per game	APG	Assists per game	SPG	Steals per game
BPG	Blocks per game	PPG	Points per game	**Bold**	Career high

=== NBA ===
Year	Team	GP	GS	MPG	FG%	3P%	FT%	RPG	APG	SPG	BPG	PPG
2023–24	Memphis	4	0	18.5	.267	.250	–	3.5	1.5	.0	.3	2.5
2023–24	Detroit	13	**8**	22.5	**.571**	**.417**	.680	3.5	.8	.5	.3	7.0
2024–25	Brooklyn	**28**	0	**23.8**	.427	.312	**.753**	**4.3**	**2.0**	**.9**	**.4**	**9.5**
2025–26	New York	5	0	1.6	.000	–	–	.4	.0	.0	.0	.0
Career		50	8	20.8	.445	.330	.735	3.6	1.4	.6	.3	7.4
