= Nick Brownlee =

British journalist and writer

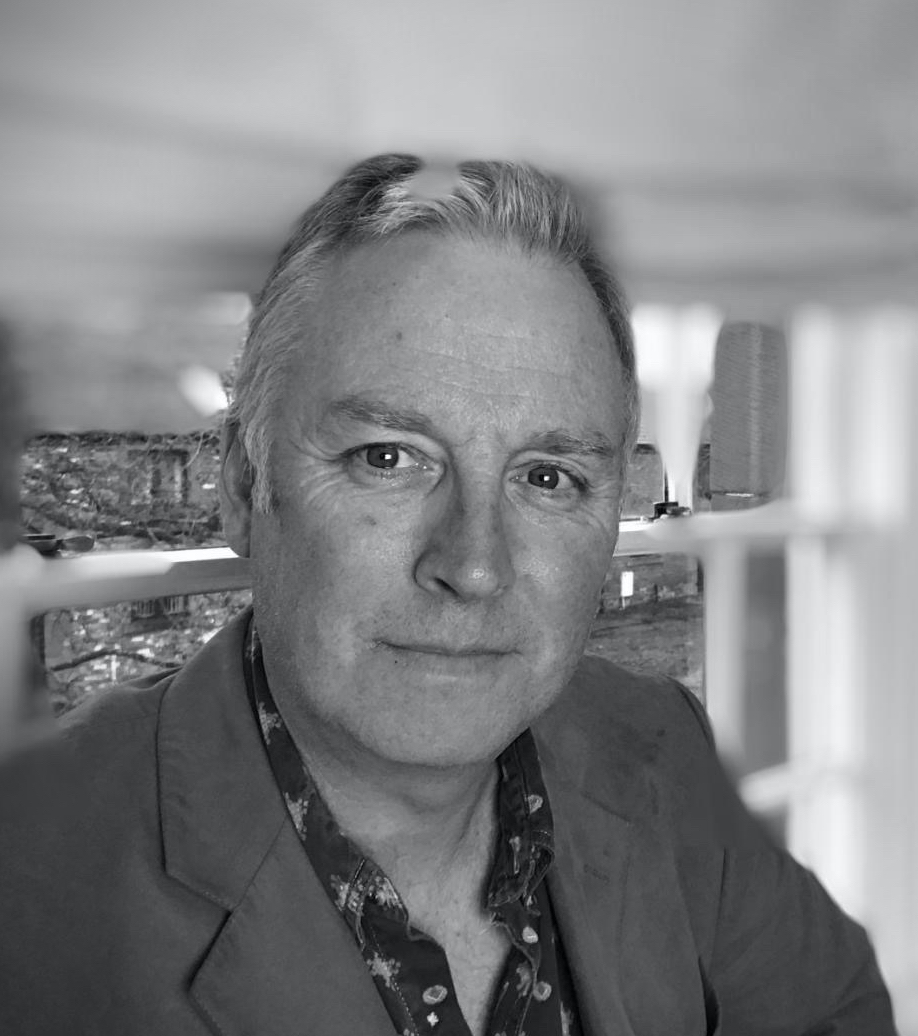
- Author Nick Brownlee, pictured in 2020
- Born: 16 December 1967 (age 58); Blyth, Northumberland
- Writing career
- Genre: Crime fiction

Nick Brownlee is a British journalist and crime thriller writer.

His critically acclaimed debut novel, Bait, published in December 2008 by Piatkus, was the first in a series featuring Kenyan crimebusting duo Jake Moore and Detective Inspector Daniel Jouma. The second, Burn, was published in June 2009, and the third, Machete in July 2010. The fourth in the series, Snakepit, was published in 2011.

In 2014, writing as Jim Ford, Brownlee produced three crime novellas set in his native Newcastle and featuring Detective Superintendent Theo Vos. "The Bug House", "Punch Drunk" and "In Vitro" were issued as ebooks by Constable & Robinson, and later bought by German publishing house Goldmann.

== Biography ==
Brownlee was born in Blyth, Northumberland, and educated at the Royal Grammar School, Newcastle, and the University of Leeds.

After leaving university he joined the Newcastle Evening Chronicle as a reporter, and continued to work for local newspapers in the North-East for several years before moving to London to work as a feature writer for The People. In 2000 he became a freelance writer, contributing to national newspapers and magazines. He now lives in Cumbria with his wife, daughter and dog.

== Non-Fiction Work ==
Brownlee's first book, a guide to Coronation Street, was published shortly after leaving The People. Since then he has written several non-fiction titles on subjects ranging from cannabis to manufactured pop music. His last book was a history of the Tour de France, entitled Vive Le Tour, published in 2007. This book was reissued in May 2010 and May 2013 by Anova Books, with updated entries and foreword. He has also updated a book of World Cup football trivia, The Amazing World Cup Compendium, to coincide with the 2010 World Cup Finals.

== The Jake & Jouma Series ==
In late 2007, Brownlee's manuscript for Bait was one of a handful selected for publication by Macmillan New Writing. However the same day he was also offered a contract by London-based literary agency Gregory & Company. Choosing to go with the latter, Bait was subsequently bought by Piatkus, an imprint of Little, Brown publishers, as part of a two-book deal featuring the characters Daniel Jouma and Jake Moore.

The novel was published in December 2008, and the sequel, Burn, in June 2009. Two more Jake and Jouma novels were published by Piatkus: Machete, in July 2010, and Snakepit, in July 2011.

In January 2009 Bait was reviewed on the Simon Mayo Book Panel on BBC Radio 5 Live. Brownlee himself has appeared as a reviewer on the show on several occasions in 2009.

In April 2010, US magazine Booklist included the book in its list of Best Crime Novels of the Year.

== The Bug House Series ==
Set in Newcastle and featuring investigations carried out by a small team of detectives under the watchful eye of Detective Superintendent Theo Vos, the "Bug House" series (the name derives from the office where the detectives are based) was purchased by Constable Robinson in 2013 and published as three ebook novellas throughout 2014. For this series, Brownlee wrote under the pen name Jim Ford.

== Other Fiction ==
In April 2010, one of Brownlee's short stories, Withholding The Evidence, was included in an anthology entitled No Man & Other Stories To Help Haiti. The collection, which also features the work of Alexander McCall Smith and William Peter Blatty, is available exclusively in ebook form, with all profits going to Unicef to aid victims of the Haiti earthquake.
