= 2021–22 Columbia Lions men's basketball team =

American college basketball season

2021–22 Columbia Lions men's basketball
- Conference: Ivy League
- Record: 4–22 (1–13 Ivy)
- Head coach: Jim Engles (5th season)
- Assistant coaches: Tobe Carberry; Jake Brown; Bruce Hamburger
- Home arena: Levien Gymnasium

2021–22 Ivy League men's basketball standings
	Conf.				Overall
Team	W		L	PCT	W		L	PCT
Princeton	12	–	2	.857	23	–	7	.767
Yale †	11	–	3	.786	19	–	12	.613
Penn	9	–	5	.643	12	–	16	.429
Cornell	7	–	7	.500	15	–	11	.577
Dartmouth	6	–	8	.429	9	–	16	.360
Harvard	5	–	9	.357	13	–	13	.500
Brown	5	–	9	.357	13	–	16	.448
Columbia	1	–	13	.071	4	–	22	.154
† 2022 Ivy League Tournament winner

The 2021–22 Columbia Lions men's basketball team represented Columbia University in the 2021–22 NCAA Division I men's basketball season. The Lions, led by fifth-year head coach Jim Engles, played their home games at Levien Gymnasium in New York City as members of the Ivy League.

== Previous season ==
Due to the COVID-19 pandemic, the Ivy League chose not to conduct a season in 2020–21.

== Roster ==
2021–22 Columbia Lions men's basketball team
Players
Coaches

Pos.	#	Name	Height	Weight	Year	Hometown
G	0	Jaden Cooper	6 ft 3 in (1.91 m)	170 lb (77 kg)	Fr	Goldsboro, NC
G	1	Luke Bolster	6 ft 0 in (1.83 m)	175 lb (79 kg)	GS	New York, NY
G	2	Ben Milstein	5 ft 10 in (1.78 m)	165 lb (75 kg)	Sr	Boca Raton, FL
G	3	Zavian McLean	6 ft 4 in (1.93 m)	203 lb (92 kg)	So	Spring Lake, NC
F	4	Liam Murphy	6 ft 7 in (2.01 m)	220 lb (100 kg)	So	Staten Island, NY
F	5	Emmanuel Onuama	6 ft 8 in (2.03 m)	219 lb (99 kg)	Jr	Aguleri, Nigeria
F	10	Asa Shannon	6 ft 6 in (1.98 m)	185 lb (84 kg)	Jr	Hyattsville, MD
F	11	Josh Odunowo	6 ft 6 in (1.98 m)	195 lb (88 kg)	So	Laurel, MD
G/F	12	Cameron Shockley-Okeke	6 ft 6 in (1.98 m)	197 lb (89 kg)	Jr	Norwalk, CT
G	14	Eddie Turner III	6 ft 2 in (1.88 m)	179 lb (81 kg)	Jr	Seattle, WA
G	15	Geronimo Rubio De La Rosa	6 ft 2 in (1.88 m)	170 lb (77 kg)	Fr	Santiago, Dominican Republic
F	20	Robbie Stankard	6 ft 9 in (2.06 m)	225 lb (102 kg)	Fr	Westwood, MA
F	24	Ike Nweke	6 ft 7 in (2.01 m)	248 lb (112 kg)	Sr	Woodbine, MD
F	25	Patrick Harding	6 ft 9 in (2.06 m)	237 lb (108 kg)	Jr	Fairfield, CT
G	32	Maka Ellis	6 ft 5 in (1.96 m)	175 lb (79 kg)	Sr	Las Vegas, NV
F/C	34	Jake Tavroff	6 ft 9 in (2.06 m)	230 lb (104 kg)	Fr	Oceanside, NY
F	35	Noah Robledo	6 ft 5 in (1.96 m)	167 lb (76 kg)	Fr	Leander, TX

Head coach

- Jim Engles (Dickinson)

Assistant coach(es)

- Tobe Carberry (Vermont)
- Jake Brown (Middlebury)
- Bruce Hamburger (Central Connecticut State)

Legend

- (C) Team captain
- (S) Suspended
- (I) Ineligible
- (W) Walk-on
- Injured
- Current redshirt

Roster
Last update: December 27, 2021

== Schedule and results ==
Date time, TV	Rank^{#}	Opponent^{#}	Result	Record	Site (attendance) city, state
Non-conference regular season
November 9, 2021*; 8:00 pm, ESPN+		at Fordham	L 67–77	0–1	Rose Hill Gymnasium (1,100); Bronx, NY
November 12, 2021*; 7:00 pm, ESPN+		Marist	L 67–82	0–2	Levien Gymnasium (891); New York, NY
November 17, 2021*; 7:00 pm, ESPN+		Binghamton	W 85–77 ^{OT}	1–2	Levien Gymnasium (630); New York, NY
November 20, 2021*; 2:00 pm, ESPN+		Mount Saint Vincent	W 87–62	2–2	Levien Gymnasium (562); New York, NY
November 23, 2021*; 7:00 pm, ESPN+		at Lehigh	L 72–79	2–3	Stabler Arena (618); Bethlehem, PA
November 26, 2021*; 2:00 pm, ACCNX/ESPN+		at Boston College	L 60–73	2–4	Conte Forum (4,077); Chestnut Hill, MA
November 29, 2021*; 7:00 pm, ESPN+		Lafayette	L 50–73	2–5	Levien Gymnasium (628); New York, NY
December 1, 2021*; 7:00 pm, ESPN+		at UMBC	L 60–98	2–6	Chesapeake Employers Insurance Arena (1,813); Catonsville, MD
December 4, 2021*; 2:00 pm, ESPN+		Maine	W 77–66	3–6	Levien Gymnasium (662); New York, NY
December 6, 2021*; 7:00 pm		at Colgate	L 61–89	3–7	Cotterell Court (456); Hamilton, NY
December 11, 2021*; 7:00 pm, ESPN3		at Albany	L 59–60	3–8	SEFCU Arena (2,245); Albany, NY
December 13, 2021*; 8:00 pm, ESPN+		Sacred Heart	L 69–79	3–9	Levien Gymnasium (553); New York, NY
December 28, 2021*; 8:00 pm		Maryland Eastern Shore	Canceled due to COVID-19 concerns and safety protocols		Levien Gymnasium; New York, NY
Ivy League regular season
January 7, 2022; 7:00 pm, ESPN+		at Princeton	L 69–84	3–10 (0–1)	Jadwin Gymnasium (35); Princeton, NJ
January 8, 2022; 6:00 pm, ESPN+		at Penn	W 73–69	4–10 (1–1)	The Palestra (125); Philadelphia, PA
January 15, 2022; 2:00 pm, ESPN+		Harvard	L 82–91	4–11 (1–2)	Levien Gymnasium; New York, NY
January 17, 2022; 4:00 pm, ESPN+		at Cornell	Postponed due to an impending winter storm		Newman Arena; Ithaca, NY
January 22, 2022; 2:00 pm, SNY/ESPN+		Brown	L 74–93	4–12 (1–3)	Levien Gymnasium (140); New York, NY
January 25, 2022; 7:00 pm, ESPN+		at Yale	L 72–83	4–13 (1–4)	John J. Lee Amphitheater (0); New Haven, CT
January 29, 2022; 2:00 pm, ESPN+		Dartmouth	L 63–76	4–14 (1–5)	Levien Gymnasium (111); New York, NY
February 4, 2022; 7:00 pm, ESPN+		Penn	L 66–81	4–15 (1–6)	Levien Gymnasium (101); New York, NY
February 5, 2022; 7:00 pm, SNY/ESPN+		Princeton	L 63–85	4–16 (1–7)	Levien Gymnasium (84); New York, NY
February 9, 2022; 5:00 pm, ESPN+		at Cornell; Rescheduled from January 17	L 75–88	4–17 (1–8)	Newman Arena (575); Ithaca, NY
February 12, 2022; 2:00 pm, SNY/ESPN+		Yale	L 59–84	4–18 (1–9)	Levien Gymnasium (977); New York, NY
February 18, 2022; 7:00 pm, ESPN+		at Harvard	L 54–62	4–19 (1–10)	Lavietes Pavilion (1,118); Allston, MA
February 19, 2022; 7:00 pm, ESPN+		at Dartmouth	L 50–79	4–20 (1–11)	Leede Arena (0); Hanover, NH
February 26, 2022; 6:00 pm, ESPN+		at Brown	L 74–81	4–21 (1–12)	Pizzitola Sports Center (715); Providence, RI
March 5, 2022; 4:00 pm, ESPN+		Cornell	L 64–78	4–22 (1–13)	Levien Gymnasium (1,823); New York, NY
*Non-conference game. ^{#}Rankings from AP Poll. (#) Tournament seedings in parentheses. All times are in Eastern.

== See also ==
- 2021–22 Columbia Lions women's basketball team
