= 2021–22 Dartmouth Big Green men's basketball team =

American college basketball season

2021–22 Dartmouth Big Green men's basketball
- Conference: Ivy League
- Record: 9–16 (6–8 Ivy)
- Head coach: David McLaughlin (5th season)
- Associate head coach: Justin Bradley
- Assistant coaches: Jabari Trotter; Josh Einhorn
- Home arena: Leede Arena

2021–22 Ivy League men's basketball standings
| | Conf. | | | | Overall |
| Team | W | | L | PCT | W | | L | PCT |
|---|---|---|---|---|---|---|---|---|
| Princeton | 12 | – | 2 | .857 | 23 | – | 7 | .767 |
| Yale † | 11 | – | 3 | .786 | 19 | – | 12 | .613 |
| Penn | 9 | – | 5 | .643 | 12 | – | 16 | .429 |
| Cornell | 7 | – | 7 | .500 | 15 | – | 11 | .577 |
| Dartmouth | 6 | – | 8 | .429 | 9 | – | 16 | .360 |
| Harvard | 5 | – | 9 | .357 | 13 | – | 13 | .500 |
| Brown | 5 | – | 9 | .357 | 13 | – | 16 | .448 |
| Columbia | 1 | – | 13 | .071 | 4 | – | 22 | .154 |
† 2022 Ivy League Tournament winner

The 2021–22 Dartmouth Big Green men's basketball team represented Dartmouth College in the 2021–22 NCAA Division I men's basketball season. The Big Green, led by fifth-year head coach David McLaughlin, play their home games at Leede Arena in Hanover, New Hampshire as members of the Ivy League.

== Previous season ==
Due to the COVID-19 pandemic, the Ivy League chose not to conduct a season in 2020–21.

== Roster ==
2021–22 Dartmouth Big Green men's basketball team
Players
Coaches

| Pos. | # | Name | Height | Weight | Year | Hometown |
|---|---|---|---|---|---|---|
| G | 0 | Jayden Reaves | 6 ft 0 in (1.83 m) | 185 lb (84 kg) | Jr | New York, New York |
| G | 1 | Taurus Samuels | 6 ft 1 in (1.85 m) | 190 lb (86 kg) | Sr | Oceanside, California |
| F | 2 | Cade Haskins | 6 ft 6 in (1.98 m) | 200 lb (91 kg) | Fr | Minneapolis, Minnesota |
| F | 3 | Dusan Neskovic | 6 ft 7 in (2.01 m) | 205 lb (93 kg) | So | Banja Luka, Bosnia and Herzegovina |
| G | 4 | Izaiah Robinson | 6 ft 3 in (1.91 m) | 200 lb (91 kg) | So | Montclair, New Jersey |
| G | 5 | Jaren Johnson | 6 ft 5 in (1.96 m) | 185 lb (84 kg) | So | Lynwood, California |
| G | 10 | Ryan Cornish | 6 ft 3 in (1.91 m) | 170 lb (77 kg) | Fr | Potomac, Maryland |
| G | 11 | Wes Slajchert | 6 ft 4 in (1.93 m) | 190 lb (86 kg) | Sr | Oak Park, California |
| F | 12 | Paul Hudson | 6 ft 6 in (1.98 m) | 230 lb (104 kg) | Jr | Charlotte, North Carolina |
| G | 14 | Jackson Blaufeld | 6 ft 4 in (1.93 m) | 195 lb (88 kg) | Jr | Pittsburgh, Pennsylvania |
| G | 15 | Brendan Barry | 6 ft 2 in (1.88 m) | 180 lb (82 kg) | GS | Fair Haven, New Jersey |
| G | 20 | Romeo Myrthil | 6 ft 2 in (1.88 m) | 185 lb (84 kg) | Fr | Solna, Sweden |
| F | 21 | Aaryn Rai | 6 ft 6 in (1.98 m) | 220 lb (100 kg) | Sr | Markham, Ontario |
| F | 22 | Garrison Wade | 6 ft 6 in (1.98 m) | 210 lb (95 kg) | Sr | Madison, Mississippi |
| G | 23 | Robert McRae III | 6 ft 3 in (1.91 m) | 200 lb (91 kg) | So | Inglewood, California |
| F | 24 | Cam Krystkowiak | 6 ft 9 in (2.06 m) | 210 lb (95 kg) | Jr | San Diego, California |
| F | 25 | Connor Christensen | 6 ft 6 in (1.98 m) | 195 lb (88 kg) | Fr | Eden Prairie, Minnesota |
| F | 32 | Dame Adelekun | 6 ft 8 in (2.03 m) | 220 lb (100 kg) | Jr | Gastonia, North Carolina |
| F | 33 | Nate Ogbu | 6 ft 7 in (2.01 m) | 220 lb (100 kg) | Jr | Stone Mountain, Georgia |
| F | 44 | Nikola Dimitrijevic | 6 ft 10 in (2.08 m) | 225 lb (102 kg) | Fr | Belgrade, Serbia |

Head coach

- David McLaughlin (Colby)

Assistant coach(es)

- Justin Bradley (Guilford)
- Jabari Trotter (Dartmouth)
- Josh Einhorn (Pittsburgh)

Legend

- (C) Team captain
- (S) Suspended
- (I) Ineligible
- (W) Walk-on
- Injured
- Current redshirt

Roster
Last update: January 4, 2022

== Schedule and results ==
| Date time, TV | Rank^{#} | Opponent^{#} | Result | Record | Site (attendance) city, state |
Regular season
| November 9, 2021*; 8:00 pm, ACCNX | | at Boston College | L 57–73 | 0–1 | Conte Forum (4,218); Chestnut Hill, MA |
| November 13, 2021*; 2:00 pm, FS2 | | at Georgetown | W 69–60 | 1–1 | Capital One Arena (8,641); Washington, D.C. |
| November 16, 2021*; 7:00 pm, ESPN+ | | NVU–Lyndon | W 114–74 | 2–1 | Leede Arena (523); Hanover, NH |
| November 28, 2021*; 4:00 pm | | at Bryant | W 63–61 ^{OT} | 3–1 | Chace Athletic Center (759); Smithfield, RI |
| December 1, 2021*; 7:00 pm, ESPN3 | | at Vermont | L 65–83 | 3–2 | Patrick Gym (2,321); Burlington, VT |
| December 4, 2021*; 7:00 pm, ESPN+ | | at Florida Gulf Coast | L 68–78 ^{OT} | 3–3 | Alico Arena (1,910); Fort Myers, FL |
| December 8, 2021*; 7:00 pm, ESPN+ | | Quinnipiac | L 69–72 | 3–4 | Leede Arena (305); Hanover, NH |
| December 11, 2021*; 6:30 pm, NESN | | Boston University | L 62–65 | 3–5 | Leede Arena (501); Hanover, NH |
| December 16, 2021*; 10:00 pm, P12N | | at Stanford | L 78–89 ^{OT} | 3–6 | Maples Pavilion (2,352); Stanford, CA |
| December 19, 2021*; 4:00 pm, P12N | | at California | L 55–61 | 3–7 | Haas Pavilion (3,977); Berkeley, CA |
| December 21, 2021*; 5:00 pm, ESPN+ | | at Cal State Bakersfield | L 57–61 | 3–8 | Icardo Center (840); Bakersfield, CA |
| December 29, 2021*; 1:00 pm, ESPN+ | | New Hampshire | Postponed due to COVID-19 protocols | | Leede Arena; Hanover, NH |
| January 2, 2022; 2:00 pm, ESPN+ | | at Cornell | L 71–79 | 3–9 (0–1) | Newman Arena (361); Ithaca, NY |
| January 8, 2022; 7:00 pm, ESPN+ | | Brown | W 58–46 | 4–9 (1–1) | Leede Arena (109); Hanover, NH |
| January 11, 2022*; 7:00 pm, ESPN+ | | NVU–Johnson | Postponed due to COVID-19 protocols | | Leede Arena; Hanover, NH |
| January 15, 2022; 2:00 pm, ESPN+ | | at Penn | L 68–78 | 4–10 (1–2) | The Palestra (150); Philadelphia, PA |
| January 17, 2022; 7:00 pm, NESN | | Harvard | L 59–60 | 4–11 (1–3) | Leede Arena (88); Hanover, NH |
| January 22, 2022; 2:00 pm, ESPN+ | | Princeton | L 80–84 | 4–12 (1–4) | Leede Arena (327); Hanover, NH |
| January 29, 2022; 2:00 pm, ESPN+ | | at Columbia | W 76–63 | 5–12 (2–4) | Levien Gymnasium (111); New York, NY |
| February 4, 2022; 5:00 pm, ESPNU | | at Yale | L 69–72 | 5–13 (2–5) | John J. Lee Amphitheater (125); New Haven, CT |
| February 5, 2022; 6:00 pm, ESPN+ | | at Brown | L 60–62 | 5–14 (2–6) | Pizzitola Sports Center (575); Providence, RI |
| February 12, 2022; 4:00 pm, ESPN+ | | at Princeton | L 40–85 | 5–15 (2–7) | Jadwin Gymnasium (936); Princeton, NJ |
| February 18, 2022; 7:00 pm, ESPN+ | | Cornell | W 71–59 | 6–15 (3–7) | Leede Arena (532); Hanover, NH |
| February 19, 2022; 7:00 pm, ESPN+ | | Columbia | W 79–50 | 7–15 (4–7) | Leede Arena (0); Hanover, NH |
| February 22, 2022; 6:00 pm, ESPN+ | | Yale; Rescheduled from January 7 | L 61–66 | 7–16 (4–8) | Leede Arena (473); Hanover, NH |
| February 26, 2022; 2:00 pm, ESPN+ | | Penn | W 84–70 | 8–16 (5–8) | Leede Arena (784); Hanover, NH |
| March 5, 2022; 2:00 pm, ESPN+ | | at Harvard | W 76–54 | 9–16 (6–8) | Lavietes Pavilion (1,376); Allston, MA |
*Non-conference game. ^{#}Rankings from AP Poll. (#) Tournament seedings in parentheses. All times are in Eastern.
