= Tom Burke (environmentalist) =

British academic and writer on environmental policy issues

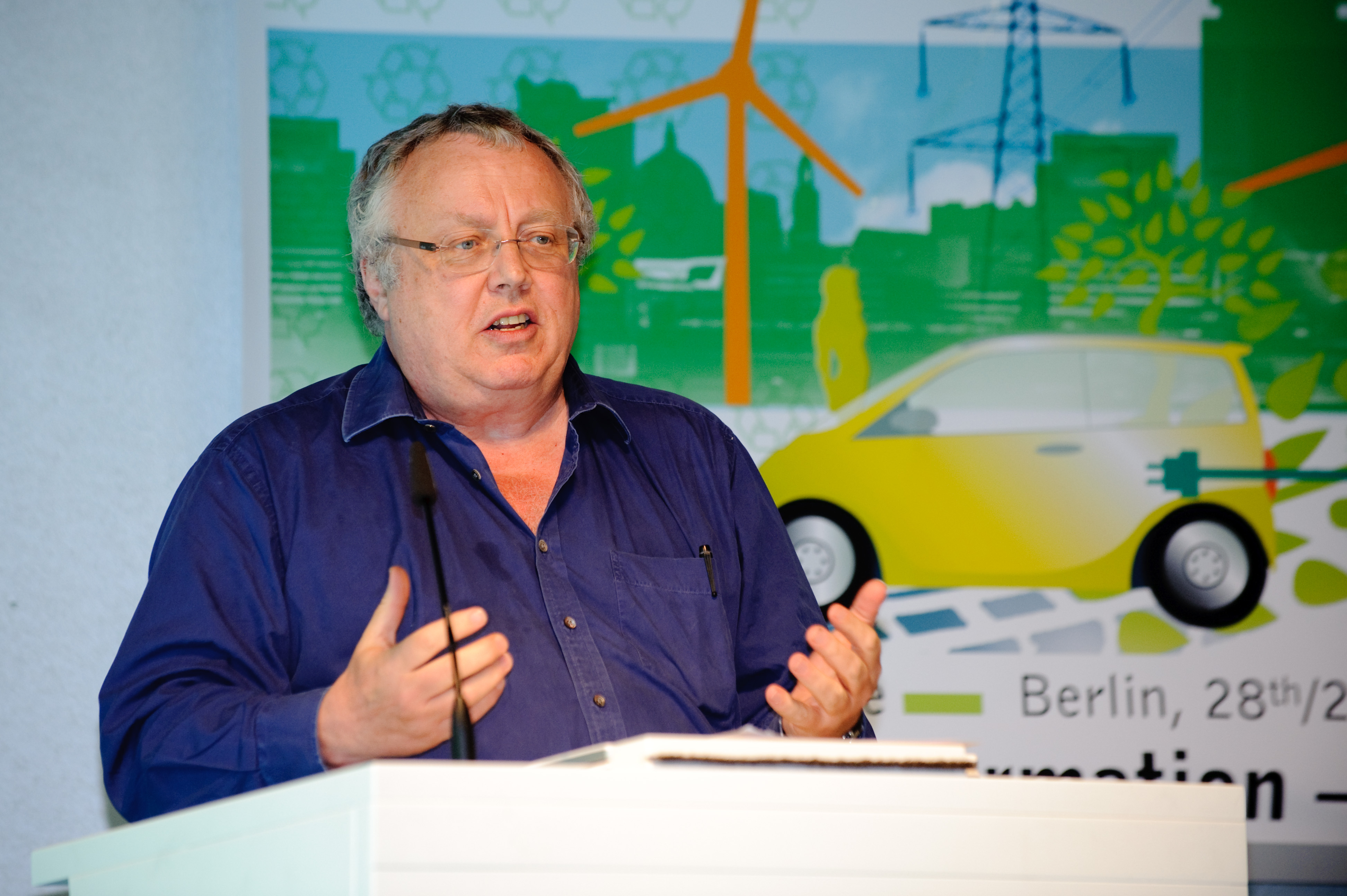
- Tom Burke, 2010
- Born: David Thomas Burke; 5 January 1947 (age 79); Cork, Ireland
- Education: BA (Hons) Liverpool, Philosophy St Boniface’s College Plymouth
- Occupation: Environmental Policy Adviser Writer Speaker
- Years active: 1970 - Present (53 years)
- Organization: E3G
- Awards: CBE (1997)
- Website: http://tomburke.co.uk/

Tom Burke CBE is a co-founder of E3G, Third Generation Environmentalism (environmental think tank founded in 2004) and former chair of its board. He is also a visiting honorary professor of Imperial and University Colleges, London, and a senior associate of Cambridge Institute for Sustainability Leadership (CISL). He has a long track record of experience with international environmental organisations working with and for both non-governmental and official bodies. Burke has been a professional environmentalist for 50 years and was formerly Executive Director of Friends of the Earth and of The Green Alliance. He was a Special Advisor to three Secretaries of State for the Environment from 1991–97.

He has been a senior advisor for a number of major companies including Rio Tinto, BP and Standard Chartered Bank. He has also served as an advisor in the Deputy Prime Minister's Office and the Foreign Office. He was a member of the Council of English Nature, Britain's biodiversity regulator, from 1999 to 2005.

He has written and broadcast extensively and coined the term green growth in 1987. In 1993, Burke was appointed to the United Nations Environment Programme's Global 500 Roll of Honour.

He played a leading part in establishing the European Environmental Bureau for nearly two decades and was the Secretary-General of the European and North American NGO preparations for the Rio Earth Summit.

In 1997, Burke was appointed CBE for services to the environment.

He is a frequent media commentator on broadcast and print media, speaker at events and active writer of blogs and on social media.

== Career ==
Burke is co-founder of E3G, Third Generation Environmentalism (environmental think tank) founded in 2004 and is currently a non-executive director, having previously been chairman of its board. He is responsible for supervising the overall fitness of the organisation to fulfil its mission.

He is a visiting professor at Imperial and University Colleges, London, and is chairman of the China Dialogue Trust which produces a number of online publications covering China and the environment. He is also a trustee of Climate Advisors UK, Black-E Community Arts Trust and Rising Tides Theatre Company.

He was an environmental policy adviser to Rio Tinto for 20 years (1996 to 2016) and was Chairman of the Editorial Board of ENDS Magazine (2004 to 2010) and he used to write a regular column in BusinessGreen magazine. From 2015 to 2022 he was on the advisory board for Glennmont Partners.

Burke has been an environmentalist since first joining a Friends of the Earth (FoE) local group in 1971. He joined the FoE staff in 1973 as its local groups coordinator and became its executive director in 1975. He was the Director of the Green Alliance from 1982 until 1991 when he became Michael Heseltine's special advisor. While at the Green Alliance, he ran for Parliament twice for the Social Democratic Party and the Liberal Democrats.

He played a leading part in establishing the European Environmental Bureau for nearly two decades and was the Secretary-General of the European and North American NGO preparations for the Rio Earth Summit. As a special advisor to three Secretaries of State for the Environment (1991–1997), Burke was intimately involved in a wide range of international negotiations as well as all aspects of domestic environment policy.

In 1997, Burke was appointed CBE for services to the environment. In 1993, Burke was appointed to the United Nations Environment Programme's Global 500 Roll of Honour.

Having begun developing dialogues with business while at the Green Alliance, he went to work for Rio Tinto and BP on leaving government in 1997. At Rio Tinto he created the Global Mining Initiative, which engaged the industry globally with sustainable development and drafted Rio Tinto's first climate policy in 1998. He also joined the Council of English Nature and was the government's statutory advisor on biodiversity as part of the Central Policy Group, Office of The Deputy Prime Minister where he served two terms until 2003.

Burke has co-authored several books including The Fragile City (with Charles Landry), Europe In the World (with Nick Mabey), The Green Capitalists (Gollancz, 1987), Green Pages (Routledge, 1988), and Ethics, Environment and the Company (IBE, 1990).

He has written and broadcast extensively and coined the term green growth in 1987. He remains actively involved on a wide range of environmental issues, working with NGOs, government and business. He is particularly active on energy and climate issues and is a prominent critic of the government's policy on nuclear power and has previously campaigned against nuclear power.

He endorsed the parliamentary candidacy of the Green Party's Caroline Lucas at the 2015 general election.

== Awards ==
- 1997 – CBE
- 1991 – United Nations Environment Programme ‘Global 500' Laureate
- 1969 – Royal Humane Society Testimonial on Parchment
- 1966 – Royal Humane Society Testimonial on Vellum

== Publications ==
=== Author ===
- The Fragile City (with Charles Landry) Commedia, 2014
- Europe In the World (with Nick Mabey) E3G, 2006
- Ethics, Environment and the Company (with Julie Hill), IBE, 1990
- Green Pages (with John Elkington and Julia Hales) RKP, 1988
- The Green Capitalists (with John Elkington) Gollancz, 1987
- Gaia Atlas of Planetary Management (contributor & consultant) Pan, 1984
- Ecology 200 (co-author and picture editor) M Joseph, 1984
- Environment and the Future, Environment Liaison Centre, 1983
- Pressure Groups in the Global System (co-author) F Pinter, 1982
- Europe Environment, Ecobooks, 1981
- Whale Manual II (co-author) FoE, 1974
- The Great Paperchase, FoE, 1974
- Waste and Recycling (filmstrip), Diana Wylie, 1974
- Articles in The Times, The Guardian, The Independent and New Statesman, Propect

=== Editor ===
- Wheels within Wheels (Hamer FoE 1974)
- Whale Manual I & II (King et al. FoE 1975)
- Food Co-ops (Hines, FoE 1976)
- Many Happy Returns (Bate, FoE 1976)
- Ecological Paper Buying (Cohen, FoE 1976)
- Nuclear Prospects (Flood & Grove-White, FoE/CPRE/NCCL 1976)
- Bicycle Planning Book (Hudson et al, FoE, Open Books 1978)
- The Declining Otter (King et al, FoE 1978)
- What Choice Windscale? (Conroy, FoE 1978)
- Polluters Pay (MacRory & Saba, FoE 1979)
- Is Nuclear Power Necessary? (Lovins, FoE 1979)
- Torness (Flood, FoE 1978)
- Economic Growth (Riley, FoE 1979)
