= John Elders =

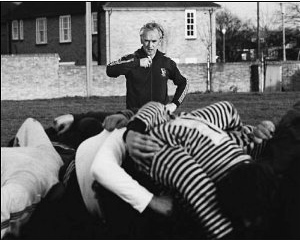
- Elders as England head coach in 1973
- Born: John Elders; 18 December 1930 England
- Died: 3 May 2015 (aged 84) Gosforth, England

Rugby union career
- Position: Centre
Senior career
Years	Team	Apps	(Points)
1953–1957	Leicester Tigers	144	(114)
1958	Barbarian FC	1	
1957-1959	Northern		
1959-1966	Old Novocastrians		
Coaching career
- Years: Team
- 1957-1982: Newcastle Royal Grammar School
- 1969-1970: Novocastrians
- 1971-1974: England
- 1976-1978: Novocastrians
- 1982-1992: Downlands College

John Elders (18 December 1930 – 3 May 2015) was an English rugby union player and coach. He played with Leicester Tigers between 1953 and 1958, scoring the third most tries in the 1950s for his club (38). Elders was also club captain for a number of seasons.

Elders coached the England team between 1972 and 1974. He guided England to their first ever away win against New Zealand, and also coached England through an unbeaten tour of South Africa. Elders played one game for Barbarian FC in the late 1950s.

Elders was the sports master at the Newcastle Royal Grammar School between 1957 and 1982. Whilst teaching there he played and coached for Northern FC and (Old) Novocastrians. He joined Old Novocastrians whilst a teacher at the Newcastle Royal Grammar School and was always an advocate for the club, helping bring many players to the club in the 1960s, 70s and 80s. Elders captained Old Novos from 1959 to 1961.

Elders coached the Downlands College First XV. The 1987 team went undefeated, including matches against Sydney's King's, Riverview and St Joseph's colleges. The side included future Wallabies Brett Johnstone, Brett Robinson, Garrick Morgan, Peter Ryan and Tim Horan.

He died on 3 May 2015, aged 84, after a long illness.
