= 2021–22 Cornell Big Red men's basketball team =

American college basketball season

2021–22 Cornell Big Red men's basketball
- Conference: Ivy League
- Record: 15–11 (7–7 Ivy)
- Head coach: Brian Earl (5th season)
- Assistant coaches: Jon Jaques; Alex Mumphard; Clay Wilson
- Home arena: Newman Arena

2021–22 Ivy League men's basketball standings
	Conf.				Overall
Team	W		L	PCT	W		L	PCT
Princeton	12	–	2	.857	23	–	7	.767
Yale †	11	–	3	.786	19	–	12	.613
Penn	9	–	5	.643	12	–	16	.429
Cornell	7	–	7	.500	15	–	11	.577
Dartmouth	6	–	8	.429	9	–	16	.360
Harvard	5	–	9	.357	13	–	13	.500
Brown	5	–	9	.357	13	–	16	.448
Columbia	1	–	13	.071	4	–	22	.154
† 2022 Ivy League Tournament winner

The 2021–22 Cornell Big Red men's basketball team represented Cornell University in the 2021–22 NCAA Division I men's basketball season. The Big Red, led by fifth-year head coach Brian Earl, played their home games at Newman Arena in Ithaca, New York as members of the Ivy League.

== Previous season ==
Due to the COVID-19 pandemic, the Ivy League chose not to conduct a season in 2020–21.

== Roster ==
2021–22 Cornell Big Red men's basketball team
Players
Coaches

Pos.	#	Name	Height	Weight	Year	Hometown
F	0	Evan Williams	6 ft 7 in (2.01 m)	220 lb (100 kg)	So	Murphy, Texas
F	2	Marcus Filien	6 ft 7 in (2.01 m)	210 lb (95 kg)	Jr	Rensselaer, New York
F/C	3	Ryan Kiachian	6 ft 10 in (2.08 m)	220 lb (100 kg)	Fr	Los Altos Hills, California
G	4	Greg Dolan	6 ft 3 in (1.91 m)	175 lb (79 kg)	Jr	Williamsville, New York
G	5	Nazir Williams	6 ft 3 in (1.91 m)	190 lb (86 kg)	Fr	Nyack, New York
F	10	Chuks Uzoka	6 ft 6 in (1.98 m)	209 lb (95 kg)	Jr	Richmond, Texas
F	12	Kobe Dickson	6 ft 9 in (2.06 m)	235 lb (107 kg)	Sr	Holcomb, Kansas
G	13	Sarju Patel	6 ft 3 in (1.91 m)	170 lb (77 kg)	Sr	Daleville, Virginia
G	14	Darius Ervin	5 ft 8 in (1.73 m)	160 lb (73 kg)	So	Brooklyn, New York
F	15	Keller Boothby	6 ft 7 in (2.01 m)	190 lb (86 kg)	So	Plano, Texas
F	20	Sean Hansen	6 ft 9 in (2.06 m)	220 lb (100 kg)	So	Ramsey, New Jersey
F	21	Guy Ragland Jr.	6 ft 8 in (2.03 m)	230 lb (104 kg)	Fr	West Hartford, Connecticut
F	23	Jordan Jones	6 ft 5 in (1.96 m)	195 lb (88 kg)	Jr	Thousand Oaks, California
G	24	Max Samberg	6 ft 3 in (1.91 m)	190 lb (86 kg)	Sr	Rye, New York
G	25	Dean Noll	6 ft 2 in (1.88 m)	180 lb (82 kg)	Sr	Medford, New Jersey
G	30	Chris Mañon	6 ft 5 in (1.96 m)	195 lb (88 kg)	So	New Milford, New Jersey
G	31	Isaiah Gray	6 ft 3 in (1.91 m)	210 lb (95 kg)	So	Brooklyn, New York
F	33	Chris Cain	6 ft 8 in (2.03 m)	220 lb (100 kg)	Fr	Middletown, New York

Head coach

- Brian Earl (Princeton)

Assistant coach(es)

- Jon Jaques (Cornell)
- Alex Mumphard (Greenville)
- Max Ginsberg (Cornell)

Legend

- (C) Team captain
- (S) Suspended
- (I) Ineligible
- (W) Walk-on
- Injured
- Current redshirt

Roster
Last update: January 25, 2022

== Schedule and results ==
Date time, TV	Rank^{#}	Opponent^{#}	Result	Record	Site (attendance) city, state
Non-conference regular season
November 9, 2021*; 7:30 pm, ESPN3		at Binghamton	W 76–69	1–0	Binghamton University Events Center (2,141); Vestal, NY
November 12, 2021*; 7:30 pm, ESPN+		at Lafayette	W 90–85	2–0	Kirby Sports Center (1,309); Easton, PA
November 16, 2021*; 7:00 pm, ESPN+		Colgate	W 78–68	3–0	Newman Arena (664); Ithaca, NY
November 19, 2021*; 7:00 pm, ESPN+		Wells	W 107–48	4–0	Newman Arena (712); Ithaca, NY
November 22, 2021*; 6:30 pm, BTN		at Penn State	L 74–85	4–1	Bryce Jordan Center (7,515); University Park, PA
November 24, 2021*; 4:00 pm, ESPN+		Saint Francis (PA)	W 93–80	5–1	Newman Arena (331); Ithaca, NY
November 29, 2021*; 7:00 pm, ESPN3		at Canisius	W 89–75	6–1	Koessler Center (856); Buffalo, NY
December 3, 2021*; 7:00 pm, ESPN+		Coppin State	W 92–77	7–1	Newman Arena (526); Ithaca, NY
December 5, 2021*; 1:00 pm, ESPN+		Keuka	W 122–64	8–1	Newman Arena (366); Ithaca, NY
December 8, 2021*; 9:00 pm, ACCN		at Virginia Tech	L 60–93	8–2	Cassell Coliseum (6,403); Blacksburg, VA
December 19, 2021*; 5:30 pm, ESPN+		Bryant	Canceled due to COVID-19 protocols		Newman Arena; Ithaca, NY
December 28, 2021*; 2:00 pm, ESPN+		Hartford	Canceled due to COVID-19 protocols		Newman Arena; Ithaca, NY
December 29, 2021*; 7:00 pm, YES		at Syracuse; Rescheduled from December 21	L 68–80	8–3	Carrier Dome (15,579); Syracuse, NY
Ivy League regular season
January 2, 2022; 2:00 pm, ESPN+		Dartmouth	W 79–71	9–3 (1–0)	Newman Arena (361); Ithaca, NY
January 7, 2022; 7:00 pm, ESPN+		at Penn	L 65–79	9–4 (1–1)	The Palestra (125); Philadelphia, PA
January 8, 2022; 6:00 pm, ESPN+		at Princeton	L 70–72	9–5 (1–2)	Jadwin Gymnasium (42); Princeton, NJ
January 15, 2022; 2:00 pm, ESPN+		at Yale	L 69–96	9–6 (1–3)	John J. Lee Amphitheater; New Haven, CT
January 17, 2022; 2:00 pm, ESPN+		Columbia	Postponed due to weather		Newman Arena; Ithaca, NY
January 22, 2022; 2:00 pm, ESPN+		at Harvard	W 76–61	10–6 (2–3)	Newman Arena (877); Ithaca, NY
January 30, 2022; 11:00 am, ESPN+		at Brown	W 74–72	11–6 (3–3)	Pizzitola Sports Center (225); Providence, RI
February 4, 2022; 7:00 pm, ESPN+		Princeton	W 88–83	12–6 (4–3)	Newman Arena (864); Ithaca, NY
February 5, 2022; 6:00 pm, ESPN+		Penn	L 68–73	12–7 (4–4)	Newman Arena (899); Ithaca, NY
February 9, 2022; 5:00 pm, ESPN+		Columbia; Rescheduled from January 17	W 88–75	13–7 (5–4)	Newman Arena (575); Ithaca, NY
February 12, 2022; 2:00 pm, ESPN+		Brown	L 80–81	13–8 (5–5)	Newman Arena (0); Ithaca, NY
February 18, 2022; 7:00 pm, ESPN+		at Dartmouth	L 59–71	13–9 (5–6)	Leede Arena (532); Hanover, NH
February 19, 2022; 7:00 pm, ESPN+		at Harvard	L 72–77 ^{OT}	13–10 (5–7)	Lavietes Pavilion (1,112); Allston, MA
February 26, 2022; 2:00 pm, ESPN+		Yale	W 71–65	14–10 (6–7)	Newman Arena (0); Ithaca, NY
March 5, 2022; 4:00 pm, ESPN+		at Columbia	W 78–65	15–10 (7–7)	Levien Gymnasium (1,823); New York, NY
Ivy League tournament
March 12, 2022; 11:00 am, ESPNU	(4)	vs. (1) Princeton; Semifinals	L 73–77	15–11	Lavietes Pavilion; Boston, MA
*Non-conference game. ^{#}Rankings from AP Poll. (#) Tournament seedings in parentheses. All times are in Eastern.
