= E3G =

Global climate change think tank (2004-)

- Established: 2004

E3G (Third Generation Environmentalism) is a climate change think tank operating to accelerate a global transition to a low-carbon future. The organisation has staff based in Brussels, Berlin, London and Washington, D.C..

== Organisation ==
E3G stands for Third Generation Environmentalism. The idea behind the name is that the first generation of environmentalists focused on the conservation of species and habitats, the second generation widened the scope to include pollution and natural resources and the third generation is building on this success, working on solutions rather than problems.

E3G has three co-founding directors, Nick Mabey, co-CEO, Shane Tomlinson, co-CEO, and Tom Burke, who is the current Chairman.

The organisation works across a number of areas including climate diplomacy, energy, finance, cities, risk, efficiency and infrastructure.

== History ==
E3G was established in 2004, when it played a pivotal role in the successful diplomatic effort to get Russia to ratify the Kyoto Protocol. In 2006, E3G developed a political analysis called Europe in the World, looking at how the EU could best respond to the challenge of maintaining its prosperity and security in an interdependent world.

E3G created the Transform UK coalition in 2009, serving as a cross-sector platform to drive green investment in the UK and spearhead the Green Investment Bank campaign. The Green Investment Bank was created to support low carbon infrastructure. The bank was established in 2011 with £3 billion in initial equity, taking on full legal status in 2013.

In 2010, together with partners, E3G developed and piloted the concept of Low Carbon Zones in China. This led to the Chinese government establishing 12 zones, covering 350 million people.

The groundbreaking Degrees of Risk report on climate risk management was published in 2011. The report went on to influence the US Interagency Climate Change Adaptation Taskforce. Members of the group have also condemned US climate rhetoric that is religious in nature and which has made its way into discussions in the UK.

The Energy Bill Revolution was launched the following year in 2012. The campaign set up a coalition of over 200 organisations calling on the UK government to recycle carbon taxes to make all UK fuel poor homes super energy efficient.

In the same year, E3G helped to launch the Norstec coalition, an industrial alliance working together on offshore renewable energy in Europe's North Sea. The North Sea Grid project is a great example of achieving power sector decarbonisation at the regional level.

In 2018 E3G proposed to the Mayor of London that he should support the first ever London Climate Action Week (LCAW 2019), held from 1–8 July 2019. Well over 100 events took place, showcasing London based organisations’ global expertise and action on climate change solutions and aims to mobilise London’s world-class cultural institutions and diverse communities around new ways to inspire and motivate climate action.

In 2021, E3G described the United Kingdom government's decision not to release the calculations underpinning its official Net Zero Strategy as smacking of "secrecy and subterfuge" and voiced concern that the interested public would not be able to scrutinize the estimated impacts of the measures under consideration. New Scientist magazine formally appealed the decision to withhold that information.

== Recognition ==
In 2020, the University of Pennsylvania's Global Go To Think Tank Index Report ranked E3G seventh in top environment policy think tanks.

== See also ==
- Politics of climate change
