= Royal Grammar School, Newcastle upon Tyne =

Selective British independent school

Royal Grammar School
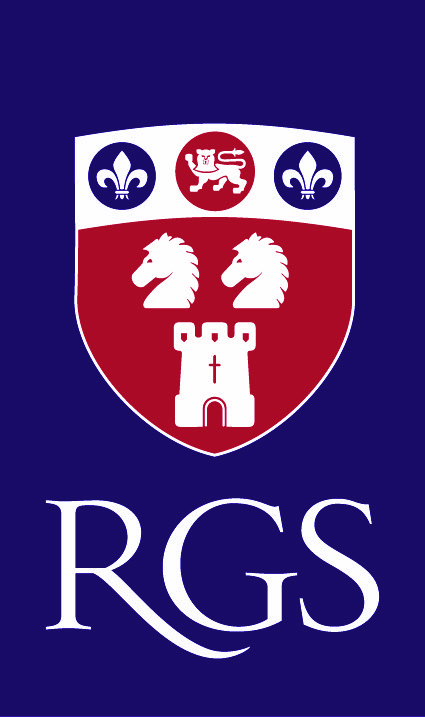

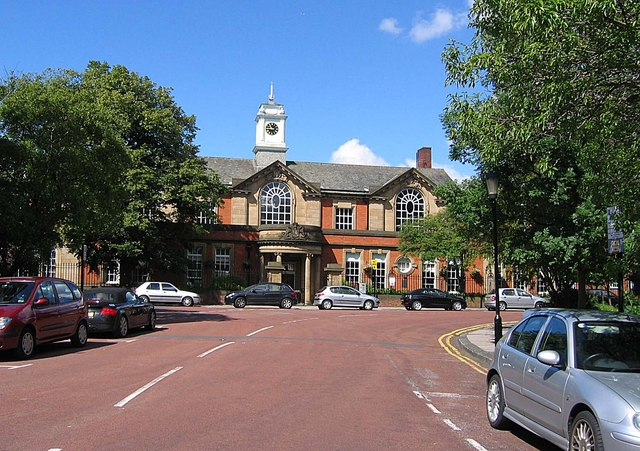

Location
- Eskdale Terrace; Newcastle upon Tyne, NE2 4DX; England; 54.982896°N 1.608864°W

Information
- Type: Grammar School; Private day school
- Motto: Latin: Discendo Duces (By Learning, You Will Lead)
- Established: 1525; 501 years ago
- Founder: Thomas Horsley
- Department for Education URN: 108549 Tables
- Head: Geoffrey Stanford
- Staff: 157
- Gender: Coeducational
- Enrolment: 1,323
- Houses: Collingwood, Eldon, Horsley, Stowell
- Alumni: Old Novocastrians
- Website: www.rgs.newcastle.sch.uk

The Royal Grammar School (RGS), Newcastle upon Tyne, is a coeducational private day school for pupils aged between 7 and 18 years. Founded in 1525 by Thomas Horsley, the Mayor of Newcastle upon Tyne, it received royal foundation by Queen Elizabeth I and is the city's oldest institution of learning. It is one of seven schools in the United Kingdom to bear the name "Royal Grammar School", of which two others are part of the independent sector.

The school is located in Jesmond, Newcastle upon Tyne, in North East England, and is a member of the Headmasters' and Headmistresses' Conference. In 2008, RGS became fully co-educational after nearly 500 years as an all boys' school. Former students are known as Old Novocastrians or Old Novos ("Novocastrian" is macaronic Latin for "citizen of Newcastle").

In 2023, 2024, 2025 and 2026, the Sunday Times Schools Guide named RGS the top performing school in the North of England based on academic results from A-levels and GCSEs.

The school's other recent accolades include; being named Independent Senior School or the Year by Tes School Awards, receiving the Artsmark Platinum Award, from Arts Council England, A-Level Platinum and GCSE Diamond Alps awards (for added value) as well as being recognised as the Best Value Independent School for the Borders and Tyne region (2026) by The Telegraph feature.

In June 2026, RGS Newcastle welcomed HRH The Duke of Edinburgh as part of the school's 500th anniversary celebrations. Students, Old Novocastrians and honoured guests spoke with The Duke as he experienced life at RGS, saw the school's charitable and partnership work first-hand and viewed The Great Charter, a powerful reminder of the school's Royal heritage, kindly loaned to RGS by Tyne and Wear Archives.

== History ==
The RGS was founded in 1525 by Thomas Horsley, within the grounds of St Nicholas' Church, Newcastle. Planning is believed to have begun as early as 1477. The school has moved site five times since then, most recently to Jesmond in 1906. The new school building, designed by Sir Edward Cooper, was officially opened on 17 January 1907 by the 7th Duke of Northumberland.

An 1868 description reads:

There are many public schools, the principal one being the Royal Free Grammar school founded in 1525 by Thomas Horsley, Mayor of Newcastle, and made a royal foundation by Queen Elizabeth. It is held in the old hall of St. Mary's Hospital, built in the reign of James I., and has an income from endowment of about £500, besides a share in Bishop Crew's 12 exhibitions at Lincoln College, Oxford, lately abolished, and several exhibitions to Cambridge. The number of scholars is about 140. Hugh Moises, and Dawes, author of "Miscellanea Critica," were once head-masters, and many celebrated men have ranked among its pupils, including W. Elstob, Bishop Ridley, Mark Akenside, the poet, Chief Justice Chambers, Brand, the antiquary and town historian, Horsley, the antiquary, and Lords Eldon, Stowell, and Collingwood.

George III, on reading one of Admiral Collingwood's despatches after Trafalgar, asked how the seaman had learned to write such splendid English, but he answered himself, recalling that, along with Eldon and Stowell, he had been a pupil of Hugh Moises: "I forgot. He was one of Moises' boys."

For the duration of the Second World War the school was evacuated en masse to Penrith, Cumbria, where a special train carrying staff and around 800 pupils arrived on 1 September 1939. Meanwhile, the main school building was transformed into the Regional War Room, which undertook the vital strategic role of collating details of air raids across the region and passing these on to RAF Fighter Command. Several rudimentary air raid shelters were built above ground for military personnel, which although substantial enough to survive as store rooms until the end of the century would have offered little protection, even from an indirect hit. The school was one of several places in Newcastle upon Tyne where a small supply of ammunition to be used in the event of a German invasion was stored.

== Student life ==
RGS campus

=== Organisation ===
Throughout the school (years 3–13) are four houses, named Collingwood (yellow), Eldon (green), Horsley (blue) and Stowell (red), although the junior school previously had separate houses, named after colours (red, white, and blue).

There are 91 members of teaching staff in the senior school including the headmaster, Geoffrey Stanford. In the junior school there are 16 members of the teaching staff, including the junior school headmaster, James Miller.

=== Clubs and societies ===
The RGS has Combined Cadet Force (CCF) Army, Navy and RAF contingents, open to both boys and girls. Cadets have weekly training sessions after school, and opportunities to go on extended training and adventure trips during the holidays. The Army section of NRGS CCF is affiliated to the Royal Regiment of Fusiliers, and the Navy Section is affiliated to HMS Calliope, a stone frigate which is situated on the Tyne next to the Baltic Art Gallery.

In 2004 the school hosted the first Northern Junior Debating Championship, which has now become an annual competition. The school's debating society also regularly enters teams for other competitions, and has reached the finals' day of both the Oxford Union and Cambridge Union schools' competitions in recent years, winning the Cambridge Union competition in 2010. At a junior level, RGS won the Northern Junior Debating Competition in 2005, 2006, 2010 and 2014.

The primary sports that are played at RGS are rugby, hockey, fencing, football, netball, cricket, swimming, and athletics.

In 2025, the VEX Robotics team qualified for the VEX Robotics World Championships in Dallas, Texas.

=== Magazines ===
The school magazine, Novo, comes out annually. A student-run newspaper, the Issue, came into being in the late 1990s; after a period of inactivity, it was relaunched as the re-Issue in September 2003. It ran roughly twice per term until its demise in summer 2005, but was replaced in early 2006 by The Grammar. At the end of the 2009–2010 academic year, The Grammar folded. In 2011 a new magazine called Vox was set up but is currently out of print. In 2017, an online group RGmemeS came into being. It is currently inactive.

== Buildings and grounds ==
The RGS is located opposite the Newcastle Prep School, and close to Newcastle High School for Girls, a single-sex girls' school formed through the merger of the Central High and Church High girls' schools.

The RGS's main buildings are in a complex located on Eskdale Terrace, Jesmond, Newcastle upon Tyne. The school hall houses an organ donated by Sir Arthur Sutherland to commemorate the 138 former pupils who were killed during the First World War.

In 1996, a new Sports' Hall containing basketball courts and updated gymnastics facilities was opened. The building also provides facilities for table tennis, fencing, and weight-training, plus a gymnasium and climbing wall.

In 1997, Professor Richard Dawkins opened the new Science and Technology Centre (STC), with Physics and Design & Technology laboratories downstairs, and Chemistry and Biology laboratories upstairs. In 2003 the STC was renamed The Neil Goldie Centre in memory of Neil Goldie, who died earlier that year. At the time he was the school's Head of Science and Technology.

In 2005, the music and economics block was demolished. A new Performing Arts Centre and Modern Languages department was completed in September 2006. It includes a 300-seat auditorium, named the "Miller Theater" in memory of former headmaster James Miller, for school concerts and productions, a musical recital hall, a drama/dance studio, recording facilities, a band room, a percussion room, and a number of classrooms.

A floodlit all-weather surface has been in use since January 2006, on land that once was part of the school field. Aside from the school field, which is primarily used for rugby union, the school also owns land in nearby Jesmond for sports use. This was given to the school in recompense for the land it lost when the flyover was created at the top of the school – eating into some of the land owned by the school. The school is also the landlords of Sutherland Park in Benton. Sutherland Park is named after Arthur Sutherland (1878–1883), who bought the grounds of Benton Lodge in 1925 for Novocastrians Rugby Football Club. The ground and clubhouse was sold to the school at a later date. The club was set up by former pupils of the school in 1899; many Old Novos still represent and play for the club to this day. The school has also recently agreed a 50-year lease of the County Cricket Ground on Osborne Avenue, Jesmond.

In October 2015, the school was the team base for the Scottish national rugby union team during the 2015 Rugby World Cup.

In October 2019 a new library, art facilities and pastoral care centre, was opened. In addition, the school also redeveloped the sixth form area, which opened in January 2020.

The West Gate Road site in 1810

The Rye Hill site in 1885

== Notable alumni ==
Former pupils (Note: For a complete list of students up to 1954 see Stevens, Bryan Dodd (1955). Register of the Royal Grammar School, Newcastle upon Tyne, 1545-1954. Gateshead: Northumberland Press. OCLC 562307197.) are known as Old Novocastrians, which is also a demonym for a person from Newcastle upon Tyne.

=== 16th century ===
- Nicholas Ridley (died 16 October 1555), English clergyman and Protestant martyr
- Thomas Brandling (1512–1590), founder of the Brandling land and coal owning dynasty

=== 17th century ===
- Brian Walton (1600–1661), English divine and scholar
- Colonel Robert Lilburne (1613–1665), regicide
- John Lilburne (1614–1657), "Freeborn John"
- William Elstob (1674?–1715), Anglo-Saxon scholar and Church of England clergyman
- Henry Bourne (1694–1733), historian

=== 18th century ===
- John Horsley (c. 1685–1732), archaeologist
- Mark Akenside (1721–1770), 18th century English poet and physician
- Anthony Askew (1722–1774), physician and book collector
- Sir Robert Chambers (1737–1803), jurist, Vinerian Professor of English Law, and Chief Justice of Bengal
- Charles Hutton (1737–1823), mathematician
- John Brand (1744–1806), 18th century English historian
- William Scott, 1st Baron Stowell (1745–1836), English judge and jurist
- Cuthbert Collingwood, 1st Baron Collingwood (1750–1810), Admiral Lord Collingwood of Trafalgar fame
- John Scott, 1st Earl of Eldon (1751–1838), Lord High Chancellor of Great Britain
- George Hall, Bishop of Dromore (1753–1811)
- John Adamson (1787–1855), antiquary and Portuguese scholar
- John Bigge (1780–1843), English judge and royal commissioner
- Thomas Addison (1793–1860), 19th-century English physician and scientist

=== 19th century ===
- Albany Hancock (1806–1873), zoologist
- John Hancock (1808–1890), father of modern taxidermy
- Sir William George Armstrong, 1st Baron Armstrong, (1810–1900), industrialist
- John Forster (1812–1876), biographer, critic and lunacy commissioner
- William Loftus (1820–1858), discoverer of Uruk
- Richard Austin Bastow (1839–1920), Australian naturalist and bryologist
- George Swinburne (1861–1928) Australian engineer, politician and public man
- Robert Burns Dick (1868–1954), architect, city planner and artist
- Sir Arthur Sutherland (1867–1953), industrialist and politician
- Tod Slaughter (1885–1956), actor
- Edward Clark (1888–1962), conductor and BBC music producer
- John Brass (colliery manager) (1879–1961), President of the Institution of Mining Engineers, assessor at the Gresford disaster inquiry
- Ronald Hall (1895–1975), Anglican bishop

=== 20th century ===
- Samuel Segal, Baron Segal, (1902–1985), Physician, Labour Party politician and Deputy Speaker of the House of Lords
- Lúcio Costa (1902–1998), Brazilian architect, designer of the Pilot Plan of Brasília
- Sir Douglas Macfadyen, KCB CBE (1902–1968) Air Officer Commanding-in-Chief at RAF Home Command
- Sir Harry Livermore(1908- 1989) Lawyer and Lord Mayor of Liverpool
- Arthur Blenkinsop (1911–1979), British Labour Party politician
- Sir Richard Southern (1912–2001), historian
- Denys Hay (1915–1994), historian
- Eric Saint (1918–1989), physician and professor of medicine
- George Gale (1927–1990), political journalist
- Brian Redhead (1929–1994), presenter of BBC Radio 4's Today (1975–1993)
- Derek Williams (1929–2021), filmmaker and historian
- Peter Taylor, Baron Taylor of Gosforth (1930–1997), Lord Chief Justice (1992–96)
- Sir Geoffrey Bindman (b. 1933), lawyer
- Professor Sir George Alberti (b. 1937), President of the Royal College of Physicians (1997–2002)
- Steven Lukes (born 1941), Social and political theorist
- Sir Alistair Graham (b. 1942), Chairman of the Committee on Standards in Public Life
- Jeremy Beecham, Baron Beecham (b. 1944), Politician
- Timothy Kirkhope (born 1945), Baron Kirkhope of Harrogate 2016, Former MEP 1999–2016, and MP 1987–97. Lawyer.
- Peter Kellner (born 1946), journalist
- Nik Cohn (born 1946), rock journalist
- Paul Torday (1946–2013), author
- Professor Sir Ian Gilmore (b. 1947), President of the Royal College of Physicians (2006–2011)
- Sir Derek Wanless (1947–2012), banker, government adviser, author of reports on health and social care
- Sir Greg Winter CBE FMedSci FRS (b. 1951), Nobel Prize laureate and Master of Trinity College, Cambridge
- Gareth A. Morris (born 1954), chemist
- John Harle (born 1956), saxophonist and composer
- John Ashton (born 1956), diplomat
- Jim Pollock (born 1958) Scottish International, Barbarian FC and Novocastrians Captain
- Ian Lucas (born 1960), MP
- Andrew Parker (born 1962), Director-General of the British Security Service (MI5)
- Peter Coles (born 1963), theoretical cosmologist
- Jonathan Webb (born 1963), England rugby International
- Max Hill QC (born 1964), Director of Public Prosecutions, Crown Prosecution Service
- Bharat Nalluri (born 1964), Television Director
- Paul W. Franks (born 1964), Professor of Philosophy and Judaic Studies, Yale University
- Paul W. S. Anderson (born 1965), Film Director
- Nick Brownlee (born 1967), crime thriller writer
- Simon Johnson (born 1970), cricketer
- Rhodri Talfan Davies (born 1971), Director of BBC Cymru
- Alastair Leithead (born 1972), BBC Journalist
- Caspar Berry (born 1974), professional poker player, screenwriter, actor and television presenter on Poker Night Live
- Nicky Peng (born 1982), English cricketer
- Matthew Thompson (born 1982), English & Newcastle Falcons RFU player
- Mark Wallace (born 1984), political journalist
- Fraser Forster (born 1988), professional footballer (goalkeeper) with Southampton
- Will Welch (born 1990), professional rugby player with Newcastle Falcons
- Daniel Young (born 1990), cricketer
- Tom Machell (born 1990) Actor and Writer
- Joel Hodgson (born 1992), professional rugby union player with Newcastle Falcons
- Abigail Thorn (born 1993), YouTuber, actress and playwright
- Tom Penny (born 1994), professional rugby union player with Newcastle Falcons
- Will Nicholls (born 1995), wildlife cameraman
- Kate Waugh (born 1999), British Triathlete

=== 21st century ===
- Phil Brantingham (born 2001), professional rugby union player with Newcastle Falcons

== Notable staff ==
- James Jurin, Head Master 1709–1715
- Richard Dawes, Head Master 1738–1749
- Hugh Moises, Head Master 1749–1806
- George Ferris Whidborne Mortimer, Head Master 1828–1833
- Max Black, Head of Mathematics 1931–1936
- Michael Roberts, Mathematics 1931–1941; published poet
- John Elders, Sports Master 1957–1982 and 1992–1996; England Rugby Head Coach
- William Feaver, History and Art 1965–1971; author and published art historian
- Jim Pollock, Sports Master (Rugby) 2002–2019; Scotland Rugby International

== See also ==
- List of the oldest schools in the United Kingdom
- List of Old Novocastrians with articles on Wikipedia
- List of mayors of Newcastle upon Tyne
