= 2025–26 Drexel Dragons men's basketball team =

American college basketball season

2025–26 Drexel Dragons men's basketball
- Conference: Coastal Athletic Association
- Record: 17–16 (10–8 CAA)
- Head coach: Zach Spiker (10th season)
- Assistant coaches: Paul Fortier (10th season); Will Chavis (5th season); Frantz Massenat (3rd season); Tim Brooks (1st season)
- Home arena: Daskalakis Athletic Center

2025–26 CAA men's basketball standings
	Conf.				Overall
Team	W		L	PCT	W		L	PCT
UNC Wilmington	15	–	3	.833	27	–	7	.794
Charleston	14	–	4	.778	21	–	11	.656
Hofstra †	12	–	6	.667	24	–	11	.686
Monmouth	11	–	7	.611	19	–	15	.559
Drexel	10	–	8	.556	17	–	16	.515
William & Mary	10	–	8	.556	20	–	12	.625
Towson	9	–	9	.500	19	–	15	.559
Stony Brook	9	–	9	.500	17	–	15	.531
Campbell	8	–	10	.444	16	–	18	.471
Hampton	7	–	11	.389	13	–	19	.406
Elon	6	–	12	.333	14	–	18	.438
North Carolina A&T	4	–	14	.222	11	–	19	.367
Northeastern	2	–	16	.111	7	–	24	.226
† 2026 CAA tournament winner

The 2025–26 Drexel Dragons men's basketball team represented Drexel University during the 2025–26 NCAA Division I men's basketball season. The Dragons, led by tenth-year head coach Zach Spiker, played their home games at the Daskalakis Athletic Center in Philadelphia, Pennsylvania as members of the Coastal Athletic Association (CAA).

== Previous season ==
The Dragons finished the 2024–25 season 18–15, 9–9 in CAA play, to finish in eighth place. They lost to Towson in the CAA tournament quarterfinals.

== Offseason ==
=== Departures ===
Departures
Name	No.	Pos.	Height	Weight	Year	Hometown	Reason for departure
Kobe MaGee	5	G	6'6"	195	Junior	Allentown, PA	Transferred to Florida State
Jason Drake	11	G	6'2"	185	Junior	Oak Park, MI	Transferred to Indiana
Cole Hargrove	15	F	6'8"	235	Junior	Norristown, PA	Transferred to Providence
Yame Butler	23	F	6'5"	215	5th-year senior	Greenbelt, MD	Transferred to Butler

=== Incoming transfers ===
College recruiting
Name	Hometown	School	Height	Weight	Commit date
Dillon Tingler; G	Hurricane, WV	Eastern Michigan	6 ft 7 in (2.01 m)	185 lb (84 kg)	Apr 28, 2025
Dillon Tingler; G	Recruit ratings: 247Sports: ESPN: (78)				
Martin de Laporterie; F	Bordeaux, France	Yavapai College	7 ft 1 in (2.16 m)	210 lb (95 kg)	May 8, 2025
Martin de Laporterie; F	Recruit ratings: No ratings found				
Moses Hipps; G	Voorhees, NJ	Boise State	6 ft 4 in (1.93 m)	170 lb (77 kg)	May 20, 2025
Moses Hipps; G	Recruit ratings: Rivals: 247Sports: On3: ESPN: (78)				
Eli Beard; G	Big Sandy, TX	Mary Hardin–Baylor	5 ft 11 in (1.80 m)	160 lb (73 kg)	Jun 26, 2025
Eli Beard; G	Recruit ratings: No ratings found				
Overall recruit ranking:
Note: In many cases, Scout, Rivals, 247Sports, On3, and ESPN may conflict in their listings of height and weight.; In these cases, the average was taken. ESPN grades are on a 100-point scale.; Sources: "Drexel 2025 Basketball Commitments". Rivals.; "Drexel Dragons". ESPN.; "2025 Team Ranking". Rivals.; "Drexel 2025 Basketball Commits". 247Sports.

=== Recruiting class ===
==== 2025 recruiting class ====
College recruiting
Name	Hometown	School	Height	Weight	Commit date
Ignaio Campoy Galvez; F	Madrid, Spain		6 ft 7 in (2.01 m)	210 lb (95 kg)	Sep 4, 2025
Ignaio Campoy Galvez; F	Recruit ratings: No ratings found				
Overall recruit ranking:
Note: In many cases, Scout, Rivals, 247Sports, On3, and ESPN may conflict in their listings of height and weight.; In these cases, the average was taken. ESPN grades are on a 100-point scale.; Sources: "Drexel 2025 Basketball Commitments". Rivals.; "Drexel Dragons". ESPN.; "2025 Team Ranking". Rivals.; "Drexel 2025 Basketball Commits". 247Sports.

==== 2026 recruiting class ====
College recruiting (2026)
Name	Hometown	School	Height	Weight	Commit date
Latief Lorenzano-White; SF	Philadelphia, PA	Imhotep Institute Charter High School	6 ft 5 in (1.96 m)	N/A	Sep 25, 2025
Latief Lorenzano-White; SF	Recruit ratings: No ratings found				
B.J. Brown; SG	Sumter, SC	Sumter High School	6 ft 5 in (1.96 m)	N/A	Sep 29, 2025
B.J. Brown; SG	Recruit ratings: No ratings found				
Tre Paulding; SG	Lee's Summit, MO	Lee's Summit North High School	6 ft 5 in (1.96 m)	200 lb (91 kg)	Oct 2, 2025
Tre Paulding; SG	Recruit ratings: On3:				
Overall recruit ranking:
Note: In many cases, Scout, Rivals, 247Sports, On3, and ESPN may conflict in their listings of height and weight.; In these cases, the average was taken. ESPN grades are on a 100-point scale.; Sources: "Drexel 2026 Basketball Commitments". Rivals.; "Drexel Dragons". ESPN.; "2026 Team Ranking". Rivals.; "Drexel 2026 Basketball Commits". 247Sports.; "2026 Drexel Dragons Basketball Commits". On3.

== Preseason ==
In a poll of the league coaches at the CAA's media day, Drexel was picked to finish in tenth place in the CAA.

== Roster ==
2025–26 Drexel Dragons men's basketball team
Players
Coaches

Pos.	#	Name	Height	Weight	Year	Previous school	Hometown
F	00	Horace Simmons	6 ft 6 in (1.98 m)	215 lb (98 kg)	RS So	La Salle College HS	Glenside, PA
F	1	Victor Panov	6 ft 7 in (2.01 m)	230 lb (104 kg)	Sr	DME Academy/Daytona State	Saint Petersburg, Russia
G	2	Moses Hipps	6 ft 4 in (1.93 m)	180 lb (82 kg)	RS Fr	AZ Compass Prep/Boise State	Voorhees, NJ
G	3	Kevon Vanderhorst	6 ft 2 in (1.88 m)	180 lb (82 kg)	Jr	Trinity Academy (NC)/Brunswick CC	Raleigh, NC
G	4	Shane Blakeney	6 ft 5 in (1.96 m)	200 lb (91 kg)	RS Jr	Legion Collegiate Academy	Rock Hill, SC
G	5	Josh Reed	6 ft 2 in (1.88 m)	200 lb (91 kg)	So	Archbishop Wood HS	Wyndmoor, PA
F	6	Clem Edomwonyin	6 ft 9 in (2.06 m)	225 lb (102 kg)	So	London Academy	East London, England
G	7	Eli Beard	5 ft 11 in (1.8 m)	160 lb (73 kg)		Big Sandy HS/Mary Hardin–Baylor	Big Sandy, TX
F	11	Martin de Laporterie	7 ft 1 in (2.16 m)	210 lb (95 kg)	Jr	Central Pointe/Yavapai College	Bordeaux, France
F	13	Garfield Turner	6 ft 8 in (2.03 m)	250 lb (113 kg)	RS Sr	Mt. Zion Prep/Odessa	Gaithersburg, MD
G	22	Villiam Garcia Adsten	6 ft 8 in (2.03 m)	225 lb (102 kg)	Jr	Korrespondensgymnasiet	Stockholm, Sweden
G	23	Dillon Tingler	6 ft 7 in (2.01 m)	175 lb (79 kg)	So	Huntington Prep/Eastern Michigan	Hurricane, WV
F	24	Ignaio Campoy Galvez	6 ft 7 in (2.01 m)	210 lb (95 kg)	Fr		Madrid, Spain
G	25	Max Davis (W)	6 ft 4 in (1.93 m)	200 lb (91 kg)	RS Jr	IMG Academy	New York, NY
C	33	Ralph Akuta	7 ft 1 in (2.16 m)	285 lb (129 kg)	So	Hargrave Military Academy	Ijamsville, MD

Head coach

- Zach Spiker (Ithaca)

Assistant coach(es)

- Paul Fortier (Washington)
- Will Chavis (Texas Tech)
- Frantz Massenat (Drexel)
- Tim Brooks (James Madison)

Legend

- (C) Team captain
- (S) Suspended
- (I) Ineligible
- (W) Walk-on
- Injured
- Current redshirt

Roster
Last update: July 10, 2025

== Schedule and results ==
Date time, TV	Rank^{#}	Opponent^{#}	Result	Record	High points	High rebounds	High assists	Site (attendance) city, state
Exhibition
October 28, 2025; 6:00 pm		Lafayette	W 73–65		–	–	–	Daskalakis Athletic Center; Philadelphia, PA
Non-conference regular season
November 3, 2025*; 6:00 pm, FloHoops		Widener	W 93–59	1–0	17 – Reed	12 – Reed	6 – Vanderhorst	Daskalakis Athletic Center (1,039); Philadelphia, PA
November 8, 2025*; 1:00 pm, ESPN+		at Saint Joseph's; Big 5 Classic Pod 1	L 65–76	1–1	12 – Garcia Adsten	11 – Garcia Adsten	3 – Blakeney	Hagan Arena (2,401); Philadelphia, PA
November 11, 2025*; 7:00 pm, ESPN+		at Colgate	L 83–90	1–2	24 – Tied	9 – de Laporterie	4 – Tied	Cotterell Court (643); Hamilton, NY
November 15, 2025*; 3:30 pm, Peacock		vs. Syracuse	L 50–80	1–3	13 – Beard	6 – Tied	5 – Vanderhorst	Xfinity Mobile Arena (5,768); Philadelphia, PA
November 18, 2025*; 7:00 pm, NBCSPHI		NJIT	W 75–43	2–3	13 – Tied	9 – Blakeney	4 – Tied	Daskalakis Athletic Center (802); Philadelphia, PA
November 21, 2025*; 7:00 pm, NBCSPHI		Penn; Big 5 Classic Pod 1, Battle of 33rd Street	L 68–84	2–4	21 – Reed	7 – Turner	4 – Vanderhorst	Daskalakis Athletic Center (1,984); Philadelphia, PA
November 23, 2025*; 2:00 pm, FloHoops		Old Dominion	W 75–71	3–4	18 – Reed	10 – Garcia Adsten	4 – Garcia Adsten	Daskalakis Athletic Center (767); Philadelphia, PA
November 25, 2025*; 6:00 pm		at Morgan State	W 71–66	4–4	15 – Beard	10 – Garcia Adsten	4 – Blakeney	Hill Field House (397); Baltimore, MD
December 3, 2025*; 7:00 pm, ESPN+		at American	L 73–75	4–5	22 – Blakeney	11 – Garcia Adsten	3 – Tied	Bender Arena (1,065); Washington, D.C.
December 6, 2025*; 2:00 pm, NBCSPHI		vs. La Salle; Big 5 Classic 5th-place game	L 64–69	4–6	12 – Turner	8 – Tied	3 – Tied	Xfinity Mobile Arena; Philadelphia, PA
December 16, 2025*; 11:00 am, NBCSPHI		Howard	L 66–74	4–7	30 – Vanderhorst	6 – Garcia Adsten	4 – Tied	Daskalakis Athletic Center (1,954); Philadelphia, PA
December 19, 2025*; 7:00 pm, NBCSPHI		Mount St. Mary's	W 75−67	5−7	16 – Panov	7 – Panov	6 – Blakeney	Daskalakis Athletic Center (748); Philadelphia, PA
December 21, 2025*; 2:00 pm, NBCSPHI		Maine	W 74–56	6–7	19 – Panov	5 – Beard	6 – Vanderhorst	Daskalakis Athletic Center (796); Philadelphia, PA
CAA regular season
December 29, 2025; 7:00 pm, FloHoops		at College of Charleston	L 63–72	6–8 (0–1)	17 – Beard	9 – Blakeney	3 – Vanderhorst	TD Arena (5,234); Charleston, SC
December 31, 2025; 7:00 pm, FloHoops		at UNC Wilmington	L 53–65	6–9 (0–2)	14 – Beard	8 – Panov	3 – Vanderhorst	Trask Coliseum (5,038); Wilmington, NC
January 3, 2026; 2:00 pm, FloHoops		Hofstra	L 67–70	6–10 (0–3)	18 – Blakeney	5 – Tied	3 – Tied	Daskalakis Athletic Center (882); Philadelphia, PA
January 8, 2026; 7:00 pm, FloHoops		Stony Brook	W 56–37	7–10 (1–3)	13 – Tingler	8 – Tied	4 – Beard	Daskalakis Athletic Center (936); Philadelphia, PA
January 10, 2026; 2:00 pm, FloHoops		William & Mary	W 64–58	8–10 (2–3)	13 – Tied	10 – Panov	5 – Blakeney	Daskalakis Athletic Center (1,011); Philadelphia, PA
January 15, 2026; 7:00 pm, FloHoops		at Monmouth	W 73–51	9–10 (3–3)	18 – Blakeney	9 – Turner	6 – Vanderhorst	OceanFirst Bank Center (1,196); West Long Branch, NJ
January 19, 2026; 1:00 pm, CBSSN		at Towson	L 58–59	9–11 (3–4)	16 – Blakeney	4 – Tied	3 – Adsten	SECU Arena (3,188); Towson, MD
January 24, 2026; 2:00 pm, FloHoops		Northeastern	W 83–78	10–11 (4–4)	22 – Reed	5 – Tied	4 – Tied	Daskalakis Athletic Center (2,002); Philadelphia, PA
January 29, 2026; 7:00 pm, FloHoops		Hampton	L 51–58	11–11 (5–4)	14 – Reed	6 – Vanderhorst	4 – Vanderhorst	Daskalakis Athletic Center (917); Philadelphia, PA
January 31, 2026; 2:00 pm, FloHoops		North Carolina A&T	W 61–60	12–11 (6–4)	19 – Blakeney	9 – Blakeney	5 – Vanderhorst	Daskalakis Athletic Center (1,277); Philadelphia, PA
February 5, 2026; 7:00 pm, FloHoops		at Campbell	L 60–81	12–12 (6–5)	15 – Blakeney	5 – Blakeney	3 – Panov	Gore Arena (1,336); Buies Creek, NC
February 7, 2026; 12:00 pm, CBSSN		at Elon	W 82–77	13–12 (7–5)	16 – Beard	12 – Turner	3 – Tied	Schar Center (2,021); Elon, NC
February 12, 2026; 7:00 pm, FloHoops		Monmouth	L 73–93	13–13 (7–6)	19 – Tingler	3 – Blakenley	4 – Blakenley	Daskalakis Athletic Center (1,363); Philadelphia, PA
February 16, 2026; 8:00 pm, CBSSN		at Stony Brook	L 69–72	13–14 (7–7)	14 – Blakeney	7 – Panov	4 – Blakeney	Stony Brook Arena (2,530); Stony Brook, NY
February 19, 2026; 7:00 pm, FloHoops		at Northeastern	W 70–61	14–14 (8–7)	19 – Panov	7 – Panov	5 – Panov	Cabot Center (812); Boston, MA
February 22, 2026; 2:00 pm, CBSSN		Towson	W 68–62	15–14 (9–7)	24 – Blakeney	13 – Turner	2 – Tied	Daskalakis Athletic Center (1,237); Philadelphia, PA
February 26, 2026; 7:00 pm, FloHoops		Campbell	W 65–60	16–14 (10–7)	22 – Blakeney	6 – Tied	4 – Panov	Daskalakis Athletic Center (1,044); Philadelphia, PA
March 3, 2026; 7:00 pm, FloHoops		at Hofstra	L 51–62	16–15 (10–8)	15 – Blakeney	5 – Tied	6 – Vanderhorst	Mack Sports Complex (1,402); Hempstead, NY
CAA tournament
March 7, 2026; 2:30 pm, FloHoops	(5)	vs. (13) Northeastern; Second round	W 84–77	17–15	21 – Beard	7 – Beard	5 – Vanderhorst	CareFirst Arena (1,557); Washington, D.C.
March 8, 2026; 2:30 pm, FloHoops	(5)	vs. (4) Monmouth; Quarterfinals	L 57–65	17–16	15 – Vanderhorst	9 – Blakeney	4 – Blakeney	CareFirst Arena (1,666); Washington, D.C.
*Non-conference game. ^{#}Rankings from AP. (#) Tournament seedings in parentheses. All times are in Eastern.

== See also ==
- 2025–26 Drexel Dragons women's basketball team
