= 2025–26 Holy Cross Crusaders men's basketball team =

American college basketball season

2025–26 Holy Cross Crusaders men's basketball
- Conference: Patriot League
- Record: 11–22 (5–13 Patriot)
- Head coach: Dave Paulsen (3rd season)
- Associate head coach: Bryson Johnson
- Assistant coaches: Ted Rawlings; Sydney Armand; Colin Richey
- Home arena: Hart Center

2025–26 Patriot League men's basketball standings
	Conf.				Overall
Team	W		L	PCT	W		L	PCT
Navy	17	–	1	.944	26	–	8	.765
Lehigh †	11	–	7	.611	18	–	17	.514
Colgate	11	–	7	.611	18	–	15	.545
Boston University	10	–	8	.556	17	–	17	.500
American	9	–	9	.500	16	–	16	.500
Loyola	8	–	10	.444	12	–	20	.375
Lafayette	8	–	10	.444	11	–	21	.344
Bucknell	6	–	12	.333	10	–	23	.303
Army	5	–	13	.278	11	–	21	.344
Holy Cross	5	–	13	.278	11	–	22	.333
† 2026 Patriot League tournament winner

The 2025–26 Holy Cross Crusaders men's basketball team represented the College of the Holy Cross during the 2025–26 NCAA Division I men's basketball season. The Crusaders, led by third-year head coach Dave Paulsen, played their home games at the Hart Center in Worcester, Massachusetts as members of the Patriot League.

== Previous season ==
The Crusaders finished the 2024–25 season 13–19, 5–13 in Patriot League play, to finish in tenth (last) place. They were defeated by Lafayette in the first round of the Patriot League tournament.

== Preseason ==
On October 15, 2025, the Patriot League released their preseason poll. Holy Cross was picked to finish ninth in the conference.

=== Preseason rankings ===
Patriot League Preseason Poll
Place	Team	Points
1	Navy	79 (7)
2	Boston University	73 (2)
3	Colgate	64 (1)
4	American	47
5	Bucknell	44
6	Loyola (MD)	39
7	Lafayette	36
8	Lehigh	30
9	Holy Cross	23
10	Army	15
(#) first-place votes

=== Preseason All-Patriot League Team ===
No players were named to the Preseason All-Patriot League Team.

== Roster ==
2025–26 Holy Cross Crusaders men's basketball team
Players
Coaches

Pos.	#	Name	Height	Weight	Year	Previous school	Hometown
G	0	Tyler Boston	6 ft 0 in (1.83 m)	185 lb (84 kg)	So	Bullis School	Severn, Maryland
F	1	Will Aljancic	6 ft 6 in (1.98 m)	220 lb (100 kg)	Jr	Findlay	Louisville, Ohio
G	2	DeAndre Williams	6 ft 3 in (1.91 m)	195 lb (88 kg)	Jr	St. Benedict's Prep	Beacon, New York
G	3	Ben Capron	6 ft 0 in (1.83 m)	168 lb (76 kg)	Sr	Phillipsburg High School	Phillipsburg, New Jersey
G	4	John St. Germain III	6 ft 1 in (1.85 m)	192 lb (87 kg)	Jr	Augusta	Charlottesville, Virginia
G	5	Jaden Kirkwood	6 ft 5 in (1.96 m)	232 lb (105 kg)	Sr	IMG Academy	Ottawa, Ontario
G/F	11	Jude Haigh	6 ft 5 in (1.96 m)	195 lb (88 kg)	Fr	Green Canyon High School	Altoona, Pennsylvania
F	12	Aiden Disu	6 ft 7 in (2.01 m)	215 lb (98 kg)	Fr	St. Michael's Prep	Buda, Texas
F	15	Tim Finau	6 ft 11 in (2.11 m)	235 lb (107 kg)	Fr	Athletes in Action Prep	Dallas, Texas
G/F	21	Gabe Warren	6 ft 6 in (1.98 m)	214 lb (97 kg)	Jr	Rice	Plano, Texas
F	22	Chuck Hare	6 ft 10 in (2.08 m)	235 lb (107 kg)	So	Kingswood Oxford School	Shelton, Connecticut
F	23	Aidan Richard	6 ft 6 in (1.98 m)	200 lb (91 kg)	So	Ronald Reagan High School	San Antonio, Texas
F	24	Ethan Clark	6 ft 7 in (2.01 m)	209 lb (95 kg)	Fr	Wilbraham & Monson Academy	Dartmouth, Massachusetts
G/F	30	Joe Nugent	6 ft 6 in (1.98 m)	210 lb (95 kg)	Jr	Tabor Academy	Berkley, Massachusetts
G	33	Austin Mejia	6 ft 3 in (1.91 m)	190 lb (86 kg)	So	Regis High School	Wayne, New Jersey
F	34	Declan Ryan	6 ft 8 in (2.03 m)	257 lb (117 kg)	Jr	Worcester Academy	Buffalo, New York

Head coach

- Dave Paulsen (Williams)

Assistant coach(es)

- Bryson Johnson (Bucknell)
- Ted Rawlings (Penn)
- Sydney Armand (Rhode Island)
- Colin Richey (Saint Michael's)

Legend

- (C) Team captain
- (S) Suspended
- (I) Ineligible
- (W) Walk-on
- Injured
- Current redshirt

Roster
Last update: November 27, 2025

== Schedule and results ==
Date time, TV	Rank^{#}	Opponent^{#}	Result	Record	Site (attendance) city, state
Non-conference regular season
November 3, 2025*; 7:15 pm, ESPN+		at Providence	L 79–89	0–1	Amica Mutual Pavilion (9,083); Providence, RI
November 8, 2025*; 9:00 pm, ESPN+		at No. 8 BYU	L 53–98	0–2	Marriott Center (17,918); Provo, UT
November 10, 2025*; 9:00 pm, ESPN+		at Utah	L 69–87	0–3	Jon M. Huntsman Center (6,570); Salt Lake City, UT
November 16, 2025*; 1:00 pm, ESPN+		vs. Hampton; College Hill Classic	W 67–61	1–3	Pizzitola Sports Center (225); Providence, RI
November 18, 2025*; 7:00 pm, ESPN+		at Brown; College Hill Classic	L 49–68	1–4	Pizzitola Sports Center (407); Providence, RI
November 21, 2025*; 7:00 pm, ESPN+		at Sacred Heart	L 66–79	1–5	William H. Pitt Center (974); Fairfield, CT
November 24, 2025*; 6:00 pm, ESPN+		Siena	L 69–73	1–6	Hart Center (807); Worcester, MA
November 26, 2025*; 2:00 pm, ESPN+		Worcester State	W 77–53	2–6	Hart Center (857); Worcester, MA
December 3, 2025*; 6:00 pm, ESPN+		Northeastern	W 76–59	3–6	Hart Center (831); Worcester, MA
December 6, 2025*; 2:00 pm, ESPN+		at Fordham	W 70–69	4–6	Rose Hill Gymnasium (1,262); Bronx, NY
December 9, 2025*; 6:00 pm, ESPN+		Regis	W 69–47	5–6	Hart Center (718); Worcester, MA
December 16, 2025*; 6:00 pm, ESPN+		Dartmouth	L 64–89	5–7	Hart Center (690); Worcester, MA
December 20, 2025*; 2:00 pm, ESPN+		at Harvard	L 53–81	5–8	Lavietes Pavilion (1,155); Allston, MA
Patriot League regular season
December 31, 2025; 2:00 pm, ESPN+		Bucknell	W 65–58	6–8 (1–0)	Hart Center (1,124); Worcester, MA
January 3, 2026; 2:00 pm, ESPN+		Navy	L 58–65	6–9 (1–1)	Hart Center (1,391); Worcester, MA
January 7, 2026; 6:00 pm, ESPN+		at Lehigh	L 58–66	6–10 (1–2)	Stabler Arena (473); Bethlehem, PA
January 10, 2026; 4:00 pm, ESPN+		at American	W 84–73	7–10 (2–2)	Bender Arena (2,146); Washington, D.C.
January 14, 2026; 6:00 pm, ESPN+		Army	W 82–75	8–10 (3–2)	Hart Center (689); Worcester, MA
January 17, 2026; 1:00 pm, ESPN+		at Lafayette	L 55–74	8–11 (3–3)	Kirby Sports Center (679); Easton, PA
January 21, 2026; 7:00 pm, ESPN+		at Navy	L 68–85	8–12 (3–4)	Alumni Hall (855); Annapolis, MD
January 24, 2026; 12:00 pm, ESPN+		American	L 67–76	8–13 (3–5)	Hart Center (1,026); Worcester, MA
January 28, 2026; 7:00 pm, ESPN+		at Colgate	L 74-79	8-14 (3-6)	Cotterell Court (500); Hamilton, NY
January 31, 2026; 1:00 pm, ESPN+		at Army	L 68−69	8−15 (3−7)	Christl Arena (1,165); West Point, NY
February 2, 2026; 7:00 pm, CBSSN		Boston University; Turnpike Trophy	L 64−72	8−16 (3−8)	Hart Center (2,512); Worcester, MA
February 7, 2026; 2:00 pm, ESPN+/NESN		Lehigh	W 76−67	9−16 (4−8)	Hart Center (2,917); Worcester, MA
February 11, 2026; 6:00 pm, ESPN+/NESN		Colgate	L 70−74	9−17 (4−9)	Hart Center (1,122); Worcester, MA
February 15, 2026; 1:00 pm, ESPN+		at Loyola (MD)	L 73−83	9−18 (4−10)	Reitz Arena (1,202); Baltimore, MD
February 18, 2026; 6:00 pm, ESPN+		Lafayette	L 83−86	9−19 (4−11)	Hart Center (1,086); Worcester, MA
February 22, 2026; 12:00 pm, ESPN+		at Bucknell	W 72–63	10−19 (5−11)	Sojka Pavilion (901); Lewisburg, PA
February 25, 2026; 7:00 pm, ESPN+		at Boston University; Turnpike Trophy	L 63–78	10−20 (5−12)	Case Gym (803); Boston, MA
February 28, 2026; 2:00 pm, ESPN+		Loyola (MD)	L 62–76	10−21 (5−13)	Hart Center (1,066); Worcester, MA
Patriot League tournament
March 3, 2026; 7:00 pm, ESPN+	(10)	at (7) Lafayette; First round	W 82–77	11–21	Kirby Sports Center (1,434); Easton, PA
March 5, 2026; 7:00 pm, ESPN+	(10)	at (2) Lehigh; Quarterfinals	L 66–69	11–22	Stabler Arena (1,350); Bethlehem, PA
*Non-conference game. ^{#}Rankings from AP Poll. (#) Tournament seedings in parentheses. All times are in Eastern.
