= 2025–26 Lehigh Mountain Hawks men's basketball team =

American college basketball season

2025–26 Lehigh Mountain Hawks men's basketball

Patriot League tournament champions

NCAA tournament, First Four
- Conference: Patriot League
- Record: 18–17 (11–7 Patriot)
- Head coach: Brett Reed (19th season)
- Associate head coach: Manny Adako; Brian Kennedy
- Assistant coach: Patrick Frost
- Home arena: Stabler Arena

2025–26 Patriot League men's basketball standings
| | Conf. | | | | Overall |
| Team | W | | L | PCT | W | | L | PCT |
|---|---|---|---|---|---|---|---|---|
| Navy | 17 | – | 1 | .944 | 26 | – | 8 | .765 |
| Lehigh † | 11 | – | 7 | .611 | 18 | – | 17 | .514 |
| Colgate | 11 | – | 7 | .611 | 18 | – | 15 | .545 |
| Boston University | 10 | – | 8 | .556 | 17 | – | 17 | .500 |
| American | 9 | – | 9 | .500 | 16 | – | 16 | .500 |
| Loyola | 8 | – | 10 | .444 | 12 | – | 20 | .375 |
| Lafayette | 8 | – | 10 | .444 | 11 | – | 21 | .344 |
| Bucknell | 6 | – | 12 | .333 | 10 | – | 23 | .303 |
| Army | 5 | – | 13 | .278 | 11 | – | 21 | .344 |
| Holy Cross | 5 | – | 13 | .278 | 11 | – | 22 | .333 |
† 2026 Patriot League tournament winner

The 2025–26 Lehigh Mountain Hawks men's basketball team represented Lehigh University during the 2025–26 NCAA Division I men's basketball season. The Mountain Hawks, led by 19th-year head coach Brett Reed, played their home games at Stabler Arena in Bethlehem, Pennsylvania as members of the Patriot League.

== Previous season ==
The Mountain Hawks finished the 2024–25 season 11–19, 6–12 in Patriot League play, to finish in a tie for eighth place. They would be defeated by Loyola (MD) in the first round of the Patriot League tournament.

== Preseason ==
On October 15, 2025, the Patriot League released their preseason poll. Lehigh was picked to finish eighth in the conference.

=== Preseason rankings ===
Patriot League Preseason Poll
| Place | Team | Points |
|---|---|---|
| 1 | Navy | 79 (7) |
| 2 | Boston University | 73 (2) |
| 3 | Colgate | 64 (1) |
| 4 | American | 47 |
| 5 | Bucknell | 44 |
| 6 | Loyola (MD) | 39 |
| 7 | Lafayette | 36 |
| 8 | Lehigh | 30 |
| 9 | Holy Cross | 23 |
| 10 | Army | 15 |
(#) first-place votes

=== Preseason All-Patriot League Team ===
No players were named to the Preseason All-Patriot League Team.

== Roster ==
2025–26 Lehigh Mountain Hawks men's basketball team
Players
Coaches

| Pos. | # | Name | Height | Weight | Year | Previous school | Hometown |
|---|---|---|---|---|---|---|---|
| G | 0 | Andrew Urosevic | 6 ft 3 in (1.91 m) | 195 lb (88 kg) | Fr | Northfield Mount Hermon School | Kitchener, Ontario |
| G | 1 | Nasir Whitlock (C) | 6 ft 2 in (1.88 m) | 184 lb (83 kg) | Jr | DeLaSalle High School | Brooklyn Park, Minnesota |
| G | 2 | Caesar Burrows | 6 ft 3 in (1.91 m) | 177 lb (80 kg) | Fr | Walton High School | Marietta, Georgia |
| G | 4 | Joshua Ingram | 6 ft 4 in (1.93 m) | 176 lb (80 kg) | Jr | St. Joseph High School | Fords, New Jersey |
| F | 5 | Edouard Benoit | 6 ft 8 in (2.03 m) | 207 lb (94 kg) | So | Collège Jean-de-Brébeuf | Montreal, Quebec |
| G | 10 | Caleb Thomas | 5 ft 10 in (1.78 m) | 157 lb (71 kg) | Fr | Combine Academy | Atlanta, Georgia |
| G | 11 | Brendan Reed | 6 ft 0 in (1.83 m) | 161 lb (73 kg) | Sr | Allentown Central Catholic High School | Bethlehem, Pennsylvania |
| F | 15 | Alfredo Addesa | 6 ft 10 in (2.08 m) | 235 lb (107 kg) | So | Perkiomen School | Monza, Italy |
| F | 21 | Jake Pike | 6 ft 8 in (2.03 m) | 210 lb (95 kg) | Jr | St. Thomas High School | Houston, Texas |
| F | 23 | Bube Momah | 6 ft 8 in (2.03 m) | 240 lb (109 kg) | Sr | Brewster Academy | Unionville, Connecticut |
| G | 25 | Peter Kramer | 6 ft 5 in (1.96 m) | 196 lb (89 kg) | So | Hampton High School | Allison Park, Pennsylvania |
| G | 31 | Jalen Vazquez | 6 ft 3 in (1.91 m) | 170 lb (77 kg) | Jr | Pasadena City College | Carson, California |
| C | 32 | Henri Adiassa | 6 ft 11 in (2.11 m) | 240 lb (109 kg) | Sr | Crossroads School | Yaoundé, Cameroon |
| F/C | 35 | Hank Alvey | 6 ft 9 in (2.06 m) | 251 lb (114 kg) | So | Illini Bluffs High School | Mapleton, Illinois |
| C | 44 | Tommy Conniff | 6 ft 11 in (2.11 m) | 260 lb (118 kg) | Sr | Oratory Prep | Summit, New Jersey |

Head coach

- Brett Reed (Wayne State (MI))

Assistant coach(es)

- Manny Adako (Northeastern)
- Brian Kennedy (Monmouth)
- Patrick Frost (Eastern Washington)

Legend

- (C) Team captain
- (S) Suspended
- (I) Ineligible
- (W) Walk-on
- Injured
- Current redshirt

Roster
Last update: November 25, 2025

== Schedule and results ==
| Date time, TV | Rank^{#} | Opponent^{#} | Result | Record | High points | High rebounds | High assists | Site (attendance) city, state |
Non-conference regular season
| November 3, 2025*; 8:00 pm, CBSSN | | at No. 2 Houston | L 57–75 | 0–1 | 18 – Whitlock | 9 – Whitlock | 3 – Thomas | Fertitta Center (7,035); Houston, TX |
| November 6, 2025*; 7:00 pm, ESPN+ | | Valley Forge | W 91–52 | 1–1 | 23 – Urosevic | 9 – Adiassa | 8 – Thomas | Leeman-Turner Arena (817); Bethlehem, PA |
| November 9, 2025*; 3:00 pm, ESPN+ | | at West Virginia | L 47–69 | 1–2 | 16 – Urosevic | 8 – Alvey | 3 – Alvey | Hope Coliseum (10,264); Morgantown, WV |
| November 14, 2025*; 6:30 pm, B1G+ | | at Rutgers | L 72–84 | 1–3 | 21 – Whitlock | 8 – Ingram | 4 – Tied | Jersey Mike's Arena (8,000); Piscataway, NJ |
| November 18, 2025*; 7:00 pm, ESPN+ | | Saint Francis | W 79–62 | 2–3 | 23 – Whitlock | 8 – Ingram | 4 – Tied | Stabler Arena (572); Bethlehem, PA |
| November 21, 2025*; 6:00 pm, ESPN+ | | Columbia | L 67–82 | 2–4 | 19 – Urosevic | 7 – Alvey | 3 – Ingram | Stabler Arena (612); Bethlehem, PA |
| November 25, 2025*; 7:00 pm, ESPN+ | | at Marist | L 55–78 | 2–5 | 17 – Whitlock | 8 – Whitlock | 2 – Tied | McCann Arena (790); Poughkeepsie, NY |
| November 28, 2025*; 4:30 pm, FloCollege | | vs. UC Santa Barbara; Resorts World Las Vegas Clasic semifinal | L 70–72 | 2–6 | 22 – Alvey | 6 – Alvey | 5 – Vazquez | Resorts World Events Center; Winchester, NV |
| November 29, 2025*; 2:00 pm, FloCollege | | vs. Texas State; Resorts World Las Vegas Classic 3rd place game | W 78–74 ^{OT} | 3–6 | 31 – Whitlock | 7 – Pike | 4 – Thomas | Resorts World Events Center; Winchester, NV |
| December 2, 2025*; 6:00 pm, ESPN+ | | at Binghamton | L 71–80 ^{OT} | 3–7 | 25 – Ingram | 6 – Tied | 5 – Whitlock | Dr. Bai Lee Court (1,254); Vestal, NY |
| December 6, 2025*; 2:00 pm, ESPN+ | | LIU | L 82–87 | 3–8 | 26 – Alvey | 10 – Alvey | 3 – Tied | Stabler Arena (435); Bethlehem, PA |
| December 18, 2025*; 7:00 pm, ESPN+ | | Penn State Hazleton | W 83–74 | 4–8 | 33 – Whitlock | 11 – Alvey | 4 – Vazquez | Stabler Arena (395); Bethlehem, PA |
| December 21, 2025*; 1:00 pm, FloCollege | | at Monmouth | L 62–76 | 4–9 | 20 – Ingram | 10 – Alvey | 5 – Whitlock | OceanFirst Bank Center (1,527); West Long Branch, NJ |
Patriot League regular season
| December 31, 2025; 12:00 pm, ESPN+ | | Army | L 78–85 ^{OT} | 4–10 (0–1) | 21 – Alvey | 6 – Alvey | 8 – Whitlock | Stabler Arena (757); Bethlehem, PA |
| January 3, 2026; 5:00 pm, ESPN+ | | at Bucknell | L 65–72 | 4–11 (0–2) | 26 – Alvey | 9 – Alvey | 4 – Whitlock | Sojka Pavilion (1,127); Lewisburg, PA |
| January 7, 2026; 6:00 pm, ESPN+ | | Holy Cross | W 66–58 | 5–11 (1–2) | 22 – Benoit | 10 – Ingram | 6 – Ingram | Stabler Arena (473); Bethlehem, PA |
| January 10, 2026; 2:00 pm, ESPN+ | | at Colgate | W 78–77 | 6–11 (2–2) | 27 – Benoit | 11 – Tied | 4 – Tied | Cotterell Court (577); Hamilton, NY |
| January 14, 2026; 6:00 pm, ESPN+ | | at Boston University | W 93–91 ^{OT} | 7–11 (3–2) | 30 – Whitlock | 8 – Benoit | 4 – Whitlock | Case Gym (445); Boston, MA |
| January 17, 2026; 2:00 pm, ESPN+ | | Navy | L 79–82 ^{2OT} | 7–12 (3–3) | 31 – Whitlock | 7 – Tied | 3 – Whitlock | Stabler Arena (689); Bethlehem, PA |
| January 19, 2026; 7:00 pm, CBSSN | | Loyola (MD) | W 88–81 | 8–12 (4–3) | 28 – Whitlock | 7 – Alvey | 7 – Whitlock | Stabler Arena (765); Bethlehem, PA |
| January 24, 2026; 7:00 pm, ESPN+ | | Lafayette; The Rivalry | W 64–59 | 9–12 (5–3) | 20 – Whitlock | 9 – Ingram | 5 – Ingram | Stabler Arena (1,932); Bethlehem, PA |
| January 28, 2026; 6:00 pm, ESPN+ | | at Army | L 64–67 | 9–13 (5–4) | 15 – Whitlock | 9 – Tied | 5 – Ingram | Christl Arena (618); West Point, NY |
| January 31, 2026; 2:00 pm, ESPN+ | | Colgate | W 77–76 ^{OT} | 10–13 (6–4) | 32 – Whitlock | 9 – Benoit | 4 – Ingram | Stabler Arena (939); Bethlehem, PA |
| February 4, 2026; 7:00 pm, ESPN+ | | at Loyola (MD) | L 84–89 ^{2OT} | 10–14 (6–5) | 27 – Alvey | 8 – Alvey | 6 – Tied | Reitz Arena (932); Baltimore, MD |
| February 7, 2026; 2:00 pm, ESPN+ | | at Holy Cross | L 67–76 | 10–15 (6–6) | 28 – Alvey | 10 – Whitlock | 5 – Tied | Hart Center (2,917); Worcester, MA |
| February 11, 2026; 7:00 pm, ESPN+ | | American | W 90–82 | 11–15 (7–6) | 33 – Whitlock | 8 – Tied | 6 – Ingram | Stabler Arena (571); Bethlehem, PA |
| February 14, 2026; 5:00 pm, ESPN+ | | at Lafayette | W 78–69 | 12–15 (8–6) | 22 – Alvey | 9 – Alvey | 5 – Tied | Kirby Sports Center (1,774); Easton, PA |
| February 18, 2026; 7:00 pm, ESPN+ | | at Navy | L 49–72 | 12–16 (8–7) | 20 – Whitlock | 9 – Benoit | 5 – Alvey | Alumni Hall (1,392); Annapolis, MD |
| February 22, 2026; 12:00 pm, CBSSN | | Boston University | W 70–67 | 13–16 (9–7) | 30 – Whitlock | 5 – Tied | 4 – Tied | Stabler Arena (774); Bethlehem, PA |
| February 25, 2026; 7:00 pm, ESPN+ | | at American | W 78–73 | 14–16 (10–7) | 24 – Alvey | 8 – Alvey | 6 – Ingram | Bender Arena (1,141); Washington, D.C. |
| February 28, 2026; 2:00 pm, ESPN+ | | Bucknell | W 89–79 | 15–16 (11–7) | 32 – Whitlock | 8 – Ingram | 8 – Ingram | Stabler Arena (1,146); Bethlehem, PA |
Patriot League tournament
| March 5, 2026; 7:00 pm, ESPN+ | (2) | (10) Holy Cross; Quarterfinal | W 69–66 | 16–16 | 29 – Whitlock | 7 – Vazquez | 4 – Ingram | Stabler Arena (1,350); Bethlehem, PA |
| March 8, 2026; 12:00 pm, CBSSN | (2) | (3) Colgate; Semifinal | W 76–69 | 17–16 | 30 – Alvey | 9 – Benoit | 10 – Whitlock | Stabler Arena (1,683); Bethlehem, PA |
| March 11, 2026; 7:00 pm, CBSSN | (2) | (4) Boston University; Championship | W 74–60 | 18–16 | 18 – Whitlock | 9 – Alvey | 5 – Alvey | Stabler Arena (4,323); Bethlehem, PA |
NCAA tournament
| March 18, 2026*; 6:40 p.m., truTV | (16 S) | vs. (16 S) Prairie View A&M; First Four | L 55–67 | 18–17 | 23 – Alvey | 15 – Alvey | 5 – Alvey | UD Arena (12,558); Dayton, OH |
*Non-conference game. ^{#}Rankings from AP Poll. (#) Tournament seedings in parentheses. S=South. All times are in Eastern.
