= 2025–26 Bucknell Bison men's basketball team =

American college basketball season

2025–26 Bucknell Bison men's basketball
- Conference: Patriot League
- Record: 10–23 (6–12 Patriot)
- Head coach: John Griffin III (3rd season)
- Assistant coaches: Matt Griffin; Branden McDonald; Jesse Flannery
- Home arena: Sojka Pavilion

2025–26 Patriot League men's basketball standings
	Conf.				Overall
Team	W		L	PCT	W		L	PCT
Navy	17	–	1	.944	26	–	8	.765
Lehigh †	11	–	7	.611	18	–	17	.514
Colgate	11	–	7	.611	18	–	15	.545
Boston University	10	–	8	.556	17	–	17	.500
American	9	–	9	.500	16	–	16	.500
Loyola	8	–	10	.444	12	–	20	.375
Lafayette	8	–	10	.444	11	–	21	.344
Bucknell	6	–	12	.333	10	–	23	.303
Army	5	–	13	.278	11	–	21	.344
Holy Cross	5	–	13	.278	11	–	22	.333
† 2026 Patriot League tournament winner

The 2025–26 Bucknell Bison men's basketball team represented Bucknell University during the 2025–26 NCAA Division I men's basketball season. The Bison, led by third-year head coach John Griffin III, played their home games at Sojka Pavilion in Lewisburg, Pennsylvania as members of the Patriot League.

== Previous season ==
The Bison finished the 2024–25 season 18–15, 13–5 in Patriot League play, to finish as Patriot League regular season co-champions, alongside American. They defeated Loyola (MD), before being upset by Navy in the semifinals of the Patriot League tournament.

== Preseason ==
On October 15, 2025, the Patriot League released their preseason poll. Bucknell was picked to finish fifth in the conference.

=== Preseason rankings ===
Patriot League Preseason Poll
Place	Team	Points
1	Navy	79 (7)
2	Boston University	73 (2)
3	Colgate	64 (1)
4	American	47
5	Bucknell	44
6	Loyola (MD)	39
7	Lafayette	36
8	Lehigh	30
9	Holy Cross	23
10	Army	15
(#) first-place votes

=== Preseason All-Patriot League Team ===
No players were named to the Preseason All-Patriot League Team.

== Roster ==
2025–26 Bucknell Bison men's basketball team
Players
Coaches

Pos.	#	Name	Height	Weight	Year	Previous school	Hometown
F	0	Patrick O'Brien	6 ft 8 in (2.03 m)	220 lb (100 kg)	Jr	Bishop O'Connell High School	Warrenton, Virginia
G	1	Jacob Meachem	5 ft 8 in (1.73 m)	165 lb (75 kg)	Fr	The Hill School	Pottstown, Pennsylvania
G	2	Jayden Williams	5 ft 10 in (1.78 m)	180 lb (82 kg)	So	Blair Academy	Bronx, New York
G	3	Aleksander Pachucki	6 ft 5 in (1.96 m)	190 lb (86 kg)	So	Fordham	Scarborough, Ontario
F	4	Ruot Bijiek	6 ft 9 in (2.06 m)	195 lb (88 kg)	Sr	Valley High School	Waukee, Iowa
F	5	Josh Fulton	6 ft 6 in (1.98 m)	205 lb (93 kg)	Sr	Greater Atlanta Christian School	Atlanta, Georgia
G	7	Matt Lange	6 ft 2 in (1.88 m)	190 lb (86 kg)	So	Shipley School	Newtown Square, Pennsylvania
G	10	Brandon McCreesh	6 ft 4 in (1.93 m)	195 lb (88 kg)	Jr	Hotchkiss School	Bronx, New York
F	11	Brady Muller	6 ft 4 in (1.93 m)	210 lb (95 kg)	Sr	Blair Academy	Wyckoff, New Jersey
G	12	Quin Berger	6 ft 2 in (1.88 m)	200 lb (91 kg)	Sr	Saint Joseph's	Malvern, Pennsylvania
G	21	Pat Curtin	6 ft 3 in (1.91 m)	205 lb (93 kg)	Fr	Glenelg Country School	Ellicott City, Maryland
F/C	22	Amon Dörries	6 ft 11 in (2.11 m)	230 lb (104 kg)	Fr	Schul- und Leistungssport Zentrum	Potsdam, Germany
C	23	Grgur Brcic	6 ft 10 in (2.08 m)	235 lb (107 kg)	Jr	Toledo	Zagreb, Croatia
G	24	Achile Spadone	6 ft 4 in (1.93 m)	205 lb (93 kg)	Sr	Davidson	Geneva, Switzerland
F	32	Kellen Welch	6 ft 7 in (2.01 m)	200 lb (91 kg)	So	St. Christopher's School	Richmond, Virginia

Head coach

- John Griffin III (Bucknell)

Assistant coach(es)

- Matt Griffin (Boston University)
- Branden McDonald (Virginia Union)
- Jesse Flannery (Johns Hopkins)

Legend

- (C) Team captain
- (S) Suspended
- (I) Ineligible
- (W) Walk-on
- Injured
- Current redshirt

Roster
Last update: November 26, 2025

== Schedule and results ==
Date time, TV	Rank^{#}	Opponent^{#}	Result	Record	Site (attendance) city, state
Exhibition
October 28, 2025*; 7:00 pm, ACCNX		at No. 11 Louisville; Kentuckiana Friends of V Classic	L 76–99	–	KFC Yum! Center (13,840); Louisville, KY
Non-conference regular season
November 3, 2025*; 7:00 pm, ESPN+		Delaware	W 78–70	1–0	Sojka Pavilion (1,431); Lewisburg, PA
November 7, 2025*; 7:00 pm, ESPN+		at Mount St. Mary's	W 73–62	2–0	Knott Arena (2,821); Emmitsburg, MD
November 11, 2025*; 7:00 pm, ESPN+		at Princeton	L 63–73	2–1	Jadwin Gymnasium (1,134); Princeton, NJ
November 14, 2025*; 7:00 pm, ESPN+		Hofstra	L 77–83	2–2	Sojka Pavilion (1,232); Lewisburg, PA
November 17, 2025*; 7:00 pm, ACCNX		at Pittsburgh	L 50–84	2–3	Petersen Events Center (4,674); Pittsburgh, PA
November 20, 2025*; 7:00 pm, TNT/TruTV		at No. 14 St. John's	L 49–97	2–4	Carnesecca Arena (5,260); Queens, NY
November 24, 2025*; 12:00 pm, PTB Live		vs. Bowling Green; Fort Myers Tip-Off Palms Division	L 66–71	2–5	Suncoast Credit Union Arena (682); Fort Myers, FL
November 26, 2025*; 1:30 pm, PTB Live		vs. Buffalo; Fort Myers Tip-Off Palms Division	L 71–73	2–6	Suncoast Credit Union Arena (621); Fort Myers, FL
November 30, 2025*; 2:00 pm, ESPN+		Cornell	L 72−101	2−7	Sojka Pavilion (861); Lewisburg, PA
December 3, 2025*; 7:00 pm, ESPN+		at Akron	L 77−97	2−8	James A. Rhodes Arena (1,508); Akron, OH
December 6, 2025*; 12:00 pm, ESPN+		UMBC	L 66–73	2–9	Sojka Pavilion (741); Lewisburg, PA
December 9, 2025*; 7:00 pm, ESPN+		at Rider	W 51–38	3–9	Alumni Gymnasium (1,216); Lawrenceville, NJ
December 20, 2025*; 6:00 pm, BTN		vs. Iowa	L 39–94	3–10	Casey's Center (8,177); Des Moines, IA
Patriot League regular season
December 31, 2025; 2:00 pm, ESPN+		at Holy Cross	L 58–65	3–11 (0–1)	Hart Center (1,124); Worcester, MA
January 3, 2026; 5:00 pm, ESPN+		Lehigh	W 72–65	4–11 (1–1)	Sojka Pavilion (1,127); Lewisburg, PA
January 7, 2026; 7:00 pm, ESPN+		at Navy	L 55–76	4–12 (1–2)	Alumni Hall (758); Annapolis, MD
January 10, 2026; 5:00 pm, ESPN+		Loyola (MD)	W 70–66	5–12 (2–2)	Sojka Pavilion (1,582); Lewisburg, PA
January 14, 2026; 7:30 pm, ESPN+		Lafayette	W 76–69	6–12 (3–2)	Sojka Pavilion (1,071); Lewisburg, PA
January 17, 2026; 2:00 pm, ESPN+		at Colgate	L 76–95	6–13 (3–3)	Cotterell Court (596); Hamilton, NY
January 21, 2026; 7:00 pm, ESPN+		Army	L 84–87	6–14 (3–4)	Sojka Pavilion (819); Lewisburg, PA
January 24, 2026; 2:00 pm, ESPN+		at Loyola (MD)	L 62–67	6–15 (3–5)	Reitz Arena (1,167); Baltimore, MD
January 28, 2026; 7:00 pm, ESPN+		at Lafayette	L 79-81	6-16 (3-6)	Kirby Sports Center (1,168); Easton, PA
January 31, 2026; 2:00 pm, ESPN+		Boston University	W 103-97 ^{2 OT}	7-16 (4-6)	Sojka Pavilion (1,429); Lewisburg, PA
February 4, 2026; 7:00 pm, ESPN+		at American	W 60-59	8-16 (5-6)	Bender Arena (953); Washington, D.C.
February 7, 2026; 5:00 pm, ESPN+		Colgate	L 59-78	8-17 (5-7)	Sojka Pavilion (1,269); Lewisburg, PA
February 9, 2026; 6:00 pm, CBSSN		Navy	L 60−76	8−18 (5−8)	Sojka Pavilion (1,417); Lewisburg, PA
February 14, 2026; 1:00 pm, ESPN+		at Boston University	L 69−82	8−19 (5−9)	Case Gym (733); Boston, MA
February 18, 2026; 7:00 pm, ESPN+		American	L 57−75	8−20 (5−10)	Sojka Pavilion (648); Lewisburg, PA
February 22, 2026; 12:00 pm, ESPN+		Holy Cross	L 63−72	8−21 (5−11)	Sojka Pavilion (901); Lewisburg, PA
February 25, 2026; 3:00 pm, ESPN+		at Army	W 75−73	9−21 (6−11)	Christl Arena (543); West Point, NY
February 28, 2026; 2:00 pm, ESPN+		at Lehigh	L 79−89	9−22 (6−12)	Stabler Arena (1,146); Bethlehem, PA
Patriot League tournament
March 3, 2026; 7:00 pm, ESPN+	(8)	(9) Army; First round	W 65–55	10–22	Sojka Pavilion (606); Lewisburg, PA
March 5, 2026; 7:00 pm, ESPN+	(8)	at (1) Navy; Quarterfinals	L 69–74	10–23	Alumni Hall (1,209); Annapolis, MD
*Non-conference game. ^{#}Rankings from AP Poll. (#) Tournament seedings in parentheses. All times are in Eastern.
