= 2025–26 Boston University Terriers men's basketball team =

American college basketball season

2025–26 Boston University Terriers men's basketball
- Conference: Patriot League
- Record: 17–17 (10–8 Patriot)
- Head coach: Joe Jones (15th season)
- Associate head coach: Mike Quinn
- Assistant coaches: Matt Brady; Al Paul
- Home arena: Case Gym

2025–26 Patriot League men's basketball standings
	Conf.				Overall
Team	W		L	PCT	W		L	PCT
Navy	17	–	1	.944	26	–	7	.788
Lehigh †	11	–	7	.611	18	–	16	.529
Colgate	11	–	7	.611	18	–	15	.545
Boston University	10	–	8	.556	17	–	17	.500
American	9	–	9	.500	16	–	16	.500
Loyola	8	–	10	.444	12	–	20	.375
Lafayette	8	–	10	.444	11	–	21	.344
Bucknell	6	–	12	.333	10	–	23	.303
Army	5	–	13	.278	11	–	21	.344
Holy Cross	5	–	13	.278	11	–	22	.333
† 2026 Patriot League tournament winner As of March 11, 2026

The 2025–26 Boston University Terriers men's basketball team represented Boston University during the 2025–26 NCAA Division I men's basketball season. The Terriers, led by 15th-year head coach Joe Jones, played their home games at Case Gym in Boston, Massachusetts as members of the Patriot League.

== Previous season ==
The Terriers finished the 2024–25 season 16–16, 10–8 in Patriot League play, to finish in a four-way tie for third place. They were defeated by Navy in the quarterfinals of the Patriot League tournament.

== Preseason ==
On October 15, 2025, the Patriot League released their preseason poll. Boston University was picked to finish second in the conference, while receiving two first-place votes.

=== Preseason rankings ===
Patriot League Preseason Poll
Place	Team	Points
1	Navy	79 (7)
2	Boston University	73 (2)
3	Colgate	64 (1)
4	American	47
5	Bucknell	44
6	Loyola (MD)	39
7	Lafayette	36
8	Lehigh	30
9	Holy Cross	23
10	Army	15
(#) first-place votes

=== Preseason All-Patriot League Team ===
Preseason All-Patriot League Team
Player	Year	Position
Kyrone Alexander	Junior	Guard

== Roster ==
2025–26 Boston University Terriers men's basketball team
Players
Coaches

Pos.	#	Name	Height	Weight	Year	Previous school	Hometown
G/F	0	Matai Baptiste	6 ft 5 in (1.96 m)	215 lb (98 kg)	Jr	Orangeville Prep	Toronto, Ontario
G	1	Ethan Okwuosa	6 ft 3 in (1.91 m)	195 lb (88 kg)	GS	Southern New Hampshire	North Haven, Connecticut
G	2	Chance Gladden	6 ft 4 in (1.93 m)	185 lb (84 kg)	Fr	Ravenscroft School	Raleigh, North Carolina
F	3	Malcolm Chimezie	6 ft 8 in (2.03 m)	220 lb (100 kg)	GS	Stepinac High School	Yonkers, New York
G	5	Kyrone Alexander	6 ft 5 in (1.96 m)	200 lb (91 kg)	Jr	South Shore High School	Bridgetown, Barbados
F	6	Sam Hughes	6 ft 6 in (1.98 m)	205 lb (93 kg)	Fr	Dexter Southfield School	Needham, Massachusetts
G	7	Azmar Abdullah	6 ft 3 in (1.91 m)	180 lb (82 kg)	So	Bishop Hendricken High School	Cranston, Rhode Island
G	8	Peter Carr	6 ft 5 in (1.96 m)	205 lb (93 kg)	So	Virginia Tech	West Chester, Pennsylvania
F	14	Ben Defty	7 ft 0 in (2.13 m)	255 lb (116 kg)	So	St. Thomas More School	Berlin, Germany
F	15	Andrew Bhesania	6 ft 9 in (2.06 m)	205 lb (93 kg)	Fr	Boulder Creek High School	Phoenix, Arizona
G	20	Michael McNair	6 ft 5 in (1.96 m)	200 lb (91 kg)	Jr	Linfield Christian School	Temecula, California
G	21	Donte Tisinger Jr.	6 ft 3 in (1.91 m)	190 lb (86 kg)	Fr	Greater Johnstown High School	Johnstown, Pennsylvania
G	30	Ben Roy	6 ft 0 in (1.83 m)	170 lb (77 kg)	Sr	Manasquan High School	Spring Lake Heights, New Jersey
F	32	Quinn Nielsen	6 ft 11 in (2.11 m)	250 lb (113 kg)	Jr	The Citadel	Hingham, Massachusetts
F	41	Otto Landrum	6 ft 9 in (2.06 m)	215 lb (98 kg)	Sr	Torrey Pines High School	San Diego, California

Head coach

- Joe Jones (SUNY–Oswego)

Assistant coach(es)

- Mike Quinn (Bentley)
- Matt Brady (Siena)
- Al Paul (SUNY Delhi)

Legend

- (C) Team captain
- (S) Suspended
- (I) Ineligible
- (W) Walk-on
- Injured
- Current redshirt

Roster
Last update: November 23, 2025

== Schedule and results ==
Date time, TV	Rank^{#}	Opponent^{#}	Result	Record	Site (attendance) city, state
Non-conference regular season
November 3, 2025*; 7:30 pm, NESN/FloCollege		at Northeastern	W 76–75 ^{OT}	1–0	Matthews Arena (2,189); Boston, MA
November 7, 2025*; 6:00 pm, Peacock		at Northwestern	L 52–76	1–1	Welsh–Ryan Arena (4,995); Evanston, IL
November 12, 2025*; 7:00 pm, ESPN+		Brown	W 90–77	2–1	Case Gym (1,455); Boston, MA
November 15, 2025*; 1:00 pm, ESPN+		Merrimack	L 79–91	2–2	Case Gym (1,024); Boston, MA
November 18, 2025*; 7:00 pm, SNY/ESPN+		at Columbia	L 49–54	2–3	Levien Gymnasium (761); New York, NY
November 22, 2025*; 1:30 pm, NESN Nation		vs. Harvard; Basketball Hall of Fame Showcase	W 75–74	3–3	Mohegan Sun Arena; Uncasville, CT
November 25, 2025*; 7:00 pm, NBCSN/Peacock		at Penn State	L 87–96	3–4	Bryce Jordan Center (4,424); University Park, PA
November 29, 2025*; 1:00 pm, ESPN+		at Northern Kentucky	L 65–74	3–5	Truist Arena (1,502); Highland Heights, KY
December 3, 2025*; 6:00 pm, ESPN+		VTSU Johnson	W 104–57	4–5	Case Gym (510); Boston, MA
December 6, 2025*; 7:00 pm, ESPN+		at New Hampshire	L 82–88 ^{OT}	4–6	Lundholm Gym (469); Durham, NH
December 10, 2025*; 7:00 pm, NESN/ESPN+		Maine	L 59−69	4−7	Case Gym (654); Boston, MA
December 13, 2025*; 2:00 pm, ESPN+		at Dartmouth	L 64−77	4−8	Leede Arena (898); Hanover, NH
December 21, 2025*; 12:00 pm, ESPN+		UMass Lowell	W 88–76	5–8	Case Gym (810); Boston, MA
Patriot League regular season
December 31, 2025; 1:00 pm, ESPN+		at Navy	L 77–82	5–9 (0–1)	Alumni Hall (1,213); Annapolis, MD
January 3, 2026; 1:00 pm, ESPN+		American	L 62–64	5–10 (0–2)	Case Gym (1,015); Boston, MA
January 7, 2026; 7:00 pm, ESPN+		at Lafayette	W 83–67	6–10 (1–2)	Kirby Sports Center (1,028); Easton, PA
January 10, 2026; 1:00 pm, ESPN+		Army	W 100–91	7–10 (2–2)	Case Gym (725); Boston, MA
January 14, 2026; 6:00 pm, ESPN+		Lehigh	L 91–93	7–11 (2–3)	Case Gym (445); Boston, MA
January 17, 2026; 1:00 pm, ESPN+		at Loyola (MD)	L 57–74	7–12 (2–4)	Reitz Arena (642); Baltimore, MD
January 21, 2026; 6:00 pm, ESPN+		Lafayette	W 77–73 ^{OT}	8–12 (3–4)	Case Gym (1,057); Boston, MA
January 24, 2026; 2:00 pm, ESPN+		at Colgate	L 79–80	8–13 (3–5)	Cotterell Court (739); Hamilton, NY
January 28, 2026; 7:00 pm, ESPN+		Navy	L 50–58	8–14 (3–6)	Case Gym (663); Boston, MA
January 31, 2026; 2:00 pm, ESPN+		at Bucknell	L 97–103 ^{2OT}	8–15 (3–7)	Sojka Pavilion (1,429); Lewisburg, PA
February 2, 2026; 7:00 pm, CBSSN		at Holy Cross; Turnpike Trophy	W 72–64	9–15 (4–7)	Hart Center (2,512); Worcester, MA
February 7, 2026; 1:00 pm, ESPN+		Loyola (MD)	W 78–69	10–15 (5–7)	Case Gym (864); Boston, MA
February 11, 2026; 6:00 pm, ESPN+		at Army	W 85–68	11–15 (6–7)	Christl Arena (580); West Point, NY
February 14, 2026; 1:00 pm, ESPN+		Bucknell	W 82–69	12–15 (7–7)	Case Gym (733); Boston, MA
February 16, 2026; 6:00 pm, CBSSN		Colgate	W 85–58	13–15 (8–7)	Case Gym (1,590); Boston, MA
February 22, 2026; 12:00 pm, CBSSN		at Lehigh	L 67–70	13–16 (8–8)	Stabler Arena (774); Bethlehem, PA
February 25, 2026; 7:00 pm, ESPN+		Holy Cross; Turnpike Trophy	W 78–63	14–16 (9–8)	Case Gym (803); Boston, MA
February 28, 2026; 2:00 pm, ESPN+		at American	W 68–65	15–16 (10–8)	Bender Arena (1,509); Washington, D.C.
Patriot League tournament
March 5, 2026; 7:00 pm, ESPN+	(4)	(5) American; Quarterfinals	W 75–73	16–16	Case Gym; Boston, MA
March 8, 2026; 2:00 pm, CBSSN	(4)	at (1) Navy; Semifinals	W 73–72	17–16	Alumni Hall (1,722); Annapolis, MD
March 11, 2026; 7:00 pm, CBSSN	(4)	at (2) Lehigh; Championship	L 60–74	17–17	Stabler Arena (4,323); Bethlehem, PA
*Non-conference game. ^{#}Rankings from AP Poll. (#) Tournament seedings in parentheses. All times are in Eastern.
