= 2025–26 Army Black Knights men's basketball team =

American college basketball season

2025–26 Army Black Knights men's basketball
- Conference: Patriot League
- Record: 11–21 (5–13 Patriot)
- Head coach: Kevin Kuwik (3rd season)
- Assistant coaches: Jarren Dyson; Nick Thorsen; Bryan Joel; Brandon Newsome; Will Louis
- Home arena: Christl Arena

2025–26 Patriot League men's basketball standings
	Conf.				Overall
Team	W		L	PCT	W		L	PCT
Navy	17	–	1	.944	26	–	6	.813
Lehigh	11	–	7	.611	16	–	16	.500
Colgate	11	–	7	.611	18	–	14	.563
Boston University	10	–	8	.556	16	–	16	.500
American	9	–	9	.500	16	–	16	.500
Loyola	8	–	10	.444	12	–	20	.375
Lafayette	8	–	10	.444	11	–	21	.344
Bucknell	6	–	12	.333	10	–	23	.303
Army	5	–	13	.278	11	–	21	.344
Holy Cross	5	–	13	.278	11	–	22	.333
† 2026 Patriot League tournament winner As of March 5, 2026

The 2025–26 Army Black Knights men's basketball team represented the United States Military Academy in the 2025–26 NCAA Division I men's basketball season. The Black Knights, led by third-year head coach Kevin Kuwik, played their home games at Christl Arena in West Point, New York as members of the Patriot League.

== Previous season ==
The Black Knights finished the 2024–25 season 17–16, 10–8 in Patriot League play to tie for third place. As the No. 6 seed in the Patriot League tournament, they were defeated by Colgate in the first round.

== Roster ==
2025–26 Army Black Knights men's basketball team
Players
Coaches

Pos.	#	Name	Height	Weight	Year	Previous school	Hometown
G	0	Dayon Polk	6 ft 0 in (1.83 m)	180 lb (82 kg)	So	Sanford School (USMAPS)	Wilmington, DE
G	1	Jackson Furman	6 ft 2 in (1.88 m)	180 lb (82 kg)	Fr	Riverdale Baptist (USMAPS)	Upper Marlboro, MD
G	2	Ryan Curry	6 ft 1 in (1.85 m)	185 lb (84 kg)	Jr	Montgomery HS (USMAPS)	Montgomery, NJ
G	4	Jaxson Bell	6 ft 2 in (1.88 m)	211 lb (96 kg)	So	North Central HS	Indianapolis, IN
F	5	Joshua Eli	6 ft 6 in (1.98 m)	215 lb (98 kg)	So	Paul VI HS (USMAPS)	Woodbury, NJ
F	10	Jacen Holloway	6 ft 4 in (1.93 m)	225 lb (102 kg)	So	Devon Prep (USMAPS)	Schwenksville, PA
G	12	Dylan Murans	6 ft 7 in (2.01 m)	197 lb (89 kg)	So	Guerin Catholic HS	Carmel, IN
G	13	Dillon Watt	5 ft 10 in (1.78 m)	177 lb (80 kg)	Fr	Greenhill School (USMAPS)	Plano, TX
G	14	Brendon O'Keefe	5 ft 10 in (1.78 m)	180 lb (82 kg)	So	Regis HS	New Rochelle, NY
F	15	Chanse Perkins	6 ft 4 in (1.93 m)	230 lb (104 kg)	Sr	Woodlands Christian Academy	Houston, TX
G	21	Jackson Mayo	6 ft 0 in (1.83 m)	190 lb (86 kg)	Sr	Mililani HS	Mililani, HI
G	22	Kevin McCarthy	6 ft 4 in (1.93 m)	192 lb (87 kg)	So	Episcopal Academy	West Chester, PA
F	23	Dylan Benner	6 ft 7 in (2.01 m)	225 lb (102 kg)	Fr	St. Bonaventure HS (USMAPS)	Ventura, CA
G	24	Alex Engro	6 ft 1 in (1.85 m)	187 lb (85 kg)	So	Loyola Academy	Glenview, IL
G	25	Jahaan Green	6 ft 3 in (1.91 m)	195 lb (88 kg)	Fr	Eastside HS (USMAPS)	Swedesboro, NJ
F	32	Tate Laczkowski	6 ft 9 in (2.06 m)	218 lb (99 kg)	Jr	Wilbraham & Monson Academy	Dallas, TX
F	34	Nnaemeka Ikechi	6 ft 8 in (2.03 m)	230 lb (104 kg)	So	De La Salle Collegiate HS	Warren, MI
F	54	Jorn Everson	6 ft 8 in (2.03 m)	210 lb (95 kg)	Sr	Northfield Mount Hermon School	Williston, ND

Head coach

- Kevin Kuwik (Notre Dame)

Assistant coach(es)

- Jarren Dyson (Emory & Henry)
- Nick Thorsen (Penn State Behrend)
- Bryan Joel (Caltech)
- Brandon Newsome (Johnson & Wales)
- Will Louis (Doane)

Legend

- (C) Team captain
- (S) Suspended
- (I) Ineligible
- (W) Walk-on
- Injured
- Current redshirt

Roster
Last update: November 25, 2025

== Schedule and results ==
Date time, TV	Rank^{#}	Opponent^{#}	Result	Record	High points	High rebounds	High assists	Site (attendance) city, state
Non-conference regular season
November 3, 2025*; 8:00 pm, ESPN+		SUNY Maritime	W 73–49	1–0	18 – McCarthy	9 – Laczkowski	3 – Tied	Christl Arena (829); West Point, NY
November 8, 2025*; 8:00 pm, Summit Network		at St. Thomas	L 76–83	1–1	16 – Holloway	8 – Laczkowski	7 – Curry	Anderson Arena (5,325); St. Paul, MN
November 11, 2025*; 7:00 pm, CBSSN		No. 4 Duke	L 59–114	1–2	20 – Furman	5 – Holloway	4 – McCarthy	Christl Arena (5,326); West Point, NY
November 15, 2025*; 2:00 pm, ESPN+		Harvard	L 52–75	1–3	11 – Curry	4 – Tied	3 – Curry	Christl Arena (911); West Point, NY
November 18, 2025*; 8:00 pm, ESPN+		at Cornell	L 73–86	1–4	24 – Everson	7 – Laczkowski	6 – Curry	Newman Arena; Ithaca, NY
November 21, 2025*; 7:00 pm, ESPN+		at Marist	L 65–76	1–5	16 – Curry	8 – Curry	3 – Curry	McCann Arena (1,920); Poughkeepsie, NY
November 25, 2025*; 2:00 pm		vs. East Texas A&M; FDU Basketball Classic	L 67–84	1–6	12 – McCarthy	4 – McCarthy	3 – Curry	Bogota Savings Bank Center (350); Hackensack, NJ
November 26, 2025*; 2:00 pm, NEC Front Row		at Fairleigh Dickinson; FDU Basketball Classic	W 81–73	2–6	16 – Bell	11 – Eli	4 – Curry	Bogota Savings Bank Center (409); Hackensack, NJ
November 29, 2025*; 1:00 pm, ESPN+		Manhattan	W 81–78 ^{OT}	3–6	26 – Curry	8 – Curry	7 – Curry	Christl Arena (950); West Point, NY
December 2, 2025*; 11:00 am, ESPN+		George Washington	L 70–84	3–7	15 – Bell	4 – Tied	7 – Curry	Christl Arena (377); West Point, NY
December 7, 2025*; 12:00 pm, ESPN+		Gallaudet	W 111–53	4–7	18 – McCarthy	7 – Furman	8 – Curry	Christl Arena (620); West Point, NY
December 12, 2025*; 6:00 pm, ESPN+		at UMBC	W 63–60	5–7	12 – Tied	10 – Bell	3 – Curry	Chesapeake Arena (1,209); Baltimore, MD
December 23, 2025*; 12:00 pm, ESPN+		Binghamton	W 95–85 ^{OT}	6–7	24 – Bell	9 – Curry	7 – Curry	Christl Arena (841); West Point, NY
Patriot League regular season
December 31, 2025; 2:00 pm, ESPN+		at Lehigh	W 85–78 ^{OT}	7–7 (1–0)	19 – Curry	14 – Curry	4 – Tied	Stabler Arena (757); Bethlehem, PA
January 3, 2026; 1:00 pm, ESPN+		Colgate	L 69–76	7–8 (1–1)	24 – Curry	8 – Tied	7 – Curry	Christl Arena (1,073); West Point, NY
January 7, 2026; 6:00 pm, ESPN+		Loyola (MD)	L 76–84 ^{OT}	7–9 (1–2)	19 – Curry	10 – Furman	4 – Laczkowski	Christl Arena (643); West Point, NY
January 10, 2026; 1:00 pm, ESPN+		at Boston University	L 91–100	7–10 (1–3)	24 – Curry	6 – Laczkowski	8 – Curry	Case Gym (725); Boston, MA
January 14, 2026; 6:00 pm, ESPN+		at Holy Cross	L 75–82	7–11 (1–4)	20 – Bell	13 – Laczkowski	6 – Curry	Hart Center (689); Worcester, MA
January 18, 2026; 1:00 pm, ESPN+		American	L 67–78	7–12 (1–5)	21 – Holloway	7 – Laczkowski	6 – Curry	Christl Arena (887); West Point, NY
January 21, 2026; 7:00 pm, ESPN+		at Bucknell	W 87–84 ^{OT}	8–12 (2–5)	18 – Bell	7 – Laczkowski	2 – Furman	Sojka Pavilion (819); Lewisburg, PA
January 24, 2026; 1:30 pm, CBSSN		at Navy; Rivalry	L 56–84	8–13 (2–6)	15 – Curry	5 – Bell	4 – Holloway	Alumni Hall (4,731); Annapolis, MD
January 28, 2026; 6:00 pm, ESPN+		Lehigh	W 67–64	9–13 (3–6)	17 – Laczkowski	9 – Bell	6 – Curry	Christl Arena (618); West Point, NY
January 31, 2026; 1:00 pm, ESPN+		Holy Cross	W 69–68	10–13 (4–6)	27 – Curry	12 – Eli	4 – Curry	Christl Arena (1,165); West Point, NY
February 4, 2026; 7:00 pm, ESPN+		at Colgate	L 55–69	10–14 (4–7)	18 – Bell	6 – Holloway	3 – Bell	Cotterell Court; Hamilton, NY
February 7, 2026; 1:00 pm, ESPN+		Lafayette	L 60–63	10–15 (4–8)	14 – Everson	8 – Furman	5 – Curry	Christl Arena (758); West Point, NY
February 11, 2026; 6:00 pm, ESPN+		Boston University	L 68–85	10–16 (4–9)	19 – Holloway	7 – Curry	6 – Curry	Christl Arena (580); West Point, NY
February 14, 2026; 2:00 pm, ESPN+		at American	L 63–75	10–17 (4–10)	13 – Bell	8 – Laczkowski	4 – Tied	Bender Arena (1,063); Washington, D.C.
February 18, 2026; 7:00 pm, ESPN+		at Loyola (MD)	W 87–77	11–17 (5–10)	17 – Tied	11 – Eli	3 – Laczkowski	Reitz Arena (679); Baltimore, MD
February 21, 2026; 1:30 pm, CBSSN		Navy; Rivalry	L 63–81	11–18 (5–11)	17 – Bell	5 – Bell	4 – Laczkowski	Christl Arena (3,968); West Point, NY
February 25, 2026; 3:00 pm, ESPN+		Bucknell	L 73–75	11–19 (5–12)	21 – Tied	9 – Holloway	10 – Bell	Christl Arena (543); West Point, NY
February 28, 2026; 1:00 pm, ESPN+		at Lafayette	L 77–83	11–20 (5–13)	22 – Bell	8 – Bell	5 – Curry	Kirby Sports Center (1,764); Easton, PA
Patriot League tournament
March 3, 2026; 7:00 pm, ESPN+	(9)	at (8) Bucknell; First round	L 55–65	11–21	14 – Bell	6 – Tied	3 – Curry	Sojka Pavilion (606); Lewisburg, PA
*Non-conference game. ^{#}Rankings from AP Poll. (#) Tournament seedings in parentheses. All times are in Eastern.
