= 2025–26 Saint Joseph's Hawks men's basketball team =

American college basketball season

2025–26 Saint Joseph's Hawks men's basketball
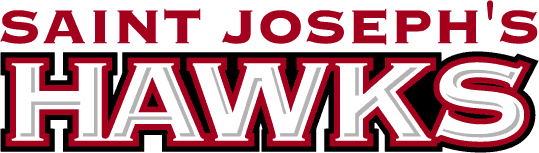

NIT, Quarterfinals
- Conference: Atlantic 10 Conference
- Record: 24–12 (13–5 A–10)
- Head coach: Steve Donahue (1st season)
- Assistant coaches: Bino Ranson; Dwayne Jones; Thomas Boyle; Chris Flegler
- Home arena: Hagan Arena

2025–26 Atlantic 10 men's basketball standings
	Conf.				Overall
Team	W		L	PCT	W		L	PCT
Saint Louis	15	–	3	.833	29	–	6	.829
VCU †	15	–	3	.833	28	–	8	.778
Saint Joseph's	13	–	5	.722	24	–	12	.667
Dayton	12	–	6	.667	25	–	11	.694
George Mason	11	–	7	.611	23	–	10	.697
Davidson	10	–	8	.556	20	–	14	.588
Duquesne	9	–	9	.500	18	–	15	.545
Fordham	8	–	10	.444	17	–	15	.531
George Washington	8	–	10	.444	19	–	16	.543
Rhode Island	7	–	11	.389	16	–	16	.500
Richmond	5	–	13	.278	15	–	17	.469
La Salle	5	–	13	.278	9	–	23	.281
St. Bonaventure	4	–	14	.222	17	–	17	.500
Loyola Chicago	4	–	14	.222	9	–	24	.273
† 2026 A-10 tournament winner As of March 24, 2026; Rankings from AP Poll

The 2025–26 Saint Joseph's Hawks men's basketball team represented Saint Joseph's University during the 2025–26 NCAA Division I men's basketball season. The Hawks, led by first-year head coach Steve Donahue, played their home games at Hagan Arena in Philadelphia, Pennsylvania as members of the Atlantic 10 Conference.

== Previous season ==
The Hawks finished the 2024–25 season 22–13, 11–7 in A-10 play, to finish in a tie for fifth place. They defeated La Salle and Dayton, before falling to George Mason in the semifinals of the A-10 tournament. They received an at-large bid to the NIT, where they would be defeated by UAB in the first round.

On September 10, 2025, it was announced that head coach Billy Lange would be leaving the program, after six seasons at the helm, in order to take an assistant coaching position for the New York Knicks, with recently hired associate head coach and former Penn head coach Steve Donahue being named Lange's replacement.

== Preseason ==
On September 30, 2025, the Atlantic 10 Conference released their preseason poll. Saint Joseph's was picked to finish seventh in the conference.

=== Preseason rankings ===
Atlantic 10 Preseason Poll
Place	Team	Votes
1	VCU	342 (11)
2	Saint Louis	341 (11)
3	Dayton	321 (3)
4	George Washington	296
5	Loyola Chicago	286 (2)
6	George Mason	254
7	Saint Joseph's	195
8	St. Bonaventure	185
9	Duquesne	155
10	Richmond	142
11	Davidson	107
12	Rhode Island	102
13	La Salle	56
14	Fordham	53
(#) first-place votes

=== Preseason All-Atlantic 10 Teams ===
Preseason All-Atlantic 10 Teams
Team	Player	Year	Position
First	Deuce Jones II	Sophomore	Guard

=== Preseason All-A-10 Defensive Team ===
Preseason All-A-10 Defensive Team
Player	Year	Position
Justice Ajogbor	Graduate Student	Center

== Roster ==
2025–26 Saint Joseph's Hawks men's basketball team
Players
Coaches

Pos.	#	Name	Height	Weight	Year	Previous school	Hometown
G	0	Derek Simpson	6 ft 3 in (1.91 m)	175 lb (79 kg)	Sr	Rutgers	Mount Laurel, New Jersey
F	1	Kevin Kearney	6 ft 7 in (2.01 m)	195 lb (88 kg)	RS Fr	South Shore High School	Brooklyn, New York
G	2	Deuce Jones II	6 ft 2 in (1.88 m)	170 lb (77 kg)	So	La Salle	Trenton, New Jersey
G	3	Khaafiq Myers	5 ft 10 in (1.78 m)	165 lb (75 kg)	RS Fr	Neumann Goretti High School	Philadelphia, Pennsylvania
F	5	Anthony Finkley	6 ft 7 in (2.01 m)	235 lb (107 kg)	Jr	Roman Catholic High School	Philadelphia, Pennsylvania
G	6	Owen Verna	6 ft 3 in (1.91 m)	200 lb (91 kg)	Fr	Mater Dei High School	Dana Point, California
G	7	Dasear Haskins	6 ft 8 in (2.03 m)	200 lb (91 kg)	RS So	Camden High School	Willingboro, New Jersey
C	10	Jaden Smith	6 ft 11 in (2.11 m)	225 lb (102 kg)	So	Fordham	Chicago, Illinois
G	11	Jaiden Glover-Toscano	6 ft 6 in (1.98 m)	205 lb (93 kg)	So	St. John's	Brooklyn, New York
G	13	Austin Williford	6 ft 4 in (1.93 m)	195 lb (88 kg)	Fr	St. Anne's-Belfield School	Charlottesville, Virginia
C	15	Steven Solano	7 ft 0 in (2.13 m)	260 lb (118 kg)	RS Fr	La Lumiere School	Bronx, New York
G	20	Billy Rayer	5 ft 11 in (1.8 m)	180 lb (82 kg)	So	Haverford School	Ardmore, Pennsylvania
F	21	Al Amadou	6 ft 9 in (2.06 m)	205 lb (93 kg)	RS So	Marquette	Philadelphia, Pennsylvania
C	22	Justice Ajogbor	6 ft 10 in (2.08 m)	260 lb (118 kg)	GS	Harvard	Benin City, Nigeria
G	23	Mekai Johnson	6 ft 5 in (1.96 m)	210 lb (95 kg)	So	Bishop Ireton High School	Upper Marlboro, Maryland
G/F	24	Will Lange	6 ft 4 in (1.93 m)	215 lb (98 kg)	Jr	Shipley School	Newtown Square, Pennsylvania

Head coach

- Steve Donahue (Ursinus)

Assistant coach(es)

- Bino Ranson (Southern New Hampshire)
- Dwayne Jones (Saint Joseph's)
- Thomas Boyle (Saint Joseph's)
- Chris Flegler (Livingstone)

Legend

- (C) Team captain
- (S) Suspended
- (I) Ineligible
- (W) Walk-on
- Injured
- Current redshirt

Roster
Last update: December 7, 2025

== Schedule and results ==
Date time, TV	Rank^{#}	Opponent^{#}	Result	Record	High points	High rebounds	High assists	Site (attendance) city, state
Exhibition
October 25, 2025*; 1:00 pm, ESPN+		Delaware	W 86–65	–	19 – Glover-Toscano	7 – Williford	5 – Jones II	Hagan Arena (1,788); Philadelphia, PA
Non-conference regular season
November 3, 2025*; 7:00 pm, ESPN+		Lafayette	W 85–76	1–0	23 – Glover-Toscano	9 – Glover-Toscano	5 – Simpson	Hagan Arena (2,516); Philadelphia, PA
November 8, 2025*; 1:00 pm, ESPN+		Drexel; Big 5 Classic Pod 2	W 76–65	2–0	29 – Jones II	7 – Simpson	2 – Tied	Hagan Arena (2,401); Philadelphia, PA
November 12, 2025*; 7:00 pm, ACCNX		at Virginia Tech	L 59–94	2–1	14 – Jones II	7 – Simpson	3 – Tied	Cassell Coliseum (5,246); Blacksburg, VA
November 17, 2025*; 7:00 pm, ESPN+/NBCSP		at Penn; Big 5 Classic Pod 2	L 74−83	2−2	24 – Jones II	8 – Glover-Toscano	5 – Tied	Palestra (2,387); Philadelphia, PA
November 20, 2025*; 10:00 pm, MWN		at UNLV	L 85−99	2−3	23 – Jones II	7 – Tied	8 – Jones II	Thomas & Mack Center (5,006); Paradise, NV
November 25, 2025*; 7:00 pm, ESPN+		Rutgers–Camden	W 100–61	3–3	16 – Tied	12 – Myers	8 – Simpson	Hagan Arena (1,603); Philadelphia, PA
November 30, 2025*; 1:00 pm, BallerTV		vs. Princeton; Jersey Jam	W 60–58	4–3	17 – Jones II	9 – Jones II	3 – Tied	CURE Insurance Arena (1,386); Trenton, NJ
December 6, 2025*; 4:30 pm, NBCSP		vs. Temple; Big 5 Classic 3rd Place Game	W 70–69	5–3	17 – Jones II	11 – Ajogbor	3 – Tied	Xfinity Mobile Arena; Philadelphia, PA
December 9, 2025*; 7:00 pm, ESPN+		Coppin State	W 87–65	6–3	25 – Glover-Toscano	7 – Ajogbor	9 – Simpson	Hagan Arena (1,694); Philadelphia, PA
December 11, 2025*; 9:00 pm, ACCN		at Syracuse	L 63–71	6–4	18 – Jones II	9 – Glover-Toscano	5 – Jones II	JMA Wireless Dome (12,584); Syracuse, NY
December 18, 2025*; 7:00 pm, ESPN+		Delaware State	W 67–51	7–4	14 – Williford	8 – Tied	3 – Tied	Hagan Arena (1,503); Philadelphia, PA
December 22, 2025*; 7:00 pm, ESPN+		Coastal Carolina	L 62–68	7–5	18 – Simpson	9 – Haskins	5 – Finkley	Hagan Arena (1,697); Philadelphia, PA
December 28, 2025*; 12:00 pm, ESPN+		Arcadia	W 87–65	8–5	29 – Glover-Toscano	8 – Williford	5 – Simpson	Hagan Arena (2,012); Philadelphia, PA
A-10 regular season
December 31, 2025; 4:00 pm, ESPN+		at Saint Louis	L 79–102	8–6 (0–1)	23 – Glover-Toscano	9 – Haskins	5 – Simpson	Chaifetz Arena (9,218); St. Louis, MO
January 3, 2026; 6:00 pm, CBSSN		Davidson	L 56–62	8–7 (0–2)	11 – Ajogbor	6 – Tied	3 – Tied	Hagan Arena (2,051); Philadelphia, PA
January 7, 2026; 7:00 pm, ESPN+		Duquesne	W 97–90 ^{OT}	9–7 (1–2)	28 – Glover-Toscano	10 – Haskins	11 – Simpson	Hagan Arena (1,532); Philadelphia, PA
January 11, 2026; 12:00 pm, USA		at Richmond	W 67–65	10–7 (2–2)	19 – Simpson	13 – Simpson	3 – Tied	Robins Center (5,230); Richmond, VA
January 14, 2026; 7:00 pm, ESPN+		St. Bonaventure	W 68–64	11–7 (3–2)	23 – Glover-Toscano	11 – Haskins	7 – Simpson	Hagan Arena (2,247); Philadelphia, PA
January 19, 2026; 3:00 pm, CBSSN		at VCU	L 72–79	11–8 (3–3)	27 – Simpson	9 – Ajogbor	4 – Simpson	Siegel Center (7,637); Richmond, VA
January 24, 2026; 6:00 pm, CBSSN		Dayton	W 81–74	12–8 (4–3)	20 – Tied	8 – Williford	9 – Simpson	Hagan Arena (3,047); Philadelphia, PA
January 27, 2026; 9:00 pm, CBSSN		at Loyola Chicago	W 85–64	13–8 (5–3)	17 – Williford	10 – Williford	10 – Simpson	Joseph J. Gentile Arena (2,129); Chicago, IL
January 31, 2026; 2:30 pm, USA		at La Salle	W 67–58	14–8 (6–3)	20 – Haskins	11 – Haskins	7 – Simpson	John Glaser Arena (2,755); Philadelphia, PA
February 4, 2026; 7:00 pm, ESPN+/NBCSP		George Washington	W 76–73	15–8 (7–3)	23 – Glover-Toscano	6 – Haskins	5 – Simpson	Hagan Arena (2,074); Philadelphia, PA
February 7, 2026; 4:00 pm, ESPN+		at George Mason	L 52–60	15–9 (7–4)	14 – Glover-Toscano	9 – Ajogbor	4 – Simpson	EagleBank Arena (7,335); Fairfax, VA
February 10, 2026; 7:00 pm, ESPN+		Fordham	L 64–68	15–10 (7–5)	19 – Williford	8 – Finkley	4 – Tied	Hagan Arena (2,332); Philadelphia, PA
February 18, 2026; 7:00 pm, ESPN+		at St. Bonaventure	W 71–65	16–10 (8–5)	23 – Simpson	9 – Ajogbor	7 – Simpson	Reilly Center (3,678); St. Bonaventure, NY
February 21, 2026; 12:00 pm, ESPN+		Loyola Chicago	W 75–61	17–10 (9–5)	23 – Tied	8 – Glover-Toscano	10 – Simpson	Hagan Arena (2,847); Philadelphia, PA
February 25, 2026; 7:00 pm, ESPN+/NBCSP+		George Mason	W 81–63	18–10 (10–5)	23 – Simpson	7 – Haskins	8 – Simpson	Hagan Arena (2,221); Philadelphia, PA
February 28, 2026; 12:00 pm, ESPN+		at Rhode Island	W 61–55	19–10 (11–5)	14 – Haskins	8 – Myers	5 – Simpson	Ryan Center (6,391); Kingston, RI
March 4, 2026; 7:00 pm, ESPN+		at Davidson	W 70–67	20–10 (12–5)	23 – Glover-Toscano	9 – Glover-Toscano	4 – Tied	John M. Belk Arena (2,775); Davidson, NC
March 7, 2026; 1:00 pm, ESPN+/NBCSP		La Salle	W 88–76	21–10 (13–5)	20 – Ajogbor	7 – Tied	9 – Simpson	Hagan Arena (2,504); Philadelphia, PA
A-10 tournament
March 13, 2026; 7:30 p.m., CNBC	(3)	vs. (6) Davidson; Quarterfinals	W 70–58	22–10	19 – Glover-Toscano	10 – Williford	6 – Simpson	PPG Paints Arena (8,114); Pittsburgh, PA
March 14, 2026; 3:30 p.m., CBSSN	(3)	vs. (2) VCU; Semifinals	L 64–77	22–11	17 – Williford	9 – Haskins	8 – Simpson	PPG Paints Arena (8,523); Pittsburgh, PA
NIT
March 18, 2026; 11:00 p.m., ESPNU		at (3 AL) Colorado State; First round	W 69–64	23–11	13 – Tied	9 – Simpson	3 – Tied	Moby Arena (1,332); Fort Collins, CO
March 22, 2026; 9:00 p.m., ESPNU		at (2 AL) California; Second round	W 76–75	24–11	24 – Glover-Toscano	11 – Haskins	7 – Simpson	Haas Pavilion (1,657); Berkeley, CA
March 24, 2026; 9:00 p.m., ESPN2		at (1 AL) New Mexico; Quarterfinals	L 69–84	24–12	26 – Simpson	8 – Myers	4 – Tied	The Pit (8,054); Albuquerque, NM
*Non-conference game. ^{#}Rankings from AP poll. (#) Tournament seedings in parentheses. AL=Alberquerque. All times are in Eastern.
