= 2025–26 Rutgers Scarlet Knights men's basketball team =

2025–26 Rutgers Scarlet Knights men's basketball

College Basketball Crown, Quarterfinal
- Conference: Big Ten Conference
- Record: 14–20 (6–14 Big Ten)
- Head coach: Steve Pikiell (10th season)
- Associate head coach: Brandin Knight
- Assistant coaches: T. J. Thompson; Marlon Williamson; Jay Young; Steve Hayn
- Home arena: Jersey Mike's Arena

2025–26 Big Ten Conference men's basketball standings
	Conf.				Overall
Team	W		L	PCT	W		L	PCT
No. 3 Michigan	19	–	1	.950	35	–	3	.921
No. 15 Nebraska	15	–	5	.750	28	–	7	.800
No. 13 Illinois	15	–	5	.750	28	–	8	.778
No. 11 Michigan State	15	–	5	.750	27	–	8	.771
No. 19 Wisconsin	14	–	6	.700	24	–	11	.686
No. 8 Purdue †	13	–	7	.650	30	–	9	.769
UCLA	13	–	7	.650	24	–	12	.667
Ohio State	12	–	8	.600	21	–	13	.618
Iowa	10	–	10	.500	24	–	13	.649
Indiana	9	–	11	.450	18	–	14	.563
Minnesota	8	–	12	.400	15	–	18	.455
USC	7	–	13	.350	18	–	14	.563
Washington	7	–	13	.350	16	–	17	.485
Rutgers	6	–	14	.300	14	–	20	.412
Northwestern	5	–	15	.250	15	–	19	.441
Oregon	5	–	15	.250	12	–	20	.375
Maryland	4	–	16	.200	12	–	21	.364
Penn State	3	–	17	.150	12	–	20	.375
† 2026 Big Ten tournament winner As of April 2, 2026; Rankings from AP poll

The 2025–26 Rutgers Scarlet Knights men's basketball team represented Rutgers University–New Brunswick during the 2025–26 NCAA Division I men's basketball season. The Scarlet Knights were led by 10th-year head coach Steve Pikiell and played their home games at Jersey Mike's Arena in Piscataway, New Jersey as members of the Big Ten Conference.

== Previous season ==
The Scarlet Knights finished the 2024–25 season 15–17, 8–12 in Big Ten play to finish in 11th place. They lost to USC in the first round of the Big Ten tournament. Following the team's loss, the school announced that they would not play in any postseason tournament.

== Offseason ==
=== Departures ===
Name	Number	Pos.	Height	Weight	Year	Hometown	Reason for Departure
Jordan Derkack	0	G	6'5"	205	Senior	Colonia, NJ	Transferred to Dayton
Tyson Acuff	5	G	6'4"	210	GS Senior	Detroit, MI	Graduated
Ace Bailey	1	F	6'8"	210	Freshman	Powder Springs, GA	Declared for 2025 NBA Draft, selected 5th overall by the Utah Jazz
Dylan Harper	3	G	6'5"	205	Freshman	Ramsey, NJ	Declared for 2025 NBA Draft, selected 2nd overall by San Antonio Spurs
PJ Hayes	23	F	6'6"	215	GS Senior	Waconia, MN	Graduated
Zach Martini	99	F	6'7"	235	GS Senior	Warren, New Jersey	Graduated
Lathan Sommerville	24	C	6'10"	275	Sophomore	Peoria, IL	Transferred to Washington

== Roster ==
2025–26 Rutgers Scarlet Knights men's basketball team
Players
Coaches

Pos.	#	Name	Height	Weight	Year	Previous school	Hometown
G	0	Tariq Francis	6 ft 1 in (1.85 m)	180 lb (82 kg)	Jr	NJIT	Pittsburgh, PA
G	1	Jamichael Davis (C)	6 ft 2 in (1.88 m)	180 lb (82 kg)	Jr	McEachern	Chattanooga, TN
G	2	Lino Mark	6 ft 2 in (1.88 m)	185 lb (84 kg)	Fr	Notre Dame	Los Angeles, CA
G	3	Kaden Powers	6 ft 4 in (1.93 m)	195 lb (88 kg)	Fr	Rainier Beach	Seattle, WA
F	4	Bryce Dortch	6 ft 9 in (2.06 m)	210 lb (95 kg)	So	Brimmer and May	Somerville, MA
G	5	Darren Buchanan Jr.	6 ft 7 in (2.01 m)	235 lb (107 kg)	RS Jr	George Washington / Virginia Tech	Washington, D.C.
F	9	Dylan Grant	6 ft 8 in (2.03 m)	220 lb (100 kg)	So	Michigan Collegiate High School	Mississauga, Canada
F	11	Chris Nwuli	6 ft 8 in (2.03 m)	205 lb (93 kg)	Fr	Dynamic Prep	North Las Vegas, NV
G	13	Harun Zrno	6 ft 7 in (2.01 m)	220 lb (100 kg)	Fr	KK Slavija	Sarajevo
C	15	Gevonte Ware	6 ft 9 in (2.06 m)	255 lb (116 kg)	Fr	1 of 1 Academy Center	Roosevelt, NY
C	21	Emmanuel Ogbole	6 ft 10 in (2.08 m)	260 lb (118 kg)	Sr	Monroe College	Aune-Adoka, Nigeria
G	22	Dorian Jones	6 ft 4 in (1.93 m)	160 lb (73 kg)	RS Fr	Richmond Heights	Cleveland, OH
G	24	Max Fradkin (W)	5 ft 11 in (1.8 m)	170 lb (77 kg)	So	The Taft School	Southbury, CT
F	27	Denis Bădălău	6 ft 8 in (2.03 m)	200 lb (91 kg)	Fr	Centro Studi Alessandro Manzoni	Giurgiu, Romania
C	32	Baye Fall	6 ft 11 in (2.11 m)	205 lb (93 kg)	Jr	Kansas State / Arkansas	Guédiawaye, Senegal

Head coach

- Steve Pikiell (Connecticut)

Assistant coach(es)

- Brandin Knight (Pittsburgh)
- T. J. Thompson (George Washington)
- Marlon Williamson (Youngstown State)
- Jay Young (Marist)
- Steve Hayn (Stony Brook)

Legend

- (C) Team captain
- (S) Suspended
- (I) Ineligible
- (W) Walk-on
- Injured
- Current redshirt

Roster

== Schedule and results ==
Date time, TV	Rank^{#}	Opponent^{#}	Result	Record	High points	High rebounds	High assists	Site (attendance) city, state
Regular season
November 5, 2025*; 6:00 p.m., BTN		Rider	W 81–53	1–0	20 – Francis	10 – Ogbole	3 – Davis	Jersey Mike's Arena (8,000); Piscataway, NJ
November 10, 2025*; 6:30 p.m., BTN		Maine	W 72–60	2–0	19 – Bădălău	10 – Grant	5 – Buchanan Jr.	Jersey Mike's Arena (8,000); Piscataway, NJ
November 14, 2025*; 6:30 p.m., B1G+		Lehigh	W 84–72	3–0	28 – Grant	10 – Ogbole	4 – Francis	Jersey Mike's Arena (8,000); Piscataway, NJ
November 18, 2025*; 6:30 p.m., BTN		American	W 80–71	4–0	22 – Grant	11 – Grant	5 – Davis	Jersey Mike's Arena (8,000); Piscataway, NJ
November 21, 2025*; 6:30 p.m., B1G+		Central Connecticut State	L 54–67	4–1	19 – Francis	10 – Ogbole	3 – Tied	Jersey Mike's Arena (8,000); Piscataway, NJ
November 24, 2025*; 1:00 p.m., TNT		vs. No. 17 Tennessee; Players Era Festival Game 1	L 60–85	4–2	14 – Zrno	6 – Ogbole	2 – Tied	MGM Grand Garden Arena; Paradise, NV
November 25, 2025*; 1:00 p.m., TNT		vs. Notre Dame; Players Era Festival Game 2	L 63–68	4–3	21 – Davis	7 – Grant	3 – Davis	MGM Grand Garden Arena; Paradise, NV
November 27, 2025*; 4:30 p.m., TruTV		vs. UNLV; Players Era Festival Consolation Game	W 80–65	5–3	21 – Ogbole	13 – Ogbole	6 – Davis	MGM Grand Garden Arena; Paradise, NV
December 2, 2025; 8:00 p.m., FS1		No. 1 Purdue	L 65−81	5−4 (0−1)	13 – Tied	6 – Ogbole	5 – Davis	Jersey Mike's Arena (8,000); Piscataway, NJ
December 6, 2025; 4:00 p.m., BTN		at No. 3 Michigan	L 60−101	5−5 (0−2)	13 – Tied	7 – Grant	3 – Francis	Crisler Center (12,707); Ann Arbor, MI
December 13, 2025*; 8:00 p.m., FS1		at Seton Hall; Garden State Hardwood Classic	L 59–81	5–6	15 – Zrno	8 – Ogbole	2 – Tied	Prudential Center (11,153); Newark, NJ
December 20, 2025*; 8:00 p.m., BTN		Penn	W 70–69	6–6	34 – Francis	9 – Dortch	4 – Buchanan Jr.	Jersey Mike's Arena (8,000); Piscataway, NJ
December 29, 2025*; 7:00 p.m., BTN		Delaware State	W 65–50	7–6	19 – Francis	12 – Ogbole	2 – Grant	Jersey Mike's Arena (8,000); Piscataway, NJ
January 2, 2026; 8:00 p.m., Peacock		Ohio State	L 73–80	7–7 (0–3)	17 – Francis	9 – Ogbole	3 – Tied	Jersey Mike's Arena (8,000); Piscataway, NJ
January 5, 2026; 7:00 p.m., Peacock		Oregon	W 88–85 ^{OT}	8–7 (1–3)	30 – Francis	5 – Tied	4 – Francis	Jersey Mike's Arena (8,000); Piscataway, NJ
January 8, 2026; 8:30 p.m., BTN		at No. 16 Illinois	L 55–81	8–8 (1–4)	12 – Powers	5 – Tied	3 – Davis	State Farm Center (13,190); Champaign, IL
January 11, 2026; 5:00 p.m., Peacock		Northwestern	W 77–75 ^{OT}	9–8 (2–4)	30 – Francis	10 – Buchanan Jr.	4 – Davis	Jersey Mike's Arena (8,000); Piscataway, NJ
January 17, 2026; 2:00 p.m., BTN		at Wisconsin	L 87–96	9–9 (2–5)	21 – Zrno	9 – Ogbole	5 – Powers	Kohl Center (15,140); Madison, WI
January 20, 2026; 8:30 p.m., BTN		at Iowa	L 62–68	9–10 (2–6)	17 – Buchanan Jr.	10 – Ogbole	3 – Powers	Carver-Hawkeye Arena (9,778); Iowa City, IA
January 23, 2026; 6:00 p.m., FS1		Indiana	L 59–82	9–11 (2–7)	28 – Francis	7 – Ogbole	3 – Francis	Jersey Mike's Arena (8,000); Piscataway, NJ
January 27, 2026; 6:30 p.m., FS1		No. 7 Michigan State	L 79–88 ^{OT}	9–12 (2–8)	23 – Francis	4 – Tied	5 – Davis	Jersey Mike's Arena (8,000); Piscataway, NJ
January 31, 2026; 7:00 p.m., Peacock/NBCSN		at USC	L 75–78	9–13 (2–9)	26 – Francis	10 – Grant	5 – Francis	Galen Center (5,322); Los Angeles, CA
February 3, 2026; 9:30 p.m., BTN		at UCLA	L 66–98	9–14 (2–10)	18 – Powers	5 – Ogbole	3 – Buchanan Jr.	Pauley Pavilion (5,307); Los Angeles, CA
February 7, 2026; 12:00 p.m., BTN		No. 9 Nebraska	L 68–80	9–15 (2–11)	16 – Francis	6 – Ogbole	5 – Francis	Jersey Mike's Arena (8,000); Piscataway, NJ
February 15, 2026; 12:00 p.m., FS1		Maryland	W 68–57	10–15 (3–11)	21 – Francis	9 – Ogbole	4 – Francis	Jersey Mike's Arena (8,000); Piscataway, NJ
February 18, 2026; 6:00 p.m., BTN		at Penn State	W 85–72	11–15 (4–11)	22 – Francis	6 – Ogbole	7 – Francis	Bryce Jordan Center (6,230); University Park, PA
February 21, 2026; 12:00 p.m., BTN		at Minnesota	L 61–80	11–16 (4–12)	16 – Mark	5 – Tied	5 – Francis	Williams Arena (9,017); Minneapolis, MN
February 24, 2026; 6:30 p.m., BTN		Washington	L 72–79	11–17 (4–13)	18 – Mark	6 – Davis	2 – Tied	Jersey Mike's Arena (8,000); Piscataway, NJ
March 1, 2026; 12:00 p.m., FS1		at Maryland	W 69–65	12–17 (5–13)	19 – Francis	7 – Buchanan Jr.	4 – Francis	XFINITY Center (12,237); College Park, MD
March 5, 2026; 8:00 p.m., FS1		at No. 8 Michigan State	L 87–91	12–18 (5–14)	25 – Francis	6 – Tied	5 – Francis	Breslin Center (14,797); East Lansing, MI
March 8, 2026; 12:00 p.m., BTN		Penn State	W 74–62	13–18 (6–14)	18 – Francis	13 – Buchanan	4 – Davis	Jersey Mike's Arena (8,000); Piscataway, NJ
Big Ten tournament
March 11, 2026; 9:00 p.m., BTN	(14)	vs. (11) Minnesota; Second round	W 72–67	14–18	29 – Francis	7 – Ogbole	7 – Buchanan Jr.	United Center (16,122); Chicago, IL
March 12, 2026; 9:00 p.m., BTN	(14)	vs. (6) UCLA; Third round	L 59–72	14–19	17 – Mark	9 – Buchanan Jr.	5 – Tied	United Center (16,861); Chicago, IL
College Basketball Crown
April 2, 2026*; 10:30 p.m., FS1		Creighton; Quarterfinal	L 69–82	14–20	19 – Francis	7 – Tied	3 – Tied	MGM Grand Garden Arena; Paradise, NV
*Non-conference game. ^{#}Rankings from AP Poll. (#) Tournament seedings in parentheses. All times are in Eastern Time.
