= 2025–26 Loyola Greyhounds men's basketball team =

American college basketball season

2025–26 Loyola Greyhounds men's basketball
- Conference: Patriot League
- Record: 12–20 (8–10 Patriot)
- Head coach: Josh Loeffler (2nd season)
- Assistant coaches: Matt Blue; Kevin Farrell; Ricky Hernandez; Khyle Diaz
- Home arena: Reitz Arena

2025–26 Patriot League men's basketball standings
| | Conf. | | | | Overall |
| Team | W | | L | PCT | W | | L | PCT |
|---|---|---|---|---|---|---|---|---|
| Navy | 17 | – | 1 | .944 | 25 | – | 6 | .806 |
| Lehigh | 11 | – | 7 | .611 | 15 | – | 16 | .484 |
| Colgate | 11 | – | 7 | .611 | 17 | – | 14 | .548 |
| Boston University | 10 | – | 8 | .556 | 15 | – | 16 | .484 |
| American | 9 | – | 9 | .500 | 16 | – | 15 | .516 |
| Loyola | 8 | – | 10 | .444 | 12 | – | 19 | .387 |
| Lafayette | 8 | – | 10 | .444 | 11 | – | 21 | .344 |
| Bucknell | 6 | – | 12 | .333 | 10 | – | 22 | .313 |
| Army | 5 | – | 13 | .278 | 11 | – | 21 | .344 |
| Holy Cross | 5 | – | 13 | .278 | 11 | – | 21 | .344 |
† 2026 Patriot League tournament winner As of March 3, 2026

The 2025–26 Loyola Greyhounds men's basketball team represented Loyola University Maryland during the 2025–26 NCAA Division I men's basketball season. The Greyhounds, led by second-year head coach Josh Loeffler, played their home games at Reitz Arena in Baltimore, Maryland as members of the Patriot League.

== Previous season ==
The Greyhounds finished the 2024–25 season 12–19, 6–12 in Patriot League play, to finish in a tie for eighth place. They defeated Lehigh, before falling to top-seeded Bucknell in the quarterfinals of the Patriot League tournament.

== Preseason ==
On October 15, 2025, the Patriot League released their preseason poll. Loyola was picked to finish sixth in the conference.

=== Preseason rankings ===
Patriot League Preseason Poll
| Place | Team | Points |
|---|---|---|
| 1 | Navy | 79 (7) |
| 2 | Boston University | 73 (2) |
| 3 | Colgate | 64 (1) |
| 4 | American | 47 |
| 5 | Bucknell | 44 |
| 6 | Loyola (MD) | 39 |
| 7 | Lafayette | 36 |
| 8 | Lehigh | 30 |
| 9 | Holy Cross | 23 |
| 10 | Army | 15 |
(#) first-place votes

=== Preseason All-Patriot League Team ===
Preseason All-Patriot League Team
| Player | Year | Position |
|---|---|---|
| Jacob Theodosiou | Junior | Guard |

== Roster ==
2025–26 Loyola Greyhounds men's basketball team
Players
Coaches

| Pos. | # | Name | Height | Weight | Year | Previous school | Hometown |
|---|---|---|---|---|---|---|---|
| G | 0 | Braeden Speed | 6 ft 3 in (1.91 m) | 190 lb (86 kg) | So | Brophy Prep | Phoenix, Arizona |
| G | 1 | Carter Berg-McLean | 6 ft 4 in (1.93 m) | 197 lb (89 kg) | Fr | Georgetown Prep | Wellington, New Zealand |
| G | 2 | Troy Cicero Jr. | 6 ft 2 in (1.88 m) | 185 lb (84 kg) | Jr | Romeoville High School | Joliet, Illinois |
| G | 3 | Jordan Stiemke | 6 ft 5 in (1.96 m) | 213 lb (97 kg) | Jr | Loomis Chaffee School | Bel Air, Maryland |
| G | 5 | Peter Sposito | 6 ft 2 in (1.88 m) | 185 lb (84 kg) | Sr | Choate Rosemary Hall | Glastonbury, Connecticut |
| G | 6 | Jacob Theodosiou | 6 ft 4 in (1.93 m) | 204 lb (93 kg) | Jr | Wyoming | Waterloo, Ontario |
| F | 7 | Jonas Sirtautas | 6 ft 10 in (2.08 m) | 205 lb (93 kg) | Jr | Wyoming | Kaunas, Lithuania |
| F | 8 | Goap Kodi | 6 ft 10 in (2.08 m) | 225 lb (102 kg) | So | Georgetown Prep | Woodbridge, Virginia |
| G | 13 | Ben Menker (W) | 6 ft 5 in (1.96 m) | 202 lb (92 kg) | So | William Mason High School | Mason, Ohio |
| G | 14 | Garrett Brennan | 6 ft 4 in (1.93 m) | 198 lb (90 kg) | Sr | St. Stephen's & St. Agnes School | Reston, Virginia |
| G | 15 | Tyson Commander | 6 ft 4 in (1.93 m) | 202 lb (92 kg) | Sr | The John Carroll School | Belcamp, Maryland |
| F | 17 | Everett Barnes | 6 ft 9 in (2.06 m) | 240 lb (109 kg) | Fr | Father Judge High School | Burlington, New Jersey |
| F | 18 | Emmett Adair | 6 ft 9 in (2.06 m) | 230 lb (104 kg) | Fr | NBA Global Academy | Sydney, Australia |
| F | 22 | Sam Springer | 6 ft 7 in (2.01 m) | 223 lb (101 kg) | So | Air Force | Cleveland, Ohio |
| G | 24 | Sebastien Emenalo | 6 ft 6 in (1.98 m) | 195 lb (88 kg) | Fr | NBA Global Academy | Walton-on-Thames, England |

Head coach

- Josh Loeffler (Swarthmore)

Assistant coach(es)

- Matt Blue (St. Lawrence)
- Kevin Farrell (Loyola (MD))
- Ricky Hernandez (West Chester)
- Khyle Diaz (Keystone)

Legend

- (C) Team captain
- (S) Suspended
- (I) Ineligible
- (W) Walk-on
- Injured
- Current redshirt

Roster
Last update: November 26, 2025

== Schedule and results ==
| Date time, TV | Rank^{#} | Opponent^{#} | Result | Record | Site (attendance) city, state |
Non-conference regular season
| November 3, 2025*; 9:00 pm, MNMT2 | | vs. Towson; Hall of Fame Series Baltimore | L 56–67 | 0–1 | CFG Bank Arena (3,167); Baltimore, MD |
| November 6, 2025*; 11:30 am, ESPN+ | | Penn State Abington | W 96–60 | 1–1 | Reitz Arena (768); Baltimore, MD |
| November 11, 2025*; 7:00 pm, ESPN+ | | NJIT | L 64–66 | 1–2 | Reitz Arena (914); Baltimore, MD |
| November 15, 2025*; 2:00 pm, ESPN+ | | vs. Stonehill; Mahoney Classic | W 74–63 | 2–2 | Leo D. Mahoney Arena (202); Fairfield, CT |
| November 16, 2025*; 2:00 pm, ESPN+ | | at Fairfield; Mahoney Classic | L 82–85 | 2–3 | Leo D. Mahoney Arena (1,915); Fairfield, CT |
| November 19, 2025*; 7:00 pm, ESPN+ | | at Duquesne | L 78–92 | 2–4 | Cooper Fieldhouse (2,135); Pittsburgh, PA |
| November 21, 2025*; 7:00 pm, SECN+ | | at No. 12 Kentucky | L 46–88 | 2–5 | Rupp Arena (19,764); Lexington, KY |
| November 25, 2025*; 6:00 pm, ESPN+ | | Washington (MD) | W 101–51 | 3–5 | Reitz Arena (432); Baltimore, MD |
| November 30, 2025*; 6:00 pm, ESPN+ | | Coppin State | W 95–84 | 4–5 | Reitz Arena (517); Baltimore, MD |
| December 3, 2025*; 7:00 pm, MNMT/FloCollege | | at Hampton | L 71–93 | 4–6 | Hampton Convocation Center (775); Hampton, VA |
| December 9, 2025*; 6:00 pm, ESPN+ | | at VMI | L 70–86 | 4–7 | Cameron Hall (2,831); Lexington, VA |
| December 13, 2025*; 6:00 pm, ESPN+ | | Mount St. Mary's | L 73–81 | 4–8 | Reitz Arena (842); Baltimore, MD |
| December 21, 2025*; 2:00 pm, ESPN+ | | at George Mason | L 79–86 | 4–9 | EagleBank Arena (2,721); Fairfax, VA |
Patriot League regular season
| December 31, 2025; 1:00 pm, ESPN+ | | at American | L 69–84 | 4–10 (0–1) | Bender Arena (781); Washington, D.C. |
| January 3, 2026; 5:00 pm, ESPN+ | | Lafayette | L 64–79 | 4–11 (0–2) | Reitz Arena (524); Baltimore, MD |
| January 7, 2026; 6:00 pm, ESPN+ | | at Army | W 84–76 | 5–11 (1–2) | Christl Arena (643); West Point, NY |
| January 10, 2026; 5:00 pm, ESPN+ | | at Bucknell | L 67–70 | 5–12 (1–3) | Sojka Pavilion (1,582); Lewisburg, PA |
| January 14, 2026; 7:00 pm, ESPN+ | | Colgate | L 80–86 | 5–13 (1–4) | Reitz Arena (1,012); Baltimore, MD |
| January 17, 2026; 1:00 pm, ESPN+ | | Boston University | W 74–57 | 6–13 (2–4) | Reitz Arena (642); Baltimore, MD |
| January 19, 2026; 7:00 pm, CBSSN | | at Lehigh | L 81–88 | 6–14 (2–5) | Stabler Arena (765); Bethlehem, PA |
| January 24, 2026; 5:00 pm, ESPN+ | | Bucknell | W 67–62 | 7–14 (3–5) | Reitz Arena (1,167); Baltimore, MD |
| January 28, 2026; 7:00 pm, ESPN+ | | American | W 77–68 | 8–14 (4–5) | Reitz Arena (684); Baltimore, MD |
| January 31, 2026; 4:00 pm, ESPN+ | | at Navy | L 71–87 | 8–15 (4–6) | Alumni Hall (2,417); Annapolis, MD |
| February 4, 2026; 7:00 pm, ESPN+ | | Lehigh | W 89–84 ^{2OT} | 9–15 (5–6) | Reitz Arena (932); Baltimore, MD |
| February 7, 2026; 1:00 pm, ESPN+ | | at Boston University | L 69–78 | 9–16 (5–7) | Case Gym (864); Boston, MA |
| February 11, 2026; 7:00 pm, ESPN+ | | at Lafayette | W 68–54 | 10–16 (6–7) | Kirby Sports Center (1,446); Easton, PA |
| February 15, 2026; 1:00 pm, ESPN+ | | Holy Cross | W 83–73 | 11–16 (7–7) | Reitz Arena (1,202); Baltimore, MD |
| February 18, 2026; 7:00 pm, ESPN+ | | Army | L 77–87 | 11–17 (7–8) | Reitz Arena (679); Baltimore, MD |
| February 21, 2026; 2:00 pm, ESPN+ | | at Colgate | L 98–101 ^{OT} | 11–18 (7–9) | Cotterell Court (706); Hamilton, NY |
| February 25, 2026; 7:00 pm, ESPN+ | | Navy | L 51–78 | 11–19 (7–10) | Reitz Arena (714); Baltimore, MD |
| February 28, 2026; 2:00 pm, ESPN+ | | at Holy Cross | W 76–62 | 12–19 (8–10) | Hart Center (1,066); Worcester, MA |
Patriot League tournament
| March 5, 2026; 7:00 pm, ESPN+ | (6) | at (3) Colgate; Quarterfinals | L 77–90 | 12–20 | Cotterell Court (1,133); Hamilton, NY |
*Non-conference game. ^{#}Rankings from AP Poll. (#) Tournament seedings in parentheses. All times are in Eastern.
