= 2025–26 Colgate Raiders men's basketball team =

American college basketball season

2025–26 Colgate Raiders men's basketball
- Conference: Patriot League
- Record: 18–15 (11–7 Patriot)
- Head coach: Matt Langel (15th season)
- Assistant coaches: Trey Montgomery; Pat Moore; Kaylin Johnson; Patrick Stasiak
- Home arena: Cotterell Court

2025–26 Patriot League men's basketball standings
	Conf.				Overall
Team	W		L	PCT	W		L	PCT
Navy	17	–	1	.944	26	–	7	.788
Lehigh †	11	–	7	.611	18	–	16	.529
Colgate	11	–	7	.611	18	–	15	.545
Boston University	10	–	8	.556	17	–	17	.500
American	9	–	9	.500	16	–	16	.500
Loyola	8	–	10	.444	12	–	20	.375
Lafayette	8	–	10	.444	11	–	21	.344
Bucknell	6	–	12	.333	10	–	23	.303
Army	5	–	13	.278	11	–	21	.344
Holy Cross	5	–	13	.278	11	–	22	.333
† 2026 Patriot League tournament winner As of March 11, 2026

The 2025–26 Colgate Raiders men's basketball team represented Colgate University in the 2025–26 NCAA Division I men's basketball season. The Raiders, led by 15th-year head coach Matt Langel, played their home games at Cotterell Court located in Hamilton, New York as members of the Patriot League. Colgate finished the regular season with an overall record of 17–14 and a conference record of 11–7, good for third in the Patriot League standings. Colgate defeated Loyola (MD) in the quarterfinals of the conference tournament before Lehigh defeated the Raiders in the semifinals.

== Previous season ==
The Raiders finished the 2024–25 season 14–19, 10–8 in Patriot League play to finish in a tie for third place. They defeated Army in the quarterfinals of the Patriot League tournament before losing to American in the semifinals. As a result, and for the first time since 2018, the Raiders failed to qualify for the NCAA tournament.

== Preseason ==
On October 15, 2025, the Patriot League released their preseason poll. Colgate was picked to finish third in the conference, while receiving one first-place vote.

=== Preseason rankings ===
Patriot League Preseason Poll
Place	Team	Points
1	Navy	79 (7)
2	Boston University	73 (2)
3	Colgate	64 (1)
4	American	47
5	Bucknell	44
6	Loyola (MD)	39
7	Lafayette	36
8	Lehigh	30
9	Holy Cross	23
10	Army	15
(#) first-place votes

=== Preseason All-Patriot League Team ===
Preseason All-Patriot League Team
Player	Year	Position
Jalen Cox	Junior	Guard

== Roster ==
2025–26 Colgate Raiders men's basketball team
Players
Coaches

Pos.	#	Name	Height	Weight	Year	Previous school	Hometown
F	0	Ethan Brown	6 ft 10 in (2.08 m)	225 lb (102 kg)	So	Orangeville Prep	Peterborough, Ontario
G	1	Brady Cummins	6 ft 6 in (1.98 m)	195 lb (88 kg)	Sr	Brooks School	York, Maine
G	2	Blake Forrest	5 ft 11 in (1.8 m)	175 lb (79 kg)	So	Mount Si High School	North Bend, Washington
G	3	Jalen Cox	6 ft 3 in (1.91 m)	180 lb (82 kg)	Jr	South Kent School	Los Angeles, California
G	4	Josh Ahayere	6 ft 3 in (1.91 m)	215 lb (98 kg)	So	Crestwood Prep	Morinville, Alberta
G	5	Charlie Pugh	6 ft 4 in (1.93 m)	190 lb (86 kg)	Fr	Brewster Academy	Greenwood Village, Colorado
G	6	Ben Tweedy	6 ft 4 in (1.93 m)	185 lb (84 kg)	So	Green Bay	Rockhampton, Australia
G	7	Stevie Clark	6 ft 6 in (1.98 m)	200 lb (91 kg)	So	Oshkosh North High School	Omro, Wisconsin
G	8	Jonathan Niv	6 ft 5 in (1.96 m)	190 lb (86 kg)	Fr	Suffield Academy	Fairfield, Connecticut
F	9	Cameron Brennan	7 ft 0 in (2.13 m)	250 lb (113 kg)	So	Polaris Prep	Burlington, Ontario
G	10	Parker Jones	6 ft 7 in (2.01 m)	210 lb (95 kg)	Jr	Worcester Academy	Sherman Oaks, California
G	13	Kyle Carlesimo	6 ft 2 in (1.88 m)	190 lb (86 kg)	Sr	Eastern Illinois	Seattle, Washington
F	15	Ayomi Odetoyinbo	6 ft 10 in (2.08 m)	220 lb (100 kg)	Fr	Our Saviour Lutheran School	Canton, New York
F	22	Andrew Alekseyenko	6 ft 8 in (2.03 m)	230 lb (104 kg)	Fr	Rivers School	Brookline, Massachusetts
F	23	Cooper Wright	6 ft 5 in (1.96 m)	200 lb (91 kg)	Jr	Saint Sebastian's School	Cambridge, Massachusetts
F	33	Sam Wright	6 ft 9 in (2.06 m)	235 lb (107 kg)	Jr	Spain Park High School	Hoover, Alabama

Head coach

- Matt Langel (Penn)

Assistant coach(es)

- Trey Montgomery (Samford)
- Pat Moore (Colgate)
- Kaylin Johnson (Samford)
- Patrick Stasiak (SUNY Cortland)

Legend

- (C) Team captain
- (S) Suspended
- (I) Ineligible
- (W) Walk-on
- Injured
- Current redshirt

Roster
Last update: November 24, 2025

== Schedule and results ==
Date time, TV	Rank^{#}	Opponent^{#}	Result	Record	Site (attendance) city, state
Non-conference regular season
November 3, 2025*; 7:00 pm, BIG+		at No. 22 Michigan State	L 69–80	0–1	Breslin Center (14,797); East Lansing, MI
November 7, 2025*; 5:00 pm, ESPN+		Northeastern	L 65–68	0–2	Cotterell Court (766); Hamilton, NY
November 11, 2025*; 7:00 pm, ESPN+		Drexel	W 90–83	1–2	Cotterell Court (643); Hamilton, NY
November 14, 2025*; 9:00 pm, B1G+		at No. 14 Illinois	L 65–84	1–3	State Farm Center (15,544); Champaign, IL
November 17, 2025*; 7:00 pm, ESPN+		at Siena	W 72–69	2–3	MVP Arena (4,078); Albany, NY
November 20, 2025*; 7:00 pm, ESPN+		at Cornell	L 94–95 ^{2OT}	2–4	Newman Arena (744); Ithaca, NY
November 28, 2025*; 7:30 pm		vs. Albany; Northern Classic	W 69–67	3–4	Place Bell (1,738); Montreal, Canada
November 29, 2025*; 5:00 pm		vs. SUNY Oneonta; Northern Classic	W 85–50	4–4	Place Bell (1,738); Montreal, Canada
November 30, 2025*; 3:30 pm		vs. Fordham; Northern Classic	W 72–62	5–4	Place Bell (1,767); Montreal, Canada
December 6, 2025*; 2:00 pm, ESPN+		St. John Fisher	W 94–50	6–4	Cotterell Court (594); Hamilton, NY
December 10, 2025*; 7:00 pm, ESPN+		at St. Bonaventure	L 77−85	6−5	Reilly Center (3,049); St. Bonaventure, NY
December 21, 2025*; 12:00 pm, SECN+		at No. 23т Florida	L 60−90	6−6	O'Connell Center (10,189); Gainesville, FL
December 28, 2025*; 2:00 pm, ESPN+		Harvard	L 69–78	6–7	Cotterell Court (781); Hamilton, NY
Patriot League regular season
December 31, 2025; 3:00 pm, ESPN+		at Lafayette	W 85–77	7–7 (1–0)	Kirby Sports Center (1,278); Easton, PA
January 3, 2026; 1:00 pm, ESPN+		at Army	W 76–69	8–7 (2–0)	Christl Arena (1,073); West Point, NY
January 7, 2026; 7:00 pm, ESPN+		American	W 64–62	9–7 (3–0)	Cotterell Court (552); Hamilton, NY
January 10, 2026; 2:00 pm, ESPN+		Lehigh	L 77–78	9–8 (3–1)	Cotterell Court (577); Hamilton, NY
January 14, 2026; 7:00 pm, ESPN+		at Loyola (MD)	W 86–80	10–8 (4–1)	Reitz Arena (1,012); Baltimore, MD
January 17, 2026; 2:00 pm, ESPN+		Bucknell	W 95–76	11–8 (5–1)	Cotterell Court (596); Hamilton, NY
January 21, 2026; 7:00 pm, ESPN+		at American	L 66–70	11–9 (5–2)	Bender Arena (912); Washington, D.C.
January 24, 2026; 2:00 pm, ESPN+		Boston University	W 80–79 ^{OT}	12–9 (6–2)	Cotterell Court (739); Hamilton, NY
January 28, 2026; 7:00 pm, ESPN+		Holy Cross	W 79–74	13–9 (7–2)	Cotterell Court (500); Hamilton, NY
January 31, 2026; 2:00 pm, ESPN+		at Lehigh	L 76–77 ^{OT}	13–10 (7–3)	Stabler Arena (939); Bethlehem, PA
February 4, 2026; 7:00 pm, ESPN+		Army	W 69−55	14−10 (8−3)	Cotterell Court; Hamilton, NY
February 7, 2026; 5:00 pm, ESPN+		at Bucknell	W 78–59	15–10 (9–3)	Sojka Pavilion (1,269); Lewisburg, PA
February 11, 2026; 6:00 pm, ESPN+		at Holy Cross	W 74–70	16–10 (10–3)	Hart Center (1,122); Worcester, MA
February 14, 2026; 12:00 pm, CBSSN		Navy	L 80–84 ^{OT}	16–11 (10–4)	Cotterell Court; Hamilton, NY
February 16, 2026; 6:00 pm, CBSSN		at Boston University	L 58–85	16–12 (10–5)	Case Gym (1,590); Boston, MA
February 21, 2026; 2:00 pm, ESPN+		Loyola (MD)	W 101–98 ^{OT}	17–12 (11–5)	Cotterell Court (706); Hamilton, NY
February 25, 2026; 7:00 pm, ESPN+		Lafayette	L 69–70	17–13 (11–6)	Cotterell Court (608); Hamilton, NY
February 28, 2026; 4:00 pm, ESPN+		at Navy	L 69–85	17–14 (11–7)	Alumni Hall (2,428); Annapolis, MD
Patriot League tournament
March 5, 2026; 7:00 p.m., ESPN+	(3)	(6) Loyola (MD); Quarterfinals	W 90–77	18–14	Cotterell Court (1,133); Hamilton, NY
March 8, 2026; 2:00 p.m., CBSSN	(3)	at (2) Lehigh; Semifinals	L 69–76	18–15	Stabler Arena (1,683); Bethlehem, PA
*Non-conference game. ^{#}Rankings from AP Poll. (#) Tournament seedings in parentheses. All times are in Eastern.
