= 2026 Patriot League men's basketball tournament =

American college basketball tournament

- Classification: Division I
- Season: 2025–26
- Teams: 10
- Site: Campus sites
- Champions: Lehigh (4th title)
- Winning coach: Brett Reed (3rd title)
- MVP: Nasir Whitlock (Lehigh)
- Attendance: 14,111 (total); 4,323 (championship)
- Television: ESPN+, CBSSN

2025–26 Patriot League men's basketball standings
	Conf.				Overall
Team	W		L	PCT	W		L	PCT
Navy	17	–	1	.944	26	–	8	.765
Lehigh †	11	–	7	.611	18	–	17	.514
Colgate	11	–	7	.611	18	–	15	.545
Boston University	10	–	8	.556	17	–	17	.500
American	9	–	9	.500	16	–	16	.500
Loyola	8	–	10	.444	12	–	20	.375
Lafayette	8	–	10	.444	11	–	21	.344
Bucknell	6	–	12	.333	10	–	23	.303
Army	5	–	13	.278	11	–	21	.344
Holy Cross	5	–	13	.278	11	–	22	.333
† 2026 Patriot League tournament winner

The 2026 Patriot League Men's Basketball Tournament was the conference postseason tournament for the Patriot League. The tournament was held March 3–11, 2026 at campus sites of the higher seeds. The winner, Lehigh, received the conference's automatic bid to the NCAA Tournament.

== Seeds ==
All ten teams in the conference standings qualified for the tournament. The teams were seeded by record in conference, with a tiebreaker system to seed teams with identical conference records.

The two tiebreakers used by the Patriot League are: 1) head-to-head record of teams with identical record 2) a comparison of records between the tied institutions starting at the highest possible seed and continuing until the tie is broken, and 3) NCAA NET Rankings available on day following the conclusion of Patriot League regular season play.

Seed	School	Conference	Tiebreaker
1	Navy	17–1	
2	Lehigh	11–7	2–0 vs. Colgate
3	Colgate	11–7	0–2 vs. Lehigh
4	Boston University	10–8	
5	American	9–9	
6	Loyola	8–10	1–1 vs. Lehigh
7	Lafayette	8–10	0–2 vs. Lehigh
8	Bucknell	6–12	
9	Army	5–13	2–0 vs. Lehigh
10	Holy Cross	5–13	1–1 vs. Lehigh

== Schedule ==
Game	Time	Matchup	Score	Television	Attendance
First round – Tuesday, March 3
1	7:00 p.m.	No. 10 Holy Cross at No. 7 Lafayette	82–77	ESPN+	1,434
2	7:00 p.m.	No. 9 Army at No. 8 Bucknell	55–65	ESPN+	606
Quarterfinals – Thursday, March 5
3	7:00 p.m.	No. 8 Bucknell at No. 1 Navy	69–74	ESPN+	1,209
4	7:00 p.m.	No. 10 Holy Cross at No. 2 Lehigh	66–69	ESPN+	1,350
5	7:00 p.m.	No. 6 Loyola at No. 3 Colgate	77–90	ESPN+	1,133
6	7:00 p.m.	No. 5 American at No. 4 Boston University	73–75	ESPN+	651
Semifinals – Sunday, March 8
7	12:00 p.m.	No. 3 Colgate at No. 2 Lehigh	69–76	CBSSN	1,683
8	2:00 p.m.	No. 4 Boston University at No. 1 Navy	73–72	CBSSN	1,722
Championship – Wednesday, March 11
9	7:00 p.m.	No. 4 Boston University at No. 2 Lehigh	60–74	CBSSN	4,323
Game times in ET. Rankings denote tournament seeding. All games hosted by higher-seeded team.

== Bracket ==
First round Tuesday, March 3 ESPN+
8	Bucknell	65
9	Army	55
7	Lafayette	77
10	Holy Cross	82

Quarterfinals; Thursday March 5 ESPN+
1	Navy	74
8	Bucknell	69
4	Boston University	75
5	American	73
2	Lehigh	69
10	Holy Cross	66
3	Colgate	90
6	Loyola	77

Semifinals; Sunday, March 8 CBSSN
1	Navy	72
4	Boston University	73
2	Lehigh	76
3	Colgate	69

Championship; Wednesday, March 11; CBSSN
4	Boston University	60
2	Lehigh	74

== Awards and honors ==
=== All-Tournament Team ===
Player	Team
**Nasir Whitlock**	Lehigh
Hank Alvey	Lehigh
Joshua Ingram	Lehigh
Chance Gladden	Boston University
Ben Defty	Boston University
Aidan Kehoe	Navy

MVP in bold
