= 2025–26 American Eagles men's basketball team =

American college basketball season

2025–26 American Eagles men's basketball
- Conference: Patriot League
- Record: 16–16 (9–9 Patriot)
- Head coach: Duane Simpkins (3rd season)
- Associate head coach: Nate Bollinger
- Assistant coaches: Jackie Manuel; Isaiah Tate
- Home arena: Bender Arena

2025–26 Patriot League men's basketball standings
	Conf.				Overall
Team	W		L	PCT	W		L	PCT
Navy	17	–	1	.944	26	–	8	.765
Lehigh †	11	–	7	.611	18	–	17	.514
Colgate	11	–	7	.611	18	–	15	.545
Boston University	10	–	8	.556	17	–	17	.500
American	9	–	9	.500	16	–	16	.500
Loyola	8	–	10	.444	12	–	20	.375
Lafayette	8	–	10	.444	11	–	21	.344
Bucknell	6	–	12	.333	10	–	23	.303
Army	5	–	13	.278	11	–	21	.344
Holy Cross	5	–	13	.278	11	–	22	.333
† 2026 Patriot League tournament winner

The 2025–26 American Eagles men's basketball team represented American University during the 2025–26 NCAA Division I men's basketball season. The Eagles, led by third-year head coach Duane Simpkins, played their home games at Bender Arena in Washington, D.C. as members of the Patriot League.

== Previous season ==
The Eagles finished the 2024–25 season 22–13, 13–5 in Patriot League play, to finish as Patriot League regular season co-champions, alongside Bucknell. They defeated Lafayette, Colgate, and Navy to win the Patriot League tournament championship, earning the Eagles their first NCAA tournament appearance since 2014. In the NCAA tournament, the Eagles would receive the #16 seed in the East Region, where they would be defeated by fellow #16 seed Mount St. Mary's in the First Four.

== Preseason ==
On October 15, 2025, the Patriot League released their preseason poll. American was picked to finish fourth in the conference.

=== Preseason rankings ===
Patriot League Preseason Poll
Place	Team	Points
1	Navy	79 (7)
2	Boston University	73 (2)
3	Colgate	64 (1)
4	American	47
5	Bucknell	44
6	Loyola (MD)	39
7	Lafayette	36
8	Lehigh	30
9	Holy Cross	23
10	Army	15
(#) first-place votes

=== Preseason Defensive Player of the Year ===
Preseason Defensive Player of the Year
Player	Year	Position
Greg Jones	Junior	Guard

=== Preseason All-Patriot League Team ===
Preseason All-Patriot League Team
Player	Year	Position
Greg Jones	Junior	Guard

== Roster ==
2025–26 American Eagles men's basketball team
Players
Coaches

Pos.	#	Name	Height	Weight	Year	Previous school	Hometown
G	1	Kamran Prince	6 ft 3 in (1.91 m)	180 lb (82 kg)	Fr	Trinity Academy	Goldsboro, North Carolina
G	2	Madden Collins	6 ft 5 in (1.96 m)	180 lb (82 kg)	Fr	Christ School	Columbia, South Carolina
G	3	Dean Hogans	6 ft 4 in (1.93 m)	200 lb (91 kg)	Fr	Hotchkiss School	White Plains, New York
G	4	Kade Sebastian	6 ft 4 in (1.93 m)	180 lb (82 kg)	Fr	DeMatha Catholic High School	Fairfax, Virginia
G	7	Wyatt Nausadis	6 ft 4 in (1.93 m)	200 lb (91 kg)	So	St. Francis High School	Traverse City, Michigan
G	8	Jack Anderson	6 ft 4 in (1.93 m)	185 lb (84 kg)	Fr	Menlo-Atherton High School	Menlo Park, California
G	9	Matthew Casey	6 ft 4 in (1.93 m)	180 lb (82 kg)	Fr	Riviera Prep	Miami, Florida
G	10	Adrian Samuels	6 ft 5 in (1.96 m)	180 lb (82 kg)	Sr	Vanderbilt	Nashville, Tennessee
G	12	Geoff Sprouse	6 ft 1 in (1.85 m)	185 lb (84 kg)	Sr	Pembroke Pines High School	Pembroke Pines, Florida
F	13	Carson McDonald	6 ft 9 in (2.06 m)	220 lb (100 kg)	Fr	The Newman School	Denver, Colorado
F	14	Gibraltar Coleman	6 ft 6 in (1.98 m)	225 lb (102 kg)	Jr	Flint Hill School	Lorton, Virginia
F	16	Luke Brown	6 ft 9 in (2.06 m)	200 lb (91 kg)	Fr	Vermont Academy	Greenville, Delaware
F	21	Noah Jones	6 ft 6 in (1.98 m)	200 lb (91 kg)	Sr	Mount Saint Joseph High School	Manchester, Maryland
G	22	Shane O'Reilly	6 ft 3 in (1.91 m)	190 lb (86 kg)	So	Northfield Mount Hermon School	Moraga, California
F	23	Greg Jones	6 ft 6 in (1.98 m)	200 lb (91 kg)	Jr	Hayfield Secondary School	Alexandria, Virginia
F	25	Eric Michaels	6 ft 9 in (2.06 m)	247 lb (112 kg)	So	Blair Academy	Poughkeepsie, New York
F	32	Julen Iturbe	6 ft 7 in (2.01 m)	225 lb (102 kg)	So	Riverside High School	Greenville, South Carolina
F	33	Matt Mayock	6 ft 7 in (2.01 m)	191 lb (87 kg)	Jr	Westtown School	Berwyn, Pennsylvania
F	35	Chris Eagan	6 ft 8 in (2.03 m)	220 lb (100 kg)	Fr	Charlotte Catholic High School	Charlotte, North Carolina

Head coach

- Duane Simpkins (Maryland)

Assistant coach(es)

- Nate Bollinger (Millersville)
- Jackie Manuel (North Carolina)
- Isaiah Tate (George Mason)

Legend

- (C) Team captain
- (S) Suspended
- (I) Ineligible
- (W) Walk-on
- Injured
- Current redshirt

Roster
Last update: November 24, 2025

== Schedule and results ==
Date time, TV	Rank^{#}	Opponent^{#}	Result	Record	Site (attendance) city, state
Non-conference regular season
November 3, 2025*; 8:00 pm, ACCNX		at Wake Forest	L 74–88	0–1	LJVM Coliseum (7,023); Winston-Salem, NC
November 9, 2025*; 1:00 pm, ESPN+		Penn	W 84–78	1–1	Bender Arena (1,621); Washington, D.C.
November 12, 2025*; 7:00 pm, ESPN+		at George Washington	L 67–107	1–2	Charles E. Smith Center (1,984); Washington, D.C.
November 15, 2025*; 4:00 pm, ESPN+		Central Penn	W 115–50	2–2	Bender Arena (798); Washington, D.C.
November 18, 2025*; 6:30 pm, BTN		at Rutgers	L 71–80	2–3	Jersey Mike's Arena (8,000); Piscataway, NJ
November 24, 2025*; 7:00 pm, ESPN+		Marywood	W 113–53	3–3	Bender Arena (470); Washington, D.C.
November 28, 2025*; 4:00 pm, ESPN+		Maine; Capital Thanksgiving Classic	W 74–61	4–3	Bender Arena (820); Washington, D.C.
November 29, 2025*; 4:00 pm, ESPN+		Siena; Capital Thanksgiving Classic	L 55–59	4–4	Bender Arena (821); Washington, D.C.
November 30, 2025*; 4:00 pm, ESPN+		Longwood; Capital Thanksgiving Classic	W 92–66	5–4	Bender Arena (828); Washington, D.C.
December 3, 2025*; 7:00 pm, ESPN+		Drexel	W 75–73	6–4	Bender Arena (1,065); Washington, D.C.
December 6, 2025*; 2:00 pm, ESPN+		Maryland Eastern Shore	W 78–60	7–4	Bender Arena (744); Washington, D.C.
December 18, 2025*; 7:00 pm, ESPN+		at VCU	L 83–105	7–5	Siegel Center (7,637); Richmond, VA
December 22, 2025*; 6:00 pm, ACCN		at No. 21 Virginia	L 51–95	7–6	John Paul Jones Arena (12,295); Charlottesville, VA
Patriot League regular season
December 31, 2025; 1:00 pm, ESPN+		Loyola (MD)	W 84–69	8–6 (1–0)	Bender Arena (781); Washington, D.C.
January 3, 2026; 1:00 pm, ESPN+		at Boston University	W 64–62	9–6 (2–0)	Case Gym (1,016); Boston, MA
January 7, 2026; 7:00 pm, ESPN+		at Colgate	L 62-64	9-7 (2-1)	Cotterell Court (552); Hamilton, NY
January 10, 2026; 4:00 pm, ESPN+		Holy Cross	L 73-84	9-8 (2-2)	Bender Arena (2,146); Washington, D.C.
January 12, 2026; 7:00 pm, CBSSN		Navy	W 65-51	11-8 (3-2)	Bender Arena (13-4); Washington, D.C.
January 18, 2026; 1:00 pm, ESPN+		at Army	W 78–67	11–8 (4–2)	Christl Arena; West Point, NY
January 21, 2026; 7:00 pm, ESPN+		Colgate	W 70-66	12-8 (5-2)	Bender Arena (912); Washington, D.C.
January 24, 2026; 2:00 pm, ESPN+		at Holy Cross	W 76-67	13-8 (6-2)	Hart Center (1,026); Worcester, MA
January 28, 2026; 7:00 pm, ESPN+		at Loyola (MD)	L 68-77	13-9 (6-3)	Reitz Arena (684); Baltimore, MD
January 31, 2026; 2:00 pm, ESPN+		Lafayette	L 65-67	13-10 (6-4)	Bender Arena (1,336); Washington, D.C.
February 4, 2026; 7:00 pm, ESPN+		Bucknell	L 59-60	13-11 (6-5)	Bender Arena (953); Washington, D.C.
February 7, 2026; 4:00 pm, ESPN+		at Navy	L 73-82	13-12 (6-6)	Alumni Hall (2,241); Annapolis, MD
February 11, 2026; 7:00 pm, ESPN+		at Lehigh	L 82-90	13-13 (6-7)	Stabler Arena (571); Bethlehem, PA
February 14, 2026; 2:00 pm, ESPN+		Army	W 75–63	14–13 (7–7)	Bender Arena (1,063); Washington, D.C.
February 18, 2026; 7:00 pm, ESPN+		at Bucknell	W 75–57	15–13 (8–7)	Sojka Pavilion (648); Lewisburg, PA
February 22, 2026; 12:00 pm, ESPN+		at Lafayette	W 75–61	16–13 (9–7)	Kirby Sports Center (1,144); Easton, PA
February 25, 2026; 7:00 pm, ESPN+		Lehigh	L 73–78	16–14 (9–8)	Bender Arena (1,141); Washington, D.C.
February 28, 2026; 2:00 pm, ESPN+		Boston University	L 65–68	16–15 (9–9)	Bender Arena (1,509); Washington, D.C.
Patriot League tournament
March 5, 2026; 7:00 p.m., ESPN+	(5)	at (4) Boston University; Quarterfinals	L 73–75	16–16	Case Gym; Boston, MA
*Non-conference game. ^{#}Rankings from AP Poll. (#) Tournament seedings in parentheses. All times are in Eastern.
