= 2025–26 Lafayette Leopards men's basketball team =

American college basketball season

2025–26 Lafayette Leopards men's basketball
- Conference: Patriot League
- Record: 11–21 (8–10 Patriot)
- Head coach: Mike McGarvey (3rd season)
- Assistant coaches: Nikolai Arnold; Cameron Ayers; Sean O'Brien
- Home arena: Kirby Sports Center

2025–26 Patriot League men's basketball standings
	Conf.				Overall
Team	W		L	PCT	W		L	PCT
Navy	17	–	1	.944	26	–	8	.765
Lehigh †	11	–	7	.611	18	–	17	.514
Colgate	11	–	7	.611	18	–	15	.545
Boston University	10	–	8	.556	17	–	17	.500
American	9	–	9	.500	16	–	16	.500
Loyola	8	–	10	.444	12	–	20	.375
Lafayette	8	–	10	.444	11	–	21	.344
Bucknell	6	–	12	.333	10	–	23	.303
Army	5	–	13	.278	11	–	21	.344
Holy Cross	5	–	13	.278	11	–	22	.333
† 2026 Patriot League tournament winner

The 2025–26 Lafayette Leopards men's basketball team represented Lafayette College during the 2025–26 NCAA Division I men's basketball season. The Leopards, led by third-year head coach Mike McGarvey, played their home games at the Kirby Sports Center in Easton, Pennsylvania, as members of the Patriot League.

== Previous season ==
The Leopards finished the 2024–25 season 13–20, 7–11 in Patriot League play, to finish in seventh place. They defeated Holy Cross, before falling to eventual tournament champions American in the quarterfinals of the Patriot League tournament.

== Preseason ==
On October 15, 2025, the Patriot League released their preseason poll. Lafayette was picked to finish seventh in the conference.

=== Preseason rankings ===
Patriot League Preseason Poll
Place	Team	Points
1	Navy	79 (7)
2	Boston University	73 (2)
3	Colgate	64 (1)
4	American	47
5	Bucknell	44
6	Loyola (MD)	39
7	Lafayette	36
8	Lehigh	30
9	Holy Cross	23
10	Army	15
(#) first-place votes

=== Preseason All-Patriot League Team ===
No players were named to the Preseason All-Patriot League Team.

== Roster ==
2025–26 Lafayette Leopards men's basketball team
Players
Coaches

Pos.	#	Name	Height	Weight	Year	Previous school	Hometown
G	0	Ryan Pettit	6 ft 2 in (1.88 m)	185 lb (84 kg)	Sr	Rutgers Prep	Westfield, New Jersey
G	1	Caleb Williams	6 ft 0 in (1.83 m)	165 lb (75 kg)	So	Jean Ribault High School	Jacksonville, Florida
G/F	2	KaiMani Murdock	6 ft 6 in (1.98 m)	195 lb (88 kg)	So	Denmark Technical College	Mount Pleasant, South Carolina
G	3	Beckett Currie	5 ft 11 in (1.8 m)	160 lb (73 kg)	Fr	Camas High School	Camas, Washington
G	10	Mark Butler	5 ft 10 in (1.78 m)	170 lb (77 kg)	Jr	William Penn Charter School	Philadelphia, Pennsylvania
G/F	11	Luke Azzinaro	6 ft 5 in (1.96 m)	185 lb (84 kg)	Fr	Delbarton School	Chatham, New Jersey
C	13	Misha Bednostin	6 ft 11 in (2.11 m)	245 lb (111 kg)	Jr	Trinity High School	Kyiv, Ukraine
F	14	Malik Rasul	6 ft 7 in (2.01 m)	200 lb (91 kg)	So	Westtown School	Tucson, Arizona
G	20	Ashton Wallace	6 ft 3 in (1.91 m)	190 lb (86 kg)	Fr	American Fork High School	Cedar Hills, Utah
G/F	21	Andrew Phillips	6 ft 4 in (1.93 m)	210 lb (95 kg)	Jr	Malvern Prep	Chester Springs, Pennsylvania
F	22	Christian Humphrey-Rembert	6 ft 9 in (2.06 m)	205 lb (93 kg)	Fr	East Kentwood High School	Grand Rapids, Michigan
G/F	23	Joshua Wyche	6 ft 7 in (2.01 m)	215 lb (98 kg)	Jr	Cristo Rey Philadelphia High School	Philadelphia, Pennsylvania
G	24	Folabomi Fayemi	6 ft 4 in (1.93 m)	205 lb (93 kg)	So	South Kent School	Houston, Texas
F	34	Luke Bevilacqua	6 ft 11 in (2.11 m)	235 lb (107 kg)	Fr	George School	Newfield, New Jersey
F	44	Shareef Jackson	6 ft 8 in (2.03 m)	255 lb (116 kg)	Fr	Roman Catholic High School	Philadelphia, Pennsylvania

Head coach

- Mike McGarvey (Ursinus)

Assistant coach(es)

- Nikolai Arnold (Syracuse)
- Cameron Ayers (Bucknell)
- Sean O'Brien (Colgate)

Legend

- (C) Team captain
- (S) Suspended
- (I) Ineligible
- (W) Walk-on
- Injured
- Current redshirt

Roster
Last update: November 27, 2025

== Schedule and results ==
Date time, TV	Rank^{#}	Opponent^{#}	Result	Record	Site (attendance) city, state
Non-conference regular season
November 3, 2025*; 7:00 pm, ESPN+		at Saint Joseph's	L 76–85	0–1	Hagan Arena (2,516); Philadelphia, PA
November 5, 2025*; 7:00 pm, ESPN+		Dickinson	W 79–44	1–1	Kirby Sports Center (1,078); Easton, PA
November 8, 2025*; 3:00 pm, SECN+		at Texas	L 60–97	1–2	Moody Center (10,712); Austin, TX
November 13, 2025*; 6:00 pm, ESPN+		Cornell	L 78–97	1–3	Kirby Sports Center (1,279); Easton, PA
November 17, 2025*; 7:00 pm, ESPN+		at West Virginia	L 59–81	1–4	Hope Coliseum (9,360); Morgantown, WV
November 21, 2025*; 6:00 pm, NECFR		at Stonehill	L 70–74	1–5	Merkert Gymnasium (450); Easton, MA
November 28, 2025*; 4:30 pm, ESPN+		Le Moyne; Lafayette Classic	L 63–76	1–6	Kirby Sports Center (1,067); Easton, PA
November 29, 2025*; 4:30 pm, ESPN+		Ball State; Lafayette Classic	W 55–37	2–6	Kirby Sports Center (1,079); Easton, PA
November 30, 2025*; 2:30 pm, ESPN+		Monmouth; Lafayette Classic	L 74–88	2–7	Kirby Sports Center (477); Easton, PA
December 5, 2025*; 7:00 pm, ESPN+		Mercyhurst	W 79–71	3–7	Kirby Sports Center (1,144); Easton, PA
December 8, 2025*; 6:00 pm, ESPN+		at Penn	L 72–74	3–8	Palestra (934); Philadelphia, PA
December 18, 2025*; 7:00 pm, ESPN+		at Charlotte	L 67–81	3–9	Dale F. Halton Arena (1,932); Charlotte, NC
December 20, 2025*; 2:00 pm, ACCN		at Georgia Tech	L 81–95	3–10	McCamish Pavilion (4,987); Atlanta, GA
Patriot League regular season
December 31, 2025; 3:00 pm, ESPN+		Colgate	L 77–85	3–11 (0–1)	Kirby Sports Center (1,278); Easton, PA
January 3, 2026; 5:00 pm, ESPN+		at Loyola (MD)	W 79–64	4–11 (1–1)	Reitz Arena (524); Baltimore, MD
January 7, 2026; 7:00 pm, ESPN+		Boston University	L 67–83	4–12 (1–2)	Kirby Sports Center (1,028); Easton, PA
January 10, 2026; 2:00 pm, ESPN+		at Navy	L 50–76	4–13 (1–3)	Alumni Hall (1,953); Annapolis, MD
January 14, 2026; 7:30 pm, ESPN+		at Bucknell	L 69–76	4–14 (1–4)	Sojka Pavilion (1,071); Lewisburg, PA
January 17, 2026; 1:00 pm, ESPN+		Holy Cross	W 74–55	5–14 (2–4)	Kirby Sports Center (679); Easton, PA
January 21, 2026; 6:00 pm, ESPN+		at Boston University	L 73–77 ^{OT}	5–15 (2–5)	Case Gym (1,057); Boston, MA
January 24, 2026; 7:00 pm, ESPN+		at Lehigh	L 59–64	5–16 (2–6)	Stabler Arena (1,932); Bethlehem, PA
January 28, 2026; 7:00 pm, CBSSN		Bucknell	W 81–79	6–16 (3–6)	Kirby Sports Center (1,168); Easton, PA
January 31, 2026; 2:00 pm, ESPN+		at American	W 67–65	7–16 (4–6)	Bender Arena (1,336); Washington, D.C.
February 4, 2026; 7:00 pm, ESPN+		Navy	L 50–65	7–17 (4–7)	Kirby Sports Center (1,306); Easton, PA
February 7, 2026; 12:00 pm, ESPN+		at Army	W 63−60	8−17 (5−7)	Christl Arena (758); West Point, NY
February 11, 2026; 7:00 pm, ESPN+		Loyola (MD)	L 54−68	8−18 (5−8)	Kirby Sports Center (1,446); Easton, PA
February 14, 2026; 5:00 pm, ESPN+		Lehigh	L 69−78	8−19 (5−9)	Kirby Sports Center (1,774); Easton, PA
February 18, 2026; 6:00 pm, ESPN+		at Holy Cross	W 86−83	9−19 (6−9)	Hart Center (1,086); Worcester, MA
February 22, 2026; 12:00 pm, ESPN+		American	L 61–75	9−20 (6−10)	Kirby Sports Center (1,144); Easton, PA
February 25, 2026; 7:00 pm, ESPN+		at Colgate	W 70–69	10−20 (7−10)	Cotterell Court (608); Hamilton, NY
February 28, 2026; 1:00 pm, ESPN+		Army	W 83–77	11−20 (8−10)	Kirby Sports Center (1,764); Easton, PA
Patriot League tournament
March 3, 2026; 7:00 pm, ESPN+	(7)	(10) Holy Cross; First round	L 77–82	11–21	Kirby Sports Center (1,434); Easton, PA
*Non-conference game. ^{#}Rankings from AP Poll. (#) Tournament seedings in parentheses. All times are in Eastern.
