= 2024–25 Patriot League men's basketball season =

College basketball season

- League: NCAA Division I
- Sport: Men's basketball
- Teams: 10

Regular season
- Season champions: American, Bucknell
- Season MVP: Noah Williamson, Bucknell

Tournament
- Champions: American

Basketball seasons
- ← 2023–24 2025–26 →

2024–25 Patriot League men's basketball standings
	Conf.				Overall
Team	W		L	PCT	W		L	PCT
Bucknell	13	–	5	.722	18	–	15	.545
American †	13	–	5	.722	22	–	13	.629
Colgate	10	–	8	.556	14	–	19	.424
Boston University	10	–	8	.556	16	–	16	.500
Navy	10	–	8	.556	15	–	19	.441
Army	10	–	8	.556	17	–	16	.515
Lafayette	7	–	11	.389	13	–	20	.394
Loyola	6	–	12	.333	12	–	19	.387
Lehigh	6	–	12	.333	11	–	19	.367
Holy Cross	5	–	13	.278	13	–	19	.406
† 2025 Patriot League tournament winner

The 2024–25 Patriot League men's basketball season began with practices in September 2024 and ended with the 2025 Patriot League men's basketball tournament in March 2025.

== Head coaches ==
=== Coaching changes ===
- On March 30, 2024, Loyola named Josh Loeffler as their new head coach.

=== Coaches ===
Team	Head coach	Previous job	Season	Overall record	Patriot record	NCAA Tournaments
American	Duane Simpkins	George Mason (asst.)	2nd	35–28 (.556)	23–13 (.639)	1
Army	Kevin Kuwik	Butler (asst.)	2nd	26–36 (.419)	16–20 (.444)	0
Boston University	Joe Jones	Boston College (asst.)	14th	234–206 (.532)	144–102 (.585)	0
Bucknell	John Griffin III	St. Joseph's (asst.)	2nd	31–33 (.484)	23–13 (.639)	0
Colgate	Matt Langel	Temple (asst.)	14th	240–202 (.543)	151–87 (.634)	5
Holy Cross	Dave Paulson	Fordham (asst.)	2nd	23–41 (.359)	11–25 (.306)	0
Lafayette	Mike McGarvey	Lafayette (asst.)	3rd	25–43 (.368)	17–19 (.472)	0
Lehigh	Brett Reed	Lehigh (asst.)	18th	287–258 (.527)	160–134 (.544)	2
Loyola	Josh Loeffler	Cincinnati (asst.)	1st	11–18 (.379)	6–12 (.333)	0
Navy	Ed DeChellis	Penn State	14th	194–229 (.459)	113–126 (.473)	0

Notes:

- Season number includes 2024–25 season.
- Records are inclusive through the 2024–25 season.
- NCAA Tournament appearances are through the 2024-25 season.

== Preseason ==
=== Preseason coaches poll ===
2024–25 Patriot League Preseason Coaches Poll
Rank	Team (First place votes)	Points
1	Colgate (14)	156
2	American (4)	144
3	Boston University (2)	120
4	Bucknell	115
5	Lehigh	103
6	Lafayette	77
7	Army	64
8	Navy	61
9	Holy Cross	40
10	Loyola	20

=== Preseason All-Patriot League ===
First team
Matt Rogers, American
Miles Brewster, Boston University
Noah Williamson, Bucknell
Taylor Whitney-Sidney, Lehigh
Austin Benigni, Navy
Preseason Player of the Year: Matt Rogers, American

== Regular season ==
=== Player of the Week awards ===
Week	Player of the Week	Rookie of the Week
1	Austin Benigni, Navy	Braeden Speed, Loyola
2	Max Green, Holy Cross	Max Green, Holy Cross
3	Elijah Stephens, American	Azmar Abdullah, Boston University
4	Milos Ilic, Loyola	Alex Chaikin, Lafayette
5	Jalen Rucker, Army	Max Green (2), Holy Cross
6	Jordan Stiemke, Loyola	Braeden Speed (2), Loyola
7	Joe Nugent, Holy Cross	Max Green (3), Holy Cross
8	Jalen Rucker (2), Army	Max Green (4), Holy Cross
9	Donovan Draper, Navy	Max Green (5), Holy Cross
10	Jalen Rucker (3), Army	Caleb Williams, Lafayette
11	Jalen Rucker (4), Army	Max Green (6), Holy Cross
12	Matt Rogers, American	Max Green (7), Holy Cross
13	Noah Williamson, Bucknell	Braeden Speed (3), Loyola
14	Noah Williamson (2), Bucknell	Max Green (8), Holy Cross
15	Matt Rogers (2), American	Alex Chaikin (2), Lafayette
16	Josh Bascoe, Bucknell	Max Green (9), Holy Cross
17	Jordan Pennick, Navy	Alex Chaikin (3), Lafayette

School	POTW	ROTW
American	3	0
Army	4	0
Boston University	0	1
Bucknell	3	0
Colgate	0	0
Holy Cross	2	9
Lafayette	0	4
Lehigh	0	0
Loyola	2	3
Navy	3	0

== Postseason ==
=== Patriot League tournament ===
The conference tournament will be played from March 4 to March 12, 2025. All tournament games are hosted at the higher seed's campus site.

=== NCAA Tournament ===
As the conference champion, American received an automatic bid to the 2025 NCAA Division I men's basketball tournament.

Seed	Region	School	First Four	First round	Second round	Sweet Sixteen	Elite Eight	Final Four	Championship
16	East	American	L 72–83 vs (16) Mount Saint Mary's	―	―	―	―	―	―

=== College Basketball Invitational ===
Army accepted a bid to the 2025 College Basketball Invitational.

School	First round	Quarterfinals	Semifinals	Finals
Army	W 83–78 vs Elon	L 65–68 vs Florida Gulf Coast	―	―

== Conference awards ==
2025 Patriot League Men's Basketball Individual Awards
Award	Recipient(s)
Player of the Year	Noah Williamson, Bucknell
Coach of the Year	John Griffin III, Bucknell
Defensive Player of the Year	Justin Vander Baan, Lafayette
Rookie of the Year	Max Green, Holy Cross

2025 Patriot League Men's Basketball All-Conference Teams
First Team	Second Team	Third Team	Defensive Team	Rookie Team
Matt Rogers, Amer; Jalen Rucker, Army; Noah Williamson, Buck; John Bascoe, Buck; Austin Benigni, Navy	Josh Scovens, Army; Kyrone Alexander, BU; Jeff Woodward, Col; Tyler Whitney-Sidney, Leh; Milos Ilic, Loy	Elijah Stephens, Amer; Miles Brewster, BU; Jalen Cox, Col; Max Green, HC; Alex Chaikan, LAF; Justin Vander Baan, Laf	Greg Jones, Amer; Noah Williamson, Buck; Jalen Cox, Col; Caleb Kenney, HC; Justin Vander Baan, Laf	Azmar Abdullah, BU; Max Green, HC; Alex Chaikin, Laf; Caleb Williams, Laf; Hank Alvey, Leh
