= 2024–25 Boston University Terriers men's basketball team =

American college basketball season

2024–25 Boston University Terriers men's basketball
- Conference: Patriot League
- Record: 16–16 (10–8 Patriot)
- Head coach: Joe Jones (14th season)
- Associate head coach: Mike Quinn
- Assistant coaches: Curtis Wilson; Al Paul
- Home arena: Case Gym

2024–25 Patriot League men's basketball standings
	Conf.				Overall
Team	W		L	PCT	W		L	PCT
Bucknell	13	–	5	.722	18	–	15	.545
American †	13	–	5	.722	22	–	13	.629
Colgate	10	–	8	.556	14	–	19	.424
Boston University	10	–	8	.556	16	–	16	.500
Navy	10	–	8	.556	15	–	19	.441
Army	10	–	8	.556	17	–	16	.515
Lafayette	7	–	11	.389	13	–	20	.394
Loyola	6	–	12	.333	12	–	19	.387
Lehigh	6	–	12	.333	11	–	19	.367
Holy Cross	5	–	13	.278	13	–	19	.406
† 2025 Patriot League tournament winner

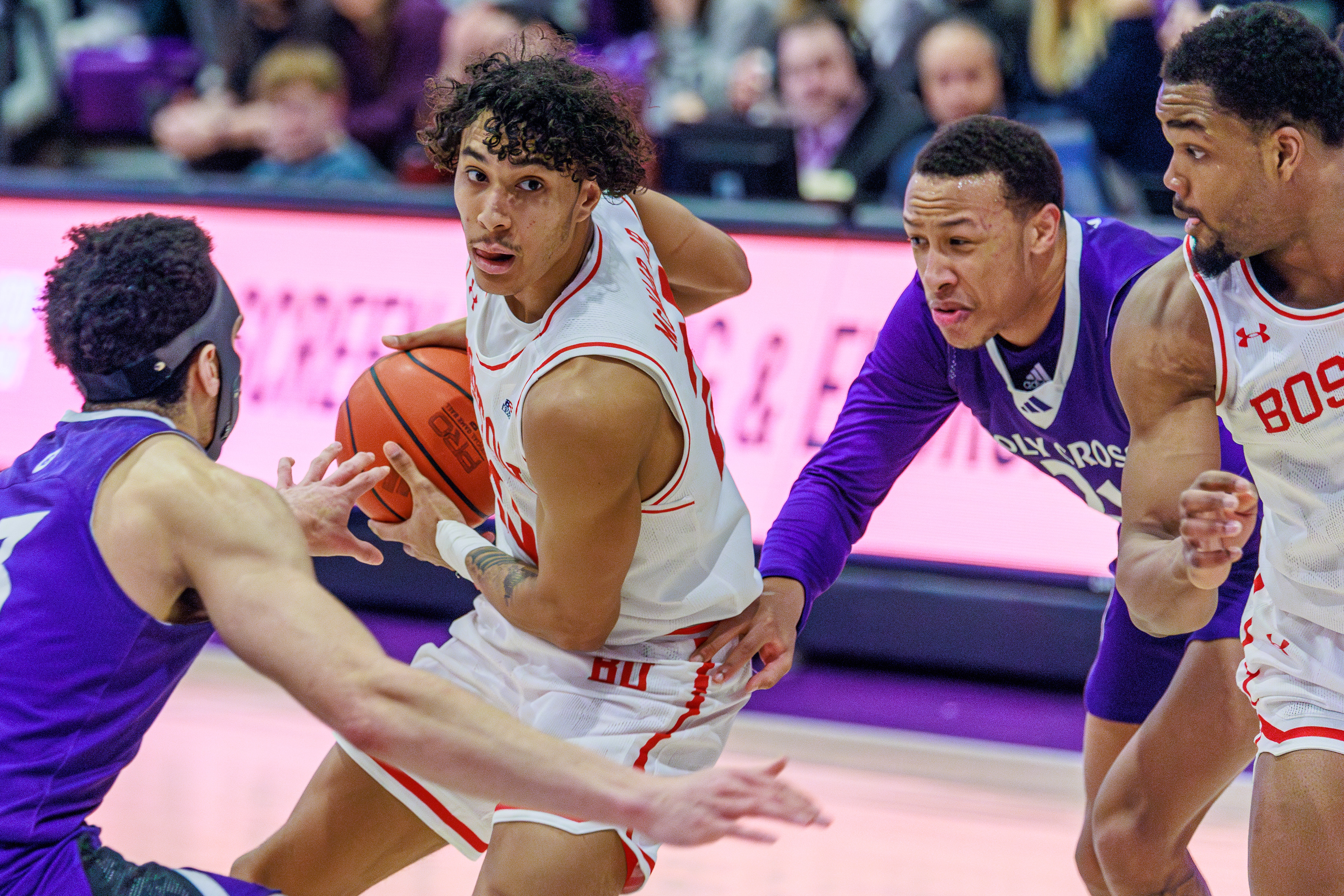
Michael McNair scored 13 points against Holy Cross on February 8

The 2024–25 Boston University Terriers men's basketball team represented Boston University during the 2024–25 NCAA Division I men's basketball season. The Terriers, led by 14th-year head coach Joe Jones, played their home games at Case Gym in Boston, Massachusetts as members of the Patriot League.

== Previous season ==
The Terriers finished the 2023–24 season 16–17, 10–8 in Patriot League play to finish in a tie for second place. As the No. 2 seed in the Patriot League tournament, they defeated No. 7 Navy in the quarterfinals, before falling to No. 6 Lehigh in the semifinals.

== Roster ==
2024–25 Boston University Terriers men's basketball team
Players
Coaches

Pos.	#	Name	Height	Weight	Year	Hometown
G/F	0	Matai Baptiste	6 ft 7 in (2.01 m)	215 lb (98 kg)	So	Toronto, Ontario
G	1	Ethan Okwuosa	6 ft 3 in (1.91 m)	195 lb (88 kg)	Sr	North Haven, Connecticut
G	2	Ben Palacios	6 ft 5 in (1.96 m)	200 lb (91 kg)	Sr	Kansas City, Missouri
F	3	Malcolm Chimezie	6 ft 8 in (2.03 m)	220 lb (100 kg)	Sr	Yonkers, New York
G	5	Kyrone Alexander	6 ft 5 in (1.96 m)	200 lb (91 kg)	So	Bridgetown, Barbados
G	7	Azmar Abdullah	6 ft 3 in (1.91 m)	180 lb (82 kg)	Fr	Cranston, Rhode Island
G	13	Ryan Sutliff	6 ft 4 in (1.93 m)	185 lb (84 kg)	Sr	Boston, Massachusetts
F	14	Ben Defty	7 ft 0 in (2.13 m)	255 lb (116 kg)	Fr	Berlin, Germany
G	20	Michael McNair	6 ft 5 in (1.96 m)	185 lb (84 kg)	So	Temecula, California
F	21	Nico Nobili	6 ft 10 in (2.08 m)	220 lb (100 kg)	Jr	Bologna, Italy
G	24	Miles Brewster	6 ft 3 in (1.91 m)	175 lb (79 kg)	GS	Brooklyn, New York
G	25	Spencer Joyner	6 ft 4 in (1.93 m)	195 lb (88 kg)	So	Hackensack, New Jersey
G	30	Ben Roy	6 ft 0 in (1.83 m)	170 lb (77 kg)	Jr	Spring Lake Heights, New Jersey
F	32	Quinn Nielson	6 ft 11 in (2.11 m)	250 lb (113 kg)	So	Hingham, Massachusetts
F	41	Otto Landrum	6 ft 9 in (2.06 m)	215 lb (98 kg)	Jr	San Diego, California

Head coach

- Joe Jones (SUNY–Oswego)

Assistant coach(es)

- Mike Quinn (Bentley)
- Curtis Wilson (Adelphi)
- Al Paul (SUNY Delhi)

Legend

- (C) Team captain
- (S) Suspended
- (I) Ineligible
- (W) Walk-on
- Injured
- Current redshirt

Roster
Last update: November 18, 2024

== Schedule and results ==
Date time, TV	Rank^{#}	Opponent^{#}	Result	Record	Site (attendance) city, state
Non-conference regular season
November 4, 2024*; 7:30 pm, ESPN+		Northeastern	L 72–80	0–1	Case Gym; Boston, MA
November 8, 2024*; 10:00 pm, ESPN+		at San Diego	L 60–74	0–2	Jenny Craig Pavilion (731); San Diego, CA
November 11, 2024*; 10:00 pm, BTN		at UCLA	L 40–71	0–3	Pauley Pavilion (5,108); Los Angeles, CA
November 16, 2024*; 7:00 pm, ESPN+		Dartmouth	W 78–50	1–3	Case Gym (877); Boston, MA
November 19, 2024*; 7:00 pm, ESPN+		Wagner	L 58–60	1–4	Case Gym (622); Boston, MA
November 23, 2024*; 12:00 pm, ESPN+		at UMBC; UMBC MTE	W 75–71	2–4	Chesapeake Employers Insurance Arena (1,273); Catonsville, MD
November 24, 2024*; 12:00 pm		vs. Howard; UMBC MTE	W 69–62	3–4	Chesapeake Employers Insurance Arena (57); Catonsville, MD
December 1, 2024*; 4:00 pm, ESPN+		Sacred Heart	L 65–73	3–5	Case Gym (981); Boston, MA
December 7, 2024*; 1:00 pm, ESPN+		Albany	W 80–74 ^{OT}	4–5	Case Gym (720); Boston, MA
December 9, 2024*; 6:00 pm, ESPN+		Thomas	W 113–75	5–5	Case Gym; Boston, MA
December 13, 2024*; 7:00 pm, ESPN+		at Merrimack	L 61–64	5–6	Lawler Arena (1,327); North Andover, MA
December 21, 2024*; 2:00 pm, ESPN+		at UMass Lowell	L 71–83	5–7	Costello Athletic Center (532); Lowell, MA
December 29, 2024*; 2:00 pm, ESPN+		at Maine	W 59–56	6–7	Memorial Gymnasium (1,221); Orono, ME
Patriot League regular season
January 2, 2025; 7:00 pm, ESPN+		at Lafayette	L 46–60	6–8 (0–1)	Kirby Sports Center (1,289); Easton, PA
January 5, 2025; 1:00 pm, ESPN+		Army	W 71–63	7–8 (1–1)	Case Gym (1,073); Boston, MA
January 8, 2025; 7:00 pm, ESPN+		American	W 60–54	8–8 (2–1)	Case Gym (357); Boston, MA
January 11, 2025; 2:00 pm, ESPN+		at Colgate	L 50–87	8–9 (2–2)	Cotterell Court (757); Hamilton, NY
January 15, 2025; 6:00 pm, ESPN+		Lehigh	W 63–58	9–9 (3–2)	Case Gym (670); Boston, MA
January 18, 2025; 12:00 pm, ESPN+		at Army	L 62–68	9–10 (3–3)	Christl Arena (1,168); West Point, NY
January 22, 2025; 7:00 pm, ESPN+		at Navy	L 47–62	9–11 (3–4)	Alumni Hall (904); Annapolis, MD
January 25, 2025; 1:00 pm, ESPN+		Bucknell	W 85–82 ^{OT}	10–11 (4–4)	Case Gym (905); Boston, MA
January 27, 2025; 7:00 pm, CBSSN		Holy Cross; Turnpike Trophy	W 69–59	11–11 (5–4)	Case Gym (1,632); Boston, MA
February 1, 2025; 2:00 pm, ESPN+		at Loyola (MD)	L 67–69	11–12 (5–5)	Reitz Arena (816); Baltimore, MD
February 5, 2025; 7:00 pm, ESPN+		Navy	W 87–65	12–12 (6–5)	Case Gym (503); Boston, MA
February 8, 2025; 12:00 pm, ESPN+		at Holy Cross; Turnpike Trophy	L 52–72	12–13 (6–6)	Hart Center; Worcester, MA
February 12, 2025; 7:00 pm, ESPN+		at Bucknell	L 60–76	12–14 (6–7)	Sojka Pavilion (894); Lewisburg, PA
February 15, 2025; 1:00 pm, ESPN+		Colgate	W 93–91 ^{2OT}	13–14 (7–7)	Case Gym (993); Boston, MA
February 19, 2025; 7:00 pm, ESPN+		Loyola (MD)	W 68–66	14–14 (8–7)	Case Gym (893); Boston, MA
February 22, 2025; 4:00 pm, ESPN+		at American	L 44–48	14–15 (8–8)	Bender Arena (1,628); Washington, D.C.
February 26, 2025; 6:00 pm, ESPN+		at Lehigh	W 79–68	15–15 (9–8)	Stabler Arena (709); Bethlehem, PA
March 1, 2025; 12:00 pm, ESPN+		Lafayette	W 66–64	16–15 (10–8)	Case Gym (1,357); Boston, MA
Patriot League tournament
March 6, 2025; 7:00 pm, ESPN+	(4)	(5) Navy; Quarterfinals	L 78–86	16–16	Case Gym (530); Boston, MA
*Non-conference game. ^{#}Rankings from AP Poll. (#) Tournament seedings in parentheses. All times are in Eastern.
