= 2024–25 Saint Joseph's Hawks men's basketball team =

American college basketball season

2024–25 Saint Joseph's Hawks men's basketball
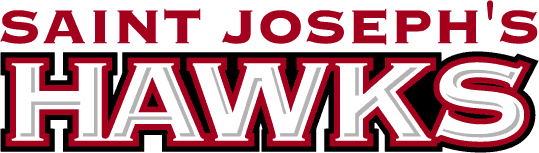

Big 5 Classic champions

NIT, First Round
- Conference: Atlantic 10 Conference
- Record: 22–13 (11–7 A–10)
- Head coach: Billy Lange (6th season)
- Associate head coach: Justin Scott
- Assistant coaches: Thomas Boyle; Dwayne Jones
- Home arena: Hagan Arena

2024–25 Atlantic 10 men's basketball standings
	Conf.				Overall
Team	W		L	PCT	W		L	PCT
VCU †	15	–	3	.833	28	–	7	.800
George Mason	15	–	3	.833	27	–	9	.750
Dayton	12	–	6	.667	23	–	11	.676
Loyola Chicago	12	–	6	.667	25	–	12	.676
Saint Louis	11	–	7	.611	19	–	15	.559
Saint Joseph's	11	–	7	.611	22	–	13	.629
George Washington	9	–	9	.500	21	–	13	.618
St. Bonaventure	9	–	9	.500	22	–	12	.647
Duquesne	8	–	10	.444	13	–	19	.406
Rhode Island	7	–	11	.389	18	–	13	.581
UMass	7	–	11	.389	12	–	20	.375
Davidson	6	–	12	.333	17	–	16	.515
Richmond	5	–	13	.278	10	–	22	.313
La Salle	5	–	13	.278	14	–	19	.424
Fordham	3	–	15	.167	12	–	21	.364
† 2025 A-10 tournament winner

The 2024–25 Saint Joseph's Hawks basketball team represented Saint Joseph's University during the 2024–25 NCAA Division I men's basketball season. The Hawks, led by sixth-year head coach Billy Lange, played their home games at Hagan Arena in Philadelphia, Pennsylvania as members of the Atlantic 10 Conference.

== Previous season ==
The Hawks finished the 2023–24 season 21–14, 9–9 in A-10 play to finish in a three-way tie for seventh place. As the No. 9 seed in the A-10 Tournament they defeated George Mason and upset No. 1-seeded Richmond before losing in the semifinals to VCU. The Hawks received a bid to the National Invitation Tournament where they lost to Seton Hall in the first round.

== Offseason ==
=== Departures ===
Name	Number	Pos.	Height	Weight	Year	Hometown	Reason for departure
Kacper Klaczek	0	G	6'8"	225	Junior	Chorzów, Poland	Transferred to Albany
Christian Winborne	1	G	6'2"	185	Sophomore	Baltimore, MD	Transferred to Iona
Cameron Brown	3	G	6'5"	225	GS Senior	Laurel, MD	Graduated
Lynn Greer III	5	G	6'2"	180	Junior	Philadelphia, PA	Transferred to Temple
Cooper Vogel	15	G	6'3"	180	Senior	Howell, NJ	Walk-on; graduated
Chris Arizin	20	G	6'3"	200	Senior	Media, PA	Walk-on; graduated
Chris Essandoko	22	C	7'0"	285	(redshirt) Freshman	Paris, France	Transferred to Providence
Brian Geatens	25	G	6'0"	180	Senior	Harleysville, PA	Walk-on; graduated
Charles Coleman	32	F/C	7'0"	265	(redshirt) Senior	Boston, MA	Graduated

=== Incoming transfers ===
Name	Num	Pos.	Height	Weight	Year	Hometown	Previous School
Derek Simpson	0	G	6'3"	165	Sophomore	Mount Laurel, NJ	Rutgers
Justice Ajogbor	22	F	6'10"	255	GS Senior	Benin City, Nigeria	Harvard

=== Recruiting classes ===
==== 2024 recruiting class ====
College recruiting information
Name	Hometown	School	Height	Weight	Commit date
Steve Solano #49 C	Bronx, NY	La Lumiere School	6 ft 10 in (2.08 m)	235 lb (107 kg)	Apr 13, 2024
Steve Solano #49 C	Recruit ratings: Rivals: 247Sports: ESPN: (79)				
Kevin Kearney; SF	Brooklyn, NY	South Shore High School	6 ft 8 in (2.03 m)	190 lb (86 kg)	Nov 30, 2023
Kevin Kearney; SF	Recruit ratings: Rivals: 247Sports: ESPN: (NR)				
Mekai Johnson; SG	Upper Marlboro, MD	Bishop Ireton High School	6 ft 5 in (1.96 m)	170 lb (77 kg)	Nov 9, 2023
Mekai Johnson; SG	Recruit ratings: Rivals: 247Sports: ESPN: (NR)				
Khaafiq Myers; PG	Philadelphia, PA	Neumann Goretti High School	5 ft 10 in (1.78 m)	150 lb (68 kg)	Nov 9, 2023
Khaafiq Myers; PG	Recruit ratings: Rivals: 247Sports: ESPN: (NR)				
Overall recruit ranking:
Note: In many cases, Scout, Rivals, 247Sports, On3, and ESPN may conflict in their listings of height and weight.; In these cases, the average was taken. ESPN grades are on a 100-point scale.; Sources: "Saint Joseph's Hawks". ESPN.; "2024 Team Ranking". Rivals.

==== 2025 recruiting class ====
College recruiting information (2025)
Name	Hometown	School	Height	Weight	Commit date
Owen Verna #42 SG	Santa Ana, CA	Mater Dei High School	6 ft 3 in (1.91 m)	185 lb (84 kg)	Jun 26, 2024
Owen Verna #42 SG	Recruit ratings: Rivals: 247Sports: ESPN: (79)				
Overall recruit ranking:
Note: In many cases, Scout, Rivals, 247Sports, On3, and ESPN may conflict in their listings of height and weight.; In these cases, the average was taken. ESPN grades are on a 100-point scale.; Sources: "Saint Joseph's Hawks". ESPN.; "2025 Team Ranking". Rivals.

== Roster ==
2024–25 Saint Joseph's Hawks men's basketball team
Players
Coaches

Pos.	#	Name	Height	Weight	Year	Previous school	Hometown
G	0	Derek Simpson	6 ft 3 in (1.91 m)	165 lb (75 kg)	Jr	Rutgers	Mount Laurel, New Jersey
F	1	Kevin Kearney	6 ft 8 in (2.03 m)	190 lb (86 kg)	Fr	South Shore	Brooklyn, New York
G	2	Erik Reynolds II	6 ft 2 in (1.88 m)	190 lb (86 kg)	Sr	Bullis School	Potomac, Maryland
F	3	Khaafiq Myers	5 ft 10 in (1.78 m)	150 lb (68 kg)	Fr	Neumann Goretti	Philadelphia, Pennsylvania
F	5	Anthony Finkley	6 ft 6 in (1.98 m)	240 lb (109 kg)	So	Roman Catholic	Philadelphia, Pennsylvania
F	7	Dasear Haskins	6 ft 8 in (2.03 m)	200 lb (91 kg)	RS Fr	Camden	Willingboro, New Jersey
G	10	Shawn Simmons II	6 ft 6 in (1.98 m)	205 lb (93 kg)	So	Hillcrest Prep (AZ)	Philadelphia, Pennsylvania
G	11	Xzayvier Brown	6 ft 2 in (1.88 m)	170 lb (77 kg)	So	Roman Catholic	Philadelphia, Pennsylvania
F	13	Rasheer Fleming	6 ft 9 in (2.06 m)	235 lb (107 kg)	Jr	Camden High School	Camden, New Jersey
C	15	Steven Solano	6 ft 11 in (2.11 m)	270 lb (122 kg)	Fr	La Lumiere School	Bronx, New York
F	22	Justice Ajogbor	6 ft 10 in (2.08 m)	255 lb (116 kg)	GS	Harvard	Benin City, Nigeria
G	23	Mekai Johnson	6 ft 5 in (1.96 m)	190 lb (86 kg)	Fr	Bishop Ireton	Silver Spring, Maryland
G/F	24	Will Lange	6 ft 5 in (1.96 m)	215 lb (98 kg)	So	Shipley School	Newtown Square, PA

Head coach

- Billy Lange (Rowan)

Assistant coach(es)

- Justin Scott (East Stroudsburg)
- Thomas Boyle (Saint Joseph's)
- Dwayne Jones (Saint Joseph's)

Legend

- (C) Team captain
- (S) Suspended
- (I) Ineligible
- (W) Walk-on
- Injured
- Current redshirt

Roster

== Schedule and results ==
Date time, TV	Rank^{#}	Opponent^{#}	Result	Record	High points	High rebounds	High assists	Site (attendance) city, state
Exhibition
October 26, 2024*; 1:00 p.m., ESPN+		Bucknell	L 82–88		24 – Reynolds II	8 – Tied	5 – Reynolds II	Hagan Arena; Philadelphia, PA
Non-conference regular season
November 4, 2024*; 7:00 p.m., ESPN+		Navy	W 70–63	1–0	29 – Reynolds II	5 – Reynolds II	3 – Brown	Hagan Arena (2,305); Philadelphia, PA
November 8, 2024*; 7:00 p.m., ESPN+		Central Connecticut	L 67–73	1–1	19 – Fleming	16 – Fleming	5 – Brown	Hagan Arena (2,124); Philadelphia, PA
November 12, 2024*; 5:00 p.m., CBSSN		Villanova; Big 5 Classic Pod 2/Holy War	W 83–76	2–1	19 – Fleming	6 – Tied	13 – Brown	Hagan Arena (3,326); Philadelphia, PA
November 15, 2024*; 8:00 p.m., ESPN+		at Penn; Big 5 Classic Pod 2	W 86–69	3–1	15 – Tied	7 – Brown	4 – Brown	Palestra (3,056); Philadelphia, PA
November 21, 2024*; 9:00 p.m., ESPN2		vs. Texas Tech; Legends Classic semifinal	W 78–77	4–1	26 – Reynolds II	7 – Fleming	6 – Brown	Barclays Center (6,941); Brooklyn, NY
November 22, 2024*; 9:00 p.m., ESPNU		vs. Texas; Legends Classic championship game	L 58–67	4–2	16 – Fleming	20 – Fleming	4 – Tied	Barclays Center (6,572); Brooklyn, NY
November 26, 2024*; 7:00 p.m., ESPN+		Coppin State	W 83–54	5–2	18 – Reynolds II	6 – Tied	5 – Brown	Hagan Arena (1,758); Philadelphia, PA
December 3, 2024*; 7:00 p.m., ESPN+		Princeton	L 69–77	5–3	25 – Fleming	11 – Brown	6 – Simpson	Hagan Arena (2,176); Philadelphia, PA
December 7, 2024*; 7:00 p.m., NBCSPHI		vs. La Salle; Big 5 Classic championship game	W 82–68	6–3	24 – Reynolds II	10 – Fleming	6 – Brown	Wells Fargo Center (14,108); Philadelphia, PA
December 10, 2024*; 7:00 p.m., ESPN+		Charleston	L 75–78	6–4	26 – Fleming	7 – Simpson	6 – Tied	Hagan Arena (2,062); Philadelphia, PA
December 18, 2024*; 7:00 p.m., ESPN+		American	W 84–57	7–4	26 – Fleming	11 – Fleming	6 – Reynolds II	Hagan Arena (1,258); Philadelphia, PA
December 21, 2024*; 12:00 p.m., CBSSN		vs. Virginia Tech; Holiday Hoopfest	W 82–62	8–4	25 – Reynolds II	8 – Fleming	6 – Tied	Palestra (2,346); Philadelphia, PA
December 28, 2024*; 1:00 p.m., ESPN+		Delaware State	W 76–58	9–4	22 – Reynolds II	14 – Fleming	9 – Simpson	Hagan Arena (3,179); Philadelphia, PA
Atlantic 10 regular season
December 31, 2024; 2:00 p.m., ESPN+		UMass	W 81–72	10–4 (1–0)	16 – Fleming	10 – Ajogbor	5 – Brown	Hagan Arena (2,227); Philadelphia, PA
January 3, 2025; 9:00 p.m., ESPN2		at Saint Louis	L 57–73	10–5 (1–1)	13 – Fleming	10 – Fleming	1 – Tied	Chaifetz Arena (6,552); St. Louis, MO
January 8, 2025; 7:00 p.m., ESPN+		at Duquesne	L 81–85	10–6 (1–2)	20 – Fleming	10 – Fleming	10 – Brown	UPMC Cooper Fieldhouse (2,524); Pittsburgh, PA
January 11, 2025; 3:00 p.m., CBSSN		Loyola Chicago	W 93–57	11–6 (2–2)	20 – Brown	9 – Fleming	4 – Tied	Hagan Arena (3,013); Philadelphia, PA
January 17, 2025; 7:00 p.m., ESPNU		VCU	L 69–78	11–7 (2–3)	22 – Brown	14 – Fleming	5 – Brown	Hagan Arena (3,069); Philadelphia, PA
January 21, 2025; 7:00 p.m., ESPN+		at Davidson	W 78–61	12–7 (3–3)	20 – Brown	8 – Tied	6 – Tied	John M. Belk Arena (2,344); Davidson, NC
January 24, 2025; 7:30 p.m., ESPN2		at Dayton	L 72–77	12–8 (3–4)	21 – Reynolds II	7 – Fleming	5 – Brown	UD Arena (13,407); Dayton, OH
January 29, 2025; 7:00 p.m., ESPN+		Duquesne	W 76–72	13–8 (4–4)	20 – Reynolds II	9 – Brown	5 – Brown	Hagan Arena (2,284); Philadelphia, PA
February 1, 2025; 2:00 p.m., CBSSN		at Loyola Chicago	L 55–58	13–9 (4–5)	17 – Reynolds II	13 – Fleming	2 – Simpson	Joseph J. Gentile Arena (4,427); Chicago, IL
February 7, 2025; 9:00 p.m., ESPNU		Saint Louis	W 76–63	14–9 (5–5)	25 – Reynolds II	9 – Brown	5 – Brown	Hagan Arena (2,201); Philadelphia, PA
February 12, 2025; 7:00 p.m., ESPN+		La Salle	W 75–63	15–9 (6–5)	22 – Reynolds II	7 – Reynolds II	4 – Brown	Hagan Arena (2,103); Philadelphia, PA
February 15, 2025; 12:30 p.m., USA		at George Mason	L 57–58	15–10 (6–6)	19 – Brown	7 – Fleming	3 – Reynolds II	EagleBank Arena (5,219); Fairfax, VA
February 19, 2025; 7:00 p.m., ESPN+		at George Washington	W 79–68	16–10 (7–6)	19 – Reynolds II	11 – Fleming	6 – Tied	Charles E. Smith Center (1,810); Washington, D.C.
February 22, 2025; 12:30 p.m., USA		Richmond	W 78–62	17–10 (8–6)	25 – Reynolds II	8 – Finkley	7 – Brown	Hagan Arena (3,402); Philadelphia, PA
February 26, 2025; 7:00 p.m., Peacock		St. Bonaventure	W 75–64	18–10 (9–6)	22 – Brown	10 – Brown	6 – Reynolds II	Hagan Arena (2,543); Philadelphia, PA
March 1, 2025; 12:00 p.m., USA		at Fordham	W 90–76	19–10 (10–6)	27 – Brown	8 – Fleming	5 – Brown	Rose Hill Gymnasium (2,291); Bronx, NY
March 5, 2025; 7:00 p.m., ESPN+		Rhode Island	W 91–74	20–10 (11–6)	22 – Reynolds II	7 – Fleming	5 – Tied	Hagan Arena (2,716); Philadelphia, PA
March 8, 2025; 2:30 p.m., USA		at La Salle	L 74–81	20–11 (11–7)	22 – Reynolds II	8 – Fleming	6 – Reynolds II	Tom Gola Arena (3,000); Philadelphia, PA
A-10 tournament
March 13, 2025; 7:30 p.m., USA	(6)	vs. (14) La Salle; Second round	W 75–70	21–11	21 – Brown	8 – Fleming	5 – Finkley	Capital One Arena (7,134); Washington, D.C.
March 14, 2025; 7:30 p.m., Peacock	(6)	vs. (3) Dayton; Quarterfinals	W 73–68 ^{OT}	22–11	21 – Reynolds II	10 – Fleming	2 – Tied	Capital One Arena (8,766); Washington, D.C.
March 15, 2025; 3:30 p.m., CBSSN	(6)	vs. (2) George Mason; Semifinals	L 64–74	22–12	26 – Brown	12 – Fleming	4 – Simpson	Capital One Arena (9,355); Washington, D.C.
NIT
March 19, 2025*; 7:00 p.m., ESPN+	(3)	UAB; First round – Irvine Region	L 65–69	22–13	21 – Brown	10 – Ajogbor	4 – Brown	Hagan Arena (1,004); Philadelphia, PA
*Non-conference game. ^{#}Rankings from AP Poll. (#) Tournament seedings in parentheses. All times are in Eastern Time.
