= 2024–25 Lafayette Leopards men's basketball team =

Men's college basketball season

2024–25 Lafayette Leopards men's basketball
- Conference: Patriot League
- Record: 13–20 (7–11 Patriot)
- Head coach: Mike McGarvey (2nd season)
- Assistant coaches: Nikolai Arnold; Cameron Ayers; Sean O'Brien; Darius Dangerfield
- Home arena: Kirby Sports Center

2024–25 Patriot League men's basketball standings
	Conf.				Overall
Team	W		L	PCT	W		L	PCT
Bucknell	13	–	5	.722	18	–	15	.545
American †	13	–	5	.722	22	–	13	.629
Colgate	10	–	8	.556	14	–	19	.424
Boston University	10	–	8	.556	16	–	16	.500
Navy	10	–	8	.556	15	–	19	.441
Army	10	–	8	.556	17	–	16	.515
Lafayette	7	–	11	.389	13	–	20	.394
Loyola	6	–	12	.333	12	–	19	.387
Lehigh	6	–	12	.333	11	–	19	.367
Holy Cross	5	–	13	.278	13	–	19	.406
† 2025 Patriot League tournament winner

The 2024–25 Lafayette Leopards men's basketball team represented Lafayette College during the 2024–25 NCAA Division I men's basketball season. The Leopards, led by second-year head coach Mike McGarvey, played their home games at the Kirby Sports Center located in Easton, Pennsylvania, as members of the Patriot League.

== Previous season ==
The Leopards finished the 2023–24 season 11–20, 10–8 in Patriot League play to finish in a four-way tie for second place. As the No. 3 seed in the Patriot League tournament, they were defeated by Lehigh in the quarterfinals.

== Roster ==
2024–25 Lafayette Leopards men's basketball team
Players
Coaches

Pos.	#	Name	Height	Weight	Year	Previous school	Hometown
G	0	Ryan Pettit	6 ft 2 in (1.88 m)	185 lb (84 kg)	Jr	Rutgers Prep	Westfield, NJ
G	1	Caleb Williams	6 ft 0 in (1.83 m)	165 lb (75 kg)	Fr	Jean Ribault HS	Jacksonville, FL
G	3	Devin Hines	6 ft 4 in (1.93 m)	170 lb (77 kg)	Sr	Saint Andrew's School	West Palm Beach, FL
G	4	Folabomi Fayemi	6 ft 4 in (1.93 m)	205 lb (93 kg)	Fr	South Kent School	Chicago, IL
G	5	Alex Chaikin	6 ft 5 in (1.96 m)	170 lb (77 kg)	Fr	Trinity Episcopal School	Williamsburg, VA
G	9	TJ Berger	6 ft 4 in (1.93 m)	185 lb (84 kg)	Sr	Westtown School	Malvern, PA
G	10	Mark Butler	5 ft 10 in (1.78 m)	170 lb (77 kg)	So	William Penn Charter School	Philadelphia, PA
C	13	Misha Bednostin	6 ft 11 in (2.11 m)	245 lb (111 kg)	So	Trinity HS	Kyiv, Ukraine
F	14	Malik Rasul	6 ft 7 in (2.01 m)	200 lb (91 kg)	Fr	Westtown School	Tucson, AZ
C	15	Justin Vander Baan	7 ft 0 in (2.13 m)	240 lb (109 kg)	Sr	Boston College	Northbridge, MA
G/F	21	Andrew Phillips	6 ft 4 in (1.93 m)	210 lb (95 kg)	So	Malvern Prep	Chester Springs, PA
F	22	Chris Rubayo	6 ft 10 in (2.08 m)	235 lb (107 kg)	Sr	Montgomery HS	Skillman, NJ
G/F	23	Joshua Wyche	6 ft 7 in (2.01 m)	215 lb (98 kg)	So	Cristo Rey Philadelphia HS	Philadelphia, PA
G	99	Luka Savicevic	6 ft 3 in (1.91 m)	180 lb (82 kg)	Sr	Eastern Michigan	Skopje, North Macedonia

Head coach

- Mike McGarvey (Ursinus)

Assistant coach(es)

- Nikolai Arnold (Syracuse)
- Cameron Ayers (Bucknell)
- Sean O'Brien (Colgate)
- Darius Dangerfield (Lycoming)

Legend

- (C) Team captain
- (S) Suspended
- (I) Ineligible
- (W) Walk-on
- Injured
- Current redshirt

Roster
Last update: November 27, 2024

== Schedule and results ==
Date time, TV	Rank^{#}	Opponent^{#}	Result	Record	Site (attendance) city, state
Non-conference regular season
November 4, 2024*; 8:00 pm, FS1		at Villanova	L 63–75	0–1	Finneran Pavilion (6,501); Villanova, PA
November 9, 2024*; 3:30 pm, ESPN+		at La Salle	L 60–81	0–2	John Glaser Arena (3,001); Philadelphia, PA
November 12, 2024*; 7:00 pm, ESPN+		Penn	W 65–63	1–2	Kirby Sports Center (1,575); Easton, PA
November 16, 2024*; 12:00 pm, ESPN+		at Cornell	L 71–81	1–3	Newman Arena; Ithaca, NY
November 20, 2024*; 7:00 pm, ESPN+		at Rhode Island	L 72–86	1–4	Ryan Center (3,235); Kingston, RI
November 24, 2024*; 1:00 pm, ESPN+		Rosemont	W 91–45	2–4	Kirby Sports Center (1,064); Easton, PA
November 29, 2024*; 4:30 pm, ESPN+		LIU; Lafayette Classic	W 75–56	3–4	Kirby Sports Center (829); Easton, PA
November 30, 2024*; 4:30 pm, ESPN+		Niagara; Lafayette Classic	W 59–47	4–4	Kirby Sports Center (907); Easton, PA
December 1, 2024*; 2:30 pm, ESPN+		Binghamton; Lafayette Classic	L 81–82 ^{OT}	4–5	Kirby Sports Center (873); Easton, PA
December 7, 2024*; 7:00 pm, NEC Front Row		at Mercyhurst	W 77–73	5–5	Owen McCormick Court (300); Erie, PA
December 18, 2024*; 7:00 pm, ESPN+		at George Washington	L 62–82	5–6	Charles E. Smith Center (1,196); Washington, D.C.
December 21, 2024*; 4:00 pm, ESPN+		at Portland	L 64–74	5–7	Chiles Center (883); Portland, OR
December 29, 2024*; 1:00 pm, ESPN+		Stonehill	L 65–70	5–8	Kirby Sports Center (1,064); Easton, PA
Patriot League regular season
January 2, 2025; 7:00 pm, ESPN+		Boston University	W 60–46	6–8 (1–0)	Kirby Sports Center (1,289); Easton, PA
January 5, 2025; 2:00 pm, ESPN+		at Navy	L 70–71	6–9 (1–1)	Alumni Hall (1,564); Annapolis, MD
January 8, 2025; 7:00 pm, ESPN+		at Bucknell	L 62–65 ^{OT}	6–10 (1–2)	Sojka Pavilion (1,074); Lewisburg, PA
January 11, 2025; 1:00 pm, ESPN+		Holy Cross	W 82–65	7–10 (2–2)	Kirby Sports Center (1,276); Easton, PA
January 15, 2025; 6:00 pm, ESPN+		at Army	L 68–70	7–11 (2–3)	Christl Arena (543); West Point, NY
January 18, 2025; 1:00 pm, ESPN+		Colgate	L 67–90	7–12 (2–4)	Kirby Sports Center (1,188); Easton, PA
January 22, 2025; 7:00 pm, ESPN+		at Loyola (MD)	W 80–59	8–12 (3–4)	Reitz Arena (572); Baltimore, MD
January 25, 2025; 7:00 pm, ESPN+		at Lehigh	L 47–86	8–13 (3–5)	Stabler Arena (2,218); Bethlehem, PA
January 29, 2025; 7:00 pm, ESPN+		American	L 68–75	8–14 (3–6)	Kirby Sports Center (1,188); Easton, PA
February 1, 2025; 2:00 pm, ESPN+		at Colgate	W 76–61	9–14 (4–6)	Cotterell Court (707); Hamilton, NY
February 5, 2025; 7:00 pm, ESPN+		Loyola (MD)	L 58–71	9–15 (4–7)	Kirby Sports Center (1,556); Easton, PA
February 8, 2025; 7:00 pm, ESPN+		Navy	W 61–51	10–15 (5–7)	Kirby Sports Center (1,376); Easton, PA
February 10, 2025; 6:00 pm, CBSSN		at American	L 58–60	10–16 (5–8)	Bender Arena (920); Washington, D.C.
February 15, 2025; 1:00 pm, ESPN+		Bucknell	L 69–75	10–17 (5–9)	Kirby Sports Center (1,394); Easton, PA
February 19, 2025; 6:00 pm, ESPN+		at Holy Cross	L 69–74 ^{OT}	10–18 (5–10)	Hart Center (1,454); Worcester, MA
February 22, 2025; 5:00 pm, ESPN+		Lehigh	W 78–70	11–18 (6–10)	Kirby Sports Center (2,208); Easton, PA
February 25, 2025; 7:00 pm, ESPN+		Army	W 81–65	12–18 (7–10)	Kirby Sports Center (1,364); Easton, PA
March 1, 2025; 7:00 pm, ESPN+		at Boston University	L 64–66	12–19 (7–11)	Case Gym (1,357); Boston, MA
Patriot League tournament
March 4, 2025; 7:00 pm, ESPN+	(7)	(10) Holy Cross; First round	W 69–68	13–19	Kirby Sports Center (1,565); Easton, PA
March 6, 2025; 7:00 pm, ESPN+	(7)	at (2) American; Quarterfinals	L 69–71	13–20	Bender Arena (1,870); Washington, D.C.
*Non-conference game. ^{#}Rankings from AP Poll. (#) Tournament seedings in parentheses. All times are in Eastern.
