= 2024–25 Colgate Raiders men's basketball team =

American college basketball season

2024–25 Colgate Raiders men's basketball
- Conference: Patriot League
- Record: 14–19 (10–8 Patriot)
- Head coach: Matt Langel (14th season)
- Assistant coaches: Camryn Crocker; Trey Montgomery; Pat Moore; Damon Sherman-Newsome
- Home arena: Cotterell Court

2024–25 Patriot League men's basketball standings
	Conf.				Overall
Team	W		L	PCT	W		L	PCT
Bucknell	13	–	5	.722	18	–	15	.545
American †	13	–	5	.722	22	–	13	.629
Colgate	10	–	8	.556	14	–	19	.424
Boston University	10	–	8	.556	16	–	16	.500
Navy	10	–	8	.556	15	–	19	.441
Army	10	–	8	.556	17	–	16	.515
Lafayette	7	–	11	.389	13	–	20	.394
Loyola	6	–	12	.333	12	–	19	.387
Lehigh	6	–	12	.333	11	–	19	.367
Holy Cross	5	–	13	.278	13	–	19	.406
† 2025 Patriot League tournament winner

The 2024–25 Colgate Raiders men's basketball team represented Colgate University in the 2024–25 NCAA Division I men's basketball season. The Raiders, led by 14th-year head coach Matt Langel, played their home games at Cotterell Court located in Hamilton, New York as members of the Patriot League. They finished the season 14–19, 10–8 in Patriot League play to finish in a tie for third place. They defeated Army in the quarterfinals of the Patriot League tournament before losing to American in the semifinals. As a result, and for the first time since 2018, the Raiders failed to qualify for the NCAA tournament.

== Previous season ==
The Raiders finished the 2023–24 season 25–10, 16–2 in Patriot League play to finish as regular season champions for the fourth consecutive year. They defeated Holy Cross, Bucknell, and Lehigh to win the Patriot League tournament championship, receiving the conference's automatic bid to the NCAA tournament for the fourth consecutive year. As the No. 14 seed in the West Region, they lost in the first round to Baylor.

== Roster ==
2024–25 Colgate Raiders men's basketball team
Players
Coaches

Pos.	#	Name	Height	Weight	Year	Hometown
G	0	Julian Scott	6 ft 2 in (1.88 m)	180 lb (82 kg)	So	Rochester, MI
G	1	Brady Cummins	6 ft 6 in (1.98 m)	190 lb (86 kg)	Jr	York, ME
G	2	Blake Forrest	5 ft 11 in (1.8 m)	175 lb (79 kg)	Fr	North Bend, WA
G	3	Jalen Cox	6 ft 3 in (1.91 m)	165 lb (75 kg)	So	Los Angeles, CA
G	4	Josh Ahayere	6 ft 4 in (1.93 m)	215 lb (98 kg)	Fr	Morinville, AB
G	5	Nicolas Louis-Jacques	6 ft 4 in (1.93 m)	195 lb (88 kg)	Sr	Miami, FL
G	7	Stevie Clark	6 ft 6 in (1.98 m)	185 lb (84 kg)	Fr	Omro, WI
F	9	Cameron Brennan	7 ft 0 in (2.13 m)	230 lb (104 kg)	Fr	Burlington, ON
G	10	Chandler Baker	6 ft 5 in (1.96 m)	185 lb (84 kg)	Sr	Woodstock, GA
G	13	Kyle Carlesimo	6 ft 2 in (1.88 m)	180 lb (82 kg)	Jr	Seattle, WA
F	23	Cooper Wright	6 ft 5 in (1.96 m)	195 lb (88 kg)	So	Cambridge, MA
G	25	Parker Jones	6 ft 6 in (1.98 m)	190 lb (86 kg)	So	Sherman Oaks, CA
F	33	Sam Wright	6 ft 9 in (2.06 m)	240 lb (109 kg)	So	Hoover, AL
F	55	Jeff Woodward	6 ft 11 in (2.11 m)	270 lb (122 kg)	Sr	Audubon, PA

Head coach

- Matt Langel (Penn)

Assistant coach(es)

- Camryn Crocker (Penn)
- Trey Montgomery (Samford)
- Pat Moore (Colgate)
- Damon Sherman-Newsome (Colgate)

Legend

- (C) Team captain
- (S) Suspended
- (I) Ineligible
- (W) Walk-on
- Injured
- Current redshirt

Roster
Last update: November 9, 2024

== Schedule and results ==
Date time, TV	Rank^{#}	Opponent^{#}	Result	Record	Site (attendance) city, state
Non-conference regular season
November 5, 2024*; 7:00 pm, ESPN+		SUNY Canton	W 95–62	1–0	Cotterell Court (673); Hamilton, NY
November 9, 2024*; 2:00 pm, FloSports		at Drexel	L 56–73	1–1	Daskalakis Athletic Center (1,507); Philadelphia, PA
November 12, 2024*; 7:00 pm, ACCNX/ESPN+		at Syracuse	L 72–74	1–2	JMA Wireless Dome (19,267); Syracuse, NY
November 18, 2024*; 7:00 pm, ACCN		at NC State	L 49–72	1–3	Lenovo Center (11,692); Raleigh, NC
November 22, 2024*; 7:00 pm, ESPN+		at Harvard	L 67–78	1–4	Lavietes Pavilion (1,104); Cambridge, MA
November 27, 2024*; 7:00 pm, FloSports		at UNC Wilmington; Live Oak Bank Holiday Classic	W 72–59	2–4	Trask Coliseum (3,354); Wilmington, NC
November 29, 2024*; 12:00 pm, FloSports		vs. Appalachian State; Live Oak Bank Holiday Classic	L 50–72	2–5	Trask Coliseum (2,646); Wilmington, NC
November 30, 2024*; 12:00 pm, FloSports		vs. Sam Houston; Live Oak Bank Holiday Classic	L 78–82	2–6	Trask Coliseum (2,860); Wilmington, NC
December 4, 2024*; 7:00 pm, ESPN+		Cornell	L 57–84	2–7	Cotterell Court (907); Hamilton, NY
December 8, 2024*; 2:00 pm, FloSports		at Northeastern	L 75–78	2–8	Matthews Arena (1,009); Boston, MA
December 11, 2024*; 8:00 pm, ESPN2		at No. 5 Kentucky	L 67–78	2–9	Rupp Arena (19,646); Lexington, KY
December 15, 2024*; 2:00 pm, ESPN+		Vermont	W 65–60	3–9	Cotterell Court (653); Hamilton, NY
December 22, 2024*; 4:00 pm, ESPN+		Iona	L 73–79	3–10	Cotterell Court (787); Hamilton, NY
Patriot League regular season
January 2, 2025; 7:00 pm, ESPN+		Army	W 71–59	4–10 (1–0)	Cotterell Court (702); Hamilton, NY
January 5, 2025; 2:00 pm, ESPN+		at Bucknell	L 60–66	4–11 (1–1)	Sojka Pavilion (2,572); Lewisburg, PA
January 8, 2025; 7:00 pm, ESPN+		Lehigh	W 67–62	5–11 (2–1)	Cotterell Court (536); Hamilton, NY
January 11, 2025; 2:00 pm, ESPN+		Boston University	W 87–50	6–11 (3–1)	Cotterell Court (757); Hamilton, NY
January 15, 2025; 7:00 pm, ESPN+		at Navy	W 73–66	7–11 (4–1)	Alumni Hall (837); Annapolis, MD
January 18, 2025; 1:00 pm, ESPN+		at Lafayette	W 90–67	8–11 (5–1)	Kirby Sports Center (1,188); Easton, PA
January 20, 2025; 7:00 pm, CBSSN		Bucknell	W 87–80	9–11 (6–1)	Cotterell Court (814); Hamilton, NY
January 25, 2025; 4:00 pm, ESPN+		at American	L 77–81	9–12 (6–2)	Bender Arena (2,230); Washington, D.C.
January 29, 2025; 6:00 pm, ESPN+		at Army	L 72–84	9–13 (6–3)	Christl Arena (645); West Point, NY
February 1, 2025; 2:00 pm, ESPN+		Lafayette	L 61–76	9–14 (6–4)	Cotterell Court (707); Hamilton, NY
February 3, 2025; 7:00 pm, CBSSN		at Lehigh	L 68–94	9–15 (6–5)	Stabler Arena (951); Bethlehem, PA
February 8, 2025; 2:00 pm, ESPN+		Loyola (MD)	W 82–68	10–15 (7–5)	Cotterell Court (751); Hamilton, NY
February 12, 2025; 7:00 pm, ESPN+		at Holy Cross	W 87–65	11–15 (8–5)	Hart Center (1,088); Worcester, MA
February 15, 2025; 1:00 pm, ESPN+		at Boston University	L 91–93 ^{2OT}	11–16 (8–6)	Case Gym (993); Boston, MA
February 19, 2025; 7:00 pm, ESPN+		Navy	W 79–75	12–16 (9–6)	Cotterell Court (625); Hamilton, NY
February 23, 2025; 2:00 pm, ESPN+		at Loyola (MD)	L 65–84	12–17 (9–7)	Reitz Arena (827); Baltimore, MD
February 26, 2025; 7:00 pm, ESPN+		Holy Cross	W 81–73	13–17 (10–7)	Cotterell Court (569); Hamilton, NY
March 1, 2025; 2:00 pm, ESPN+		American	L 59–67	13–18 (10–8)	Cotterell Court (846); Hamilton, NY
Patriot League tournament
March 6, 2025; 7:00 pm, ESPN+	(3)	(6) Army; Quarterfinals	W 84–55	14–18	Cotterell Court (1,193); Hamilton, NY
March 9, 2025; 2:00 pm, CBSSN	(3)	at (2) American; Semifinals	L 62–72	14–19	Bender Arena (1,908); Washington, D.C.
*Non-conference game. ^{#}Rankings from AP Poll. (#) Tournament seedings in parentheses. All times are in Eastern.
