= 2025 Patriot League men's basketball tournament =

Conference postseason tournament

- Classification: Division I
- Season: 2024–25
- Teams: 10
- Site: Campus sites
- Champions: American (4th title)
- Winning coach: Duane Simpkins (1st title)
- Attendance: 15,573 (total); 2,578 (championship)
- Television: ESPN+, CBSSN

2024–25 Patriot League men's basketball standings
	Conf.				Overall
Team	W		L	PCT	W		L	PCT
Bucknell	13	–	5	.722	18	–	15	.545
American †	13	–	5	.722	22	–	13	.629
Colgate	10	–	8	.556	14	–	19	.424
Boston University	10	–	8	.556	16	–	16	.500
Navy	10	–	8	.556	15	–	19	.441
Army	10	–	8	.556	17	–	16	.515
Lafayette	7	–	11	.389	13	–	20	.394
Loyola	6	–	12	.333	12	–	19	.387
Lehigh	6	–	12	.333	11	–	19	.367
Holy Cross	5	–	13	.278	13	–	19	.406
† 2025 Patriot League tournament winner

The 2025 Patriot League Men's Basketball Tournament was the conference postseason tournament for the Patriot League. The tournament was held March 4–12, 2025 at campus sites of the higher seeds. The winner, American, received the conference's automatic bid to the NCAA Tournament.

== Seeds ==
All ten teams in the conference standings will qualify for the tournament. The teams will be seeded by record in conference, with a tiebreaker system to seed teams with identical conference records.

The first tiebreaker is the head-to-head records of the tied teams. If teams remain tied, the tied teams' records against the highest seeded Patriot League team not involved in the tie are compared, provided each of the tied teams played that team at least once. If the tied teams have identical winning percentages against the highest seeded team, the process works its way down the standings. Since ties are resolved sequentially starting with the no. 1 seed, teams seeded above the tied teams are considered separately rather than as a group, even if they have identical records. If the teams remain tied, the NCAA NET rankings available on the day following the conclusion of Patriot League regular-season play are used. In the event tied teams have identical NET rankings, the tied teams' winning percentages against non-Patriot League common opponents are compared. If the tie involves three or more teams, and one or more teams are superior or inferior to the others after any step, but three or more teams remain tied, the multiple-team tiebreaker process continues and does not revert to a new multiple-team tiebreaker. Multiple-team tiebreakers revert to a two-team tiebreaker, when the number of tied teams is reduced to two. In the prior season, multiple-team tiebreakers continued until they were completely resolved, even if only two teams remained tied.

Once a team is eliminated from a multiple-team tiebreaker, either by demonstrating superiority or inferiority to the remaining tied teams, it is treated as if it had not been involved in the initial tie for the purposes of applying the remaining steps in continuing the tiebreaker procedure, and such team is seeded according to the tiebreaker result. This point was relevant in applying the tiebreaker procedure to break the four-way tie for second place in 2024.

Seed	School	Conference	Tiebreaker 1	Tiebreaker 2
1	Bucknell	13–5	5–3 vs. Colgate, Boston University, Navy and Army	
2	American	13–5	4–4 vs. Colgate, Boston University, Navy and Army	
3	Colgate	10–8	4–2 vs. Boston University, Navy and Army	
4	Boston University	10–8	3–3 vs. Colgate, Navy and Army	1–1 vs. Bucknell
5	Navy	10–8	3–3 vs. Colgate, Boston University and Army	0–2 vs. Bucknell
6	Army	10–8	2–4 vs. Colgate, Boston University and Navy	
7	Lafayette	7–11		
8	Loyola	6–12	2–0 vs. Lehigh	
9	Lehigh	6–12	0–2 vs. Loyola	
10	Holy Cross	5–13		

== Schedule ==
Game	Time	Matchup	Score	Television	Attendance
First round – Tuesday, March 4
1	7:00 pm	No. 10 Holy Cross at No. 7 Lafayette	68–69	ESPN+	1,565
2	7:00 pm	No. 9 Lehigh at No. 8 Loyola	73–77	ESPN+	423
Quarterfinals – Thursday, March 6
3	7:00 pm	No. 8 Loyola at No. 1 Bucknell	72–76^{OT}	ESPN+	2,898
4	7:00 pm	No. 7 Lafayette at No. 2 American	69–71	ESPN+	1,870
5	7:00 pm	No. 6 Army at No. 3 Colgate	55–84	ESPN+	1,193
6	7:00 pm	No. 5 Navy at No. 4 Boston University	86–78	ESPN+	530
Semifinals – Sunday, March 9
7	12:00 pm	No. 5 Navy at No. 1 Bucknell	83–77	CBSSN	2,608
8	2:00 pm	No. 3 Colgate at No. 2 American	62–72	CBSSN	1,908
Championship – Wednesday, March 12
9	7:00 pm	No. 5 Navy at No. 2 American	52–74	CBSSN	2,578
*Game times in ET (UTC−5 for the first round and quarterfinals and UTC−4 for the semifinals and championship). Rankings denote tournament seed. All games hosted by higher-seeded team.

== Bracket ==
First round Tuesday, March 4, 2025; ESPN+
8	Loyola	77
9	Lehigh	73
7	Lafayette	69
10	Holy Cross	68

Quarterfinals; Thursday March 6, 2025; ESPN+
1	Bucknell	76*
8	Loyola	72
4	Boston University	78
5	Navy	86
2	American	71
7	Lafayette	69
3	Colgate	84
6	Army	55

Semifinals; Sunday, March 9, 2025; CBSSN
1	Bucknell	77
5	Navy	83
2	American	72
3	Colgate	62

Championship; Wednesday, March 12, 2025; CBSSN
5	Navy	52
2	American	74

* Denotes overtime period
