= 2024–25 Bucknell Bison men's basketball team =

American college basketball season

2024–25 Bucknell Bison men's basketball

Patriot League regular season co-champions
- Conference: Patriot League
- Record: 18–15 (13–5 Patriot)
- Head coach: John Griffin III (2nd season)
- Associate head coach: Matt Griffin
- Assistant coaches: Branden McDonald; Jesse Flannery
- Home arena: Sojka Pavilion

2024–25 Patriot League men's basketball standings
	Conf.				Overall
Team	W		L	PCT	W		L	PCT
Bucknell	13	–	5	.722	18	–	15	.545
American †	13	–	5	.722	22	–	13	.629
Colgate	10	–	8	.556	14	–	19	.424
Boston University	10	–	8	.556	16	–	16	.500
Navy	10	–	8	.556	15	–	19	.441
Army	10	–	8	.556	17	–	16	.515
Lafayette	7	–	11	.389	13	–	20	.394
Loyola	6	–	12	.333	12	–	19	.387
Lehigh	6	–	12	.333	11	–	19	.367
Holy Cross	5	–	13	.278	13	–	19	.406
† 2025 Patriot League tournament winner

The 2024–25 Bucknell Bison men's basketball team represented Bucknell University during the 2024–25 NCAA Division I men's basketball season. The Bison, led by second-year head coach John Griffin III, played their home games at Sojka Pavilion located in Lewisburg, Pennsylvania, as members of the Patriot League. They finished the season 18–15, 13–5 in Patriot League play to earn a share of the regular season championship. As the No. 1 seed in the Patriot League tournament, they defeated Loyola in the quarterfinals before losing to Navy in the semifinals.

== Previous season ==
The Bison finished the 2023–24 season 13–18, 10–8 in Patriot League play to finish in a four-way tie for second place. As the No. 5 seed in the Patriot League tournament, they defeated American in the first round before falling to eventual tournament champions Colgate.

== Roster ==
2024–25 Bucknell Bison men's basketball team
Players
Coaches

Pos.	#	Name	Height	Weight	Year	Hometown
F	0	Patrick O'Brien	6 ft 8 in (2.03 m)	220 lb (100 kg)	So	Warrenton, VA
F	1	Ian Motta	6 ft 6 in (1.98 m)	195 lb (88 kg)	Sr	Allen, TX
G	2	Jayden Williams	5 ft 10 in (1.78 m)	180 lb (82 kg)	Fr	The Bronx, NY
C	3	Noah Williamson	7 ft 0 in (2.13 m)	250 lb (113 kg)	Jr	Riga, Latvia
G	4	Josh Fulton	6 ft 6 in (1.98 m)	200 lb (91 kg)	Jr	Atlanta, GA
G	5	Elvin Edmonds IV	6 ft 2 in (1.88 m)	190 lb (86 kg)	Sr	Hopewell, VA
G	7	Matt Lange	6 ft 2 in (1.88 m)	185 lb (84 kg)	Fr	Newtown Square, PA
G	10	Brandon McCreesh	6 ft 4 in (1.93 m)	190 lb (86 kg)	So	The Bronx, NY
F	11	Brady Muller	6 ft 4 in (1.93 m)	210 lb (95 kg)	Jr	Wyckoff, NJ
G	12	Quin Berger	6 ft 2 in (1.88 m)	195 lb (88 kg)	Jr	Malvern, PA
G	13	Josh Bascoe	6 ft 0 in (1.83 m)	180 lb (82 kg)	Sr	Milton, Ontario
F	22	Ruot Bijiek	6 ft 9 in (2.06 m)	190 lb (86 kg)	Jr	Waukee, IA
F	23	Pip Ajayi	6 ft 7 in (2.01 m)	235 lb (107 kg)	Sr	Calgary, Alberta
G	24	Achile Spadone	6 ft 4 in (1.93 m)	205 lb (93 kg)	Jr	Geneva, Switzerland
G	32	Kellen Welch	6 ft 7 in (2.01 m)	185 lb (84 kg)	Fr	Richmond, VA

Head coach

- John Griffin III (Bucknell)

Assistant coach(es)

- Matt Griffin (Boston University)
- Branden McDonald (Virginia Union)
- Jesse Flannery (Johns Hopkins)

Legend

- (C) Team captain
- (S) Suspended
- (I) Ineligible
- (W) Walk-on
- Injured
- Current redshirt

Roster
Last update: November 27, 2024

== Schedule and results ==
Date time, TV	Rank^{#}	Opponent^{#}	Result	Record	Site (attendance) city, state
Exhibition
October 26, 2024*; 1:00 pm, ESPN+		at Saint Joseph's	W 88–82		Hagan Arena; Philadelphia, PA
Non-conference regular season
November 4, 2024*; 6:30 pm, FloHoops		at Delaware	W 85–73	1–0	Bob Carpenter Center (1,775); Newark, DE
November 7, 2024*; 8:00 pm, ESPN+		at Southern Indiana	W 75–69 ^{OT}	2–0	Screaming Eagles Arena (1,961); Evansville, IN
November 9, 2024*; 4:00 pm, SECN+/ESPN+		at No. 23 Kentucky	L 72–100	2–1	Rupp Arena (20,048); Lexington, KY
November 13, 2025*; 7:00 pm, ESPN+		Mount St. Mary's	L 89–93 ^{2OT}	2–2	Sojka Pavilion (1,381); Lewisburg, PA
November 16, 2024*; 12:00 pm, ESPN+		Richmond	W 80–76 ^{2OT}	3–2	Sojka Pavilion (1,255); Lewisburg, PA
November 21, 2024*; 7:00 pm, ESPN+		NJIT	W 81–64	4–2	Sojka Pavilion (719); Lewisburg, PA
November 23, 2024*; 7:00 pm, ESPN+		Rider	L 53–57	4–3	Sojka Pavilion (1,123); Lewisburg, PA
November 27, 2024*; 4:30 pm, BTN		at Maryland	L 67–91	4–4	Xfinity Center (10,744); College Park, MD
November 30, 2024*; 6:00 pm, ESPN+		vs. Siena	L 58–71	4–5	Mohegan Arena (3,079); Wilkes-Barre Township, PA
December 4, 2024*; 7:00 pm, ESPN+		St. Bonaventure	L 47–64	4–6	Sojka Pavilion (934); Lewisburg, PA
December 8, 2024*; 2:00 pm, ESPN+		at Radford	L 70–74 ^{OT}	4–7	Dedmon Center (1,118); Radford, VA
December 21, 2024*; 9:00 pm, ESPN+		at No. 13 Gonzaga	L 65–86	4–8	McCarthey Athletic Center (6,000); Spokane, WA
December 28, 2024*; 2:00 pm, The CW		at Syracuse	L 63–75	4–9	JMA Wireless Dome (15,987); Syracuse, NY
Patriot League regular season
January 2, 2025; 7:00 pm, ESPN+		at Lehigh	L 64–66 ^{OT}	4–10 (0–1)	Stabler Arena (732); Bethlehem, PA
January 5, 2025; 2:00 pm, ESPN+		Colgate	W 66–60	5–10 (1–1)	Sojka Pavilion (2,572); Lewisburg, PA
January 8, 2025; 7:00 pm, ESPN+		Lafayette	W 65–62 ^{OT}	6–10 (2–1)	Sojka Pavilion (1,074); Lewisburg, PA
January 11, 2025; 4:00 pm, ESPN+		at American	L 58–68	6–11 (2–2)	Bender Arena (2,528); Washington, D.C.
January 15, 2025; 7:00 pm, ESPN+		Holy Cross	W 86–82	7–11 (3–2)	Sojka Pavilion (1,024); Lewisburg, PA
January 18, 2025; 4:00 pm, ESPN+		Navy	W 73–69	8–11 (4–2)	Sojka Pavilion (1,464); Lewisburg, PA
January 20, 2025; 7:00 pm, ESPN+		at Colgate	L 80–87	8–12 (4–3)	Cotterell Court (814); Hamilton, NY
January 25, 2025; 1:00 pm, ESPN+		at Boston University	L 82–85 ^{OT}	8–13 (4–4)	Case Gym (905); Boston, MA
January 29, 2025; 7:00 pm, ESPN+		Loyola (MD)	W 79–67	9–13 (5–4)	Sojka Pavilion (1,007); Lewisburg, PA
February 1, 2025; 2:00 pm, ESPN+		at Navy	W 85–75	10–13 (6–4)	Alumni Hall (2,007); Annapolis, MD
February 5, 2025; 7:00 pm, ESPN+		American	W 71–49	11–13 (7–4)	Sojka Pavilion (1,365); Lewisburg, PA
February 8, 2025; 1:00 pm, ESPN+		at Army	L 110–116 ^{2OT}	11–14 (7–5)	Christl Arena (868); West Point, NY
February 12, 2025; 7:00 pm, ESPN+		Boston University	W 76–60	12–14 (8–5)	Sojka Pavilion (894); Lewisburg, PA
February 15, 2025; 1:00 pm, ESPN+		at Lafyette	W 75–69	13–14 (9–5)	Kirby Sports Center (1,394); Easton, PA
February 17, 2025; 7:00 pm, ESPN+		at Lehigh	W 67–50	14–14 (10–5)	Sojka Pavilion (1,379); Lewisburg, PA
February 23, 2025; 12:00 pm, ESPN+		Army	W 84–53	15–14 (11–5)	Sojka Pavilion (2,914); Lewisburg, PA
February 26, 2025; 7:00 pm, ESPN+		at Loyola (MD)	W 70–67	16–14 (12–5)	Reitz Arena (924); Baltimore, MD
March 1, 2025; 2:00 pm, ESPN+		at Holy Cross	W 94–81	17–14 (13–5)	Hart Center (1,227); Worcester, MA
Patriot League tournament
March 6, 2025; 7:00 pm, ESPN+	(1)	(8) Loyola (MD); Quarterfinals	W 76–72 ^{OT}	18–14	Sojka Pavilion (2,898); Lewisburg, PA
March 9, 2025; 12:00 pm, CBSSN	(1)	(5) Navy; Semifinals	L 77–83	18–15	Sojka Pavilion (2,608); Lewisburg, PA
*Non-conference game. ^{#}Rankings from AP Poll. (#) Tournament seedings in parentheses. All times are in Eastern.
