= 2024–25 American Eagles men's basketball team =

American college basketball season

2024–25 American Eagles men's basketball

Patriot League regular season co-champions Patriot League tournament champions

NCAA tournament, First Four
- Conference: Patriot League
- Record: 22–13 (13–5 Patriot)
- Head coach: Duane Simpkins (2nd season)
- Assistant coaches: Nate Bollinger; Jackie Manuel; Isaiah Tate
- Home arena: Bender Arena

2024–25 Patriot League men's basketball standings
| | Conf. | | | | Overall |
| Team | W | | L | PCT | W | | L | PCT |
|---|---|---|---|---|---|---|---|---|
| Bucknell | 13 | – | 5 | .722 | 18 | – | 15 | .545 |
| American † | 13 | – | 5 | .722 | 22 | – | 13 | .629 |
| Colgate | 10 | – | 8 | .556 | 14 | – | 19 | .424 |
| Boston University | 10 | – | 8 | .556 | 16 | – | 16 | .500 |
| Navy | 10 | – | 8 | .556 | 15 | – | 19 | .441 |
| Army | 10 | – | 8 | .556 | 17 | – | 16 | .515 |
| Lafayette | 7 | – | 11 | .389 | 13 | – | 20 | .394 |
| Loyola | 6 | – | 12 | .333 | 12 | – | 19 | .387 |
| Lehigh | 6 | – | 12 | .333 | 11 | – | 19 | .367 |
| Holy Cross | 5 | – | 13 | .278 | 13 | – | 19 | .406 |
† 2025 Patriot League tournament winner

The 2024–25 American Eagles men's basketball team represented American University during the 2024–25 NCAA Division I men's basketball season. The Eagles, led by second-year head coach Duane Simpkins, played their home games at Bender Arena in Washington, D.C. as members of the Patriot League. They finished the season 22–13, 13–5 in Patriot League play, to finish as co-regular season champions. As the No. 2 seed in the Patriot League tournament, they defeated Lafayette, Colgate, and Navy to win the tournament championship. As a result, they received the conference's automatic bid to the NCAA tournament. As a No. 16 seed in the East Region, they lost to Mount St. Mary's in the First Four.

== Previous season ==
The Eagles finished the 2023–24 season 16–15, 10–8 in Patriot League play, to finish in a four-way tie for second place. As the No. 4 seed in the Patriot League tournament, they were defeated by Bucknell in the quarterfinal round.

== Roster ==
2024–25 American Eagles men's basketball team
Players
Coaches

| Pos. | # | Name | Height | Weight | Year | Previous school | Hometown |
|---|---|---|---|---|---|---|---|
| G | 1 | Elijah Stephens | 5 ft 9 in (1.75 m) | 165 lb (75 kg) | Sr | China Spring | Waco, TX |
| G | 3 | Colin Smalls | 6 ft 2 in (1.88 m) | 185 lb (84 kg) | GS | St. Andrew's | Upper Marlboro, MD |
| G | 4 | Lincoln Ball | 6 ft 6 in (1.98 m) | 215 lb (98 kg) | GS | George Washington | Williamsport, MD |
| G | 5 | Alex Daniels | 6 ft 3 in (1.91 m) | 180 lb (82 kg) | Jr | Weatherford College | Duluth, GA |
| G | 7 | Wyatt Nausadis | 6 ft 4 in (1.93 m) | 200 lb (91 kg) | Fr | St. Francis | Traverse City, MI |
| G | 10 | Adrian Samuels | 6 ft 5 in (1.96 m) | 180 lb (82 kg) | Jr | Vanderbilt | Nashville, TN |
| G | 12 | Geoff Sprouse | 6 ft 1 in (1.85 m) | 170 lb (77 kg) | Jr | Pembroke Pines | Pembroke Pines, FL |
| F | 14 | Gibraltar Coleman | 6 ft 6 in (1.98 m) | 225 lb (102 kg) | So | Flint Hill | Lorton, VA |
| F | 15 | Matt Rogers | 6 ft 9 in (2.06 m) | 220 lb (100 kg) | GS | St. Maria Goretti | Knoxville, MD |
| G | 20 | Adam Holod | 6 ft 2 in (1.88 m) | 175 lb (79 kg) | Jr | Santiago Canyon College | Saint Paul, MN |
| F | 21 | Noah Jones | 6 ft 6 in (1.98 m) | 200 lb (91 kg) | Jr | Mount Saint Joseph | Baltimore, MD |
| G | 22 | Shane O’Reilly | 6 ft 3 in (1.91 m) | 190 lb (86 kg) | Fr | Northfield Mount Hermon | Moraga, CA |
| F | 23 | Greg Jones | 6 ft 6 in (1.98 m) | 195 lb (88 kg) | Fr | Hayfield | Alexandria, VA |
| F | 25 | Eric Michaels | 6 ft 9 in (2.06 m) | 247 lb (112 kg) | Fr | Blair Academy | Poughkeepsie, NY |
| F | 32 | Julen Iturbe | 6 ft 7 in (2.01 m) | 240 lb (109 kg) | Fr | Riverside | Greenville, SC |
| F | 33 | Matt Mayock | 6 ft 7 in (2.01 m) | 191 lb (87 kg) | So | Westtown School | Berwyn, PA |
| F | 45 | Mason Whittaker | 6 ft 9 in (2.06 m) | 210 lb (95 kg) | Sr | Christ's College | Cust, New Zealand |

Head coach

- Duane Simpkins (Maryland)

Assistant coach(es)

- Nate Bollinger (Millersville)
- Jackie Manuel (North Carolina)
- Isaiah Tate (George Mason)

Legend

- (C) Team captain
- (S) Suspended
- (I) Ineligible
- (W) Walk-on
- Injured
- Current redshirt

Roster
Last update: November 22, 2024

== Schedule and results ==
| Date time, TV | Rank^{#} | Opponent^{#} | Result | Record | Site (attendance) city, state |
Non-conference regular season
| November 4, 2024*; 7:00 p.m., ESPN+ | | at La Salle | L 52–65 | 0–1 | John Glaser Arena (2,385); Philadelphia, PA |
| November 10, 2024*; 2:00 p.m., ESPN+ | | Harvard | W 67–55 | 1–1 | Bender Arena (3,319); Washington, D.C. |
| November 12, 2024*; 7:00 p.m., ESPN+ | | at Siena | L 66–74 | 1–2 | MVP Arena (4,451); Albany, NY |
| November 15, 2024*; 8:00 p.m., ACCNX | | at No. 10 North Carolina | L 55–107 | 1–3 | Dean Smith Center (19,555); Chapel Hill, NC |
| November 18, 2024*; 7:00 p.m., ESPN+ | | at High Point | L 73–80 | 1–4 | Qubein Center (2,889); High Point, NC |
| November 22, 2024*; 4:30 p.m. | | vs. Kansas City; Puerto Rico Classic | W 64–60 | 2–4 | Coliseo Rubén Rodríguez (50); Bayamón, Puerto Rico |
| November 23, 2024*; 4:00 p.m. | | vs. Puerto Rico–Bayamón; Puerto Rico Classic | W 73–56 | 3–4 | Coliseo Rubén Rodríguez (100); Bayamón, Puerto Rico |
| November 24, 2024*; 12:00 p.m. | | vs. Albany; Puerto Rico Classic | W 81–77 | 4–4 | Coliseo Rubén Rodríguez (100); Bayamón, Puerto Rico |
| December 1, 2024*; 4:00 p.m., ESPN+ | | Notre Dame of Maryland | W 97–52 | 5–4 | Bender Arena (652); Washington, D.C. |
| December 4, 2024*; 7:00 p.m., ESPN+ | | George Washington | W 81–71 ^{OT} | 6–4 | Bender Arena (1,624); Washington, D.C. |
| December 18, 2024*; 7:00 p.m., ESPN+ | | at Saint Joseph's | L 57–84 | 6–5 | Hagan Arena (1,258); Philadelphia, PA |
| December 22, 2024*; 2:00 p.m., ACCN | | at Virginia | L 58–63 | 6–6 | John Paul Jones Arena (12,384); Charlottesville, VA |
| December 29, 2024*; 4:00 p.m., ESPN+ | | UMBC | L 93–96 ^{2OT} | 6–7 | Bender Arena (783); Washington, D.C. |
Patriot League regular season
| January 2, 2025; 7:00 p.m., ESPN+ | | at Navy | L 58–81 | 6–8 (0–1) | Alumni Hall (825); Annapolis, MD |
| January 5, 2025; 4:00 p.m., ESPN+ | | Holy Cross | W 75–64 | 7–8 (1–1) | Bender Arena (820); Washington, D.C. |
| January 8, 2025; 7:00 p.m., ESPN+ | | at Boston University | L 54–60 | 7–9 (1–2) | Case Gym (357); Boston, MA |
| January 11, 2025; 4:00 p.m., ESPN+ | | Bucknell | W 68–58 | 8–9 (2–2) | Bender Arena (2,528); Washington, D.C. |
| January 13, 2025; 7:00 p.m., CBSSN | | at Loyola (MD) | W 73–54 | 9–9 (3–2) | Reitz Arena (1,312); Baltimore, MD |
| January 18, 2025; 2:00 p.m., ESPN+ | | at Holy Cross | W 74–65 | 10–9 (4–2) | Hart Center (1,221); Worcester, MA |
| January 22, 2025; 7:00 p.m., ESPN+ | | Lehigh | W 68–67 | 11–9 (5–2) | Bender Arena (966); Washington, D.C. |
| January 25, 2025; 4:00 p.m., ESPN+ | | Colgate | W 81–77 | 12–9 (6–2) | Bender Arena (2,230); Washington, D.C. |
| January 29, 2025; 7:00 p.m., ESPN+ | | at Lafayette | W 75–68 | 13–9 (7–2) | Kirby Sports Center (1,188); Easton, PA |
| February 1, 2025; 2:00 p.m., ESPN+ | | Army | W 71–68 | 14–9 (8–2) | Bender Arena (1,707); Washington, D.C. |
| February 5, 2025; 7:00 p.m., ESPN+ | | at Bucknell | L 49–71 | 14–10 (8–3) | Sojka Pavilion (1,365); Lewisburg, PA |
| February 8, 2025; 2:00 p.m., ESPN+ | | at Lehigh | W 78–75 ^{OT} | 15–10 (9–3) | Stabler Arena (884); Bethlehem, PA |
| February 10, 2025; 6:00 p.m., CBSSN | | Lafayette | W 60–58 | 16–10 (10–3) | Bender Arena (920); Washington, D.C. |
| February 15, 2025; 4:00 p.m., ESPN+ | | Loyola (MD) | W 72–51 | 17–10 (11–3) | Bender Arena (1,428); Washington, D.C. |
| February 19, 2025; 6:00 p.m., ESPN+ | | at Army | L 69–76 | 17–11 (11–4) | Christl Arena (695); West Point, NY |
| February 22, 2025; 4:00 p.m., ESPN+ | | Boston University | W 48–44 | 18–11 (12–4) | Bender Arena (1,628); Washington, D.C. |
| February 26, 2025; 7:00 pm, ESPN+ | | Navy | L 60–68 | 18–12 (12–5) | Bender Arena (1,129); Washington, D.C. |
| March 1, 2025; 2:00 p.m., ESPN+ | | at Colgate | W 67–59 | 19–12 (13–5) | Cotterell Court (846); Hamilton, NY |
Patriot League tournament
| March 6, 2025; 7:00 p.m., ESPN+ | (2) | (7) Lafayette; Quarterfinals | W 71–69 | 20–12 | Bender Arena (1,870); Washington, D.C. |
| March 9, 2025; 2:00 p.m., CBSSN | (2) | (3) Colgate; Semifinals | W 72–62 | 21–12 | Bender Arena (1,908); Washington, D.C. |
| March 12, 2025; 7:00 p.m., CBSSN | (2) | (5) Navy; Championship | W 74–52 | 22–12 | Bender Arena (2,578); Washington, D.C. |
NCAA tournament
| March 19, 2025*; 6:40 p.m., TruTV | (16 E) | vs. (16 E) Mount St. Mary's; First Four | L 72–83 | 22–13 | UD Arena (12,546); Dayton, OH |
*Non-conference game. ^{#}Rankings from AP poll. (#) Tournament seedings in parentheses. E=East. All times are in Eastern.
