= 2024–25 Siena Saints men's basketball team =

American college basketball season

2024–25 Siena Saints men's basketball
- Conference: Metro Atlantic Athletic Conference
- Record: 14–18 (9–11 MAAC)
- Head coach: Gerry McNamara (1st season)
- Assistant coaches: Ben Lee; Ryan Blackwell; Arinze Onuaku
- Home arena: MVP Arena

2024–25 MAAC men's basketball standings
	Conf.				Overall
Team	W		L	PCT	W		L	PCT
Quinnipiac	15	–	5	.750	20	–	13	.606
Merrimack	14	–	6	.700	18	–	15	.545
Marist	13	–	7	.650	20	–	10	.667
Iona	12	–	8	.600	17	–	17	.500
Manhattan	12	–	8	.600	17	–	14	.548
Mount St. Mary's †	12	–	8	.600	23	–	13	.639
Sacred Heart	10	–	10	.500	15	–	18	.455
Rider	9	–	11	.450	14	–	19	.424
Siena	9	–	11	.450	14	–	18	.438
Fairfield	8	–	12	.400	12	–	20	.375
Saint Peter's	7	–	13	.350	12	–	16	.429
Niagara	6	–	14	.300	11	–	20	.355
Canisius	3	–	17	.150	3	–	28	.097
† 2025 MAAC tournament winner

The 2024–25 Siena Saints men's basketball team represented Siena College during the 2024–25 NCAA Division I men's basketball season. The Saints, led by first-year head coach Gerry McNamara, played their home games at MVP Arena in Albany, New York as members of the Metro Atlantic Athletic Conference.

== Previous season ==
The Saints finished the 2023–24 season 4–28, 3–17 in MAAC play to finish in last place. They were defeated by Niagara in the first round of the MAAC tournament.

On March 20, 2024, the school announced the firing of head coach Carmen Maciariello, after five years at the helm. On March 29, the school announced that they would be hiring longtime Syracuse assistant coach Gerry McNamara as the team's new head coach.

== Roster ==
2024–25 Siena Saints men's basketball team
Players
Coaches

Pos.	#	Name	Height	Weight	Year	Previous school	Hometown
G	0	Justice Shoats	5 ft 11 in (1.8 m)	175 lb (79 kg)	Jr	Lock Haven	Wilkes-Barre, Pennsylvania
G	1	Chris Torres (W)	6 ft 2 in (1.88 m)	175 lb (79 kg)	Fr	Millbrook School	Suffern, New York
G	2	Bralyn Smith	6 ft 5 in (1.96 m)	175 lb (79 kg)	So	St. Benedict's Prep	Grand Prairie, Texas
G	3	Major Freeman (C)	6 ft 3 in (1.91 m)	190 lb (86 kg)	Jr	Spartanburg Methodist College	Atlanta, Georgia
F	5	Myles Wilmoth	6 ft 10 in (2.08 m)	220 lb (100 kg)	GS	Hofstra	Chestnut Ridge, New York
F	7	Tajae Jones	6 ft 8 in (2.03 m)	205 lb (93 kg)	Fr	Long Island Lutheran High School	Waterbury, Connecticut
G	8	Mosi Clayton	6 ft 1 in (1.85 m)	180 lb (82 kg)	So	Believe Prep	Brooklyn, New York
F	11	Michael Ojo	6 ft 7 in (2.01 m)	210 lb (95 kg)	So	Moravian Prep	Virginia Beach, Virginia
G	12	Reid Ducharme	6 ft 7 in (2.01 m)	190 lb (86 kg)	RS Fr	Xavier	Milton, Massachusetts
C	13	Peter Carey	6 ft 11 in (2.11 m)	205 lb (93 kg)	RS So	Syracuse	Sunderland, Massachusetts
G	14	Gavin Doty	6 ft 5 in (1.96 m)	185 lb (84 kg)	Fr	Fulton High School	Fulton, New York
G	15	Luke Cecchi (W)	6 ft 2 in (1.88 m)	185 lb (84 kg)	GS	Thomas Aquinas (MA)	Cazenovia, New York
G	20	Kyle Winters	6 ft 3 in (1.91 m)	200 lb (91 kg)	So	New Hampton School	Corte Madera, California
F	21	Brendan Coyle (C)	6 ft 7 in (2.01 m)	205 lb (93 kg)	Jr	Cushing Academy	Niskayuna, New York
C	22	Devin Brafford	7 ft 1 in (2.16 m)	205 lb (93 kg)	Fr	PHHoenix Prep	Waynesville, North Carolina
G	24	Cooper Nadler (W)	6 ft 5 in (1.96 m)	195 lb (88 kg)	Fr	Glens Falls High School	Lake George, New York
G	44	Marcus Jackson (C)	6 ft 2 in (1.88 m)	185 lb (84 kg)	Jr	Albany	Amsterdam, New York

Head coach

- Gerry McNamara (Syracuse)

Assistant coach(es)

- Ben Lee (Union (NY))
- Ryan Blackwell (Syracuse)
- Arinze Onuaku (Syracuse)

Legend

- (C) Team captain
- (S) Suspended
- (I) Ineligible
- (W) Walk-on
- Injured
- Current redshirt

Roster
Last update: November 9, 2024

== Schedule and results ==
Date time, TV	Rank^{#}	Opponent^{#}	Result	Record	Site (attendance) city, state
Exhibition
October 26, 2024*; 2:00 pm, ESPN+		Hobart	W 75–53	–	UHY Center (1,341); Loudonville, NY
Regular season
November 4, 2024*; 7:00 pm, ESPN+		Brown	W 72–71 ^{OT}	1–0	MVP Arena (4,483); Albany, NY
November 8, 2024*; 7:00 pm, ESPN+		at Bryant	W 90–88 ^{OT}	2–0	Chace Athletic Center (703); Smithfield, RI
November 12, 2024*; 7:00 pm, ESPN+		American	W 74–66	3–0	MVP Arena (4,451); Albany, NY
November 16, 2024*; 7:00 pm, ESPN+		at Albany; Albany Cup	L 60–70	3–1	Broadview Center (3,899); Albany, NY
November 20, 2024*; 6:30 pm, FS1		at Xavier; Fort Myers Tip-Off campus site game	L 55–80	3–2	Cintas Center (10,067); Cincinnati, OH
November 25, 2024*; 11:00 am, PassThaBall Live		vs. Miami (OH); Fort Myers Tip-Off Palms Division semifinals	L 58–70	3–3	Suncoast Credit Union Arena; Fort Myers, FL
November 26, 2024*; 11:00 am, PassThaBall Live		vs. Jacksonville; Fort Myers Tip-Off Palms Division 3rd place game	L 64–75	3–4	Suncoast Credit Union Arena (350); Fort Myers, FL
November 30, 2024*; 6:00 pm, ESPN+		vs. Bucknell	W 71–58	4–4	Mohegan Arena (3,079); Wilkes-Barre Township, PA
December 6, 2024; 6:30 pm, ESPN+		at Niagara	L 68–69	4–5 (0–1)	Gallagher Center (1,050); Lewiston, NY
December 8, 2024; 1:00 pm, ESPN+		at Canisius	W 66–53	5–5 (1–1)	Koessler Athletic Center (816); Buffalo, NY
December 17, 2024*; 7:00 pm, ESPN+		St. Bonaventure; Franciscan Cup	L 48–65	5–6	MVP Arena (5,101); Albany, NY
December 20, 2024*; 7:00 pm, ESPN+		Holy Cross	L 70–78	5–7	MVP Arena (4,766); Albany, NY
December 30, 2024*; 4:00 pm, ESPN+		at Cornell	W 83–77	6–7	Newman Arena (1,257); Ithaca, NY
January 3, 2025; 7:00 pm, ESPN+		Manhattan	W 103–95 ^{2OT}	7–7 (2–1)	MVP Arena (4,927); Albany, NY
January 5, 2025; 2:00 pm, ESPN+		Iona	L 73–74	7–8 (2–2)	MVP Arena (5,225); Albany, NY
January 10, 2025; 7:00 pm, ESPN+		at Quinnipiac	L 53–72	7–9 (2–3)	M&T Bank Arena (1,187); Hamden, CT
January 16, 2025; 7:00 pm, ESPN+		Sacred Heart	W 93–75	8–9 (3–3)	MVP Arena (4,362); Albany, NY
January 18, 2025; 3:00 pm, ESPN+		at Merrimack	L 58–64	8–10 (3–4)	Hammel Court (1,533); North Andover, MA
January 23, 2025; 7:00 pm, ESPN+		Mount St. Mary's	W 82–68	9–10 (4–4)	MVP Arena (4,444); Albany, NY
January 25, 2025; 1:00 pm, ESPN+		at Iona	L 68–72	9–11 (4–5)	Hynes Athletics Center (1,643); New Rochelle, NY
January 31, 2025; 7:00 pm, ESPN+		at Marist	L 67–72	9–12 (4–6)	McCann Arena (3,200); Poughkeepsie, NY
February 2, 2025; 2:00 pm, ESPN+		Quinnipiac	W 84–75	10–12 (5–6)	MVP Arena (6,469); Albany, NY
February 6, 2025; 7:00 pm, ESPN+		Saint Peter's	W 77–63	11–12 (6–6)	MVP Arena (4,852); Albany, NY
February 8, 2025; 7:00 pm, ESPN+		at Rider	L 59–61	11–13 (6–7)	Alumni Gymnasium (1,068); Lawrenceville, NJ
February 14, 2025; 7:00 pm, ESPN+		Marist	L 64–65	11–14 (6–8)	MVP Arena (4,950); Albany, NY
February 16, 2025; 12:00 pm, ESPN+		at Sacred Heart	W 80–73	12–14 (7–8)	William H. Pitt Center (1,633); Fairfield, CT
February 21, 2025; 7:00 pm, ESPN+		Niagara	W 94–60	13–14 (8–8)	MVP Arena (5,166); Albany, NY
February 23, 2025; 2:00 pm, ESPN+		Canisius	L 88–93	13–15 (8–9)	MVP Arena (5,838); Albany, NY
March 2, 2025; 2:00 pm, ESPN+		at Mount St. Mary's	L 79–85	13–16 (8–10)	Knott Arena (1,425); Emmitsburg, MD
March 6, 2025; 7:00 pm, ESPN+		Fairfield	W 68–64	14–16 (9–10)	MVP Arena (5,575); Albany, NY
March 8, 2025; 2:00 pm, ESPN+		at Manhattan	L 66–78	14–17 (9–11)	Draddy Gymnasium (1,320); Riverdale, NY
MAAC tournament
March 11, 2025; 6:00 pm, ESPN+	(9)	vs. (8) Rider; First round	L 76–78	14–18	Boardwalk Hall; Atlantic City, NJ
*Non-conference game. ^{#}Rankings from AP Poll. (#) Tournament seedings in parentheses. All times are in Eastern.
