= 2024–25 Lehigh Mountain Hawks men's basketball team =

American college basketball season

2024–25 Lehigh Mountain Hawks men's basketball
- Conference: Patriot League
- Record: 11–19 (6–12 Patriot)
- Head coach: Brett Reed (18th season)
- Assistant coaches: Willie Jenkins; Manny Adako; Brian Kennedy
- Home arena: Stabler Arena

2024–25 Patriot League men's basketball standings
| | Conf. | | | | Overall |
| Team | W | | L | PCT | W | | L | PCT |
|---|---|---|---|---|---|---|---|---|
| Bucknell | 13 | – | 5 | .722 | 18 | – | 15 | .545 |
| American † | 13 | – | 5 | .722 | 22 | – | 13 | .629 |
| Colgate | 10 | – | 8 | .556 | 14 | – | 19 | .424 |
| Boston University | 10 | – | 8 | .556 | 16 | – | 16 | .500 |
| Navy | 10 | – | 8 | .556 | 15 | – | 19 | .441 |
| Army | 10 | – | 8 | .556 | 17 | – | 16 | .515 |
| Lafayette | 7 | – | 11 | .389 | 13 | – | 20 | .394 |
| Loyola | 6 | – | 12 | .333 | 12 | – | 19 | .387 |
| Lehigh | 6 | – | 12 | .333 | 11 | – | 19 | .367 |
| Holy Cross | 5 | – | 13 | .278 | 13 | – | 19 | .406 |
† 2025 Patriot League tournament winner

The 2024–25 Lehigh Mountain Hawks men's basketball team represented Lehigh University during the 2024–25 NCAA Division I men's basketball season. The Mountain Hawks, led by 18th-year head coach Brett Reed, played their home games at Stabler Arena located in Bethlehem, Pennsylvania as members of the Patriot League.

== Previous season ==
The Mountain Hawks finished the 2023–24 season 14–18, 9–9 in Patriot League play, to finish in sixth place. As the No. 6 seed in the Patriot League tournament, they defeated Lafayette and Boston University, before falling to Colgate in the conference title game.

== Roster ==
2024–25 Lehigh Mountain Hawks men's basketball team
Players
Coaches

| Pos. | # | Name | Height | Weight | Year | Hometown |
|---|---|---|---|---|---|---|
| G | 0 | Cam Gillus | 5 ft 11 in (1.8 m) | 180 lb (82 kg) | So | Falls Church, VA |
| G | 1 | Nasir Whitlock | 6 ft 2 in (1.88 m) | 175 lb (79 kg) | So | Plymouth, MN |
| G | 2 | Ben Knostman | 6 ft 5 in (1.96 m) | 185 lb (84 kg) | Sr | Dayton, OH |
| G | 4 | Joshua Ingram | 6 ft 4 in (1.93 m) | 175 lb (79 kg) | So | Metuchen, NJ |
| F | 5 | Edouard Benoit | 6 ft 8 in (2.03 m) | 207 lb (94 kg) | Fr | Montreal, QC |
| G | 11 | Brendan Reed | 6 ft 0 in (1.83 m) | 170 lb (77 kg) | Jr | Bethlehem, PA |
| G | 13 | Keith Jr. Higgins | 6 ft 4 in (1.93 m) | 200 lb (91 kg) | Sr | West Hills, CA |
| F | 15 | Alfredo Addesa | 6 ft 10 in (2.08 m) | 205 lb (93 kg) | Fr | Monza, Italy |
| F | 21 | Jake Pike | 6 ft 8 in (2.03 m) | 210 lb (95 kg) | So | Houston, TX |
| G | 22 | Tyler Whitney-Sidney | 6 ft 2 in (1.88 m) | 180 lb (82 kg) | Sr | Somerville, MA |
| F | 23 | Bube Momah | 6 ft 8 in (2.03 m) | 240 lb (109 kg) | Jr | Unionville, CT |
| G | 25 | Peter Kramer | 6 ft 5 in (1.96 m) | 185 lb (84 kg) | Fr | Allison Park, PA |
| C | 32 | Henri Adiassa | 6 ft 11 in (2.11 m) | 240 lb (109 kg) | Jr | Yaoundé, Cameroon |
| F/C | 35 | Hank Alvey | 6 ft 9 in (2.06 m) | 240 lb (109 kg) | Fr | Mapleton, IL |
| C | 44 | Tommy Conniff | 6 ft 11 in (2.11 m) | 260 lb (118 kg) | Jr | Summit, NJ |

Head coach

- Brett Reed (Wayne State (MI))

Assistant coach(es)

- Manny Adako (Northeastern)
- Willie Jenkins (Tennessee Tech)
- Brian Kennedy (Monmouth)

Legend

- (C) Team captain
- (S) Suspended
- (I) Ineligible
- (W) Walk-on
- Injured
- Current redshirt

Roster
Last update: November 19, 2024

== Schedule and results ==
| Date time, TV | Rank^{#} | Opponent^{#} | Result | Record | Site (attendance) city, state |
Non-conference regular season
| November 4, 2024*; 8:00 p.m., Peacock | | at Northwestern | L 46–90 | 0–1 | Welsh–Ryan Arena (5,521); Evanston, IL |
| November 6, 2024*; 7:00 p.m., FS2 | | at Georgetown | L 77–85 | 0–2 | McDonough Gymnasium (2,008); Washington, D.C. |
| November 12, 2024*; 7:00 p.m., ESPN+ | | at Columbia | L 75–76 | 0–3 | Levien Gymnasium (702); New York, NY |
| November 15, 2024*; 10:00 p.m., B1G+ | | at UCLA | L 45–85 | 0–4 | Pauley Pavilion (4,484); Los Angeles, CA |
| November 20, 2024*; 7:00 p.m., ESPN+ | | Valley Forge | W 100–53 | 1–4 | Stabler Arena (625); Bethlehem, PA |
| November 26, 2024*; 7:00 p.m., NEC Front Row | | at Saint Francis (PA) | L 78–88 | 1–5 | DeGol Arena (846); Loretto, PA |
| November 30, 2024*; 7:00 p.m., ESPN+ | | Marist | W 74–69 | 2–5 | Stabler Arena (648); Bethlehem, PA |
| December 4, 2024*; 7:00 p.m., ESPN+ | | Monmouth | W 90–63 | 3–5 | Stabler Arena (473); Bethlehem, PA |
| December 7, 2024*; 2:00 p.m., ESPN+ | | at Dayton | L 62–86 | 3–6 | UD Arena (13,407); Dayton, OH |
| December 21, 2024*; 1:00 p.m., NEC Front Row | | at LIU | W 60–59 | 4–6 | Steinberg Wellness Center (318); Brooklyn, NY |
| December 29, 2024*; 3:30 p.m., ESPN+ | | Neumann | W 87–67 | 5–6 | Stabler Arena (764); Bethlehem, PA |
Patriot League regular season
| January 2, 2025; 7:00 p.m., ESPN+ | | Bucknell | W 66–64 ^{OT} | 6–6 (1–0) | Stabler Arena (732); Bethlehem, PA |
| January 5, 2025; 1:00 p.m., ESPN+ | | at Loyola (MD) | L 74–80 | 6–7 (1–1) | Reitz Arena (467); Baltimore, MD |
| January 8, 2025; 7:00 p.m., ESPN+ | | at Colgate | L 62–67 | 6–8 (1–2) | Cotterell Court (536); Hamilton, NY |
| January 11, 2025; 2:00 p.m., ESPN+ | | Army | L 69–74 | 6–9 (1–3) | Stabler Arena (891); Bethlehem, PA |
| January 15, 2025; 6:00 p.m., ESPN+ | | at Boston University | L 58–63 | 6–10 (1–4) | Case Gym (670); Boston, MA |
| January 18, 2025; 2:00 p.m., ESPN+ | | Loyola (MD) | L 60–76 | 6–11 (1–5) | Stabler Arena (918); Bethlehem, PA |
| January 22, 2025; 7:00 p.m., ESPN+ | | at American | L 67–68 | 6–12 (1–6) | Bender Arena (966); Washington, D.C. |
| January 25, 2025; 7:00 p.m., ESPN+ | | Lafayette | W 86–47 | 7–12 (2–6) | Stabler Arena (2,218); Bethlehem, PA |
| January 29, 2025; 7:00 p.m., ESPN+ | | Navy | L 54–79 | 7–13 (2–7) | Stabler Arena (796); Bethlehem, PA |
| February 1, 2025; 4:30 p.m., ESPN+ | | at Holy Cross | W 69–67 | 8–13 (3–7) | Hart Center (1,832); Worcester, MA |
| February 3, 2025; 7:00 p.m., CBSSN | | Colgate | W 94–68 | 9–13 (4–7) | Stabler Arena (951); Bethlehem, PA |
| February 8, 2025; 2:00 p.m., ESPN+ | | American | L 75–78 ^{OT} | 9–14 (4–8) | Stabler Arena (884); Bethlehem, PA |
| February 12, 2025; 7:00 p.m., ESPN+ | | at Navy | L 60–63 | 9–15 (4–9) | Alumni Hall (892); Annapolis, MD |
| February 15, 2025; 2:00 p.m., ESPN+ | | Holy Cross | W 72–68 | 10–15 (5–9) | Stabler Arena (743); Bethlehem, PA |
| February 17, 2025; 7:00 p.m., CBSSN | | at Bucknell | L 50–67 | 10–16 (5–10) | Sojka Pavilion (1,379); Lewisburg, PA |
| February 22, 2025; 5:00 p.m., ESPN+ | | at Lafayette | L 70–78 | 10–17 (5–11) | Kirby Sports Center (2,208); Easton, PA |
| February 26, 2025; 6:00 p.m., ESPN+ | | Boston University | L 68–79 | 10–18 (5–12) | Stabler Arena (709); Bethlehem, PA |
| March 1, 2025; 1:00 p.m., ESPN+ | | at Army | W 89–67 | 11–18 (6–12) | Christl Arena (917); West Point, NY |
Patriot League tournament
| March 4, 2025; 7:00 p.m., ESPN+ | (9) | at (8) Loyola (MD); First round | L 73–77 | 11–19 | Reitz Arena (423); Baltimore, MD |
*Non-conference game. ^{#}Rankings from AP poll. (#) Tournament seedings in parentheses. All times are in Eastern.
