= 2024–25 Loyola Greyhounds men's basketball team =

American college basketball season

2024–25 Loyola Greyhounds men's basketball
- Conference: Patriot League
- Record: 12–19 (6–12 Patriot)
- Head coach: Josh Loeffler (1st season)
- Assistant coaches: Matt Blue; Kevin Farrell; Ricky Hernandez; Khyle Diaz
- Home arena: Reitz Arena

2024–25 Patriot League men's basketball standings
	Conf.				Overall
Team	W		L	PCT	W		L	PCT
Bucknell	13	–	5	.722	18	–	15	.545
American †	13	–	5	.722	22	–	13	.629
Colgate	10	–	8	.556	14	–	19	.424
Boston University	10	–	8	.556	16	–	16	.500
Navy	10	–	8	.556	15	–	19	.441
Army	10	–	8	.556	17	–	16	.515
Lafayette	7	–	11	.389	13	–	20	.394
Loyola	6	–	12	.333	12	–	19	.387
Lehigh	6	–	12	.333	11	–	19	.367
Holy Cross	5	–	13	.278	13	–	19	.406
† 2025 Patriot League tournament winner

The 2024–25 Loyola Greyhounds men's basketball team represented Loyola University Maryland during the 2024–25 NCAA Division I men's basketball season. The Greyhounds, led by first-year head coach Josh Loeffler, played their home games at Reitz Arena in Baltimore, Maryland as members of the Patriot League.

The Greyhounds finished the season 12–19, 6–12 in Patriot League play, to finish in a tie for eighth place. They defeated Lehigh before falling to top-seeded Bucknell in the quarterfinals of the Patriot League tournament.

== Previous season ==
The Greyhounds finished the 2023–24 season with a record 7–24, 5–13 in Patriot League play, to finish in last place. As the No. 10 seed in the Patriot League tournament, they were defeated by Navy in the first round.

On March 8, 2024, head coach Tavaras Hardy announced his resignation from Loyola Maryland after six years at the helm.

== Roster ==
2024–25 Loyola Greyhounds men's basketball team
Players
Coaches

Pos.	#	Name	Height	Weight	Year	Previous school	Hometown
G	1	Veljko Ilic	6 ft 10 in (2.08 m)	240 lb (109 kg)	Sr	Hoosac School	Gornji Milanovac, Serbia
G	2	Troy Jr. Cicero	6 ft 2 in (1.88 m)	185 lb (84 kg)	So	Romeoville High School	Joliet, IL
G	3	Jordan Stiemke	6 ft 5 in (1.96 m)	205 lb (93 kg)	So	Loomis Chaffee School	Bel Air, MD
G	4	Greg Guidinger	6 ft 6 in (1.98 m)	190 lb (86 kg)	Fr	Central York High School	York, PA
G	5	Peter Sposito	6 ft 2 in (1.88 m)	185 lb (84 kg)	Jr	Choate Rosemary Hall	Glastonbury, CT
G	6	Jacob Theodosiou	6 ft 4 in (1.93 m)	190 lb (86 kg)	So	Wyoming	Waterloo, ON
G	7	Braeden Speed	6 ft 3 in (1.91 m)	180 lb (82 kg)	Fr	Brophy Prep	Phoenix, AZ
G	8	Goap Kodi	6 ft 10 in (2.08 m)	225 lb (102 kg)	Fr	Georgetown Prep	Woodbridge, VA
F	11	Milos Ilic	6 ft 10 in (2.08 m)	235 lb (107 kg)	Sr	Hoosac School	Gornji Milanovac, Serbia
G	13	Ben Menker	6 ft 5 in (1.96 m)	210 lb (95 kg)	Fr	William Mason High School	Mason, OH
G	14	Garrett Brennan	6 ft 4 in (1.93 m)	197 lb (89 kg)	Jr	St. Stephen's & St. Agnes School	Reston, VA
G	15	Tyson Commander	6 ft 4 in (1.93 m)	185 lb (84 kg)	So	The John Carroll School	Belcamp, MD
G	20	Chris Kuzemka	6 ft 0 in (1.83 m)	183 lb (83 kg)	Sr	Centreville High School	Clifton, VA
G	22	Samuel Gibbs	6 ft 3 in (1.91 m)	195 lb (88 kg)	Jr	Archbishop Stepinac High School	Rye, NY
G	23	David III Brown	6 ft 5 in (1.96 m)	208 lb (94 kg)	Sr	Bishop McNamara High School	La Plata, MD
G	30	Matt Gray	6 ft 8 in (2.03 m)	205 lb (93 kg)	So	Northfield Mount Hermon School	Ashburn, VA

Head coach

- Josh Loeffler (Swarthmore)

Assistant coach(es)

- Matt Blue (St. Lawrence)
- Kevin Farrell (Loyola (MD))
- Ricky Hernandez (West Chester)
- Khyle Diaz (Keystone College)

Legend

- (C) Team captain
- (S) Suspended
- (I) Ineligible
- (W) Walk-on
- Injured
- Current redshirt

Roster
Last update: November 22, 2024

== Schedule and results ==
Date time, TV	Rank^{#}	Opponent^{#}	Result	Record	Site (attendance) city, state
Non-conference regular season
November 4, 2024*; 7:00 p.m., ESPN+		Columbia	L 78–81	0–1	Reitz Arena (1,104); Baltimore, MD
November 9, 2024*; 7:30 p.m., ESPN+		Lancaster Bible	W 83–42	1–1	Reitz Arena (721); Baltimore, MD
November 12, 2024*; 7:00 p.m., ESPN+		at NJIT	W 68–50	2–1	Wellness and Events Center (555); Newark, NJ
November 16, 2024*; 7:00 p.m., MASN		at VCU	L 57–83	2–2	Siegel Center (7,637); Richmond, VA
November 19, 2024*; 6:00 p.m., ACCNX/ESPN+		at Boston College	L 61–82	2–3	Conte Forum (3,102); Chestnut Hill, MA
November 26, 2024*; 7:00 p.m., ESPN+		VMI	W 70–67	3–3	Reitz Arena (428); Baltimore, MD
December 2, 2024*; 7:00 p.m., ESPN+		at Coppin State	W 68–57	4–3	Physical Education Complex (374); Baltimore, MD
December 7, 2024*; 2:00 p.m., ESPN+		at Delaware State	L 77–80	4–4	Memorial Hall (151); Dover, DE
December 14, 2024*; 7:00 p.m., ESPN+		at Mount St. Mary's	W 77–69	5–4	Knott Arena (1,527); Emmitsburg, MD
December 21, 2024*; 1:00 p.m., ESPN+		Hampton	L 68–76	5–5	Reitz Arena (524); Baltimore, MD
December 28, 2024*; 2:00 p.m., FS1		at DePaul	L 65–84	5–6	Wintrust Arena (4,386); Chicago, IL
Patriot League regular season
January 2, 2025; 6:00 p.m., ESPN+		at Holy Cross	L 72–74	5–7 (0–1)	Hart Center (899); Worcester, MA
January 5, 2025; 1:00 p.m., ESPN+		Lehigh	W 80–74	6–7 (1–1)	Reitz Arena (467); Baltimore, MD
January 8, 2025; 6:00 p.m., ESPN+		at Army	L 72–74	6–8 (1–2)	Christl Arena (570); West Point, NY
January 11, 2025; 5:00 p.m., ESPN+		Navy	W 75–74	7–8 (2–2)	Reitz Arena (842); Baltimore, MD
January 13, 2025; 7:00 p.m., CBSSN		American	L 54–73	7–9 (2–3)	Reitz Arena (1,312); Baltimore, MD
January 18, 2025; 2:00 p.m., ESPN+		at Lehigh	W 76–60	8–9 (3–3)	Stabler Arena (918); Bethlehem, PA
January 22, 2024; 7:00 p.m., ESPN+		Lafayette	L 59–80	8–10 (3–4)	Reitz Arena (572); Baltimore, MD
January 25, 2025; 2:00 p.m., ESPN+		Holy Cross	L 65–70	8–11 (3–5)	Reitz Arena (824); Baltimore, MD
January 29, 2025; 7:00 p.m., ESPN+		at Bucknell	L 67–79	8–12 (3–6)	Sojka Pavilion (1,007); Lewisburg, PA
February 1, 2025; 2:00 p.m., ESPN+		Boston University	W 69–67	9–12 (4–6)	Reitz Arena (816); Baltimore, MD
February 5, 2025; 7:00 p.m., ESPN+		at Lafayette	W 71–58	10–12 (5–6)	Kirby Sports Center (1,556); Easton, PA
February 8, 2025; 2:00 p.m., ESPN+		at Colgate	L 68–82	10–13 (5–7)	Cotterell Court (751); Hamilton, NY
February 12, 2025; 7:00 p.m., ESPN+		Army	L 60–64	10–14 (5–8)	Reitz Arena (914); Baltimore, MD
February 15, 2025; 4:00 p.m., ESPN+		at American	L 51–72	10–15 (5–9)	Burr Gymnasium (1,428); Washington, D.C.
February 19, 2025; 7:00 p.m., ESPN+		at Boston University	L 66–68	10–16 (5–10)	Case Gym (893); Boston, MA
February 23, 2025; 12:00 p.m., ESPN+		Colgate	W 84–65	11–16 (6–10)	Reitz Arena (827); Baltimore, MD
February 26, 2025; 7:00 p.m., ESPN+		Bucknell	L 67–70	11–17 (6–11)	Reitz Arena (924); Baltimore, MD
March 1, 2024; 4:00 p.m., ESPN+		at Navy	L 68–81	11–18 (6–12)	Alumni Hall (2,019); Annapolis, MD
Patriot League tournament
March 4, 2025; 7:00 p.m., ESPN+	(8)	(9) Lehigh; First round	W 77–73	12–18	Reitz Arena (423); Baltimore, MD
March 6, 2025; 7:00 p.m., ESPN+	(8)	at (1) Bucknell; Quarterfinals	L 72–76 ^{OT}	12–19	Sojka Pavilion (2,898); Lewisburg, PA
*Non-conference game. ^{#}Rankings from AP poll. (#) Tournament seedings in parentheses. All times are in Eastern.
