= 2024–25 Holy Cross Crusaders men's basketball team =

American college basketball season

2024–25 Holy Cross Crusaders men's basketball
- Conference: Patriot League
- Record: 13–19 (5–13 Patriot)
- Head coach: Dave Paulsen (2nd season)
- Associate head coach: Bryson Johnson
- Assistant coaches: Ted Rawlings; Sydney Armand
- Home arena: Hart Center

2024–25 Patriot League men's basketball standings
	Conf.				Overall
Team	W		L	PCT	W		L	PCT
Bucknell	13	–	5	.722	18	–	15	.545
American †	13	–	5	.722	22	–	13	.629
Colgate	10	–	8	.556	14	–	19	.424
Boston University	10	–	8	.556	16	–	16	.500
Navy	10	–	8	.556	15	–	19	.441
Army	10	–	8	.556	17	–	16	.515
Lafayette	7	–	11	.389	13	–	20	.394
Loyola	6	–	12	.333	12	–	19	.387
Lehigh	6	–	12	.333	11	–	19	.367
Holy Cross	5	–	13	.278	13	–	19	.406
† 2025 Patriot League tournament winner

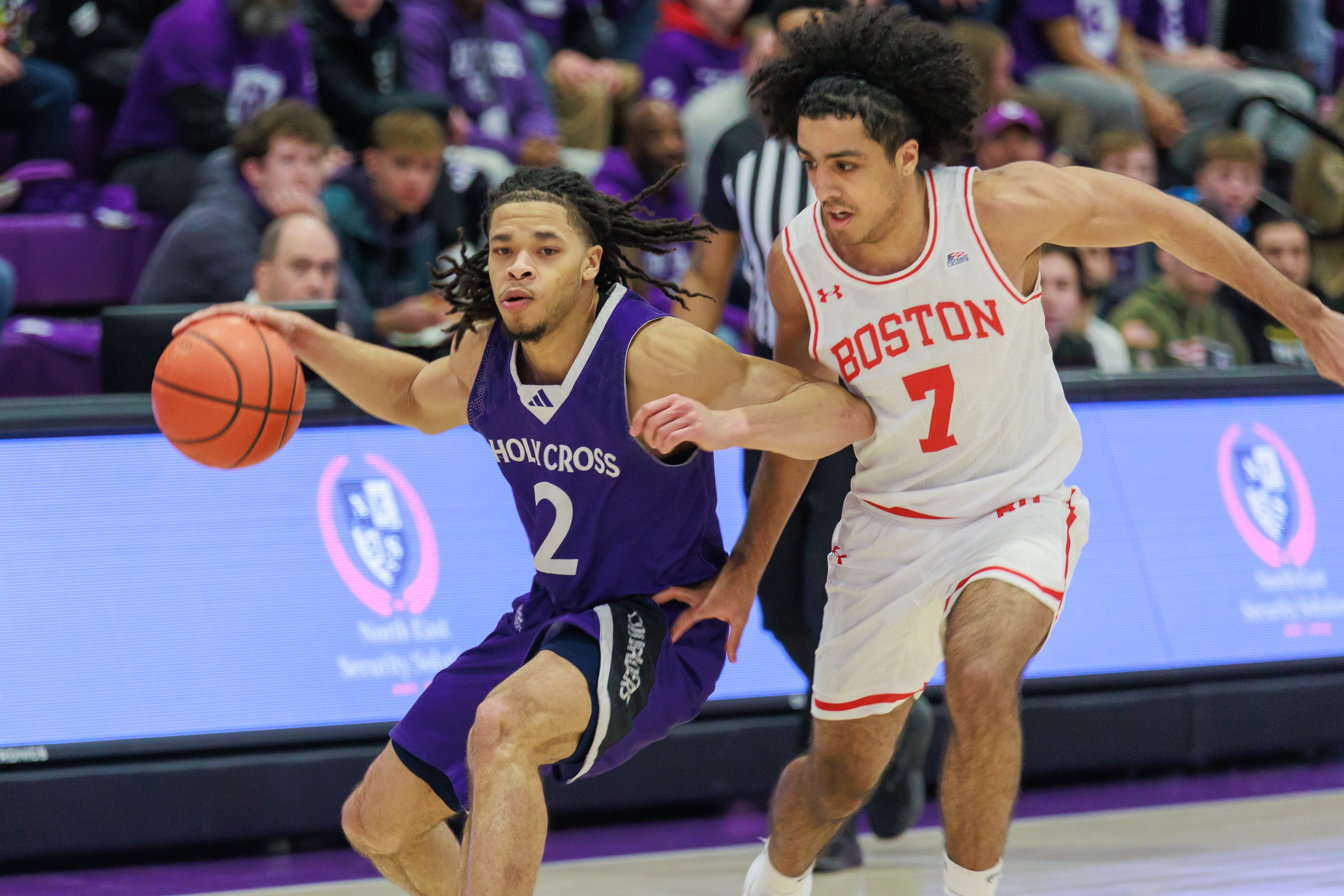
Sophomore guard DeAndre Williams scored 16 points against Boston University on February 8

The 2024–25 Holy Cross Crusaders men's basketball team represented the College of the Holy Cross during the 2024–25 NCAA Division I men's basketball season. The Crusaders, led by second-year head coach Dave Paulsen, played their home games at the Hart Center in Worcester, Massachusetts as members of the Patriot League.

== Previous season ==
The Crusaders finished the 2023–24 season 9–22, 6–12 in Patriot League play, to finish in a tie for eighth place. As the No. 9 seed in the Patriot League tournament, they defeated Army in the first round before falling to the eventual conference winner Colgate in the quarterfinals.

== Roster ==
2024–25 Holy Cross Crusaders men's basketball team
Players
Coaches

Pos.	#	Name	Height	Weight	Year	Previous school	Hometown
G	0	Tyler Boston	6 ft 0 in (1.83 m)	180 lb (82 kg)	Fr	Bullis School	Severn, MD
G	2	DeAndre Williams	6 ft 3 in (1.91 m)	180 lb (82 kg)	So	St. Benedict's Prep	Beacon, NY
G	3	Ben Capron	6 ft 0 in (1.83 m)	167 lb (76 kg)	Jr	Phillipsburg HS	Phillipsburg, NJ
G	4	Kahlil Singleton	6 ft 3 in (1.91 m)	191 lb (87 kg)	So	Scotland Campus	Vancouver, WA
G	5	Jaden Kirkwood	6 ft 5 in (1.96 m)	223 lb (101 kg)	Jr	IMG Academy	Ottawa, ON
G	10	Max Green	6 ft 6 in (1.98 m)	182 lb (83 kg)	Fr	Oldham County HS	La Grange, KY
G	12	Declan McIntyre	6 ft 2 in (1.88 m)	179 lb (81 kg)	So	Worcester Academy	White Plains, NY
G/F	21	Gabe Warren	6 ft 6 in (1.98 m)	219 lb (99 kg)	So	John Paul II HS	Plano, TX
F	22	Chuck Hare	6 ft 10 in (2.08 m)	224 lb (102 kg)	Fr	Kingswood Oxford School	Shelton, CT
F	23	Aidan Richard	6 ft 6 in (1.98 m)	200 lb (91 kg)	Fr	Ronald Reagan HS	San Antonio, TX
F	25	Jaiden Feroah	6 ft 8 in (2.03 m)	214 lb (97 kg)	Jr	Corner Canyon HS	Draper, UT
G/F	30	Joe Nugent	6 ft 6 in (1.98 m)	217 lb (98 kg)	So	Tabor Academy	Berkley, MA
F	33	Caleb Kenney	6 ft 6 in (1.98 m)	220 lb (100 kg)	Sr	Douglas Freeman HS	Richmond, VA
F	34	Declan Ryan	6 ft 8 in (2.03 m)	266 lb (121 kg)	So	Worcester Academy	Buffalo, NY

Head coach

- Dave Paulsen (Williams)

Assistant coach(es)

- Bryson Johnson (Bucknell)
- Ted Rawlings (Penn)
- Sydney Armand (Rhode Island)

Legend

- (C) Team captain
- (S) Suspended
- (I) Ineligible
- (W) Walk-on
- Injured
- Current redshirt

Roster
Last update: November 27, 2024

== Schedule and results ==
Date time, TV	Rank^{#}	Opponent^{#}	Result	Record	Site (attendance) city, state
Non-conference regular season
November 4, 2024*; 8:00 p.m., B1G+		at Wisconsin	L 61–85	0–1	Kohl Center (13,451); Madison, WI
November 8, 2024*; 7:00 p.m., ESPN+		at Rhode Island	L 77–91	0–2	Ryan Center (3,530); Kingston, RI
November 15, 2024*; 4:30 p.m., ESPN+		vs. Sacred Heart; College Hill Classic	W 82–75	1–2	Pizzitola Sports Center (259); Providence, RI
November 16, 2024*; 7:00 p.m., ESPN+		at Brown; College Hill Classic	W 73–65	2–2	Pizzitola Sports Center (802); Providence, RI
November 17, 2024*; 3:30 p.m., ESPN+		vs. New Hampshire; College Hill Classic	W 74–72	3–2	Pizzitola Sports Center (237); Providence, RI
November 19, 2023*; 12:00 p.m., ESPN+		Mitchell	W 88–49	4–2	Hart Center (861); Worcester, MA
November 24, 2024*; 12:00 p.m., ESPN+		at Maine	L 55–80	4–3	Memorial Gymnasium (1,235); Orono, ME
November 29, 2024*; 4:00 p.m., ACCN		at Virginia	L 41–67	4–4	John Paul Jones Arena (13,488); Charlottesville, VA
December 4, 2024*; 6:00 p.m., ESPN+		Harvard	W 68–67	5–4	Hart Center (1,033); Worcester, MA
December 7, 2024*; 2:00 p.m., ESPN+		Central Connecticut	L 56–69	5–5	Hart Center (1,002); Worcester, MA
December 17, 2024*; 7:00 p.m., ESPN+		at Quinnipiac	W 70–69	6–5	M&T Bank Arena (652); Hamden, CT
December 20, 2024*; 7:00 p.m., ESPN+		at Siena	W 78–70	7–5	MVP Arena (4,766); Albany, NY
December 29, 2024*; 2:00 p.m., ESPN+		Regis	W 82–46	8–5	Hart Center (1,046); Worcester, MA
Patriot League regular season
January 2, 2025; 6:00 p.m., ESPN+		Loyola (MD)	W 74–72	9–5 (1–0)	Hart Center (899); Worcester, MA
January 5, 2025; 2:00 p.m., ESPN+		at American	L 64–75	9–6 (1–1)	Bender Arena (820); Washington, D.C.
January 8, 2025; 6:00 p.m., ESPN+		Navy	W 70–59	10–6 (2–1)	Hart Center (874); Worcester, MA
January 11, 2025; 1:00 p.m., ESPN+		at Lafayette	L 65–82	10–7 (2–2)	Kirby Sports Center (1,276); Easton, PA
January 15, 2025; 7:00 p.m., ESPN+		at Bucknell	L 82–86	10–8 (2–3)	Sojka Pavilion (1,024); Lewisburg, PA
January 18, 2025; 1:00 p.m., ESPN+		American	L 65–74	10–9 (2–4)	Hart Center (1,221); Worcester, MA
January 22, 2025; 6:00 p.m., ESPN+		Army	L 71–76	10–10 (2–5)	Hart Center (1,104); Worcester, MA
January 25, 2025; 2:00 p.m., ESPN+		at Loyola (MD)	W 70–65	11–10 (3–5)	Reitz Arena (824); Baltimore, MD
January 27, 2025; 7:00 p.m., CBSSN		at Boston University; Turnpike Trophy	L 59–69	11–11 (3–6)	Case Gym (1,632); Boston, MA
February 1, 2025; 4:30 p.m., ESPN+		Lehigh	L 67–69	11–12 (3–7)	Hart Center (1,832); Worcester, MA
February 5, 2025; 6:00 p.m., ESPN+		at Army	L 65–68	11–13 (3–8)	Christl Arena (548); West Point, NY
February 8, 2025; 12:00 p.m., ESPN+		Boston University; Turnpike Trophy	W 72–52	12–13 (4–8)	Hart Center (2,517); Worcester, MA
February 12, 2025; 6:00 p.m., ESPN+		Colgate	L 65–87	12–14 (4–9)	Hart Center (1,088); Worcester, MA
February 15, 2025; 2:00 p.m., ESPN+		at Lehigh	L 60–72	12–15 (4–10)	Stabler Arena (743); Bethlehem, PA
February 19, 2025; 6:00 p.m., ESPN+		Lafayette	W 74–69 ^{OT}	13–15 (5–10)	Hart Center (1,454); Worcester, MA
February 23, 2025; 2:00 p.m., ESPN+		at Navy	L 77–83 ^{OT}	13–16 (5–11)	Alumni Hall (2,805); Annapolis, MD
February 26, 2025; 7:00 p.m., ESPN+		at Colgate	L 73–81	13–17 (5–12)	Cotterell Court (569); Hamilton, NY
March 1, 2025; 2:00 p.m., ESPN+		Bucknell	L 81–94	13–18 (5–13)	Hart Center (1,227); Worcester, MA
Patriot League tournament
March 4, 2025; 7:00 p.m., ESPN+	(10)	at (7) Lafayette; First round	L 68–69	13–19	Kirby Sports Center (1,565); Easton, PA
*Non-conference game. ^{#}Rankings from AP poll. (#) Tournament seedings in parentheses. All times are in Eastern.
