= 2024–25 Navy Midshipmen men's basketball team =

American college basketball season

2024–25 Navy Midshipmen men's basketball
- Conference: Patriot League
- Record: 15–19 (10–8 Patriot)
- Head coach: Ed DeChellis (14th season)
- Associate head coach: Emmett Davis; Jon Perry
- Assistant coaches: Jordan Lyons; Jaren Marino
- Home arena: Alumni Hall

2024–25 Patriot League men's basketball standings
	Conf.				Overall
Team	W		L	PCT	W		L	PCT
Bucknell	13	–	5	.722	18	–	15	.545
American †	13	–	5	.722	22	–	13	.629
Colgate	10	–	8	.556	14	–	19	.424
Boston University	10	–	8	.556	16	–	16	.500
Navy	10	–	8	.556	15	–	19	.441
Army	10	–	8	.556	17	–	16	.515
Lafayette	7	–	11	.389	13	–	20	.394
Loyola	6	–	12	.333	12	–	19	.387
Lehigh	6	–	12	.333	11	–	19	.367
Holy Cross	5	–	13	.278	13	–	19	.406
† 2025 Patriot League tournament winner

The 2024–25 Navy Midshipmen men's basketball team represented the United States Naval Academy in the 2024–25 NCAA Division I men's basketball season. The Midshipmen played their home games at Alumni Hall in Annapolis, Maryland as members of the Patriot League. It was the fourteenth and final campaign at Navy for head coach Ed DeChellis who announced his retirement on 19 March 2025.

== Previous season ==
The Midshipmen finished the 2023–24 season 13–18, 8–10 in Patriot League play to finish in seventh place. As the No. 7 seed in the Patriot League tournament, they defeated Loyola (MD) in the first round, before falling to Boston University in the quarterfinals.

== Roster ==
2024–25 Navy Midshipmen men's basketball team
Players
Coaches

Pos.	#	Name	Height	Weight	Year	Hometown
G	0	Nyles Howard	6 ft 2 in (1.88 m)	191 lb (87 kg)	So	Concord, NC
G	1	Austin Benigni	5 ft 10 in (1.78 m)	171 lb (78 kg)	Jr	The Woodlands, TX
G	2	Lysander Rehnstrom	6 ft 3 in (1.91 m)	193 lb (88 kg)	Sr	Reston, VA
G	3	Cam Cole	6 ft 1 in (1.85 m)	173 lb (78 kg)	So	Bristow, VA
F	5	Mitch Fischer	6 ft 7 in (2.01 m)	222 lb (101 kg)	Sr	Glen Arm, MD
G	7	Kam Summers	6 ft 2 in (1.88 m)	188 lb (85 kg)	Sr	Ocoee, FL
G	8	Sam Krist	6 ft 4 in (1.93 m)	190 lb (86 kg)	Jr	Rockford, MI
F	9	Reiss Whitaker	6 ft 6 in (1.98 m)	211 lb (96 kg)	So	Haymarket, VA
G	10	Jinwoo Kim	6 ft 1 in (1.85 m)	195 lb (88 kg)	So	Overland Park, KS
F	11	Donovan Draper	6 ft 4 in (1.93 m)	207 lb (94 kg)	Jr	West Palm Beach, FL
G	12	Grant Hopkins	5 ft 11 in (1.8 m)	186 lb (84 kg)	Jr	Alabaster, AL
G	14	Cam Cormany	5 ft 10 in (1.78 m)	183 lb (83 kg)	Jr	Radford, VA
G	15	Carnegie Johnson	5 ft 9 in (1.75 m)	175 lb (79 kg)	So	Greenwich, CT
G	16	Julien King	6 ft 1 in (1.85 m)	199 lb (90 kg)	Fr	Garner, NC
F	17	Jack Medalie	6 ft 5 in (1.96 m)	228 lb (103 kg)	So	Franklin, TN
G	18	Davyn de Jongh	6 ft 0 in (1.83 m)	170 lb (77 kg)	Fr	New York, NY
F	19	Sean Rose	6 ft 4 in (1.93 m)	182 lb (83 kg)	Fr	Monroe, NC
G	21	Jordan Pennick	5 ft 11 in (1.8 m)	195 lb (88 kg)	So	Reisterstown, MD
G	24	Julian Gabbidon	6 ft 2 in (1.88 m)	195 lb (88 kg)	So	Harrisburg, PA
G	25	David Burnett	6 ft 3 in (1.91 m)	200 lb (91 kg)	Fr	Flowery Branch, GA
F	26	Jackson Noble	6 ft 6 in (1.98 m)	221 lb (100 kg)	So	Greensboro, NC
F	30	Mike Woods	6 ft 3 in (1.91 m)	211 lb (96 kg)	Jr	Upper Marlboro, MD
F	33	Tobi Raji	6 ft 6 in (1.98 m)	214 lb (97 kg)	Fr	Greenbelt, MD
F	42	Cooper Jackson	6 ft 5 in (1.96 m)	228 lb (103 kg)	Fr	Winston-Salem, NC
F	77	Owen Gray	6 ft 8 in (2.03 m)	226 lb (103 kg)	Fr	Rockville, VA
C	99	Aidan Kehoe	6 ft 10 in (2.08 m)	246 lb (112 kg)	Jr	Montvale, NJ

Head coach

- Ed DeChellis (Penn State)

Assistant coach(es)

- Emmett Davis (St. Lawrence)
- Jon Perry (ETSU)
- Jordan Lyons (Furman)
- Jaren Marino (West Virginia Tech)

Legend

- (C) Team captain
- (S) Suspended
- (I) Ineligible
- (W) Walk-on
- Injured
- Current redshirt

Roster
Last update: November 9, 2024

== Schedule and results ==
Date time, TV	Rank^{#}	Opponent^{#}	Result	Record	Site (attendance) city, state
Non-conference regular season
November 4, 2024*; 7:00 pm, ESPN+		at Saint Joseph's	L 63–70	0–1	Hagan Arena (2,305); Philadelphia, PA
November 8, 2024*; 8:30 pm, CBSSN		Harvard; Veterans Classic	W 85–80	1–1	Alumni Hall (3,010); Annapolis, MD
November 12, 2024*; 7:00 pm, ESPN+		Rider	L 79–90	1–2	Alumni Hall (475); Annapolis, MD
November 17, 2024*; 1:00 pm, ESPN+		Campbell	L 66–86	1–3	Alumni Hall (902); Annapolis, MD
November 19, 2024*; 5:30 pm, ESPN+		Quinnipiac	L 63–74	1–4	Alumni Hall (642); Annapolis, MD
November 25, 2024*; 7:00 pm, ESPN+		Washington (MD)	W 94–43	2–4	Alumni Hall (605); Annapolis, MD
November 29, 2024*; 4:30 pm, ESPN+		at Penn; Cathedral of College Basketball Classic	W 86–78	3–4	The Palestra (1,649); Philadelphia, PA
November 30, 2024*; 2:00 pm, ESPN+		vs. Elon; Cathedral of College Basketball Classic	L 63–69	3–5	The Palestra (206); Philadelphia, PA
December 1, 2024*; 12:00 pm, ESPN+		vs. Maine; Cathedral of College Basketball Classic	L 66–71	3–6	The Palestra; Philadelphia, PA
December 7, 2024*; 2:00 pm, ESPN+		at NJIT	L 64–69	3–7	Wellness and Events Center (518); Newark, NJ
December 15, 2024*; 12:00 pm, ACCNX/ESPN+		at Virginia Tech	L 72–80	3–8	Cassell Coliseum (4,385); Blacksburg, VA
December 21, 2024*; 1:00 pm, ESPN+		at Coppin State	L 60–68	3–9	Physical Education Complex (347); Baltimore, MD
December 29, 2024*; 1:00 pm, FloHoops		at William & Mary	L 76–82	3–10	Kaplan Arena (3,077); Williamsburg, VA
Patriot League regular season
January 2, 2025; 7:00 pm, ESPN+		American	W 81–58	4–10 (1–0)	Alumni Hall (825); Annapolis, MD
January 5, 2025; 2:00 pm, ESPN+		Lafayette	W 71–70	5–10 (2–0)	Alumni Hall (1,564); Annapolis, MD
January 8, 2025; 6:00 pm, ESPN+		at Holy Cross	L 59–70	5–11 (2–1)	Hart Center (874); Worcester, MA
January 11, 2025; 5:00 pm, ESPN+		at Loyola (MD)	L 74–75	5–12 (2–2)	Reitz Arena (842); Baltimore, MD
January 15, 2025; 7:00 pm, ESPN+		Colgate	L 66–73	5–13 (2–3)	Alumni Hall (837); Annapolis, MD
January 18, 2025; 4:00 pm, ESPN+		at Bucknell	L 69–73	5–14 (2–4)	Sojka Pavilion (1,464); Lewisburg, PA
January 22, 2025; 7:00 pm, ESPN+		Boston University	W 62–47	6–14 (3–4)	Alumni Hall (904); Annapolis, MD
January 26, 2025; 3:30 pm, CBSSN		at Army; Rivalry	W 66–53	7–14 (4–4)	Christl Arena (4,607); West Point, NY
January 29, 2025; 7:00 pm, ESPN+		at Lehigh	W 79–54	8–14 (5–4)	Stabler Arena (796); Bethlehem, PA
February 1, 2025; 2:00 pm, ESPN+		Bucknell	L 75–85	8–15 (5–5)	Alumni Hall (2,007); Annapolis, MD
February 5, 2025; 7:00 pm, ESPN+		at Boston University	L 65–87	8–16 (5–6)	Case Gym (503); Boston, MA
February 8, 2025; 1:00 pm, ESPN+		at Lafayette	L 51–61	8–17 (5–7)	Kirby Sports Center (1,376); Easton, PA
February 12, 2025; 7:00 pm, ESPN+		Lehigh	W 63–60	9–17 (6–7)	Alumni Hall (892); Annapolis, MD
February 15, 2025; 1:30 pm, CBSSN		Army; Rivalry	W 61–54	10–17 (7–7)	Alumni Hall (5,298); Annapolis, MD
February 19, 2025; 7:00 pm, ESPN+		at Colgate	L 75–79	10–18 (7–8)	Cotterell Court (625); Hamilton, NY
February 23, 2025; 2:00 pm, ESPN+		Holy Cross	W 83–77 ^{OT}	11–18 (8–8)	Alumni Hall (2,805); Annapolis, MD
February 26, 2025; 7:00 pm, ESPN+		at American	W 68–60	12–18 (9–8)	Bender Arena (1,129); Washington, D.C.
March 1, 2025; 4:00 pm, ESPN+		Loyola (MD)	W 81–68	13–18 (10–8)	Alumni Hall (2,019); Annapolis, MD
Patriot League tournament
March 6, 2025; 7:00 pm, ESPN+	(5)	at (4) Boston University; Quarterfinals	W 86–78	14–18	Case Gym (530); Boston, MA
March 9, 2025; 12:00 pm, CBSSN	(5)	at (1) Bucknell; Semifinals	W 83–77	15–18	Sojka Pavilion (2,608); Lewisburg, PA
March 12, 2025; 7:00 pm, CBSSN	(5)	at (2) American; Championship	L 52–74	15–19	Bender Arena (2,578); Washington, D.C.
*Non-conference game. ^{#}Rankings from AP Poll. (#) Tournament seedings in parentheses. All times are in Eastern.
