= Duane Simpkins =

American basketball coach (born 1974)

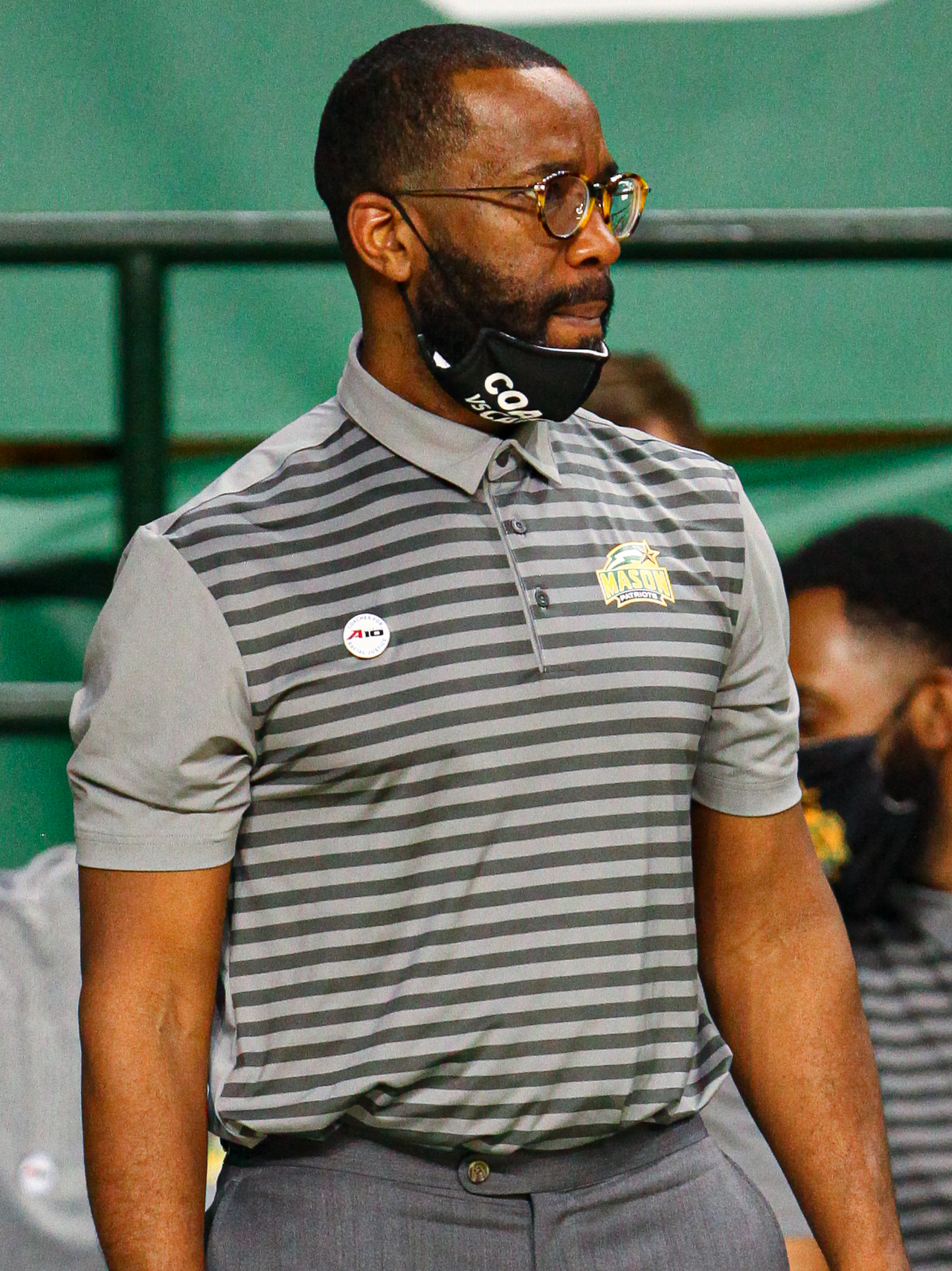
- Simpkins in 2021

Current position
- Title: Head coach
- Team: American
- Conference: Patriot League
- Record: 57–47 (.548)

Biographical details
- Born: April 9, 1974 (age 52)

Playing career
- 1992–1996: Maryland

Coaching career (HC unless noted)
- 1999–2000: Bishop O'Connell HS (assistant)
- 2005–2007: Sidwell Friends School
- 2007–2011: St. Albans School
- 2012–2015: UNC Greensboro (assistant)
- 2015–2023: George Mason (assistant)
- 2023–present: American

Administrative career (AD unless noted)
- 2011–2012: Towson (coordinator of basketball operations)

Head coaching record
- Overall: 57–47 (.548)
- Tournaments: 0–1 (NCAA)

Accomplishments and honors

Championships
- Patriot League regular season (2025); Patriot League tournament (2025)

Duane Simpkins (born April 9, 1974) is an American college basketball coach who serves as the head coach of the American Eagles men's basketball team.

== Playing career ==
Simpkins played high school basketball at DeMatha Catholic High School under Hall of Fame head coach Morgan Wootten and was a McDonald's High School All-American selection in 1992. He played his college basketball at Maryland under Gary Williams where he was a three-year starter and part of a trio of NCAA tournament appearances with the Terrapins.

Simpkins embarked on a professional career from 1997 to 2003, playing the USBL and ABA, as well as in various teams abroad including Olimpia Milano in Italy during the 2002–2003 season and Shandong in China in 2003.

== Coaching career ==
In between his playing career, Simpkins served as an assistant coach at Bishop O'Connell High School from 1999 to 2000. After his playing career, Simpkins was hired as the head boys' basketball coach at Sidwell Friends School in 2005, and served there before becoming the head coach of the boys basketball team at St. Albans School in 2007.

His first coaching opportunity in the college ranks came with Towson, where he was hired as the coordinator of basketball operations under Pat Skerry in 2011. After a single season with the Tigers, Simpkins became an assistant coach at UNC Greensboro where he worked under Wes Miller from 2012 to 2015. He'd return closer to the DMV area and join the staff at George Mason where he'd serve under both Dave Paulsen and Kim English from 2015 until 2023.

On April 1, 2023, Simpkins was hired to be the next head coach for the American Eagles.

== Head coaching record ==
=== College ===
Record table
| Season | Team | Overall | Conference | Standing | Postseason |
|---|---|---|---|---|---|
American Eagles (Patriot League) (2023–present)
| 2023–24 | American | 16–16 | 10–8 | T–2nd | |
| 2024–25 | American | 22–13 | 13–5 | T–1st | NCAA Division I First Four |
| 2025–26 | American | 16–16 | 9–9 | 5th | |
| 2026–27 | American | 3–2 | 0–0 | | |
| American Eagles: | | 57–47 (.548) | 32–22 (.593) | | |
| Total: | | 57–47 (.548) | | | |
National champion Postseason invitational champion Conference regular season champion Conference regular season and conference tournament champion Division regular season champion Division regular season and conference tournament champion Conference tournament champion
