= John Griffin III =

American college basketball coach

Bucknell Bison
- Position: Head coach
- League: Patriot League

Personal information
- Born: December 3, 1985 (age 40)

Career information
- High school: St. Joseph's Prep (Philadelphia, Pennsylvania)
- College: Bucknell (2004–2008)
- Playing career: 2008–2012
- Coaching career: 2010–present

Career history

Playing
- 2008–2009: Crailsheim Merlins
- 2010: BK Inter Bratislava
- 2011: Leicester Riders

Coaching
- 2010–2011: Indiana Pacers (Video Coordinator)
- 2012: Rider (DBO)
- 2013–2015: Rider (assistant)
- 2015–2019: Bucknell (assistant)
- 2019–2023: Saint Joseph's (associate HC)
- 2023–present: Bucknell

Career highlights
- As player: ProB champion (2009); ProB Most Valuable Player (2009); First-team All-Patriot League (2008); Patriot League All-Rookie Team (2005); As coach: Patriot League regular season champion (2025); Patriot League Coach of the Year (2025)

John Griffin III (born December 3, 1985) is an American college basketball coach and former player. Griffin is currently the head coach of the Bucknell Bison.

== Playing career ==
Griffin attended St. Joseph's Preparatory School in Philadelphia and led the basketball team to a Philadelphia Catholic League title as a senior in 2004.

In his first season as a professional in 2008–2009, Griffin played with the Crailsheim Merlins in the German second-tier ProB. He led the team to a league title and was named the league's most valuable player. After suffering an anterior cruciate ligament (ACL) injury, Griffin joined BK Inter Bratislava in Slovakia in early 2010. He signed with the Leicester Riders of the British Basketball League in late 2011. Griffin played one final season in Italy in 2011–2012.

== Coaching career ==
Griffin's first coaching position was with the Indiana Pacers as a Video Game Coordinator. He'd move to the college ranks to join the coaching staff at Rider first as the director of operations then as an assistant coach. From 2015 to 2019, he'd coach at his alma mater, Bucknell University, as an assistant, before joining Saint Joseph's as their associate head coach under Billy Lange.

On March 21, 2023, he was hired as the head coach at Bucknell replacing Nathan Davis.

== Personal life ==
Griffin's father, John Griffin, also coached college basketball, serving as head coach at Siena and Saint Joseph's. His brother, Matt, played at Rider and Boston University.

Griffin married Brianna Gauthier, who played college basketball at Mount St. Mary's.

== Head coaching record ==
Record table
Season	Team	Overall	Conference	Standing	Postseason
Bucknell Bison (Patriot League) (2023–present)
2023–24	Bucknell	14–19	10–8	T–2nd	
2024–25	Bucknell	18–15	13–5	T–1st	
2025–26	Bucknell	10–23	6–12	8th	
2026–27	Bucknell	1–5	0–0		
Bucknell:		43–71 (.377)	29–25 (.537)		
Total:		43–71 (.377)			
National champion Postseason invitational champion Conference regular season champion Conference regular season and conference tournament champion Division regular season champion Division regular season and conference tournament champion Conference tournament champion
