= Mike McGarvey =

American basketball coach (born 1982)

Current position
- Title: Head coach
- Team: Lafayette
- Conference: Patriot League
- Record: 39–68 (.364)

Biographical details
- Born: July 11, 1982 (age 44); Lower Gwynedd, Pennsylvania, U.S.

Playing career
- 2003–2006: Ursinus

Coaching career (HC unless noted)
- 2006–2011: Ursinus (assistant)
- 2011–2018: Colgate (assistant)
- 2018–2022: Lycoming
- 2022–2023: Lafayette (assistant)
- 2023: Lafayette (interim HC)
- 2023–present: Lafayette

Head coaching record
- Overall: 92–104 (.469)
- Tournaments: 0–1 (NCAA Division III)

Accomplishments and honors

Awards
- 2x Centennial Conference Player of the Year (2005, 2006)

Mike McGarvey (born July 11, 1982) is an American basketball coach who is the current head coach of the Lafayette Leopards men's basketball team.

== Playing career ==
McGarvey played college basketball at Ursinus he finished fourth on the school's all-time scoring list and was a two-time Centennial Conference Player of the Year in 2005 and 2006. He also was a NABC Division III All-American during the 2005–06 season. His No. 11 is retired by the school and he was inducted into the Ursinus Athletic Hall of Fame in 2016.

== Coaching career ==
After graduating, McGarvey joined his alma mater's coaching staff for five seasons, where he was part of Ursinus' 2008 NCAA Division III Final Four team. He'd then join the Division I ranks as an assistant to Matt Langel at Colgate in 2011 and would stay on staff until 2018 when he accepted the head coaching position at a Division III institution Lycoming. In his four seasons at the helm of the Warriors, McGarvey guided the team to a 53–36 overall record which included both MAC Commonwealth and MAC Freedom conference tournament titles, and a trip to the 2020 NCAA Tournament.

In 2022, McGarvey accepted the role as assistant coach under Mike Jordan at Lafayette. In February 2023, Jordan was placed on paid leave due to a complaint filed against him and McGarvey was named the interim head coach. During his time as an interim head coach, McGarvey guided the Leopards to a 2–3 record, which included two wins in the 2023 Patriot League conference tournament, as Lafayette reached the championship game before falling to Colgate 79–61.

On March 29, 2023, after the conclusion of investigation into the complaint, Jordan was fired. The interim tag was lifted and McGarvey became the permanent head coach at Lafayette.

== Head coaching record ==
=== NCAA DI ===
Record table
Season	Team	Overall	Conference	Standing	Postseason
Lafayette Leopards (Patriot League) (2022–present)
2022–23	Lafayette	2–3	0–2	6th	
2023–24	Lafayette	11–21	10–8	T–2nd	
2024–25	Lafayette	13–20	7–11	7th	
2025–26	Lafayette	11–21	8–10	T–6th	
2026–27	Lafayette	2–3	0–0		
Lafayette:		39–68 (.364)	25–31 (.446)		
Total:		39–68 (.364)			
National champion Postseason invitational champion Conference regular season champion Conference regular season and conference tournament champion Division regular season champion Division regular season and conference tournament champion Conference tournament champion

=== NCAA DIII ===
Record table
Season	Team	Overall	Conference	Standing	Postseason
Lycoming Warriors (Middle Atlantic Conferences) (2018–2022)
2018–19	Lycoming	11–14	5–11	8th (Commonwealth)	
2019–20	Lycoming	20–9	10–6	4th (Commonwealth)	NCAA Division III First Round
2020–21	Lycoming	5–2	4–2	2nd (Freedom)	
2021–22	Lycoming	17–11	10–6	5th (Freedom)	
Lycoming:		53–36 (.596)	29–25 (.537)		
Total:		53–36 (.596)			
National champion Postseason invitational champion Conference regular season champion Conference regular season and conference tournament champion Division regular season champion Division regular season and conference tournament champion Conference tournament champion
