= Army Black Knights men's basketball statistical leaders =

The Army Black Knights men's basketball statistical leaders are individual statistical leaders of the Army Black Knights men's basketball program in various categories, including points, rebounds, assists, steals, and blocks. Within those areas, the lists identify single-game, single-season, and career leaders. The Black Knights represent United States Military Academy in the NCAA's Patriot League.

Army began competing in intercollegiate basketball in 1902. However, the school's record book does not generally list records from before the 1950s, as records from before this period are often incomplete and inconsistent. Since scoring was much lower in this era, and teams played much fewer games during a typical season, it is likely that few or no players from this era would appear on these lists anyway.

The NCAA did not officially record assists as a stat until the 1983–84 season, and blocks and steals until the 1985–86 season, but Army's record books includes players in these stats before these seasons. These lists are updated through the end of the 2020–21 season.

== Scoring ==
Career
Rk	Player	Points	Seasons
1	Kevin Houston	2,325	1983–84 1984–85 1985–86 1986–87
2	Gary Winton	2,296	1974–75 1975–76 1976–77 1977–78
3	Mark Lueking	2,032	1992–93 1993–94 1994–95 1995–96
4	Kyle Wilson	2,001	2012–13 2013–14 2014–15 2015–16
5	Randy Cozzens	1,906	1981–82 1982–83 1983–84 1984–85
6	Jalen Rucker	1,877	2020–21 2021–22 2022–23 2024–25
7	Matt Wilson	1,587	2016–17 2017–18 2018–19 2019–20
8	Ella Ellis	1,585	2009–10 2010–11 2011–12 2012–13
9	Tommy Funk	1,544	2016–17 2017–18 2018–19 2019–20
10	Chris Spatola	1,543	1998–99 1999–00 2000–01 2001–02

Season
Rk	Player	Points	Season
1	Kevin Houston	953	1986–87
2	Mark Lueking	682	1994–95
	Randy Cozzens	682	1984–85
4	Gary Winton	644	1977–78
5	Gary Winton	630	1976–77
6	Kevin Houston	600	1985–86
7	Darryle Kouns	587	1957–58
	Jalen Rucker	587	2024–25
9	Mark Lueking	577	1993–94
10	Kyle Wilson	570	2013–14

Single game
Rk	Player	Points	Season	Opponent
1	Kevin Houston	53	1986–87	Fordham
2	Mark Binstein	50	1955–56	Rhode Island
3	Kevin Houston	46	1986–87	Manhattanville
4	Kevin Houston	44	1986–87	St. Peter’s
	Bill Hannon	44	1953–54	New Mexico
6	Darryle Kouns	43	1957–58	Albright
	Mark Lueking	43	1994–95	Bucknell
	Chris Spatola	43	2000–01	Lafayette
9	Kevin Houston	42	1986–87	Fordham
	Kevin Houston	42	1986–87	Seton Hall

== Rebounds ==
Career
Rk	Player	Rebounds	Seasons
1	Gary Winton	1,168	1974–75 1975–76 1976–77 1977–78
2	Bill Hannon	1,101	1951–52 1952–53 1953–54
3	Matt Wilson	852	2016–17 2017–18 2018–19 2019–20
4	David Ardayfio	788	1990–91 1991–92 1992–93 1993–94
5	Mike Silliman	784	1963–64 1964–65 1965–66
6	Lee Sager	761	1958–59 1959–60 1960–61
7	Kevin Ferguson	728	2012–13 2013–14 2014–15 2015–16
8	Todd Mattson	700	1986–87 1987–88 1988–89 1989–90
9	Jason Wands	638	1993–94 1994–95 1995–96 1996–97
10	George Tatum	599	1995–96 1996–97 1997–98 1998–99

Season
Rk	Player	Rebounds	Season
1	Bill Hannon	381	1953–54
2	Bill Hannon	365	1952–53
3	Bill Hannon	355	1951–52
4	Mike Silliman	325	1964–65
5	Mike Silliman	320	1963–64
6	Gary Winton	315	1974–75
7	Gary Winton	297	1976–77
8	Gary Winton	289	1977–78
9	Lee Sager	288	1958–59
10	Kevin Ferguson	282	2015–16

Single game
Rk	Player	Rebounds	Season	Opponent
1	Bill Hannon	27	1953–54	Pittsburgh
2	Todd Mattson	24	1989–90	Holy Cross
3	Chris Glowe	21	1994–95	Lafayette
	Gary Winton	21	1974–75	Upsala
5	Gary Winton	20	1974–75	Penn State
6	Kevin Ferguson	19	2015–16	Navy
	Gary Winton	19	1974–75	Manhattan
	Gary Winton	19	1974–75	Syracuse
9	David Ardayfio	18	1993–94	Lafayette
	Gary Winton	18	1975–76	Seton Hall

== Assists ==
Career
Rk	Player	Assists	Seasons
1	Tommy Funk	728	2016–17 2017–18 2018–19 2019–20
2	Dylan Cox	479	2012–13 2013–14 2014–15 2015–16
3	Jordan Fox	437	2015–16 2016–17 2017–18 2018–19
4	Randy Cozzens	430	1981–82 1982–83 1983–84 1984–85
5	Ron Wilson	422	1986–87 1987–88 1988–89 1989–90
6	Kevin Houston	379	1983–84 1984–85 1985–86 1986–87
7	Jalen Rucker	375	2020–21 2021–22 2022–23 2024–25
8	Ryan Curry	356	2023–24 2024–25 2025–26
9	Josh Miller	336	2006–07 2007–08 2008–09 2009–10
10	Alex Morris	335	1992–93 1993–94 1994–95 1995–96 1996–97

Season
Rk	Player	Assists	Season
1	Tommy Funk	212	2019–20
2	Tommy Funk	178	2018–19
3	Tommy Funk	172	2017–18
4	Ron Wilson	162	1988–89
5	Tommy Funk	155	2016–17
6	Dylan Cox	147	2015–16
7	Jordan Fox	146	2016–17
8	Dylan Cox	144	2014–15
9	Ryan Curry	140	2025–26
10	J.P. Spatola	136	2001–02

Single game
Rk	Player	Assists	Season	Opponent
1	Ron Wilson	15	1987–88	Holy Cross
2	J.P. Spatola	14	2001–02	New Hampshire
3	Ron Wilson	13	1988–89	Manhattan
	Tommy Funk	13	2019–20	Fairleigh Dickinson
5	Tommy Funk	12	2016–17	Holy Cross
	Tommy Funk	12	2019–20	American
	Tommy Funk	12	2019–20	Lafayette
8	Tommy Funk	11	2016–17	American
	Dylan Cox	11	2015–16	George Washington
	Dylan Cox	11	2015–16	Fairleigh Dickinson
	Josh Miller	11	2007–08	Brown
	J.P. Spatola	11	2001–02	Coast Guard
	Alex Morris	11	1994–95	Lehigh
	Ron Wilson	11	1988–89	Fordham
	Tommy Funk	11	2019–20	Loyola (MD)
	Tommy Funk	11	2019–20	Lafayette

== Steals ==
Career
Rk	Player	Steals	Seasons
1	Josh Caldwell	168	2018–19 2019–20 2020–21 2021–22
2	Cleveland Richard	149	2006–07 2007–08 2008–09 2009–10
3	Josh Miller	148	2006–07 2007–08 2008–09 2009–10
4	Marcus Nelson	145	2006–07 2007–08 2008–09 2009–10
5	George Tatum	143	1995–96 1996–97 1997–98 1998–99
6	Kevin Houston	126	1983–84 1984–85 1985–86 1986–87
7	Jalen Rucker	122	2020–21 2021–22 2022–23 2024–25
8	Kevin Berry	117	1987–88 1988–89 1989–90 1990–91
9	Tommy Funk	102	2016–17 2017–18 2018–19 2019–20
10	Dylan Cox	98	2012–13 2013–14 2014–15 2015–16

Season
Rk	Player	Steals	Season
1	Josh Caldwell	67	2021–22
2	Tanner Omlid	63	2013–14
3	Josh Miller	55	2007–08
4	Randy Cozzens	52	1984–85
	Jalen Rucker	52	2024–25
6	Cleveland Richard	50	2009–10
	Kevin Houston	50	1986–87
	Cleveland Richard	50	2008–09
9	Jarell Brown	48	2007–08
	Craig Rose	48	1991–92
	Derrick Canada	48	1988–89

Single game
Rk	Player	Steals	Season	Opponent
1	Cleveland Richard	8	2009–10	Princeton
2	Craig Rose	7	1991–92	The Citadel
3	Travis Owsley	6	2003–04	SUNY Maritime
	Kevin Houston	6	1985–86	St. Francis (N.Y.)
	Adam Glosier	6	1999–00	Navy
	Tanner Omlid	6	2013–14	Lafayette
	Tanner Omlid	6	2013–14	Bucknell
	Josh Caldwell	6	2021–22	Navy
	Jalen Rucker	6	2024–25	Le Moyne

== Blocks ==
Career
Rk	Player	Blocks	Seasons
1	Kevin Ferguson	205	2012–13 2013–14 2014–15 2015–16
2	Marcus Nelson	74	2006–07 2007–08 2008–09 2009–10
	Jimmy Sewell	74	2003–04 2004–05 2005–06 2006–07
4	Josh Scovens	73	2023–24 2024–25
5	Charles Woodruff	64	1998–99 1999–00 2000–01 2001–02
6	Seth Barrett	56	1997–98 1998–99 1999–00 2000–01
7	Chris Walker	54	2006–07 2007–08 2008–09 2009–10
	Abe Johnson	54	2021–22 2022–23 2023–24
9	Alex King	49	2017–18 2018–19 2019–20 2020–21
10	Ella Ellis	45	2009–10 2010–11 2011–12 2012–13

Season
Rk	Player	Blocks	Season
1	Kevin Ferguson	78	2013–14
2	Kevin Ferguson	47	2015–16
3	Kevin Ferguson	45	2014–15
4	Josh Scovens	37	2024–25
5	Josh Scovens	36	2023–24
6	Kevin Ferguson	35	2012–13
7	Marcus Nelson	32	2008–09
8	Abe Johnson	31	2023–24
9	Jimmy Sewell	29	2004–05
10	Charles Woodruff	22	2001–02
	Chris Glowe	22	1996–97

Single game
Rk	Player	Steals	Season	Opponent
1	Josh Scovens	6	2024–25	American University
	Kevin Ferguson	6	2015–16	Maine
	Kevin Ferguson	6	2013–14	Boston University
	Kevin Ferguson	6	2013–14	Lehigh
	Kevin Ferguson	6	2013–14	Boston University
6	Abe Johnson	5	2023–24	American
	Kevin Ferguson	5	2014–15	Maine
	Kevin Ferguson	5	2013–14	Loyola
	Kevin Ferguson	5	2013–14	Bucknell
	Kevin Ferguson	5	2012–13	American
	Marcus Nelson	5	2008–09	Quinnipiac
