= 2024–25 Army Black Knights men's basketball team =

American college basketball season

2024–25 Army Black Knights men's basketball

CBI, Quarterfinals
- Conference: Patriot League
- Record: 17–16 (10–8 Patriot)
- Head coach: Kevin Kuwik (2nd season)
- Assistant coaches: Jarren Dyson; Andy Fox; Bryan Joel; Damani Myers; Nick Thorsen
- Home arena: Christl Arena

2024–25 Patriot League men's basketball standings
	Conf.				Overall
Team	W		L	PCT	W		L	PCT
Bucknell	13	–	5	.722	18	–	15	.545
American †	13	–	5	.722	22	–	13	.629
Colgate	10	–	8	.556	14	–	19	.424
Boston University	10	–	8	.556	16	–	16	.500
Navy	10	–	8	.556	15	–	19	.441
Army	10	–	8	.556	17	–	16	.515
Lafayette	7	–	11	.389	13	–	20	.394
Loyola	6	–	12	.333	12	–	19	.387
Lehigh	6	–	12	.333	11	–	19	.367
Holy Cross	5	–	13	.278	13	–	19	.406
† 2025 Patriot League tournament winner

The 2024–25 Army Black Knights men's basketball team represented the United States Military Academy in the 2024–25 NCAA Division I men's basketball season. The Black Knights, led by second-year head coach Kevin Kuwik, played their home games at Christl Arena in West Point, New York as members of the Patriot League.

== Previous season ==
The Black Knights finished the 2023–24 season 10–22, 6–12 in Patriot League play to tie for eighth place. As the No. 8 seed in the Patriot League tournament, they were defeated by Holy Cross in the first round.

== Roster ==
2024–25 Army Black Knights men's basketball team
Players
Coaches

Pos.	#	Name	Height	Weight	Year	Previous school	Hometown
G	0	Isaiah Caldwell	6 ft 4 in (1.93 m)	165 lb (75 kg)	Sr	USMAPS	Columbia, SC
G	1	Jalen Rucker	5 ft 10 in (1.78 m)	180 lb (82 kg)	Sr	Gilman (USMAPS)	Baltimore, MD
G	2	Ryan Curry	6 ft 0 in (1.83 m)	180 lb (82 kg)	So	Montgomery HS (USMAPS)	Montgomery, NJ
F	4	Josh Scovens	6 ft 6 in (1.98 m)	220 lb (100 kg)	So	Page HS (USMAPS)	Greensboro, NC
F	5	Griff Lamb	6 ft 8 in (2.03 m)	217 lb (98 kg)	Sr	Gilbert HS (USMAPS)	Holbrook, AZ
F	10	Jacen Holloway	6 ft 4 in (1.93 m)	225 lb (102 kg)	Fr	Devon Prep (USMAPS)	Philadelphia, PA
G	12	Blane St. Clair	6 ft 5 in (1.96 m)	215 lb (98 kg)	Sr	Davidson Day School	Boone, NC
G	13	Kendall Hailey	6 ft 3 in (1.91 m)	180 lb (82 kg)	So	Notre Dame HS (USMAPS)	Los Angeles, CA
F	14	Joshua Eli	6 ft 6 in (1.98 m)	210 lb (95 kg)	Fr	Paul VI HS (USMAPS)	Woodbury, NJ
F	15	Jorn Everson	6 ft 8 in (2.03 m)	205 lb (93 kg)	Jr	Northfield Mount Hermon	Williston, ND
G	21	Jackson Mayo	6 ft 0 in (1.83 m)	185 lb (84 kg)	Jr	Mililani HS	Mililani, HI
G	22	Kevin McCarthy	6 ft 4 in (1.93 m)	185 lb (84 kg)	Fr	Episcopal Academy	West Chester, PA
G	23	Brendon O'Keefe	5 ft 10 in (1.78 m)	180 lb (82 kg)	Fr	Regis HS	New Rochelle, NY
G	24	Alex Engro	6 ft 2 in (1.88 m)	190 lb (86 kg)	Fr	Loyola Academy	Glenview, IL
F	25	Chanse Perkins	6 ft 4 in (1.93 m)	220 lb (100 kg)	Jr	Woodlands Christian Academy	Houston, TX
G	30	Dayon Polk	6 ft 0 in (1.83 m)	175 lb (79 kg)	Fr	Sanford School (USMAPS)	Wilmington, DE
G	31	Blake Barker	6 ft 2 in (1.88 m)	200 lb (91 kg)	Sr	Columbus North HS	Columbus, IN
F	32	Tate Laczkowski	6 ft 8 in (2.03 m)	205 lb (93 kg)	So	Wilbraham & Monson Academy	Dallas, TX
F	33	JT Dougherty	6 ft 9 in (2.06 m)	220 lb (100 kg)	Sr	River Falls HS	River Falls, WI
G	34	Jaxson Bell	6 ft 3 in (1.91 m)	210 lb (95 kg)	Fr	North Central HS	Indianapolis, IN
G	42	Luke Benson	5 ft 11 in (1.8 m)	185 lb (84 kg)	Sr	Marist School	Atlanta, GA
F	44	Dylan Murans	6 ft 7 in (2.01 m)	190 lb (86 kg)	Fr	Guerin Catholic HS	Carmel, IN
F	54	Nnaemeka Ikechi	6 ft 7 in (2.01 m)	230 lb (104 kg)	Fr	De La Salle Collegiate HS	Warren, MI
F	55	AJ Allenspach	6 ft 8 in (2.03 m)	225 lb (102 kg)	Sr	Lake Norman Christian School	Simpsonville, SC

Head coach

- Kevin Kuwik (Notre Dame)

Assistant coach(es)

- Jarren Dyson (Emory & Henry)
- Andy Fox (Cornell (IA))
- Bryan Joel (Caltech)
- Damani Myers (Delaware Valley)
- Nick Thorsen (Penn State Behrend)

Legend

- (C) Team captain
- (S) Suspended
- (I) Ineligible
- (W) Walk-on
- Injured
- Current redshirt

Roster
Last update: November 12, 2024

== Schedule and results ==
Date time, TV	Rank^{#}	Opponent^{#}	Result	Record	Site (attendance) city, state
Non-conference regular season
November 4, 2024*; 8:00 pm, ESPN+		Albany	W 67–59	1–0	Christl Arena (350); West Point, NY
November 8, 2024*; 6:00 pm, ACCN		at No. 7 Duke	L 58–100	1–1	Cameron Indoor Stadium (9,314); Durham, NC
November 12, 2024*; 11:00 am, ESPN+		Mount Saint Mary (NY)	W 101–48	2–1	Christl Arena (589); West Point, NY
November 15, 2024*; 7:00 pm, ESPN+		at Marist	L 88–91 ^{OT}	2–2	McCann Arena (2,249); Poughkeepsie, NY
November 20, 2024*; 7:00 pm, ESPN+		Fairleigh Dickinson; Metro NY/NJ Classic	W 84–70	3–2	Christl Arena (750); West Point, NY
November 22, 2024*; 7:00 pm, ESPN+		at Manhattan; Metro NY/NJ Classic	L 79–80	3–3	Draddy Gymnasium (1,106); Riverdale, NY
November 26, 2024*; 7:00 pm, ESPN+		SUNY Maritime	W 91–52	4–3	Christl Arena (623); West Point, NY
December 3, 2024*; 7:00 pm, NEC Front Row		at Le Moyne	W 103–100 ^{3OT}	5–3	Ted Grant Court (803); DeWitt, NY
December 8, 2024*; 1:00 pm, ESPN+		Cornell	L 84–103	5–4	Christl Arena (300); West Point, NY
December 13, 2024*; 7:00 pm, ESPN+		at George Washington	L 60–75	5–5	Charles E. Smith Center (2,049); Washington, D.C.
December 22, 2024*; 1:00 pm, ESPN+		Binghamton	L 68–78	5–6	Christl Arena (455); West Point, NY
December 29, 2024*; 3:00 pm, ESPN+		UTSA	W 78–75	6–6	Christl Arena (1,102); West Point, NY
Patriot League regular season
January 2, 2025; 7:00 pm, ESPN+		at Colgate	L 59–71	6–7 (0–1)	Cotterell Court (702); Hamilton, NY
January 5, 2025; 1:00 pm, ESPN+		at Boston University	L 63–71	6–8 (0–2)	Case Gym (1,073); Boston, MA
January 8, 2025; 6:00 pm, ESPN+		Loyola (MD)	W 74–72	7–8 (1–2)	Christl Arena (570); West Point, NY
January 11, 2025; 2:00 pm, ESPN+		at Lehigh	W 74–69	8–8 (2–2)	Stabler Arena (891); Bethlehem, PA
January 15, 2025; 6:00 pm, ESPN+		Lafayette	W 70–68	9–8 (3–2)	Christl Arena (543); West Point, NY
January 18, 2025; 12:00 pm, ESPN+		Boston University	W 68–62	10–8 (4–2)	Christl Arena (1,168); West Point, NY
January 22, 2025; 6:00 pm, ESPN+		at Holy Cross	W 76–71	11–8 (5–2)	Hart Center (1,104); Worcester, MA
January 26, 2025; 3:30 pm, CBSSN		Navy	L 53–66	11–9 (5–3)	Christl Arena (4,607); West Point, NY
January 29, 2025; 6:00 pm, ESPN+		Colgate	W 84–72	12–9 (6–3)	Christl Arena (645); West Point, NY
February 1, 2025; 2:00 pm, ESPN+		at American	L 68–71	12–10 (6–4)	Bender Arena (1,707); Washington, D.C.
February 5, 2025; 6:00 pm, ESPN+		Holy Cross	W 68–65	13–10 (7–4)	Christl Arena (548); West Point, NY
February 8, 2025; 1:00 pm, ESPN+		Bucknell	W 116–110 ^{2OT}	14–10 (8–4)	Christl Arena (868); West Point, NY
February 12, 2025; 7:00 pm, ESPN+		at Loyola (MD)	W 64–60	15–10 (9–4)	Reitz Arena (914); Baltimore, MD
February 15, 2025; 1:30 pm, CBSSN		at Navy	L 54–61	15–11 (9–5)	Alumni Hall (5,298); Annapolis, MD
February 19, 2025; 6:00 pm, ESPN+		American	W 76–69	16–11 (10–5)	Christl Arena (695); West Point, NY
February 23, 2025; 2:00 pm, CBSSN		at Bucknell	L 53–84	16–12 (10–6)	Sojka Pavilion (2,914); Lewisburg, PA
February 25, 2025; 7:00 pm, ESPN+		at Lafayette	L 65–81	16–13 (10–7)	Kirby Sports Center (1,364); Easton, PA
March 1, 2025; 1:00 pm, ESPN+		Lehigh	L 67–89	16–14 (10–8)	Christl Arena (917); West Point, NY
Patriot League tournament
March 4, 2025; 7:00 pm, ESPN+	(6)	at (3) Colgate; Quarterfinals	L 55–84	16–15	Cotterell Court (1,193); Hamilton, NY
CBI
March 23, 2025; 2:00 pm, FloSports		vs. Elon; First round	W 83–78	17–15	Ocean Center; Daytona Beach, FL
March 24, 2025; 2:00 pm, FloSports		vs. Florida Gulf Coast; Quarterfinals	L 65–68	17–16	Ocean Center (832); Daytona Beach, FL
*Non-conference game. ^{#}Rankings from AP Poll. (#) Tournament seedings in parentheses. All times are in Eastern.
