= 2023–24 Navy Midshipmen men's basketball team =

American college basketball season

2023–24 Navy Midshipmen men's basketball
- Conference: Patriot League
- Record: 13–18 (8–10 Patriot)
- Head coach: Ed DeChellis (13th season)
- Associate head coach: Emmett Davis; Jon Perry
- Assistant coaches: Jordan Lyons; Jaren Marino
- Home arena: Alumni Hall

2023–24 Patriot League men's basketball standings
	Conf.				Overall
Team	W		L	PCT	W		L	PCT
Colgate †	16	–	2	.889	25	–	10	.714
Boston University	10	–	8	.556	16	–	17	.485
Lafayette	10	–	8	.556	11	–	21	.344
American	10	–	8	.556	16	–	16	.500
Bucknell	10	–	8	.556	14	–	19	.424
Lehigh	9	–	9	.500	14	–	18	.438
Navy	8	–	10	.444	13	–	18	.419
Army	6	–	12	.333	10	–	22	.313
Holy Cross	6	–	12	.333	10	–	23	.303
Loyola	5	–	13	.278	7	–	25	.219
† 2024 Patriot League tournament winner

The 2023–24 Navy Midshipmen men's basketball team represented the United States Naval Academy in the 2023–24 NCAA Division I men's basketball season. The Midshipmen, led by 13th-year head coach Ed DeChellis, played their home games at Alumni Hall in Annapolis, Maryland as members of the Patriot League.

== Previous season ==
The Midshipmen finished the 2022–23 season 18–12, 11–7 in Patriot League play, to tie for second place. As the No. 2 seed in the Patriot League tournament, they were upset in the quarterfinal round by No. 7 seed American.

== Roster ==
2023–24 Navy Midshipmen men's basketball team
Players
Coaches

Pos.	#	Name	Height	Weight	Year	Previous school	Hometown
G	0	Austin Inge	6 ft 0 in (1.83 m)	190 lb (86 kg)	Sr	Greensboro Day School	Greensboro, NC
G	1	Austin Benigni	5 ft 10 in (1.78 m)	170 lb (77 kg)	So	The Woodlands Christian Academy	The Woodlands, TX
G	2	Lysander Rehnstrom	6 ft 3 in (1.91 m)	195 lb (88 kg)	Jr	Herndon High School	Reston, VA
G	3	Cam Cole	6 ft 1 in (1.85 m)	165 lb (75 kg)	Fr	The Highland School	Bristow, VA
G	6	Jalen White	6 ft 3 in (1.91 m)	203 lb (92 kg)	So	Mount Saint Joseph High School	Severn, MD
G	7	Kam Summers	6 ft 4 in (1.93 m)	191 lb (87 kg)	Jr	First Academy	Ocoee, FL
G	8	Sam Krist	6 ft 4 in (1.93 m)	194 lb (88 kg)	So	Rockford High School	Rockford, MI
F	9	Reiss Whitaker	6 ft 6 in (1.98 m)	215 lb (98 kg)	Fr	The Highland School	Haymarket, VA
G	10	Jinwoo Kim	6 ft 3 in (1.91 m)	195 lb (88 kg)	Fr	Blue Valley Southwest High School	Overland Park, KS
F	11	Donovan Draper	6 ft 5 in (1.96 m)	203 lb (92 kg)	So	Forest Hill Community High School	West Palm Beach, FL
G	12	Grant Hopkins	6 ft 1 in (1.85 m)	183 lb (83 kg)	So	Thompson High School	Alabaster, AL
G	14	Cam Cormany	6 ft 0 in (1.83 m)	180 lb (82 kg)	So	Radford High School	Radford, VA
G	15	Carnegie Johnson	5 ft 11 in (1.8 m)	175 lb (79 kg)	Fr	Blair Academy	Greenwich, CT
G	17	Jack Medalie	6 ft 6 in (1.98 m)	224 lb (102 kg)	Fr	Franklin High School	Franklin, TN
F	20	Boston Bonifay	6 ft 7 in (2.01 m)	225 lb (102 kg)	Fr	Cathedral Catholic High School	San Diego, CA
G	21	Jordan Pennick	5 ft 11 in (1.8 m)	190 lb (86 kg)	Fr	Archbishop Spalding High School	Reisterstown, MD
G	22	Mac MacDonald	6 ft 1 in (1.85 m)	181 lb (82 kg)	Jr	Collegiate School	Richmond, VA
G	23	Chandler Schmidt	6 ft 0 in (1.83 m)	190 lb (86 kg)	Fr	Cabell Midland High School	Milton, WV
G	24	Julian Gabbidon	6 ft 3 in (1.91 m)	180 lb (82 kg)	Fr	Trinity High School	Harrisburg, PA
G	25	Nyles Howard	6 ft 3 in (1.91 m)	183 lb (83 kg)	Fr	Carmel Christian School	Concord, NC
F	26	Jackson Noble	6 ft 7 in (2.01 m)	220 lb (100 kg)	Fr	Greensboro Day School	Greensboro, NC
F	30	Mike Woods	6 ft 4 in (1.93 m)	204 lb (93 kg)	So	Douglass High School	Upper Marlboro, MD
F	42	Tony Atkinson	6 ft 8 in (2.03 m)	230 lb (104 kg)	Sr	Westminster Academy	Palm Beach Gardens, FL
C	54	Ethan DeLaurier	6 ft 9 in (2.06 m)	225 lb (102 kg)	Fr	Miller School of Albemarle	Shipman, VA
C	99	Aidan Kehoe	6 ft 10 in (2.08 m)	235 lb (107 kg)	So	Pascack Hills High School	Montvale, NJ

Head coach

- Ed DeChellis (Penn State)

Assistant coach(es)

- Emmett Davis (St. Lawrence)
- Jon Perry (ETSU)
- Jordan Lyons (Furman)
- Jaren Marino (West Virginia Tech)

Legend

- (C) Team captain
- (S) Suspended
- (I) Ineligible
- (W) Walk-on
- Injured
- Current redshirt

Roster
Last update: November 29, 2023

== Schedule and results ==
Date time, TV	Rank^{#}	Opponent^{#}	Result	Record	Site (attendance) city, state
Non-conference regular season
November 6, 2023*; 8:00 p.m., FloHoops		at Campbell	L 48–59	0–1	Gore Arena (1,357); Buies Creek, NC
November 10, 2023*; 8:30 p.m., CBSSN		Temple; Veterans Classic	L 68–75	0–2	Alumni Hall (2,340); Annapolis, MD
November 18, 2023*; 7:00 p.m., ESPN+		at UC San Diego	L 55–73	0–3	LionTree Arena (1,366); La Jolla, CA
November 20, 2023*; 10:00 p.m., ESPN+		at San Diego	L 59–67	0–4	Jenny Craig Pavilion (622); San Diego, CA
November 29, 2023*; 7:00 p.m., ESPN+		VMI	W 67–47	1–4	Alumni Hall (657); Annapolis, MD
December 3, 2023*; 1:30 p.m., ESPN+		Coppin State	W 75–52	2–4	Alumni Hall (950); Annapolis, MD
December 5, 2023*; 7:00 p.m., ESPN+/Monumental		at George Washington	L 77–79 ^{OT}	2–5	Charles E. Smith Center (1,869); Washington, D.C.
December 8, 2023*; 7:00 p.m., ESPN+/ESPN3		at Quinnipiac	L 68–71	2–6	M&T Bank Arena (1,221); Hamden, CT
December 17, 2023*; 1:00 p.m., ESPN+		Washington (MD)	W 91–33	3–6	Alumni Hall (1,115); Annapolis, MD
December 21, 2023*; 2:00 p.m., ESPN+		at Youngstown State	L 65–75	3–7	Beeghly Center (2,463); Youngstown, OH
December 30, 2023*; 12:00 p.m., ESPN+		William & Mary	W 77–65	4–7	Alumni Hall (1,597); Annapolis, MD
Patriot League regular season
January 3, 2024; 7:00 p.m., ESPN+		Boston University	W 62–60	5–7 (1–0)	Alumni Hall (1,007); Annapolis, MD
January 6, 2024; 1:00 p.m., ESPN+		Colgate	L 72–80	5–8 (1–1)	Alumni Hall (1,457); Annapolis, MD
January 10, 2024; 7:00 p.m., ESPN+		at Holy Cross	W 80–70	6–8 (2–1)	Hart Center (646); Worcester, MA
January 13, 2024; 2:00 p.m., ESPN+		at Lafayette	L 62–78	6–9 (2–2)	Kirby Sports Center (1,379); Easton, PA
January 17, 2024; 7:00 p.m., ESPN+		Lehigh	W 71–69	7–9 (3–2)	Alumni Hall (943); Annapolis, MD
January 20, 2024; 1:30 p.m., CBSSN		Army	W 57–53	8–9 (4–2)	Alumni Hall (5,255); Annapolis, MD
January 24, 2024; 7:00 p.m., ESPN+		at Bucknell	L 63–71	8–10 (4–3)	Sojka Pavilion (984); Lewisburg, PA
January 27, 2024; 1:00 p.m., ESPN+		Loyola (MD)	L 70–74	8–11 (4–4)	Alumni Hall (2,024); Annapolis, MD
January 31, 2024; 7:00 p.m., ESPN+		at Lehigh	L 65–77	8–12 (4–5)	Stabler Arena (1,153); Bethlehem, PA
February 3, 2024; 12:00 p.m., CBSSN		at Colgate	L 64–88	8–13 (4–6)	Cotterell Court (974); Hamilton, NY
February 7, 2024; 7:00 p.m., ESPN+		Bucknell	L 67–80	8–14 (4–7)	Alumni Hall (1,404); Annapolis, MD
February 10, 2024; 1:30 p.m., CBSSN		at Army	L 67–69 ^{OT}	8–15 (4–8)	Christl Arena (4,922); West Point, NY
February 14, 2024; 7:00 p.m., ESPN+		American	L 42–59	8–16 (4–9)	Alumni Hall (703); Annapolis, MD
February 17, 2024; 7:00 p.m., ESPN+		at Boston University	L 65–74	8–17 (4–10)	Case Gym (1,175); Boston, MA
February 21, 2024; 7:00 p.m., ESPN+		at Loyola (MD)	W 69–62	9–17 (5–10)	Reitz Arena (423); Baltimore, MD
February 25, 2024; 2:00 p.m., ESPN+		Holy Cross	W 76–66	10–17 (6–10)	Alumni Hall (2,537); Annapolis, MD
February 28, 2024; 7:00 p.m., ESPN+		Lafayette	W 62–58	11–17 (7–10)	Alumni Hall (730); Annapolis, MD
March 2, 2024; 2:00 p.m., ESPN+		at American	W 71–65	12–17 (8–10)	Bender Arena (1,648); Washington, D.C.
Patriot League tournament
March 5, 2024; 7:00 p.m., ESPN+	(7)	(10) Loyola (MD); First round	W 64–48	13–17	Alumni Hall (583); Annapolis, MD
March 7, 2024; 7:00 p.m., ESPN+	(7)	at (2) Boston University; Quarterfinals	L 61–70	13–18	Case Gym (715); Boston, MA
*Non-conference game. ^{#}Rankings from AP poll. (#) Tournament seedings in parentheses. All times are in Eastern.
