= 2023–24 Lafayette Leopards men's basketball team =

Men's college basketball season

2023–24 Lafayette Leopards men's basketball
- Conference: Patriot League
- Record: 11–21 (10–8 Patriot)
- Head coach: Mike McGarvey (1st season)
- Assistant coaches: Nikolai Arnold; Cameron Ayers; Sean O'Brien
- Home arena: Kirby Sports Center

2023–24 Patriot League men's basketball standings
	Conf.				Overall
Team	W		L	PCT	W		L	PCT
Colgate †	16	–	2	.889	25	–	10	.714
Boston University	10	–	8	.556	16	–	17	.485
Lafayette	10	–	8	.556	11	–	21	.344
American	10	–	8	.556	16	–	16	.500
Bucknell	10	–	8	.556	14	–	19	.424
Lehigh	9	–	9	.500	14	–	18	.438
Navy	8	–	10	.444	13	–	18	.419
Army	6	–	12	.333	10	–	22	.313
Holy Cross	6	–	12	.333	10	–	23	.303
Loyola	5	–	13	.278	7	–	25	.219
† 2024 Patriot League tournament winner

The 2023–24 Lafayette Leopards men's basketball team represented Lafayette College during the 2023–24 NCAA Division I men's basketball season. The Leopards, led by first-year head coach Mike McGarvey, played their home games at the Kirby Sports Center located in Easton, Pennsylvania as members of the Patriot League.

== Previous season ==
The Leopards finished the 2022–23 season 11–23, 7–11 in Patriot League play to finish in a four-way tie for sixth place. As the No. 6 seed in the Patriot League tournament, they defeated Lehigh and American to advance to the tournament championship for the first time since 2015, where they would lose to Colgate.

On February 21, 2023, two games before the end of the season, head coach Mike Jordan was placed on administrative leave following a complaint, with associate head coach Mike McGarvey being appointed as the acting head coach. On March 29, the school announced that McGarvey would take over as the team's permanent head coach.

== Roster ==
2023–24 Lafayette Leopards men's basketball team
Players
Coaches

Pos.	#	Name	Height	Weight	Year	Previous school	Hometown
G	0	Ryan Pettit	6 ft 1 in (1.85 m)	195 lb (88 kg)	So	Rutgers Prep	Westfield, New Jersey
G	1	Luka Savicevic	6 ft 3 in (1.91 m)	175 lb (79 kg)	Jr	Eastern Michigan	Skopje, North Macedonia
G	2	Jon Brantley	6 ft 3 in (1.91 m)	185 lb (84 kg)	Sr	Brother Rice High School	Farmington Hills, Michigan
G	3	Devin Hines	6 ft 4 in (1.93 m)	170 lb (77 kg)	Jr	Saint Andrew's School	West Palm Beach, Florida
G	4	Luke Rasmussen	6 ft 7 in (2.01 m)	195 lb (88 kg)	Fr	The Hill School	Haverford, Pennsylvania
G	5	Eric Sondberg	6 ft 7 in (2.01 m)	200 lb (91 kg)	Sr	South River High School	Davidsonville, Maryland
G	10	Mark Butler	5 ft 10 in (1.78 m)	165 lb (75 kg)	Fr	William Penn Charter School	Philadelphia, Pennsylvania
G	11	Isaiah Thompson	6 ft 0 in (1.83 m)	175 lb (79 kg)	Jr	Peddie School	White Plains, New York
C	13	Mike Bednostin	6 ft 11 in (2.11 m)	230 lb (104 kg)	Fr	Trinity High School	Kyiv, Ukraine
F	14	Kyle Jenkins	6 ft 7 in (2.01 m)	220 lb (100 kg)	Sr	Hotchkiss School	Higganum, Connecticut
C	15	Justin Vander Baan	7 ft 0 in (2.13 m)	240 lb (109 kg)	Jr	Boston College	Northbridge, Massachusetts
G	20	TJ Berger	6 ft 4 in (1.93 m)	185 lb (84 kg)	Jr	San Diego	Malvern, Pennsylvania
G/F	21	Andrew Phillips	6 ft 4 in (1.93 m)	200 lb (91 kg)	Fr	Malvern Prep	Downingtown, Pennsylvania
F	22	Chris Rubayo	6 ft 10 in (2.08 m)	225 lb (102 kg)	Jr	Montgomery High School	Skillman, New Jersey
G/F	23	Joshua Wyche	6 ft 6 in (1.98 m)	205 lb (93 kg)	Fr	Cristo Rey Philadelphia High School	Philadelphia, Pennsylvania

Head coach

- Mike McGarvey (Ursinus)

Assistant coach(es)

- Nikolai Arnold (Syracuse)
- Cameron Ayers (Bucknell)
- Sean O'Brien (Colgate)

Legend

- (C) Team captain
- (S) Suspended
- (I) Ineligible
- (W) Walk-on
- Injured
- Current redshirt

Roster
Last update: December 6, 2023

== Schedule and results ==
Date time, TV	Rank^{#}	Opponent^{#}	Result	Record	Site (attendance) city, state
Non-conference regular season
November 6, 2023*; 7:00 pm, ESPN+		at Saint Joseph's	L 60–81	0–1	Hagan Arena (1,793); Philadelphia, PA
November 10, 2023*; 11:00 pm, P12N		at UCLA	L 50–68	0–2	Pauley Pavilion (6,259); Los Angeles, CA
November 12, 2023*; 4:00 pm, ESPN+		at Pepperdine	L 53–76	0–3	Firestone Fieldhouse; Malibu, CA
November 19, 2023*; 1:00 pm, ESPN+		Wilkes	W 69–53	1–3	Kirby Sports Center (1,119); Easton, PA
November 24, 2023*; 4:30 pm, ESPN+		at Penn; Cathedral Classic	L 72–74	1–4	The Palestra (1,883); Philadelphia, PA
November 25, 2023*; 2:00 pm, ESPN+		vs. Monmouth; Cathedral Classic	L 53–63	1–5	The Palestra; Philadelphia, PA
November 26, 2023*; 12:00 pm, ESPN+		vs. Belmont; Cathedral Classic	L 69–79	1–6	The Palestra; Philadelphia, PA
November 29, 2023*; 7:00 pm, ESPN+		Drexel	L 48–69	1–7	Kirby Sports Center (1,017); Easton, PA
December 2, 2023*; 2:00 pm, ESPN+		Cornell	L 71–79	1–8	Kirby Sports Center (1,068); Easton, PA
December 5, 2023*; 7:00 pm, ESPN+		at Columbia	L 72–83	1–9	Levien Gymnasium (567); New York, NY
December 9, 2023*; 2:00 pm, ESPN+		La Salle	L 51–67	1–10	Kirby Sports Center (1,009); Easton, PA
December 21, 2023*; 2:00 pm, ESPN+		Quinnipiac	L 60–78	1–11	Kirby Sports Center (864); Easton, PA
December 30, 2023*; 4:00 pm, ESPN+		at Richmond	L 38–59	1–12	Robins Center (5,484); Richmond, VA
Patriot League regular season
January 3, 2024; 7:00 pm, ESPN+		Army	W 52–47	2–12 (1–0)	Kirby Sports Center (1,149); Easton, PA
January 6, 2024; 1:00 pm, ESPN+		at Boston University	W 59–51	3–12 (2–0)	Case Gym (553); Boston, MA
January 10, 2024; 7:00 pm, ESPN+		at Colgate	W 69–64	4–12 (3–0)	Cotterell Court (657); Hamilton, NY
January 13, 2024; 2:00 pm, ESPN+		Navy	W 78–62	5–12 (4–0)	Kirby Sports Center (1,379); Easton, PA
January 17, 2024; 7:00 pm, ESPN+		at Holy Cross	W 72–68	6–12 (5–0)	Hart Center (692); Worcester, MA
January 20, 2024; 2:00 pm, ESPN+		Bucknell	W 75–72 ^{OT}	7–12 (6–0)	Kirby Sports Center (1,293); Easton, PA
January 24, 2024; 7:00 pm, ESPN+		at Loyola (MD)	W 70–44	8–12 (7–0)	Reitz Arena (472); Baltimore, MD
January 27, 2024; 2:00 pm, ESPN+		Boston University	L 48–62	8–13 (7–1)	Kirby Sports Center (1,462); Easton, PA
January 31, 2024; 7:00 pm, ESPN+		American	L 66–69	8–14 (7–2)	Kirby Sports Center (1,289); Easton, PA
February 3, 2024; 6:00 pm, ESPN+		at Army	W 64–56 ^{OT}	9–14 (8–2)	Christl Arena (913); West Point, NY
February 7, 2024; 7:00 pm, ESPN+		Holy Cross	W 75–59	10–14 (9–2)	Kirby Sports Center (1,241); Easton, PA
February 10, 2024; 7:00 pm, ESPN+		at Lehigh	L 90–94 ^{OT}	10–15 (9–3)	Stabler Arena (1,962); Bethlehem, PA
February 14, 2024; 7:00 pm, ESPN+		Loyola (MD)	L 64–79	10–16 (9–4)	Kirby Sports Center (1,183); Easton, PA
February 17, 2024; 4:00 pm, ESPN+		at American	W 68–62	11–16 (10–4)	Bender Arena (1,087); Washington, D.C.
February 19, 2024; 6:00 pm, CBSSN		Colgate	L 62–67	11–17 (10–5)	Kirby Sports Center; Easton, PA
February 24, 2024; 2:00 pm, ESPN+		Lehigh	L 63–71	11–18 (10–6)	Kirby Sports Center (2,231); Easton, PA
February 28, 2024; 7:00 pm, ESPN+		at Navy	L 58–62	11–19 (10–7)	Alumni Hall (730); Annapolis, MD
March 2, 2024; 7:00 pm, ESPN+		at Bucknell	L 50–60	11–20 (10–8)	Sojka Pavilion (1,328); Lewisburg, PA
Patriot League tournament
March 7, 2024; 7:00 pm, ESPN+	(3)	(6) Lehigh; Quarterfinals	L 61–76	11–21	Kirby Sports Center (1,776); Easton, PA
*Non-conference game. ^{#}Rankings from AP Poll. (#) Tournament seedings in parentheses. All times are in Eastern.
