= 2023–24 Colgate Raiders men's basketball team =

American college basketball season

2023–24 Colgate Raiders men's basketball

Patriot League regular-season & tournament champions

NCAA tournament, first round
- Conference: Patriot League
- Record: 25–10 (16–2 Patriot)
- Head coach: Matt Langel (13th season)
- Assistant coaches: Camryn Crocker; Trey Montgomery; Pat Moore; Damon Sherman-Newsome
- Home arena: Cotterell Court

2023–24 Patriot League men's basketball standings
	Conf.				Overall
Team	W		L	PCT	W		L	PCT
Colgate †	16	–	2	.889	25	–	10	.714
Boston University	10	–	8	.556	16	–	17	.485
Lafayette	10	–	8	.556	11	–	21	.344
American	10	–	8	.556	16	–	16	.500
Bucknell	10	–	8	.556	14	–	19	.424
Lehigh	9	–	9	.500	14	–	18	.438
Navy	8	–	10	.444	13	–	18	.419
Army	6	–	12	.333	10	–	22	.313
Holy Cross	6	–	12	.333	10	–	23	.303
Loyola	5	–	13	.278	7	–	25	.219
† 2024 Patriot League tournament winner

The 2023–24 Colgate Raiders men's basketball team represented Colgate University in the 2023–24 NCAA Division I men's basketball season. The Raiders, led by 13th-year head coach Matt Langel, played their home games at Cotterell Court in Hamilton, New York as members of the Patriot League.

== Previous season ==
The Raiders finished the 2022–23 season 23–8, 17–1 in Patriot League play, to finish as regular-season champions for the third consecutive year. As the No. 1 seed, they defeated Loyola (MD), Army and Lafayette to win the Patriot League tournament championship, receiving the conference's automatic bid to the NCAA tournament for the third consecutive year. As the No. 15 seed in the Midwest Region, they lost in the first round of the NCAA tournament to Texas, finishing their season with an overall record of 26–9.

== Roster ==
2023–24 Colgate Raiders men's basketball team
Players
Coaches

Pos.	#	Name	Height	Weight	Year	Previous school	Hometown
G	0	Julian Scott	6 ft 2 in (1.88 m)	180 lb (82 kg)	Fr	Cheshire Academy	Rochester, MI
G	1	Brady Cummins	6 ft 6 in (1.98 m)	190 lb (86 kg)	So	Brooks School	York, ME
G	2	Braeden Smith	6 ft 0 in (1.83 m)	180 lb (82 kg)	So	Seattle Prep	Seattle, WA
G	3	Jalen Cox	6 ft 3 in (1.91 m)	165 lb (75 kg)	Fr	South Kent School	Los Angeles, CA
F	4	Ryan Moffatt	6 ft 7 in (2.01 m)	220 lb (100 kg)	Sr	Hempfield High School	Lancaster, PA
G	5	Nicolas Louis-Jacques	6 ft 4 in (1.93 m)	195 lb (88 kg)	Jr	Putnam Science Academy	Miami, FL
G	10	Chandler Baker	6 ft 5 in (1.96 m)	185 lb (84 kg)	Sr	Belmont Abbey	Woodstock, GA
G	13	Kyle Carlesimo	6 ft 2 in (1.88 m)	180 lb (82 kg)	So	Eastern Illinois	Seattle, WA
F	14	Keegan Records	6 ft 10 in (2.08 m)	250 lb (113 kg)	Sr	St. Andrew's School	South Kingstown, RI
F	23	Cooper Wright	6 ft 5 in (1.96 m)	195 lb (88 kg)	Fr	Saint Sebastian's School	Cambridge, MA
G	25	Parker Jones	6 ft 6 in (1.98 m)	190 lb (86 kg)	Fr	Worcester Academy	Sherman Oaks, CA
F	30	Sam Thomson	6 ft 9 in (2.06 m)	230 lb (104 kg)	Sr	Brooks School	Kitchener–Waterloo, ON
F	33	Sam Wright	6 ft 8 in (2.03 m)	240 lb (109 kg)	Fr	Spain Park High School	Hoover, AL
G	34	Alex Capitano	6 ft 4 in (1.93 m)	205 lb (93 kg)	Sr	Episcopal Academy	Malvern, PA
F	55	Jeff Woodward	6 ft 11 in (2.11 m)	270 lb (122 kg)	Sr	Methacton High School	Audubon, PA

Head coach

- Matt Langel (Penn)

Assistant coach(es)

- Camryn Crocker (Penn)
- Trey Montgomery (Samford)
- Pat Moore (Colgate)
- Damon Sherman-Newsome (Colgate)

Legend

- (C) Team captain
- (S) Suspended
- (I) Ineligible
- (W) Walk-on
- Injured
- Current redshirt

Roster
Last update: December 4, 2023

== Schedule and results ==
Date time, TV	Rank^{#}	Opponent^{#}	Result	Record	Site (attendance) city, state
Non-conference regular season
November 6, 2023*; 7:00 p.m., ESPN+		Brown	W 72–70	1–0	Cotterell Court (1,036); Hamilton, NY
November 14, 2023*; 7:00 p.m., ACCN		at Syracuse	L 75–79	1–1	JMA Wireless Dome (19,387); Syracuse, NY
November 17, 2023*; 6:00 p.m., ESPN+		vs. Yale; Atlantic Slam	L 50–68	1–2	Avenir Centre (–); Moncton, NB
November 18, 2023*; 4:00 p.m., ESPN+		vs. Gardner–Webb; Atlantic Slam	W 59–52	2–2	Avenir Centre (–); Moncton, NB
November 19, 2023*; 1:00 p.m., ESPN+		vs. Weber State; Atlantic Slam	W 57–55	3–2	Avenir Centre (–); Moncton, NB
November 22, 2023*; 2:00 p.m., ESPN+		Harvard	L 70–76	3–3	Cotterell Court (847); Hamilton, NY
November 29, 2023*; 8:30 p.m., ESPN+		Binghamton	W 84–49	4–3	Cotterell Court (762); Hamilton, NY
December 2, 2023*; 3:00 p.m., P12N		at No. 2 Arizona	L 55–82	4–4	McKale Center (14,688); Tucson, AZ
December 6, 2023*; 7:00 p.m., ESPN+		VTSU–Lyndon	W 115–37	5–4	Cotterell Court (578); Hamilton, NY
December 9, 2023*; 2:00 p.m., ESPN+		at Vermont	W 77–71	6–4	Patrick Gym (2,641); Burlington, VT
December 17, 2023*; 1:00 p.m., B1G		at No. 16 Illinois	L 57–74	6–5	State Farm Center (14,026); Champaign, IL
December 21, 2023*; 7:00 p.m., ESPN+		at Iona	L 65–85	6–6	Hynes Athletics Center (1,818); New Rochelle, NY
December 30, 2023*; 4:00 p.m., ESPN+		at Cornell	L 64–77	6–7	Newman Arena (964); Ithaca, NY
Patriot League regular season
January 3, 2024; 7:00 p.m., ESPN+		Loyola (MD)	W 78–55	7–7 (1–0)	Cotterell Court (520); Hamilton, NY
January 6, 2024; 1:00 p.m., ESPN+		at Navy	W 80–72	8–7 (2–0)	Alumni Hall (1,457); Annapolis, MD
January 10, 2024; 7:00 p.m., ESPN+		Lafayette	L 64–69	8–8 (2–1)	Cotterell Court (657); Hamilton, NY
January 13, 2024; 3:30 p.m., ESPN+		at Bucknell	W 84–73	9–8 (3–1)	Sojka Pavilion (1,347); Lewisburg, PA
January 17, 2024; 6:00 p.m., ESPN+		at Army	W 64–56	10–8 (4–1)	Christl Arena (532); West Point, NY
January 20, 2024; 2:00 p.m., ESPN+		Boston University	W 75–59	11–8 (5–1)	Cotterell Court (1,002); Hamilton, NY
January 22, 2024; 7:00 p.m., CBSSN		Lehigh	W 60–57	12–8 (6–1)	Cotterell Court (957); Hamilton, NY
January 27, 2024; 4:00 p.m., ESPN+		at American	W 73–54	13–8 (7–1)	Bender Arena (1,644); Washington, D.C.
January 31, 2024; 7:00 p.m., ESPN+		Army	W 74–55	14–8 (8–1)	Cotterell Court (747); Hamilton, NY
February 3, 2024; 12:00 p.m., CBSSN		Navy	W 88–64	15–8 (9–1)	Cotterell Court (974); Hamilton, NY
February 7, 2024; 7:00 p.m., ESPN+		at Boston University	W 74–64	16–8 (10–1)	Case Gym (1,019); Boston, MA
February 10, 2024; 5:00 p.m., ESPN+		at Loyola (MD)	W 76–62	17–8 (11–1)	Reitz Arena (687); Baltimore, MD
February 14, 2024; 7:00 p.m., ESPN+		Holy Cross	W 85–55	18–8 (12–1)	Cotterell Court (546); Hamilton, NY
February 17, 2024; 2:00 p.m., ESPN+		Bucknell	W 62–50	19–8 (13–1)	Cotterell Court (1,023); Hamilton, NY
February 19, 2024; 6:00 p.m., CBSSN		at Lafayette	W 67–62	20–8 (14–1)	Kirby Sports Center (1,547); Easton, PA
February 25, 2024; 2:00 p.m., ESPN+		American	L 64–66	20–9 (14–2)	Cotterell Court (1,158); Hamilton, NY
February 28, 2024; 7:00 p.m., ESPN+		at Holy Cross	W 77–58	21–9 (15–2)	Hart Center (1,077); Worcester, MA
March 2, 2024; 2:00 p.m., ESPN+		at Lehigh	W 63–60	22–9 (16–2)	Stabler Arena (1,339); Bethlehem, PA
Patriot League tournament
March 7, 2024; 7:00 p.m., ESPN+	(1)	(9) Holy Cross; Quarterfinals	W 81–64	23–9	Cotterell Court (−); Hamilton, NY
March 10, 2024; 2:00 p.m., CBSSN	(1)	(5) Bucknell; Semifinals	W 68–65	24–9	Cotterell Court (−); Hamilton, NY
March 13, 2024; 7:30 p.m., CBSSN	(1)	(6) Lehigh; Championship	W 74–55	25–9	Cotterell Court (1,533); Hamilton, NY
NCAA tournament
March 22, 2024; 12:40 p.m., TruTV	(14 W)	vs. (3 W) No. 14 Baylor; First round	L 67–92	25–10	FedExForum; Memphis, TN
*Non-conference game. ^{#}Rankings from AP poll. (#) Tournament seedings in parentheses. All times are in Eastern.
