= Spatola =

Spatola is a surname. Notable people with the surname include:

- Chris Spatola (1979–2026), American college basketball player, coach, and sports analyst
- Nina Roth (née Spatola; born 1988), American curler
