= 2023–24 Bucknell Bison men's basketball team =

American college basketball season

2023–24 Bucknell Bison men's basketball
- Conference: Patriot League
- Record: 14–19 (10–8 Patriot)
- Head coach: John Griffin III (1st season)
- Associate head coach: Matt Griffin
- Assistant coaches: Branden McDonald; Jesse Flannery
- Home arena: Sojka Pavilion

2023–24 Patriot League men's basketball standings
	Conf.				Overall
Team	W		L	PCT	W		L	PCT
Colgate †	16	–	2	.889	25	–	10	.714
Boston University	10	–	8	.556	16	–	17	.485
Lafayette	10	–	8	.556	11	–	21	.344
American	10	–	8	.556	16	–	16	.500
Bucknell	10	–	8	.556	14	–	19	.424
Lehigh	9	–	9	.500	14	–	18	.438
Navy	8	–	10	.444	13	–	18	.419
Army	6	–	12	.333	10	–	22	.313
Holy Cross	6	–	12	.333	10	–	23	.303
Loyola	5	–	13	.278	7	–	25	.219
† 2024 Patriot League tournament winner

The 2023–24 Bucknell Bison men's basketball team represented Bucknell University during the 2023–24 NCAA Division I men's basketball season. The Bison, led by first-year head coach John Griffin III, played their home games at Sojka Pavilion in Lewisburg, Pennsylvania as members of the Patriot League.

The Bison finished the season 13–18, 10–8 in Patriot League play, to finish in a four-way tie for second place. As the No. 5 seed in the Patriot League tournament, they defeated American in the first round before falling to eventual tournament champions Colgate.

== Previous season ==
The Bison finished the 2022–23 season 12–20, 5–13 in Patriot League play, to finish in last place. They lost to American in the first round of the Patriot League tournament.

On March 3, 2023, the school fired head coach Nathan Davis. On March 21, the school named former Bucknell player and Saint Joseph's assistant coach John Griffin III the team's new head coach.

== Roster ==
2023–24 Bucknell Bison men's basketball team
Players
Coaches

Pos.	#	Name	Height	Weight	Year	Hometown
F	0	Patrick O'Brien	6 ft 8 in (2.03 m)	210 lb (95 kg)	Fr	Warrenton, VA
F	1	Ian Motta	6 ft 6 in (1.98 m)	198 lb (90 kg)	Jr	Allen, TX
F	2	Brady Muller	6 ft 4 in (1.93 m)	209 lb (95 kg)	So	Wyckoff, NJ
C	3	Noah Williamson	7 ft 0 in (2.13 m)	244 lb (111 kg)	So	Riga, Latvia
G	4	Josh Fulton	6 ft 6 in (1.98 m)	186 lb (84 kg)	So	Atlanta, GA
G	5	Elvin IV Edmonds	6 ft 2 in (1.88 m)	201 lb (91 kg)	Jr	Hopewell, VA
G	10	Brandon McCreesh	6 ft 4 in (1.93 m)	180 lb (82 kg)	Fr	The Bronx, NY
G	11	Josh Adoh	6 ft 4 in (1.93 m)	205 lb (93 kg)	Sr	Bellflower, CA
G	12	Quin Berger	6 ft 2 in (1.88 m)	200 lb (91 kg)	So	Malvern, PA
G	13	Josh Bascoe	6 ft 0 in (1.83 m)	178 lb (81 kg)	Jr	Milton, ON
F	22	Ruot Bijiek	6 ft 9 in (2.06 m)	187 lb (85 kg)	So	Waukee, IA
F	23	Pip Ajayi	6 ft 7 in (2.01 m)	230 lb (104 kg)	Jr	Calgary, AB
G	24	Jack Forrest	6 ft 5 in (1.96 m)	208 lb (94 kg)	Sr	Lower Merion, PA
G	25	Alek Delev	6 ft 0 in (1.83 m)	152 lb (69 kg)	Sr	Sofia, Bulgaria

Head coach

- John Griffin III (Bucknell)

Assistant coach(es)

- Matt Griffin (Boston University)
- Branden McDonald (Virginia Union)
- Jesse Flannery (Johns Hopkins)

Legend

- (C) Team captain
- (S) Suspended
- (I) Ineligible
- (W) Walk-on
- Injured
- Current redshirt

Roster
Last update: December 3, 2023

== Schedule and results ==
Date time, TV	Rank^{#}	Opponent^{#}	Result	Record	Site (attendance) city, state
Exhibition
October 28, 2023*; 4:00 p.m.		at Mount St. Mary's; Behan Strong Exhibition Game	L 67–72 ^{2OT}		Knott Arena (850); Emmitsburg, MD
Non-conference regular season
November 6, 2023*; 7:00 p.m., ESPN+		Delaware	L 57–78	0–1	Sojka Pavilion (2,427); Lewisburg, PA
November 12, 2022*; 4:00 p.m., ESPN+		at Penn	L 61–80	0–2	The Palestra (1,571); Philadelphia, PA
November 11, 2023*; 7:00 p.m., ESPN+		at Niagara	W 73–64	1–2	Gallagher Center (1,239); Lewiston, NY
November 14, 2023*; 6:30 p.m., ESPN+		vs. La Salle; Blue Devil Challenge	L 57–69	1–3	Cameron Indoor Stadium (1,612); Durham, NC
November 17, 2023*; 6:00 p.m., ACCNX		at No. 9 Duke; Blue Devil Challenge	L 60–90	1–4	Cameron Indoor Stadium (9,314); Durham, NC
November 20, 2023*; 7:00 p.m., ESPN+		Southern Indiana; Blue Devil Challenge	W 67–56	2–4	Sojka Pavilion (692); Lewisburg, PA
November 22, 2023*; 7:00 p.m., ESPN+		at St. Bonaventure	L 61–67	2–5	Reilly Center (3,497); Olean, NY
November 25, 2023*; 4:00 p.m., ESPN+		at Marist	L 49–73	2–6	McCann Arena (952); Poughkeepsie, NY
November 29, 2023*; 7:00 p.m., ESPN+		Princeton	L 71–85	2–7	Sojka Pavilion (834); Lewisburg, PA
December 2, 2023*; 12:00 p.m., BTN		at Penn State	W 76–67	3–7	Bryce Jordan Center (8,590); University Park, PA
December 16, 2023*; 3:30 p.m., ESPN+		Radford	L 63–70	3–8	Sojka Pavilion (892); Lewisburg, PA
December 22, 2023*; 2:00 p.m., NEC Front Row		at Merrimack	L 52–68	3–9	Hammel Court (587); North Andover, MA
December 30, 2023*; 2:00 p.m., ESPN+		Saint Peter's	L 58–67	3–10	Sojka Pavilion (814); Lewisburg, PA
Patriot League regular season
January 3, 2024; 7:00 p.m., ESPN+		Holy Cross	W 70–58	4–10 (1–0)	Sojka Pavilion (824); Lewisburg, PA
January 6, 2024; 2:00 p.m., CBSSN		American	L 63–71	4–11 (1–1)	Sojka Pavilion (634); Lewisburg, PA
January 10, 2024; 7:00 p.m., ESPN+		at Lehigh	W 86–80	5–11 (2–1)	Stabler Arena (751); Bethlehem, PA
January 13, 2024; 3:30 p.m., ESPN+		Colgate	L 73–84	5–12 (2–2)	Sojka Pavilion (1,347); Lewisburg, PA
January 17, 2024; 7:00 p.m., ESPN+		at Boston University	W 73–57	6–12 (3–2)	Case Gym (1,101); Boston, MA
January 20, 2024; 2:00 p.m., ESPN+		at Lafayette	L 72–75 ^{OT}	6–13 (3–3)	Kirby Sports Center (1,293); Easton, PA
January 24, 2024; 7:00 p.m., ESPN+		Navy	W 71–63	7–13 (4–3)	Sojka Pavilion (984); Lewisburg, PA
January 27, 2024; 7:00 p.m., ESPN+		at Army	W 66–56	8–13 (5–3)	Christl Arena (1,200); West Point, NY
January 31, 2024; 7:00 p.m., ESPN+		Loyola (MD)	W 67–52	9–13 (6–3)	Sojka Pavilion (865); Lewisburg, PA
February 3, 2024; 4:00 p.m., ESPN+		at American	L 66–75 ^{OT}	9–14 (6–4)	Bender Arena (1,257); Washington, D.C.
February 7, 2024; 7:00 p.m., ESPN+		at Navy	W 80–67	10–14 (7–4)	Alumni Hall (1,404); Annapolis, MD
February 10, 2024; 2:00 p.m., ESPN+		Boston University	L 62–77	10–15 (7–5)	Sojka Pavilion (1,493); Lewisburg, PA
February 12, 2024; 7:00 p.m., CBSSN		Lehigh	L 63–71 ^{OT}	10–16 (7–6)	Sojka Pavilion (1,398); Lewisburg, PA
February 17, 2024; 2:00 p.m., ESPN+		at Colgate	L 50–62	10–17 (7–7)	Cotterell Court (1,023); Hamilton, NY
February 21, 2024; 7:00 p.m., ESPN+		at Holy Cross	L 59–73	10–18 (7–8)	Hart Center (1,469); Worcester, MA
February 25, 2024; 2:00 p.m., ESPN+		Army	W 54–41	11–18 (8–8)	Sojka Pavilion (1,207); Lewisburg, PA
February 28, 2024; 7:00 p.m., ESPN+		at Loyola (MD)	W 68–46	12–18 (9–8)	Reitz Arena (508); Baltimore, MD
March 2, 2024; 7:00 p.m., ESPN+		Lafayette	W 60–50	13–18 (10–8)	Sojka Pavilion (1,328); Lewisburg, PA
Patriot League tournament
March 7, 2024; 7:00 p.m., ESPN+	(5)	at (4) American; Quarterfinals	W 80–57	14–18	Bender Arena (1,172); Washington, D.C.
March 10, 2024; 2:00 p.m., CBSSN	(5)	at (1) Colgate; Semifinals	L 65–68	14–19	Cotterell Court; Hamilton, NY
*Non-conference game. ^{#}Rankings from AP poll. (#) Tournament seedings in parentheses. All times are in Eastern.
