= 2023–24 Boston University Terriers men's basketball team =

American college basketball season

2023–24 Boston University Terriers men's basketball
- Conference: Patriot League
- Record: 16–17 (10–8 Patriot)
- Head coach: Joe Jones (13th season)
- Associate head coach: Mike Quinn
- Assistant coaches: Curtis Wilson; Al Paul
- Home arena: Case Gym

2023–24 Patriot League men's basketball standings
	Conf.				Overall
Team	W		L	PCT	W		L	PCT
Colgate †	16	–	2	.889	25	–	10	.714
Boston University	10	–	8	.556	16	–	17	.485
Lafayette	10	–	8	.556	11	–	21	.344
American	10	–	8	.556	16	–	16	.500
Bucknell	10	–	8	.556	14	–	19	.424
Lehigh	9	–	9	.500	14	–	18	.438
Navy	8	–	10	.444	13	–	18	.419
Army	6	–	12	.333	10	–	22	.313
Holy Cross	6	–	12	.333	10	–	23	.303
Loyola	5	–	13	.278	7	–	25	.219
† 2024 Patriot League tournament winner

The 2023–24 Boston University Terriers men's basketball team represented Boston University during the 2023–24 NCAA Division I men's basketball season. The Terriers, led by 13th-year head coach Joe Jones, played their home games at Case Gym in Boston, Massachusetts as members of the Patriot League.

== Previous season ==
The Terriers finished the 2022–23 season 15–17, 8–10 in Patriot League play to finish in fifth place. As the #5 seed in the Patriot League tournament, they were defeated in overtime by #4 seed Army in the quarterfinals.

== Roster ==
2023–24 Boston University Terriers men's basketball team
Players
Coaches

Pos.	#	Name	Height	Weight	Year	Previous school	Hometown
G/F	0	Matai Baptiste	6 ft 7 in (2.01 m)	215 lb (98 kg)	Fr	Orangeville Prep	Toronto, Ontario
G	1	Ethan Okwuosa	6 ft 2 in (1.88 m)	195 lb (88 kg)	Jr	Southern New Hampshire	North Haven, Connecticut
G	2	Ben Palacios	6 ft 5 in (1.96 m)	200 lb (91 kg)	Jr	Maryville	Kansas City, Missouri
F	3	Malcolm Chimezie	6 ft 8 in (2.03 m)	220 lb (100 kg)	Jr	Stepinac High School	Yonkers, New York
G	5	Kyrone Alexander	6 ft 4 in (1.93 m)	200 lb (91 kg)	Fr	South Shore High School	Bridgetown, Barbados
G	13	Ryan Sutliff	6 ft 4 in (1.93 m)	185 lb (84 kg)	Jr	Boston Latin School	Boston, Massachusetts
F	14	Nico Nobili	6 ft 10 in (2.08 m)	220 lb (100 kg)	So	Paul VI High School	Bologna, Italy
G	20	Michael McNair	6 ft 5 in (1.96 m)	185 lb (84 kg)	Fr	Linfield Christian School	Temecula, California
F	21	Andrew Patnode	6 ft 8 in (2.03 m)	230 lb (104 kg)	Sr	Perkiomen School	Saratoga Springs, New York
G/F	22	Anthony Morales	6 ft 8 in (2.03 m)	195 lb (88 kg)	Sr	Beaver Country Day School	Boston, Massachusetts
G	24	Miles Brewster	6 ft 3 in (1.91 m)	175 lb (79 kg)	Sr	Hotchkiss School	Brooklyn, New York
G	25	Spencer Joyner	6 ft 4 in (1.93 m)	195 lb (88 kg)	Fr	Arts High School	Hackensack, New Jersey
G	30	Ben Roy	6 ft 0 in (1.83 m)	170 lb (77 kg)	So	Manasquan High School	Spring Lake Heights, New Jersey
F	32	Evan Haber	6 ft 4 in (1.93 m)	200 lb (91 kg)	Sr	Calabasas High School	Calabasas, California
F	41	Otto Landrum	6 ft 9 in (2.06 m)	215 lb (98 kg)	So	Torrey Pines High School	San Diego, California

Head coach

- Joe Jones (SUNY–Oswego)

Assistant coach(es)

- Mike Quinn (Bentley)
- Curtis Wilson (Adelphi)
- Al Paul (SUNY Delhi)

Legend

- (C) Team captain
- (S) Suspended
- (I) Ineligible
- (W) Walk-on
- Injured
- Current redshirt

Roster
Last update: December 4, 2023

== Schedule and results ==
Date time, TV	Rank^{#}	Opponent^{#}	Result	Record	Site (attendance) city, state
Non-conference regular season
November 6, 2023*; 8:00 pm, NESN+/FloHoops		at Northeastern	L 58–67	0–1	Matthews Arena (2,336); Boston, MA
November 10, 2023*; 7:00 pm, B1G+		at Rutgers; Scarlet Knight Classic	L 45–69	0–2	Jersey Mike's Arena (8,000); Piscataway, NJ
November 14, 2023*; 7:30 pm		at Howard; Scarlet Knight Classic	L 53–64	0–3	Burr Gymnasium (2,413); Washington, D.C.
November 16, 2023*; 7:00 pm, ESPN+		Bryant; Scarlet Knight Classic	W 95–79	1–3	Case Gym (1,268); Boston, MA
November 21, 2023*; 7:00 pm, ESPN+		at Davidson	L 45–69	1–4	John M. Belk Arena (2,463); Davidson, NC
November 26, 2023*; 2:00 pm, ESPN+		VTSU–Johnson	W 90–49	2–4	Case Gym (430); Boston, MA
November 29, 2023*; 7:00 pm, ESPN+		at Albany	L 72–86	2–5	Broadview Center (3,103); Albany, NY
December 2, 2023*; 2:00 pm, NEC Front Row		at Sacred Heart	W 70–49	3–5	William H. Pitt Center (617); Fairfield, CT
December 6, 2023*; 7:00 pm, ESPN+		Maine	L 65–74	3–6	Case Gym (653); Boston, MA
December 10, 2023*; 1:00 pm, NEC Front Row		at Wagner	W 73–59	4–6	Spiro Sports Center (905); Staten Island, NY
December 13, 2023*; 7:00 pm, NESN/ESPN+		at Dartmouth	L 56–63	4–7	Leede Arena (449); Hanover, NH
December 22, 2023*; 12:00 pm, ESPN+		UMass Lowell	L 63–71	4–8	Case Gym (450); Boston, MA
December 30, 2023*; 2:00 pm, ESPN+		Merrimack	W 74–63	5–8	Case Gym (860); Boston, MA
Patriot League regular season
January 3, 2024; 7:00 pm, ESPN+		at Navy	L 60–62	5–9 (0–1)	Alumni Hall (1,007); Annapolis, MD
January 6, 2024; 1:00 pm, ESPN+		Lafayette	L 51–59	5–10 (0–2)	Case Gym (553); Boston, MA
January 10, 2024; 7:00 pm, ESPN+		American	W 72–68	6–10 (1–2)	Case Gym (454); Boston, MA
January 13, 2024; 5:00 pm, ESPN+		at Loyola (MD)	W 60–58	7–10 (2–2)	Reitz Arena (492); Baltimore, MD
January 17, 2024; 7:00 pm, ESPN+		Bucknell	L 57–73	7–11 (2–3)	Case Gym (1,101); Boston, MA
January 20, 2024; 2:00 pm, ESPN+		at Colgate	L 59–75	7–12 (2–4)	Cotterell Court (1,002); Hamilton, NY
January 24, 2024; 7:00 pm, ESPN+		Army	L 59–69	7–13 (2–5)	Case Gym (668); Boston, MA
January 27, 2024; 2:00 pm, ESPN+		at Lafayette	W 62–48	8–13 (3–5)	Kirby Sports Center (1,462); Easton, PA
January 29, 2024; 7:00 pm, CBSSN		at Holy Cross; Turnpike Trophy	L 63–65	8–14 (3–6)	Hart Center (2,364); Worcester, MA
February 3, 2024; 1:00 pm, ESPN+		Lehigh	W 72–71	9–14 (4–6)	Case Gym (1,002); Boston, MA
February 7, 2024; 7:00 pm, ESPN+		Colgate	L 64–74	9–15 (4–7)	Case Gym (1,019); Boston, MA
February 10, 2024; 2:00 pm, ESPN+		at Bucknell	W 77–62	10–15 (5–7)	Sojka Pavilion (1,493); Lewisburg, PA
February 14, 2024; 6:00 pm, ESPN+		at Army	L 50–65	10–16 (5–8)	Christl Arena (549); West Point, NY
February 17, 2024; 1:00 pm, ESPN+		Navy	W 74–65	11–16 (6–8)	Case Gym (1,175); Boston, MA
February 21, 2024; 7:00 pm, ESPN+		at American	W 67–52	12–16 (7–8)	Bender Arena (691); Washington, D.C.
February 25, 2024; 2:00 pm, ESPN+		Loyola (MD)	W 82–79 ^{OT}	13–16 (8–8)	Case Gym (1,034); Boston, MA
February 28, 2024; 6:00 pm, ESPN+		at Lehigh	W 64–62 ^{OT}	14–16 (9–8)	Stabler Arena (983); Bethlehem, PA
March 2, 2024; 12:00 pm, ESPN+		Holy Cross; Turnpike Trophy	W 94–84	15–16 (10–8)	Case Gym; Boston, MA
Patriot League tournament
March 7, 2024; 7:00 pm, ESPN+	(2)	(7) Navy; Quarterfinals	W 70–61	16–16	Case Gym (715); Boston, MA
March 10, 2024; 4:00 pm, CBSSN	(2)	(6) Lehigh; Semifinals	L 79–84 ^{OT}	16–17	Case Gym (923); Boston, MA
*Non-conference game. ^{#}Rankings from AP Poll. (#) Tournament seedings in parentheses. All times are in Eastern.
