= 2023–24 Loyola Greyhounds men's basketball team =

American college basketball season

2023–24 Loyola Greyhounds men's basketball
- Conference: Patriot League
- Record: 7–25 (5–13 Patriot)
- Head coach: Tavaras Hardy (6th season)
- Assistant coaches: Mike Brennan; Matt Miller; JerShon Cobb
- Home arena: Reitz Arena

2023–24 Patriot League men's basketball standings
	Conf.				Overall
Team	W		L	PCT	W		L	PCT
Colgate †	16	–	2	.889	25	–	10	.714
Boston University	10	–	8	.556	16	–	17	.485
Lafayette	10	–	8	.556	11	–	21	.344
American	10	–	8	.556	16	–	16	.500
Bucknell	10	–	8	.556	14	–	19	.424
Lehigh	9	–	9	.500	14	–	18	.438
Navy	8	–	10	.444	13	–	18	.419
Army	6	–	12	.333	10	–	22	.313
Holy Cross	6	–	12	.333	10	–	23	.303
Loyola	5	–	13	.278	7	–	25	.219
† 2024 Patriot League tournament winner

The 2023–24 Loyola Greyhounds men's basketball team represented Loyola University Maryland during the 2023–24 NCAA Division I men's basketball season. The Greyhounds, led by sixth-year head coach Tavaras Hardy, played their home games at Reitz Arena located in Baltimore, Maryland as members of the Patriot League.

== Previous season ==
The Greyhounds finished the 2022–23 season 13–20, 7–11 in Patriot League play, to finish in a four-way tie for sixth place. As the No. 8 seed in the Patriot League tournament, they defeated Holy Cross in the first round, before losing to Colgate in the quarterfinals.

== Roster ==
2023–24 Loyola Greyhounds men's basketball team
Players
Coaches

Pos.	#	Name	Height	Weight	Year	Previous school	Hometown
G	0	D'Angelo Stines	6 ft 2 in (1.88 m)	185 lb (84 kg)	Jr	Old Dominion	Columbia, MD
F	1	Veljko Ilic	6 ft 10 in (2.08 m)	240 lb (109 kg)	Jr	Hoosac School	Gornji Milanovac, Serbia
G	2	Troy Jr. Cicero	6 ft 2 in (1.88 m)	185 lb (84 kg)	Fr	Romeoville High School	Joliet, IL
G	3	Jordan Stiemke	6 ft 5 in (1.96 m)	205 lb (93 kg)	Fr	Loomis Chaffee School	Bel Air, MD
F	4	Alonso Faure	6 ft 10 in (2.08 m)	230 lb (104 kg)	Sr	IES Fuente San Luis	Busot, Spain
F	5	Isaiah Alexander	6 ft 7 in (2.01 m)	190 lb (86 kg)	So	Archbishop Stepinac High School	The Bronx, NY
F	10	Golden Dike	6 ft 10 in (2.08 m)	248 lb (112 kg)	GS	SEK El Castillo International School	Málaga, Spain
F	11	Milos Ilic	6 ft 10 in (2.08 m)	235 lb (107 kg)	Jr	Hoosac School	Gornji Milanovac, Serbia
G	12	Deon Perry	5 ft 8 in (1.73 m)	160 lb (73 kg)	So	Our Lady of Mount Carmel School	Baltimore, MD
G	14	Garrett Brennan	6 ft 4 in (1.93 m)	197 lb (89 kg)	So	St. Stephen's & St. Agnes School	Reston, VA
G	15	Tyson Commander	6 ft 4 in (1.93 m)	185 lb (84 kg)	So	The John Carroll School	Belcamp, MD
G	20	Chris Kuzemka	6 ft 0 in (1.83 m)	183 lb (83 kg)	Jr	Centreville High School	Clifton, VA
G	21	Charlie Weisberg	6 ft 3 in (1.91 m)	190 lb (86 kg)	Jr	Millbrook School	Brooklyn, NY
G	22	Samuel Gibbs	6 ft 3 in (1.91 m)	195 lb (88 kg)	So	Archbishop Stepinac High School	Rye, NY
G	23	David III Brown	6 ft 5 in (1.96 m)	208 lb (94 kg)	Jr	Bishop McNamara High School	La Plata, MD
G	30	Matt Gray	6 ft 8 in (2.03 m)	205 lb (93 kg)	Fr	Northfield Mount Hermon School	Ashburn, VA

Head coach

- Tavaras Hardy (Northwestern)

Assistant coach(es)

- Mike Brennan (Princeton)
- Matt Miller (St. Mary's (MD))
- JerShon Cobb (Northwestern)

Legend

- (C) Team captain
- (S) Suspended
- (I) Ineligible
- (W) Walk-on
- Injured
- Current redshirt

Roster
Last update: December 5, 2023

== Schedule and results ==
Date time, TV	Rank^{#}	Opponent^{#}	Result	Record	Site (attendance) city, state
Exhibition
October 29, 2023*; 7:00 p.m., ESPN+		McDaniel	W 58–40	–	Reitz Arena; Baltimore, MD
Non-conference regular season
November 6, 2023*; 8:00 p.m., SECN+/ESPN+		at Florida	L 73–93	0–1	O'Connell Center (7,023); Gainesville, FL
November 11, 2023*; 11:30 a.m., ESPN+		at Brown	W 77–75 ^{OT}	1–1	Pizzitola Sports Center (846); Providence, RI
November 15, 2023*; 7:00 p.m., ESPN+		Binghamton	L 57–63	1–2	Reitz Arena (1,204); Baltimore, MD
November 18, 2023*; 11:00 a.m.		vs. Sacred Heart; UMBC MTE	L 51–66	1–3	Chesapeake Employers Insurance Arena (115); Catonsville, MD
November 19, 2023*; 1:00 p.m., ESPN+		at UMBC; UMBC MTE	L 79–94	1–4	Chesapeake Employers Insurance Arena (1,183); Catonsville, MD
November 25, 2023*; 12:00 p.m., SECN+/ESPN+		at Missouri	L 70–78	1–5	Mizzou Arena (9,762); Columbia, MO
November 29, 2023*; 7:00 p.m., ESPN+		at Columbia	L 57–69	1–6	Levien Gymnasium (599); New York, NY
December 2, 2023*; 5:00 p.m., ESPN+		Delaware State	L 73–79 ^{OT}	1–7	Reitz Arena (612); Baltimore, MD
December 6, 2023*; 6:30 p.m., ESPN+		at La Salle	L 61–62	1–8	Tom Gola Arena (1,269); Philadelphia, PA
December 9, 2023*; 5:00 p.m., ESPN+		Mount St. Mary's	L 64–77	1–9	Reitz Arena (821); Baltimore, MD
December 16, 2023*; 6:00 p.m., ESPN+		at George Mason	L 54–62	1–10	EagleBank Arena (2,780); Fairfax, VA
December 22, 2023*; 12:00 p.m., ESPN+		St. Mary's (MD)	W 91–57	2–10	Reitz Arena (312); Baltimore, MD
December 29, 2023*; 7:00 p.m., ESPN+		at Saint Joseph's	L 56–97	2–11	Hagan Arena (2,872); Philadelphia, PA
Patriot League regular season
January 3, 2024; 7:00 p.m., ESPN+		at Colgate	L 55–78	2–12 (0–1)	Cotterell Court (520); Hamilton, NY
January 6, 2024; 5:00 p.m., ESPN+		Lehigh	L 76–88	2–13 (0–2)	Reitz Arena (307); Baltimore, MD
January 10, 2024; 6:00 p.m., ESPN+		at Army	W 71–65	3–13 (1–2)	Christl Arena (604); West Point, NY
January 13, 2024; 5:00 p.m., ESPN+		Boston University	L 58–60	3–14 (1–3)	Reitz Arena (492); Baltimore, MD
January 15, 2024; 7:00 p.m., CBSSN		American	L 52–66	3–15 (1–4)	Reitz Arena (1,243); Baltimore, MD
January 20, 2024; 2:00 p.m., ESPN+		at Holy Cross	L 78–86	3–16 (1–5)	Hart Center (876); Worcester, MA
January 24, 2024; 7:00 p.m., ESPN+		Lafayette	L 44–70	3–17 (1–6)	Reitz Arena (472); Baltimore, MD
January 27, 2024; 1:00 p.m., ESPN+		at Navy	W 74–70	4–17 (2–6)	Alumni Hall (2,024); Annapolis, MD
January 31, 2024; 7:00 p.m., ESPN+		at Bucknell	L 52–67	4–18 (2–7)	Sojka Pavilion (865); Lewisburg, PA
February 3, 2024; 5:00 p.m., ESPN+		Holy Cross	L 67–70	4–19 (2–8)	Reitz Arena (480); Baltimore, MD
February 7, 2024; 7:00 p.m., ESPN+		at American	W 44–43	5–19 (3–8)	Bender Arena (841); Washington, D.C.
February 10, 2024; 5:00 p.m., ESPN+		Colgate	L 62–76	5–20 (3–9)	Reitz Arena (687); Baltimore, MD
February 14, 2024; 7:00 p.m., ESPN+		at Lafayette	W 79–64	6–20 (4–9)	Kirby Sports Center (1,183); Easton, PA
February 17, 2024; 2:00 p.m., ESPN+		at Lehigh	L 70–75	6–21 (4–10)	Stabler Arena (1,024); Bethlehem, PA
February 21, 2024; 7:00 p.m., ESPN+		Navy	L 62–69	6–22 (4–11)	Reitz Arena (423); Baltimore, MD
February 25, 2024; 2:00 p.m., ESPN+		at Boston University	L 79–82 ^{OT}	6–23 (4–12)	Case Gym (1,034); Boston, MA
February 28, 2024; 7:00 p.m., ESPN+		Bucknell	L 46–68	6–24 (4–13)	Reitz Arena (508); Baltimore, MD
March 2, 2024; 5:00 p.m., ESPN+		Army	W 69–68	7–24 (5–13)	Reitz Arena (943); Baltimore, MD
Patriot League tournament
March 5, 2024; 7:00 p.m., ESPN+	(10)	at (7) Navy; First round	L 48–64	7–25	Alumni Hall (583); Annapolis, MD
*Non-conference game. ^{#}Rankings from AP poll. (#) Tournament seedings in parentheses. All times are in Eastern.
