= 2023–24 American Eagles men's basketball team =

American college basketball season

2023–24 American Eagles men's basketball
- Conference: Patriot League
- Record: 16–16 (10–8 Patriot)
- Head coach: Duane Simpkins (1st season)
- Assistant coaches: Nate Bollinger; Jackie Manuel; Isaiah Tate
- Home arena: Bender Arena

2023–24 Patriot League men's basketball standings
| | Conf. | | | | Overall |
| Team | W | | L | PCT | W | | L | PCT |
|---|---|---|---|---|---|---|---|---|
| Colgate † | 16 | – | 2 | .889 | 25 | – | 10 | .714 |
| Boston University | 10 | – | 8 | .556 | 16 | – | 17 | .485 |
| Lafayette | 10 | – | 8 | .556 | 11 | – | 21 | .344 |
| American | 10 | – | 8 | .556 | 16 | – | 16 | .500 |
| Bucknell | 10 | – | 8 | .556 | 14 | – | 19 | .424 |
| Lehigh | 9 | – | 9 | .500 | 14 | – | 18 | .438 |
| Navy | 8 | – | 10 | .444 | 13 | – | 18 | .419 |
| Army | 6 | – | 12 | .333 | 10 | – | 22 | .313 |
| Holy Cross | 6 | – | 12 | .333 | 10 | – | 23 | .303 |
| Loyola | 5 | – | 13 | .278 | 7 | – | 25 | .219 |
† 2024 Patriot League tournament winner

The 2023–24 American Eagles men's basketball team represented American University during the 2023–24 NCAA Division I men's basketball season. The Eagles, led by first-year head coach Duane Simpkins, played their home games at Bender Arena located in Washington, D.C. as members of the Patriot League.

== Previous season ==
The Eagles finished the 2022–23 season 17–15, 7–11 in Patriot League play, to finish in a four-way tie for sixth place. As the No. 7 seed in the Patriot League tournament, they defeated Bucknell and Navy before losing to Lafayette in the semifinals.

Following the conclusion of the season, head coach Mike Brennan was fired. On April 1, 2023, the school would name George Mason assistant coach Duane Simpkins the team's new head coach.

== Roster ==
2023–24 American Eagles men's basketball team
Players
Coaches

| Pos. | # | Name | Height | Weight | Year | Previous school | Hometown |
|---|---|---|---|---|---|---|---|
| G | 0 | Chris Gleaton | 6 ft 3 in (1.91 m) | 175 lb (79 kg) | Sr | Trinity-Pawling | Thiells, New York |
| G | 1 | Elijah Stephens | 5 ft 9 in (1.75 m) | 165 lb (75 kg) | Jr | China Spring | Waco, Texas |
| G | 2 | Nick Marshall | 6 ft 4 in (1.93 m) | 180 lb (82 kg) | So | Loyola (MD) | Clarksville, Maryland |
| G | 3 | Colin Smalls | 6 ft 2 in (1.88 m) | 185 lb (84 kg) | Sr | St. Andrew's | Upper Marlboro, Maryland |
| G | 4 | Lincoln Ball | 6 ft 6 in (1.98 m) | 215 lb (98 kg) | Sr | George Washington | Williamsport, Maryland |
| G | 5 | Alex Daniels | 6 ft 3 in (1.91 m) | 180 lb (82 kg) | Jr | Weatherford College | Duluth, Georgia |
| G | 8 | Lorenzo Donadio | 6 ft 4 in (1.93 m) | 190 lb (86 kg) | Sr | Boys' Latin | Rome, Italy |
| G | 10 | Adrian Samuels | 6 ft 5 in (1.96 m) | 180 lb (82 kg) | So | Vanderbilt | Nashville, Tennessee |
| G | 12 | Geoff Sprouse | 6 ft 0 in (1.83 m) | 170 lb (77 kg) | So | Pembroke Pines | Pembroke Pines, Florida |
| F | 14 | Gibraltar Coleman | 6 ft 6 in (1.98 m) | 225 lb (102 kg) | Fr | Flint Hill | Lorton, Virginia |
| F | 15 | Matt Rogers | 6 ft 9 in (2.06 m) | 220 lb (100 kg) | Sr | St. Maria Goretti | Knoxville, Maryland |
| G | 20 | Adam Holod | 6 ft 2 in (1.88 m) | 175 lb (79 kg) | So | Santiago Canyon College | Saint Paul, Minnesota |
| F | 21 | Noah Jones | 6 ft 6 in (1.98 m) | 200 lb (91 kg) | So | Mount Saint Joseph | Baltimore, Maryland |
| C | 22 | Jermaine Ballisager Webb | 7 ft 0 in (2.13 m) | 250 lb (113 kg) | So | Montverde | Stjær, Denmark |
| C | 23 | Greg Jones | 6 ft 6 in (1.98 m) | 195 lb (88 kg) | Fr | Hayfield | Alexandria, Virginia |
| F | 31 | Matt Delaney | 6 ft 7 in (2.01 m) | 215 lb (98 kg) | Jr | St. Augustine Prep | Mantua, New Jersey |
| F | 33 | Matt Mayock | 6 ft 7 in (2.01 m) | 191 lb (87 kg) | Fr | Westtown School | Berwyn, Pennsylvania |
| F | 45 | Mason Whittaker | 6 ft 9 in (2.06 m) | 210 lb (95 kg) | Jr | Christ's College | Cust, New Zealand |

Head coach

- Duane Simpkins (Maryland)

Assistant coach(es)

- Nate Bollinger (Millersville)
- Jackie Manuel (North Carolina)
- Isaiah Tate (George Mason)

Legend

- (C) Team captain
- (S) Suspended
- (I) Ineligible
- (W) Walk-on
- Injured
- Current redshirt

Roster
Last update: November 18, 2023

== Schedule and results ==
| Date time, TV | Rank^{#} | Opponent^{#} | Result | Record | Site (attendance) city, state |
Exhibition
| October 31, 2023*; 7:00 p.m. | | at Howard | L 61–69 | – | Burr Gymnasium; Washington, D.C. |
Non-conference regular season
| November 6, 2023*; 7:30 p.m., FS1 | | at No. 22 Villanova | L 63–90 | 0–1 | Finneran Pavilion (6,501); Villanova, PA |
| November 9, 2023*; 7:00 p.m., FloHoops | | at William & Mary | L 56–75 | 0–2 | Kaplan Arena (2,716); Williamsburg, VA |
| November 13, 2023*; 7:00 p.m., ESPN+ | | Siena | W 78–58 | 1–2 | Bender Arena (1,114); Washington, D.C. |
| November 16, 2023*; 7:00 p.m., ESPN+ | | NJIT | W 87–73 | 2–2 | Bender Arena (909); Washington, D.C. |
| November 19, 2023*; 4:30 p.m., FS2 | | at Georgetown; Georgetown MTE | L 83–88 ^{OT} | 2–3 | Capital One Arena (4,755); Washington, D.C. |
| November 22, 2023*; 4:30 p.m., ESPN+ | | Mount St. Mary's; Georgetown MTE | W 68–65 | 3–3 | Bender Arena (584); Washington, D.C. |
| November 26, 2023*; 4:00 p.m., ESPN+ | | Hood College | W 103–74 | 4–3 | Bender Arena (554); Washington, D.C. |
| November 29, 2023*; 7:00 p.m., ESPN+ | | at Harvard | L 75–80 | 4–4 | Lavietes Pavilion (983); Boston, MA |
| December 2, 2023*; 2:00 p.m., ESPN+ | | Saint Francis (PA) | L 73–75 | 4–5 | Bender Arena (692); Washington, D.C. |
| December 6, 2023*; 7:00 p.m. | | at Saint Joseph's | L 53–69 | 4–6 | Hagan Arena (1,517); Philadelphia, PA |
| December 9, 2023*; 1:00 p.m., ESPN+ | | at VMI | W 77–69 | 5–6 | Cameron Hall (3,317); Lexington, VA |
| December 21, 2023*; 5:00 p.m., ACCN | | at Virginia Tech | L 55–77 | 5–7 | Cassell Coliseum (4,886); Blacksburg, VA |
| December 29, 2023*; 7:30 p.m., ESPN+ | | at UMBC | W 87–85 | 6–7 | Chesapeake Employers Insurance Arena (1,087); Catonsville, MD |
Patriot League regular season
| January 3, 2024; 7:00 p.m., ESPN+ | | Lehigh | W 75–66 | 7–7 (1–0) | Bender Arena (412); Washington, D.C. |
| January 6, 2024; 2:00 p.m., CBSSN | | at Bucknell | W 71–63 | 8–7 (2–0) | Sojka Pavilion (634); Lewisburg, PA |
| January 10, 2024; 7:00 p.m., ESPN+ | | at Boston University | L 68–72 | 8–8 (2–1) | Case Gym (454); Boston, MA |
| January 13, 2024; 4:00 p.m., ESPN+ | | Army | W 79–60 | 9–8 (3–1) | Bender Arena (2,426); Washington, D.C. |
| January 15, 2024; 7:00 p.m., CBSSN | | at Loyola (MD) | W 66–52 | 10–8 (4–1) | Reitz Arena (1,243); Baltimore, MD |
| January 20, 2023; 5:00 p.m., ESPN+ | | at Lehigh | L 68–70 | 10–9 (4–2) | Stabler Arena (688); Bethlehem, PA |
| January 24, 2024; 7:00 p.m., ESPN+ | | Holy Cross | W 84–65 | 11–9 (5–2) | Bender Arena (876); Washington, D.C. |
| January 27, 2024; 4:00 p.m., ESPN+ | | Colgate | L 54–73 | 11–10 (5–3) | Bender Arena (1,644); Washington, D.C. |
| January 31, 2024; 7:00 p.m., ESPN+ | | at Lafayette | W 69–66 | 12–10 (6–3) | Kirby Sports Center (1,289); Easton, PA |
| February 3, 2024; 4:00 p.m., ESPN+ | | Bucknell | W 75–66 ^{OT} | 13–10 (7–3) | Bender Arena (1,257); Washington, D.C. |
| February 7, 2024; 7:00 p.m., ESPN+ | | Loyola (MD) | L 43–44 | 13–11 (7–4) | Bender Arena (841); Washington, D.C. |
| February 10, 2024; 2:00 p.m., ESPN+ | | at Holy Cross | L 56–58 | 13–12 (7–5) | Hart Center (1,791); Worcester, MA |
| February 14, 2024; 7:00 p.m., ESPN+ | | at Navy | W 59–42 | 14–12 (8–5) | Alumni Hall (703); Annapolis, MD |
| February 17, 2024; 4:00 p.m., ESPN+ | | Lafayette | L 62–68 | 14–13 (8–6) | Bender Arena (1,087); Washington, D.C. |
| February 21, 2024; 4:00 p.m., ESPN+ | | Boston University | L 52–67 | 14–14 (8–7) | Bender Arena (691); Washington, D.C. |
| February 24, 2024; 2:00 p.m., ESPN+ | | at Colgate | W 66–64 | 15–14 (9–7) | Cotterell Court (1,158); Hamilton, NY |
| February 28, 2024; 6:00 pm, ESPN+ | | at Army | W 73–51 | 16–14 (10–7) | Christl Arena (277); West Point, NY |
| March 2, 2024; 2:00 p.m., ESPN+ | | Navy | L 65–71 | 16–15 (10–8) | Bender Arena (1,648); Washington, D.C. |
Patriot League tournament
| March 7, 2024; 7:00 p.m., ESPN+ | (4) | (5) Bucknell; Quarterfinals | L 57–80 | 16–16 | Bender Arena (1,172); Washington, D.C. |
*Non-conference game. ^{#}Rankings from AP poll. (#) Tournament seedings in parentheses. All times are in Eastern.
