= 2023–24 Lehigh Mountain Hawks men's basketball team =

American college basketball season

2023–24 Lehigh Mountain Hawks men's basketball
- Conference: Patriot League
- Record: 14–18 (9–9 Patriot)
- Head coach: Brett Reed (17th season)
- Associate head coach: Harry Morra
- Assistant coaches: Willie Jenkins; Sean Hoehn
- Home arena: Stabler Arena

2023–24 Patriot League men's basketball standings
	Conf.				Overall
Team	W		L	PCT	W		L	PCT
Colgate †	16	–	2	.889	25	–	10	.714
Boston University	10	–	8	.556	16	–	17	.485
Lafayette	10	–	8	.556	11	–	21	.344
American	10	–	8	.556	16	–	16	.500
Bucknell	10	–	8	.556	14	–	19	.424
Lehigh	9	–	9	.500	14	–	18	.438
Navy	8	–	10	.444	13	–	18	.419
Army	6	–	12	.333	10	–	22	.313
Holy Cross	6	–	12	.333	10	–	23	.303
Loyola	5	–	13	.278	7	–	25	.219
† 2024 Patriot League tournament winner

The 2023–24 Lehigh Mountain Hawks men's basketball team represented Lehigh University during the 2023–24 NCAA Division I men's basketball season. The Mountain Hawks, led by 17th-year head coach Brett Reed, played their home games at Stabler Arena in Bethlehem, Pennsylvania as members of the Patriot League. They finished the season 14–18, 9–9 in Patriot League play, to finish in sixth place.

== Previous season ==
The Mountain Hawks finished the 2022–23 season 16–14, 11–7 in Patriot League play, to finish in a tie for second place. As the No. 3 seed in the Patriot League tournament, they lost to Lafayette in the quarterfinals.

== Roster ==
2023–24 Lehigh Mountain Hawks men's basketball team
Players
Coaches

Pos.	#	Name	Height	Weight	Year	Previous school	Hometown
G	0	Cam Gillus	5 ft 11 in (1.8 m)	180 lb (82 kg)	Fr	Sidwell Friends School	Falls Church, VA
G	1	Nasir Whitlock	6 ft 2 in (1.88 m)	175 lb (79 kg)	Fr	DeLaSalle HS	Plymouth, MN
G	2	Ben Knostman	6 ft 5 in (1.96 m)	185 lb (84 kg)	Jr	Tippecanoe HS	Dayton, OH
G	4	Joshua Ingram	6 ft 4 in (1.93 m)	175 lb (79 kg)	Fr	St. Joseph HS	Metuchen, NJ
G	11	Brendan Reed	6 ft 0 in (1.83 m)	170 lb (77 kg)	So	Allentown Central Catholic HS	Bethlehem, PA
G	13	Keith Jr. Higgins	6 ft 4 in (1.93 m)	200 lb (91 kg)	Jr	Chaminade Prep	West Hills, CA
F	15	Jake Pike	6 ft 8 in (2.03 m)	210 lb (95 kg)	Fr	St. Thomas HS	Houston, TX
G	20	Jayshen Saigal	6 ft 2 in (1.88 m)	175 lb (79 kg)	Sr	Scarsdale HS	Scarsdale, NY
F	21	Burke Chebuhar	6 ft 8 in (2.03 m)	230 lb (104 kg)	Sr	The Walker School	Marietta, GA
G	22	Tyler Whitney-Sidney	6 ft 2 in (1.88 m)	180 lb (82 kg)	Jr	Brooks School	Somerville, MA
F	23	Bube Momah	6 ft 8 in (2.03 m)	240 lb (109 kg)	So	Brewster Academy	Unionville, CT
C	32	Henri Adiassa	6 ft 11 in (2.11 m)	240 lb (109 kg)	So	Crossroads School	Yaoundé, Cameroon
F/C	35	Dominic Parolin	6 ft 9 in (2.06 m)	245 lb (111 kg)	Sr	Centennial Secondary School	Coquitlam, BC
C	42	JT Tan	6 ft 8 in (2.03 m)	280 lb (127 kg)	Sr	Rolling Hills Prep	Redondo Beach, CA
C	44	Tommy Conniff	6 ft 11 in (2.11 m)	260 lb (118 kg)	So	Oratory Prep	Summit, NY
G	55	Jalin Sinclair	5 ft 10 in (1.78 m)	185 lb (84 kg)	Sr	Suffield Academy	Manhattan, NY

Head coach

- Brett Reed (Wayne State (MI))

Assistant coach(es)

- Harry Morra (DeSales)
- Willie Jenkins (Tennessee Tech)
- Sean Hoehn (Sacred Heart)

Legend

- (C) Team captain
- (S) Suspended
- (I) Ineligible
- (W) Walk-on
- Injured
- Current redshirt

Roster
Last update: December 5, 2023

== Schedule and results ==
Date time, TV	Rank^{#}	Opponent^{#}	Result	Record	Site (attendance) city, state
Non-conference regular season
November 6, 2023*; 7:30 p.m., ESPN+		Cornell	L 78–84	0–1	Stabler Arena (1,065); Bethlehem, PA
November 10, 2023*; 7:30 p.m., B1G+		at Penn State	L 65–74	0–2	Bryce Jordan Center (10,272); University Park, PA
November 12, 2023*; 2:00 p.m., ACCN		at No. 19 North Carolina	L 68–90	0–3	Dean Smith Center (18,608); Chapel Hill, NC
November 16, 2023*; 7:00 p.m., ESPN+		SUNY Oneonta	W 90–65	1–3	Stabler Arena (613); Bethlehem, PA
November 21, 2023*; 7:00 p.m., FloHoops/NBCSPHI		at Monmouth	L 79–88	1–4	OceanFirst Bank Center (1,310); West Long Branch, NJ
November 24, 2023*; 7:00 p.m., FS2		at Providence	L 64–78	1–5	Amica Mutual Pavilion (11,397); Providence, RI
November 29, 2023*; 7:00 p.m., ESPN+		Saint Francis (PA)	L 61–62	1–6	Stabler Arena (867); Bethlehem, PA
December 2, 2023*; 1:00 p.m., ESPN+		at UMBC	L 87–92	1–7	Chesapeake Employers Insurance Arena (1,325); Catonsville, MD
December 9, 2023*; 2:00 p.m., ESPN+		Cairn	W 88–33	2–7	Stabler Arena; Bethlehem, PA
December 21, 2023*; 6:00 p.m., ESPN+/ACCNX		at Boston College	L 69–85	2–8	Conte Forum (5,042); Chestnut Hill, MA
December 30, 2023*; 2:00 p.m., ESPN+		at Marist	W 65–58	3–8	McCann Arena (1,872); Poughkeepsie, NY
Patriot League regular season
January 3, 2024; 7:00 p.m., ESPN+		at American	L 66–75	3–9 (0–1)	Bender Arena (412); Washington, D.C.
January 6, 2024; 5:00 p.m., ESPN+		at Loyola (MD)	W 88–76	4–9 (1–1)	Reitz Arena (307); Baltimore, MD
January 10, 2024; 7:00 p.m., ESPN+		Bucknell	L 80–86	4–10 (1–2)	Stabler Arena (751); Bethlehem, PA
January 13, 2024; 5:00 p.m., ESPN+		Holy Cross	L 66–69 ^{OT}	4–11 (1–3)	Stabler Arena (728); Bethlehem, PA
January 17, 2024; 7:00 p.m., ESPN+		at Navy	L 69–71	4–12 (1–4)	Alumni Hall (943); Annapolis, MD
January 20, 2024; 5:00 p.m., ESPN+		American	W 70–68	5–12 (2–4)	Stabler Arena (688); Bethlehem, PA
January 22, 2024; 7:00 p.m., CBSSN		at Colgate	L 57–60	5–13 (2–5)	Cotterell Court (957); Hamilton, NY
January 27, 2024; 12:00 p.m., CBSSN		at Holy Cross	W 78–72	6–13 (3–5)	Hart Center (1,063); Worcester, MA
January 31, 2024; 7:00 p.m., ESPN+		Navy	W 77–65	7–13 (4–5)	Stabler Arena (1,153); Bethlehem, PA
February 3, 2024; 1:00 p.m., ESPN+		at Boston University	L 71–72	7–14 (4–6)	Case Gym (1,002); Boston, MA
February 7, 2024; 7:00 p.m., ESPN+		Army	L 57–68	7–15 (4–7)	Stabler Arena (915); Bethlehem, PA
February 10, 2024; 7:00 p.m., ESPN+		Lafayette	W 94–90 ^{OT}	8–15 (5–7)	Stabler Arena (1,962); Bethlehem, PA
February 12, 2024; 7:00 p.m., CBSSN		at Bucknell	W 71–63 ^{OT}	9–15 (6–7)	Sojka Pavilion (1,398); Lewisburg, PA
February 17, 2024; 2:00 p.m., ESPN+		Loyola (MD)	W 75–70	10–15 (7–7)	Stabler Arena (1,024); Bethlehem, PA
February 21, 2024; 6:00 p.m., ESPN+		at Army	W 85–54	11–15 (8–7)	Christl Arena (731); West Point, NY
February 24, 2024; 2:00 p.m., ESPN+		at Lafayette	W 71–63	12–15 (9–7)	Kirby Sports Center (2,231); Easton, PA
February 28, 2024; 6:00 p.m., ESPN+		Boston University	L 62–64 ^{OT}	12–16 (9–8)	Stabler Arena (983); Bethlehem, PA
March 2, 2024; 2:00 p.m., ESPN+		Colgate	L 60–63	12–17 (9–9)	Stabler Arena (1,339); Bethlehem, PA
Patriot League tournament
March 7, 2024; 7:00 p.m., ESPN+	(6)	at (3) Lafayette; Quarterfinals	W 76–61	13–17	Kirby Sports Center (1,776); Easton, PA
March 10, 2024; 4:00 p.m., CBSSN	(6)	at (2) Boston University; Semifinals	W 84–79 ^{OT}	14–17	Case Gym (923); Boston, MA
March 13, 2024; 7:00 p.m., CBSSN	(6)	at (1) Colgate; Championship	L 55–74	14–18	Cotterell Court (1,533); Hamilton, NY
*Non-conference game. ^{#}Rankings from AP poll. (#) Tournament seedings in parentheses. All times are in Eastern.
