= Kevin Kuwik =

American basketball coach (born 1974)

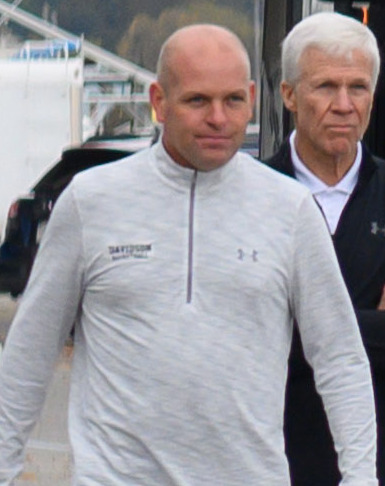
- Kuwik in 2019

Current position
- Title: Head coach
- Team: Army
- Conference: Patriot
- Record: 40–63 (.388)

Biographical details
- Born: April 20, 1974 (age 52); Lackawanna, New York, U.S.
- Education: Notre Dame ('96)

Coaching career (HC unless noted)
- 1998–2000: Christian Brothers (assistant)
- 2000–2001: Saint Michael's (assistant)
- 2001–2008: Ohio (assistant)
- 2011–2017: Dayton (assistant)
- 2018–2022: Davidson (assistant)
- 2022–2023: Butler (assistant)
- 2023–present: Army

Administrative career (AD unless noted)
- 2008–2009: Butler (Director of Operations)
- 2009–2011: Ohio State (Video Coordinator)
- 2017–2018: Davidson (Director of Operations)

Head coaching record
- Overall: 40–63 (.388)

Kevin Kuwik

Military service
- Allegiance: United States
- Branch/service: United States Army
- Years of service: 1996–2006
- Rank: Captain
- Battles/wars: Iraq War
- Awards: Bronze Star

Kevin Kuwik (born April 20, 1974) is an American college basketball coach and current head men's basketball coach at the United States Military Academy.

== Coaching career ==
Kuwik's coaching career began at Christian Brothers in Tennessee where he served as an assistant for two seasons before moving to Saint Michael's in Vermont for a single year before joining the staff of Tim O'Shea at Ohio from 2001 to 2008. He'd then spend one season as the director of basketball operations under Brad Stevens at Butler, then taking a video coordinator role under Thad Matta at Ohio State for two seasons. In 2011, Kuwik would follow his fellow Ohio State staffer Archie Miller to become an assistant coach at Dayton, a position he held until 2017.

In 2017, Kuwik would become an assistant under Bob McKillop at Davidson until 2022, when he rejoined Matta at Butler.

As an assistant coach, Kuwik has helped schools achieve 10 NCAA tournaments, including 4 appearances in the Round of 32, three appearances in the Sweet 16 and one Elite 8 appearance. He also helped Davidson to two NIT appearances and Dayton to one.

He was named the head coach at Army in 2023, following the departure of Jimmy Allen.

== Military career ==
Kuwik is a 1996 graduate of Notre Dame ROTC, where he was a Distinguished Military Graduate. He served 10 years in the United States Army, while simultaneously coaching, earning a bronze star while serving in Iraq.

== Head coaching record ==
Record table
Season	Team	Overall	Conference	Standing	Postseason
Army Black Knights (Patriot League) (2023–present)
2023–24	Army	10–22	6–12	T–8th	
2024–25	Army	17–16	10–8	T–3rd	CBI Quarterfinals
2025–26	Army	11–21	5–13	9th	
2026–27	Army	2–4	0–0		
Army:		40–63 (.388)	21–33 (.389)		
Total:		40–63 (.388)			
National champion Postseason invitational champion Conference regular season champion Conference regular season and conference tournament champion Division regular season champion Division regular season and conference tournament champion Conference tournament champion
