= Gary Winton =

American former basketball player (born c. 1957)

Personal information
- Born: c. 1957
- Listed height: 6 ft 5 in (1.96 m)

Career information
- High school: Albert P. Brewer (Somerville, Alabama)
- College: Army (1974–1978)
- NBA draft: 1978: 10th round, 194th overall pick
- Drafted by: Cleveland Cavaliers
- Position: Forward

Career highlights
- 2× AP honorable mention All-American (1977, 1978)
- Stats at Basketball Reference

Gary Joseph Winton (born c. 1957) is an American former basketball player best known for his collegiate career at the United States Military Academy ("Army") between 1974 and 1978. A 6'5" forward from Somerville, Alabama, Winton scored a then-school record 2,296 points (later surpassed by Kevin Houston) and grabbed a still-standing school record 1,168 rebounds. On 14 occasions he scored 30 or more points and recorded 15+ rebounds 17 times. In his junior and senior seasons Winton was an Honorable Mention All-American while playing for Naismith Memorial Basketball Hall of Fame coach Mike Krzyzewski.

The National Basketball Association's Cleveland Cavaliers selected him in the 1978 NBA draft, but due to a five-year commitment to serve in the United States Army after graduation, he never played in the league. After graduation, he did play on the pre-Olympic traveling USA Basketball Team. In 1979, the men's basketball team participated in the Soviet Union's Spartakiad, an international sports event that the Soviet Union attempted to use to both oppose and supplement the Olympics. Winton ultimately never made the official Olympic roster, however.

In 1990, he served as Army's head softball coach for one season. Fifteen years later he was inducted in the Army Sports Hall of Fame as part of their 14-person induction class in 2005.

== Head coaching record ==
=== Softball ===
Record table
Season	Team	Overall	Conference	Standing	Postseason
Army Cadets (Independent) (1990)
1990	Army	29–10			
Army:		29–10 (.744)			
Total:		29–10 (.744)			
National champion Postseason invitational champion Conference regular season champion Conference regular season and conference tournament champion Division regular season champion Division regular season and conference tournament champion Conference tournament champion

== See also ==
- List of NCAA Division I men's basketball players with 2000 points and 1000 rebounds
