= 2023–24 Army Black Knights men's basketball team =

American college basketball season

2023–24 Army Black Knights men's basketball
- Conference: Patriot League
- Record: 10–22 (6–12 Patriot)
- Head coach: Kevin Kuwik (1st season)
- Assistant coaches: Andrew Chrabascz; Carson Cunningham; Jarren Dyson; Darius Stokes; Nick Thorsen
- Home arena: Christl Arena

2023–24 Patriot League men's basketball standings
	Conf.				Overall
Team	W		L	PCT	W		L	PCT
Colgate †	16	–	2	.889	25	–	10	.714
Boston University	10	–	8	.556	16	–	17	.485
Lafayette	10	–	8	.556	11	–	21	.344
American	10	–	8	.556	16	–	16	.500
Bucknell	10	–	8	.556	14	–	19	.424
Lehigh	9	–	9	.500	14	–	18	.438
Navy	8	–	10	.444	13	–	18	.419
Army	6	–	12	.333	10	–	22	.313
Holy Cross	6	–	12	.333	10	–	23	.303
Loyola	5	–	13	.278	7	–	25	.219
† 2024 Patriot League tournament winner

The 2023–24 Army Black Knights men's basketball team represented the United States Military Academy during the 2023–24 NCAA Division I men's basketball season. The Black Knights, led by first-year head coach Kevin Kuwik, played their home games at Christl Arena in West Point, New York as members of the Patriot League. They finished the season 10–21, 6–12 in Patriot League play to tie for eighth place. They were defeated by Holy Cross in the first round of the Patriot League tournament.

== Previous season ==
The Black Knights finished the 2022–23 season 17–16, 10–8 in Patriot League play to finish in fourth place. They defeated Boston University in overtime in the quarterfinals of the Patriot League tournament, before falling to top seed and eventual tournament champions Colgate in the semifinals.

On March 10, 2023, the school fired head coach Jimmy Allen after seven years as head coach. On March 29, the school named Butler assistant coach Kevin Kuwik as the team's new head coach.

== Roster ==
2023–24 Army Black Knights men's basketball team
Players
Coaches

Pos.	#	Name	Height	Weight	Year	Previous school	Hometown
G	0	Isaiah Caldwell	6 ft 4 in (1.93 m)	162 lb (73 kg)	Jr	USMAPS	Columbia, SC
G	2	Ryan Curry	6 ft 0 in (1.83 m)	174 lb (79 kg)	Fr	Montgomery HS	Montgomery, NJ
G	3	Jaden Ellis	6 ft 0 in (1.83 m)	166 lb (75 kg)	So	Page HS	Greensboro, NC
F	4	Josh Scovens	6 ft 4 in (1.93 m)	214 lb (97 kg)	Fr	Page HS	Greensboro, NC
F	5	Griff Lamb	6 ft 8 in (2.03 m)	217 lb (98 kg)	Jr	Gilbert HS	Holbrook, AZ
G	10	Zach Lezanic	6 ft 0 in (1.83 m)	175 lb (79 kg)	Sr	Conestoga HS	Berwyn, PA
G	12	Blane St. Clair	6 ft 5 in (1.96 m)	213 lb (97 kg)	Jr	Davidson Day School	Boone, NC
G	13	Kendall Hailey	6 ft 3 in (1.91 m)	170 lb (77 kg)	Fr	Notre Dame HS	Los Angeles, CA
G	14	Zach Rocco	6 ft 1 in (1.85 m)	182 lb (83 kg)	Sr	Penn-Trafford HS	Export, PA
F	15	Jorn Everson	6 ft 8 in (2.03 m)	214 lb (97 kg)	So	Northfield Mount Hermon	Williston, ND
G	21	Jackson Mayo	6 ft 0 in (1.83 m)	185 lb (84 kg)	So	Mililani HS	Mililani, HI
G	22	Kwabena Davis	6 ft 3 in (1.91 m)	181 lb (82 kg)	Sr	Byron P. Steele HS	San Antonio, TX
G	23	Dylan Blair	5 ft 9 in (1.75 m)	163 lb (74 kg)	Fr	Downingtown West HS	Downingtown, PA
G	24	Jared Cross	6 ft 3 in (1.91 m)	196 lb (89 kg)	Sr	St. Stephen's & St. Agnes	Leesburg, VA
F	25	Chanse Perkins	6 ft 4 in (1.93 m)	227 lb (103 kg)	So	Woodlands Christian Academy	Houston, TX
G	31	Blake Barker	6 ft 2 in (1.88 m)	189 lb (86 kg)	Jr	Columbus North HS	Columbus, IN
F	32	Tate Laczkowski	6 ft 8 in (2.03 m)	198 lb (90 kg)	Fr	Wilbraham & Monson Academy	Dallas, TX
F	33	JT Dougherty	6 ft 9 in (2.06 m)	222 lb (101 kg)	Jr	River Falls HS	River Falls, WI
F	34	Charlie Peterson	6 ft 9 in (2.06 m)	244 lb (111 kg)	Sr	North Central HS	Indianapolis, IN
G	35	TJ Small	6 ft 2 in (1.88 m)	195 lb (88 kg)	Jr	Brother Martin HS	Kenner, LA
F	41	Nolan Naess	6 ft 8 in (2.03 m)	197 lb (89 kg)	Jr	Laguna Beach HS	Laguna Beach, CA
G	42	Luke Benson	5 ft 11 in (1.8 m)	181 lb (82 kg)	Jr	Marist School	Atlanta, GA
F	44	Matt Dove	6 ft 10 in (2.08 m)	240 lb (109 kg)	Sr	Princeton Community HS	Princeton, IN
F	54	Abe Johnson	6 ft 8 in (2.03 m)	243 lb (110 kg)	Sr	Hellgate HS	Missoula, MT
F	55	AJ Allenspach	6 ft 8 in (2.03 m)	225 lb (102 kg)	Jr	Lake Norman Christian School	Simpsonville, SC

Head coach

- Kevin Kuwik (Notre Dame)

Assistant coach(es)

- Andrew Chrabascz (Butler)
- Carson Cunningham (Purdue)
- Jarren Dyson (Emory & Henry)
- Darius Stokes (Iowa)
- Nick Thorsen (Penn State Behrend)

Legend

- (C) Team captain
- (S) Suspended
- (I) Ineligible
- (W) Walk-on
- Injured
- Current redshirt

Roster
Last update: November 3, 2023

== Schedule and results ==
Date time, TV	Rank^{#}	Opponent^{#}	Result	Record	Site (attendance) city, state
Non-conference regular season
November 6, 2023*; 8:00 pm, ESPN+		Marist	L 55–71	0–1	Christl Arena (770); West Point, NY
November 9, 2023*; 7:00 pm		at Stonehill	L 44–57	0–2	Merkert Gymnasium (460); Easton, MA
November 12, 2023*; 7:00 pm, BTN		at Indiana	L 64–72	0–3	Simon Skjodt Assembly Hall (17,222); Bloomington, IN
November 17, 2023*; 5:00 pm, ESPN+		Quinnipiac; Doc Sauers Classic	L 58–67	0–4	Christl Arena (934); West Point, NY
November 21, 2023*; 7:00 pm, ESPN+		at Albany; Doc Sauers Classic	L 59–62	0–5	Cool Insuring Arena (2,011); Glens Falls, NY
November 25, 2023*; 2:00 pm, ESPN+		at Binghamton	L 68–75	0–6	Binghamton University Events Center (1,508); Vestal, NY
November 29, 2023*; 4:00 pm, ESPN+		Central Connecticut	L 51–79	0–7	Christl Arena (350); West Point, NY
December 1, 2023*; 6:00 pm, ESPN+		SUNY Maritime	W 74–39	1–7	Christl Arena (856); West Point, NY
December 5, 2023*; 6:00 pm, ESPN+		Le Moyne	W 68–51	2–7	Christl Arena (428); West Point, NY
December 8, 2023*; 7:00 pm, ESPN+		at Harvard	L 64–70	2–8	Lavietes Pavilion (1,450); Cambridge, MA
December 17, 2023*; 1:00 pm, ESPN+		Stony Brook	L 74–78 ^{OT}	2–9	Christl Arena (854); West Point, NY
December 21, 2023*; 8:00 pm, ESPN+		at UTSA	W 63–53	3–9	Convocation Center (1,193); San Antonio, TX
December 30, 2023*; 2:00 pm, ESPN+		Merchant Marine	W 58–50	4–9	Christl Arena (1,113); West Point, NY
Patriot League regular season
January 3, 2024; 7:00 pm, ESPN+		at Lafayette	L 47–52	4–10 (0–1)	Kirby Sports Center (1,149); Easton, PA
January 6, 2024; 1:00 pm, ESPN+		Holy Cross	W 70–57	5–10 (1–1)	Christl Arena (500); West Point, NY
January 10, 2024; 6:00 pm, ESPN+		Loyola (MD)	L 65–71	5–11 (1–2)	Christl Arena (604); West Point, NY
January 13, 2024; 4:00 pm, ESPN+		at American	L 60–79	5–12 (1–3)	Bender Arena (2,426); Washington, D.C.
January 17, 2024; 6:00 pm, ESPN+		Colgate	L 56–64	5–13 (1–4)	Christl Arena (532); West Point, NY
January 20, 2024; 1:30 pm, CBSSN		at Navy	L 53–57	5–14 (1–5)	Alumni Hall (5,255); Annapolis, MD
January 24, 2024; 7:00 pm, ESPN+		at Boston University	W 69–59	6–14 (2–5)	Case Gym (668); Boston, MA
January 27, 2024; 1:00 pm, ESPN+		Bucknell	L 56–66	6–15 (2–6)	Christl Arena (1,200); West Point, NY
January 31, 2024; 7:00 pm, ESPN+		at Colgate	L 55–74	6–16 (2–7)	Cotterell Court (747); Hamilton, NY
February 3, 2024; 6:00 pm, ESPN+		Lafayette	L 56–64 ^{OT}	6–17 (2–8)	Christl Arena (913); West Point, NY
February 7, 2024; 7:00 pm, ESPN+		at Lehigh	W 68–57	7–17 (3–8)	Stabler Arena (915); Bethlehem, PA
February 10, 2024; 1:30 pm, ESPN+		Navy	W 69–67 ^{OT}	8–17 (4–8)	Christl Arena (4,922); West Point, NY
February 14, 2024; 6:00 pm, ESPN+		Boston University	W 65–50	9–17 (5–8)	Christl Arena (549); West Point, NY
February 17, 2024; 2:00 pm, ESPN+		at Holy Cross	W 59–53	10–17 (6–8)	Hart Center (1,717); Worcester, MA
February 21, 2024; 6:00 pm, ESPN+		Lehigh	L 54–85	10–18 (6–9)	Christl Arena (731); West Point, NY
February 25, 2024; 2:00 pm, ESPN+		at Bucknell	L 41–54	10–19 (6–10)	Sojka Pavilion (1,207); Lewisburg, PA
February 28, 2024; 6:00 pm, ESPN+		American	L 51–73	10–20 (6–11)	Christl Arena (277); West Point, NY
March 2, 2024; 5:00 pm, ESPN+		at Loyola (MD)	L 68–69	10–21 (6–12)	Reitz Arena (943); Baltimore, MD
Patriot League tournament
March 5, 2024; 6:00 pm, ESPN+	(8)	(9) Holy Cross; First Round	L 68–84	10–22	Christl Arena (170); West Point, NY
*Non-conference game. ^{#}Rankings from AP Poll. (#) Tournament seedings in parentheses. All times are in Eastern.
