= 2023–24 Holy Cross Crusaders men's basketball team =

American college basketball season

2023–24 Holy Cross Crusaders men's basketball
- Conference: Patriot League
- Record: 10–23 (6–12 Patriot)
- Head coach: Dave Paulsen (1st season)
- Associate head coach: Bryson Johnson
- Assistant coaches: R.J. Evans; Ted Rawlings
- Home arena: Hart Center

2023–24 Patriot League men's basketball standings
	Conf.				Overall
Team	W		L	PCT	W		L	PCT
Colgate †	16	–	2	.889	25	–	10	.714
Boston University	10	–	8	.556	16	–	17	.485
Lafayette	10	–	8	.556	11	–	21	.344
American	10	–	8	.556	16	–	16	.500
Bucknell	10	–	8	.556	14	–	19	.424
Lehigh	9	–	9	.500	14	–	18	.438
Navy	8	–	10	.444	13	–	18	.419
Army	6	–	12	.333	10	–	22	.313
Holy Cross	6	–	12	.333	10	–	23	.303
Loyola	5	–	13	.278	7	–	25	.219
† 2024 Patriot League tournament winner

The 2023–24 Holy Cross Crusaders men's basketball team represented the College of the Holy Cross during the 2023–24 NCAA Division I men's basketball season. The Crusaders, led by first-year head coach Dave Paulsen, played their home games at the Hart Center located in Worcester, Massachusetts as members of the Patriot League.

== Previous season ==
The Crusaders finished the 2022–23 season 10–22, 7–11 in Patriot League play to finish in a four-way tie for sixth place. As the No. 9 seed in the Patriot League tournament, they lost to Loyola (MD) in the first round.

On March 10, 2023, the school fired head coach Brett Nelson. On March 28, the school named Fordham assistant coach Dave Paulsen the team's new head coach.

== Roster ==
2023–24 Holy Cross Crusaders men's basketball team
Players
Coaches

Pos.	#	Name	Height	Weight	Year	Previous school	Hometown
G	0	Bo Montgomery	6 ft 5 in (1.96 m)	205 lb (93 kg)	Sr	Lausanne Collegiate School	Memphis, Tennessee
G	1	Joe Octave	6 ft 4 in (1.93 m)	205 lb (93 kg)	Sr	Mary Star of the Sea High School	Gardena, California
G	2	DeAndre Williams	6 ft 3 in (1.91 m)	185 lb (84 kg)	Fr	St. Benedict's Prep	Beacon, New York
G	3	Ben Capron	6 ft 0 in (1.83 m)	165 lb (75 kg)	So	Phillipsburg High School	Phillipsburg, New Jersey
G	4	Kahlil Singleton	6 ft 3 in (1.91 m)	190 lb (86 kg)	Fr	Scotland Campus	Vancouver, Washington
G	5	Jaden Kirkwood	6 ft 5 in (1.96 m)	215 lb (98 kg)	So	IMG Academy	Ottawa, Ontario
G	10	Jade Tse	6 ft 1 in (1.85 m)	185 lb (84 kg)	Sr	Deerfield Academy	Queens, New York
G	11	Will Batchelder	6 ft 1 in (1.85 m)	175 lb (79 kg)	So	The Governor's Academy	Newburyport, Massachusetts
G	12	Declan McIntyre	6 ft 2 in (1.88 m)	185 lb (84 kg)	Fr	Worcester Academy	White Plains, New York
G	13	A.J. Wills	6 ft 2 in (1.88 m)	160 lb (73 kg)	Fr	Shining Stars Sports Academy	Richmond, Virginia
G/F	30	Joe Nugent	6 ft 6 in (1.98 m)	220 lb (100 kg)	Fr	Tabor Academy	Berkley, Massachusetts
F	32	Michael Rabinovich	6 ft 10 in (2.08 m)	215 lb (98 kg)	Sr	Worcester Academy	Hopkinton, Massachusetts
F	33	Caleb Kenney	6 ft 6 in (1.98 m)	220 lb (100 kg)	Jr	Douglas Freeman High School	Richmond, Virginia
F	34	Declan Ryan	6 ft 8 in (2.03 m)	260 lb (118 kg)	Fr	Worcester Academy	Buffalo, New York
F	44	Louth-M Coulibaly	6 ft 9 in (2.06 m)	235 lb (107 kg)	Sr	Canada Topflight Academy	Ottawa, Ontario

Head coach

- Dave Paulsen (Williams)

Assistant coach(es)

- Bryson Johnson (Bucknell)
- R.J. Evans (Connecticut)
- Ted Rawlings (Penn)

Legend

- (C) Team captain
- (S) Suspended
- (I) Ineligible
- (W) Walk-on
- Injured
- Current redshirt

Roster
Last update: December 5, 2023

== Schedule and results ==
Date time, TV	Rank^{#}	Opponent^{#}	Result	Record	Site (attendance) city, state
Non-conference regular season
November 6, 2023*; 7:00 pm, ESPN+		at Siena	L 71–73	0–1	MVP Arena (4,474); Albany, NY
November 11, 2023*; 8:00 pm, FS2		at Georgetown	W 68–67	1–1	Capital One Arena (7,621); Washington, D.C.
November 14, 2023*; 7:00 pm, ESPN+		Sacred Heart	L 77–84	1–2	Hart Center (1,176); Worcester, MA
November 17, 2023*; 5:00 pm, ESPN+		vs. Winthrop; Winthrop Invitational	L 51–89	1–3	Rock Hill Sports & Event Center (909); Rock Hill, SC
November 18, 2023*; 7:30 pm, ESPN+		vs. Elon; Winthrop Invitational	L 69–83	1–4	Rock Hill Sports & Event Center (711); Rock Hill, SC
November 19, 2023*; 12:00 pm, ESPN+		vs. IUPUI; Winthrop Invitational	W 74–61	2–4	Rock Hill Sports & Event Center (944); Rock Hill, SC
November 25, 2023*; 7:00 pm, FS2		at St. John's	L 45–91	2–5	Carnesecca Arena (5,602); Queens, NY
November 29, 2023*; 7:00 pm, ESPN+		Maine	L 57–72	2–6	Hart Center (777); Worcester, MA
December 2, 2023*; 1:00 pm, NEC Front Row		at Central Connecticut	L 67–78	2–7	William H. Detrick Gymnasium (1,021); New Britain, CT
December 8, 2023*; 7:00 pm, ESPN+/ACCNX		at Boston College	L 64–95	2–8	Conte Forum (4,866); Chestnut Hill, MA
December 18, 2023*; 7:00 pm, ESPN+		Quinnipiac	L 57–77	2–9	Hart Center (654); Worcester, MA
December 21, 2023*; 2:00 pm, ESPN+		at Harvard	L 72–74	2–10	Lavietes Pavilion (1,124); Cambridge, MA
December 29, 2023*; 2:00 pm, ESPN+		Elms	W 88–60	3–10	Hart Center (993); Worcester, MA
Patriot League regular season
January 3, 2024; 7:00 pm, ESPN+		at Bucknell	L 58–70	3–11 (0–1)	Sojka Pavilion (824); Lewisburg, PA
January 6, 2024; 1:00 pm, ESPN+		at Army	L 57–70	3–12 (0–2)	Christl Arena (500); West Point, NY
January 10, 2024; 7:00 pm, ESPN+		Navy	L 70–80	3–13 (0–3)	Hart Center (646); Worcester, MA
January 13, 2024; 5:00 pm, ESPN+		at Lehigh	W 69–66 ^{OT}	4–13 (1–3)	Stabler Arena (728); Bethlehem, PA
January 17, 2024; 7:00 pm, ESPN+		Lafayette	L 68–72	4–14 (1–4)	Hart Center (692); Worcester, MA
January 20, 2024; 2:00 pm, ESPN+		Loyola (MD)	W 86–78	5–14 (2–4)	Hart Center (876); Worcester, MA
January 24, 2024; 7:00 pm, ESPN+		at American	L 65–84	5–15 (2–5)	Bender Arena (876); Washington, D.C.
January 27, 2024; 12:00 pm, CBSSN		Lehigh	L 72–78	5–16 (2–6)	Hart Center (1,063); Worcester, MA
January 29, 2024; 7:00 pm, CBSSN		Boston University; Turnpike Trophy	W 65–63	6–16 (3–6)	Hart Center (2,364); Worcester, MA
February 3, 2024; 5:00 pm, ESPN+		at Loyola (MD)	W 70–67	7–16 (4–6)	Reitz Arena (480); Baltimore, MD
February 7, 2024; 7:00 pm, ESPN+		at Lafayette	L 59–75	7–17 (4–7)	Kirby Sports Center (1,241); Easton, PA
February 10, 2024; 2:00 pm, ESPN+		American	W 58–56	8–17 (5–7)	Hart Center (1,791); Worcester, MA
February 14, 2024; 7:00 pm, ESPN+		at Colgate	L 55–85	8–18 (5–8)	Cotterell Court (546); Hamilton, NY
February 17, 2024; 2:00 pm, ESPN+		Army	L 53–59	8–19 (5–9)	Hart Center (1,717); Worcester, MA
February 21, 2024; 7:00 pm, ESPN+		Bucknell	W 73–59	9–19 (6–9)	Hart Center (1,469); Worcester, MA
February 25, 2024; 2:00 pm, ESPN+		at Navy	L 66–76	9–20 (6–10)	Alumni Hall (2,537); Annapolis, MD
February 28, 2024; 7:00 pm, ESPN+		Colgate	L 58–77	9–21 (6–11)	Hart Center (1,077); Worcester, MA
March 2, 2024; 12:00 pm, ESPN+		at Boston University; Turnpike Trophy	L 84–94	9–22 (6–12)	Case Gym; Boston, MA
Patriot League tournament
March 5, 2024; 6:00 pm, ESPN+	(9)	at (8) Army; First round	W 84–68	10–22	Christl Arena (170); West Point, NY
March 7, 2024; 7:00 pm, ESPN+	(9)	at (1) Colgate; Quarterfinals	L 64–81	10–23	Cotterell Court (1,405); Hamilton, NY
*Non-conference game. ^{#}Rankings from AP Poll. (#) Tournament seedings in parentheses. All times are in Eastern.
