= Bill Hannon =

American basketball player

Personal information
- Born: August 29, 1932 (age 94)
- Listed height: 6 ft 3 in (1.91 m)

Career information
- High school: Westville (Westville, Indiana)
- College: Army (1951–1954)
- NBA draft: 1954: undrafted
- Position: Center

Career highlights
- NCAA rebounding leader (1952)

Clarence William Hannon (born August 29, 1932) was an American college basketball player for Army from 1951 to 1954.

== College career ==
Hannon played basketball at West Point during his sophomore, junior, and senior years. In his sophomore year of 1951–52, he set an Army record with 277 points, beating Dale Hall's mark of 273. Hannon also led the nation in rebounding with 20.9 per game.

In his senior year, Hannon scored 44 points in a game against New Mexico, which set a school record. He also pulled down 27 rebounds against Pittsburgh on February 22, 1954; this is still a school record.

Overall, Hannon led Army in scoring and rebounding each of his three years. He finished his college career with 1,155 points and 1,101 rebounds, and both totals were school records at that time. His 19.0 career rebounding average in 58 games is still the highest in Army history.

== Later life ==
Hannon served in the U.S. Army and retired as a colonel. In 2015, he was inducted into the Army Sports Hall of Fame.
