= 2024 Patriot League men's basketball tournament =

Conference postseason tournament

- Classification: Division I
- Season: 2023–24
- Teams: 10
- Site: Campus sites
- Champions: Colgate (7th title)
- Winning coach: Matt Langel (5th title)
- Attendance: 9,383 (total); 1,533 (championship)
- Television: ESPN+, CBSSN

2023–24 Patriot League men's basketball standings
	Conf.				Overall
Team	W		L	PCT	W		L	PCT
Colgate †	16	–	2	.889	25	–	10	.714
Boston University	10	–	8	.556	16	–	17	.485
Lafayette	10	–	8	.556	11	–	21	.344
American	10	–	8	.556	16	–	16	.500
Bucknell	10	–	8	.556	14	–	19	.424
Lehigh	9	–	9	.500	14	–	18	.438
Navy	8	–	10	.444	13	–	18	.419
Army	6	–	12	.333	10	–	22	.313
Holy Cross	6	–	12	.333	10	–	23	.303
Loyola	5	–	13	.278	7	–	25	.219
† 2024 Patriot League tournament winner

The 2024 Patriot League Men's Basketball Tournament was the conference postseason tournament for the Patriot League. The tournament was held March 5–13, 2024 at campus sites of the higher seeds. The winner received the conference's automatic bid to the NCAA tournament.

== Seeds ==
All ten teams in the conference qualified for the tournament. The teams were seeded by record in conference, with a tiebreaker system to seed teams with identical conference records.

The first tiebreaker is the head-to-head records of the tied teams. If teams remain tied, the tied teams' records against the highest seeded Patriot League team not involved in the tie are compared, provided each of the tied teams played that team at least once. If the tied teams have identical winning percentages against the highest seeded team, the process works its way down the standings. If the teams remain tied, the NCAA NET rankings available on day following the conclusion of Patriot League regular-season play are used. In the event tied teams have identical NET rankings, the tied teams' winning percentages against non-Patriot League common opponents are compared. If the tie involves three or more teams, and one or more teams are superior or inferior to the others after any step, but two or more teams remain tied, the multiple-team tiebreaker process continues and does not revert to a new two-team or multiple-team tiebreaker.

Once a team is eliminated from a multiple-team tiebreaker, either by demonstrating superiority or inferiority to the remaining tied teams, it is treated as if it had not been involved in the initial tie for the purposes of applying the remaining steps in continuing the tiebreaker procedure, and such team is seeded according to the tiebreaker result. This point was relevant in applying the tiebreaker procedure to break the four-way tie for second place in 2024. Boston University had a 4–2 record in head-to-head games against American, Bucknell and Lafayette, earning the no. 2 seed. Bucknell had a 2–4 head-to-head record, causing them to be seeded no. 5. American and Lafayette each had 3–3 head-to-head records, leaving them in a tie for the no. 3 seed. American and Lafayette each split their season series with no. 1 seed Colgate. Lafayette earned the no. 3 seed by virtue of their 1–1 record versus no. 2 seed Boston University, while American was 0–2 against the Terriers.

If teams involved in the initial tie were ignored in applying subsequent tiebreaker steps, American would have been the no. 3 seed, based on their 1–1 record against Lehigh, superior to Lafayette, who were 0–2 versus the Mountain Hawks.

If Boston University and Bucknell were treated as a group of tied teams, since they both finished 10–8 and tied for second place, in applying subsequent steps of the tiebreaker, the tie would not have been resolved at this step, since American and Lafayette each had 2–2 records versus Boston University and Bucknell. The procedure would have continued to the next step, the teams' records against no. 6 seed Lehigh, which American would have won.

Seed	School	Conference	Tiebreaker 1	Tiebreaker 2
1	Colgate	16–2		
2	Boston University	10–8	4–2 vs. Lafayette/American/Bucknell	
3	Lafayette	10–8	3–3 vs. Boston University/American/Bucknell	1–1 vs. Boston University
4	American	10–8	3–3 vs. Boston University/Lafayette/Bucknell	0–2 vs. Boston University
5	Bucknell	10–8	2–4 vs. Boston University/Lafayette/American	
6	Lehigh	9–9		
7	Navy	8–10		
8	Army	6–12	2–0 vs. Holy Cross	
9	Holy Cross	6–12	0–2 vs. Army	
10	Loyola	5–13		

== Schedule ==
Game	Time	Matchup	Score	Television	Attendance
First round – Tuesday, March 5
1	7:00 pm	No. 7 Navy vs. No. 10 Loyola	64–48	ESPN+	583
2	6:00 pm	No. 8 Army vs No. 9 Holy Cross	68–84	ESPN+	170
Quarterfinals – Thursday, March 7
3	7:00 pm	No. 1 Colgate vs. No. 9 Holy Cross	81–64	ESPN+	1,405
4	7:00 pm	No. 2 Boston University vs. No. 7 Navy	70–61	ESPN+	715
5	7:00 pm	No. 3 Lafayette vs. No. 6 Lehigh	61–76	ESPN+	1,776
6	7:00 pm	No. 4 American vs. No. 5 Bucknell	57–80	ESPN+	1,172
Semifinals – Sunday, March 10
7	2:00 pm	No. 1 Colgate vs. No. 5 Bucknell	68–65	CBSSN	1,106
8	4:00 pm	No. 2 Boston University vs. No. 6 Lehigh	79–84^{OT}	CBSSN	923
Championship – Wednesday, March 13
9	7:00 pm	No. 1 Colgate vs. No. 6 Lehigh	74–55	CBSSN	1,533
Game times in ET. Rankings denote tournament seeding. All games hosted by higher-seeded team.

== Bracket ==
First round Tuesday, March 5, 2024; ESPN+
8	Army	68
9	Holy Cross	84
7	Navy	64
10	Loyola	48

Quarterfinals; Thursday March 7, 2024; ESPN+
1	Colgate	81
9	Holy Cross	64
4	American	57
5	Bucknell	80
2	Boston University	70
7	Navy	61
3	Lafayette	61
6	Lehigh	76

Semifinals; Sunday, March 10, 2024; CBSSN
1	Colgate	68
5	Bucknell	65
2	Boston University	79
6	Lehigh	84*

Championship; Wednesday, March 13, 2024; CBSSN
1	Colgate	74
6	Lehigh	55

* Denotes overtime period
