= Kevin Houston (basketball) =

American college basketball player

Personal information
- Born: 1964 or 1965 (age 61–62)
- Listed height: 5 ft 11 in (1.80 m)
- Listed weight: 165 lb (75 kg)

Career information
- High school: Pearl River (Pearl River, New York)
- College: Army (1983–1987)
- NBA draft: 1987: undrafted
- Position: Point guard / shooting guard

Career highlights
- Third team All-American – NABC (1987); NCAA scoring champion (1987); MAAC Player of the Year (1987); 3× First-team All-MAAC (1985–1987); MAAC Rookie of the Year (1984); Haggerty Award (1987)

Kevin Houston is an American former basketball player who is best known for leading NCAA Division I in scoring during his senior season at Army in 1986–87. He averaged 32.9 points per game in 29 games played and set still-standing school records for points in a single game (53) and season (953).

Houston was raised in Pearl River, New York and was a three-year starter on the varsity basketball team at Pearl River High School. He was a diminutive 5 ft 11 in (1.80 m), 165 lbs. in his prime during college, so as a high school player was even smaller. His small stature played a big role in why he was overlooked by college scouts.

Houston decided to attend the U.S. Military Academy Preparatory School in New Jersey for one year after high school. The United States Military Academy (Army), located in his home state of New York, was the only university that had shown Houston any interest during his basketball recruitment. He enrolled at Army in the fall of 1983 to play for the Black Knights. During his four-year career, Houston started every single one of the 113 games he played in, which ties him for the most all-time games played in Army history. By the time he graduated from the Academy in 1987, he had re-written the school's record book. Houston scored still-standing program records for points in a game (53), season (953), career (2,325), and season points per game (32.9) among others. He was the first ever Army player to be named the Haggerty Award winner, an honor that he shared as a senior with St. John's Mark Jackson, which is given to the best men's basketball player in the greater New York City metropolitan area. Houston was also the 1986–87 Metro Atlantic Athletic Conference Player of the Year and the NCAA season scoring champion. He was a three-time All-MAAC honoree, two-time honorable mention All-American and one-time third team All-American.

After college, Houston served his mandatory stint in the United States Army for several years. He continued to play basketball in the Army and befriended David Robinson in the process. He was discharged from service on August 1, 1990, six months before Operation Desert Storm began. After his discharge, he unsuccessfully tried out for the Washington Bullets and New Jersey Nets.

He got into high school coaching and guided the Storm King School, located in Cornwall-on-Hudson, New York, to two New England Private School Championships in just seven years. One of his players was future NBA draft pick Sammy Mejia. As of 2016, he was coaching junior varsity basketball at Pearl River High School and CYO basketball.

Kevin was married to his high school sweetheart, Elizabeth Cuccia, for 21 years before she died on January 3, 2009. They have three children: Lauren, Luke and Leanne.

== See also ==
- List of NCAA Division I men's basketball season scoring leaders
