= Chris Spatola =

Sports analyst and player (1979–2026)

Chris Spatola

Chris Spatola (January 7, 1979 – September 21, 2026) was an American college basketball player, coach and sports analyst best known for his work with ESPN.

== Career ==
=== College basketball ===
Spatola studied at the United States Military Academy, majoring in English and minoring in environmental engineering. Spatola was a four-year starter on the Army Black Knights basketball team from 1998 to 2002, leading the team in scoring for three of those seasons. Overall he averaged 13.9 points per game in 111 games for the team. He was a two-time second-team All-Patriot League pick.

=== Post-graduation ===
Following graduation, he served in the U.S. Army from 2002 to 2007, serving during Operation Iraqi Freedom.

Spatola joined the Duke basketball staff as an assistant coach from 2007 to 2012.

After leaving Duke's coaching staff, Spatola transitioned into broadcasting and worked as a color commentator for ESPN and TNT. He also contributed to SiriusXM radio.

== Personal life and death ==
Spatola married Duke basketball coach Mike Krzyzewski's daughter, Jamie, in 2004. They had three children.

Spatola died on September 21, 2026, at the age of 47.
