= The Woodlands Christian Academy =

Location
- 5800 Academy Way; The Woodlands, Texas 77384; United States; 30.205257°N 95.487714°W

Information
- Type: Private
- Established: 1993
- Head of school: Julie Ambler
- Faculty: 142
- Grades: Pre-K to 12th
- Enrollment: 900
- Student to teacher ratio: 12:1
- Campus size: 40 acres
- Campus type: Suburban
- Color: Green/Gold
- Mascot: Warriors
- Website: www.twca.net

The Woodlands Christian Academy is a private, college preparatory Christian school in The Woodlands, unincorporated Montgomery County, Texas. The school covers grades Pre-kindergarten through 12th grade, serving 900 students. The forty-acre campus is located 28 miles (45 km) north of Downtown Houston.

The school has a 40-acre (16 ha) campus.

== History ==
The school opened in September 1993, covering grades Pre-kindergarten through 6. The school was founded by local pediatrician Dr. William Parks. In 1999, The Woodlands Christian Academy moved to a new campus on Academy Way. The Timothy Administrative Building was completed in 1999 as the first permanent structure there. The high school was established at that time, and the first class of twelve students graduated in 2001. In 2002, the first gym, pavilion and athletic facilities were completed, including a state-of-the-art baseball complex and lighted football field.

The first permanent classroom building for the high school, the Nehemiah Academic Center, opened during the summer of 2009. In 2014, the Joshua Academic Center, providing permanent classrooms for lower and middle school students, and a second gym, the David Gymnasium, was completed.

In early May 2014 the school held a gala, raising $2.5 million for capital improvements. It plans to install a synthetic track lane around the American football facilities, to be completed in October 2016. The next project is to be a high school facility.

In late 2015, Warrior Stadium, complete with a turf field, Woodforest National Bank Field, and the 8-lane Tom Earle Track were completed.

== Facilities ==
The Joshua Academic Center houses the lower school. The Nehemiah Academic Center houses the middle school. The Micah Academic Center houses the high school. The Timothy Administration Building houses the administration and Library, the Warrior Cafe a large multi-purpose room, and school store "The Armory". The Student Life Center houses the main gym, as well as the sports medicine office and main locker rooms. The David Gym houses a full court gym, two half-court goals, and two indoor batting cages.

In late 2015, Warrior Stadium was completed with a turf field, Woodforest Bank© Field, and a competitive 8 lane track, Tom Earle track. The campus also has a state of the art baseball field, and softball field.

Sports that are offered include Volleyball, Basketball, Football, Golf, Swimming, Tennis, Track and Field, Cross Country, Cheer, Baseball, Softball and Soccer. The Woodlands Christian Academy's mascot is the Warrior. School colors are green and gold.

== Notable alumni ==
- Brennan Poole, NASCAR Driver
- Sketch, Twitch streamer and YouTuber

== See also ==
- Christianity in Houston
