= Christl Arena =

Multi-purpose arena in West Point, New York

- Holleder Center
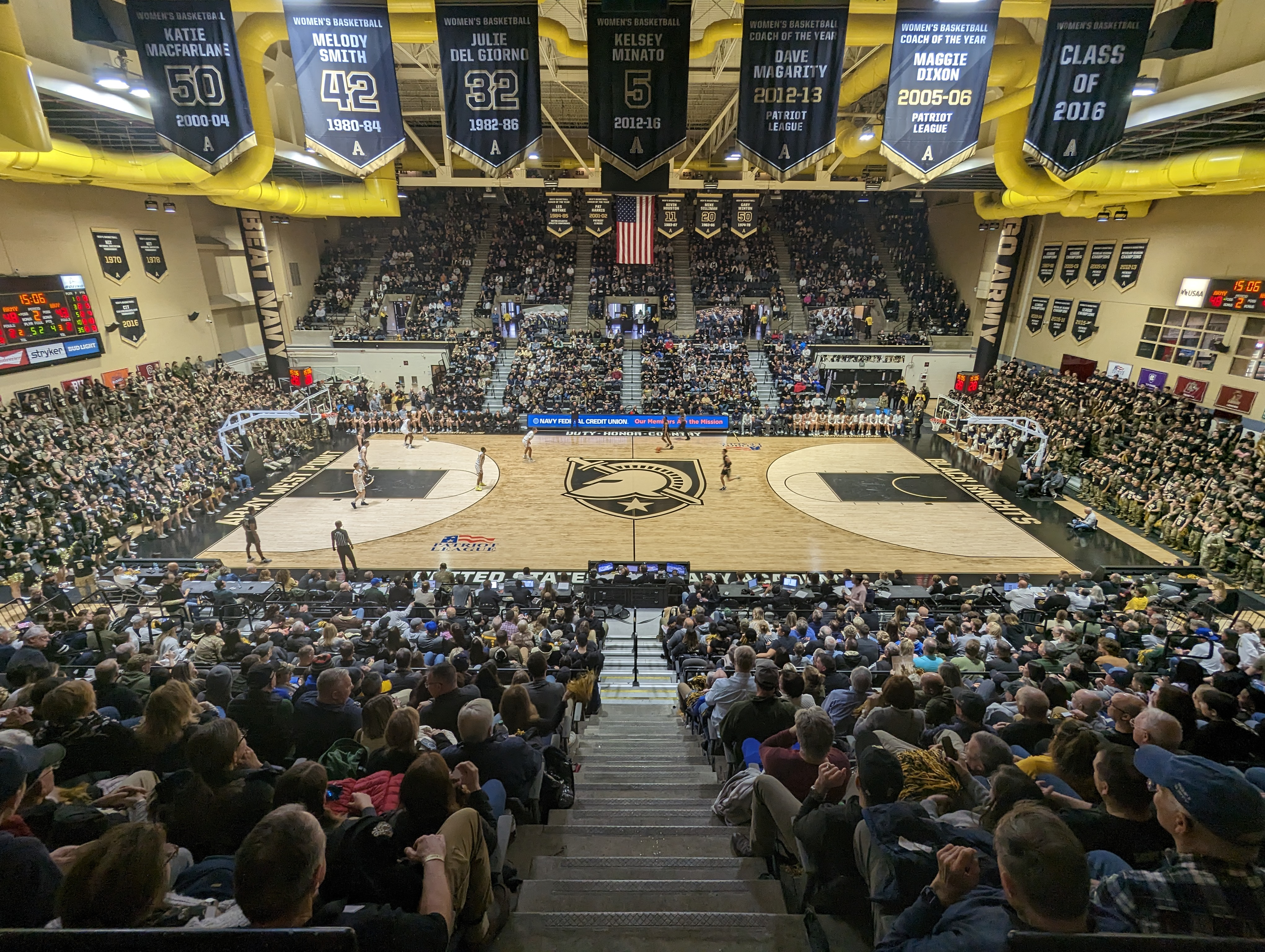
- Army vs Navy 2023
- Interactive map of Christl Arena
- Full name: Edward C. Christl Jr. Arena
- Location: 600 Thayer Road; West Point, NY 10996
- Coordinates: 41.38641°N 73.96571°W
- Owner: U.S. Military Academy
- Operator: U.S. Military Academy
- Capacity: 5,043 (basketball)
- Surface: Hardwood

Construction
- Groundbreaking: April 1983
- Opened: 1 October 1985
- Cost: $16 million (entire Holleder Center) ($47.9 million in 2025 dollars)

Tenants
- Army Black Knights (men's and women's basketball); NCAA Men's Gymnastics Championships (2005, 2010, 2017)

Edward C. Christl Jr. Arena is a 5,043-seat, multi-purpose arena in West Point, New York. It was built in 1985 as part of the Major Donald W. Holleder Center, which also houses Tate Rink. It is home to the United States Military Academy's Army Black Knights men's and women's basketball teams. It was named after 1st Lieutenant Edward C. Christl Jr. '44, a former basketball captain who was killed in combat in Austria during World War II while serving with the 65th Infantry Division. Maj. Holleder, '56, the namesake of the athletic center, was an All-American football and basketball player killed in combat in Vietnam in 1967.

The arena hosted portions of the 1995 and 1999 Patriot League men's basketball tournaments, as well as portions of the 2006 and 2008 Patriot League women's basketball tournament, including the 2006 Patriot League championship game, as Army defeated Holy Cross, clinching the first Division I NCAA Tournament bid in program history.

== Top 13 Christl Arena crowds ==
- 5,326, versus Duke, 11 November 2025
- 5,195, versus Navy, 8 February 2014
- 5,178, versus Navy, 22 January 2011
- 5,163, versus Navy, 20 February 2010
- 5,125, versus Navy, 28 February 2004
- 5,102, versus Navy, 17 February 1995
- 5,055, versus Duke, 16 November 1997
- 5,043, versus Navy, 19 January 2019
- 5,039, versus Navy, 15 February 1994
- 5,025, versus Navy, 24 February 1990
- 4,462, versus Navy, 31 January 2003
- 4,256, versus Navy, 23 February 2002
- 4,164, versus Lafayette, 9 February 1990

== See also ==
- Gillis Field House
- List of indoor arenas in the United States#Major college indoor arenas
- List of NCAA Division I basketball arenas
