= Jim Phelan Award =

American college basketball coach award

- Awarded for: the nation's top men's head coach in NCAA Division I basketball
- Country: United States
- Presented by: Collegeinsider.com

History
- First award: 2003
- Most recent: Johnny Dawkins, UCF
- Website: Official website

The Jim Phelan National Coach of the Year Award (formerly called the CollegeInsider.com National Coach of the Year Award) is an award given annually to the most outstanding men's college basketball head coach in NCAA Division I competition. The award was established in 2003 and was renamed for head coach Jim Phelan, who coached at Mount St. Mary's (MSMU). Phelan spent his entire 49-year coaching career at MSMU, compiling 830 wins in 1,354 games. He was inducted into the National Collegiate Basketball Hall of Fame in 2008.

== Key ==
| Coach (X) | Denotes the number of times the coach has been awarded the Jim Phelan Award at that point |
| * | Awarded a major national coach of the year award that same season: The Sporting News; Associated Press; NABC; Naismith; Adolph Rupp Cup; Henry Iba Award |
| W, L, W % | Total wins, total losses, win percentage |
| Finish | National postseason tournament result |

== Winners ==
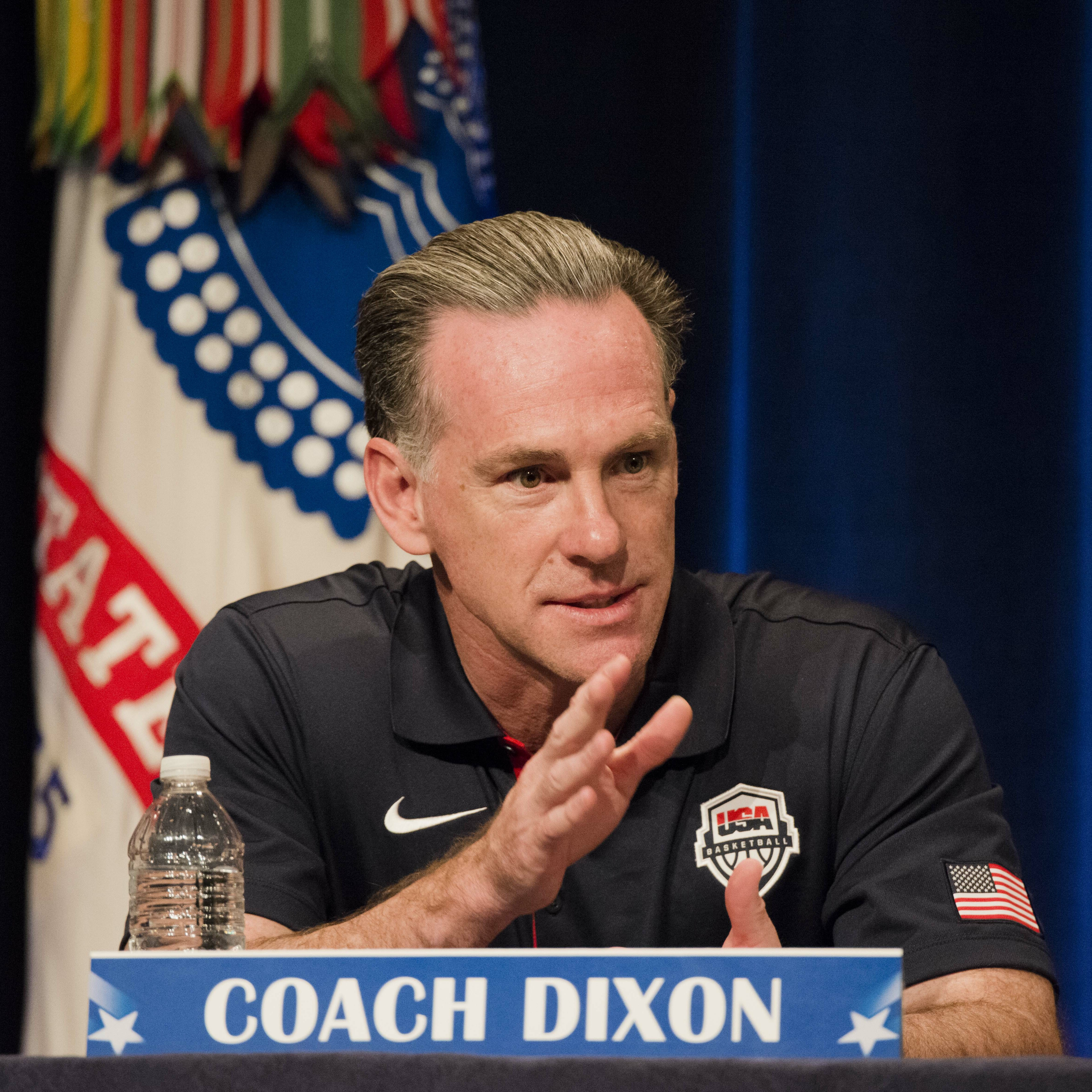
Jamie Dixon, Pittsburgh, 2010

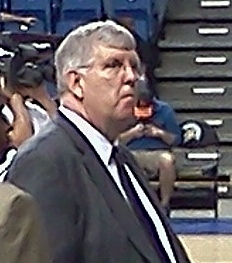
Stew Morrill, Utah State, 2011

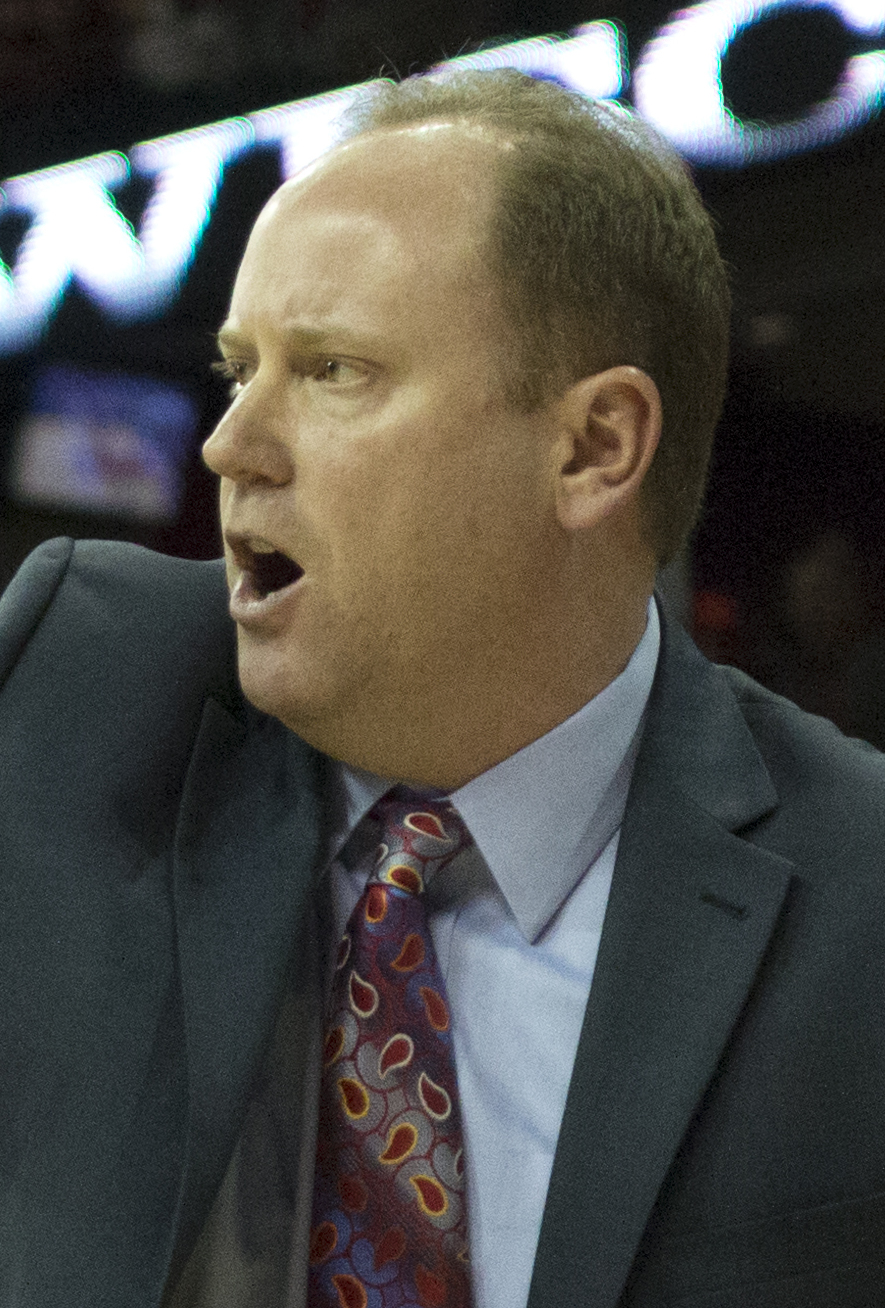
Greg Gard, Wisconsin, 2016

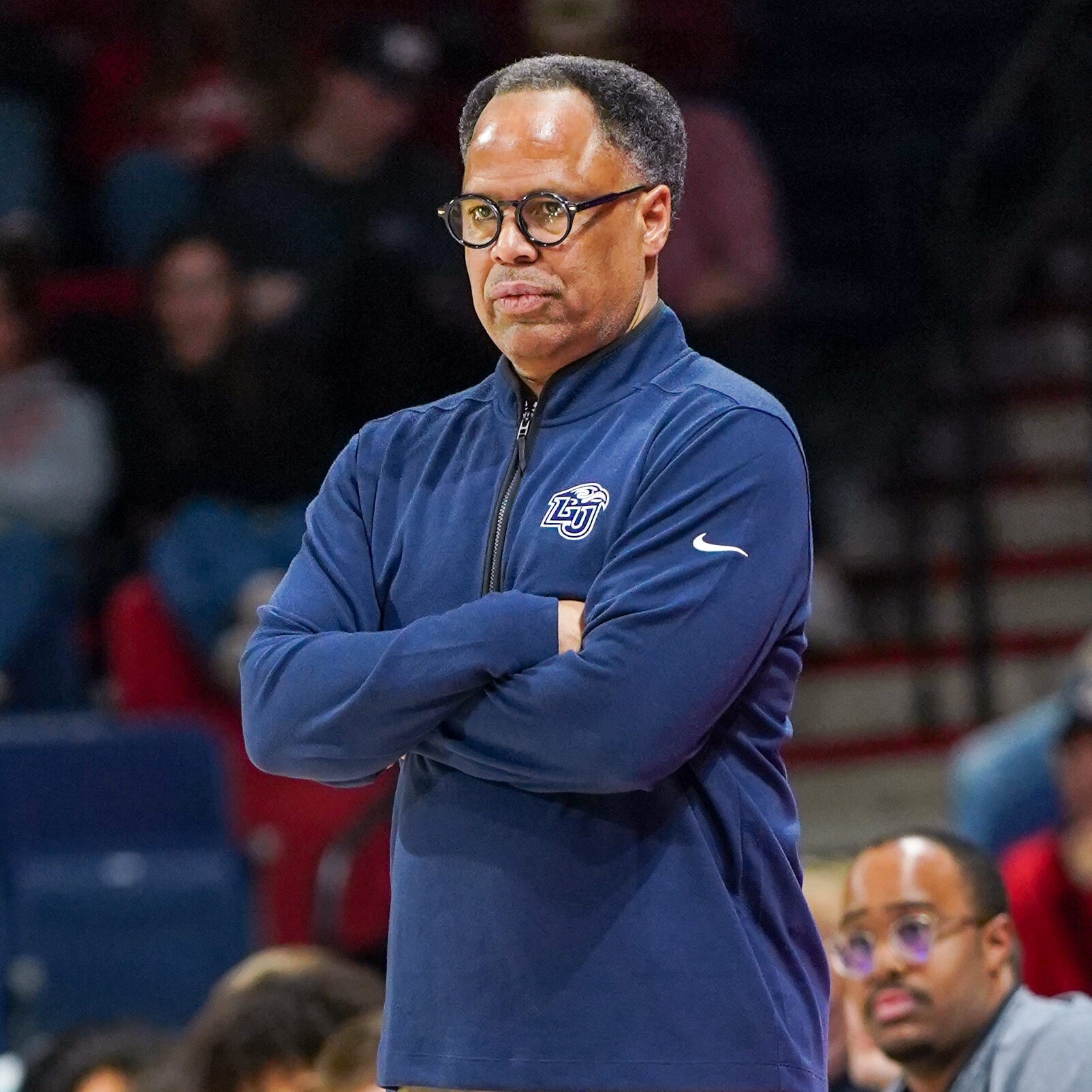
Ritchie McKay, Liberty, 2019

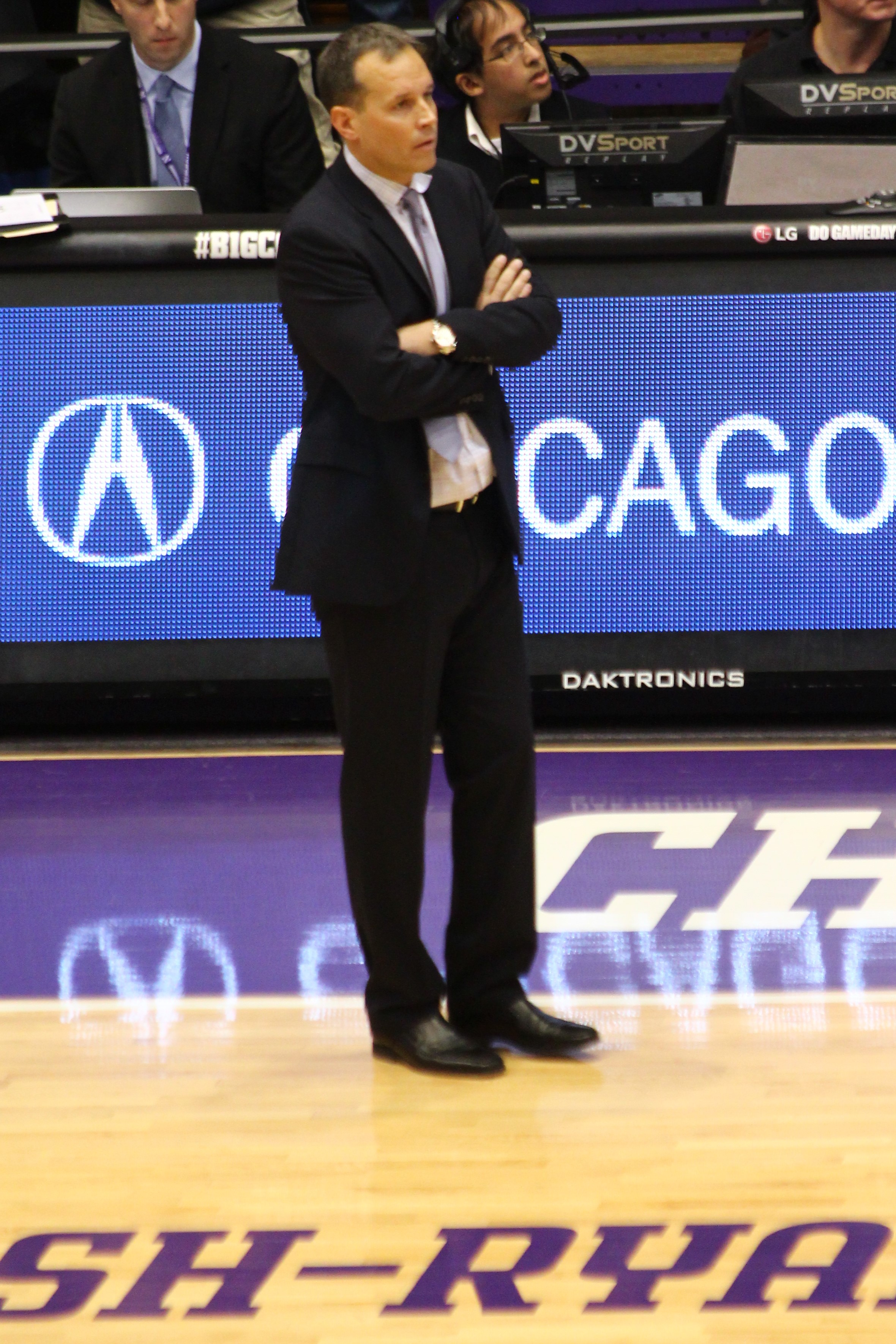
Chris Collins, Northwestern, 2023

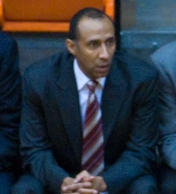
Johnny Dawkins, UCF, 2026

| Season | Coach | School | W | L | W % | Finish | Reference |
|---|---|---|---|---|---|---|---|
| 2002–03 | Mark Slonaker | Mercer | 23 | 6 | .793 | — | |
| 2003–04 | Phil Martelli* | Saint Joseph's | 30 | 2 | .938 | NCAA Elite Eight | |
| 2004–05 | Tubby Smith | Kentucky | 28 | 6 | .824 | NCAA Elite Eight | |
| 2005–06 | Ben Howland | UCLA | 32 | 7 | .821 | NCAA runners-up | |
| 2006–07 | Tony Bennett* | Washington State | 26 | 8 | .765 | NCAA second round | |
| 2007–08 | Bo Ryan | Wisconsin | 31 | 5 | .861 | NCAA Sweet Sixteen | |
| 2008–09 | John Calipari* | Memphis | 33 | 4 | .892 | NCAA Sweet Sixteen | |
| 2009–10 | Jamie Dixon | Pittsburgh | 25 | 9 | .735 | NCAA second round | |
| 2010–11 | Stew Morrill | Utah State | 30 | 4 | .882 | NCAA round of 64^{[a]} | |
| 2011–12 | Mike Brey | Notre Dame | 22 | 12 | .647 | NCAA round of 64 | |
| 2012–13 | Dana Altman | Oregon | 28 | 9 | .757 | NCAA Sweet Sixteen | |
| 2013–14 | Tim Miles | Nebraska | 19 | 13 | .594 | NCAA round of 64 | |
| 2014–15 | Bob Huggins | West Virginia | 25 | 10 | .714 | NCAA Sweet Sixteen | |
| 2015–16 | Greg Gard | Wisconsin | 22 | 13 | .629 | NCAA Sweet Sixteen | |
| 2016–17 | Frank Martin | South Carolina | 26 | 11 | .703 | NCAA Final Four | |
| 2017–18 | Chris Holtmann | Ohio State | 25 | 9 | .735 | NCAA round of 32 | |
| 2018–19 | Ritchie McKay | Liberty | 29 | 7 | .806 | NCAA round of 32 | |
| 2019–20 | Steve Pikiell | Rutgers | 20 | 11 | .645 | N/A^{[b]} | |
| 2020–21 | Todd Simon | Southern Utah | 20 | 4 | .833 | — | |
| 2021–22 | Mark Adams | Texas Tech | 27 | 10 | .730 | NCAA Sweet Sixteen | |
| 2022–23 | Chris Collins | Northwestern | 22 | 12 | .647 | NCAA round of 32 | |
| 2023–24 | Fred Hoiberg | Nebraska | 23 | 11 | .676 | NCAA round of 64 | |
| 2024–25 | Chris Beard | Ole Miss | 24 | 12 | .667 | NCAA Sweet Sixteen | |
| 2025–26 | Johnny Dawkins | UCF | 21 | 12 | .636 | NCAA round of 64 | |

- ^{a} The NCAA men's tournament expanded to 68 teams starting in 2011, with the last four teams earning bids into the tournament set in competition with one another via "First Four" play-in games. The 'first round' then became more commonly referred to as 'round of 64' for specificity.
- ^{b} The COVID-19 pandemic caused the 2019–20 season to be canceled prior to any national postseason tournaments occurring.

== See also ==
- Hugh Durham Award – Collegeinsider.com's award for the top mid-major men's basketball coach in NCAA Division I
