= Tyon Grant-Foster =

American college basketball player

No. 13 – Sioux Falls Skyforce
- Position: Shooting guard / small forward
- League: NBA G League

Personal information
- Born: March 5, 2000 (age 26)
- Listed height: 6 ft 7 in (2.01 m)
- Listed weight: 215 lb (98 kg)

Career information
- High school: F. L. Schlagle (Kansas City, Kansas)
- College: Indian Hills (2018–2020); Kansas (2020–2021); DePaul (2021–2022); Grand Canyon (2023–2025); Gonzaga (2025–2026)
- NBA draft: 2026: undrafted
- Playing career: 2026–present

Career history
- 2026–present: Sioux Falls Skyforce

Career highlights
- WAC Player of the Year (2024); 2× First-team All-WAC (2024, 2025); Perry Wallace Most Courageous Award (2026)

Tyon Grant-Foster (born March 5, 2000) is an American professional basketball player for the Sioux Falls Skyforce of the NBA G League. He played college basketball for the Indian Hills Warriors, Kansas Jayhawks, DePaul Blue Demons, Grand Canyon Antelopes, and Gonzaga Bulldogs.

== College career ==
Grant-Foster initially signed with Indian Hills Community College out of high school. He then transferred to the University of Kansas after two seasons. He played sparingly in the 2020–21 season, prompting him to enter the transfer portal, ending up at DePaul University. At DePaul, Grant-Foster played in only one game, collapsing at halftime of the Blue Demons' opener. After 16 months involving numerous tests, he was cleared to play.

Finding his options limited due to his health scare, Grant-Foster signed with coach Bryce Drew at Grand Canyon after receiving a recommendation from his cousin, Ish Wainright. Based on a strong start to the season for the Lopes and Grant-Foster, he was named to the Lou Henson Award watchlist. At the end of the regular season, Grant-Foster was named to the All-WAC First Team and named WAC Player of the Year, the first player from Grand Canyon to receive that honor. Grant-Foster also led the team in scoring with 22 points in Grand Canyon's first ever NCAA tournament win, upsetting the #5 seed and #15 ranked St. Mary's Gaels 75–66 on March 22, 2024.

Following his first season in Grand Canyon, Grant-Foster declared entry into the 2024 NBA draft, later being invited into the NBA Draft Combine. However, he was one of 93 underclassmen (or equivalents of that) to exit from the 2024 draft class following the May 31 deadline.

In 2025, Grant-Foster opted to transfer to Gonzaga. He averaged 14.8 points, 5.9 rebounds and 2.1 assists per game while shooting 39.9% from the field. In October 2025, the NCAA denied his eligibility waiver for the 2025-26 season.

== Professional career ==
Grant-Foster was selected 15th overall in the 2026 NBA G League draft by the Sioux Falls Skyforce.

== Career statistics ==
Legend
GP	Games played	GS	Games started	MPG	Minutes per game
FG%	Field goal percentage	3P%	3-point field goal percentage	FT%	Free throw percentage
RPG	Rebounds per game	APG	Assists per game	SPG	Steals per game
BPG	Blocks per game	PPG	Points per game	**Bold**	Career high

=== College ===
Year	Team	GP	GS	MPG	FG%	3P%	FT%	RPG	APG	SPG	BPG	PPG
2018–19	Indian Hills	33	5	7.6	.375	.279	.683	4.2	.8	.7	**1.5**	8.2
2019–20	Indian Hills	31	24	24.1	.483	.335	.722	**6.5**	1.7	1.1	**1.5**	16.5
2020–21	Kansas	22	0	8.1	.391	.130	.524	2.2	.2	.3	.4	3.1
2021–22	DePaul	1	1	15.0	**.500**	**.500**	**1.000**	3.0	1.0	.0	1.0	9.0
2023–24	Grand Canyon	34	**34**	**33.5**	.446	.331	.745	6.1	1.6	**1.7**	**1.5**	**20.1**
2024–25	Grand Canyon	26	17	27.5	.399	.232	.686	5.9	**2.1**	**1.7**	**1.5**	14.8
2025–26	Gonzaga	**35**	6	21.5	.475	.262	.611	5.0	1.2	.8	1.1	11.1
Career (NCAA DI)		118	58	23.7	.438	.276	.691	5.0	1.3	1.2	1.2	13.0

== Personal life ==
Tyon was born to Willie Foster and Talisha Grant and has three younger brothers. His cousin Ish Wainright is a former Phoenix Suns and Portland Trail Blazers power forward.
