= Hugh Durham Award =

American collegiate men's basketball coach award

- Awarded for: the nation's top mid-major men's head coach in NCAA Division I basketball
- Country: United States
- Presented by: Collegeinsider.com

History
- First award: 2005
- Most recent: Jon Perry, Navy
- Website: Official website

The Hugh Durham National Coach of the Year Award (formerly called the CollegeInsider.com Mid-Major Coach of the Year Award) is an award given annually to the most outstanding mid-major men's college basketball head coach in NCAA Division I competition. The award was established in 2005 and was renamed for head coach Hugh Durham, who coached at Florida State, Georgia and Jacksonville. He led those teams to a combined 15 national postseason tournaments, including a national runner-up season with Florida State in 1972 and a Final Four appearance with Georgia in 1983.

== Selection ==
The Hugh Durham Award is voted on by 10-member panel consisting of former and current head coaches along with two senior staff members from Collegeinsider.com. The award is presented at the Final Four to the top mid-major men's basketball coach.

Definitions of the term "mid-major" in the context of college basketball vary widely. For purposes of its "mid-major" awards and honors—the Durham Award for coaches and the Lou Henson Award and Lou Henson All-America Team for players—Collegeinsider.com has established its own definition of the term, which includes the following conferences, as well as any basketball independents.

- America East Conference
- Atlantic Sun Conference
- Big Sky Conference
- Big South Conference
- Big West Conference
- Coastal Athletic Association
- Conference USA
- Horizon League
- Independents
- Ivy League
- Metro Conference
- Mid-American Conference
- Mid-Eastern Athletic Conference
- Missouri Valley Conference
- Northeast Conference
- Ohio Valley Conference
- Patriot League
- Southern Conference
- Southland Conference
- Southwestern Athletic Conference
- Summit League
- Sun Belt Conference
- West Coast Conference
- Western Athletic Conference

Of these conferences, the only ones that sponsor Football Bowl Subdivision (FBS) football are Conference USA, Mid-American, and Sun Belt. All other FBS conferences, as well as the Atlantic 10 Conference (which has not sponsored football at all since 2006), have been excluded from the Collegeinsider.com list of "mid-majors" throughout the award's history. Following major conference realignment that peaked in 2013, the Western Athletic Conference, which dropped football after the 2012 season, was added to the eligible list, while both offshoots of the original Big East Conference (the FBS American Athletic Conference and the new non-football Big East) were excluded from eligibility.

== Key ==
Coach (X)	Denotes the number of times the coach has been awarded the Hugh Durham Award at that point
W, L, W %	Total wins, total losses, win percentage
Finish	National postseason tournament result

== Winners ==
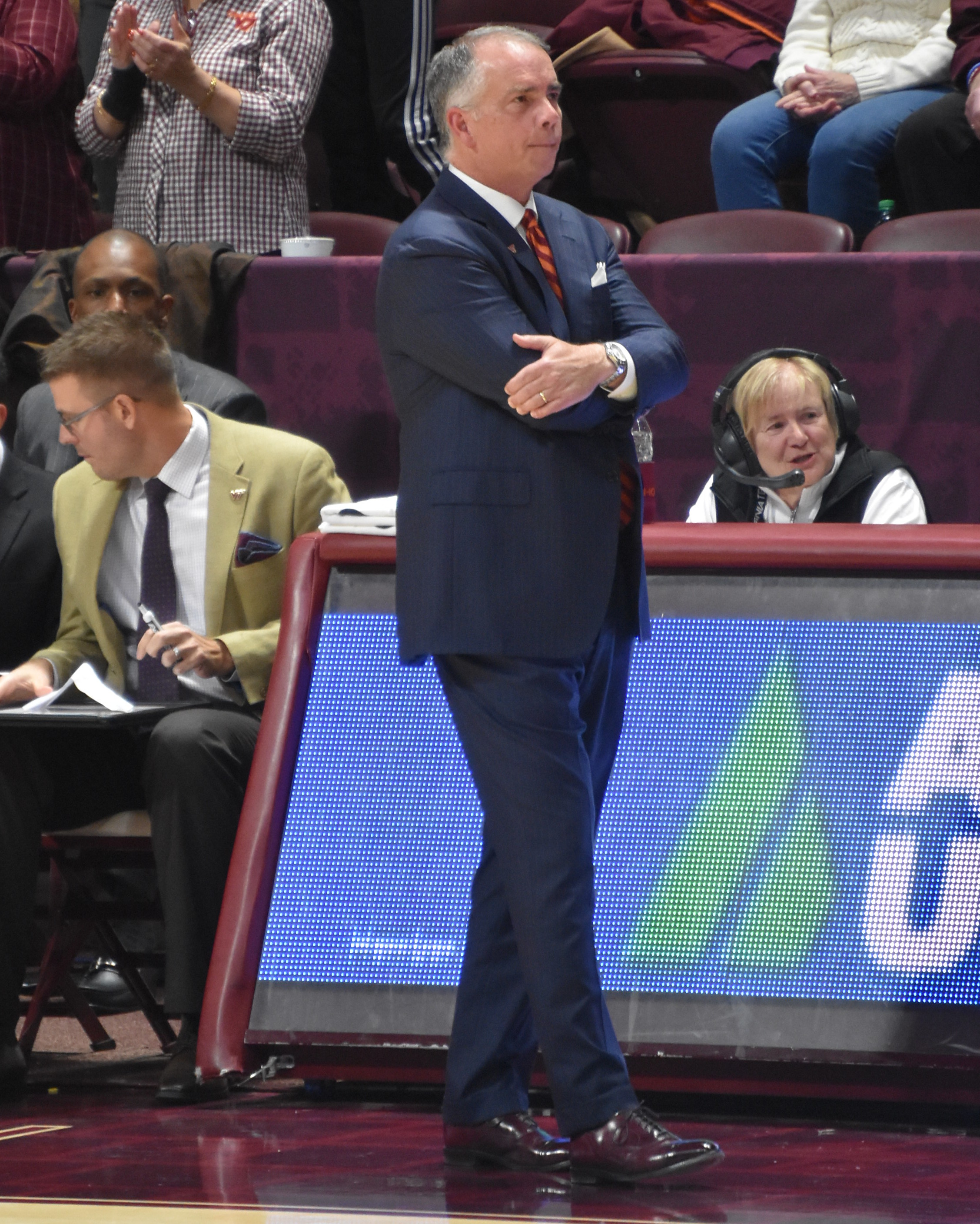
Mike Young, Wofford, 2010

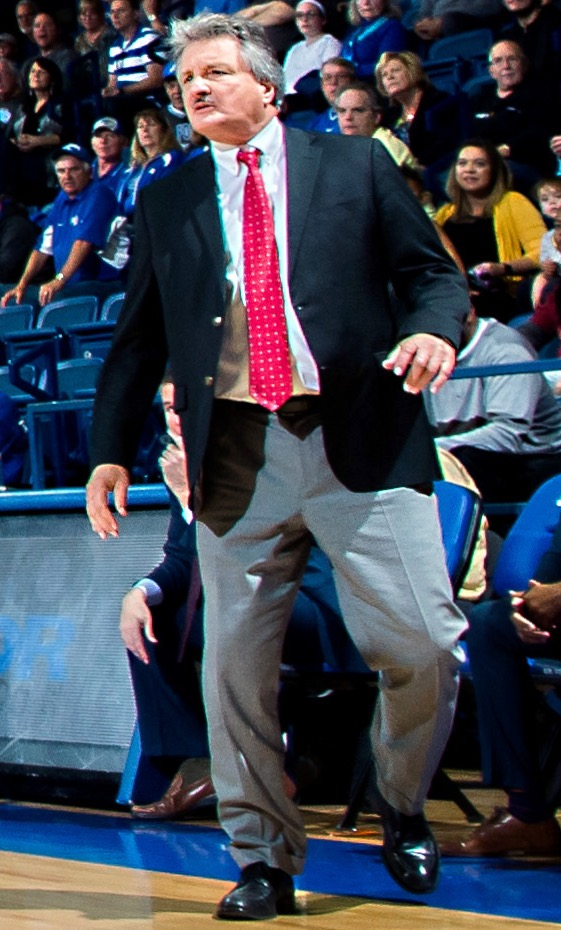
Danny Kaspar, Stephen F. Austin, 2013

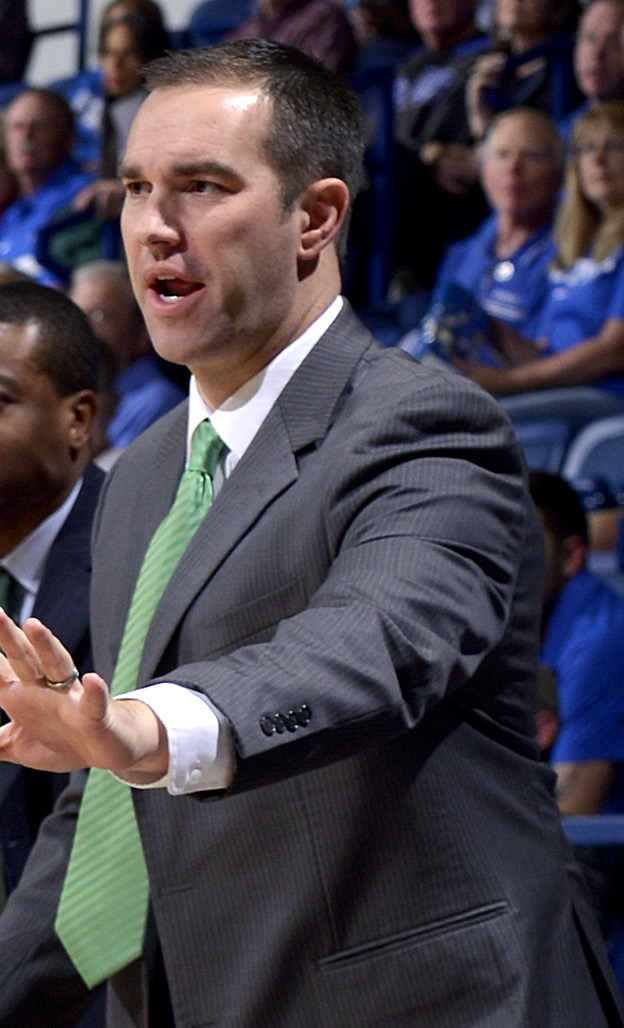
Tony Jasick, IPFW, 2014

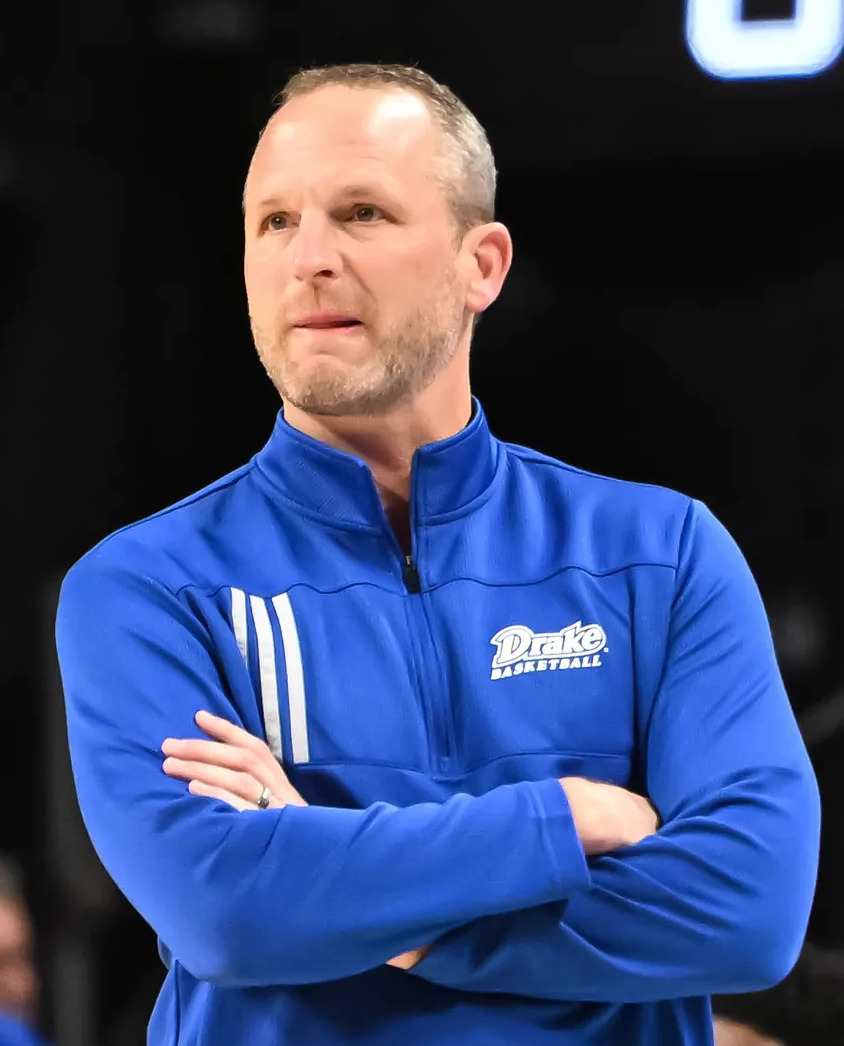
Darian DeVries, Drake, 2019

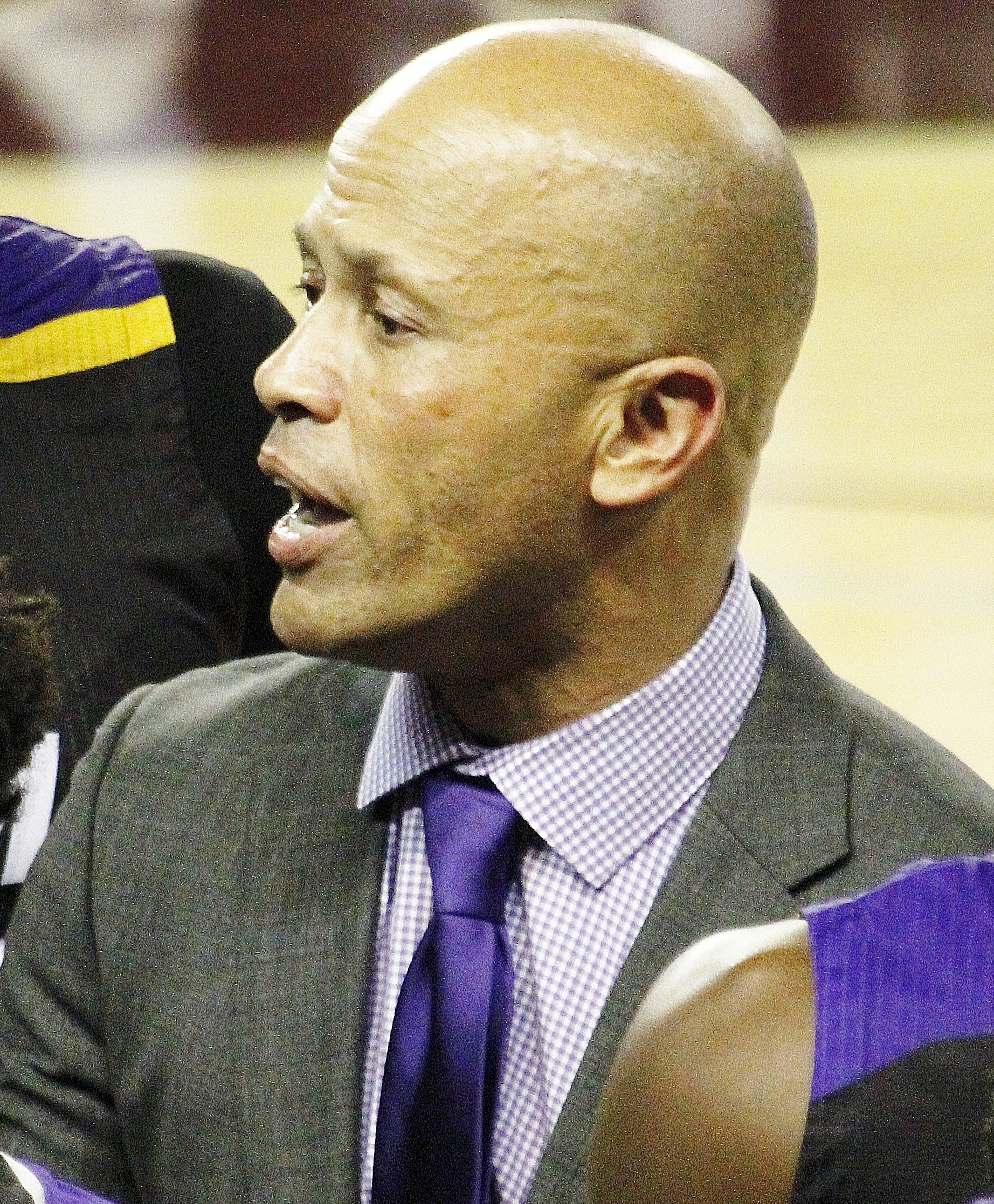
Byron Smith, Prairie View A&M, 2021

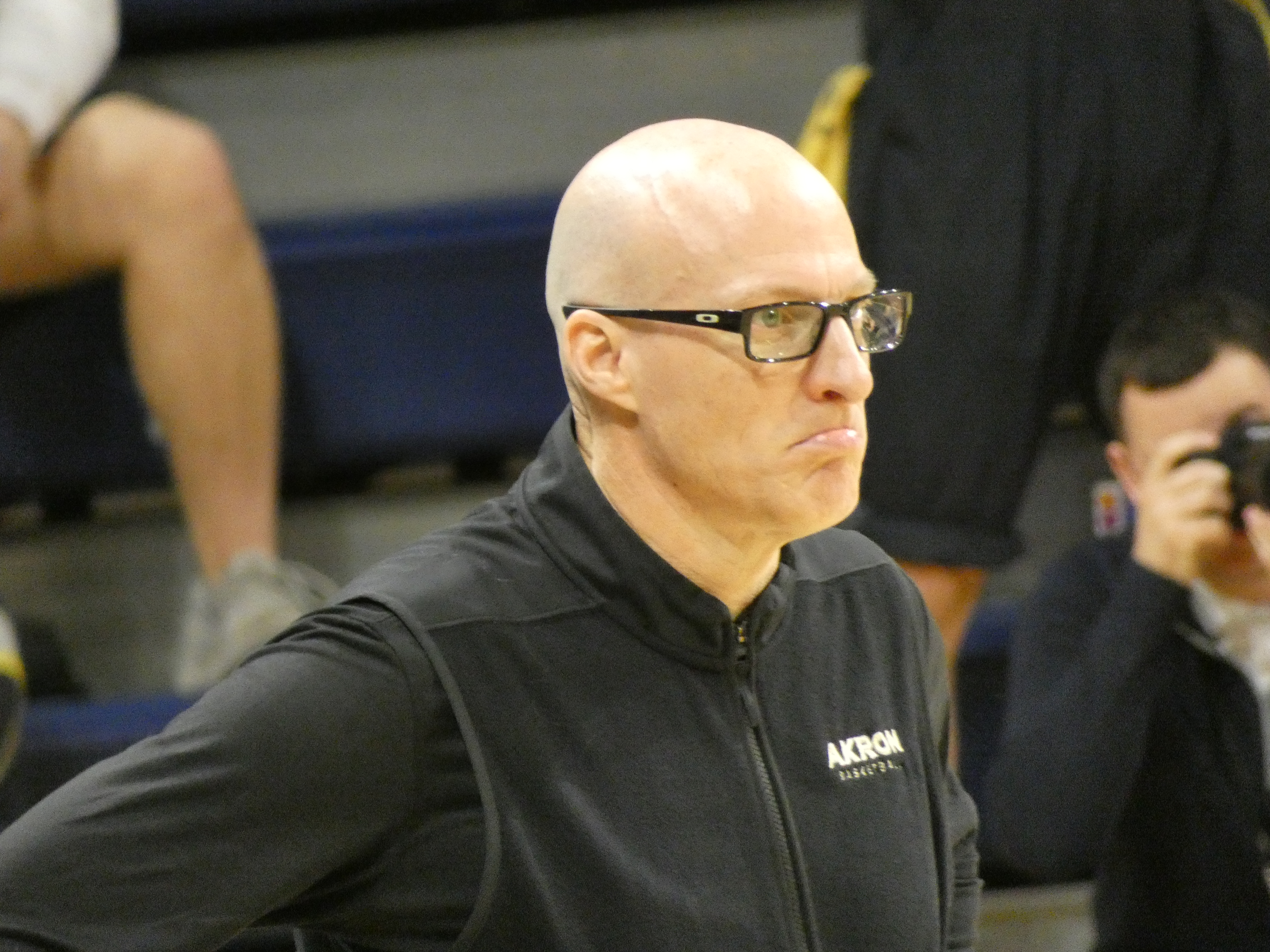
John Groce, Akron, 2025

Season	Coach	School	W	L	W %	Finish	Reference
2004–05	Bob Thomason	Pacific	27	4	.871	NCAA second round	
2005–06	Pat Flannery	Bucknell	27	5	.844	NCAA second round	
2006–07	Gregg Marshall	Winthrop	29	5	.853	NCAA second round	
2007–08	Keno Davis	Drake	28	5	.848	NCAA first round	
2008–09	Todd Bozeman	Morgan State	23	12	.657	NCAA first round	
2009–10	Mike Young	Wofford	26	9	.743	NCAA first round	
2010–11	Rick Byrd	Belmont	30	5	.857	NCAA round of 64^{[a]}	
2011–12	Eddie Payne	USC Upstate	21	13	.618	CIT second round	
2012–13	Danny Kaspar	Stephen F. Austin	27	5	.844	NIT first round	
2013–14	Tony Jasick	IPFW	25	11	.694	CIT second round	
2014–15	Brian Katz	Sacramento State	21	12	.636	CIT second round	
2015–16	James Jones	Yale	23	7	.767	NCAA second round	
2016–17	Rod Barnes	Cal State Bakersfield	25	10	.714	NIT semifinals	
2017–18	Ryan Odom	UMBC	25	11	.694	NCAA second round	
2018–19	Darian DeVries	Drake	24	10	.706	CIT first round	
2019–20	Steve Forbes	East Tennessee State	30	4	.882	N/A^{[b]}	
2020–21	Byron Smith	Prairie View A&M	16	5	.762	—	
2021–22	Robert Jones	Norfolk State	24	7	.774	NCAA round of 64	
2022–23	Amir Abdur-Rahim	Kennesaw State	26	9	.743	NCAA round of 64	
2023–24	Josh Schertz	Indiana State	32	7	.821	NIT runners-up	
2024–25	John Groce	Akron	28	7	.800	NCAA round of 64	
2025–26	Jon Perry	Navy	26	8	.765	NIT first round	

- ^{a} The NCAA men's tournament expanded to 68 teams starting in 2011, with the last four teams earning bids into the tournament set in competition with one another via "First Four" play-in games. The 'first round' then became more commonly referred to as 'round of 64' for specificity.
- ^{b} The COVID-19 pandemic caused the 2019–20 season to be canceled prior to any national postseason tournaments occurring.
