= Brian Moore Jr. =

American basketball player (born 2001)

No. 5 – Grand Canyon Antelopes
- Position: Guard
- League: Mountain West

Personal information
- Born: November 24, 2001 (age 24)
- Listed height: 6 ft 2 in (1.88 m)
- Listed weight: 190 lb (86 kg)

Career information
- High school: Kingston (Kingston, New York); Believe Prep (Rock Hill, South Carolina)
- College: NE Oklahoma A&M (2020–2022); Murray State (2022–2024); Norfolk State (2024–2025); Grand Canyon (2025–present)

Career highlights
- Lou Henson Award (2025); First-team All-MEAC (2025); MEAC Newcomer of the Year (2025); MEAC tournament MVP (2025); 2× NJCAA Division I All-American (2021, 2022)

Brian Moore Jr. (born November 24, 2001) is an American college basketball player for the Grand Canyon Antelopes. He previously played at Northeastern Oklahoma A&M College, the Murray State Racers, and the Norfolk State Spartans. He was the 2025 recipient of the Lou Henson Award as the best mid-major player while at Norfolk State.

== Early life ==
Moore is from Harlem, New York. His grandmother helped raise him but died due to cancer when Moore was age 11. According to the Times Herald-Record, after receiving news of his grandmother's death, Moore "grabbed a basketball and headed to St. Nicholas Park. He took shots and cried, not hearing the voice of an AAU coach who was passing by. The coach comforted Moore. They talked about his grandmother’s positive influence over him. The coach invited Moore to try out for her AAU team and he received his introduction to organized basketball."

Moore attended Kingston High School where he was a top basketball player. As a senior, he was named the Varsity 845 player of the year and the Daily Freeman boys basketball player of the year after averaging 27.4 points. He concluded his stint at Kingston as their fourth-leading scorer all-time with 1,227 points. Coming out of high school, the only interested NCAA Division I school was Howard University, but Moore did not academically qualify. He thus played a season at Believe Prep in Rock Hill, South Carolina, before deciding to begin his college basketball career at Northeastern Oklahoma A&M College.

== College career ==
Moore played two seasons at Northeastern Oklahoma A&M, being named a junior college All-American and scoring 1,064 points. He then transferred to the Murray State Racers, where he played two seasons mostly coming off the bench. He averaged 8.2 points for Murray State during the 2022–23 season. Then in 2023–24, he started 10 games and averaged 9.2 points while being named to the Missouri Valley Conference (MVC) All-Bench team, before entering the NCAA transfer portal at the end of the season. He transferred to the Norfolk State Spartans for the 2024–25 season.

Moore became a top player at Norfolk State, helping the team win the Mid-Eastern Athletic Conference (MEAC) championship game while advancing to the NCAA Tournament. He averaged 18.1 points and shot 54.5%, being the only guard nationally to record an average of 18.0 points while shooting over 54.0%. He was named the MEAC Tournament Most Outstanding Player, first-team All-HBCU All-American, and the winner of the Lou Henson Award as the best mid-major player.
