= 2026 NBA G League draft =

Basketball league draft

General information
- Sport: Basketball
- Date: October 24, 2026

Overview
- League: NBA
- First selection: Jeremy Sochan (Texas Legends)

The 2026 NBA G League draft was the 26th draft of the NBA G League. It was held on October 24, 2026. Jeremy Sochan was selected by the Texas Legends as the first overall pick.

== Key ==
| Pos. | G | F | C |
| Position | Guard | Forward | Center |

| † | Denotes player who was also selected in an NBA Draft |

== Draft ==
=== First round ===
| Pick | Player | Pos. | Nationality | Team | College/country |
|---|---|---|---|---|---|
| 1 | Jeremy Sochan^{†} | F | Poland | Texas Legends | Baylor |
| 2 | Isaiah Carr | | United States | Motor City Cruise | Drake |
| 3 | Kasean Pryor | | United States | Osceola Magic | Louisville |
| 4 | Chris Bell | | United States | Osceola Magic | California |
| 5 | Jailen Bedford | | United States | Oklahoma City Blue | Virginia Tech |
| 6 | Josh Roberts | | United States | Maine Celtics | Manhattan |
| 7 | Tyler Cochran | | United States | Sioux Falls Skyforce | Rhode Island |
| 8 | Pierre Brooks | | United States | Capital City Go-Go | Butler |
| 9 | Yusuf Mohamed | | United States | Oklahoma City Blue | Westminster |
| 10 | Jevin Muniz | | United States | Texas Legends | Colorado State |
| 11 | Pierre Crockrell II | | United States | Greensboro Swarm | California-Irvine |
| 12 | Themus Fulks | | United States | Laketown Squadron | Central Florida |
| 13 | Barry Evans | | United States | Capital City Go-Go | Virginia Commonwealth |
| 14 | T.J. Bickerstaff | | United States | Laketown Squadron | James Madison |
| 15 | Tyon Grant-Foster | | United States | Sioux Falls Skyforce | Gonzaga |
| 16 | Benny Williams | | United States | Capital City Go-Go | Central Florida |
| 17 | Matthew Lane | | United States | Texas Legends | Molloy |
| 18 | Jordan Johnson | | United States | Iowa Wolves | UNLV |
| 19 | Maleeck Harden-Hayes | | United States | Noblesville Boom | North Carolina-Wilmington |
| 20 | Lacey James | | United States | Greensboro Swarm | Northern Illinois |
| 21 | Faizon Fields | | United States | Coachella Valley Lakers | Wisconsin-Milwaukee |
| 22 | Jayden Pierre | | United States | Coachella Valley Lakers | Texas Christian |
| 23 | Kaleb Lowery | | United States | Maine Celtics | Nevada |
| 24 | Masai Olowokere | | United States | Sioux Falls Skyforce | Central Arkansas |
| 25 | Amir Spears | | United States | Westchester Knicks | Texas-San Antonio |
| 26 | Amir Spears | | United States | College Park Skyhawks | Clemson |
| 27 | Daveon Thomas | | United States | Raptors 905 | Cincinnati |
| 28 | Tre Dinkins | | United States | Westchester Knicks | George Washington |
| 29 | Jason Thirdkill | | United States | Delaware Blue Coats | Jacksonville |
| 30 | Jordan Bone | | United States | Laketown Squadron | Tennessee |
| 31 | Russell Tchewa | | United States | Windy City Bulls | Georgia |

=== Second round ===
| Pick | Player | Pos. | Nationality | Team | College/country |
|---|---|---|---|---|---|
| 1 | Emmitt Matthews Jr. | | United States | Osceola Magic | West Virginia |
| 2 | Justin Wilson | | United States | Raptors 905 | Northwestern State |
| 3 | Justin Ndjock-Tadjore | | United States | Austin Spurs | Ottawa |
| 4 | Markhi Strickland | | United States | Cleveland Charge | North Dakota State |
| 5 | Markhi Strickland | | United States | Cleveland Charge | North Dakota State |
| 6 | Desmond Cambridge | | United States | Maine Celtics | Arizona State |
| 7 | Matthew Moncrieffe | | United States | Windy City Bulls | Seattle |
| 8 | Chris Flippin | | United States | Valley Suns | Maryland-Eastern Shore |
| 9 | Jonathan Jackson | | United States | Texas Legends | Midwestern State |
| 10 | Quion Burns | | United States | Coachella Valley Lakers | Maine |
| 11 | Quinn Slazinski | | United States | Rip City Remix | West Virginia |
| 12 | Tyson Acuff | | United States | Motor City Cruise | Rutgers |
| 13 | Tegra Izay | | United States | Coachella Valley Lakers | Southern Mississipi |
| 14 | – | – | – | Santa Cruz Warriors | – |
| 15 | Vance Jackson | | United States | Laketown Squadron | East Carolina |
| 16 | Rafael Pinzon | | United States | Motor City Cruise | Bryant |
| 17 | – | – | – | Salt Lake City Stars | – |
| 18 | – | – | – | Texas Legends | – |
| 19 | Brody Fox | | United States | Wisconsin Herd | The Citadel |
| 20 | T.J. Clark | | United States | Delaware Blue Coats | Overtime Elite |
| 21 | Anton Brookshire | | United States | Iowa Wolves | Austin Peay |
| 22 | Austin Benigni | | United States | Noblesville Boom | Navy |
| 23 | – | – | – | Iowa Wolves | – |
| 24 | – | – | – | Cleveland Charge | – |
| 25 | – | – | – | Laketown Squadron | – |
| 26 | Ben Coupet Jr. | | United States | Stockton Kings | Southern Illinois-Carbondale |
| 27 | Olin Carter III | | United States | Memphis Hustle | San Diego |
| 28 | Vander Blue | | United States | Grand Rapids Gold | Marquette |
| 29 | Jasman Sangha | | United States | Windy City Bulls | Canisius |
| 30 | – | – | – | Laketown Squadron | – |
| 31 | – | – | – | Greensboro Swarm | – |
