= Austin Benigni =

American basketball player (born 2002)

Noblesville Boom
- Position: Point guard
- League: NBA G League

Personal information
- Born: September 18, 2002 (age 24)
- Listed height: 5 ft 11 in (1.80 m)
- Listed weight: 171 lb (78 kg)

Career information
- High school: The Woodlands Christian Academy (The Woodlands, Texas)
- College: Navy (2022–2026)
- NBA draft: 2026: undrafted
- Playing career: 2026–present

Career history
- 2026–present: Noblesville Boom

Career highlights
- Lou Henson Award (2026); Patriot League Player of the Year (2026); 2× First-team All-Patriot League (2025, 2026); Second-team All-Patriot League (2024)

Austin Caleb Benigni (born September 18, 2002) is an American professional basketball player. for the Noblesville Boom of the NBA G League He played college basketball for the Navy Midshipmen.

== Early life and high school ==
Benigni attended The Woodlands Christian Academy in The Woodlands, Texas. As a junior, he averaged 20 points, 4.8 rebounds, four assists, and 2.6 steals per game. Following his high school career, Benigni committed to play college basketball at the United States Naval Academy, choosing the Midshipmen over several other Division I offers.

== College career ==
Benigni earned immediate playing time as a freshman and increased his production as a sophomore. As a junior, he averaged 18.8 points per game and was named to the first team All-Patriot League before entering the transfer portal. He ultimately withdrew from the portal and returned to Navy for his senior season. In December 2025, during a game against Coppin State, Benigni surpassed 1,500 career points. He finished his senior season averaging 18.0 points, 4.4 assists, and 3.4 rebounds per game. At the end of the season, Benigni was named the Patriot League Player of the Year and received the Lou Henson Award.

== Professional career ==
Benigni was picked with the No. 53 overall selection in the 2026 NBA G League draft by the Noblesville Boom.

== Career statistics ==
Legend
GP	Games played	GS	Games started	MPG	Minutes per game
FG%	Field goal percentage	3P%	3-point field goal percentage	FT%	Free throw percentage
RPG	Rebounds per game	APG	Assists per game	SPG	Steals per game
BPG	Blocks per game	PPG	Points per game	**Bold**	Career high

=== College ===
Year	Team	GP	GS	MPG	FG%	3P%	FT%	RPG	APG	SPG	BPG	PPG
2022–23	Navy	31	7	18.5	.378	.200	.849	1.9	2.2	.7	.1	4.7
2023–24	Navy	31	31	33.5	.387	.247	.847	2.9	3.8	.7	.1	17.0
2024–25	Navy	**34**	**34**	33.8	.406	.337	.863	3.3	4.3	.9	**.2**	**18.8**
2025–26	Navy	**34**	**34**	**36.1**	**.424**	**.441**	**.880**	**3.4**	**4.4**	**1.3**	**.2**	18.0
