= Jon Perry =

American basketball coach (born 1978)

Current position
- Title: Head coach
- Team: Navy
- Conference: Patriot League
- Record: 30–10 (.750)

Biographical details
- Born: August 29, 1978 (age 48); Milton, West Virginia, U.S.

Playing career
- 1998–2002: East Tennessee State

Coaching career (HC unless noted)
- 2002–2004: East Tennessee State (GA)
- 2010–2013: Quincy (IL) (assistant)
- 2013–2020: Navy (assistant)
- 2020–2025: Navy (associate HC)
- 2025–present: Navy

Administrative career (AD unless noted)
- 2004–2008: Penn State (video)
- 2008–2010: Penn State (DBO)

Head coaching record
- Overall: 30–10 (.750)
- Tournaments: 0–1 (NIT)

Accomplishments and honors

Championships
- Patriot League regular season (2026)

Awards
- Hugh Durham Award (2026); Patriot League Coaching Staff of the Year (2026)

Jonathan David Perry (born August 29, 1978) is an American college basketball coach who is currently the head coach for the Navy Midshipmen. He previously spent twelve seasons on the staff at Navy under Ed DeChellis, whom he also played for at East Tennessee State.

== Coaching career ==
In 2013, he was hired by the Navy Midshipmen as an assistant coach and in 2020 was elevated to associate head coach. On April 1, 2025, he was promoted to be the Midshipmen's next head coach.

== Head coaching record ==
Record table
Season	Team	Overall	Conference	Standing	Postseason
Navy Midshipmen (Patriot League) (2025–present)
2025–26	Navy	26–8	17–1	1st	NIT First Round
2026–27	Navy	4–2	0–0		
Navy:		30–10 (.750)	17–1 (.944)		
Total:		30–10 (.750)			
National champion Postseason invitational champion Conference regular season champion Conference regular season and conference tournament champion Division regular season champion Division regular season and conference tournament champion Conference tournament champion
