= Collegeinsider.com =

Collegeinsider.com is a sports website based in Boston that is noted particularly for its basketball polls, awards and sponsored tournament.

The website was founded by Joe Dwyer and Angela Lento and traces it history to 1995 as regional basketball newsletter. The collegeinsider.com domain was registered on June 13, 1997.

The organization achieved its first attention for its midmajor poll which began in 1998.

On December 3, 2020, the organization founded Eracism.

== Sponsored events and awards ==
=== Tournaments ===
- CollegeInsider.com Postseason Tournament (CIT) - Established 2009 as an alternative basketball venue for schools not selected for the NCAA or NIT tournaments, suspended after 2019 due to the COVID-19 pandemic, relaunched in 2024, and suspended in 2025.
- The Basketball Classic - A rebranding of the CIT launched and last contested in 2022.

=== Awards ===
- Jack Bennett Award
- Lefty Driesell Award – Established 2010 to the most outstanding men's college basketball defender in NCAA Division I competition.
- Hugh Durham Award – Established in 2005 to the most outstanding mid-major men's college basketball head coach in NCAA Division I competition.
- Clarence Gaines Award
- Joe B. Hall Award
- Lou Henson All-America Team – Established in 2010 alongside the Lou Henson Award (below). Initially honored the top 30 NCAA Division I mid-major men's players, with all treated equally as All-Americans. Reduced to 25 in 2012, and now excludes players who make the Lute Olson All-America Team.
- Lou Henson Award – Established in 2010 for the most outstanding mid-major men's college basketball player in NCAA Division I competition. Beginning in 2012, the award was restricted to mid-major players who were not recognized on the Lute Olson All-America Team (below).
- Ben Jobe Award – Established 2010 for outstanding minority men's college basketball head coach in NCAA Division I.
- Kyle Macy Award
- John McLendon Award
- Don Meyer Award
- Lute Olson All-America Team – Established in 2012 as a supplement to the Lute Olson Award (below). Honors the top 25 NCAA Division I men's players regardless of conference affiliation or year of attendance, with all treated equally as All-Americans.
- Lute Olson Award – Established in 2010 for the most outstanding Division I men's college basketball player. Prior to the 2021–22 season, eligibility was restricted to players who had completed at least two seasons at their current school.
- Jim Phelan Award – Established 2003 for outstanding men's college basketball head coach in NCAA Division I (non–mid-major conference) competition.
- Skip Prosser Man of the Year Award – Established in 2008 for Division I basketball coach who exhibits strong moral character.
- Glenn Robinson Award
- Riley Wallace All-America Team
- Kay Yow Award – Established 2010 for outstanding women's Division I basketball coach.
