= Lou Henson Award =

College basketball award

- Awarded for: the nation's top mid-major men's player in NCAA Division I basketball
- Country: United States
- Presented by: Collegeinsider.com

History
- First award: 2010
- Most recent: Austin Benigni, Navy
- Website: Official website

The Lou Henson Award is an award given annually by Collegeinsider.com to the most outstanding mid-major men's college basketball player in NCAA Division I competition. The award, established in 2010, is named for esteemed men's college basketball head coach Lou Henson. Henson, who coached at Hardin–Simmons, New Mexico State, and Illinois, compiled 779 all-time wins. He is in the top 10 of NCAA coaching wins in men's basketball history.

== Eligible conferences ==
The list of eligible conferences has always excluded all conferences that sponsor FBS football except for the MAC and the Sun Belt. The Atlantic 10 Conference, which has not sponsored football at all since 2006, has also been excluded throughout the award's history. Following major conference realignment that peaked in 2013, the WAC, which dropped football after the 2012 season, was added to the eligible list, while both offshoots of the original Big East Conference—the FBS American Athletic Conference and the current non-football Big East—were excluded from eligibility.

Definitions of the term "mid-major" in the context of college basketball vary widely. For purposes of both the Henson Award, Collegeinsider.com has established its own definition of the term, which includes members of the following conferences, as well as any basketball independents.

- America East Conference
- Atlantic Sun Conference
- Big Sky Conference
- Big South Conference
- Big West Conference
- Coastal Athletic Association
- Horizon League
- Ivy League
- Metro Atlantic Athletic Conference
- Mid-American Conference
- Mid-Eastern Athletic Conference
- Missouri Valley Conference
- Northeast Conference
- Ohio Valley Conference
- Patriot League
- Southern Conference
- Southland Conference
- Southwestern Athletic Conference
- Summit League
- Sun Belt Conference
- West Coast Conference
- Western Athletic Conference

== Key ==
Player (X)	Denotes the number of times the player has been awarded the Lou Henson Award at that point

== Winners ==
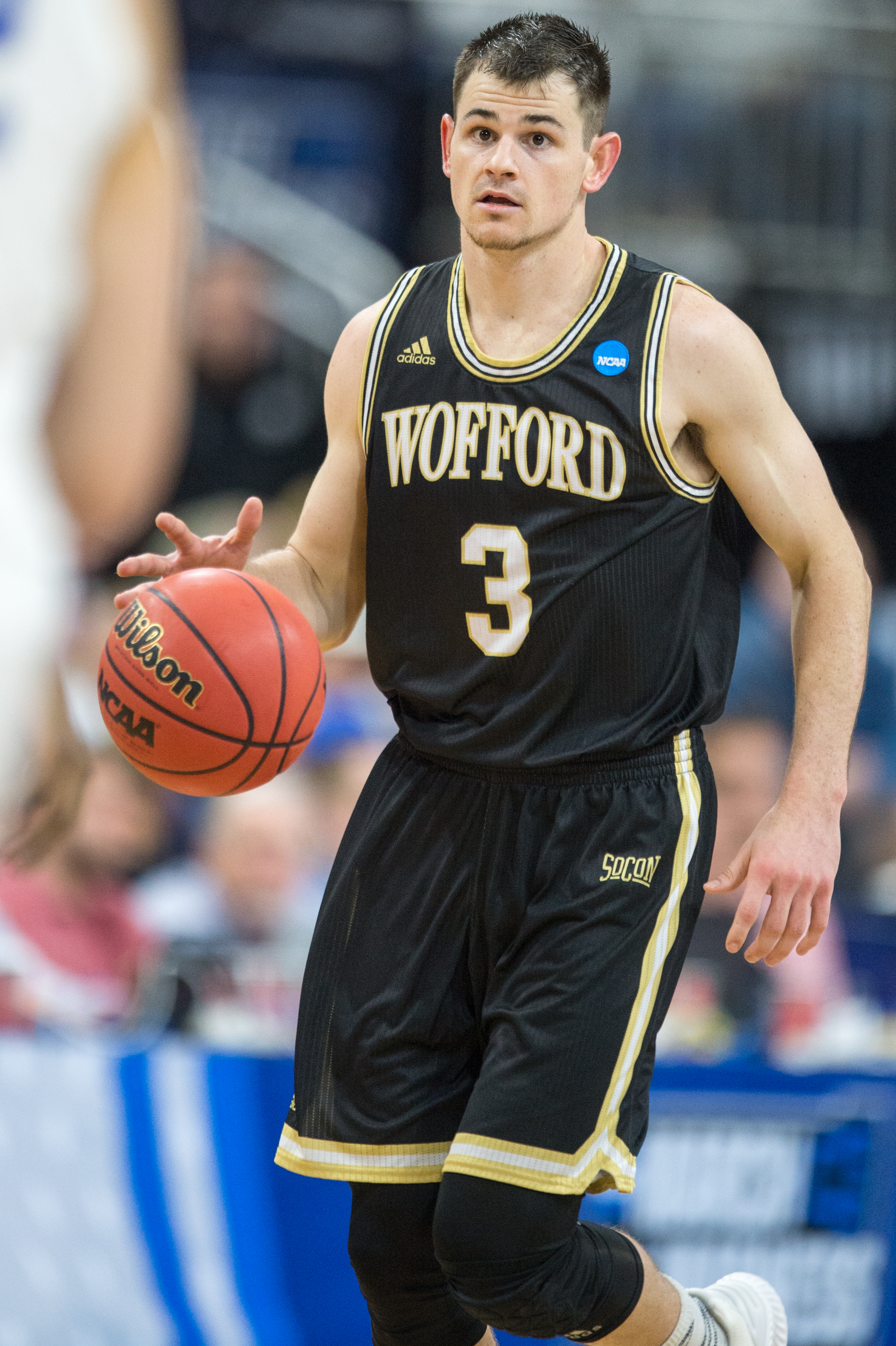
Fletcher Magee, Wofford, 2018

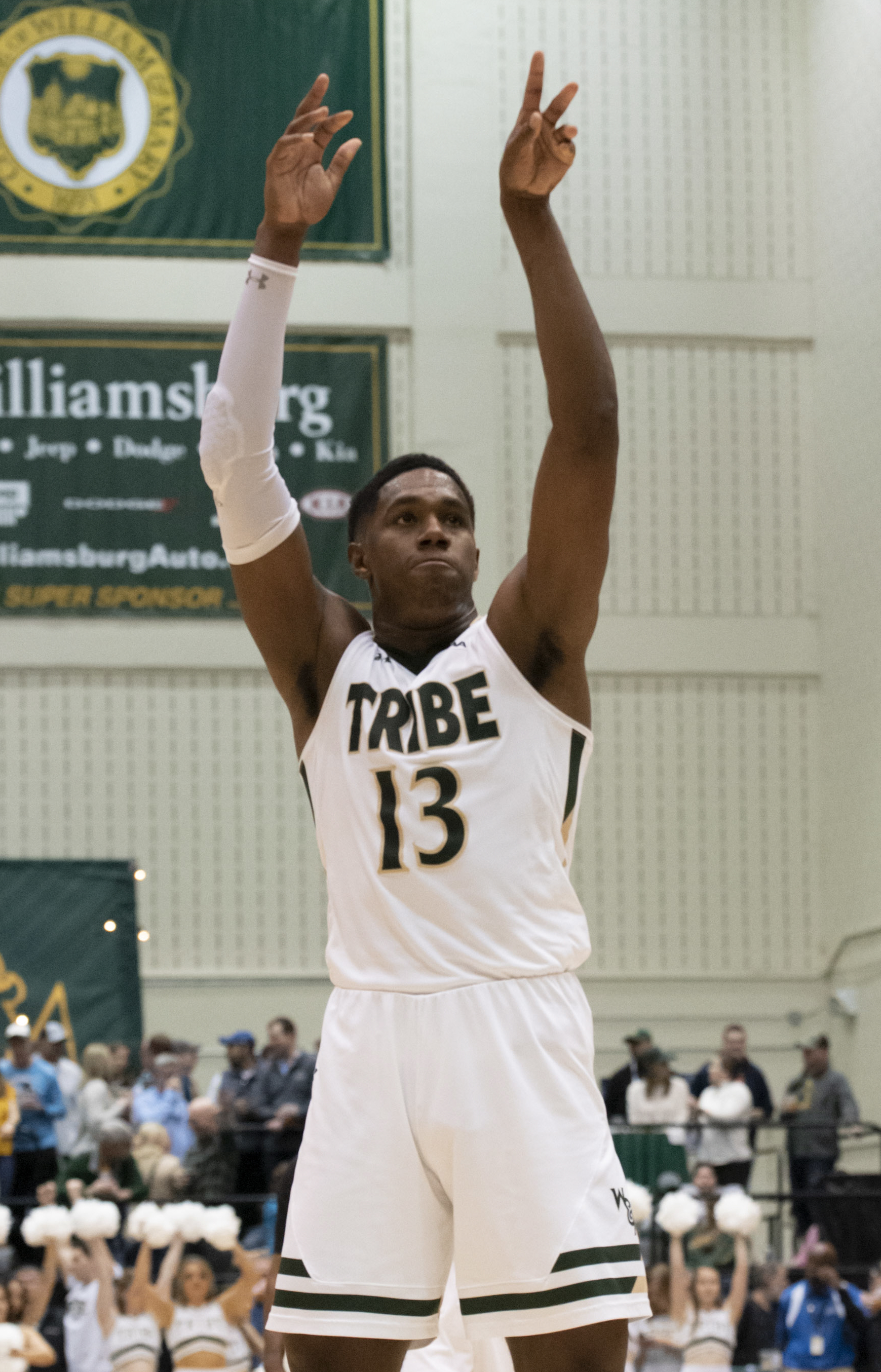
Nathan Knight, William & Mary, 2020

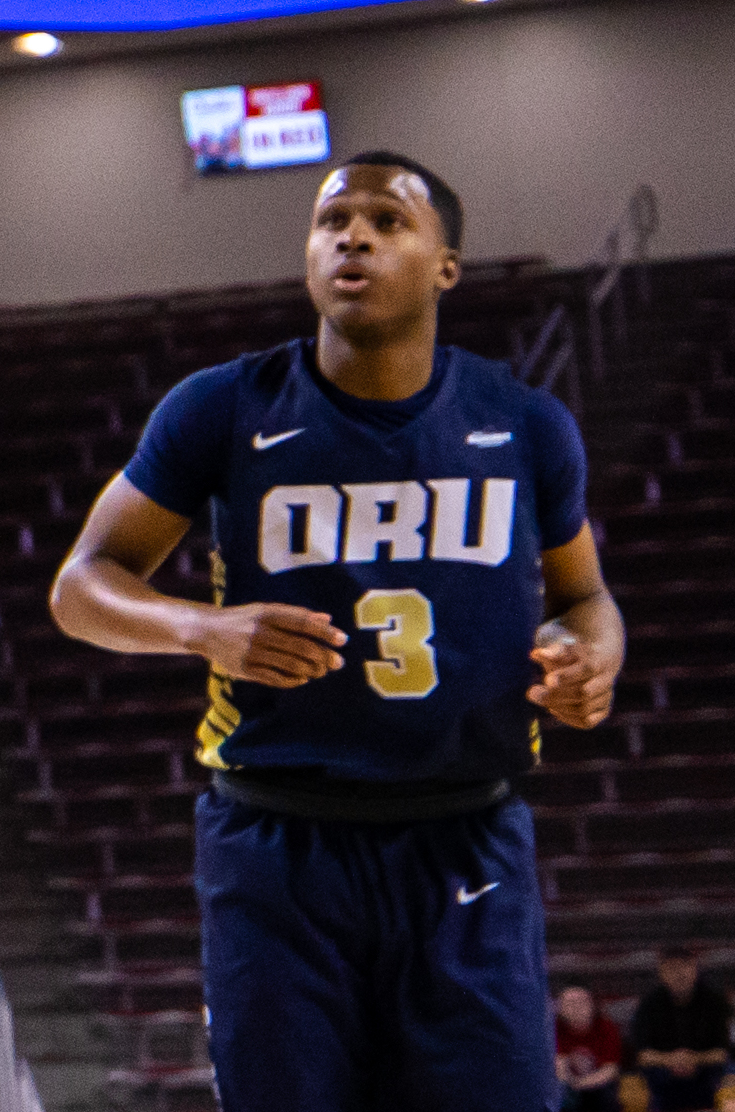
Max Abmas, Oral Roberts, 2021

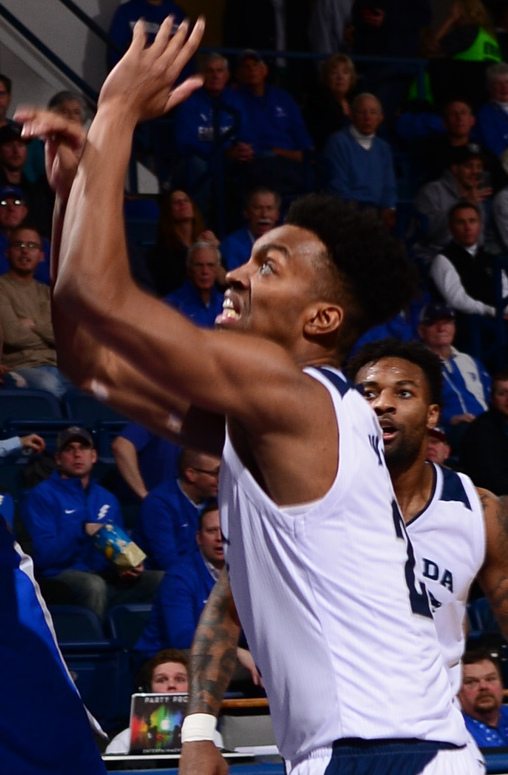
Jordan Brown, Louisiana, 2023

Year	Player	School	Position	Class	Reference
2009–10	Keith Benson	Oakland	C	Junior	
2010–11	Matt Howard	Butler	PF	Senior	
2011–12	Kyle O'Quinn	Norfolk State	PF	Senior	
2012–13	Matthew Dellavedova	Saint Mary's	PG	Senior	
2013–14	Langston Hall	Mercer	PG	Senior	
2014–15	Ty Greene	USC Upstate	PG	Senior	
2015–16	Thomas Walkup	Stephen F. Austin	SG	Senior	
2016–17	Justin Robinson	Monmouth	PG	Senior	
2017–18	Clayton Custer	Loyola (Illinois)	PG	Junior	
2018–19	Fletcher Magee	Wofford	SG	Senior	
2019–20	Nathan Knight	William & Mary	PF / C	Senior	
2020–21	Max Abmas	Oral Roberts	G	Sophomore	
2021–22	Malachi Smith	Chattanooga	SG	Junior	
2022–23	Jordan Brown	Louisiana	C	Junior	
2023–24	Trey Townsend	Oakland	SF	Junior	
2024–25	Brian Moore Jr.	Norfolk State	SG	Senior	
2025–26	Austin Benigni	Navy	PG	Senior	
