= 2025–26 Navy Midshipmen men's basketball team =

American college basketball season

2025–26 Navy Midshipmen men's basketball

Patriot League regular season champions

NIT, First Round
- Conference: Patriot League
- Record: 26–8 (17–1 Patriot)
- Head coach: Jon Perry (1st season)
- Assistant coaches: Zack Curran; Brett Barron; Jordan Lyons; Chase Coleman; Scott Wagers
- Home arena: Alumni Hall

2025–26 Patriot League men's basketball standings
| | Conf. | | | | Overall |
| Team | W | | L | PCT | W | | L | PCT |
|---|---|---|---|---|---|---|---|---|
| Navy | 17 | – | 1 | .944 | 26 | – | 8 | .765 |
| Lehigh † | 11 | – | 7 | .611 | 18 | – | 17 | .514 |
| Colgate | 11 | – | 7 | .611 | 18 | – | 15 | .545 |
| Boston University | 10 | – | 8 | .556 | 17 | – | 17 | .500 |
| American | 9 | – | 9 | .500 | 16 | – | 16 | .500 |
| Loyola | 8 | – | 10 | .444 | 12 | – | 20 | .375 |
| Lafayette | 8 | – | 10 | .444 | 11 | – | 21 | .344 |
| Bucknell | 6 | – | 12 | .333 | 10 | – | 23 | .303 |
| Army | 5 | – | 13 | .278 | 11 | – | 21 | .344 |
| Holy Cross | 5 | – | 13 | .278 | 11 | – | 22 | .333 |
† 2026 Patriot League tournament winner

The 2025–26 Navy Midshipmen men's basketball team represented the United States Naval Academy during the 2025–26 NCAA Division I men's basketball season. The Midshipmen, led by first-year head coach Jon Perry, played their home games at Alumni Hall in Annapolis, Maryland as members of the Patriot League.

With their win over Lehigh on February 18, the Midshipmen clinched the Patriot League's regular-season title for the first time since 2000, and their first outright title since 1997. Navy finished the regular season with a 25–6 overall record and a 17–1 conference record, with both finishes being their best since joining the Patriot League in 1992. Navy defeated 8–seed Bucknell in the quarterfinals of the Patriot League tournament before losing to Boston University in the semifinals. The Midshipmen would lose in the first round of the NIT to Wake Forest.

== Previous season ==
The Midshipmen finished the 2024–25 season 15–19, 10–8 in Patriot League play, to finish in a four-way tie for third place. They defeated Boston University and upset top-seeded Bucknell, before falling to American in the Patriot League tournament championship game.

On March 19, 2025, longtime head coach Ed DeChellis announced his retirement, after leading the Midshipmen for 14 seasons, with associate head coach Jon Perry being named interim head coach. On April 2, the school removed in the interim title and officially named Perry as DeChellis' successor.

== Preseason ==
On October 15, 2025, the Patriot League released their preseason poll. Navy was picked to finish first in the conference, while receiving seven first-place votes.

=== Preseason rankings ===
Patriot League Preseason Poll
| Place | Team | Points |
|---|---|---|
| 1 | Navy | 79 (7) |
| 2 | Boston University | 73 (2) |
| 3 | Colgate | 64 (1) |
| 4 | American | 47 |
| 5 | Bucknell | 44 |
| 6 | Loyola (MD) | 39 |
| 7 | Lafayette | 36 |
| 8 | Lehigh | 30 |
| 9 | Holy Cross | 23 |
| 10 | Army | 15 |
(#) first-place votes

=== Preseason Player of the Year ===
Preseason Player of the Year
| Player | Year | Position |
|---|---|---|
| Austin Benigni | Senior | Guard |

=== Preseason All-Patriot League Team ===
Preseason All-Patriot League Team
| Player | Year | Position |
|---|---|---|
| Austin Benigni | Senior | Guard |

== Roster ==
2025–26 Navy Midshipmen men's basketball team
Players
Coaches

| Pos. | # | Name | Height | Weight | Year | Previous school | Hometown |
|---|---|---|---|---|---|---|---|
| G | 0 | Nyles Howard | 6 ft 4 in (1.93 m) | 191 lb (87 kg) | Jr | Carmel Christian School | Concord, North Carolina |
| G | 1 | Austin Benigni | 5 ft 11 in (1.8 m) | 171 lb (78 kg) | Sr | The Woodlands Christian Academy | The Woodlands, Texas |
| G | 2 | Cam Cole | 6 ft 2 in (1.88 m) | 173 lb (78 kg) | Jr | Highland School | Bristow, Virginia |
| G | 3 | Julian Gabbidon | 6 ft 3 in (1.91 m) | 195 lb (88 kg) | Jr | Trinity High School | Harrisburg, Pennsylvania |
| G | 7 | David Burnett | 6 ft 4 in (1.93 m) | 200 lb (91 kg) | So | Buford High School | Flowery Branch, Georgia |
| G | 8 | Sam Krist | 6 ft 5 in (1.96 m) | 190 lb (86 kg) | Sr | Rockford High School | Rockford, Michigan |
| F | 9 | Reiss Whitaker | 6 ft 7 in (2.01 m) | 211 lb (96 kg) | Jr | Highland School | Haymarket, Virginia |
| G | 10 | Jinwoo Kim | 6 ft 3 in (1.91 m) | 195 lb (88 kg) | Jr | Blue Valley Southwest High School | Overland Park, Kansas |
| F | 11 | Donovan Draper | 6 ft 6 in (1.98 m) | 207 lb (94 kg) | Sr | Forest Hill High School | West Palm Beach, Florida |
| G | 14 | Cam Cormany | 6 ft 0 in (1.83 m) | 183 lb (83 kg) | Sr | Radford High School | Radford, Virginia |
| G | 16 | Julien King | 6 ft 2 in (1.88 m) | 199 lb (90 kg) | So | GRACE Christian School | Garner, North Carolina |
| G | 18 | Davyn de Jongh | 6 ft 1 in (1.85 m) | 170 lb (77 kg) | So | Hotchkiss School | New York, New York |
| G | 20 | Matt Gaffney | 5 ft 11 in (1.8 m) | 170 lb (77 kg) | Fr | Malden Catholic High School | Wakefield, Massachusetts |
| G | 21 | Jordan Pennick | 6 ft 0 in (1.83 m) | 195 lb (88 kg) | Jr | Archbishop Spalding High School | Reisterstown, Maryland |
| F | 22 | Colin Pollock | 6 ft 8 in (2.03 m) | 215 lb (98 kg) | Fr | St. Stephen's & St. Agnes School | Ashburn, Virginia |
| G | 24 | Steven McLeod | 6 ft 1 in (1.85 m) | 181 lb (82 kg) | Fr | GRACE Christian School | Durham, North Carolina |
| F | 25 | Jerry Ashley Jr. | 6 ft 8 in (2.03 m) | 225 lb (102 kg) | Fr | Bishop Verot High School | Cape Coral, Florida |
| F | 30 | Mike Woods | 6 ft 4 in (1.93 m) | 211 lb (96 kg) | Sr | Douglass High School | Upper Marlboro, Maryland |
| C | 32 | Jordan McConnell | 6 ft 10 in (2.08 m) | 235 lb (107 kg) | Fr | Phillips Exeter Academy | Hanover, New Hampshire |
| F | 33 | Tobi Raji | 6 ft 7 in (2.01 m) | 214 lb (97 kg) | So | Eleanor Roosevelt High School | Greenbelt, Maryland |
| F | 35 | Luke Morgan | 6 ft 8 in (2.03 m) | 200 lb (91 kg) | Fr | Wesleyan Christian Academy | Asheboro, North Carolina |
| F | 40 | C.J. Kearns | 6 ft 8 in (2.03 m) | 215 lb (98 kg) | Fr | Rockledge High School | Rockledge, Florida |
| F | 42 | Cooper Jackson | 6 ft 7 in (2.01 m) | 228 lb (103 kg) | So | Reagan High School | Lewisville, North Carolina |
| F | 77 | Owen Gray | 6 ft 9 in (2.06 m) | 226 lb (103 kg) | So | Steward School | Rockville, Virginia |
| C | 99 | Aidan Kehoe | 6 ft 11 in (2.11 m) | 246 lb (112 kg) | Sr | Pascack Hills High School | Montvale, New Jersey |

Head coach

- Jon Perry (East Tennessee State)

Assistant coach(es)

- Brett Barron (DeSales)
- Chase Coleman (Virginia)
- Zack Curran (Virginia Tech)
- Jordan Lyons (Furman)
- Scott Wagers (Tennessee Wesleyan)

Legend

- (C) Team captain
- (S) Suspended
- (I) Ineligible
- (W) Walk-on
- Injured
- Current redshirt

Roster
Last update: November 24, 2025

== Schedule and results ==
| Date time, TV | Rank^{#} | Opponent^{#} | Result | Record | High points | High rebounds | High assists | Site (attendance) city, state |
Non-conference regular season
| November 3, 2025*; 7:00 pm, ESPN+ | | at Presbyterian | W 76–55 | 1–0 | 19 – Kehoe | 6 – Kim | 5 – Benigni | Templeton Center (471); Clinton, SC |
| November 7, 2025*; 8:30 pm, CBSSN | | Yale; Veterans Classic | L 68–97 | 1–1 | 16 – Kim | 9 – Draper | 4 – Benigni | Alumni Hall (1,958); Annapolis, MD |
| November 11, 2025*; 6:30 pm, BTN | | at Penn State | L 71–80 | 1–2 | 25 – Kim | 12 – Draper | 8 – Benigni | Bryce Jordan Center (5,772); State College, PA |
| November 14, 2025*; 6:00 pm, ESPN+ | | Washington (MD) | W 97–64 | 2–2 | 20 – Kehoe | 9 – Draper | 6 – Draper | Alumni Hall (854); Annapolis, MD |
| November 18, 2025*; 7:00 pm, ACCN | | at No. 18 North Carolina | L 61–73 | 2–3 | 19 – Benigni | 8 – Kehoe | 5 – Benigni | Dean Smith Center (16,869); Chapel Hill, NC |
| November 22, 2025*; 12:00 pm, ESPN+ | | NJIT | W 86–70 | 3–3 | 21 – Kehoe | 12 – Kehoe | 4 – Benigni | Alumni Hall (784); Annapolis, MD |
| November 26, 2025*; 4:00 pm, FloCollege | | vs. Gardner–Webb; Live Oak Bank Holiday Classic | W 84–51 | 4–3 | 20 – Kehoe | 14 – Kehoe | 6 – Benigni | Trask Coliseum (4,246); Wilmington, NC |
| November 28, 2025*; 3:00 pm, FloCollege | | at UNC Wilmington; Live Oak Bank Holiday Classic | L 57–87 | 4–4 | 25 – Benigni | 7 – Kehoe | 3 – Benigni | Trask Coliseum (5,220); Wilmington, NC |
| November 29, 2025*; 12:00 pm, FloCollege | | vs. Southeastern Louisiana; Live Oak Bank Holiday Classic | L 65–69 | 4–5 | 24 – Benigni | 7 – Draper | 5 – Draper | Trask Coliseum (4,119); Wilmington, NC |
| December 3, 2025*; 7:00 pm, ESPN+ | | at Delaware State | W 66–59 | 5–5 | 18 – Woods | 14 – Kehoe | 4 – Benigni | Memorial Hall (300); Dover, DE |
| December 7, 2025*; 12:00 pm, ESPN+ | | Air Force; Rivalry | W 61–56 | 6–5 | 25 – Benigni | 15 – Kehoe | 5 – Benigni | Alumni Hall (1,928); Annapolis, MD |
| December 19, 2025*; 5:00 pm, ESPN+ | | Coppin State | W 88–55 | 7–5 | 22 – Kehoe | 12 – Kehoe | 6 – Benigni | Alumni Hall (724); Annapolis, MD |
| December 21, 2025*; 12:00 pm, ESPN+ | | Rosemont | W 70–23 | 8–5 | 15 – Draper | 11 – Woods | 5 – Woods | Alumni Hall (770); Annapolis, MD |
Patriot League regular season
| December 31, 2025; 1:00 pm, ESPN+ | | Boston University | W 82–77 | 9–5 (1–0) | 27 – Benigni | 15 – Kehoe | 8 – Benigni | Alumni Hall (1,213); Annapolis, MD |
| January 3, 2026; 2:00 pm, ESPN+ | | at Holy Cross | W 65–58 | 10–5 (2–0) | 23 – Benigni | 9 – Kehoe | 5 – Benigni | Hart Center (1,391); Worcester, MA |
| January 7, 2026; 7:00 pm, ESPN+ | | Bucknell | W 76–55 | 11–5 (3–0) | 23 – Benigni | 12 – Kehoe | 7 – Cole | Alumni Hall (758); Annapolis, MD |
| January 10, 2026; 2:00 pm, ESPN+ | | Lafayette | W 76–50 | 12–5 (4–0) | 23 – Kehoe | 11 – Kehoe | 4 – Benigni | Alumni Hall (1,953); Annapolis, MD |
| January 12, 2026; 7:00 pm, CBSSN | | at American | L 51–65 | 12–6 (4–1) | 13 – Cole | 15 – Kehoe | 3 – Tied | Bender Arena (1,314); Washington, D.C. |
| January 17, 2026; 2:00 pm, ESPN+ | | at Lehigh | W 82–79 ^{2OT} | 13–6 (5–1) | 34 – Benigni | 21 – Kehoe | 4 – Kehoe | Stabler Arena (689); Bethlehem, PA |
| January 21, 2026; 7:00 pm, ESPN+ | | Holy Cross | W 85–68 | 14–6 (6–1) | 29 – Kehoe | 7 – Kehoe | 7 – Draper | Alumni Hall (855); Annapolis, MD |
| January 24, 2026; 1:30 pm, CBSSN | | Army | W 84–56 | 15–6 (7–1) | 19 – Benigni | 11 – Kehoe | 7 – Cole | Alumni Hall (4,731); Annapolis, MD |
| January 28, 2026; 7:00 pm, ESPN+ | | at Boston University | W 58–50 | 16–6 (8–1) | 20 – Benigni | 9 – Kehoe | 4 – Benigni | Case Gym (663); Boston, MA |
| January 31, 2026; 4:00 pm, ESPN+ | | Loyola (MD) | W 87–71 | 17–6 (9–1) | 23 – Kehoe | 7 – Kehoe | 5 – Benigni | Alumni Hall (2,417); Annapolis, MD |
| February 4, 2026; 7:00 pm, ESPN+ | | at Lafayette | W 65–50 | 18–6 (10–1) | 17 – Draper | 15 – Kehoe | 7 – Kehoe | Kirby Sports Center (1,306); Easton, PA |
| February 7, 2026; 4:00 pm, ESPN+ | | American | W 82–73 | 19–6 (11–1) | 22 – Kehoe | 14 – Draper | 5 – Draper | Alumni Hall (2,241); Annapolis, MD |
| February 9, 2026; 6:00 pm, CBSSN | | at Bucknell | W 76–60 | 20–6 (12–1) | 26 – Kehoe | 12 – Kehoe | 5 – Cole | Sojka Pavilion (1,417); Lewisburg, PA |
| February 14, 2026; 2:00 pm, ESPN+ | | at Colgate | W 84–80 ^{OT} | 21–6 (13–1) | 22 – Pennick | 10 – Kehoe | 5 – Benigni | Cotterell Court; Hamilton, NY |
| February 18, 2026; 7:00 pm, ESPN+ | | Lehigh | W 72–49 | 22–6 (14–1) | 25 – Benigni | 15 – Kehoe | 7 – Benigni | Alumni Hall (1,392); Annapolis, MD |
| February 21, 2026; 1:30 pm, CBSSN | | at Army | W 81–63 | 23–6 (15–1) | 27 – Benigni | 11 – Kehoe | 4 – Draper | Christl Arena (3,968); West Point, NY |
| February 25, 2026; 7:00 pm, ESPN+ | | at Loyola (MD) | W 78–51 | 24–6 (16–1) | 25 – Kim | 16 – Kehoe | 6 – Kehoe | Reitz Arena (714); Baltimore, MD |
| February 28, 2026; 4:00 pm, ESPN+ | | Colgate | W 85–69 | 25–6 (17–1) | 17 – Kehoe | 12 – Kehoe | 9 – Beningi | Alumni Hall (2,428); Annapolis, MD |
Patriot League tournament
| March 5, 2026; 7:00 pm, ESPN+ | (1) | (8) Bucknell; Quarterfinals | W 74–69 | 26–6 | 16 – Cole | 7 – Kehoe | 4 – Pennick | Alumni Hall (1,209); Annapolis, MD |
| March 8, 2026; 2:00 pm, CBSSN | (1) | (4) Boston University; Semifinals | L 72–73 | 26–7 | 26 – Kehoe | 12 – Kehoe | 6 – Benigni | Alumni Hall (1,722); Annapolis, MD |
NIT
| March 18, 2026*; 7:00 p.m., ESPNU | | at (1 WS) Wake Forest; First Round | L 72–82 | 26–8 | 19 – Benigni | 10 – Kehoe | 4 – Benigni | LJVM Coliseum (1,823); Winston-Salem, NC |
*Non-conference game. ^{#}Rankings from AP Poll. (#) Tournament seedings in parentheses. WS=Winston-Salem. All times are in Eastern.
