= Navy Midshipmen men's basketball =

Sports team of the United States Naval Academy

2026–27 Navy Midshipmen men's basketball team
- Institution: United States Naval Academy
- Head coach: Jon Perry (2nd season)
- Location: Annapolis, Maryland
- Arena: Alumni Hall (capacity: 5,710)
- Conference: Patriot
- Nickname: Midshipmen
- Colors: Navy blue and gold
- Student section: TBD

NCAA Division I tournament Elite Eight
- 1947, 1954, 1986
Other NCAA Division I tournament results
Sweet Sixteen	1954, 1959, 1986
Appearances	1947, 1953, 1954, 1959, 1960, 1985, 1986, 1987, 1994, 1997, 1998

Pre-tournament Helms national champions
- 1913

Conference tournament champions
- CAA: 1985, 1986, 1987; Patriot: 1994, 1997, 1998

Conference regular-season champions
- CAA: 1985, 1986, 1987; Patriot: 1994, 1996, 1997, 1998, 2000, 2026

Conference division champions
- Patriot South: 2021

Uniforms
Home	Away

The Navy Midshipmen men's basketball team represents the United States Naval Academy, in Annapolis, Maryland, in NCAA Division I college basketball. The team competes in the Patriot League and plays its home games in Alumni Hall.

The U.S. Naval Academy began varsity intercollegiate competition in men's basketball in the 1907–08 season. Navy was retroactively listed as the pre-NCAA tournament national champion for the 1912–13 season by the Helms Athletic Foundation and was retroactively listed as the country's best college team for the 1912–13 and 1918–19 seasons by the Premo-Porretta Power Poll. While the NCAA lists the historical Helms selections for reference, the Helms selections are not officially recognized as NCAA national championships, and the NCAA does not acknowledge the Premo-Porretta rankings. The Midshipmen have appeared 11 times in the NCAA Tournament, most recently in 1998.

== Early history ==
The Navy Midshipmen men's basketball program began play in the early 20th century, quickly establishing itself as one of the nation's top teams. In the pre-NCAA Tournament era, the 1913 team was retroactively recognized by the Helms Athletic Foundation, finishing with a perfect 9–0 record. In addition, the 1919 squad posted a 10–0 mark and was retroactively ranked as the country's top team by Premo-Porretta. These early successes laid the foundation for Navy's long-standing basketball tradition.

=== Tournament success (1986–2004) ===
Pete Herrmann served as head coach of the Navy Midshipmen men's basketball team from 1986 to 1992, succeeding Paul Evans. In his first season, he led the Midshipmen to a 26–6 record, winning both the Colonial Athletic Association (CAA) regular season and tournament titles, and earning a berth in the NCAA Tournament. The season also marked the final collegiate campaign for All-American and future hall of fame center David Robinson, who was selected first overall in the 1987 NBA Draft.

In 1992, Don DeVoe succeeded Herrmann as head coach and held the position from 1992 to 2004. During his 12 seasons, DeVoe amassed a 184–161 record and led the Midshipmen to five Patriot League regular season titles and three Patriot League tournament championships. Under his leadership, Navy earned NCAA tournament berths in 1994, 1997, and 1998. DeVoe was named Patriot League Coach of the Year in 1994, 1997, and 2000.

=== Present-day success (2020–present) ===
During the 2020–21 season, under head coach Ed DeChellis and assistant coach John Perry, the Navy Midshipmen men's basketball team posted a 15–3 overall record and went 12–1 in Patriot League play, winning the Patriot League South Division title. The Midshipmen secured the No. 1 overall seed in the Patriot League Tournament for the first time since the 1996–97 season, but were upset in the quarterfinals by No. 9 seed Loyola (Maryland).

In the 2024–25 season, Navy advanced to the Patriot League Tournament championship game as the No. 5 seed after upsetting top-seeded Bucknell in the semifinals, but fell to No. 2 seed American University, 74–52, in the final. Following the season, Ed DeChellis retired after 14 seasons, and Jon Perry was promoted to head coach.

In the 2025–26 season, Navy led by Austin Benigni, clinched the Patriot League's regular-season title for the first time since 2000, and their first outright title since 1997. However, the season would come to a close in an Patriot League Tournament semi-finals upset against No. 4 seed Boston University 73–72.

== Postseason history ==
=== NCAA tournament results ===
The Midshipmen have appeared in the NCAA tournament 11 times and made regional finals (the "Elite Eight") in 1947, 1954 and 1986. Their overall tournament record is 8–12.

Year	Seed	Round	Opponent	Result
1947		Quarterfinals; Regional 3rd-place game	Holy Cross; Wisconsin	L 47–55; L 49–50
1953		First round	Holy Cross	L 74–87
1954		First round Sweet Sixteen; Elite Eight	Connecticut; Cornell; La Salle	W 85–80; W 69–67; L 48–64
1959		Regional Quarterfinals; Regional semifinals Regional 3rd-place game	North Carolina; Boston U. Saint Joseph's	W 76–63; L 55–62; W 70–56
1960		Regional Quarterfinals	West Virginia	L 86–94
1985	13	First round Second Round	(4) LSU (5) Maryland	W 78–55; L 59–64
1986	7	First round Second Round; Sweet Sixteen; Elite Eight	(10) Tulsa (2) Syracuse (14) Cleveland State (1) Duke	W 87–68; W 97–85; W 71–70; L 50–71
1987	8	First round	(9) Michigan	L 82–97
1994	16	First round	(1) Missouri	L 53–76
1997	15	First round	(2) Utah	L 61–75
1998	16	First round	(1) North Carolina	L 52–88

=== NIT results ===
The Midshipmen have appeared in two National Invitation Tournaments. Their record is 0–2.

Year	Round	Opponent	Result
1962	First round	Duquesne	L 58–70
2026	First round	Wake Forest	L 72–82

== Conference tournament championships ==
=== Patriot League tournament ===
See: Patriot League men's basketball tournament

- 1994: tournament champion (tournament MVP: T.J. Hall)
- 1997: tournament champion (tournament MVP: Hassan Booker)
- 1998: tournament champion (tournament MVP: Skip Victor)

=== Colonial Athletic Association tournament ===
See: Colonial Athletic Association#History of the Tournament Final

- 1985: tournament champion (tournament MVP: Vernon Butler)
- 1986: tournament champion (tournament MVP: David Robinson)
- 1987: tournament champion (tournament MVP: David Robinson)

== Awards and honors ==
=== Colonial Athletic Association Men's Basketball Player of the Year ===
- 1984–85 – David Robinson
- 1985–86 – David Robinson
- 1986–87 – David Robinson

=== Patriot League Men's Basketball Player of the Year ===
- 2007–08 – Greg Sprink
- 2025–26 – Austin Benigni

== Athletic Hall of Fame ==
For basketball players in the USNA Athletic Hall of Fame, see footnote

The Athletic Hall of Fame is housed in Lejeune Hall. Among the exhibits is the Eastman Award won by David Robinson in 1987.

== Notable players ==
- Laurence Wild (1913) – Later head coach of the team, and the 30th Governor of American Samoa.
- Brian Gregory (1985–86) – General Manager for the Phoenix Suns
- David Robinson (1983–87) – two-time NBA champion and a 2009 inductee into the Basketball Hall of Fame; the CAA's all-time points leader (2,669); won college basketball's two most prestigious player awards, the Naismith and Wooden awards
- Doug Wojcik (1982–86) – a teammate of David Robinson; former head coach at the College of Charleston and Tulsa University. Associate HC at Michigan State Spartans men's basketball
