= Mid-major =

Classification of schools in U.S. college sports

Mid-major conferences in American college sports at the NCAA Division I level are athletic conferences that are not among the power conferences. The grouping is most commonly used in men's college basketball to describe conferences outside of the Big Ten, Big 12, SEC, ACC and Big East which have also been referred to as "high majors".

The term "mid-major" was coined in 1977 by Jack Kvancz, the head coach of men's basketball team at Catholic University of America. The NCAA neither acknowledges nor uses the terms "major" or "mid-major" to differentiate between Division I athletic conferences. Some schools and fans consider it offensive and derogatory, while others embrace the term.

When discussing College Football, Division I football conferences and teams are grouped into the Championship Subdivision (FCS), the Group of Six, or the power conferences (which in football comprise the Big Ten, Big 12, SEC and ACC). Generally, the Group of Six constitutes the equivalent of the mid-majors in college football (and may occasionally use that term interchangeably), as the FCS has its own NCAA-sanctioned playoff tournament and conference structure separate from the Bowl Subdivision that comprises the power conferences and Group of Six.

== Basketball ==
In college basketball, the term "mid-major" is used to refer to teams that are members of a conference other than the "power conferences" of the Big Ten, Big 12, Big East, SEC, and ACC. The Big East Conference does not sponsor football and thus is not considered a power conference in that sport, (Note: To that end, all but one of its members that sponsor football compete at the FCS level. All are affiliated with alternative conferences for the sport except for UConn, which competes as an FBS independent.) but is universally considered so in basketball, with the term "Power" sometimes used by media to describe the combination of the power football conferences and Big East. The NCAA has officially recognized this distinction in the selection process for the National Invitation Tournament, as these conferences each receive automatic bids for their two highest-ranked teams not invited to the NCAA Tournament, as ranked by the NCAA Evaluation Tool (NET).

Beyond that, one men's program outside of these conferences, Gonzaga (which joined the Pac-12 Conference in 2026 after over 40 years in the West Coast Conference), is now generally considered equivalent to a power program despite its mid-major affiliation. (Note: In a January 2019 story on the rise of Ja Morant from undisputed mid-major Murray State to (eventually) become the second pick in that year's NBA draft, Pat Forde, then of Yahoo Sports, argued that Gonzaga had not been a "true mid-major" since the first years of the 2000s. He specifically described Adam Morrison, picked third in the 2006 NBA draft, as "out of decided non-mid-major Gonzaga.") ESPN's Kevin Connors currently defines men's basketball mid-majors as "programs outside the top 7 conferences (Power Five, Big East, AAC) and Gonzaga". Another ESPN journalist, Jeff Borzello, referred to Gonzaga in 2022 as a "power conference" program. ESPN is not the only major media outlet that does not consider Gonzaga men's basketball to be a mid-major program; CBS Sports journalist Matt Norlander, in his 2022–23 season preview of mid-major conferences and programs, explicitly called Gonzaga "not a mid-major". In 2022, Gonzaga was reportedly in preliminary membership talks with three Power Six conferences—the Big East, Big 12, and Pac-12; after the Pac-12 lost all but two of its members (Oregon State and Washington State) in 2024, Gonzaga would accept membership in the reimagined Pac-12 effective in 2026–27.

Given the sustained success of many so-called "mid-major" conferences, and especially that of the Gonzaga program, higher profile conferences find it more difficult to distinguish themselves with the "mid-major" and "major" labels, unless one takes into account the distinction of being in now-defunct BCS football playing conference. However, only one team from what is now a mid-major conference has won a national championship since the tournament expanded to 64 teams—UNLV in 1990 as a member of the Big West Conference. (Note: The Big West's status as a "mid-major" in 1990 was debatable; it received three bids to that year's tournament.) (Louisville won national titles in 1980 and 1986 as a member of the Metro Conference, one of the precursors to Conference USA and arguably a major basketball conference of that day.)

== Football ==
Because of the development of the now-defunct Bowl Championship Series in 1998, and the lack of a playoff format for the Football Bowl Subdivision prior to the College Football Playoff, the demarcation line between major and mid-major conferences is much clearer in college football than in other sports. The six conferences of the BCS each had guaranteed appearances in one of the four major bowl games (Rose Bowl, Fiesta Bowl, Orange Bowl, and Sugar Bowl), whereas mid-majors — the teams that were not in one of those six leagues — relied on an at-large bid or a high ranking to qualify for a major bowl. (The Notre Dame Fighting Irish football team, an independent, was an exception due to being a member of the ACC in all other sports with the exception of men's hockey in which it is a member of the Big Ten.) It was rare for any mid-major program to receive one of two at-large bids (or only one, if Notre Dame qualified) to one of the four major bowls, even if such a program completed a perfect season. The establishment of the BCS National Championship Game opened two additional at-large berths and mandated invites for mid-major schools above a certain ranking, which led to an increase in mid-major appearances in the four major bowls. Then conference realignment brought about the split of the Big East football conference. Schools that did not join a major conference from the Big East renamed it the American Athletic Conference, now the American Conference (American), while several non-football schools left and founded a new conference, purchasing the "Big East" name from the newly renamed American. With the advent of the College Football Playoff in 2014, the non-Power Five FBS conferences are usually referred to as "Group of Five" conferences rather than mid-majors. No mid-major ever qualified for the BCS title game.

Only one mid-major team has won a national championship: the BYU Cougars, then in the Western Athletic Conference (renamed United Athletic Conference in 2026), won the 1984 championship on the strength of their perfect record and win in the 1984 Holiday Bowl. BYU largely won the championship by default, since no other team had held an undefeated record, and there were still lingering doubts about the team deserving the honor because it was in a lesser conference. Since the establishment of the Bowl Alliance (and its successors the Bowl Championship Series and College Football Playoff), no mid-major team had ever been selected for the championship game or tournament until the 2021 Cincinnati Bearcats, then of the American, were selected after an unbeaten regular season, becoming the only mid-major team to play in the CFP during its four-team era. The Bearcats were defeated in the opening (semifinal) round 27–6 by the Alabama Crimson Tide. In the first season of the 12-team CFP in 2024, then-Mountain West Conference member Boise State received a first-round bye as one of the four highest-ranked conference champions in the final CFP rankings.

Currently, the Group of Six football conferences are the American Conference (known as the American Athletic Conference before the 2025 season), Conference USA, the Mid-American Conference, the Mountain West Conference, the Pac-12 Conference, and the Sun Belt Conference. Since the 2024 collapse of the Pac-12, that league has generally been included with the other non-power conferences in a notional "Group of Six". Several conferences that no longer sponsor football were considered mid-majors; two that existed in the BCS era were the Big West Conference and the Western Athletic Conference (which resumed football competition in the Football Championship Subdivision in 2021 and was a partner in the FCS football-only United Athletic Conference through the 2025 season, with the WAC rebranding as the UAC in 2026).

Mid-major schools have compiled a record of 9–7 in the major bowl games since the 2004 football season. Since 2004, only the 2005 and 2011 seasons did not see a mid-major team in one of the major bowl games. The 2010 Fiesta Bowl featured two unbeaten mid-majors (Boise State and TCU); this is the only time two mid-majors have qualified for top-tier bowls. Prior to 2012, each of these teams entered its bowl undefeated, until Northern Illinois qualified following the 2012 season. UCF qualified for the January 2014 Fiesta Bowl (following the 2013 season), in the final year of the BCS, because the American Athletic Conference retained the Big East's automatic slot in the BCS. The current arrangement of the New Year's Six bowl games mandates that the highest-ranked Group of Five conference champion be awarded a New Year's Six bowl berth. This has been most recently invoked for the 2021 Cotton Bowl Classic, which featured a Cincinnati team that became the first Group of Five team to be selected to a College Football Playoff semifinal. The 2018 season saw a controversy that also involved UCF, which went on to win the 2018 Peach Bowl and end the season as the only undefeated FBS team. The Knights were denied a CFP bid in favor of four teams which had all lost one game (two of which, Georgia and Alabama, had lost by double digits to the same Auburn team that UCF had defeated in the Peach Bowl).

Date played	Winning team		Losing team		Bowl Game
January 1, 2005	#5 Utah	35	#19 Pittsburgh	7	2005 Fiesta Bowl
January 1, 2007	#9 Boise State	43	#7 Oklahoma	42 (OT)	2007 Fiesta Bowl
January 1, 2008	#5 Georgia	41	#10 Hawaiʻi	10	2008 Sugar Bowl
January 2, 2009	#6 Utah	31	#4 Alabama	17	2009 Sugar Bowl
January 4, 2010	#6 Boise State	17	#3 TCU	10	2010 Fiesta Bowl
January 1, 2011	#3 TCU	21	#4 Wisconsin	19	2011 Rose Bowl
January 1, 2013	#13 Florida State	31	#16 Northern Illinois	10	2013 Orange Bowl
December 31, 2014	#20 Boise State	38	#10 Arizona	30	2014 Fiesta Bowl (December)
December 31, 2015	#18 Houston	38	#9 Florida State	24	2015 Peach Bowl
January 2, 2017	#8 Wisconsin	24	#12 Western Michigan	16	2017 Cotton Bowl Classic
January 1, 2018	#12 UCF	34	#7 Auburn	27	2018 Peach Bowl
January 1, 2019	#11 LSU	40	#7 UCF	32	2019 Fiesta Bowl
December 28, 2019	#13 Penn State	53	#15 Memphis	39	2019 Cotton Bowl Classic
January 1, 2021	#9 Georgia	24	#8 Cincinnati	21	2021 Peach Bowl
December 31, 2021	#1 Alabama	27	#4 Cincinnati	6	2021 Cotton Bowl Classic
January 2, 2023	#16 Tulane	46	#10 USC	45	2023 Cotton Bowl Classic
January 1, 2024	#8 Oregon	45	#23 Liberty	6	2024 Fiesta Bowl (January)
December 31, 2024	#4 Penn State	31	#9 Boise State	14	2024 Fiesta Bowl (December)

The American Conference and Mountain West Conference have so far been the most successful of the group conferences at placing their champions in major bowls, respectively doing so eight and six times. However, four of the MW's appearances were in the BCS era, when the conference now operating as the American was known as the Big East and was a primary BCS partner. The Western Athletic Conference, which no longer sponsors FBS football, (Note: The WAC reinstated football in 2021, but the conference competed in the second-tier Division I FCS through the 2022 season. In 2023, it merged its football league with that of another FCS league, the Atlantic Sun Conference, to establish the football-only version of the United Athletic Conference.) has done so three times; of the two programs that went to major bowls as WAC champions, Boise State moved from the MW to the Pac-12 in 2026 and Hawaiʻi has played MW football since 2012, initially as an affiliate before upgrading to full MW membership in 2026. The Mid-American Conference has done so once in the BCS era and once in the CFP era, and Conference USA has done so once in the CFP era. The Sun Belt Conference has never qualified a champion for a BCS or New Year's Six bowl. The only team from the group conferences to have reached a major bowl since the 2024 expansion of the CFP is the aforementioned 2024 Boise State team (MW); the American and SBC each qualified one team to the 2025 CFP.

The mid-major team that has qualified for the most major bowl games is Boise State with four appearances, twice each in the WAC and MW. UCF qualified three times while in the American. Cincinnati, TCU, and Utah have each done so twice. (Note: While Cincinnati reached two major bowl games in the BCS era, it was then a member of the Big East, which was a primary BCS partner.) Cincinnati, TCU, UCF, and Utah are now members of "power conferences"—TCU is now in the Big 12, qualified for the 2014 Peach Bowl and played for the national championship following the 2022 season while there; Utah, which joined the Pac-12 in 2011 and moved to the Big 12 in 2024, played in the Rose Bowl in 2022 and 2023; and Cincinnati and UCF joined the Big 12 in 2023.

Before the 2023 departure of Cincinnati, Houston, and UCF for the Big 12, the American was widely considered the best football conference that was not among the power conferences. Since its reorganization and split from the Big East Conference in 2013 (and its corresponding expulsion from "BCS conference" status), they have sent five programs to New Year's Six bowl games: Houston in 2015, UCF in 2013, 2017, and 2018, Memphis in 2019, Cincinnati in 2020 and 2021, and Tulane in 2022. These programs have gone 4–4 in the games played to date. USF, UCF, Houston, Navy, Cincinnati, SMU, and Memphis, all either current or former American Conference teams, are very successful programs in FBS play. In 2017, UCF was the first team from the American to go undefeated; its schedule included two wins against Memphis (whose only two regular season losses came to UCF and was otherwise undefeated) and a win against USF (which had only one other loss besides UCF), and the team won its bowl game against #7 Auburn, a team which had beaten both CFP championship game teams (Alabama and Georgia) that year. The Knights also completed an unbeaten regular season in 2018, but lost to LSU in their bowl game after having lost McKenzie Milton, the quarterback who had led them in both 2017 and 2018, to a catastrophic knee injury in their final regularly scheduled game. Cincinnati also entered its bowl games unbeaten in both 2020 and 2021, but lost both times, narrowly to Georgia in 2020 and more convincingly to Alabama in 2021. However, Cincinnati, Houston, and UCF joined the Big 12 in 2023, and SMU joined the ACC in 2024.

The bowl game to host the most mid-major conference champions is the Fiesta Bowl, which has hosted at least one such team eight times, with the 2010 edition (2009 season) involving two mid-majors. The Cotton Bowl Classic has featured a mid-major champion four times, and the Peach Bowl has done so three times, with all such games for both bowls taking place in the CFP era. The Sugar Bowl did so twice in the BCS era. The Rose Bowl Game and Orange Bowl each did so once in the BCS era.

== Swimming ==
Since 2002, CollegeSwimming.com has produced an objective ranking system for Mid-Major, Division I swimming programs. Initiated by Clark Campbell, the poll has been used to provide attention to teams that were often targeted for elimination ostensibly for Title IX or budgetary reasons. Swimming, along with most other NCAA sports, fundamentally differs in its financial model from the so-called "revenue sports" of basketball and Division I FBS football. The NCAA classifies the latter two sports as "head-count" sports, which means that the total number of players that can receive any athletically related financial aid from the school is limited. Because a partial scholarship counts fully against the head count, it means that in practice, scholarships are almost always awarded as full grants-in-aid. On the other hand, the NCAA classifies swimming as an "equivalency" sport, meaning that scholarships can be divided among a number of student-athletes. CollegeSwimming.com's definition of a mid-major institution takes this into account. Though the lineup has changed, institutions eligible for the CollegeSwimming.com poll are those institutions that a) are not members of a Power Five conference, American Athletic Conference, Mountain West Conference, or Western Athletic Conference; or b) provide fewer than one-half of the allowable scholarships under the NCAA rules.

Past Champions	Women	Men
2016-17	Yale University University of Denver (tie)	Harvard University
2015-16	Harvard University	University of Denver
2014-15	Princeton University	San Diego State University
2013-14	Harvard University	San Diego State University
2012-13	Harvard University	Harvard University
2011-12	Princeton University	Ohio University
2010-11	United States Naval Academy	Princeton University
2009-10	Eastern Michigan	Princeton University
2008-09	United States Naval Academy	Harvard University
2007-08	United States Naval Academy	Harvard University
2006-07	Princeton University	Harvard University
2005-06	Princeton University	Harvard University
2004-05	Missouri State	UC-Irvine
2003-04	Eastern Michigan	Miami University (OH)

Current Poll

== Key conferences ==
As a convenient shorthand, the term "high major" basketball conference is often synonymous with the college football Power Four conferences:

- Atlantic Coast Conference (ACC)
- Big 12 Conference
- Big Ten Conference
- Southeastern Conference (SEC)

These leagues, along with the Big East and the since-decimated Pac-12 Conference, were the six so-called AQ ("automatic qualifying") conferences during the Bowl Championship Series (BCS) era in college football. Following the breakup of the Big East and end of the BCS era, the remaining five were the primary members of the College Football Playoff (CFP) structure that began in the 2014 season. The CFP is centered around a group of bowl games often called the "New Year's Six", with two of them hosting CFP semifinals each season in rotation. During the CFP's four-team era (2014–2023), football champions of these conferences were assured of a spot in a "New Year's Six" game, though not necessarily in a CFP semifinal.

In 2024, which coincidentally saw the Pac-12 lose 10 of its previous 12 members to other power conferences, the CFP was expanded to 12 teams, with one berth guaranteed to the highest-rated team among the non-power conferences. The following year saw a five-loss Duke team win the ACC title, leading to a second Group of Six team, James Madison, making the CFP alongside the highest-ranked G6 champion, Tulane.

The two leagues that resulted from the 2013 split of the original Big East Conference—the football-sponsoring American Conference and non-football Big East Conference—are often considered to be major basketball conferences as well. When the original league split along football lines, the seven non-FBS schools, plus Creighton, Butler, and Xavier, founded the current Big East while the three remaining FBS schools, Cincinnati, UConn, and Temple, became The American. In every year since the split, the "new" Big East has been ranked a top five basketball conference by leading analysts such as Ken Pomeroy. Villanova won the men's basketball national championship in the 2015-2016 and 2017–18 seasons. The American has also found success, consistently ranking a top ten league. In the 2013–14 season, the first after the split, American member UConn won national titles in both men's and women's basketball. The American also included several other historically major men's programs such as Cincinnati, Houston, Memphis, and Temple. UConn eventually left the American in 2020 to reunite with many of its historic rivals in the current Big East, and has since won men's national championships in 2023 and 2024 and reached the men's championship game in 2026. Cincinnati and Houston also eventually left the American for the Big 12 Conference in 2023, and Houston reached the men's championship game in 2025.

The term "mid-major" is sometimes used to describe all of the other 25 basketball-playing conferences not receiving automatic tie-ins to either the BCS or CFP. However, most of the time the term is specifically applied only to the non-CFP conferences that consistently produce quality NCAA Tournament teams (distinguishing them from the "low-major" conferences). Often the definition of a "mid-major" is a conference that garners only one bid to the NCAA tournament (its automatic bid, won by its conference tournament winner) and no at large bids, all the while not garnering the attention and television dollars of a major conference.

Until the 2010s, the Atlantic 10, Conference USA, the Mountain West Conference, and the Western Athletic Conference were widely considered to be high-major conferences but a step below the level of the six BCS conferences. However, due to recent changes in membership in some conferences, as well as the sustained success of some "mid-major" conferences, most no longer consider the Atlantic 10 and Mountain West to be below the level of the CFP conferences in college basketball. One reason why is the 2012–2013 RPI (a rating then used by the tournament selection committee), which in 2012–13 ranked the Mountain West as the third best conference in Division I (ahead of the ACC, Big 12, Pac-12, and SEC) and the Atlantic 10 seventh (ahead of the SEC). The strength of these two non-CFP conferences in men's college basketball in 2012–13 was not an aberration, given that in 2011–12 the Mountain West finished the year ranked fifth, and the Atlantic 10 ranked seventh, both ahead of the Pac-12. Given the rankings of these two leagues, as well as their prestige, performance, recent post-season results, national perception, exposure, attendance, and many other factors, most observers have trouble considering certain non-CFP conferences as "mid-majors".

So-called "mid-major" basketball programs generally belong to one of the following twenty-four conferences. Note that some of these conferences, including the Mountain West and the Atlantic 10, may be considered a "high-major" as opposed to a mid-major depending on whom one asks.

- America East Conference (sometimes AmEast)
- American Conference
- Atlantic Sun Conference (ASUN)
- Atlantic 10 Conference (A-10)
- Big Sky Conference
- Big South Conference
- Big West Conference
- Coastal Athletic Association (CAA)
- Conference USA (CUSA)
- Horizon League
- Ivy League
- Metro Conference – formerly Metro Atlantic Athletic Conference
- Mid-Eastern Athletic Conference (MEAC)
- Mid-American Conference (MAC)
- Missouri Valley Conference (MVC)
- Mountain West Conference (MW)
- NEC (formerly Northeast Conference)
- Ohio Valley Conference (OVC)
- Pac-12 Conference, after its 2026 resumption of full operation
- Patriot League
- Southern Conference (SoCon)
- Southland Conference (SLC)
- Southwestern Athletic Conference (SWAC)
- Summit League
- Sun Belt Conference (SBC)
- United Athletic Conference (UAC or The United) – formerly Western Athletic Conference
- West Coast Conference (WCC)

Conference USA, the United (during its time as the WAC), and the American Conference all once had many strong basketball programs, but since 1999 WAC/United men's basketball has dropped in prestige due to the departure of many members. CUSA has lost members mainly to the pre-2013 Big East, the American, and the Sun Belt Conference. In turn, the American has lost five significant basketball brands since the 2013 Big East split—Louisville to the ACC and Rutgers to the Big Ten in 2014, UConn to the current Big East in 2020, and Cincinnati and Houston to the Big 12 in 2023.

This list is not static from year to year, as many fail to agree which conferences are truly the majors and which are the mid-majors and/or low-majors during any given season. (The Big West and Ohio Valley Conference were previously included on this list; they finished the 2011–2012 season as the 21st and 25th, respectively, ranked conferences in the RPI.) Some still refuse to consider the Mountain West to be a "major" conference, despite outperforming several other "major" (BCS) conferences for the last several years in a row. There are many conferences (besides the six BCS conferences) that have regularly had teams advance to the Sweet Sixteen or beyond, regularly challenge for multiple NCAA Tournament bids, have multiple teams "buy" games from lower-ranked conferences, and have finished in the top 10 in conference attendance every year for the last decade. Additionally, as noted previously, Gonzaga is now seen as a major program despite its mid-major conference affiliation.

The basketball website Collegeinsider.com created its own definition of "mid-major" when it introduced a pair of end-of-season awards for outstanding mid-major individuals in college basketball: the Lou Henson Award for players (first presented in 2010) and Hugh Durham Award for coaches (first presented in 2005). Since the 2013–14 season, players and coaches from the following conferences have been ineligible for these awards:

- All conferences that sponsor FBS football, except for the MAC and Sun Belt
- Atlantic 10
- Big East

Additionally, although Collegeinsider.com continues to include Gonzaga in its unofficial "Mid-Major Top 25" when warranted, it apparently no longer considers Gonzaga to be eligible for its "mid-major" awards. For example, in 2020–21, Gonzaga had no representatives on the Lou Henson All-America Team, consisting of the 25 players on the final watchlist for the Henson Award. This was despite three Gonzaga players (Corey Kispert, Jalen Suggs, Drew Timme) being consensus All-Americans in that season.

Members of these conferences were also generally ineligible for CollegeInsider.com Postseason Tournament, and remained so for that event's effective successor, The Basketball Classic.

In Division I women's basketball, the analytics website Her Hoop Stats created a similar definition of "mid-major" when it introduced the Becky Hammon Mid-Major Player of the Year Award in 2020. Currently, players from the Power Four conferences, plus the Big East, are ineligible for this award.

== Issues mid-major programs face ==
Mid-major teams often have a difficult time scheduling major conference opponents, especially at home. Major conference teams usually will not schedule a high quality mid-major team, knowing that there is an uncomfortably high chance that they will lose (especially if the game is at the mid-major team's home court) and if the major team does win, there is often little benefit in media exposure for beating a non-major school. Some major conference teams also believe that scheduling games with additional competitive teams isn't necessary for their current team's development, as they believe there will be enough "tough games" during conference play. This phenomenon often manifests itself in major squads playing mostly lower ranked mid-major conference teams (while refusing schedule requests from better mid-major squads) in their out-of-conference schedules, thereby establishing very impressive records against lesser foes and bypassing higher quality mid-major teams in the process.

A recent example of a men's basketball program that faced extreme challenges in assembling a schedule is Miami University in 2025–26. Associate head coach Jonathan Holmes, who was tasked by head coach Travis Steele with preparing the 2025–26 schedule, found it all but impossible to schedule any power-conference team, or even any good team in a high-mid-major conference. Holmes purposely left schedule slots open into September, long after most Division I teams had set their schedules, hoping that a quality team would have a game fall through. According to Yahoo Sports' Jeff Eisenberg, "Only in early October did the Redhawks finally give up and unveil a non-league schedule featuring three NAIA opponents and an array of matchups against the dregs of Division I." In a story released the day before the RedHawks were aiming to enter their conference tournament unbeaten, (Note: Miami would win its final regular-season game.) Holmes told Eisenberg "I was told no by probably 75 to 90 teams, from obviously all your power conferences, to your A-10s, to your Mountain Wests. I guess you could say we were in scheduling no man’s land. We didn’t fit the profile of what anyone was looking for." Eisenberg also added, "No one wanted to play a sneaky-good mid-major that won 25 games the previous season and retained six of its top nine players."

Eisenberg explained this dynamic more fully in the same story:

Since losses against Quad 3 and Quad 4 (Note: Quadrants 3 and 4, the lowest of the four categories that the NCAA tournament selection committee uses in evaluating prospective tournament teams.) teams are considered damaging to a prospective NCAA tournament team’s résumé, high-major programs have sought to play their guarantee games against the lowest-ranked Division I teams they can find. Those low-risk matchups allow power-conference teams to pad their win totals. Massive margins of victory also help those high-majors improve their standing in the NET, (Note: NCAA Evaluation Tool.) KenPom (Note: A predictive metric developed by Ken Pomeroy.) and other predictive metrics used by the selection committee. Left with scant options are mid-majors who don’t fit neatly into either one of those buckets, teams like Miami, High Point, Belmont or Liberty. Power-conference teams perceive those types of dangerous matchups as having plenty of downside and little reward.

In recent years, the NCAA Tournament Selection Committee has stressed the importance of a team's strength of schedule (SOS) in the nonconference portion of their schedule. Teams with a low-ranked nonconference SOS have often been penalized in their seeding and in some cases not selected for the tournament at all. In 2006, Florida State was left out of the tournament field in large part because its out-of-conference schedule was rated #316 out of 333 Division I teams.

The difficulty most mid-majors have in scheduling major conference opponents has a large effect on their ability to qualify for the NCAA basketball championship tournament and for the National Invitation Tournament. Often, mid-major teams with outstanding records are passed over for at-large berths in the NCAA Tournament in favor of teams from BCS conferences with mediocre records, based partly on the fact that the mid-major teams often have a lower strength of schedule. Without the ability to play more "major" opponents, most mid-majors have to stake their Tournament hopes on winning their conference's season-ending tournament (which promises an automatic berth in the NCAA Tournament) since the possibility of an at-large bid is often remote. Mid-majors that do make it into the tournament by winning their conference tournament are regularly placed in the lowest seeds (four of the eight play-in game seeds are reserved for mid-major conference champions), which effectively ensures they will be eliminated from the tournament quickly because they will have to face the strongest teams in the tournament in their first game. (Only one play-in game participant has ever defeated a 1 seed, when Fairleigh Dickinson defeated Purdue in 2023; it was not until 2018 that any 16 seed had ever defeated a 1 seed.) To expand opportunities for mid-majors to play postseason basketball, some unofficial postseason tournaments have arisen, including the aforementioned CollegeInsider.com tournament and the College Basketball Invitational; however, as most of the schools are smaller, they may not be able to afford the entry fees for these pay-to-play tournaments, and a number of mid-major schools have policies prohibiting play in them.

The Gonzaga Bulldogs face a slightly different set of challenges. Since its Elite Eight appearance in 1999, it has successfully established itself as the closest thing to a major program in a mid-major conference, making the tournament field in every year since, even in years it failed to win the West Coast Conference tournament. Its position in a mid-major conference is no longer a primary issue with regard to making the tournament field, but is often perceived to adversely affect its tournament seeding. The Bulldogs typically play a nationally competitive nonconference schedule, frequently going on the road, and have proven themselves capable of defeating nationally prominent opponents. However, the relative weakness of the West Coast Conference (WCC) hurts Gonzaga's strength of schedule, which in turn lowers the Bulldogs' Ratings Percentage Index (RPI) (an important numerical criterion in tournament selection). Gonzaga's challenges were similar to those faced by Nevada-Las Vegas under Jerry Tarkanian, whose Running Rebels dominated a relatively weak Big West Conference (formerly the Pacific Coast Athletic Association) from 1974 to 1992.

Some mid-major teams are now preferring to play "home" games in larger nearby arenas. Gonzaga uses the Spokane Arena in its home city or Climate Pledge Arena in Seattle for these larger-audience games. Some mid-major and major conference teams have made the use of non-campus arenas permanent. Saint Bonaventure University, one of the smallest colleges in Division I, has regularly played games at Blue Cross Arena in Rochester and KeyBank Center in Buffalo.

The NCAA tournament selection for the 2006 men's tournament was surrounded by controversy related to mid-major programs. A number of teams from mid-major conferences had unprecedented success in the non-conference portions of their schedule, and were therefore ranked highly in the RPI throughout the season. A change in the NCAA's RPI rating process prior to the 2005 season also improved many of these teams' chances by changing from a formula that treated home and road wins and losses equally, to a formula that gave higher weight to road games. Because many BCS conference teams played no more than one or two non-conference games away from home, there was a de facto bolstering of RPI ratings for many mid-major teams, leading to speculation about how this "new" version of the RPI would be used in the selection process by the NCAA tournament selection committee. In spite of a new precedent being set by the committee by leaving the highest ranked RPI team ever, #21 Missouri State of the Missouri Valley Conference, out of the tournament field, some mid-majors with strong RPI's received at-large bids over lower-ranked BCS conference teams. This prompted harsh criticism from sports writers and coaches of BCS conference teams that did not receive bids. This criticism flew in the face of the fact that the six BCS conferences still received more bids (32) from the committee than in most past years. The mid-major conference teams that were selected went on to silence those critics when a record number (five) advanced to the "Sweet 16". Even more significantly, one of those teams, George Mason, then of the Colonial Athletic Association (now known as the Coastal Athletic Association), made it to the Final Four. In both the 2008 and 2009 NCAA tournaments, mid-major Siena had a strong showing, advancing to the second round with wins over Vanderbilt and Ohio State respectively. In the 2010 NCAA Division I men's basketball tournament, the Butler University Bulldogs reached the Final Four, becoming the 3rd mid-major to make the Final Four in the modern (1985–present) era. On April 3, they beat Michigan State of the Big Ten Conference to become the second mid-major to reach the national championship game since 1998.

The 2011 NCAA Division I men's basketball tournament was the first time since the tournament expanded to 64 teams in 1985 that two mid-majors met in the Final Four. The Butler University Bulldogs returned for their second consecutive appearance after winning the Southeast Regional in New Orleans as a #8 seed. The Virginia Commonwealth University Rams of the Colonial Athletic Association advanced to their first Final Four appearance after winning the Southwest Regional in San Antonio as a #11 seed. VCU became the first team in history to win five games to reach the Final Four, winning the First Four round in its inaugural year. VCU tied LSU in 1986 and fellow CAA team, George Mason, in 2006 as the highest seed to reach the Final Four (#11). The previous time two mid-majors advanced to the same Final Four was the 1979 NCAA Division I men's basketball tournament, when Indiana State of the Missouri Valley and Penn of the Ivy League qualified. Butler is no longer a mid-major due to its membership in the Big East since 2013. VCU has since joined the Atlantic 10, where it has consistently been among the top teams, even following the departure of coach Shaka Smart for Texas in 2015, and his successor, Will Wade, for LSU in 2017. George Mason is now also an Atlantic 10 member.

Mid-major basketball teams also face significant disadvantages when it comes to resources to spend on recruiting, marketing, and operations, including coaches' salaries. Mid-major basketball blogger Kyle Whellison, who describes as mid-major any team from a conference where average total spending on men's basketball programs is less than $2 million and average total spending on all athletic programs is less than $20 million, notes that teams from major conferences win games against teams from mid-major conferences roughly 84 percent of the time.

In unusual cases, teams may have reputations as mid-majors even if they participate in major conference. An example of this is Saint Bonaventure, one of the smallest universities in Division I; the Bonnies have been a member of the Atlantic 10 Conference (in which it has been a consistent contender under current coach Mark Schmidt). In 2016, the Bonnies were denied a bid into the NCAA Tournament because of their non-conference schedule; Saint Bonaventure has regularly scheduled rivalry games with the three other Western New York universities in Division I (Buffalo, Canisius and Niagara), all of which are considered mid-majors. Their participation in a major conference, in turn, disqualifies the team from awards and tournament bids (such as the College Insider tournament mentioned above) reserved for mid-majors.
