= Patriot League men's basketball tournament =

American college basketball conference championship

- Number of teams: 10
- Format: Single-elimination tournament
- Current stadium: on-campus sites
- Current location: on-campus sites
- Played: 1991–present
- Last contest: 2026
- Current champion: Lehigh University (4th title)
- Most championships: Colgate (7)
- TV partner: CBS Sports Network
- Official website: PatriotLeague.CSTV.com Men's Basketball

The Patriot League men's basketball tournament is held at the conclusion of each regular season. The winner of the tournament is awarded an automatic bid to the NCAA Men's Division I Basketball Championship.

== Tournament finals results ==
Year	Champion	Score	Runner-up	Tournament MVP	Location
1991	Fordham	84–81^{OT}	Holy Cross	Damon Lopez, FU	Hart Center (Worcester, MA)
1992	Fordham	70–56	Bucknell	Fred Herzog, FU	Stabler Arena (Bethlehem, PA)
1993	Holy Cross	98–73	Bucknell	Rob Feaster, HC	Davis Gym (Lewisburg, PA)
1994	Navy	78–76	Colgate	TJ Hall, Navy	Alumni Hall (Annapolis, MD)
1995	Colgate	68–63	Navy	Tucker Neale, CU	Cotterell Court (Hamilton, NY)
1996	Colgate	74–65	Holy Cross	Adonal Foyle, CU	Cotterell Court (Hamilton, NY)
1997	Navy	76–75	Bucknell	Hassan Booker, Navy	Alumni Hall (Annapolis, MD)
1998	Navy	93–85	Lafayette	Skip Victor, Navy	Alumni Hall (Annapolis, MD)
1999	Lafayette	67–63	Bucknell	Brian Ehlers, LC	Kirby Sports Center (Easton, PA)
2000	Lafayette	87–61	Navy	Stefan Ciosici, LC	Kirby Sports Center (Easton, PA)
2001	Holy Cross	68–64^{OT}	Navy	Josh Sankes, HC	Hart Center (Worcester, MA)
2002	Holy Cross	58–54	American	Tim Szatko, HC	Bender Arena (Washington, D.C.)
2003	Holy Cross	72–64	American	Patrick Whearty, HC	Hart Center (Worcester, MA)
2004	Lehigh	59–57	American	Austen Rowland, LU	Stabler Arena (Bethlehem, PA)
2005	Bucknell	61–57	Holy Cross	Charles Lee, BU	Hart Center (Worcester, MA)
2006	Bucknell	74–59	Holy Cross	Charles Lee, BU	Sojka Pavilion (Lewisburg, PA)
2007	Holy Cross	74–66	Bucknell	Keith Simmons, HC	Hart Center (Worcester, MA)
2008	American	52–46	Colgate	Garrison Carr, AU	Bender Arena (Washington, D.C.)
2009	American	73–57	Holy Cross	Garrison Carr, AU	Bender Arena (Washington, D.C.)
2010	Lehigh	74–59	Lafayette	Zahir Carrington, LU	Stabler Arena (Bethlehem, PA)
2011	Bucknell	72–57	Lafayette	Mike Muscala, BU	Sojka Pavilion (Lewisburg, PA)
2012	Lehigh	82–77	Bucknell	CJ McCollum, LU	Sojka Pavilion (Lewisburg, PA)
2013	Bucknell	64–56	Lafayette	Mike Muscala, BU	Sojka Pavilion (Lewisburg, PA)
2014	American	55–36	Boston University	Darius Gardner, AU	Agganis Arena (Boston, MA)
2015	Lafayette	65–63	American	Nick Lindner, LC	Kirby Sports Center (Easton, PA)
2016	Holy Cross	59–56	Lehigh	Malachi Alexander, HC	Stabler Arena (Bethlehem, PA)
2017	Bucknell	81–65	Lehigh	Zach Thomas, BU	Sojka Pavilion (Lewisburg, PA)
2018	Bucknell	83–54	Colgate	Stephen Brown, BU	Sojka Pavilion (Lewisburg, PA)
2019	Colgate	94–80	Bucknell	Jordan Burns, CU	Cotterell Court (Hamilton, NY)
2020	Boston University	64–61	Colgate	Max Mahoney, BU	Cotterell Court (Hamilton, NY)
2021	Colgate	85–72	Loyola Maryland	Jordan Burns, CU	Cotterell Court (Hamilton, NY)
2022	Colgate	74–58	Navy	Jack Ferguson, CU	Cotterell Court (Hamilton, NY)
2023	Colgate	79–61	Lafayette	Tucker Richardson, CU	Cotterell Court (Hamilton, NY)
2024	Colgate	74–55	Lehigh	Braeden Smith, CU	Cotterell Court (Hamilton, NY)
2025	American	74–52	Navy	Matt Rogers, AU	Bender Arena (Washington, D.C.)
2026	Lehigh	74–60	Boston University	Nasir Whitlock, LU	Stabler Arena (Bethlehem, PA)

== Championships by school ==
Tournament			Regular season	
Team	Championships	Years	Championships	Years
Colgate	7	1995, 1996, 2019, 2021, 2022, 2023, 2024	8	1994^, 1995^, 1996^, 2019^, 2020, 2022, 2023, 2024
Bucknell	6	2005, 2006, 2011, 2013, 2017, 2018	14	1992^, 1993, 1995^, 2006, 2007^, 2011, 2012, 2013, 2015, 2016, 2017, 2018, 2019^, 2025^
Holy Cross	6	1993, 2001, 2002, 2003, 2007, 2016	5	1994^, 2001, 2003, 2005, 2007^
American	4	2008, 2009, 2014, 2025	5	2002, 2004^, 2008, 2009, 2025^
Lehigh	4	2004, 2010, 2012, 2026	2	2004^, 2010
Navy	3	1994, 1997, 1998	6*	1994^, 1996^, 1997, 1998^, 2000^, 2026
Lafayette	3	1999, 2000, 2015	3	1998^, 1999, 2000^
Fordham†	2	1991, 1992	3	1991, 1992^, 1994^
Boston University	1	2020	1	2014
Army	0		0	
Loyola (MD)	0		0	
Total	36		43 (23)	

^ Regular season co-champion
*In 2021, Navy finished 12–1, the best regular season winning percentage and received the #1 seed in the league tournament. However, the Patriot League did not award Navy a regular season title due to the unbalanced schedule. Navy played only 5 of the other 9 teams in the league and played more than half of their league games against just two teams.
† Fordham departed the Patriot League in all sports (except football) in 1995.

== Postseason results ==
NCAA tournament results
Year	PL Team	Opponent	Result
1991	No appearance, Fordham lost a play-in against St. Francis		
1992	(14) Fordham	(3) Massachusetts	L 58–85
1993	(13) Holy Cross	(4) Arkansas	L 64–94
1994	(16) Navy	(1) Missouri	L 53–76
1995	(16) Colgate	(1) Kansas	L 68–72
1996	(16) Colgate	(1) Connecticut	L 59–68
1997	(15) Navy	(2) Utah	L 61–75
1998	(16) Navy	(1) North Carolina	L 52–88
1999	(15) Lafayette	(2) Miami (FL)	L 54–75
2000	(15) Lafayette	(2) Temple	L 42–73
2001	(15) Holy Cross	(2) Kentucky	L 68–72
2002	(16) Holy Cross	(1) Kansas	L 59–70
2003	(14) Holy Cross	(3) Marquette	L 68–72
2004	(16) Lehigh	(16) Florida A&M	L 57–72
2005	(14) Bucknell	(3) Kansas (6) Wisconsin	W 64–63; L 62–71
2006	(9) Bucknell	(8) Arkansas (1) Memphis	W 59–55; L 56–72
2007	(13) Holy Cross	(4) Southern Illinois	L 51–61
2008	(15) American	(2) Tennessee	L 57–72
2009	(14) American	(3) Villanova	L 67–80
2010	(16) Lehigh	(1) Kansas	L 74–90
2011	(14) Bucknell	(3) Connecticut	L 52–81
2012	(15) Lehigh	(2) Duke (10) Xavier	W 75–70; L 58–70
2013	(11) Bucknell	(6) Butler	L 56–68
2014	(15) American	(2) Wisconsin	L 35–75
2015	(16) Lafayette	(1) Villanova	L 52–93
2016	(16) Holy Cross	(16) Southern (1) Oregon	W 59–55; L 52–91
2017	(13) Bucknell	(4) West Virginia	L 80–86
2018	(14) Bucknell	(3) Michigan St	L 78–82
2019	(15) Colgate	(2) Tennessee	L 70–77
2020	NCAA Tournament was cancelled due to the Covid-19 pandemic.		
2021	(14) Colgate	(3) Arkansas	L 68–85
2022	(14) Colgate	(3) Wisconsin	L 60–67
2023	(15) Colgate	(2) Texas	L 61–81
2024	(14) Colgate	(3) Baylor	L 67–92
2025	(16) American	(16) Mount St. Mary's	L 72–83
2026	(16) Lehigh	(16) Prairie View A&M	L 55–67

NIT results
Year	PL Team	Opponent	Result
2005	Holy Cross	Notre Dame; Saint Joseph's	W 78–73; L 60–68
2012	(8) Bucknell	(1) Arizona (5) Nevada	W 65–54; L 67–75
2014	(7) Boston	(2) Illinois	L 62–66
2015	(8) Bucknell	(1) Temple	L 67–73
2016	(8) Bucknell	(1) Monmouth	L 80–90
2026	Navy	(1) Wake Forest	L 72–82

== All-time Patriot League Tournament records ==
Records as of March 8, 2023

Team	Seasons	Games	Wins	Losses	Win %	Finals app.	Semis app.
Bucknell	33	72	45	27	.625	13	24
American	22	46	28	18	.609	7	15
Colgate	33	61	34	27	.557	10	18
Holy Cross	33	62	34	28	.548	11	16
Boston University	10	19	10	9	.526	2	5
Lafayette	33	55	25	30	.455	8	14
Lehigh	33	55	25	30	.455	5	16
Navy	32	48	19	29	.396	7	9
Loyola University Maryland	10	16	6	10	.375	1	1
Army	33	44	11	33	.250	0	10

*Fordham left the Patriot League in men's basketball after the 1994–95 season, with a cumulative tournament record of 7–3 in its 5 seasons with the league. In total Fordham made 2 finals appearances and 4 semi-finals appearances.

== All-time regular season standings ==
Records as of February 25, 2023

Team	Games	Wins	Losses	Win %	Titles (solo)	Last	Winning seasons
Bucknell	480	315	165	.656	13 (9)	2019	24 (of 33)
Boston University	178	101	77	.567	1 (1)	2014	6 (of 10)
Colgate	482	263	219	.546	7 (3)	2023	15 (of 33)
American	339	182	157	.537	4 (3)	2009	10 (of 22)
Holy Cross	486	256	230	.527	5 (3)	2007	15 (of 33)
Navy	471	231	240	.490	5 (1)	2000**	15 (of 32)
Lehigh*	484	232	252	.479	2 (1)	2010	15 (of 33)
Lafayette	484	206	278	.426	3 (1)	2000	9 (of 33)
Loyola University Maryland	176	68	108	.386	0 (0)	n/a	0 (of 10)
Army	484	160	324	.331	0 (0)	n/a	4 (of 33)

*Adjusted for vacated wins of 2004–05 season. Lehigh finished with a league record of 7–7, but later vacated 6 wins for an adjusted record of 1–13 (per Forfeits and Vacated Games)

**In 2021, Navy finished 12–1, the best regular season winning percentage and received the #1 seed in the league tournament. However, the Patriot League did not award Navy a regular season title due to the unbalanced schedule. Navy played only 5 of the other 9 teams in the league and played more than half of their league games against just two teams.

***Fordham left the Patriot League in men's basketball after the 1994–95 season, with a cumulative record of 46–22 (0.676), 3 regular season titles (1 solo) and winning seasons in 4 of 5 played.

== Regular season honors ==
Year	MVP	Team	CoY	Team	RoY	Team	DPoY	Team
1991	Damon Lopez	Fordham	Nick Macarchuk	Fordham	Jim Nairus	Holy Cross	Not awarded	Not awarded
1992	Patrick King	Bucknell	Jack Bruen	Colgate	Rob Feaster	Holy Cross	Not awarded	Not awarded
1993	Mike Bright	Bucknell	Charlie Woollum	Bucknell	Alex Morris	Army	Not awarded	Not awarded
1994	Tucker Neale	Colgate	Don DeVoe	Navy	Gordon Mboya	Bucknell	Not awarded	Not awarded
1995	Rob Feaster	Holy Cross	Pat Flannery	Bucknell	Adonal Foyle	Colgate	Not awarded	Not awarded
1996	Adonal Foyle	Colgate	Jack Bruen	Colgate	Stefan Ciosici	Lafayette	Not awarded	Not awarded
1997	Adonal Foyle	Colgate	Pat Flannery & Don DeVoe	Bucknell & Navy	Dan Bowen	Bucknell	Not awarded	Not awarded
1998	Stefan Ciosici	Lafayette	Fran O'Hanlon	Lafayette	Tyson Whitfield	Lafayette	Not awarded	Not awarded
1999	Brian Ehlers	Lafayette	Fran O'Hanlon	Lafayette	Pat Campolieta	Colgate	Not awarded	Not awarded
2000	Brian Ehlers	Lafayette	Don DeVoe	Navy	Tim Szatko	Holy Cross	Not awarded	Not awarded
2001	Tim Szatko	Holy Cross	Ralph Willard	Holy Cross	Mark Linebaugh	Colgate	Not awarded	Not awarded
2002	Patrick Doctor	American	Pat Harris	Army	Nate Lufkin	Holy Cross	Not awarded	Not awarded
2003	Patrick Whearty	Holy Cross	Billy Taylor	Lehigh	Kevin Bettencourt	Bucknell	Not awarded	Not awarded
2004	Austen Rowland	Lehigh	Billy Taylor	Lehigh	Andre Ingram	American	Not awarded	Not awarded
2005	Kevin Hamilton	Holy Cross	Ralph Willard	Holy Cross	Pat Doherty	Holy Cross	Abe Badmus	Bucknell
2006	Charles Lee	Bucknell	Pat Flannery	Bucknell	Derrick Mercer	American	Kevin Hamilton	Holy Cross
2007	Keith Simmons	Holy Cross	Ralph Willard	Holy Cross	Marquis Hall	Lehigh	Torey Thomas	Holy Cross
2008	Greg Sprink	Navy	Billy Lange	Navy	Rob Keefer	Lehigh	Stephen Tyree	Bucknell
2009	Derrick Mercer	American	Jeff Jones	American	RJ Evans	Holy Cross	Marcus Nelson	Army
2010	CJ McCollum	Lehigh	Fran O'Hanlon	Lafayette	CJ McCollum	Lehigh	Bryan Cohen	Bucknell
2011	Mike Muscala	Bucknell	Dave Paulsen	Bucknell	JJ Avila	Navy	Bryan Cohen	Bucknell
2012	CJ McCollum	Lehigh	Dave Paulsen	Bucknell	Justin Burrell	Holy Cross	Bryan Cohen	Bucknell
2013	Mike Muscala	Bucknell	Zach Spiker	Army	Kyle Wilson	Army	Mike Muscala	Bucknell
2014	Cameron Ayers	Bucknell	Mike Brennan	American	Tim Kempton Jr.	Lehigh	Tony Wroblicky	American
2015	Tim Kempton Jr.	Lehigh	Dave Paulsen	Bucknell	Kahron Ross	Lehigh	Luke Roh	Colgate
2016	Tim Kempton Jr.	Lehigh	Nathan Davis	Bucknell	Delante Jones	American	Will Kelly	Army
2017	Nana Foulland	Bucknell	Nathan Davis	Bucknell	Will Rayman	Colgate	Nana Foulland	Bucknell
2018	Zach Thomas	Bucknell	Matt Langel	Colgate	Alex Petrie	Lafayette	Jehyve Floyd	Holy Cross
2019	Rapolas Ivanauskas	Colgate	Matt Langel	Colgate	Tucker Richardson	Colgate	Jehyve Floyd	Holy Cross
2020	Sa'eed Nelson	American	Matt Langel	Colgate	Joe Pridgen	Holy Cross	Will Rayman	Colgate
2021	Jordan Burns	Colgate	Ed DeChellis	Navy	Johnny O'Neil	American	Josh Caldwell	Army
2022	Sukhmail Mathon	Boston University	Ed DeChellis	Navy	Kyrell Luc	Holy Cross	Josh Caldwell	Army
2023	Tucker Richardson	Colgate	Matt Langel	Colgate	Ethan Roberts	Army	Tucker Richardson	Colgate
2024	Braeden Smith	Colgate	Matt Langel	Colgate	Josh Scovens	Army	Caleb Kenney	Holy Cross

=== Award winners by school ===
†	Denotes school is no longer a member of the Patriot League

School	Player of the Year wins	Years
Bucknell	8	1992, 1993, 2006, 2011, 2013, 2014, 2017, 2018
Colgate	7	1994, 1996, 1997, 2019, 2021, 2023, 2024
Holy Cross	5	1995, 2001, 2003, 2005, 2007
Lehigh	5	2004, 2010, 2012, 2015, 2016
American	3	2002, 2009, 2020
Lafayette	3	1998, 1999, 2000
Boston University	1	2022
Fordham†	1	1991
Navy	1	2008

School	Coach of the Year wins	Years
Bucknell	9	1993, 1995, 1997*, 2006, 2011, 2012, 2015, 2016, 2017
Colgate	7	1992, 1996, 2018, 2019, 2020, 2023, 2024
Navy	6	1994, 1997*, 2000, 2008, 2021, 2022
Holy Cross	3	2001, 2005, 2007
Lafayette	3	1998, 1999, 2010
American	2	2009, 2014
Army	2	2002, 2013
Lehigh	2	2003, 2004
Fordham†	1	1991

*The 1997 Patriot League Coach of the Year award was shared between Pat Flannery of Bucknell and Don DeVoe of Navy.

School	Rookie of the Year wins	Years
Holy Cross	9	1991, 1992, 2000, 2002, 2005, 2009, 2012, 2020, 2022
Colgate	5	1995, 1999, 2001, 2017, 2019
Lehigh	5	2007, 2008, 2010, 2014, 2015
American	4	2004, 2006, 2016, 2021
Army	4	1993, 2013, 2023, 2024
Bucknell	3	1994, 1997, 2003
Lafayette	3	1996, 1998, 2018
Navy	1	2011

School	Defensive Player of the Year wins	Years
Bucknell	7	2005, 2008, 2010, 2011, 2012, 2013, 2017
Holy Cross	5	2006, 2007, 2018, 2019, 2024
Army	4	2009, 2016, 2021, 2022
Colgate	3	2015, 2020, 2023
American	1	2014

== Broadcasters ==
=== Television ===
Year	Network	Play-by-play	Analyst	Sideline
2024	CBSSN	Jason Knapp	Mo Cassara	Keiana Martin
2023	CBSSN	Jason Knapp	Mo Cassara	Jamie Erdahl
2022	CBSSN	Jason Knapp	Mo Cassara	Jenny Dell
2021	CBSSN	Jason Knapp	Mo Cassara	
2020	CBSSN	Jason Knapp	Mo Cassara	Sherree Burruss
2019	CBSSN	Jason Knapp	Mo Cassara	Jenny Dell
2018	CBSSN	Jason Knapp	Pete Gillen	Cassie McKinney
2017	CBSSN	Jason Knapp	Mo Cassara	
2016	CBSSN	Jason Knapp	Mo Cassara	
2015	CBSSN	Jason Knapp	Chris Spatola	
2014	CBSSN	Jason Knapp	Chris Spatola	
2013	CBSSN	Bob Socci	Chris Spatola	
2012	CBSSN	Bob Socci	Vince Curran	
2011	ESPN2	Jon Sciambi	LaPhonso Ellis	
2010	ESPN	Jon Sciambi	LaPhonso Ellis	
2009	ESPN	Dave Barnett	Tim Welsh	
2008	ESPN	Dave O'Brien	Bob Valvano	
2007	ESPN2	Bob Wischusen	Tim McCormick	
2006	ESPN2	Bob Wischusen	Donny Marshall	
2005	ESPN2	Dave Revsine	Jay Williams	
2004	ESPN2	Dave Revsine	Doug Gottlieb	
2003	ESPN	Dave Revsine	Doris Burke	
2001	ESPN	Dewayne Staats	Bob Wenzel	

=== Radio ===
Year	Network	Play-by-play	Analyst
2024	Westwood One	Pat McCarthy	Kyle Macy
2023	Westwood One	John Sadak	Jon Crispin
2022	Westwood One	Tom McCarthy	Tim Welsh
2021	Westwood One	Brandon Gaudin	Kyle Macy
2020	Westwood One	John Sadak	Steve Lappas
2019	Westwood One	John Sadak	Debbie Antonelli
2018	Westwood One	John Sadak	Jon Crispin
2017	Westwood One	Ted Emrich	Jim Jackson
2016	Westwood One	Scott Graham	Kevin Grevey
2015	Westwood One	Scott Graham	Kevin Grevey
2014	Westwood One	Scott Graham	Kyle Macy
2013	Dial Global Sports	John Tautges	Kevin Grevey

== See also ==
- Patriot League women's basketball tournament
