= Bucknell Bison men's basketball statistical leaders =

The Bucknell Bison men's basketball statistical leaders are individual statistical leaders of the Bucknell Bison men's basketball program in various categories, including points, rebounds, assists, steals, and blocks. Within those areas, the lists identify single-game, single-season, and career leaders. The Bison represent Bucknell University in the NCAA's Patriot League.

Bucknell began competing in intercollegiate basketball in 1895. However, the school's record book does not generally list records from before the 1950s, as records from before this period are often incomplete and inconsistent. Since scoring was much lower in this era, and teams played much fewer games during a typical season, it is likely that few or no players from this era would appear on these lists anyway.

The NCAA did not officially record assists as a stat until the 1983–84 season, and blocks and steals until the 1985–86 season, but Bucknell's record books includes players in these stats before these seasons. These lists are updated through the end of the 2020–21 season.

== Scoring ==
Career
Rk	Player	Points	Seasons
1	Mike Muscala	2036	2009–10 2010–11 2011–12 2012–13
2	Al Leslie	1973	1977–78 1978–79 1979–80 1980–81
3	Bob Barry	1809	1976–77 1977–78 1978–79 1979–80
4	Nana Foulland	1754	2014–15 2015–16 2016–17 2017–18
5	Zach Thomas	1738	2014–15 2015–16 2016–17 2017–18
6	Mike Bright	1670	1989–90 1990–91 1991–92 1992–93
7	Kevin Bettencourt	1577	2002–03 2003–04 2004–05 2005–06
8	Jaye Andrews	1535	1981–82 1982–83 1983–84 1984–85
9	Chris McNaughton	1529	2003–04 2004–05 2005–06 2006–07
10	Cameron Ayers	1526	2010–11 2011–12 2012–13 2013–14

Season
Rk	Player	Points	Season
1	Zach Thomas	716	2017–18
2	Mike Muscala	637	2012–13
3	Bill Courtney	619	1990–91
4	Patrick King	610	1991–92
5	Mike Muscala	596	2011–12
6	Greg Leggett	585	1989–90
7	Kimbal Mackenzie	582	2018–19
8	Al Leslie	564	1979–80
	Andrew Funk	564	2021–22
10	Noah Williamson	562	2024–25

Single game
Rk	Player	Points	Season	Opponent
1	Al Leslie	45	1979–80	American
2	Jim Wherry	42	1967–68	Penn State
	Kevin Bettencourt	42	2003–04	St. Francis (Pa.)
4	Joe Steiner	41	1961–62	LaSalle
	Al Leslie	41	1980–81	West Chester
6	Joe Steiner	40	1960–61	Lehigh
	Chris Hass	40	2015–16	Army
8	Lorry Hathaway	39	1964–65	Delaware
	Patrick King	39	1991–92	Lafayette
	Brian Anderson	39	1993–94	Colgate

== Rebounds ==
Career
Rk	Player	Rebounds	Seasons
1	Hal Danzig	1134	1956–57 1957–58 1958–59
2	Mike Muscala	1093	2009–10 2010–11 2011–12 2012–13
3	Bob Barry	986	1976–77 1977–78 1978–79 1979–80
4	Craig Greenwood	909	1966–67 1967–68 1968–69
5	Nana Foulland	907	2014–15 2015–16 2016–17 2017–18
6	Lorry Hathaway	876	1962–63 1963–64 1964–65
7	Mike Butts	860	1985–86 1986–87 1987–88 1988–89
8	Joe Steiner	843	1959–60 1960–61 1961–62
9	Mike Bright	834	1989–90 1990–91 1991–92 1992–93
10	Zach Thomas	796	2014–15 2015–16 2016–17 2017–18

Season
Rk	Player	Rebounds	Season
1	Hal Danzig	387	1957–58
2	Hal Danzig	386	1958–59
3	Mike Muscala	378	2012–13
4	Hal Danzig	361	1956–57
5	Craig Greenwood	340	1968–69
6	Craig Greenwood	328	1967–68
7	Mike Muscala	319	2011–12
8	Zach Thomas	317	2017–18
9	Lorry Hathaway	316	1962–63
10	Joe Steiner	296	1960–61

Single game
Rk	Player	Rebounds	Season	Opponent
1	Hal Danzig	29	1957–58	Lehigh
2	Craig Greenwood	28	1967–68	DePauw

== Assists ==
Career
Rk	Player	Assists	Seasons
1	Mike Joseph	565	1986–87 1987–88 1988–89 1989–90
2	Chris Seneca	553	1984–85 1985–86 1986–87
3	Stephen Brown	524	2014–15 2015–16 2016–17 2017–18
4	Pat Flannery	505	1976–77 1977–78 1978–79 1979–80
5	Darryl Shazier	498	2007–08 2008–09 2009–10 2010–11
6	Steven Kaspar	413	2011–12 2012–13 2013–14 2014–15
7	Cal Puriefoy	399	1981–82 1982–83 1983–84
8	Jimmy Sotos	390	2017–18 2018–19 2019–20
9	Abe Badmus	375	2003–04 2004–05 2005–06 2006–07
10	Russell Peyton	332	1989–90 1990–91 1991–92 1992–93

Season
Rk	Player	Assists	Season
1	Chris Seneca	197	1986–87
2	Chris Seneca	191	1985–86
3	Jimmy Sotos	189	2018–19
4	Darryl Shazier	185	2010–11
5	Mike Joseph	182	1989–90
6	Mike Joseph	177	1987–88
	Mike Joseph	177	1988–89
8	Cal Puriefoy	167	1983–84
	Stephen Brown	167	2016–17
10	Chris Seneca	165	1984–85
	Stephen Brown	165	2015–16

Single game
Rk	Player	Assists	Season	Opponent
1	Russell Peyton	16	1991–92	UMBC

== Steals ==
Career
Rk	Player	Steals	Seasons
1	Mike Bright	286	1989–90 1990–91 1991–92 1992–93
2	Abe Badmus	217	2003–04 2004–05 2005–06 2006–07
3	Sekou Hamer	173	1992–93 1993–94 1994–95 1995–96
4	Russell Peyton	168	1989–90 1990–91 1991–92 1992–93
5	Charles Lee	167	2002–03 2003–04 2004–05 2005–06
6	Kevin Bettencourt	157	2002–03 2003–04 2004–05 2005–06
7	Stephen Brown	147	2014–15 2015–16 2016–17 2017–18
8	Jaye Andrews	144	1981–82 1982–83 1983–84 1984–85
9	J.R. Holden	142	1994–95 1995–96 1996–97 1997–98
10	Darryl Shazier	140	2007–08 2008–09 2009–10 2010–11

Season
Rk	Player	Steals	Season
1	Mike Bright	94	1992–93
2	Russell Peyton	88	1992–93
3	Mike Bright	71	1991–92
4	Charles Lee	70	2005–06
5	Mike Bright	69	1990–91
6	Sekou Hamer	65	1993–94
	Abe Badmus	65	2005–06
8	Al Leslie	60	1980–81
	J.R. Holden	60	1996–97
10	Achile Spadone	59	2025–26

Single game
Rk	Player	Steals	Season	Opponent
1	Jaye Andrews	8	1984–85	Drexel
	Russell Peyton	8	1992–93	Loyola (Md.)

== Blocks ==
Career
Rk	Player	Blocks	Seasons
1	Mike Butts	278	1985–86 1986–87 1987–88 1988–89
2	Mike Muscala	271	2009–10 2010–11 2011–12 2012–13
3	Nana Foulland	212	2014–15 2015–16 2016–17 2017–18
4	Dan Bowen	160	1996–97 1997–98 1998–99 1999–00
5	Mike Bright	120	1989–90 1990–91 1991–92 1992–93
6	Kihlon Golden	93	1992–93 1993–94 1994–95 1995–96
	Boakai Lalugba	93	1999–00 2000–01 2001–02 2002–03
8	Brian Anderson	86	1993–94 1994–95 1995–96
9	Andre Screen	82	2020–21 2021–22 2022–23
10	Chris McNaughton	80	2003–04 2004–05 2005–06 2006–07

Season
Rk	Player	Blocks	Season
1	Mike Butts	100	1988–89
2	Mike Butts	91	1987–88
3	Mike Muscala	80	2012–13
4	Nana Foulland	72	2016–17
5	Mike Muscala	67	2010–11
6	Mike Muscala	65	2009–10
7	Nana Foulland	61	2017–18
8	Mike Muscala	59	2011–12
9	Mike Butts	58	1985–86
10	Dan Bowen	48	1996–97

Single game
Rk	Player	Blocks	Season	Opponent
1	Mike Butts	8	1988–89	Lehigh
	Mike Butts	8	1988–89	Towson State
	Brian Anderson	8	1993–94	George Mason
	Mike Muscala	8	2010–11	Lehigh
