= Noah Williamson =

Latvian basketball player (born 2002)

Personal information
- Born: April 18, 2002 (age 24) Riga, Latvia
- Listed height: 7 ft 0 in (2.13 m)
- Listed weight: 255 lb (116 kg)

Career information
- High school: St. Thomas More (Oakdale, Connecticut)
- College: Bucknell (2022–2025); Alabama (2025–2026)
- NBA draft: 2026: undrafted
- Position: Center

Career highlights
- Patriot League Player of the Year (2025); First-team All-Patriot League (2025); Third-team All-Patriot League (2024); Patriot League All-Defensive team (2025)

Noah Williamson (born April 18, 2002), also known as Noa Daniels Viljamsons, is a Latvian basketball player. He played college basketball for the Bucknell Bison and Alabama Crimson Tide.

== High school career ==
Williamson played at St. Thomas More School. He committed to play college basketball at Bucknell.

== College career ==
Williamson played sparingly as a freshman at Bucknell. He had a breakout season as a sophomore, averaging 12.3 points and 6.4 rebounds per game while shooting 49.5 percent from the field. Williamson was named to the Third Team All-Patriot League as well as the All-Tournament Team. As a junior, Williamson averaged 17.6 points and 7.6 rebounds per game, helping the Bison finish 18–15. He was named Patriot League Player of the Year as well as First Team All-Patriot League as well as the Defensive Team.

Following the season, Williamson entered the transfer portal, ultimately landing with the Alabama Crimson Tide.
