= Greg Sprink =

American basketball player

- Sprink with the Navy Midshipmen in 2007

Personal information
- Born: June 29, 1985 (age 41) La Jolla, California, U.S.
- Listed height: 6 ft 5 in (1.96 m)
- Listed weight: 205 lb (93 kg)

Career information
- High school: El Camino (Oceanside, California)
- College: Navy (2004–2008)
- NBA draft: 2008: undrafted
- Position: Shooting guard

Career highlights
- AP Honorable mention All-American (2008); Patriot League Player of the Year (2008); First-team All-Patriot League (2008); Second-team All-Patriot League (2007); Patriot League All-Rookie Team (2005)

Greg Sprink (born June 29, 1985) is an American former basketball player known for his collegiate career at the United States Naval Academy (Navy) between 2004 and 2008, where he was the 2008 Patriot League Player of the Year as well as an honorable mention All-American. He never played professionally, serving required duty instead in the U.S. Navy. As of 2017 he works for a construction material wholesaler in the Houston, Texas area.

== High school ==
Sprink, a native of Cardiff-by-the-Sea, Encinitas, California, was an El Camino High School role player who garnered little attention from colleges. He primarily shot three-pointers and deferred to three teammates who were all committed to playing at NCAA Division I schools. As a senior, he led El Camino to the 2003 CIF San Diego championship with a 31–3 record. He also garnered honorable mention all-state honors as a junior and second-team all-state recognition as a senior.

Navy, however, sent Sprink multiple recruitment letters, which caught his attention. He appreciated the advantages of a Naval Academy education and secure job opportunities after his five-year military service commitment so he committed to play for the Midshipmen under new head coach Billy Lange. Spring spent a postgraduate year at the Naval Academy Preparatory School prior to enrolling at the university.

== College ==
Sprink entered his freshman year in 2004–05. He made an impact, averaging 10.1 points and 6.0 rebounds per game, good for third-best on Navy in both statistical categories. He, along with freshman teammate Corey Johnson, were named to the 2005 Patriot League All-Rookie Team. The following season in 2005–06, Sprinks led the Midshipmen in points (14.9 ppg), rebounding (4.9 rpg), three-pointers made (61), free throws made (95), and free throw percentage (85.6%). Navy only mustered a 10–18 overall record however.

As a junior, the Midshipmen showed improvement by putting together a 14–16 record. Sprink scored his 1,000th career point on February 2, 2007 against Bucknell and finished the season averaging 16.9 points per game, which led Navy. He also was second in rebounding average (4.8) and third in total assists (73). He was named to the All-Patriot League second team.

Sprinks' senior season in 2007–08 saw both him and the team continuing to improve. Navy went 16–14, finishing in second place in the regular season standings after being predicted to finish seventh during the preseason, while Sprinks scored 21.1 points per game (Navy's first 20 ppg scorer since 1991) and was named the Patriot League Player of the Year. He became the first Navy player to win the Patriot League award. He was also honored on the all-conference first team, as well as being an honorable mention NCAA All-American by the Associated Press. Sprink finished his career with 1,785 points, 592 rebounds, and 254 assists.

== Post college ==
Sprink graduated from the Naval Academy in 2008. He went on to serve in the U.S. Navy until 2017, although he is still in the U.S. Navy Reserves. In 2017 he co-founded Admiral Distribution, a construction material wholesaler in the Houston, Texas area, where he serves as in a business development capacity.
