= Zach Thomas (basketball) =

American basketball player (born 1996)

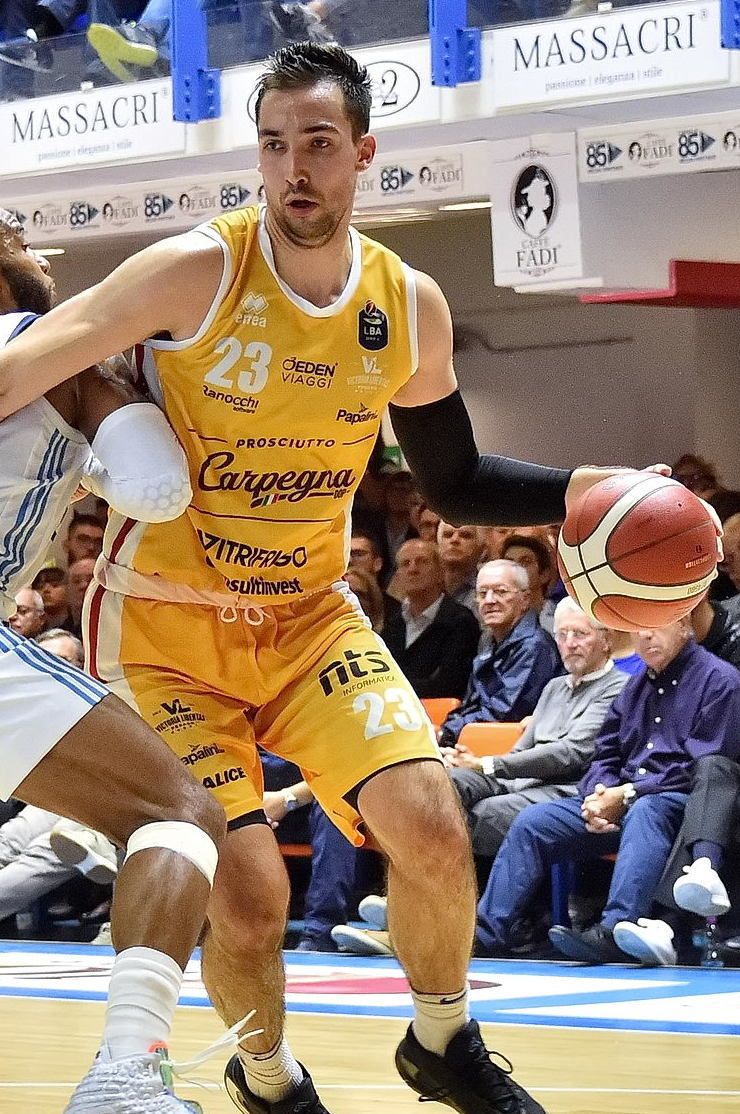
- Thomas with VL Pesaro in October 2019

No. 23 – Keravnos
- Position: Power forward
- League: Cypriot League

Personal information
- Born: June 21, 1996 (age 30) Maplewood, Minnesota, U.S.
- Listed height: 2.01 m (6 ft 7 in)
- Listed weight: 103 kg (227 lb)

Career information
- High school: Oakdale (Ijamsville, Maryland)
- College: Bucknell (2014–2018)
- NBA draft: 2018: undrafted
- Playing career: 2018–present

Career history
- 2018–2019: Okapi Aalstar
- 2019–2020: VL Pesaro
- 2020–2021: Budivelnyk
- 2021: Wilki Morskie Szczecin
- 2021–2022: Bisons Loimaa
- 2022: Norrköping Dolphins
- 2022–present: Keravnos

Career highlights
- Patriot League Player of the Year (2018); 2× First-team All-Patriot League (2017, 2018); Patriot League tournament MVP (2017)

Zachary Ryan Thomas (born June 21, 1996) is an American former professional basketball player for Keravnos of the Cypriot League. He played college basketball for Bucknell University. Thomas was a graduate assistant coach at the University of Kentucky.

== College career ==
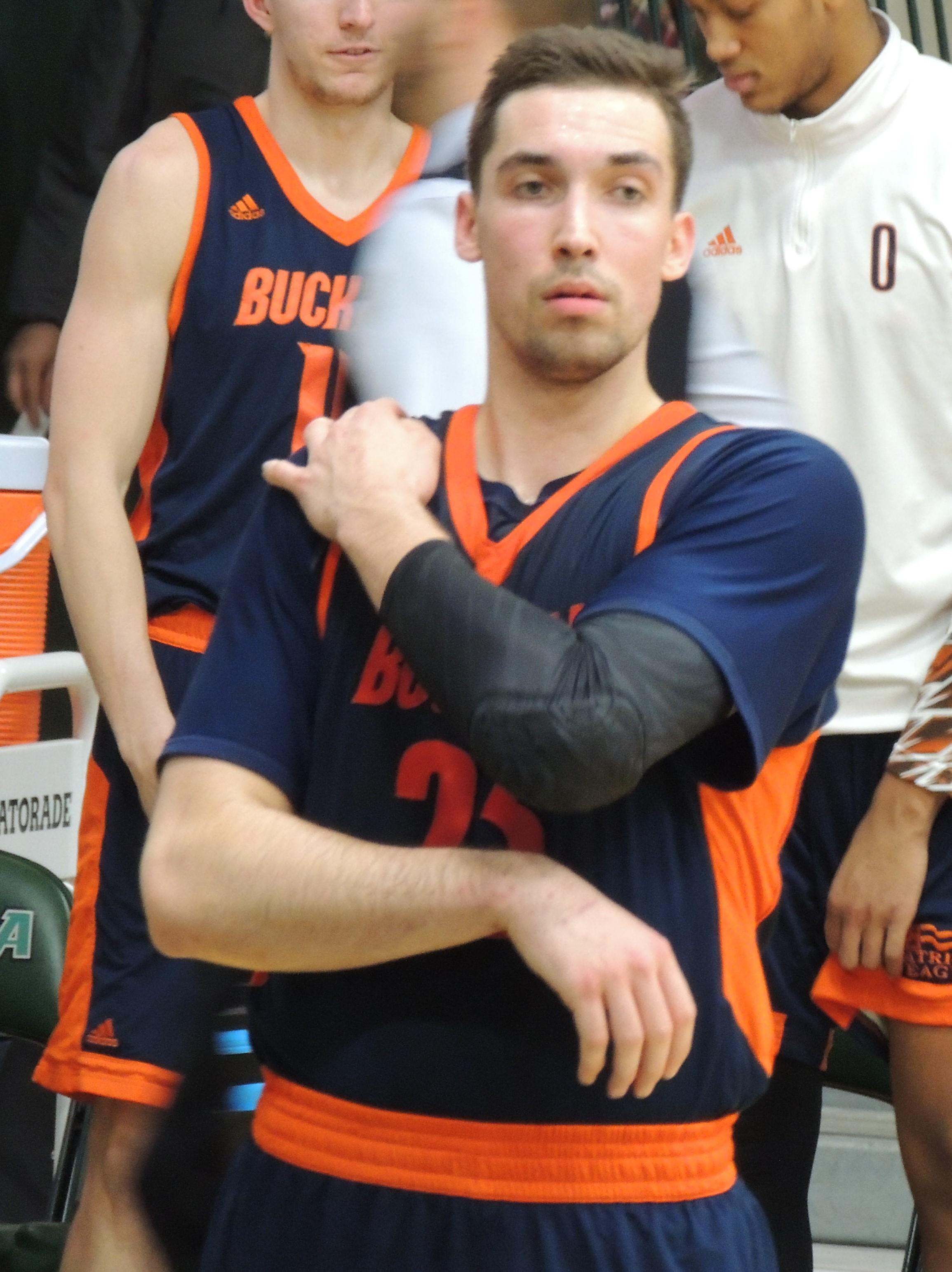
Thomas in January 2018, playing for Bucknell

A 6'7" power forward, Thomas came to Bucknell from Oakdale High School in Ijamsville, Maryland. Thomas had a standout career at Oakdale, ultimately becoming the all-time leading scorer in Frederick County history and the first player to eclipse the 2,000 point mark. He selected Bucknell based on their basketball success and academic reputation.

Thomas worked his way into the starting lineup in his sophomore season, then enjoyed a breakout season as a junior in 2016–17. He averaged 15.9 points, 6.6 rebounds and 3.4 assists per game, and was ultimately named to first-team All-Patriot League alongside classmate Nana Foulland. In the 2017 Patriot League tournament, Thomas led the Bison to the league title, scoring 17 points and grabbing 9 rebounds in the title game, earning Most Valuable Player honors. With the win, the Bison advanced to the 2017 NCAA tournament, where they lost to 4 seed West Virginia in the first round.

Thomas entered the 2017–18 season as a preseason All-Patriot League selection. Additionally, he was named to the Lou Henson Award mid-season watch list.

On February 26, 2018, Thomas was named Patriot League Player of the Year.

== Professional career ==
After going undrafted in the 2018 NBA draft, Thomas was later included in the 2018 NBA Summer League roster of the Utah Jazz. On July 27, 2018, Thomas signed with Okapi Aalstar in Belgium. After a successful year playing in Belgium, Thomas was brought into the NBA Summer League once again, this time to play for the Houston Rockets.

On July 17, 2019, he signed with VL Pesaro of Italian Lega Basket Serie A. But due to the coronavirus pandemic in Italy and the suspension of the Italian league, Thomas left the team on March 10.

On October 13, 2020, Thomas signed with BC Budivelnyk in Ukraine.

On January 6, 2021, he signed with Wilki Morskie Szczecin of the PLK. Thomas averaged 6.0 points and 2.6 rebounds per game.

On September 6, 2021, he signed with Bisons Loimaa of the Koripallon I-divisioona.

During summer 2022, he signed with Keravnos of the Cypriot League.
