= Braeden Smith =

American college basketball player (born 2004)

No. 3 – Notre Dame Fighting Irish
- Position: Point guard
- Conference: Atlantic Coast Conference

Personal information
- Born: February 9, 2004 (age 22) Charlotte, North Carolina, U.S.
- Listed height: 6 ft 0 in (1.83 m)
- Listed weight: 180 lb (82 kg)

Career information
- High school: Seattle Prep (Seattle, Washington)
- College: Colgate (2022–2024); Gonzaga (2025–2026); Notre Dame (2026–present)

Career highlights
- Patriot League Player of the Year (2024); First-team All-Patriot League (2024); Patriot League tournament MVP (2024); Patriot League All-Rookie Team (2023)

Braeden Smith (born February 9, 2004) is an American college basketball player for the Notre Dame Fighting Irish of the Atlantic Coast Conference (ACC). He previously played for the Colgate Raiders and Gonzaga Bulldogs. He was the Patriot League Player of the Year with Colgate in 2024.

== Early life and high school career ==
Smith was born in Charlotte, North Carolina, but moved to Seattle, Washington, at a young age. His parents, Reggie and Kristin Smith, played basketball in high school. He has two younger brothers. Smith attended Seattle Prep, where he was coached by Mike Kelly. In December 2021, Smith set the all-time assist and steals records and surpassed 1,000 career points in a 75–55 win over Lakeside. He committed to play college basketball at Colgate.

== College career ==
Smith averaged 11.6 points, 3.9 rebounds and 4.3 assists per game.as a freshman. He was named to the Patriot League All-Rookie Team. As a sophomore, Smith averaged 12.5 points, 5.6 rebounds and 5.5 assists per game. He was named Patriot League Player of the Year. Smith led the Raiders to the NCAA tournament, where they lost to Baylor in the first round. Following the season, he transferred to Gonzaga. Smith redshirted the 2024-25 season. He averaged 5.1 points, 3.6 assists, 2.2 rebounds, and 1.0 steals per game at Gonzaga. Smith entered the transfer portal after the season.

== Career statistics ==
Legend
GP	Games played	GS	Games started	MPG	Minutes per game
FG%	Field goal percentage	3P%	3-point field goal percentage	FT%	Free throw percentage
RPG	Rebounds per game	APG	Assists per game	SPG	Steals per game
BPG	Blocks per game	PPG	Points per game	**Bold**	Career high

=== College ===
Year	Team	GP	GS	MPG	FG%	3P%	FT%	RPG	APG	SPG	BPG	PPG
2022–23	Colgate	**35**	**35**	**31.6**	**.481**	**.361**	**.826**	3.9	4.4	1.3	**.1**	11.6
2023–24	Colgate	**35**	**35**	30.2	.393	.311	.786	**5.5**	**5.6**	**1.9**	**.1**	**12.5**
2024–25	Gonzaga	Redshirt										
2025–26	Gonzaga	**35**	18	17.1	.467	.333	.805	2.2	3.6	1.0	.0	5.1
Career		105	88	26.3	.437	.330	.806	3.8	4.6	1.4	.1	9.7
