= Patrick Whearty =

American basketball player

Personal information
- Born: August 27, 1980 (age 46) Poughkeepsie, New York, U.S.
- Listed height: 6 ft 10 in (2.08 m)
- Listed weight: 255 lb (116 kg)

Career information
- High school: Our Lady of Lourdes (Poughkeepsie, New York)
- College: Holy Cross (1998–2003)
- NBA draft: 2003: undrafted
- Playing career: 2003–2008
- Position: Center
- Number: 45

Career history
- 2003–2005: Stade Clermontois BA
- 2005–2006: Cherkaski Mavpy
- 2006: Boca Juniors
- 2006: Unión de Sunchales
- 2006: Vevey Riviera Basket
- 2006–2007: Unitri/Uberlândia
- 2007–2008: Sendai 89ers

Career highlights
- bj league All-Star (2008); AP Honorable mention All-American (2003); Patriot League Player of the Year (2003); Patriot League tournament MVP (2003); First-team All-Patriot League (2003); Patriot League All-Rookie Team (1999)

Patrick Whearty (born August 27, 1980) is an American former professional basketball player. He played college basketball at the College of the Holy Cross between 1998 and 2003, where he was the 2003 Patriot League Player of the Year. After graduating college, he had an international professional career from 2003 to 2008.

== College career ==
Born and raised in Poughkeepsie, New York, Patrick Whearty attended Our Lady of Lourdes High School but received no attention from college scouts due to injuries which prevented him from playing full seasons. He got the attention of Holy Cross because his mother called their assistant coach to tell him about an upcoming tournament that Whearty was playing in.

A 6'10" center, Whearty ultimately did play for the Holy Cross Crusaders. He played from 1998 to 2003, missing all but six games of his sophomore season in 1999–2000 due to biceps surgery, allowing him to redshirt. During his college tenure, Holy Cross won two regular season championships (2001, 2003), three conference tournament titles (2001–2003), and qualified for three consecutive NCAA Tournaments (2001–2003). He averaged 9.1 points, 5.8 rebounds, and 1.1 blocks per game for his career. Whearty finished with 1,068 points and 688 rebounds. During his senior season in 2002–03, the Crusaders went a conference-best 26–5 as Whearty averaged 12.4 points and 6.6 rebounds per game. He was also named the Most Valuable Player in the 2003 Patriot League tournament. Whearty was voted by the conference head coaches as the Patriot League Player of the Year and earned honorable mention All-American honors by the Associated Press.

== Professional career ==
After going undrafted in the 2003 NBA draft, Whearty embarked on a professional career that saw him land in France, Brazil, Argentina, Ukraine, and Japan. In 2007–08, while playing for the Sendai 89ers in the bj league (Japan), Whearty was named an All-Star. In an interview for the Holy Cross Alumni Magazine, Whearty recalled how the international leagues were a completely different vibe, including a rowdiness not seen in the United States: "I’m at home and then, 24 hours later, I'm wearing a Boca Juniors (Buenos Aires) uniform and being attacked by a bunch of crazies" and "The police barged onto the court with riot-control shields and escorted us to the team bus." Whearty also recalled how he was paid while playing in Ukraine, saying "The guy takes out a wad of bills, peels off [$35,000], puts the money in a plastic bag and hands it to me."

In 2008, Whearty retired from professional basketball.
