= Patriot League Men's Basketball Player of the Year =

Basketball personal award

- Awarded for: the most outstanding basketball player in the Patriot League
- Country: United States

History
- First award: 1991
- Most recent: Austin Benigni, Navy

The Patriot League Men's Basketball Player of the Year is an award given to the Patriot League's most outstanding player. The award was first given following the 1990–91 season, the first under the Patriot League name and also the league's first season as an all-sports conference. There have been five repeat winners of the award: Adonal Foyle of Colgate (1996, 1997), Brian Ehlers of Lafayette (1999, 2000), CJ McCollum of Lehigh (2010, 2012), Mike Muscala of Bucknell (2011, 2013), and Tim Kempton Jr. of Lehigh (2015, 2016). Bucknell claims the most awards (9) while Colgate is second with seven. Bucknell has the most individual players honored with eight. Two Patriot League members have not had a winner, Army and Loyola Maryland.

== Key ==
†	Co-Players of the Year
*	Awarded a national player of the year award that same season: UPI College Basketball Player of the Year (1954–55 to 1995–96); Oscar Robertson Trophy (1958–59 to present); Naismith College Player of the Year (1968–69 to present); John R. Wooden Award (1976–77 to present)
Player (X)	Denotes the number of times the player has been awarded the Patriot League Player of the Year award at that point

== Winners ==
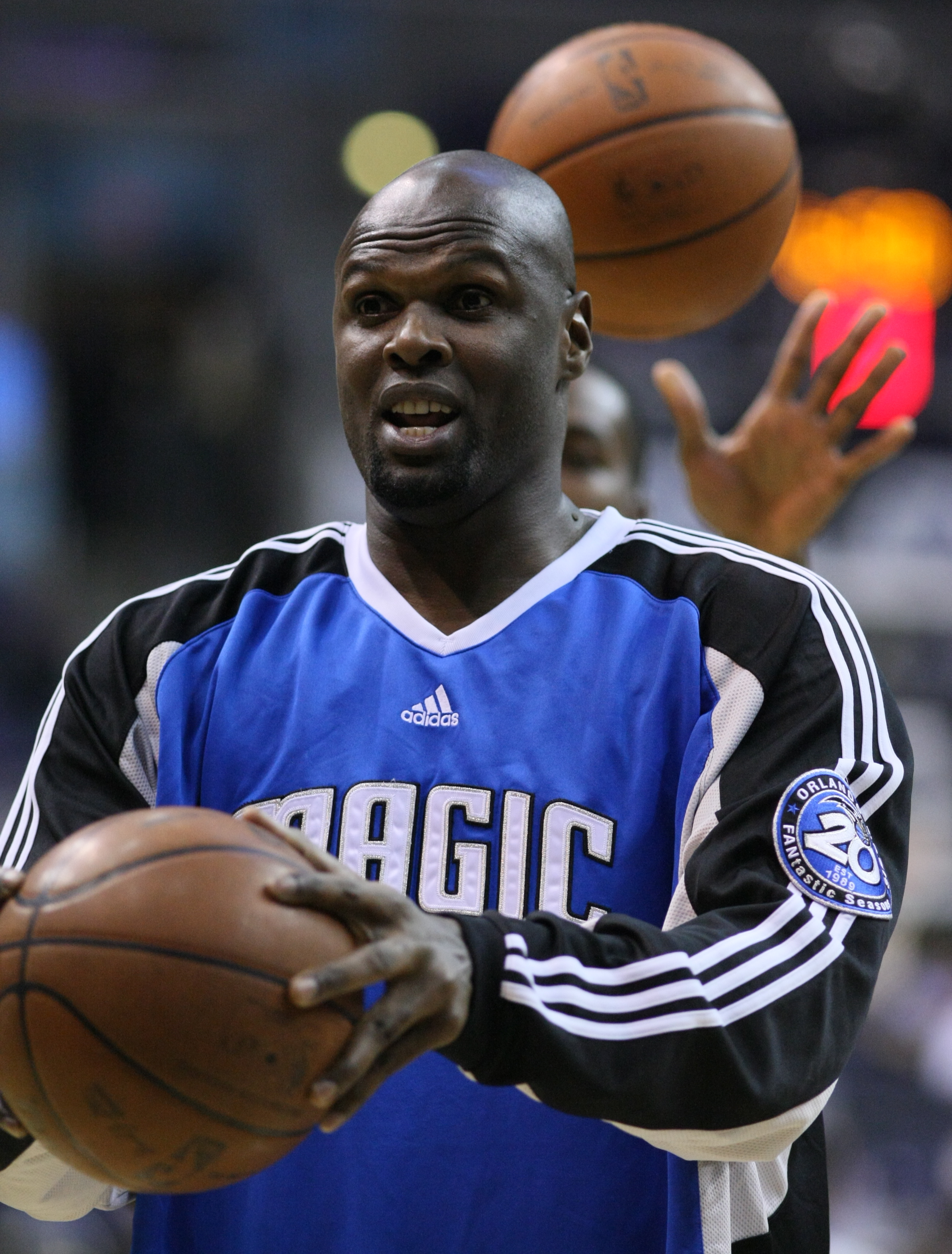
Adonal Foyle, Colgate, 1996 and 1997

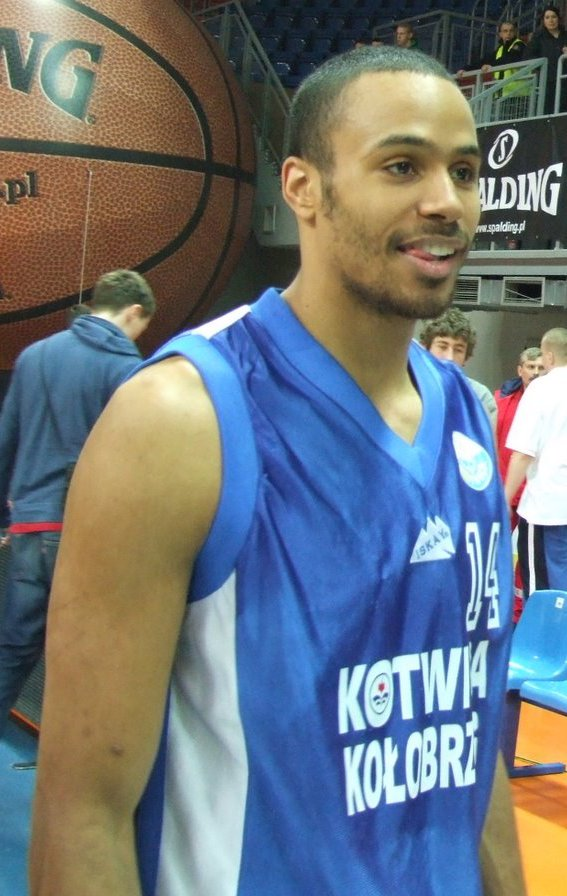
Kevin Hamilton, Holy Cross, 2005

Greg Sprink, Navy, 2008

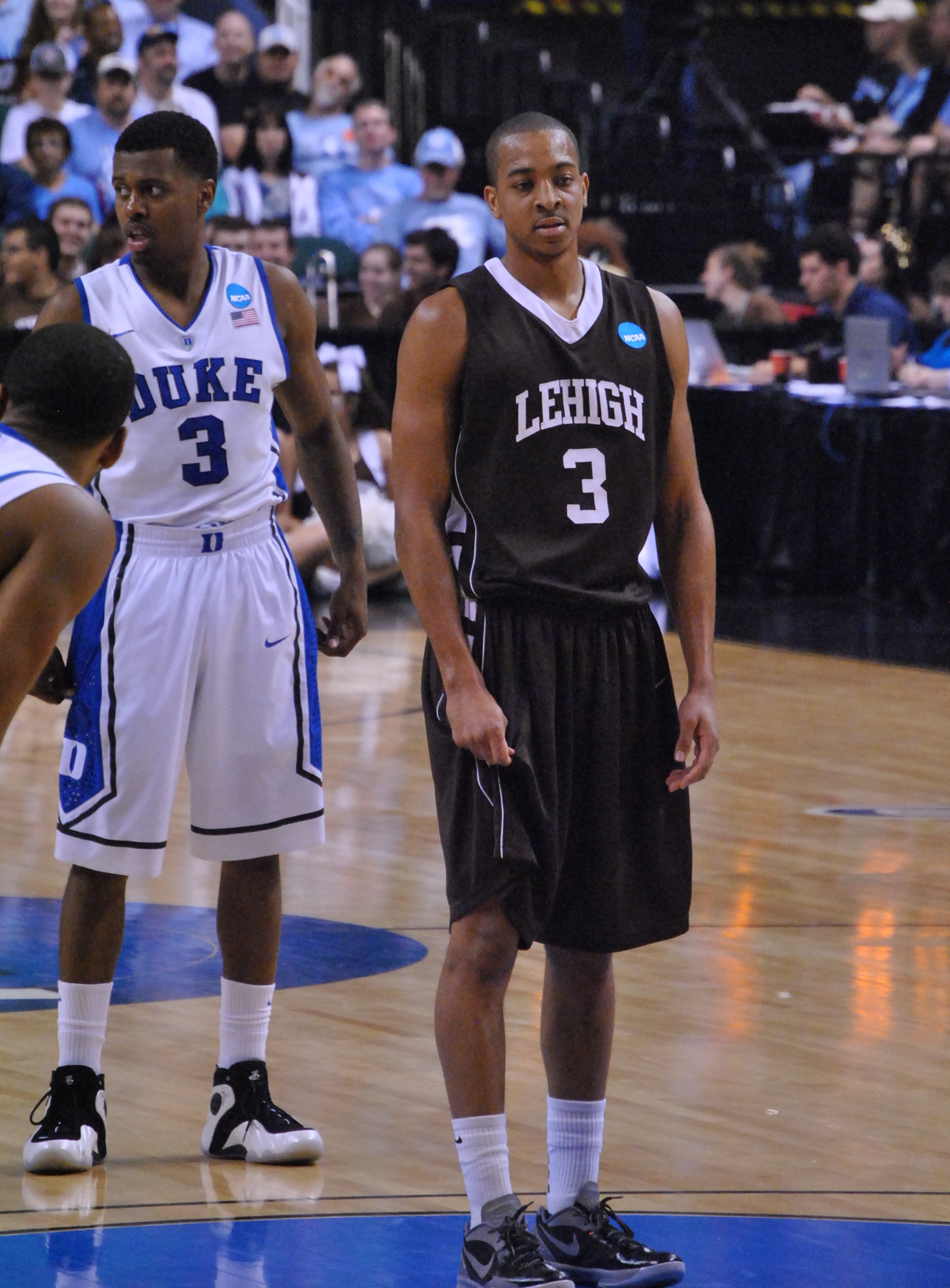
CJ McCollum, Lehigh, 2010 and 2012

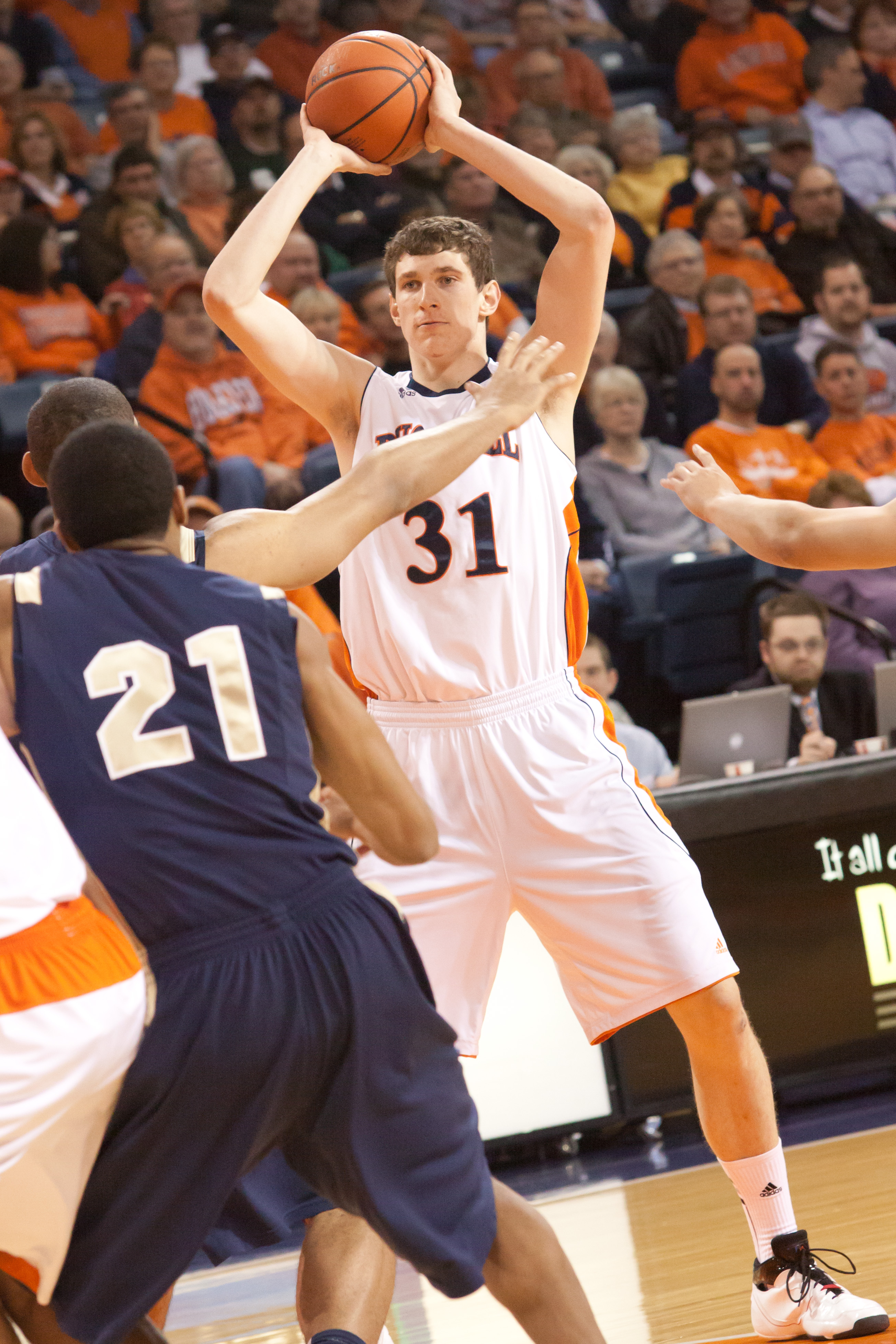
Mike Muscala, Bucknell, 2011 and 2013

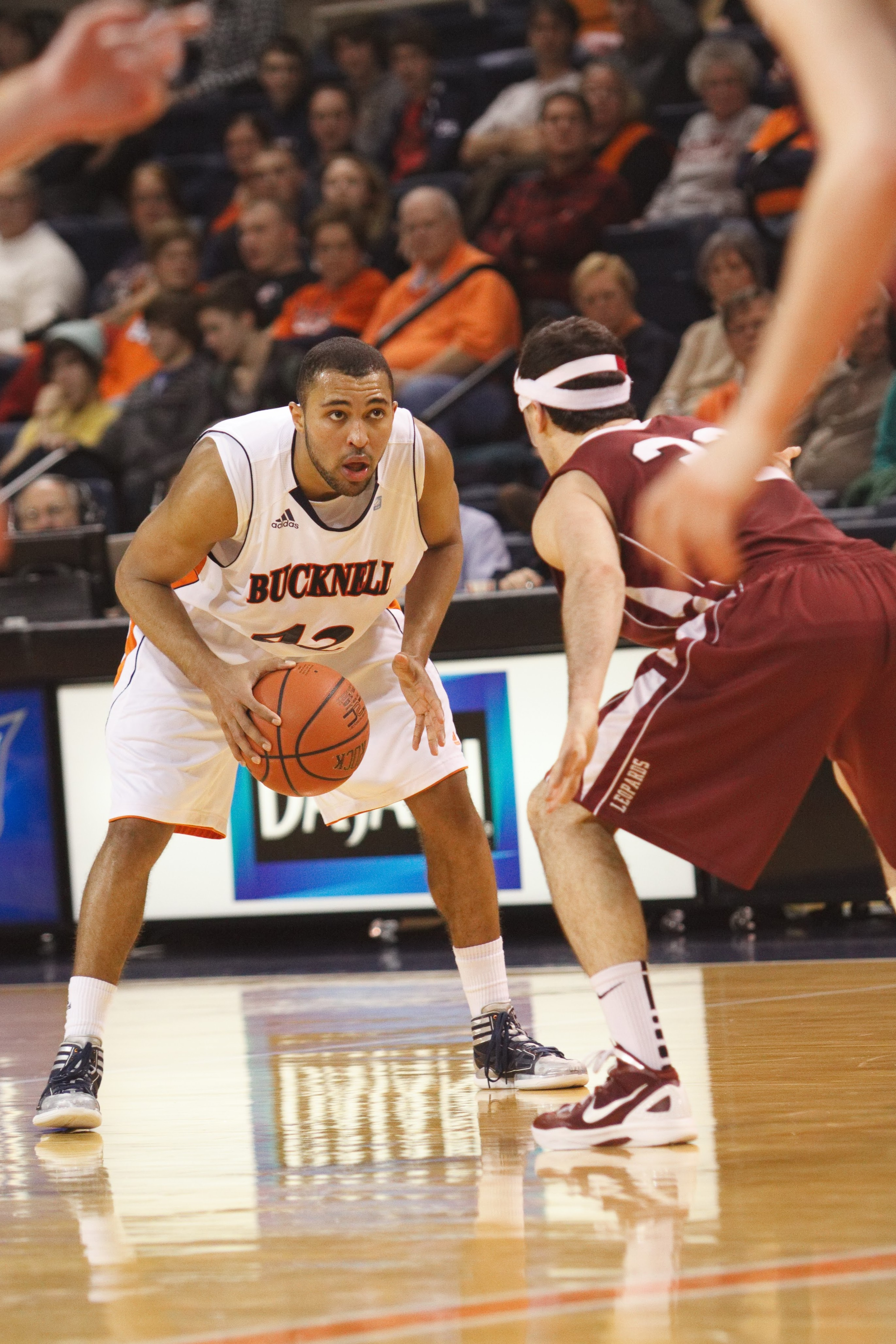
Cameron Ayers, Bucknell, 2014

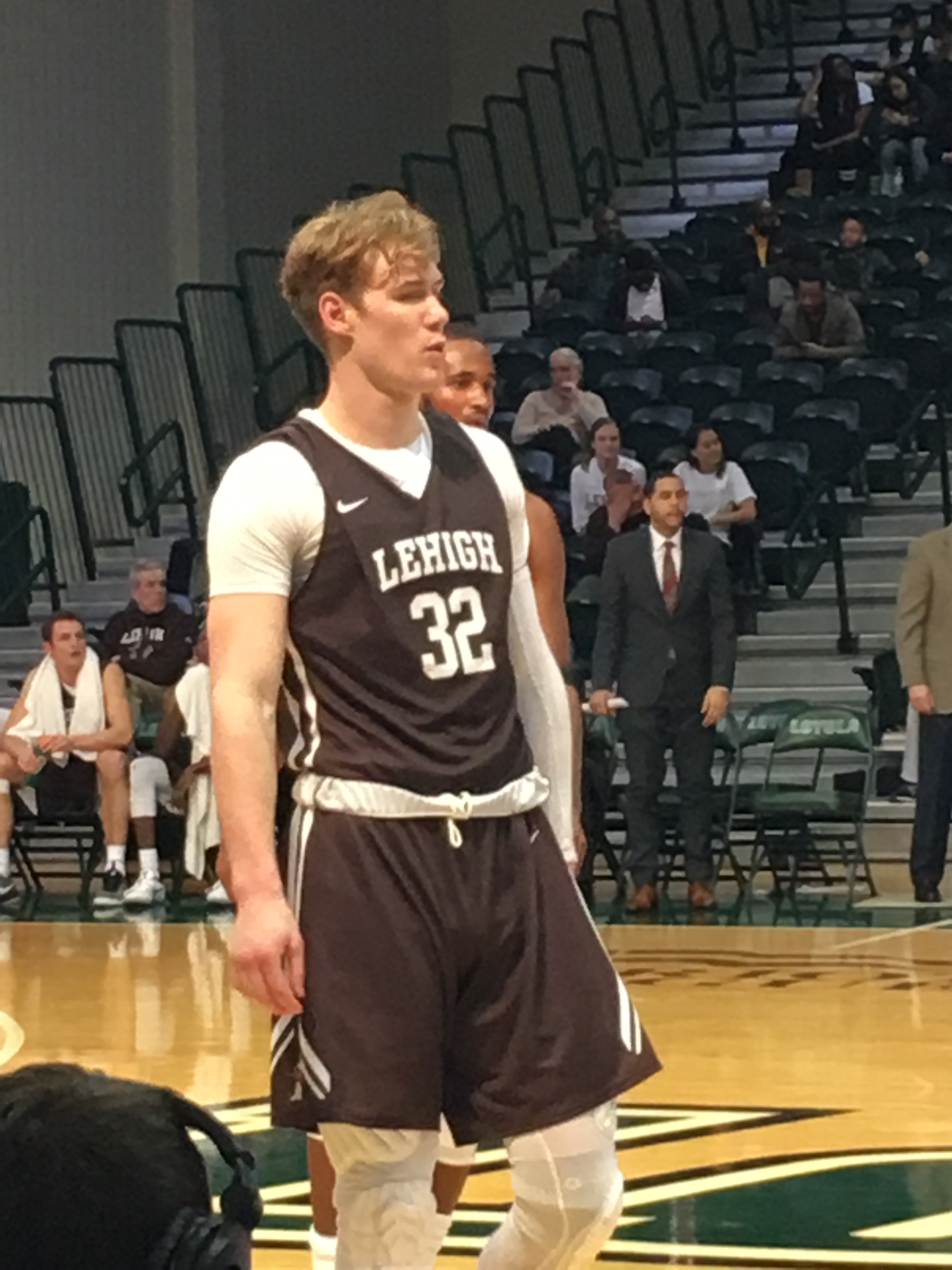
Tim Kempton Jr., Lehigh, 2015 and 2016

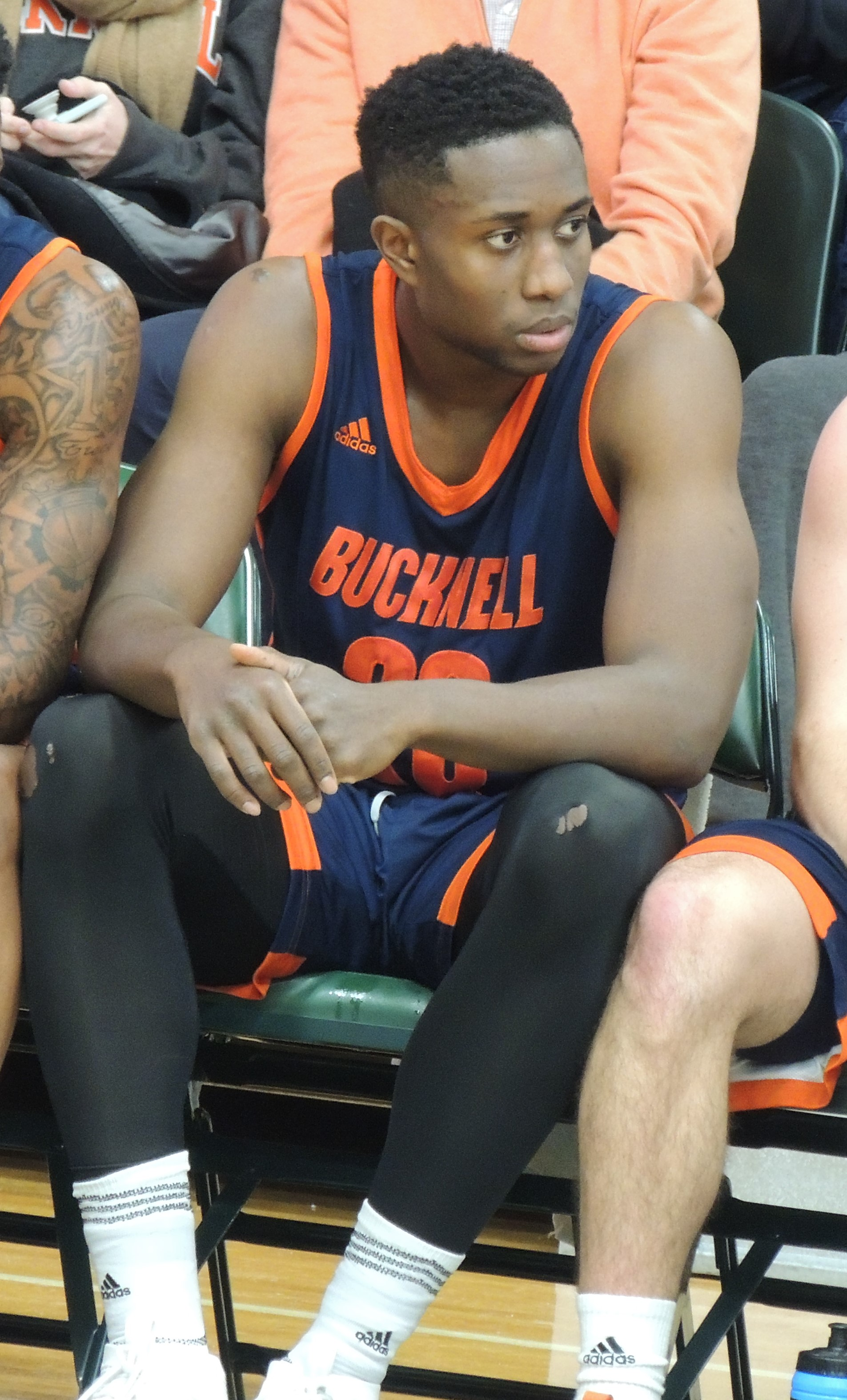
Nana Foulland, Bucknell, 2017

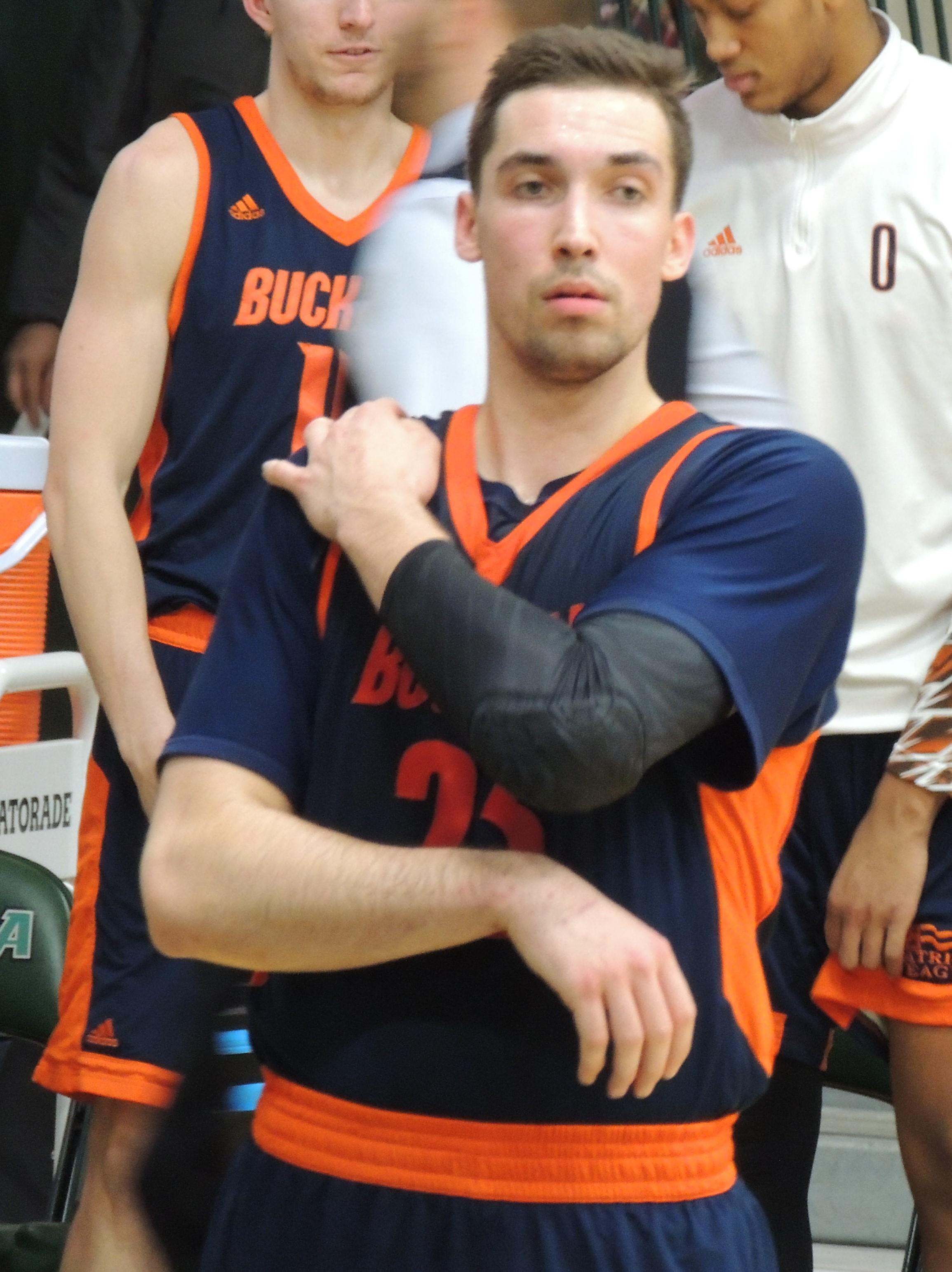
Zach Thomas, Bucknell, 2018

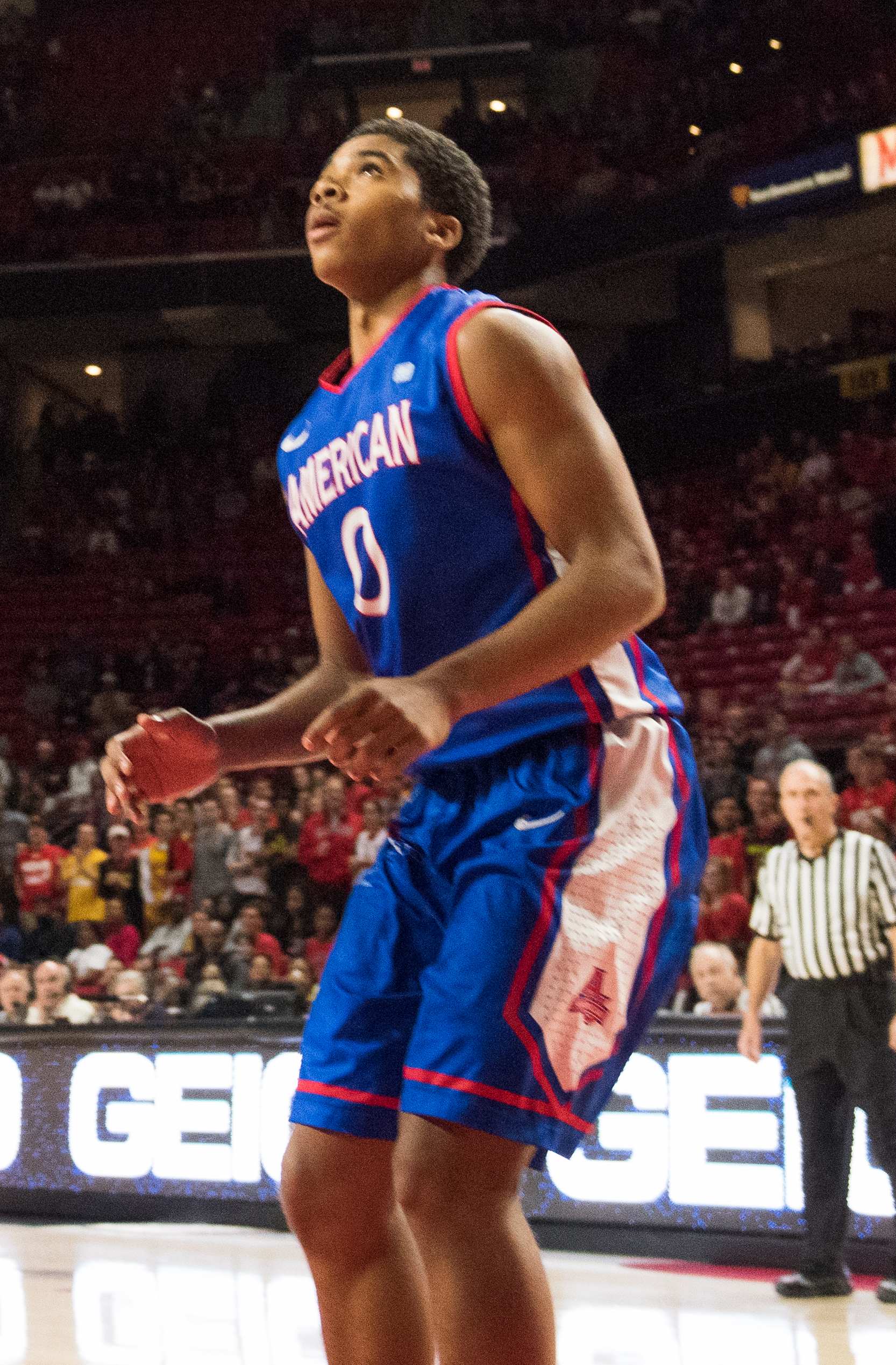
Sa'eed Nelson, American, 2020

Season	Player	School	Position	Class	Reference
1990–91	Damon Lopez	Fordham	C	Senior	
1991–92	Patrick King	Bucknell	SF	Senior	
1992–93	Mike Bright	Bucknell	SF	Senior	
1993–94	Tucker Neale	Colgate	SG	Junior	
1994–95	Rob Feaster	Holy Cross	PF	Senior	
1995–96	Adonal Foyle	Colgate	C	Sophomore	
1996–97	Adonal Foyle (2)	Colgate	C	Junior	
1997–98	Stefan Ciosici	Lafayette	C	Junior	
1998–99	Brian Ehlers	Lafayette	SG / PG	Junior	
1999–00	Brian Ehlers (2)	Lafayette	SG / PG	Senior	
2000–01	Tim Szatko	Holy Cross	PF	Sophomore	
2001–02	Patrick Doctor	American	PF / C	Senior	
2002–03	Patrick Whearty	Holy Cross	C	Senior	
2003–04	Austen Rowland	Lehigh	PG	Senior	
2004–05	Kevin Hamilton	Holy Cross	SG / PG	Junior	
2005–06	Charles Lee	Bucknell	G	Senior	
2006–07	Keith Simmons	Holy Cross	G	Senior	
2007–08	Greg Sprink	Navy	G	Senior	
2008–09	Derrick Mercer	American	PG	Senior	
2009–10	CJ McCollum	Lehigh	PG	Freshman	
2010–11	Mike Muscala	Bucknell	PF / C	Sophomore	
2011–12	CJ McCollum (2)	Lehigh	PG	Junior	
2012–13	Mike Muscala (2)	Bucknell	PF / C	Senior	
2013–14	Cameron Ayers	Bucknell	PG / SG	Senior	
2014–15	Tim Kempton Jr.	Lehigh	PF / C	Sophomore	
2015–16	Tim Kempton Jr. (2)	Lehigh	PF / C	Junior	
2016–17	Nana Foulland	Bucknell	C	Junior	
2017–18	Zach Thomas	Bucknell	PF	Senior	
2018–19	Rapolas Ivanauskas	Colgate	PF	Junior	
2019–20	Sa'eed Nelson	American	PG	Senior	
2020–21	Jordan Burns	Colgate	PG	Senior	
2021–22	Sukhmail Mathon	Boston University	PF	Graduate	
2022–23	Tucker Richardson	Colgate	PG	Senior	
2023–24	Braeden Smith	Colgate	PG	Sophomore	
2024–25	Noah Williamson	Bucknell	C	Junior	
2025–26	Austin Benigni	Navy	G	Senior	

== Winners by school ==
School (year joined)	Winners	Years
Bucknell (1990)	9	1992, 1993, 2006, 2011, 2013, 2014, 2017, 2018, 2025
Colgate (1990)	7	1994, 1996, 1997, 2019, 2021, 2023, 2024
Holy Cross (1990)	5	1995, 2001, 2003, 2005, 2007
Lehigh (1990)	5	2004, 2010, 2012, 2015, 2016
American (2001)	3	2002, 2009, 2020
Lafayette (1990)	3	1998, 1999, 2000
Navy (1991)	2	2008, 2026
Boston University (2013)	1	2022
Fordham (1990)^{[a]} ^{b}	1	1991
Army (1990)^{a}	0	—
Loyola (MD) (2013)	0	—

- ^{a} Fordham and Army were not charter members of the conference when it was established as the football-only Colonial League in 1986. They became members in 1990 when the conference became an all-sports league (and also adopted its current name).
- ^{b} Fordham left for the Atlantic 10 Conference in 1995. They are still a Patriot League associate member in football.
