= Mike Muscala =

American basketball player (born 1991)

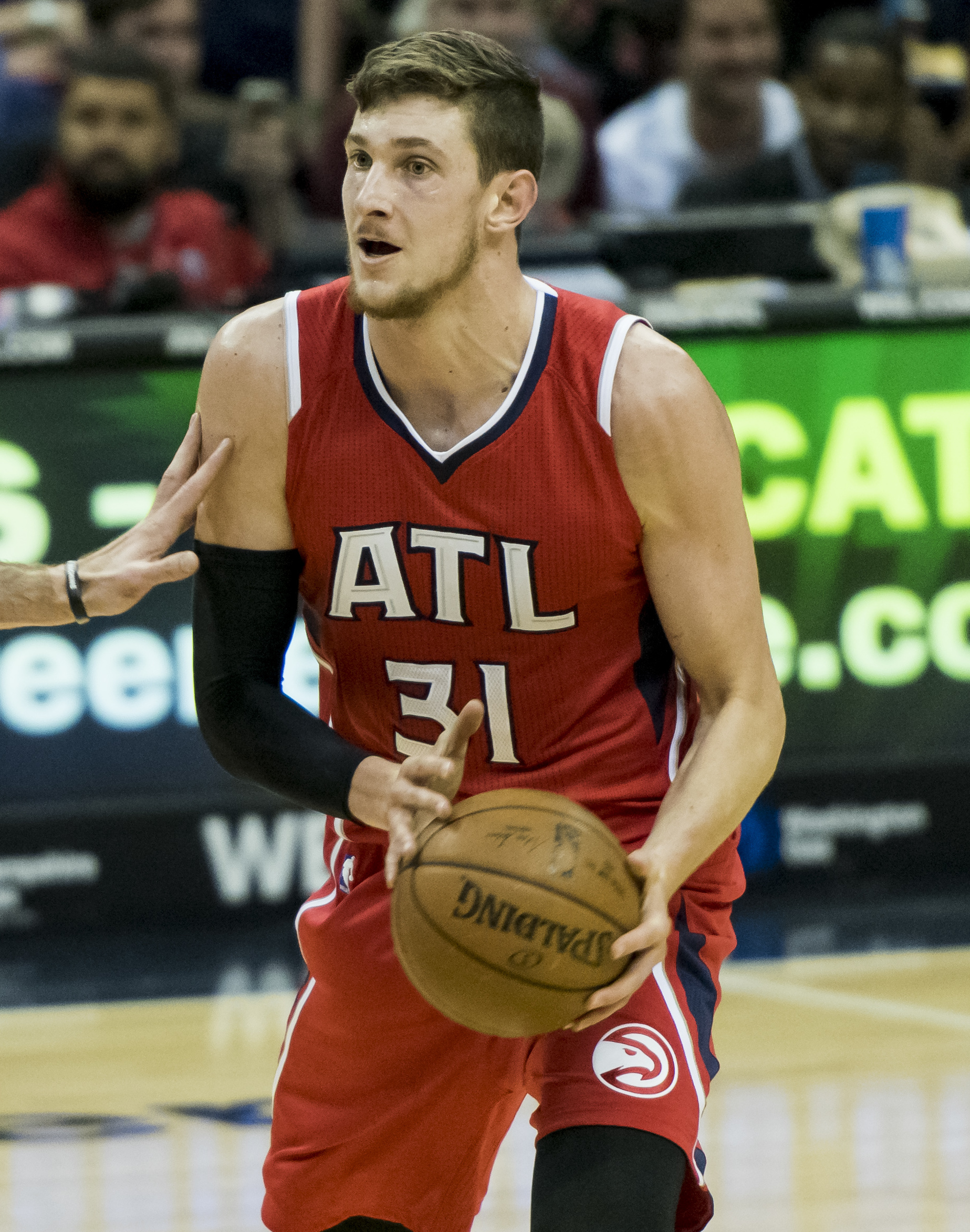
- Muscala with the Atlanta Hawks in 2015

Phoenix Suns
- Title: Assistant coach
- League: NBA

Personal information
- Born: July 1, 1991 (age 35) St. Louis Park, Minnesota, U.S.
- Listed height: 6 ft 10 in (2.08 m)
- Listed weight: 240 lb (109 kg)

Career information
- High school: Roseville Area (Roseville, Minnesota)
- College: Bucknell (2009–2013)
- NBA draft: 2013: 2nd round, 44th overall pick
- Drafted by: Dallas Mavericks
- Playing career: 2013–2024
- Position: Power forward
- Number: 31, 33, 57, 35, 41, 50

Career history

Playing
- 2013–2014: Obradoiro CAB
- 2014–2018: Atlanta Hawks
- 2014–2015: →Fort Wayne Mad Ants
- 2017: →Erie BayHawks
- 2018–2019: Philadelphia 76ers
- 2019: Los Angeles Lakers
- 2019–2023: Oklahoma City Thunder
- 2023: Boston Celtics
- 2023–2024: Washington Wizards
- 2024: Detroit Pistons
- 2024: Oklahoma City Thunder

Coaching
- 2025–present: Phoenix Suns (assistant)

Career highlights
- 2× AP honorable mention All-American (2011, 2013); 2× Patriot League Player of the Year (2011, 2013); 3× First-team All-Patriot League (2011–2013); 2× Patriot League tournament MVP (2011, 2013); Third-team Academic All-America (2013); No. 31 retired by Bucknell Bison
- Stats at NBA.com
- Stats at Basketball Reference

Michael Peter Muscala (/məˈskɑːlə/ mə-SKAH-lə; born July 1, 1991) is an American professional basketball coach and former player who currently serves as an assistant coach for the Phoenix Suns of the National Basketball Association (NBA). He played eleven seasons in the NBA for the Atlanta Hawks, Philadelphia 76ers, Los Angeles Lakers, Oklahoma City Thunder, Boston Celtics, Washington Wizards, and Detroit Pistons. He played college basketball for the Bucknell Bison.

== Early life ==
Muscala was born on July 1, 1991, in St. Louis Park, Minnesota. He has a stepsister. Muscala grew up in Minnesota, and attended schools in Roseville, Minnesota, graduating from Roseville Area High School.

== College career ==
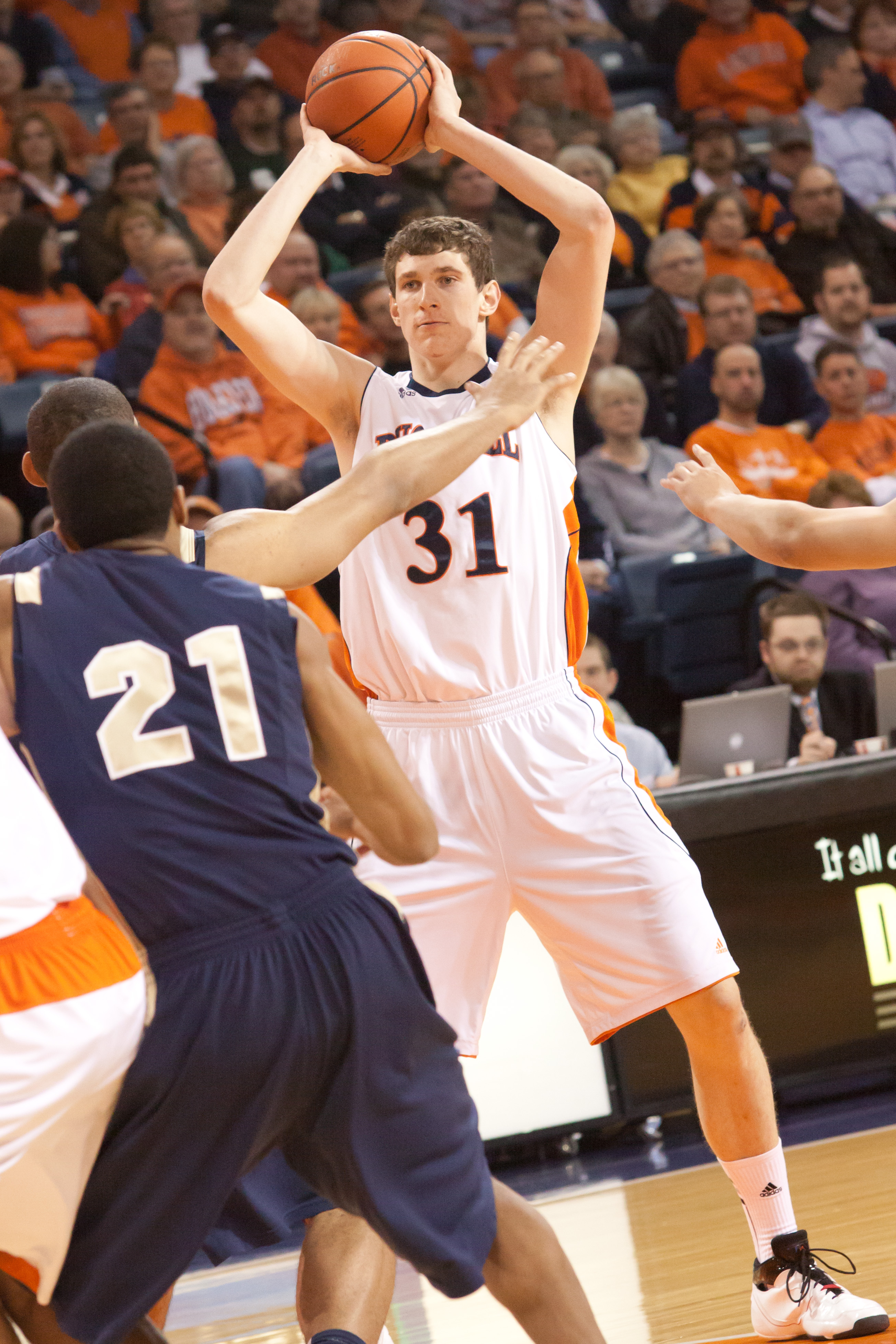
Muscala left Bucknell as the school's all-time leading scorer.

Muscala played for the Bucknell Bison men's basketball team for four seasons. He was the 2011 Patriot League Men's Basketball Player of the Year after leading the Bison to an NCAA tournament appearance. In addition, he was named to the First Team All-Patriot League and AP All-American Honorable Mention in 2010–2011. He was a 2012–13 Academic All-America selection. He was also a 2012–13 Senior CLASS Award finalist. In 2013, Muscala also won the Patriot League Player of the Year, Defensive Player of the Year, and earned First-Team All Conference honors, becoming the first player in Patriot League history to earn Player of the Year and Tournament MVP twice. During his 2012–13 campaign, Muscala also became Bucknell's all-time leading scorer, surpassing Al Leslie's 32-year record.

On February 16, 2020, Bucknell retired Muscala's number 31. He became the third player in school history so honored.

== Professional career ==
=== Obradoiro (2013–2014) ===
On June 27, 2013, Muscala was selected by the Dallas Mavericks with the 44th overall pick in the 2013 NBA draft. He was subsequently traded to the Atlanta Hawks on draft night, and later joined the Hawks for the 2013 NBA Summer League.

On August 1, 2013, Muscala signed a one-year deal with Río Natura Monbús Obradoiro of the Liga ACB. On February 25, 2014, he parted ways with Obradoiro and returned to the United States. In 20 games for the club, he averaged 14.6 points, 7.8 rebounds and 1.1 assists per game.

=== Atlanta Hawks (2014–2018) ===
On February 27, 2014, Muscala signed a multi-year deal with the Atlanta Hawks. He made his debut for the Hawks on March 2, recording four points and five rebounds in a loss to the Phoenix Suns. In the team's regular season finale on April 16, Muscala scored a season-high 15 points in a 111–103 win over the Milwaukee Bucks.

In July 2014, Muscala re-joined the Hawks for the 2014 NBA Summer League. During the 2014–15 season, he received multiple assignments to the Fort Wayne Mad Ants of the NBA Development League. On March 28, 2015, he had a season-best game with 18 points, 10 rebounds, 4 assists, 1 steal and 2 blocks in a loss to the Charlotte Hornets.

Muscala again played for the Hawks' summer league team in 2015, averaging 9.8 points and 7.3 rebounds in six games. On February 3, 2016, he scored a season-high 12 points in a 125–86 win over the Philadelphia 76ers. On March 26, 2016, he was presented with the Jason Collier Memorial Trophy for being the player who best exemplifies the characteristics Collier displayed off the court as a community ambassador.

On June 29, 2016, the Hawks exercised the option for the 2016–17 season on Muscala's contract.

On July 25, 2017, Muscala re-signed with the Hawks. On March 11, 2018, he scored a career-high 19 points in a 129–122 loss to the Chicago Bulls. On March 28, 2018, he set a new career high and led all scorers with 24 points in a 126–114 loss to the Minnesota Timberwolves.

=== Philadelphia 76ers (2018–2019) ===
On July 25, 2018, Muscala was traded to the Philadelphia 76ers in a three-team deal involving the Hawks and the Oklahoma City Thunder.

=== Los Angeles Lakers (2019) ===
On February 6, 2019, Muscala was traded, along with Wilson Chandler, Landry Shamet and a number of future draft picks, to the Los Angeles Clippers in exchange for Tobias Harris, Boban Marjanović and Mike Scott. The following day, he was traded to the Los Angeles Lakers in exchange for Michael Beasley and Ivica Zubac.

=== Oklahoma City Thunder (2019–2023) ===
On July 10, 2019, Muscala signed a 2-year deal with the Oklahoma City Thunder.

Following his tenure with Philadelphia, Muscala is indirectly credited by fans for the 76ers' drafting of Tyrese Maxey. In August 2020, his game-winning three-point shot against the Heat ensured the Thunder's protected 2020 pick would fall to #21. The game was inconsequential to that year's playoffs but Oklahoma City trading the rights to the pick in the upcoming draft (rather than future second round picks) was contingent on staying in the top 20. Philadelphia later selected Maxey at 21st overall with the Thunder's selection via Orlando.

In November 2020, Muscala exercised his player option and returned for a second season with the Thunder. On January 25, 2021, Muscala made a career-high six three-pointers and scored 23 points during a 125–122 win over the Portland Trail Blazers.

On August 12, 2021, Muscala re-signed with the Thunder. On March 8, 2022, he underwent season-ending surgery on his right ankle.

On August 4, 2022, Muscala re-signed with the Thunder.

=== Boston Celtics (2023) ===
On February 9, 2023, Muscala was traded to the Boston Celtics in exchange for Justin Jackson and two future second-round draft picks. Muscala made his Celtics debut a day later, recording 12 points and two rebounds in a 127–116 win over the Charlotte Hornets.

Muscala wore No. 57 in Boston to honor his late mother, who was born in 1957.

=== Washington Wizards (2023–2024) ===
On June 22, 2023, the Celtics traded Muscala to the Washington Wizards as part of a three–team deal involving the Memphis Grizzlies. The Wizards received Muscala, Danilo Gallinari, and the No.35 overall pick in the 2023 NBA draft from Boston as well as Tyus Jones from Memphis in exchange for Kristaps Porzingis who landed in Boston. Additionally, Boston received the No. 25 overall pick in the 2023 NBA draft and a 2024 first round pick (via GSW) from Memphis, while the Grizzlies acquired Marcus Smart.

=== Detroit Pistons (2024) ===
On January 14, 2024, Muscala was traded to the Detroit Pistons, along with Danilo Gallinari, in exchange for Marvin Bagley III, Isaiah Livers and future draft considerations. He was bought out on February 28, after playing 13 games.

=== Second stint with Oklahoma City (2024) ===
On March 2, 2024, Muscala signed with the Oklahoma City Thunder. On July 13, Muscala announced his retirement from professional basketball.

== Coaching career ==
On August 9, 2025, the Phoenix Suns hired Muscala as an assistant coach under head coach Jordan Ott.

== Career statistics ==
Legend
GP	Games played	GS	Games started	MPG	Minutes per game
FG%	Field goal percentage	3P%	3-point field goal percentage	FT%	Free throw percentage
RPG	Rebounds per game	APG	Assists per game	SPG	Steals per game
BPG	Blocks per game	PPG	Points per game	**Bold**	Career high

=== NBA ===
==== Regular season ====
Year	Team	GP	GS	MPG	FG%	3P%	FT%	RPG	APG	SPG	BPG	PPG
2013–14	Atlanta	20	0	10.7	.425	.000	**1.000**	2.6	.4	.2	.5	3.8
2014–15	Atlanta	40	**8**	12.6	**.550**	.409	.880	3.0	.6	.4	.5	4.9
2015–16	Atlanta	60	0	9.4	.500	.308	.795	2.0	.6	.2	.5	3.3
2016–17	Atlanta	**70**	3	17.7	.504	.418	.766	3.4	**1.4**	.4	**.6**	6.2
2017–18	Atlanta	53	7	20.0	.458	.371	.919	**4.3**	1.0	**.6**	.5	7.6
2018–19	Philadelphia	47	6	**22.2**	.392	.342	.818	**4.3**	1.3	.4	**.6**	7.4
2018–19	L.A. Lakers	17	4	15.6	.434	.368	.875	2.6	.8	.2	**.6**	5.9
2019–20	Oklahoma City	47	2	12.2	.407	.378	.818	2.3	.9	.2	.3	4.8
2020–21	Oklahoma City	35	0	18.4	.446	.370	.917	3.8	.8	.2	.3	**9.7**
2021–22	Oklahoma City	43	0	13.8	.456	**.429**	.842	3.0	.5	.4	**.6**	8.0
2022–23	Oklahoma City	43	5	14.5	.438	.394	.795	3.1	.9	.3	.4	6.2
2022–23	Boston	20	4	16.2	.472	.385	.692	3.4	.6	.2	.3	5.9
2023–24	Washington	24	2	14.1	.367	.275	.750	3.1	.9	.2	.3	4.0
2023–24	Detroit	13	4	13.2	.341	.382	.500	2.2	.8	.2	.4	3.5
2023–24	Oklahoma City	16	0	5.7	.364	.091	.000	1.3	.3	.1	.1	1.1
Career		548	45	15.0	.451	.373	.830	3.1	.8	.3	.5	5.9

==== Playoffs ====
Year	Team	GP	GS	MPG	FG%	3P%	FT%	RPG	APG	SPG	BPG	PPG
2014	Atlanta	2	0	2.5	.000	.000	.000	.0	.0	.0	.0	.0
2015	Atlanta	**10**	0	10.2	**.606**	.250	.000	1.8	.1	.1	.3	**4.2**
2016	Atlanta	9	0	7.4	.500	.333	**1.000**	1.9	.3	.0	.1	2.7
2017	Atlanta	6	0	**13.5**	.278	.000	.875	**2.7**	.3	**.2**	**.5**	2.8
2020	Oklahoma City	2	0	10.0	.500	**1.000**	.000	2.0	**.5**	.0	.0	1.5
2023	Boston	6	0	3.5	.500	.500	.750	.7	.2	.0	.0	1.5
Career		35	0	8.4	.481	.304	.857	1.7	.2	.1	.2	2.7

=== College ===
Year	Team	GP	GS	MPG	FG%	3P%	FT%	RPG	APG	SPG	BPG	PPG
2009–10	Bucknell	30	16	24.8	.462	.300	.806	4.9	.7	.3	2.1	9.8
2010–11	Bucknell	34	34	27.8	**.517**	**.364**	.816	7.3	1.3	.4	1.9	14.9
2011–12	Bucknell	**35**	**35**	29.9	.504	.350	**.853**	9.0	1.8	.4	1.6	17.0
2012–13	Bucknell	34	34	**31.7**	.509	.250	.789	**11.1**	**2.2**	**.5**	**15.3**	**18.7**
Career		133	119	28.7	.501	.313	.819	8.2	1.5	.4	2.0	15.3

== See also ==
- List of NCAA Division I men's basketball players with 2000 points and 1000 rebounds
