= Bryan Cohen =

American-Israeli basketball player

Bryan Cohen בריאן כהן
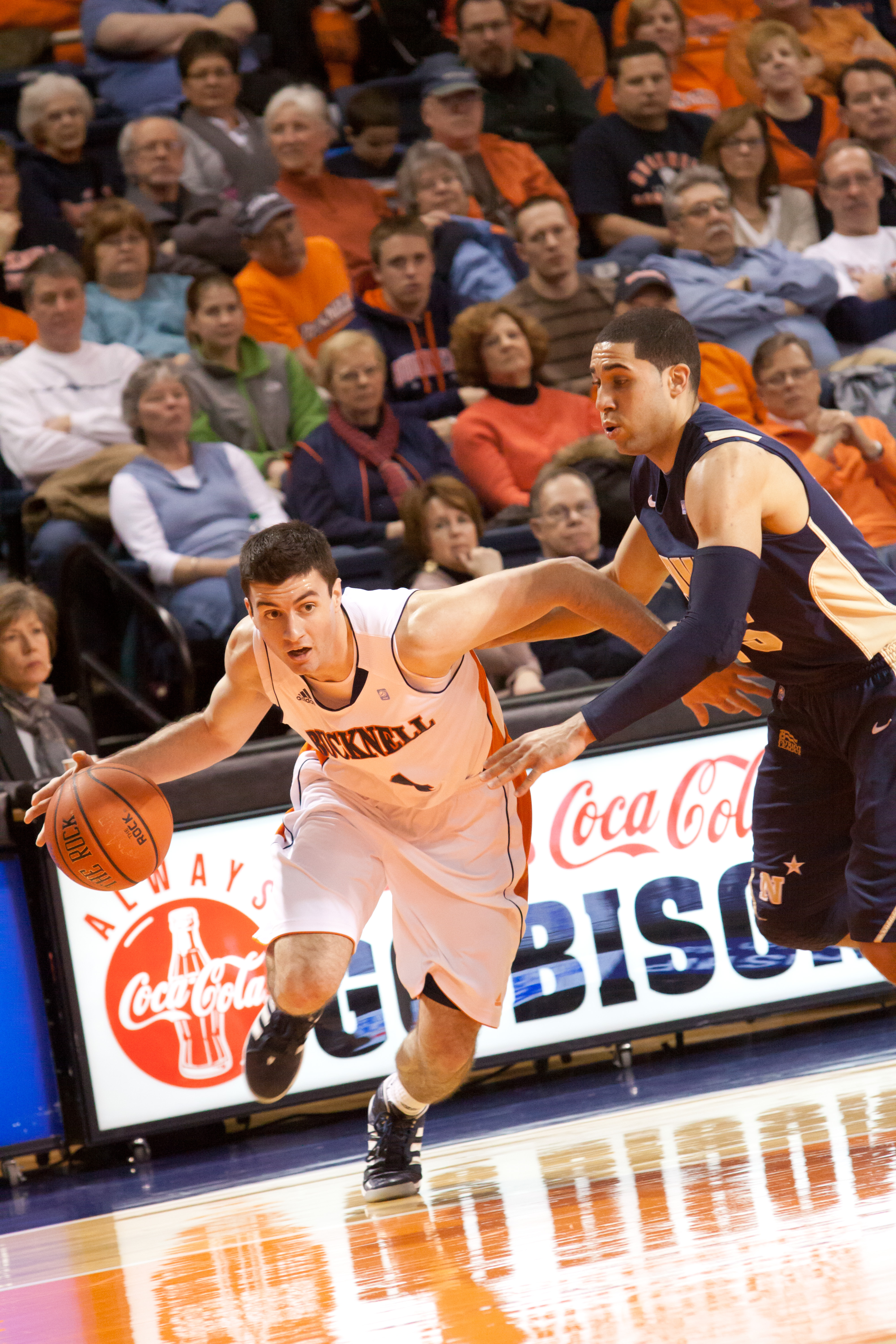
- Cohen playing for the Bucknell Bison in 2012

Personal information
- Born: May 10, 1989 (age 37) Huntingdon Valley, Pennsylvania, U.S.
- Listed height: 6 ft 6 in (1.98 m)
- Listed weight: 224 lb (102 kg)

Career information
- High school: Abington Friends School (Jenkintown, Pennsylvania)
- College: Bucknell (2008–2012)
- NBA draft: 2012: undrafted
- Playing career: 2012–2014
- Position: Shooting guard

Career history
- 2012–2014: Maccabi Haifa

Bryan Cohen (Hebrew: בריאן כהן; born May 10, 1989) is an American-Israeli former basketball player. He played the shooting guard position. He won a gold medal with Team USA in the 2009 Maccabiah Games. He played college basketball for the Bucknell Bison and was the Patriot League Defensive Player of Year in 2010, 2011, and 2012—the only player in league history to win the award three times. He played from 2012 to 2014 for Maccabi Haifa in the Israeli Basketball Premier League.

== Early life and education ==
Bryan Cohen was born on May 10, 1989, in Huntingdon Valley, Pennsylvania. He is Jewish, and has dual U.S.–Israeli citizenship. His older brother Aron Cohen played basketball for the University of Pennsylvania.

== Athletic career ==
Cohen attended Abington Friends School, graduating in 2008. He played basketball for the Kangaroos.

Cohen played basketball for Team USA in the 2009 Maccabiah Games, winning a gold medal.

He next attended Bucknell University, graduating with a degree in economics in 2012. Cohen played basketball for the Bucknell Bison as a starting guard from 2008 to 2012. His 353 points as a freshman in 2008–09 were the fourth-most by a freshman in Bucknell history, and he was named All-Rookie Patriot League. In 2009–2010 he ranked ninth in the Patriot League in assists (84) and assists per game (2.7). In 2011–12 he was seventh in the Patriot League in assists (87), and eighth in assists per game (2.5).

He was named Patriot League Defensive Player of Year in 2010, 2011, and 2012; he was the only player in league history to win the award three times, and the seventh in any NCAA Division I conference to win a defensive MVP award three times. He was named second-team All-Patriot League as a senior. His 313 career assists ranked eighth in school history. He was awarded the Bradley N. Tufts Award, presented to a Bucknell senior student-athlete in recognition of exceptional athletic achievements.

Cohen played from 2012 to 2014 for Maccabi Haifa in the Israeli Basketball Premier League.

== Business career ==
Cohen became a licensed insurance agent and worked for Liberty Mutual from 2014 to 2017. From 2015 to 2019 he worked as an Acquisition Analyst & Property Manager for CB Property Management LLC in Philadelphia. He joined Full Court Development of Philadelphia in 2019 as a leasing agent.

== Awards and honors ==
In 2021, Cohen was inducted into the Philadelphia Jewish Sports Hall of Fame.
