= Tim Kempton Jr. =

American basketball player

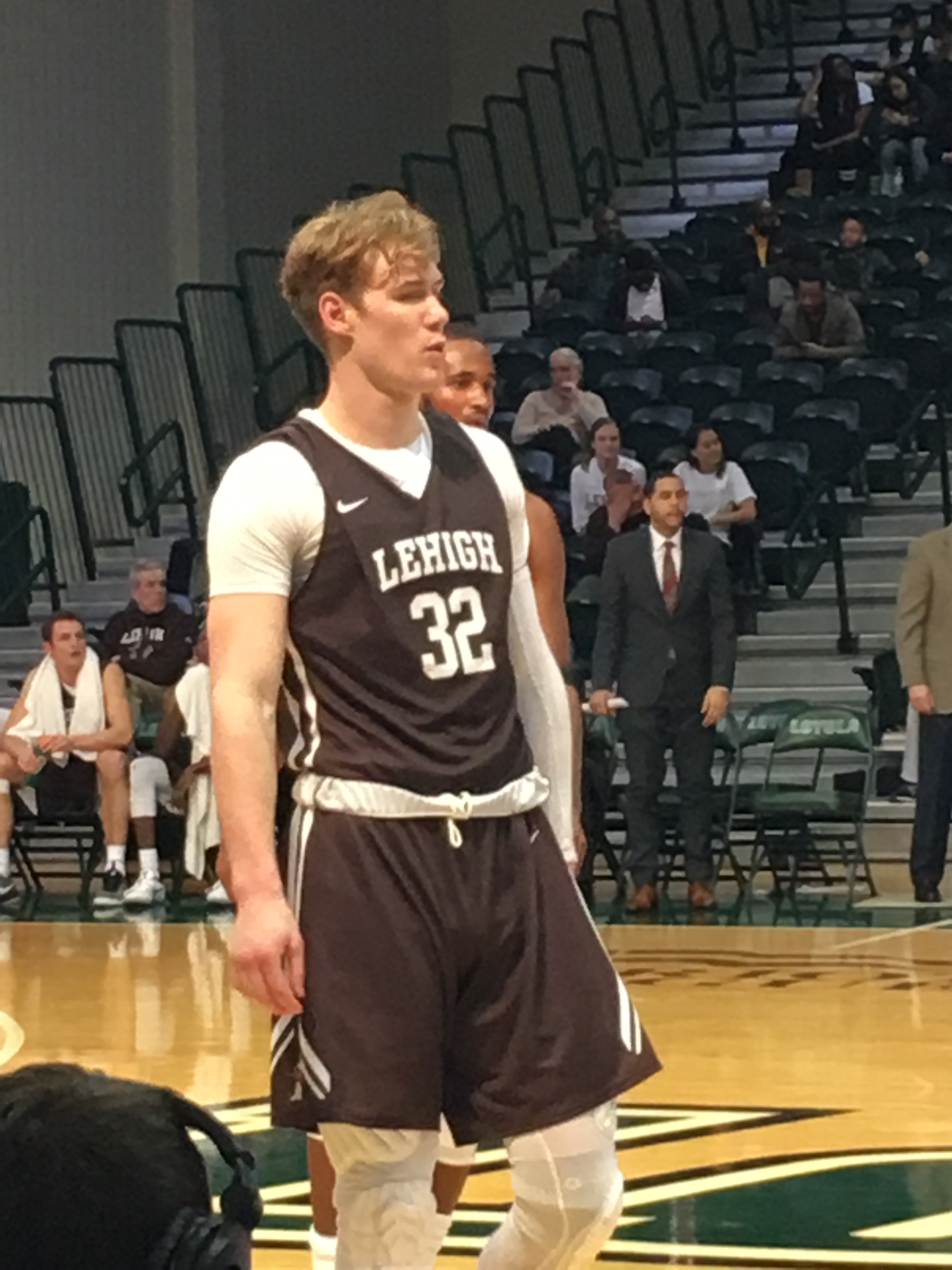
- Kempton with Lehigh in 2017

Personal information
- Born: April 28, 1995 (age 31) Scottsdale, Arizona, U.S.
- Listed height: 6 ft 10 in (2.08 m)
- Listed weight: 245 lb (111 kg)

Career information
- High school: Brophy Prep (Phoenix, Arizona)
- College: Lehigh (2013–2017)
- NBA draft: 2017: undrafted
- Playing career: 2017–2018
- Position: Center / power forward
- Number: 18, 45

Career history
- 2017: Bilbao Basket
- 2017–2018: Bnei Herzliya
- 2018: Kolossos Rodou

Career highlights
- 2× AP honorable mention All-American (2015, 2016); 2× Patriot League Player of the Year (2015, 2016); 3× First-team All-Patriot League (2015–2017); Patriot League Rookie of the Year (2014)

Timothy Vincent Kempton Jr. (born April 28, 1995) is an American former professional basketball player. He played college basketball for the Lehigh Mountain Hawks, where he was the 2015 and 2016 Patriot League Player of the Year. He is the son of retired National Basketball Association (NBA) player Tim Kempton.

== College career ==
A 6'10" center and power forward, Kempton played high school basketball at Brophy College Preparatory in Phoenix, Arizona. For college, he chose Lehigh, where as a freshman in 2013–14 he averaged 13.0 points and 7.1 rebounds per game and was named the Patriot League Rookie of the Year. In his sophomore season, Kempton raised his averages to 15.3 points and 8.7 rebounds per game and was named first-team All-Patriot League, Patriot League Player of the Year and an honorable mention All-American by the Associated Press. He repeated the honor in his junior season, averaging 17.7 points and 9.5 rebounds per game at Lehigh. Finally, in his senior season, Kempton recorded 20.4 points and 10.3 rebounds per game, joining Alec Peters that year as the only players to average at least 20 points and 10 rebounds per game. He ended his college career with a total of 2,043 points and 1,091 rebounds recorded.

== Professional career ==
=== Bilbao / Bnei Herzliya (2017–18) ===
After going undrafted in the 2017 NBA draft, Kempton joined the Milwaukee Bucks for the 2017 NBA Summer League.

On June 16, 2017, Kempton started his professional career with the Spanish team Bilbao Basket. However, on November 8, 2017, Kempton parted ways with Bilbao after appearing in eleven games. Two days later, Kempton signed with the Israeli team Bnei Herzliya for the rest of the season.

=== Kolossos Rodou (2018) ===
On July 27, 2018, Kempton signed with the Greek team Kolossos Rodou for the 2018–19 season.

== See also ==
- List of NCAA Division I men's basketball players with 2,000 points and 1,000 rebounds
