= Derrick Mercer =

American basketball player

Personal information
- Born: December 5, 1986 (age 39) Jersey City, New Jersey, U.S.
- Listed height: 5 ft 9 in (1.75 m)
- Listed weight: 180 lb (82 kg)

Career information
- High school: St. Anthony (Jersey City, New Jersey)
- College: American (2005–2009)
- NBA draft: 2009: undrafted
- Position: Point guard

Career history
- 2009: Kataja

Career highlights
- Patriot League Player of the Year (2009); First-team All-Patriot League (2009); Second-team All-Patriot League (2008); Patriot League Rookie of the Year (2006)

Derrick Mercer is an American basketball player who played point guard for American University. During the 2008–09 season, he averaged 11.5 points per game, 4.3 rebounds per game, and 1.1 steals per game. He also averaged 4.4 assists per game.

After college, he was drafted by the Harlem Globetrotters.
