= Sukhmail Mathon =

American basketball player (born 1998)

No. 41 – Balkan Botevgrad
- Position: Center / power forward
- League: NBL; EuroCup

Personal information
- Born: May 1, 1998 (age 28) Queens, New York, U.S.
- Listed height: 6 ft 10 in (2.08 m)
- Listed weight: 225 lb (102 kg)

Career information
- High school: Holderness School (Holderness, New Hampshire)
- College: Boston University (2017–2022)
- NBA draft: 2022: undrafted
- Playing career: 2022–present

Career history
- 2022: Landstede Hammers
- 2022–2023: NH Ostrava
- 2023–2024: Nymburk
- 2024–2025: M Basket Mažeikiai
- 2025: Juventus Utena
- 2025–2026: Krka
- 2026–present: Balkan Botevgrad

Career highlights
- Patriot League Player of the Year (2022); First-team All-Patriot League (2022); 2× Patriot League All-Defensive Team (2021, 2022)

Sukhmail Mathon (born May 1, 1998) is an American professional basketball player for Balkan Botevgrad of the Bulgarian National Basketball League (NBL) and the EuroCup. He previously played college basketball for the Boston University Terriers of the Patriot League, where he was the 2022 Patriot League Player of the Year.

== High school career ==
As a senior at Holderness School in Holderness, New Hampshire, Mathon scored over 1,000 points and he was a team captain. He was an unranked recruit and he committed to play college basketball at Boston University.

== College career ==
Mathon played in every game in his freshman and sophomore years. He made his first start against Northeastern. In his junior year, Mathon led the Terriers to the 2020 Patriot League tournament championship but due to the COVID-19 pandemic, the season was cancelled before the NCAA tournament. As a senior, Mathon was named to the Patriot League All-Defensive Team. As a graduate student, Mathon would have a breakout year in which he ranked top ten in the NCAA in rebounds. His efforts led to him being named the Patriot League Player of the Year and being named to the First-team All-Patriot League. Mathon's college career ended on a 46–76 loss to Middle Tennessee State in the 2022 CBI tournament.

== Professional career ==
On July 11, 2022, Mathon signed his first professional contract with Dutch club Landstede Hammers of the BNXT League.

On July 7, 2023, he signed with ERA Nymburk of the Czech National Basketball League.

On November 26, 2024, Mathon signed with M Basket Mažeikiai of the Lithuanian Basketball League (LKL). On April 14, 2025, he terminated his contract and signed with Juventus Utena to finish out the 2024–25 LKL season.

== Career statistics ==
Legend
GP	Games played	GS	Games started	MPG	Minutes per game
FG%	Field goal percentage	3P%	3-point field goal percentage	FT%	Free throw percentage
RPG	Rebounds per game	APG	Assists per game	SPG	Steals per game
BPG	Blocks per game	PPG	Points per game	**Bold**	Career high

=== College ===
Year	Team	GP	GS	MPG	FG%	3P%	FT%	RPG	APG	SPG	BPG	PPG
2017–18	Boston University	31	0	11.5	.456	0	.500	2.9	0.8	.1	.3	2.6
2018–19	Boston University	33	24	16.3	.516	.222	.333	3.6	.9	.3	.3	3.2
2019–20	Boston University	34	22	16.7	.555	.222	.591	4.7	.9	.2	.3	4.6
2020–21	Boston University	18	18	27.0	**.559**	**.250**	.774	8.2	**2.0**	.5	**1.3**	11.2
2021–22	Boston University	**35**	**35**	**30.1**	.530	.200	**.785**	**10.2**	1.5	**.6**	.7	**15.1**
Career		151	99	19.9	.530	.222	.732	5.8	1.2	.3	.5	7.1
