= Patrick King (basketball) =

German basketball player (born 1970)

Personal information
- Born: November 2, 1970 (age 56) Düsseldorf, West Germany
- Listed height: 6 ft 6 in (1.98 m)
- Listed weight: 205 lb (93 kg)

Career information
- High school: Scarsdale (Scarsdale, New York)
- College: Bucknell (1989–1992)
- NBA draft: 1992: undrafted
- Playing career: 1992–2001
- Position: Small forward

Career history
- 1992–1996: Brose Bamberg
- 1996–1998: Gießen 46ers
- 1998: Panathinaikos Limassol
- 1999–2001: Gießen 46ers

Career highlights
- Patriot League Player of the Year (1992); First-team All-Patriot League (1992); Second-team All-Patriot League (1991)

Patrick C. King (born November 2, 1970) is a German former basketball player who spent nine years playing professionally after a standout collegiate career at Bucknell University. He also represented Germany's senior national team at the 1994 FIBA World Championship and at the 1995 EuroBasket.

== College career ==
A 6'6" small forward, King was a walk-on at Bucknell who earned a scholarship after great improvement. As a freshman he played on the school's junior varsity team, and by midway through his sophomore year he earned a spot on the varsity squad. In 1990–91, his junior year, he earned a spot on the All-Patriot League Second Team. The following year, his senior season, King averaged 20.3 points per game, helped the Bison win the conference championship, and was named the Patriot League Player of the Year. In just a little over two seasons of varsity basketball King scored over 1,000 career points. King is the school- and Patriot League-record holder for field-goal percentage in a season (.670; 1990–91) and career (.638). In 2006 he was inducted into Bucknell's Athletics Hall of Fame, and in 2015 he was selected to the Patriot League Men's Basketball 25th Anniversary Team.

== Professional career ==
King went undrafted in the 1992 NBA draft after his time at Bucknell drew to a close, so he returned to Germany to compete professionally. His nine-year career spanned from 1992 to 2001, and all but one of the clubs he played for was located in his homeland. Only Panathinaikos Limassol, which is in Cyprus, was the geographical outlier.

He also represented the German national team in the 1994 FIBA World Championship and the 1995 EuroBasket. In the FIBA World Championship he averaged 1.7 points, 0.7 rebounds, and 0.2 assists, while in EuroBasket he averaged 0.7 points, 0.7 rebounds, and 0.3 assists per game.
