= Cameron Ayers =

American basketball player and coach (born 1991)

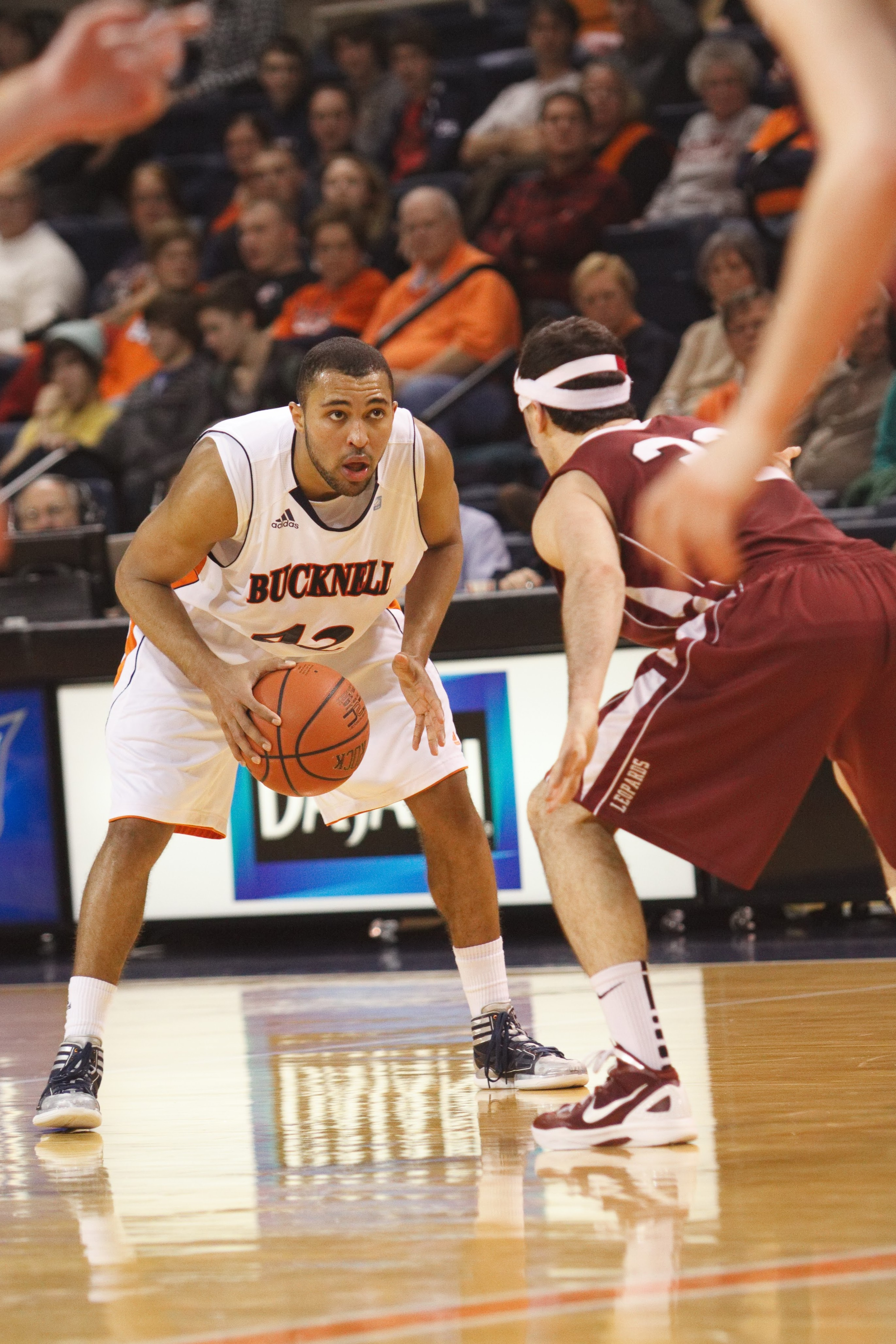
- Ayers with the Bucknell Bison in 2012

Lafayette Leopards
- Position: Assistant coach
- League: Patriot League

Personal information
- Born: September 18, 1991 (age 35) Columbus, Ohio, U.S.
- Listed height: 6 ft 5 in (1.96 m)
- Listed weight: 205 lb (93 kg)

Career information
- High school: Germantown Academy (Fort Washington, Pennsylvania)
- College: Bucknell (2010–2014)
- NBA draft: 2014: undrafted
- Playing career: 2014–2020
- Coaching career: 2020–present

Career history

Playing
- 2015: Reno Bighorns
- 2015–2016: Šiauliai
- 2016: Reno Bighorns
- 2017: Maine Red Claws
- 2017–2018: Turów Zgorzelec
- 2018–2019: Pallacanestro Trapani
- 2019–2020: Trefl Sopot

Coaching
- 2020-2021: Temple (GA)
- 2021-2022: William & Mary (DBO)
- 2022-present: Lafayette (assistant)

Career highlights
- As player: BBL champion (2016); Patriot League Player of the Year (2014); 2× First-team All-Patriot League (2013, 2014); Second-team All-Patriot League (2012); Patriot League All-Rookie Team (2011)

Cameron Alexander Ayers (born September 18, 1991) is an American basketball coach and former player, who is currently an assistant coach at Lafayette College.

== College career ==
Ayers played college basketball at Bucknell University. In his four-year career there, Ayers played 133 games (99 starts) and averaged 11.5 points, 3.2 rebounds and 1.7 assists in 30.0 minutes per game. As a senior in 2013–14, he was named the Patriot League Player of the Year.

== Professional career ==
After going undrafted on the 2014 NBA draft, Ayers joined the New Orleans Pelicans for the 2014 NBA Summer League. On September 1, 2014, he signed with Enel Brindisi of Italy for a tryout period. He parted ways with the club a month after signing with them.

On January 21, 2015, Ayers was acquired by the Reno Bighorns of the NBA Development League. On October 19, he signed with Šiauliai.

On October 31, 2016, Ayers was re-acquired by the Reno Bighorns, but was waived on November 30. In seven games he averaged 3.3 points in 15.9 minutes. On January 9, 2017, he was acquired by the Maine Red Claws and three days later, he made his debut for the Red Claws in a 110–94 loss to Raptors 905, recording three points, six rebounds and one steal in 19 minutes off the bench.

For the 2017–18 season, Ayers signed with Turów Zgorzelec of the Polish Basketball League. Ayers averaged 17.2 points per game while shooting 44% from the three-point arc. He inked with Italian club Pallacanestro Trapani on July 11, 2018.

On July 23, 2019, he signed with Trefl Sopot of PLK.

== Personal life ==
Ayers is the son of Carol and Randy Ayers. His father played college basketball at Miami University and is the former head coach of the Philadelphia 76ers and Ohio State University.

His brother, Ryan, played basketball at Notre Dame and was team captain as a senior in 2008–09.

Ayers is married to Vanderbilt University volleyball coach Lauren Plum, sister of Kelsey Plum.
