= Mike Bright (basketball) =

American basketball player

Personal information
- Listed height: 6 ft 5 in (1.96 m)

Career information
- High school: Monessen (Monessen, Pennsylvania); Fork Union Military Academy (Fork Union, Virginia)
- College: Bucknell (1989–1993)
- NBA draft: 1993: undrafted
- Position: Small forward

Career highlights
- Patriot League Player of the Year (1993); First-team All-Patriot League (1993); Second-team All-Patriot League (1991)

Michael C. Bright is an American former college basketball player. He played at Bucknell University between 1989 and 1993, where he set numerous school records and was the 1993 Patriot League Player of the Year.

== College career ==
A native of Monessen, Pennsylvania, Bright led Monessen High School to a state championship before he enrolled at Fork Union Military Academy in Fork Union, Virginia, for a postgraduate year prior to enrolling in college. Bright chose to play basketball at Bucknell, a Patriot League school in his home state. During his four seasons he scored 1,670 points (third highest in school history at the time of his graduation) and recorded 834 rebounds – just one of two Bucknell players in the 1,500-point, 800-rebound club at the time. During his sophomore season in 1990–91, Bright earned an All-Patriot League second-team honor after averaging 14.5 points and 6.6 rebounds per game. Then, during his junior and senior seasons, he was a key player that saw Bucknell win back-to-back regular season conference championships. In 1992–93, Bright's final collegiate season, he averaged 16.8 points and 7.5 rebounds per game, was a first-team All-Patriot League selection, and was named the league's player of the year. He was also the winner of the Christy Mathewson Award as the top senior-athlete at Bucknell. In 2013, Bright was inducted into Bucknell's Hall of Fame. In 2015, Bright was named to the Patriot League 25th Anniversary team. He was one of six Bucknell player to be honored.

== Professional career and later life ==
Bright went undrafted in the 1993 NBA draft. He instead competed in Hong Kong's top professional league and played for the Sea Power. He was also selected in the third round of the 1993 Continental Basketball Association draft by the Rockford Lightning. Since 2011 he has served as the President/CEO of the YMCA of Newark, New Jersey.
