= Nana Foulland =

American basketball player (born 1995)

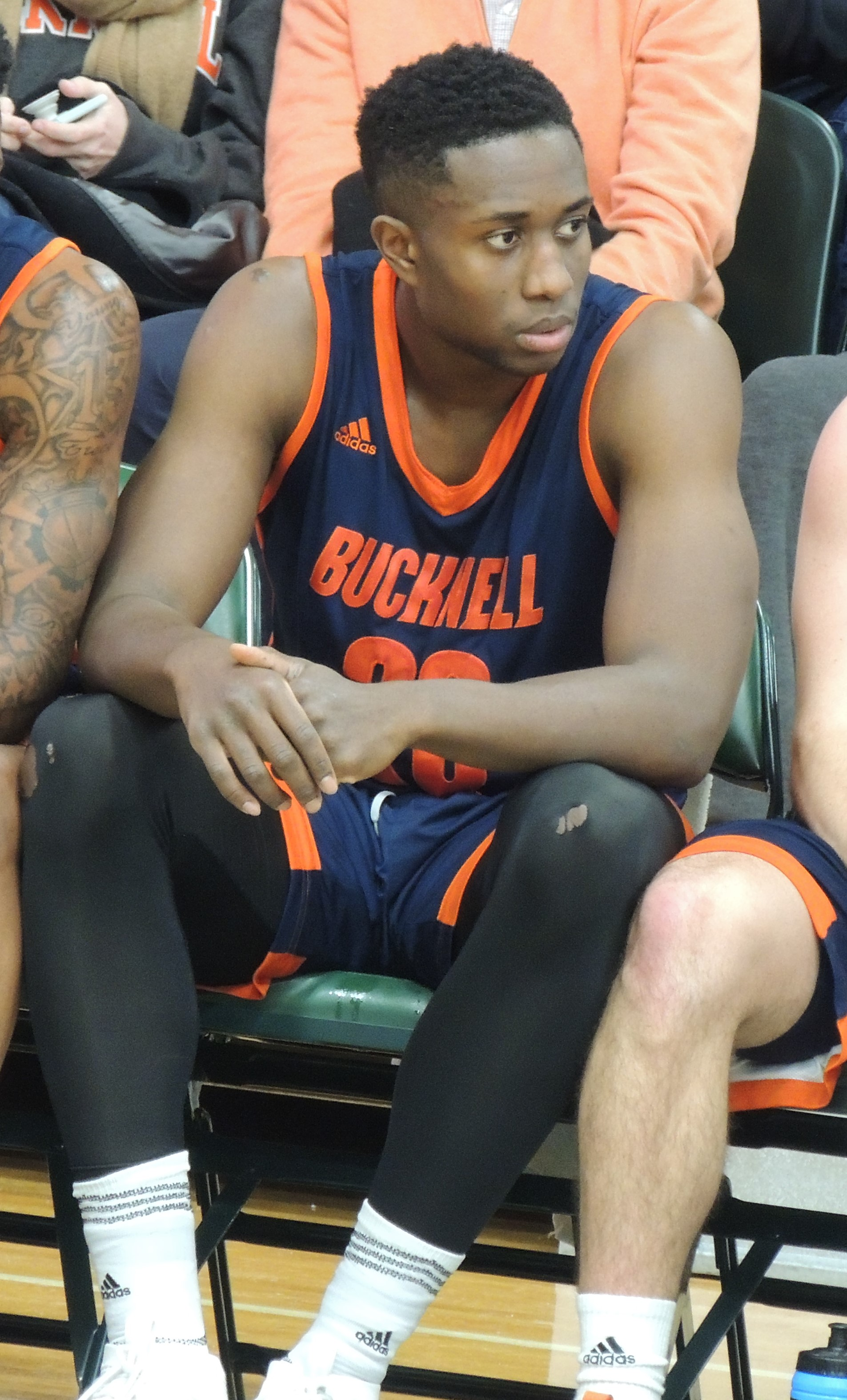
- Foulland with Bucknell in 2018

Boston Celtics
- Title: Assistant coach
- League: NBA

Personal information
- Born: October 21, 1995 (age 31) New York City, New York, U.S.
- Listed height: 6 ft 10 in (2.08 m)
- Listed weight: 235 lb (107 kg)

Career information
- High school: Berks Catholic (Reading, Pennsylvania)
- College: Bucknell (2014–2018)
- NBA draft: 2018: undrafted
- Playing career: 2018–2022
- Position: Center
- Number: 21
- Coaching career: 2022–present

Career history

Playing
- 2018–2019: Ironi Nahariya
- 2019: U-BT Cluj-Napoca
- 2019–2020: Trefl Sopot
- 2020–2021: APU Udine
- 2021–2022: Boulazac

Coaching
- 2022–2024: Oklahoma City Thunder (assistant)
- 2024–present: Boston Celtics (assistant)

Career highlights
- AP Honorable Mention All-American (2017); Patriot League Player of the Year (2017); Patriot League Defensive Player of the Year (2017); 2× First-team All-Patriot League (2017, 2018); 2× Patriot League All-Defensive team (2017, 2018); Patriot League All-Rookie Team (2015)

Nana F. Foulland (born October 21, 1995) is a former American professional basketball player who last played for Boulazac Basket Dordogne of LNB Pro B. He played college basketball for Bucknell University, where he was named Patriot League Player of the Year and Patriot Defensive Player of the Year in 2017.

== Early life and college career ==
Foulland attended Berks Catholic High School in Reading, Pennsylvania. He committed to play college basketball for the Bucknell Bison.

As a freshman at Bucknell, he was named to the Patriot League All-Rookie Team. In his sophomore season, Foulland averaged 11.8 points and 6.9 points per game and was named second-team all-Patriot League.

At the close of his junior season, Foulland was named Patriot League Player of the Year, conference Defensive Player of the Year and an honorable mention All-American by the Associated Press. Foulland led the Bison to conference regular season and tournament championships and a berth in the 2017 NCAA tournament.

Prior to the start of the 2017–18 season, Foulland was picked to repeat as Patriot League Player of the Year as Bucknell was picked to repeat as Patriot League champions. He was also named to the preseason Karl Malone Award watch list. On December 22, 2017, Foulland scored a career-high 30 points in a win over La Salle, shooting 12–15 from the floor.

Following his senior season, Foulland was again named First-Team All-Patriot League.

== Professional career ==
After going undrafted in the 2018 NBA draft, Foulland joined the Minnesota Timberwolves for the 2018 NBA Summer League.

On July 26, 2018, Foulland signed a two-year deal with Ironi Nahariya of the Israeli Premier League. In 14 games played for Nahariya, he averaged 8.1 points and 6.6 rebounds per game, shooting 59 percent from the field.

On March 1, 2019, Foulland parted ways with Nahariya to join U-BT Cluj-Napoca of the Romanian Liga Națională, signing for the rest of the season.

On August 27, 2019, he signed with Trefl Sopot of PLK. Foulland averaged 12.4 points and 8.8 rebounds per game. On August 22, 2020, he signed with Amici Pallacanestro Udinese in Italy. Foulland averaged 10.8 points, 8.9 rebounds, and 1.4 assists per game. On August 6, 2021, he signed with Boulazac Basket Dordogne of LNB Pro B.

== Coaching career ==
In summer 2022, Foulland joined Oklahoma City Thunder as video analyst.

In summer 2024, Foulland joined Boston Celtics as a player enhancement coach.
