= Bucknell Bison men's basketball =

Men's basketball team of Bucknell University

2026–27 Bucknell Bison men's basketball team
- University: Bucknell University
- Head coach: John Griffin III (4th season)
- Location: Lewisburg, Pennsylvania
- Arena: Sojka Pavilion (capacity: 4,000)
- Conference: Patriot
- Nickname: Bison
- Colors: Blue and orange

NCAA Division I tournament round of 32
- 2005, 2006

NCAA Division I tournament appearances
- 1987, 1989, 2005, 2006, 2011, 2013, 2017, 2018

Conference tournament champions
- ECC: 1987, 1989; Patriot League: 2005, 2006, 2011, 2013, 2017, 2018

Conference regular-season champions
- ECC: 1979, 1984, 1985, 1987, 1989; Patriot League: 1992, 1993, 1995, 2006, 2007, 2011, 2012, 2013, 2015, 2016, 2017, 2018, 2019, 2025

Uniforms
Home	Away

The Bucknell Bison men's basketball team represents Bucknell University in Lewisburg, Pennsylvania in NCAA Division I competition. The school's team competes in the Patriot League and plays home games in Sojka Pavilion. Former Bucknell star John Griffin III was appointed the program's 22nd head coach on March 21, 2023.

Bucknell began varsity intercollegiate competition in men's basketball in 1896. The Bison were retroactively ranked as the top team for the 1900–01 season by the Premo-Porretta Power Poll, an unofficial, mathematical ranking system of the pre-NCAA tournament era (pre-1939); the ranking is not officially recognized by the NCAA. In the tournament era, the Bison have appeared eight times in the NCAA tournament, most recently in 2018.

== Postseason ==
Bucknell has appeared in 11 postseason tournaments, with three wins in total. In 2005, Bucknell defeated #3 seed Kansas in the first round as a #14 seed, in the biggest upset of the 2005 NCAA Tournament. They received the award for "Best Upset" at the 2005 ESPY Awards. The following year, they received a #9 seed (highest in Patriot League history) and defeated the #8 seeded Arkansas in the first round.

=== NCAA tournament results ===
The Bison have appeared in eight NCAA Tournaments. Their combined record is 2–8.

Year	Seed	Round	Opponent	Result
1987	#16	First Round	#1 Georgetown	L 53–75
1989	#15	First Round	#2 Syracuse	L 81–104
2005	#14	First Round; Second Round	#3 Kansas #6 Wisconsin	W 64–63; L 62–71
2006	#9	First Round; Second Round	#8 Arkansas #1 Memphis	W 59–55; L 56–72
2011	#14	First Round	#3 UConn	L 52–81
2013	#11	First Round	#6 Butler	L 56–68
2017	#13	First Round	#4 West Virginia	L 80–86
2018	#14	First Round	#3 Michigan State	L 78–82

From 2011–2015 the round of 64 was known as the Second Round

=== NIT results ===
The Bison have appeared in the National Invitation Tournament (NIT) three times. Their record is 1–3.

Year	Round	Opponent	Result
2012	First Round; Second Round	Arizona; Nevada	W 65–54; L 67–75
2015	First Round	Temple	L 67–73
2016	First Round	Monmouth	L 80–90

== Award winners ==
=== Conference Player of the Year ===
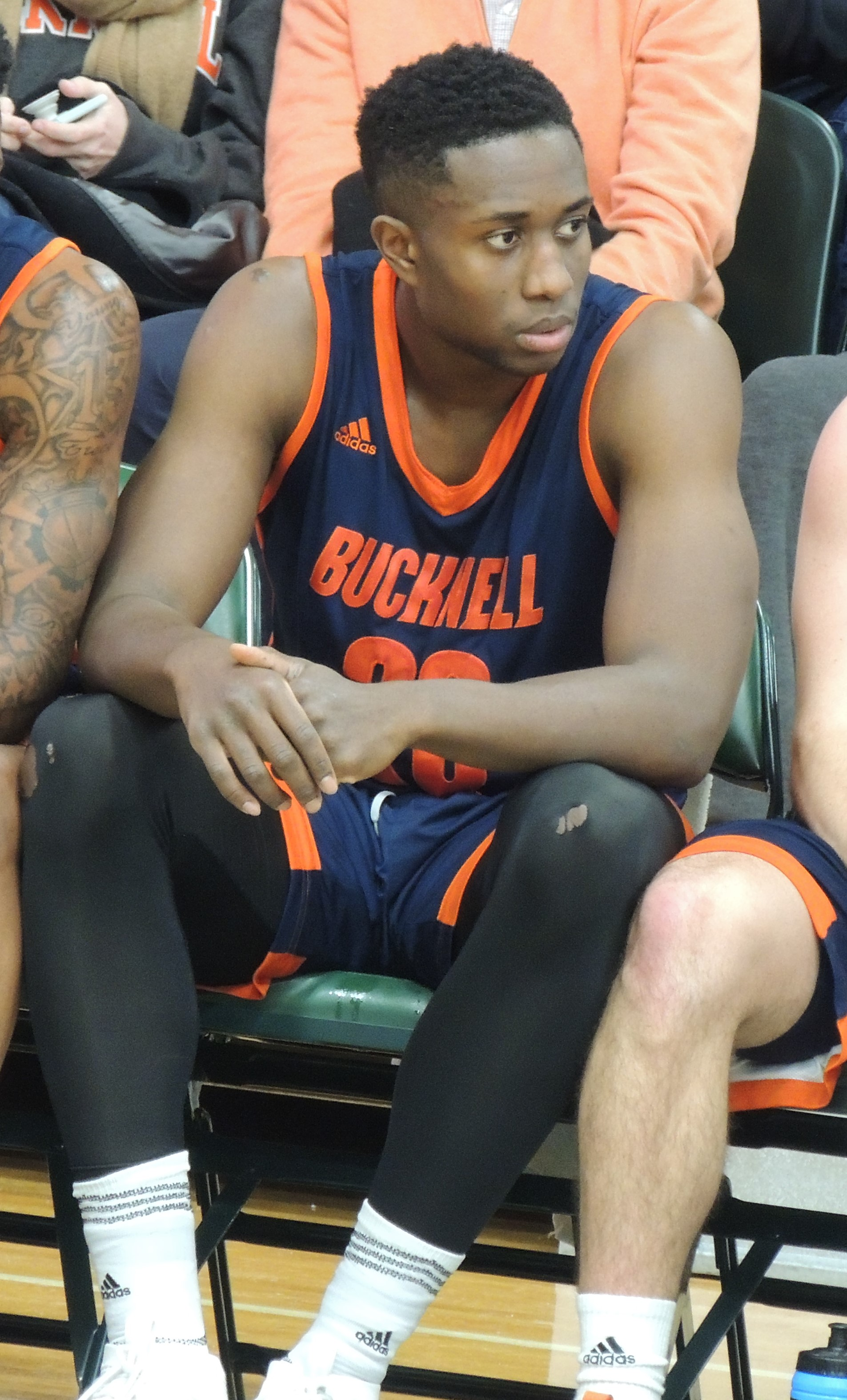
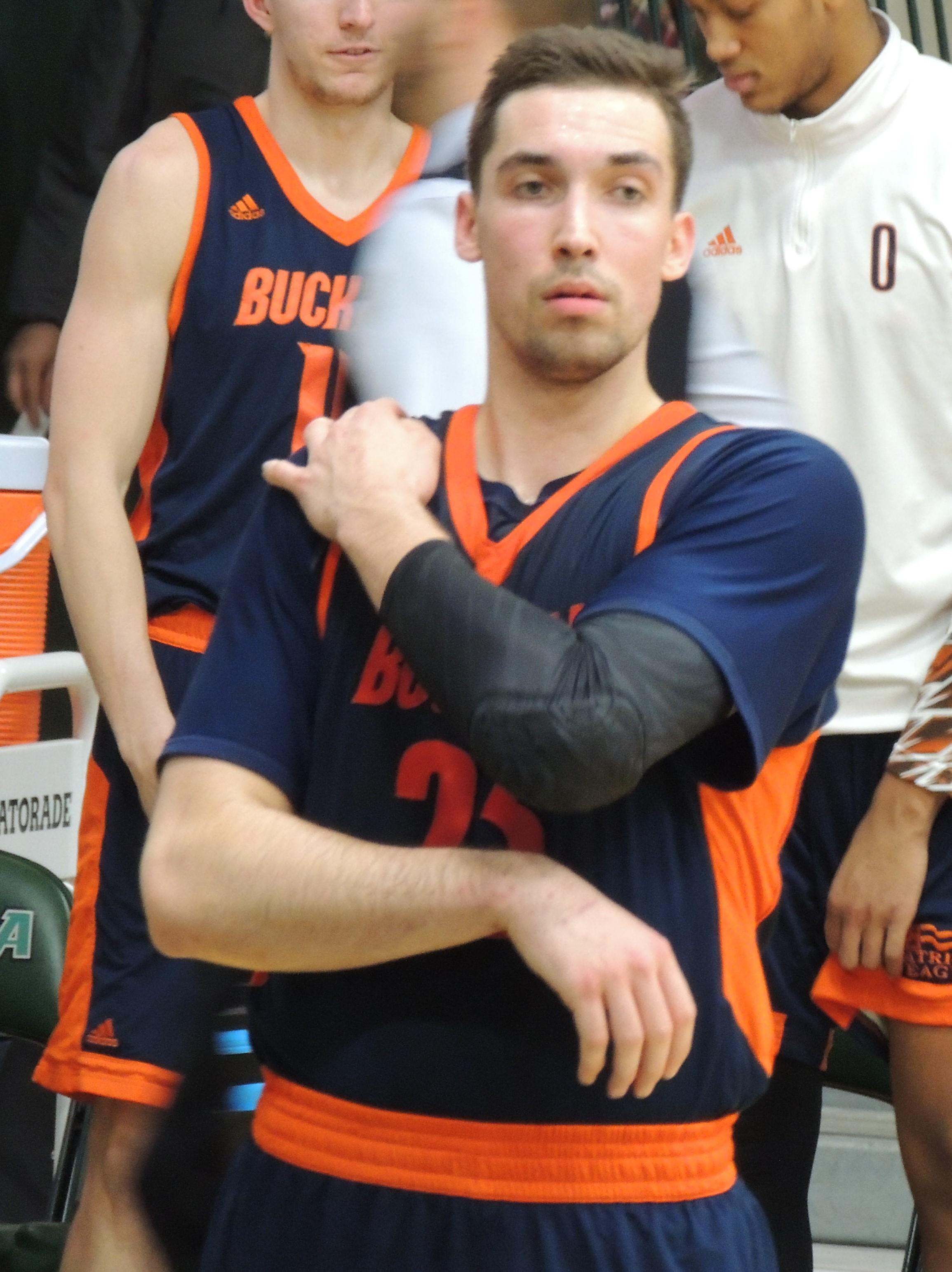
Nana Foulland (left) and Zach Thomas (right) won back-to-back Patriot League Player of the Year awards as teammates in 2017 and 2018.

Year	Player	Conference
1985	Jaye Andrews	East Coast Conference
1992	Patrick King	Patriot League
1993	Mike Bright	Patriot League
2006	Charles Lee	Patriot League
2011	Mike Muscala	Patriot League
2013	Mike Muscala (2)	Patriot League
2014	Cameron Ayers	Patriot League
2017	Nana Foulland	Patriot League
2018	Zach Thomas	Patriot League
2025	Noah Williamson	Patriot League

=== Conference Coach of the Year ===
Year	Player	Conference
1984	Charlie Woollum	East Coast Conference
1985	Charlie Woollum (2)	East Coast Conference
1987	Charlie Woollum (3)	East Coast Conference
1993	Charlie Woollum (4)	Patriot League
1995	Pat Flannery	Patriot League
1997	Pat Flannery (2)	Patriot League
2006	Pat Flannery (3)	Patriot League
2011	Dave Paulsen	Patriot League
2012	Dave Paulsen (2)	Patriot League
2016	Nathan Davis	Patriot League
2017	Nathan Davis (2)	Patriot League
2025	John Griffin III	Patriot League

== Retired numbers ==
The Bison have retired three jersey numbers in program history.

No.	Player	Years
22	Al Leslie	1977–1981
31	Mike Muscala	2009–2013
44	Hal Danzig	1956–1959

== NBA draft ==
Bucknell has had three players drafted into the National Basketball Association (NBA). Mike Muscala is the only current active Bison playing in the NBA.

Player	Draft	Round	Pick	Team	Notes
Al Leslie	1981	2	37	Indiana Pacers	Highest drafted in program history
Jaye Andrews	1985	7	169	Philadelphia 76ers	—
Mike Muscala	2013	2	44	Atlanta Hawks	Only Bison to play in the NBA

== Bisons in international leagues ==
- Bryan Cohen (born 1989), American-Israeli basketball player
- John Meeks (born 1999), basketball player in the Israeli Basketball Premier League
- Nate Sestina (born 1997), basketball player in the Israeli Basketball Premier League
