= American Eagles men's basketball statistical leaders =

The American Eagles men's basketball statistical leaders are individual statistical leaders of the American Eagles men's basketball program in various categories, including points, rebounds, assists, steals, and blocks. Within those areas, the lists identify single-game, single-season, and career leaders. The Eagles represent American University in the NCAA's Patriot League.

American began competing in intercollegiate basketball in 1926. However, the school's record book does not generally list records from before the 1950s, as records from before this period are often incomplete and inconsistent. Since scoring was much lower in this era, and teams played much fewer games during a typical season, it is likely that few or no players from this era would appear on these lists anyway.

The NCAA did not officially record assists as a stat until the 1983–84 season, and blocks and steals until the 1985–86 season, but American's record books includes players in these stats before these seasons. These lists are updated through the end of the 2019–20 season.

== Scoring ==
Career
| Rk | Player | Points | Seasons |
|---|---|---|---|
| 1 | Sa'eed Nelson | 2,116 | 2016–17 2017–18 2018–19 2019–20 |
| 2 | Russell Bowers | 2,056 | 1977–78 1978–79 1979–80 1980–81 |
| 3 | Brian Gilgeous | 2,013 | 1989–90 1990–91 1991–92 1992–93 |
| 4 | Willie Jones | 1,982 | 1957–58 1958–59 1959–60 |
| 5 | Frank Ross | 1,921 | 1983–84 1984–85 1985–86 1986–87 |
| 6 | Matt Rogers | 1,856 | 2020–21 2021–22 2022–23 2023–24 2024–25 |
| 7 | Andre Ingram | 1,655 | 2003–04 2004–05 2005–06 2006–07 |
| 8 | Frank Weiss | 1,632 | 1955–56 1956–57 1957–58 |
| 9 | Wilbur Thomas | 1,543 | 1972–73 1973–74 1974–75 |
| 10 | Mark Nickens | 1,515 | 1980–81 1981–82 1982–83 |

Season
| Rk | Player | Points | Season |
|---|---|---|---|
| 1 | Russell Bowers | 726 | 1979–80 |
| 2 | Willie Jones | 694 | 1958–59 |
| 3 | Frank Ross | 683 | 1986–87 |
| 4 | Frank Ross | 645 | 1985–86 |
| 5 | Brian Gilgeous | 636 | 1992–93 |
| 6 | Willie Jones | 626 | 1959–60 |
| 7 | Vlad Moldoveanu | 613 | 2010–11 |
| 8 | Garrison Carr | 606 | 2007–08 |
| 9 | Russell Bowers | 599 | 1978–79 |
| 10 | Sa'eed Nelson | 595 | 2018–19 |

Single game
| Rk | Player | Points | Season | Opponent |
|---|---|---|---|---|
| 1 | Willie Jones | 54 | 1959–60 | Evansville |
| 2 | Russell Bowers | 45 | 1980–81 | Harvard |
| 3 | Willie Jones | 44 | 1958–59 | Roanoke |
| 4 | Sa'eed Nelson | 41 | 2017–18 | Lafayette |
| | Willie Jones | 41 | 1958–59 | Fairleigh Dickinson |
| 6 | Brian Gilgeous | 40 | 1992–93 | Mount St. Mary’s |
| | Kermit Washington | 40 | 1972–73 | Georgetown |
| 8 | Vlad Moldoveanu | 39 | 2010–11 | Lehigh |
| | Craig Sedmak | 39 | 1992–93 | Richmond |
| | Frank Ross | 39 | 1986–87 | Dartmouth |
| | Russell Bowers | 39 | 1979–80 | La Salle |
| | Willie Jones | 39 | 1958–59 | Ball State |
| | Willie Jones | 39 | 1957–58 | Roanoke |
| | Ronnie Garshag | 39 | 1948–49 | Bucknell |

== Rebounds ==
Career
| Rk | Player | Rebounds | Seasons |
|---|---|---|---|
| 1 | Kermit Washington | 1,478 | 1970–71 1971–72 1972–73 |
| 2 | Richard Wells | 1,184 | 1956–57 1957–58 1958–59 1959–60 |
| 3 | Art Beatty | 1,126 | 1965–66 1966–67 1967–68 |
| 4 | Bill Beauchamp | 1,057 | 1958–59 1959–60 1960–61 1961–62 |
| 5 | Alton Dillard | 1,037 | 1960–61 1961–62 1962–63 1963–64 |
| 6 | Gordon Stiles | 973 | 1967–68 1968–69 1969–70 |
| 7 | Stephen Lumpkins | 884 | 2008–09 2009–10 2010–11 2012–13 |
| 8 | Wilbur Thomas | 803 | 1972–73 1973–74 1974–75 |
| 9 | Matt Rogers | 760 | 2020–21 2021–22 2022–23 2023–24 2024–25 |
| 10 | Craig Sedmak | 729 | 1989–90 1990–91 1991–92 1992–93 |

Season
| Rk | Player | Rebounds | Season |
|---|---|---|---|
| 1 | Kermit Washington | 512 | 1970–71 |
| 2 | Kermit Washington | 511 | 1972–73 |
| 3 | Art Beatty | 458 | 1966–67 |
| 4 | Kermit Washington | 455 | 1971–72 |
| 5 | Alton Dillard | 443 | 1960–61 |
| 6 | Richard Wells | 433 | 1957–58 |
| 7 | Bill Beauchamp | 431 | 1958–59 |
| 8 | Richard Wells | 412 | 1959–60 |
| 9 | Art Beatty | 390 | 1967–68 |
| 10 | Alton Dillard | 387 | 1961–62 |

Single game
| Rk | Player | Rebounds | Season | Opponent |
|---|---|---|---|---|
| 1 | Kermit Washington | 34 | 1970–71 | Georgetown |
| 2 | Kermit Washington | 33 | 1972–73 | Loyola (Md.) |
| | Art Beatty | 33 | 1966–67 | La Salle |
| 4 | Ben Still | 32 | 1964–65 | Fairleigh Dickinson |
| 5 | Kermit Washington | 31 | 1972–73 | LaSalle |
| 6 | Kermit Washington | 30 | 1971–72 | West Chester |
| | Kermit Washington | 30 | 1970–71 | Loyola (Md.) |
| | Alton Dillard | 30 | 1961–62 | Baltimore |
| | Alton Dillard | 30 | 1961–62 | Georgetown |
| 10 | Art Beatty | 29 | 1966–67 | St. Peter’s |
| | Art Beatty | 29 | 1966–67 | Susquehanna |

== Assists ==
Career
| Rk | Player | Assists | Seasons |
|---|---|---|---|
| 1 | Gordon Austin | 691 | 1979–80 1980–81 1981–82 1982–83 |
| 2 | Derrick Mercer | 524 | 2005–06 2006–07 2007–08 2008–09 |
| 3 | Sa'eed Nelson | 521 | 2016–17 2017–18 2018–19 2019–20 |
| 4 | Mike Sampson | 505 | 1984–85 1985–86 1986–87 1987–88 |
| 5 | Elijah Stephens | 469 | 2021–22 2022–23 2023–24 2024–25 |
| 6 | Andres Rodriguez | 465 | 2001–02 2002–03 2003–04 |
| 7 | Darryl Franklin | 454 | 1992–93 1993–94 1994–95 1995–96 |
| 8 | Frank Ross | 350 | 1983–84 1984–85 1985–86 1986–87 |
| 9 | Brian Gilgeous | 313 | 1989–90 1990–91 1991–92 1992–93 |
| 10 | Duane Gilliam | 299 | 1992–93 1993–94 1994–95 1995–96 |

Season
| Rk | Player | Assists | Season |
|---|---|---|---|
| 1 | Gordon Austin | 247 | 1982–83 |
| 2 | Andres Rodriguez | 225 | 2003–04 |
| 3 | Gordon Austin | 195 | 1981–82 |
| 4 | Mike Sampson | 184 | 1984–85 |
| 5 | Mark Garlitos | 165 | 1978–79 |
| | Gordon Austin | 165 | 1980–81 |
| 7 | Sa'eed Nelson | 155 | 2018–19 |
| 8 | Don Slappy | 150 | 1976–77 |
| 9 | Sa'eed Nelson | 147 | 2017–18 |
| 10 | Darryl Franklin | 146 | 1994–95 |

Single game
| Rk | Player | Assists | Season | Opponent |
|---|---|---|---|---|
| 1 | Andres Rodriguez | 19 | 2003–04 | Navy |
| 2 | Herb Jamison | 15 | 1975–76 | Temple |
| 3 | Gordon Austin | 14 | 1982–83 | Wagner |
| | Gordon Austin | 14 | 1982–83 | Towson |
| | Mark Garlitos | 14 | 1978–79 | St. Mary’s (Md.) |
| 6 | Andres Rodriguez | 13 | 2003–04 | Lafayette |
| | Andres Rodriguez | 13 | 2003–04 | ETSU |
| | Mike Sampson | 13 | 1984–85 | William & Mary |
| | Gordon Austin | 13 | 1981–82 | Drexel |
| 10 | Sa'eed Nelson | 12 | 2018–19 | Saint Francis (Pa.) |
| | Derrick Mercer | 12 | 2008–09 | Bucknell |
| | Gordon Austin | 12 | 1982–83 | Santa Clara |
| | Gordon Austin | 12 | 1982–83 | UNC-Charlotte |
| | Gordon Austin | 12 | 1981–82 | South Alabama |

== Steals ==
Career
| Rk | Player | Steals | Seasons |
|---|---|---|---|
| 1 | Jarion Childs | 295 | 1996–97 1997–98 1998–99 1999–00 |
| 2 | Sa'eed Nelson | 277 | 2016–17 2017–18 2018–19 2019–20 |
| 3 | Gordon Austin | 235 | 1979–80 1980–81 1981–82 1982–83 |
| 4 | Mark Nickens | 231 | 1980–81 1981–82 1982–83 |
| 5 | Frank Ross | 203 | 1983–84 1984–85 1985–86 1986–87 |
| 6 | Darryl Franklin | 184 | 1992–93 1993–94 1994–95 1995–96 |
| | Elijah Stephens | 184 | 2021–22 2022–23 2023–24 2024–25 |
| 8 | Mike Sampson | 183 | 1984–85 1985–86 1986–87 1987–88 |
| 9 | Brian Gilgeous | 177 | 1989–90 1990–91 1991–92 1992–93 |
| 10 | Ed Sloane | 175 | 1979–80 1980–81 1981–82 1982–83 |

Season
| Rk | Player | Steals | Season |
|---|---|---|---|
| 1 | Jarion Childs | 95 | 1999–00 |
| 2 | Gordon Austin | 91 | 1981–82 |
| 3 | Mark Nickens | 87 | 1982–83 |
| 4 | Andres Rodriguez | 82 | 2003–04 |
| | Sa'eed Nelson | 82 | 2019–20 |
| 6 | Mark Nickens | 75 | 1981–82 |
| 7 | Jarion Childs | 73 | 1997–98 |
| 8 | Sa'eed Nelson | 72 | 2016–17 |
| 9 | Sa'eed Nelson | 71 | 2018–19 |
| 10 | Jarion Childs | 70 | 1998–99 |

Single game
| Rk | Player | Steals | Season | Opponent |
|---|---|---|---|---|
| 1 | Linas Lekavicius | 9 | 2003–04 | Bucknell |
| 2 | Sa'eed Nelson | 8 | 2019–20 | UMBC |
| | Sa'eed Nelson | 8 | 2019–20 | Boston U |
| | Jarion Childs | 8 | 1997–98 | James Madison |
| | Mark Nickens | 8 | 1980–81 | Harvard |
| 6 | Glenn Stokes | 7 | 2001–02 | Wagner |
| | Jarion Childs | 7 | 1999–00 | Wagner |
| | Jarion Childs | 7 | 1999–00 | Loyola (Md.) |
| | Jarion Childs | 7 | 1999–00 | Catholic |
| | Jarion Childs | 7 | 1998–99 | VCU |
| | Darryl Franklin | 7 | 1995–96 | East Carolina |
| | Mark Nickens | 7 | 1981–82 | La Salle |

== Blocks ==
Career
| Rk | Player | Blocks | Seasons |
|---|---|---|---|
| 1 | Tony Wroblicky | 151 | 2010–11 2011–12 2012–13 2013–14 |
| 2 | Stephen Lumpkins | 138 | 2008–09 2009–10 2010–11 2012–13 |
| 3 | Saliou-Binet Telly | 126 | 1997–98 1998–99 1999–00 2000–01 |
| 4 | Juan Jones | 112 | 1980–81 1981–82 1982–83 |
| 5 | Jordan Nichols | 108 | 2005–06 2006–07 2007–08 2008–09 |
| 6 | Stacy Beckton | 101 | 2017–18 2018–19 2019–20 2020–21 2021–22 |
| 7 | Keith Gray | 97 | 1998–99 1999–00 2000–01 2001–02 |
| 8 | Johnny O'Neil | 96 | 2020–21 2021–22 2022–23 |
| 9 | Craig Sedmak | 93 | 1989–90 1990–91 1991–92 1992–93 |
| 10 | Patrick Doctor | 91 | 1998–99 1999–00 2000–01 2001–02 |

Season
| Rk | Player | Blocks | Season |
|---|---|---|---|
| 1 | Sean Stevens | 61 | 1990–91 |
| 2 | Tony Wroblicky | 61 | 2013–14 |
| 3 | Tony Wroblicky | 52 | 2011–12 |
| 4 | Johnny O'Neil | 51 | 2022–23 |
| 5 | Stephen Lumpkins | 48 | 2009–10 |
| 6 | Saliou-Binet Telly | 44 | 1997–98 |
| 7 | Juan Jones | 42 | 1982–83 |
| 8 | Juan Jones | 40 | 1980–81 |
| 9 | Stephen Lumpkins | 39 | 2010–11 |
| 10 | Craig Sedmak | 38 | 1991–92 |

Single game
| Rk | Player | Steals | Season | Opponent |
|---|---|---|---|---|
| 1 | Kermit Washington | 10 | 1970–71 | Georgetown |
| 2 | Kermit Washington | 8 | 1971–72 | Navy |
| | Kermit Washington | 8 | 1971–72 | Syracuse |
| | Kermit Washington | 8 | 1971–72 | Loyola (Md.) |
| 5 | Tony Wroblicky | 7 | 2011–12 | Florida Atlantic |
| | Saliou-Binet Telly | 6 | 1997–98 | James Madison |
| 7 | Jordan Nichols | 6 | 2005–06 | Holy Cross |
| | Keith Gray | 6 | 1999–00 | James Madison |
| | Sean Stevens | 6 | 1990–91 | William & Mary |
| | Sean Stevens | 6 | 1990–91 | Loyola (Md.) |
| | Tony Wroblicky | 6 | 2013–14 | Bucknell |
