= Coastal Athletic Association Men's Basketball Player of the Year =

Men's college basketball award

CAA Men's Basketball Player of the Year
- Awarded for: the most outstanding basketball player in the Coastal Athletic Association
- Country: United States

History
- First award: 1983
- Most recent: Cruz Davis, Hofstra

The Coastal Athletic Association Men's Basketball Player of the Year (formerly the Colonial Athletic Association Men's Basketball Player of the Year) is an award given to the Coastal Athletic Association's most outstanding player. The award was first given following the 1982–83 season, when the conference was known as the ECAC South basketball league. In 1985, the conference expanded to offer more sports, and became the Colonial Athletic Association. The conference name was changed to Coastal Athletic Association in 2023.

The first award, the only tie, was given to Dan Ruland of James Madison and Carlos Yates of George Mason. Two players have won the award three times: David Robinson of Navy (1984–1986) and George Evans of George Mason (1999–2001). Evans' first award in 1999 was as a 28-year-old sophomore—he had served seven years in the United States Army, seeing combat in Somalia, Bosnia, and Desert Storm. Eight other players have been the CAA POY twice, with Hofstra's Aaron Estrada being the most recent (2022, 2023).

Hofstra has the most all-time awards with ten and most individual recipients with seven. Since July 2022, it is the only one of the five schools with the most awards to still be in the conference. George Mason (six winners) left for the Atlantic 10 in 2013. James Madison, Old Dominion and VCU have each had four winners; James Madison left for the Sun Belt Conference in 2022, Old Dominion left for Conference USA in 2013, and VCU left for the A-10 in 2012. Navy's three wins by Robinson were won while the team was a conference member for just nine years. Another charter member, Richmond, won three awards before leaving the conference in 2001. Other original members to leave, American and East Carolina, each have one recipient. Of the conference's current members, William & Mary went the longest without its first winner. In 2015, 32 years after the award was first handed out, Marcus Thornton claimed William & Mary's first ever honor.

== Key ==
†	Co-Players of the Year
*	Awarded a national player of the year award that same season: UPI College Basketball Player of the Year (1954–55 to 1995–96); Oscar Robertson Trophy (1958–59 to present); Naismith College Player of the Year (1968–69 to present); John R. Wooden Award (1976–77 to present)
Player (X)	Denotes the number of times the player has been awarded the CAA Player of the Year award at that point

== Winners ==
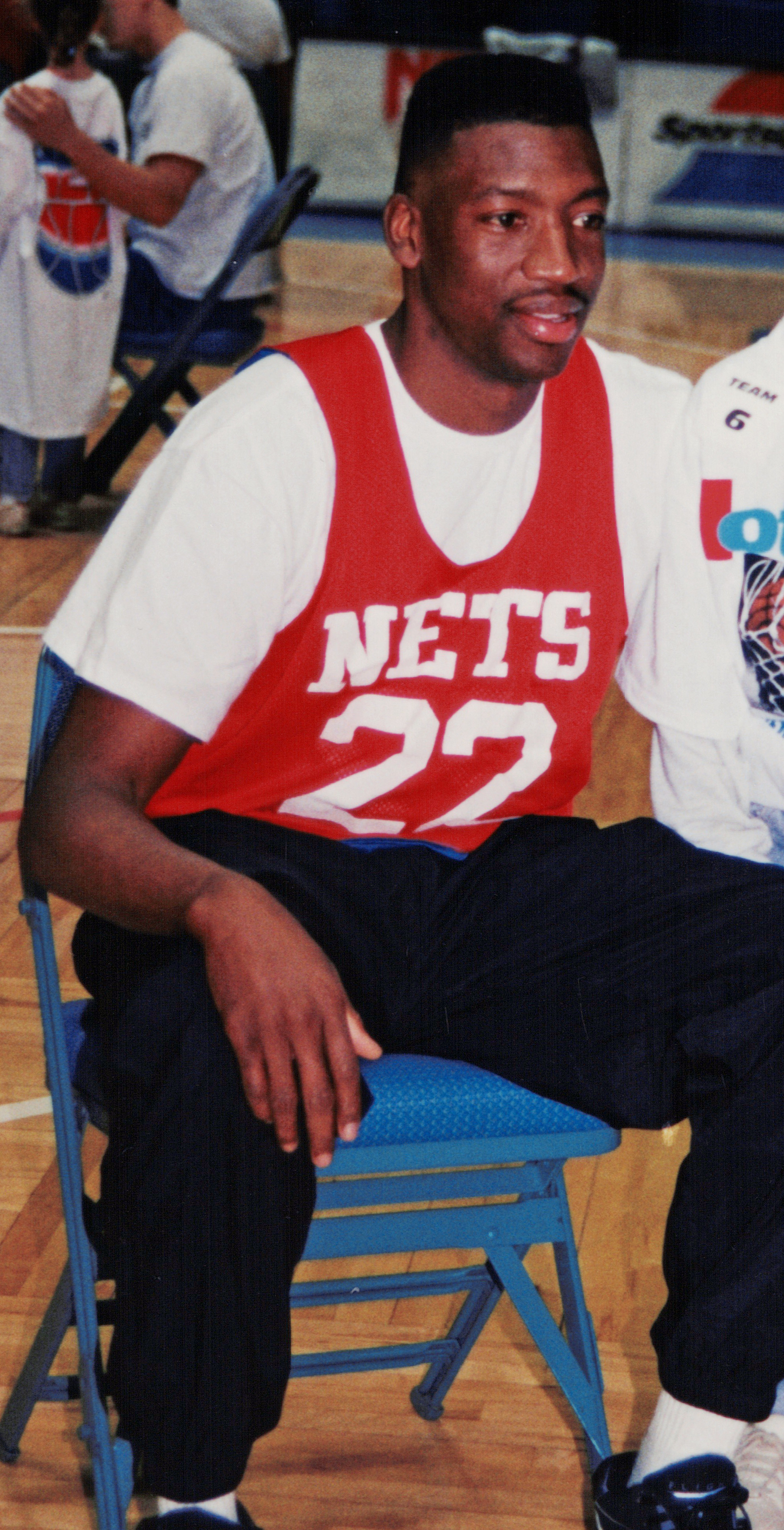
Johnny Newman, Richmond, 1984

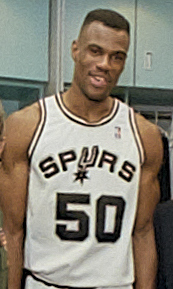
David Robinson, Navy, 1985 through 1987

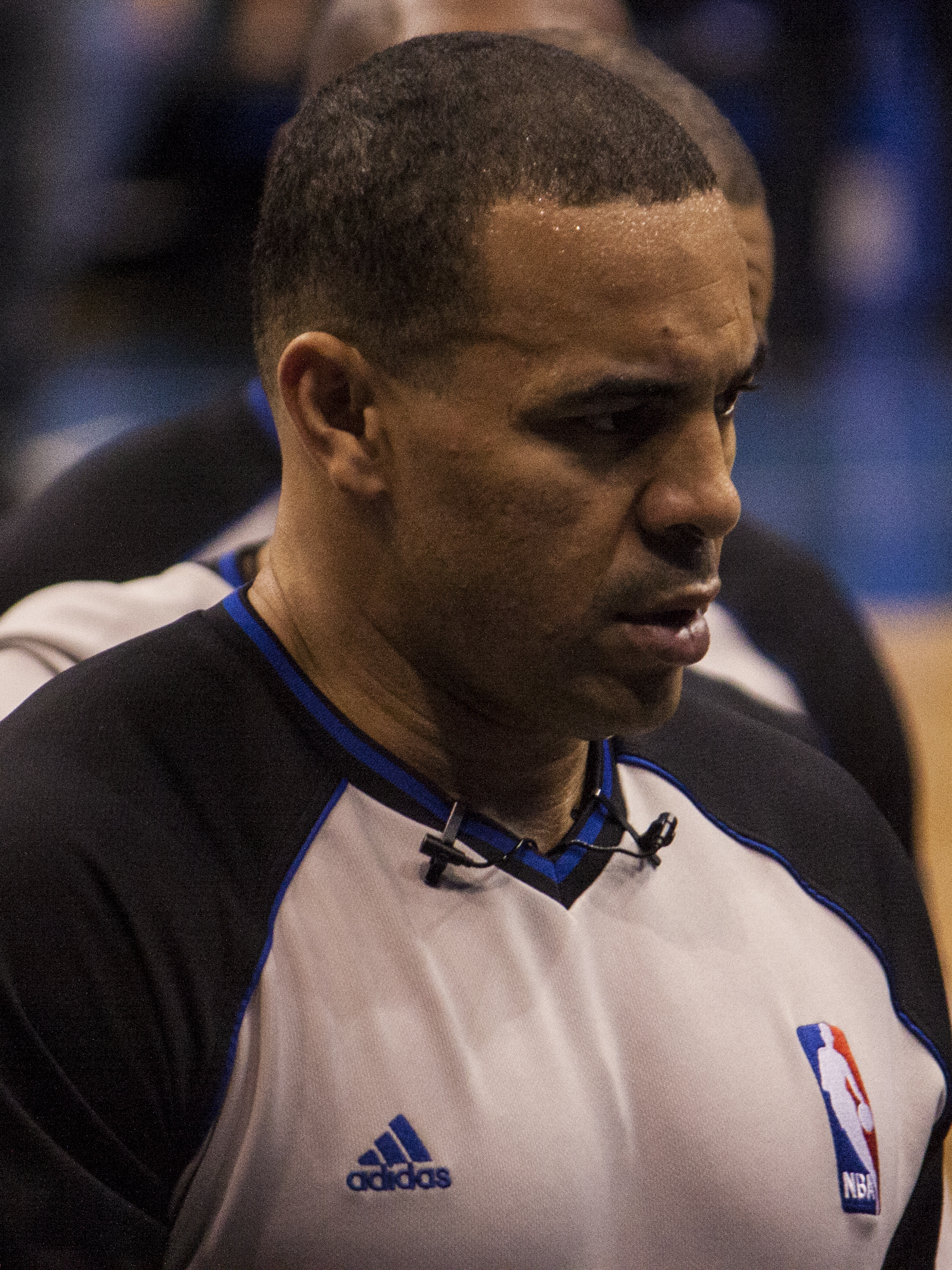
Curtis Blair, Richmond, 1992

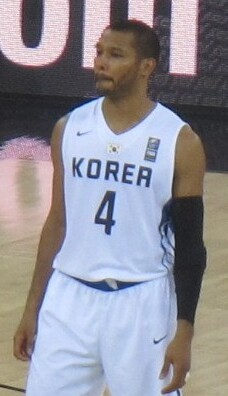
Jarod Stevenson, Richmond, 1998

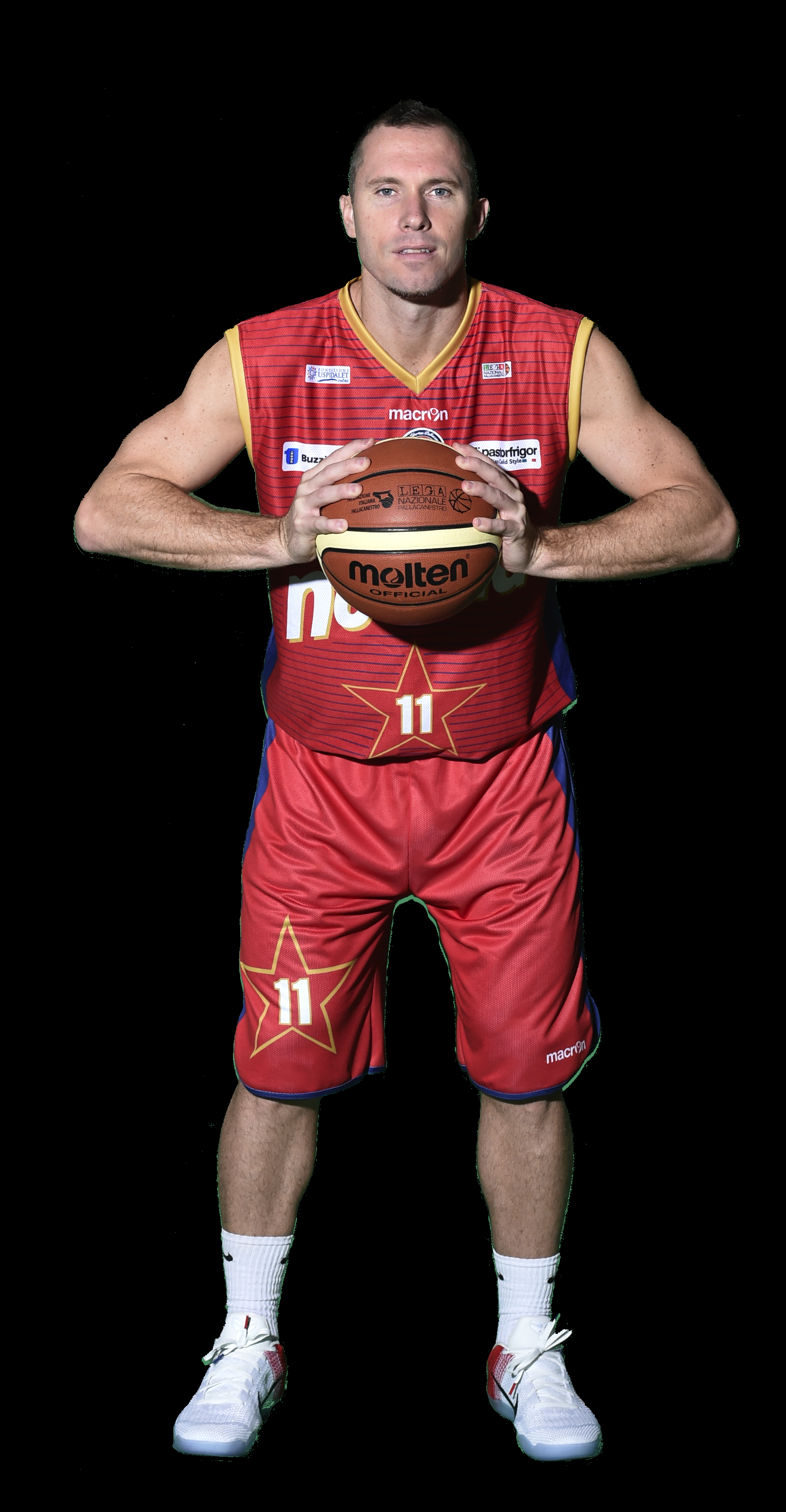
Brett Blizzard, UNC Wilmington, 2002 and 2003

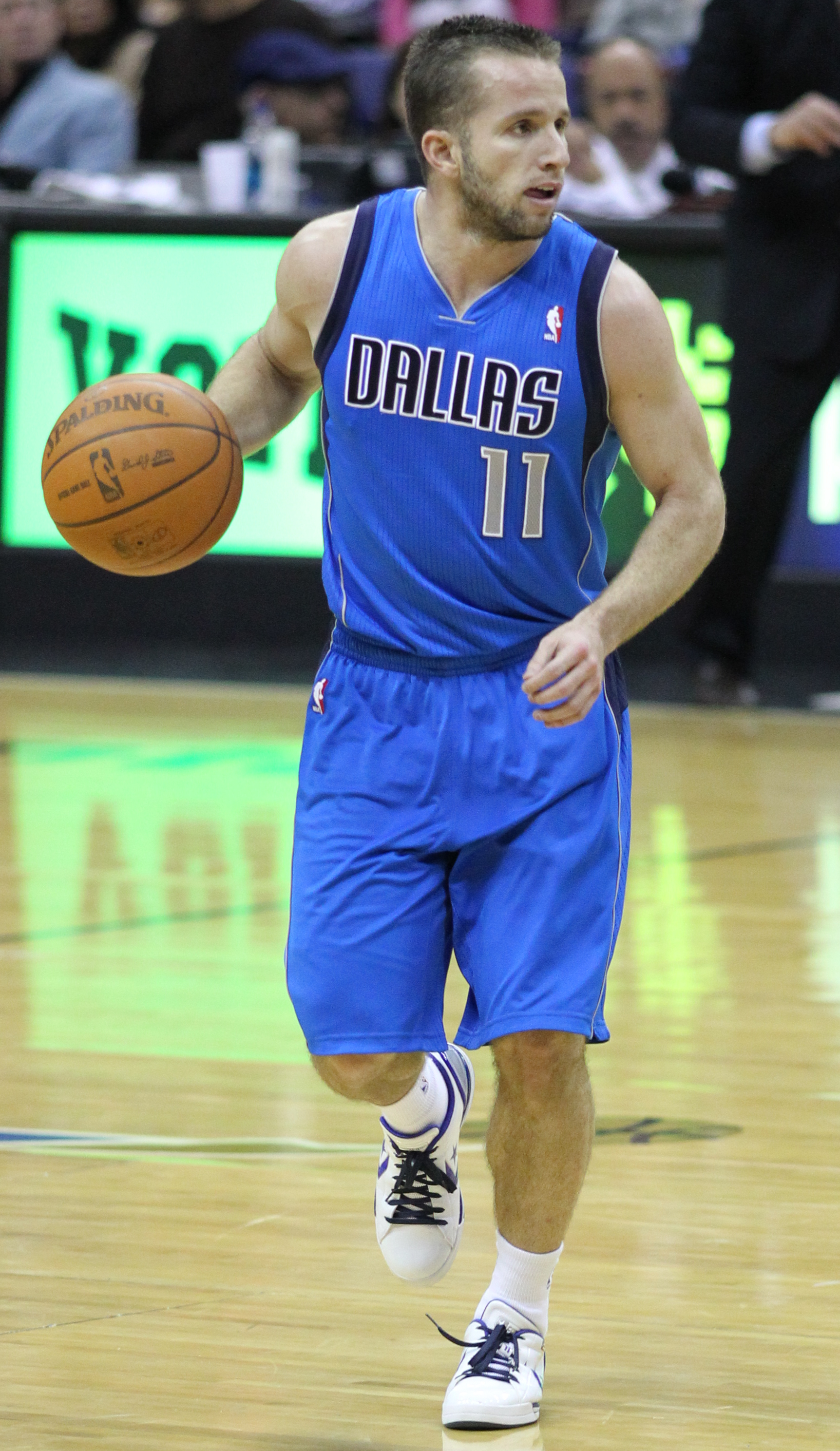
J. J. Barea, Northeastern, 2006

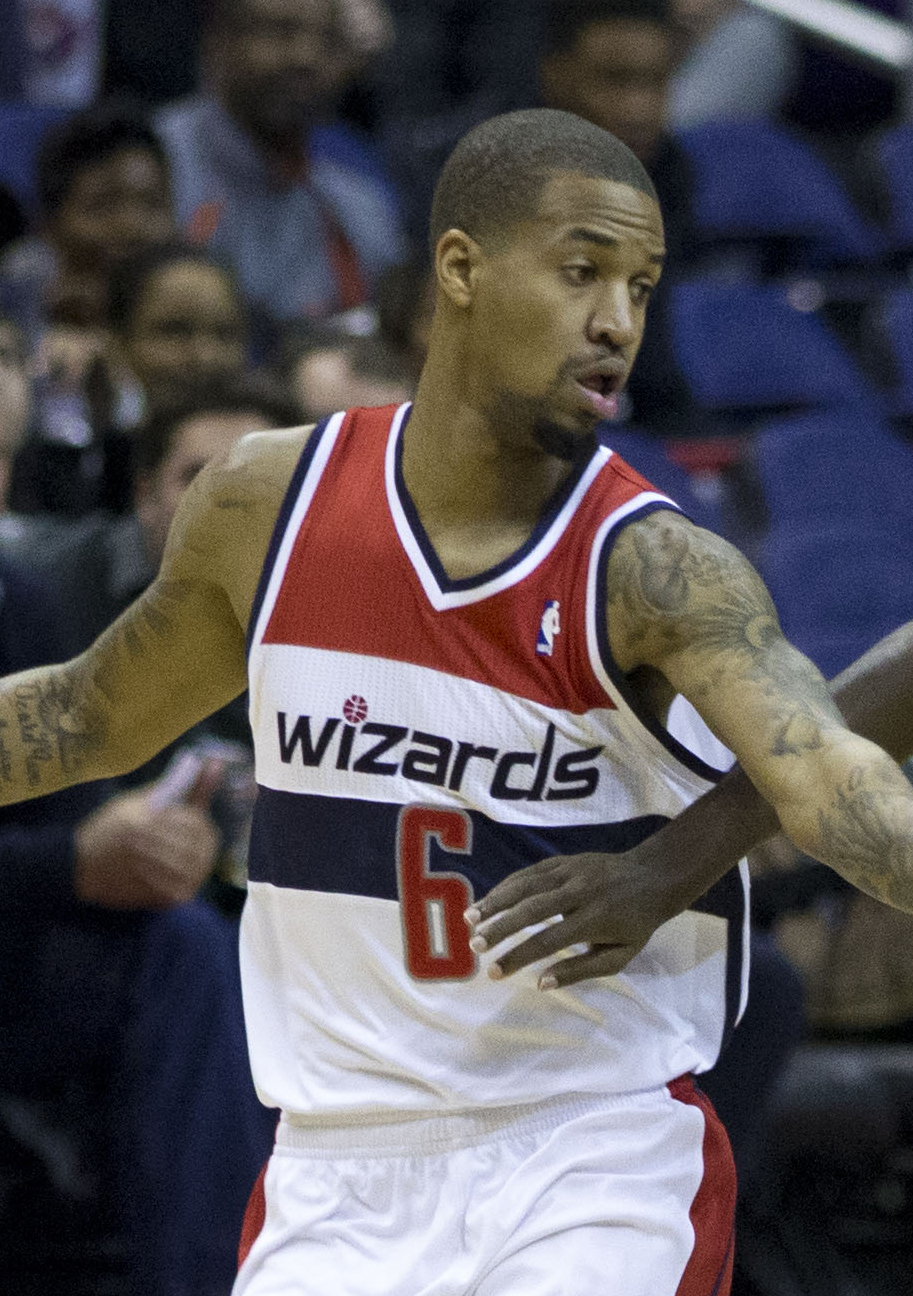
Eric Maynor, VCU, 2008 and 2009

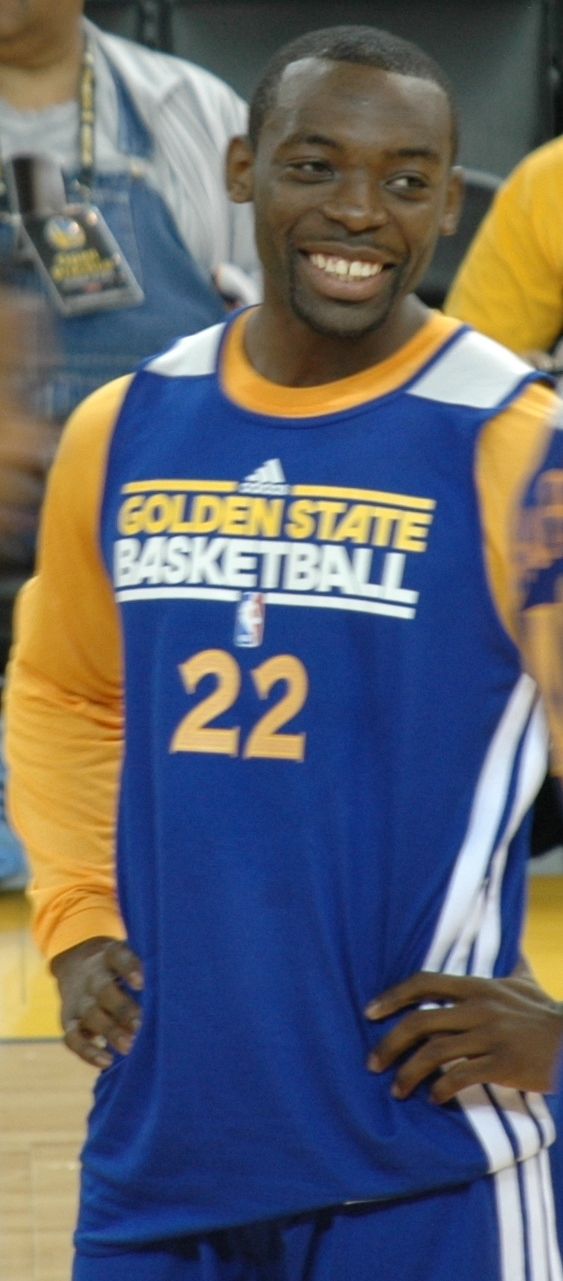
Charles Jenkins, Hofstra, 2010 and 2011

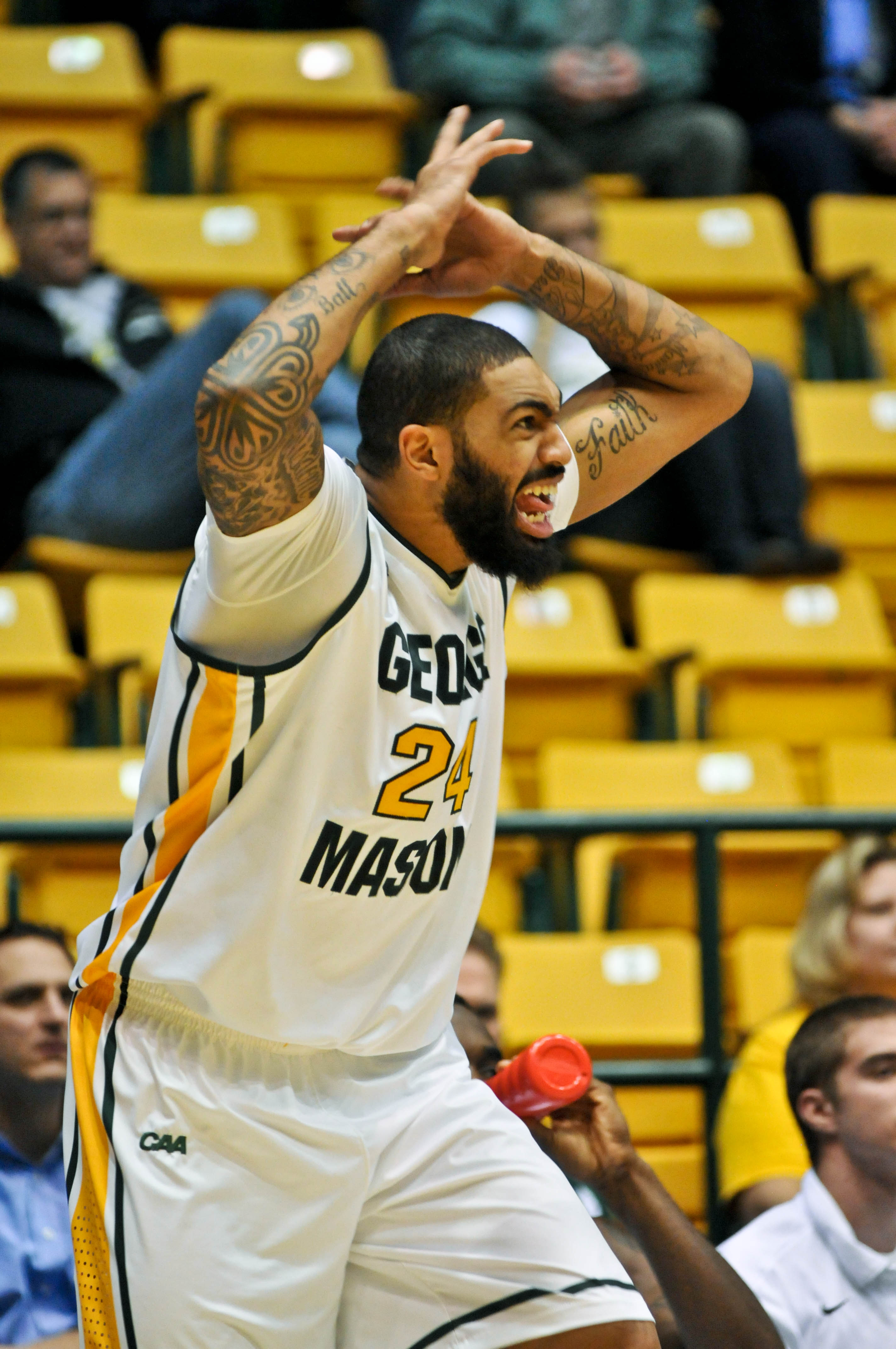
Ryan Pearson, George Mason, 2012

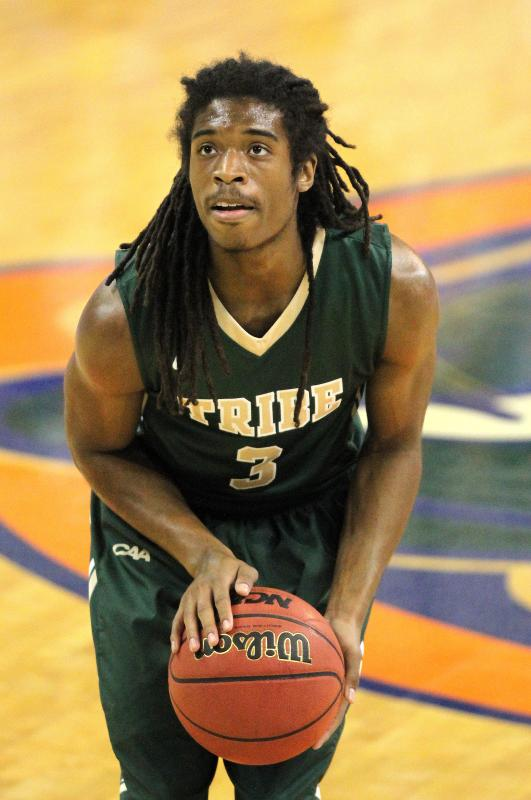
Marcus Thornton, William & Mary, 2015

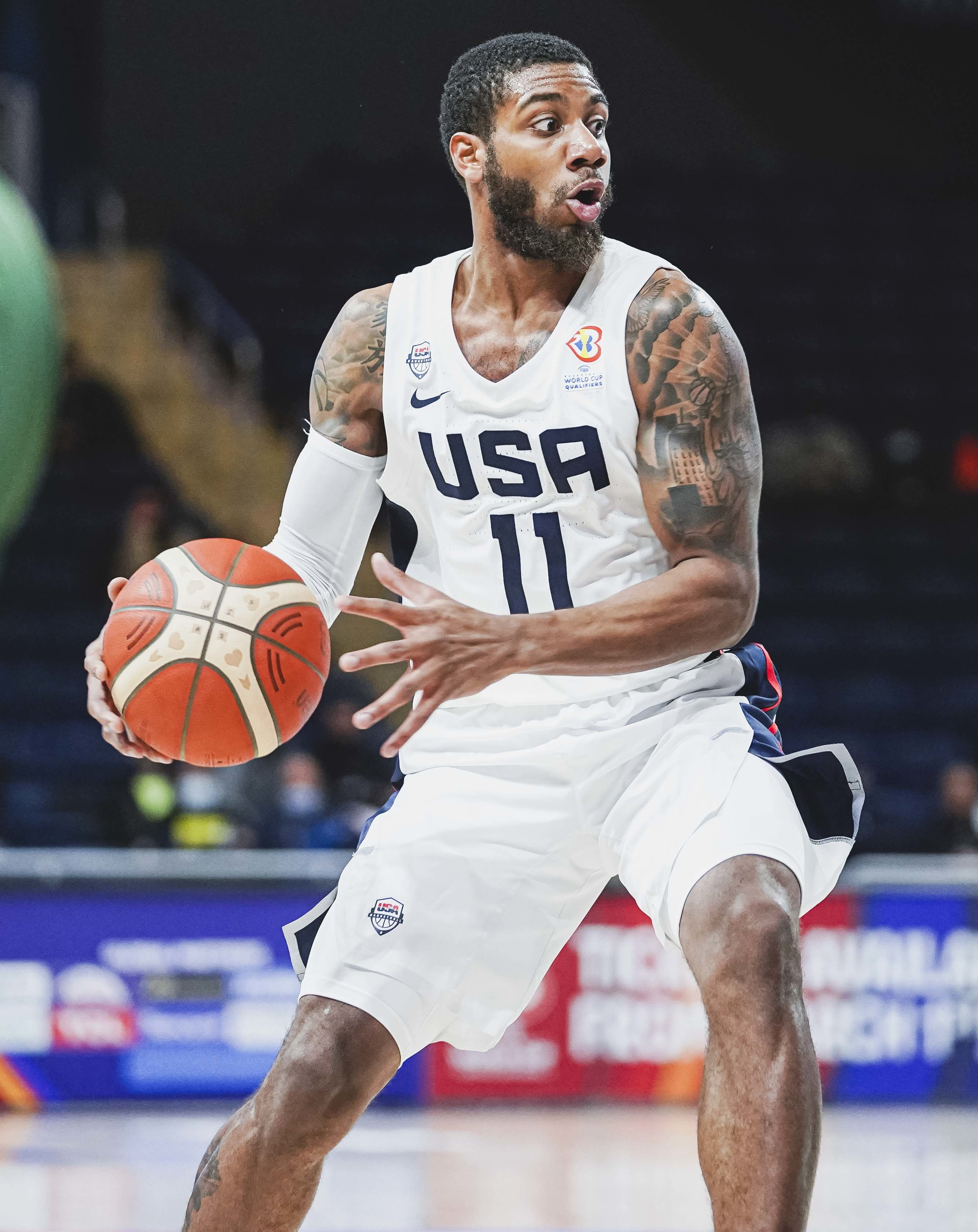
Justin Wright-Foreman, Hofstra, 2018 and 2019

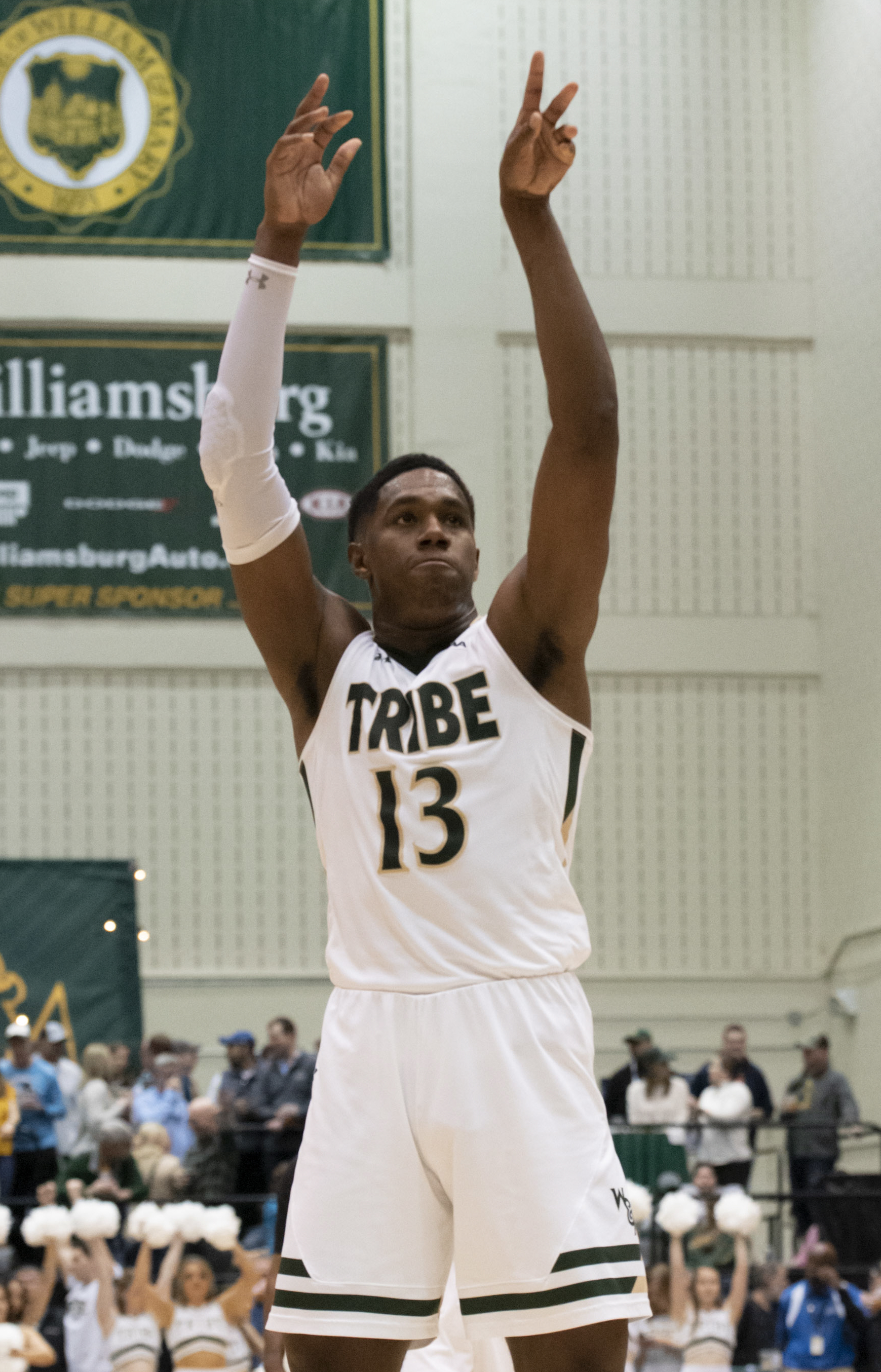
Nathan Knight, William & Mary, 2020

Season	Player	School	Position	Class	Reference
1982–83^{†}	Dan Ruland	James Madison	C	Senior	
1982–83^{†}	Carlos Yates	George Mason	F	Sophomore	
1983–84	Johnny Newman	Richmond	F	Sophomore	
1984–85	David Robinson	Navy	C	Sophomore	
1985–86	David Robinson (2)	Navy	C	Junior	
1986–87	David Robinson* (3)	Navy	C	Senior	
1987–88	Kenny Sanders	George Mason	F	Junior	
1988–89	Blue Edwards	East Carolina	F	Senior	
1989–90	Steve Hood	James Madison	SG	Junior	
1990–91	Steve Hood (2)	James Madison	SG	Senior	
1991–92	Curtis Blair	Richmond	SG	Senior	
1992–93	Brian Gilgeous	American	F / G	Senior	
1993–94	Odell Hodge	Old Dominion	C / F	Sophomore	
1994–95	Petey Sessoms	Old Dominion	F	Senior	
1995–96	Bernard Hopkins	VCU	F	Senior	
1996–97	Odell Hodge (2)	Old Dominion	C / F	Senior	
1997–98	Jarod Stevenson	Richmond	SF	Senior	
1998–99	George Evans	George Mason	C / F	Sophomore	
1999–00	George Evans (2)	George Mason	C / F	Junior	
2000–01	George Evans (3)	George Mason	C / F	Senior	
2001–02	Brett Blizzard	UNC Wilmington	SG	Junior	
2002–03	Brett Blizzard (2)	UNC Wilmington	SG	Senior	
2003–04	Domonic Jones	VCU	PG	Senior	
2004–05	Alex Loughton	Old Dominion	C / F	Junior	
2005–06	J. J. Barea	Northeastern	PG	Senior	
2006–07	Loren Stokes	Hofstra	G	Senior	
2007–08	Eric Maynor	VCU	PG	Junior	
2008–09	Eric Maynor (2)	VCU	PG	Senior	
2009–10	Charles Jenkins	Hofstra	PG	Junior	
2010–11	Charles Jenkins (2)	Hofstra	PG	Senior	
2011–12	Ryan Pearson	George Mason	SF	Senior	
2012–13	Jerrelle Benimon	Towson	PF	Junior	
2013–14	Jerrelle Benimon (2)	Towson	PF	Senior	
2014–15	Marcus Thornton	William & Mary	SG	Senior	
2015–16	Juan'ya Green	Hofstra	PG	Senior	
2016–17	T. J. Williams	Northeastern	PG	Senior	
2017–18	Justin Wright-Foreman	Hofstra	PG	Junior	
2018–19	Justin Wright-Foreman (2)	Hofstra	PG	Senior	
2019–20	Nathan Knight	William & Mary	PF	Senior	
2020–21	Matt Lewis	James Madison	SG	Senior	
2021–22	Aaron Estrada	Hofstra	PG / SG	Junior	
2022–23	Aaron Estrada (2)	Hofstra	PG / SG	Senior	
2023–24	Tyler Thomas	Hofstra	SG	Graduate	
2024–25	Tyler Tejada	Towson	SG	Sophomore	
2025–26	Cruz Davis	Hofstra	PG / SG	Junior	

== Winners by school ==
The CAA began in 1982 when it was known as the ECAC South. The CAA was officially organized in 1985 when it expanded from only a basketball conference. Awards from the ECAC are included.

Years of joining reflect the calendar year in which each school joined the CAA or ECAC South.

School (year joined)	Winners	Years
Hofstra (2001)	10	2007, 2010, 2011, 2016, 2018, 2019, 2022, 2023, 2024, 2026
George Mason (1982) (Note: George Mason University left for the Atlantic 10 Conference (A-10) in 2013.)	6	1983^{†}, 1988, 1999, 2000, 2001, 2012
James Madison (1982) (Note: James Madison University left for the Sun Belt Conference (SBC) in 2022.)	4	1983^{†}, 1990, 1991, 2021
Old Dominion (1991) (Note: Old Dominion University left for Conference USA (CUSA) in 2013. It is now in the SBC.)	4	1994, 1995, 1997, 2005
VCU (1995) (Note: Virginia Commonwealth University was a member until joining the A-10 in 2012.)	4	1996, 2004, 2008, 2009
Navy (1982) (Note: The United States Naval Academy (Navy) was a member until joining the Patriot League in 1991.)	3	1985, 1986, 1987
Richmond (1982) (Note: The University of Richmond was a member until joining the A-10 in 2001.)	3	1984, 1992, 1998
Towson (2001)	3	2013, 2014, 2025
Northeastern (2005)	2	2006, 2017
UNC Wilmington (1985)	2	2002, 2003
William & Mary (1982)	2	2015, 2020
American (1984) (Note: American University was a member until it joined the Patriot League in 2001.)	1	1993
East Carolina (1982) (Note: East Carolina was a member until it joined CUSA in 2001. It is now in the American Athletic Conference.)	1	1989
Campbell (2023)	0	—
Charleston (2013)	0	—
Delaware (2001) (Note: Delaware will leave for CUSA after the 2024–25 season.)	0	—
Drexel (2001)	0	—
Elon (2014)	0	—
Georgia State (2005) (Note: Georgia State University left for the SBC in 2013.)	0	—
Hampton (2022)	0	—
Monmouth (2022)	0	—
North Carolina A&T (2022)	0	—
Stony Brook (2022)	0	—
