= 2008 Patriot League men's basketball tournament =

- Classification: Division I
- Season: 2007–08
- Teams: 8
- Site: campus sites
- Champions: American (1st title)
- Winning coach: Jeff Jones (1st title)
- MVP: Garrison Carr (American)

2007–08 Patriot League men's basketball standings
	Conf.				Overall
Team	W		L	PCT	W		L	PCT
American †	10	–	4	.714	21	–	12	.636
Navy	9	–	5	.643	16	–	14	.533
Colgate	7	–	7	.500	18	–	14	.563
Lehigh	7	–	7	.500	14	–	15	.483
Army	6	–	8	.429	14	–	16	.467
Lafayette	6	–	8	.429	15	–	15	.500
Bucknell	6	–	8	.429	12	–	19	.387
Holy Cross	5	–	9	.357	15	–	14	.517
† 2008 Patriot League tournament winner

The 2008 Patriot League men's basketball tournament, a part of the 2007-08 NCAA Division I men's basketball season, took place March 5, 2008, as a single-elimination tournament, with games being played at the higher seeds' home courts. The American University Eagles won the league's regular season, and received the number one seed in the tournament. They kept their home advantage throughout the tournament and defeated Colgate, 52–46, on March 14, 2008, to win the conference tournament and received the Patriot League's automatic bid for the 2008 NCAA tournament.

== Before the tournament ==
Prior to the season defending champion Holy Cross, was predicted to finish first in the league once again, while Bucknell, a team who had won a game in both the 2005 and 2006 NCAA Tournaments, was predicted to finish second. However the league was unpredictable, as both teams ended their conference regular seasons with a losing record. Lafayette started off strong in league play, but quickly fell by the wayside. American and Navy, teams predicted to finish fifth and seventh respectively, ended their seasons in first and second in the league, with American gaining home court advantage throughout the tournament.

== Bracket ==
The Patriot League announced the bracket and seed on March 3, 2008.

Quarterfinals; March 5
1	American	62
8	Holy Cross	60
4	Lehigh	61
5	Army	64*
3	Colgate	76
6	Lafayette	74
7	Bucknell	87***
2	Navy	86

Semifinals; March 9
1	American	72
5	Army	60
3	Colgate	54
7	Bucknell	40

Championship; March 14
1	American	52
3	Colgate	46

* represents an overtime period
