= Dan Ruland =

American basketball player (born 1960)

Personal information
- Born: August 24, 1960 (age 66) Annapolis, Maryland, U.S.
- Listed height: 6 ft 8 in (2.03 m)
- Listed weight: 240 lb (109 kg)

Career information
- High school: Annapolis (Annapolis, Maryland); Fork Union Military Academy (Fork Union, Virginia)
- College: James Madison University (1979–1983)
- NBA draft: 1983: 3rd round, 70th overall pick
- Drafted by: Philadelphia 76ers
- Playing career: 1983–present
- Position: Center

Career history
- Catalonia-Barcelona, Spain
- Florida Stingers (CBA)
- Gold Coast Stingrays (USBL)
- West Palm Beach Stingrays (USBL)
- Charleston Gunners (CBA)
- Caen Basket Calvados (Caen, France)
- RBC Verviers-Pepinster (Verviers, Belgium)
- Basket CRO Lyon (2 years) (Lyon, France)

Career highlights
- CAA co-Player of the Year (1983); First-team All-CAA (1983)
- Stats at Basketball Reference

Daniel Keefe Ruland (born August 24, 1960) is an American former professional basketball player. He played college basketball at James Madison University (JMU) between 1979 and 1983.

== College ==
Ruland, a native of Annapolis, Maryland, played high school basketball at Annapolis High School for four years before spending one postgraduate year at Fork Union Military Academy. He chose to attend JMU to play for the Dukes and was a 6'8", 240-pound center. He is credited with being a key player during what some consider JMU's greatest era of men's basketball, one in which they earned three straight trips to the NCAA Tournament and won each of their opening round games against traditionally national powerhouse basketball programs.

During Ruland's collegiate career, he scored 1,255 points and grabbed 640 rebounds. He improved his season scoring averages each successive year: 5.9, 8.4, 12.7 and 15.1 points per game, respectively, for a career average of 10.1 points per game. James Madison won the ECAC South regular season title in 1982 and won the ECAC Tournament championships in 1981 and 1983. In each of his final three years, the Dukes qualified for the NCAA Tournament, where they won each of their first-round games against Georgetown (1981), Ohio State (1982) and West Virginia (1983), giving them a reputation as a "giant killer" during the postseason.

In 1984–85, the ECAC South became what is now known as the Colonial Athletic Association, an NCAA Division I athletic conference, but the CAA considers its awards to be official dating back to the days of the ECAC South. Ruland was named the co-CAA Player of the Year with Carlos Yates of George Mason, which was the first-ever CAA Player of the Year honor in men's basketball. Through the 2017–18 season, it is still the only tie in the award's history.

== Professional and later life ==
After college, Ruland was drafted by the Philadelphia 76ers in the third round (70th overall) in the 1983 NBA draft. He never played in the league, however, and spent the next eight years playing at various clubs in Europe, the United States' Continental Basketball Association and the United States Basketball League. Since 1991, he worked in the Reference Laboratory industry- LabCorp, Quest Diagnostics, Solstas Lab Partners, Sonic Healthcare) in his post-professional basketball life.
