= Jeff Jones (basketball) =

American basketball coach (born 1960)

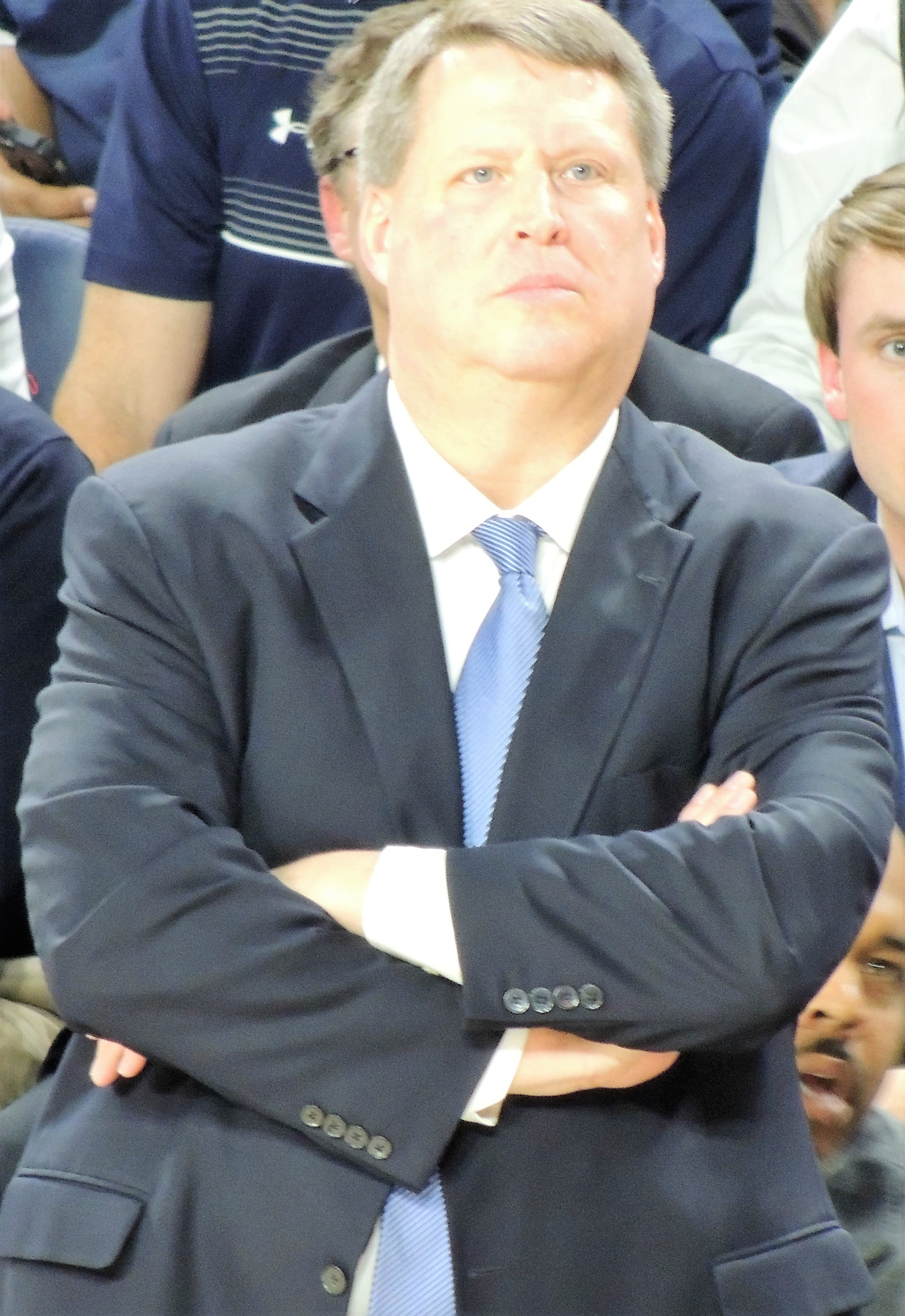
- Jones in 2015

Biographical details
- Born: June 29, 1960 (age 66); Owensboro, Kentucky, U.S.

Playing career
- 1978–1982: Virginia
- Position: Point guard

Coaching career (HC unless noted)
- 1982–1990: Virginia (assistant)
- 1990–1998: Virginia
- 1999–2000: Rhode Island (assistant)
- 2000–2013: American
- 2013–2024: Old Dominion

Head coaching record
- Overall: 560–417 (.573)
- Tournaments: 6–8 (NCAA Division I); 8–1 (NIT); 0–1 (CIT); 2–1 (CBI); 3–0 (V16)

Accomplishments and honors

Championships
- NIT (1992); Vegas 16 (2016); ACC regular season (1995); 4 Patriot League regular season (2002, 2004, 2008, 2009); 2 Patriot League tournament (2008, 2009); C-USA regular season (2019); C-USA tournament (2019)

Awards
- 2× Patriot League Coach of the Year (2002, 2009); C-USA Coach of the Year (2019)

Jeffrey Allen Jones (born June 29, 1960) is an American former college basketball player and coach. He was a four-year starter for the Virginia Cavaliers, helping his team to win an NIT title and reach the NCAA Final Four. He became an assistant coach and eventually the head coach at his alma mater, with a tenure of eight years; he then coached the American Eagles for thirteen years; and the Old Dominion Monarchs for eleven years. In total, Jones was a head coach for thirty-two years, amassing a 560–417 (.573) overall record and a winning record with each of his three programs, reaching the NCAA Tournament at each stop—including an Elite Eight run with Virginia in 1995.

== Playing career ==
=== High school ===
Jones graduated from Apollo High School in Owensboro, Kentucky. He was inducted into the Apollo High School Hall of Fame. His father, Bob, is a former coach of Kentucky Wesleyan, which he led to the 1973 NCAA College Division title.

=== College ===
He played point guard at the University of Virginia from 1978 to 1982. As a four-year starter at Virginia, Jones was known as a leader and prolific passer. During his playing career, the Cavaliers compiled an overall record of 102–28 (.785), while he helped lead the Cavaliers to two NCAA tournaments and two NITs during his career. Virginia captured the 1980 NIT title, and advanced to the NCAA Final Four in 1981.

Jones finished his career as Virginia's all-time assists leader (598), and his 200 assists during the 1979–80 season was UVa's single-season record until both marks were later broken by John Crotty. Jones served as the team captain as a senior during the 1981–82 season and played in 129 games during his career. For his career, he averaged 6.6 points and 4.6 assists per game, while shooting 52.2 percent from the field and 74.3% from the free-throw line.

Despite being drafted by the NBA's Indiana Pacers in 1982, Jones never played as a professional. He graduated from Virginia in the same year with a Bachelor of Science degree in psychology.

== Coaching career ==
=== University of Virginia ===
After graduation, he spent eight seasons as an assistant coach under Terry Holland at Virginia until being tabbed the 8th head coach in Virginia Cavaliers history in 1990. He would go on to lead that program for eight seasons. He led Virginia to six postseason appearances (five NCAA, one NIT), a share of the 1995 ACC regular-season title and four 20-win campaigns. He beat Roy Williams and #1 seeded Kansas in Kansas City to reach the Elite 8 in 1995.

Jones' tenure in Charlottesville crested at that point; he only had one winning season in his final three years. He resigned at the end of the 1997–98 season, having spent the first 20 years of his adult life at UVa as either a player, assistant coach, or head coach.

=== American University ===
Following a brief stint as associate head coach at Rhode Island, Jones was hired as the head coach at American University in 2000. After the school moved from the Colonial Athletic Association, he guided American to the 2002, 2004, 2008 and 2009 Patriot League regular season championships, and in 2002 he was honored as the Basketball America Patriot League Coach of the Year. However, the team fell in the conference tournament title game each year from 2002 to 2004, failing to garner an NCAA tournament bid.

On December 22, 2007, Jones led AU to its first victory over the University of Maryland in the last 80 years. Jones previously coached AU to victory over Florida State University, making him the only Patriot League coach to beat an ACC team.

On March 14, 2008, Jones led AU to its first NCAA tournament, as the Eagles beat Colgate 52–46. On March 22, 2008, Jones and the American University faced the Tennessee Volunteers at BJCC Arena in Birmingham, AL. Despite leading early on, American lost to Tennessee 72–57, ending American's NCAA trip.

The next year, Jones led the Eagles into the 2009 NCAA Division I men's basketball tournament on March 19, 2009. After holding a 14-point lead over Villanova early in the second half, the 14th-seeded Eagles let the game slip away at the end, falling to Villanova at the Wachovia Center.

Despite being a #2 seed in the 2011 Patriot League tournament, American was upset in the semifinal round, getting knocked off by Lafayette College in double overtime, 73–71.

=== Old Dominion University ===
On April 3, 2013, Jones was hired as the new head coach at Old Dominion University. As of the 2022–23 season, he had a 200–125 season record at ODU and had taken them to one NCAA tournament.

On December 20, 2023, Jones suffered a heart attack prior to coaching the Monarchs in the 2023 Diamond Head Classic. Despite making a full recovery, Jones resigned for the remainder of the season while special assistant coach Kieran Donohue fulfilled his role as the interim head coach. On February 26, 2024, he announced his retirement from coaching.

== Head coaching record ==
Record table
Season	Team	Overall	Conference	Standing	Postseason
Virginia Cavaliers (Atlantic Coast Conference) (1990–1998)
1990–91	Virginia	21–12	6–8	T–5th	NCAA Division I First Round
1991–92	Virginia	20–13	8–8	T–4th	NIT champion
1992–93	Virginia	21–10	9–7	5th	NCAA Division I Sweet 16
1993–94	Virginia	18–13	8–8	T–4th	NCAA Division I Second Round
1994–95	Virginia	25–9	12–4	T–1st	NCAA Division I Elite Eight
1995–96	Virginia	12–15	6–10	7th	
1996–97	Virginia	18–13	7–9	6th	NCAA Division I First Round
1997–98	Virginia	11–19	3–13	9th	
Virginia:		146–104 (.584)	59–67 (.468)		
American Eagles (Colonial Athletic Association) (2000–2001)
2000–01	American	7–20	3–13	9th	
American Eagles (Patriot League) (2001–2013)
2001–02	American	18–12	10–4	1st	
2002–03	American	16–14	9–5	T–2nd	
2003–04	American	18–13	10–4	T–1st	
2004–05	American	16–11	9–5	3rd	
2005–06	American	12–17	7–7	4th	
2006–07	American	16–14	7–7	T–3rd	
2007–08	American	21–12	10–4	1st	NCAA Division I First Round
2008–09	American	24–8	13–1	1st	NCAA Division I First Round
2009–10	American	11–20	7–7	T–4th	
2010–11	American	22–9	11–3	2nd	
2011–12	American	20–12	10–4	3rd	CIT First Round
2012–13	American	10–20	5–9	7th	
American:		211–182 (.537)	111–73 (.603)		
Old Dominion Monarchs (Conference USA) (2013–2022)
2013–14	Old Dominion	18–18	9–7	6th	CBI Semifinal
2014–15	Old Dominion	27–8	13–5	T–2nd	NIT Semifinal
2015–16	Old Dominion	25–13	12–6	T–3rd	Vegas 16 champion
2016–17	Old Dominion	19–12	12–6	T–3rd	
2017–18	Old Dominion	25–7	15–3	2nd	
2018–19	Old Dominion	26–9	13–5	1st	NCAA Division I First Round
2019–20	Old Dominion	13–19	9–9	T–7th	
2020–21	Old Dominion	15–8	11–5	2nd (East)	
2021–22	Old Dominion	13–19	8–10	5th (East)	
Old Dominion Monarchs (Sun Belt Conference) (2022–2024)
2022–23	Old Dominion	19–12	11–7	T–5th	
2023–24	Old Dominion	3–6			
Old Dominion:		203–131 (.608)	113–63 (.642)		
Total:		560–417 (.573)			
National champion Postseason invitational champion Conference regular season champion Conference regular season and conference tournament champion Division regular season champion Division regular season and conference tournament champion Conference tournament champion
