= 2007–08 NJIT Highlanders men's basketball team =

American college basketball season

2007–08 NJIT Highlanders men's basketball
- Conference: Independent
- Record: 0–29
- Head coach: Jim Casciano (Seventh season)
- Assistant coaches: Wendell Alexis (Third season); Steve Brodzinski (First season); David Grande (Third season)
- Home arena: Estelle & Zoom Fleisher Athletic Center; Prudential Center

2007–08 NCAA Division I men's basketball independents standings
	Conf.				Overall
Team	W		L	PCT	W		L	PCT
Texas–Pan American		–		–	18	–	13	.581
Utah Valley State		–		–	15	–	14	.517
Savannah State		–		–	13	–	18	.419
Chicago State		–		–	11	–	17	.393
Longwood		–		–	9	–	22	.290
Cal State Bakersfield		–		–	8	–	21	.276
Presbyterian		–		–	5	–	25	.167
North Carolina Central		–		–	4	–	26	.133
NJIT		–		–	0	–	29	.000
Rankings from AP Poll

The 2007–08 NJIT Highlanders men's basketball team represented the New Jersey Institute of Technology and the NJIT Highlanders men's basketball program in the 2007–08 college basketball season.

They were the first team to go 0–29 in a single season, which is the worst winless season in NCAA Division I basketball history (however, it is not recognized as an official record since NJIT was in transition year two (of three) from Division II to Division I and, despite playing exclusively Division I opposition, were only considered a provisional member). Their closest contests were nine-point defeats at Lehigh (67–58) and at Stony Brook (62–53).

Head coach Jim Casciano took an in-season temporary leave of absence for personal health matters and missed twelve games (November 11–December 15, 2007), with assistant coach Wendell Alexis assuming those duties during the absence.

The entire men's basketball coaching staff resigned, effective upon completion of the season.

== Roster ==
2007–08 NJIT Highlanders men's basketball team
Players
Coaches

Pos.	#	Name	Height	Weight	Year	Previous school	Hometown
F	32	Kyle Edwards	6 ft 6 in (1.98 m)	225 lb (102 kg)	Sr	Christian Heritage School	Fayetteville, GA
F	33	Brett Johnson	6 ft 4 in (1.93 m)	215 lb (98 kg)	Sr	Roman Catholic HS	Pennsauken, NJ
G	5	Courcy Magnus	6 ft 2 in (1.88 m)	177 lb (80 kg)	Sr	Plymouth Whitemarsh HS	Plymouth Meeting, PA
G	24	Kraig Peters	6 ft 4 in (1.93 m)	191 lb (87 kg)	Sr	Lenape HS	Mount Laurel, NJ
F	20	Johnathan Dixon (redshirt)	6 ft 4 in (1.93 m)	215 lb (98 kg)	Jr	Lawrenceville PS	North Brunswick, NJ
F	15	Gary Garris (I)	6 ft 5 in (1.96 m)	205 lb (93 kg)	Jr	American; Hun School	Ledgewood, NJ
F	35	Nesho Milosevic	6 ft 8 in (2.03 m)	245 lb (111 kg)	Jr	Sierra; Slobodan Skerovic	Bar, Yugoslavia
C	00	Dan Stonkus	6 ft 9 in (2.06 m)	245 lb (111 kg)	So	South Brunswick HS	Monmouth Junction, NJ
G/F	23	Anthony Collier	6 ft 4 in (1.93 m)	175 lb (79 kg)	RS Fr	Southfield-Lathrup HS	Farmington, MI
G	1	Tyler Epps	5 ft 11 in (1.8 m)	175 lb (79 kg)	Fr	North Mecklenburg HS	Charlotte, NC
G	21	Justin Garris	6 ft 3 in (1.91 m)	190 lb (86 kg)	Fr	Delbarton PS	Ledgewood, NJ
G	10	Rey Jefferson (W)	6 ft 2 in (1.88 m)	180 lb (82 kg)	Fr	Morristown–Beard PS	Budd Lake, NJ
G	12	Brendon Lyn	5 ft 9 in (1.75 m)	175 lb (79 kg)	Fr	Episcopal HS	Mount Vernon, NY
F	11	Paulius Skema	6 ft 8 in (2.03 m)	204 lb (93 kg)	Fr	Veritas Christian Academy	Vilnius, Lithuania
G	13	Jheryl Wilson	6 ft 3 in (1.91 m)	185 lb (84 kg)	Fr	St. Benedict's PS	Irvington, NJ

Head coach

- Jim Casciano (Drexel)

Assistant coach(es)

- Wendell Alexis (Syracuse)
- Steve Brodzinski (New York)
- David Grande (West Chester)

Legend

- (C) Team captain
- (S) Suspended
- (I) Ineligible
- (W) Walk-on
- Injured
- Current redshirt

Roster
Last update: February 24, 2008

== Schedule & Results ==
Date time, TV	Rank^{#}	Opponent^{#}	Result	Record	High points	High rebounds	High assists	Site (attendance) city, state
Regular Season
November 10, 2007*; 2:00 PM		Manhattan	L 28–70	0–1	8 – Milosevic	9 – Stonkus	2 – Lyn, Wilson	Estelle & Zoom Fleisher; Athletic Center (801); Newark, NJ
November 13, 2007*; 11:00 PM		at Washington; Dick's Sporting Goods NIT Season Tip-Off; West Regional; Semifinal	L 47–88	0–2	10 – J.Garris	6 – Milosevic	3 – Wilson	Bank of America Arena at Hec Edmundson Pavilion (8,655); Seattle, WA
November 14, 2007*; 7:30 PM		vs. High Point; Dick's Sporting Goods NIT Season Tip-Off; West Regional; Consolation	L 53–76	0–3	13 – Milosevic, Peters	8 – Stonkus	3 – Wilson	Bank of America Arena at Hec Edmundson Pavilion (7,006); Seattle, WA
November 20, 2007*; 7:00 PM		Vermont	L 71–91	0–4	16 – Peters	5 – Stonkus	4 – Wilson	Estelle & Zoom Fleisher; Athletic Center (890); Newark, NJ
November 24, 2007*; 2:00 PM		American	L 50–73	0–5	15 – Stonkus	6 – Milosevic	3 – Wilson	Estelle & Zoom Fleisher; Athletic Center (801); Newark, NJ
November 26, 2007*; 7:00 PM		at Lehigh	L 58–67	0–6	20 – Milosevic	6 – Skema	4 – Lyn	Donald B. Stabler Arena (549); Bethlehem, PA
November 28, 2007*; 7:05 PM		at Rider	L 58–84	0–7	14 – Milosevic	6 – Milosevic	3 – Lyn	Alumni Gymnasium (1,510); Lawrenceville, NJ
December 1, 2007*; 12:00 PM		at Maine	L 58–86	0–8	18 – Milosevic	16 – Milosevic	2 – J.Garris, Lyn, Wilson	Harold Alfond Sports Arena (1,279); Orono, ME
December 3, 2007*; 7:00 PM		at Lafayette	L 56–81	0–9	15 – Milosevic	9 – Milosevic	4 – Lyn	Allan P. Kirby Sports Center (1,013); Easton, PA
December 6, 2007*; 7:00 PM		Army	L 44–54	0–10	16 – Wilson	13 – Milosevic	3 – Wilson	Prudential Center (932); Newark, NJ
December 8, 2007*; 1:00 PM		at Fordham	L 44–88	0–11	12 – Milosevic	7 – Milosevic	4 – Wilson	Rose Hill Gymnasium (1,531); Bronx, NY
December 10, 2007*; 7:00 PM		at Stony Brook	L 53–62	0–12	15 – Milosevic	13 – Milosevic	2 – Peters, Wilson	Stony Brook University Arena (706); Brookhaven, NY
December 13, 2007*; 7:00 PM		Rutgers	L 55–65	0–13	21 – Peters	11 – Peters	3 – Peters	Prudential Center (1,724); Newark, NJ
December 30, 2007*; 3:30 PM		at Central Florida; UCF Holiday Classic Semifinal	L 50–82	0–14	8 – J.Garris, Peters	6 – Milosevic	2 – Peters, Stonkus	UCF Arena (3,321); Orlando, FL
December 31, 2007*; 1:00 PM		vs. Texas–Pan American; UCF Holiday Classic Consolation	L 61–76	0–15	19 – Peters	9 – Milosevic	4 – Peters	UCF Arena (3,207); Orlando, FL
January 2, 2008*; 7:15 PM		at Navy	L 55–84	0–16	25 – Milosevic	10 – Milosevic	5 – J.Garris	Alumni Hall (1,075); Annapolis, MD
January 5, 2008*; 7:00 PM		at Pennsylvania	L 68–79	0–17	12 – Peters, Wilson	9 – Peters	3 – Wilson	Palestra (2,758); Philadelphia, PA
January 12, 2008*; 2:00 PM		Columbia	L 52–64	0–18	15 – Peters	7 – Peters, Stonkus	4 – Wilson	Estelle & Zoom Fleisher; Athletic Center (207); Newark, NJ
January 15, 2008*; 8:00 PM		Cornell	L 33–64	0–19	10 – Peters	7 – Peters	3 – Epps	Prudential Center (400); Newark, NJ
January 19, 2008*; 4:00 PM		at Chicago State	L 62–79	0–20	20 – Milosevic	10 – Milosevic	6 – Peters, Wilson	Emil and Patricia Jones; Convocation Center (557); Chicago, IL
January 26, 2008*; 1:00 PM		Texas–Pan American	L 42–54	0–21	11 – Wilson	5 – J.Garris, Milosevic	3 – Wilson	Prudential Center (300); Newark, NJ
January 29, 2008*; 7:00 PM		Loyola (Maryland)	L 54–72	0–22	12 – Wilson	10 – Stonkus	2 – J.Garris, Wilson	Estelle & Zoom Fleisher; Athletic Center (355); Newark, NJ
February 2, 2008*; 2:00 PM		Utah Valley State	L 69–81	0–23	27 – Milosevic	12 – Milosevic	7 – J.Garris	Estelle & Zoom Fleisher; Athletic Center (310); Newark, NJ
February 4, 2008*; 7:00 PM		Longwood	L 68–78	0–24	16 – Edwards, Peters	8 – Edwards	3 – J.Garris	Estelle & Zoom Fleisher; Athletic Center (130); Newark, NJ
February 9, 2008*; 8:05 PM		at Texas–Pan American	L 64–90	0–25	13 – J.Garris, Milosevic	8 – Milosevic	2 – Epps, Wilson	UTPA Fieldhouse (n/a); Edinburg, TX
February 13, 2008*; 7:00 PM		at La Salle	L 65–87	0–26	21 – Milosevic	11 – Milosevic	4 – Magnus	Tom Gola Arena (1,211); Philadelphia, PA
February 16, 2008*; 4:00 PM		Chicago State	L 76–86	0–27	22 – Milosevic	13 – Milosevic	4 – J.Garris	Estelle & Zoom Fleisher; Athletic Center (300); Newark, NJ
February 18, 2008*; 7:00 PM		at Longwood	L 78–96	0–28	26 – Peters	14 – Milosevic	3 – Wilson	Willett Hall (618); Farmville, VA
February 23, 2008*; 5:00 PM		at Utah Valley State	L 50–76	0–29	13 – Peters	7 – Skema	2 – Epps, Peters, Wilson	McKay Events Center (1,523); Orem, UT
*Non-conference game. ^{#}Rankings from AP poll. (#) Tournament seedings in parentheses. All times are in Eastern Standard Time (EST).
