= Cruz Davis =

American basketball player

Texas Tech Red Raiders
- Position: Point guard / shooting guard
- Conference: Big 12 Conference

Personal information
- Born: September 24, 2003 (age 23)
- Listed height: 6 ft 3 in (1.91 m)
- Listed weight: 170 lb (77 kg)

Career information
- High school: Huntington Prep (Huntington, West Virginia)
- College: Iona (2022–2023); St. John's (2023–2024); Hofstra (2024–2026); Texas Tech (2026–present)

Career highlights
- CAA Player of the Year (2026); First-team All-CAA (2026)

Cruz Davis (born September 24, 2003) is an American college basketball player for the Texas Tech Red Raiders of the Big 12 Conference. He previously played for the Iona Gaels, St. John's Red Storm, and Hofstra Pride.

== Early life ==
Davis attended Huntington Prep School in Huntington, West Virginia. He initially attended iSchool in Lewisville, Texas, before transferring to Huntington for his senior year. Davis averaged 16.7 points and five assists per game as a senior. A four-star recruit, he was originally committed to Oregon State, but he later changed his commitment to play college basketball at Iona University.

== College career ==
After averaging 6.5 points per game as a true freshman at Iona, Davis transferred to St. John's University, following head coach Rick Pitino. After playing sparingly for a season at St. John's, he transferred for a second time to Hofstra University. In his first season with the Pride, Davis averaged 14.5 points, 4.2 assists, and 1.5 steals per game. He improved the following season, becoming the leading scorer in the Coastal Athletic Association. At the conclusion of the regular season, Davis was named the CAA Player of the Year. He averaged 20.1 points, 4.7 assists, 3.7 rebounds and 1.1 steals per game. Davis transferred to Texas Tech after the season.

== Career statistics ==
Legend
GP	Games played	GS	Games started	MPG	Minutes per game
FG%	Field goal percentage	3P%	3-point field goal percentage	FT%	Free throw percentage
RPG	Rebounds per game	APG	Assists per game	SPG	Steals per game
BPG	Blocks per game	PPG	Points per game	**Bold**	Career high

=== College ===
Year	Team	GP	GS	MPG	FG%	3P%	FT%	RPG	APG	SPG	BPG	PPG
2022–23	Iona	24	7	18.9	.419	.317	.763	1.4	1.0	.7	.3	6.5
2023–24	St. John's	4	0	6.5	.200	.000	1.000	1.3	1.8	.5	.3	1.8
2024–25	Hofstra	32	32	34.9	.412	.388	.732	3.8	4.4	1.5	.2	14.4
2025–26	Hofstra	35	35	37.9	.440	.400	.830	3.7	4.7	1.1	.3	20.1
