= 2009 Patriot League men's basketball tournament =

- Classification: Division I
- Season: 2008–09
- Teams: 8
- Site: campus sites
- Champions: American (2nd title)
- Winning coach: Jeff Jones (2nd title)
- MVP: Garrison Carr (American)
- Television: ESPN2 (champ. game)

2008–09 Patriot League men's basketball standings
	Conf.				Overall
Team	W		L	PCT	W		L	PCT
American †	13	–	1	.929	24	–	8	.750
Holy Cross	11	–	3	.786	18	–	14	.563
Navy	8	–	6	.571	19	–	11	.633
Army	6	–	8	.429	11	–	19	.367
Lehigh	5	–	9	.357	15	–	14	.517
Colgate	5	–	9	.357	10	–	20	.333
Bucknell	4	–	10	.286	7	–	23	.233
Lafayette	4	–	10	.286	8	–	22	.267
† 2009 Patriot League tournament winner

The 2009 Patriot League men's basketball tournament, a part of the 2008-09 NCAA Division I men's basketball season, took place March 4, 2009, as a single-elimination tournament, with games being played at the higher seeds' home courts. The American University Eagles won the league's regular season, and received the number one seed in the tournament. The higher seed in each match-up was the host team for each game. The Eagles became the seventh team to repeat as Patriot League champions when they beat the second seeded Holy Cross Crusaders 73–57 in the championship game, which was broadcast live on ESPN2.

== Bracket ==
The Patriot League announced the bracket and seed on February 28, 2009.

Quarterfinals; March 4
8	Lafayette	56
1	American	78
5	Lehigh	50
4	Army	53
6	Colgate	64*
3	Navy	59
7	Bucknell	56
2	Holy Cross	75

Semifinals; March 8
1	American	61
4	Army	60
6	Colgate	44
2	Holy Cross	61

Championship; March 13
1	American	73
2	Holy Cross	57

* represents an overtime period
