= Aaron Estrada =

American basketball player (born 2001)

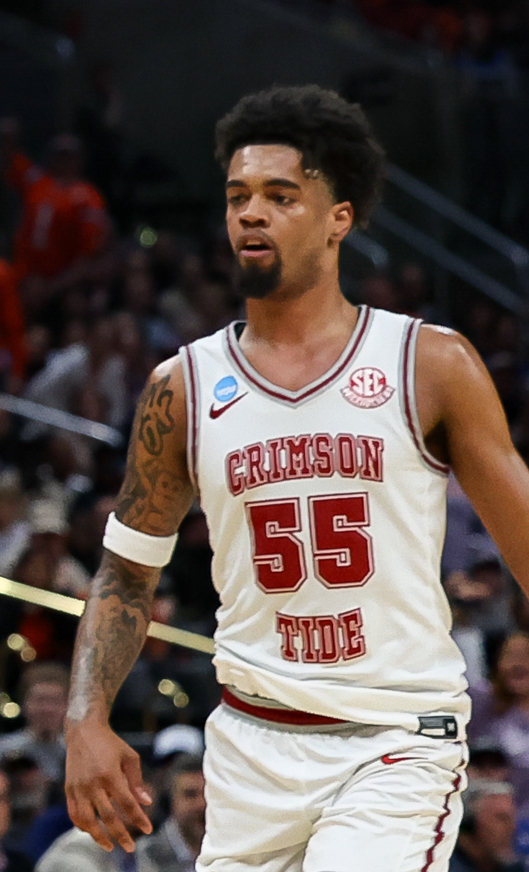
- Estrada in 2024

No. 1 – Boulazac Basket Dordogne
- Position: Shooting guard / point guard
- League: Betclic ÉLITE

Personal information
- Born: February 3, 2001 (age 25) Woodbury, New Jersey, U.S.
- Listed height: 6 ft 3 in (1.91 m)
- Listed weight: 190 lb (86 kg)

Career information
- High school: Woodbury (Woodbury, New Jersey); St. Benedict's Prep (Newark, New Jersey)
- College: Saint Peter's (2019–2020); Oregon (2020–2021); Hofstra (2021–2023); Alabama (2023–2024)
- NBA draft: 2024: undrafted
- Playing career: 2024–present

Career history
- 2024–2025: Motor City Cruise
- 2025–2026: Oostende
- 2026: Karditsa
- 2026–present: Boulazac Basket Dordogne

Career highlights
- 2× CAA Player of the Year (2022, 2023); 2× First-team All-CAA (2022, 2023); Third-team All-MAAC (2020); MAAC Rookie of the Year (2020); Haggerty Award winner (2023)
- Stats at NBA.com
- Stats at Basketball Reference

Aaron S. Estrada (born February 3, 2001) is an American professional basketball player for Boulazac of the LNB Élite. He played college basketball for the Saint Peter's Peacocks, Oregon Ducks, Hofstra Pride and Alabama Crimson Tide. He is a two-time Coastal Athletic Association Player of the Year (2022, 2023).

== High school career ==
Estrada attended Woodbury Junior-Senior High School. As a junior, he averaged 21.5 points, seven rebounds, and six assists per game. Estrada scored 23 points and made the game-winning foul shots as the Thundering Herd beat Cresskill High School 60–58 to capture their first Group 1 state title. He transferred to St. Benedict's Prep for his senior year. Estrada was featured in a documentary series called Benedict Men, on the streaming platform Quibi. In July 2019, Estrada committed to playing college basketball for Saint Peter's, choosing the Peacocks over East Carolina, Robert Morris, and Wagner.

== College career ==
Estrada averaged 8.1 points, 2.5 rebounds, and 1.9 assists per game as a freshman. He earned MAAC Rookie of the Year honors. Estrada opted to transfer to Oregon after the season, choosing the Ducks over Creighton and Syracuse. As a sophomore, he averaged 3.1 points and 1.9 rebounds per game, shooting 42.3 percent from the field. Following the season, Estrada transferred to Hofstra. After arriving at Hofstra, he focused on losing weight and improving his three-point shooting. On February 5, 2022, Estrada scored a career-high 35 points in a 85–78 overtime win against James Madison. He was named Colonial Athletic Association's Player of the Year. He repeated as conference player of the year the following season after averaging 20.3 points per game (second in the CAA) while leading Hofstra to a share of the regular season championship. He led the 2022–23 Pride to a share of the regular season conference championship and advancement into the second round of the 2023 NIT, where Hofstra pulled off a first-round upset over regional #1-seed Rutgers, 88–86, in overtime. Estrada transferred to Alabama for his final season of eligibility and averaged 13.4 points, 5.4 rebounds and 4.6 assists per game.

== Professional career ==
After going undrafted in the 2024 NBA draft, Estrada signed with the Detroit Pistons on October 7, 2024, but was waived on October 17. On October 29, he joined the Motor City Cruise.

For the 2025–26 season, Estrada signed with Filou Oostende of the Belgian BNXT League and the Champions League. He then spent part of 2026 playing for Karditsa in the Greek Basketball League. On July 31, 2026, he signed with Boulazac in France's LNB Élite.

== Career statistics ==
Legend
GP	Games played	GS	Games started	MPG	Minutes per game
FG%	Field goal percentage	3P%	3-point field goal percentage	FT%	Free throw percentage
RPG	Rebounds per game	APG	Assists per game	SPG	Steals per game
BPG	Blocks per game	PPG	Points per game	**Bold**	Career high

=== College ===
Year	Team	GP	GS	MPG	FG%	3P%	FT%	RPG	APG	SPG	BPG	PPG
2019–20	Saint Peter's	28	14	19.4	.405	.340	.879	2.5	1.9	.7	.0	8.1
2020–21	Oregon	9	0	12.4	.423	.214	.750	1.9	.8	.3	.0	3.1
2021–22	Hofstra	32	32	35.2	.477	.330	**.935**	**5.7**	**5.0**	1.5	**.2**	18.5
2022–23	Hofstra	31	31	**37.2**	**.478**	**.368**	.809	5.5	4.3	1.5	**.2**	**20.2**
2023–24	Alabama	**37**	**37**	30.9	.449	.313	.847	5.4	4.6	**1.6**	**.2**	13.4
Career		137	114	29.8	.460	.336	.863	4.7	3.8	1.3	.2	14.4
