= Jim Casciano =

Current position
- Title: Head coach

Biographical details
- Born: July 5, 1952 (age 74); Bridgeport, Pennsylvania, U.S.

Playing career
- 1973–1974: Drexel

Coaching career (HC unless noted)
- 1974–1975: Villanova (asst.)
- 1975–1976: Delaware (asst.)
- 1977–1980: Washington and Lee (asst.)
- 1980–1982: Old Dominion (asst.)
- 1982–1983: Castleton State
- 1983–1989: Saint Michael's
- 1989–1990: Radford (asst.)
- 1990–1993: Temple (women's asst.)
- 1993–1996: Valley Forge Academy
- 1996–2001: King's (PA)
- 2001–2008: NJIT
- 2011–2014: UMPI

Accomplishments and honors

Awards
- [1985-86 MECC Coach of the Year, VCMBCA Vermont Coach of the Year]

James Paul Casciano is an American college basketball coach and the former head men's basketball coach at the New Jersey Institute of Technology. He stepped down after going 0–29 with the Highlanders in 2007–08 although he was not physically there for a 12-game leave of absence (coached by assistant coach Wendell Alexis during his medical leaves), which is the worst winless season in unofficial NCAA Division I basketball history (record does not officially count because NJIT was transiting from Division II to Division I during that period).

== Head coaching record ==
Record table
Season	Team	Overall	Conference	Standing	Postseason
NJIT Highlanders (Central Atlantic Collegiate Conference) (2001–2006)
2001–02	NJIT	14–13	14–6	2nd	
2002–03	NJIT	18–11	16–4	1st	
2003–04	NJIT	10–18	9–11	7th	
2004–05	NJIT	11–17	10–10	T–6th	
2005–06	NJIT	8–19	5–17	12th	
NJIT Highlanders (Independent) (2006–2008)
2006–07	NJIT	5–24			
2007–08	NJIT	0–29			
NJIT:		66–131			
UMPI Owls (Independent) (2011–2014)
2011–12	UMPI	3–17			
2012–13	UMPI	11–14			
2013–14	UMPI	6–14			
UMPI:		24–45			
Total:		203–323			
National champion Postseason invitational champion Conference regular season champion Conference regular season and conference tournament champion Division regular season champion Division regular season and conference tournament champion Conference tournament champion

Only won 12 games in his first 3 seasons at King's College, PA
