= Sa'eed Nelson =

American basketball player

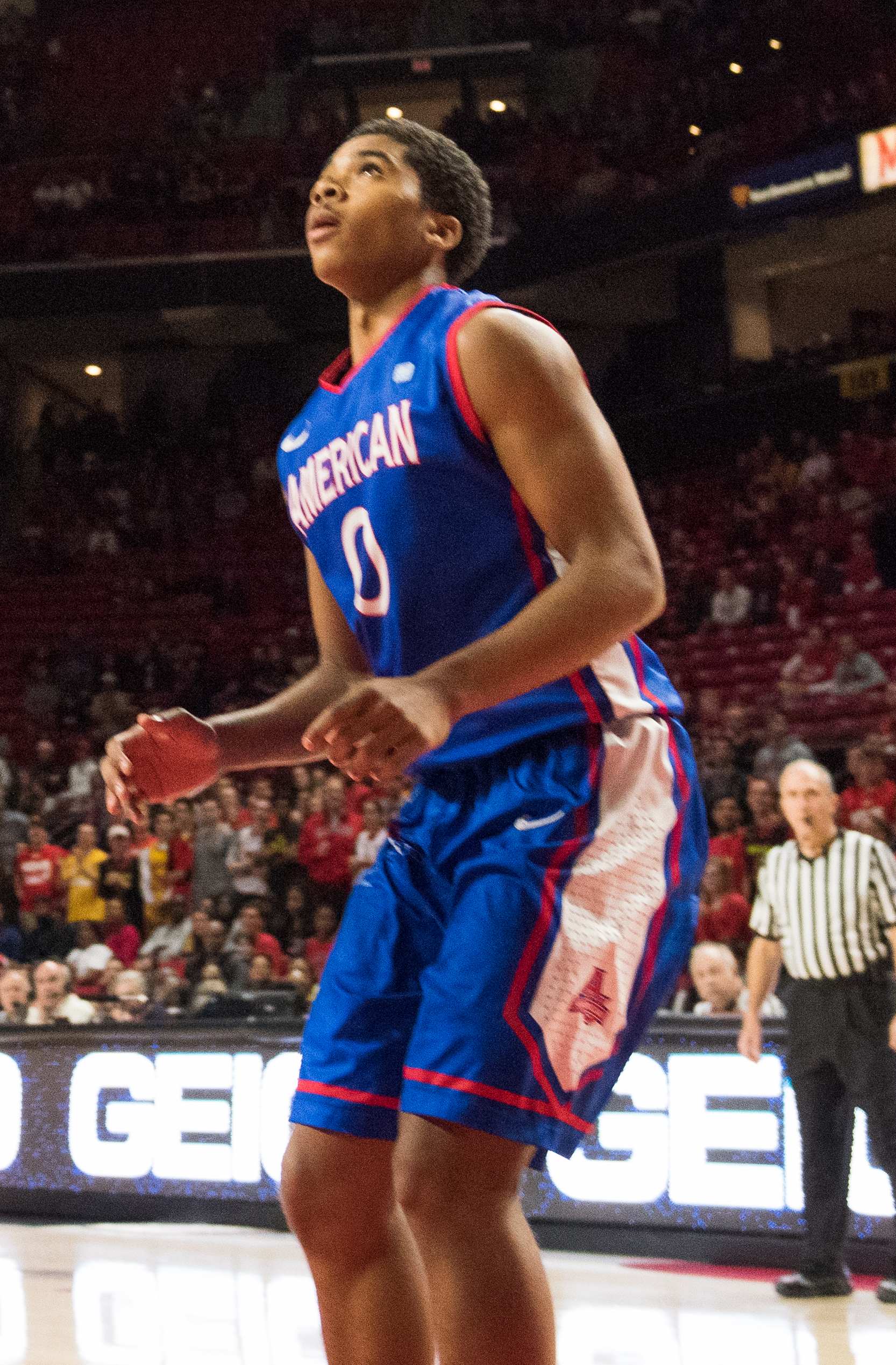

No. 0 – Calor de Cancún
- Position: Point guard
- League: LNBP

Personal information
- Born: September 9, 1998 (age 28) Pleasantville, New Jersey, U.S.
- Listed height: 6 ft 2 in (1.88 m)
- Listed weight: 190 lb (86 kg)

Career information
- High school: St. Augustine Prep (Richland, New Jersey)
- College: American (2016–2020)
- NBA draft: 2020: undrafted
- Playing career: 2020–present

Career history
- 2020–2021: Academics Heidelberg
- 2021–2022: SC Rasta Vechta
- 2022–2023: Sheffield Sharks
- 2023–2024: Laguna Sharks
- 2025: Antranik
- 2026: Frayles de Guasave
- 2026–present: El Calor de Cancún

Career highlights
- Patriot League Player of the Year (2020); 2× First-team All-Patriot League (2019, 2020); Second-team All-Patriot League (2018); Patriot League All-Rookie Team (2017)

Sa'eed Nelson (born September 9, 1998) is an American professional basketball player for El Calor de Cancún of the Liga Nacional de Baloncesto Profesional (LNBP). He played college basketball for the American Eagles, where he holds the all-time school scoring record with 2,116 career points.

== Early life ==
Nelson is the son of Jeffery Nelson and grew up in Pleasantville, New Jersey. His favorite basketball player growing up was Kobe Bryant. He mainly focused on playing football before high school, and he was a big Philadelphia Eagles fan.

Nelson attended St. Augustine Preparatory School, where he was coached by Paul Rodio. Nelson stood 5'5 as a freshman. As a junior, Nelson averaged 18.5 points and 7.8 assists per game and led the team to a 27–2 record. In his senior season, Nelson hit the clinching shot and free throw in a 58–55 win against Christian Brothers Academy in the Battle by the Bay. In the Non-Public A title game, he scored 30 points in a 83–50 win against Don Bosco Preparatory High School. Nelson was a two-time Press of Atlantic City player of the year and finished his career with 1,625 points, third highest in school history. Despite averaging 20 points per game as a senior, Nelson was not highly recruited, as most of his scholarship offers came from Patriot League schools, and he was rated a one-star recruit by ESPN. He committed to American on October 5, 2015.

== College career ==
In his freshman debut, Nelson scored 12 points in a 62–56 loss to Maryland. He posted back-to-back 24 point games against Wagner and St. Francis (Pennsylvania), averaging 14.9 points per game as a freshman. He was named to the Patriot League All-Rookie Team. As a sophomore, Nelson averaged 18.6 points, 5.1 assists and 3.6 rebounds per game, though the team finished 6-24. He was named to the Second Team All-Patriot League. Nelson averaged 19.8 points, 5.6 rebounds, 5.2 assists, and 2.4 steals per game as a junior. He was named to the First Team All-Patriot League. Nelson scored 28 points on February 15, 2020, in a 72–68 loss to Bucknell and broke the 2,000 point threshold. On February 26, Nelson scored 30 points in a 79–59 win against Lafayette and broke Russell Bowers' all-time scoring record at American. At the conclusion of the regular season, Nelson was named Patriot League Player of the Year. He averaged 18.5 points and 5.1 rebounds per game as a senior.

== Professional career ==
On August 26, 2020, Nelson signed his first professional contract with Academics Heidelberg of the ProA. He averaged 12.9 points, 5.0 assists, 3.7 rebounds, and 1.4 steals per game.

On September 5, 2021, Nelson signed with Rapla KK of the Latvian-Estonian Basketball League.

On December 28, 2021, he has signed with SC Rasta Vechta of the German ProA.
