= Mark Nickens =

American basketball player

Personal information
- Born: April 8, 1959 (age 67) Washington, D.C., U.S.
- Listed height: 6 ft 5 in (1.96 m)
- Listed weight: 205 lb (93 kg)

Career information
- High school: Mackin (Washington, D.C.)
- College: TCU (1978–1979); American (1980–1983)
- NBA draft: 1983: 4th round, 88th overall pick
- Drafted by: Milwaukee Bucks
- Position: Shooting guard

Career highlights
- 2× AP Honorable mention All-American (1982, 1983); ECC Co-Player of the Year (1982); 2× First-team All-ECC (1982, 1983)
- Stats at Basketball Reference

Mark G. Nickens (born April 8, 1959) is an American former basketball player. In college, he competed for TCU and American. He was a two-time honorable mention All-American and the co-East Coast Conference Player of the Year in 1982.

== Playing career ==
Nickens grew up in Washington, D.C., and attended Mackin High School. In college, he spent his freshman season playing for TCU, appearing in 22 games while averaging 8.9 points per game. The fit was not right, so Nickens transferred to his home city's American University. He had to redshirt a season, then spent his final three years of eligibility playing for the Eagles. Nickens began as the sixth man, but due to an injury to star player Boo Bowers, Nickens was elevated to a starting role and never looked back. In his junior and senior seasons he was named first-team All-East Coast Conference (ECC). As a junior in 1981–82 he averaged 19.2 points, 5.0 rebounds, and 2.5 steals per game while leading American to a 21–9 overall record. Nickens shared the ECC Player of the Year honor with Temple's Granger Hall. Nickens was also named by the Associated Press an honorable mention All-American in both his junior and senior years.

After his collegiate career ended, Nickens was selected in the ensuing 1983 NBA draft by the Milwaukee Bucks in the fourth round (88th overall). He was waived in September prior to the start of the regular season and never appeared in an NBA game.
