= 2007–08 American Eagles men's basketball team =

American college basketball season

2007–08 American Eagles men's basketball

Patriot League tournament champions Patriot League Regular season champions

NCAA tournament, first round
- Conference: Patriot League
- Record: 21–12 (10–4 Patriot)
- Head coach: Jeff Jones (8th season)
- Home arena: Bender Arena

2007–08 Patriot League men's basketball standings
| | Conf. | | | | Overall |
| Team | W | | L | PCT | W | | L | PCT |
|---|---|---|---|---|---|---|---|---|
| American † | 10 | – | 4 | .714 | 21 | – | 12 | .636 |
| Navy | 9 | – | 5 | .643 | 16 | – | 14 | .533 |
| Colgate | 7 | – | 7 | .500 | 18 | – | 14 | .563 |
| Lehigh | 7 | – | 7 | .500 | 14 | – | 15 | .483 |
| Army | 6 | – | 8 | .429 | 14 | – | 16 | .467 |
| Lafayette | 6 | – | 8 | .429 | 15 | – | 15 | .500 |
| Bucknell | 6 | – | 8 | .429 | 12 | – | 19 | .387 |
| Holy Cross | 5 | – | 9 | .357 | 15 | – | 14 | .517 |
† 2008 Patriot League tournament winner

The 2007–08 American Eagles men's basketball team represented American University during the 2007–08 NCAA Division I men's basketball season. The Eagles, led by eighth year head coach Jeff Jones, played their home games at Bender Arena and were members of the Patriot League. They finished the season 21–12, 10–4 in Patriot League play to finish first in the conference regular season standings. They were champions of the Patriot League tournament to earn an automatic bid to the NCAA tournament – the first appearance in school history – where they lost in the first round to Tennessee.

== Roster ==
2007–08 American Eagles men's basketball team
Players
Coaches

| Pos. | # | Name | Height | Weight | Year | Hometown |
|---|---|---|---|---|---|---|
| G | 3 | Derrick Mercer | 5 ft 9 in (1.75 m) | 180 lb (82 kg) | Jr | Jersey City, New Jersey |
| G | 5 | Garrison Carr | 5 ft 11 in (1.8 m) | 170 lb (77 kg) | Jr | Bellevue, Washington |

Head coach

- Jeff Jones

Assistant coach(es)

Legend

- (C) Team captain
- (S) Suspended
- (I) Ineligible
- (W) Walk-on
- Injured
- Current redshirt

== Schedule and results ==
| Date time, TV | Rank^{#} | Opponent^{#} | Result | Record | Site (attendance) city, state |
Non-conference regular season
| Nov 10, 2007*; 7:00 pm | | at Saint Francis (PA) | W 75–68 | 1–0 | DeGol Arena (1,159); Loretto, Pennsylvania |
| Nov 13, 2007*; 7:00 pm, MASN | | at Loyola (MD) | L 67–71 | 1–1 | Reitz Arena (1,332); Baltimore, Maryland |
| Nov 15, 2007*; 8:00 pm | | Fairfield | L 52–60 | 1–2 | Bender Arena (1,484); Washington, D.C. |
| Nov 18, 2007*; 2:00 pm | | Stony Brook | W 64–56 | 2–2 | Bender Arena (841); Washington, D.C. |
| Nov 20, 2007*; 7:00 pm | | at Morgan State | L 54–62 | 2–3 | Hill Field House (892); Baltimore, Maryland |
| Nov 24, 2007*; 2:00 pm | | at NJIT | W 73–50 | 3–3 | Fleisher Center (801); Newark, New Jersey |
| Nov 26, 2007*; 7:00 pm | | at Mount St. Mary's | W 66–45 | 4–3 | Knott Arena (958); Emmitsburg, Maryland |
| Dec 1, 2007*; 2:00 pm | | UMBC | L 68–83 | 4–4 | Bender Arena (1,213); Washington, D.C. |
| Dec 4, 2007*; 7:30 pm | | Howard | W 66–54 | 5–4 | Bender Arena (1,136); Washington, D.C. |
| Dec 7, 2007*; 7:30 pm, MASN | | Jacksonville | W 52–50 | 6–4 | Bender Arena (2,041); Washington, D.C. |
| Dec 19, 2007*; 7:00 pm | | at Dayton | L 56–63 | 6–5 | University of Dayton Arena (12,508); Dayton, Ohio |
| Dec 22, 2007*; 4:00 pm, CSN | | at Maryland | W 67–59 | 7–5 | Comcast Center (17,950); College Park, Maryland |
| Dec 29, 2007*; 1:00 pm | | at No. 8 Georgetown | L 51–78 | 7–6 | Verizon Center (10,564); Washington, D.C. |
| Jan 4, 2008*; 7:00 pm | | at Brown | L 55–68 | 7–7 | Pizzitola Sports Center (937); Providence, Rhode Island |
| Jan 6, 2008*; 2:00 pm | | at Columbia | W 69–56 | 8–7 | Levien Gymnasium (526); New York, New York |
Patriot League Regular season
| Jan 12, 2008; 7:05 pm | | at Lehigh | W 71–54 | 9–7 (1–0) | Stabler Arena (1,368); Bethlehem, Pennsylvania |
| Jan 16, 2008; 7:00 pm | | at Bucknell | L 62–66 | 9–8 (1–1) | Sojka Pavilion (3,714); Lewisburg, Pennsylvania |
| Jan 19, 2008; 2:00 pm | | Colgate | W 65–57 | 10–8 (2–1) | Bender Arena (1,661); Washington, D.C. |
| Jan 23, 2008; 7:00 pm | | at Army | W 66–53 | 11–8 (3–1) | Christl Arena (483); West Point, New York |
| Jan 26, 2008; 2:00 pm | | Holy Cross | L 64–66 | 11–9 (3–2) | Bender Arena (3,994); Washington, D.C. |
| Jan 30, 2008; 7:30 pm | | Navy | L 66–77 | 11–10 (3–3) | Bender Arena (1,012); Washington, D.C. |
| Feb 2, 2008; 1:00 pm | | at Lafayette | W 87–76 | 12–10 (4–3) | Kirby Sports Center (2,748); Easton, Pennsylvania |
| Feb 6, 2008; 7:00 pm | | at Holy Cross | W 62–46 | 13–10 (5–3) | Hart Center (1,015); Worcester, Massachusetts |
| Feb 10, 2008; 12:00 pm, ESPNU | | Lehigh | W 82–74 | 14–10 (6–3) | Bender Arena (1,989); Washington, D.C. |
| Feb 13, 2008; 7:30 pm | | Bucknell | W 68–64 | 15–10 (7–3) | Bender Arena (1,858); Washington, D.C. |
| Feb 17, 2008; 12:02 pm, ESPNU | | at Colgate | W 68–60 | 16–10 (8–3) | Cotterell Court (530); Hamilton, New York |
| Feb 20, 2008; 7:30 pm | | Army | W 49–40 | 17–10 (9–3) | Bender Arena (1,332); Washington, D.C. |
| Feb 27, 2008; 7:00 pm | | at Navy | L 68–83 | 17–11 (9–4) | Alumni Hall (3,191); Annapolis, Maryland |
| Mar 1, 2008; 2:00 pm | | Lafayette | W 84–72 | 18–11 (10–4) | Bender Arena (2,432); Washington, D.C. |
Patriot League tournament
| Mar 5, 2008*; 7:30 pm | | Holy Cross; Quarterfinals | W 62–60 | 19–11 | Bender Arena (1,865); Washington, D.C. |
| Mar 9, 2008*; 2:00 pm | | Army; Semifinals | W 72–60 | 20–11 | Bender Arena (1,965); Washington, D.C. |
| Mar 14, 2008*; 4:45 pm, ESPN2 | | Colgate; Championship Game | W 52–46 | 21–11 | Bender Arena (3,044); Washington, D.C. |
NCAA tournament
| Mar 21, 2008*; 12:15 pm, CBS | (15 E) | vs. (2 E) No. 5 Tennessee; First Round | L 57–72 | 21–12 | Birmingham-Jefferson Civic Center (-); Birmingham, Alabama |
*Non-conference game. ^{#}Rankings from AP poll. (#) Tournament seedings in parentheses. E=East. All times are in Eastern Time.
