= 2008–09 American Eagles men's basketball team =

American college basketball season

2008–09 American Eagles men's basketball

Patriot League tournament champions Patriot League regular-season champions

NCAA tournament, first round
- Conference: Patriot League
- Record: 24–8 (13–1 Patriot)
- Head coach: Jeff Jones (9th season)
- Home arena: Bender Arena

2008–09 Patriot League men's basketball standings
	Conf.				Overall
Team	W		L	PCT	W		L	PCT
American †	13	–	1	.929	24	–	8	.750
Holy Cross	11	–	3	.786	18	–	14	.563
Navy	8	–	6	.571	19	–	11	.633
Army	6	–	8	.429	11	–	19	.367
Lehigh	5	–	9	.357	15	–	14	.517
Colgate	5	–	9	.357	10	–	20	.333
Bucknell	4	–	10	.286	7	–	23	.233
Lafayette	4	–	10	.286	8	–	22	.267
† 2009 Patriot League tournament winner

The 2008–09 American Eagles men's basketball team represented American University during the 2008–09 NCAA Division I men's basketball season. The Eagles, led by ninth-year head coach Jeff Jones, played their home games at Bender Arena and were members of the Patriot League. They finished the season 24–8, 13–1 in Patriot League play, to finish first in the conference regular season standings. They were champions of the Patriot League tournament to earn an automatic bid to the NCAA tournament—the school's second straight appearance—where they lost in the first round to Villanova.

== Roster ==
2008–09 American Eagles men's basketball team
Players
Coaches

Pos.	#	Name	Height	Weight	Year	Hometown
G	3	Derrick Mercer	5 ft 9 in (1.75 m)	180 lb (82 kg)	Sr	Jersey City, NJ
G	5	Garrison Carr	5 ft 11 in (1.8 m)	170 lb (77 kg)	Sr	Bellevue, WA

Head coach

- Jeff Jones

Assistant coach(es)

Legend

- (C) Team captain
- (S) Suspended
- (I) Ineligible
- (W) Walk-on
- Injured
- Current redshirt

== Schedule and results ==
Date time, TV	Rank^{#}	Opponent^{#}	Result	Record	Site (attendance) city, state
Non-conference regular season
November 14, 2008*; 7:00 p.m.		at No. 12 Oklahoma	L 54–83	0–1	Lloyd Noble Center (10,331); Norman, OK
November 17, 2008*; 7:30 p.m.		Saint Francis (PA)	W 67–46	1–1	Bender Arena (2,123); Washington, D.C.
November 19, 2008*; 7:00 p.m.		at Howard	W 65–63	2–1	Burr Gymnasium (576); Washington, D.C.
November 22, 2008*; 7:00 p.m.		at Jacksonville	W 75–67	3–1	Jacksonville Veterans Memorial Arena (1,492); Jacksonville, FL
November 25, 2008*; 7:00 p.m.		at Stony Brook	W 56–53	4–1	Pritchard Gymnasium (1,100); Stony Brook, NY
November 29, 2008*; 7:30 p.m.		at Fairfield	L 73–82	4–2	Arena at Harbor Yard (1,743); Fairfield, CT
December 1, 2008*; 9:00 p.m., MASN		Mount St. Mary's	L 52–57	4–3	Bender Arena (1,383); Washington, D.C.
December 6, 2008*; 1:00 p.m., MASN		at No. 20 Georgetown	L 49–73	4–4	Verizon Center (11,196); Washington, D.C.
December 17, 2008*; 7:30 p.m.		at George Washington	L 50–63	4–5	Charles E. Smith Center (2,653); Washington, D.C.
December 20, 2008*; 7:00 p.m., MASN		at UMBC	W 74–61	5–5	RAC Arena (1,470); Catonsville, MD
December 22, 2008*; 8:00 p.m., CSN		at Maryland	L 51–67	5–6	Comcast Center (15,838); College Park, MD
December 29, 2008*; 7:00 p.m.		at Manhattan	W 60–48	6–6	Draddy Gymnasium (2,107); New York, NY
January 2, 2009*; 7:30 p.m.		Brown	W 68–53	7–6	Bender Arena (1,012); Washington, D.C.
January 5, 2009*; 7:30 p.m.		Columbia	W 62–50	8–6	Bender Arena (923); Washington, D.C.
Patriot League Regular season
January 10, 2009; 2:00 p.m.		Lehigh	W 76–66 ^{OT}	9–6 (1–0)	Bender Arena (2,565); Washington, D.C.
January 14, 2009; 7:30 p.m.		Bucknell	W 69–55	10–6 (2–0)	Bender Arena (1,615); Washington, D.C.
January 17, 2009; 2:00 p.m., MASN		at Colgate	W 79–49	11–6 (3–0)	Cotterell Court (549); Hamilton, NY
January 24, 2009; 2:00 p.m., ESPNU		at Holy Cross	L 62–71	11–7 (3–1)	Hart Center (3,672); Worcester, MA
January 28, 2009; 7:00 p.m.		at Navy	W 68–67	12–7 (4–1)	Alumni Hall (2,675); Annapolis, MD
January 31, 2009*; 2:00 p.m.		Lafayette	W 78–65	13–7 (5–1)	Bender Arena (2,876); Washington, D.C.
February 4, 2009; 7:30 p.m.		Army	W 58–34	14–7 (6–1)	Bender Arena (1,292); Washington, D.C.
February 7, 2009; 7:00 p.m., MASN		at Lehigh	W 66–58	15–7 (7–1)	Stabler Arena (1,874); Bethlehem, PA
February 11, 2009; 7:00 p.m.		at Bucknell	W 52–50	16–7 (8–1)	Sojka Pavilion (1,938); Lewisburg, PA
February 14, 2009; 1:00 p.m., ESPNU		Colgate	W 69–44	17–7 (9–1)	Bender Arena (1,731); Washington, D.C.
February 18, 2009; 7:00 p.m.		at Army	W 58–36	18–7 (10–1)	Christl Arena (1,062); West Point, NY
February 21, 2009; 2:00 p.m.		Holy Cross	W 56–50	19–7 (11–1)	Bender Arena (3,018); Washington, D.C.
February 25, 2009; 8:00 p.m., CBS College Sports		Navy	W 64–59	20–7 (12–1)	Bender Arena (1,655); Washington, D.C.
February 28, 2009; 1:00 p.m., MASN		at Lafayette	W 75–68 ^{OT}	21–7 (13–1)	Kirby Sports Center (2,463); Easton, PA
Patriot League tournament
March 4, 2009*; 7:30 p.m.		Lafayette; Quarterfinals	W 78–56	22–7	Bender Arena (1,903); Washington, D.C.
March 8, 2009*; 12:00 p.m., CSN		Army; Semifinals	W 61–60	23–7	Bender Arena (1,846); Washington, D.C.
March 13, 2009*; 4:45 p.m., ESPN2		Holy Cross; Championship game	W 73–57	24–7	Bender Arena (3,123); Washington, D.C.
NCAA tournament
March 19, 2009*; 7:20 p.m.	(14 E)	vs. (3 E) No. 11 Villanova; First round	L 67–80	24–8	Wachovia Center (-); Philadelphia, PA
*Non-conference game. ^{#}Rankings from AP poll. (#) Tournament seedings in parentheses. E=East. All times are in Eastern. Source:
