= Tony Wroblicky =

American basketball player

No. 20 – Sheffield Sharks
- Position: Center
- League: British Basketball League German Basketball League Pro Basketball League

Personal information
- Born: July 12, 1992 (age 34) Harbor City
- Listed height: 6 ft 10 in (2.08 m)
- Listed weight: 240 lb (109 kg)

Career information
- High school: Loyola High School (Los Angeles)
- College: American (2010–2014)
- NBA draft: 2014: undrafted
- Playing career: 2014–present

Career history
- 2014–2015: Telekom Baskets Bonn
- 2015–2016: Kangoeroes Mechelen
- 2016–2018: Sheffield Sharks

Anthony Paul Wroblicky (born July 12, 1992) is an American professional basketball player who played for Telekom Baskets Bonn of the German Basketball League in the 2014–15 season.
