= Stephen Lumpkins =

American former professional basketball player

Personal information
- Born: April 16, 1990 (age 36) Redwood City, California, U.S.
- Listed height: 6 ft 8 in (2.03 m)
- Listed weight: 230 lb (104 kg)

Career information
- High school: Junípero Serra (San Mateo, California)
- College: American (2008–2013)
- NBA draft: 2013: undrafted
- Playing career: 2013–2015
- Position: Power forward / center

Career history
- 2013–2014: Aris Leeuwarden
- 2014–2015: Korikobrat
- 2015: Swans Gmunden

Career highlights
- 2× First-team All-WCAL (2007, 2008)

Stephen Lumpkins (born April 16, 1990) is an American former professional baseball and basketball player. Lumpkins stands 6 ft 8 in (203 cm) and plays the power forward and center position. Lumpkins played college basketball at American University in Washington, D.C. Lumpkins went undrafted in the 2013 NBA draft, so he decided to take his talents to Europe. Lumpkins signed his first pro contract with Aris Leeuwarden on August 7, 2013.

== Early life ==
Stephen Lumpkins was born on April 16, 1990, in Redwood City, California. He attended Junípero Serra High School in San Mateo, California, where he excelled in basketball and baseball.

== College career ==
Coming out of high school, Rivals.com rated Lumpkins as a two star recruit. He decided to commit to American University out of a handful of lower-level division one scholarship offers. Lumpkins enrolled at American University in Washington, D.C., to play for head coach Jeff Jones. During the 2009–10 basketball season, Lumpkins averaged 29.9 minutes per game to go with 13 points and 8.5 rebounds per game. During the 2010–11 basketball season, Lumpkins averaged 13.5 points per game along with 8 rebounds per game while playing 30 minutes per game. Following that season, Lumpkins was drafted by the Kansas City Royals in the 13th round of the MLB draft. He decided to forgo his senior year at American University and pursue his dream of playing professional baseball. In 2012–13, after one year, away from basketball, he returned to finish his career at American and graduated in 2013. In his career at American University, Lumpkins averaged 13.6 points, 8.7 rebounds, 1.3 blocks, and 1.1 assists in 31.1 minutes per game. "The Lump" was a fan favorite and even had a smattering of supporters called "the Lumpkin Patch."

== Professional baseball career ==
=== Drafts and minor leagues ===
Lumpkins was first drafted by the Pittsburgh Pirates in the 42nd round of the 2010 MLB Draft. Instead of joining the Pirates organization, Lumpkins decided to return to American University. In June 2011, Lumpkins was drafted in the 13th round by the Kansas City Royals. Lumpkins decided to forgo his senior year at American University and turn pro. In rookie ball in 2011, Lumpkins posted a 7.02 earned run average in 8 starts in 10 games with a farm team in the Royals organization. In 2012, Lumpkins appeared in 5 games, pitching 3.2 innings. He suffered a 19.64 ERA, giving up 11 walks to only 2 strike-outs. While playing professional baseball, Lumpkins made roughly $150,000 playing in the minor leagues. After his failure in professional baseball, Lumpkins re-enrolled at American University to continue playing basketball. He re-enrolled in the fall of 2012.

== Professional basketball career ==
=== Aris Leeuwarden (2013–2014) ===
Prior to playing for Aris Leeuwarden, Lumpkins played in the 34th annual San Francisco Pro-Am. Lumpkins played alongside NBA professionals Jeremy Lin and Diamon Simpson, who both spent time in the Houston Rockets organization. Lumpkins played in this event after going undrafted, prior to signing for Aris Leeuwarden in order to hone his basketball skills.

Lumpkins currently plays for Leeuwarden in the Netherlands. He averages 13.7 points per game while playing 30.6 minutes per game. On October 12, 2013, Lumpkins had a stellar game. In a close 97–98 loss to Rotterdam, Lumpkins scored 29 points on 11-13 shooting, while going 7-12 from the free throw line, to go with eight rebounds, four assists, and one steal. Lumpkins had his best rebounding performance against Swolle on November 16, 2013, recording five offensive rebounds and nine defensive rebounds, for a total of 14 rebounds in 35 minutes of playing time. Leeuwarden lost that game 60–86.

=== Korikobrat (2014–2015) ===
On August 31, 2014, Lumpkins signed with the Finnish Korisliiga team Korikobrat. In 13 games in Finland, he averaged 13.7 points and 7.2 rebounds per game.

=== Swans Gmunden (2014–2015) ===
In February 2015, Lumpkins signed with the Austrian ÖBL team Swans Gmunden.

== Honors ==
- Collegiate
  - Patriot League All-Freshman (2009)
  - Patriot League All-Tournament Team (2010)
  - 2x All-Patriot League Second Team (2011, 2013)
