= Brian Gilgeous =

American basketball player (born 1970)

Personal information
- Born: July 7, 1970 (age 56) Georgetown, Guyana
- Listed height: 6 ft 6 in (1.98 m)

Career information
- High school: Solebury School (Solebury Township, Pennsylvania)
- College: American (1989–1993)
- NBA draft: 1993: undrafted
- Playing career: 1993–1998
- Position: Small forward

Career highlights
- CAA Player of the Year (1993); 3× CAA All-Defensive Team (1991–1993); 3× First-team All-CAA (1991–1993); CAA All-Rookie Team (1990)

R. Brian Gilgeous (born July 7, 1970) is an American former professional basketball player for Angers BC 49 in France's Ligue Nationale de Basketball. A native of Brooklyn, New York, Gilgeous is best known for his college career at American University between 1989–90 and 1992–93. He led the team in scoring in each of his final three seasons as an Eagle, including a career-best 22.7 points per game as a senior. That year he was named the Colonial Athletic Association Player of the Year—the only player from American to be named as such—and through 2010–11 is just one of nine CAA men's basketball players to record 2,000+ points (2,013). He garnered three All-CAA First Team and All-Defensive Team selections as well.

Gilgeous' professional career spanned from 1993 until 1998, all overseas, and since then has worked in the Washington, D.C. area. He was inducted into the American University Athletic Hall of Fame and was part of the CAA's 25th Anniversary all-time team in 2009, which honored the greatest 25 men's basketball players in the conference's history through its first 25 years.
