= Colgate Raiders men's basketball statistical leaders =

The Colgate Raiders men's basketball statistical leaders are individual statistical leaders of the Colgate Raiders men's basketball program in various categories, including points, rebounds, assists, steals, and blocks. Within those areas, the lists identify single-game, single-season, and career leaders. The Raiders represent Colgate University in the NCAA's Patriot League.

Colgate began competing in intercollegiate basketball in 1900. However, the school's record book does not generally list records from before the 1950s, as records from before this period are often incomplete and inconsistent. Since scoring was much lower in this era, and teams played much fewer games during a typical season, it is likely that few or no players from this era would appear on these lists anyway.

The NCAA did not officially record assists as a stat until the 1983–84 season, and blocks and steals until the 1985–86 season, but Colgate's record books includes players in these stats before these seasons. These lists are updated through the end of the 2020–21 season.

== Scoring ==
Career
Rk	Player	Points	Seasons
1	Tucker Neale	2,075	1992–93 1993–94 1994–95
2	Will Rayman	1,836	2016–17 2017–18 2018–19 2019–20
3	Adonal Foyle	1,776	1994–95 1995–96 1996–97
4	Mike Ferrara	1,763	1978–79 1979–80 1980–81
5	Tucker Richardson	1,740	2018–19 2019–20 2020–21 2021–22 2022–23
6	Jordan Burns	1,666	2017–18 2018–19 2019–20 2020–21
7	Kyle Roemer	1,640	2004–05 2005–06 2007–08 2009–10
8	Pat Campolieta	1,616	1998–99 1999–00 2000–01 2001–02
9	Bob Duffy	1,591	1959–60 1960–61 1961–62
10	Jonathan Stone	1,511	1988–89 1989–90 1990–91 1991–92

Season
Rk	Player	Points	Season
1	Mike Ferrara	772	1980–81
2	Tucker Neale	771	1993–94
3	Tucker Neale	692	1994–95
4	Adonal Foyle	682	1996–97
5	Tucker Neale	612	1992–93
6	Bob Duffy	611	1961–62
7	Jack Nichols	591	1955–56
8	Adonal Foyle	585	1995–96
9	Mike Ferrara	572	1979–80
10	Rapolas Ivanauskas	558	2018–19

Single game
Rk	Player	Points	Season	Opponent
1	Jonathan Stone	52	1991–92	Brooklyn

== Rebounds ==
Career
Rk	Player	Rebounds	Seasons
1	Adonal Foyle	1,103	1994–95 1995–96 1996–97
2	Jack Nichols	1,082	1953–54 1954–55 1955–56 1956–57
3	Will Rayman	900	2016–17 2017–18 2018–19 2019–20
4	Keegan Records	862	2019–20 2020–21 2021–22 2022–23 2023–24
5	Darren Brown	830	1989–90 1990–91 1991–92 1992–93
6	Tucker Richardson	783	2018–19 2019–20 2020–21 2021–22 2022–23
7	Tom Cronin	755	1969–70 1970–71 1971–72
8	Jeff Woodward	714	2020–21 2021–22 2022–23 2023–24 2024–25
9	Ed Muntner	710	1962–63 1963–64 1964–65
10	Pat Campolieta	698	1998–99 1999–00 2000–01 2001–02

Season
Rk	Player	Rebounds	Season
1	Jack Nichols	422	1955–56
2	Jack Nichols	406	1956–57
3	Adonal Foyle	371	1994–95
4	Adonal Foyle	368	1996–97
5	Adonal Foyle	364	1995–96
6	Dick Osborn	332	1952–53
7	Milt Graham	318	1955–56
8	Darren Brown	317	1992–93
9	Tom Cronin	280	1971–72
10	Rapolas Ivanauskas	273	2018–19

Single game
Rk	Player	Rebounds	Season	Opponent
1	Jack Nichols	26	1956–57	Cornell
	Dick Osborn	26	1951–52	Yale

== Assists ==
Career
Rk	Player	Assists	Seasons
1	Tucker Richardson	626	2018–19 2019–20 2020–21 2021–22 2022–23
2	Jordan Burns	503	2017–18 2018–19 2019–20 2020–21
3	Hasan Brown	484	1990–91 1991–92 1992–93 1993–94
4	Austin Tillotson	422	2013–14 2014–15 2015–16
5	Mitch Rolls	365	2009–10 2010–11 2011–12 2012–13
6	Dave Hardy	355	1999–00 2000–01 2001–02 2002–03
7	Braeden Smith	351	2022–23 2023–24
	Jalen Cox	351	2023–24 2024–25 2025–26
9	Luke Roh	339	2011–12 2012–13 2013–14 2014–15
10	Sean O'Brien	335	2014–15 2015–16 2016–17 2017–18

Season
Rk	Player	Assists	Season
1	Tucker Richardson	198	2022–23
2	Braeden Smith	196	2023–24
3	Jordan Burns	171	2018–19
4	Jalen Cox	164	2025–26
5	Austin Tillotson	155	2015–16
	Braeden Smith	155	2022–23
7	Jordan Burns	154	2019–20
8	Hasan Brown	139	1993–94
9	Jimmy Maloney	136	1995–96
10	Austin Tillotson	134	2014–15

Single game
Rk	Player	Assists	Season	Opponent
1	Hasan Brown	13	1991–92	Cornell
	Mike Ferrara	13	1979–80	Rensselaer
	Joe Hoban	13	2010–11	Longwood

== Steals ==
Career
Rk	Player	Steals	Seasons
1	Tucker Richardson	221	2018–19 2019–20 2020–21 2021–22 2022–23
2	Pat Campolieta	193	1998–99 1999–00 2000–01 2001–02
3	Mike Boswell	186	1983–84 1984–85 1985–86 1986–87
4	Darren Brown	168	1989–90 1990–91 1991–92 1992–93
5	Bob Bamford	165	1982–83 1983–84 1984–85 1985–86 1986–87
6	Mike Ferrara	157	1978–79 1979–80 1980–81
7	Tad Brown	148	1982–83 1983–84 1984–85 1985–86
8	Jordan Burns	145	2017–18 2018–19 2019–20 2020–21
9	Hasan Brown	144	1990–91 1991–92 1992–93 1993–94
10	Mark Linebaugh	142	2000–01 2001–02 2002–03 2003–04

Season
Rk	Player	Steals	Season
1	Mike Ferrara	94	1980–81
2	Mike Boswell	76	1986–87
3	Tucker Richardson	73	2022–23
4	Pat Campolieta	66	1999–00
	Braeden Smith	66	2023–24
6	Darren Brown	65	1992–93
7	Austin Tillotson	58	2015–16
	Jordan Burns	58	2019–20
9	Mike Tilley	54	1998–99
	Tad Brown	54	1984–85

Single game
Rk	Player	Steals	Season	Opponent
1	Mike Boswell	10	1986–87	Niagara

== Blocks ==
Career
Rk	Player	Blocks	Seasons
1	Adonal Foyle	492	1994–95 1995–96 1996–97
2	Jason Whatley	215	1990–91 1991–92 1992–93 1993–94
3	Keegan Records	177	2019–20 2020–21 2021–22 2022–23 2023–24
4	Alex Woodhouse	166	2004–05 2006–07 2007–08 2008–09
5	Butch Hill	133	1978–79 1979–80 1980–81 1981–82
6	Jeff Woodward	130	2020–21 2021–22 2022–23 2023–24 2024–25
7	Doug Harley	128	1976–77 1977–78 1978–79 1979–80
8	Bob Bamford	122	1982–83 1983–84 1984–85 1985–86 1986–87

Season
Rk	Player	Blocks	Season
1	Adonal Foyle	180	1996–97
2	Adonal Foyle	165	1995–96
3	Adonal Foyle	147	1994–95
4	Jason Whatley	77	1992–93
5	Jason Whatley	72	1993–94
6	Alex Woodhouse	64	2007–08
7	Alex Woodhouse	59	2008–09
8	Jason Whatley	58	1991–92
9	Keegan Records	54	2021–22
10	Butch Hill	51	1981–82

Single game
Rk	Player	Blocks	Season	Opponent
1	Adonal Foyle	12	1996–97	Navy
	Adonal Foyle	12	1996–97	Fairfield
