= List of Colgate Raiders men's basketball head coaches =

The following is a list of Colgate Raiders men's basketball head coaches. There have been 20 head coaches of the Raiders in their 123-season history.

Colgate's current head coach is Matt Langel. He was hired as the Raiders' head coach in April 2011, replacing Emmett Davis, who was fired after the 2010–11 season.

No.	Tenure	Coach	Years	Record	Pct.
1	1900–1913	Ellery Huntington Sr.	13	104–74	.584
2	1913–1919	Walt Hammond	6	65–42	.607
3	1919–1928	William Reid	9	133–55	.707
4	1928–1932	Lloyd Jordan	4	53–24	.688
5	1932–1935	Robert C. Hubbard	3	26–29	.473
6	1935–1939	John Galloway	4	37–32	.536
7	1939–1941	Paul Bixler	2	21–12	.636
8	1941–1949	Karl J. Lawrence	8	74–55	.574
9	1949–1962	Howard Hartman	13	137–146	.484
10	1962–1964	Bob Dewey	2	12–29	.293
11	1964–1967	Bob Duffy	3	25–43	.368
12	1967–1972	Ed Ashnault	5	65–59	.524
13	1972–1976	Bill Vesp	4	47–51	.480
14	1976–1982	Mike Griffin	6	61–94	.394
15	1982–1986	Tony Relvas	4	14–91	.133
16	1986–1989	Joe Baker	3	14–68	.171
17	1989–1997 (Note: Bruen died on December 19, 1997 of pancreatic cancer. Aiello was named interim coach for the remainder of the season.)	Jack Bruen	9	109–127	.462
18	1997–1998*	Paul Aiello	1	7–15	.318
19	1998–2011	Emmett Davis	13	165–212	.438
20	2011–present	Matt Langel	12	202–174	.537
Totals		20 coaches	123 seasons	1,371–1,432	.489
Records updated through end of 2022–23 season * - Denotes interim head coach. Source
