= Bob Dewey =

American basketball player, coach, and administrator (1920–1988)

Biographical details
- Born: October 24, 1920; Oswego, New York, U.S.
- Died: February 18, 1988 (aged 67); Rochester, New York, U.S.

Playing career
- 1942–1944: Colgate
- 1946–1947: Utica Olympics

Coaching career (HC unless noted)

Men's basketball
- 1947–1950: Irving Prep
- 1950–1955: Western Reserve
- 1955–1960: Colgate (freshmen)
- 1962–1964: Colgate

Baseball
- 1948–1950: Irving Prep
- 1951–1955: Western Reserve
- 1956–1960: Colgate (freshmen)

Administrative career (AD unless noted)
- 1960–1964: Colgate (asst. AD)
- 1966–1973: Rochester

Head coaching record
- Overall: 36–118 (.234) (basketball)

Robert James Dewey (October 24, 1920 – February 18, 1988) was an American basketball player, coach, and administrator who was the head coach at Western Reserve (1950–1955) and Colgate (1962–1964) and athletic director at the University of Rochester (1966–1973).

== Playing ==
Dewey was born in Oswego, New York and graduated from Oswego High School in 1940. He enrolled at Colgate University that fall, but his studies were interrupted by World War II. He served as an infantry platoon leader with the 3rd Marine Division in the Pacific Theater. He returned to Colgate in 1942 and played two seasons for the Raiders men's basketball team. He was the team's captain and leading scorer during the 1942–43 season. He teamed with fellow Marine Bobby Wanzer the following season. He held the school's career scoring record until he was passed by Ernie Vandeweghe. He also played first base for the Colgate Raiders baseball team in 1943.

Dewey was a member of the Utica Olympics of the New York State Professional Basketball League during the 1946–47 season. He was the team's second leading scorer (behind Paul Anthony), averaging 13.7 points per game. Utica defeated the Cohoes Mastodons three games to none to win the league title.

== Coaching ==
Dewey began his coaching career in 1947 at Irving Preparatory School in Tarrytown, New York. He was the school's athletic director, football, baseball, and basketball coach, and taught Latin. In 1950, he became the head basketball and baseball coach at Western Reserve University. In his five seasons as basketball coach, Dewey accumulated a 24–89 record. In 1955, Dewey returned to Colgate as an associate professor of physical education and freshman basketball and baseball coach. In 1960, he was named assistant athletic director and Karl J. Lawrence took over freshman coaching duties. In 1962, Dewey returned to the sidelines as head coach of Colgate's varsity basketball team. The Raiders went 5–13 in 1962–63 and 7–16 in 1963–64. He resigned on October 15, 1964 to go into private business.

== Administration ==
In May 1965, Dewey was appointed director of student services at Bowling Green State University. In 1966, he was named athletic director at the University of Rochester. He was fired in 1973, but remained with the school as a professor of physical education. He retired in 1974 and remained in Rochester, New York until his death on February 18, 1988.
