= 1995–96 Canisius Golden Griffins men's basketball team =

American college basketball season

1995–96 Canisius Golden Griffins men's basketball
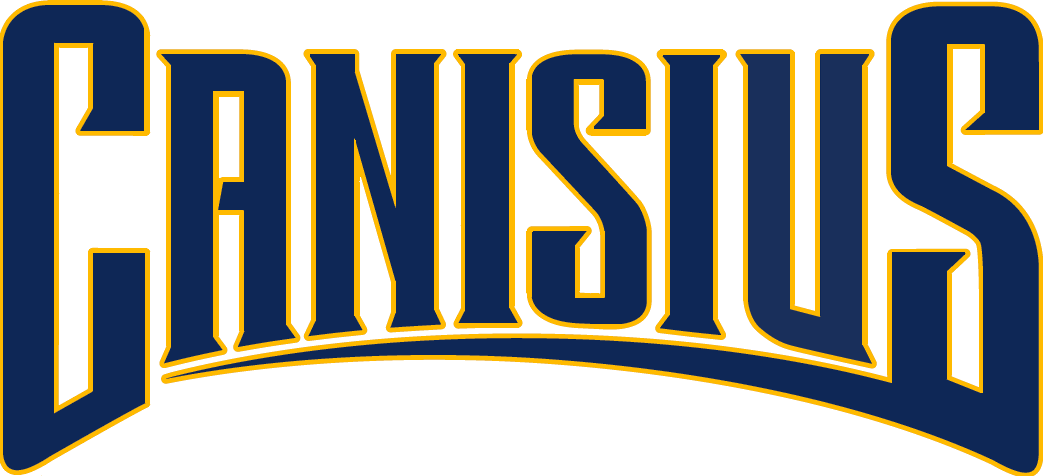

MAAC tournament champions

NCAA tournament
- Conference: Metro Atlantic Athletic Conference
- Record: 19–11 (7–7 MAAC)
- Head coach: John Beilein (4th season)
- Home arena: Koessler Athletic Center

1995–96 MAAC men's basketball standings
	Conf.				Overall
Team	W		L	PCT	W		L	PCT
Iona	10	–	4	.714	21	–	8	.724
Fairfield	10	–	4	.714	20	–	10	.667
Manhattan	9	–	5	.643	17	–	12	.586
Loyola (MD)	8	–	6	.571	12	–	15	.444
Canisius †	7	–	7	.500	19	–	11	.633
Niagara	6	–	8	.429	13	–	15	.464
Saint Peter's	5	–	9	.357	15	–	12	.556
Siena	1	–	13	.071	5	–	22	.185
† 1996 MAAC tournament winner

The 1995–96 Canisius Golden Griffins men's basketball team represented Canisius College during the 1995–96 NCAA Division I men's basketball season. The Golden Griffins, led by fourth year head coach John Beilein, played their home games at the Koessler Athletic Center and were members of the Metro Atlantic Athletic Conference. They finished the season 19–11, 7–7 in MAAC play to finish in a tie for fifth place. They won the MAAC tournament to receive the conference's automatic bid to the NCAA tournament – the school's first appearance since 1957. Playing as the No. 13 seed in the Midwest region, Canisius was beaten by No. 4 seed Utah, 72–43, in the opening round.

== Roster ==
1995–96 Canisius Golden Griffins men's basketball team
Players
Coaches

Pos.	#	Name	Height	Weight	Year	Hometown
G	5	Mickey Frazier	6 ft 3 in (1.91 m)	—	Sr
G		Javone Moore	6 ft 0 in (1.83 m)	—	Jr
F	33	Darrell Barley	6 ft 5 in (1.96 m)	—	Sr
C	55	Michael Meeks	6 ft 9 in (2.06 m)	235 lb (107 kg)	Sr

Head coach

- John Beilein

Assistant coach(es)

Legend

- (C) Team captain
- (S) Suspended
- (I) Ineligible
- (W) Walk-on
- Injured
- Current redshirt

Roster

== Schedule and results ==
Date time, TV	Rank^{#}	Opponent^{#}	Result	Record	Site (attendance) city, state
Regular season
Dec 8, 1995*		vs. Washington State	L 62–73	3–2	Carrier Dome; Syracuse, New York
Dec 9, 1995*		vs. Columbia	W 64–42	4–2	Carrier Dome; Syracuse, New York
Dec 18, 1995*		at Colgate	W 65–63	5–2	Cotterell Court; Hamilton, New York
Dec 23, 1995*		at Valparaiso	W 72–68	7–2	Athletics-Recreation Center; Valparaiso, Indiana
MAAC tournament
Mar 2, 1996*		vs. Loyola (MD); Quarterfinals	W 74–67	17–10	Times Union Center; Albany, New York
Mar 3, 1996*		vs. Iona; Semifinals	W 63–62	18–10	Times Union Center; Albany, New York
Mar 4, 1996*		vs. Fairfield; Championship game	W 52–46	19–10	Times Union Center; Albany, New York
NCAA tournament
Mar 14, 1996*	(13 MW)	vs. (4 MW) No. 12 Utah; First round	L 43–72	19–11	Reunion Arena; Dallas, Texas
*Non-conference game. ^{#}Rankings from AP Poll. (#) Tournament seedings in parentheses. All times are in Eastern Time.
