= List of Middle Tennessee Blue Raiders men's basketball head coaches =

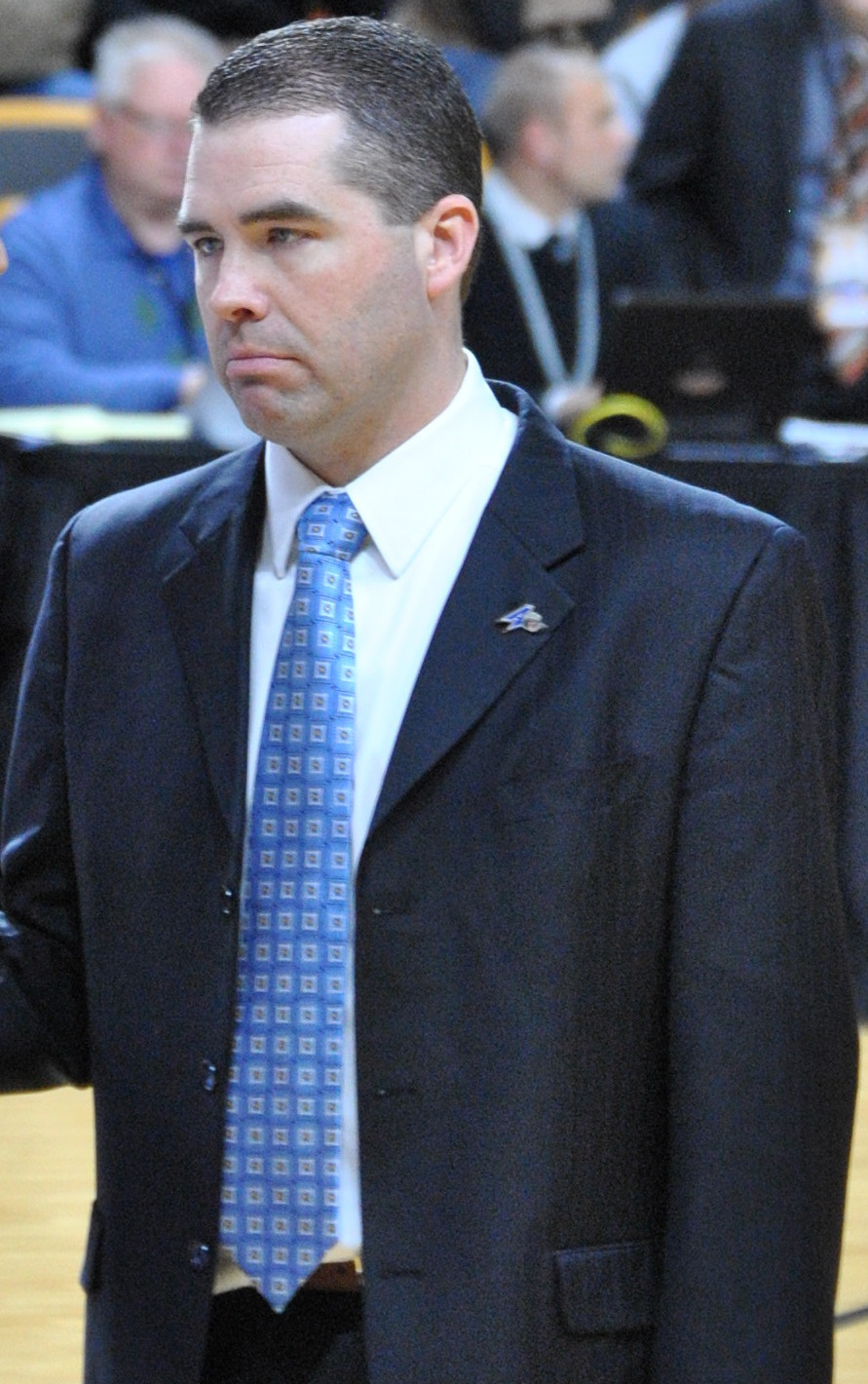
Nick McDevitt, the current head coach of the Middle Tennessee Blue Raiders.

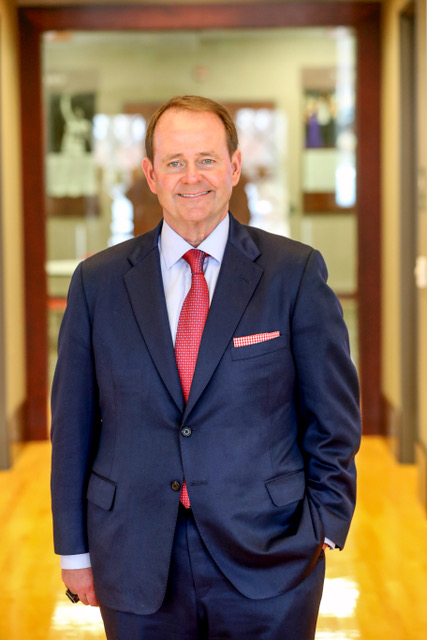
Kermit Davis, the winningest head coach in Blue Raiders men's basketball history.

The following is a list of Middle Tennessee Blue Raiders men's basketball head coaches. There have been 20 head coaches of the Blue Raiders in their 100-season history.

Middle Tennessee's current head coach is Nick McDevitt. He was hired as the Blue Raiders' head coach in March 2018, replacing Kermit Davis, who left to become the head coach at Ole Miss.

No.	Tenure	Coach	Years	Record	Pct.
1	1913–1924 (Note: Middle Tennessee did not field a team from 1915 until 1922 due to World War I.)	Alfred B. Miles	4	27–6	.818
2	1924–1926	Guy Stephenson	2	15–11	.577
3	1926–1933	Frank Faulkinberry	7	48–42	.533
4	1933–1935	E. M. Waller	2	7–13	.350
5	1935–1939	Johnny Floyd	4	17–33	.340
6	1939–1942	Elwin W. Midgett	3	25–35	.417
7	1945–1946	O. L. Freeman	1	4–2	.667
8	1946–1948	E. K. Patty	2	24–20	.545
9	1948–1949	Charles M. Murphy	1	11–12	.478
10	1949–1956	Charles Greer	7	76–103	.425
11	1956–1962	Ed Diddle Jr.	6	56–80	.412
12	1962–1965	Bill Stokes	3	26–42	.382
13	1965–1969	Ken Trickey	4	45–54	.455
14	1969–1979	Jimmy Earle	10	164–103	.614
15	1979–1984	Stan Simpson	5	71–66	.518
16	1984–1991	Bruce Stewart	7	141–76	.650
17	1991–1996	David Farrar	5	61–73	.455
18	1996–2002	Randy Wiel	6	84–90	.483
19	2002–2018	Kermit Davis	16	332–188	.638
20	2018–present	Nick McDevitt	7	105–118	.471
Totals		20 coaches	102 seasons	1,339–1,136	.541
Records updated through end of 2024–25 season Source
