= 1996 Patriot League men's basketball tournament =

- Classification: Division I
- Season: 1995–96
- Teams: 7
- Site: Hart Center; Worcester, Massachusetts
- Finals site: Cotterell Court; Hamilton, New York
- Champions: Colgate (2nd title)
- Winning coach: Jack Bruen (2nd title)
- MVP: Adonal Foyle (Colgate)

1995–96 Patriot League men's basketball standings
| | Conf. | | | | Overall |
| Team | W | | L | PCT | W | | L | PCT |
|---|---|---|---|---|---|---|---|---|
| Colgate † | 9 | – | 3 | .750 | 15 | – | 15 | .500 |
| Navy | 9 | – | 3 | .750 | 15 | – | 12 | .556 |
| Holy Cross | 8 | – | 4 | .667 | 16 | – | 13 | .552 |
| Bucknell | 8 | – | 4 | .667 | 17 | – | 11 | .607 |
| Lafayette | 4 | – | 8 | .333 | 7 | – | 20 | .259 |
| Lehigh | 2 | – | 10 | .167 | 4 | – | 23 | .148 |
| Army | 2 | – | 10 | .167 | 7 | – | 20 | .259 |
† 1996 Patriot League tournament winner

The 1996 Patriot League men's basketball tournament was played at Hart Center in Worcester, Massachusetts and Cotterell Court in Hamilton, New York after the conclusion of the 1995–96 regular season. Colgate defeated #3 seed Holy Cross, 74–65 in the championship game, to win its second Patriot League Tournament title. The Raiders earned an automatic bid to the 1996 NCAA tournament as #16 seed in the Southeast region.

== Format ==
All seven league members participated in the tournament, with teams seeded according to regular season conference record. Play began with the quarterfinal round. The top seed, Colgate, received a bye to the semifinal round.

== Bracket ==
Quarterfinals; March 2
4 | Bucknell | 56*
5 | Lafayette | 55
3 | Holy Cross | 81
6 | Lehigh | 66
2 | Navy | 58
7 | Army | 64

Semifinals; March 3
1 | Colgate | 67
5 | Bucknell | 61
3 | Holy Cross | 68
7 | Army | 65

Championship game March 6
1 | Colgate | 74
3 | Holy Cross | 65

* denotes overtime period
