= John Beilein =

American basketball coach (born 1953)

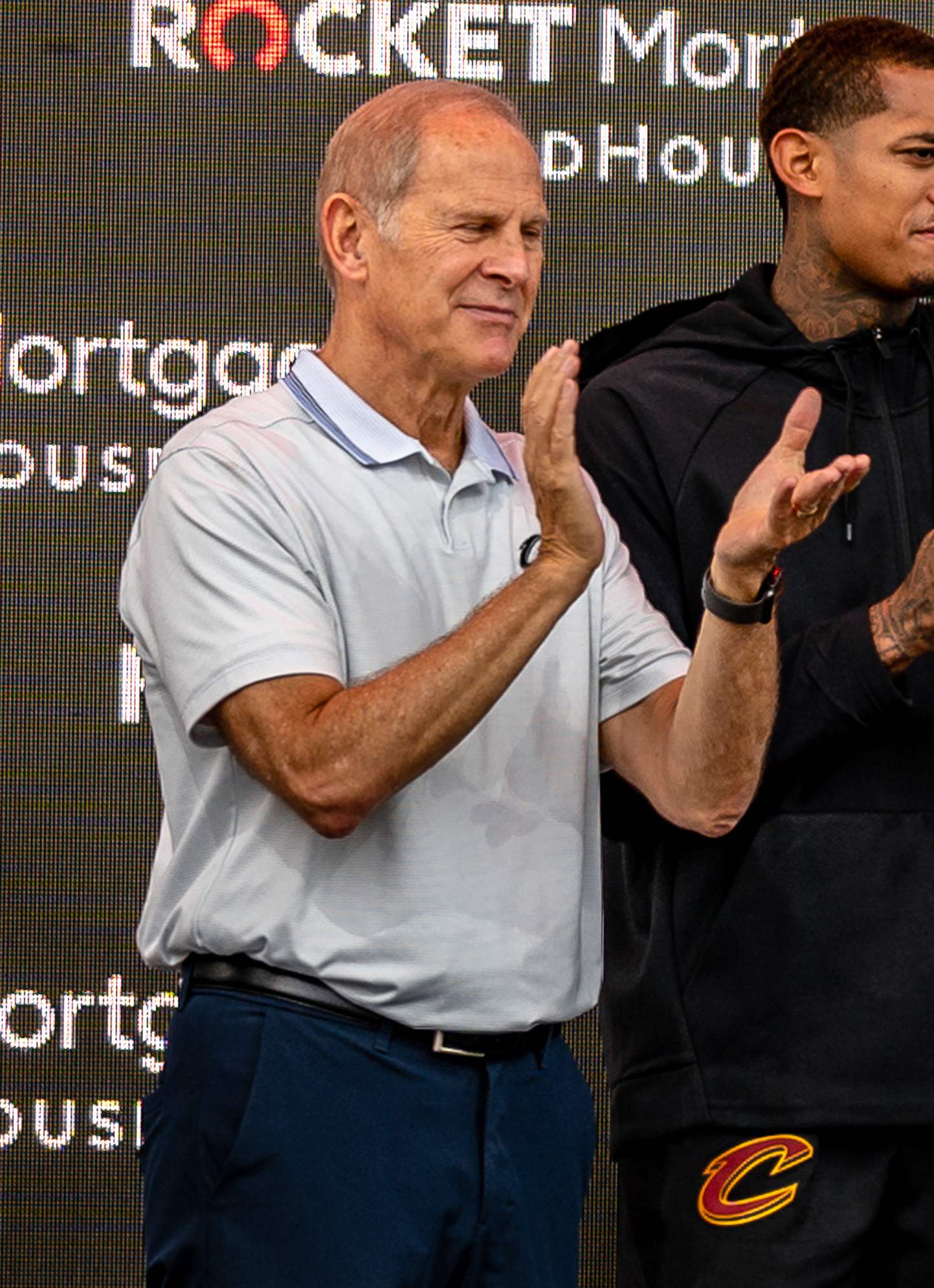
- Beilein with the Cleveland Cavaliers in 2019

Orlando Magic
- Position: Senior coaching consultant
- League: NBA

Personal information
- Born: February 5, 1953 (age 73) Burt, New York, U.S.

Career information
- High school: DeSales Catholic (Lockport, New York)
- College: Wheeling (1971–1975)
- Coaching career: 1975–present

Career history

Coaching
- 1975–1978: Newfane HS
- 1978–1982: Erie CC
- 1982–1983: Nazareth
- 1983–1992: Le Moyne
- 1992–1997: Canisius
- 1997–2002: Richmond
- 2002–2007: West Virginia
- 2007–2019: Michigan
- 2019–2020: Cleveland Cavaliers
- 2021–2023: Detroit Pistons (senior consultant)
- 2026–present: Orlando Magic (senior consultant)

Career highlights
- 2× NCAA Division I tournament Final Four (2013, 2018); NIT champion (2007); 2× Big Ten tournament champion (2017, 2018); 2× Big Ten regular season champion (2012, 2014); CAA regular season champion (2001); CAA tournament champion (1998); MAAC tournament champion (1996); MAAC regular season champion (1994); Coach Wooden "Keys to Life" Award (2019); CBS Sports National Coach of the Year (2018); Big Ten Coach of the Year (2014); CAA Coach of the Year (1998); MAAC Coach of the Year (1994); Records: Michigan career wins (278)
- Collegiate Basketball Hall of Fame

John Patrick Beilein (/ˈbiːlaɪn/ BEE-lyne; born February 5, 1953) is an American basketball coach, currently a senior coaching consultant for the Orlando Magic of the National Basketball Association (NBA). He was previously the senior advisor of player development for the Detroit Pistons (2021–2023) and the head coach of the Cleveland Cavaliers (2019–2020). Prior to the NBA, he was an NCAA Division I head coach at the University of Michigan (2007–2019), West Virginia University (2002–2007), University of Richmond (1997–2002), and Canisius University (1992–1997). As well as at Le Moyne College (1983–1992), Nazareth College (1982–1983), and Erie Community College (1978–1982). Beilein won 754 career games in the NCAA and 829 college games altogether, including the NJCAA. Beilein's overall career wins, including college and NBA, is 843 games.

Beilein was the only active collegiate coach to have achieved 20-win seasons at four different levels: NJCAA, NCAA Division III, NCAA Division II, and NCAA Division I. At the time, Beilein was one of only six active Division I coaches with 700 or more career wins at all levels. He has been recognized as conference coach of the year five times: in 1981 at Erie Community College, in 1988 at LeMoyne, in 1994 at Canisius, in 1998 at Richmond, and in 2014 at Michigan. In addition, Beilein was the seventh of only 10 coaches to have taken four different schools to the NCAA Division I tournament. He is known for his attention to details, focus on fundamentals, and knack for developing under-the-radar players. Beilein is also widely respected in collegiate sports as one of the cleanest and most rule-abiding coaches. In a poll conducted by CBS in 2017, Beilein was voted the cleanest coach in college basketball, gathering 26.6% of the votes vs. the next highest candidate's 10.5%.

Beilein's first Division I head coaching position was at Canisius, a hometown school of which he had been a fan. He turned around the school's losing program and helped it earn two National Invitation Tournament (NIT) bids and one NCAA tournament appearance in five years. Next, at Richmond, he reached the NCAA Tournament once and NIT twice in five years. He moved on to West Virginia, where his teams reached the second weekend of the NCAA Tournament twice, and also twice went to the NIT, including one championship. At Michigan, where he became the school's winningest coach, he won two Big Ten regular-season championships, two Big Ten tournament titles, and in the NCAA Tournament twice advanced to the national championship game. He has a 26–13 career record in the NCAA tournament, with championship game appearances in 2013 and 2018, as well as a 13–6 record in the NIT.

== Early life and education ==
Beilein was raised in Burt, New York. He is the eighth of nine children of a millworker and an apple farmer. His mother's cousins were the inspiration for Saving Private Ryan, and two of his uncles (Tom and Joe Niland) were lifelong basketball coaches in the Western New York area. Beilein attended DeSales High School in Lockport, New York. He went on to attend Wheeling College (now Wheeling University) where he competed on the school's basketball team from 1971 to 1975 and served as team captain during the 1974–75 season. He received a Bachelor of Arts degree in history in 1975. After graduating, Beilein returned to Western New York where he began his coaching career at Newfane High School in 1975. He remained there for three years. Beilein went on to earn a Master of Science degree in education from Niagara University in 1981.

== Early college coaching career ==
Beilein has never served as an assistant coach; he has held head-coaching positions throughout his career. He served as the coach of Erie Community College from 1978 to 1982, Western New York's Division III Nazareth College in Rochester, New York for the 1982–1983 school year, and Le Moyne College from 1983 to 1992. Le Moyne was a Division II contestant in the Mideast Collegiate Conference (MCC). Beilein first applied to coach Division I basketball at Canisius in 1987, but he was not hired. During his time at Le Moyne, he held annual coaching clinics that welcomed coaches and athletes. Beilein was named the 1988 MCC Coach of the Year, when his team finished as co-conference champions with a 21–5 regular season record and number 14 national ranking. The team tied with Gannon University with an 8–2 conference record. Although it was Beilein's third 20-win team at Le Moyne, he had never taken them to the NCAA tournament before. The team captured the conference post-season tournament after receiving a first round bye. As the number three seed, they faced the number one seeded California University of Pennsylvania in the NCAA Division II Eastern Regionals. They lost their first-round game to fall to a 23–6 record, but won the consolation game against Kutztown University of Pennsylvania.

The MCC disbanded following the 1990–1991 season. In Beilein's final season at Le Moyne, the team was an independent team unaffiliated with a conference. The team was scheduled to join the New England Collegiate Conference for the 1992–1993 season. After his first application for the job at Canisius, Beilein had tried to land other Division I jobs at schools such as Colgate University, where he had been a finalist in 1989. In 1992, he was finally hired to a Division I post at Canisius.

== NCAA Division I coaching career ==
=== Canisius (1992–1997) ===
During the 1991–92 season, Canisius compiled an 8–22 record prior to Beilein's arrival. In 1992, he arrived at Canisius College as head coach for the 1992–93 season, and was able for the first time to hire assistant coaches. A Western New York native, he had grown up a Canisius basketball fan because his uncle, Joe Niland, had been a former player and coach there. At Canisius—his first Division I coaching position—Beilein reached the NCAA Tournament once and the NIT twice in his five seasons.

In his first two seasons at Canisius, Beilein turned a last place 1991–92 squad into a 1993–94 team that recorded the first undefeated home schedule (15–0) in the school's modern era. The team entered the 1994 MAAC tournament on a 15-game winning streak, and Beilein earned Metro Atlantic Athletic Conference Coach of the Year. Beilein's number one seeded Canisius team lost in the second round semi-final contest against Loyola University and thus failed to make the 1994 NCAA tournament. Although Canisius failed to be invited to participate in the NCAA tournament, Canisius was invited, along with two other schools from the MAAC, to the NIT tournament, and it was matched up against a taller, more experienced Villanova team. The eventual 1994 NIT champion Villanova prevailed in a 103–79 victory over Canisius in the first round.

During the 1994–95 season, the Golden Griffins were led by the team's first MAAC Player of the Year, senior Craig Wise. In the first round of the MAAC tournament, a pair of future Michigan Wolverine coaches opposed each other when Canisius met Loyola, coached by Brian Ellerbe. Canisius won and reached the MAAC semi-final for the fifth time in six years. The team lost in the semis for the third straight season, and it continued its record of never having won the conference tournament. Canisius earned the team's first post-season victory in 32 years, in the 1995 NIT, against Seton Hall. A pair of subsequent wins enabled Canisius to earn a trip to the semifinals of the 1995 NIT at Madison Square Garden. Canisius lost in the semifinals against Virginia Tech by a 71–59 despite a school postseason record 32 points from Wise. Canisius lost the consolation game against Penn State. The three wins and two losses enabled Beilein to even up his NIT career record at 3–3.

In 1995–96, the team also was led by a MAAC Player of the Year, Darrell Barley. Beilein coached the 16–10 (7–7 MAAC) team to the conference tournament championship to earn a berth in the 1996 NCAA tournament despite the absence of the injured Barley for the tournament. Canisius earned a thirteen seed and matchup against the fourth-seeded Utah Utes in the team's first NCAA Tournament appearance since 1957. Utah defeated Canisius in the game, 72–43.

In Beilein's final season coaching Canisius, the Golden Griffins were the top defensive team in the MAAC. The team's season ended in the conference tournament finals. After the 1996–97 season, he interviewed with the University of Richmond.

Beilein was inducted into the Canisius Sports Hall of Fame on September 24, 2019, for his tenure and success with the program.

=== Richmond (1997–2002) ===
In 1997, Beilein became the coach of the Richmond Spiders. There, he compiled a 100–53 record in five seasons, recording a winning record each season, and again reached the NCAA tournament once, where his 14th-seeded team upset third-seeded and nationally ranked South Carolina. His teams also reached the NIT twice.

During the 1997–98 season, A third Beilein player was named conference player of the year in six seasons when Jarod Stevenson was named Colonial Athletic Association (CAA) Player of the Year. The 1997–98 Spiders posted its first winning season since 1993. The Spiders entered the 1998 CAA tournament as the third seed in the nine-team conference. The team won the tournament, earning the school a 1998 NCAA tournament selection, its first NCAA tournament berth since 1991. He won his fourth Coach of the Year award that season; this one was the Richmond Times-Dispatch Virginia Coach of the Year. Beilein was selected for the award over Charlie Woollum of William and Mary, who beat Beilein for the CAA coach of the year award. During the NCAA Tournament, Richmond, which was seeded 14th, upset the third-seeded South Carolina in the first round of the tournament. The Spiders lost their second game in the tournament to Washington. Beilein's career NCAA tournament record was 1–2.

Beilein relied on a nucleus that included two freshmen and two sophomores after two returning starters were removed from the team for disciplinary reason during the 1998–99 season. The team finished third in the CAA with a 15–11 (10–6 CAA) record. However, they were upset in the 1999 CAA conference tournament by sixth-seeded cross-town rival Virginia Commonwealth.

Richmond again earned the third seed in the conference tournament in the 1999–2000 season. In the 2000 CAA tournament, they ousted number-six Old Dominion and number-two James Madison. Then, with the CAA conference's automatic bid to the 2000 NCAA tournament at stake, Richmond lost to fourth-seeded UNC Wilmington in the championship game.

During the 2000–01 season, Richmond finished the regular season with a 21–6 record, finishing first in the CAA with a 12–4 record. The Spiders won ten of their final eleven games. However, since Richmond was going to change its athletic affiliation from the CAA to the Atlantic 10 the following season, it was ineligible for the 2001 CAA conference tournament. Only one team from the CAA had ever earned an at-large bid to the NCAA tournament. The Spiders played in the 2001 NIT, where they defeated West Virginia before losing to Dayton. With one win and one loss, Beilein stayed at .500 in the NIT (4–4 overall). At the end of the season, Beilein declined an offer to coach at Rutgers. The victory over West Virginia is credited as a large part of why Beilein was eventually hired at West Virginia.

The following year during the 2001–02 season, Richmond finished in second place of the West Division of the 12-team Atlantic 10 Conference to earn a first-round bye in the 2002 Atlantic 10 tournament. In the tournament, Richmond won its first two games to advance to the final, where it lost to Xavier. During the 2002 NIT, Richmond defeated Wagner, Montana State, and Minnesota before losing to Syracuse in the quarterfinals. This improved Beilein's record to 7–5 in the NIT.

=== West Virginia (2002–2007) ===
Dan Dakich was hired at West Virginia (WVU) of the Big East Conference and quit eight days later. In April 2002, Beilein accepted the head-coaching position at WVU. At WVU he posted a 104–60 record over five seasons. In the 2004–05 season, WVU went 24–11 and reached the "Elite Eight" (fourth round) of the NCAA tournament. The following year, WVU went 22–11 and reached the "Sweet Sixteen" (third round). In 2006–07, Beilein's Mountaineers, despite losing about 80% of their scoring from the previous season, went 27–9 and won the NIT championship.

Prior to 2009, the Big East tournament only included the top 12 teams. During the 2002–03 season, West Virginia qualified for the tournament in their final conference game of the season by beating Virginia Tech to secure 6th place in the western division. The team had improved from 8–20 to finish the regular season at 14–14 (5–11 Big East) under Beilein. The team lost in the first round of the 2003 Big East tournament to Providence by a 73–50 margin to end their season.

Following the 2003–04 regular season, West Virginia qualified for the 2004 Big East tournament as the number 10 seed. The team lost its first round match against Notre Dame team by a 65–64 margin on a three-point shot with 15 seconds remaining. The team's 15–13 record earned it an invitation to the 2004 NIT. In the first round of the tournament, the team traveled to play a 22–8 Kent State. Despite early foul trouble the team won 65–54 to advance to the second round. West Virginia defeated Rhode Island in the second game of the tournament by a 79–72 margin. The season ended with a 74–53 loss to Rutgers in the following game. Beilein's career record in the NIT tournament was 9–6 after this tournament.

In 2004–05, Beilein's team entered the 2005 Big East tournament with an 18–9 record as the eighth seed and as a team on the bubble for the 2005 NCAA tournament. The team won its opening-round game against number nine seed Providence 82–59, its second-round game against number one seed Boston College 78–72, and its third-round game against number four Villanova 78–72. West Virginia lost the conference tournament finals to Syracuse 68–59, but it earned a seven seed in the NCAA tournament against number ten seed Creighton of the Missouri Valley Conference. The loss gave Beilein his fifth loss in as many games against his mentor Syracuse coach Jim Boeheim, who had helped him acquire each of his first three Division I coaching positions. In the NCAA tournament, West Virginia beat Creighton 63–61 with a defensive stop and fast break dunk in the final five seconds. West Virginia then defeated the number-two seed Wake Forest led by Chris Paul in double overtime 111–105. In the Sweet Sixteen round, West Virginia defeated Bobby Knight's number six seeded Texas Tech 65–60. In the elite eight round, they lost 93–85 in overtime to Rick Pitino's number four seeded Louisville, who were led by Taquan Dean and Larry O'Bannon. With the three wins in 2005, Beilein raised his career NCAA Tournament record to 4–3.

During the 2005–06 season, West Virginia won its first eight Big East conference games and entered the top 10 in the 2005–06 national rankings in February. It was the first time West Virginia had ranked in the top ten in the Coaches' Poll, which had been created in 1993. They were the final unbeaten team in conference play. After the strong start, the team lost four of its next five games to fall to 9–4 in conference play. They won their next two games to clinch a first-round bye in the 2006 Big East tournament. With seemingly little to play for, they lost their regular-season finale to finish with a 20–9 (11–5 Big East) regular-season record. West Virginia lost its quarterfinal round game in the conference tournament to Pitt, and earned a number six seed in the 2006 NCAA tournament. West Virginia won its opening weekend games against number eleven seed Southern Illinois and the number fourteen seed Northwestern State Demons by 64–46 and 67–54 margins, respectively. West Virginia then lost in the Sweet Sixteen round to number-two seed Texas Longhorns in a wild finish that saw West Virginia erase a five-point deficit in the final 14 seconds only to lose the game on a buzzer-beater. The two wins helped Beilein raise his NCAA tournament record to 6–4.

During the 2006–07 season, WVU finished the regular season with a 21–8 (9–7 Big East) record to earn the number-seven seed in the 2007 Big East tournament. In the first round of the tournament, they defeated the number-10 seed Providence 92–79 making a Big East tournament record 17 three-point shots. They lost to the second-seeded Louisville Cardinals, 82–71, in double overtime. Their 22–9 record earned them a top seed in the 32-team 2007 NIT. As the number-one seed, West Virginia played its first three games at home, where it defeated the Delaware State Hornets 74–50, UMass team 90–77, and NC State 71–60. Before West Virginia started play in the semifinals in New York, rumors started that Beilein would take the Michigan job after the season. In the semifinal contest against Mississippi State, they won 63–62 on a last-minute shot by Darris Nichols after recovering from a 14-point second-half deficit. The day before the championship game, Beilein was announced as one of three finalists (along with Kevin Stallings and Chris Lowery) for the Michigan head-coaching job. In the championship game, WVU defeated Clemson 78–73. The five wins raised Beilein's NIT career record to 14–6.

=== Michigan (2007–2019) ===
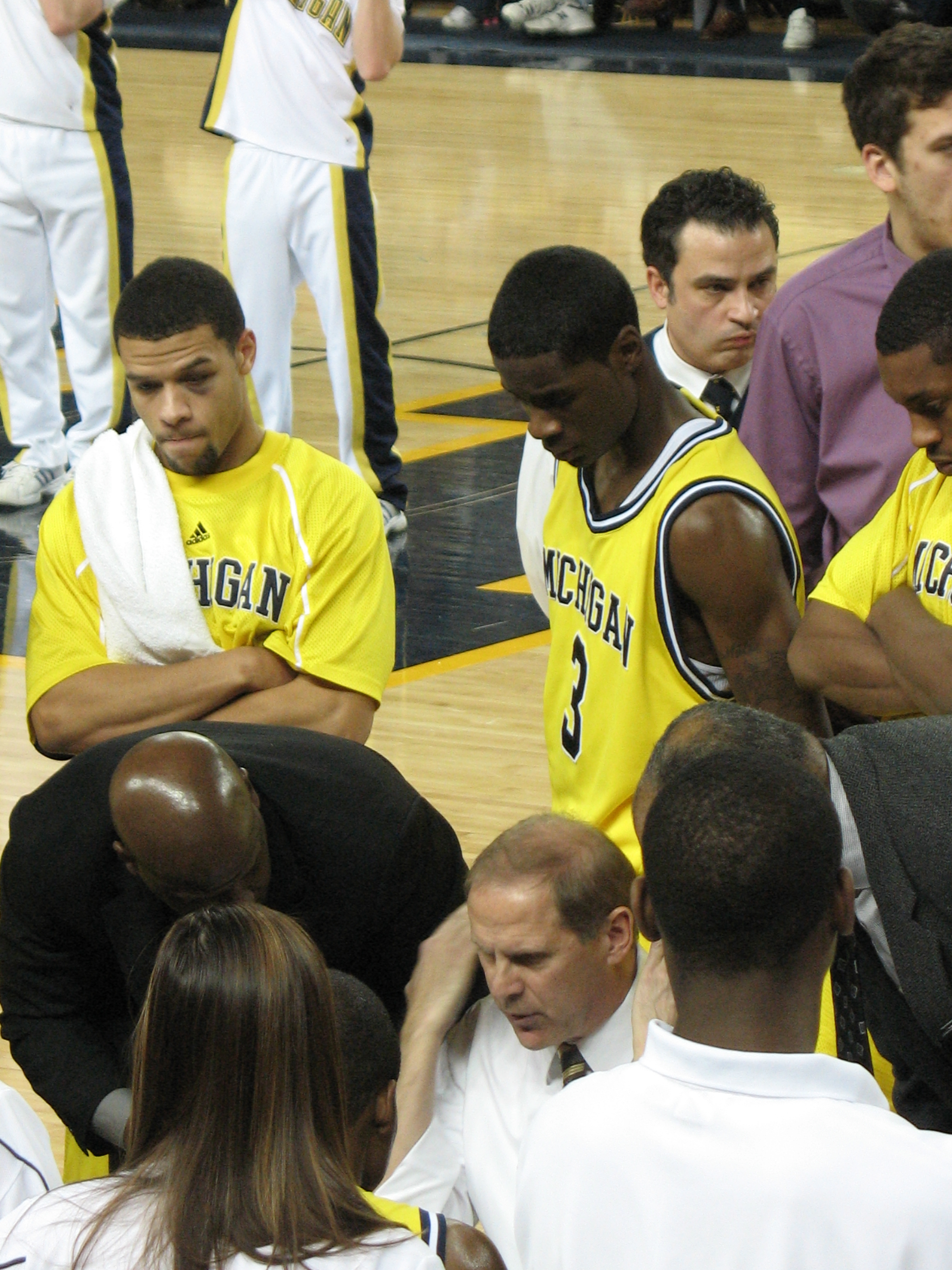
Beilein in the huddle with Manny Harris looking over his shoulder.

==== Rebuilding the program (2007–2010) ====
On April 3, 2007, the University of Michigan announced that it had hired Beilein to fill its coaching vacancy. He replaced Tommy Amaker, who was fired after failing to reach the NCAA Tournament in his six seasons. Beilein inherited a Big Ten Conference team that was in the final year of a scholarship reduction due to the involvement of former players in the Ed Martin scandal, in which NCAA rules had been violated. The team struggled to a 10–22 (5–13) record during the 2007–08 season.

Beilein's second Michigan team, the 2008–09 Wolverines took a significant step forward. On November 20, the unranked Wolverines upset #4-ranked UCLA, recording their first win over a top-five team in eleven years. On December 6, Michigan posted its second win of the season over a top-five opponent in a rematch against #4 ranked Duke. The Wolverines reached the top 25 in the national rankings on December 22, its first appearance since the February 6, 2006. On February 26, Michigan defeated the #16-ranked Purdue team 87–78, raising its record to 3–4 against ranked opponents on the season. At the conclusion of the 2008–09 Big Ten season, Michigan was given a seven seed in the 2009 Big Ten tournament. A win over Iowa in the Big Ten tournament on March 12 was the Wolverines' twentieth of the season. With that win, Beilein had achieved a 20-win season at seven different schools, including four at the Division I level (Canisius, Richmond, West Virginia, Michigan). Three days later, Beilein's Wolverines earned a bid to the 2009 NCAA tournament, the school's first appearance in 11 years. There, tenth-seeded Michigan defeated the seventh-seeded Clemson Tigers 62–59 before losing in the second round to Oklahoma 73–63.

==== First final run (2010–2014) ====
The 2010–11 team was not expected to be very successful, projected by the Detroit News to finish 10th in the 11-team conference. After starting the conference schedule with a 1–6 record the team won eight of its last 11 games, including two games against Michigan State (its first season sweep against them in 14 years), to finish tied for fourth in the conference with a 9–9 record. The victory at Michigan State was Michigan's first since 1997. In the Big Ten tournament, Michigan's win over Illinois gave Beilein his second 20-win season at Michigan, in his 1,000th game as a head coach. As a #8 seed in the 2011 NCAA tournament, Michigan defeated Tennessee 75–45, establishing two NCAA tournament records: the largest victory margin by an eight seed, and becoming the first team to ever win a tournament game without making a free throw. Michigan won by its third-largest margin in its NCAA tournament history (second-most if vacated games are excluded), and the game marked the ninth straight time that John Beilein led a team to victory in its first game of a postseason tournament (5 NCAA and 4 NIT). In the next round the Wolverines lost to #1-seeded Duke, 73–71, missing a potential game-tying shot in the final seconds.

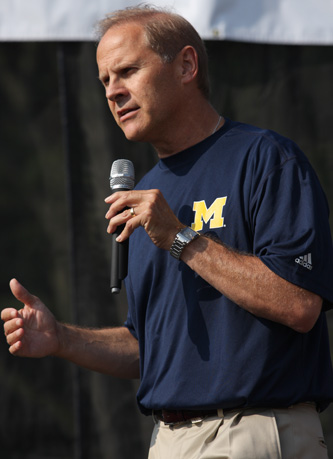
Beilein in 2008

The 2011–12 Wolverines began the season ranked in the top 25, and remained there all season. The team recorded a win over 9th-ranked Michigan State on January 17, 60–59. It was Beilein's third consecutive win over the Spartans and came nine days after Beilein recorded his first victory over Wisconsin, 59–41. On February 18, the Wolverines defeated another top-10 opponent, edging 6th-ranked Ohio State, 56–51. The win clinched Beilein's first winning record in Big Ten play. On March 1, Michigan won at Illinois for the first time since 1995, ending a 13-game losing streak in Champaign. The Wolverines finished 24–10 overall and 13–5 in Big Ten play, winning a share of the regular-season Big Ten championship for the first time since the 1985–86 team.

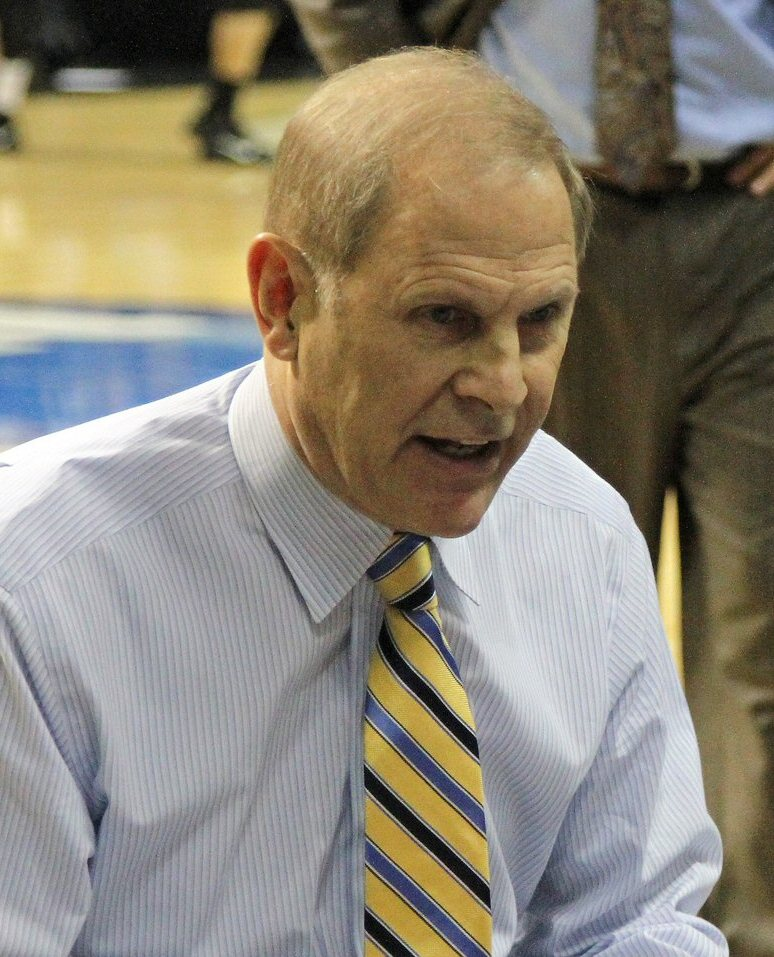
Beilein during the 2013 NCAA tournament

By helming the 2012–13 Wolverines, Beilein reached his sixth season with the same team for the first time. Beilein achieved several milestones with the 2012–13 Wolverines: 650th win as a college basketball head coach (December 4 vs. Western Michigan), 100th win as head coach at Michigan (December 8 vs. Arkansas), 400th Division I win as a head coach (January 9 vs. Nebraska) and his best career start (December 15 vs. West Virginia). The 400th win came on a night when Michigan achieved its 16th straight victory which tied the school record for best start. Michigan went on to record its first 19–1 start to a season in school history. On January 28, Michigan was ranked number one in the AP Poll with 51 of the 65 first place votes. It marked the first time Michigan ranked atop the AP Poll since the 1992–93 team did so on December 5, 1992. John Beilein was selected as an assistant coach for the 2013 World University Games. In the 2013 NCAA tournament, fourth-seeded Michigan defeated South Dakota State, 71–56. in its South Regional opening game, and in so doing the team matched Beilein's career high with 27 wins. Michigan then surpassed this record, and continued to advance, by defeating fifth-seeded Virginia Commonwealth, 78–53 and top-seeded Kansas, 87–85 before beating third-seeded Florida 79–59 to send Michigan to the Final Four for the first time since 1993. In the 2013 Final Four, the Wolverines defeated East region champion Syracuse, 61–56, to advance to the national championship game against Louisville, which they lost, 82–76. Despite the NCAA forcing Louisville to vacate all NCAA men's basketball wins from 2011 to 2015 Beilein declined in public statement that the University of Michigan would not claim the 2013 championship, stating, "We didn't win it all. We lost to a great team. If someone else wants to come and say 'hey, you won it all, you're the champion.' We'll take it," Beilein said Tuesday. "But I'm not going to declare that." During the following offseason, Bleacher Report named Beilein the most creative coach in college basketball. During the offseason, Beilein signed a second contract extension through the 2018–19 season, raising his annual salary to $2,450,000.

The 2013–14 team was ranked in the top 10 to start the season, but lost four non-conference games to fall out of the polls for the first time in over two seasons. Then, the team won three in a row against top-10 ranked conference opponents including a road victory over 3rd-ranked Wisconsin en route to a 10-game winning streak. Beilein led Michigan to a 15–3 conference record and won Michigan's first outright regular season Big Ten championship since 1986. The Wolverines earned a #2 seed in the NCAA tournament, where they lost in the Elite Eight to eventual runner-up Kentucky. Beilein was one of ten finalists for the USBWA's Henry Iba Award for Coach of the Year. He clinched his fourth career conference championship and second at Michigan on March 1 against Minnesota, and won the title outright three days later at Illinois. Following the regular season, Beilein was named Big Ten Coach of the Year by the media. On March 11 Beilein was named District V (OH, IN, IL, MI, MN, WI) Coach of the Year by the United States Basketball Writers Association (USBWA). Beilein was named one of five finalists for the Naismith College Coach of the Year and one of fifteen finalists for the Jim Phelan Award. On March 22 in Michigan's second game of the 2014 NCAA tournament, against Texas, Beilein earned his 700th career win to advance to the Sweet 16 of the NCAA tournament for the second consecutive season. Beilein led Michigan on to beat the #11 seed University of Tennessee before falling to #8 seed Kentucky 75–72 in the Elite Eight.

==== Second final run (2014–2019) ====
The 2014–15 team entered the season ranked number 23 in the Coaches' Poll and number 24 in the AP Poll. The team struggled in the preconference schedule, losing four games in a row in December. In January, the team lost Caris LeVert and Derrick Walton to injuries in January and after a 6–3 conference start finished 8–10 in conference and 16–16 overall (going 5–9 in games without LeVert and Walton). Prior to the 2015–16 season, Michigan extended Beilein's contract through the 2020–21 season.

During the Wolverines' 2016–17 season Beilein achieved several milestones: 750th career win as a head coach (December 22 vs. Furman), his 200th career win as head coach at Michigan (January 4 vs. Penn State), and his 500th career Division I win as a head coach (February 22 vs. Rutgers). Beilein became the second coach in program history to reach 200 wins with the Wolverines, joining Johnny Orr, who was the all-time leader with 209 until Beilein surpassed him with a win over Illinois on March 9, 2017, at the 2017 Big Ten tournament. Michigan went on to win its next three games to achieve its first Big Ten tournament title since its 1998 title that has been vacated. With wins over 10th-seeded Oklahoma State and 2nd-seeded Louisville, the Wolverines advanced to the Sweet 16 of the NCAA Tournament.

In June 2017, Beilein's title was renamed as the David and Meredith Kaplan Men's Basketball Head Coach at Michigan. UM alums David Kaplan and his wife, Meredith Kaplan, gave a $7.5 million gift to the University of Michigan Athletic Department for funding for the head basketball position and other items.

The 2017–18 Wolverines won the 2018 Big Ten Conference men's basketball tournament to claim their second consecutive Big Ten Conference men's basketball tournament championship. They became the first team to win consecutive tournament championships since Ohio State in 2010 and 2011. On March 24, Michigan defeated Florida State 58–54 in the West regional finals of the 2018 NCAA tournament. With the win, Michigan advanced to the Final Four for the eighth time in program history and set a single-season program record with its 32nd victory of the season, surpassing the previous record of 31 wins set by the 1992–93 and 2012–13 teams. After outlasting Loyola Chicago in the Final Four game, they fell to Villanova in the 2018 NCAA Division I Men's Basketball Championship Game.

Accolades came Beilein's way. Prior to the commencement of the Final Four, Beilein was named the CBSSports.com's Coach of the Year. Then during the offseason, Beilein was inducted into the Basketball Coaches Association of Michigan Hall of Fame.

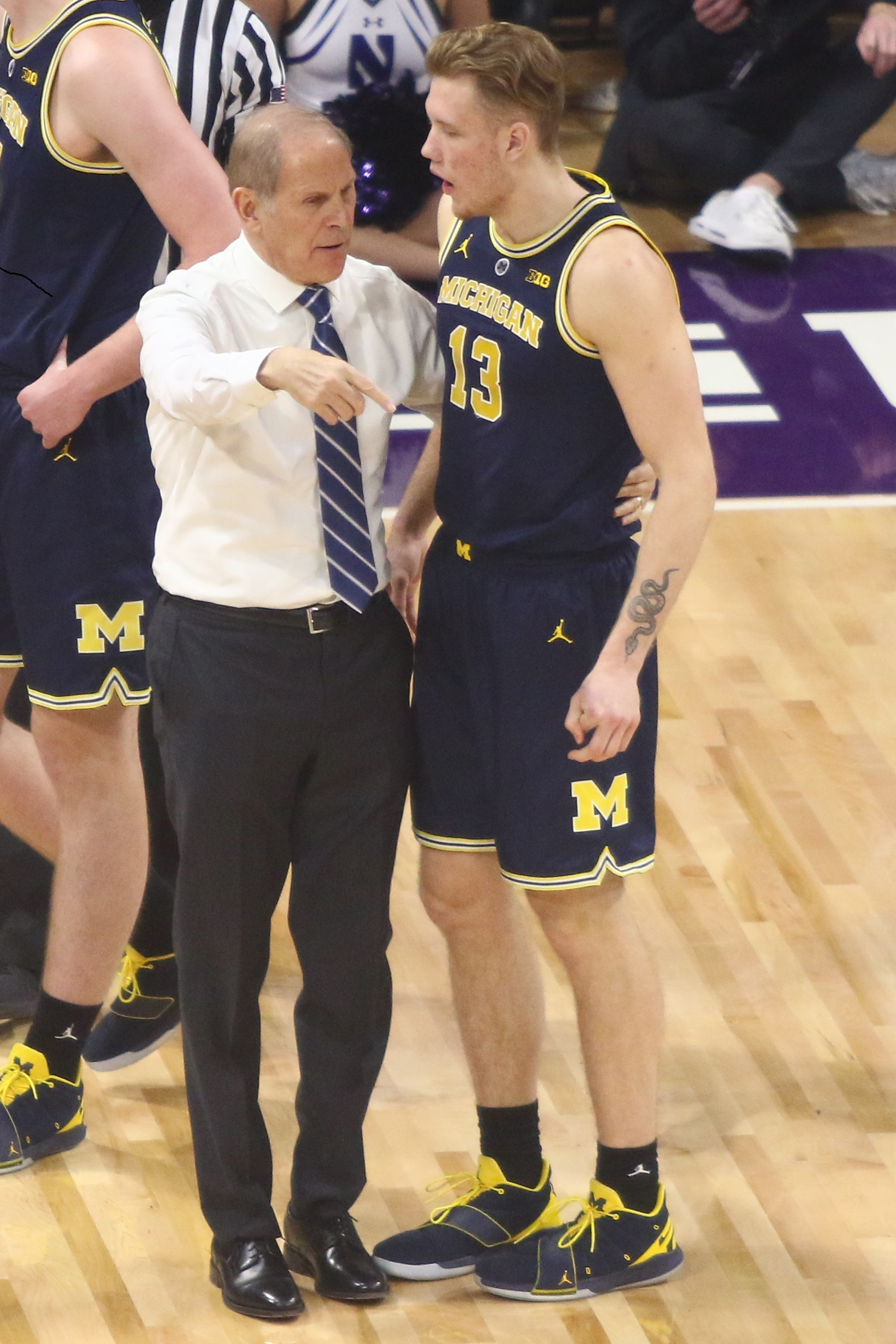
Beilein coaching 2019 Big Ten Conference Freshman of the Year Iggy Brazdeikis

Following their late season burst and strong tournament play, the 2018–19 Wolverines were ranked number 18 in the Coaches' Poll and number 19 in the AP Poll to start the season. With a victory over Norfolk State on November 6, 2018, Beilein earned his 800th career win as a head coach. In the third game of the season, Michigan defeated Villanova 73–46 in a rematch of the 2018 national championship game. Michigan went on to win its first 17 games of the season, which included wins over ranked North Carolina, Purdue, and Indiana teams. In doing so, the 2018–19 team set the school record for most wins to start a season (surpassing the 2012–13 and 1985–86 teams by a game) and tied the 1984–85 team for most consecutive wins altogether. Michigan finally lost on January 19 to Wisconsin but shared the distinction of being the last undefeated team in the country with Virginia. After finishing the regular season 28–6, the Wolverines defeated Montana and Florida in the first two rounds of the NCAA Tournament to clinch their second straight 30-win season (a first in school history) and third consecutive Sweet 16 appearance. Beilein finished his career at Michigan with a 278–150 record in 12 seasons as head coach, including two trips to the national title game, two Big Ten titles and two Big Ten tournament titles.

== NBA coaching career ==
On May 13, 2019, Beilein was named head coach of the Cleveland Cavaliers of the National Basketball Association (NBA), signing a five-year contract. Beilein was criticized for bringing his college game coaching style to the pros, including too much of an emphasis on fundamentals and an offense not suited to the NBA. During a film session, he apologized for stating that his team was no longer playing "like a bunch of thugs", stating that he had intended to say "slugs" but misspoke. During his tenure, Beilein hired Lindsay Gottlieb as the first woman coach to join the NBA from a college head coaching position.

On February 19, 2020, Beilein resigned as the head coach of the Cavaliers, with the team stating that he "will be reassigned to a different role within the organization". Beilein became the third first-year head coach since 1990, after Jerry Tarkanian of the Spurs (1992–1993) and Randy Ayers of the 76ers (2003–2004), to coach the season opener without completing the season.

On June 2, 2021, the Detroit Pistons appointed Beilein to be the senior advisor for player development. On August 17, 2026, Beilein was hired as the senior coaching consultant under new head coach Sean Sweeney of the Orlando Magic.

== Coaching style ==
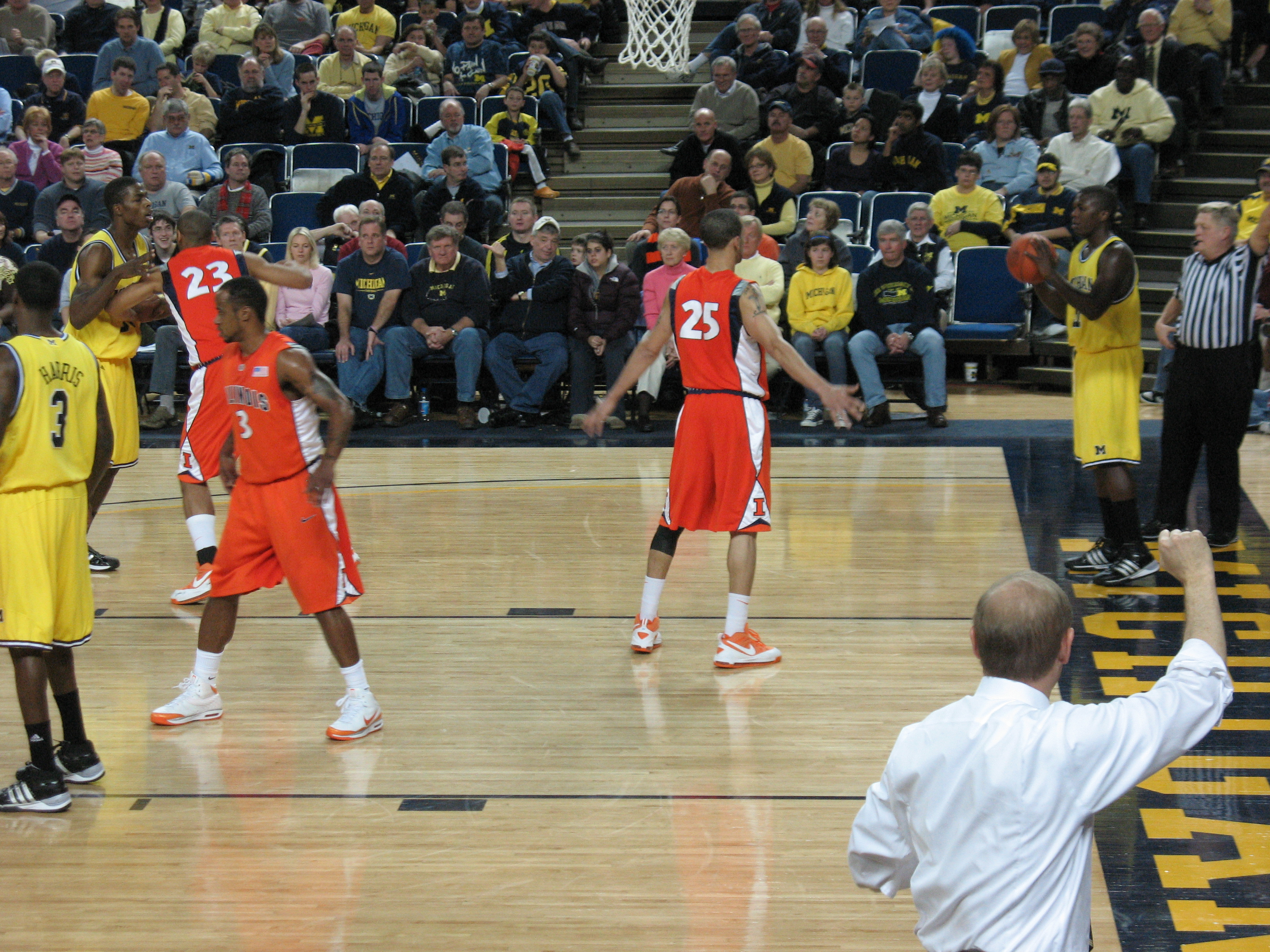
Beilein signals the play from the sideline.

Beilein modeled his offense from the Princeton system, which emphasizes constant motion, back-door cuts, picks on and off the ball, and precise shooting. The offense usually starts out with four players outside the three-point arc, and one player at the top of the key (though at times a post player may operate closer to the basket). From this formation, Beilein's teams not only try to open up space for players to cut to the basket, but also are known for their high number of three-point attempts. On defense, Beilein's West Virginia teams were known for regularly employing the 1–3–1 halfcourt zone defense, which is considered to be an unconventional zone defense – though his Michigan teams have more frequently employed man-to-man and 2-3 zone defenses.

== Personal life ==
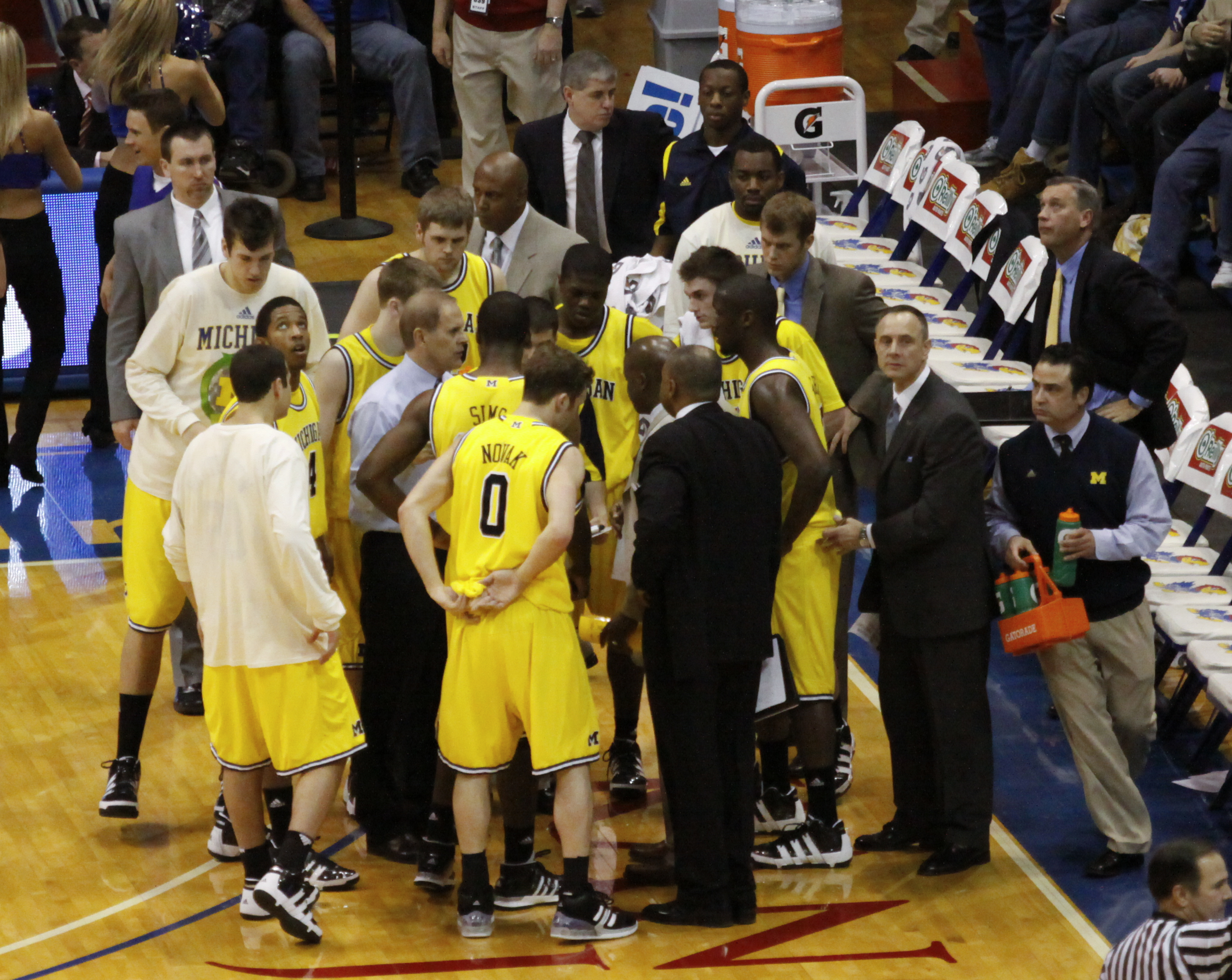
Beilein surrounded by the 2009–10 Michigan Wolverines

Beilein is married to Kathleen Beilein (née Griffin) since 1978. The Beileins have three sons (Patrick, who played for his father at WVU and followed in his father's footsteps as the head basketball coach at Le Moyne; Mark, a former football player at Richmond and WVU grad who currently works for Alro Steel; and Andrew, a Michigan grad who currently works for the Business Roundtable in Washington, D.C.). Patrick, who was the 2002 Virginia Independent Schools Division I Player of the Year, had intended to play at Richmond with his father, and instead went to West Virginia when his father moved there. Patrick was a 2008–2009 season graduate assistant coach at University of Michigan. He went on to hold posts as assistant coach at Dartmouth, Director of Men's Basketball Operations at Bradley University, and head coach of West Virginia Wesleyan College.

When Patrick was a highly recruited high school basketball player, John was restricted by NCAA rules from some normal behaviors regarding his son, such as giving his son's teammates a ride home from practice, talking with his son at a basketball camp or discussing his son's abilities with news media, because the interactions of college coaches with recruits are restricted. The relevant NCAA rules for recruiting (Bylaw article 13) are quite extensive. Beilein had to follow recruiting rules when visiting his son at a basketball camp. According to rule 13.12.1.3 coaches wishing to attend a camp as observers must comply with appropriate recruiting contact and evaluation periods. According to 13.02.3, a contact includes any face-to-face encounter between a prospective student-athlete ... and an institutional staff member or athletics representative during which any dialogue occurs in excess of an exchange of a greeting. In short, talking to coaches not employed by a camp is not allowed during the camp, which left Beilein unable to offer his son milk money.

In fall 2020, after coaching the Cleveland Cavaliers, Beilein taught a course at Michigan titled "Coaching as Leading and Leading as Coaching" in the School of Education. He repeated teaching the course in spring 2021. He also served as a college basketball analyst on the Big Ten Network beginning in 2021.

== Head coaching record ==
=== NJCAA ===
Record table
Season	Team	Overall	Conference	Standing	Postseason
Erie Kats (Western New York Athletic Conference) (1978–1982)
1978–79	Erie	20–15			
1979–80	Erie	17–8			
1980–81	Erie	21–8			
1981–82	Erie	17–12			
Erie:		75–43 (.636)			
Total:		75–43 (.636)			

=== NCAA ===
Record table
Season	Team	Overall	Conference	Standing	Postseason
Nazareth Golden Flyers (NCAA Division III independent) (1982–1983)
1982–83	Nazareth	20–6			
Nazareth:		20–6 (.769)			
Le Moyne Dolphins (Mideast Collegiate Conference) (1983–1991)
1983–84	Le Moyne	20–8	5–0	1st	
1984–85	Le Moyne	19–10	4–6	T–4th	
1985–86	Le Moyne	14–15	5–7	T–4th	
1986–87	Le Moyne	20–10	6–4	T–2nd	
1987–88	Le Moyne	24–6	8–2	T–1st	NCAA Division II Regional third place
1988–89	Le Moyne	15–12	6–6	5th	
1989–90	Le Moyne	17–12	5–7	T–5th	
1990–91	Le Moyne	19–10	6–4	T–3rd	
Le Moyne Dolphins (NCAA Division II independent) (1991–1992)
1991–92	Le Moyne	15–11			
Le Moyne:		163–94 (.634)	45–36 (.556)		
Canisius Golden Griffins (Metro Atlantic Athletic Conference) (1992–1997)
1992–93	Canisius	10–18	5–9	6th	
1993–94	Canisius	22–7	12–2	1st	NIT First Round
1994–95	Canisius	21–14	10–4	2nd	NIT Semifinal
1995–96	Canisius	19–11	7–7	5th	NCAA Division I Round of 64
1996–97	Canisius	17–12	10–4	T–2nd	
Canisius:		89–62 (.589)	44–26 (.629)		
Richmond Spiders (Colonial Athletic Association) (1997–2001)
1997–98	Richmond	23–8	12–4	3rd	NCAA Division I Round of 32
1998–99	Richmond	15–12	10–6	3rd	
1999–00	Richmond	18–12	11–5	3rd	
2000–01	Richmond	22–7	12–4	1st	NIT Second Round
Richmond Spiders (Atlantic 10 Conference) (2001–2002)
2001–02	Richmond	22–14	11–5	2nd	NIT Quarterfinal
Richmond:		100–53 (.654)	56–24 (.700)		
West Virginia Mountaineers (Big East Conference) (2002–2007)
2002–03	West Virginia	14–15	5–11	6th (West)	
2003–04	West Virginia	17–14	7–9	T–8th	NIT Second Round
2004–05	West Virginia	24–11	8–8	T–7th	NCAA Division I Elite Eight
2005–06	West Virginia	22–11	11–5	3rd	NCAA Division I Sweet 16
2006–07	West Virginia	27–9	9–7	T–7th	NIT champion
West Virginia:		104–60 (.634)	40–40 (.500)		
Michigan Wolverines (Big Ten Conference) (2007–2019)
2007–08	Michigan	10–22	5–13	T–9th	
2008–09	Michigan	21–14	9–9	T–7th	NCAA Division I Round of 32
2009–10	Michigan	15–17	7–11	T–7th	
2010–11	Michigan	21–14	9–9	T–4th	NCAA Division I Round of 32
2011–12	Michigan	24–10	13–5	T–1st	NCAA Division I Round of 64
2012–13	Michigan	31–8	12–6	T–4th	NCAA Division I Runner-up
2013–14	Michigan	28–9	15–3	1st	NCAA Division I Elite Eight
2014–15	Michigan	16–16	8–10	9th	
2015–16	Michigan	23–13	10–8	8th	NCAA Division I Round of 64
2016–17	Michigan	26–12	10–8	T–5th	NCAA Division I Sweet 16
2017–18	Michigan	33–8	13–5	T–4th	NCAA Division I Runner-up
2018–19	Michigan	30–7	15–5	3rd	NCAA Division I Sweet 16
Michigan:		278–150 (.650)	126–92 (.578)		
Total:		754–425 (.640)			
National champion Postseason invitational champion Conference regular season champion Conference regular season and conference tournament champion Division regular season champion Division regular season and conference tournament champion Conference tournament champion

=== NBA ===
Legend
Regular season	G	Games coached	W	Games won	L	Games lost	W–L %	Win–loss %
Playoffs	PG	Playoff games	PW	Playoff wins	PL	Playoff losses	PW–L %	Playoff win–loss %

Team	Year	G	W	L	W–L%	Finish	PG	PW	PL	PW–L%	Result
Cleveland	2019–20	54	14	40	.259	(resigned)	—	—	—	—	—
Career		54	14	40	.259		—	—	—	—	—

== See also ==
- List of college men's basketball coaches with 600 wins
- List of NCAA Division I Men's Final Four appearances by coach
