= List of 1963–64 NBA season transactions =

These are the list of personnel changes in the NBA from the 1963–64 NBA season.

== Events ==
=== July 15, 1963 ===
- The Philadelphia 76ers hired Dolph Schayes as head coach.

=== August 6, 1963 ===
- The San Francisco Warriors hired Alex Hannum as head coach.

=== August 14, 1963 ===
- The San Francisco Warriors traded Hubie White to the Philadelphia 76ers for John Windsor.

=== August 15, 1963 ===
- The Baltimore Bullets signed Mel Peterson as a free agent.

=== September 4, 1963 ===
- The San Francisco Warriors sold Willie Naulls to the Boston Celtics.

=== September 6, 1963 ===
- The Los Angeles Lakers claimed Don Nelson on waivers from the Chicago Zephyrs.

=== September 24, 1963 ===
- The Cincinnati Royals sold Hub Reed to the Los Angeles Lakers.

=== October 1, 1963 ===
- The Baltimore Bullets claimed Roger Strickland on waivers from the Los Angeles Lakers.

=== October 14, 1963 ===
- The Boston Celtics signed Larry Siegfried as a free agent.

=== October 16, 1963 ===
- The Philadelphia 76ers sold Tom Hoover to the New York Knicks.

=== October 18, 1963 ===
- The New York Knicks traded Richie Guerin to the St. Louis Hawks for cash and a 1964 2nd round draft pick (Howard Komives was later selected).

=== October 21, 1963 ===
- The Philadelphia 76ers sold Len Chappell to the New York Knicks.

=== October 28, 1963 ===
- The Detroit Pistons traded Kevin Loughery to the Baltimore Bullets for Larry Staverman.

=== October 29, 1963 ===
- The Baltimore Bullets traded Bill McGill to the New York Knicks for Paul Hogue and Gene Shue.

=== November ?, 1963 ===
- The St. Louis Hawks signed Bevo Nordmann as a free agent.

=== November 11, 1963 ===
- The St. Louis Hawks sold Bob Duffy to the New York Knicks.

=== November 12, 1963 ===
- The New York Knicks waived Bevo Nordmann.

=== December 16, 1963 ===
- In a 3-team trade, the Cincinnati Royals traded Bob Boozer to the New York Knicks; the Detroit Pistons traded Larry Staverman to the Cincinnati Royals; the Detroit Pistons traded Johnny Egan to the New York Knicks; and the New York Knicks traded Donnie Butcher and Bob Duffy to the Detroit Pistons.

=== April 16, 1964 ===
- The Detroit Pistons sold Darrall Imhoff to the Los Angeles Lakers.

=== May 1, 1964 ===
- The New York Knicks claimed Hub Reed on waivers from the Los Angeles Lakers.
- The New York Knicks sold Hub Reed to the Detroit Pistons. This completes the trade where New York obtained Johnny Egan from Detroit on December 11, 1963.

=== June 18, 1964 ===
- The Baltimore Bullets traded Terry Dischinger, Don Kojis and Rod Thorn to the Detroit Pistons for Bob Ferry, Bailey Howell, Les Hunter, Wali Jones and Don Ohl.

=== August 8, 1964 ===
- Slick Leonard resigns as head coach for Baltimore Bullets.
