= 1995 Patriot League men's basketball tournament =

- Classification: Division I
- Season: 1994–95
- Teams: 8
- Site: Christl Arena; West Point, New York
- Finals site: Cotterell Court; Hamilton, New York
- Champions: Colgate (1st title)
- Winning coach: Jack Bruen (1st title)
- MVP: Tucker Neale (Colgate)

1994–95 Patriot League men's basketball standings
	Conf.				Overall
Team	W		L	PCT	W		L	PCT
Colgate †	11	–	3	.786	17	–	13	.567
Bucknell	11	–	3	.786	13	–	14	.481
Navy	10	–	4	.714	20	–	9	.690
Holy Cross	9	–	5	.643	15	–	12	.556
Fordham	6	–	8	.429	11	–	17	.393
Lehigh	5	–	9	.357	11	–	16	.407
Army	4	–	10	.286	12	–	16	.429
Lafayette	0	–	14	.000	2	–	25	.074
† 1995 Patriot League tournament winner

The 1995 Patriot League men's basketball tournament was played at Christl Arena in West Point, New York and Cotterell Court in Hamilton, New York after the conclusion of the 1994–95 regular season. Colgate defeated #3 seed Navy, 68–63 in the championship game, to win its first Patriot League Tournament title. The Raiders earned an automatic bid to the 1995 NCAA tournament as #16 seed in the Midwest region.

== Format ==
All eight league members participated in the tournament, with teams seeded according to regular season conference record. Play began with the quarterfinal round.

== Bracket ==
Quarterfinals; March 4
1	Colgate	87
8	Lafayette	67
4	Holy Cross	65
5	Fordham	79
3	Navy	87
6	Lehigh	81
2	Bucknell	78
7	Army	94

Semifinals; March 5
1	Colgate	75
5	Fordham	68
3	Navy	70
7	Army	59

Championship game March 10
1	Colgate	68
3	Navy	63

* denotes overtime period
