= 1996 MAAC men's basketball tournament =

- Classification: Division I
- Season: 1995–96
- Teams: 8
- Site: Knickerbocker Arena; Albany, New York
- Champions: Canisius (1st title)
- Winning coach: John Beilein (1st title)
- MVP: Michael Meeks (Canisius)

1995–96 MAAC men's basketball standings
	Conf.				Overall
Team	W		L	PCT	W		L	PCT
Iona	10	–	4	.714	21	–	8	.724
Fairfield	10	–	4	.714	20	–	10	.667
Manhattan	9	–	5	.643	17	–	12	.586
Loyola (MD)	8	–	6	.571	12	–	15	.444
Canisius †	7	–	7	.500	19	–	11	.633
Niagara	6	–	8	.429	13	–	15	.464
Saint Peter's	5	–	9	.357	15	–	12	.556
Siena	1	–	13	.071	5	–	22	.185
† 1996 MAAC tournament winner

The 1996 MAAC men's basketball tournament was held March 2–4, 1996 at Knickerbocker Arena in Albany, New York.

Fifth-seeded Canisius defeated Fairfield in the championship game, 52–46, to win their first MAAC men's basketball tournament.

The Golden Griffins received an automatic bid to the 1996 NCAA tournament.

== Format ==
All eight of the conference's members participated in the tournament field. They were seeded based on regular season conference records.

== Bracket ==
Quarterfinals; Saturday, March 2
1	Iona	71
8	Siena	59
4	Loyola (MD)	67
5	Canisius	74
3	Manhattan	60
6	Niagara	62
2	Fairfield	67
7	Saint Peter's	62

Semifinals; Sunday, March 3
1	Iona	62
5	Canisius	63
6	Niagara	47
2	Fairfield	70

Championship; Monday, March 4
5	Canisius	52
2	Fairfield	46
