= Jack Bruen =

American basketball player and coach

Biographical details
- Born: March 25, 1949; New York City, U.S.
- Died: December 19, 1997 (aged 48); Hamilton, New York, U.S.

Playing career
- 1968–1972: Catholic University

Coaching career (HC unless noted)
- 1982–1989: Catholic University
- 1989–1997: Colgate

Head coaching record
- Overall: 219–199

Accomplishments and honors

Championships
- 2 Patriot League tournament (1995, 1996); 3 Patriot League regular season (1994–1996)

Awards
- 2× Patriot League Coach of the Year (1992, 1996)

John Francis Bruen (March 25, 1949 – December 19, 1997) was an American college basketball coach. He served as the head men's basketball coach at Catholic University of America from 1982 to 1989 and Colgate University from 1989 to 1997. Bruen led the Colgate Red Raiders to two NCAA Division I men's basketball tournament appearances before dying from pancreatic cancer at age 48.

== Playing career ==
Bruen played high school basketball at Power Memorial Academy, alongside Lew Alcindor. He played college basketball at Catholic University of America, where he graduated in 1972.

== Coaching career ==
Bruen landed his first college head coaching job at his alma mater, where he guided the Cardinals to a 110–72 record from 1982 to 1989, with his teams never falling below the .500 mark. During his time at Catholic, Bruen coached future NCAA Division I head coaches Mike Lonergan and Jimmy Patsos.

In 1989, Bruen took the job at Colgate University. It was there where he coached Adonal Foyle, a 12-year NBA player, and eighth overall pick by the Golden State Warriors in the 1997 NBA draft. Bruen guided the Red Raiders to consecutive NCAA Tournament appearances in 1995 and 1996, the first NCAA Tournament appearances in school history—and three Patriot League regular season championships.

After being diagnosed with cancer before the start of the 1997 season, Bruen underwent chemotherapy treatments, and hoped to coach for the entire season, only missing one game against St. John's on December 10. He returned to Colgate to and coached his final game against Marist College on December 13, 1997, an 80–69 win. He would die just six days later, amassing a record of 109–127 overall.

== Head coaching record ==
Record table
Season	Team	Overall	Conference	Standing	Postseason
Catholic University Cardinals (Old Dominion Athletic Conference) (1982–1989)
1982–83	Catholic University	13–12	N/A	N/A	
1983–84	Catholic University	14–14	N/A	N/A	
1984–85	Catholic University	13–12	N/A	N/A	
1985–86	Catholic University	19–8	N/A	N/A	
1986–87	Catholic University	15–10	N/A	N/A	
1987–88	Catholic University	19–8	N/A	N/A	
1988–89	Catholic University	18–8	N/A		
Catholic University:		110–72 (.604)	N/A		
Colgate Red Raiders (North Atlantic Conference) (1989–1990)
1989–90	Colgate	8–21	3–9	6th	
Colgate Red Raiders (Patriot League) (1990–1997)
1990–91	Colgate	5–23	2–10	6th	
1991–92	Colgate	14–14	7–7	5th	
1992–93	Colgate	18–10	9–5	4th	
1993–94	Colgate	17–12	9–5	T-1st	
1994–95	Colgate	17–13	11–3	1st	NCAA First Round
1995–96	Colgate	15–15	9–3	1st	NCAA First Round
1996–97	Colgate	12–16	8–4	3rd	
1997–98	Colgate	3–3^{‡}	N/A	N/A	
Colgate:		109–127 (.462)	55–37 (.598)	‡ Bruen died on December 20, 1997. Paul Aiello coached the team for the remainder of the season.	
Total:		219–199 (.524)			
National champion Postseason invitational champion Conference regular season champion Conference regular season and conference tournament champion Division regular season champion Division regular season and conference tournament champion Conference tournament champion
