= Mike Ferrara =

American basketball player

Personal information
- Born: August 25, 1958 (age 68) New York City, New York
- Listed height: 6 ft 4 in (1.93 m)
- Listed weight: 190 lb (86 kg)

Career information
- High school: Franklin (Franklin, New Jersey)
- College: Niagara (1976–1977); Colgate (1978–1981)
- NBA draft: 1981: 3rd round, 48th overall pick
- Drafted by: Washington Bullets
- Position: Shooting guard

Career highlights
- America East Player of the Year (1981); 2× First-team All-America East (1980, 1981); No. 44 retired by Colgate Raiders
- Stats at Basketball Reference

Michael James Ferrara (born August 25, 1958) is a retired American basketball player best known for his collegiate career. He was the America East Conference Player of the Year as a senior in 1980–81 while playing for Colgate University. After graduating, Ferrara was selected in the 1981 NBA draft by the Washington Bullets, due to a serious knee injury sustained in the preseason, he never played in the National Basketball Association.

Ferrara grew up in Franklin, New Jersey and starred at Franklin High School.

Ferrara began his career at Niagara University, where after one season he transferred because the head coach who recruited him, Frank Layden, left prior to the start of Ferrara's career. After sitting out a season as a transfer redshirt, Ferrara spent his final three seasons playing for Colgate University. He scored a then-school record 1,763 points (later broken in 1995) and still holds Colgate records for points in a season (772) and steals in a season (94). Ferrara finished as the second leading scorer in all of NCAA Division I in 1980–81 with a 28.6 points per game average and was named the conference's player of the year. His jersey number was retired by Colgate in 2005.
