= Bill Stokes =

American basketball coach (1929–2018)

Biographical details
- Born: April 16, 1929
- Died: April 25, 2018 (aged 89)

Playing career
- 1947–1951: Western Kentucky

Coaching career (HC unless noted)
- 1958–1962: Middle Tennessee (assistant)
- 1962–1965: Middle Tennessee

William Malcolm Stokes (April 16, 1929 – April 25, 2018) was an American college basketball coach.

Stokes was born in Earlington, Kentucky, the son of Frank Farmer Stokes and Frances Wyatt Stokes. He grew up in Earlington and worked in the coal mines in his youth. Stokes graduated from Earlington High School and enrolled at Western Kentucky University. When he was 18, his father died in a mining accident. After graduating from Western Kentucky, Stokes joined the Marines and became a lieutenant. He earned a master's degree and doctorate at George Peabody College of Vanderbilt University, then did some postgraduate work at Harvard University. Stokes taught a number of subjects, including administration, supervision, statistics, tests and measurements, health, physical education, recreation and athletics.

In 1958, Stokes became an assistant basketball coach at Middle Tennessee State under Ed Diddle Jr. Stokes became the head coach in 1962. He hired Ken Trickey as an assistant, who replaced him in 1965. Stokes came to Miami-Dade College in 1966 as athletic director and eventually became President at Wolfson Campus, Kendall Campus and North Campus.

In 1997, Stokes left Miami-Dade to join Lockheed Martin and afterwards Affiliated Computer Services as the project manager of the Welfare Reform Programs. He was a member of the Greater Miami Chamber of Commerce and United Way Community Development Committee. On April 25, 2018, Stokes died of Parkinson's disease. He is survived by his wife Roberta Boyce Stokes; children Deborah and James Norman; several grandchildren and great-grandchildren; and brothers Jim and Steve Blais.
