= 1995–96 Colgate Red Raiders men's basketball team =

American college basketball season

1995–96 Colgate Red Raiders men's basketball

Patriot League regular season co-champions Patriot League tournament champions

NCAA tournament, First Round
- Conference: Patriot League
- Record: 15–15 (9–3 Patriot)
- Head coach: Jack Bruen (7th season)
- Home arena: Cotterell Court

1995–96 Patriot League men's basketball standings
	Conf.				Overall
Team	W		L	PCT	W		L	PCT
Colgate †	9	–	3	.750	15	–	15	.500
Navy	9	–	3	.750	15	–	12	.556
Holy Cross	8	–	4	.667	16	–	13	.552
Bucknell	8	–	4	.667	17	–	11	.607
Lafayette	4	–	8	.333	7	–	20	.259
Lehigh	2	–	10	.167	4	–	23	.148
Army	2	–	10	.167	7	–	20	.259
† 1996 Patriot League tournament winner

The 1995–96 Colgate Red Raiders men's basketball team represented Colgate University during the 1995–96 NCAA Division I men's basketball season. The Raiders, led by 7th-year head coach Jack Bruen, played their home games at Cotterell Court in Hamilton, New York as members of the Patriot League. They finished the season 15–15, 9–3 to tie for first place. In the Patriot League tournament, they defeated Bucknell and Holy Cross to win the Patriot League tournament. As a result, they received the conference's automatic bid to the NCAA Tournament. Playing as No. 16 seed in the Southeast region, the Raiders played a tough game in the opening round against No. 1 seed Connecticut, 68–59.

== Roster ==
1995–96 Colgate Raiders men's basketball team
Players	Coaches
Pos. / # / Name / Height / Weight / Year / Previous school / Hometown; C / 31 / Adonal Foyle / 6 ft 10 in (2.08 m) / 240 lb (109 kg) / So	Head coach: Jack Bruen (Penn); Assistant coach(es) Legend: (C) Team captain; (S) Suspended; (I) Ineligible; (W) Walk-on; Injured; Current redshirt; Roster

== Schedule and results ==
Date time, TV	Rank^{#}	Opponent^{#}	Result	Record	Site (attendance) city, state
Non-conference regular season
Patriot League regular season
Patriot League tournament
Mar 3, 1996*		vs. Bucknell; Semifinals	W 67–61	14–14	Hart Center; Worcester, Massachusetts
Mar 6, 1996*		Holy Cross; Championship game	W 74–65	15–14	Cotterell Court; Hamilton, New York
NCAA tournament
Mar 14, 1996*	(16 SE)	vs. (1 SE) No. 3 Connecticut; First round	L 59–68	15–15	RCA Dome; Indianapolis, Indiana
*Non-conference game. ^{#}Rankings from AP Poll. (#) Tournament seedings in parentheses. SE=Southeast; Source. All times are in Eastern Time.
