= Newfane Senior High School =

Location
- One Panther Drive; Newfane, New York 14108; United States; 43.2870°N 78.6946°W

Information
- School type: Public school
- Established: 1915 (original building) 1968 (current Building)
- School district: Newfane Central School District
- Superintendent: Dr. Lisa Krueger
- Principal: Mr. Daniel Bedette
- Teaching staff: 36.80 (FTE)
- Grades: 9-12
- Enrollment: 388 (2023–2024)
- Student to teacher ratio: 10.54
- Colors: Blue, Silver, Black
- Slogan: Together We Can!
- Nickname: Panthers
- Website: www.newfane.wnyric.org/Page/1632

Newfane High School is a New York State public high school located in Newfane, New York, United States. The senior high school's mascot is the panther.
