= Karl J. Lawrence =

American football and basketball player and coach (1901–1992)

Biographical details
- Born: May 8, 1901; North Dakota, U.S.
- Died: January 11, 1992 (aged 90); Hamilton, New York, U.S.

Coaching career (HC unless noted)

Football
- 1930–1934: Midland
- 1935–1940: Allegheny
- ?: Colgate (assistant)

Basketball
- 1935–1941: Allegheny
- 1941–1949: Colgate

Head coaching record
- Overall: 23–49–7 (football); 118–96 (basketball)

Karl J. Lawrence (May 8, 1901 – January 11, 1992) was an American college football and college basketball player and coach. He served as the head football coach at Midland College–now known as Midland University–in Fremont, Nebraska from 1930 to 1934 and Allegheny College in Meadville, Pennsylvania from 1935 to 1940, compiling a career college football head coaching record of 23–49–7. Lawrence was also the head basketball coach at Allegheny from 1935 to 1941 and at Colgate University from 1941 to 1949, tallying a career college basketball head coaching mark of 118–96. Lawrence played football, basketball, and baseball at Concordia College in Moorhead, Minnesota, from which he graduated in 1926. He was inducted into the Concordia Athletics Hall of Fame in 1987.

== Coaching career ==
Lawrence was the head football coach at Allegheny College in Meadville, Pennsylvania. He held that position for six seasons, from 1935 until 1940. His coaching record at Allegheny was 11–27–4.

== Head coaching record ==
=== Football ===
Year	Team	Overall	Conference	Standing	Bowl/playoffs
Midland Warriors (Nebraska College Athletic Conference) (1930–1934)
1930	Midland	2–5–1	2–4	T–5th	
1931	Midland	1–5–2	1–2–2	5th	
1932	Midland	4–4	2–3	T–3rd	
1933	Midland	3–4	2–2	3rd	
1934	Midland	3–4	2–2	3rd	
Midland:		12–22–3	9–13–2		
Allegheny Gators (Independent) (1935–1940)
1935	Allegheny	2–6			
1936	Allegheny	1–3–2			
1937	Allegheny	5–2			
1938	Allegheny	3–4			
1939	Allegheny	0–5–2			
1940	Allegheny	0–7			
Allegheny:		11–27–4			
Total:		23–49–7			
