= 1994–95 Colgate Red Raiders men's basketball team =

American college basketball season

1994–95 Colgate Red Raiders men's basketball

Patriot League regular season champions Patriot League tournament champions

NCAA tournament, First round
- Conference: Patriot League
- Record: 17–13 (11–3 Patriot)
- Head coach: Jack Bruen (6th season)
- Home arena: Cotterell Court

1994–95 Patriot League men's basketball standings
	Conf.				Overall
Team	W		L	PCT	W		L	PCT
Colgate †	11	–	3	.786	17	–	13	.567
Bucknell	11	–	3	.786	13	–	14	.481
Navy	10	–	4	.714	20	–	9	.690
Holy Cross	9	–	5	.643	15	–	12	.556
Fordham	6	–	8	.429	11	–	17	.393
Lehigh	5	–	9	.357	11	–	16	.407
Army	4	–	10	.286	12	–	16	.429
Lafayette	0	–	14	.000	2	–	25	.074
† 1995 Patriot League tournament winner

The 1994–95 Colgate Red Raiders men's basketball team represented Colgate University during the 1994–95 NCAA Division I men's basketball season. The Raiders, led by 6th-year head coach Jack Bruen, played their home games at Cotterell Court in Hamilton, New York as members of the Patriot League. They finished the season 17–13, 11–3 to finish in first place. In the Patriot League tournament, they defeated Lafayette, Fordham, and Navy to win the Patriot League tournament. As a result, they received the conference's automatic bid to the NCAA Tournament. Playing as No. 16 seed in the West region, the Raiders were beaten by No. 1 seed Kansas, 82–68, in the opening round.

== Roster ==
1994–95 Colgate Raiders men's basketball team
Players	Coaches
Pos. / # / Name / Height / Weight / Year / Previous school / Hometown; C / 31 / Adonal Foyle / 6 ft 10 in (2.08 m) / 235 lb (107 kg) / Fr	Head coach: Jack Bruen (Penn); Assistant coach(es) Legend: (C) Team captain; (S) Suspended; (I) Ineligible; (W) Walk-on; Injured; Current redshirt; Roster

== Schedule and results ==
Date time, TV	Rank^{#}	Opponent^{#}	Result	Record	Site (attendance) city, state
Non-conference regular season
Nov 25, 1994*		at Stanford	L 70–82	0–1	Maples Pavilion; Stanford, California
Nov 26, 1994*		vs. Butler	L 74–84	0–2	Maples Pavilion; Palo Alto, California
Nov 29, 1994*		at No. 22 Syracuse	L 53–88	0–3	Carrier Dome; Syracuse, New York
Dec 2, 1994*		vs. Mississippi State	L 76–80	0–4	Dahlberg Arena; Missoula, Montana
Dec 3, 1994*		vs. Texas Southern	L 87–91 ^{OT}	0–5	Dahlberg Arena; Missoula, Montana
Dec 8, 1994*		at No. 11 Maryland	L 53–113	0–6	Cole Fieldhouse; College Park, Maryland
Dec 16, 1994*		Harvard	W 66–56	1–6	Cotterell Court; Hamilton, New York
Dec 27, 1994*		vs. Penn	L 58–93	1–7	Madison Square Garden; New York, New York
Dec 28, 1994*		vs. Manhattan	L 51–54	1–8	Madison Square Garden; New York, New York
Patriot League regular season
Patriot League tournament
NCAA tournament
Mar 16, 1995*	(16 MW)	vs. (1 MW) No. 5 Kansas; First round	L 68–82	17–13	University of Dayton Arena; Dayton, Ohio
*Non-conference game. ^{#}Rankings from AP Poll. (#) Tournament seedings in parentheses. MW=Midwest; Source. All times are in Eastern Time.
