= Tucker Neale =

American basketball player

Personal information
- Born: 1972 (age 53–54)
- Listed height: 6 ft 3 in (1.91 m)

Career information
- High school: Strongsville (Strongsville, Ohio)
- College: Colgate (1992–1995)
- NBA draft: 1995: undrafted
- Position: Shooting guard

Career highlights
- Patriot League Player of the Year (1994); Patriot League tournament MVP (1995); 2× First-team All-Patriot League (1994, 1995); Second-team All-Patriot League (1993); No. 20 retired by Colgate Raiders

Tucker F. Neale (born 1972) is an American former college basketball player. He played at Colgate University between 1992 and 1995, where in just three seasons he set the still-standing school record of 2,075 points. As a junior in 1994 he was named the Patriot League Player of the Year.

A native of Strongsville, Ohio, Neale did not play varsity basketball at Colgate until his sophomore season in 1992–93. The Raiders had won only a single digit number of games in 10 of the 11 seasons prior to Neale arriving. During his three-year tenure, he led the most successful stretch in school history, including their first-ever NCAA tournament appearance in 1995. With Neale's per-game season scoring averages of 21.9, 26.6, and 23.1, the Raiders finished 18–10, 17–12, and 17–13, respectively. They won their first regular season conference championship in his junior year, then repeated as champions his senior season. He was named to the Patriot League all-conference second team as a sophomore and a first team selection in his junior and senior years. In 1995, he was named the Patriot League tournament's MVP, one year after becoming Colgate's first-ever Patriot League Player of the Year. In just 87 career games Neale scored 2,075 points. Through 2020–21 he still owns the highest career scoring average in Patriot League history (23.9). Colgate later retired his jersey number 20, and in 2015 he was named to the Patriot League's 25th Anniversary Team.

After college he went undrafted in the 1995 NBA draft. Neale was invited to the Boston Celtics camp in fall 1995, the year of the NBA lockout. Instead, he opted to go to Europe and play professional basketball in Germany. He averaged 30 points per game and was named the player of the year. In 1996, he tried out for the Cleveland Cavaliers, but was cut in the just before the season started.

Since his playing career, Neale stays involved with the sport. He coaches AAU teams, is the creator of the popular Shot Coach (a device to help players learn how to shoot better), and manages OhioBasketball.com, the largest provider of basketball tournaments in the world. He lives in the Cleveland, Ohio area with his wife, Crystal, and their three children: Tre', Kennedi, and Trinidi.
