= Bob Duffy (basketball, born 1940) =

American basketball player and coach (1940–2026)

Personal information
- Born: September 26, 1940 Cold Spring, New York, U.S.
- Died: January 16, 2026 (aged 85) Wilton, Connecticut, U.S.
- Listed height: 6 ft 3 in (1.91 m)
- Listed weight: 185 lb (84 kg)

Career information
- High school: John Jay (Katonah, New York)
- College: Colgate (1959–1962)
- NBA draft: 1962: 2nd round, 10th overall pick
- Drafted by: St. Louis Hawks
- Playing career: 1962–1965
- Position: Point guard
- Number: 24, 9, 25

Career history

Playing
- 1962–1963: St. Louis Hawks
- 1963: New York Knicks
- 1963–1964: Detroit Pistons

Coaching
- 1964–1967: Colgate

Career highlights
- No. 24 retired by Colgate Raiders

Career NBA statistics
- Points: 400 (4.3 ppg)
- Rebounds: 104 (1.1 rpg)
- Assists: 167 (1.8 apg)
- Stats at NBA.com
- Stats at Basketball Reference

Robert Joseph Duffy (September 26, 1940 – January 16, 2026) was an American professional basketball player and college coach. He played college basketball at Colgate University, and was selected as the 10th overall pick in the 1962 NBA draft. Duffy graduated as the leading scorer in school history, and his record 1,591 points stood for 19 years. Duffy was also a Helms Athletic Foundation All-American in 1962.

In his three NBA seasons, Duffy averaged 4.3 points and 1.1 rebounds per game. He eventually became the head coach of his alma mater and compiled an overall record of 25–43 in three seasons. In his later life, he founded Duffy Broadcasting.

Duffy died in Wilton, Connecticut, on January 16, 2026, at the age of 85.

== Career playing statistics ==
Legend
GP	Games played	GS	Games started	MPG	Minutes per game
FG%	Field goal percentage	3P%	3-point field goal percentage	FT%	Free throw percentage
RPG	Rebounds per game	APG	Assists per game	SPG	Steals per game
BPG	Blocks per game	PPG	Points per game	**Bold**	Career high

=== NBA ===
==== Regular season ====
Year	Team	GP	MPG	FG%	FT%	RPG	APG	PPG
1962–63	St. Louis	**42**	10.4	.379	.564	.9	**2.0**	3.7
1963–64	St. Louis	2	3.0	.333	.000	.5	.0	1.0
1963–64	New York	4	12.5	.263	.750	**1.5**	1.3	4.0
1963–64	Detroit	**42**	**14.4**	.425	.679	1.3	1.8	**5.1**
1964–65	Detroit	4	6.5	.364	**.857**	1.0	1.3	3.5
Career		94	11.9	.396	.649	1.1	1.8	4.3

==== Playoffs ====
Year	Team	GP	MPG	FG%	FT%	RPG	APG	PPG
1963	St. Louis	5	4.8	.400	1.000	.6	.6	2.8

== Head coaching record ==
Record table
Season	Team	Overall	Conference	Standing	Postseason
**Colgate Red Raiders** (Independent) (1964–1967)
1964–65	Colgate	7–16			
1965–66	Colgate	8–14			
1966–67	Colgate	10–13			
Total:		25–43			
National champion Postseason invitational champion Conference regular season champion Conference regular season and conference tournament champion Division regular season champion Division regular season and conference tournament champion Conference tournament champion
