= Colgate Raiders men's basketball =

Basketball team that represents Colgate University

2026–27 Colgate Raiders men's basketball team
- University: Colgate University
- Head coach: Matt Langel (16th season)
- Location: Hamilton, New York
- Arena: Cotterell Court (capacity: 1,750)
- Conference: Patriot League
- Nickname: Raiders
- Colors: Maroon and white

NCAA Division I tournament appearances
- 1995, 1996, 2019, 2021, 2022, 2023, 2024

Conference tournament champions
- 1995, 1996, 2019, 2021, 2022, 2023, 2024

Conference regular-season champions
- 1994, 1995, 1996, 2019, 2020, 2022, 2023, 2024

Conference division champions
- Patriot North: 2021

Uniforms
Home	Away

The Colgate Raiders men's basketball team represents Colgate University in Hamilton, New York in NCAA Division I competition. The school's team competes in the Patriot League and play their home games in Cotterell Court. The Raiders have appeared in seven NCAA tournaments, most recently in 2024.

== Postseason history ==
=== NCAA tournament results ===
The Raiders have appeared in seven NCAA Tournaments. Their combined record is 0–7.

Year	Seed	Round	Opponent	Result
1995	#16	First Round	#1 Kansas	L 68–82
1996	#16	First Round	#1 Connecticut	L 59–68
2019	#15	First Round	#2 Tennessee	L 70–77
2021	#14	First Round	#3 Arkansas	L 68–85
2022	#14	First Round	#3 Wisconsin	L 60–67
2023	#15	First Round	#2 Texas	L 61–81
2024	#14	First Round	#3 Baylor	L 67–92

=== CBI results ===
The Raiders have appeared in the College Basketball Invitational (CBI) one time. Their record is 0–1.

Year	Round	Opponent	Result
2018	First Round	San Francisco	L 68–72

== Retired numbers ==
Colgate has retired five numbers to date:

Colgate Raiders retired numbers
No.	Player	Pos.	Career
11	Ernie Vandeweghe	SF	1945–49
20	Tucker Neale	SG	1992–95
24	Bob Duffy	PG	1959–62
31	Adonal Foyle	C	1994–97
44	Mike Ferrara	SG	1978–81

== Players in international leagues ==
- Will Rayman (born 1997), American-Israeli basketball player for maccabi tel Aviv b.c. in the Israeli Basketball Premier League
