= Holy Cross Crusaders men's basketball statistical leaders =

The Holy Cross Crusaders men's basketball statistical leaders are individual statistical leaders of the Holy Cross Crusaders men's basketball program in various categories, including points, rebounds, assists, steals, and blocks. Within those areas, the lists identify single-game, single-season, and career leaders. The Crusaders represent the College of the Holy Cross in the NCAA's Patriot League.

Holy Cross began competing in intercollegiate basketball in 1900. However, the school's record book does not generally list records from before the 1950s, as records from before this period are often incomplete and inconsistent. Since scoring was much lower in this era, and teams played much fewer games during a typical season, it is likely that few or no players from this era would appear on these lists anyway.

The NCAA did not officially record assists as a stat until the 1983–84 season, and blocks and steals until the 1985–86 season, but Holy Cross's record books includes players in these stats before these seasons. These lists are updated through the end of the 2020–21 season.

== Scoring ==
Career
Rank	Player	Points	Seasons
1	Ron Perry	2524	1976–77 1977–78 1978–79 1979–80
2	Rob Feaster	2224	1991–92 1992–93 1993–94 1994–95
3	Jack Foley	2185	1959–60 1960–61 1961–62
4	Dwight Pernell	1891	1986–87 1987–88 1988–89 1989–90
5	Chris Potter	1789	1974–75 1975–76 1976–77 1977–78
	Tom Heinsohn	1789	1953–54 1954–55 1955–56
7	Bob Cousy	1775	1946–47 1947–48 1948–49 1949–50
8	Michael Vicens	1721	1974–75 1975–76 1976–77 1977–78
9	Keith Simmons	1654	2003–04 2004–05 2005–06 2006–07
10	Togo Palazzi	1633	1951–52 1952–53 1953–54

Season
Rank	Player	Points	Season
1	Jack Foley	866	1961–62
2	Rob Feaster	785	1993–94
3	Tom Heinsohn	740	1955–56
4	Jack Foley	728	1960–61
5	Ron Perry	700	1978–79
6	Rob Feaster	674	1994–95
7	Togo Palazzi	670	1953–54
8	Ron Perry	665	1979–80
9	Dwight Pernell	650	1989–90
10	Jim McCaffrey	607	1984–85

Single game
Rank	Player	Points	Season	Opponent
1	Jack Foley	56	1961–62	Connecticut
2	Jack Foley	55	1959–60	Colgate
3	Tom Heinsohn	51	1955–56	Boston College
4	Togo Palazzi	47	1952–53	Brown
	Jack Foley	47	1961–62	Niagara
6	Ron Perry	46	1978–79	Connecticut
	Jim McCaffrey	46	1984–85	Iona
	Rob Feaster	46	1993–94	Navy
9	Jack Foley	45	1959–60	Amherst
10	Tom Heinsohn	44	1955–56	Yale

== Rebounds ==
Career
Rank	Player	Rebounds	Seasons
1	Tom Heinsohn	1254	1953–54 1954–55 1955–56
2	Togo Palazzi	1086	1951–52 1952–53 1953–54
3	Chris Potter	1019	1974–75 1975–76 1976–77 1977–78
4	Ralph Brandt	969	1957–58 1958–59 1959–60
5	Joe Hughes	921	1955–56 1956–57 1957–58
6	Ed Siudut	888	1966–67 1967–68 1968–69
7	Jim Schnurr	817	1970–71 1971–72 1972–73
8	Gene Doyle	796	1970–71 1971–72 1972–73
9	Bob Kissane	793	1968–69 1969–70 1970–71
10	Tim Szatko	783	1999–00 2000–01 2001–02 2002–03

Season
Rank	Player	Rebounds	Season
1	Tom Heinsohn	569	1955–56
2	Togo Palazzi	423	1952–53
3	Tom Heinsohn	385	1954–55
4	Ralph Brandt	374	1958–59
5	Togo Palazzi	366	1953–54
6	Joe Hughes	347	1957–58
7	Gene Doyle	340	1972–73
8	Josh Sankes	334	1999–00
9	Joe Hughes	331	1956–57
10	Ed Siudut	328	1967–68

Single game
Rank	Player	Rebounds	Season	Opponent
1	Tom Heinsohn	42	1955–56	Boston College
2	Togo Palazzi	31	1952–53	North Carolina
3	Togo Palazzi	28	1952–53	North Carolina State
4	Tom Heinsohn	23	1954–55	St. Francis (N.Y.)
5	Tom Heinsohn	22	1954–55	Boston College
	Stan Grayson	22	1970–71	Georgetown
7	James Kielley	20	1952–53	North Carolina State
	Togo Palazzi	20	1953–54	Boston College
	Togo Palazzi	20	1953–54	Connecticut
	Tom Heinsohn	20	1954–55	Massachusetts
	Tom Heinsohn	20	1954–55	Boston University

== Assists ==
Career
Rank	Player	Assists	Seasons
1	Glenn Williams	714	1985–86 1986–87 1987–88 1988–89
2	Jave Meade	599	2000–01 2001–02 2002–03 2003–04
3	Roger Breslin	475	1989–90 1990–91 1991–92 1992–93
4	Chris Potter	470	1974–75 1975–76 1976–77 1977–78
5	Torey Thomas	468	2003–04 2004–05 2005–06 2006–07
6	Dwight Pernell	430	1986–87 1987–88 1988–89 1989–90
7	Ronnie Perry	422	1976–77 1977–78 1978–79 1979–80
8	Justin Burrell	414	2011–12 2012–13 2013–14 2014–15
9	Kevin McAuley	392	1973–74 1974–75 1975–76 1976–77
10	Larry Westbrook	359	1981–82 1982–83 1983–84 1984–85

Season
Rank	Player	Assists	Season
1	Glenn Williams	278	1988–89
2	Glenn Williams	234	1987–88
3	Roger Breslin	214	1992–93
4	Jave Meade	193	2002–03
5	Roger Breslin	186	1991–92
6	Aaron Jordan	175	1990–91
7	Bob Kelly	164	1978–79
8	Jave Meade	162	2001–02
9	Torey Thomas	160	2006–07
10	Dwight Pernell	159	1989–90

Single game
Rank	Player	Assists	Season	Opponent
1	Glenn Williams	17	1987–88	Army
2	Chris Potter	16	1977–78	Iona
	Glenn Williams	16	1988–89	Iona
4	Jim McCaffrey	15	1984–85	Iona
	Glenn Williams	15	1987–88	Iona
	Glenn Williams	15	1988–89	Northeastern

== Steals ==
Career
Rank	Player	Steals	Seasons
1	Kevin Hamilton	292	2002–03 2003–04 2004–05 2005–06
2	Torey Thomas	268	2003–04 2004–05 2005–06 2006–07
3	Jave Meade	246	2000–01 2001–02 2002–03 2003–04
4	Dwight Pernell	204	1986–87 1987–88 1988–89 1989–90
5	Keith Simmons	191	2003–04 2004–05 2005–06 2006–07
6	Ted Bettencourt	172	1992–93 1993–94 1994–95 1995–96
7	Rob Feaster	166	1991–92 1992–93 1993–94 1994–95
8	Anthony Thompson	150	2013–14 2014–15 2015–16 2016–17
9	Gordon Hamilton	143	1991–92 1992–93 1993–94 1994–95
10	Brian Reale	139	1982–83 1983–84 1984–85 1985–86

Season
Rank	Player	Steals	Season
1	Kevin Hamilton	102	2005–06
2	Torey Thomas	95	2006–07
3	Kevin Hamilton	92	2004–05
4	Gordon Hamilton	78	1993–94
5	Torey Thomas	77	2005–06
	Keith Simmons	77	2006–07
7	Ted Bettencourt	76	1995–96
8	Kevin Hamilton	72	2003–04
9	Jave Meade	71	2001–02
10	Jave Meade	65	2002–03

Single game
Rank	Player	Steals	Season	Opponent
1	Garry Witts	7	1978–79	Massachusetts
	Brian Reale	7	1985–86	Iona
	Rob Feaster	7	1992–93	Lehigh
	Ted Bettencourt	7	1995–96	Fordham
	Greg Kinsey	7	2002–03	Brown
	Kevin Hamilton	7	2005–06	Harvard
	Kevin Hamilton	7	2005–06	Lafayette
	Kevin Hamilton	7	2005–06	Colgate
	Keith Simmons	7	2006–07	William & Mary
	Torey Thomas	7	2006–07	Lehigh

== Blocks ==
Career
Rank	Player	Blocks	Seasons
1	Tim Clifford	210	2004–05 2005–06 2006–07 2007–08
2	Jehyve Floyd	193	2015–16 2016–17 2017–18 2018–19
3	Caleb Kenney	156	2021–22 2022–23 2023–24 2024–25
4	Nate Lufkin	153	2001–02 2002–03 2003–04 2004–05
5	Malcolm Miller	143	2011–12 2012–13 2013–14 2014–15
6	Josh Sankes	135	1999–00 2000–01
7	Patrick Whearty	131	1998–99 1999–00 2000–01 2001–02 2002–03
8	Eric Obeysekere	123	2009–10 2010–11 2011–12 2012–13
9	Matt Faw	109	2017–18 2018–19 2019–20 2020–21
10	Patrick Tutwiler	104	1993–94 1994–95 1995–96 1996–97

Season
Rank	Player	Blocks	Season
1	Jehyve Floyd	80	2018–19
2	Caleb Kenney	71	2023–24
3	Josh Sankes	69	1999–00
4	Tim Clifford	67	2007–08
	Jehyve Floyd	67	2017–18
6	Josh Sankes	66	2000–01
7	Tim Clifford	64	2006–07
8	Malcolm Miller	63	2013–14
9	Nate Lufkin	51	2004–05
	John Young	51	1993–94

Single game
Rank	Player	Blocks	Season	Opponent
1	Eric Meister	9	2009–10	Army
2	Josh Sankes	7	1999–00	Colgate
	Tim Clifford	7	2007–08	Lehigh
	Eric Obeysekere	7	2010–11	Navy
	Malcolm Miller	7	2013–14	New Jersey Tech
	Jehyve Floyd	7	2018–19	Stony Brook
	Caleb Kenney	7	2023–24	Boston University
8	John O’Connor	6	1976–77	Harvard
	Ernie Floyd	6	1979–80	Yale
	Charlie Browne	6	1980–81	Harvard
	Patrick Tutwiler	6	1994–95	Lehigh
	Tim Clifford	6	2004–05	Marist
	Tim Clifford	6	2004–05	Lafayette
	Tim Clifford	6	2006–07	Army
	Tim Clifford	6	2006–07	Bucknell
	Tim Clifford	6	2007–08	Yale
	Tim Clifford	6	2007–08	Boston University
	Eric Obeysekere	6	2010–11	Sacred Heart
	Malcolm Miller	6	2013–14	Loyola (Md.)
	Jehyve Floyd	6	2017–18	American
	Jehyve Floyd	6	2017–18	Lehigh
	Jehyve Floyd	6	2018–19	Albany
	Jehyve Floyd	6	2018–19	Fairleigh Dickinson
	Jehyve Floyd	6	2018–19	American
