= 2002 Patriot League men's basketball tournament =

- Classification: Division I
- Season: 2001–02
- Teams: 8
- Site: The Show Place Arena; Upper Marlboro, Maryland
- Finals site: Bender Arena; Washington, D.C.
- Champions: Holy Cross (3rd title)
- Winning coach: Ralph Willard (2nd title)
- MVP: Tim Szatko (Holy Cross)

2001–02 Patriot League men's basketball standings
	Conf.				Overall
Team	W		L	PCT	W		L	PCT
American	10	–	4	.714	18	–	12	.600
Holy Cross †	9	–	5	.643	18	–	15	.545
Bucknell	8	–	6	.571	13	–	16	.448
Colgate	8	–	6	.571	17	–	11	.607
Lafayette	8	–	6	.571	15	–	14	.517
Army	6	–	8	.429	12	–	16	.429
Navy	5	–	9	.357	10	–	20	.333
Lehigh	2	–	12	.143	5	–	23	.179
† 2002 Patriot League tournament winner

The 2002 Patriot League men's basketball tournament was played at The Show Place Arena in Upper Marlboro, Maryland and Bender Arena in Washington, D.C. after the conclusion of the 2001–02 regular season. Number two seed Holy Cross defeated top seed American, 58–54 in the championship game, to win its third Patriot League Tournament title. The Crusaders earned an automatic bid to the 2002 NCAA tournament as #16 seed in the Midwest region.

== Format ==
All eight league members participated in the tournament, with teams seeded according to regular season conference record.

== Bracket ==
Quarterfinals; March 2
1	American	82
8	Lehigh	69
4	Colgate	71
5	Lafayette	74
3	Bucknell	70
6	Army	59
2	Holy Cross	59
7	Navy	41

Semifinals; March 3
1	American	66
5	Lafayette	58
3	Bucknell	57
2	Holy Cross	64

Championship game March 8
1	American	54
2	Holy Cross	58
