= Kevin Hamilton =

Kevin Hamilton may refer to:

- Kevin Hamilton (basketball) (born 1984), American professional basketball player
- Kevin Hamilton (politician) (born 1938), Australian politician
