= Chris Appel =

American basketball player

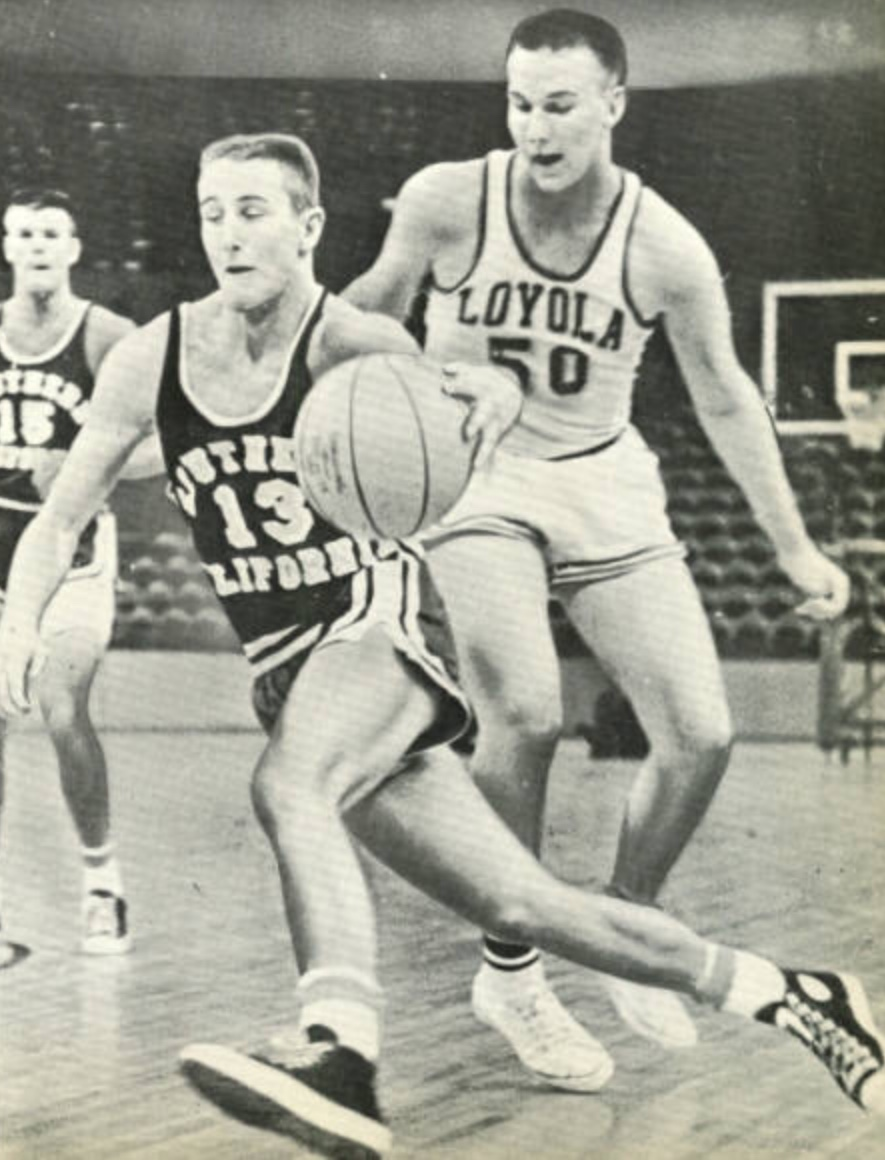
- Appel (#13) from the 1961 "El Rodeo"

Personal information
- Born: Hollywood, California, U.S.
- Listed height: 6 ft 2 in (1.88 m)
- Listed weight: 190 lb (86 kg)

Career information
- High school: Hollywood (Hollywood, California)
- College: USC (1959–1962)
- NBA draft: 1962: 3rd round, 24th overall pick
- Drafted by: Cincinnati Royals
- Position: Guard

Career highlights
- Second-team All-American – SN (1962); 2× First-team All-AAWU (1961, 1962)
- Stats at Basketball Reference

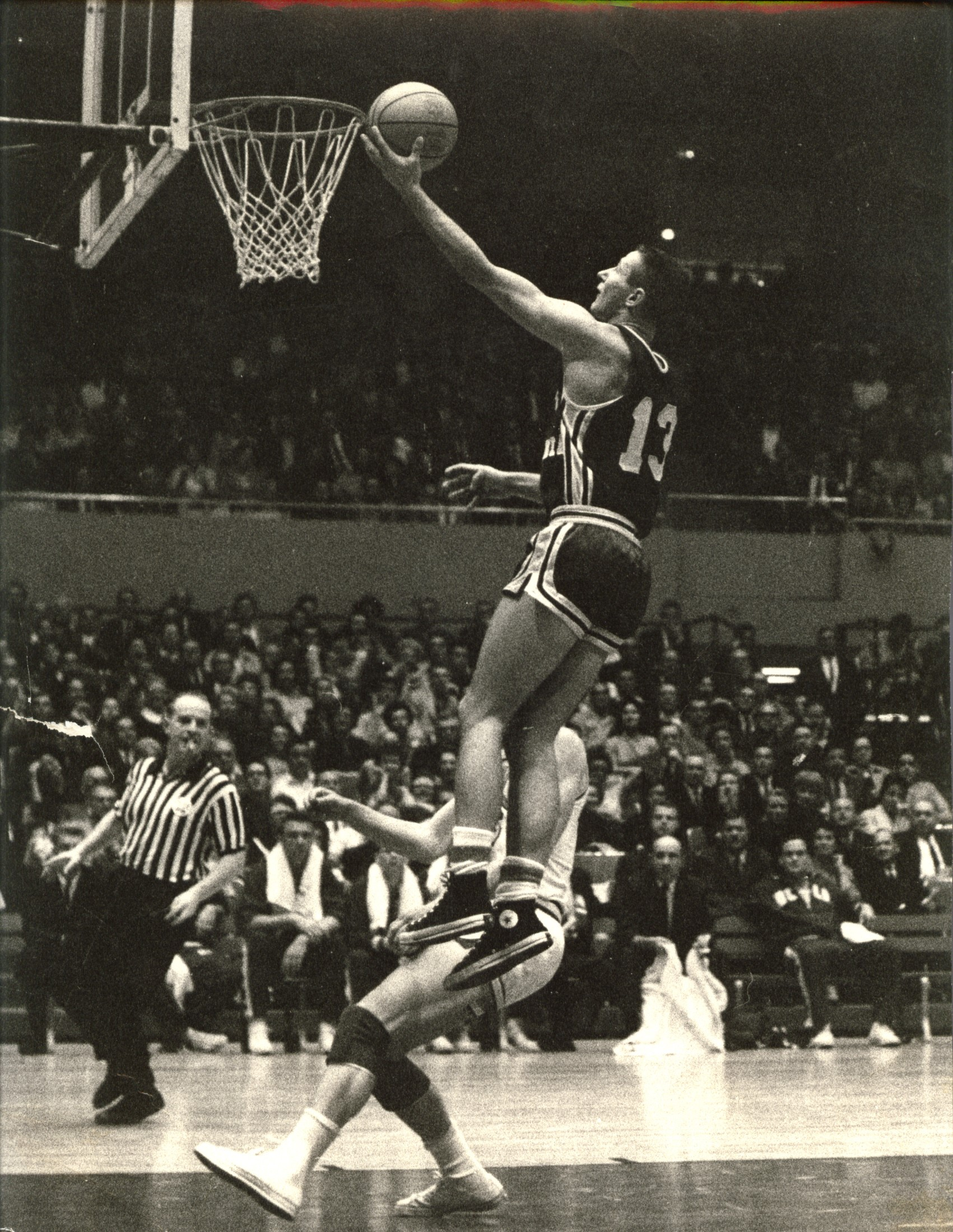
Appel is fouled driving for a layup against 6'8 UCLA center John Berberich.

Chris Appel is an American former basketball player. He is known for his All-American college career at the University of Southern California.

Appel came to USC from Hollywood High School in Hollywood, Los Angeles. He came into his own in his sophomore year, averaging 13.4 points per game, lifting the Trojans into the 1961 NCAA tournament, and joining teammate John Rudometkin as a unanimous first-team all-conference choice. As a senior, Appel repeated on the all-conference team and was named a second-team All-American by the Sporting News magazine.

After completing his college career, Appel was drafted by the Cincinnati Royals in the third round of the 1962 NBA draft (24th pick overall). He elected not to pursue a career in professional basketball and instead became a teacher and school administrator and spent decades conducting basketball clinics in Asia, Africa and all over the world. Appel began this work due to both his basketball skill and background and his ability to speak French, learned from his Russian and French parents. His first assignments were in French-speaking Cambodia.
