= 2002–03 Holy Cross Crusaders men's basketball team =

American college basketball season

2002–03 Holy Cross Crusaders men's basketball

Patriot League regular season and tournament champions

NCAA tournament, First round
- Conference: Patriot League
- Record: 26–5 (13–1 Patriot)
- Head coach: Ralph Willard (4th season)
- Home arena: Hart Center

2002–03 Patriot League men's basketball standings
	Conf.				Overall
Team	W		L	PCT	W		L	PCT
Holy Cross †	13	–	1	.929	26	–	5	.839
American	9	–	5	.643	16	–	14	.533
Colgate	9	–	5	.643	14	–	14	.500
Lehigh	8	–	6	.571	16	–	12	.571
Bucknell	7	–	7	.500	14	–	15	.483
Lafayette	6	–	8	.429	13	–	16	.448
Navy	4	–	10	.286	8	–	20	.286
Army	0	–	14	.000	5	–	22	.185
† 2003 Patriot League tournament winner

The 2002–03 Holy Cross Crusaders men's basketball team represented the College of the Holy Cross during the 2002–03 NCAA Division I men's basketball season. The Crusaders, led by 4th-year head coach Ralph Willard, played their home games at the Hart Center and were members of the Patriot League. They finished the season 26–5, 13–1 in Patriot League play to win the regular season league title. As the #1 seed, they defeated Army, Bucknell, and American to be champions of the Patriot League tournament and earn the conference's automatic bid to the NCAA tournament. Playing as the No. 14 seed in the Midwest region, they were beaten by No. 3 seed and eventual Final Four participant Marquette, 72–68.

== Roster ==
2002–03 Holy Cross Crusaders men's basketball team
Players
Coaches

Pos.	#	Name	Height	Weight	Year	Previous school	Hometown
G	14	Kevin Hamilton	6 ft 4 in (1.93 m)	190 lb (86 kg)	Fr	Archbishop Molloy	Queens Village, New York
F	35	Tim Szatko	6 ft 8 in (2.03 m)	220 lb (100 kg)	Sr	Naperville Central	Naperville, Illinois
C	45	Patrick Whearty	6 ft 10 in (2.08 m)	245 lb (111 kg)	Sr	Our Lady of Lourdes	Poughkeepsie, New York

Head coach

- Ralph Willard

Assistant coach(es)

Legend

- (C) Team captain
- (S) Suspended
- (I) Ineligible
- (W) Walk-on
- Injured
- Current redshirt

Roster

== Schedule and results ==
Date time, TV	Rank^{#}	Opponent^{#}	Result	Record	Site (attendance) city, state
Non-conference regular season
Nov 19, 2002*; ESPN		at No. 2 Kansas; Preseason NIT	L 57–81	0–1	Allen Fieldhouse (16,300); Lawrence, Kansas
Nov 23, 2002*		at Dowling	W 101–61	1–1	Hart Center (1,023); Worcester, Massachusetts
Nov 26, 2002*		at Harvard	W 71–66	2–1	Lavietes Pavilion (1,306); Cambridge, Massachusetts
Dec 1, 2002*		Boston College	W 71–70	3–1	Worcester Centrum (3,620); Worcester, Massachusetts
Dec 7, 2002*		at Brown	W 72–56	4–1	Pizzitola Sports Center (1,571); Providence, Rhode Island
Dec 11, 2002*		vs. Yale; Phoenix Classic	L 66–70	4–2	XL Center (4,182); Hartford, Connecticut
Dec 12, 2002*		vs. Hartford; Phoenix Classic	W 79–53	5–2	XL Center (6,617); Hartford, Connecticut
Dec 22, 2002*		UNC Asheville	W 84–53	6–2	Hart Center (2,389); Worcester, Massachusetts
Dec 28, 2002*		at Marist	L 63–66	6–3	McCann Arena (2,678); Poughkeepsie, New York
Dec 31, 2002*		at Fordham	W 87–54	7–3	Rose Hill Gymnasium (1,926); Bronx, New York
Jan 3, 2003*		Princeton	W 55–54	8–3	Hart Center (1,046); Worcester, Massachusetts
Jan 7, 2003*		at Quinnipiac	W 83–75	9–3	Burt Kahn Court (1,344); Hamden, Connecticut
Patriot League regular season
Jan 11, 2003		Army	W 61–45	10–3 (1–0)	Hart Center (3,128); Worcester, Massachusetts
Jan 15, 2003		Colgate	W 86–43	11–3 (2–0)	Hart Center (2,839); Worcester, Massachusetts
Jan 18, 2003		at Lafayette	W 76–70	12–3 (3–0)	Kirby Sports Center (2,945); Easton, Pennsylvania
Jan 21, 2003*		Dartmouth	W 63–43	13–3	Hart Center (2,024); Worcester, Massachusetts
Jan 24, 2003		at Navy	W 76–61	14–3 (4–0)	Alumni Hall (2,203); Annapolis, Maryland
Jan 26, 2003		at American	L 49–72	14–4 (4–1)	Bender Arena (1,823); Washington D.C.
Jan 31, 2003		Lehigh	W 63–39	15–4 (5–1)	Hart Center (3,215); Worcester, Massachusetts
Feb 2, 2003		Bucknell	W 69–47	16–4 (6–1)	Hart Center (4,000); Worcester, Massachusetts
Feb 8, 2003		at Army	W 53–45	17–4 (7–1)	Christl Arena (1,537); West Point, New York
Feb 12, 2003		at Colgate	W 92–91 ^{OT}	18–4 (8–1)	Cotterell Court (562); Hamilton, New York
Feb 15, 2003		Lafayette	W 73–65	19–4 (9–1)	Hart Center (4,000); Worcester, Massachusetts
Feb 21, 2003		American	W 68–66	20–4 (10–1)	Hart Center (3,847); Worcester, Massachusetts
Feb 23, 2003		Navy	W 63–42	21–4 (11–1)	Hart Center (4,000); Worcester, Massachusetts
Feb 28, 2003		at Bucknell	W 54–43	22–4 (12–1)	Davis Gym (2,182); Lewisburg, Pennsylvania
Mar 2, 2003		at Lehigh	W 72–64	23–4 (13–1)	Stabler Arena (3,273); Bethlehem, Pennsylvania
Patriot League Tournament
Mar 8, 2003*		vs. Army; Quarterfinals	W 58–40	24–4	The Show Place Arena (2,523); Upper Marlboro, Maryland
Mar 9, 2003*		vs. Bucknell; Semifinals	W 75–50	25–4	The Show Place Arena (3,356); Upper Marlboro, Maryland
Mar 14, 2003*		American; Championship game	W 72–64	26–4	Hart Center (4,000); Worcester, Massachusetts
NCAA Tournament
Mar 20, 2003*	(14 MW)	vs. (3 MW) No. 9 Marquette; First round	L 68–72	26–5	RCA Dome (25,000); Indianapolis, Indiana
*Non-conference game. ^{#}Rankings from AP Poll. (#) Tournament seedings in parentheses. MW=Midwest Region. All times are in Eastern Time..
