= 2001–02 Holy Cross Crusaders men's basketball team =

American college basketball season

2001–02 Holy Cross Crusaders men's basketball

Patriot League tournament champions

NCAA tournament, First round
- Conference: Patriot League
- Record: 18–15 (9–5 Patriot)
- Head coach: Ralph Willard (3rd season)
- Home arena: Hart Center

2001–02 Patriot League men's basketball standings
	Conf.				Overall
Team	W		L	PCT	W		L	PCT
American	10	–	4	.714	18	–	12	.600
Holy Cross †	9	–	5	.643	18	–	15	.545
Bucknell	8	–	6	.571	13	–	16	.448
Colgate	8	–	6	.571	17	–	11	.607
Lafayette	8	–	6	.571	15	–	14	.517
Army	6	–	8	.429	12	–	16	.429
Navy	5	–	9	.357	10	–	20	.333
Lehigh	2	–	12	.143	5	–	23	.179
† 2002 Patriot League tournament winner

The 2001–02 Holy Cross Crusaders men's basketball team represented the College of the Holy Cross during the 2001–02 NCAA Division I men's basketball season. The Crusaders, led by 3rd-year head coach Ralph Willard, played their home games at the Hart Center and were members of the Patriot League. They finished the season 18–15, 9–5 in Patriot League play to finish second in the regular season standings. As the #2 seed, they defeated Navy, Bucknell, and American to be champions of the Patriot League tournament and earn the conference's automatic bid to the NCAA tournament. Playing as the No. 16 seed in the East region, they were beaten by No. 1 seed and eventual Final Four participant Kansas, 70–59.

== Roster ==
2001–02 Holy Cross Crusaders men's basketball team
Players
Coaches

Pos.	#	Name	Height	Weight	Year	Previous school	Hometown
F	35	Tim Szatko	6 ft 8 in (2.03 m)	220 lb (100 kg)	Jr	Naperville Central	Naperville, Illinois
C	45	Patrick Whearty	6 ft 10 in (2.08 m)	245 lb (111 kg)	Jr	Our Lady of Lourdes	Poughkeepsie, New York

Head coach

- Ralph Willard

Assistant coach(es)

Legend

- (C) Team captain
- (S) Suspended
- (I) Ineligible
- (W) Walk-on
- Injured
- Current redshirt

Roster

== Schedule and results ==
Date time, TV	Rank^{#}	Opponent^{#}	Result	Record	Site (attendance) city, state
Non-conference regular season
Nov 16, 2001*		Quinnipiac	W 85–57	1–0	Hart Center; Worcester, Massachusetts
Nov 20, 2001*		Harvard	W 65–57	2–0	Hart Center; Worcester, Massachusetts
Nov 23, 2001*		at Manhattan	L 62–75	2–1	Draddy Gymnasium; Riverdale, New York
Nov 27, 2001*		at Dartmouth	L 47–58	2–2	Leede Arena; Hanover, New Hampshire
Dec 1, 2001*		Boston University	L 49–61	2–3	Hart Center; Worcester, Massachusetts
Dec 4, 2001*		at UMass	W 67–56	3–3	Mullins Center; Amherst, Massachusetts
Dec 6, 2001*		Brown	W 76–63	4–3	Hart Center; Worcester, Massachusetts
Dec 16, 2001*		at No. 11 Boston College	L 51–75	4–4	Silvio O. Conte Forum (5,584); Chestnut Hill, Massachusetts
Dec 19, 2001*		vs. Iona; Rainbow Classic	L 59–71	4–5	Stan Sheriff Center (500); Honolulu, Hawaii
Dec 21, 2001*		vs. Portland; Rainbow Classic	W 60–43	5–5	Stan Sheriff Center (429); Honolulu, Hawaii
Dec 22, 2001*		vs. No. 10 Boston College; Rainbow Classic	L 57–67	5–6	Stan Sheriff Center (5,876); Honolulu, Hawaii
Dec 28, 2001*		vs. Radford; College of Charleston State Farm Classic	L 49–66	5–7	F. Mitchell Johnson Arena; Charleston, South Carolina
Dec 29, 2001*; 6:00 p.m.		vs. Louisiana–Monroe; College of Charleston State Farm Classic	L 57–63	5–8	F. Mitchell Johnson Arena; Charleston, South Carolina
Jan 2, 2002*; 7:00 p.m.		Fordham	W 95–75	6–8	Hart Center (1,461); Worcester, Massachusetts
Jan 5, 2002*		at Princeton	L 50–52	6–9	Jadwin Gymnasium (5,610); Princeton, New Jersey
Patriot League regular season
Jan 9, 2002		Navy	W 70–57	7–9 (1–0)	Hart Center; Worcester, Massachusetts
Jan 12, 2002		at Lafayette	L 58–64	7–10 (1–1)	Kirby Sports Center; Easton, Pennsylvania
Jan 16, 2002		Colgate	L 42–46	7–11 (1–2)	Hart Center; Worcester, Massachusetts
Jan 19, 2002		at Lehigh	W 72–66	8–11 (2–2)	Stabler Arena; Bethlehem, Pennsylvania
Jan 23, 2002		at Army	L 46–57	8–12 (2–3)	Christl Arena; West Point, New York
Jan 26, 2002		American	W 63–54	9–12 (3–3)	Hart Center; Worcester, Massachusetts
Jan 30, 2002		at Bucknell	W 73–65	10–12 (4–3)	Davis Gym; Lewisburg, Pennsylvania
Feb 2, 2002		at Navy	W 62–54	11–12 (5–3)	Alumni Hall; Annapolis, Maryland
Feb 6, 2002		Lafayette	W 76–70 ^{OT}	12–12 (6–3)	Hart Center; Worcester, Massachusetts
Feb 9, 2002		at Colgate	L 55–58	12–13 (6–4)	Cotterell Court; Hamilton, New York
Feb 13, 2002		Lehigh	W 79–40	13–13 (7–4)	Hart Center; Worcester, Massachusetts
Feb 16, 2002		Army	W 77–57	14–13 (8–4)	Hart Center; Worcester, Massachusetts
Feb 20, 2002		Bucknell	L 73–75	14–14 (8–5)	Hart Center; Worcester, Massachusetts
Feb 23, 2002		at American	W 68–44	15–14 (9–5)	Bender Arena; Washington, D.C.
Patriot League Tournament
Mar 2, 2002*	(2)	vs. (7) Navy; Quarterfinals	W 59–41	16–14	The Show Place Arena (2,897); Upper Marlboro, Maryland
Mar 3, 2002*	(2)	vs. (3) Bucknell; Semifinals	W 64–57	17–14	The Show Place Arena (2,041); Upper Marlboro, Maryland
Mar 8, 2002*	(2)	at (1) American; Championship game	W 58–54	18–14	Bender Arena (4,521); Washington, D.C.
NCAA Tournament
Mar 14, 2002*	(16 MW)	vs. (1 MW) No. 2 Kansas; First round	L 59–70	18–15	Edward Jones Dome (26,612); St. Louis, Missouri
*Non-conference game. ^{#}Rankings from AP Poll. (#) Tournament seedings in parentheses. MW=Midwest. All times are in Eastern Time..
