= 2007 Patriot League men's basketball tournament =

- Classification: Division I
- Season: 2006–07
- Teams: 8
- Site: Campus sites
- Finals site: Bender Arena; Washington, D.C.
- Champions: Holy Cross (5th title)
- Winning coach: Ralph Willard (4th title)
- MVP: Keith Simmons (Holy Cross)

2006–07 Patriot League men's basketball standings
	Conf.				Overall
Team	W		L	PCT	W		L	PCT
Holy Cross †	13	–	1	.929	25	–	9	.735
Bucknell	13	–	1	.929	22	–	9	.710
Lehigh	7	–	7	.500	12	–	19	.387
American	7	–	7	.500	16	–	14	.533
Colgate	5	–	9	.357	10	–	19	.345
Army	4	–	10	.286	15	–	16	.484
Navy	4	–	10	.286	14	–	16	.467
Lafayette	3	–	11	.214	9	–	21	.300
† 2007 Patriot League tournament winner

The 2007 Patriot League men's basketball tournament was played at Hart Center in Worcester, Massachusetts and Sojka Pavilion in Lewisburg, Pennsylvania after the conclusion of the 2006–07 regular season. Top seed Holy Cross defeated #2 seed Bucknell, 74–66 in the championship game, to win its fifth Patriot League Tournament title. The Crusaders earned an automatic bid to the 2007 NCAA tournament as #13 seed in the West region.

== Format ==
All eight league members participated in the tournament, with teams seeded according to regular season conference record.

== Bracket ==
Quarterfinals; February 28
1	Holy Cross	83
8	Lafayette	53
4	American	59
5	Colgate	44
3	Lehigh	46
6	Army	47
2	Bucknell	62
7	Navy	43

Semifinals; March 4
1	Holy Cross	55
4	American	53
6	Army	47
2	Bucknell	68

Championship game March 9
1	Holy Cross	74
2	Bucknell	66
