= 2000–01 Holy Cross Crusaders men's basketball team =

American college basketball season

2000–01 Holy Cross Crusaders men's basketball

Patriot League regular season and tournament champions

NCAA tournament, First round
- Conference: Patriot League
- Record: 22–8 (10–2 Patriot)
- Head coach: Ralph Willard (2nd season)
- Home arena: Hart Center

2000–01 Patriot League men's basketball standings
	Conf.				Overall
Team	W		L	PCT	W		L	PCT
Holy Cross †	10	–	2	.833	22	–	8	.733
Navy	9	–	3	.750	19	–	12	.613
Colgate	6	–	6	.500	13	–	15	.464
Lehigh	6	–	6	.500	13	–	16	.448
Lafayette	4	–	8	.333	12	–	16	.429
Bucknell	4	–	8	.333	14	–	15	.483
Army	3	–	9	.250	9	–	19	.321
† 2001 Patriot League tournament winner

The 2000–01 Holy Cross Crusaders men's basketball team represented the College of the Holy Cross during the 2000–01 NCAA Division I men's basketball season. The Crusaders, led by 2nd-year head coach Ralph Willard, played their home games at the Hart Center and were members of the Patriot League. They finished the season 22–8, 10–2 in Patriot League play to win the regular season league title. As the #1 seed, they defeated Lehigh and Navy to be champions of the Patriot League tournament and earn the conference's automatic bid to the NCAA tournament. Playing as the No. 14 seed in the East region, they were beaten by No. 2 seed Kentucky, 72–68.

== Roster ==
2000–01 Holy Cross Crusaders men's basketball team
Players
Coaches

Pos.	#	Name	Height	Weight	Year	Previous school	Hometown
F	35	Tim Szatko	6 ft 8 in (2.03 m)	220 lb (100 kg)	So	Naperville Central	Naperville, Illinois
C	45	Patrick Whearty	6 ft 10 in (2.08 m)	245 lb (111 kg)	So	Our Lady of Lourdes	Poughkeepsie, New York

Head coach

- Ralph Willard

Assistant coach(es)

Legend

- (C) Team captain
- (S) Suspended
- (I) Ineligible
- (W) Walk-on
- Injured
- Current redshirt

Roster

== Schedule and results ==
Date time, TV	Rank^{#}	Opponent^{#}	Result	Record	Site (attendance) city, state
Non-conference regular season
Nov 18, 2000*		at Providence	L 57–63	0–1	Providence Civic Center; Providence, Rhode Island
Dec 4, 2000*		at Boston College	L 48–77	4–2	Silvio O. Conte Forum; Chestnut Hill, Massachusetts
Patriot League regular season
Patriot League Tournament
Mar 4, 2001*		Lehigh; Semifinals	W 69–57	21–7	Hart Center; Worcester, Massachusetts
Mar 9, 2001*		Navy; Championship game	W 68–64 ^{OT}	22–7	Hart Center; Worcester, Massachusetts
NCAA Tournament
Mar 15, 2001*	(14 E)	vs. (3 E) No. 9 Kentucky; First round	L 68–72	22–8	Nassau Coliseum; Uniondale, New York
*Non-conference game. ^{#}Rankings from AP Poll. (#) Tournament seedings in parentheses. E=East. All times are in Eastern Time..
