= 1993 Patriot League men's basketball tournament =

- Classification: Division I
- Season: 1992–93
- Teams: 8
- Site: Campus sites
- Finals site: Davis Gym; Lewisburg, Pennsylvania
- Champions: Holy Cross (1st title)
- Winning coach: George Blaney (1st title)
- MVP: Rob Feaster (Holy Cross)

1992–93 Patriot League men's basketball standings
	Conf.				Overall
Team	W		L	PCT	W		L	PCT
Bucknell	13	–	1	.929	23	–	6	.793
Holy Cross †	12	–	2	.857	23	–	7	.767
Fordham	9	–	5	.643	15	–	16	.484
Colgate	9	–	5	.643	18	–	10	.643
Navy	5	–	9	.357	8	–	19	.296
Lafayette	4	–	10	.286	7	–	20	.259
Army	2	–	12	.143	4	–	22	.154
Lehigh	2	–	12	.143	4	–	23	.148
† 1993 Patriot League tournament winner

The 1993 Patriot League men's basketball tournament was played at Davis Gym in Lewisburg, Pennsylvania after the conclusion of the 1992–93 regular season. Number two seed Holy Cross defeated top seed Bucknell, 98–73 in the championship game, to win its first Patriot League Tournament title. The Crusaders earned an automatic bid to the 1993 NCAA tournament as #13 seed in the East region.

== Format ==
All eight league members participated in the tournament, with teams seeded according to regular season conference record. Play began with the quarterfinal round.

== Bracket ==
Quarterfinals; March 3
1	Bucknell	69*
8	Lehigh	65
4	Colgate	84
5	Navy	80
3	Fordham	84
6	Lafayette	73
2	Holy Cross	85
7	Army	68

Semifinals; March 6
1	Bucknell	75
4	Colgate	73
3	Fordham	78
2	Holy Cross	86

Championship game March 10
1	Bucknell	73
2	Holy Cross	98

* denotes overtime period
