= 1962 NCAA Men's Basketball All-Americans =

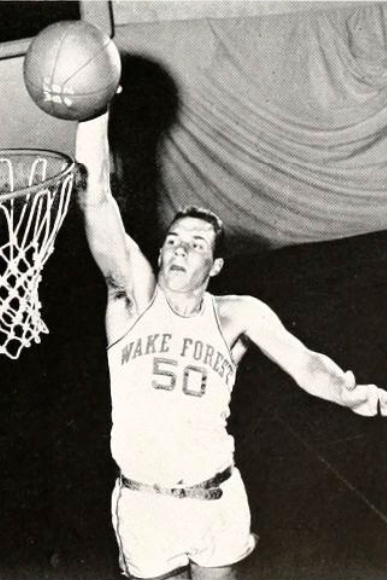
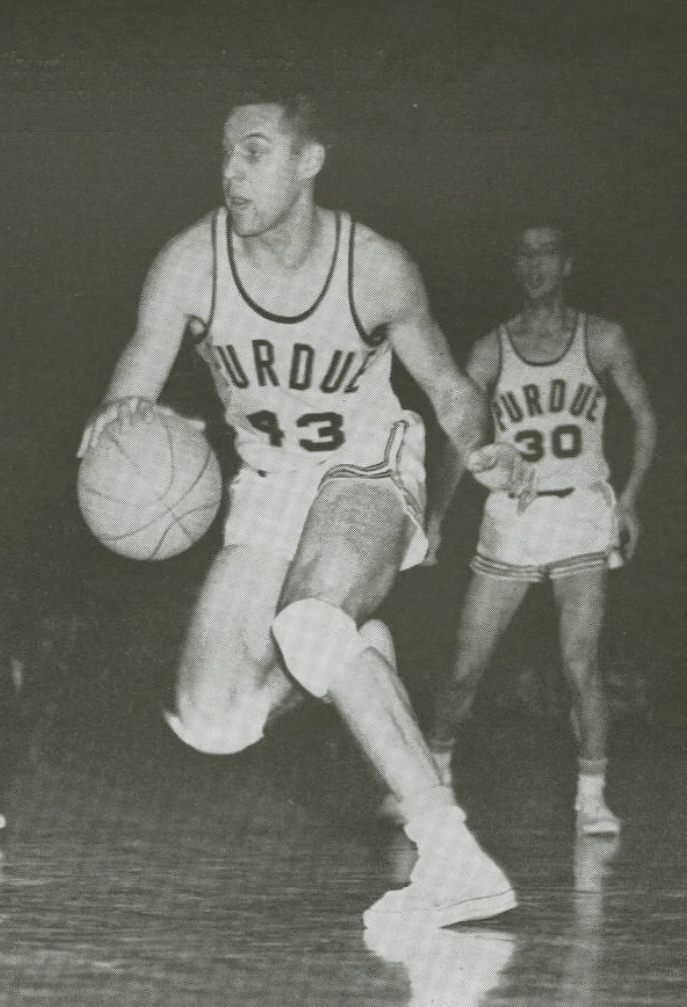
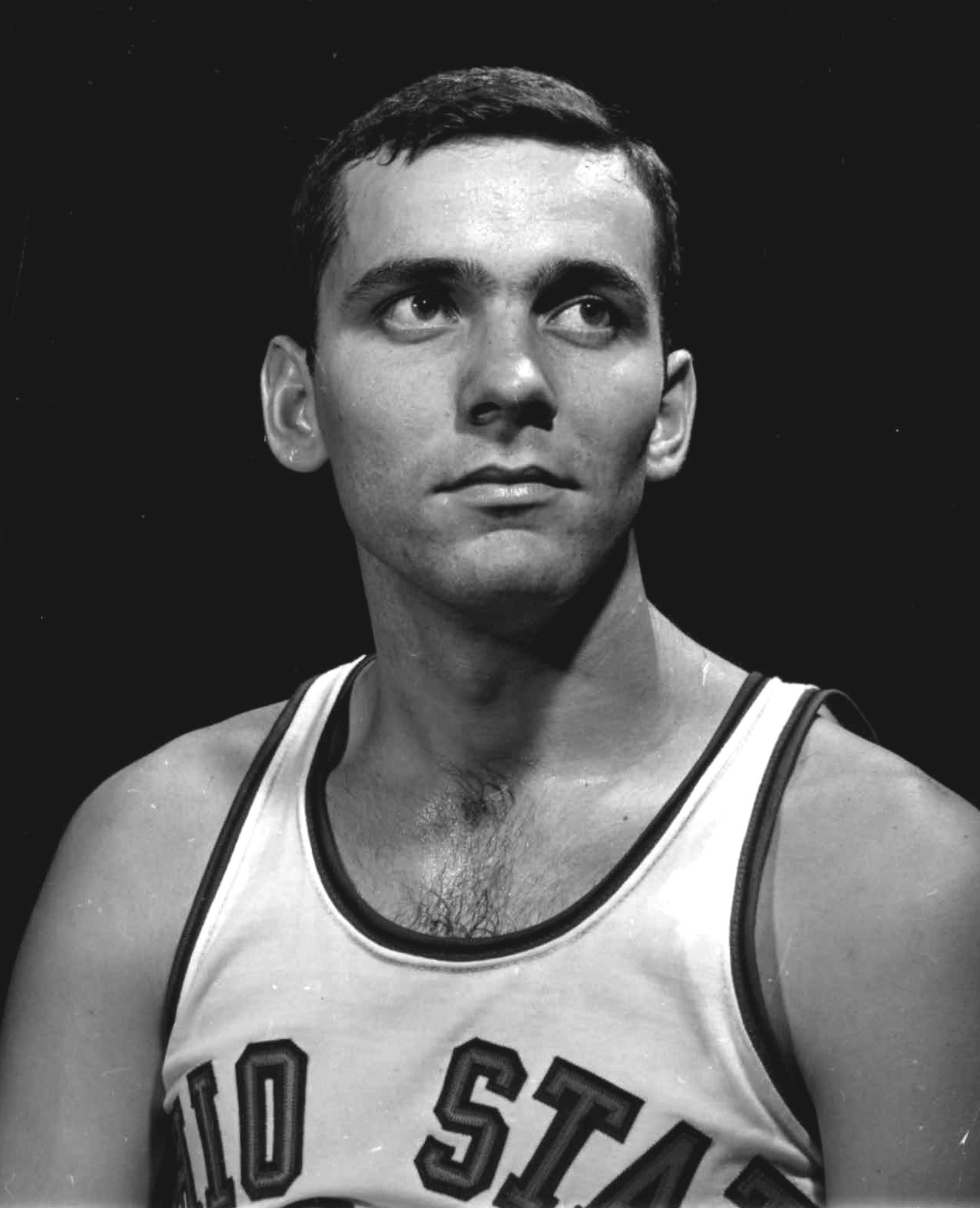
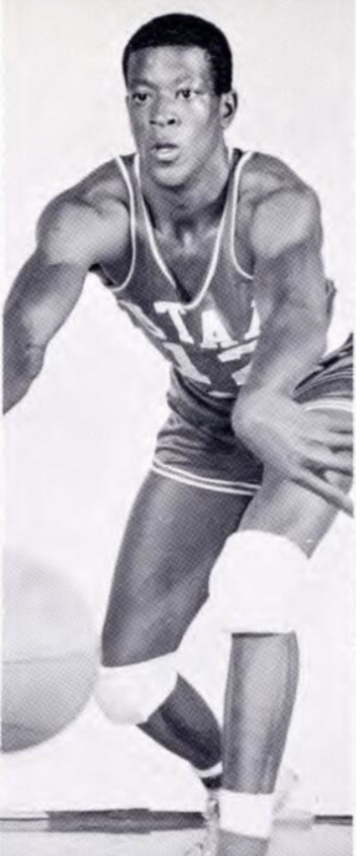
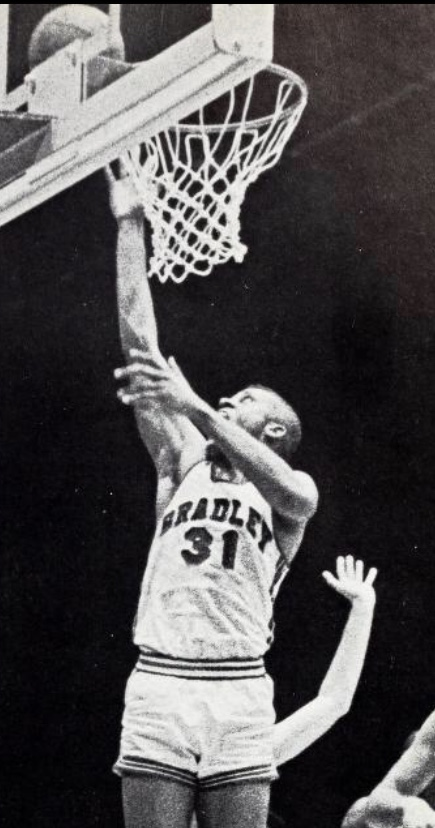
- The 1962 consensus first team. Clockwise from top left: Chappell, Dischinger, Walker, McGill, Lucas.
- Awarded for: 1961–62 NCAA University Division men's basketball season

The consensus 1962 College Basketball All-American team, as determined by aggregating the results of six major All-American teams. To earn "consensus" status, a player must win honors from a majority of the following teams: the Associated Press, the USBWA, The United Press International, the National Association of Basketball Coaches, the Newspaper Enterprise Association (NEA), and The Sporting News. 1962 was the last year that The Sporting News teams were used, although they would once again be used to determine consensus teams, starting in 1998.

== 1962 Consensus All-America team ==
Consensus First Team
Player	Position	Class	Team
Len Chappell	C/F	Senior	Wake Forest
Terry Dischinger	F	Senior	Purdue
Jerry Lucas	F/C	Senior	Ohio State
Billy McGill	C	Senior	Utah
Chet Walker	F	Senior	Bradley

Consensus Second Team
Player	Position	Class	Team
Jack Foley	G/F	Senior	Holy Cross
John Havlicek	F	Senior	Ohio State
Art Heyman	F	Junior	Duke
Cotton Nash	F	Sophomore	Kentucky
John Rudometkin	F	Senior	USC
Rod Thorn	G/F	Junior	West Virginia

== Individual All-America teams ==
All-America Team
All-America Team	First team		Second team		Third team	
All-America Team	Player	School	Player	School	Player	School
Associated Press	Len Chappell	Wake Forest	John Havlicek	Ohio State	Dave DeBusschere	Detroit
Associated Press	Terry Dischinger	Purdue	Art Heyman	Duke	Jack Foley	Holy Cross
Associated Press	Jerry Lucas	Ohio State	Cotton Nash	Kentucky	Paul Hogue	Cincinnati
Associated Press	Billy McGill	Utah	John Rudometkin	USC	Don Nelson	Iowa
Associated Press	Chet Walker	Bradley	Rod Thorn	West Virginia	Jimmy Rayl	Indiana
USBWA	Len Chappell	Wake Forest	No second or third teams (10-man first team)			
USBWA	Terry Dischinger	Purdue	No second or third teams (10-man first team)			
USBWA	Jack Foley	Holy Cross	No second or third teams (10-man first team)			
USBWA	John Havlicek	Ohio State	No second or third teams (10-man first team)			
USBWA	Art Heyman	Duke	No second or third teams (10-man first team)			
USBWA	Paul Hogue	Cincinnati	No second or third teams (10-man first team)			
USBWA	Jerry Lucas	Ohio State	No second or third teams (10-man first team)			
USBWA	Billy McGill	Utah	No second or third teams (10-man first team)			
USBWA	Cotton Nash	Kentucky	No second or third teams (10-man first team)			
USBWA	Chet Walker	Bradley	No second or third teams (10-man first team)			
NABC	Terry Dischinger	Purdue	Len Chappell	Wake Forest	Dave DeBusschere	Detroit
NABC	Jerry Lucas	Ohio State	Jack Foley	Holy Cross	Cornell Green	Utah State
NABC	Billy McGill	Utah	John Havlicek	Ohio State	Cotton Nash	Kentucky
NABC	John Rudometkin	USC	Art Heyman	Duke	Don Nelson	Iowa
NABC	Chet Walker	Bradley	Paul Hogue	Cincinnati	Rod Thorn	West Virginia
UPI	Terry Dischinger	Purdue	Len Chappell	Wake Forest	Dave DeBusschere	Detroit
UPI	John Havlicek	Ohio State	Jack Foley	Holy Cross	Paul Hogue	Cincinnati
UPI	Jerry Lucas	Ohio State	Art Heyman	Duke	Don Nelson	Iowa
UPI	Billy McGill	Utah	Cotton Nash	Kentucky	Jimmy Rayl	Indiana
UPI	Chet Walker	Bradley	Rod Thorn	West Virginia	John Rudometkin	USC
NEA	Len Chappell	Wake Forest	Dave DeBusschere	Detroit	No third team	
NEA	Terry Dischinger	Purdue	Jack Foley	Holy Cross	No third team	
NEA	Jerry Lucas	Ohio State	John Havlicek	Ohio State	No third team	
NEA	Billy McGill	Utah	Paul Hogue	Cincinnati	No third team	
NEA	Chet Walker	Bradley	John Rudometkin	USC	No third team	
Sporting News	Terry Dischinger	Purdue	Chris Appel	USC	No third team	
Sporting News	Jerry Lucas	Ohio State	Len Chappell	Wake Forest	No third team	
Sporting News	Billy McGill	Utah	John Havlicek	Ohio State	No third team	
Sporting News	Rod Thorn	West Virginia	Cotton Nash	Kentucky	No third team	
Sporting News	Chet Walker	Bradley	Hubie White	Villanova	No third team	

AP Honorable Mention:

- Chris Appel, USC
- Larry Armstrong, Arizona State
- Ed Bento, Loyola Marymount
- Carroll Broussard, Texas A&M
- Jay Carty, Oregon State
- Ken Charlton, Colorado
- Mel Counts, Oregon State
- Gary Daniels, The Citadel
- LeRoy Ellis, St. John's
- Dave Fedor, Florida State
- Bill Green, Colorado State
- Cornell Green, Utah State
- Jim Hadnot, Providence
- Bill Hanson, Washington
- Lyle Harger, Houston
- Jerry Harkness, Loyola–Chicago
- Walt Hazzard, UCLA
- Layton Johns, Auburn
- Bucky Keller, Virginia Tech
- Jim Kerwin, Tulane
- Clifford Luyk, Florida
- Jim McCormick, West Virginia
- Eddie Miles, Seattle
- Leland Mitchell, Mississippi State
- Mel Nowell, Ohio State
- Bud Olsen, Louisville
- Howard Pardue, Virginia Tech
- Larry Pursiful, Kentucky
- Bobby Rascoe, Western Kentucky
- Paul Silas, Creighton
- Jerry Smith, Furman
- Willie Somerset, Duquesne
- Red Stroud, Mississippi State
- Nate Thurmond, Bowling Green
- Ron Warner, Gettysburg
- Charlie Warren, Oregon
- Nick Werkman, Seton Hall
- Art Whisnant, South Carolina
- Hubie White, Villanova
- Granville Williams, Morehead State
- Mike Wroblewski, Kansas State

== See also ==
- 1961–62 NCAA University Division men's basketball season
