= 2003 Patriot League men's basketball tournament =

- Classification: Division I
- Season: 2002–03
- Teams: 8
- Site: The Show Place Arena; Upper Marlboro, Maryland
- Finals site: Hart Center; Worcester, Massachusetts
- Champions: Holy Cross (4th title)
- Winning coach: Ralph Willard (3rd title)
- MVP: Patrick Whearty (Holy Cross)

2002–03 Patriot League men's basketball standings
	Conf.				Overall
Team	W		L	PCT	W		L	PCT
Holy Cross †	13	–	1	.929	26	–	5	.839
American	9	–	5	.643	16	–	14	.533
Colgate	9	–	5	.643	14	–	14	.500
Lehigh	8	–	6	.571	16	–	12	.571
Bucknell	7	–	7	.500	14	–	15	.483
Lafayette	6	–	8	.429	13	–	16	.448
Navy	4	–	10	.286	8	–	20	.286
Army	0	–	14	.000	5	–	22	.185
† 2003 Patriot League tournament winner

The 2003 Patriot League men's basketball tournament was played at The Show Place Arena in Upper Marlboro, Maryland and Hart Center in Worcester, Massachusetts after the conclusion of the 2002–03 regular season. Top seed Holy Cross defeated #2 seed American, 72–64 in the championship game, to win its third straight (4th overall) Patriot League Tournament title. The Crusaders earned an automatic bid to the 2003 NCAA tournament as #14 seed in the Midwest region.

== Format ==
All eight league members participated in the tournament, with teams seeded according to regular season conference record.

== Bracket ==
Quarterfinals; March 8
1	Holy Cross	54
8	Army	40
4	Lehigh	47
5	Bucknell	52
3	Colgate	76
6	Lafayette	89
2	American	72
7	Navy	57

Semifinals; March 9
1	Holy Cross	75
5	Bucknell	50
6	Lafayette	55
2	American	74

Championship game March 14
1	Holy Cross	72
2	American	64
