= 2001 Patriot League men's basketball tournament =

- Classification: Division I
- Season: 2000–01
- Teams: 7
- Site: Alumni Hall; Annapolis, Maryland
- Finals site: Hart Center; Worcester, Massachusetts
- Champions: Holy Cross (2nd title)
- Winning coach: Ralph Willard (1st title)
- MVP: Josh Sankes (Holy Cross)

2000–01 Patriot League men's basketball standings
	Conf.				Overall
Team	W		L	PCT	W		L	PCT
Holy Cross †	10	–	2	.833	22	–	8	.733
Navy	9	–	3	.750	19	–	12	.613
Colgate	6	–	6	.500	13	–	15	.464
Lehigh	6	–	6	.500	13	–	16	.448
Lafayette	4	–	8	.333	12	–	16	.429
Bucknell	4	–	8	.333	14	–	15	.483
Army	3	–	9	.250	9	–	19	.321
† 2001 Patriot League tournament winner

The 2001 Patriot League men's basketball tournament was played at Alumni Hall in Annapolis, Maryland and Hart Center in Worcester, Massachusetts after the conclusion of the 2000–01 regular season. Top seed Holy Cross defeated #2 seed Navy, 68–64 (OT) in the championship game, to win its second Patriot League Tournament title. The Crusaders earned an automatic bid to the 2001 NCAA tournament as #15 seed in the East region.

== Format ==
All seven league members participated in the tournament, with teams seeded according to regular season conference record. Play began with the quarterfinal round, with the top seed receiving a bye to the semifinal round.

== Bracket ==
Quarterfinals; March 3
4	Lehigh	83
5	Lafayette	71
3	Colgate	68
6	Bucknell	75
2	Navy	92
7	Army	73

Semifinals; March 4
1	Holy Cross	69
4	Lehigh	57
6	Bucknell	64
2	Navy	88

Championship game March 9
1	Holy Cross	68*
2	Navy	64

* denotes overtime period
