= 1992–93 Holy Cross Crusaders men's basketball team =

American college basketball season

1992–93 Holy Cross Crusaders men's basketball

Patriot League tournament champions

NCAA tournament, first round
- Conference: Patriot League
- Record: 23–7 (12–2 Patriot)
- Head coach: George Blaney (21st season)
- Home arena: Hart Center

1992–93 Patriot League men's basketball standings
	Conf.				Overall
Team	W		L	PCT	W		L	PCT
Bucknell	13	–	1	.929	23	–	6	.793
Holy Cross †	12	–	2	.857	23	–	7	.767
Fordham	9	–	5	.643	15	–	16	.484
Colgate	9	–	5	.643	18	–	10	.643
Navy	5	–	9	.357	8	–	19	.296
Lafayette	4	–	10	.286	7	–	20	.259
Army	2	–	12	.143	4	–	22	.154
Lehigh	2	–	12	.143	4	–	23	.148
† 1993 Patriot League tournament winner

The 1992–93 Holy Cross Crusaders men's basketball team represented the College of the Holy Cross during the 1992–93 NCAA Division I men's basketball season. The Crusaders, led by head coach George Blaney, played their home games at the Hart Center and were members of the Patriot League. They finished the season 23–7, 12–2 in Patriot League play to finish in second place. They defeated Army, Fordham, and Bucknell to win the Patriot League tournament and earn the conference's automatic bid to the NCAA tournament. As No. 13 seed in the East region, they lost to Arkansas in the opening round, 94–64.

== Roster ==
1992–93 Holy Cross Crusaders men's basketball team
Players	Coaches
Pos. / # / Name / Height / Weight / Year / Previous school / Hometown; F / 24 / Rob Feaster / 6 ft 6 in (1.98 m) / 210 lb (95 kg) / So / Loyola Academy / Chicago, Illinois	Head coach: George Blaney; Assistant coach(es) Legend: (C) Team captain; (S) Suspended; (I) Ineligible; (W) Walk-on; Injured; Current redshirt; Roster

== Schedule and results ==
Date time, TV	Rank^{#}	Opponent^{#}	Result	Record	Site (attendance) city, state
Non-conference regular season
Dec 1, 1992*		at Harvard	W 92–72	1–0	Lavietes Pavilion (988); Cambridge, Massachusetts
Dec 5, 1992*		Siena	W 96–95	2–0	Hart Center (3,732); Worcester, Massachusetts
Dec 9, 1992*		at New Hampshire	W 76–63	3–0	Lundholm Gymnasium (585); Durham, New Hampshire
Dec 11, 1992*		at Penn	L 76–78	3–1	The Palestra (3,216); Philadelphia, Pennsylvania
Dec 21, 1992*		Northwestern	W 83–73	4–1	Hart Center (1,804); Worcester, Massachusetts
Dec 28, 1992*		vs. UMass; Abdow's Classic	L 66–81	4–2	Springfield Civic Center (8,052); Springfield, Massachusetts
Dec 29, 1992*		vs. UAB; Abdow's Classic	W 90–83	5–2	Springfield Civic Center (8,023); Springfield, Massachusetts
Jan 2, 1993*		Boston College	L 63–84	5–3	Hart Center (4,000); Worcester, Massachusetts
Jan 4, 1993*		at William & Mary	W 83–78	6–3	Kaplan Arena (1,235); Williamsburg, Virginia
Jan 6, 1993*		at Manhattan	L 70–74	6–4	Draddy Gymnasium (2,417); New York, New York
Patriot League regular season
Jan 9, 1993		Fordham	W 71–61	7–4 (1–0)	Hart Center (2,524); Worcester, Massachusetts
Jan 13, 1993		at Army	W 64–63	8–4 (2–0)	Christl Arena (605); West Point, New York
Jan 16, 1993		Lehigh	W 94–75	9–4 (3–0)	Hart Center (1,334); Worcester, Massachusetts
Jan 20, 1993		Colgate	W 78–68	10–4 (4–0)	Hart Center (3,012); Worcester, Massachusetts
Jan 23, 1993		at Lafayette	W 95–79	11–4 (5–0)	Kirby Sports Center (1,623); Easton, Pennsylvania
Jan 25, 1993*		Dartmouth	W 83–62	12–4	Hart Center (1,978); Worcester, Massachusetts
Jan 27, 1993		Navy	W 95–69	13–4 (6–0)	Hart Center (2,038); Worcester, Massachusetts
Jan 30, 1993		Bucknell	W 88–86	14–4 (7–0)	Hart Center (3,542); Worcester, Massachusetts
Feb 3, 1993		at Fordham	L 73–81	14–5 (7–1)	Rose Hill Gym (3,229); Bronx, New York
Feb 6, 1993		Army	W 110–73	15–5 (8–1)	Hart Center (3,261); Worcester, Massachusetts
Feb 8, 1993*		Rutgers	W 99–89	16–5	Hart Center (2,640); Worcester, Massachusetts
Feb 11, 1993		at Lehigh	W 104–87	17–5 (9–1)	Stabler Arena (1,128); Bethlehem, Pennsylvania
Feb 13, 1993		at Colgate	W 97–95	18–5 (10–1)	Cotterell Court (1,565); Hamilton, New York
Feb 17, 1993		Lafayette	W 95–68	19–5 (11–1)	Hart Center (3,105); Worcester, Massachusetts
Feb 20, 1993		at Navy	W 90–72	20–5 (12–1)	Alumni Hall (2,001); Annapolis, Maryland
Feb 27, 1993		at Bucknell	L 99–112	20–6 (12–2)	Davis Gym (2,500); Lewisburg, Pennsylvania
Patriot League tournament
Mar 3, 1993*		Army; Quarterfinals	W 85–68	21–6	Hart Center (1,624); Worcester, Massachusetts
Mar 6, 1993*		Fordham; Semifinals	W 86–78	22–6	Hart Center (1,667); Worcester, Massachusetts
Mar 10, 1993*		at Bucknell; Championship game	W 98–73	23–6	Davis Gym (2,500); Lewisburg, Pennsylvania
NCAA tournament
Mar 18, 1993*	(13 E)	vs. (4 E) No. 12 Arkansas; First Round	L 64–94	23–7	Lawrence Joel Coliseum (14,366); Winston-Salem, North Carolina
*Non-conference game. ^{#}Rankings from AP Poll. (#) Tournament seedings in parentheses. E=East. All times are in Eastern Time..
