= 2006–07 Holy Cross Crusaders men's basketball team =

American college basketball season

2006–07 Holy Cross Crusaders men's basketball

Patriot League regular season and tournament champions

NCAA tournament, First round
- Conference: Patriot League
- Record: 25–9 (13–1 Patriot)
- Head coach: Ralph Willard (8th season)
- Home arena: Hart Center

2006–07 Patriot League men's basketball standings
| | Conf. | | | | Overall |
| Team | W | | L | PCT | W | | L | PCT |
|---|---|---|---|---|---|---|---|---|
| Holy Cross † | 13 | – | 1 | .929 | 25 | – | 9 | .735 |
| Bucknell | 13 | – | 1 | .929 | 22 | – | 9 | .710 |
| Lehigh | 7 | – | 7 | .500 | 12 | – | 19 | .387 |
| American | 7 | – | 7 | .500 | 16 | – | 14 | .533 |
| Colgate | 5 | – | 9 | .357 | 10 | – | 19 | .345 |
| Army | 4 | – | 10 | .286 | 15 | – | 16 | .484 |
| Navy | 4 | – | 10 | .286 | 14 | – | 16 | .467 |
| Lafayette | 3 | – | 11 | .214 | 9 | – | 21 | .300 |
† 2007 Patriot League tournament winner

The 2006–07 Holy Cross Crusaders men's basketball team represented the College of the Holy Cross during the 2006–07 NCAA Division I men's basketball season. The Crusaders, led by 8th-year head coach Ralph Willard, played their home games at the Hart Center and were members of the Patriot League. They finished the season 25–9, 13–1 in Patriot League play to win the regular season league title. As the #1 seed, they defeated Lafayette, American, and Bucknell to be champions of the Patriot League tournament and earn the conference's automatic bid to the NCAA tournament. Playing as the No. 13 seed in the West region, they were beaten by No. 4 seed Southern Illinois.

== Roster ==
2006–07 Holy Cross Crusaders men's basketball team
Players
Coaches

| Pos. | # | Name | Height | Weight | Year | Previous school | Hometown |
|---|---|---|---|---|---|---|---|
| G | 1 | Torey Thomas | 5 ft 11 in (1.8 m) | 185 lb (84 kg) | Sr | | White Plains, New York |
| G | 10 | Keith Simmons | 6 ft 5 in (1.96 m) | 205 lb (93 kg) | Sr | Kingston | Kingston, New York |

Head coach

- Ralph Willard

Assistant coach(es)

Legend

- (C) Team captain
- (S) Suspended
- (I) Ineligible
- (W) Walk-on
- Injured
- Current redshirt

== Schedule and results ==
| Date time, TV | Rank^{#} | Opponent^{#} | Result | Record | Site (attendance) city, state |
Non-conference regular season
| Nov 12, 2006*; 4:00 pm | | Fairfield | W 67–65 ^{OT} | 1–0 | Hart Recreation Center (2,534); Worcester, Massachusetts |
| Nov 15, 2006*; 7:00 pm | | Hampton | W 62–47 | 2–0 | Hart Recreation Center (2,213); Worcester, Massachusetts |
| Nov 18, 2006*; 3:00 pm | | Siena | W 65–57 | 3–0 | Hart Recreation Center (2,721); Worcester, Massachusetts |
| Nov 21, 2006*; 7:00 pm | | at Harvard | W 82–69 | 4–0 | Lavietes Pavilion (1,200); Cambridge, Massachusetts |
| Nov 25, 2006*; 2:00 pm | | William & Mary | W 66–57 | 5–0 | Hart Recreation Center (2,301); Worcester, Massachusetts |
| Nov 27, 2006*; 7:00 pm, ESPNU | | at No. 15 Syracuse | L 64–72 | 5–1 | Carrier Dome (19,235); Syracuse, New York |
| Nov 29, 2006*; 7:00 pm | | at Yale | W 63–58 | 6–1 | John J. Lee Amphitheater (1,028); New Haven, Connecticut |
| Dec 2, 2006*; 7:00 pm | | at Dayton | L 53–69 | 6–2 | University of Dayton Arena (12,149); Dayton, Ohio |
| Dec 6, 2006*; 7:00 pm, ESPN2 | | at No. 7 Duke | L 45–57 | 6–3 | Cameron Indoor Stadium (9,314); Durham, North Carolina |
| Dec 19, 2006*; 7:30 pm | | at Providence | L 68–77 | 6–4 | Dunkin' Donuts Center (7,785); Providence, Rhode Island |
| Dec 21, 2006*; 7:00 pm | | vs. George Mason | L 46–58 | 6–5 | DCU Center (3,114); Worcester, Massachusetts |
| Dec 28, 2006*; 6:00 pm | | at La Salle; La Salle Invitational | W 68–48 | 7–5 | Tom Gola Arena (1,837); Philadelphia, Pennsylvania |
| Dec 29, 2006*; 8:15 pm | | vs. Niagara; La Salle Invitational | L 61–67 | 7–6 | Tom Gola Arena (1,531); Philadelphia, Pennsylvania |
| Dec 30, 2006*; 4:00 pm | | vs. Delaware; La Salle Invitational | W 49–47 | 8–6 | Tom Gola Arena (2,522); Philadelphia, Pennsylvania |
| Jan 3, 2007*; 7:00 pm | | at Boston University | W 73–70 ^{OT} | 9–6 | Case Gym (1,025); Boston, Massachusetts |
Patriot League regular season
| Jan 6, 2007; 4:00 pm | | at Lafayette | W 84–74 | 10–6 (1–0) | Kirby Sports Center (2,503); Easton, Pennsylvania |
| Jan 9, 2007; 7:00 pm, WCTR-TV3 | | Army | W 66–42 | 11–6 (2–0) | Hart Recreation Center (2,412); Worcester, Massachusetts |
| Jan 12, 2007; 7:00 pm, ESPNU | | Bucknell | W 65–60 | 12–6 (3–0) | Hart Recreation Center (3,523); Worcester, Massachusetts |
| Jan 17, 2007; 7:00 pm | | Navy | W 61–42 | 13–6 (4–0) | Hart Recreation Center (3,137); Worcester, Massachusetts |
| Jan 20, 2007; 3:00 pm | | at American | W 69–64 ^{OT} | 14–6 (5–0) | Bender Arena (4,775); Washington D.C. |
| Jan 23, 2007; 7:00 pm | | at Colgate | W 58–55 | 15–6 (6–0) | Cotterell Court (543); Hamilton, New York |
| Jan 26, 2007; 9:00 pm, ESPNU | | Lehigh | W 64–53 | 16–6 (7–0) | Hart Recreation Center (3,487); Worcester, Massachusetts |
| Jan 31, 2007; 7:00 pm, WCTR-TV3 | | American | W 58–47 | 17–6 (8–0) | Hart Recreation Center (3,118); Worcester, Massachusetts |
| Feb 3, 2007; 1:00 pm | | Lafayette | W 64–53 | 18–6 (8–0) | Hart Recreation Center (4,000); Worcester, Massachusetts |
| Feb 6, 2007; 7:30 pm | | at Army | W 70–54 ^{OT} | 19–6 (9–0) | Christl Arena (1,002); West Point, New York |
| Feb 26, 2007; 7:00 pm, ESPNU | | at Bucknell | L 45–48 | 19–7 (9–1) | Sojka Pavilion (4,209); Lewisburg, Pennsylvania |
| Feb 26, 2007; 4:00 pm | | at Navy | W 68–40 | 20–7 (10–1) | Alumni Hall (1,414); Annapolis, Maryland |
| Feb 17, 2007; 3:00 pm, ESPNU | | at Hofstra; O'Reilly ESPNU BracketBusters | L 64–65 | 20–8 | Mack Sports Complex (5,047); Hempstead, New York |
| Feb 21, 2007; 7:00 pm | | Colgate | W 68–57 | 22–8 (12–1) | Hart Recreation Center (3,178); Worcester, Massachusetts |
| Feb 25, 2007; 1:00 pm | | at Lehigh | W 62–50 | 22–8 (13–1) | Stabler Arena (2,439); Bethlehem, Pennsylvania |
Patriot League Tournament
| Feb 28, 2007*; 7:00 pm | | Lafayette; Quarterfinals | W 83–53 | 23–8 | Hart Recreation Center (2,524); Worcester, Massachusetts |
| Mar 4, 2007*; 2:00 pm | | American; Semifinals | W 55–53 | 24–8 | Hart Recreation Center (3,463); Worcester, Massachusetts |
| Mar 9, 2007*; 4:45 pm, ESPN2 | | Bucknell; Championship game | W 74–66 | 25–8 | Hart Recreation Center (4,000); Worcester, Massachusetts |
NCAA Tournament
| Mar 16, 2007*; 9:50 pm, CBS | (13 W) | vs. (4 W) No. 14 Southern Illinois; First Round | L 51–61 | 25–9 | Nationwide Arena (19,916); Columbus, Ohio |
*Non-conference game. ^{#}Rankings from AP Poll. (#) Tournament seedings in parentheses. W=West Region. All times are in Eastern Time..
