= Jack Foley (basketball) =

American basketball player (1939–2020)

Personal information
- Born: April 19, 1939 Worcester, Massachusetts, U.S.
- Died: November 29, 2020 (aged 81) Worcester, Massachusetts, U.S.
- Listed height: 6 ft 3 in (1.91 m)
- Listed weight: 170 lb (77 kg)

Career information
- High school: Assumption (Worcester, Massachusetts)
- College: Holy Cross (1959–1962)
- NBA draft: 1962: 2nd round, 16th overall pick
- Drafted by: Boston Celtics
- Playing career: 1962–1963
- Position: Forward
- Number: 21, 7

Career history
- 1962–1963: Boston Celtics
- 1963: New York Knicks

Career highlights
- Consensus second-team All-American (1962); No. 32 retired by Holy Cross Crusaders; First-team Parade All-American (1958)
- Stats at NBA.com
- Stats at Basketball Reference

John E. Foley (April 19, 1939 – November 29, 2020) was an American professional basketball player for the Boston Celtics and New York Knicks of the National Basketball Association (NBA). He was selected in the second round as the 18th pick in the 1962 NBA draft by the Celtics and spent one season playing in the league. Foley was given the nickname "the Shot" because of his explosive offensive ability.

A native of Worcester, Massachusetts, Foley attended Assumption High School, where he graduated in 1958. He decided to stay close to home when playing college basketball and enrolled at the College of the Holy Cross. Since college freshmen were ineligible to participate on varsity teams, Foley's college career did not officially begin until 1959–60. In his three seasons as a Crusader, he scored so many points that his nickname, "the Shot", was what he was commonly referred to. In his sophomore season, Foley averaged 24.6 points per game (ppg), followed by 26.9 ppg and 33.3 ppg during his junior and senior seasons, respectively. In his senior year of 1961–62, he finished second in the nation in scoring behind Utah's Bill McGill (38.8 ppg). That season, Foley garnered consensus Second Team All-American honors. In addition to his high season scoring averages, Foley also put up big single game numbers. He is the record holder of the two highest scoring games in school history—56 points against Connecticut in 1962 and 55 against Colgate in 1960—as well as having scored 40 or more points five times in his career. Foley became the first player in school history to score 2,000 career points, and his 2,185 points was the most in school history until the early 1980s.

Foley's professional career was not spectacular, especially compared to his college career. He played in five total games for the Celtics in 1962–63, averaging 6.4 points, before being sold to the New York Knicks on January 22, 1963. He then played in six games for the Knicks and averaged 3.5 points. For his career, Foley scored 53 points, grabbed 16 rebounds and recorded 5 assists.

Following his basketball career, Foley became a high school teacher and girls' basketball coach. He died from Parkinson's disease on November 29, 2020, at his home in Worcester.

== Career statistics ==
Legend
GP	Games played	GS	Games started	MPG	Minutes per game
FG%	Field goal percentage	3P%	3-point field goal percentage	FT%	Free throw percentage
RPG	Rebounds per game	APG	Assists per game	SPG	Steals per game
BPG	Blocks per game	PPG	Points per game	**Bold**	Career high

=== NBA ===
==== Regular season ====
Year	Team	GP	MPG	FG%	FT%	RPG	APG	PPG
1962–63	Boston	5	**9.2**	**.500**	.750	1.4	.0	**6.4**
1962–63	New York	**6**	6.2	.280	**1.000**	**1.5**	**.8**	3.5
Career		11	7.5	.392	.857	1.5	.5	4.8
