= John Rudometkin =

American basketball player (1940–2015)

Personal information
- Born: June 6, 1940 Santa Maria, California, U.S.
- Died: August 4, 2015 (aged 75) Newcastle, California, U.S.
- Listed height: 6 ft 6 in (1.98 m)
- Listed weight: 205 lb (93 kg)

Career information
- High school: Santa Maria (Santa Maria, California)
- College: Allan Hancock (1958–1959); USC (1959–1962)
- NBA draft: 1962: 2nd round, 9th overall pick
- Drafted by: New York Knicks
- Playing career: 1962–1965
- Position: Small forward
- Number: 18, 34

Career history
- 1962–1964: New York Knicks
- 1964: San Francisco Warriors

Career highlights
- Consensus second-team All-American (1962); Second-team All-American – UPI (1961); Third-team All-American – AP, NABC, NEA (1961); 2× First-team All-AAWU (1961, 1962); No. 44 retired by USC Trojans; Fourth-team Parade All-American (1958)
- Stats at NBA.com
- Stats at Basketball Reference
- Collegiate Basketball Hall of Fame

John Rudometkin (June 6, 1940 – August 4, 2015) was an American professional basketball player for the New York Knicks and San Francisco Warriors in the National Basketball Association (NBA). He was selected in the second round as the 11th pick in the 1962 NBA draft by the Knicks and spent three seasons playing in the league. Rudometkin was nicknamed "the Reckless Russian" by Chick Hearn, the Los Angeles Lakers broadcaster who used to broadcast USC men's basketball games before transitioning to the NBA.

== College ==
Before attending the University of Southern California, Rudometkin spent one year playing basketball at Allan Hancock College, a junior college located in his hometown of Santa Maria, California. He averaged 18.2 points per game (ppg) in 30 games during the 1958–59 season.

Rudometkin then enrolled at USC in the fall of 1959 to play for the Trojans. As a 6 ft 6 in (1.98 m) center, he went on to have a highly successful career in college. In his three varsity seasons at the NCAA Division I institution, Rudometkin held career averages of 18.8 points and 10.5 rebounds in 79 games played. He scored 1,434 points, which stood as the school record for 23 years, and his 18.8 average is still the best career average at USC. In 1961, he led the Trojans to an outright conference title, which through 2009–10 remains their most recent outright conference championship. In all three seasons Rudometkin led the team in scoring and was named the team MVP, and as a senior in 1961–62 he was named a consensus second-team All-American.

== Professional ==
After his college career ended, Rudometkin was selected in the second round as the 11th overall pick by the New York Knicks in the 1962 NBA draft. He spent the 1962–63, 1963–64, and part of the 1964–65 seasons playing for the Knicks until he was signed as a free agent on February 2, 1965, by the San Francisco Warriors, with whom he subsequently finished the season (and his career). Although Rudometkin played the center position in college, he was moved to play forward in the NBA. In three professional seasons, Rudometkin averaged 6.3 points, 3.1 rebounds and 0.5 assists per game.

== Personal ==
After only three seasons, Rudometkin was forced to prematurely retire from basketball. His stamina weakened noticeably and doctors could not initially determine the cause. He was diagnosed with non-Hodgkin's lymphoma, a diverse group of blood cancers that include any kind of lymphoma except Hodgkin's lymphoma. He spent years in treatment, which caused total hair loss, temporary paralysis and the need to learn to walk all over again. Rudometkin eventually went into remission and cited both medicine and his faith as reasons why he was able to survive the tumor which had encircled his lungs and heart.

After his ordeal, Rudometkin married, had three sons, wrote a book about his experiences and traveled the country as a motivational speaker. He also spent time as a real estate investor and minister. Towards the end of his life, he resided in Newcastle, California, with his wife of roughly 50 years, and required an oxygen tank to help him breathe. Rudometkin died on August 4, 2015, from chronic lung disease.

== Career statistics ==
Legend
GP	Games played	GS	Games started	MPG	Minutes per game
FG%	Field goal percentage	3P%	3-point field goal percentage	FT%	Free throw percentage
RPG	Rebounds per game	APG	Assists per game	SPG	Steals per game
BPG	Blocks per game	PPG	Points per game	**Bold**	Career high

=== NBA ===
==== Regular season ====
Year	Team	GP	MPG	FG%	FT%	RPG	APG	PPG
1962–63	New York	**56**	10.2	.352	**.768**	2.7	.5	5.2
1963–64	New York	52	13.4	**.472**	.750	3.2	.5	**7.6**
1964–65	New York	1	**22.0**	.375	–	**7.0**	.0	6.0
1964–65	San Francisco	22	16.1	.336	.680	4.2	**.7**	6.0
Career		131	12.5	.399	.743	3.1	.5	6.3
