= Ralph Willard =

American former basketball coach (born 1946)

Biographical details
- Born: March 28, 1946 (age 80); Brooklyn, New York, U.S.

Playing career
- 1964–1967: Holy Cross
- Position: Guard

Coaching career (HC unless noted)
- 1971–1972: Merchant Marine (assistant)
- 1972–1984: St. Dominic HS
- 1984–1985: Hofstra (assistant)
- 1986–1987: Syracuse (assistant)
- 1987–1989: New York Knicks (assistant)
- 1989–1990: Kentucky (associate HC)
- 1990–1994: Western Kentucky
- 1994–1999: Pittsburgh
- 1999–2009: Holy Cross
- 2009–2010: Louisville (assistant)

Administrative career (AD unless noted)
- 2010–2011: Louisville (dir. of operations)

Head coaching record
- Overall: 336–241
- Tournaments: 2–6 (NCAA Division I); 2–3 (NIT)

Accomplishments and honors

Championships
- Sun Belt tournament (1993); Sun Belt regular season (1994); 4 Patriot League regular season (2001, 2003, 2005, 2007); 4 Patriot League tournament (2001–2003, 2007)

Awards
- 3× Patriot League Coach of the Year (2001, 2005, 2007)

Ralph Daniel Willard (born March 28, 1946) is an American former basketball coach. He served as the head men's basketball coach at Western Kentucky University from 1990 to 1994, the University of Pittsburgh from 1994 to 1999, and the College of the Holy Cross from 1999 to 2009, compiling a career college basketball coaching record of 336–241. Willard was also an assistant athletic director at Holy Cross.

== Career ==
After graduating from Holy Cross, Willard was drafted to the United States Army. Willard finished basic training when negotiations began for the Paris Peace Accords, so Willard was reassigned to Fort Benning instead of being sent overseas to Vietnam. At Fort Benning, Willard assisted soldiers receiving treatment for wartime injuries with paperwork.

After serving in the Army, Willard returned to his alma mater, St. Dominic High School in Oyster Bay, New York, to be a physical education teacher. His first coaching job was as an assistant coach at the Merchant Marine Academy during the 1971–72 season. From 1972 to 1984, Willard was a coach at St. Dominic High. During his tenure there he led his team to the 1980 state championship, posted a 162–89 record, and earned five conference coach of the year honors.

After leaving St. Dominic, Willard became the assistant coach at Hofstra University. When Willard left Hofstra, he became a member of the Syracuse University staff that appeared in the NCAA national championship game in 1987.

Willard briefly joined Rick Pitino as a member of the staff of the National Basketball Association's New York Knicks. When Pitino left to become the head coach of the University of Kentucky, Willard joined him as the associate head coach in 1989.

In 1990 Willard was given his first college head coaching job at Western Kentucky University where he stayed until 1994. Within three years Willard led Western Kentucky to a Top 25 national ranking and an appearance in the NCAA Sweet 16.

In 1994 Willard became the head coach of the University of Pittsburgh Panthers men's basketball team. He held this position until 1999 when he returned to his college alma mater at Holy Cross where he had been a member of the class of 1967 and the captain of the 1966–1967 men's basketball team.

=== Holy Cross ===
Willard began his tenure at Holy Cross with the goal of turning around a struggling program. The school had only won 22 games in its three previous seasons combined. In only his second season, Willard managed to lead the Crusaders to both the regular season and tournament titles. As a result, he was named the Coach of the Year for the Patriot League. Willard's success at Holy Cross continued as he led the school to two more conference titles and subsequent trips to the NCAA tournament in 2002 and 2003.

In 2005, Holy Cross was invited to the National Invitation Tournament where Willard led the team to the second round with a victory over the University of Notre Dame. Willard was honored for the second time as the Patriot League coach of the year. He also received national recognition when he was named as a finalist for the Jim Phelan National Coach of the Year award.

In 2007, Willard led Holy Cross back to the NCAA Tournament with another Patriot League conference title. This once again earned him coach of the year honors for the Patriot League. During his tenure as the school's head coach, the Crusaders averaged more than 19 victories per season and advanced to the conference tournament championship game six times.

=== After Holy Cross ===
On June 10, 2009, Willard became an associate head coach with the University of Louisville to team once again with longtime personal friend Rick Pitino. The following season, Willard became director of operations at Louisville.

From 2011 to 2013, Willard was a consultant back at Holy Cross. In the 2013–14 season, Willard scouted for the Oklahoma City Thunder.

Prior to the 2015–16 season, Willard signed a one-year contract but took a leave of absence in October 2015 for health reasons.

== Personal life ==
Willard is married to the former Dorothy Schreiber and has three children, including college basketball coach Kevin Willard, who was head coach at Seton Hall from 2010 to 2022, Currently at Villanova 2025+ and also was the head coach at Maryland. The Willards have lived in Bonita Springs, Florida since around 2012.

In 2005, Willard was diagnosed with prostate cancer. In 2008, he underwent robot-assisted open heart surgery to repair a leaking mitral valve. He has successfully recovered from both and continues to coach today.

== Head coaching record ==
=== College ===
Record table
Season	Team	Overall	Conference	Standing	Postseason
Western Kentucky Hilltoppers (Sun Belt Conference) (1990–1994)
1990–91	Western Kentucky	14–14	8–6	T–3rd	
1991–92	Western Kentucky	21–11	10–6	4th	NIT First Round
1992–93	Western Kentucky	26–6	14–4	2nd	NCAA Division I Sweet 16
1993–94	Western Kentucky	20–11	14–4	1st	NCAA Division I First Round
Western Kentucky:		81–42 (.659)	46–20 (.697)		
Pittsburgh Panthers (Big East Conference) (1994–1999)
1994–95	Pittsburgh	10–18	5–13	9th	
1995–96	Pittsburgh	10–17	5–13	7th (BE 7)	
1996–97	Pittsburgh	18–15	10–8	T–2nd (BE 7)	NIT Second Round
1997–98	Pittsburgh	11–16	6–12	T–5th (BE 7)	
1998–99	Pittsburgh	14–16	5–13	9th	
Pittsburgh:		63–82 (.434)	31–59 (.344)		
Holy Cross Crusaders (Patriot League) (1999–2009)
1999–00	Holy Cross	10–18	3–9	T–5th	
2000–01	Holy Cross	22–8	10–2	1st	NCAA Division I First Round
2001–02	Holy Cross	18–15	9–5	2nd	NCAA Division I First Round
2002–03	Holy Cross	26–5	13–1	1st	NCAA Division I First Round
2003–04	Holy Cross	13–15	7–7	5th	
2004–05	Holy Cross	25–7	13–1	1st	NIT Second Round
2004–05	Holy Cross	20–12	11–3	T–2nd	
2006–07	Holy Cross	25–9	13–1	T–1st	NCAA Division I First Round
2007–08	Holy Cross	15–14	5–9	8th	
2008–09	Holy Cross	18–14	11–3	2nd	
Holy Cross:		192–117 (.621)	95–41 (.699)		
Total:		336–241 (.582)			
National champion Postseason invitational champion Conference regular season champion Conference regular season and conference tournament champion Division regular season champion Division regular season and conference tournament champion Conference tournament champion
