= Jim McCaffrey (basketball) =

American basketball player

Personal information
- Born: Rutland, Vermont, U.S.
- Listed height: 6 ft 2 in (1.88 m)
- Listed weight: 180 lb (82 kg)

Career information
- High school: Rutland (Rutland, Vermont)
- College: Saint Michael's (1981–1983); Holy Cross (1984–1986)
- NBA draft: 1986: 6th round, 123rd overall pick
- Drafted by: Phoenix Suns
- Playing career: 1987–1988
- Position: Guard

Career history
- 1987–1988: Cincinnati Slammers

Career highlights
- 2× First-team All-MAAC (1985, 1986); MAAC tournament MVP (1986)
- Stats at Basketball Reference

James McCaffrey is a former basketball player who played collegiately at Holy Cross and was a 6th round selection in the 1986 NBA draft. A native of Rutland, Vermont, he was named one of Sports Illustrated's Greatest Sports Figures from the State of Vermont.

== High school career ==
McCaffrey attended and played for Rutland High School, and is credited with scoring 1,111 points across two varsity seasons. During his time playing for the Red Raiders, they achieved back-to-back state title game appearances at Patrick Gym. McCaffrey scored 55 points in one game in 1981, which is the fifth all-time in the history of Vermont high school boys basketball. He also set a single-game state tournament scoring record with a 48-point performance and earned all-state honors, averaging 30 points per game.

== College career ==
McCaffrey spent the first two seasons of his college career at in-state institution St. Michael's College where he led the team in scoring for two seasons, including 21 points per game in his second year. McCaffrey transferred to Holy Cross and in his first season with the Crusaders, averaged 21.7 points per game en route to Metro Atlantic Athletic Conference first-team all-conference honors. In his senior season, McCaffrey's scoring average climbed to 22.8 points per game and he was named tournament MVP of the 1986 MAAC men's basketball tournament, as well as picking up first-team all-conference honors.

McCaffrey set the Hart Center scoring record with a 46-point performance against Iona in 1985, which earned him Sports Illustrated Player of the Week Honors. He finished his Holy Cross career with 1,178 points and as of 2023, ranks 4th all-time in scoring average (22.2), 6th all-time in free-throw percentage (.808), and is the all-time leader in average minutes played per game (35.5).

== Post-college ==
After college, McCaffrey was taken in the sixth round of the 1986 NBA draft by the Phoenix Suns. He was released in training camp by the Suns and also attended camp with the Boston Celtics. McCaffrey played the 1987 season with the Cincinnati Slammers of the Continental Basketball Association and also played in the United States Basketball League.

He appeared in a Nestlé Crunch ad alongside Larry Bird after graduating from college, playing the role of a custodian. McCaffrey was inducted into the Holy Cross Athletic Hall of Fame in 1992 and the New England Basketball Hall of Fame in 2003. He was also a member of the Vermont Sports Hall of Fame Class of 2015.

== Personal life ==
McCaffrey currently works in the finance industry in London. His children were all collegiate athletes; one son, James, played football at Boston College, while his younger son, Mike, played at Holy Cross. McCaffrey's daughter, Stephanie, was a women's soccer player at Boston College, and is a former professional and international soccer player.
