= Rob Feaster =

American basketball player (born 1973)

Personal information
- Born: May 15, 1973 (age 53)
- Listed height: 6 ft 6 in (1.98 m)
- Listed weight: 220 lb (100 kg)

Career information
- High school: Loyola Academy (Wilmette, Illinois)
- College: Holy Cross (1991–1995)
- NBA draft: 1995: undrafted
- Playing career: 1996–2007
- Position: Small forward

Career history
- 1996–1997: Hamburg
- 1997–1998: Bayreuth
- 1998: Boca Juniors
- 1998–1999: Rochester Skeeters
- 2000–2001: La Crosse Bobcats
- 2001–2003: Perth Wildcats
- 2003–2004: Victoria Giants
- 2005–2006: Reims Champagne Basket
- 2006–2007: Stade Clermontois BA

Career highlights
- All-NBL Second Team (2003); IBA Sixth Man of the Year (1999); Patriot League Player of the Year (1995); 3× First-team All-Patriot League (1993–1995); Patriot League tournament MVP (1993); Patriot League Rookie of the Year (1992); Patriot League All-Rookie Team (1992)

Robert M. Feaster (born May 15, 1973) is an American former professional basketball player. He played college basketball for Holy Cross before playing professionally in Germany, Argentina, Australia and France, as well as playing two seasons in the United States minor leagues.

== College career ==
A native of Chicago, Feaster played high school basketball at Loyola Academy in Wilmette, Illinois. Feaster's college career at Holy Cross began in 1991–92. In 29 games, he averaged 8.0 points and 3.2 rebounds and was named the Patriot League Rookie of the Year. He followed that campaign with a sophomore season in which the Crusaders placed second in the conference regular season, won the Patriot League tournament, and earned a berth in the 1993 NCAA tournament. Feaster led the team in scoring at 17.7 points per game for the season and was also named the conference tournament's most valuable player. It was Holy Cross' first NCAA Tournament appearance since the 1979–80 season, and with a 24–7 record, just their third 20-win season since then as well.

As a junior in 1993–94, Feaster averaged 28.0 points per game, which placed him second in the nation behind Purdue's Glenn Robinson. Despite the prolific scoring, the Crusaders only finished with a 14–14 record. He was selected to the All-Patriot League team for the second straight year. Feaster's final season in 1994–95 saw him earn his third all-conference selection behind a third consecutive season in which he led Holy Cross in scoring at 25.0 points per game. This mark also ranked him ninth nationally, and for his efforts he was named the Patriot League Player of the Year. When Feaster finished his college career, he had scored a then-Patriot League record 2,224 points (in 2012–13, his record would be broken by Lehigh's CJ McCollum). Despite setting the conference scoring record, he still only ranks second all-time at Holy Cross. Ron Perry scored 2,524 points between 1976–77 and 1979–80.

== Professional career ==
Feaster went undrafted in the 1995 NBA draft. Between 1996 and 1998, he played in Germany. After a one-game stint with Boca Juniors in Argentina to begin the 1998–99 season, he returned to the United States, where he won IBA Sixth Man of the Year honors with the Rochester Skeeters. After not playing during the 1999–2000 season, he spent the 2000–01 season with the La Crosse Bobcats of the Continental Basketball Association. For the 2001–02 season, he played in Australia with the Perth Wildcats. He continued on with the Wildcats in 2002–03, helping Perth reach the NBL Grand Final series, where they lost 2–0 to the Sydney Kings. That year, he earned Wildcats Club MVP honors and was named to the All-NBL Second Team. He remained in Australia for the 2003–04 season, joining the Victoria Giants. In January 2005, he joined French team Reims Champagne Basket. He continued on with Reims for the 2005–06 season, before playing eight games for Stade Clermontois BA during the 2006–07 season.
