= Kevin Hamilton (basketball) =

American basketball player

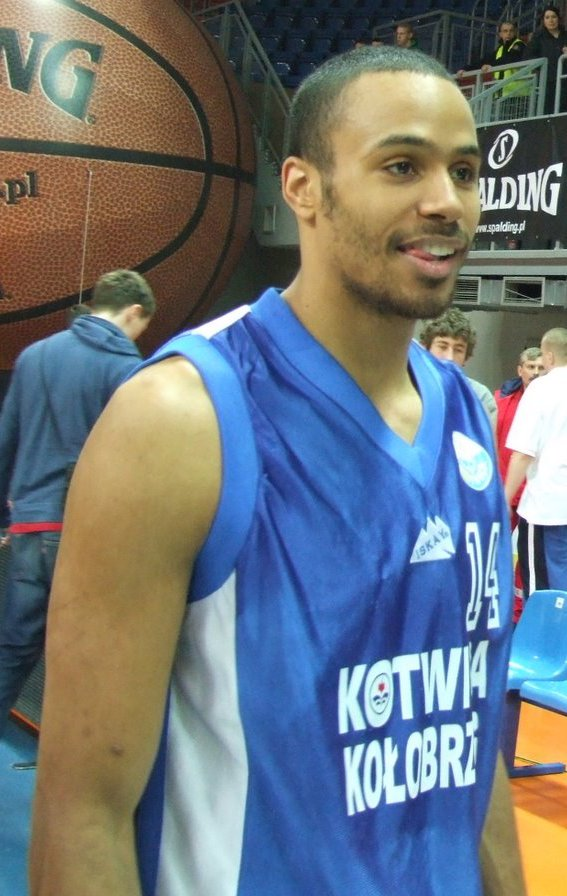

Personal information
- Born: May 2, 1984 (age 42) Queens, New York, U.S.
- Listed height: 6 ft 4 in (1.93 m)
- Listed weight: 190 lb (86 kg)

Career information
- High school: Archbishop Molloy (Queens, New York)
- College: Holy Cross (2002–2006)
- NBA draft: 2006: undrafted
- Playing career: 2006–2016
- Position: Point guard
- Number: 14

Career history
- 2006–2007: Polpak Swiecie
- 2007: Cariduros de Fajardo
- 2007–2008: Besançon BCD
- 2008: Cariduros de Fajardo
- 2008–2009: SKK Kotwica Kołobrzeg
- 2009: Indios de Mayagüez
- 2009–2011: New Yorker Phantoms Braunschweig
- 2011–2014: Indios de Mayagüez
- 2011–2014: Bayreuth
- 2014–2015: Rouen
- 2015–2016: Cangrejeros de Santurce

Career highlights
- Polish Cup champion (2009); Polish League All-Star (2009); AP honorable mention All-American (2005); Patriot League Player of the Year (2005); Patriot League Defensive Player of the Year (2006); 2× First-team All-Patriot League (2005, 2006); Second-team All-Patriot League (2004)

Kevin Bernard Hamilton Jr. (born May 2, 1984) is an American retired professional basketball player. In college, Hamilton was an honorable mention All-American and the 2005 Patriot League Player of the Year as a junior at Holy Cross.

== College ==
Hamilton played for the Holy Cross Crusaders from 2002 to 2006. During his four-year career, the team were two-team Patriot League regular season champions (2003, 2005) and one-time Patriot League tournament champions (2003). A 6'4" point guard, Hamilton averaged 12.2 points, 4.7 rebounds, 2.5 assists, and 2.4 steals per game for his career. He earned second-team All-Patriot League honors as a sophomore, then repeated as a first-team selection in his junior and senior years. As a junior in 2004–05, Hamilton led the Crusaders to a regular season championship behind averages of 15.7 points, 5.7 rebounds, 2.8 assists, and 2.9 steals per game. He was named the Patriot League Player of the Year and earned national recognition as an Associated Press honorable mention All-American. The following season (his final year), Hamilton did not repeat as the conference player of the year but he did win the Patriot League Defensive Player of the Year award. He also ranked fifth in NCAA Division steals per game as a senior. In his final two seasons, Hamilton led the Patriot League in both scoring and steals. Hamilton's 292 career steals were both Holy Cross and Patriot League records at the time of his graduation.

In 2013, Holy Cross inducted Hamilton into their athletics hall of fame. In 2015, the Patriot League named him to their 25th Anniversary Team, celebrating the best 25 players in league history to that point.

== Professional ==
After going undrafted in the 2006 NBA draft, Hamilton embarked on a 10-year international professional career. He played for clubs in Poland, Puerto Rico, Germany, and France. His most successful season as a pro came in 2008–09, when he was named a Polish League All-Star and his team won the Polish Cup.
