= Tim Szatko =

American basketball player

Personal information
- Born: May 27, 1981 (age 45)
- Listed height: 6 ft 8 in (2.03 m)
- Listed weight: 220 lb (100 kg)

Career information
- High school: Naperville Central (Naperville, Illinois)
- College: Holy Cross (1999–2003)
- NBA draft: 2003: undrafted
- Playing career: 2004–2005
- Position: Power forward
- Number: 4

Career history
- 2004–2005: Casino Figueira Ginasio

Career highlights
- AP Honorable mention All-American (2001); Patriot League Player of the Year (2001); 2× First-team All-Patriot League (2001, 2002); Patriot League Rookie of the Year (2000); Patriot League All-Rookie Team (2000); Patriot League tournament MVP (2002)

Timothy S. Szatko (born May 27, 1981) is an American former basketball player. He played college basketball at Holy Cross between 1999 and 2003. He was a two-time first-team all-conference selection, the 2001 Patriot League Player of the Year, and the 2002 Patriot League tournament MVP. He had a brief stint playing professionally following his time at Holy Cross.

== High school and college careers ==
Szatko grew up in Naperville, Illinois and graduated from Naperville Central High School in 1999. As a senior in 1998–99 he averaged 23 points and 10 rebounds per game and was named the DuPage County Player of the Year. Despite the success, he garnered no interest from "major" colleges. Szatko initially planned to walk on at Notre Dame, but one month later he visited mid-major Holy Cross in Worcester, Massachusetts and knew immediately that was where he wanted to play. He said, "Holy Cross just felt like home, like where I was supposed to be. At Notre Dame guys like Troy Murphy would have played in front of me. I might not have touched the floor there."

At 6'8", Szatko played the power forward position. His Holy Cross freshman campaign saw him average 11.4 points and 5.9 rebounds per game. He earned a spot on the Patriot League All-Rookie Team and was also named the Patriot League Rookie of the Year. The following season, he averaged 11.4 points and 6.5 rebounds per game. The Crusaders won the regular season and conference tournament championships, and Szatko was honored as the Patriot League Player of the Year. He became just the second sophomore in league history to win the award, after Adonal Foyle in 1996. Szatko earned a spot on the All-Patriot League first team, and also garnered national recognition as an honorable mention All-American.

In his junior year in 2001–02, Szatko repeated as a first-team all-conference performer. He averaged career-highs of 13.6 points and 6.7 rebounds while leading Holy Cross to a second consecutive NCAA tournament berth. Although Holy Cross finished in second place during regular season Patriot League play, the Crusaders won their second consecutive conference tournament with Szatko earning tournament MVP honors. In his final collegiate season, Holy Cross won their second regular season and third consecutive conference tournament championships en route to a third straight NCAA Tournament appearance. Szatko's statistics dipped slightly; he averaged 11.4 points and 6.4 rebounds per game. For the first season in his career he did not earn any Patriot League awards or honors. His overall career, however, saw him graduate as one of the most decorated players in league history. In 2015, Szatko was named to the Patriot League's 25th Anniversary Team, one of four Holy Cross Crusaders on the list. He recorded career totals of 1,464 points and 783 rebounds.

== Professional career ==
Following graduation, Szatko went undrafted in the 2003 NBA draft. He was drafted by the Gary Steelheads of the Continental Basketball Association, but never played for them. He was then tested but not signed by Polish team Stal Ostrów Wielkopolski. His only professional stint came during the 2004–05 season when he played in Portugal for Casino Figueira Ginasio, where he averaged 13.6 points, 6.3 rebounds and 1.6 assists in 26 games.
