= Mine Hill School District =

School district in Morris County, New Jersey, US

Address
- 42 Canfield Avenue Mine Hill Township, Morris County, New Jersey, 07803; United States
- Coordinates: 40.876302°N 74.603127°W

District information
- Grades: PreK-6
- Superintendent: Lee S. Nittel
- Business administrator: Carolina Rodriguez
- Schools: 1

Students and staff
- Enrollment: 371 (as of 2023–24)
- Faculty: 33.0 FTEs
- Student–teacher ratio: 11.2:1

Other information
- District Factor Group: FG
- Website: www.minehillcas.org
Ind.	Per pupil	District spending	Rank (*)	K-6 average	%± vs. average
1A	Total Spending	$15,600	11	$18,891	−17.4%
1	Budgetary Cost	12,469	11	13,649	−8.6%
2	Classroom Instruction	7,095	6	8,366	−15.2%
6	Support Services	2,111	27	2,161	−2.3%
8	Administrative Cost	1,662	33	1,467	13.3%
10	Operations & Maintenance	1,537	28	1,552	−1.0%
13	Extracurricular Activities	63	29	39	61.5%
16	Median Teacher Salary	59,353	34	57,437
Data from NJDoE 2014 Taxpayers' Guide to Education Spending. *Of K-6 districts with any number of students. Lowest spending=1; Highest=59

The Mine Hill School District is a community public school district that serves students in pre-kindergarten through sixth grade from Mine Hill Township, in Morris County, in the U.S. state of New Jersey.

As of the 2023–24 school year, the district, comprised of one school, had an enrollment of 371 students and 33.0 classroom teachers (on an FTE basis), for a student–teacher ratio of 11.2:1.

The district participates in the Interdistrict Public School Choice Program, which allows non-resident students to attend school in the district at no cost to their parents, with tuition covered by the resident district. Available slots are announced annually by grade.

The district had been classified by the New Jersey Department of Education as being in District Factor Group "FG", the fourth-highest of eight groupings. District Factor Groups organize districts statewide to allow comparison by common socioeconomic characteristics of the local districts. From lowest socioeconomic status to highest, the categories are A, B, CD, DE, FG, GH, I and J.

For seventh through twelfth grades, public school students attend the schools of the Dover School District in Dover as part of a sending/receiving relationship. The district also serves students from Victory Gardens, which has been fully consolidated into the Dover School District since 2010. The high school was recognized with the National Blue Ribbon School Award in 2013. Schools in the Dover School District attended by Mine Hill students (with 2023–24 enrollment from the National Center for Education Statistics) are Dover Middle School with 483 students in grade 7–8 and Dover High School with 1,176 students in grades 9–12.

== Awards and recognition ==
During the 1991–92 school year, Canfield Avenue School was recognized with the National Blue Ribbon Award from the United States Department of Education, the highest honor that an American school can achieve.

== School ==
Canfield Avenue School had an enrollment of 366 students during the 2023–24 school year.

- Adam Zygmunt, principal

== Administration ==
Core members of the district's administration are:

- Lee S. Nittel, superintendent
- Carolina Rodriguez, business administrator and board secretary

== Board of education ==
The district's board of education, comprised of seven members, sets policy and oversees the fiscal and educational operation of the district through its administration. As a Type II school district, the board's trustees are elected directly by voters to serve three-year terms of office on a staggered basis, with either two three seats up for election each year held (since 2012) as part of the November general election. The board appoints a superintendent to oversee the district's day-to-day operations and a business administrator to supervise the business functions of the district.
