= 2024–25 Atlantic 10 Conference men's basketball season =

- League: NCAA Division I
- Sport: Basketball
- Teams: 15

Regular season
- Regular Season Champions: George Mason & VCU
- Season MVP: Max Shulga, VCU

Atlantic 10 tournament

Seasons
- ← 2023–24 2025–26 →

2024–25 Atlantic 10 men's basketball standings
	Conf.				Overall
Team	W		L	PCT	W		L	PCT
VCU †	15	–	3	.833	28	–	7	.800
George Mason	15	–	3	.833	27	–	9	.750
Dayton	12	–	6	.667	23	–	11	.676
Loyola Chicago	12	–	6	.667	25	–	12	.676
Saint Louis	11	–	7	.611	19	–	15	.559
Saint Joseph's	11	–	7	.611	22	–	13	.629
George Washington	9	–	9	.500	21	–	13	.618
St. Bonaventure	9	–	9	.500	22	–	12	.647
Duquesne	8	–	10	.444	13	–	19	.406
Rhode Island	7	–	11	.389	18	–	13	.581
UMass	7	–	11	.389	12	–	20	.375
Davidson	6	–	12	.333	17	–	16	.515
Richmond	5	–	13	.278	10	–	22	.313
La Salle	5	–	13	.278	14	–	19	.424
Fordham	3	–	15	.167	12	–	21	.364
† 2025 A-10 tournament winner

The 2024–25 Atlantic 10 Conference men's basketball season started non-conference play on November 6, 2023, and began conference play on January 3, 2024. The regular season ended on March 8, 2024, followed by the 2024 Atlantic 10 men's basketball tournament from March 12 to March 17, 2024.

This was the final A-10 season for UMass, which joins the Mid-American Conference in July 2025.

== Previous season ==
The 2023–24 Atlantic 10 Conference men's basketball season began with non-conference play on November 6, 2023, and conference play on January 3, 2024. The regular season ended March 8, 2024, followed by the 2024 Atlantic 10 men's basketball tournament from March 12 to March 17, 2024. Richmond were the regular season champions, while Duquesne won the tournament. It was Richmond's first ever regular season title as members of the Atlantic 10 Conference, and their first overall regular season title since 2001. Duquesne won their second overall Atlantic 10 tournament, and it was their first since 1977.

Duquesne earned the conference's automatic bid into the 2024 NCAA Division I men's basketball tournament, while Dayton earned an at-large bid. Both teams reached the round of 32 before being eliminated. Richmond, Loyola Chicago, Saint Joseph's, and VCU earned at-large bids into the 2024 National Invitation Tournament. Richmond, Loyola Chicago, and Saint Joseph's were eliminated in the first round, while VCU reached the quarterfinals.

Dayton's DaRon Holmes II and Richmond's Jordan King were co-MVPs of the Atlantic 10 Conference.

== Head coaches ==
=== Coaching changes ===
Following the 2023–24 season, there were two coaching changes. Saint Louis head coach, Travis Ford was fired after eight seasons as head coach for the Billikens. Duquesne head coach, Keith Dambrot retired following the season. Saint Louis hired Indiana State head coach, Josh Schertz, to replace Ford. Duquesne promoted associated head coach, Dru Joyce III, to replace the retiring Dambrot.

=== Coaches ===
Team	Head coach	Previous job	Years at school	Overall record	A10 record	A10 titles	A10 tournament titles	NCAA Tournaments	NCAA Final Fours	NCAA Championships
Davidson	Matt McKillop	Davidson (Asst.)	3	31–33 (.484)	13–23 (.361)	0	0	0	0	0
Dayton	Anthony Grant	Oklahoma City Thunder (Asst.)	7	148–71 (.676)	88–36 (.710)	1	0	1	0	0
Duquesne	Dru Joyce III	Duquesne (Assoc.)	1	0–0 (–)	0–0 (–)	0	0	0	0	0
Fordham	Keith Urgo	Fordham (Assoc.)	3	38–28 (.576)	18–18 (.500)	0	0	0	0	0
George Mason	Tony Skinn	Maryland (Asst.)	2	20–12 (.625)	9–9 (.500)	0	0	0	0	0
George Washington	Chris Caputo	Miami (FL) (Assoc.)	3	31–33 (.484)	14–22 (.389)	0	0	0	0	0
La Salle	Fran Dunphy	Temple	3	31–36 (.463)	13–23 (.361)	0	0	0	0	0
Loyola Chicago	Drew Valentine	Loyola Chicago (Asst.)	4	33–30 (.524)	19–17 (.528)	1	0	0	0	0
Rhode Island	Archie Miller	Indiana	3	21–42 (.333)	11–25 (.306)	0	0	0	0	0
Richmond	Chris Mooney	Air Force	20	350–271 (.564)	176–141 (.555)	1	2	3	0	0
St. Bonaventure	Mark Schmidt	Robert Morris	17	302–226 (.572)	158–130 (.549)	2	2	3	0	0
Saint Joseph's	Billy Lange	Philadelphia 76ers (Asst.)	6	59–90 (.396)	27–57 (.321)	0	0	0	0	0
Saint Louis	Josh Schertz	Indiana State	1	0–0 (–)	0–0 (–)	0	0	0	0	0
UMass	Frank Martin	South Carolina	3	35–27 (.565)	17–19 (.472)	0	0	0	0	0
VCU	Ryan Odom	Utah State	2	22–13 (.629)	11–7 (.611)	0	0	0	0	0

Notes:

- All records, appearances, titles, etc. are from time with current school only.
- Year at school includes 2023–24 season.
- Overall and Atlantic 10 records are from time at current school only and are through the beginning of the season.

== Preseason ==
=== Preseason men's basketball poll ===
The preseason poll was released on October 6, 2024. VCU was voted as the favorite to win the Atlantic 10. Dayton, Saint Joseph's, Saint Louis, and Loyola Chicago all received first place votes.

First place votes in parentheses

Atlantic 10 Preseason Poll
Predicted finish	Team	Points
1	VCU	421 (14)
2	Dayton	394 (6)
3	Saint Joseph's	376 (5)
4	Saint Louis	371 (2)
5	Loyola Chicago	368 (2)
6	George Mason	262
7	Richmond	230
8	Duquesne	222 (1)
9	UMass	215
10	St. Bonaventure	210
11	Rhode Island	159
12	Davidson	118
13	George Washington	111
14	Fordham	80
15	La Salle	62

=== Preseason honors ===
The following players were named to the preseason All-Atlantic 10 teams.

Honor	Recipient	Postseason
Preseason All-Atlantic 10 First Team	Nate Santos, Dayton	
Preseason All-Atlantic 10 First Team	Des Watson, Loyola Chicago	
Preseason All-Atlantic 10 First Team	Erik Reynolds II, St. Joseph's	
Preseason All-Atlantic 10 First Team	Robbie Avila, Saint Louis	
Preseason All-Atlantic 10 First Team	Gibson Jimerson, Saint Louis	
Preseason All-Atlantic 10 First Team	Max Shulga, VCU	
Preseason All-Atlantic 10 Second Team	Posh Alexander, Dayton	
Preseason All-Atlantic 10 Second Team	Darius Maddox, George Mason	
Preseason All-Atlantic 10 Second Team	Darren Buchanan Jr., George Washington	
Preseason All-Atlantic 10 Second Team	Xzayvier Brown, St. Joseph's	
Preseason All-Atlantic 10 Second Team	Joe Bamisile, VCU	
Preseason All-Atlantic 10 Second Team	Zeb Jackson, VCU	
Preseason All-Atlantic 10 Third Team	Reed Bailey, Davidson	
Preseason All-Atlantic 10 Third Team	Rahsool Diggins, UMass	
Preseason All-Atlantic 10 Third Team	Miles Rubin, Loyola Chicago	
Preseason All-Atlantic 10 Third Team	Jaden House, Rhode Island	
Preseason All-Atlantic 10 Third Team	Rasheer Fleming, St. Joseph's	
Preseason All-Atlantic 10 Third Team	Isaiah Swope, Saint Louis	
Preseason All-Atlantic 10 Defensive Team	Posh Alexander, Dayton	
Preseason All-Atlantic 10 Defensive Team	Enoch Cheeks, Dayton	
Preseason All-Atlantic 10 Defensive Team	Abdou Tsimbila, Fordham	
Preseason All-Atlantic 10 Defensive Team	Miles Rubin, Loyola Chicago	
Preseason All-Atlantic 10 Defensive Team	Zeb Jackson, VCU	

== Regular season ==
=== Conference matrix ===
	Davidson	Dayton	Duquesne	Fordham	George Mason	George Washington	La Salle	Loyola Chicago	Rhode Island	Richmond	St. Bonaventure	Saint Joseph's	Saint Louis	UMass	VCU
vs. Davidson	—	0–0	0–0	0–0	0–0	0–0	0–0	0–0	0–0	0–0	0–0	0–0	0–0	0–0	0–0
vs. Dayton	0–0	—	0–0	0–0	0–0	0–0	0–0	0–0	0–0	0–0	0–0	0–0	0–0	0–0	0–0
vs. Duquesne	0–0	0–0	—	0–0	0–0	0–0	0–0	0–0	0–0	0–0	0–0	0–0	0–0	0–0	0–0
vs. Fordham	0–0	0–0	0–0	—	0–0	0–0	0–0	0–0	0–0	0–0	0–0	0–0	0–0	0–0	0–0
vs. George Mason	0–0	0–0	0–0	0–0	—	0–0	0–0	0–0	0–0	0–0	0–0	0–0	0–0	0–0	0–0
vs. George Washington	0–0	0–0	0–0	0–0	0–0	—	0–0	0–0	0–0	0–0	0–0	0–0	0–0	0–0	0–0
vs. La Salle	0–0	0–0	0–0	0–0	0–0	0–0	—	0–0	0–0	0–0	0–0	0–0	0–0	0–0	0–0
vs. Loyola Chicago	0–0	0–0	0–0	0–0	0–0	0–0	0–0	—	0–0	0–0	0–0	0–0	0–0	0–0	0–0
vs. Rhode Island	0–0	0–0	0–0	0–0	0–0	0–0	0–0	0–0	—	0–0	0–0	0–0	0–0	0–0	0–0
vs. Richmond	0–0	0–0	0–0	0–0	0–0	0–0	0–0	0–0	0–0	—	0–0	0–0	0–0	0–0	0–0
vs. St. Bonaventure	0–0	0–0	0–0	0–0	0–0	0–0	0–0	0–0	0–0	0–0	—	0–0	0–0	0–0	0–0
vs. Saint Joseph's	0–0	0–0	0–0	0–0	0–0	0–0	0–0	0–0	0–0	0–0	0–0	—	0–0	0–0	0–0
vs. Saint Louis	0–0	0–0	0–0	0–0	0–0	0–0	0–0	0–0	0–0	0–0	0–0	0–0	—	0–0	0–0
vs. UMass	0–0	0–0	0–0	0–0	0–0	0–0	0–0	0–0	0–0	0–0	0–0	0–0	0–0	—	0–0
vs. VCU	0–0	0–0	0–0	0–0	0–0	0–0	0–0	0–0	0–0	0–0	0–0	0–0	0–0	0–0	—
Total	0–0	0–0	0–0	0–0	0–0	0–0	0–0	0–0	0–0	0–0	0–0	0–0	0–0	0–0	0–0

=== Early season tournaments ===
	Tournament	Place/Finish
Davidson	Battle 4 Atlantis	6th
Dayton	Maui Invitational	7th
Duquesne	Cayman Islands Classic	7th
Fordham	Sunshine Slam	4th
George Mason	Marquette Classic	3rd
George Washington	Paradise Jam	4th
La Salle	Boardwalk Battle	7th
Loyola Chicago	Diamond Head Classic	8th
Rhode Island	Jacksonville Classic	1st
Richmond	Gulf Coast Showcase	2nd
St. Bonaventure	NIT Season Tip-Off	3rd
Saint Joseph's	Legends Classic	2nd
Saint Louis	Hall of Fame Classic	2nd
UMass	Hall of Fame Tip-Off	4th
VCU	Charleston Classic	7th

== Rankings ==
=== National polls ===
Legend
Increase in ranking
Decrease in ranking
Not ranked previous week

		Pre	Wk 1	Wk 2	Wk 3	Wk 4	Wk 5	Wk 6	Wk 7	Wk 8	Wk 9	Wk 10	Wk 11	Wk 12	Wk 13	Wk 14	Wk 15	Wk 16	Wk 17	Wk 18	Wk 19	Final
Davidson	AP	—	—	—	—	—	—	—	—	—	—	—	—	—	—	—	—	—	—			
Davidson	C	—	—	—	—	—	—	—	—	—	—	—	—	—	—	—	—	—	—			
Dayton	AP	—	RV	—	—	RV	RV	22	RV	RV	RV	—	—	—	—	—	—	—	—			
Dayton	C	RV	RV	RV	RV	RV	RV	24	RV	RV	—	—	—	—	—	—	—	—	—			
Duquesne	AP	—	—	—	—	—	—	—	—	—	—	—	—	—	—	—	—	—	—			
Duquesne	C	—	—	—	—	—	—	—	—	—	—	—	—	—	—	—	—	—	—			
Fordham	AP	—	—	—	—	—	—	—	—	—	—	—	—	—	—	—	—	—	—			
Fordham	C	—	—	—	—	—	—	—	—	—	—	—	—	—	—	—	—	—	—			
George Mason	AP	—	—	—	—	—	—	—	—	—	—	—	—	—	RV	RV	RV	—	—			
George Mason	C	—	—	—	—	—	—	—	—	—	—	—	—	—	—	—	RV	—	—			
George Washington	AP	—	—	—	—	—	—	—	—	—	—	—	—	—	—	—	—	—	—			
George Washington	C	—	—	—	—	—	—	—	—	—	—	—	—	—	—	—	—	—	—			
La Salle	AP	—	—	—	—	—	—	—	—	—	—	—	—	—	—	—	—	—	—			
La Salle	C	—	—	—	—	—	—	—	—	—	—	—	—	—	—	—	—	—	—			
Loyola Chicago	AP	—	—	—	—	—	RV	—	—	—	—	—	—	—	—	—	—	—	—			
Loyola Chicago	C	—	—	—	—	—	RV	—	—	—	—	—	—	—	—	—	—	—	—			
Rhode Island	AP	—	—	—	—	—	RV	—	—	—	—	—	—	—	—	—	—	—	—			
Rhode Island	C	—	—	—	—	—	—	—	—	—	—	—	—	—	—	—	—	—	—			
Richmond	AP	—	—	—	—	—	—	—	—	—	—	—	—	—	—	—	—	—	—			
Richmond	C	—	—	—	—	—	—	—	—	—	—	—	—	—	—	—	—	—	—			
St. Bonaventure	AP	—	—	—	—	—	—	RV	RV	RV	RV	—	—	—	—	—	—	—	—			
St. Bonaventure	C	—	—	—	—	—	—	—	—	—	—	—	—	—	—	—	—	—	—			
Saint Joseph's	AP	—	—	—	—	—	—	—	—	—	—	—	—	—	—	—	—	—	—			
Saint Joseph's	C	—	—	—	—	—	—	—	—	—	—	—	—	—	—	—	—	—	—			
Saint Louis	AP	RV	—	—	—	—	—	—	—	—	—	—	—	—	—	—	—	—	—			
Saint Louis	C	—	—	—	—	—	—	—	—	—	—	—	—	—	—	—	—	—	—			
UMass	AP	—	—	—	—	—	—	—	—	—	—	—	—	—	—	—	—	—	—			
UMass	C	—	—	—	—	—	—	—	—	—	—	—	—	—	—	—	—	—	—			
VCU	AP	RV	RV	RV	—	—	—	—	—	—	—	—	—	RV	—	—	—	RV	RV			
VCU	C	—	—	RV	—	—	—	—	—	—	—	—	—	—	—	RV	RV	RV	25			

=== Mid-major polls ===
Legend
Increase in ranking
Decrease in ranking
Not ranked previous week

SB Nation ranks teams that are not in the power conferences, CollegeInsider.com does not consider the Atlantic 10 to be a mid-major conference in their poll.

	Pre	Wk 1	Wk 2	Wk 3	Wk 4	Wk 5	Wk 6	Wk 7	Wk 8	Wk 9	Wk 10	Wk 11	Wk 12	Wk 13	Wk 14	Wk 15	Wk 16	Wk 17	Wk 18	Final
Davidson	—	—	—	—	RV	—	—	—	—	—	—	—	—	—	—	—	—	—		-
Dayton	4	5	5	4	4	2	2	4	1	6	10	11	11	14	13	13	19	13		-
Duquesne	—	—	—	—	—	—	—	—	—	—	—	—	—	—	—	—	—	—		-
Fordham	—	—	—	—	—	—	—	—	—	—	—	—	—	—	—	—	—	—		-
George Mason	RV	—	—	RV	RV	RV	RV	—	RV	—	RV	19	16	13	8	10	10	15		-
George Washington	—	—	—	—	—	—	—	—	—	24	18	—	—	—	—	—	—	—		-
La Salle	—	—	—	—	—	—	—	—	—	—	—	—	—	—	—	—	—	—		-
Loyola Chicago	18	14	13	11	12	9	12	22	—	—	—	—	—	—	—	—	—	—		-
Rhode Island	—	—	—	23	16	14	20	23	22	23	24	RV	—	—	—	—	—	—		-
Richmond	—	—	—	—	—	—	—	—	—	—	—	—	—	—	—	—	—	—		-
St. Bonaventure	—	—	—	—	RV	RV	17	15	12	6	12	18	—	24	—	—	—	—		-
Saint Joseph's	19	—	RV	RV	RV	RV	—	—	—	—	—	—	—	—	—	—	—	—		-
Saint Louis	13	16	24	RV	RV	—	—	—	—	RV	RV	RV	23	23	RV	—	—	—		-
UMass	—	—	—	—	—	—	—	—	—	—	—	—	—	—	—	—	—	—		-
VCU	3	2	2	10	14	10	8	8	8	9	7	5	5	6	6	5	4	3		-

== Record vs other conferences ==
The Atlantic 10 has a record of 146–74 in non-conference play. Updated March 18, 2024.

Power conferences
Conference	Record
ACC	2–2
Big East	4–4
Big Ten	1–1
Big 12	1–4
SEC	0–1
Combined	8–11

Non-power conferences
Conference	Record
America East	6–0
American	1–3
ASUN	3–1
Big Sky	1–0
Big South	0–0
Big West	1–1
CAA	5–3
Conference USA	1–2
Horizon	2–1
Independents/Non-Division I	11–0
Ivy	4–1
MAAC	4–2
MAC	3–1
MEAC	3–0
Missouri Valley	2–1
Mountain West	0–2
Northeast	4–1
OVC	0–0
Patriot	6–1
Southern	3–0
Southland	0–0
SWAC	0–0
Summit	0–1
Sun Belt	3–0
West Coast	1–3
WAC	1–0
Combined	65–25

== Postseason ==
=== Atlantic 10 tournament ===
The Atlantic 10 tournament was played at Capital One Arena in Washington, D.C. from March 12–16, 2025. Top-seeded VCU won their third Atlantic 10 tournament title, defeating second-seed, George Mason, 68–63, in the Championship game.

First round Wednesday, March 12; USA Network
12	Davidson	69
13	Richmond	65
10	Rhode Island	71
15	Fordham	88
11	UMass	71
14	La Salle	78

Second round Thursday, March 13; USA Network
8	St. Bonaventure	64
9	Duquesne	59
5	Saint Louis	83
12	Davidson	75
7	George Washington	88
15	Fordham	81
6	Saint Joseph's	75
14	La Salle	70

Quarterfinals; Friday, March 14; USA Network/Peacock
1	VCU	76
8	St. Bonaventure	59
4	Loyola Chicago	72
5	Saint Louis	64
2	George Mason	80
7	George Washington	65
3	Dayton	68
6	Saint Joseph's	73^{OT}

Semifinals; Saturday, March 15; CBSSN
1	VCU	62
4	Loyola Chicago	55
2	George Mason	74
6	Saint Joseph's	64

Championship; Sunday, March 16; CBS
1	VCU	68
2	George Mason	63

=== NCAA tournament ===
The NCAA tournament will be played from March 18–April 7, 2025. VCU was the only bid from the Atlantic 10 to qualify making it the second time in the last three seasons the Atlantic 10 only received one bid to the tournament.

Seed	Region	School	First Four	First round	Second round	Sweet 16	Elite Eight	Final Four	Championship
11	East	VCU	—N/a	L 71–80 vs. (6) BYU – (Denver)	DNP				

=== NIT ===
The NIT will be played from March 22–April 3, 2025. A record six Atlantic 10 teams received bids to the NIT. One was an automatic bid and five were at-large bids.

Seed	Region	School	First round	Second round	Quarterfinals	Semifinals	Championship
1	Dayton	Dayton	W 86–79 at Florida Atlantic – (Boca Raton)	L 72–87 at Chattanooga – (Chattanooga)	DNP		
2	Dayton	George Mason	W 86–69 vs. Samford – (Fairfax)	L 67–75 vs. (3) Bradley – (Fairfax)	DNP		
3	San Francisco	St. Bonaventure	L 56–75 vs. Kent State – (Olean)	DNP			
3	Irvine	Saint Joseph's	L 65–69 vs. UAB – (Philadelphia)	DNP			
	San Francisco	Loyola Chicago	W 73–70 at (4) San Jose State – (San Jose)	W 77–76 at (1) San Francisco – (San Francisco)	W 72–62 vs. Kent State – (Chicago)	vs. Chattanooga – (Indianapolis)	
	Dallas	Saint Louis	L 78–103 at (3) Arkansas State – (Jonesboro)	DNP			

=== College Basketball Crown ===
The College Basketball Crown will be played from March 31 to April 6, 2025. George Washington accepted an invite to the CBC.

Seed	School	First round	Quarterfinals	Semifinals	Championship
16	George Washington	vs. (1) Boise State – (Las Vegas)			

=== CBI ===
The CBI will be played from March 22–26, 2025. No Atlantic 10 teams participated in the CBI.

== Honors and awards ==
=== All-A10 awards and teams ===
==== A-10 season awards ====
Award	Recipient
Player of the Year	Max Shulga, VCU
Coach of the Year	Tony Skinn, George Mason
Defensive Player of the Year	Jared Billups, George Mason
Rookie of the Year	Deuce Jones, La Salle
Sixth Man of the Year	Zeb Jackson, VCU
Most Improved Player	Reed Bailey, Davidson

2024-25 Atlantic 10 Men's Basketball All-Conference Teams
First Team	Second Team	Third Team	Defensive Team	Rookie Team	Academic Team
Reed Bailey, Davidson; Jalen Haynes, George Mason; Xzayvier Brown, Saint Joseph's; Rasheer Fleming, Saint Joseph's; Gibson Jimerson, Saint Louis; Max Shulga, VCU	Nate Santos, Dayton; Rafael Castro, George Washington; Jayden Dawson, Loyola Chicago; Erik Reynolds II, Saint Joseph's; Robbie Avila, Saint Louis; Joe Bamisile, VCU	Enoch Cheeks, Dayton; Darius Maddox, George Mason; Rahsool Diggins, Massachusetts; Sebastian Thomas, Rhode Island; Melvin Council Jr, Saint Bonaventure; Isaiah Swope, Saint Louis	Enoch Cheeks, Dayton; Jared Billups, George Mason; Rafael Castro, George Washington; Miles Rubin, Loyola Chicago; Justice Ajogbor, Saint Joseph's; Luke Bamgboye, VCU	Amaël L’Etang, Dayton; Christian Jones, George Washington; Deuce Jones, La Salle; Dasear Haskins, SJU; Luke Bamgboye, VCU	Nate Santos, Dayton; Dusan Neskovic, Richmond; Chance Moore, St. Bonaventure; Gibson Jimerson, Saint Louis; Joe Bamisile, VCU
