= Ben Loory =

American short fiction writer (born 1971)

- Born: July 11, 1971 (age 55); Dover, New Jersey, U.S.
- Education: Dover High School; Harvard University (BA); American Film Institute (MFA)
- Occupation: Writer
- Writing career
- Genres: Literary fiction, fantasy, horror
- Website: benloory.com

Ben Loory (born July 11, 1971) is an American short fiction writer. He is the author of the collections Stories for Nighttime and Some for the Day (Penguin, 2011) and Tales of Falling and Flying (Penguin, 2017), as well as a picture book for children, The Baseball Player and the Walrus (Dial Books for Young Readers, 2015). Loory's stories have appeared in more than one hundred journals and magazines including The New Yorker, BOMB Magazine, Fairy Tale Review, and TriQuarterly, and been heard on This American Life and Selected Shorts. He lives and teaches short story writing in Los Angeles.

== Education ==
Raised in Dover, New Jersey, Loory attended Dover High School.

Loory graduated from Harvard University magna cum laude in 1993 with a BA in Visual & Environmental Studies, and earned an MFA in Screenwriting from the American Film Institute in 1996.

== Short fiction and other writing ==
Loory's first collection, Stories for Nighttime and Some for the Day, was published by Penguin in 2011. It was a Fall Selection of the Barnes & Noble Discover Great New Writers Program and an August Selection of the Starbucks Coffee Bookish Reading Club. Loory's second collection, Tales of Falling and Flying, was published by Penguin in 2017. It earned a starred review from Kirkus, was called "mesmerizing and magical" by NPR, and was named a Favorite Book of the Year by the staff of the Paris Review. It has since been called one of the "50 Best Fantasy Books of All Time" by Esquire Magazine, and one of the "25 Best Fantasy Books of All Time" by Good Housekeeping.

Loory has published more than one hundred short stories in magazines and journals including The New Yorker, Electric Literature, Uncharted Magazine, The Kenyon Review, Tin House, Sewanee Review, The Adroit Journal, A Public Space, Fairy Tale Review, Wigleaf, Craft Literary, BOMB Magazine, and TriQuarterly. His story "The TV" was named a Distinguished Story of the Year in The 2011 Best American Short Stories anthology, and his story "The Book" was one of 100 very short stories included in Library of America's genre-defining 2026 volume American Flash Fiction.

Three of Loory's stories ("The Duck," "The Man and the Moose," and "Death and the Fruits of the Tree") have been heard on This American Life, and many more have been performed at Selected Shorts events and heard on their podcast, including "The Book," "The Duck," "The TV," and "The Man and the Moose" from Stories for Nighttime and Some for the Day, "The Dodo," "The Cape," "The Frog and the Bird," "The Monster," "Death and the Lady," and "The Man, the Restaurant, and the Eiffel Tower" from Tales of Falling and Flying., and "The Magic Mountain," "The Vatican," and "Dandelions," which are as yet uncollected. On December 12, 2018, a dance adaptation of Loory's story "The Cape," choreographed by Gabrielle Lamb of Pigeonwing Dance, was performed at Symphony Space in New York as part of the Selected Shorts "Dance in America" event, and on March 26, 2022, a short film by animator Michael Arthur inspired by Loory's story "Dandelions" was shown as part of the "Wall to Wall Selected Shorts" event.

As a screenwriter, Loory has worked for Jodie Foster, Alex Proyas, Mark Johnson, and others. He has also contributed creative non-fiction to the online arts and culture magazine The Nervous Breakdown.

== Music ==
Loory is also a musician. He was a member of Soda & his Million Piece Band, in which he played mandolin and baritone saxophone. Their music was featured in the soundtrack for the film Waitress (2007), directed by Adrienne Shelly.

== Works ==
- Stories for Nighttime and Some for the Day (2011)
- The Baseball Player and the Walrus (2015)
- Tales of Falling and Flying (2017)
