= Victory Gardens, New Jersey =

Borough in Morris County, New Jersey, US

- Borough
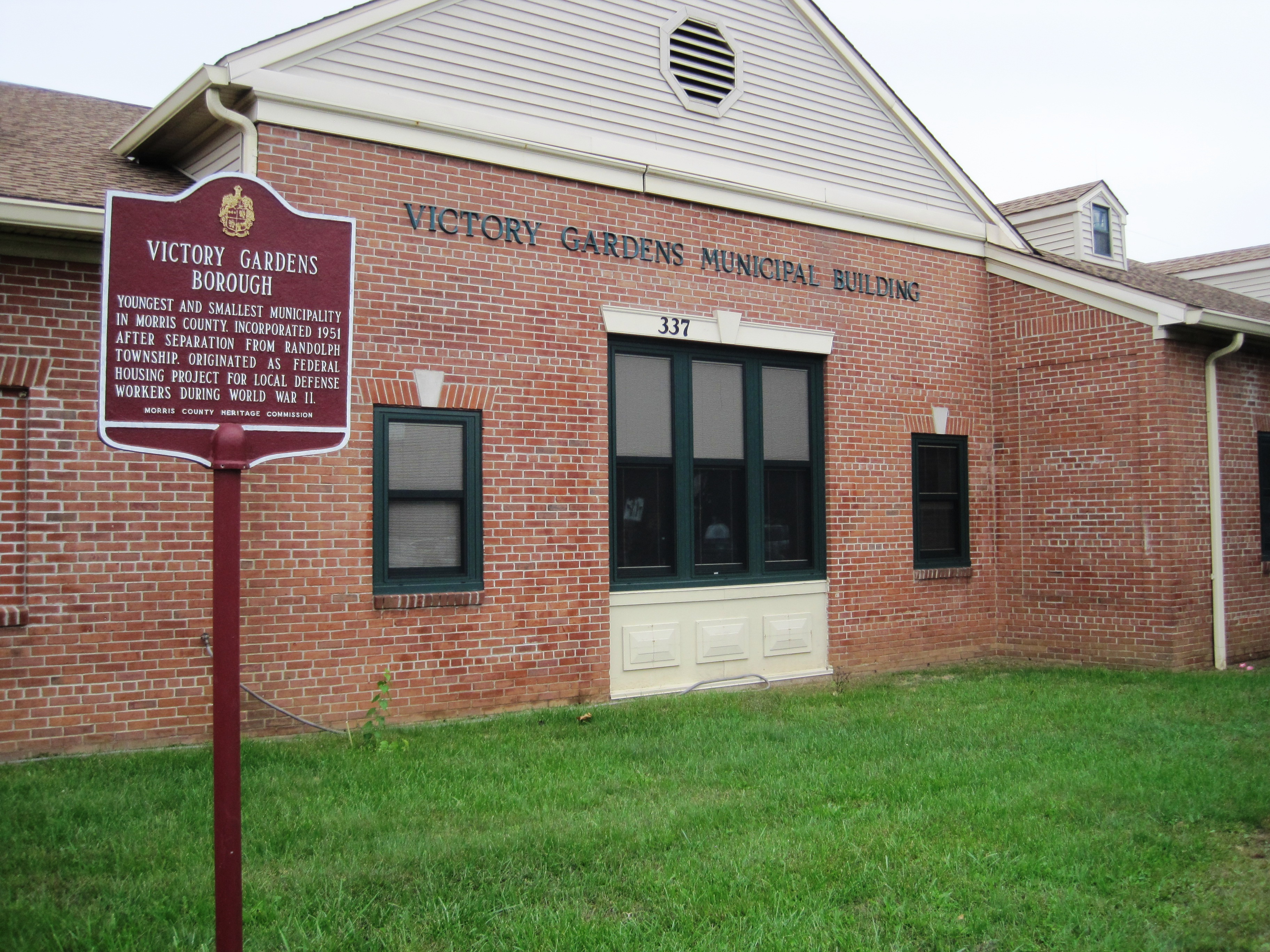
- Victory Gardens Municipal Building

- Seal

- Location in Morris County and the state of New Jersey.

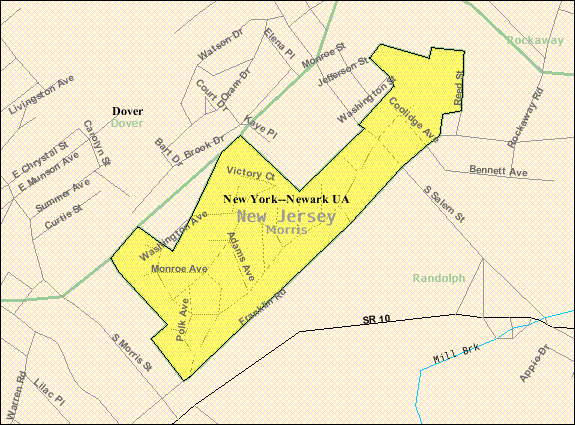
- Census Bureau map of Victory Gardens, New Jersey

- Location in Morris County Location in New Jersey Location in the United States
- Coordinates: 40.87613°N 74.54353°W
- Country: United States
- State: New Jersey
- County: Morris
- Incorporated: September 18, 1951

Government
  - Type: Borough
  - Body: Borough Council
  - Mayor: David Holeman Jr. (D, term ends December 31, 2024)
  - Administrator / Municipal clerk: Deborah Evans

Area
  - Total: 0.15 sq mi (0.38 km^{2})
  - Land: 0.15 sq mi (0.38 km^{2})
  - Water: 0 sq mi (0.00 km^{2}) 0.00%
  - Rank: 562nd of 565 in state 39th of 39 in county
- Elevation: 646 ft (197 m)

Population (2020)
  - Total: 1,582
  - Estimate (2023): 1,583
  - Rank: 508th of 565 in state 39th of 39 in county
  - Density: 10,901.3/sq mi (4,209.0/km^{2})
  - Rank: 34th of 565 in state 1st of 39 in county
- Time zone: UTC−05:00 (Eastern (EST))
  - Summer (DST): UTC−04:00 (Eastern (EDT))
- ZIP Code: 07801 – Dover
- Area codes: 862/973 and 908
- FIPS code: 3402775890
- GNIS feature ID: 0885427
- Website: www.victorygardensnj.gov

Victory Gardens is a borough in Morris County, in the U.S. state of New Jersey. As of the 2020 United States census, the borough's population was 1,582, an increase of 62 (+4.1%) from the 2010 census count of 1,520, which in turn reflected a decline of 26 (−1.7%) from the 1,546 counted in the 2000 census.

Victory Gardens is Morris County's smallest municipality, measured both by size and population, and its most densely populated. Additionally, the borough is the state's fourth-smallest municipality by area.

== History ==
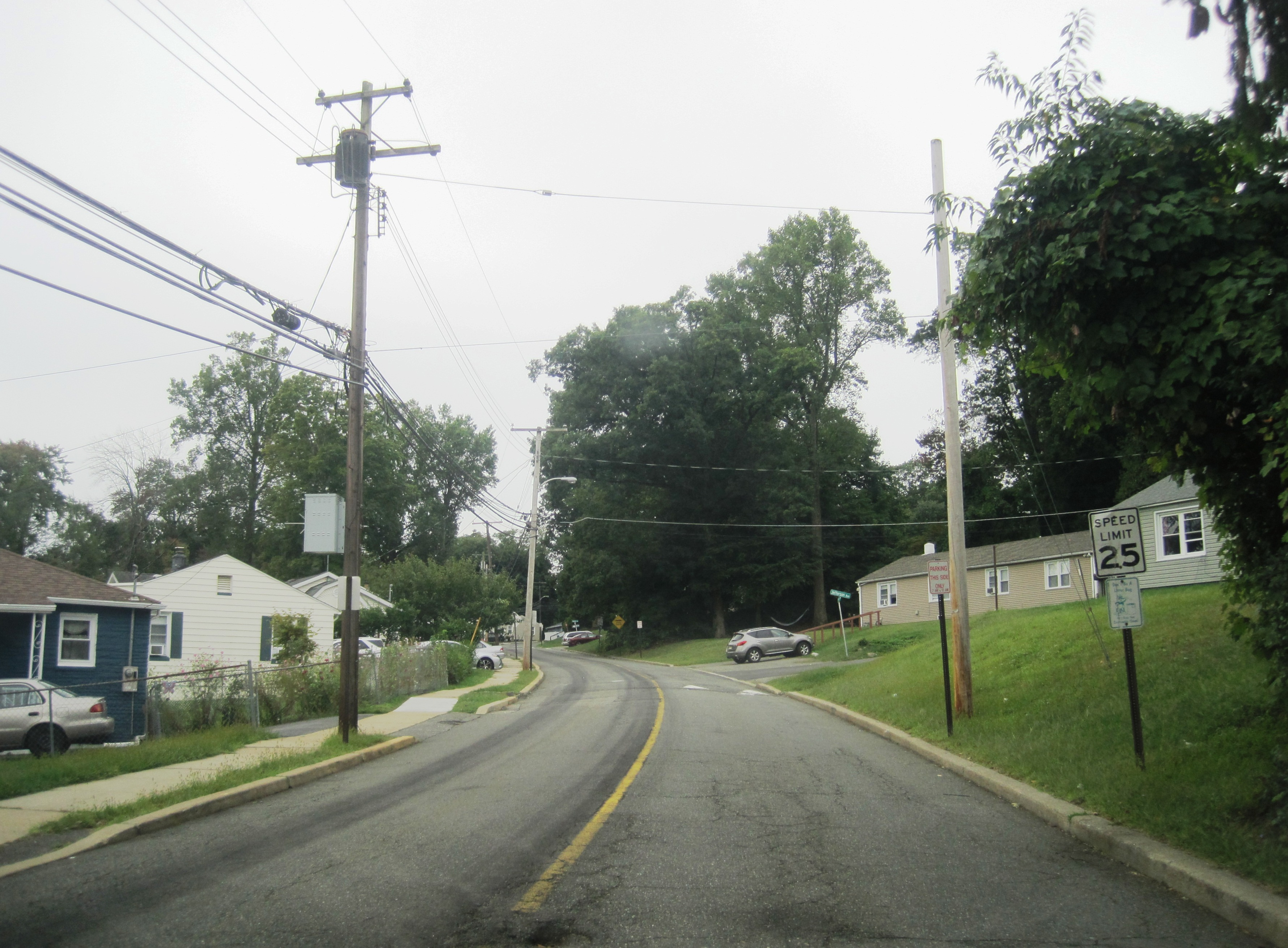
Along Washington Avenue

The origins of the borough began in 1941, when the federal government acquired 91 acres (370,000 m^{2}) in Randolph Township as the site of a 300-unit housing project for war industry employees. The borough's name is derived from the victory gardens planted at homes and parks during World War II to provide additional supplies of fruits and vegetables. Streets are named for U.S. Presidents.

Randolph Township residents approved a referendum as part of a September 1951 special election in which voters were asked if the township's Victory Gardens neighborhood should be removed from the township and created as an independent municipality for its 1,300 residents covering 92 acres (37 ha). Residents of other areas of Randolph Township argued that the compensation paid by the federal government for the more than 250 students attending the Randolph Township Schools did not adequately cover the cost of their public education, that the housing and other structures in Victory Gardens was out of compliance with the township's building and zoning ordinances and that the overwhelming Democratic Party political leanings of residents of Victory Gardens were out of sync with the largely Republican Party township.

Victory Gardens was incorporated as a borough by an act of the New Jersey Legislature on June 20, 1951, from portions of Randolph Township, based on the results of the referendum passed on September 18, 1951.

The small town made news on November 16, 1958, when 262 members of its 297 families participated voluntarily as "refugees" in a civil defense exercise, while other residents of the town — "school boys with Geiger counters, staff men with fancy helmets, girls with typewriters, Explorer Scouts, police and fire crews, medical teams and the dozens who just washed pots and pans and ladled stew" — volunteered to assist. "Those who remained home," The New York Times wrote, "were restricted in their movements by guards who patrolled the town."

A project approved in 1973 brought the construction of 184 units of garden apartments on a site covering 12.4 acres (5.0 ha), providing additional rateables and offering permanent housing for an estimated 400 people, that would contrast with the temporary original structures built in the 1940s that had long passed their expected lifespan.

== Geography ==
According to the United States Census Bureau, the borough had a total area of 0.15 square miles (0.38 km^{2}), all of which was land.

The borough borders the Morris County municipalities of Dover and Randolph.

== Demographics ==
Historical population
| Census | Pop. | Note | %± |
|---|---|---|---|
| 1960 | 1,085 | | — |
| 1970 | 1,027 | | −5.3% |
| 1980 | 1,043 | | 1.6% |
| 1990 | 1,314 | | 26.0% |
| 2000 | 1,546 | | 17.7% |
| 2010 | 1,649 | | 6.7% |
| 2020 | 1,582 | | −4.1% |
| 2023 (est.) | 1,583 | ▲ | 0.1% |
Population sources:1960–1990 2000 2010 2020

=== 2010 census ===
The 2010 United States census counted 1,520 people, 533 households, and 398 families in the borough. The population density was 10,419.2 per square mile (4,022.9/km^{2}). There were 566 housing units at an average density of 3,879.8 per square mile (1,498.0/km^{2}). The racial makeup was 58.49% (889) White, 16.25% (247) Black or African American, 0.66% (10) Native American, 2.43% (37) Asian, 0.00% (0) Pacific Islander, 17.43% (265) from other races, and 4.74% (72) from two or more races. Hispanic or Latino of any race were 62.96% (957) of the population.

Of the 533 households, 41.7% had children under the age of 18; 43.0% were married couples living together; 21.8% had a female householder with no husband present and 25.3% were non-families. Of all households, 20.3% were made up of individuals and 3.2% had someone living alone who was 65 years of age or older. The average household size was 2.85 and the average family size was 3.16.

26.4% of the population were under the age of 18, 9.1% from 18 to 24, 34.2% from 25 to 44, 24.0% from 45 to 64, and 6.3% who were 65 years of age or older. The median age was 33.3 years. For every 100 females, the population had 92.4 males. For every 100 females ages 18 and older there were 90.8 males.

The Census Bureau's 2006–2010 American Community Survey showed that (in 2010 inflation-adjusted dollars) median household income was $53,269 (with a margin of error of +/− $3,599) and the median family income was $52,500 (+/− $6,885). Males had a median income of $34,063 (+/− $5,135) versus $33,750 (+/− $9,755) for females. The per capita income for the borough was $18,340 (+/− $1,640). About 11.9% of families and 16.3% of the population were below the poverty line, including 26.6% of those under age 18 and none of those age 65 or over.

=== 2000 census ===
As of the 2000 United States census there were 1,546 people, 564 households, and 381 families residing in the borough. The population density was 10,582.6 inhabitants per square mile (4,086.0/km^{2}). There were 588 housing units at an average density of 4,025.0 per square mile (1,554.1/km^{2}). The racial makeup of the borough was 51.36% White, 21.41% African American, 0.06% Native American, 5.43% Asian, 15.27% from other races, and 6.47% from two or more races. Hispanic or Latino of any race were 50.65% of the population.

15.27% of Victory Gardens residents identified themselves as being of Colombian ancestry in the 2000 Census, the highest percentage of the population of any municipality in the United States.

There were 564 households, out of which 39.7% had children under the age of 18 living with them, 43.3% were married couples living together, 17.9% had a female householder with no husband present, and 32.3% were non-families. 25.2% of all households were made up of individuals, and 2.7% had someone living alone who was 65 years of age or older. The average household size was 2.74 and the average family size was 3.21.

In the borough the population was spread out, with 26.5% under the age of 18, 9.6% from 18 to 24, 39.3% from 25 to 44, 19.2% from 45 to 64, and 5.4% who were 65 years of age or older. The median age was 32 years. For every 100 females, there were 92.5 males. For every 100 females age 18 and over, there were 87.3 males.

The median income for a household in the borough was $44,375, and the median income for a family was $43,594. Males had a median income of $32,841 versus $24,875 for females. The per capita income for the borough was $20,616. About 8.9% of families and 8.4% of the population were below the poverty line, including 10.4% of those under age 18 and 10.5% of those age 65 or over.

== Government ==
=== Local government ===
Victory Gardens is governed under the borough form of New Jersey municipal government, which is used in 218 municipalities (of the 564) statewide, making it the most common form of government in New Jersey. The governing body is comprised of the mayor and the borough council, with all positions elected at-large on a partisan basis as part of the November general election. The mayor is elected directly by the voters to a four-year term of office. The borough council includes six members elected to serve three-year terms on a staggered basis, with two seats coming up for election each year in a three-year cycle. The borough form of government used by Victory Gardens is a "weak mayor / strong council" government in which council members act as the legislative body with the mayor presiding at meetings and voting only in the event of a tie. The mayor can veto ordinances subject to an override by a two-thirds majority vote of the council. The mayor makes committee and liaison assignments for council members, and most appointments are made by the mayor with the advice and consent of the council.

As of 2026, the mayor of Victory Gardens is Democrat David L. Holeman Jr., whose term of office ends December 31, 2028. Members of the Borough Council are Ondria Garcia-Montes (D, 2027), James R. Glass (D, 2028), Stuart Hale (D, 2026), Kendyll Hedgepath (D, 2027), Ismael Lorenzo Sr. (D, 2026), and Norberto Suarez (D, 2028).

Joan Cegelka won election in November 2013 to serve the balance of the term expiring in 2014 that had been held by David Holeman before he took office as mayor, with Vera Cheatham winning re-election to a full three-year term and Independent Hector Lorenzo Jr. knocking off incumbent Sonia Hall for terms starting January 1, 2014.

In December 2010, Councilmember Ondria Garcia-Montes was placed on probation for 12 months after an incident in which she falsely told police that a criminal suspect who was the subject of a search warrant was not in her apartment.

Dover serves as the lead agency operating a joint municipal court that include Victory Gardens and the neighboring municipalities of Mine Hill Township, Mount Arlington and Wharton. Established in 2009, the joint municipal court was forecast to offer annual savings in excess of $250,000 over the 10-year life of the agreement.

In 2018, the borough had an average property tax bill of $4,417, the lowest in the county, compared to an average bill of $10,480 in Morris County and $8,767 statewide.

=== Federal, state and county representation ===
Victory Gardens is located in the 11th Congressional District and is part of New Jersey's 25th state legislative district.

For the 119th United States Congress, New Jersey's 11th congressional district is represented by Analilia Mejia (D, Glen Ridge) who was elected in a 2026 special election to serve for the remainder of the Congress following the resignation Mikie Sherrill (D, Montclair), who was elected Governor of New Jersey in 2025. New Jersey is represented in the United States Senate by Democrats Cory Booker (Newark, term ends 2027) and Andy Kim (Moorestown, term ends 2031).

For the 2026–2027 session, the 25th legislative district of the New Jersey Legislature is represented in the State Senate by Anthony M. Bucco (R, Boonton Township) and in the General Assembly by Aura K. Dunn (R, Mendham Borough) and Marisa Sweeney (D, Morristown).

Morris County is governed by a Board of County Commissioners comprised of seven members who are elected at-large in partisan elections to three-year terms on a staggered basis, with either one or three seats up for election each year as part of the November general election. Actual day-to-day operation of departments is supervised by County Administrator Deena Leary.

As of 2026, Morris County's Commissioners (with all terms ending December 31) are Director Stephen H. Shaw (R, Mountain Lakes, 2027), Deputy Director John Krickus (R, Washington Township, 2027), Douglas Cabana (R, Boonton Township, 2028), Thomas J. Mastrangelo (R, Montville, 2028), Christine Myers (R, Harding Township, 2028), Tayfun Selen (R, Chatham Township, 2026), and Deborah Smith (R, Denville Township, 2027).

The county's constitutional officers are County Clerk Ann F. Grossi (R, Parsippany–Troy Hills, 2028), Sheriff James M. Gannon (R, Boonton Township, 2025) and Surrogate Heather Darling (R, Roxbury, 2029).

=== Politics ===
United States presidential election results for Victory Gardens 2024 2020 2016 2012 2008 2004
| Year | Republican | | Democratic | | Third party(ies) | |
| Year | No. | % | No. | % | No. | % |
|---|---|---|---|---|---|---|
| 2024 | 155 | 38.85% | 240 | 60.15% | 4 | 1.00% |
| 2020 | 101 | 24.11% | 315 | 75.18% | 3 | 0.72% |
| 2016 | 71 | 18.78% | 298 | 78.84% | 9 | 2.38% |
| 2012 | 65 | 17.66% | 301 | 81.79% | 2 | 0.54% |
| 2008 | 82 | 21.24% | 302 | 78.24% | 2 | 0.52% |
| 2004 | 108 | 33.86% | 209 | 65.52% | 2 | 0.63% |

As of March 23, 2011, there were a total of 523 registered voters in Victory Gardens, of which 234 (44.7%) were registered as Democrats, 58 (11.1%) were registered as Republicans and 231 (44.2%) were registered as Unaffiliated. There were no voters registered to other parties.

Every Democratic Party nominee for president since at least Jimmy Carter has carried Victory Gardens. 1984, 1988, 2004, and 2024 were the only presidential elections where the Republican candidate got over 30.0% of the votes cast. Democrat Kamala Harris won with 60.15% of votes cast in the 2024 United States presidential election, the lowest any Democratic candidate had gotten since at least Bill Clinton with 56.45% in 1992.

Gubernatorial election results for Victory Gardens
| Year | Republican | | Democratic | | Third party(ies) | |
| Year | No. | % | No. | % | No. | % |
|---|---|---|---|---|---|---|
| 2025 | 63 | 21.36% | 226 | 76.61% | 6 | 2.03% |
| 2021 | 58 | 29.59% | 136 | 69.39% | 2 | 1.02% |
| 2017 | 42 | 22.95% | 136 | 74.32% | 5 | 2.73% |
| 2013 | 90 | 48.39% | 90 | 48.39% | 6 | 3.23% |
| 2009 | 55 | 28.80% | 118 | 61.78% | 18 | 9.42% |
| 2005 | 54 | 26.60% | 145 | 71.43% | 4 | 1.97% |

In the 2013 gubernatorial election, Republican Chris Christie and Democrat Barbara Buono each received 48.4% of the vote (90 cast), ahead of other candidates with 3.2% (6 votes), among the 224 ballots cast by the borough's 556 registered voters (38 ballots were spoiled), for a turnout of 40.3%. In the 2009 gubernatorial election, Democrat Jon Corzine received 58.4% of the vote (118 ballots cast), ahead of Republican Chris Christie with 27.2% (55 votes), Independent Chris Daggett with 8.4% (17 votes) and other candidates with 0.5% (1 votes), among the 202 ballots cast by the borough's 544 registered voters, yielding a 37.1% turnout.

United States Senate election results for Victory Gardens1
| Year | Republican | | Democratic | | Third party(ies) | |
| Year | No. | % | No. | % | No. | % |
|---|---|---|---|---|---|---|
| 2024 | 97 | 30.41% | 207 | 64.89% | 15 | 4.70% |
| 2018 | 54 | 17.88% | 230 | 76.16% | 18 | 5.96% |
| 2012 | 54 | 16.56% | 267 | 81.90% | 5 | 1.53% |
| 2006 | 54 | 26.60% | 141 | 69.46% | 8 | 3.94% |

United States Senate election results for Victory Gardens2
| Year | Republican | | Democratic | | Third party(ies) | |
| Year | No. | % | No. | % | No. | % |
|---|---|---|---|---|---|---|
| 2020 | 81 | 20.00% | 316 | 78.02% | 8 | 1.98% |
| 2014 | 34 | 19.54% | 138 | 79.31% | 2 | 1.15% |
| 2013 | 29 | 26.13% | 81 | 72.97% | 1 | 0.90% |
| 2008 | 81 | 25.23% | 227 | 70.72% | 13 | 4.05% |

== Education ==
Victory Gardens is a non-operating school district, with all public school students in kindergarten through twelfth grade in Victory Gardens attending the schools of the Dover School District in Dover, which has been consolidated between the two municipalities since 2010. As of the 2021–22 school year, the district, comprised of five schools, had an enrollment of 3,448 students and 244.6 classroom teachers (on an FTE basis), for a student–teacher ratio of 14.1:1. Schools in the district (with 2021–22 enrollment from the National Center for Education Statistics) are Academy Street Elementary School with 470 students in grades K-6, East Dover Elementary School with 389 students in grades K-6, North Dover Elementary School with 658 students in grades PreK-6, Dover Middle School with 524 students in grades 7-8 and Dover High School with 1,094 students in grades 9-12. Public school students in grades 7–12 from Mine Hill Township attend Dover Middle School and Dover High School as part of a sending/receiving relationship with the Mine Hill School District. The high school was recognized with the National Blue Ribbon School Award in 2013.

== Transportation ==
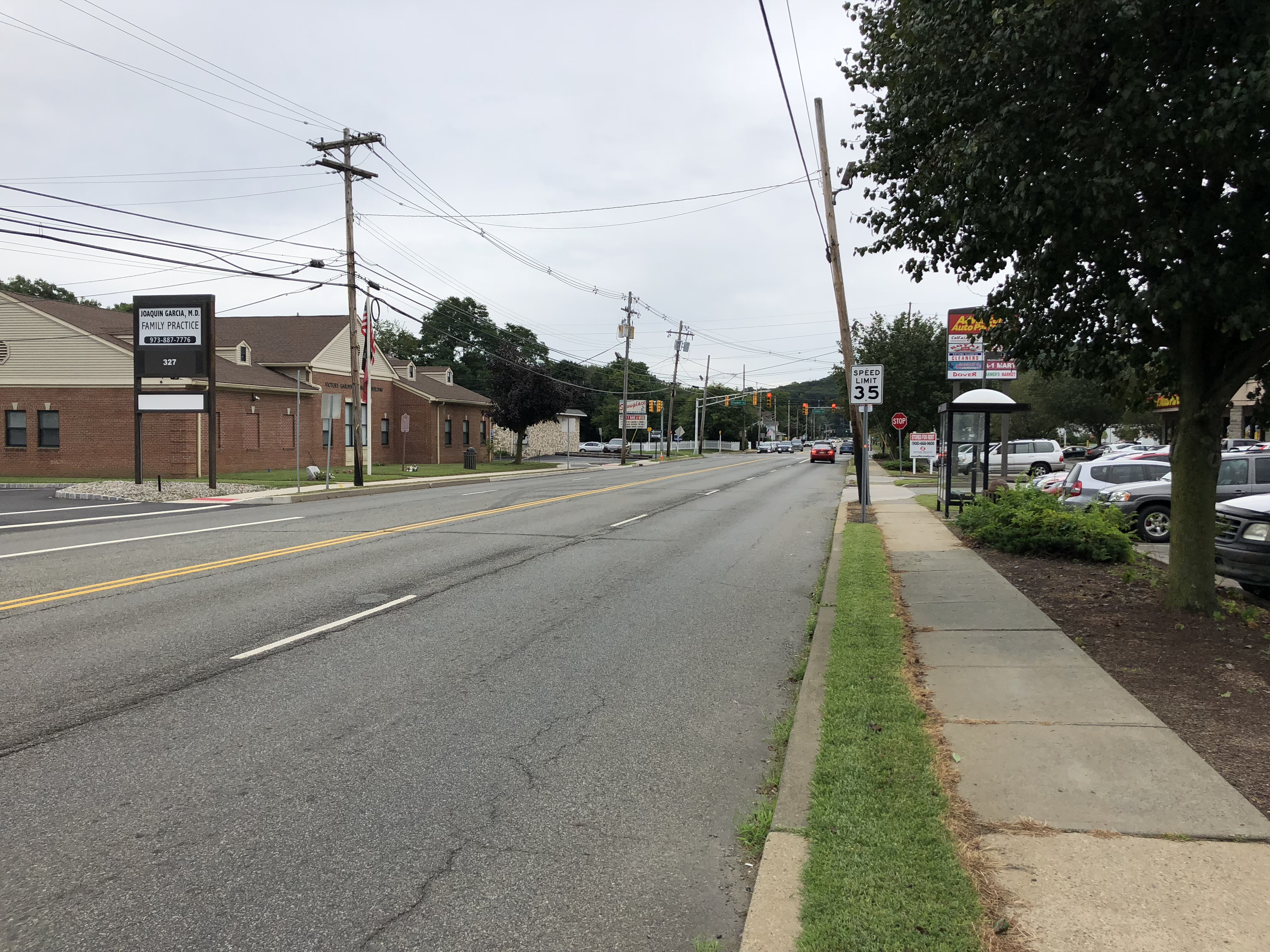
County Route 665 in Victory Gardens

=== Roads and highways ===
As of May 2010, the borough had a total of 2.89 miles (4.65 km) of roadways, of which 2.78 miles (4.47 km) were maintained by the municipality and 0.11 miles (0.18 km) by Morris County.

County Route 665 (South Salem Street) runs through the northwest corner of the borough, connecting Randolph on both sides.

=== Public transportation ===
NJ Transit offers local bus service on the 875 route. NJ Transit had previously offered service in the borough on the MCM2 and MCM7 routes.
