= Mine Hill Township, New Jersey =

Township in Morris County, New Jersey, US

- Township
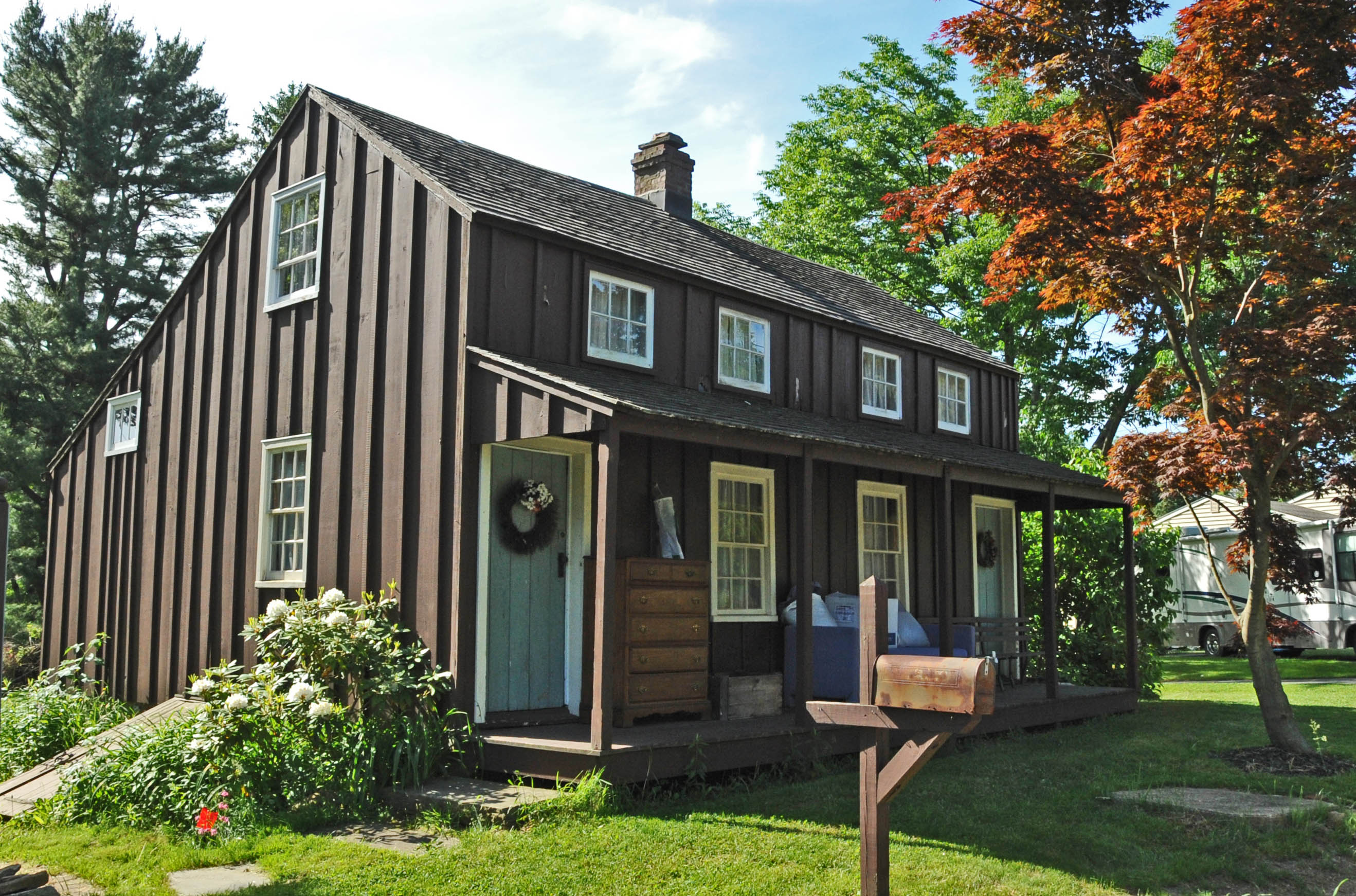
- Bridget Smith House

- Seal

- Location of Mine Hill Township in Morris County highlighted and circled in red (right). Inset map: Location of Morris County in New Jersey highlighted in orange (left).

- Location in Morris County Location in New Jersey Location in the United States
- Coordinates: 40.878088°N 74.601176°W
- Country: United States
- State: New Jersey
- County: Morris
- Incorporated: May 8, 1923

Government
  - Type: Faulkner Act (mayor–council)
  - Body: Township Council
  - Mayor: Sam Morris (R, term ends December 31, 2023)
  - Municipal clerk: Marcie Istvan

Area
  - Total: 3.00 sq mi (7.76 km^{2})
  - Land: 2.94 sq mi (7.61 km^{2})
  - Water: 0.058 sq mi (0.15 km^{2}) 1.93%
  - Rank: 335th of 565 in state 26th of 39 in county
- Elevation: 866 ft (264 m)

Population (2020)
  - Total: 4,015
  - Estimate (2023): 4,006
  - Rank: 412th of 565 in state 35th of 39 in county
  - Density: 1,366.2/sq mi (527.5/km^{2})
  - Rank: 349th of 565 in state 23rd of 39 in county
- Time zone: UTC−05:00 (Eastern (EST))
  - Summer (DST): UTC−04:00 (Eastern (EDT))
- ZIP Code: 07803
- Area code: 973
- FIPS code: 3402746860
- GNIS feature ID: 0882202
- Website: www.minehill.com

Mine Hill Township is a township in Morris County, in the U.S. state of New Jersey. It is a residential community located just west of the center of Morris County, and northwest of the county seat Morristown.

Mine Hill was incorporated as a township by an act of the New Jersey Legislature on March 2, 1923, from portions of Randolph, based on the results of a referendum held on May 8, 1923.

The township's name comes from the history of mines in the area. Mining in Mine Hill dates back to the early 18th century and the township had some of the richest sources of iron ore in the country. The family of Mahlon Dickerson, who was New Jersey's 7th Governor, owned the Dickerson Mine, which was the largest ore mine in the area, supplying much of the iron ore used during the American Revolutionary War. The last mine in the township closed in the late 1960s.

As of the 2020 United States census, the township's population was 4,015, an increase of 364 (+10.0%) from the 2010 census count of 3,651, which in turn reflected a decline of 28 (−0.8%) from the 3,679 counted in the 2000 census.

== Geography ==
According to the United States Census Bureau, the township had a total area of 3.00 square miles (7.76 km^{2}), including 2.94 square miles (7.61 km^{2}) of land and 0.06 square miles (0.15 km^{2}) of water (1.93%). The township is at an elevation of 863 feet (263 m) above sea level for the administrative center.

The township borders the Morris County municipalities of Dover, Randolph, Roxbury and Wharton.

== Demographics ==
Historical population
Census	Pop.	Note	%±
1930	1,422		—
1940	1,541		8.4%
1950	1,951		26.6%
1960	3,362		72.3%
1970	3,557		5.8%
1980	3,325		−6.5%
1990	3,333		0.2%
2000	3,679		10.4%
2010	3,651		−0.8%
2020	4,015		10.0%
2023 (est.)	4,006		−0.2%
Population sources: 1930 1940–2000; 2000 2010 2020

=== 2010 census ===
The 2010 United States census counted 3,651 people, 1,329 households, and 977 families in the township. The population density was 1,241.6 per square mile (479.4/km^{2}). There were 1,380 housing units at an average density of 469.3 per square mile (181.2/km^{2}). The racial makeup was 80.69% (2,946) White, 4.60% (168) Black or African American, 0.41% (15) Native American, 4.96% (181) Asian, 0.03% (1) Pacific Islander, 5.78% (211) from other races, and 3.53% (129) from two or more races. Hispanic or Latino of any race were 23.01% (840) of the population.

Of the 1,329 households, 31.8% had children under the age of 18; 57.7% were married couples living together; 9.9% had a female householder with no husband present and 26.5% were non-families. Of all households, 20.3% were made up of individuals and 7.2% had someone living alone who was 65 years of age or older. The average household size was 2.75 and the average family size was 3.16.

22.6% of the population were under the age of 18, 7.0% from 18 to 24, 27.6% from 25 to 44, 30.6% from 45 to 64, and 12.2% who were 65 years of age or older. The median age was 40.3 years. For every 100 females, the population had 97.0 males. For every 100 females ages 18 and older there were 96.3 males. The Census Bureau's 2006–2010 American Community Survey showed that (in 2010 inflation-adjusted dollars) median household income was $91,667 (with a margin of error of +/− $17,591) and the median family income was $103,532 (+/− $8,317). Males had a median income of $61,875 (+/− $13,249) versus $42,201 (+/− $13,280) for females. The per capita income for the township was $36,706 (+/− $3,887). About 2.4% of families and 3.3% of the population were below the poverty line, including none of those under age 18 and 5.2% of those age 65 or over.

=== 2000 census ===
At the 2000 United States census, there were 3,679 people, 1,365 households and 1,041 families residing in the township. The population density was 1,228.6 inhabitants per square mile (474.4/km^{2}). There were 1,388 housing units at an average density of 463.5 per square mile (179.0/km^{2}). The racial makeup of the township was 90.41% White, 3.42% African American, 0.11% Native American, 2.50% Asian, 0.08% Pacific Islander, 1.79% from other races, and 1.69% from two or more races. Hispanic or Latino of any race were 8.67% of the population.

There were 1,365 households, of which 33.7% had children under the age of 18 living with them, 61.2% were married couples living together, 10.6% had a female householder with no husband present, and 23.7% were non-families. 19.3% of all households were made up of individuals, and 6.9% had someone living alone who was 65 years of age or older. The average household size was 2.70 and the average family size was 3.08.

24.5% of the population were under the age of 18, 4.9% from 18 to 24, 34.3% from 25 to 44, 23.1% from 45 to 64, and 13.2% who were 65 years of age or older. The median age was 38 years. For every 100 females, there were 94.5 males. For every 100 females age 18 and over, there were 94.3 males.

The median household income was $64,643 and the median family income was $67,467. Males had a median income of $47,813 versus $37,250 for females. The per capita income for the township was $27,119. About 4.7% of families and 5.6% of the population were below the poverty line, including 8.7% of those under age 18 and 7.1% of those age 65 or over.

== Government ==
=== Local government ===
Mine Hill Township is governed within the Faulkner Act system of New Jersey municipal government, formally known as the Optional Municipal Charter Law, under Mayor-Council (Plan E), enacted as of January 1, 1980, based on the recommendations of a Charter Study Commission. The township is one of 71 municipalities (of the 565) statewide that use this form of government. The Mine Hill Township Council is comprised of five elected members, each chosen at-large by the voters of Mine Hill in partisan elections for a four-year term on a staggered basis as part of the November general election, with either two or three seats coming up for election in odd-numbered years, and the mayoral seat up at the same time that two council seats are up for vote. At the Council's organizational meeting each January, one member is elected to serve as Mayor for a twelve-month term and another is chosen to serve as Deputy Mayor.

As of 2026, the Mayor of Mine Hill Township is Republican Sam Morris, whose term of office ends December 31, 2027. Members of the Mine Hill Township Council are Council President Gary Colucci (D, 2029), Bret Coranato (R, 2027), Dina Cuccarro (D, 2029), Adam Trematore (D, 2029), and Fred Willis (R, 2027).

Dover serves as the lead agency operating a joint municipal court that also serves the neighboring municipalities of Mine Hill Township, Mount Arlington, Victory Gardens and Wharton. Established in 2009, the joint municipal court was forecast to offer annual savings in excess of $250,000 over the 10-year life of the agreement.

=== Federal, state, and county representation ===
Mine Hill Township is located in the 7th Congressional District and is part of New Jersey's 25th state legislative district. Prior to the 2010 Census, Mine Hill Township had been part of the 11th Congressional District, a change made by the New Jersey Redistricting Commission that took effect in January 2013, based on the results of the November 2012 general elections.

For the 119th United States Congress, New Jersey's 7th congressional district is represented by Thomas Kean Jr. (R, Westfield). New Jersey is represented in the United States Senate by Democrats Cory Booker (Newark, term ends 2027) and Andy Kim (Moorestown, term ends 2031).

For the 2026–2027 session, the 25th legislative district of the New Jersey Legislature is represented in the State Senate by Anthony M. Bucco (R, Boonton Township) and in the General Assembly by Aura K. Dunn (R, Mendham Borough) and Marisa Sweeney (D, Morristown).

Morris County is governed by a Board of County Commissioners comprised of seven members who are elected at-large in partisan elections to three-year terms on a staggered basis, with either one or three seats up for election each year as part of the November general election. Actual day-to-day operation of departments is supervised by County Administrator Deena Leary.

As of 2026, Morris County's Commissioners (with all terms ending December 31) are Director Stephen H. Shaw (R, Mountain Lakes, 2027), Deputy Director John Krickus (R, Washington Township, 2027), Douglas Cabana (R, Boonton Township, 2028), Thomas J. Mastrangelo (R, Montville, 2028), Christine Myers (R, Harding Township, 2028), Tayfun Selen (R, Chatham Township, 2026), and Deborah Smith (R, Denville Township, 2027).

The county's constitutional officers are County Clerk Ann F. Grossi (R, Parsippany–Troy Hills, 2028), Sheriff James M. Gannon (R, Boonton Township, 2025) and Surrogate Heather Darling (R, Roxbury, 2029).

=== Politics ===
United States presidential election results for Mine Hill Township 2024 2020 2016 2012 2008 2004
Year	Republican		Democratic		Third party(ies)	
Year	No.	%	No.	%	No.	%
2024	1,027	49.88%	986	47.89%	46	2.23%
2020	1,006	46.88%	1,104	51.44%	36	1.68%
2016	921	50.19%	836	45.56%	78	4.25%
2012	802	49.20%	799	49.02%	29	1.78%
2008	894	51.11%	835	47.74%	20	1.14%
2004	910	54.43%	751	44.92%	11	0.66%

As of March 2011, Mine Hill had a total of 2,197 registered voters, of which 513 (23.4%) were registered as Democrats, 669 (30.5%) were registered as Republicans, and 1,014 (46.2%) were registered as Unaffiliated. One voter was registered to another party.

In the 2012 presidential election, Republican Mitt Romney received 49.2% of the vote (802 cast), ahead of Democrat Barack Obama with 49.0% (799 votes), and other candidates with 1.8% (29 votes), among the 1,638 ballots cast by the township's 2,337 registered voters (8 ballots were spoiled), for a turnout of 70.1%. In the 2008 presidential election, Republican John McCain received 50.8% of the vote (894 cast), ahead of Democrat Barack Obama with 47.5% (835 votes) and other candidates with 1.1% (20 votes), among the 1,759 ballots cast by the township's 2,283 registered voters, for a turnout of 77.0%. In the 2004 presidential election, Republican George W. Bush received 54.3% of the vote (910 ballots cast), outpolling Democrat John Kerry with 44.8% (751 votes) and other candidates with 0.5% (11 votes), among the 1,675 ballots cast by the township's 2,270 registered voters, for a turnout percentage of 73.8.

Gubernatorial election results for Mine Hill Township
Year	Republican		Democratic		Third party(ies)	
Year	No.	%	No.	%	No.	%
2025	703	44.41%	872	55.09%	8	0.51%
2021	702	56.30%	536	42.98%	9	0.72%
2017	538	52.54%	453	44.24%	33	3.22%
2013	702	66.23%	337	31.79%	21	1.98%
2009	660	57.64%	361	31.53%	124	10.83%
2005	533	51.05%	467	44.73%	44	4.21%

In the 2013 gubernatorial election, Republican Chris Christie received 66.2% of the vote (702 cast), ahead of Democrat Barbara Buono with 31.8% (337 votes), and other candidates with 2.0% (21 votes), among the 1,080 ballots cast by the township's 2,331 registered voters (20 ballots were spoiled), for a turnout of 46.3%. In the 2009 gubernatorial election, Republican Chris Christie received 56.5% of the vote (660 ballots cast), ahead of Democrat Jon Corzine with 30.9% (361 votes), Independent Chris Daggett with 9.2% (108 votes) and other candidates with 1.4% (16 votes), among the 1,168 ballots cast by the township's 2,217 registered voters, yielding a 52.7% turnout.

United States Senate election results for Mine Hill Township1
Year	Republican		Democratic		Third party(ies)	
Year	No.	%	No.	%	No.	%
2024	913	47.75%	936	48.95%	63	3.29%
2018	762	51.35%	673	45.35%	49	3.30%
2012	740	49.07%	743	49.27%	25	1.66%
2006	536	53.39%	441	43.92%	27	2.69%

United States Senate election results for Mine Hill Township2
Year	Republican		Democratic		Third party(ies)	
Year	No.	%	No.	%	No.	%
2020	961	46.16%	1,092	52.45%	29	1.39%
2014	437	53.29%	357	43.54%	26	3.17%
2013	368	56.01%	280	42.62%	9	1.37%
2008	802	51.74%	709	45.74%	39	2.52%

== Education ==
The Mine Hill School District serves students in pre-kindergarten through sixth grade at Canfield Avenue School. As of the 2023–24 school year, the district, comprised of one school, had an enrollment of 371 students and 33.0 classroom teachers (on an FTE basis), for a student–teacher ratio of 11.2:1.

During the 1991–92 school year, Canfield Avenue School was recognized with the National Blue Ribbon School Award from the United States Department of Education, the highest honor that an American school can achieve.

For seventh through twelfth grades, public school students attend the schools of the Dover School District in Dover as part of a sending/receiving relationship. The district also serves students from Victory Gardens, which has been fully consolidated into the Dover School District since 2010. The high school was recognized with the National Blue Ribbon School Award in 2013. Schools in the Dover School District attended by Mine Hill students (with 2023–24 enrollment from the National Center for Education Statistics) are Dover Middle School with 511 students in grade 7–8 and Dover High School with 983 students in grades 9–12.

== Library services ==
The Mine Hill Township Library services are provided through the Morris County Library with Mobile library services provided at Town Hall. Residents may also use either the County College of Morris Library in Randolph or the Morris County Library in Morris Plains. Residents of Mine Hill cannot use any other local library in Morris County, because the township does not belong to the Morris County Library System.

== Transportation ==
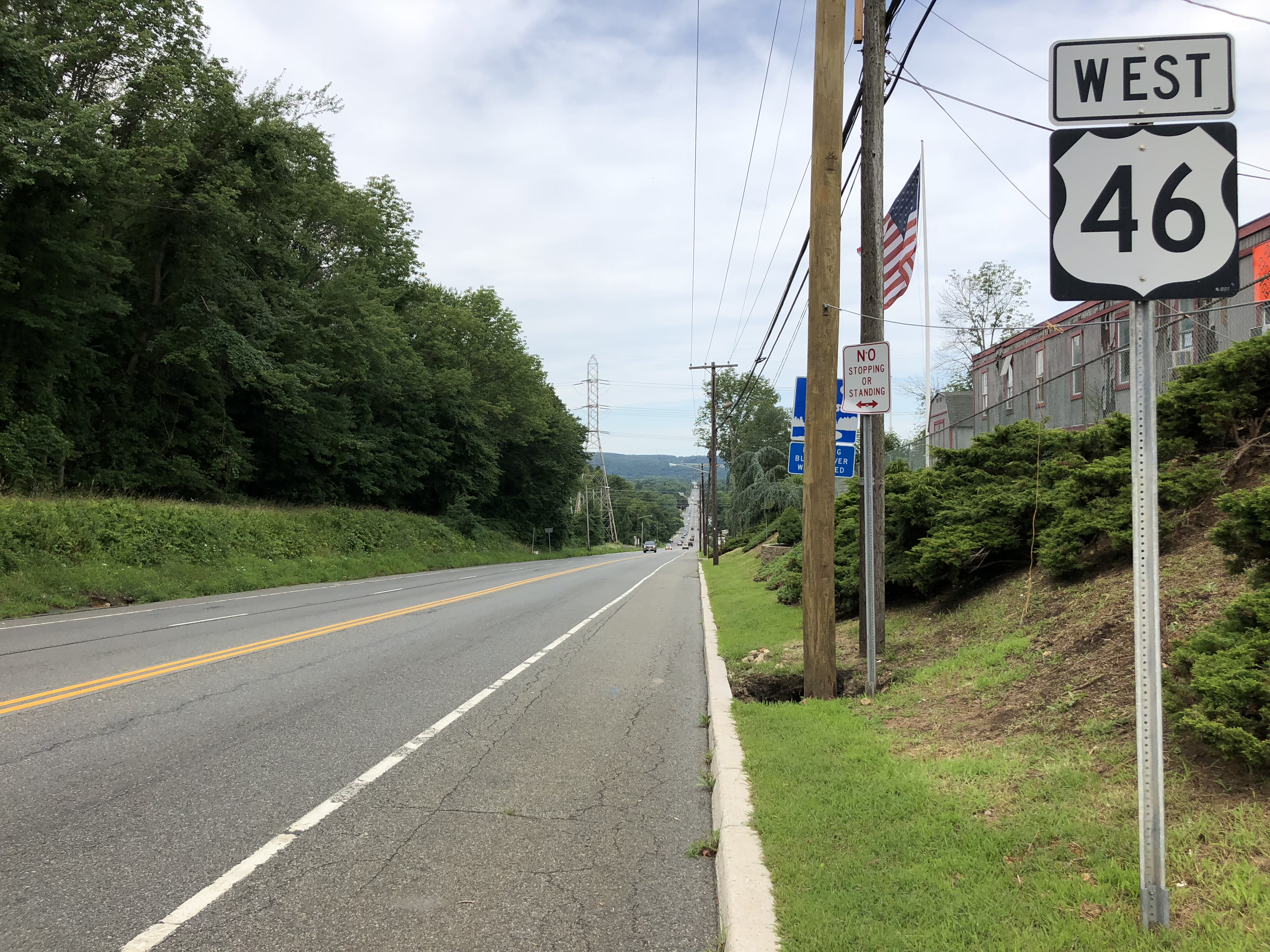
U.S. Route 46 westbound in Mine Hill Township

=== Roads and highways ===
As of May 2010, the township had a total of 20.65 miles (33.23 km) of roadways, of which 15.89 miles (25.57 km) were maintained by the municipality, 2.86 miles (4.60 km) by Morris County and 1.90 miles (3.06 km) by the New Jersey Department of Transportation.

U.S. Route 46 is the main highway serving Mine Hill Township. Interstate 80 and New Jersey Route 10 are accessible in adjacent municipalities.

=== Public transportation ===
NJ Transit provides Midtown Direct service at the Dover train station. Trains are available on the Montclair-Boonton Line and the Morristown Line to Newark Broad Street station, Secaucus Junction, New York Penn Station and Hoboken Terminal.

NJ Transit offered local bus service on the MCM5 route, which was eliminated in 2010 when subsidies to the local provider were eliminated as part of budget cuts.

== Notable people ==
People who were born in, residents of, or otherwise closely associated with Mine Hill Township include:

- Kathleen Clark, playwright
- Willie Cole (born 1955), contemporary sculptor, printer, and conceptual and visual artist
- BettyLou DeCroce (born 1952), politician who has served in the New Jersey General Assembly since 2012, where she has represented the 26th Legislative District, who served on the Mine Hill Township Council from 1981 to 1983
- Tim DiBisceglie (born 1994), professional soccer player who played for the Philadelphia Atoms in 2017–2019
- Roseann Quinn (1944–1973), schoolteacher whose murder inspired Judith Rossner's 1975 novel Looking for Mr. Goodbar, as well as its 1977 film adaptation
