= Gloria Montealegre =

American reporter and press secretary

Gloria Montealegre is a former television reporter and former deputy press secretary for ex-New Jersey Governor Jon S. Corzine. She was a longtime television news reporter for New Jersey Network and was the first female on-air reporter for New York's Channel 47, now Telemundo.

She immigrated to the United States from Colombia in the 1960s. She graduated from Dover High School in 1973.

Montealegre was the host of Images/Imagenes, a Latino public affairs show on the former New Jersey Network television station. The show was the longest public service television show on national public television.
