= Wilbur Lansing =

American baseball player

- Pitcher
- Born: January 13, 1929; Dover, New Jersey, U.S.
- Died: January 23, 2000 (aged 71); Parsippany, New Jersey, U.S.
- Batted: Unknown Threw: Unknown

Negro league baseball debut
- 1947, for the Newark Eagles

Last appearance
- 1950, for the Houston Eagles

Teams
- Newark/Houston Eagles (1947-1950)

Wilbur Frank Lansing Jr. (January 13, 1929 – January 23, 2000) was an American professional baseball pitcher in the Negro leagues. He played with the Newark/Houston Eagles from 1947 to 1950.

Lansing attended Dover High School and joined the Eagles in 1947.
