= Dover School District (New Jersey) =

School district in Morris County, New Jersey, US

Address
- 100 Grace Street Dover, Morris County, New Jersey, 07801; United States
- Coordinates: 40.897378°N 74.562576°W

District information
- Grades: PreK-12
- Superintendent: Luis A. Jaime Jr.
- Business administrator: Atilla Sabahoglu
- Schools: 5

Students and staff
- Enrollment: 3,448 (as of 2021–22)
- Faculty: 244.6 FTEs
- Student–teacher ratio: 14.1:1

Other information
- District Factor Group: A
- Website: www.dover-nj.org
Ind.	Per pupil	District spending	Rank (*)	K-12 average	%± vs. average
1A	Total Spending	$16,260	14	$18,891	−13.9%
1	Budgetary Cost	11,738	5	14,783	−20.6%
2	Classroom Instruction	7,392	15	8,763	−15.6%
6	Support Services	1,177	1	2,392	−50.8%
8	Administrative Cost	1,516	33	1,485	2.1%
10	Operations & Maintenance	1,280	10	1,783	−28.2%
13	Extracurricular Activities	339	19	268	26.5%
16	Median Teacher Salary	64,322	41	64,043
Data from NJDoE 2014 Taxpayers' Guide to Education Spending. *Of K-12 districts with 1,800-3,500 students. Lowest spending=1; Highest=68

The Dover School District is a comprehensive community public school district that serves students in pre-kindergarten through twelfth grade from Dover in Morris County, in the U.S. state of New Jersey.

As of the 2021–22 school year, the district, comprising five schools, had an enrollment of 3,448 students and 244.6 classroom teachers (on an FTE basis), for a student–teacher ratio of 14.1:1.

The district had been classified by the New Jersey Department of Education as being in District Factor Group "A", the lowest of eight groupings. District Factor Groups organize districts statewide to allow comparison by common socioeconomic characteristics of the local districts. From lowest socioeconomic status to highest, the categories are A, B, CD, DE, FG, GH, I and J.

Students in grades K-12 from Victory Gardens attend the schools of the Dover School District, which has been consolidated since 2010. Students in grades 7-12 from Mine Hill Township participate in the Dover district as part of a sending/receiving relationship.

== Schools ==
Schools in the district (with 2021–22 enrollment from the National Center for Education Statistics) are:

Elementary schools

- Academy Street Elementary School with 470 students in grades K-6
  - Nicholas Edwards, principal
- East Dover Elementary School with 389 students in grades K-6
  - Jennifer Stein, principal
- North Dover Elementary School with 658 students in grades PreK-6
  - Heather D. Carlton, principal

Middle school

- Dover Middle School with 524 students in grades 7-8
  - Michael McAuley, principal

High school

- Dover High School with 1,094 students in grades 9-12
  - Johanna Ross, principal

== Administration ==
Core members of the district's administration are:

- Luis A. Jaime Jr., superintendent
- Atilla Sabahoglu, business administrator and board secretary

== Board of education ==
The district's board of education, comprised of nine members, sets policy and oversees the fiscal and educational operation of the district through its administration. As a Type II school district, the board's trustees are elected directly by voters to serve three-year terms of office on a staggered basis, with three seats up for election each year held (since 2012) as part of the November general election. The board appoints a superintendent to oversee the district's day-to-day operations and a business administrator to supervise the business functions of the district.
