= Rafael Castro =

Dominican-American basketball player (born 2003)

No. 30 – Atlanta Hawks
- Position: Center
- League: NBA

Personal information
- Born: March 30, 2003 (age 23) Dover, New Jersey, U.S.
- Listed height: 6 ft 11 in (2.11 m)
- Listed weight: 224 lb (102 kg)

Career information
- High school: Dover (Dover, New Jersey)
- College: Providence (2022–2024); George Washington (2024–2026)
- NBA draft: 2026: undrafted
- Playing career: 2026–present

Career history
- 2026: Mexico City Capitanes
- 2026–present: Atlanta Hawks
- 2026–present: →College Park Skyhawks

Career highlights
- 2× Second-team All-Atlantic 10 (2025, 2026); 2× Atlantic-10 All-Defensive Team (2025, 2026)
- Stats at NBA.com
- Stats at Basketball Reference

Rafael Mauricio Castro (born March 30, 2003) is an American-Dominican basketball player for the Atlanta Hawks of the National Basketball Association (NBA), on a two-way contract with the College Park Skyhawks of the NBA G League. He played college basketball for the Providence Friars and George Washington Revolutionaries.

== Early life ==
Castro attended Dover High School in Dover, New Jersey, and committed to play college basketball for the Providence Friars over offers from other schools such as Dayton, Miami, Seton Hall, Xavier, and VCU.

== College career ==
As a freshman in 2021–22, Castro did not appear in any games and was redshirted. In the 2022–23 season, he averaged just 1.8 points on 6.5 minutes per game. In 2023–24, Castro averaged 2.9 points in 34 games played. After the season, he entered the NCAA transfer portal.

Castro transferred to play for the George Washington Revolutionaries. On November 12, 2024, he posted 12 points and 12 rebounds in a victory against North Carolina A&T. On January 15, 2025, Castro posted 27 points and 13 rebounds in a loss versus Duquesne. He finished the 2024–25 season, he averaged 14.0 points and 8.9 rebounds per game, earning All-Defensive and Second Team All-League honors. On December 31, 2025, Castro scored a season-high 27 points in a victory versus Richmond. He finished the 2025–26 season, averaging 15.3 points, 9.1 rebounds, 1.8 steals, and 1.7 blocks per game. After the conclusion of the season, Castro prepared for the 2026 NBA draft, accepting an invite to the NBA scouting combine.

== Professional career ==
After going undrafted in the 2026 NBA draft, Castro signed a two-way contract with the Milwaukee Bucks.

On August 26, 2026, Castro signed a two-way contract with the Houston Rockets.

On October 9, 2026, Castro signed an Exhibit 10 contract with the Los Angeles Lakers.

On November 16, 2026, Castro signed a two-way contract with Atlanta Hawks
