= Dover High School (New Jersey) =

High school in Morris County, New Jersey, US

Location
- 100 Grace Street; Dover, Morris County, New Jersey 07801; United States
- 40.897378°N 74.562576°W

Information
- Type: Public high school
- School district: Dover School District
- NCES School ID: 340393004212
- Principal: Johanna Ross
- Faculty: 92.2 FTEs
- Grades: 9-12
- Enrollment: 1,167 (as of 2024–25)
- Student to teacher ratio: 12.7:1
- Colors: Black and orange
- Athletics conference: Northwest Jersey Athletic Conference (general); North Jersey Super Football Conference (football)
- Team name: Tigers
- Newspaper: Tiger Tales
- Website: dhs.dover-nj.org

Dover High School is a four-year public high school located in Dover in Morris County, in the U.S. state of New Jersey, serving students in ninth through twelfth grades and operating as the lone secondary school of the Dover School District.

The high school serves students from Victory Gardens, which has been consolidated into the Dover School District since 2010. Students from Mine Hill Township attend the high school as part of a sending/receiving relationship.

As of the 2024–25 school year, the school had an enrollment of 1,167 students and 92.2 classroom teachers (on an FTE basis), for a student–teacher ratio of 12.7:1. There were 611 students (52.4% of enrollment) eligible for free lunch and 81 (6.9% of students) eligible for reduced-cost lunch.

== History ==
Dover High School had served students from Denville Township, Hanover Township, Hopatcong, Jefferson Township, Randolph and Rockaway Township, before those districts terminated their sending/receiving relationships and either created their own high schools or established relationships with other receiving districts.

Students from Jefferson Township and Randolph left the school after Randolph High School opened in September 1961.

== Awards, recognition and rankings ==
In September 2013, the school was one of 15 in New Jersey to be recognized by the United States Department of Education as part of the National Blue Ribbon Schools Program, an award called the "most prestigious honor in the United States' education system" and which Education Secretary Arne Duncan described as schools that "represent examples of educational excellence".

The school was the 238th-ranked public high school in New Jersey out of 339 schools statewide in New Jersey Monthly magazine's September 2014 cover story on the state's "Top Public High Schools", using a new ranking methodology. The school had been ranked 223rd in the state of 328 schools in 2012, after being ranked 220th in 2010 out of 322 schools listed. The magazine ranked the school 215th in 2008 out of 316 schools. The school was ranked 229th in the magazine's September 2006 issue, which surveyed 316 schools across the state. Schooldigger.com ranked the school 172nd out of 381 public high schools statewide in its 2011 rankings (an increase of 89 positions from the 2010 ranking) which were based on the combined percentage of students classified as proficient or above proficient on the mathematics (85.2%) and language arts literacy (88.8%) components of the High School Proficiency Assessment (HSPA).

U.S. News released the 2023-2024 Rankings in which Dover High School was ranked #3,363 nationally. At the New Jersey state level, they were ranked #138 and #343 in the NYC Metro Area High Schools.

== Extracurricular activities ==
Dover High School offers many extracurricular activities after school. Below is a list of some of the activities available:

- Key Club
- Tigers For Charity
- Botball
- History Club
- Dover Debate
- Fall Play
- Spring Musical
- Drama Club
- Perfect Step
- Latin Mix
- Chess Club
- Jazz Band
- Marching Band
- Tigers In Christ
- Bowling Club
- Student Council
- Interact Club

== Athletics ==
The Dover High School Tigers compete in the Northwest Jersey Athletic Conference, which is comprised of public and private high schools in Morris, Sussex and Warren counties, and was established following a reorganization of sports leagues in Northern New Jersey by the New Jersey State Interscholastic Athletic Association (NJSIAA). Prior to the 2010 realignment, the school had participated in the Hills division of the Iron Hills Conference, an athletic conference that included high schools located in Essex, Morris and Union counties. With 762 students in grades 10-12, the school was classified by the NJSIAA for the 2019–20 school year as Group III for most athletic competition purposes, which included schools with an enrollment of 761 to 1,058 students in that grade range. The football team competes in the Ivy White division of the North Jersey Super Football Conference, which includes 112 schools competing in 20 divisions, making it the nation's biggest football-only high school sports league. The football team is one of the 12 programs assigned to the two Ivy divisions starting in 2020, which are intended to allow weaker programs ineligible for playoff participation to compete primarily against each other. The school was classified by the NJSIAA as Group IV North for football for 2024–2026, which included schools with 893 to 1,315 students.

The boys cross country team won the Group III state championship in 1946-1949.

The football team won the NJSIAA North II Group II state sectional championship in 1984, 1992 and 1996. Down early by a score of 14-0, the 1984 team came back with four touchdowns to defeat Warren Hills Regional High School by a score of 26-17 to win the North II Group II championship game and finish the season with a record of 8-3.

The boys' wrestling team won the North II Group II state sectional championship in 1988.

In 2002, the boys' soccer team won the North II, Group II state sectional championship, defeating Parsippany High School 1-0 in the tournament final. In 2017 they also won the North II, Group II state sectional championship, defeating Harrison High School 3-0 in the tournament final. In the process making school history by making it to the Group II state final for the first time, ultimately losing to Holmdel High School 4-1 at Kean University.

== Administration ==
The school's principal is Johanna Ross, whose core administration team includes two vice principals.

== Notable alumni ==
- Rafael Castro (born 2003), college basketball player
- Kathleen Clark, playwright
- Wilbur Lansing (1929–2000), baseball pitcher in the Negro leagues who played with the Newark/Houston Eagles from 1947 to 1950
- Ben Loory (born 1971), short fiction writer
- Jacque MacKinnon (1938-1975, class of 1957), American football tight end who played professionally for the San Diego Chargers and the Oakland Raiders
- Gloria Montealegre, former television reporter for New Jersey Network who was deputy press secretary for New Jersey Governor Jon S. Corzine
- David Thorburn (class of 1958), scholar and writer, who is a Professor of Literature and Media Studies at the Massachusetts Institute of Technology
- Edgar Tillyer (1881–1970), astronomer, computer and lens designer who was the director of research at the American Optical Company
- Shirley Turner (born 1941, class of 1960), politician who has represented the 15th Legislative District in the New Jersey Senate since 1998
