= Blackwell Street Historic District =

Area in Morris County, New Jersey, United States

- U.S. National Register of Historic Places
- U.S. Historic district
- New Jersey Register of Historic Places
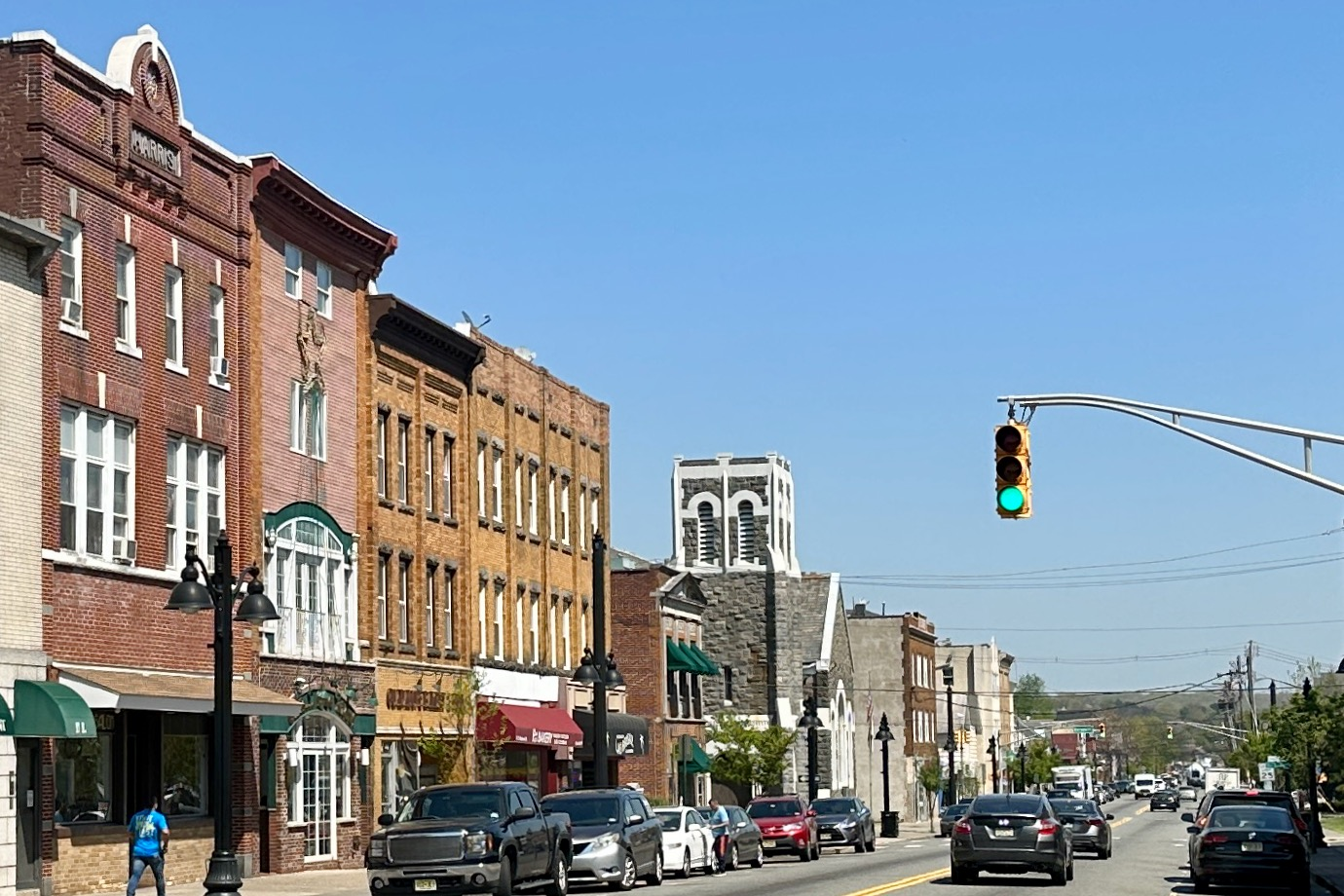
- Blackwell Street from Morris Street, showing the Harris Building and the Methodist Church

- Location within Morris County, New Jersey Location within New Jersey Location within the United States
- Location: Parts of Blackwell, Dickerson, Sussex, Bergen, Essex, Morris, Warren, Prospect and Dewey streets, Dover, New Jersey
- Coordinates: 40°53′4″N 74°33′34″W
- Area: 25 acres (10 ha)
- Built: 1827
- Architectural style: Second Empire, Renaissance, Italianate
- NRHP reference No.: 82003287
- NJRHP No.: 2108

Significant dates
- Added to NRHP: May 21, 1982
- Designated NJRHP: March 24, 1982

The Blackwell Street Historic District is a 25-acre (10 ha) historic district along Blackwell, Dickerson, Sussex, Bergen, Essex, Morris, Warren, Prospect and Dewey streets in the town of Dover in Morris County, New Jersey. It was added to the National Register of Historic Places on May 21, 1982, for its significance in architecture, commerce, education, performing arts, religion, and transportation.

The district has 52 contributing buildings, one contributing site, and two contributing structures. Contributing buildings include the Baker Building and the Dover station, which were previously listed individually on the NRHP.

== History and description ==
In 1817, New York City iron merchants, Joseph Blackwell and Henry McFarlan, received about 450 acres (180 ha) in the area to settle accounts after the depression following the War of 1812. In 1825, after the announcement of the Morris Canal, they laid out a plan for the community and started its development. The town of Dover was incorporated in 1869 and George Richards was elected its first mayor. That same year, he built a large commercial building on Blackwell Street. It was a J. J. Newberry store in the 1940s. The red brick Dover station was built in 1901 by the Delaware, Lackawanna and Western Railroad. The three-story Harris Building at 19 East Blackwell Street was built with red brick in 1913.

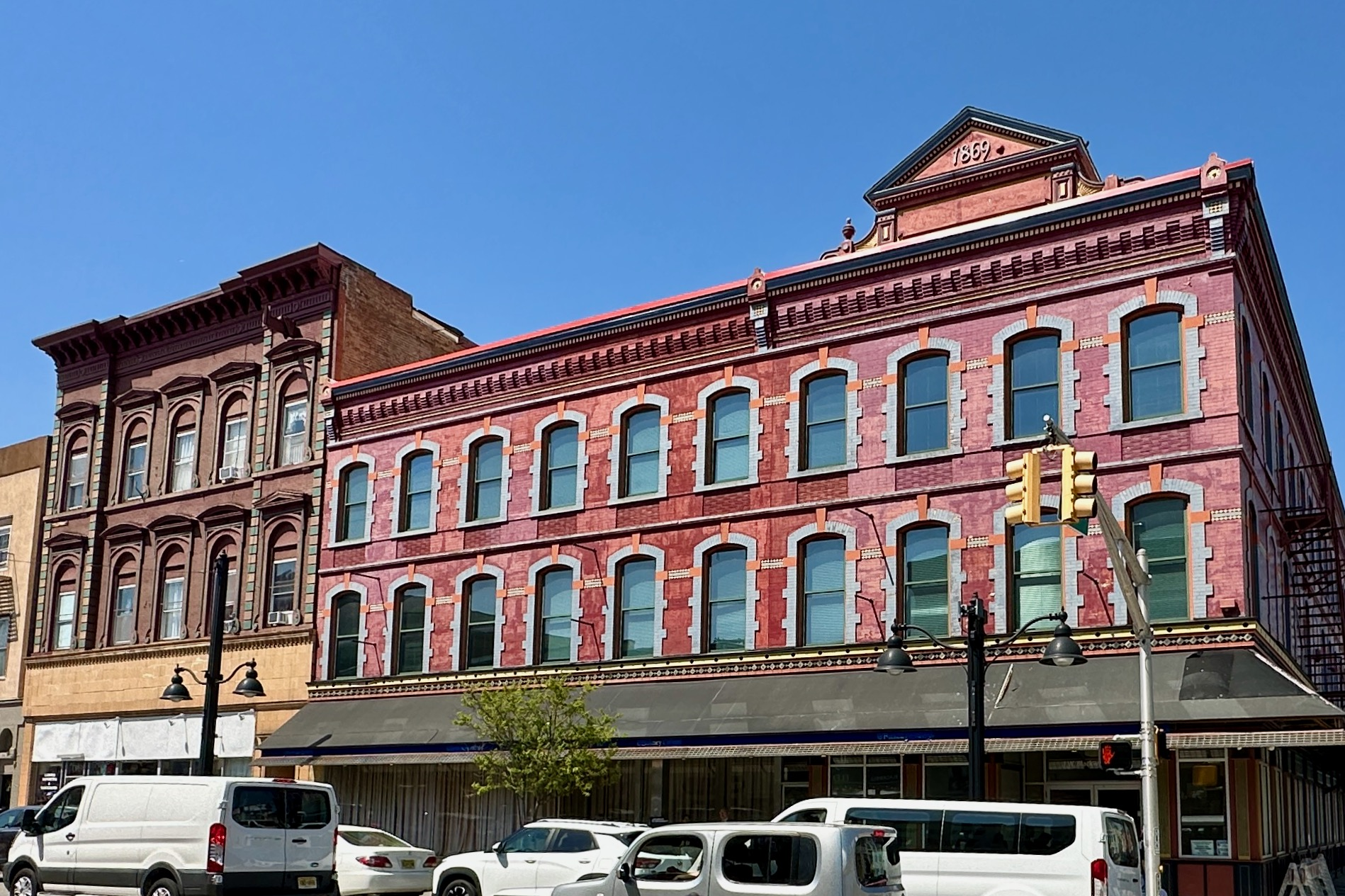
George Richards Building and National Union Bank

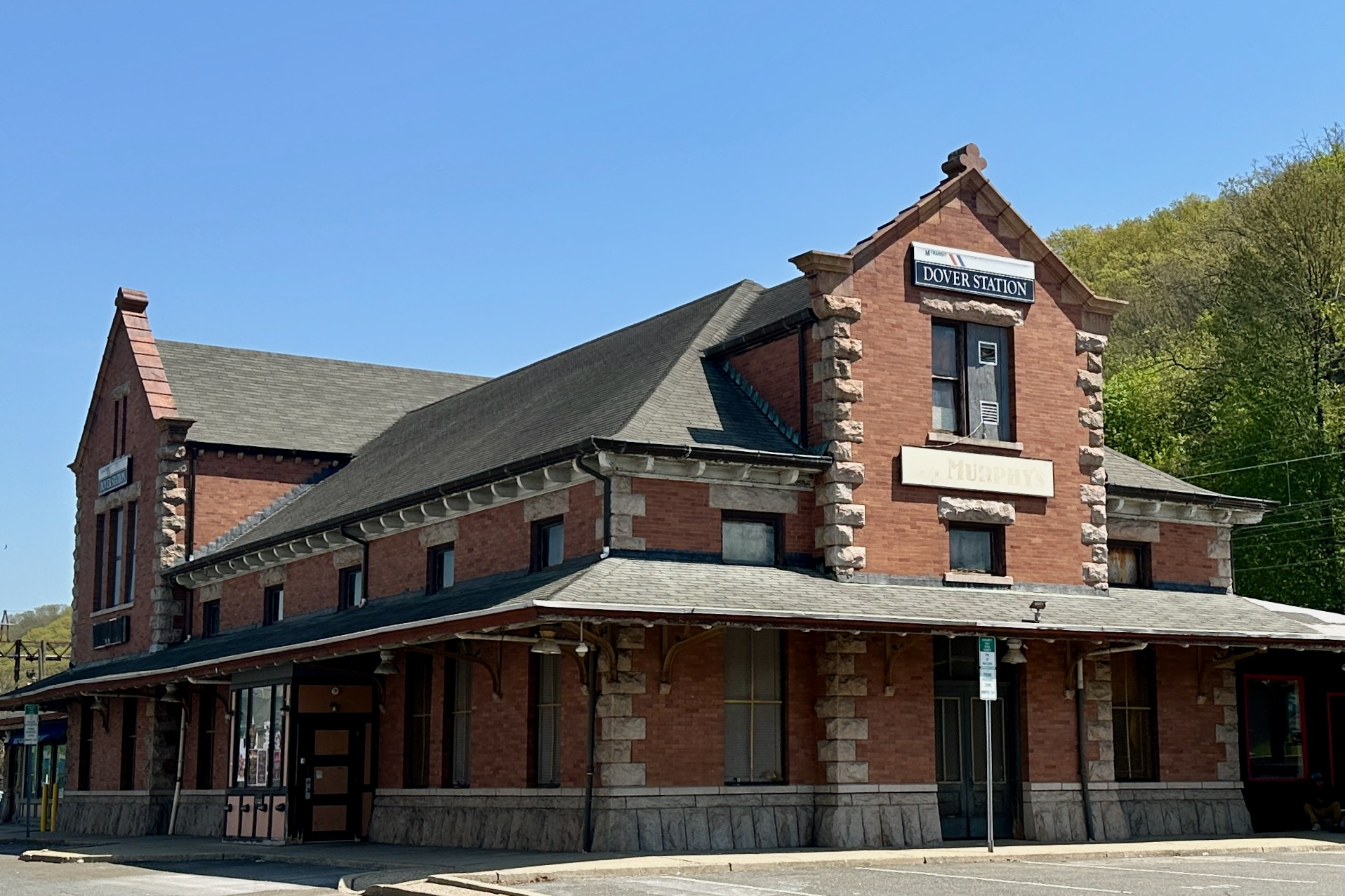
Dover station

There are three stone churches in the district that are key contributing properties. The oldest one is St. John's Episcopal Church built in 1871 and located on the south side of Blackwell Street between Essex and Bergen streets. It was designed by architect Richard Upjohn and features Gothic Revival architectural style. During the influenza epidemic of 1918, the parish house was used as a hospital by the town. The First United Methodist Church, historically known as the Methodist Episcopal Church, is located on the northwest corner of Blackwell and Essex streets and features Romanesque Revival and Gothic Revival architectural styles. The oldest section of the church was built in 1872. The cornerstone for the newer section was placed in April 1907 and the dedication of the church was in June 1908. The First Memorial Presbyterian Church, historically known as Hoagland Memorial Presbyterian Church, is located at 51 West Blackwell Street and features Romanesque Revival architecture. Completed in 1901, it was funded by Hudson Hoagland as a memorial for his wife and is the third church building for the congregation. Its bell tower, 120 feet (37 m) tall, is the highest point on the street. The Condict House, also known as the Presbyterian Church House, is located at 55 West Blackwell Street and features Colonial Revival architecture. Built c. 1890, it was used by Dr. Arthur Windes Condict and is now owned by the Dover Area Historical Society.

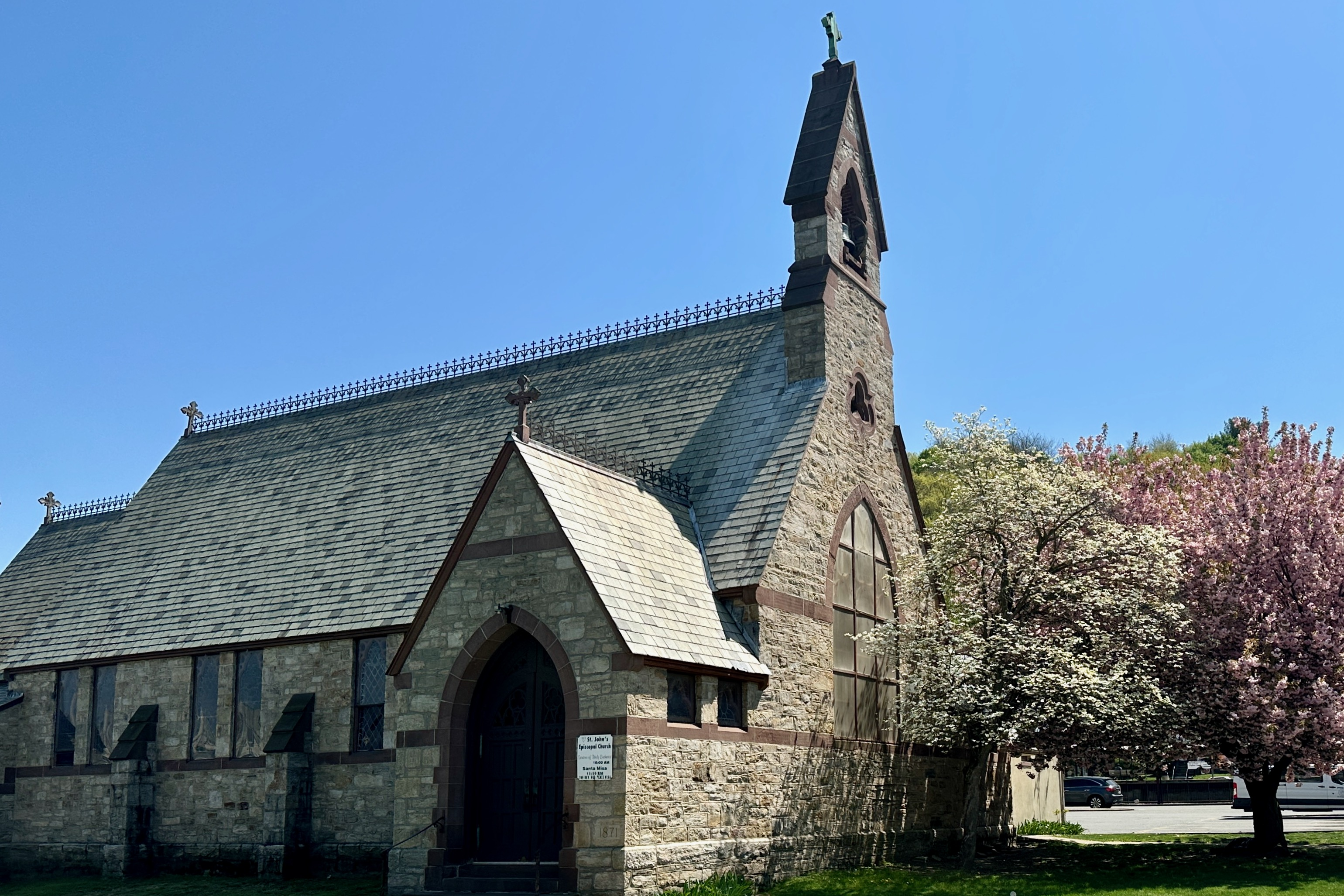
St. John's Episcopal Church

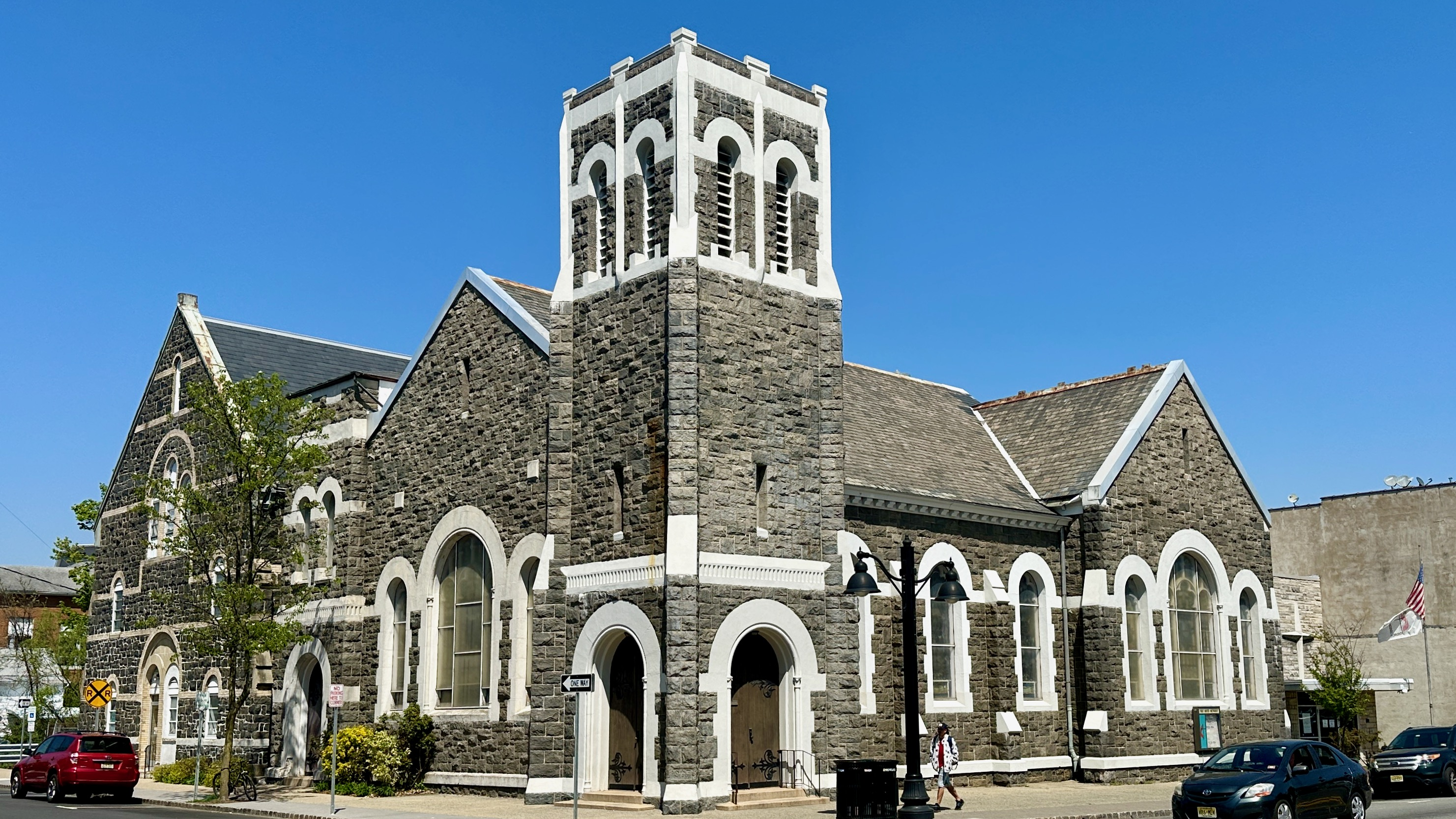
First United Methodist Church

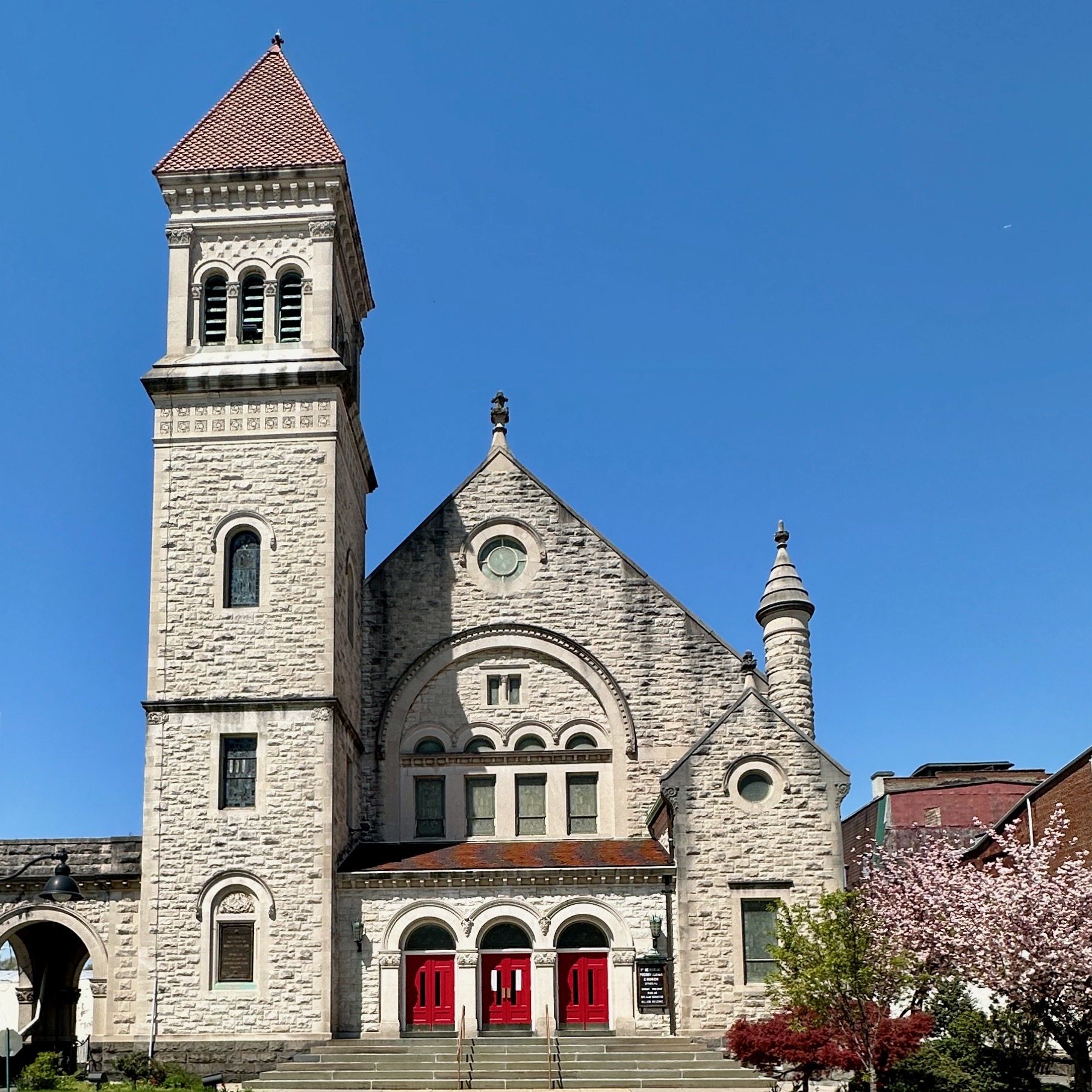
First Memorial Presbyterian Church

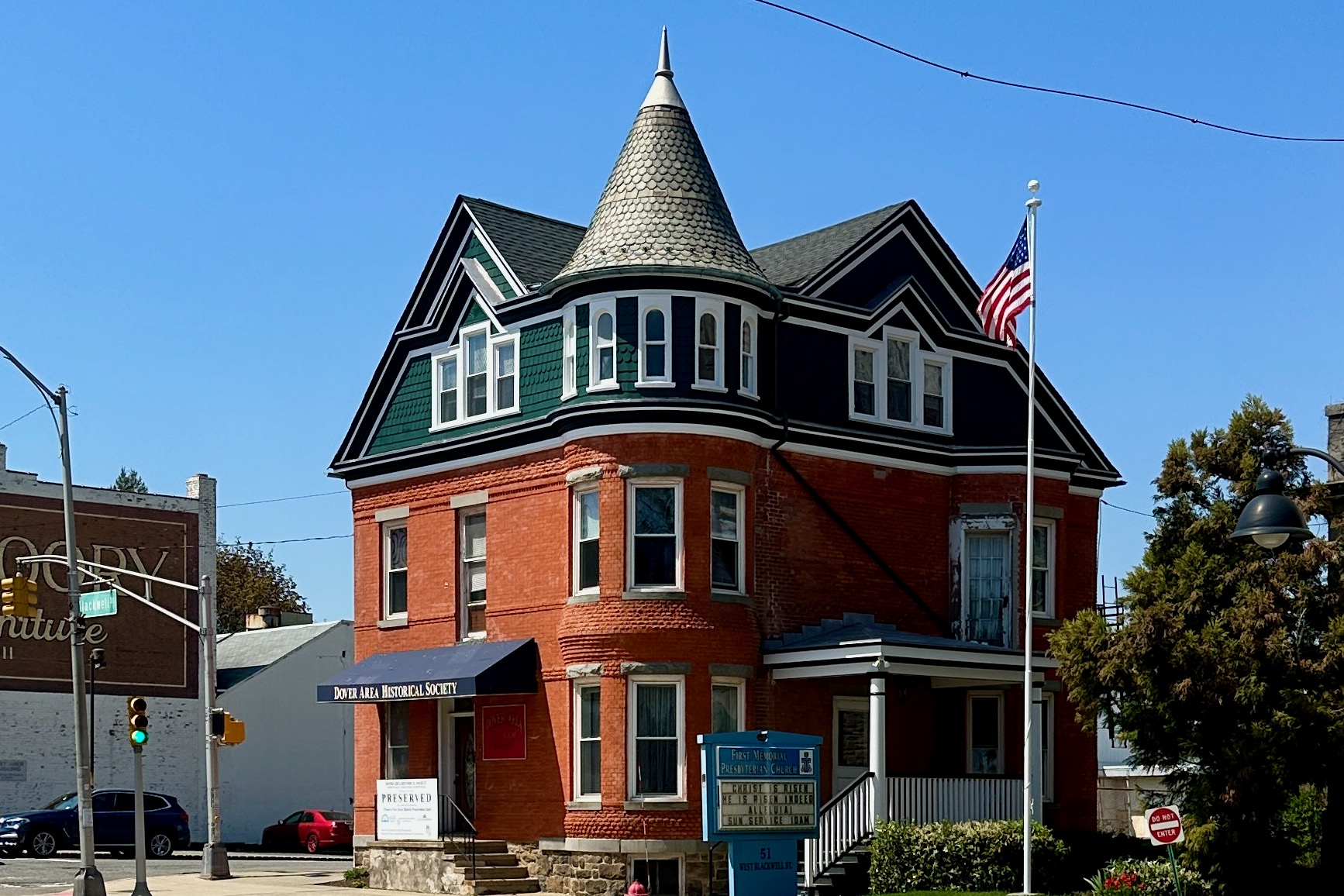
Dover Area Historical Society

== See also ==
- National Register of Historic Places listings in Morris County, New Jersey
