= Paula Kassell =

American feminist leader

- Born: Paula S. Kassell; December 5, 1917; New York City, New York, U.S.
- Died: August 20, 2012 (age 94); Dover, New Jersey, U.S.

Paula S. Kassell (December 5, 1917 – August 20, 2012) was an American feminist leader who founded New Directions for Women, which was the first national feminist news publication in the United States, was an early board member and officer of the Women's Institute for Freedom of the Press and successfully pushed The New York Times to use the term "Ms." in reference to women.

== Early life ==
Kassell was born on December 5, 1917, in New York City. At age 6, her family moved to Yonkers, New York. Her father was a stockbroker and her mother was a housewife. Kassell graduated from Barnard College in 1939. According to an article published in New Directions for Women in the winter of 1976-77, after graduating, Kassell pursued a job as a social worker, and continued to work until she got married and stayed home to raise her two children. Kassell was inspired to become a feminist after reading anthropological works of Margaret Mead while at Barnard. She started working for Bell Labs in 1955, where she was the first woman employed as a technical editor.

== Career ==
In 1971, she became one of the co-founders of New Directions for Women and used money raised by its inaugural May 1971 conference to create a magazine that she edited out of her home together with other volunteers. The newspaper, which started with a press run of 2,000 copies reproduced by mimeograph and had grown to printing 50,000 copies that were sent to 15 states and to readers in Canada by March 1973, was cited as "the country's first statewide feminist newspaper". Nationwide distribution of the newspaper began in 1975 and by 1977 the paper had relocated to offices in Westwood, New Jersey.

Kassell bought shares of The New York Times and attended the company's April 1986 shareholder meeting, where she spoke about the inconsistent use of the titles "Miss" and "Mrs." used to refer to women and the fact that this usage created confusion and inaccuracies about the marital status of those women mentioned in the paper. Arthur Ochs Sulzberger, the publisher of the paper, agreed to look into the issue and make a "rational decision" on the topic after discussion with usage experts. Sulzberger agreed with her argument and the paper started using the term Ms. as stated in an editor's note published on June 20, 1986, citing the fact that the term had "become a part of the language" in its decision to change its policy. She remained involved with the Morris County, New Jersey, chapter of the National Organization for Women until her death.

== Personal life ==
A resident of Dover, New Jersey, Kassell died in her home at the age of 94 on August 20, 2012. Her husband, Gerson G. Friedman, died before her, as did a daughter who died of breast cancer. She was survived by a son and two grandchildren. She donated her body to the New Jersey Medical School.
