= Dover, New Jersey =

Town in Morris County, New Jersey, US

- Town
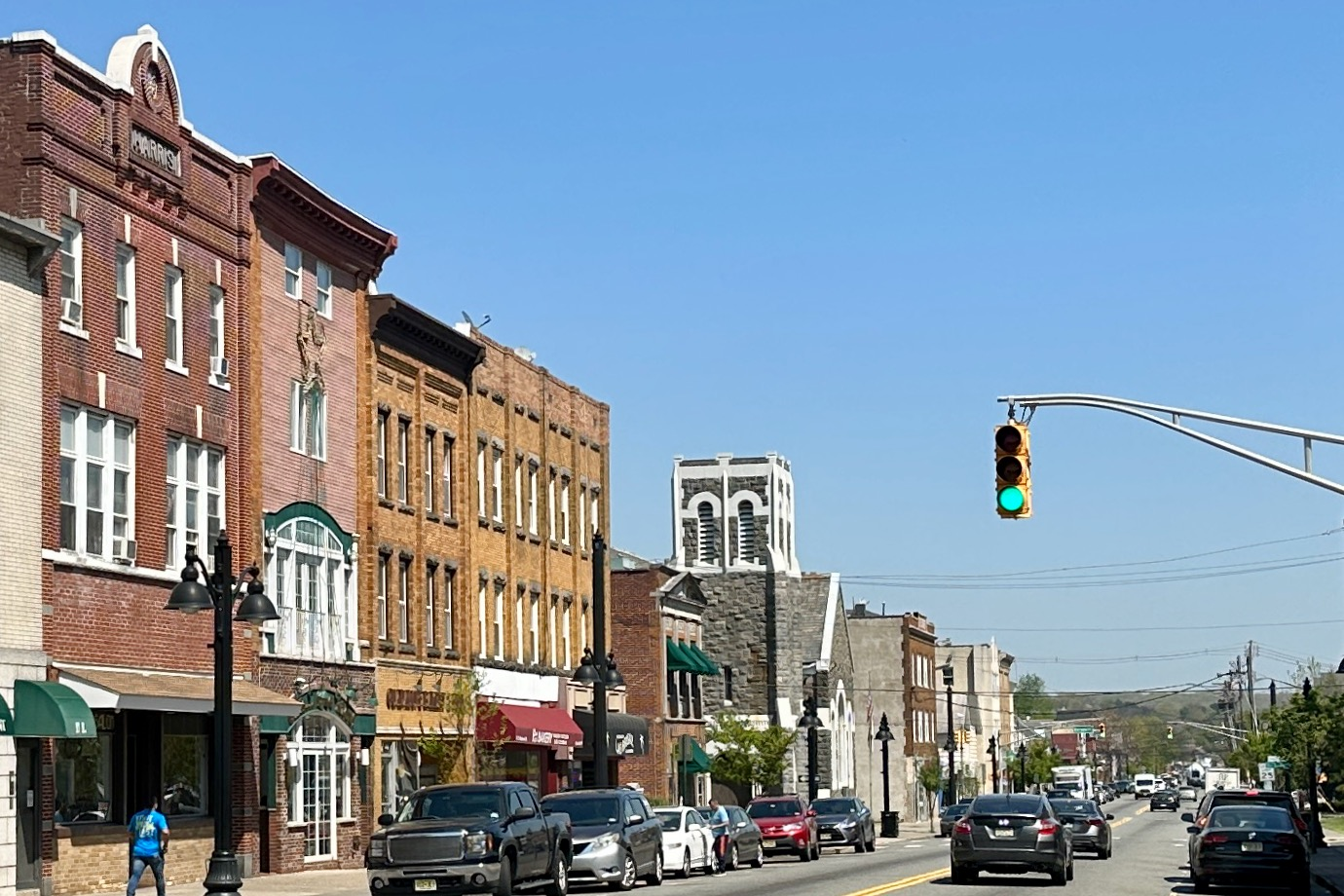
- Blackwell Street Historic District, listed on the National Register of Historic Places

- Seal

- Location of Dover in Morris County highlighted in red (right). Inset map: Location of Morris County in New Jersey highlighted in orange (left).

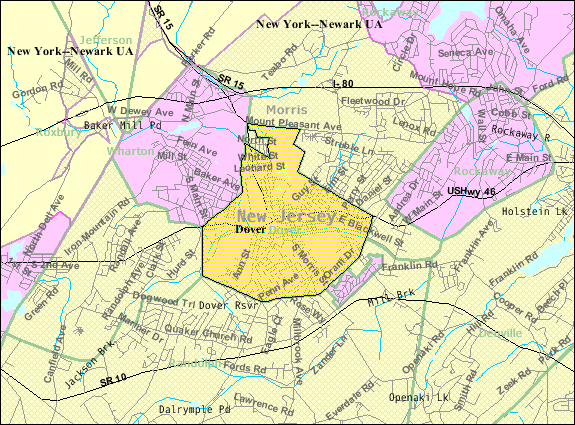
- Census Bureau map of Dover, New Jersey
- Interactive map of Dover, New Jersey
- Location in Morris County Location in New Jersey Location in the United States
- Coordinates: 40.8856°N 74.559163°W
- Country: United States
- State: New Jersey
- County: Morris
- Incorporated: April 1, 1869
- Independent: March 5, 1896
- Named for: Dover, England or Dover, New Hampshire

Government
  - Type: Town
  - Body: Town Council
  - Mayor: James P. Dodd (D, term ends December 31, 2027)
  - Administrator: Dr. Edward Ramirez
  - Municipal clerk: Tara M. Pettoni

Area
  - Total: 2.73 sq mi (7.06 km^{2})
  - Land: 2.68 sq mi (6.93 km^{2})
  - Water: 0.050 sq mi (0.13 km^{2}) 1.90%
  - Rank: 362nd of 565 in state 29th of 39 in county
- Elevation: 558 ft (170 m)

Population (2020)
  - Total: 18,460
  - Estimate (2023): 18,435
  - Rank: 148th of 565 in state 10th of 39 in county
  - Density: 6,898.4/sq mi (2,663.5/km^{2})
  - Rank: 68th of 565 in state 3rd of 39 in county
- Time zone: UTC−05:00 (Eastern (EST))
  - Summer (DST): UTC−04:00 (Eastern (EDT))
- ZIP Codes: 07801–07803, 07806, 07809
- Area code: 973
- FIPS code: 3402718070
- GNIS feature ID: 0885196
- Website: www.dover.nj.us

Dover is a town in Morris County, in the U.S. state of New Jersey. Located on the Rockaway River, Dover is about 31 miles (50 km) west of New York City and about 23 miles (37 km) west of Newark, New Jersey. As of the 2020 United States census, the town's population was 18,460, its highest decennial census count ever and an increase of 303 (+1.7%) from the 2010 census count of 18,157, which in turn had reflected a decline of 31 (−0.2%) from the 18,188 counted at the 2000 census.

Dover is a majority minority community, with nearly 70% of the population as of the 2010 census identifying themselves as Hispanic, up from 25% in 1980.

== History ==
Joseph Latham was deeded the land that includes present-day Dover in 1713, from portions of land that had been purchased from Native Americans by the Proprietors of West Jersey. On May 31, 1722, Latham and his wife Jane deeded 527 acres (2.13 km^{2}) over to John Jackson of Flushing, New York. Jackson settled on the eastern portion of his land along Granny's Brook at the site of what would later become the Ross Ribbon Factory on Park Heights Avenue.

Iron ore at the time was so plentiful that it could be collected off the ground at the nearby Dickerson Mine in Mine Hill. At Jackson's Forge, ore would be processed into bars that would then be transported to Paterson and other industrial areas towards the east. The passage of the Iron Act by the British Parliament led to financial difficulties, leading Jackson into bankruptcy in 1753, with all of his property and belongings sold off at a Sheriff's sale. Quaker Hartshorne Fitz Randolph purchased Jackson's property and annexed to his own existing property, which would later become part of Randolph Township.

Dover was incorporated as a town on April 1, 1869, within Randolph Township and became fully independent as of March 5, 1896. The town charter was amended in 1875. On May 7, 1896, Dover was reincorporated as a city and regained its status as a town on March 21, 1899, after the referendum that approved the change was invalidated by a court ruling.

In its past, Dover has had extensive iron and mill works, machine shops, stove, furnace, and range works, boiler and bridge works, rolling mills, drill works, knitting and silk mills, and a large hosiery factory (MacGregors). During this period, Dover was a port on the Morris Canal while it was operational; the boat basin was located at what is today the JFK Commons Park.

Sources attribute the town's name to Dover, England or Dover, New Hampshire.

== Geography ==
According to the United States Census Bureau, the town had a total area of 2.73 square miles (7.06 km^{2}), including 2.68 square miles (6.93 km^{2}) of land and 0.05 square miles (0.13 km^{2}) of water (1.90%).

The borough borders the Morris County municipalities of Mine Hill Township, Randolph, Rockaway Township, Victory Gardens and Wharton.

== Demographics ==
Historical population
Census	Pop.	Note	%±
1880	2,958		—
1900	5,938		—
1910	7,468		25.8%
1920	9,803		31.3%
1930	10,031		2.3%
1940	10,491		4.6%
1950	11,174		6.5%
1960	13,034		16.6%
1970	15,039		15.4%
1980	14,681		−2.4%
1990	15,115		3.0%
2000	18,188		20.3%
2010	18,157		−0.2%
2020	18,460		1.7%
2023 (est.)	18,435	▼	−0.1%
Population sources: 1880–1920; 1890–1910 1880–1930; 1940–2000 2000; 2010 2020

=== 2020 census ===
As of the 2020 census, Dover had a population of 18,460. The median age was 38.3 years. 21.2% of residents were under the age of 18 and 12.6% of residents were 65 years of age or older. For every 100 females there were 103.2 males, and for every 100 females age 18 and over there were 102.6 males age 18 and over.

100.0% of residents lived in urban areas, while 0.0% lived in rural areas.

There were 5,752 households in Dover, of which 38.3% had children under the age of 18 living in them. Of all households, 42.6% were married-couple households, 19.4% were households with a male householder and no spouse or partner present, and 28.0% were households with a female householder and no spouse or partner present. About 21.4% of all households were made up of individuals and 10.1% had someone living alone who was 65 years of age or older.

There were 5,972 housing units, of which 3.7% were vacant. The homeowner vacancy rate was 0.7% and the rental vacancy rate was 2.1%.

Racial composition as of the 2020 census
Race	Number	Percent
White	4,721	25.6%
Black or African American	955	5.2%
American Indian and Alaska Native	377	2.0%
Asian	442	2.4%
Native Hawaiian and Other Pacific Islander	6	0.0%
Some other race	7,433	40.3%
Two or more races	4,526	24.5%
Hispanic or Latino (of any race)	14,209	77.0%

=== 2010 census ===
The 2010 United States census counted 18,157 people, 5,562 households, and 3,877 families in the town. The population density was 6,765.5 per square mile (2,612.2/km^{2}). There were 5,783 housing units at an average density of 2,154.8 per square mile (832.0/km^{2}). The racial makeup was 66.55% (12,083) White, 6.10% (1,108) Black or African American, 0.63% (114) Native American, 2.54% (461) Asian, 0.05% (9) Pacific Islander, 19.88% (3,610) from other races, and 4.25% (772) from two or more races. Hispanic or Latino of any race were 69.38% (12,598) of the population.

Of the 5,562 households, 33.0% had children under the age of 18; 43.6% were married couples living together; 15.7% had a female householder with no husband present and 30.3% were non-families. Of all households, 22.6% were made up of individuals and 9.5% had someone living alone who was 65 years of age or older. The average household size was 3.21 and the average family size was 3.54.

21.6% of the population were under the age of 18, 10.5% from 18 to 24, 32.8% from 25 to 44, 24.5% from 45 to 64, and 10.5% who were 65 years of age or older. The median age was 35.5 years. For every 100 females, the population had 110.9 males. For every 100 females ages 18 and older there were 111.2 males.

The Census Bureau's 2006–2010 American Community Survey showed that (in 2010 inflation-adjusted dollars) median household income was $59,454 (with a margin of error of +/− $3,227) and the median family income was $61,187 (+/− $2,750). Males had a median income of $34,722 (+/− $4,750) versus $28,098 (+/− $4,993) for females. The per capita income for the town was $21,581 (+/− $990). About 3.6% of families and 10.3% of the population were below the poverty line, including 12.8% of those under age 18 and 15.8% of those age 65 or over.

The 2010 Census showed that Dover's Hispanic population accounted for 69.4% of all residents, ranked fifth in the state by percentage, while 13% of New Jersey's population was Hispanic; the city was one of 13 municipalities in the state with a Hispanic majority. The town had notable percentages of residents who were Colombians (15.2% of all residents), Mexicans (14.9%), Puerto Ricans (11.1%), Ecuadorians (5.6%), Hondurans (4.7%) and Peruvians (2.8%), with smaller percentages (from 1-2%) of Costa Ricans, Uruguayans, Chileans and Salvadorans.

=== 2000 census ===
As of the 2000 United States census there were 18,188 people, 5,436 households, and 3,919 families residing in Dover. The population density was 6,788.2 inhabitants per square mile (2,620.9/km^{2}). There were 5,568 housing units at an average density of 2,078.1 per square mile (802.4/km^{2}). The racial makeup of the town was 69.45% White, 6.83% African American, 0.34% Native American, 2.47% Asian, 0.03% Pacific Islander, 15.99% from other races, and 4.89% from two or more races. Hispanic or Latino of any race were 57.94% of the population.

11.27% of Dover residents identified themselves as being of Colombian American ancestry in the 2000 Census, the second-highest percentage of the population of any municipality in the United States (behind neighboring Victory Gardens, New Jersey, which had 15.27% of residents so identified) with 1,000 residents identifying their ancestry.

There were 5,436 households, out of which 35.7% had children under the age of 18 living with them, 50.2% were married couples living together, 13.5% had a female householder with no husband present, and 27.9% were non-families. 21.3% of all households were made up of individuals, and 8.7% had someone living alone who was 65 years of age or older. The average household size was 3.29 and the average family size was 3.55.

By age, the population of the town is distributed relatively evenly, with 23.2% under the age of 18, 10.5% from 18 to 24, 36.0% from 25 to 44, 19.8% from 45 to 64, and 10.6% who were 65 years of age or older. The median age was 34 years. For every 100 females, there were 106.4 males. For every 100 females age 18 and over, there were 106.7 males.

The median income for a household in the town was $53,423, and the median income for a family was $57,141. Males had a median income of $31,320 versus $27,413 for females. The per capita income for the town was $18,056. About 8.2% of families and 13.4% of the population were below the poverty line, including 14.5% of those under age 18 and 7.1% of those age 65 or over.

Dover has a large Hispanic population with the largest concentrations being of Mexican, Colombian, Dominican and Puerto Rican ancestry. Hispanics have been a demographic majority since 1980, and have grown quickly. As of the 2000 Census, Dover's population was 57.9% Hispanic, making it the municipality with the fifth-highest Hispanic population percentage in New Jersey and one of eight New Jersey municipalities with a Hispanic majority. The surrounding Morris County area is predominantly non-Hispanic (7.8% Hispanic or Latino, of any race).

== Points of interest ==
- The Baker's Opera House is a historic theatre located on Blackwell Street and listed on the National Register of Historic Places (NRHP).
- The Dover station is a historic train station listed on the NRHP.
- The Blackwell Street Historic District, listed on the NRHP, contains 52 contributing buildings.
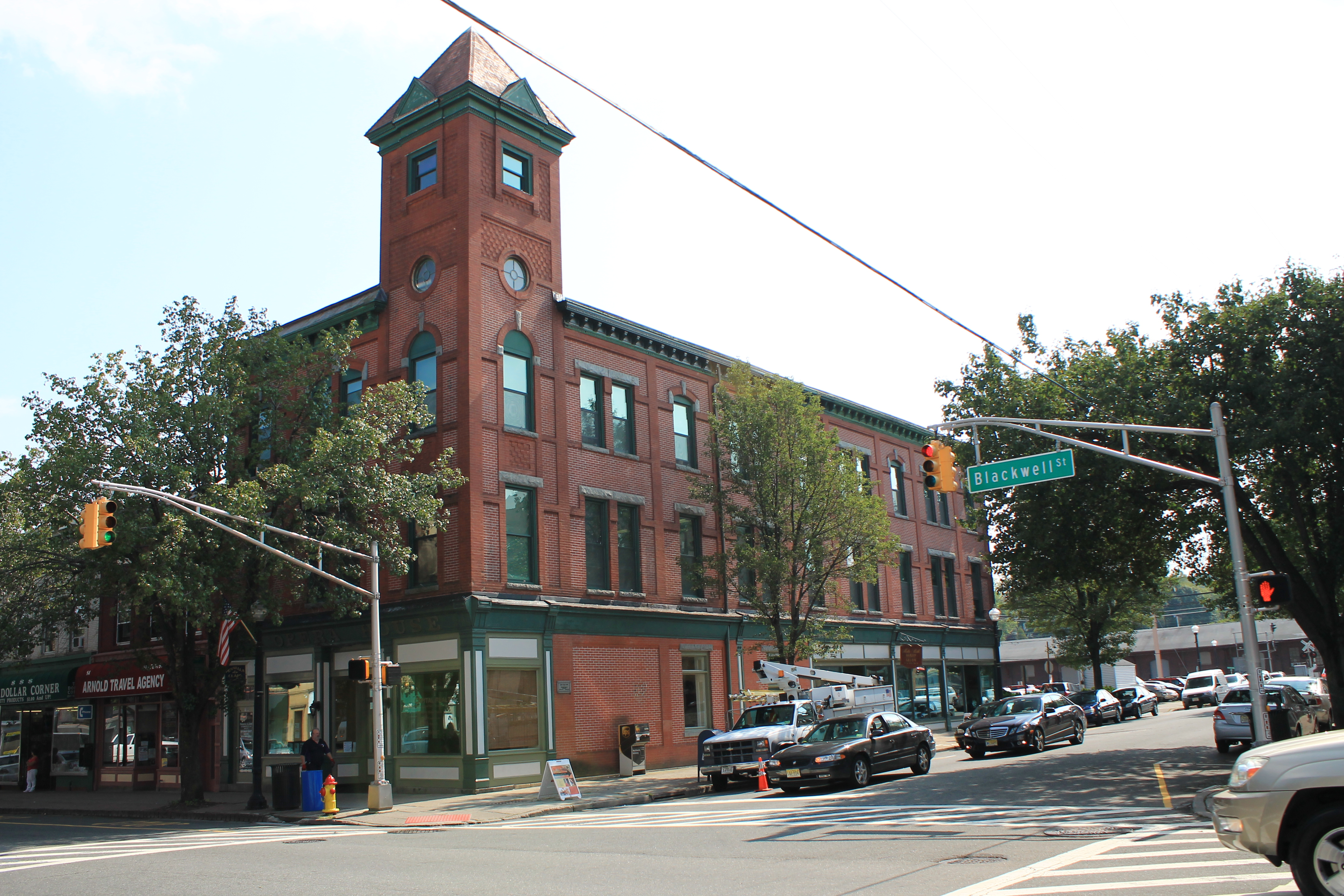
Baker's Opera House

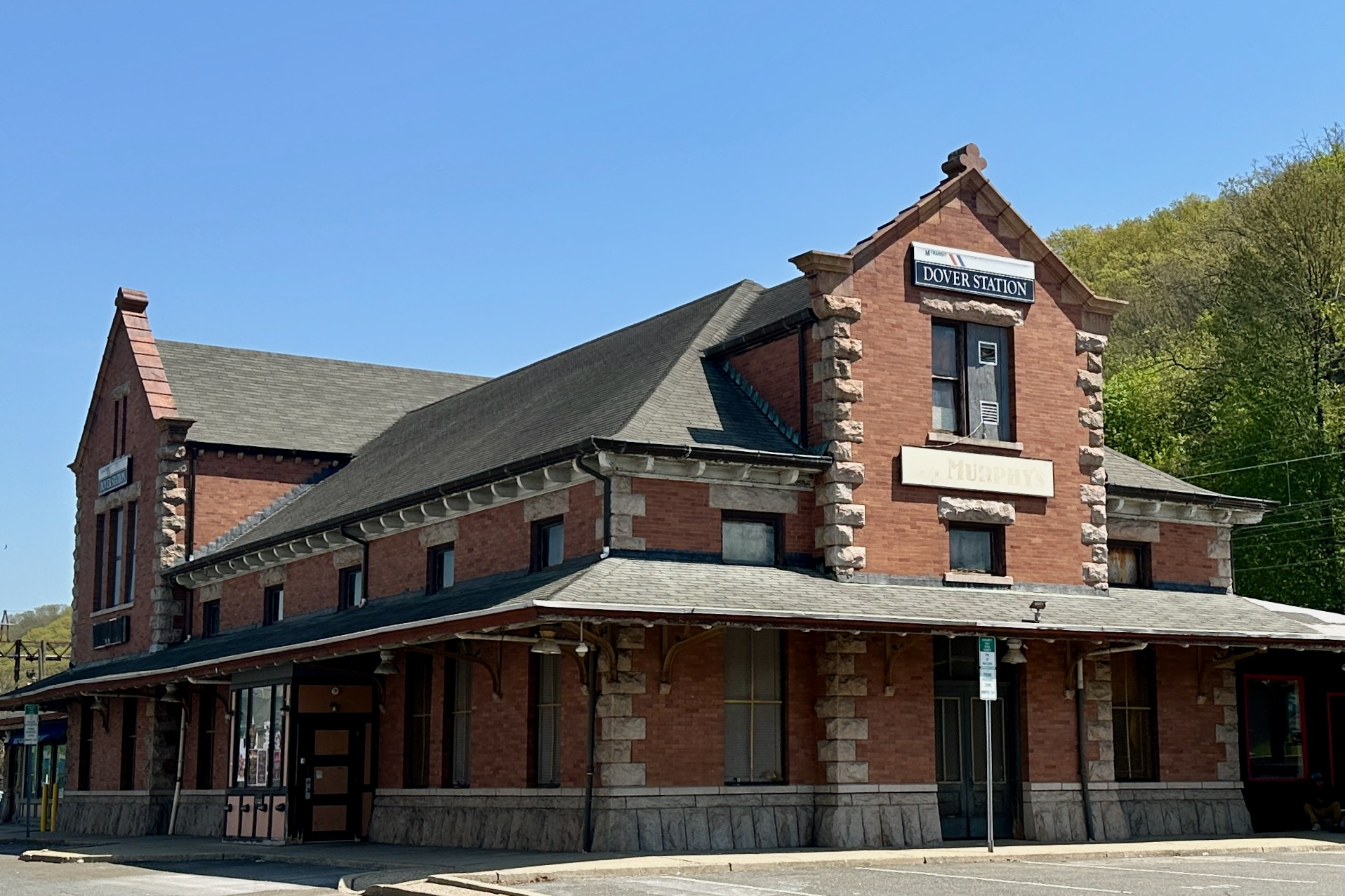
Dover station

== Parks and recreation ==
- Hedden County Park, on Reservoir Avenue, is a 380-acre (1.5 km^{2}) Morris County park, is partly located in Dover, with park entrances in Randolph. An active park, mostly in Randolph Township, with a picnic pavilion and tables, stone cooking grills for picnics in the woods, paddle boats in season, playgrounds, ball fields and hiking trails.
- Hamilton Field is one of Dover's recreation centers, featuring a football field with bleachers, soccer fields, and a historic cinder track. This facility is restricted to school use and is not open to the public.
- JFK Memorial Commons Park consists of a children's play park and the town Gazebo. JFK Park hosts the town's annual Christmas tree lighting, Easter egg hunt, Halloween parade, summer concerts and on occasions ceremonies following town parades. The park was constructed by filling in the basin for the old Morris Canal. The name was given following the assassination of President Kennedy in 1963.
- Crescent Field includes a new turf soccer field and is the hosting site for Dover's annual Colombian Festival.
- Water Works Park consists of a baseball field, picnic area, and accessible banks of the Rockaway River. The Water Commission purchased the lane in 1902 and developed wells for much needed water to a growing community. In 1933, the land became a playground for picnicking and swimming in the nearby Rockaway River.
- Hurd Park is a passive park with no playgrounds or ballfields. Ideal location for wedding and graduation photographs with its Greek style pavilion having fluted columns and a circular gazebo-like center with a red-tiled roof and a scenic background. Donated to the town in 1911 by John Hurd, the park is also host to a 1922 World War I Spirit of the American Doughboy statue, one of a few found around the country. The park also displays a Civil War Memorial, a Spanish American War Memorial and a brick-walk memorial naming those on stone bricks who served in the Armed Forces. The park is also adjacent to Indian Falls, a scenic walk along the Jackson Brook to Hedden Park.
- Triangle Park. In downtown Dover at the foot of Prospect Street, the small park is maintained by Dover's Renaissance Club and the home of Hudson Favell's "Story Poles."
- Hooey Park is a small neighborhood park with a climbing playground for kids located in the Salem Village section of town.
- Richards Avenue Park is a small park built on a vacant lot consisting of a small climbing playground for kids.
- Bowlby Park and King Field located in North Dover was developed for Little League Baseball, soccer and high school girls softball games.
- Mountain Park is located in South Dover on the old Munson Mine Tract and is being developed for hiking trails.

== Government ==
=== Local government ===
Dover operates using the Town form of government, one of nine municipalities (of the 564) statewide that use this form of government. The governing body is composed of the Mayor and the Town Council who are chosen on a partisan basis as part of the November general election. The Mayor is elected at-large to a four-year term of office. The Towns Council is comprised of eight members, with two council members elected to two-year terms from each of the four wards on a staggered basis, with one seat coming up for election each year in each ward. The governing body had been known as the Board of Aldermen until October 2023, when the name was changed to the Town Council, making it the last municipality in the state to have used the term Aldermen.

As of 2026, the Mayor of Dover is Democrat James P. Dodd, whose term of office ends on December 31, 2027. Dodd had previously served as Mayor from 2006-2019 and defeated incumbent Mayor Carolyn Blackman in the 2023 Democratic primary en route to returning to office. Members of the Town Council are Christopher Almada (Ward 3; D, 2027), Geovani Estacio-Carillo (Ward 2; D, 2026), Daniella Mendez (Ward 1; D, 2027), Judith Rugg (Ward 2; D, 2027), Arturo "A.B." Santana (Ward 4; D, 2027), Marcos Tapia-Aguilar, Sr. (Ward 4; D, 2026), and Sandra Wittner (Ward 1; D, 2026).

Dover serves as the lead agency operating a joint municipal court that also serves the neighboring municipalities of Mine Hill Township, Mount Arlington, Victory Gardens and Wharton. Established in 2009, the joint municipal court was projected to offer annual savings in excess of $250,000 over the 10-year life of the agreement.

=== Federal, state, and county representation ===
Dover is located in the 11th Congressional District and is part of New Jersey's 25th state legislative district.

Prior to the 2010 Census, Dover had been part of the 11th Congressional District, a change made by the New Jersey Redistricting Commission that took effect in January 2013, based on the results of the November 2012 general elections.

For the 119th United States Congress, New Jersey's 11th congressional district is represented by Analilia Mejia (D, Glen Ridge) who was elected in a 2026 special election to serve for the remainder of the Congress following the resignation Mikie Sherrill (D, Montclair), who was elected Governor of New Jersey in 2025. New Jersey is represented in the United States Senate by Democrats Cory Booker (Newark, term ends 2027) and Andy Kim (Moorestown, term ends 2031).

For the 2026–2027 session, the 25th legislative district of the New Jersey Legislature is represented in the State Senate by Anthony M. Bucco (R, Boonton Township) and in the General Assembly by Aura K. Dunn (R, Mendham Borough) and Marisa Sweeney (D, Morristown).

Morris County is governed by a Board of County Commissioners comprised of seven members who are elected at-large in partisan elections to three-year terms on a staggered basis, with either one or three seats up for election each year as part of the November general election. Actual day-to-day operation of departments is supervised by County Administrator Deena Leary.

As of 2026, Morris County's Commissioners (with all terms ending December 31) are Director Stephen H. Shaw (R, Mountain Lakes, 2027), Deputy Director John Krickus (R, Washington Township, 2027), Douglas Cabana (R, Boonton Township, 2028), Thomas J. Mastrangelo (R, Montville, 2028), Christine Myers (R, Harding Township, 2028), Tayfun Selen (R, Chatham Township, 2026), and Deborah Smith (R, Denville Township, 2027).

The county's constitutional officers are County Clerk Ann F. Grossi (R, Parsippany–Troy Hills, 2028), Sheriff James M. Gannon (R, Boonton Township, 2025) and Surrogate Heather Darling (R, Roxbury, 2029).

=== Politics ===
United States presidential election results for Dover 2024 2020 2016 2012 2008 2004
Year	Republican		Democratic		Third party(ies)	
Year	No.	%	No.	%	No.	%
2024	2,188	42.13%	2,891	55.66%	115	2.21%
2020	1,809	32.01%	3,786	66.99%	57	1.01%
2016	1,294	25.94%	3,539	70.94%	156	3.13%
2012	1,195	26.84%	3,223	72.38%	35	0.79%
2008	1,500	31.89%	3,172	67.45%	31	0.66%
2004	1,914	41.55%	2,658	57.71%	34	0.74%

As of March 2011, there were a total of 6,613 registered voters in Dover. Of those, 2,603 (39.4%) were registered as Democrats, 1,125 (17.0%) were registered as Republicans, 2,881 (43.6%) were registered as Unaffiliated, and 4 were registered as Libertarians or Greens.

In the 2012 presidential election, Democrat Barack Obama received 72.4% of the vote (3,223 cast), ahead of Republican Mitt Romney with 26.8% (1,195 votes), and other candidates with 0.8% (35 votes), among the 4,494 ballots cast by the town's 7,196 registered voters (41 ballots were spoiled), for a turnout of 62.5%. In the 2008 presidential election, Democrat Barack Obama received 67.1% of the vote (3,172 cast), ahead of Republican John McCain with 31.7% (1,500 votes) and other candidates with 0.7% (31 votes), among the 4,727 ballots cast by the town's 7,019 registered voters, for a turnout of 67.3%. In the 2004 presidential election, Democrat John Kerry received 57.2% of the vote (2,658 ballots cast), outpolling Republican George W. Bush with 41.2% (1,914 votes) and other candidates with 0.5% (34 votes), among the 4,643 ballots cast by the town's 7,356 registered voters, for a turnout percentage of 63.1.

Gubernatorial election results for Dover
Year	Republican		Democratic		Third party(ies)	
Year	No.	%	No.	%	No.	%
2025	1,161	30.33%	2,635	68.83%	32	0.84%
2021	907	34.32%	1,715	64.89%	21	0.79%
2017	719	29.74%	1,640	67.82%	59	2.44%
2013	1,055	53.96%	853	43.63%	47	2.40%
2009	919	36.91%	1,408	56.55%	163	6.55%
2005	1,019	35.53%	1,742	60.74%	107	3.73%

In the 2013 gubernatorial election, Republican Chris Christie received 54.0% of the vote (1,055 cast), ahead of Democrat Barbara Buono with 43.6% (853 votes), and other candidates with 2.4% (47 votes), among the 1,994 ballots cast by the town's 7,078 registered voters (39 ballots were spoiled), for a turnout of 28.2%. In the 2009 gubernatorial election, Democrat Jon Corzine received 55.6% of the vote (1,408 ballots cast), ahead of Republican Chris Christie with 36.3% (919 votes), Independent Chris Daggett with 5.6% (142 votes) and other candidates with 0.8% (21 votes), among the 2,532 ballots cast by the town's 6,750 registered voters, yielding a 37.5% turnout.

United States Senate election results for Dover1
Year	Republican		Democratic		Third party(ies)	
Year	No.	%	No.	%	No.	%
2024	1,610	36.92%	2,594	59.48%	157	3.60%
2018	1,019	26.50%	2,685	69.83%	141	3.67%
2012	985	24.38%	3,000	74.26%	55	1.36%
2006	998	34.93%	1,803	63.11%	56	1.96%

United States Senate election results for Dover2
Year	Republican		Democratic		Third party(ies)	
Year	No.	%	No.	%	No.	%
2020	1,465	27.56%	3,750	70.56%	100	1.88%
2014	579	33.76%	1,105	64.43%	31	1.81%
2013	480	37.62%	787	61.68%	9	0.71%
2008	1,214	30.67%	2,642	66.75%	102	2.58%

== Education ==
The Dover School District serves students in pre-kindergarten through twelfth grade. As of the 2021–22 school year, the district, comprised of five schools, had an enrollment of 3,448 students and 244.6 classroom teachers (on an FTE basis), for a student–teacher ratio of 14.1:1. Schools in the district (with 2021–22 enrollment from the National Center for Education Statistics) are Academy Street Elementary School with 470 students in grades K-6, East Dover Elementary School with 389 students in grades K-6, North Dover Elementary School with 658 students in grades PreK-6, Dover Middle School with 524 students in grades 7-8 and Dover High School with 1,094 students in grades 9-12.

The district serves students from Victory Gardens, which has been fully consolidated into the Dover School District since 2010. Students in grades 7–12 from Mine Hill Township attend the district's schools as part of a sending/receiving relationship.

Sacred Heart School was a Catholic school serving students in pre-school through eighth grade that operated under the auspices of the Roman Catholic Diocese of Paterson. A successful fundraising effort in 2006 had kept the school open despite plans to close the school, but in 2009 the Paterson Diocese announced that declining enrollment and financial difficulties would lead to the school's closure at the conclusion of the 2008–2009 school year.

The Joe Kubert School of Cartoon and Graphic Art, a technical school founded in 1976 by cartoonist Joe Kubert and his wife Muriel and the only accredited school devoted to cartooning and graphic art, is located in Dover.

== Infrastructure ==
=== Transportation ===
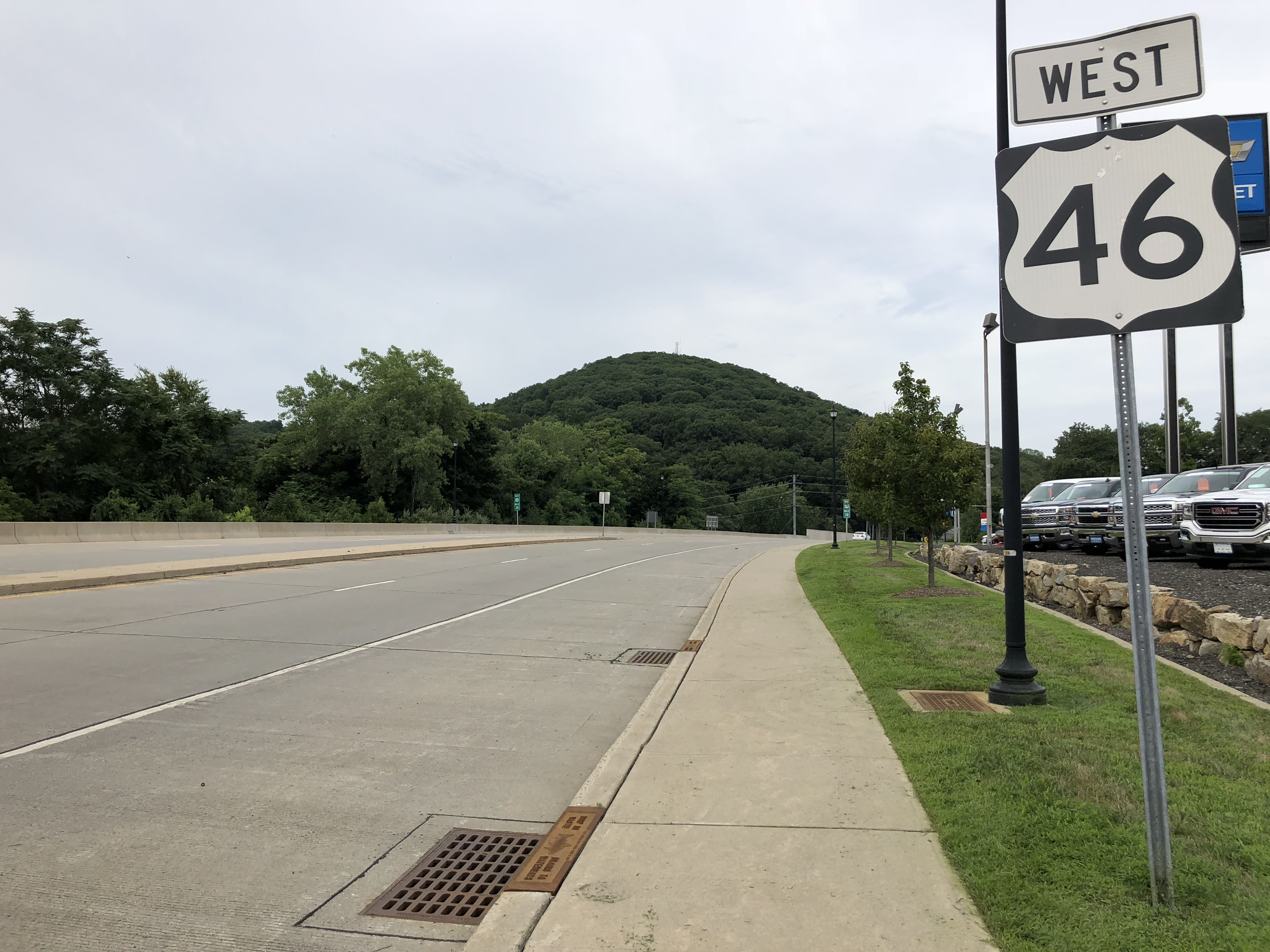
U.S. Route 46 westbound in Dover

==== Roads and highways ====
As of May 2010, the town had a total of 42.84 miles (68.94 km) of roadways, of which 34.39 miles (55.35 km) were maintained by the municipality, 4.85 miles (7.81 km) by Morris County and 3.60 miles (5.79 km) by the New Jersey Department of Transportation.

Highways directly serving Dover include U.S. Route 46, New Jersey Route 15 and County Route 513. Interstate 80 is accessible from several neighboring towns.

==== Public transportation ====
Dover is served by NJ Transit bus routes 875 and 880, replacing service on the MCM2, MCM5, MCM7 and MCM10 routes until June 2010, when NJ Transit eliminated the subsidy as part of budget cuts.

NJ Transit Morristown Line and Montclair-Boonton Line trains stop at the Dover station. Trains operate to Hackettstown, Netcong, Boonton, Morristown, Montclair State University, Summit, the Oranges, Newark, Hoboken, New York City, and intermediate points.

Lakeland Bus Lines provides regular service to Sparta, Newton, Mount Olive, Rockaway, Boonton, Parsippany, Wayne, New York City, and intermediate points from their terminal on the Rockaway Township border. Service is also provided from Wednesday to Sunday between Dover and Atlantic City

The Morris County Department of Transportation also operates bus service along Route 46 to Netcong and Mount Olive Township.

==== Air ====
Dover is located approximately 15 minutes west of Morristown Municipal Airport, and approximately 40 minutes west of Newark Liberty International Airport in Newark / Elizabeth.

=== Health care ===
Dover is served by St. Clare's Dover General Hospital, located on Route 46, which is the local medical facility for Dover and other communities in western Morris County. Saint Clare's Denville Hospital is located 5 miles (8.0 km) east of Dover in Denville, and Morristown Medical Center is located 11 miles (18 km) east of Dover in Morristown. The Zufall Health Center, founded in 1990, is located on Warren Street and provides basic medical and dental services to low-income residents of Dover and neighboring communities.

== Community ==
The community of Dover is centered around a developed downtown area around Blackwell Street, featuring many eateries primarily owned and run by Hispanics of various countries, offering their ethnic food. Other culinary establishments include sushi, pizza, coffee shops, and popular Irish and Italian food.

Dover has been described as a walking town, as most parts of town are within about a 1/2 mile of the downtown area and most streets have sidewalks.

== Popular culture ==
- The climactic scene of the 2008 movie, The Wrestler, was filmed at the Baker Theater.
- Metallica played their first ever New Jersey show at Showplace in Dover on April 16, 1983. It was also the first time the band performed live with lead guitarist Kirk Hammett.
- The music video for Eddie Money's "I Wanna Go Back" was filmed on Blackwell Street and at the old Dover High School, Dover Middle School, and now Joe Kubert School of Cartoon and Graphic Art.
- Dover is referenced multiple times in The Sopranos. In season 2, episode 4 ("Commendatori"), Elvis impersonator/DiMeo crime family associate, Jimmy Bones, tells Big Pussy Bonpensiero and Agent Skip Lipari that he was born and raised in Dover, New Jersey and emphasizes that the town was named after the Cliffs of Dover. In episode 5 of season 5 ("Irregular Around the Margins"), Tony Soprano and Adriana La Cerva get into a car accident in Dover, where they were going to buy cocaine.
- Dover was featured on episode 25 of season 6 of Impractical Jokers titled "Dover and Out" in which Brian "Q" Quinn, a member of the comedy troupe The Tenderloins, pretends to be an artist and reveals a mural stating "Dover sucks" to the town's government and residents.

== Notable people ==
People who were born in, residents of, or otherwise closely associated with Dover include:

- Lois Barker (1923–2018), All-American Girls Professional Baseball League player
- William F. Birch (1870–1946), represented New Jersey's 5th congressional district
- Harry "A" Chesler (1897/98–1981), comic book entrepreneur
- Shane Davis, comic book artist
- Jim Duffy (born 1974), baseball coach who was head coach of the Manhattan Jaspers baseball team from 2012 through 2017
- George Peter Foster (1858–1928), U.S. Representative from Illinois who served from 1899 to 1905
- Thomas Jefferson Halsey (1863–1951), Congressman who represented Missouri's 6th congressional district from 1929 to 1931
- Ken Jones (1903–1991), MLB pitcher
- Paula Kassell (1917–2012), founder of New Directions for Women who successfully pushed The New York Times to use the term "Ms." in reference to women
- Joseph Kekuku (1874–1932), inventor of the steel guitar
- X. J. Kennedy (born 1929), writer and poet
- Adam Kubert (born 1959), cartoonist and instructor at The Kubert School
- Andy Kubert (born 1962), cartoonist and instructor at The Kubert School
- Joe Kubert (1926–2012), cartoonist and founder of The Kubert School
- Mike Leach (born 1976), former NFL long snapper
- Ben Loory (born 1971), author
- Stuart Loory (1932–2015), journalist and educator
- Jacque MacKinnon (1938–1975), tight end who played for the San Diego Chargers
- Drew Miller (born 1984), left wing who has played for the Detroit Red Wings
- Sidney Mintz (1922–2015), anthropologist best known for his studies of the Caribbean, creolization and the anthropology of food
- Harry J. Palmer (1872–1948), politician who served in the New York State Senate
- PES (born 1973 as Adam Pesapane), Oscar and Emmy-nominated director and stop-motion animator, whose short film Fresh Guacamole was nominated for the Academy Award for Best Animated Short Film in 2013
- Reince Priebus (born 1972), former chairman of the Republican National Committee
- Sherry Ross (born c. 1954), sports broadcaster and journalist who is a color commentator for the New Jersey Devils radio broadcasts
- Brandon Sklenar (born 1990), actor best known for his roles in the films Mapplethorpe, Vice, Midway and It Ends with Us
- Gail Sontgerath (born 1944), gymnast who competed in six events at the 1960 Summer Olympics
- Edgar Tillyer (1881–1970), astronomer, computer and lens designer who was the director of research at the American Optical Company
- Jyles Tucker (born 1983), linebacker for the San Diego Chargers
- Shirley Turner (born 1941), politician who represents the 15th Legislative District in the New Jersey Senate
- Bruce Waibel (1958–2003), bass guitarist who toured with FireHouse
- Ava Ziegler (born 2006), figure skater who won the 2022 CS Budapest Trophy
