= Hedden County Park =

Public park in New Jersey, United States

Coordinates: 40.878°N 74.576°W

Hedden County Park is a general purpose public park, located in Morris County, New Jersey, near the town of Dover. It has a total area of 389.42 acres (1.5759 km^{2}) which includes six-acre Hedden Pond and a 2.8-acre easement along Jackson Brook. The park was dedicated on October 4, 1970, and is named after the Hedden family of Dover, who donated the original 40 acres (160,000 m^{2}) section in 1963.

The park features two ball fields, and other multiple-purpose fields, and a children play area. There are picnic areas, including a 140-person sheltered area with facilities. The pond offers a fishing deck. Most of the park area is accessible from several hiking trails through woods and along streams and waterfalls.
