= New Directions for Women =

- Type: Quarterly newspaper
- Format: Tabloid
- Editor: Paula Kassell
- Founded: January 1972
- Ceased publication: 1993
- Headquarters: Dover, New Jersey
- Website: https://voices.revealdigital.com/cgi-bin/independentvoices?a=cl&cl=CL1&sp=DGBHBCA&ai=1&e=-------en-20--1--txt-txIN---------------1

New Directions for Women was an important early feminist newspaper. It began as a mimeographed newsletter in 1972 in New Jersey, but soon expanded into a tabloid-sized quarterly newspaper. Edited by Paula Kassell of Dover, a member of the Morristown chapter of National Organization for Women (NOW), the paper offered news reports from a feminist perspective as well as book reviews, women's history articles, and editorials, and was the first national feminist newspaper in the United States. After years of struggling to attain financial stability, the newspaper discontinued publishing in 1993.
