= Baker Building =

- U.S. National Register of Historic Places
- New Jersey Register of Historic Places
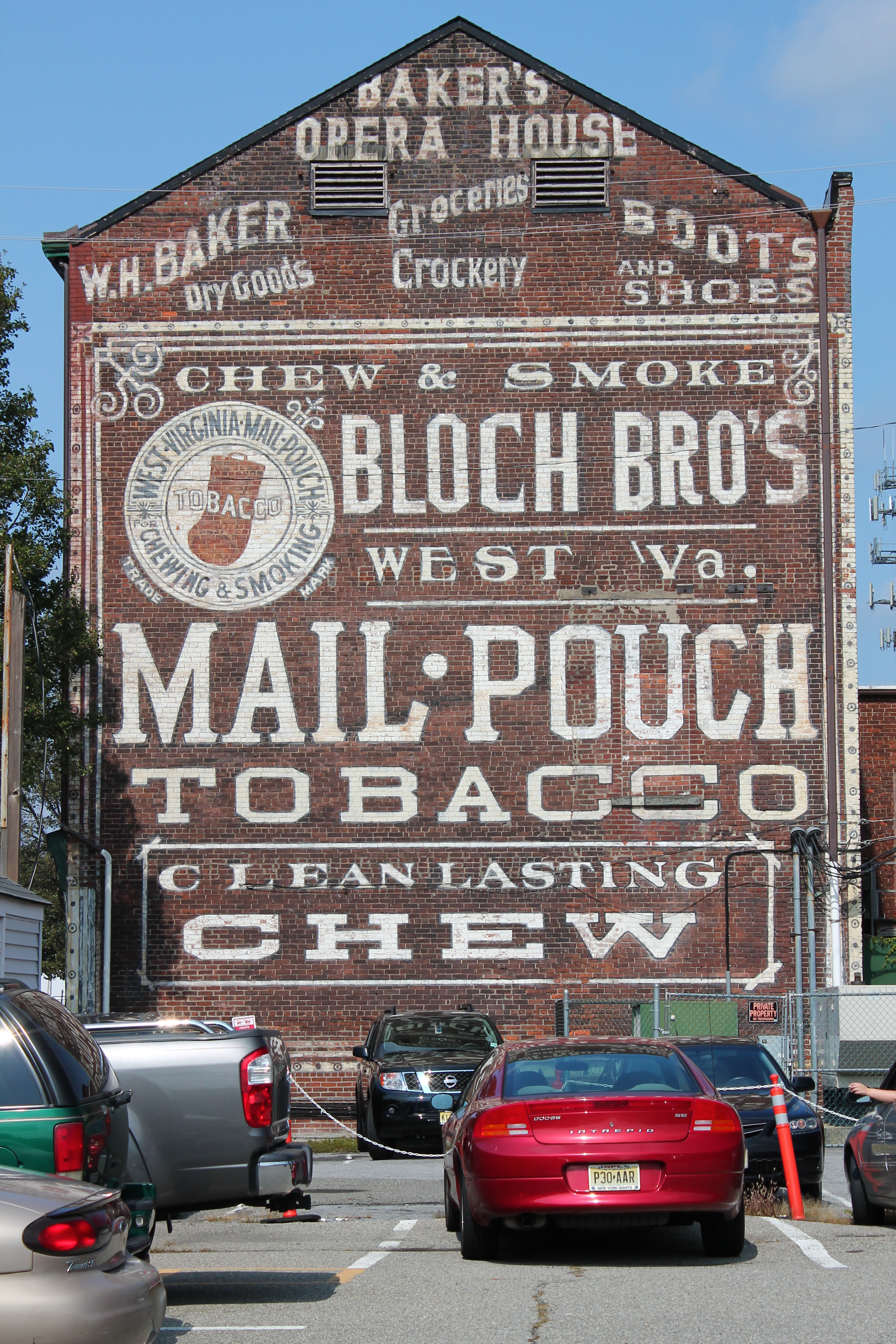
- Rear of the building

- Location within Morris County, New Jersey Location within New Jersey Location within the United States
- Location: 16 W. Blackwell Street, Dover, New Jersey
- Coordinates: 40°53′2″N 74°33′33″W
- Built: 1884
- NRHP reference No.: 81000396
- NJRHP No.: 2107

Significant dates
- Added to NRHP: July 1, 1981
- Designated NJRHP: May 22, 1981

The Baker Building, also known as Baker's Opera House, in Dover, Morris County, New Jersey, United States, is a historic theater built of brick in the mid-1880s. Built in the Eclectic style, it has three stories plus a tower. On the north side facing Blackwell Street, there are recessed brick panels, granite lintels and window sills, and a granite panel reading "Baker Building." A Mail Pouch Tobacco sign covers the south side of the building.

The "Opera House" was built by William Henry Baker as a vaudeville theater. The grand opening was on April 5, 1886, with the Alfa Norman English Opera Company performing The Bobetuian Girl. On April 6 the same company performed The Mikado. Tickets cost $1.00 to $1.50. Later fare included other Gilbert and Sullivan comic operas, magic shows and minstrel shows featuring Arthur Deming. In 1906 the theater was thoroughly reconstructed and started showing silent films along with vaudeville performances after it reopened on December 5, 1906.

The renovation cost $75,000 and included many plaster ornaments and friezes. Movies started at 7 P.M. with five vaudeville acts started at 8 P.M. with both shows accompanied by a seven piece orchestra. After W. H. Baker died in 1910 his son Henry O. Baker took over the business closing it for another reconstruction and fireproofing in 1924. It reopened with 1,600 seats on December 22, 1924. Stanley Fabian later took over the theater, which showed its first talking picture, On Trial on March 18, 1929.

Stars who have visited the theater or appeared on the stage include Al St. John, Buster Keaton, Pearl White, DeWolf Hopper, Helen Hayes, Lillian Russell, Ethel Barrymore and Abbott and Costello.

The building was nearly demolished in 1977 before its purchase by the Morris County Trust for Historic Preservation. It was then listed on the New Jersey registry of historic sites and in 1981 on the National Register of Historic Places for its significance in architecture, commerce, and theater.
