= 2025–26 Saint Francis Red Flash men's basketball team =

American college basketball season

2025–26 Saint Francis Red Flash men's basketball
- Conference: Northeast Conference
- Record: 7–24 (5–13 NEC)
- Head coach: Luke McConnell (1st season)
- Associate head coach: Devin Sweetney
- Assistant coaches: Tanner Massey; Kyle Polce
- Home arena: DeGol Arena

2025–26 NEC men's basketball standings
	Conf.				Overall
Team	W		L	PCT	W		L	PCT
LIU †	15	–	3	.833	24	–	11	.686
Central Connecticut	12	–	6	.667	18	–	12	.600
Mercyhurst *	10	–	8	.556	17	–	17	.500
Le Moyne *	10	–	8	.556	15	–	17	.469
New Haven **	9	–	9	.500	14	–	17	.452
Stonehill	8	–	10	.444	12	–	21	.364
Fairleigh Dickinson	8	–	10	.444	11	–	21	.344
Wagner	8	–	10	.444	14	–	17	.452
Chicago State	5	–	13	.278	7	–	25	.219
Saint Francis	5	–	13	.278	7	–	24	.226
† 2026 NEC tournament winner * ineligible for the 2026 NCAA tournament due to transition from Division II ** ineligible for both the 2026 NEC tournament and the 2026 NCAA tournament due to transition from Division II

The 2025–26 Saint Francis Red Flash men's basketball team represented Saint Francis University during the 2025–26 NCAA Division I men's basketball season. The Red Flash, led by first-year head coach Luke McConnell, played their home games at the DeGol Arena in Loretto, Pennsylvania in their final season as members of the Northeast Conference.

This season was Saint Francis' last as an NCAA Division I member, as on March 25, 2025, the school announced that it would start reclassification to NCAA Division III in July of 2026, joining the Presidents' Athletic Conference.

Eight of the conference's ten teams would qualify for the tournament. New Haven is ineligible for the tournament due to their transition from Division II. The Red Flash finished 5–13 and in tenth (last) place in the conference standings. Thus, they finished off their final Division I season by missing the NEC tournament and in turn being eliminated from making the NCAA Division I men's basketball tournament.

== Previous season ==
The Red Flash finished the 2024–25 season 16–18, 8–8 in NEC play, to finish in a tie for fourth place. They defeated Wagner, LIU, and upset top-seeded Central Connecticut in the NEC tournament championship game, earning the Red Flash just their second ever NCAA tournament appearance, and their first since 1991. In the NCAA tournament, they would receive the #16 seed in the South Region, where they would be defeated by fellow #16 seed Alabama State in the First Four.

Shortly after their aforementioned move to DIII, head coach Rob Krimmel announced that he would be retiring from coaching after 13 seasons with the team, with associate head coach Luke McConnell being named Krimmel's successor.

== Preseason ==
On October 27, 2025, the NEC released their preseason coaches poll. Saint Francis was picked to finish seventh in the conference.

=== Preseason rankings ===
NEC Preseason Poll
Place	Team
1	LIU*
2	Central Connecticut
3	Stonehill
4	Mercyhurst
5	Fairleigh Dickinson
6	Chicago State
7	Saint Francis
8	Wagner
9	Le Moyne
10	New Haven
(*) Unanimous selection

=== Preseason All-NEC Team ===
No players were named to the All-NEC Preseason Team.

== Roster ==
2025–26 Saint Francis Red Flash men's basketball team
Players
Coaches

Pos.	#	Name	Height	Weight	Year	Previous school	Hometown
G	0	Chris Moncrief	6 ft 6 in (1.98 m)	190 lb (86 kg)	Sr	Evansville	Turtle Creek, Pennsylvania
G	1	KJ Swain Jr.	6 ft 1 in (1.85 m)	165 lb (75 kg)	RS Sr	Cincinnati Christian Schools	Hamilton, Ohio
G	2	Zion Russell	6 ft 2 in (1.88 m)	185 lb (84 kg)	RS Sr	Niagara	Upper Marlboro, Maryland
G	3	Brandon Russell	6 ft 5 in (1.96 m)	185 lb (84 kg)	Fr	Archbishop Ryan High School	Hamilton, New Jersey
G/F	4	Ralph Martino Jr.	6 ft 6 in (1.98 m)	180 lb (82 kg)	So	Maryland Eastern Shore	Lanham, Maryland
G	7	Paris Papadatos	6 ft 4 in (1.93 m)	188 lb (85 kg)	Fr	St. Thomas Aquinas High School	Alimos, Greece
G/F	8	Skylar Wicks	6 ft 6 in (1.98 m)	190 lb (86 kg)	RS Sr	UTSA	Jersey City, New Jersey
G	11	Melvin Weaver III	6 ft 3 in (1.91 m)	195 lb (88 kg)	So	Hampton	Unionville, Connecticut
F	13	Kam Wylie	6 ft 8 in (2.03 m)	190 lb (86 kg)	Fr	Mt. Zion Preparatory Academy	Baltimore, Maryland
G	15	Victor Payne	6 ft 4 in (1.93 m)	190 lb (86 kg)	So	Cromwell High School	Cromwell, Connecticut
F	20	Cam Tweedy	6 ft 6 in (1.98 m)	240 lb (109 kg)	RS Sr	Fairleigh Dickinson	Waldorf, Maryland
F	21	Gestin Liberis	6 ft 9 in (2.06 m)	215 lb (98 kg)	RS Jr	George School	Havertown, Pennsylvania
G	22	Ryen Gresko	5 ft 11 in (1.8 m)	170 lb (77 kg)	Jr	Penns Manor High School	Penn Run, Pennsylvania
G	24	Carson Rhodes	6 ft 3 in (1.91 m)	180 lb (82 kg)	So	Hollidaysburg Area High School	Hollidaysburg, Pennsylvania
G	30	Trey Weiand	6 ft 4 in (1.93 m)	200 lb (91 kg)	Jr	Trinity High School	Mechanicsburg, Pennsylvania
C	32	Kofi Asare	6 ft 10 in (2.08 m)	240 lb (109 kg)	Fr	Orion International Academy	Bradwell, England
G	33	Brandon Rabish	6 ft 0 in (1.83 m)	150 lb (68 kg)	Fr	Penn Cambria High School	Cresson, Pennsylvania
G	55	Ahmad Harrison	6 ft 1 in (1.85 m)	190 lb (86 kg)	Sr	Notre Dame (MD)	Baltimore, Maryland

Head coach

- Luke McConnell (Saint Francis (PA))

Assistant coach(es)

- Devin Sweetney (Saint Francis (PA))
- Tanner Massey (Coastal Carolina)
- Kyle Polce (USC Beaufort)

Legend

- (C) Team captain
- (S) Suspended
- (I) Ineligible
- (W) Walk-on
- Injured
- Current redshirt

Roster
Last update: November 18, 2025

== Schedule and results ==
Date time, TV	Rank^{#}	Opponent^{#}	Result	Record	High points	High rebounds	High assists	Site (attendance) city, state
Non-conference regular season
November 3, 2025*; 8:30 pm, SECN+		at Oklahoma	L 66–102	0–1	20 – Wicks	5 – Tied	3 – Wicks	Lloyd Noble Center (6,476); Norman, OK
November 6, 2025*; 8:00 pm, TNT/TruTV		at TCU	L 63–104	0–2	18 – Wicks	6 – Wicks	5 – Liberis	Schollmaier Arena (4,432); Fort Worth, TX
November 11, 2025*; 7:00 pm, NECFR		Mount St. Mary's	L 66–74	0–3	23 – Russell	13 – Wicks	4 – Russell	DeGol Arena (827); Loretto, PA
November 18, 2025*; 7:00 pm, ESPN+		at Lehigh	L 62–79	0–4	24 – Wicks	12 – Wicks	5 – Russell	Stabler Arena (572); Bethlehem, PA
November 24, 2025*; 1:30 pm, FloCollege		vs. Belmont; Coconut Hoops Royal Palm Division	L 57–94	0–5	17 – Harrison	7 – Wicks	3 – Martino Jr.	Alico Arena (212); Fort Myers, FL
November 26, 2025*; 11:00 am, FloCollege		vs. Troy; Coconut Hoops Royal Palm Division	L 64–74	0–6	21 – Wicks	9 – Wicks	3 – Wicks	Alico Arena (101); Fort Myers, FL
November 29, 2025*; 2:00 pm, NECFR		Franciscan	W 85–60	1–6	16 – Liberis	10 – Liberis	6 – Harrison	DeGol Arena (384); Loretto, PA
December 1, 2025*; 7:00 pm, truTV		at Xavier	L 74–96	1–7	19 – Wicks	8 – Russell	6 – Wicks	Cintas Center (9,143); Cincinnati, OH
December 3, 2025*; 7:00 pm, NECFR		Penn State Shenango	W 100–41	2–7	19 – Papadatos	10 – Liberis	7 – Swain Jr.	DeGol Arena (665); Loretto, PA
December 7, 2025*; 2:30 pm, ESPN+		at Radford	L 56–89	2–8	15 – Papadatos	6 – Russell	2 – Tied	Dedmon Center (924); Radford, VA
December 14, 2025*; 12:00 pm, ESPN+		at Temple	L 67–95	2–9	22 – Wicks	6 – Tied	7 – Russell	Liacouras Center (2,043); Philadelphia, PA
December 17, 2025*; 6:30 pm, SECN		at No. 23 Florida	L 61–102	2–10	22 – Wicks	5 – Russell	3 – Russell	O'Connell Center (9,023); Gainesville, FL
December 20, 2025*; 1:00 pm, NECFR		Robert Morris	L 70–79	2–11	19 – Wicks	8 – Wicks	4 – Wicks	DeGol Arena (385); Loretto, PA
NEC regular season
January 2, 2026; 7:00 pm, NECFR		Le Moyne	L 58–84	2–12 (0–1)	12 – Russell	7 – Wicks	5 – Russell	DeGol Arena (375); Loretto, PA
January 4, 2026; 4:00 pm, NECFR		Fairleigh Dickinson	W 85–82	3–12 (1–1)	24 – Wicks	6 – Wicks	6 – Harrison	DeGol Arena (381); Loretto, PA
January 8, 2026; 7:00 pm, NECFR		at Wagner	W 71–69	4–12 (2–1)	16 – Harrison	9 – Wicks	7 – Wicks	Spiro Sports Center (689); Staten Island, NY
January 10, 2026; 2:00 pm, NECFR		at LIU	L 63–67	4–13 (2–2)	21 – Wicks	4 – Tied	3 – Russell	Steinberg Wellness Center (224); Brooklyn, NY
January 17, 2026; 2:00 pm, NECFR		Central Connecticut	L 90–98	4–14 (2–3)	17 – Harrison	9 – Liberis	7 – Harrison	DeGol Arena (768); Loretto, PA
January 19, 2026; 12:00 pm, NECFR		Stonehill	W 63–61	5–14 (3–3)	16 – Harrison	8 – Wicks	2 – Tied	DeGol Arena (674); Loretto, PA
January 23, 2026; 7:00 pm, NECFR		Chicago State	W 81–60	6–14 (4–3)	20 – Wicks	11 – Wicks	8 – Harrison	DeGol Arena (703); Loretto, PA
January 31, 2026; 7:00 pm, NECFR		New Haven	L 69–81	6–15 (4–4)	16 – Harrison	7 – Wicks	5 – Liberis	DeGol Arena (709); Loretto, PA
February 5, 2026; 7:00 pm, NECFR		at Mercyhurst	L 89–98	6–16 (4–5)	22 – Moncrief	7 – Wicks	6 – Tied	Owen McCormick Court (932); Erie, PA
February 7, 2026; 1:00 pm, NECFR		at Le Moyne	L 84–86	6–17 (4–6)	27 – Wicks	7 – Tied	5 – Moncrief	Ted Grant Court (586); DeWitt, NY
February 9, 2026 (Note: Originally scheduled for January 29); 3:00 pm, NECFR		at Chicago State	L 75–80	6–18 (4–7)	23 – Russell	11 – Tweedy	5 – Russell	Jones Convocation Center (27); Chicago, IL
February 12, 2026; 7:00 pm, NECFR		at Fairleigh Dickinson	L 59–66	6–19 (4–8)	14 – Moncrief	7 – Tied	3 – Harrison	Bogota Savings Bank Center (796); Hackensack, NJ
February 14, 2026; 2:00 pm, NECFR		Mercyhurst	L 79–94	6–20 (4–9)	33 – Wicks	5 – Wicks	5 – Wicks	DeGol Arena (910); Loretto, PA
February 19, 2026; 7:00 pm, NECFR		LIU	L 89–91	6–21 (4–10)	25 – Wicks	8 – Liberis	7 – Russell	DeGol Arena (771); Loretto, PA
February 21, 2026; 2:00 pm, NECFR		Wagner	L 56–65	6–22 (4–11)	21 – Russell	6 – Russell	5 – Harrison	DeGol Arena (1,068); Loretto, PA
February 24, 2026 (Note: Originally scheduled for January 25); 6:00 pm, NECFR		at New Haven	W 73–67	7–22 (5–11)	19 – Liberis	9 – Liberis	3 – Russell	Hazell Center (50); West Haven, CT
February 26, 2026; 7:00 pm, NECFR		at Stonehill	L 77–103	7–23 (5–12)	22 – Wicks	6 – Liberis	4 – Wicks	Merkert Gymnasium (307); Easton, MA
February 28, 2026; 1:00 pm, NECFR		at Central Connecticut	L 64–69	7–24 (5–13)	16 – Moncrief	11 – Liberis	6 – Wicks	William H. Detrick Gymnasium (1,018); New Britain, CT
*Non-conference game. ^{#}Rankings from AP Poll. (#) Tournament seedings in parentheses. All times are in Eastern.
