= 2025–26 New Haven Chargers men's basketball team =

American college basketball season

2025–26 New Haven Chargers men's basketball
- Conference: Northeast Conference
- Record: 14–17 (9–9 NEC)
- Head coach: Ted Hotaling (15th season)
- Associate head coach: Rob DePersia
- Assistant coaches: Spencer Jenney; Trayon Rumley
- Home arena: Hazell Center

2025–26 NEC men's basketball standings
	Conf.				Overall
Team	W		L	PCT	W		L	PCT
LIU	15	–	3	.833	21	–	10	.677
Central Connecticut	12	–	6	.667	18	–	11	.621
Mercyhurst *	10	–	8	.556	15	–	16	.484
Le Moyne *	10	–	8	.556	15	–	16	.484
New Haven **	9	–	9	.500	14	–	17	.452
Stonehill	8	–	10	.444	11	–	20	.355
Fairleigh Dickinson	8	–	10	.444	11	–	20	.355
Wagner	8	–	10	.444	13	–	16	.448
Chicago State	5	–	13	.278	7	–	24	.226
Saint Francis	5	–	13	.278	7	–	24	.226
† 2026 NEC tournament winner * ineligible for the 2026 NCAA tournament due to transition from Division II ** ineligible for both the 2026 NEC tournament and the 2026 NCAA tournament due to transition from Division II; As of February 28, 2026

The 2025–26 New Haven Chargers men's basketball team represented the University of New Haven during the 2025–26 NCAA Division I men's basketball season. The Chargers, led by 15th-year head coach Ted Hotaling, played their home games at the Hazell Center in West Haven, Connecticut as first-year members of the Northeast Conference (NEC).

This season marked New Haven's first year of a three-year transition period from Division II to Division I. As a result, the Chargers are currently not eligible to participate in the NCAA tournament until the 2028–29 season, at the earliest.

== Previous season ==
The Chargers finished the 2024–25 season 12–17, 7–13 in NE10 play, to finish in eighth place. They were defeated by Saint Michael's in the opening round of the NE10 tournament.

== Preseason ==
On October 27, 2025, the NEC released their preseason coaches poll. New Haven was picked to finish last in the conference.

=== Preseason rankings ===
NEC Preseason Poll
Place	Team
1	LIU*
2	Central Connecticut
3	Stonehill
4	Mercyhurst
5	Fairleigh Dickinson
6	Chicago State
7	Saint Francis
8	Wagner
9	Le Moyne
10	New Haven
(*) Unanimous selection

=== Preseason All-NEC Team ===
No players were named to the All-NEC Preseason Team.

== Roster ==
2025–26 New Haven Chargers men's basketball team
Players
Coaches

Pos.	#	Name	Height	Weight	Year	Previous school	Hometown
G	1	Jabri Fitzpatrick	6 ft 2 in (1.88 m)	170 lb (77 kg)	Jr	Felician	North Brunswick, New Jersey
G	2	Aidan Losiewicz	6 ft 3 in (1.91 m)	—	Fr	The Newman School	Douglas, Massachusetts
G	3	Kheni Briggs	6 ft 3 in (1.91 m)	200 lb (91 kg)	Sr	Albany	Kannapolis, North Carolina
G	4	Dominick LaDuca	5 ft 7 in (1.7 m)	—	Fr	Putnam Science Academy	East Hartford, Connecticut
F	5	Stefano Faloppa	6 ft 9 in (2.06 m)	235 lb (107 kg)	Jr	UT Martin	Portogruaro, Italy
G	6	Justice Hanna	6 ft 0 in (1.83 m)	—	Fr	Kingswood Oxford School	Meriden, Connecticut
G	7	Dior Kennedy	6 ft 2 in (1.88 m)	—	Fr	Hargrave Military Academy	Coatesville, Pennsylvania
G	8	Jagger Bascombe	6 ft 4 in (1.93 m)	175 lb (79 kg)	So	Marist	Franklin Square, New York
G	9	Owen Hotaling	6 ft 3 in (1.91 m)	—	Fr	Sheehan High School	Wallingford, Connecticut
G	10	Vere Anthony	6 ft 0 in (1.83 m)	—	Fr	St. Francis Prep	Queens, New York
G	11	Nathan Narcisse	6 ft 4 in (1.93 m)	—	So	Morris Catholic High School	Montclair, New Jersey
F	12	Timothy Coleman	6 ft 7 in (2.01 m)	—	Jr	Hillhouse High School	New Haven, Connecticut
G	13	John Oladipo	6 ft 2 in (1.88 m)	—	Fr	Mount Saint Charles Academy	Pawtucket, Rhode Island
G/F	14	Teshaun Steele	6 ft 7 in (2.01 m)	—	Fr	Darrow School	Worcester, Massachusetts
F	15	Andre Pasha	6 ft 9 in (2.06 m)	—	So	Mohawk Valley Community College	Syracuse, New York
F	20	Tristan Burth	6 ft 8 in (2.03 m)	—	Fr	Bridgeport Prep	Bronx, New York
G/F	21	Zoumana Traore	6 ft 8 in (2.03 m)	—	Fr	Millbrook School	Harlem, New York
G	22	Maison Adeleye	6 ft 3 in (1.91 m)	—	GS	UT Permian Basin	Arlington, Texas
G	23	Najimi George	6 ft 4 in (1.93 m)	—	So	Kolbe Cathedral High School	Bridgeport, Connecticut
G	25	Kyle Kearson	6 ft 4 in (1.93 m)	—	Sr	West Haven High School	West Haven, Connecticut
G	31	Matiss Ogle	6 ft 5 in (1.96 m)	—	Fr	Fingal Community College	Naul, Ireland

Head coach

- Ted Hotaling (Albany)

Assistant coach(es)

- Rob DePersia (Rowan)
- Spencer Jenney (Penn State)
- Trayon Rumley (Hartford)

Legend

- (C) Team captain
- (S) Suspended
- (I) Ineligible
- (W) Walk-on
- Injured
- Current redshirt

Roster
Last update: October 29, 2025

== Schedule and results ==
Date time, TV	Rank^{#}	Opponent^{#}	Result	Record	Site (attendance) city, state
Non-conference regular season
November 3, 2025*; 7:00 pm, ESPN+		at No. 4 UConn; UConn MTE	L 55–79	0–1	Gampel Pavilion (10,244); Storrs, CT
November 7, 2025*; 1:00 pm, NECFR		Columbia; UConn MTE	L 53–71	0–2	Hazell Center (783); West Haven, CT
November 8, 2025*; 1:00 pm, NECFR		Penn State	L 43–87	0–3	Hazell Center (1,087); West Haven, CT
November 10, 2025*; 6:00 pm, ESPN+		at UMass Lowell; UConn MTE	W 73–67	1–3	Kennedy Family Athletic Complex (614); Lowell, MA
November 15, 2025*; 1:00 pm, NECFR		Delaware State	W 65–52	2–3	Hazell Center (673); West Haven, CT
November 18, 2025*; 7:00 pm, ESPN+		at Seton Hall	L 45–68	2–4	Prudential Center (6,201); Newark, NJ
November 22, 2025*; 1:00 pm, NECFR		Vermont State–Lyndon	W 122–51	3–4	Hazell Center (426); West Haven, CT
November 25, 2025*; 7:00 pm, NECFR		Salve Regina	W 78–47	4–4	Hazell Center (277); West Haven, CT
November 30, 2025*; 1:00 pm, NECFR		Mitchell	W 92–69	5–4	Hazell Center (212); West Haven, CT
December 6, 2025*; 12:00 pm, ACCN		at Boston College	L 63–67	5–5	Conte Forum (4,064); Chestnut Hill, MA
December 10, 2025*; 7:00 pm, ESPN+		at NJIT	L 64−70	5−6	Wellness and Events Center (792); Newark, NJ
December 22, 2025*; 11:00 am, ESPN+		at Fordham	L 47–65	5–7	Rose Hill Gymnasium (2,800); Bronx, NY
December 29, 2025*; 6:00 pm, SECN+		at No. 11 Vanderbilt	L 53–96	5–8	Memorial Gymnasium (8,314); Nashville, TN
NEC regular season
January 2, 2026; 7:00 pm, NECFR		at Stonehill	W 70–55	6–8 (1–0)	Merkert Gymnasium (116); Easton, MA
January 4, 2026; 1:00 pm, NECFR		at Central Connecticut	L 61–72	6–9 (1–1)	William H. Detrick Gymnasium (1,118); New Britain, CT
January 8, 2025; 7:00 pm, NECFR		at Le Moyne	L 47–73	6–10 (1–2)	Ted Grant Court (273); DeWitt, NY
January 10, 2026; 1:00 pm, NECFR		Fairleigh Dickinson	W 65–55	7–10 (2–2)	Hazell Center (387); West Haven, CT
January 17, 2026; 1:00 pm, NECFR		Wagner	W 80–74	8–10 (3–2)	Hazell Center (487); West Haven, CT
January 19, 2026; 6:00 pm, NECFR		at Chicago State	W 62–56	9–10 (4–2)	Jones Convocation Center (71); Chicago, IL
January 23, 2026; 11:30 am, NECFR		Mercyhurst	W 57–51	9–11 (4–3)	Hazell Center (487); West Haven, CT
January 25, 2026; 1:00 pm, NECFR		Saint Francis	Postponed to February 24 due to snowstorm		Hazell Center; West Haven, CT
January 29, 2026; 7:00 pm, NECFR		at Mercyhurst	L 51–70	9–12 (4–4)	Owen McCormick Court (900); Erie, PA
January 31, 2026; 1:00 pm, NECFR		at Saint Francis	W 81–69	10–12 (5–4)	DeGol Arena (709); Loretto, PA
February 5, 2026; 7:00 pm, NECFR		at LIU	L 55–60	10–13 (0–5)	Steinberg Wellness Center (296); Brooklyn, NY
February 7, 2026; 1:00 pm, NECFR		Chicago State	L 57–63	10–14 (5–6)	Hazell Center (590); West Haven, CT
February 12, 2026; 7:00 pm, NECFR		Central Connecticut	L 76–81	10–15 (5–7)	Hazell Center (903); West Haven, CT
February 14, 2026; 1:00 pm, NECFR		LIU	W 55–52	11–15 (6–7)	Hazell Center (667); West Haven, CT
February 19, 2026; 7:00 pm, NECFR		Stonehill	W 64–51	12–15 (7–7)	Hazell Center (776); West Haven, CT
February 21, 2026; 2:00 pm, NECFR		at Fairleigh Dickinson	W 84–77	13–15 (8–7)	Bogota Savings Bank Center (752); Hackensack, NJ
February 24, 2026; 6:00 pm, NECFR		Saint Francis	L 67–73	13–16 (8–8)	Hazell Center (50); West Haven, CT
February 26, 2026; 7:00 pm, NECFR		at Wagner	L 62–65	13–17 (8–9)	Spiro Sports Center (384); Staten Island, NY
February 28, 2026; 1:00 pm, NECFR		Le Moyne	W 66–59	14–17 (9–9)	Hazell Center (950); West Haven, CT
*Non-conference game. ^{#}Rankings from AP Poll. (#) Tournament seedings in parentheses. All times are in Eastern.
