= 2025–26 Wagner Seahawks men's basketball team =

American college basketball season

2025–26 Wagner Seahawks men's basketball
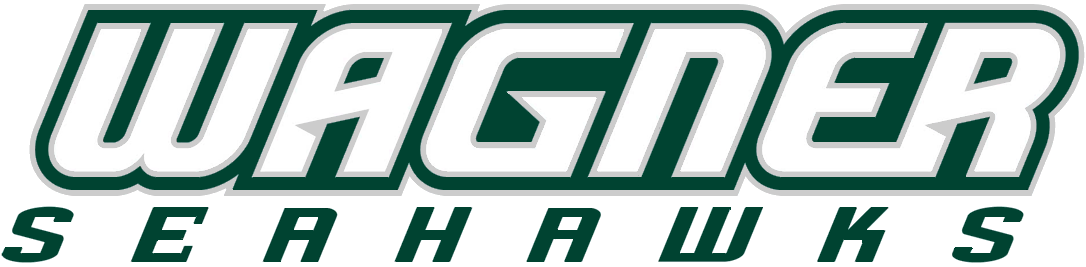
- Conference: Northeast Conference
- Record: 14–17 (8–10 NEC)
- Head coach: Donald Copeland (4th season); Dwan McMillan (interim)
- Assistant coaches: Chad Gayle; Kyle Smyth; Corey Fisher
- Home arena: Spiro Sports Center

2025–26 NEC men's basketball standings
	Conf.				Overall
Team	W		L	PCT	W		L	PCT
LIU	15	–	3	.833	22	–	10	.688
Central Connecticut	12	–	6	.667	18	–	12	.600
Mercyhurst *	10	–	8	.556	16	–	16	.500
Le Moyne *	10	–	8	.556	15	–	17	.469
New Haven **	9	–	9	.500	14	–	17	.452
Stonehill	8	–	10	.444	12	–	20	.375
Fairleigh Dickinson	8	–	10	.444	11	–	21	.344
Wagner	8	–	10	.444	14	–	16	.467
Chicago State	5	–	13	.278	7	–	25	.219
Saint Francis	5	–	13	.278	7	–	24	.226
† 2026 NEC tournament winner * ineligible for the 2026 NCAA tournament due to transition from Division II ** ineligible for both the 2026 NEC tournament and the 2026 NCAA tournament due to transition from Division II; As of March 4, 2026

The 2025–26 Wagner Seahawks men's basketball team represented Wagner College during the 2025–26 NCAA Division I men's basketball season. The Seahawks were initially led by fourth-year head coach Donald Copeland. Following Copeland's suspension for player mistreatment, assistant coach Dwan McMillan was named interim head coach. The Seahawks played their home games at the Spiro Sports Center in Staten Island, New York as members of the Northeast Conference (NEC).

== Previous season ==
The Seahawks finished the 2024–25 season 14–16, 6–10 in NEC play, to finish in seventh place. They were defeated by Saint Francis in the quarterfinals of the NEC tournament.

== Offseason ==
=== Departures ===
Departures
Name	No.	Pos.	Height	Weight	Year	Hometown	Reason for Departure
Rahmir Moore	0	G	6'3"	205	Graduate Student	Philadelphia, PA	Completed eligibility
Javier Ezquerra	1	G	6'1"	175	Senior	San Juan, Puerto Rico	Graduated
Di'Andre Howell-South	2	G	6'4"	210	Senior	Paterson, NJ	Transferred to Holy Family
Ja'Kair Sanchez	3	G	6'4"	200	Graduate Student	Syracuse, NY	Completed eligibility
Tyje Kelton	4	F	6'7"	210	Senior	Dunellen, NJ	Entered transfer portal
Zae Blake	5	G	6'1"	180	Graduate Student	Washington, DC	Transferred to UTRGV
R.J. Greene	10	G	6'5"	200	Junior	The Bronx, NY	Left team
Zaire Williams	12	G	6'4"	200	Senior	Brooklyn, NY	Transferred to Mercer
Churchill Bounds	22	F	6'10"	260	RS Senior	Berlin, MD	Transferred to Salisbury
Rob Taylor II	24	F	6'7"	220	Senior	Brooklyn, NY	Graduated
Keyontae Lewis	32	F	6'9"	260	Junior	Chesterfield, VA	Transferred to Norfolk State

=== Incoming transfers ===
Incoming transfers
Name	No.	Pos.	Height	Weight	Year	Hometown	Previous School
Nick Jones	0	G	6'2"	170	Junior	Edgewood, MD	Harcum
John Awoke	4	G	6'3"	185	Junior	Alexandria, VA	South Plains
Michael Cooper	5	G	6'6"	215	Junior	Minneapolis, MN	Vincennes
Eddie Placer	7	G	6'5"	200	Junior	Orlando, FL	Daytona State
Jaden Baker	9	G	6'2"	190	RS Senior	Salisbury, MD	Frostburg State
Bryan Akanmu	10	F	6'6"	230	Junior	Saint-Denis, France	Vincennes
Huascar Cuevas	12	G	5'11"	180	Junior	Santo Domingo, Dominican Republic	Daytona State
Binael Basil	22	F	6'7"	240	Sophomore	Ottawa, Canada	Casper College
Sam Smith	24	F	6'6"	235	Graduate Student	Gurdon, AR	Harding

=== 2024 recruiting class ===
College recruiting information
Name	Hometown	School	Height	Weight	Commit date
Elijah Brown; G	Atlantic City, NJ	Hillcrest Prep	6 ft 4 in (1.93 m)	200 lb (91 kg)	Nov 21, 2024
Elijah Brown; G	Recruit ratings: No ratings found				
Overall recruit ranking:
Note: In many cases, Scout, Rivals, 247Sports, On3, and ESPN may conflict in their listings of height and weight.; In these cases, the average was taken. ESPN grades are on a 100-point scale.; Sources: "2025 Wagner Signees". ESPN.; "2025 Team Ranking". Rivals.

== Preseason polls ==
=== Northeast Conference poll ===
The Northeast Conference released its preseason coaches' poll on October 27, 2025. The Seahawks were picked to finish eighth in the conference.

Rank	Team
1.	LIU (10)
2.	Central Connecticut
3.	Stonehill
4.	Mercyhurst
5.	Fairleigh Dickinson
6.	Chicago State
7.	Saint Francis
8.	Wagner
9.	Le Moyne
10.	New Haven

() first-place votes

=== Preseason All-Conference Team ===
No Seahawks were selected as members of the NEC Preseason All-Conference Team.

== Roster ==
2025–26 Wagner Seahawks men's basketball team
Players
Coaches

Pos.	#	Name	Height	Weight	Year	Previous school	Hometown
G	0	Nick Jones	6 ft 2 in (1.88 m)	170 lb (77 kg)	Jr	Harcum College	Edgewood, MD
F	1	Zavier Fitch	6 ft 7 in (2.01 m)	210 lb (95 kg)	So	Brother Rice HS (IL)	Chicago, IL
G	3	Elijah Brown	6 ft 4 in (1.93 m)	200 lb (91 kg)	Fr	Hillcrest Prep	Atlantic City, NJ
G	4	John Awoke	6 ft 3 in (1.91 m)	185 lb (84 kg)	Jr	South Plains College	Alexandria, VA
G	5	Michael Cooper	6 ft 6 in (1.98 m)	215 lb (98 kg)	Jr	Vincennes University	Minneapolis, MN
G	7	Eddie Placer	6 ft 5 in (1.96 m)	200 lb (91 kg)	Jr	Daytona State	Orlando, FL
G	9	Jaden Baker	6 ft 2 in (1.88 m)	190 lb (86 kg)	RS Sr	Frostburg State	Salisbury, MD
F	10	Bryan Akanmu	6 ft 6 in (1.98 m)	230 lb (104 kg)	Jr	Vincennes University	Saint-Denis, France
G	12	Huascar Cuevas	5 ft 11 in (1.8 m)	180 lb (82 kg)	Jr	Daytona State	Santo Domingo, Dominican Republic
G/F	15	Makhai Anderson	6 ft 6 in (1.98 m)	195 lb (88 kg)	So	Solebury School	Hamden, CT
F	22	Binael Basil	6 ft 7 in (2.01 m)	240 lb (109 kg)	So	Casper College	Ottawa, Canada
F	24	Sam Smith	6 ft 6 in (1.98 m)	235 lb (107 kg)	GS	Harding University	Gurdon, AR

Head coach

- Donald Copeland (Seton Hall)
- Dwan McMillan (Interim) (Hofstra)

Assistant coach(es)

- Corey Fisher (Villanova)
- Chad Gayle (Hampton)
- Kyle Smyth (Iona)

Legend

- (C) Team captain
- (S) Suspended
- (I) Ineligible
- (W) Walk-on
- Injured
- Current redshirt

Roster
Last update: November 13, 2025

== Schedule and results ==
Date time, TV	Rank^{#}	Opponent^{#}	Result	Record	High points	High rebounds	High assists	Site (attendance) city, state
Non-conference regular season
November 3, 2025*; 7:00 p.m.		at VCU	L 74–103	0–1	16 – Smith	9 – Basil	4 – Baker	Stuart C. Siegel Center (7,637); Richmond, VA
November 7, 2025*; 7:30 p.m.		at Seton Hall	L 61–68	0–2	20 – Awoke	8 – Fitch	4 – Baker	Walsh Gymnasium (1,308); South Orange, NJ
November 11, 2025*; 7:00 p.m.		at Fordham	L 61–63	0–3	20 – Placer	6 – Smith	6 – Baker	Rose Hill Gym (688); The Bronx, NY
November 16, 2025*; 12:00 p.m., ESPN+		at UMBC	L 70–71 ^{OT}	0–4	20 – Jones	8 – Placer	1 – Tied	Chesapeake Employers Insurance Arena (1,062); Catonsville, MD
November 22, 2025*; 12:05 p.m., ESPN+		at Georgetown	L 75–92	0–5	22 – Baker	9 – Jones	4 – Baker	Capital One Arena (4,184); Washington, DC
November 26, 2025*; 5:00 p.m., ESPN+		at Manhattan	W 103–101 ^{OT}	1–5	35 – Jones	10 – Fitch	6 – Jones	Draddy Gymnasium (1,312); Riverdale, NY
December 2, 2025*; 8:00 p.m., BTN		at Maryland	L 63–89	1–6	16 – Jones	7 – Baker	3 – Fitch	Xfinity Center (10,155); College Park, MD
December 6, 2025*; 1:00 p.m., NEC Front Row		Bryant & Stratton–Albany	W 92–36	2–6	21 – Smith	16 – Fitch	12 – Baker	Spiro Sports Center (412); Staten Island, NY
December 11, 2025*; 1:00 p.m., NEC Front Row		Bloomfield (NJ)	W 95–93 ^{OT}	3–6	18 – Akanmu	10 – Fitch	5 – Baker	Spiro Sports Center; Staten Island, NY
December 17, 2025*; 7:00 p.m., NEC Front Row		Maryland Eastern Shore	W 78–64	4–6	19 – Basil	6 – Basil	6 – Baker	Spiro Sports Center (350); Staten Island, NY
December 22, 2025*; 12:00 p.m., NEC Front Row		Manor College	W 74−57	5−6	13 – Jones	9 – Basil	5 – Awoke	Spiro Sports Center (239); Staten Island, NY
NEC regular season
January 2, 2026; 7:00 p.m., NEC Front Row		at Chicago State	W 79–72	6–6 (1–0)	17 – Tied	8 – Awoke	5 – Tied	Jones Convocation Center (114); Chicago, IL
January 4, 2026; 4:00 p.m., NEC Front Row		Stonehill	L 60−69	6−7 (1−1)	12 – Basil	7 – Fitch	2 – Tied	Spiro Sports Center (742); Staten Island, NY
January 8, 2026; 7:00 p.m., NEC Front Row		Saint Francis	L 69−71	6−8 (1−2)	12 – Awoke	7 – Fitch	4 – Jones	Spiro Sports Center (689); Staten Island, NY
January 10, 2026; 1:00 p.m., NEC Front Row		Mercyhurst	L 69−70	6−9 (1−3)	20 – Jones	7 – Tied	6 – Baker	Spiro Sports Center (948); Staten Island, NY
January 17, 2026; 1:00 p.m., NEC Front Row		at New Haven	L 74–80	6−10 (1−4)	20 – Jones	6 – Cooper	4 – Baker	Hazell Center (487); West Haven, CT
January 19, 2026; 1:00 p.m., NEC Front Row		at Fairleigh Dickinson	L 61–68	6−11 (1−5)	20 – Jones	6 – Jones	2 – Awoke	Bogota Savings Bank Center (325); Hackensack, NJ
January 23, 2026; 7:00 p.m., NEC Front Row		at Le Moyne	L 67–69	6−12 (1−6)	13 – Jones	12 – Akanmu	4 – Baker	Ted Grant Court (597); Syracuse, NY
January 25, 2026; 7:00 p.m., NEC Front Row		at LIU	Postponed due to winter storm					Steinberg Wellness Center; Brooklyn, NY
January 29, 2026; 7:00 p.m., NEC Front Row		Central Connecticut	L 55–62	6−13 (1−7)	17 – Gray	8 – Basil	3 – Baker	Spiro Sports Center (916); Staten Island, NY
January 31, 2026; 1:00 p.m., NEC Front Row		Fairleigh Dickinson	W 75–72 ^{OT}	7−13 (2−7)	26 – Jones	13 – Gray	3 – Placer	Spiros Sports Center (882); Staten Island, NY
February 5, 2026; 7:00 p.m., NEC Front Row		Le Moyne	W 79–78	8−13 (3−7)	24 – Jones	8 – Basil	6 – Jones	Spiro Sports Center (728); Staten Island, NY
February 7, 2026; 1:00 p.m., NEC Front Row		at Central Connecticut	L 67–84	8−14 (3−8)	26 – Placer	7 – Akanmu	3 – Akanmu	Detrick Gymnasium (732); New Britain, CT
February 12, 2026; 7:00 p.m., NEC Front Row		LIU	L 57–67	8−15 (3−9)	17 – Jones	13 – Basil	3 – Akanmu	Spiro Sports Center (743); Staten Island, NY
February 14, 2026; 2:00 p.m., NEC Front Row		at Stonehill	W 68–57	9−15 (4−9)	16 – Basil	16 – Basil	3 – Jones	Merkert Gymnasium (260); North Easton, MA
February 16, 2026; 7:00 p.m., NEC Front Row		at LIU	L 65–83	9–16 (4–10)	10 – Akanmu	6 – Tied	5 – Jones	Steinberg Wellness Center (578); Brooklyn, NY
February 19, 2026; 7:00 p.m., NEC Front Row		at Mercyhurst	W 83–80 ^{OT}	10−16 (5−10)	19 – Jones	10 – Gray	2 – Tied	Owen McCormick Court (671); Erie, PA
February 21, 2026; 7:00 p.m., NEC Front Row		at Saint Francis	W 65–56	11−16 (6−10)	27 – Gray	11 – Gray	3 – Tied	DeGol Arena (1,068); Loretto, PA
February 26, 2026; 7:00 p.m., NEC Front Row		New Haven	W 65–62	12−16 (7−10)	15 – Awoke	13 – Gray	3 – Tied	Spiro Sports Center (384); Staten Island, NY
February 28, 2026; 1:00 p.m., NEC Front Row		Chicago State	W 80–61	13−16 (8−10)	16 – Gray	12 – Gray	8 – Jones	Spiro Sports Center (571); Staten Island, NY
NEC tournament
March 4, 2026; 7:00 p.m., NEC Front Row	(7)	at (2) Central Connecticut; Quarterfinals	W 70–60	14–16	18 – Awoke	8 – Basil	3 – Awoke	Detrick Gymnasium (2,105); New Britain, CT
March 7, 2026; 2:00 p.m., ESPN+	(7)	at (1) LIU; Semifinals	L 56–64	14–17	27 – Jones	9 – Basil	3 – Basil	Steinberg Wellness Center (1,028); Brooklyn, NY
*Non-conference game. ^{#}Rankings from AP poll. (#) Tournament seedings in parentheses. All times are in Eastern.
