= 2025–26 Mercyhurst Lakers men's basketball team =

American college basketball season

2025–26 Mercyhurst Lakers men's basketball
- Conference: Northeast Conference
- Record: 17–17 (10–8 NEC)
- Head coach: Gary Manchel (24th season)
- Assistant coaches: Joe Causgrove; Derek Spanellis; Chance Wright; Kyle Milligan
- Home arena: Owen McCormick Court

2025–26 NEC men's basketball standings
	Conf.				Overall
Team	W		L	PCT	W		L	PCT
LIU †	15	–	3	.833	24	–	11	.686
Central Connecticut	12	–	6	.667	18	–	12	.600
Mercyhurst *	10	–	8	.556	17	–	17	.500
Le Moyne *	10	–	8	.556	15	–	17	.469
New Haven **	9	–	9	.500	14	–	17	.452
Stonehill	8	–	10	.444	12	–	21	.364
Fairleigh Dickinson	8	–	10	.444	11	–	21	.344
Wagner	8	–	10	.444	14	–	17	.452
Chicago State	5	–	13	.278	7	–	25	.219
Saint Francis	5	–	13	.278	7	–	24	.226
† 2026 NEC tournament winner * ineligible for the 2026 NCAA tournament due to transition from Division II ** ineligible for both the 2026 NEC tournament and the 2026 NCAA tournament due to transition from Division II

The 2025–26 Mercyhurst Lakers men's basketball team represented Mercyhurst University during the 2025–26 NCAA Division I men's basketball season. The Lakers, led by 24th-year head coach Gary Manchel, played their home games on Owen McCormick Court in the Mercyhurst Athletic Center in Erie, Pennsylvania as second-year members of the Northeast Conference.

== Previous season ==
The Lakers finished the 2024–25 season 15–16, 9–7 in NEC play, in third place. Due to their transition from Division II to Division I, the Lakers were ineligible to participate in the NEC tournament.

== Preseason ==
On October 27, 2025, the NEC released their preseason coaches poll. Mercyhurst was picked to finish fourth in the conference.

=== Preseason rankings ===
NEC Preseason Poll
Place	Team
1	LIU*
2	Central Connecticut
3	Stonehill
4	Mercyhurst
5	Fairleigh Dickinson
6	Chicago State
7	Saint Francis
8	Wagner
9	Le Moyne
10	New Haven
(*) Unanimous selection

=== Preseason All-NEC Team ===
Preseason All-NEC Team
Player	Position	Class
Bernie Blunt III	Guard	Graduate Student

== Roster ==
2025–26 Mercyhurst Lakers men's basketball team
Players
Coaches

Pos.	#	Name	Height	Weight	Year	Previous school	Hometown
G	1	Sean Lang	6 ft 3 in (1.91 m)	205 lb (93 kg)	GS	Linganore High School	New Market, Maryland
G	2	Brady Conner	6 ft 6 in (1.98 m)	200 lb (91 kg)	Fr	Archbishop Alter High School	Bellbrook, Ohio
F	3	Cameron Johnson	6 ft 5 in (1.96 m)	200 lb (91 kg)	Jr	Lake Erie	Shepherdstown, West Virginia
G	4	Bernie Blunt III	5 ft 11 in (1.8 m)	180 lb (82 kg)	GS	Edinboro	Morgantown, Pennsylvania
F	5	Mykolas Ivanauskas	6 ft 8 in (2.03 m)	215 lb (98 kg)	So	Sunrise Christian Academy	Chicago, Illinois
G	7	Deshaun Jackson Jr.	6 ft 2 in (1.88 m)	175 lb (79 kg)	So	Newport High School	Covington, Kentucky
G	10	Christian Gamble	6 ft 0 in (1.83 m)	195 lb (88 kg)	Sr	Sidwell Friends School	Silver Spring, Maryland
G	11	Jake Lemelman	6 ft 2 in (1.88 m)	165 lb (75 kg)	So	MacDuffie School	Newton, Massachusetts
F	12	Qadir Martin	6 ft 5 in (1.96 m)	215 lb (98 kg)	So	St. Peter's Boys High School	Staten Island, New York
F	13	Chris Leman	6 ft 9 in (2.06 m)	220 lb (100 kg)	Fr	Worcester Academy	New Orleans, Louisiana
G	15	Kaden Fuhrmann	6 ft 5 in (1.96 m)	195 lb (88 kg)	GS	Taylor	Liberty Township, Ohio
G	21	Emilis Butkus	6 ft 6 in (1.98 m)	220 lb (100 kg)	Sr	Rollins	Klaipėda, Lithuania
G	23	Or Faran	6 ft 5 in (1.96 m)	203 lb (92 kg)	Fr	Shimon Ben Zvi Givatayim	Givatayim, Israel
G	33	Vladimir Pavlovic	6 ft 2 in (1.88 m)	200 lb (91 kg)	Jr	California	Herceg Novi, Montenegro
F	34	James Thomas	6 ft 6 in (1.98 m)	230 lb (104 kg)	Sr	Chatham	Sharpsville, Pennsylvania

Head coach

- Gary Manchel (Vermont)

Assistant coach(es)

- Joe Causgrove (Penn State Behrend)
- Derek Spanellis (Dickinson)
- Chance Wright (Mercyhurst)
- Kyle Milligan (Russell Sage)

Legend

- (C) Team captain
- (S) Suspended
- (I) Ineligible
- (W) Walk-on
- Injured
- Current redshirt

Roster
Last update: November 16, 2025

== Schedule and results ==
Date time, TV	Rank^{#}	Opponent^{#}	Result	Record	Site (attendance) city, state
Non-conference regular season
November 3, 2025*; 8:00 pm, B1G+		at Northwestern	L 47–70	0–1	Welsh–Ryan Arena (4,607); Evanston, IL
November 6, 2025*; 9:00 pm, ESPN+		at Loyola Chicago	W 73–65	1–1	Joseph J. Gentile Arena (2,016); Chicago, IL
November 8, 2025*; 3:00 pm, NECFR		Penn State New Kensington	W 93–43	2–1	Owen McCormick Court (118); Erie, PA
November 12, 2025*; 7:00 pm, ESPN+		at Canisius	L 55–58	2–2	Koessler Athletic Center (815); Buffalo, NY
November 15, 2025*; 4:00 pm, NECFR		Morgan State	W 86–72	3–2	Owen McCormick Court (372); Erie, PA
November 20, 2025*; 7:00 pm, ESPN+		at Miami (OH); Marshall MTE	L 71–76	3–3	Millett Hall (1,633); Oxford, OH
November 23, 2025*; 7:00 pm, ESPN+		at Marshall; Marshall MTE	L 60–69	3–4	Cam Henderson Center (3,433); Huntington, WV
November 30, 2025*; 3:00 pm, ESPN+		at West Virginia	L 38–70	3–5	Hope Coliseum (10,319); Morgantown, WV
December 5, 2025*; 7:00 pm, ESPN+		at Lafayette	L 71–79	3–6	Kirby Sports Center (1,144); Easton, PA
December 7, 2025*; 2:00 pm, NECFR		Bethany (WV)	W 80–51	4–6	Owen McCormick Court (321); Erie, PA
December 13, 2025*; 2:00 pm, ESPN+		at Davidson	L 47–80	4–7	John M. Belk Arena (2,130); Davidson, NC
December 17, 2025*; 7:00 pm, ACCNX		at Syracuse	L 62−76	4−8	JMA Wireless Dome (12,258); Syracuse, NY
December 20, 2025*; 2:00 pm, NECFR		Binghamton	W 82−61	5−8	Owen McCormick Court (182); Erie, PA
NEC regular season
January 2, 2026; 7:30 pm, NECFR		Fairleigh Dickinson	L 67–74	5–9 (0–1)	Owen McCormick Court (257); Erie, PA
January 4, 2026; 2:00 pm, NECFR		Le Moyne	W 74–60	6–9 (1–1)	Owen McCormick Court (150); Erie, PA
January 8, 2026; 7:00 pm, NECFR		at LIU	L 58–60	6–10 (1–2)	Steinberg Wellness Center (324); Brooklyn, NY
January 10, 2026; 1:00 pm, NECFR		at Wagner	W 70–69	7–10 (2–2)	Spiro Sports Center (948); Staten Island, NY
January 17, 2026; 2:00 pm, NECFR		Stonehill	L 57–62	7–11 (2–3)	Owen McCormick Court (956); Erie, PA
January 19, 2026; 2:00 pm, NECFR		Central Connecticut	W 79–61	8–11 (3–3)	Owen McCormick Court (567); Erie, PA
January 23, 2026; 11:30 am, NECFR		at New Haven	W 61–57	9–11 (4–3)	Hazell Center (487); West Haven, CT
January 25, 2026; 2:00 pm, NECFR		Chicago State	W 61–59	10–11 (5–3)	Owen McCormick Court (356); Erie, PA
January 29, 2026; 7:00 pm, NECFR		New Haven	W 70–51	11–11 (6–3)	Owen McCormick Court (900); Erie, PA
January 31, 2026; 2:00 pm, NECFR		at Chicago State	L 74–78	11–12 (6–4)	Jones Convocation Center (141); Chicago, IL
February 5, 2026; 7:00 pm, NECFR		Saint Francis	W 98–89	12–12 (7–4)	Owen McCormick Court (932); Erie, PA
February 7, 2026; 3:30 pm, NECFR		at Fairleigh Dickinson	L 52–55	12–13 (7–5)	Bogota Savings Bank Center (789); Hackensack, NJ
February 12, 2026; 7:00 pm, NECFR		at Le Moyne	L 57–58	12–14 (7–6)	Ted Grant Court (578); DeWitt, NY
February 14, 2026; 2:00 pm, NECFR		at Saint Francis	W 97–79	13–14 (8–6)	DeGol Arena (910); Loretto, PA
February 19, 2026; 7:00 pm, NECFR		Wagner	L 80–83 ^{OT}	13–15 (8–7)	Owen McCormick Court (671); Erie, PA
February 21, 2026; 2:00 pm, NECFR		LIU	W 91–83	14–15 (9–7)	Owen McCormick Court (956); Erie, PA
February 26, 2026; 7:00 pm, NECFR		at Central Connecticut	L 78–80	14–16 (9–8)	William H. Detrick Gymnasium (914); New Britain, CT
February 28, 2026; 2:00 pm, NECFR		at Stonehill	W 75–72 ^{OT}	15–16 (10–8)	Merkert Gymnasium (415); Easton, MA
NEC tournament
March 4, 2026; 7:00 pm, NECFR	(3)	(6) Fairleigh Dickinson; Quarterfinals	W 70–61	16–16	Owen McCormick Court (1,027); Erie, PA
March 7, 2026; 12:00 pm, NECFR	(3)	(5) Stonehill; Semifinals	W 56–51	17–16	Owen McCormick Court (567); Erie, PA
March 10, 2026; 7:00 pm, ESPN2	(3)	at (1) LIU; Championship	L 70–79	17–17	Steinberg Wellness Center (1,562); Brooklyn, NY
*Non-conference game. ^{#}Rankings from AP Poll. (#) Tournament seedings in parentheses. All times are in Eastern.
