= 2025–26 Fairleigh Dickinson Knights men's basketball team =

American college basketball season

2025–26 Fairleigh Dickinson Knights men's basketball
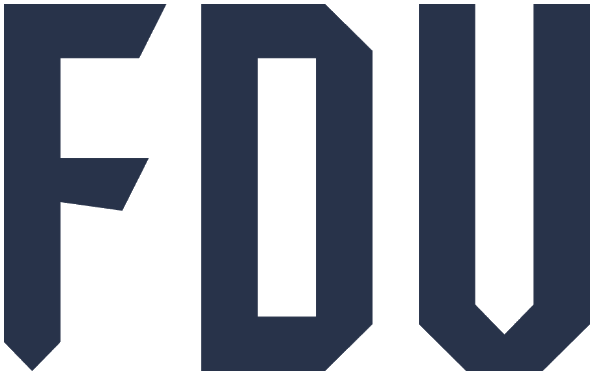
- Conference: Northeast Conference
- Record: 11–21 (8–10 NEC)
- Head coach: Jack Castleberry (3rd season)
- Associate head coach: Josh Hayes
- Assistant coaches: Tom Kiely; Nate Stitchell
- Home arena: Bogota Savings Bank Center

2025–26 NEC men's basketball standings
	Conf.				Overall
Team	W		L	PCT	W		L	PCT
LIU	15	–	3	.833	22	–	10	.688
Central Connecticut	12	–	6	.667	18	–	12	.600
Mercyhurst *	10	–	8	.556	16	–	16	.500
Le Moyne *	10	–	8	.556	15	–	17	.469
New Haven **	9	–	9	.500	14	–	17	.452
Stonehill	8	–	10	.444	12	–	20	.375
Fairleigh Dickinson	8	–	10	.444	11	–	21	.344
Wagner	8	–	10	.444	14	–	16	.467
Chicago State	5	–	13	.278	7	–	25	.219
Saint Francis	5	–	13	.278	7	–	24	.226
† 2026 NEC tournament winner * ineligible for the 2026 NCAA tournament due to transition from Division II ** ineligible for both the 2026 NEC tournament and the 2026 NCAA tournament due to transition from Division II; As of March 4, 2026

The 2025–26 Fairleigh Dickinson Knights men's basketball team represented Fairleigh Dickinson University during the 2025–26 NCAA Division I men's basketball season. The Knights, led by third-year head coach Jack Castleberry, played their home games at the Bogota Savings Bank Center in Hackensack, New Jersey, as members of the Northeast Conference.

== Previous season ==
The Knights finished the 2024–25 season 13–20, 8–8 in NEC play, to finish in a tie for fourth place. They defeated Stonehill, before falling to top-seeded Central Connecticut in the semifinals of the NEC tournament.

== Preseason ==
On October 27, 2025, the NEC released their preseason coaches poll. Fairleigh Dickinson was picked to finish fifth in the conference.

=== Preseason rankings ===
NEC Preseason Poll
Place	Team
1	LIU*
2	Central Connecticut
3	Stonehill
4	Mercyhurst
5	Fairleigh Dickinson
6	Chicago State
7	Saint Francis
8	Wagner
9	Le Moyne
10	New Haven
(*) Unanimous selection

=== Preseason All-NEC Team ===
No players were named to the All-NEC Preseason Team.

== Roster ==
2025–26 Fairleigh Dickinson Knights men's basketball team
Players
Coaches

Pos.	#	Name	Height	Weight	Year	Previous school	Hometown
G	0	Joey Niesman	6 ft 2 in (1.88 m)	185 lb (84 kg)	GS	McKendree	Oswego, Illinois
G	1	Kody Frey	6 ft 6 in (1.98 m)	177 lb (80 kg)	Fr	Green Hope High School	Raleigh, North Carolina
F	2	Taeshaud Jackson	6 ft 6 in (1.98 m)	221 lb (100 kg)	Sr	Northern Colorado	Denver, Colorado
G	3	Raysean Johnson	6 ft 1 in (1.85 m)	180 lb (82 kg)	So	Canterbury School	Montgomery, New York
G	5	Chidube Ekwommadu	6 ft 6 in (1.98 m)	195 lb (88 kg)	So	Fort Erie International Academy	Mississauga, Ontario
G	7	Eric Parnell	6 ft 3 in (1.91 m)	178 lb (81 kg)	Sr	Hofstra	Melbourne, Florida
G	8	Noah Melson	6 ft 6 in (1.98 m)	185 lb (84 kg)	Jr	Chattanooga	Douglasville, Georgia
F/C	9	Sebastian Haubro	6 ft 10 in (2.08 m)	208 lb (94 kg)	Fr	BMS Herlev	Ballerup, Denmark
G	11	Tyler McQuaid	6 ft 0 in (1.83 m)	181 lb (82 kg)	Fr	Bergen Catholic High School	Maywood, New Jersey
G	15	Josiah Francis	6 ft 8 in (2.03 m)	200 lb (91 kg)	So	United Scholastic Academy	Scarborough, Ontario
F	21	Cole Alexander	6 ft 7 in (2.01 m)	215 lb (98 kg)	GS	The Citadel	Charleston, South Carolina
C	22	Cyril Martynov	7 ft 0 in (2.13 m)	223 lb (101 kg)	Sr	Eastern Kentucky	Barrie, Ontario
G	24	Ras Elijah Godbolt	6 ft 0 in (1.83 m)	177 lb (80 kg)	Fr	The Albany Academy	Albany, New York
G	30	Andrew Canda	6 ft 0 in (1.83 m)	164 lb (74 kg)	So	Virginia Academy	Woodbridge, Virginia
G	35	David Jevtic	6 ft 8 in (2.03 m)	197 lb (89 kg)	Fr	KK Kolubara LA 2003	Belgrade, Serbia
F/C	55	Arthur Cox	6 ft 8 in (2.03 m)	215 lb (98 kg)	GS	West Virginia State	Fayetteville, Arkansas

Head coach

- Jack Castleberry (VMI)

Assistant coach(es)

- Josh Hayes (Methodist)
- Tom Kiely (Seton Hall)
- Nate Stitchell (Keene State)

Legend

- (C) Team captain
- (S) Suspended
- (I) Ineligible
- (W) Walk-on
- Injured
- Current redshirt

Roster
Last update: November 18, 2025

== Schedule and results ==
Date time, TV	Rank^{#}	Opponent^{#}	Result	Record	Site (attendance) city, state
Non-conference regular season
November 3, 2025*; 8:00 pm, ESPN+		at No. 16 Iowa State	L 50–88	0–1	Hilton Coliseum (13,332); Ames, IA
November 8, 2025*; 2:00 pm, ESPN+		at Saint Peter's	L 83–93	0–2	Run Baby Run Arena (575); Jersey City, NJ
November 12, 2025*; 8:00 pm, SECN+		at Texas	L 58–93	0–3	Moody Center (9,820); Austin, TX
November 15, 2025*; 4:00 pm, ESPN+		at NJIT	L 81–93	0–4	Wellness and Events Center (790); Newark, NJ
November 18, 2025*; 7:00 pm, NECFR		Saint Elizabeth	W 100–58	1–4	Bogota Savings Bank Center (345); Hackensack, NJ
November 24, 2025*; 12:00 pm, YES/NECFR		East Texas A&M; FDU Basketball Classic	L 65–70	1–5	Bogota Savings Bank Center (700); Hackensack, NJ
November 26, 2025*; 2:00 pm, YES/NECFR		Army; FDU Basketball Classic	L 73–81	1–6	Bogota Savings Bank Center (409); Hackensack, NJ
December 2, 2025*; 7:00 pm, ESPN+		at Providence	L 64–94	1–7	Amica Mutual Pavilion (6,285); Providence, RI
December 4, 2025*; 4:00 pm, NECFR		Manor	W 86−38	2−7	Bogota Savings Bank Center (430); Hackensack, NJ
December 10, 2025*; 7:00 pm, ESPN+		at Fordham	L 54–75	2–8	Rose Hill Gymnasium (604); Bronx, NY
December 19, 2025*; 3:00 pm, NECFR		Lehman	W 76−42	3−8	Bogota Savings Bank Center; Hackensack, NJ
December 22, 2025*; 7:00 pm, ACCNX		at Boston College	L 61−72	3−9	Conte Forum (2,833); Chestnut Hill, MA
December 29, 2025*; 9:00 pm, BTN		at Minnesota	L 43−60	3−10	Williams Arena (7,638); Minneapolis, MN
NEC regular season
January 2, 2026; 7:30 pm, NECFR		at Mercyhurst	W 74−67	4−10 (1−0)	Owen McCormick Court (257); Erie, PA
January 4, 2026; 4:00 pm, NECFR		at Saint Francis	L 82–85	4–11 (1–1)	DeGol Arena (381); Loretto, PA
January 8, 2026; 5:00 pm, YES/NECFR		Chicago State	W 70−63	5−11 (2−1)	Bogota Savings Bank Center (329); Hackensack, NJ
January 10, 2026; 1:00 pm, NECFR		at New Haven	L 55−65	5−12 (2−2)	Hazell Center (387); West Haven, CT
January 17, 2026; 7:30 pm, YES/NECFR		LIU	L 59–66	5–13 (2–3)	Bogota Savings Bank Center (425); Hackensack, NJ
January 19, 2026; 2:00 pm, NECFR		Wagner	W 68–61	6–13 (3–3)	Bogota Savings Bank Center (325); Hackensack, NJ
January 23, 2026; 7:00 pm, NECFR		at Central Connecticut	W 76–66	7–13 (4–3)	William H. Detrick Gymnasium (1,045); New Britain, CT
January 26, 2026; 6:00 pm, YES/NECFR		Le Moyne	L 74–87	7–14 (4–4)	Bogota Savings Bank Center (250); Hackensack, NJ
January 29, 2026; 7:00 pm, NECFR		at Stonehill	W 58–57	7–15 (4–5)	Merkert Gymnasium (326); Easton, MA
January 31, 2026; 1:00 pm, NECFR		at Wagner	L 72–75 ^{OT}	7–16 (4–6)	Spiro Sports Center (882); Staten Island, NY
February 5, 2026; 7:00 pm, NECFR		Stonehill	W 74–58	8–16 (5–6)	Bogota Savings Bank Center (190); Hackensack, NJ
February 7, 2026; 3:30 pm, NECFR		Mercyhurst	W 55–52	9–16 (6–6)	Bogota Savings Bank Center (789); Hackensack, NJ
February 12, 2026; 7:00 pm, YES/NECFR		Saint Francis	W 66–59	10–16 (7–6)	Bogota Savings Bank Center (796); Hackensack, NJ
February 14, 2026; 2:00 pm, NECFR		Central Connecticut	L 57–63	10–17 (7–7)	Bogota Savings Bank Center (826); Hackensack, NJ
February 19, 2026; 7:00 pm, NECFR		at Chicago State	W 60–59	11–17 (8–7)	Jones Convocation Center (456); Chicago, IL
February 21, 2026; 7:00 pm, NECFR		New Haven	L 77–84	11–18 (8–8)	Bogota Savings Bank Center (752); Hackensack, NJ
February 26, 2026; 7:00 pm, NECFR		at Le Moyne	L 59–76	11–19 (8–9)	Ted Grant Court (476); DeWitt, NY
February 28, 2026; 4:00 p.m., NECFR		at LIU	L 60–74	11–20 (8–10)	Steinberg Wellness Center (801); Brooklyn, NY
NEC tournament
March 4, 2026; 7:00 pm, NECFR	(6)	at (3) Mercyhurst; Quarterfinals	L 61–70	11–21	Owen McCormick Court (1,027); Erie, PA
*Non-conference game. ^{#}Rankings from AP Poll. (#) Tournament seedings in parentheses. All times are in Eastern.
