= 2025–26 Central Connecticut Blue Devils men's basketball team =

American college basketball season

2025–26 Central Connecticut Blue Devils men's basketball
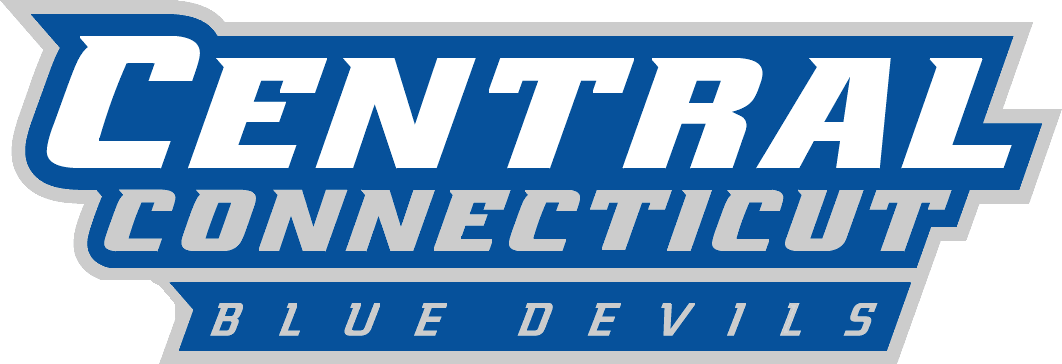
- Conference: Northeast Conference
- Record: 18–12 (12–6 NEC)
- Head coach: Patrick Sellers (5th season)
- Assistant coaches: Ben Wood; Lenny Jefferson; Ryan Olander
- Home arena: William H. Detrick Gymnasium

2025–26 NEC men's basketball standings
| | Conf. | | | | Overall |
| Team | W | | L | PCT | W | | L | PCT |
|---|---|---|---|---|---|---|---|---|
| LIU † | 15 | – | 3 | .833 | 24 | – | 11 | .686 |
| Central Connecticut | 12 | – | 6 | .667 | 18 | – | 12 | .600 |
| Mercyhurst * | 10 | – | 8 | .556 | 17 | – | 17 | .500 |
| Le Moyne * | 10 | – | 8 | .556 | 15 | – | 17 | .469 |
| New Haven ** | 9 | – | 9 | .500 | 14 | – | 17 | .452 |
| Stonehill | 8 | – | 10 | .444 | 12 | – | 21 | .364 |
| Fairleigh Dickinson | 8 | – | 10 | .444 | 11 | – | 21 | .344 |
| Wagner | 8 | – | 10 | .444 | 14 | – | 17 | .452 |
| Chicago State | 5 | – | 13 | .278 | 7 | – | 25 | .219 |
| Saint Francis | 5 | – | 13 | .278 | 7 | – | 24 | .226 |
† 2026 NEC tournament winner * ineligible for the 2026 NCAA tournament due to transition from Division II ** ineligible for both the 2026 NEC tournament and the 2026 NCAA tournament due to transition from Division II

The 2025–26 Central Connecticut Blue Devils men's basketball team represented Central Connecticut State University during the 2025–26 NCAA Division I men's basketball season. The Blue Devils, led by fifth-year head coach Patrick Sellers, played their home games at the William H. Detrick Gymnasium in New Britain, Connecticut as members of the Northeast Conference.

== Previous season ==
The Blue Devils finished the 2024–25 season 25–7, 14–2 in NEC play, to finish as NEC regular-season champions. They defeated Le Moyne, and Fairleigh Dickinson, before being upset by #3 seed Saint Francis in the NEC tournament championship game.

== Preseason ==
On October 27, 2025, the NEC released their preseason coaches poll. Central Connecticut was picked to finish second in the conference.

=== Preseason rankings ===
NEC Preseason Poll
| Place | Team |
|---|---|
| 1 | LIU* |
| 2 | Central Connecticut |
| 3 | Stonehill |
| 4 | Mercyhurst |
| 5 | Fairleigh Dickinson |
| 6 | Chicago State |
| 7 | Saint Francis |
| 8 | Wagner |
| 9 | Le Moyne |
| 10 | New Haven |
(*) Unanimous selection

=== Preseason All-NEC Team ===
Preseason All-NEC Team
| Player | Position | Class |
|---|---|---|
| Darin Smith Jr. | Forward | Sophomore |

== Roster ==
2025–26 Central Connecticut Blue Devils men's basketball team
Players
Coaches

| Pos. | # | Name | Height | Weight | Year | Previous school | Hometown |
|---|---|---|---|---|---|---|---|
| G | 0 | Elijah Parker | 6 ft 3 in (1.91 m) | 175 lb (79 kg) | Fr | St. Thomas More School | Waterbury, Connecticut |
| G | 1 | Jay Rodgers | 6 ft 3 in (1.91 m) | 185 lb (84 kg) | Sr | Cochise College | Pickerington, Ohio |
| F | 2 | Nico Ashley | 6 ft 7 in (2.01 m) | 180 lb (82 kg) | GS | Lees–McRae College | Elizabethton, Tennessee |
| G | 3 | Roddy Jones | 6 ft 1 in (1.85 m) | 195 lb (88 kg) | RS Fr | Cheshire Academy | North Babylon, New York |
| F | 5 | Darin Smith Jr. | 6 ft 7 in (2.01 m) | 210 lb (95 kg) | So | Vermont Academy | Springfield, Massachusetts |
| G | 6 | Melo Sanchez | 6 ft 4 in (1.93 m) | 185 lb (84 kg) | Sr | Arkansas | San Diego, California |
| G | 10 | Ja'Kobe Williams | 6 ft 3 in (1.91 m) | 190 lb (86 kg) | GS | Edward Waters | Jacksonville, Florida |
| F | 11 | Jayden Mott | 6 ft 8 in (2.03 m) | 210 lb (95 kg) | So | Northern Illinois | Midwest City, Oklahoma |
| G | 12 | Gabe Spinelli | 6 ft 3 in (1.91 m) | 195 lb (88 kg) | Sr | Chicago State | Watertown, Massachusetts |
| G | 13 | Ashton Reynolds | 6 ft 4 in (1.93 m) | 185 lb (84 kg) | Fr | Williston Northampton School | Brooklyn, New York |
| G/F | 15 | Adam Fox | 6 ft 5 in (1.96 m) | 185 lb (84 kg) | RS Fr | Brewster Academy | Silver Spring, Maryland |
| G | 20 | Corsley Edwards Jr. | 6 ft 2 in (1.88 m) | 188 lb (85 kg) | Fr | Milford Mill Academy | Baltimore, Maryland |
| F | 22 | Daniel James | 6 ft 8 in (2.03 m) | 215 lb (98 kg) | So | Portland Community College | Bologna, Italy |
| F | 23 | Rashawn Tibby | 6 ft 8 in (2.03 m) | 190 lb (86 kg) | Fr | South Kent School | East Hartford, Connecticut |
| G | 24 | James Jones | 6 ft 6 in (1.98 m) | 190 lb (86 kg) | So | Worcester Academy | New Britain, Connecticut |
| F | 34 | Max Frazier | 6 ft 9 in (2.06 m) | 200 lb (91 kg) | Jr | Siena | Pittsboro, North Carolina |

Head coach

- Patrick Sellers (Central Connecticut State)

Assistant coach(es)

- Ben Wood (Connecticut)
- Lenny Jefferson (Central Connecticut State)
- Ryan Olander (Fairfield)

Legend

- (C) Team captain
- (S) Suspended
- (I) Ineligible
- (W) Walk-on
- Injured
- Current redshirt

Roster
Last update: November 16, 2025

== Schedule and results ==
| Date time, TV | Rank^{#} | Opponent^{#} | Result | Record | Site (attendance) city, state |
Non-conference regular season
| November 3, 2025*; 7:00 pm, NECFR | | Vermont State–Johnson | W 117–55 | 1–0 | William H. Detrick Gymnasium (1,007); New Britain, CT |
| November 6, 2025*; 7:00 pm, ESPN+ | | at Quinnipiac | L 49–71 | 1–1 | M&T Bank Arena (2,581); Hamden, CT |
| November 11, 2025*; 7:00 pm, ACCNX | | at Boston College | W 60–59 | 2–1 | Conte Forum (3,774); Chestnut Hill, MA |
| November 16, 2025*; 2:00 pm, ESPN+ | | at UMass | L 77–84 | 2–2 | Mullins Center (2,743); Amherst, MA |
| November 21, 2025*; 6:30 pm, B1G+ | | at Rutgers | W 67–54 | 3–2 | Jersey Mike's Arena (8,000); Piscataway, NJ |
| November 24, 2025*; 7:00 pm, NECFR | | Sacred Heart | W 108–106 ^{OT} | 4–2 | William H. Detrick Gymnasium (2,067); New Britain, CT |
| November 30, 2025*; 1:00 pm, NECFR | | Johnson & Wales (RI) | W 122–57 | 5–2 | William H. Detrick Gymnasium (511); New Britain, CT |
| December 3, 2025*; 7:00 pm, ESPN+ | | at Seton Hall | L 61–77 | 5–3 | Walsh Gymnasium (1,219); South Orange, NJ |
| December 7, 2025*; 1:00 pm, FloCollege | | at Northeastern | L 56–73 | 5–4 | Cabot Center (653); Boston, MA |
| December 13, 2025*; 4:00 pm, ESPN+ | | at Binghamton | W 84–67 | 6–4 | Dr. Bai Lee Court (1,624); Vestal, NY |
| December 18, 2025*; 7:00 pm, NECFR | | Fairfield | L 70–84 | 6–5 | William H. Detrick Gymnasium (1,054); New Britain, CT |
NEC regular season
| January 2, 2026; 7:00 pm, NECFR | | at LIU | L 78–84 | 6–6 (0–1) | Steinberg Wellness Center (321); Brooklyn, NY |
| January 4, 2026; 1:00 pm, NECFR | | New Haven | W 72–61 | 7–6 (1–1) | William H. Detrick Gymnasium (1,118); New Britain, CT |
| January 8, 2026; 7:00 pm, NECFR | | Stonehill | W 76–69 | 8–6 (2–1) | William H. Detrick Gymnasium (761); New Britain, CT |
| January 10, 2026; 1:00 pm, NECFR | | at Le Moyne | W 69–59 | 9–6 (3–1) | Ted Grant Court (639); DeWitt, NY |
| January 17, 2026; 2:00 pm, NECFR | | at Saint Francis | W 98–90 | 10–6 (4–1) | DeGol Arena (768); Loretto, PA |
| January 19, 2026; 2:00 pm, NECFR | | at Mercyhurst | L 61–79 | 10–7 (4–2) | Owen McCormick Court (567); Erie, PA |
| January 23, 2026; 7:00 pm, NECFR | | Fairleigh Dickinson | L 66–76 | 10–8 (4–3) | William H. Detrick Gymnasium (1,045); New Britain, CT |
| January 25, 2026; 2:00 pm, NECFR | | at Stonehill | L 59–61 | 10–9 (4–4) | Merkert Gymnasium (328); Easton, MA |
| January 29, 2026; 7:30 pm, NECFR | | at Wagner | W 62–55 | 11–9 (5–4) | Spiro Sports Center (916); Staten Island, NY |
| January 31, 2026; 1:00 pm, ESPNU | | LIU | L 59–80 | 11–10 (5–5) | William H. Detrick Gymnasium (1,611); New Britain, CT |
| February 5, 2026; 7:00 pm, NECFR | | Chicago State | W 78–67 | 12–10 (6–5) | William H. Detrick Gymnasium (914); New Britain, CT |
| February 7, 2026; 1:00 pm, NECFR | | Wagner | W 84–67 | 13–10 (7–5) | William H. Detrick Gymnasium (732); New Britain, CT |
| February 12, 2026; 7:00 pm, NECFR | | at New Haven | W 81–76 | 14–10 (8–5) | Hazell Center (903); West Haven, CT |
| February 14, 2026; 2:00 pm, NECFR | | at Fairleigh Dickinson | W 63–57 | 15–10 (9–5) | Bogota Savings Bank Center (826); Hackensack, NJ |
| February 19, 2026; 7:00 pm, NECFR | | Le Moyne | W 78–77 | 16–10 (10–5) | William H. Detrick Gymnasium (904); New Britain, CT |
| February 21, 2026; 2:00 pm, NECFR | | at Chicago State | L 51–70 | 16–11 (10–6) | Jones Convocation Center (272); Chicago, IL |
| February 26, 2026; 7:00 pm, NECFR | | Mercyhurst | W 80–78 | 17–11 (11–6) | William H. Detrick Gymnasium (914); New Britain, CT |
| February 28, 2026; 1:00 pm, NECFR | | Saint Francis | W 69–64 | 18–11 (12–6) | William H. Detrick Gymnasium (1,018); New Britain, CT |
NEC tournament
| March 4, 2026; 7:00 pm, NEC Front Row | (2) | (7) Wagner; Quarterfinals | L 60–70 | 18–12 | William H. Detrick Gymnasium (2,105); New Britain, CT |
*Non-conference game. ^{#}Rankings from AP Poll. (#) Tournament seedings in parentheses. All times are in Eastern.
