= 2026 NEC men's basketball tournament =

American college basketball postseason tournament

- Classification: Division I
- Season: 2025–26
- Teams: 8
- Site: Campus sites
- Finals site: Steinberg Wellness Center; Brooklyn, New York
- Champions: LIU (7th title)
- Winning coach: Rod Strickland (1st title)
- MVP: Greg Gordon (LIU)
- Television: ESPN2, YES/NESN Nation/ESPN+, NEC Front Row
- NEC men's basketball tournaments

2025–26 NEC men's basketball standings
	Conf.				Overall
Team	W		L	PCT	W		L	PCT
LIU †	15	–	3	.833	24	–	11	.686
Central Connecticut	12	–	6	.667	18	–	12	.600
Mercyhurst *	10	–	8	.556	17	–	17	.500
Le Moyne *	10	–	8	.556	15	–	17	.469
New Haven **	9	–	9	.500	14	–	17	.452
Stonehill	8	–	10	.444	12	–	21	.364
Fairleigh Dickinson	8	–	10	.444	11	–	21	.344
Wagner	8	–	10	.444	14	–	17	.452
Chicago State	5	–	13	.278	7	–	25	.219
Saint Francis	5	–	13	.278	7	–	24	.226
† 2026 NEC tournament winner * ineligible for the 2026 NCAA tournament due to transition from Division II ** ineligible for both the 2026 NEC tournament and the 2026 NCAA tournament due to transition from Division II

The 2026 NEC Men's Basketball Tournament was the postseason men's basketball tournament for the NEC for the 2025–26 NCAA Division I men's basketball season. The tournament took place over three dates between March 4 and 10, 2026, and all tournament games were played in the home arenas of the higher-seeded school. The winner, LIU, received the conference's automatic bid to the 2026 NCAA tournament.

This was also the first men's tournament held under the "NEC" name. On October 2, 2025, the conference changed its name from the Northeast Conference to its longstanding initialism of NEC.

== Seeds ==
Eight of the conference's ten teams qualified for the tournament. Teams were seeded by record within the conference, with a tiebreaker system to seed teams with identical conference records.

NOTE: New Haven was ineligible for this tournament due to its transition from NCAA Division II.

Seed	School	Conference Record	Tiebreaker 1	Tiebreaker 2
1	LIU	15–3		
2	Central Connecticut	12–6		
3	Mercyhurst	10–8	1–1 vs. Central Connecticut	
4	Le Moyne	10–8	0–2 vs. Central Connecticut	
Inel	New Haven	9–9		
5	Stonehill	8–10	1–1 vs. Central Connecticut	3–1 vs. Mercyhurst/Le Moyne
6	Fairleigh Dickinson	8–10	1–1 vs. Central Connecticut	2–2 vs. Mercyhurst/Le Moyne
7	Wagner	8–10	0–2 vs. Central Connecticut	
8	Chicago State	5–13	1–1 vs. Central Connecticut	
DNQ	Saint Francis	5–13	0–2 vs. Central Connecticut	

== Schedule ==
Game	Time *	Matchup	Score	Attendance	Television
Quarterfinals – Wednesday, March 4
1	7:00 p.m.	No. 8 Chicago State at No. 1 LIU	75–79	886	NEC Front Row
2	7:00 p.m.	No. 7 Wagner at No. 2 Central Connecticut	70–60	2,105	NEC Front Row
3	7:00 p.m.	No. 6 Fairleigh Dickinson at No. 3 Mercyhurst	61–70	1,027	NEC Front Row
4	7:00 p.m.	No. 5 Stonehill at No. 4 Le Moyne	81–71	781	NEC Front Row
Semifinals – Saturday, March 7
5	12:00 p.m.	No. 5 Stonehill at No. 3 Mercyhurst	51–56	567	YES/NESN Nation/ESPN+
6	2:00 p.m.	No. 7 Wagner at No. 1 LIU	56–64	1,028	YES/NESN Nation/ESPN+
Final – Tuesday, March 10
7	7:00 p.m.	No. 3 Mercyhurst at No. 1 LIU	70–79	1,562	ESPN2
* Game times in ET; rankings denotes tournament seed

== Bracket ==
Teams will be reseeded after each round with highest remaining seeds receiving home-court advantage.

Quarterfinals; March 4 NEC Front Row
1	LIU	79
8	Chicago State	75
2	Central Connecticut	60
7	Wagner	70
Pairings are reseeded after the quarterfinals.
3	Mercyhurst	70
6	Fairleigh Dickinson	61
4	Le Moyne	71
5	Stonehill	81

Semifinals; March 7 YES/NESN Nation/ESPN+
1	LIU	64
7	Wagner	56
3	Mercyhurst	56
5	Stonehill	51

Final; March 10; ESPN2
1	LIU	79
3	Mercyhurst	70

== Game summaries ==
NOTE: all times are in Eastern Standard Time (UTC−5) for Quarterfinal and Semifinal rounds; Eastern Daylight Time (UTC-4) for Final round

=== Quarterfinal Round ===
NEC Front Row

March 4
7:00 p.m. EST

Box Score

No. 1 LIU 79, No. 8 Chicago State 75
Scoring by half: 40–33, 39–42
Pts: 21 – Porter-Brown; Rebs: 7 – Gordon; Asts: 6 – Davis	Pts: 22 – Byard; Rebs: 12 – Byard; Asts: 5 – Ray
Game 1

Steinberg Wellness Center
Brooklyn, New York
Attendance: 886
Referees: Moyer, Ruppenthal, Stallworth

NEC Front Row

March 4
7:00 p.m.

Box Score

No. 2 Central Connecticut 60, No. 7 Wagner 70
Scoring by half: 35–31, 25–39
Pts: 29 – Smith Jr. Rebs: 13 – Smith Jr. Asts: 2 – Tied (2)	Pts: 18 – Awoke; Rebs: 8 – Basil; Asts: 3 – Awoke
Game 2

William H. Detrick Gymnasium
New Britain, Connecticut
Attendance: 2,105
Referees: Ba, Deneen, McCloskey

NEC Front Row

March 4
7:00 p.m.

Box Score

No. 3 Mercyhurst 70, No. 6 Fairleigh Dickinson 61
Scoring by half: 35–28, 35–33
Pts: 20 – Tied (2); Rebs: 7 – Blunt; Asts: 4 – Tied (2)	Pts: 15 – Cox; Rebs: 9 – Jackson; Asts: 3 – Cox
Game 3

Mercyhurst Athletic Center
Erie, Pennsylvania
Attendance: 1,027
Referees: Caswell, Crum, Mooney

NEC Front Row

March 4
7:00 p.m.

Box Score

No. 4 Le Moyne 71, No. 5 Stonehill 81
Scoring by half: 32–39, 39–42
Pts: 15 – Rainwater; Rebs: 10 – Tied (2); Asts: 3 – Tied (3)	Pts: 26 – Hackett; Rebs: 8 – Koffi; Asts: 7 – Sunderland
Game 4

Merkert Gymnasium
Easton, Massachusetts
Attendance: 781
Referees: Burton, Corbett Jr., Mallios

=== Semifinal Round ===
YES/
NESN Nation/
ESPN+

March 7
12:00 p.m. EST

Box Score

No. 3 Mercyhurst 56, No. 5 Stonehill 51
Scoring by half: 23–19, 33–32
Pts: 17 – Johnson; Rebs: 9 – Martin; Asts: 3 – Tied (2)	Pts: 21 – Hackett; Rebs: 8 – Tutic; Asts: 2 – Koffi
Game 5

Mercyhurst Athletic Center
Erie, Pennsylvania
Attendance: 567
Referees: Barley, Downs, Tuomey

YES/
NESN Nation/
ESPN+

March 7
2:00 p.m.

Box Score

No. 1 LIU 64, No. 7 Wagner 56
Scoring by half: 23–23, 41–33
Pts: 19 – Gordon; Rebs: 13 – Lasu; Asts: 3 – Gordon	Pts: 27 – Jones; Rebs: 9 – Basil; Asts: 3 – Basil
Game 6

Steinberg Wellness Center
Brooklyn, New York
Attendance: 1,028
Referees: Pagano, Powell, Sallustio Jr.

=== Final Round ===
ESPN2

March 10
7:00 p.m. EDT

Box Score

No. 1 LIU 79, No. 3 Mercyhurst 70
Scoring by half: 42–40, 37–30
Pts: 24 – Tied (2); Rebs: 13 – Fuller; Asts: 5 – Fuller	Pts: 26 – Blunt; Rebs: 14 – Martin; Asts: 8 – Lemelman
Championship

Steinberg Wellness Center
Brooklyn, New York
Attendance: 1,562
Referees: Corbett Jr., Cruz, Kitts

== Awards and honors ==
All-Tournament Team

Player	Team
Bernie Blunt III	Mercyhurst
Malachi Davis	LIU
Greg Gordon (MVP)	LIU
Davante Hackett	Stonehill
Quadir Martin	Mercyhurst

MVP denotes Most Valuable Player

== Statistics ==
Source:

== Tournament highlights ==
=== Final ===
LIU was guaranteed the NEC bid regardless of the outcome as Mercyhurst was ineligible for the NCAA tournament due to being in transition from Division II.
