= 2025–26 LIU Sharks men's basketball team =

American college basketball season

2025–26 LIU Sharks men's basketball

NEC regular season and tournament champions

NCAA tournament, First round
- Conference: Northeast Conference
- Record: 24–11 (15–3 NEC)
- Head coach: Rod Strickland (4th season)
- Assistant coaches: Brionne Gillion; Jamere Dismukes; Baronton Terry; Dalmar Ali
- Home arena: Steinberg Wellness Center

2025–26 NEC men's basketball standings
	Conf.				Overall
Team	W		L	PCT	W		L	PCT
LIU †	15	–	3	.833	24	–	11	.686
Central Connecticut	12	–	6	.667	18	–	12	.600
Mercyhurst *	10	–	8	.556	17	–	17	.500
Le Moyne *	10	–	8	.556	15	–	17	.469
New Haven **	9	–	9	.500	14	–	17	.452
Stonehill	8	–	10	.444	12	–	21	.364
Fairleigh Dickinson	8	–	10	.444	11	–	21	.344
Wagner	8	–	10	.444	14	–	17	.452
Chicago State	5	–	13	.278	7	–	25	.219
Saint Francis	5	–	13	.278	7	–	24	.226
† 2026 NEC tournament winner * ineligible for the 2026 NCAA tournament due to transition from Division II ** ineligible for both the 2026 NEC tournament and the 2026 NCAA tournament due to transition from Division II

The 2025–26 LIU Sharks men's basketball team represented Long Island University in the 2025–26 NCAA Division I men's basketball season. The Sharks, led by fourth-year head coach Rod Strickland, played their home games at the Steinberg Wellness Center in Brooklyn as members of the Northeast Conference. For the first time since 2018 and first time since the campus merger, the Sharks made the NCAA Tournament.

== Previous season ==
The Sharks finished the 2024–25 season 17–16, 12–4 in NEC play, to finish in second place. As the No. 2 seed, they defeated Chicago State in the quarterfinals, before losing to Saint Francis, the eventual conference tournament champions, in the semifinals.

== Preseason polls ==
=== NEC poll ===
The NEC released its preseason coaches poll on October 27, 2025. The Sharks were unanimously picked to finish first in the conference.

Rank	Team
1	LIU (unanimous)
2	Central Connecticut
3	Stonehill
4	Mercyhurst
5	Fairleigh Dickinson
6	Chicago State
7	Saint Francis
8	Wagner
9	Le Moyne
10	New Haven

() first-place votes

=== Preseason all-conference team ===
Redshirt senior guard Malachi Davis and graduate student swingman Jamal Fuller were selected as members of the NEC Preseason All-Conference Team.

== Roster ==
2025–26 LIU Sharks men's basketball team
Players
Coaches

Pos.	#	Name	Height	Weight	Year	Previous school	Hometown
G	0	Malachi Davis	6 ft 4 in (1.93 m)	172 lb (78 kg)	RS Sr	Central Tech	Scarborough, Ontario, Canada
G	1	Jomo Goings	6 ft 5 in (1.96 m)	180 lb (82 kg)	Jr	Winston Churchill HS/Slippery Rock	Washington, D.C.
G	2	Greg Gordon	6 ft 5 in (1.96 m)	210 lb (95 kg)	Sr	Lincoln Park HS (IL)/UAB	Chicago, IL
G	3	Faheim Meran	6 ft 6 in (1.98 m)	187 lb (85 kg)	Jr	West Oaks Academy/Miami Dade College	Miami, FL
G/F	4	Tre'shawn Sheppard	6 ft 6 in (1.98 m)	230 lb (104 kg)	RS So	Eagle Academy for Young Men II	Brooklyn, NY
G	5	Max Ndlovu-Fraser	6 ft 5 in (1.96 m)	191 lb (87 kg)	Fr	Western Canada Prep	North Vancouver, British Columbia, Canada
F	6	Mason Porter-Brown	6 ft 6 in (1.98 m)	200 lb (91 kg)	Jr	William T. Dwyer HS	Gainesville, FL
F	7	Isaiah Miranda	7 ft 1 in (2.16 m)	230 lb (104 kg)	Jr	Southern California Academy/Green Bay	Pawtucket, RI
G	10	A.J. Neal Jr.	6 ft 2 in (1.88 m)	195 lb (88 kg)	Sr	West Oaks Academy/Chicago State	Orlando, FL
G	14	Eddie Munyak	6 ft 1 in (1.85 m)	175 lb (79 kg)	So	Eagle Academy for Young Men II	Huntington, NY
F	22	Shadrak Lasu	6 ft 8 in (2.03 m)	200 lb (91 kg)	So	Northstar Prep	Winnipeg, Manitoba, Canada
G	24	Gavin Pendergast	6 ft 4 in (1.93 m)	185 lb (84 kg)	So	South St. Paul Secondary	Cold Spring, MN
G/F	33	Jamal Fuller	6 ft 5 in (1.96 m)	215 lb (98 kg)	GS	Central Technical School	Toronto, Ontario, Canada
F	34	Xinyi Li	6 ft 9 in (2.06 m)	235 lb (107 kg)	Jr	St. John Bosco HS/Manhattan	Beijing, China

Head coach

- Rod Strickland (DePaul)

Assistant coach(es)

- Brionne Gillion
- Jamere Dismukes (Grand Canyon)
- Baronton Terry (Florida Memorial)
- Dalmar Ali (Laurentian)

Legend

- (C) Team captain
- (S) Suspended
- (I) Ineligible
- (W) Walk-on
- Injured
- Current redshirt

Roster
Last update: September 13, 2025

== Schedule and results ==
Date time, TV	Rank^{#}	Opponent^{#}	Result	Record	Site (attendance) city, state
Exhibition
October 30, 2025*; 4:00 p.m., NECFR		Roberts Wesleyan	W 83–65		Steinberg Wellness Center (280); Brooklyn, NY
Non-conference regular season
November 3, 2025*; 7:00 p.m., ACCNX		at Notre Dame	L 67–89	0–1	Joyce Center (3,911); Notre Dame, IN
November 6, 2025*; 6:30 p.m., ESPN+		at IU Indy	W 94–90	1–1	The Jungle (768); Indianapolis, IN
November 11, 2025*; 4:00 p.m., MWN		at Air Force	W 76–72	2–1	Clune Arena (1,089); USAF Academy, CO
November 15, 2025*; 7:00 p.m., NECFR		James Madison	W 88–79	3–1	Steinberg Wellness Center (626); Brooklyn, NY
November 20, 2025*; 7:00 p.m., ESPN+		at Fordham	L 53–69	3–2	Rose Hill Gymnasium (1,020); The Bronx, NY
November 22, 2025*; 2:00 p.m., B1G+		at No. 8 Illinois; Illinois Showcase	L 58–98	3–3	State Farm Center (12,625); Champaign, IL
November 24, 2025*; 7:00 p.m., ESPN+		at Missouri State; Illinois Showcase	W 75–61	4–3	Great Southern Bank Arena (1,601); Springfield, MO
December 2, 2025*; 7:30 p.m., NECFR		Winthrop	L 92–94 ^{OT}	4–4	Steinberg Wellness Center (403); Brooklyn, NY
December 6, 2025*; 2:00 p.m., ESPN+		at Lehigh	W 87–82	5–4	Stabler Arena (435); Bethlehem, PA
December 13, 2025*; 4:00 p.m., NECFR		La Salle	W 70–60	6–4	Steinberg Wellness Center (613); Brooklyn, NY
December 16, 2025*; 7:30 p.m., SECN+		at Mississippi State	L 83–87	6–5	Humphrey Coliseum (6,186); Starkville, MS
December 20, 2025*; 5:00 p.m., ESPN+		at FIU	L 79–86	6–6	Ocean Bank Convocation Center (301); Miami, FL
December 29, 2025*; 7:00 p.m., SECN+		at No. 23 Georgia	L 74–89	6–7	Stegeman Coliseum (7,541); Athens, GA
NEC regular season
January 2, 2026; 7:00 p.m., NECFR		Central Connecticut	W 84–78	7–7 (1–0)	Steinberg Wellness Center (321); Brooklyn, NY
January 4, 2026; 2:00 p.m., NECFR		at Chicago State	W 74–55	8–7 (2–0)	Jones Convocation Center (272); Chicago, IL
January 8, 2026; 7:00 p.m., NECFR		Mercyhurst	W 60–58	9–7 (3–0)	Steinberg Wellness Center (324); Brooklyn, NY
January 10, 2026; 4:00 p.m., NECFR		Saint Francis	W 67–63	10–7 (4–0)	Steinberg Wellness Center (224); Brooklyn, NY
January 17, 2026; 7:30 p.m., NECFR		at Fairleigh Dickinson	W 66–59	11–7 (5–0)	Bogota Savings Bank Center (425); Hackensack, NJ
January 19, 2026; 7:00 p.m., NECFR		at Le Moyne	L 77–83	11–8 (5–1)	Ted Grant Court (587); DeWitt, NY
January 23, 2026; 7:00 p.m., NECFR		at Stonehill	W 66–63	12–8 (6–1)	Merkert Gymnasium (801); Easton, MA
January 29, 2026; 7:00 p.m., NECFR		Le Moyne	W 83–61	13–8 (7–1)	Steinberg Wellness Center (433); Brooklyn, NY
January 31, 2026; 1:00 p.m., ESPNU		at Central Connecticut	W 80–59	14–8 (8–1)	William H. Detrick Gymnasium (1,611); New Britain, CT
February 5, 2026; 7:00 p.m., NECFR		New Haven	W 60–55	15–8 (9–1)	Steinberg Wellness Center (296); Brooklyn, NY
February 7, 2026; 4:00 p.m., NECFR		Stonehill	W 61–54	16–8 (10–1)	Steinberg Wellness Center (321); Brooklyn, NY
February 12, 2026; 7:00 p.m., NECFR		at Wagner	W 67–57	17–8 (11–1)	Spiro Sports Center (743); Staten Island, NY
February 14, 2026; 1:00 p.m., NECFR		at New Haven	L 52–55	17–9 (11–2)	Jeffrey P. Hazell Athletics Center (667); West Haven, CT
February 16, 2026; 7:00 p.m., NECFR		Wagner; Postponed from Jan. 25 due to winter storm	W 83–65	18–9 (12–2)	Steinberg Wellness Center (578); Brooklyn, NY
February 19, 2026; 7:00 p.m., NECFR		at Saint Francis	W 91–89	19–9 (13–2)	DeGol Arena (771); Loretto, PA
February 21, 2026; 2:00 p.m., NECFR		at Mercyhurst	L 83–91	19–10 (13–3)	Owen McCormick Court (956); Erie, PA
February 26, 2026; 7:00 p.m., ESPN+		Chicago State	W 73–56	20–10 (14–3)	Steinberg Wellness Center; Brooklyn, NY
February 28, 2026; 1:00 p.m., NECFR		Fairleigh Dickinson	W 74–60	21–10 (15–3)	Steinberg Wellness Center (801); Brooklyn, NY
NEC tournament
March 4, 2026; 7:00 p.m., NECFR	(1)	(8) Chicago State; Quarterfinal	W 79–75	22–10	Steinberg Wellness Center (886); Brooklyn, NY
March 7, 2026; 2:00 p.m., ESPN+	(1)	(7) Wagner; Semifinal	W 64–56	23–10	Steinberg Wellness Center (1,028); Brooklyn, NY
March 10, 2026; 7:00 p.m., ESPN2	(1)	(3) Mercyhurst; Championship	W 79–70	24–10	Steinberg Wellness Center (1,562); Brooklyn, NY
NCAA tournament
March 20, 2026; 1:35 p.m., TNT	(16 W)	(1 W) No. 2 Arizona; First round	L 58–92	24–11	Viejas Arena (11,418); San Diego, CA
*Non-conference game. ^{#}Rankings from AP poll. (#) Tournament seedings in parentheses. W=West. All times are in Eastern.
