= 2025–26 Stonehill Skyhawks men's basketball team =

American college basketball season

2025–26 Stonehill Skyhawks men's basketball
- Conference: Northeast Conference
- Record: 12–21 (8–10 NEC)
- Head coach: Chris Kraus (13th season)
- Assistant coaches: Tom Bonacum; Josh Einhorn; Aaron Loredo; Bill Herrion
- Home arena: Merkert Gymnasium

2025–26 NEC men's basketball standings
	Conf.				Overall
Team	W		L	PCT	W		L	PCT
LIU	15	–	3	.833	22	–	10	.688
Central Connecticut	12	–	6	.667	18	–	12	.600
Mercyhurst *	10	–	8	.556	16	–	16	.500
Le Moyne *	10	–	8	.556	15	–	17	.469
New Haven **	9	–	9	.500	14	–	17	.452
Stonehill	8	–	10	.444	12	–	20	.375
Fairleigh Dickinson	8	–	10	.444	11	–	21	.344
Wagner	8	–	10	.444	14	–	16	.467
Chicago State	5	–	13	.278	7	–	25	.219
Saint Francis	5	–	13	.278	7	–	24	.226
† 2026 NEC tournament winner * ineligible for the 2026 NCAA tournament due to transition from Division II ** ineligible for both the 2026 NEC tournament and the 2026 NCAA tournament due to transition from Division II; As of March 4, 2026

The 2025–26 Stonehill Skyhawks men's basketball team represented Stonehill College during the 2025–26 NCAA Division I men's basketball season. The Skyhawks, led by 13th-year head coach Chris Kraus, played their home games at Merkert Gymnasium in Easton, Massachusetts as members of the Northeast Conference.

== Previous season ==
The Skyhawks finished the 2024–25 season 15–17, 7–9 in NEC play, to finish in sixth place. They were defeated by Fairleigh Dickinson in the quarterfinals of the NEC tournament.

== Preseason ==
On October 27, 2025, the NEC released their preseason coaches poll. Stonehill was picked to finish third in the conference.

=== Preseason rankings ===
NEC Preseason Poll
Place	Team
1	LIU*
2	Central Connecticut
3	Stonehill
4	Mercyhurst
5	Fairleigh Dickinson
6	Chicago State
7	Saint Francis
8	Wagner
9	Le Moyne
10	New Haven
(*) Unanimous selection

=== Preseason All-NEC Team ===
Preseason All-NEC Team
Player	Position	Class
Hermann Koffi	Guard	Sophomore

== Roster ==
2025–26 Stonehill Skyhawks men's basketball team
Players
Coaches

Pos.	#	Name	Height	Weight	Year	Previous school	Hometown
G	1	Rex Sunderland	6 ft 5 in (1.96 m)	198 lb (90 kg)	Sr	New Hampshire	Kaysville, Utah
G	2	Trenton Ruth	6 ft 3 in (1.91 m)	185 lb (84 kg)	So	Coffeyville Community College	Detroit, Michigan
G	3	William Batchelder	6 ft 2 in (1.88 m)	180 lb (82 kg)	Sr	Holy Cross	Newburyport, Massachusetts
G	4	Davante Hackett	6 ft 3 in (1.91 m)	180 lb (82 kg)	Jr	Brock	Brampton, Ontario
G	5	Chas Stinson	6 ft 4 in (1.93 m)	195 lb (88 kg)	Sr	Hickory Grove Christian School	Charlotte, North Carolina
G	10	Hermann Koffi	6 ft 4 in (1.93 m)	203 lb (92 kg)	So	Polyvalente de Thetford Mines	Quebec City, Quebec
F/C	11	Ridvan Tutic	6 ft 11 in (2.11 m)	245 lb (111 kg)	Jr	Maine	Novi Pazar, Serbia
G	12	Eino Montin	6 ft 1 in (1.85 m)	180 lb (82 kg)	Jr	Temple College	Oulu, Finland
F	13	Raymond Espinal-Guzman	6 ft 8 in (2.03 m)	220 lb (100 kg)	GS	Sacred Heart	Cranston, Rhode Island
G/F	15	Norbu Jenpa	6 ft 4 in (1.93 m)	180 lb (82 kg)	Fr	Prior Lake High School	Prior Lake, Minnesota
F	20	Cory Lovell	6 ft 9 in (2.06 m)	209 lb (95 kg)	Jr	Harcum College	Wellington, New Zealand
G	21	Colin Byrne	6 ft 3 in (1.91 m)	170 lb (77 kg)	Fr	Middletown High School North	Middletown, New Jersey
G	22	Charlie Diamantis	6 ft 3 in (1.91 m)	190 lb (86 kg)	Sr	Joseph A. Foran High School	Milford, Connecticut
G	30	Anthony Holden	6 ft 5 in (1.96 m)	185 lb (84 kg)	GS	Maryville	Lee's Summit, Missouri
F	31	Pearse McGuinn	6 ft 8 in (2.03 m)	205 lb (93 kg)	So	Cardinal O'Hara High School	Havertown, Pennsylvania
F	33	Ethan Meuser	6 ft 8 in (2.03 m)	205 lb (93 kg)	Sr	The Hill School	Shavertown, Pennsylvania

Head coach

- Chris Kraus (Stonehill)

Assistant coach(es)

- Tom Bonacum (Ramapo)
- Josh Einhorn (Pittsburgh)
- Aaron Loredo (Salem State)
- Bill Herrion (Merrimack)

Legend

- (C) Team captain
- (S) Suspended
- (I) Ineligible
- (W) Walk-on
- Injured
- Current redshirt

Roster
Last update: November 16, 2025

== Schedule and results ==
Date time, TV	Rank^{#}	Opponent^{#}	Result	Record	High points	High rebounds	High assists	Site (attendance) city, state
Non-conference regular season
November 3, 2025*; 5:00 pm, NECFR		Thomas	W 100–48	1–0	19 – McGuinn	9 – tied	5 – Ruth	Merkert Gymnasium (318); Easton, MA
November 7, 2025*; 8:00 pm, ESPN+		at DePaul	L 64–72	1–1	27 – Koffi	10 – Espinal-Guzman	7 – Espinal-Guzman	Wintrust Arena (3,162); Chicago, IL
November 11, 2025*; 7:00 pm, ESPN+		at Rhode Island	L 57–80	1–2	16 – Koffi	9 – Espinal-Guzman	4 – Sunderland	Ryan Center (3,451); Kingston, RI
November 14, 2025*; 7:00 pm, ESPN+		at Fairfield; Mahoney Classic	L 71−73 ^{OT}	1−3	19 – Espinal-Guzman	12 – Espinal-Guzman	6 – Sunderland	Leo D. Mahoney Arena (2,151); Fairfield, CT
November 15, 2025*; 2:00 pm, ESPN+		vs. Loyola (MD); Mahoney Classic	L 63−74	1−4	21 – Koffi	7 – tied	4 – Sunderland	Leo D. Mahoney Arena (202); Fairfield, CT
November 17, 2025*; 8:00 pm, ESPN+		at No. 16 Iowa State	L 57–96	1–5	16 – Koffi	5 – Tutic	5 – Ruth	Hilton Coliseum (13,416); Ames, IA
November 21, 2025*; 6:00 pm, NECFR		Lafayette	W 74–70	2–5	23 – Hackett	9 – Stinson	5 – Ruth	Merkert Gymnasium (450); Easton, MA
November 26, 2025*; 12:00 pm, NECFR		UMass Lowell	L 64–75	2–6	15 – Tied	10 – Tutic	2 – Tied	Merkert Gymnasium (171); Easton, MA
November 30, 2025*; 2:00 pm, ESPN+		at Quinnipiac	L 62–76	2–7	17 – Espinal-Guzman	11 – Stinson	5 – Stinson	M&T Bank Arena (869); Hamden, CT
December 2, 2025*; 6:00 pm, ESPN+		at Bryant	L 65–77	2–8	16 – Hackett	8 – Espinal-Guzman	4 – Sunderland	Chace Athletic Center (300); Smithfield, RI
December 12, 2025*; 7:00 pm, NECFR		Vermont State–Johnson	W 101–60	3–8	19 – Koffi	11 – Tutic	6 – Ruth	Merkert Gymnasium (101); Easton, MA
December 17, 2025*; 6:00 pm, ESPN+		at New Hampshire	L 58–59	3–9	21 – Tutic	10 – Tutic	3 – Espinal-Guzman	Lundholm Gym (297); Durham, NH
December 22, 2025*; 7:00 pm, ACCNX		at Syracuse	L 48–77	3–10	12 – Hackett	9 – Tutic	3 – Tied	JMA Wireless Dome (12,742); Syracuse, NY
NEC regular season
January 2, 2026; 7:00 pm, NECFR		New Haven	L 55–70	3–11 (0–1)	14 – Stinson	10 – Tutic	3 – Tied	Merkert Gymnasium (116); Easton, MA
January 4, 2026; 4:00 pm, NECFR		at Wagner	W 69–60	4–11 (1–1)	20 – Hackett	11 – Tutic	6 – Sunderland	Spiro Sports Center (742); Staten Island, NY
January 8, 2026; 7:00 pm, NECFR		at Central Connecticut	L 69–76	4–12 (1–2)	19 – Hackett	10 – Espinal-Guzman	5 – Sunderland	William H. Detrick Gymnasium (761); New Britain, CT
January 10, 2026; 2:00 pm, NECFR		Chicago State	W 85–82 ^{OT}	5–12 (2–2)	22 – Hackett	13 – Tutic	6 – Sunderland	Merkert Gymnasium (137); Easton, MA
January 17, 2026; 2:00 pm, NECFR		at Mercyhurst	W 62–57 ^{OT}	6–12 (3–2)	15 – Stinson	10 – Tied	7 – Meuser	Owen McCormick Court (956); Erie, PA
January 19, 2026; 12:00 pm, NECFR		at Saint Francis	L 61–63	6–13 (3–3)	19 – Stinson	9 – Tutic	2 – Tied	DeGol Arena (674); Loretto, PA
January 23, 2026; 7:00 pm, NECFR		LIU	L 63–66	6–14 (3–4)	20 – Stinson	10 – Tutic	4 – Hackett	Merkert Gymnasium (801); Easton, MA
January 26, 2026; 7:00 pm, NECFR		Central Connecticut	W 61–59	7–14 (4–4)	12 – Tied	7 – Tutic	4 – Sunderland	Merkert Gymnasium (328); Easton, MA
January 29, 2026; 7:00 pm, NECFR		Fairleigh Dickinson	W 58–57	8–14 (5–4)	21 – Koffi	10 – Tutic	4 – Sunderland	Merkert Gymnasium (326); Easton, MA
January 31, 2026; 1:00 pm, NECFR		at Le Moyne	W 65–54	9–14 (6–4)	22 – Hackett	15 – Hackett	4 – Sunderland	Ted Grant Court (445); DeWitt, NY
February 5, 2026; 7:00 pm, NECFR		at Fairleigh Dickinson	L 58–74	9–15 (6–5)	13 – Stinson	7 – Tutic	1 – Tied	Bogota Savings Bank Center (190); Hackensack, NJ
February 7, 2026; 4:00 pm, NECFR		at LIU	L 54–61	9–16 (6–6)	10 – Hackett	10 – Tutic	3 – Stinson	Steinberg Wellness Center (321); Brooklyn, NY
February 12, 2026; 6:00 pm, NECFR		at Chicago State	L 55–68	9–17 (6–7)	15 – Koffi	6 – Meuser	5 – Sunderland	Jones Convocation Center (183); Chicago, IL
February 14, 2026; 2:00 pm, NECFR		Wagner	L 57–68	9–18 (6–8)	18 – Stinson	7 – Tutic	2 – Tied	Merkert Gymnasium (260); Easton, MA
February 19, 2026; 6:00 pm, NECFR		at New Haven	L 51–64	9–19 (6–9)	13 – Stinson	12 – Stinson	2 – Tied	Hazell Center (776); West Haven, CT
February 21, 2026; 2:00 pm, NECFR		Le Moyne	W 77–68	10–19 (7–9)	30 – Hackett	9 – Stinson	3 – Sunderland	Merkert Gymnasium (485); Easton, MA
February 26, 2026; 7:00 pm, NECFR		Saint Francis	W 103–77	11–19 (8–9)	40 – Hackett	10 – Stinson	5 – Sunderland	Merkert Gymnasium (307); Easton, MA
February 28, 2026; 2:00 pm, NECFR		Mercyhurst	L 72–75 ^{OT}	11–20 (8–10)	21 – Stinson	15 – Tutic	5 – Sunderland	Merkert Gymnasium (415); Easton, MA
NEC tournament
March 4, 2026; 7:00 pm, NECFR	(5)	at (4) Le Moyne; Quarterfinals	W 81–71	12–20	26 – Hackett	8 – Koffi	7 – Sunderland	Ted Grant Court (781); DeWitt, NY
March 7, 2026; 2:00 pm, NECFR	(5)	at (3) Mercyhurst; Semifinals	L 51–56	12–21	21 – Hackett	8 – Tutic	2 – Koffi	Owen McCormick Court (567); Erie, PA
*Non-conference game. ^{#}Rankings from AP Poll. (#) Tournament seedings in parentheses. All times are in Eastern.
