= 2025–26 Chicago State Cougars men's basketball team =

American college basketball season

2025–26 Chicago State Cougars men's basketball
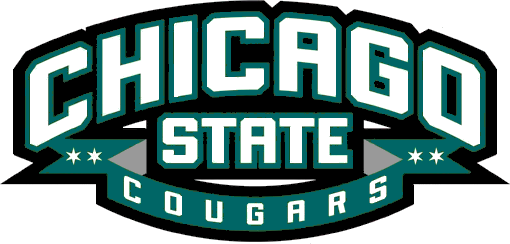
- Conference: Northeast Conference
- Record: 7–25 (5–13 NEC)
- Head coach: Landon Bussie (1st season)
- Assistant coaches: Ben Mandelbaum; Torrence Johnson; Adam Schwartz
- Home arena: Jones Convocation Center

2025–26 NEC men's basketball standings
	Conf.				Overall
Team	W		L	PCT	W		L	PCT
LIU †	15	–	3	.833	24	–	11	.686
Central Connecticut	12	–	6	.667	18	–	12	.600
Mercyhurst *	10	–	8	.556	17	–	17	.500
Le Moyne *	10	–	8	.556	15	–	17	.469
New Haven **	9	–	9	.500	14	–	17	.452
Stonehill	8	–	10	.444	12	–	21	.364
Fairleigh Dickinson	8	–	10	.444	11	–	21	.344
Wagner	8	–	10	.444	14	–	17	.452
Chicago State	5	–	13	.278	7	–	25	.219
Saint Francis	5	–	13	.278	7	–	24	.226
† 2026 NEC tournament winner * ineligible for the 2026 NCAA tournament due to transition from Division II ** ineligible for both the 2026 NEC tournament and the 2026 NCAA tournament due to transition from Division II

The 2025–26 Chicago State Cougars men's basketball team represented Chicago State University during the 2025–26 NCAA Division I men's basketball season. The Cougars, led by first-year head coach Landon Bussie, played their home games at the Jones Convocation Center in Chicago, Illinois as second-year members of the Northeast Conference (NEC).

The Cougars finished the season 7–25, 5–13 in NEC play, to finish in a tie for ninth (last) place. They were defeated by LIU in the NEC tournament for the second consecutive year.

== Previous season ==
The Cougars finished the 2024–25 season 4–28, 4–12 in NEC play, to finish in a tie for eighth (last) place. They were defeated by LIU in the NEC tournament.

On March 7, 2025, the school announced that they would be firing head coach Scott Spinelli, after just one season at the helm. On March 20, the school announced that they would be hiring Alcorn State head coach Landon Bussie as the team's new head coach.

== Preseason ==
On October 27, 2025, the NEC released their preseason coaches poll. Chicago State was picked to finish sixth in the conference.

=== Preseason rankings ===
NEC preseason poll
Place	Team
1	LIU*
2	Central Connecticut
3	Stonehill
4	Mercyhurst
5	Fairleigh Dickinson
6	Chicago State
7	Saint Francis
8	Wagner
9	Le Moyne
10	New Haven
(*) Unanimous selection

=== Preseason All-NEC Team ===
No players were named to the All-NEC Preseason Team.

== Roster ==
2025–26 Chicago State Cougars men's basketball team
Players
Coaches

Pos.	#	Name	Height	Weight	Year	Previous school	Hometown
G	0	Greg Spate	6 ft 7 in (2.01 m)	190 lb (86 kg)	Jr	West Oaks Academy	Lauderhill, FL
G	1	Deshawn Jean-Charles	6 ft 7 in (2.01 m)	200 lb (91 kg)	Sr	Miramar High School	Miami, FL
G	3	Doyel III Cockrill	6 ft 2 in (1.88 m)	196 lb (89 kg)	Jr	Fisk	Nashville, TN
G	4	Marcus Tankersley	6 ft 5 in (1.96 m)	195 lb (88 kg)	Sr	Alcorn State	Chattanooga, TN
G	5	Chauncey Gibson	6 ft 7 in (2.01 m)	190 lb (86 kg)	Jr	Prairie View A&M	Dallas, TX
F	6	Daniel Zatsepin	6 ft 4 in (1.93 m)	213 lb (97 kg)	Jr	East Central Community College	Moscow, Russia
F	8	Stephen Byard	6 ft 8 in (2.03 m)	218 lb (99 kg)	GS	Rider	Atlantic City, NJ
G	9	Malek Robinson	5 ft 11 in (1.8 m)	155 lb (70 kg)	Fr	Liberty Magnet High School	Baton Rouge, LA
G	10	Corey Sands	6 ft 4 in (1.93 m)	205 lb (93 kg)	GS	Talladega College	Nassau, the Bahamas
G	11	Lionel III Larvadain	6 ft 0 in (1.83 m)	180 lb (82 kg)	So	Delgado Community College	New Orleans, LA
G	12	DaJuan Bates	6 ft 2 in (1.88 m)	175 lb (79 kg)	Jr	Moberly Area Community College	Chicago, IL
F	15	Joseph Owens	6 ft 7 in (2.01 m)	215 lb (98 kg)	GS	Virginia State	DeKalb, IL
F	20	CJ Delancy	6 ft 9 in (2.06 m)	220 lb (100 kg)	Sr	LIU	Jonesboro, AR
G	21	Braelon Bush	5 ft 9 in (1.75 m)	155 lb (70 kg)	GS	Prairie View A&M	Silsbee, TX
F	22	Dailliss Cox	6 ft 6 in (1.98 m)	215 lb (98 kg)	Sr	Christian Brothers	Louisville, KY
F	23	CJ Ray	6 ft 6 in (1.98 m)	215 lb (98 kg)	Sr	Southern Arkansas	Four Oaks, NC
G	25	Dakari Thomas	6 ft 1 in (1.85 m)	190 lb (86 kg)	So	Alcorn State	Amityville, NY

Head coach

- Landon Bussie (Xavier (LA))

Assistant coach(es)

- Ben Mandelbaum (Minnesota)
- Torrence Johnson (Wake Forest)
- Adam Schwartz (UNLV)

Legend

- (C) Team captain
- (S) Suspended
- (I) Ineligible
- (W) Walk-on
- Injured
- Current redshirt

Roster
Last update: November 18, 2025

== Schedule and results ==
Date time, TV	Rank^{#}	Opponent^{#}	Result	Record	High points	High rebounds	High assists	Site (attendance) city, state
Non-conference regular season
November 3, 2025*; 7:00 p.m., ESPN+		at DePaul	L 62–92	0–1	16 – 2 tied	9 – Tankersley	3 – 2 tied	Wintrust Arena (3,495); Chicago, IL
November 6, 2025*; 7:00 p.m., ESPN+		at Saint Louis	L 86–108	0–2	19 – Cox	8 – Cox	3 – Bush	Chaifetz Arena (3,522); St. Louis, MO
November 11, 2025*; 6:00 p.m., ESPN+		at Butler	L 66–98	0–3	24 – Tankersley	4 – Tankersley	2 – 3 tied	Hinkle Fieldhouse (6,159); Indianapolis, IN
November 15, 2025*; 1:00 p.m., NECFR		UIC	L 63–67	0–4	15 – Bush	6 – Byard	3 – 2 tied	Jones Convocation Center (712); Chicago, IL
November 18, 2025*; 7:00 p.m., B1G+		at Minnesota; Acrisure Series on-campus game	L 54–66	0–5	16 – Tankersley	5 – Gibson	3 – Bush	Williams Arena (6,774); Minneapolis, MN
November 20, 2025*; 6:00 p.m., B1G+		at Iowa; Acrisure Series on-campus game	L 54–93	0–6	19 – Tankersley	7 – Byard	3 – Tankersley	Carver–Hawkeye Arena (9,265); Iowa City, IA
November 25, 2025*; 7:00 p.m., ESPN+		at Purdue Fort Wayne; Acrisure Series on-campus game	L 77–90	0–7	18 – Tankersley	4 – Cox	2 – 3 tied	Memorial Coliseum (1,613); Fort Wayne, IN
November 28, 2025*; 3:00 p.m., ESPN+		at Youngstown State	L 64–87	0–8	14 – 2 tied	5 – Zatsepin	5 – Cockrill III	Beeghly Center (1,356); Youngstown, OH
December 1, 2025*; 11:00 a.m., NECFR		South Carolina State	Game cancelled – South Carolina State unable to travel due to inclement weather					Jones Convocation Center; Chicago, IL
December 1, 2025*; 11:00 a.m., NECFR		Saint Xavier; Education Day	W 85–62	1–8	21 – Cockrill III	11 – Cox	3 – Tankersley	Jones Convocation Center (3,707); Chicago, IL
December 6, 2025*; 7:00 p.m., ESPN+		at Illinois State	L 53–95	1–9	13 – Cockrill III	8 – Ray	1 – 5 tied	CEFCU Arena (3,881); Normal, IL
December 14, 2025*; 4:00 p.m., ESPN+		at Loyola Chicago	W 84–75	2–9	22 – Cockrill III	9 – Ray	6 – Tankersley	Joseph J. Gentile Arena (1,972); Chicago, IL
December 16, 2025*; 7:00 p.m., ESPN+		at Bowling Green	L 55–76	2–10	19 – Cockrill III	7 – Byard	2 – 2 tied	Stroh Center (1,715); Bowling Green, OH
December 20, 2025*; 12:00 p.m., B1G+		at Indiana	L 58–78	2–11	12 – Larvadain	4 – 4 tied	1 – 7 tied	Simon Skjodt Assembly Hall (12,549); Bloomington, IN
NEC regular season
January 2, 2026; 6:00 p.m., NECFR		Wagner	L 72–79	2–12 (0–1)	13 – Ray	6 – 2 tied	5 – Bush	Jones Convocation Center (114); Chicago, IL
January 4, 2026; 1:00 p.m., NECFR		LIU	L 55–74	2–13 (0–2)	10 – 3 tied	6 – 2 tied	3 – Bush	Jones Convocation Center (272); Chicago, IL
January 8, 2026; 4:00 p.m., NECFR		at Fairleigh Dickinson	L 63–70	2–14 (0–3)	15 – 2 tied	8 – Byard	2 – 2 tied	Bogota Savings Bank Center (329); Hackensack, NJ
January 10, 2026; 1:00 p.m., NECFR		at Stonehill	L 82–85 ^{OT}	2–15 (0–4)	27 – Ray	7 – Owens	7 – Bush	Merkert Gymnasium (137); Easton, MA
January 17, 2026; 1:00 p.m., NECFR		Le Moyne	L 57–72	2–16 (0–5)	20 – Tankersley	7 – Bush	10 – Bush	Jones Convocation Center (119); Chicago, IL
January 19, 2026; 6:00 p.m., NECFR		New Haven	L 56–62	2–17 (0–6)	17 – Ray	6 – Cox	4 – Tankersley	Jones Convocation Center (71); Chicago, IL
January 23, 2026; 6:00 p.m., NECFR		at Saint Francis	L 60–81	2–18 (0–7)	21 – Ray	7 – Sands	3 – Gibson	DeGol Arena (703); Loretto, PA
January 25, 2026; 1:00 p.m., NECFR		at Mercyhurst	L 59–61	2–19 (0–8)	13 – 2 tied	9 – Cox	3 – Robinson	Owen McCormick Court (356); Erie, PA
January 31, 2026; 1:00 p.m., NECFR		Mercyhurst	W 78–74	3–19 (1–8)	37 – Ray	10 – Ray	Bush – 5	Jones Convocation Center (141); Chicago, IL
February 5, 2026; 6:00 p.m., NECFR		at Central Connecticut	L 67–78	3–20 (1–9)	22 – Ray	6 – Ray	5 – Bush	William H. Detrick Gymnasium (914); New Britain, CT
February 7, 2026; 12:00 p.m., NECFR		at New Haven	W 63–57	4–20 (2–9)	19 – Tankersley	9 – Cockrill III	4 – Tankersley	Hazell Center (590); West Haven, CT
February 9, 2026; 4:00 p.m., NECFR		Saint Francis	W 80–75	5–20 (3–9)	19 – 2 tied	9 – Cockrill III	4 – Tankersley	Jones Convocation Center (27); Chicago, IL
February 12, 2026; 6:00 p.m., NECFR		Stonehill	W 68–55	6–20 (4–9)	18 – Ray	8 – Cox	6 – Tankersley	Jones Convocation Center (183); Chicago, IL
February 14, 2026; 12:00 p.m., NECFR		at Le Moyne	L 63–81	6–21 (4–10)	15 – Ray	10 – Ray	4 – 2 tied	Ted Grant Court (586); DeWitt, NY
February 19, 2026; 6:00 p.m., NECFR		Fairleigh Dickinson	L 59–60	6–22 (4–11)	17 – Cockrill III	8 – Byard	5 – Cockrill III	Jones Convocation Center (456); Chicago, IL
February 21, 2026; 1:00 p.m., NECFR		Central Connecticut	W 70–51	7–22 (5–11)	15 – Ray	9 – Ray	7 – Tankersley	Jones Convocation Center (272); Chicago, IL
February 26, 2026; 6:00 p.m., NECFR		at LIU	L 56–73	7–23 (5–12)	17 – Byard	8 – Byard	4 – Byard	Steinberg Wellness Center; Brooklyn, NY
February 28, 2026; 12:00 p.m., NECFR		at Wagner	L 61–80	7–24 (5–13)	19 – Tankersley	5 – Byard	4 – Bush	Spiro Sports Center (571); Staten Island, NY
NEC tournament
March 4, 2026; 6:00 p.m., NECFR	(8)	at (1) LIU; Quarterfinals	L 75–79	7–25	22 – Byard	12 – Byard	5 – Ray	Steinberg Wellness Center (886); Brooklyn, NY
*Non-conference game. ^{#}Rankings from AP poll. (#) Tournament seedings in parentheses. All times are in Central.
