= 2025–26 Northeast Conference men's basketball season =

- League: NCAA Division I
- Sport: Basketball
- Defending champions: Saint Francis (2024–25)
- Duration: November 3, 2025 – TBD
- Games: 90 regular-season conference games (18 per team) and 7 tournament games
- Teams: 10
- Streaming partner(s): NEC Front Row, ESPN+

NBA draft

Regular season
- Regular-season champions: LIU (1st title) (Note: As the LIU Sharks.)
- Runners-up: Central Connecticut
- Season MVP: Darin Smith Jr. Central Connecticut

NEC tournament final
- Venue: Campus sites
- Champions: LIU (7th title)
- Runners-up: Mercyhurst
- Tournament MVP: Greg Gordon

Northeast Conference men's basketball seasons
- ← 2024–25 2026–27

2025–26 NEC men's basketball standings
	Conf.				Overall
Team	W		L	PCT	W		L	PCT
LIU †	15	–	3	.833	24	–	11	.686
Central Connecticut	12	–	6	.667	18	–	12	.600
Mercyhurst *	10	–	8	.556	17	–	17	.500
Le Moyne *	10	–	8	.556	15	–	17	.469
New Haven **	9	–	9	.500	14	–	17	.452
Stonehill	8	–	10	.444	12	–	21	.364
Fairleigh Dickinson	8	–	10	.444	11	–	21	.344
Wagner	8	–	10	.444	14	–	17	.452
Chicago State	5	–	13	.278	7	–	25	.219
Saint Francis	5	–	13	.278	7	–	24	.226
† 2026 NEC tournament winner * ineligible for the 2026 NCAA tournament due to transition from Division II ** ineligible for both the 2026 NEC tournament and the 2026 NCAA tournament due to transition from Division II

The 2025–26 Northeast Conference men's basketball season, officially the 2025–26 NEC men's basketball season, began with practices in October 2025, and was followed by the start of the 2025–26 NCAA Division I men's basketball season on November 3. Conference play started on January 2, and the regular season ended on February 28, 2026. This was the 45th season of Northeast Conference (NEC) men's basketball. Central Connecticut was the defending regular-season champion. Saint Francis was the defending conference tournament champion.

This was the first season of NEC membership for New Haven, which began its transition from Division II.

This was the final season of NEC membership for Saint Francis, which began its reclassification transition to Division III.

== Offseason ==
Chicago State fired head coach Scott Spinelli after just one season on March 7. Landon Bussie was hired to replace Spinelli on March 20. Bussie had been named Southwestern Athletic Conference coach of the year twice in his five years at the helm at Alcorn State.

On March 25, Saint Francis announced it would reclassify to Division III, and that the 2025–26 season would be its last in Division I. Two days later, Rob Krimmel resigned as head coach after 13 seasons leading Saint Francis, including a 2025 NCAA tournament appearance, and said he planned to retire from coaching. Associate head coach Luke McConnell was immediately promoted to replace Krimmel.

For the fourth straight year, the NEC changed its rules regarding eligibility for the conference tournament. A maximum of two teams transitioning to Division I may participate in the NEC tournament regardless of the number of years they have been in transition with those closest to completing their reclassification receiving priority. Therefore, Mercyhurst is eligible to participate in the 2026 NEC tournament, since Stonehill completed its reclassification to Division I, and Le Moyne and Mercyhurst are in their third and second transition years, respectively. New league member New Haven may participate in the 2027 tournament, provided Le Moyne completes its reclassification as a full, active Division I member in 2026.

== Head coaches ==
Team	Head coach	Previous position	Year at school	Overall record	NEC record	NEC regular-season titles	NEC tournament titles	NCAA tournament record
Central Connecticut	Patrick Sellers	Fairfield (asst.)	5	63–64	39–27	2 (Note: 2023–24 regular-season championship shared with Merrimack.)	0	—
Chicago State	Landon Bussie	Alcorn State	1	0–0	0–0	0	0	—
Fairleigh Dickinson	Jack Castleberry	Fairleigh Dickinson (asst.)	3	28–37	17–15	0	0	—
Le Moyne	Nate Champion	Florida Southern (asst.)	6 (Note: Le Moyne did not play during the 2020–21 season due to the COVID-19 pandemic. Consequently, this is Champion's seventh year as the team's head coach but only his sixth season.)	70–79	13–19	0	0	—
LIU	Rod Strickland	NBA G League Ignite (program director)	4	27–64	19–29	0	0	—
Mercyhurst	Gary Manchel	Ohio (asst.)	23	388–235	9–7	0	0	—
New Haven	Ted Hotaling	Eastern Kentucky (asst.)	15 (Note: New Haven did not play during the 2020–21 season due to the COVID-19 pandemic. Consequently, this is Hotaling's 16th year as the team's head coach but only his 15th season.)	218–184	0–0	0	0	—
Saint Francis	Luke McConnell	Saint Francis (assoc. head coach)	1	0–0	0–0	0	0	—
Stonehill	Chris Kraus	Stonehill (asst.)	12 (Note: Stonehill did not play during the 2020–21 season due to the COVID-19 pandemic. Consequently, this is Kraus's 13th year as the team's head coach but only his 12th season.)	163–160	19–29	0	0	—
Wagner	Donald Copeland (Note: On September 2, 2025, Wagner announced that head coach Donald Copeland had been suspended, while the school investigated allegations of player abuse. On October 28, Wagner announced that Copeland remained the team's head coach, and Dwan McMillan would serve as the interim head coach, while Copeland remained suspended.)	Seton Hall (asst.)	4	46–45	21–27	0	1	1–1
Wagner	Dwan McMillan (interim)	Wagner (asst.)	1	0–0	0–0	0	0	—

Notes
All records, appearances, titles, etc. are from time with current school only.
Year at school includes 2025–26 season.
Overall and NEC/NCAA records are from time at current school and are before the beginning of the 2025–26 season.
Previous jobs are head coaching jobs unless otherwise noted.

== Preseason ==
=== Preseason coaches poll and rankings ===
The table below shows the preseason rankings of NEC teams based on a poll of the conference's coaches as well as each team's preseason Pomeroy rating among the 365 Division I teams.

Rank	Team	Pomeroy rating
1	LIU (unanimous)	287
2	Central Connecticut	315
3	Stonehill	331
4	Mercyhurst	359
5	Fairleigh Dickinson	349
6	Chicago State	362
7	Saint Francis	345
8	Wagner	358
9	Le Moyne	339
10	New Haven	360

() first-place votes

=== Preseason All-NEC team ===
Player	School
Bernie Blunt III (graduate student, guard)	Mercyhurst
Malachi Davis ( (redshirt) senior, guard)	LIU
Jamal Fuller (graduate student, guard/forward)	LIU
Hermann Koffi (sophomore, guard)	Stonehill
Darin Smith Jr. (sophomore, forward)	Central Connecticut

== Regular season ==
=== Early-season multi-team events ===
Eight of the 10 NEC teams participated in multiple-team events (MTEs) during the season. All the MTEs except Coconut Hoops, which is a bracketed tournament, are showcase events.

Team	Event	Sponsor	Record
Central Connecticut	None	—	—
Chicago State	Acrisure Series	not reported	0–3
Fairleigh Dickinson	FDU Basketball Classic	Fairleigh Dickinson	0–2
Le Moyne	Lafayette Classic	Lafayette	2–1
LIU	Illinois Showcase	Illinois	1–1
Mercyhurst	Marshall MTE	Marshall	0–2
New Haven	UConn MTE	UConn	1–2
Saint Francis	Coconut Hoops	Florida Gulf Coast	0–2
Stonehill	Mahoney Classic	Fairfield	0–2
Wagner	None	—	—

=== Pre-conference season highlights ===
New Haven made their Division I debut at no. 4 UConn on November 3, the season's opening day. It was the first road game against a Division I opponent in the Chargers' program history. New Haven's only previous meeting with a Division I team was an 83–68 home loss to Wagner on February 17, 1979. Andre Pasha scored 17 points and grabbed six rebounds for the Chargers, but the Huskies dominated the glass, 40–25, and shot 48% from the floor and 35% from three-point range, cruising to a 79–55 victory.

Bernie Blunt III scored 27 points to lead Mercyhurst to a 73–65 win at Loyola Chicago on November 6. The Lakers built a seven-point lead by intermission and remained in front during the entire second half. Mykolas Ivanauskas snatched nine boards for the Lakers, who outrebounded the Ramblers, 36–30. Deshaun Jackson Jr. came off the bench to score 11 points and dish five assists for Mercyhurst, and Qadir Martin added 12 points, eight rebounds, three blocks, two steals and an assist.

Jabri Fitzpatrick scored 23 points and grabbed six rebounds to lead New Haven to a 73–67 win at UMass Lowell on November 10, the first victory as a Division I program and the first over a Division I opponent in Chargers history. Andre Pasha added 10 points, eight rebounds and three steals for New Haven, and Vere Anthony finished with three assists and a steal in 12 minutes off the bench.

Tre'shawn Sheppard had a double-double with 12 points, 13 boards, an assist, a block and a steal to lead LIU to a 76–72 win at Air Force on November 11. Malachi Davis and Jamal Fuller each scored 14 points for the Sharks. Greg Gordon finished with nine points, five assists and three steals. LIU's bench outscored their counterparts, 36–18.

Darin Smith, Jr. made a layup for Central Connecticut with 3.2 seconds to play, and Donald Hand Jr.'s jump shot was off the mark at the buzzer, giving the Blue Devils a 60–59 win at Boston College on November 11. This was the first win for an NEC team over a power conference opponent since Fairleigh Dickinson defeated Purdue in the 2023 NCAA tournament. This was also the first win over a power conference opponent in Central Connecticut's program history. Smith finished with 14 points and five rebounds. Melo Sanchez scored 17 points, 12 in the second half, to lead Central Connecticut. Max Frazier snatched seven rebounds and scored nine points, including a dunk that capped a 14–5 run, giving the Blue Devils a one-point lead with 6:45 to play, after they had trailed by 11 points early in the second half. Jay Rodgers added six assists, two blocks and no turnovers for Central Connecticut.

LIU built a 17-point halftime lead and then held off a late charge by James Madison, picked to win the Sun Belt title in a preseason poll of the conference's coaches, to earn an 88–79 home victory on November 15. Malachi Davis and Jamal Fuller each scored 21 points to lead the Sharks, and Davis added eight assists, while Fuller grabbed eight rebounds.

=== Conference matrix ===
The table below summarizes the head-to-head results between teams in conference regular-season play. The home team's score is shown in boldface type. Future home games are shown in italics.

	Central Connecticut	Chicago State	Fairleigh Dickinson	Le Moyne	LIU	Mercyhurst	New Haven	Saint Francis	Stonehill	Wagner
vs. Central Connecticut	–	67–**78**; **70**–51	76–**66**; **57**–63	**59**–69; 77–**78**	**84**–78; 80–**59**	**79**–61; 78–**80**	61–**72**; **76**–81	**90**–98; 64–**69**	69–**76**; **61**–59	**55**–62; 67–**84**
vs. Chicago State	**78**–67; 51–**70**	–	**70**–63; 60–**59**	72–**57**; **81**–63	74–**55**; **73**–56	**61**–59; 74–**78**	62–**56**; **57**–63	**81**–60; 75–**80**	**85**–82^{OT}; 55–**68**	79–**72**; **80**–61
vs. Fairleigh Dickinson	**66**–76; 63–**57**	63–**70**; **59**–60	–	87–**74**; **76**–59	66–**59**; **74**–60	**67**–74; 52–**55**	**65**–55; 84–**77**	**85**–82; 59–**66**	**58**–57; 58–**74**	61–**68**; **75**–72^{OT}
vs. Le Moyne	69–**59**; **78**–77	**57**–72; 63–**81**	**74**–87; 59–**76**	–	77–**83**; **83**–61	**74**–60; 57–**58**	47–**73**; **66**–59	**58**–84; 84–**86**	65–**54**; **77**–68	67–**69**; **79**–78
vs. LIU	78–**84**; **59**–80	**55**–74; 56–**73**	**59**–66; 60–**74**	**83**–77; 61–**83**	–	58–**60**; **91**–83	55–**60**; **55**–52	63–**67**; **89**–91	**63**–66; 54–**61**	**57**–67; 65–**83**
vs. Mercyhurst	61–**79**; **80**–78	59–**61**; **78**–74	74–**67**; **55**–52	60–**74**; **58**–57	**60**–58; 83–**91**	–	**57**–61; 51–**70**	89–**98**^{OT} **79**–94	62–**57**^{OT}; **72**–75^{OT}	**69**–70; 83–**80**^{OT}
vs. New Haven	**72**–61; 81–**76**	**56**–62; 63–**57**	55–**65**; **77**–84	**73**–47; 59–**66**	**60**–55; 52–**55**	61–**57**; **70**–51	–	**69**–81; 73–**67**	**55**–70; 51–**64**	74–**80**; **65**–62
vs. Saint Francis	98–**90**; **69**–64	60–**81**; **80**–75	82–**85**; **66**–59	84–**58**; **86**–84	**67**–63; 91–**89**	**98**–89^{OT} 94–**79**	81–**69**; **67**–73	–	61–**63**; **103**–77	**69**–71; 65–**56**
vs. Stonehill	**76**–69; 59–**61**	82–**85**^{OT}; **68**–55	57–**58**; **74**–58	**54**–65; 68–**77**	66–**63**; **61**–54	**57**–62^{OT}; 75–**72**^{OT}	70–**55**; **64**–51	**63**–61; 77–**103**	–	**60**–69; 68–**57**
vs. Wagner	62–**55**; **84**–67	**72**–79; 61–**80**	**68**–61; 72–**75**^{OT}	**69**–67; 78–**79**	67–**57**; **83**–65	70–**69**; **80**–83^{OT}	**80**–74; 62–**65**	71–**69**; **56**–65	69–**60**; **57**–68	–
Record	**12–6**	**5–13**	**8–10**	**10–8**	**15–3**	**10–8**	**9–9**	**5–13**	**8–10**	**8–10**

== Record against other conferences ==
Regular season

NEC vs. power conferences	Record
ACC	1–6
Big East	0–11
Big Ten	1–8
Big 12	0–4
SEC	0–7
NEC vs. power conferences total	2–36
Other NCAA Division I conferences	Record
America East	4–6
American	0–1
ASUN	0–0
Atlantic 10	3–9
Big Sky	0–0
Big South	0–2
Big West	0–0
CAA	1–1
CUSA	1–1
Horizon League	1–3
Ivy League	0–1
MAAC	3–8
Mid-American	0–6
MEAC	3–0
MVC	0–2
MWC	1–0
OVC	0–1
Patriot League	3–4
SoCon	0–0
Southland	0–1
SWAC	0–0
Summit	0–0
Sun Belt	1–2
WAC	0–0
WCC	0–0
Other Division I total	21–48
NCAA Division I total	23–84
NCAA Division III	12–0
NAIA	1–0
USCAA Division I	4–0
USCAA Division II	2–0
Grand total	42–84
Through games of December 29, 2025.

Postseason

NEC vs. power conferences	Record
ACC	0–0
Big East	0–0
Big Ten	0–0
Big 12	0–0
SEC	0–0
NEC vs. power conferences total	0–0
Other NCAA Division I conferences	Record
America East	0–0
American	0–0
ASUN	0–0
Atlantic 10	0–0
Big Sky	0–0
Big South	0–0
Big West	0–0
CAA	0–0
CUSA	0–0
Horizon League	0–0
Ivy League	0–0
MAAC	0–0
Mid-American	0–0
MEAC	0–0
MVC	0–0
MWC	0–0
OVC	0–0
Patriot League	0–0
SoCon	0–0
Southland	0–0
SWAC	0–0
Summit	0–0
Sun Belt	0–0
WAC	0–0
WCC	0–0
Other Division I total	0–0
NCAA Division I total	0–0

=== Games against ranked non-conference opponents ===
The table below shows games played by NEC teams against opponents ranked by the Associated Press at the time of the game.

Date	Visitor	Home	Site	Score	NEC record
Nov. 3	New Haven	No. 4 UConn	Gampel Pavilion ● Storrs, CT	UConn, 79‍–‍55	0−1
Nov. 3	Fairleigh Dickinson	No. 16 Iowa State	Hilton Coliseum ● Ames, IA	Iowa State, 88‍–‍50	0−2
Nov. 17	Stonehill	No. 16 Iowa State	Hilton Coliseum ● Ames, IA	Iowa State, 96‍–‍57	0−3
Nov. 22	LIU	No. 8 Illinois	State Farm Center ● Champaign, IL	Illinois, 98‍–‍58	0−4
Dec. 17	Saint Francis	No. 23 Florida	O'Connell Center ● Gainesville, FL	Florida, 102‍–‍61	0–5
Dec. 29	LIU	No. 23 Georgia	Stegeman Coliseum ● Athens, GA	Georgia, 89‍–‍74	0–6
Dec. 29	New Haven	No. 11 Vanderbilt	Memorial Gymnasium ● Nashville, TN	Vanderbilt, 96‍–‍53	0–7

== Rankings ==
=== KenPom preseason and NET rankings ===
The table below shows the rankings of NEC teams among the 365 Division I teams throughout the season. The preseason ranking is the Pomeroy rating. The remaining weekly rankings are the NET rankings reported by the NCAA beginning with the initial release at the start of week 5. NET rankings are not updated during the NCAA tournament. The rankings shown for week 20 are the final rankings at the conclusion of regular-season and conference-tournament play.

Legend
Increase in ranking
Decrease in ranking

	Pre	Week 5	Week 6	Week 7	Week 8	Week 9	Week 10	Week 11	Week 12	Week 13	Week 14	Week 15	Week 16	Week 17	Week 18	Week 19	Week 20	Final
Central Connecticut	315	151	190	185	220	226	237	231	232	272	283	276	270	285	282	288	289	
Chicago State	362	333	349	322	316	314	335	345	350	354	350	349	344	339	344	340	340	
Fairleigh Dickinson	349	358	353	355	354	355	346	343	346	328	339	325	328	331	333	334	334	
Le Moyne	339	289	281	282	299	298	304	283	277	267	276	280	280	288	287	290	290	
LIU	287	187	189	191	196	194	169	190	189	202	183	187	195	198	195	200	198	
Mercyhurst	359	268	304	320	312	313	314	295	312	291	285	287	283	282	278	275	277	
New Haven	360	315	301	313	319	325	318	326	326	329	329	336	329	321	327	326	325	
Saint Francis	345	359	363	360	358	359	361	354	354	348	354	352	354	353	354	353	353	
Stonehill	331	339	335	342	336	345	340	340	338	341	327	335	339	337	335	332	332	
Wagner	358	198	244	255	245	242	258	312	319	318	321	324	315	314	309	304	302	

=== Mid-major polls ===
The NEC teams shown below were ranked or received votes in either the Mid-Major Madness or College Insider polls of mid-major teams. The Mid-Major Madness poll excludes teams from the Atlantic Coast, Big 12, Big East, Big Ten and Southeastern conferences along with Gonzaga. Teams from the American, Atlantic 10, Atlantic Coast, Big 12, Big East, Big Ten, Mountain West and Southeastern conferences along with Oregon State and Washington State are not eligible for inclusion in the College Insider poll.

	Improvement in ranking
	Drop in ranking
	Not ranked or no votes previous week
RV	Received votes but were not ranked in top 25

Team	Poll	Pre	Week 2	Week 3	Week 4	Week 5	Week 6	Week 7	Week 8	Week 9	Week 10	Week 11	Week 12	Week 13	Week 14	Week 15	Week 16	Week 17	Week 18	Week 19	Week 20	Final
Central Connecticut	MMM	—	—	—	RV	RV	—	—	—	—	—	—	—	—	—	—	—	—	—	no poll	—	—
Central Connecticut	CI	RV	—	—	RV	RV	—	—	—	—	—	—	—	—	—	—	—	—	—	—	—	—
LIU	MMM	—	—	—	—	—	—	—	—	—	—	—	—	—	—	—	—	—	—	no poll	—	—
LIU	CI	RV	—	RV	—	—	—	—	—	—	—	RV	RV	—	RV	RV	—	—	RV	RV	RV	RV

== Awards and honors ==
=== All-NEC honors and awards ===
At the conclusion of the regular season, the conference selected outstanding performers based on a poll of league coaches. Below are the results.

Honor	Recipient	School
Player of the Year	Darin Smith Jr. (Sophomore, Forward)	Central Connecticut
Coach of the Year	Rod Strickland	LIU
Defensive Player of the Year	Greg Gordon (Senior, Guard)	LIU
Rookie of the Year	David Jevtic (Freshman, Guard)	Fairleigh Dickinson
Most Improved Player of the Year	Max Frazier (Junior, Forward)	Central Connecticut
All-NEC First Team	Bernie Blunt III (Graduate, Guard)	Mercyhurst
All-NEC First Team	Malachi Davis ( (redshirt) Senior, Guard)	LIU
All-NEC First Team	Jamal Fuller (Graduate, Forward)	LIU
All-NEC First Team	Shilo Jackson (Graduate, Forward)	Le Moyne
All-NEC First Team	Darin Smith, Jr. (Sophomore, Forward)	Central Connecticut
All-NEC Second Team	Jabri Fitzpatrick (Junior, Guard)	New Haven
All-NEC Second Team	Greg Gordon (Senior, Guard)	LIU
All-NEC Second Team	Nick Jones (Junior, Guard)	Wagner
All-NEC Second Team	Trent Mosquera ( (redshirt) Junior, Guard)	Le Moyne
All-NEC Second Team	Jay Rodgers (Senior, Guard)	Central Connecticut
All-NEC Third Team	Max Frazier (Junior, Forward)	Central Connecticut
All-NEC Third Team	Jake Lemelman (Sophomore, Guard)	Mercyhurst
All-NEC Third Team	Joey Niesman (Graduate, Guard)	Fairleigh Dickinson
All-NEC Third Team	CJ Ray (Senior, Forward)	Chicago State
All-NEC Third Team	Skylar Wicks ( (redshirt) Senior, Guard/Forward)	Saint Francis
All-NEC Defensive Team	Max Frazier (Junior, Forward)	Central Connecticut
All-NEC Defensive Team	Greg Gordon (Senior, Guard)	LIU
All-NEC Defensive Team	Shilo Jackson (Graduate, Forward)	Le Moyne
All-NEC Defensive Team	Qadir Martin (Sophomore, Forward)	Mercyhurst
All-NEC Defensive Team	Chas Stinson (Senior, Guard)	Stonehill
All-NEC Rookie Team	Eli Greenberg (Freshman, Guard)	Le Moyne
All-NEC Rookie Team	David Jevtic (Freshman, Guard)	Fairleigh Dickinson
All-NEC Rookie Team	Roddy Jones ( (redshirt) Freshman, Guard)	Central Connecticut
All-NEC Rookie Team	Ashton Reynolds (Freshman, Guard)	Central Connecticut
All-NEC Rookie Team	Teshaun Steele (Freshman, Guard/Forward)	New Haven

=== Weekly conference awards ===
Throughout the regular season, the NEC names players of the week and rookies of the week.

Week	Player of the week	Rookie of the week
1 – November 10, 2025	Greg Gordon, LIU	David Jevtic, FDU
2 – November 17, 2025	Darrin Smith Jr., CCSU	Elijah Parker, CCSU
2 – November 17, 2025	Malachi Davis, LIU	Elijah Parker, CCSU
3 – November 24, 2025	Jay Rodgers, CCSU	Tristan Burth, NHV
4 – December 1, 2025	Darrin Smith Jr. (2), CCSU	Ashton Reynolds, CCSU
4 – December 1, 2025	Nick Jones, WAG	Ashton Reynolds, CCSU
5 – December 8, 2025	Malachi Davis (2), LIU	Paris Papadatos, SFU
6 – December 15, 2025	Greg Gordon (2), LIU	Roddy Jones, CCSU
7 – December 23, 2025	Qadir Martin, MER	Ashton Reynolds (2), CCSU
8 – December 30, 2025	Shilo Jackson, LEM	David Jevtic (2), FDU
9 – January 6, 2026	Jamal Fuller, LIU	Aidan Losiewicz, NHV
10 – January 12, 2026	Darrin Smith Jr. (3), CCSU	David Jevtic (3), FDU
11 – January 21, 2026	Darrin Smith Jr. (4), CCSU	Teshaun Steele, NHV
12 – January 27, 2026	Trent Mosquera, LEM	David Jevtic (4), FDU
13 – February 2, 2026	CJ Ray, CHI	Ashton Reynolds (3), CCSU
13 – February 2, 2026	Jamal Fuller (2), LIU	Ashton Reynolds (3), CCSU
14 – February 9, 2026	Taeshaud Jackson, FDU	Roddy Jones (2), CCSU
15 – February 16, 2026	Darrin Smith Jr. (5), CCSU	Roddy Jones (3), CCSU
16 – February 23, 2026	Jabri Fitzpatrick, NHV	None awarded

School	Player of the week awards	Rookie of the week awards
Central Connecticut	6	7
Chicago State	1	0
Fairleigh Dickinson	1	4
Le Moyne	2	0
LIU	6	0
Mercyhurst	1	0
New Haven	1	3
Saint Francis	0	1
Stonehill	0	0
Wagner	1	0

== Media coverage ==
ESPNU will televise one conference regular-season game. YES will televise one conference regular-season game and both conference tournament semifinal games. SportsNet Pittsburgh+ and NESN+ will each broadcast one conference regular-season game. NESN Nation will stream all four games shown by YES and SportsNet Pittsburgh+. A simulcast of all five games broadcast by YES, SportsNet Pittsburgh+ and NESN+ will be streamed by ESPN+. In addition to the simulcasts, ESPN+ will exclusively stream two other conference regular-season games. The conference tournament final will be televised by ESPN2. All home games of NEC teams not televised by a conference media partner will be streamed by NEC Front Row, the conference's streaming platform. Ryz Sports Network will simulcast the NEC Front Row streams of 10 games of the week, including one of the conference tournament quarterfinal games.

The 2026 NEC tournament final will mark the 39th consecutive year that the conference's championship game was broadcast on linear television by an ESPN network.

Creator Sports Network will produce alternative streams of select NEC Front Row games with additional live commentary and interactive content alongside the game feed in the style of a Manningcast. Craig D'Amico will also stream select games in a similar format on the NEC's YouTube and Twitch channels.

In addition to the conference's television agreements, six Fairleigh Dickinson home games will be broadcast by YES.
