= Steinberg Wellness Center =

Multi-purpose arena in New York City

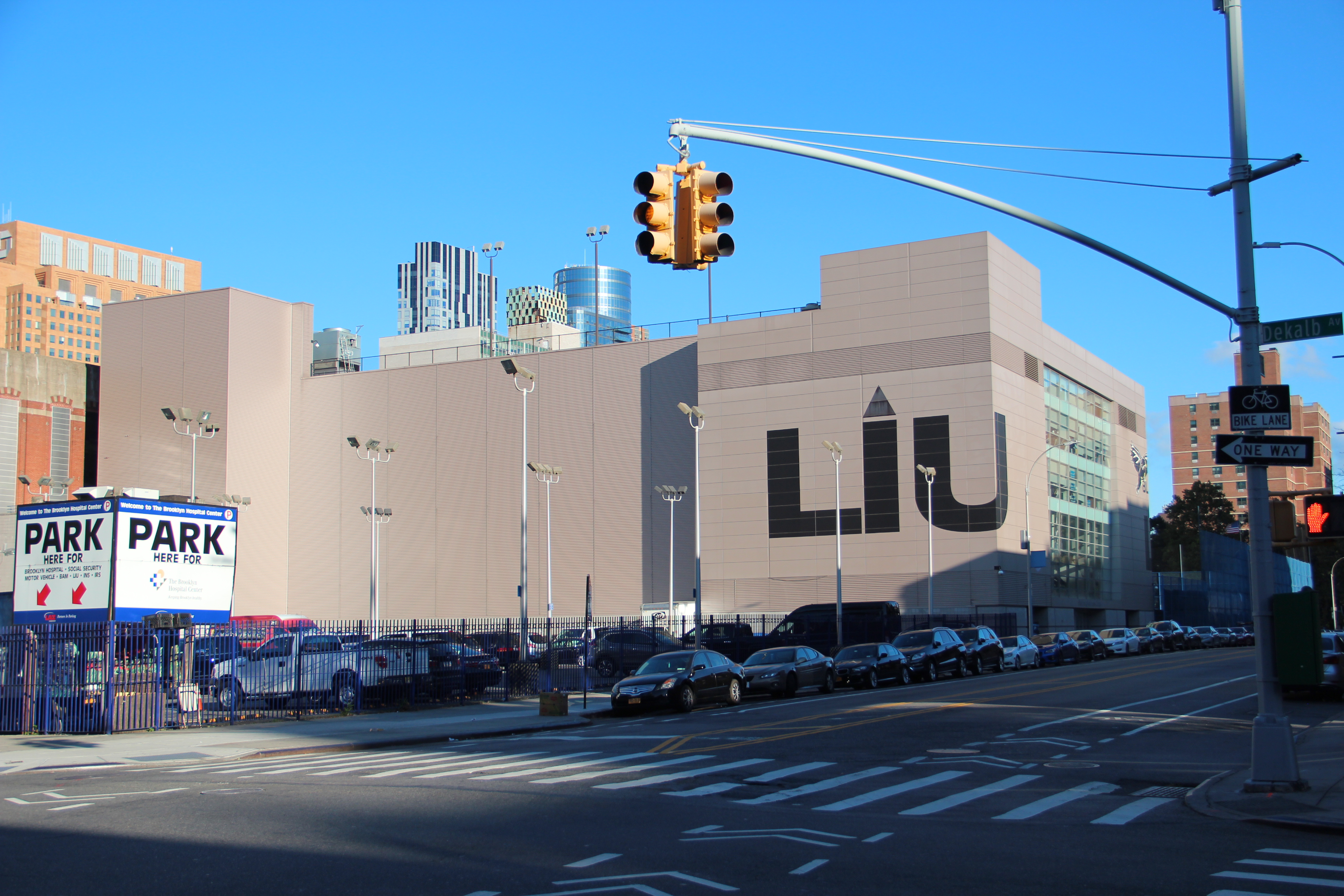
- Interactive map of Steinberg Wellness Center
- Coordinates: 40.69059°N 73.979176°W
- Owner: Long Island University
- Operator: Long Island University
- Capacity: 2,500
- Surface: Hardwood

Construction
- Groundbreaking: October 2004
- Opened: January 26, 2006
- Cost: $45 million ($71.9 million in 2025 dollars)
- Architect: Arquitectonica
- Project managers: rcRussell Construction Management Services, LLC.
- Structural engineer: Thornton Tomasetti

Tenants
- LIU Sharks (NCAA) (2019–present); LIU Brooklyn Blackbirds (NCAA) (2006–2019)

The Steinberg Wellness Center, formally known as the Wellness, Recreation and Athletic Center (WRAC), is a 2,500-seat multi-purpose arena in Brooklyn, New York. It was built in 2006 and is home to the Long Island University men's and women's basketball, women's volleyball, women's fencing, women's swimming and diving, and women's water polo teams. LIU previously played their home games at the Schwartz Athletic Center. Following President David Steinberg's retirement in Spring 2013, the WRAC was renamed the Steinberg Wellness Center to honor his 27-year tenure as President.

== See also ==
- List of NCAA Division I basketball arenas
