= Merkert Gymnasium =

Multi-purpose arena in Easton, Massachusetts

- Interactive map of Merkert Gymnasium
- Location: Easton, Massachusetts
- Coordinates: 42.0576°N 71.0789°W
- Owner: Stonehill College
- Operator: Stonehill College
- Capacity: 1,560
- Surface: Hardwood

Construction
- Opened: 1973

Tenant
- Stonehill Skyhawks

Merkert Gymnasium is a multi-purpose arena in Easton, Massachusetts, USA. It is home to the Stonehill College Skyhawks men's and women's basketball and volleyball teams.

The basketball court is called the Paula Sullivan Court, named after the longtime women's basketball head coach for 25 years (1971–1996), when the Skyhawks posted an overall record of 479–159 (.751) and captured six Northeast-10 Conference championships.
