= 2025–26 Siena Saints men's basketball team =

American college basketball season

2025–26 Siena Saints men's basketball
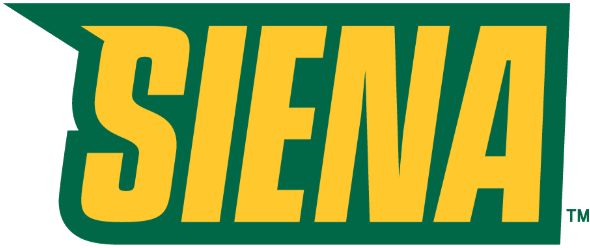

MAAC tournament champions

NCAA tournament, First round
- Conference: Metro Atlantic Athletic Conference
- Record: 23–12 (13–7 MAAC)
- Head coach: Gerry McNamara (2nd season)
- Assistant coaches: Ben Lee; Ryan Blackwell; Arinze Onuaku
- Home arena: MVP Arena

2025–26 MAAC men's basketball standings
	Conf.				Overall
Team	W		L	PCT	W		L	PCT
Merrimack	17	–	3	.850	23	–	11	.676
Saint Peter's	14	–	6	.700	17	–	12	.586
Siena †	13	–	7	.650	23	–	12	.657
Quinnipiac	12	–	8	.600	19	–	13	.594
Marist	12	–	8	.600	19	–	12	.613
Mount St. Mary's	11	–	9	.550	15	–	17	.469
Fairfield	11	–	9	.550	21	–	13	.618
Iona	10	–	10	.500	18	–	14	.563
Sacred Heart	9	–	11	.450	14	–	19	.424
Manhattan	8	–	12	.400	12	–	20	.375
Niagara	5	–	15	.250	8	–	22	.267
Canisius	5	–	15	.250	10	–	21	.323
Rider	3	–	17	.150	4	–	25	.138
† 2026 MAAC tournament winner

The 2025–26 Siena Saints men's basketball team represented Siena University during the 2025–26 NCAA Division I men's basketball season. The Saints, led by second-year head coach Gerry McNamara, played their home games at MVP Arena in Albany, New York as members of the Metro Atlantic Athletic Conference.

The Saints defeated Mount St. Mary's, Fairfield, and Merrimack to win the MAAC tournament championship. As a result, they received the conference's automatic bid to the NCAA tournament. Seeded No. 16 in the East region, the Saints were matched up against the top overall seed Duke Blue Devils. The Saints nearly pulled off a historic upset in the first round, jumping out to a 43–32 lead at halftime over the Blue Devils, but were ultimately defeated by a score of 71–65 on the opening day of the tournament. They were the first 16 seed to take a double-digit halftime lead on a 1 seed in tournament history.

== Previous season ==
The Saints finished the 2024–25 season 14–18, 9–11 in MAAC play, to finish in a tie for eighth place. They were defeated by Rider in the first round of the MAAC tournament.

== Preseason ==
On September 30, 2025, the MAAC released their preseason coaches poll. Siena was picked to finish second in the conference, while receiving three first-place votes.

=== Preseason rankings ===
MAAC Preseason Poll
Place	Team	Points
1	Quinnipiac	158 (8)
2	Siena	152 (3)
3	Sacred Heart	140 (2)
4	Manhattan	133
5	Marist	115
6	Iona	104
7	Merrimack	85
8	Fairfield	74
9	Mount St. Mary's	69
10	Rider	59
11	Saint Peter's	48
12	Niagara	26
13	Canisius	20
(#) first-place votes

=== Preseason All-MAAC Teams ===
Preseason All-MAAC Teams
Team	Player	Position	Year
First	Justice Shoats*	Guard	Senior
Second	Gavin Doty	Guard	Sophomore
(*) Unanimous selection

== Roster ==
2025–26 Siena Saints men's basketball team
Players
Coaches

Pos.	#	Name	Height	Weight	Year	Previous school	Hometown
G	0	Justice Shoats	5 ft 11 in (1.8 m)	180 lb (82 kg)	Sr	Lock Haven	Wilkes-Barre, Pennsylvania
F	1	Isaiah Henderson	6 ft 6 in (1.98 m)	220 lb (100 kg)	Fr	Kimball Union Academy	Painted Post, New York
F	2	Antonio Chandler	6 ft 6 in (1.98 m)	215 lb (98 kg)	GS	Southern Connecticut	Piscataway, New Jersey
G	3	Christian Jones	5 ft 11 in (1.8 m)	160 lb (73 kg)	Fr	Hillcrest Prep	Katy, Texas
G	4	Gavin Doty	6 ft 5 in (1.96 m)	190 lb (86 kg)	So	Fulton High School	Fulton, New York
F	5	Tasman Goodrick	6 ft 10 in (2.08 m)	230 lb (104 kg)	Jr	Gannon	Sydney, Australia
F	7	Tajae Jones	6 ft 8 in (2.03 m)	210 lb (95 kg)	So	Long Island Lutheran High School	Waterbury, Connecticut
G	8	Mosi Clayton	6 ft 1 in (1.85 m)	190 lb (86 kg)	Jr	Believe Prep	Brooklyn, New York
G	9	Owen Schlager	6 ft 3 in (1.91 m)	190 lb (86 kg)	Fr	Trinity High School	Mechanicsburg, Pennsylvania
F	11	Francis Folefac	6 ft 7 in (2.01 m)	245 lb (111 kg)	Fr	Mt. Zion Prep	Lanham, Maryland
G	12	Reid Ducharme	6 ft 7 in (2.01 m)	200 lb (91 kg)	RS So	Xavier	Milton, Massachusetts
G	15	Danny Murray	6 ft 4 in (1.93 m)	200 lb (91 kg)	Fr	La Lumiere School	Deer Park, New York
F	21	Brendan Coyle	6 ft 7 in (2.01 m)	200 lb (91 kg)	Sr	Cushing Academy	Niskayuna, New York
G	24	Cooper Nadler (W)	6 ft 5 in (1.96 m)	200 lb (91 kg)	So	Glens Falls High School	Lake George, New York
G	33	Chris Torres (W)	6 ft 2 in (1.88 m)	170 lb (77 kg)	So	Millbrook School	Suffern, New York
G	44	Marcus Jackson	6 ft 2 in (1.88 m)	185 lb (84 kg)	Sr	Albany	Amsterdam, New York
C	55	Riley Mulvey	7 ft 0 in (2.13 m)	240 lb (109 kg)	GS	Iowa	Rotterdam, New York

Head coach

- Gerry McNamara (Syracuse)

Assistant coach(es)

- Ben Lee (Union (NY))
- Ryan Blackwell (Syracuse)
- Arinze Onuaku (Syracuse)

Legend

- (C) Team captain
- (S) Suspended
- (I) Ineligible
- (W) Walk-on
- Injured
- Current redshirt

Roster
Last update: November 10, 2025

== Schedule and results ==
Date time, TV	Rank^{#}	Opponent^{#}	Result	Record	Site (attendance) city, state
Exhibition
October 19, 2025*; 2:00 pm		Union	W 93–51	–	UHY Center (1,025); Loudonville, NY
Regular season
November 3, 2025*; 7:00 pm, ESPN+		Bryant	W 82–66	1–0	MVP Arena (4,072); Albany, NY
November 7, 2025*; 7:00 pm, ESPN+		at Brown	W 62–46	2–0	Pizzitola Sports Center (564); Providence, RI
November 12, 2025*; 7:00 pm, ESPN+		at St. Bonaventure; Franciscan Cup	L 66–75	2–1	Reilly Center (3,451); St. Bonaventure, NY
November 17, 2025*; 7:00 pm, ESPN+		Colgate	L 69–72	2–2	MVP Arena (4,078); Albany, NY
November 21, 2025*; 7:00 pm, ESPN+		Albany; Albany Cup	W 73–63	3–2	MVP Arena (7,024); Albany, NY
November 24, 2025*; 6:00 pm, ESPN+		at Holy Cross	W 73–69	4–2	Hart Center (807); Worcester, MA
November 28, 2025*; 1:00 pm		vs. Longwood; Capital Thanksgiving Classic	W 70–63	5–2	Bender Arena (572); Washington, D.C.
November 29, 2025*; 4:00 pm, ESPN+		at American; Capital Thanksgiving Classic	W 59–55	6–2	Bender Arena (821); Washington, D.C.
November 30, 2025*; 1:00 pm		vs. Maine; Capital Thanksgiving Classic	W 64–60	7–2	Bender Arena (136); Washington, D.C.
December 5, 2025; 7:00 pm, ESPN+		Niagara	W 83–54	8–2 (1–0)	MVP Arena (4,259); Albany, NY
December 7, 2025; 2:00 pm, ESPN+		Canisius	W 74–52	9–2 (2–0)	MVP Arena (4,439); Albany, NY
December 17, 2025*; 7:00 pm, ESPN+		at Vermont	L 69–83	9–3	Patrick Gym (1,767); Burlington, VT
December 22, 2025*; 6:00 pm, BTN		at Indiana	L 60–81	9–4	Simon Skjodt Assembly Hall (12,647); Bloomington, IN
January 2, 2026; 7:00 pm, ESPN+		at Iona	L 72–75	9–5 (2–1)	Hynes Athletics Center (1,545); New Rochelle, NY
January 4, 2026; 2:00 pm, ESPN+		at Rider	W 74–65	10–5 (3–1)	Alumni Gymnasium (1,014); Lawrenceville, NJ
January 9, 2026; 7:00 pm, ESPN+		Merrimack	L 59–63	10–6 (3–2)	MVP Arena (4,833); Albany, NY
January 11, 2026; 2:00 pm, ESPN+		at Mount St. Mary's	W 67–50	11–6 (4–2)	Knott Arena (2,001); Emmitsburg, MD
January 14, 2026; 7:00 pm, ESPN+		Sacred Heart	L 80–86	11–7 (4–3)	MVP Arena (4,005); Albany, NY
January 17, 2026; 2:00 pm, ESPN+		at Manhattan	W 74–59	12–7 (5–3)	Draddy Gymnasium (1,063); Riverdale, NY
January 19, 2026; 2:00 pm, ESPN+		Fairfield	W 85–77	13–7 (6–3)	MVP Arena (6,385); Albany, NY
January 22, 2026; 7:00 pm, ESPN+/SNY		Marist	W 69–50	14–7 (7–3)	MVP Arena (4,786); Albany, NY
January 30, 2026; 6:30 pm, ESPN+		at Niagara	W 82–79	15–7 (8–3)	Gallagher Center (1,048); Lewiston, NY
February 1, 2026; 1:00 pm, ESPN+		at Canisius	W 78–63	16–7 (9–3)	Koessler Athletic Center (829); Buffalo, NY
February 5, 2026; 7:00 pm, ESPNU		Iona	W 79–72	17–7 (10–3)	MVP Arena (5,140); Albany, NY
February 7, 2026; 2:00 pm, ESPN+		at Saint Peter's	L 65–70	17–8 (10–4)	Run Baby Run Arena (644); Jersey City, NJ
February 13, 2026; 7:00 pm, ESPN+		Quinnipiac	L 62–74	17–9 (10–5)	MVP Arena (5,803); Albany, NY
February 15, 2026; 2:00 pm, ESPN+		at Marist	W 67–63	18–9 (11–5)	McCann Arena (2,805); Poughkeepsie, NY
February 20, 2026; 8:00 pm, ESPNU		at Merrimack	L 72–79 ^{OT}	18–10 (12–6)	Lawler Arena (2,919); North Andover, MA
February 22, 2026; 2:00 pm, ESPN+		Saint Peter's	W 72–63	19–10 (12–6)	MVP Arena (6,113); Albany, NY
February 27, 2026; 7:00 pm, ESPN+		at Fairfield	L 58–72	19–11 (12–7)	Leo D. Mahoney Arena (2,425); Fairfield, CT
March 1, 2026; 2:00 pm, ESPN+		Rider	W 76–61	20–11 (13–7)	MVP Arena (6,016); Albany, NY
MAAC tournament
March 7, 2026; 8:30 pm, ESPN+	(3)	vs. (6) Mount St. Mary's; Quarterfinal	W 63–58	21–11	Boardwalk Hall (2,047); Atlantic City, NJ
March 8, 2026; 8:30 pm, ESPN+	(3)	vs. (7) Fairfield; Semifinal	W 76–61	22–11	Boardwalk Hall (1,395); Atlantic City, NJ
March 10, 2026; 9:00 pm, ESPN2	(3)	vs. (1) Merrimack; Championship	W 64–54	23–11	Boardwalk Hall (1,726); Atlantic City, NJ
NCAA tournament
March 19, 2026; 2:50 p.m., CBS	(16 E)	vs. (1 E) No. 1 Duke; First round	L 65–71	23–12	Bon Secours Wellness Arena (13,919); Greenville, SC
*Non-conference game. ^{#}Rankings from AP Poll. (#) Tournament seedings in parentheses. E=East. All times are in Eastern.
