= Chris Casey =

American college basketball coach

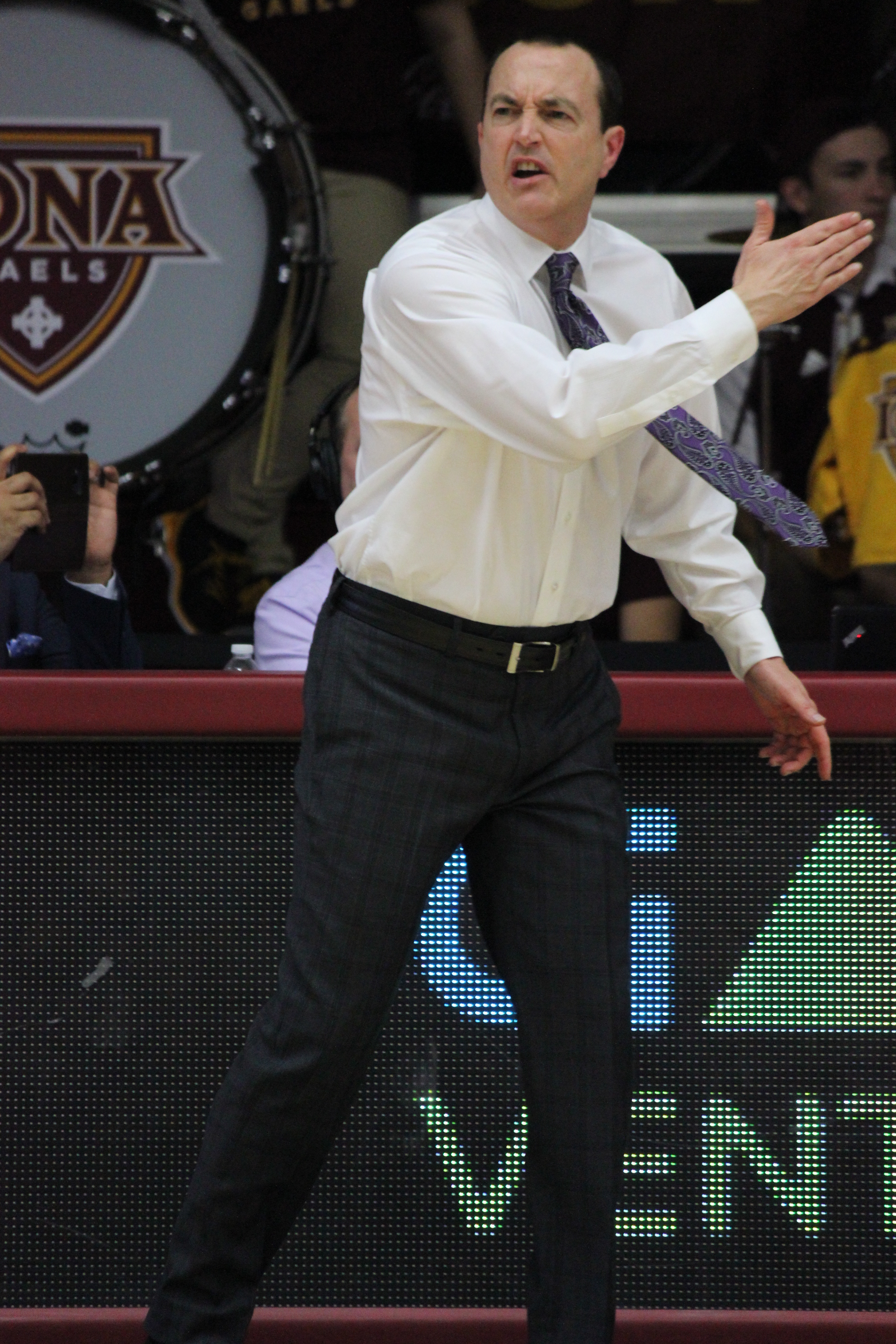
- Casey in 2018

Current position
- Title: Head coach
- Team: Fairfield
- Conference: MAAC
- Record: 61–48 (.560)

Biographical details
- Born: October 16, 1963 (age 63)

Playing career
- 1982–1986: Western Connecticut State

Coaching career (HC unless noted)
- 1986–1988: Central Connecticut (assistant)
- 1988–1989: Western Connecticut State (assistant)
- 1989–1990: St. Francis (NY) (assistant)
- 1990–1998: Saint Peter's (assistant)
- 1998–2001: Rutgers–Newark
- 2001–2006: Central Connecticut (assistant)
- 2006–2010: St. John's (assistant)
- 2010–2013: LIU Post
- 2013–2019: Niagara
- 2019–2023: Fairfield (assistant)
- 2023–present: Fairfield

Head coaching record
- Overall: 187–202 (.481) (NCAA); 27–46 (.370) (NJCAA)
- Tournaments: 0–2 (NCAA D2); 2–1 (CBI); 0–1 (CIT)

Chris Casey (born October 15, 1963) is an American head college basketball coach. He is currently the head coach for the Fairfield Stags men's basketball team. He was the head coach of the Niagara Purple Eagles men's basketball team. On March 11, 2019, he was released. He finished at Niagara with a six-year record of 64–129. He took over the head coach position after former head coach Jay Young stepped down as head coach on October 16, 2023. Casey was the interim head coach through the whole of the regular season, but was named head coach on March 12, 2024.

== Head coaching record ==
Record table
Season	Team	Overall	Conference	Standing	Postseason
Rutgers–Newark Scarlet Raiders (New Jersey Athletic Conference) (1998–2001)
1998–99	Rutgers–Newark	5–19	2–16		
1999–00	Rutgers–Newark	8–16	3–15		
2000–01	Rutgers–Newark	14–11	8–10		
Rutgers–Newark:		27–46 (.370)			
LIU Post Pioneers (East Coast Conference) (2010–2013)
2010–11	LIU Post	21–10	16–5	2nd	NCAA Tournament 1st Round
2011–12	LIU Post	23–6	15–1	1st	NCAA Tournament 1st Round
2012–13	LIU Post	18–9	13–5	T–1st	
LIU Post:		62–25 (.713)	44–11 (.800)		
Niagara Purple Eagles (Metro Atlantic Athletic Conference) (2013–2019)
2013–14	Niagara	7–26	3–17	11th	
2014–15	Niagara	8–22	7–13	T–8th	
2015–16	Niagara	7–25	5–15	10th	
2016–17	Niagara	10–23	6–14	9th	
2017–18	Niagara	19–14	12–6	3rd	CIT First Round
2018–19	Niagara	13–19	6–12	T–9th	
Niagara:		64–129 (.332)	39–77 (.336)		
Fairfield Stags (Metro Atlantic Athletic Conference) (2023–2026)
2023–24	Fairfield	24–13	14–6	2nd	CBI Semifinals
2024–25	Fairfield	12–20	8–12	10th	
2025–26	Fairfield	21–13	11–9	T–6th	
Fairfield Stags (Metro Conference) (2026–present)
2026–27	Fairfield	4–2	0–0		
Fairfield:		61–48 (.560)	33–27 (.550)		
Total:		214–248 (.463)			
National champion Postseason invitational champion Conference regular season champion Conference regular season and conference tournament champion Division regular season champion Division regular season and conference tournament champion Conference tournament champion
