= 2026 MAAC men's basketball tournament =

American college basketball tournament

- Classification: Division I
- Season: 2025–26
- Teams: 10
- Site: Jim Whelan Boardwalk Hall; Atlantic City, New Jersey
- Champions: Siena (6th title)
- Winning coach: Gerry McNamara (1st title)
- MVP: Gavin Doty (Siena)
- Television: ESPN+, ESPN/ESPN2

2025–26 MAAC men's basketball standings
	Conf.				Overall
Team	W		L	PCT	W		L	PCT
Merrimack	17	–	3	.850	23	–	11	.676
Saint Peter's	14	–	6	.700	17	–	12	.586
Siena †	13	–	7	.650	23	–	12	.657
Quinnipiac	12	–	8	.600	19	–	13	.594
Marist	12	–	8	.600	19	–	12	.613
Mount St. Mary's	11	–	9	.550	15	–	17	.469
Fairfield	11	–	9	.550	21	–	13	.618
Iona	10	–	10	.500	18	–	14	.563
Sacred Heart	9	–	11	.450	14	–	19	.424
Manhattan	8	–	12	.400	12	–	20	.375
Niagara	5	–	15	.250	8	–	22	.267
Canisius	5	–	15	.250	10	–	21	.323
Rider	3	–	17	.150	4	–	25	.138
† 2026 MAAC tournament winner

The 2026 Metro Atlantic Athletic Conference men's basketball tournament was the postseason men's basketball tournament for the Metro Atlantic Athletic Conference for the 2025–26 NCAA Division I men's basketball season. The tournament was played March 5–10, 2026, at the Jim Whelan Boardwalk Hall in Atlantic City, New Jersey. The tournament winner, Siena, received the conference's automatic bid to the 2026 NCAA Division I men's basketball tournament.

This was the last conference tournament under the Metro Atlantic Athletic Conference name. In July 2026, the conference rebranded as the Metro Conference.

== Seeds ==
Only the top 10 teams in the conference participated in the tournament. The top six teams received byes to the quarterfinals. Teams were seeded by record within the conference, with a tiebreaker system to seed teams with identical conference records.

Seed	School	Conference	Tiebreaker
1	Merrimack	17–3	
2	Saint Peter's	14–6	
3	Siena	13–7	
4	Quinnipiac	12–8	1–0 vs. Siena
5	Marist	12–8	0–2 vs. Siena
6	Mount St. Mary's	11–9	1–0 vs. Fairfield
7	Fairfield	11–9	0–1 vs. Mount St. Mary's
8	Iona	10–10	
9	Sacred Heart	9–11	
10	Manhattan	8–12	
DNQ	Niagara	5–15	2–0 vs. Canisius
DNQ	Canisius	5–15	0–2 vs. Niagara
DNQ	Rider	3–17	

== Schedule ==
Session	Game	Time*	Matchup	Score	Attendance	Television
First round – Thursday, March 5
1	1	6:00 p.m.	No. 8 Iona vs No. 9 Sacred Heart	80–91	1,037	ESPN+
1	2	8:30 p.m.	No. 7 Fairfield vs No. 10 Manhattan	71–60	1,037	ESPN+
Quarterfinals – Friday, March 6
2	3	6:00 p.m.	No. 1 Merrimack vs No. 9 Sacred Heart	70–48	1,565	ESPN+
2	4	8:30 p.m.	No. 2 Saint Peter's vs No. 7 Fairfield	55–74	1,565	ESPN+
Quarterfinals – Saturday, March 7
3	5	6:00 p.m.	No. 4 Quinnipiac vs No. 5 Marist	75–77	2,047	ESPN+
3	6	8:30 p.m.	No. 3 Siena vs No. 6 Mount St. Mary's	63–58	2,047	ESPN+
Semifinals – Sunday, March 8
4	7	6:00 p.m.	No. 1 Merrimack vs No. 5 Marist	58–57	1,395	ESPN+
4	8	8:30 p.m.	No. 3 Siena vs No. 7 Fairfield	76–61	1,395	ESPN+
Championship – Tuesday, March 10
5	9	9:00 p.m.	No. 1 Merrimack vs No. 3 Siena	54–64	1,726	ESPN2
*Game times in EST. Rankings denote tournament seeding.

== Bracket ==
First round March 5 ESPN+
8	Iona	80
9	Sacred Heart	91
7	Fairfield	71
10	Manhattan	60

Quarterfinals; March 6–7; ESPN+
1	Merrimack	70
9	Sacred Heart	48
4	Quinnipiac	75
5	Marist	77
2	Saint Peter's	55
7	Fairfield	74
3	Siena	63
6	Mount St. Mary's	58

Semifinals; March 8 ESPN+
1	Merrimack	58
5	Marist	57
7	Fairfield	61
3	Siena	76

Championship; March 10; ESPN2
1	Merrimack	54
3	Siena	64

== Awards and honors ==
=== All-Tournament Team ===
Player	Team
**Gavin Doty**	Siena
Justice Shoats	Siena
Riley Mulvey	Siena
Kevair Kennedy	Merrimack
Tye Dorset	Merrimack
Branden Benjamin	Fairfield
Justin Menard	Marist

MVP in bold

== See also ==
- 2026 MAAC women's basketball tournament
