= Dan Geriot =

American basketball coach (born 1988)

Current position
- Title: Head coach
- Team: Iona
- Conference: MAAC
- Record: 21–18 (.538)

Biographical details
- Born: August 8, 1988 (age 38); Springfield, Pennsylvania, U.S.

Playing career
- 2006–2011: Richmond
- Position: Center

Coaching career (HC unless noted)
- 2011–2013: Princeton (assistant)
- 2013–2015: Campbell (assistant)
- 2018–2022: Cleveland Cavaliers (assistant)
- 2022–2023: Cleveland Charge
- 2023–2024: Cleveland Cavaliers (assistant)
- 2024–2025: New Orleans Pelicans (assistant)
- 2025–present: Iona

Administrative career (AD unless noted)
- 2015–2018: Cleveland Cavaliers (video coordinator)

Head coaching record
- Overall: 21–18 (.538)

Dan Geriot (born August 8, 1988) is an American college basketball coach who currently serves as the head coach of the Iona Gaels.

== Playing career ==
Geriot played college basketball from 2006 to 2011 for the Richmond Spiders, averaging 10.4 points and 4.1 rebounds, finishing with 1,386 points, after high school summer training with Kevin Roe. Geriot also helped the team to a Sweet 16 run in 2011. After his collegiate career, he played professionally in Belgium for a season.

== Coaching career ==
Geriot got his first coaching job in 2011 as an assistant coach for the Princeton Tigers. In 2013, he joined the Campbell Fighting Camels as an assistant coach. In 2015, Geriot got his first NBA job, as was hired as the video coordinator for the Cleveland Cavaliers. He stayed with the Cavaliers until 2024, where he served as an assistant coach and the head coach of the team's NBA G League affiliate, the Cleveland Charge. Ahead of the 2024 season, Geriot was hired as an assistant coach for the New Orleans Pelicans.

=== Iona ===
On March 20, 2025, Geriot was hired as the next head coach of the Iona Gaels.

== Head coaching record ==
=== NCAA DI ===
Record table
Season	Team	Overall	Conference	Standing	Postseason
Iona Gaels (Metro Atlantic Athletic Conference) (2025–2026)
2025–26	Iona	18–14	10–10	8th	
Iona Gaels (Metro Conference) (2026–present)
2026–27	Iona	3–4	0–0		
Iona:		21–18 (.538)	10–10 (.500)		
Total:		21–18 (.538)			
National champion Postseason invitational champion Conference regular season champion Conference regular season and conference tournament champion Division regular season champion Division regular season and conference tournament champion Conference tournament champion
