= 2025–26 Canisius Golden Griffins men's basketball team =

American college basketball season

2025–26 Canisius Golden Griffins men's basketball
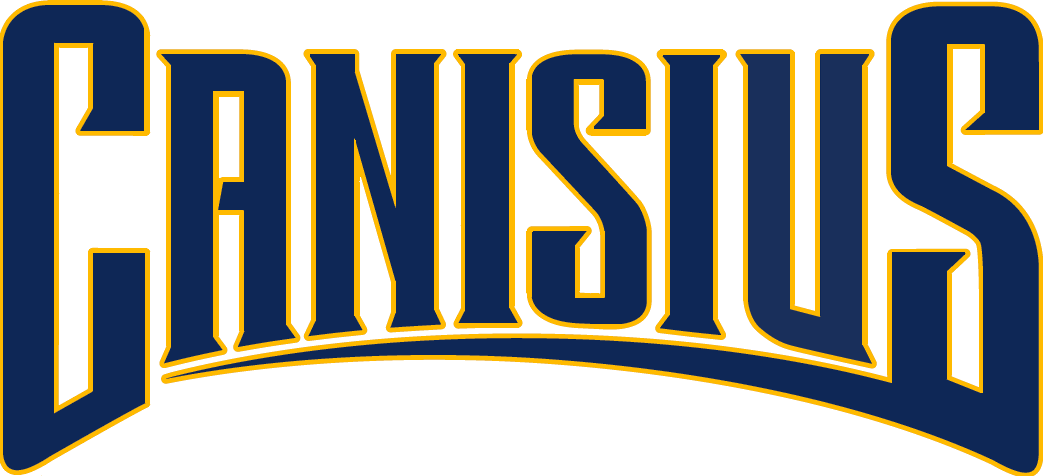
- Conference: Metro Atlantic Athletic Conference
- Record: 10–21 (5–15 MAAC)
- Head coach: Jim Christian (2nd season)
- Assistant coaches: Herschel Jenkins; Kian Boroujerdi; Jimmy Hall
- Home arena: Koessler Athletic Center

2025–26 MAAC men's basketball standings
	Conf.				Overall
Team	W		L	PCT	W		L	PCT
Merrimack	17	–	3	.850	21	–	10	.677
Saint Peter's	14	–	6	.700	17	–	11	.607
Siena	13	–	7	.650	20	–	11	.645
Quinnipiac	12	–	8	.600	19	–	12	.613
Marist	12	–	8	.600	18	–	11	.621
Mount St. Mary's	11	–	9	.550	15	–	16	.484
Fairfield	11	–	9	.550	19	–	12	.613
Iona	10	–	10	.500	18	–	13	.581
Sacred Heart	9	–	11	.450	13	–	18	.419
Manhattan	8	–	12	.400	12	–	19	.387
Niagara	5	–	15	.250	8	–	22	.267
Canisius	5	–	15	.250	10	–	21	.323
Rider	3	–	17	.150	4	–	25	.138
† 2026 MAAC tournament winner As of March 1, 2026

The 2025–26 Canisius Golden Griffins men's basketball team represented Canisius University during the 2025–26 NCAA Division I men's basketball season. The Golden Griffins, led by second-year head coach Jim Christian, played their home games at the Koessler Athletic Center in Buffalo, New York as members of the Metro Atlantic Athletic Conference (MAAC).

Only the top 10 teams in the conference are eligible to participate in the 2026 MAAC tournament. With their loss to Manhattan on February 15, the Golden Griffins were mathematically eliminated from making the conference tournament, and therefore also eliminated from making the 2026 NCAA tournament.

== Previous season ==
The Golden Griffins finished the 2024–25 season 3–28, 3–17 in MAAC play, to finish in thirteenth (last) place. They failed to qualify for the 2025 MAAC tournament.

== Roster ==
2025–26 Canisius Golden Griffins men's basketball team
Players
Coaches

Pos.	#	Name	Height	Weight	Year	Previous school	Hometown
G	0	Chris Kumu	6 ft 4 in (1.93 m)	190 lb (86 kg)	Fr	Fort Erie Academy	Montreal, QC
G	1	Javante Edwards	6 ft 1 in (1.85 m)	175 lb (79 kg)	Fr	Carmen Northwest HS	Milwaukee, WI
G	2	Marcus Niblack	6 ft 2 in (1.88 m)	190 lb (86 kg)	GS	Jacksonville	Leesburg, FL
G	3	Anthony Benard	6 ft 0 in (1.83 m)	170 lb (77 kg)	Jr	Mercer	Detroit, MI
G	4	Nicco DiGiulio	5 ft 11 in (1.8 m)	170 lb (77 kg)	So	Williamsville South HS	Williamsville, NY
F	5	Myles Wilmoth	6 ft 10 in (2.08 m)	225 lb (102 kg)	GS	Siena	Chestnut Ridge, NY
G	6	Zach Christian	6 ft 3 in (1.91 m)	175 lb (79 kg)	Fr	Grand Island HS	Grand Island, NY
F	9	Evan van der Plas	6 ft 5 in (1.96 m)	190 lb (86 kg)	So	BC Triple Threat U-19	Rosmalen, Netherlands
G	11	Kahlil Singleton	6 ft 3 in (1.91 m)	195 lb (88 kg)	Jr	Holy Cross	Vancouver, WA
G	12	Trevor Augustine	6 ft 2 in (1.88 m)	180 lb (82 kg)	So	716 United	Grand Island, NY
F	13	Bryan Ndjonga	6 ft 9 in (2.06 m)	210 lb (95 kg)	Jr	Central Michigan	Yaoundé, Cameroon
G	15	Mike Evbagharu	6 ft 4 in (1.93 m)	220 lb (100 kg)	Jr	Central Arkansas	Scarborough, ON
G/F	21	Max Jusianiec	6 ft 7 in (2.01 m)	205 lb (93 kg)	GS	Mercyhurst	Alfred, NY
F	22	Brendan Oliver	6 ft 6 in (1.98 m)	195 lb (88 kg)	Fr	Blair Academy	West Orange, NJ
F	32	Andreo Ash	6 ft 8 in (2.03 m)	225 lb (102 kg)	Fr	Canterbury School	Liverpool, NY
F	34	King Ijeoma	6 ft 8 in (2.03 m)	220 lb (100 kg)	Sr	Livingstone	Houston, TX

Head coach

- Jim Christian (Rhode Island)

Assistant coach(es)

- Herschel Jenkins (Staten Island)
- Kian Boroujerdi (Texas)
- Jimmy Hall (Kent State)

Legend

- (C) Team captain
- (S) Suspended
- (I) Ineligible
- (W) Walk-on
- Injured
- Current redshirt

Roster
Last update: November 6, 2025

== Schedule and results ==
Date time, TV	Rank^{#}	Opponent^{#}	Result	Record	Site (attendance) city, state
Regular season
November 3, 2025*; 7:00 p.m., ESPN+		at Dayton	L 48–88	0–1	UD Arena (13,407); Dayton, OH
November 6, 2025*; 7:00 p.m., ESPN+		Allegheny	W 84–43	1–1	Koessler Athletic Center (674); Buffalo, NY
November 8, 2025*; 4:00 p.m., ESPN+		at St. Bonaventure	L 70–89	1–2	Reilly Center (3,549); St. Bonaventure, NY
November 12, 2025*; 7:00 p.m., ESPN+		Mercyhurst	W 58–55	2–2	Koessler Athletic Center (815); Buffalo, NY
November 17, 2025*; 7:00 p.m., ESPN+		at High Point	L 50–93	2–3	Qubein Center (2,603); High Point, NC
November 21, 2025*; 7:00 p.m., ESPN+		Maryland Eastern Shore; Queen City Classic	W 60–57	3–3	Koessler Athletic Center (577); Buffalo, NY
November 23, 2025*; 1:00 p.m., ESPN+		Binghamton; Queen City Classic	W 75–66	4–3	Koessler Athletic Center (677); Buffalo, NY
November 29, 2025*; 6:00 p.m., ESPN+		Buffalo	L 53–71	4–4	Koessler Athletic Center (1,503); Buffalo, NY
December 5, 2025; 7:00 p.m., ESPN+		at Saint Peter's	L 57–69	4–5 (0–1)	Run Baby Run Arena (558); Jersey City, NJ
December 7, 2025; 2:00 p.m., ESPN+		at Siena	L 52–74	4–6 (0–2)	MVP Arena (4,439); Albany, NY
December 13, 2025*; 2:00 p.m., ESPN+		at Maine	W 70–43	5–6	Memorial Gymnasium (1,190); Orono, ME
December 16, 2025*; 7:00 p.m., ESPN+		at Rhode Island	L 45–62	5–7	Ryan Center (2,895); Kingston, RI
December 22, 2025*; 7:00 p.m., ESPN+		at Duquesne	L 59–103	5–8	UPMC Cooper Fieldhouse (2,088); Pittsburgh, PA
January 2, 2026; 4:00 p.m., ESPN+		Fairfield	W 85–81	6–8 (1–2)	Koessler Athletic Center (787); Buffalo, NY
January 4, 2026; 12:00 p.m., ESPN+		Sacred Heart	W 82–78	7–8 (2–2)	Koessler Athletic Center (567); Buffalo, NY
January 9, 2026; 7:00 p.m., ESPN+		at Manhattan	W 70–64	8–8 (3–2)	Draddy Gymnasium (565); Riverdale, NY
January 11, 2026; 1:00 p.m., ESPN+		at Iona	L 48–74	8–9 (3–3)	Hynes Athletics Center (1,732); New Rochelle, NY
January 14, 2026; 7:00 p.m., ESPN+		Niagara; Battle of the Bridge	L 54–59	8–10 (3–4)	Koessler Athletic Center (1,315); Buffalo, NY
January 17, 2026; 12:00 p.m., ESPN+		Mount St. Mary's	L 68–78	8–11 (3–5)	Koessler Athletic Center (591); Buffalo, NY
January 22, 2026; 7:00 p.m., ESPN+		at Sacred Heart	L 66–69	8–12 (3–6)	William H. Pitt Center (773); Fairfield, CT
January 24, 2026; 7:00 p.m., ESPN+		at Fairfield	L 55–61	8–13 (3–7)	Leo D. Mahoney Arena (2,407); Fairfield, CT
January 30, 2026; 7:00 p.m., ESPN+		Marist	L 86–88 ^{OT}	8–14 (3–8)	Koessler Athletic Center (589); Buffalo, NY
February 1, 2026; 1:00 p.m., ESPN+		Siena	L 63–78	8–15 (3–9)	Koessler Athletic Center (829); Buffalo, NY
February 3, 2026; 6:30 p.m., ESPN+		at Niagara; Battle of the Bridge	L 56–65	8–16 (3–10)	Gallagher Center (1,246); Lewiston, NY
February 5, 2026; 7:00 p.m., ESPN+		at Quinnipiac	L 60–75	8–17 (3–11)	M&T Bank Arena (669); Hamden, CT
February 13, 2026; 7:00 p.m., ESPN+		Iona	L 63–69	8–18 (3–12)	Koessler Athletic Center (601); Buffalo, NY
February 15, 2026; 1:00 p.m., ESPN+		Manhattan	L 65–69	8–19 (3–13)	Koessler Athletic Center (551); Buffalo, NY
February 20, 2026; 7:00 p.m., ESPN+		at Rider	W 72–66	9–19 (4–13)	Alumni Gymnasium (1,008); Lawrenceville, NJ
February 22, 2026; 2:00 p.m., ESPN+		at Mount St. Mary's	L 47–68	9–20 (4–14)	Knott Arena (2,626); Emmitsburg, MD
February 27, 2026; 7:00 p.m., ESPN+		Merrimack	W 67–62	10–20 (5–14)	Koessler Athletic Center (553); Buffalo, NY
March 1, 2026; 1:00 p.m., ESPN+		Quinnipiac	L 63–67	10–21 (5–15)	Koessler Athletic Center (531); Buffalo, NY
*Non-conference game. ^{#}Rankings from AP poll. (#) Tournament seedings in parentheses. All times are in Eastern.
