= 2025–26 Fairfield Stags men's basketball team =

American college basketball season

2025–26 Fairfield Stags men's basketball
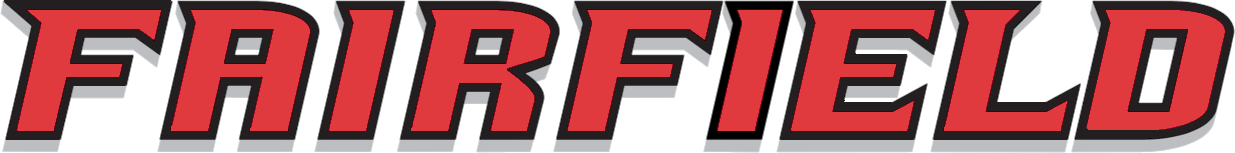
- Conference: Metro Atlantic Athletic Conference
- Record: 21–13 (11–9 MAAC)
- Head coach: Chris Casey (3rd season)
- Assistant coaches: Glenn Braica; Taj Benning; Matt Knezovic; Matt Scott
- Home arena: Leo D. Mahoney Arena

2025–26 MAAC men's basketball standings
	Conf.				Overall
Team	W		L	PCT	W		L	PCT
Merrimack	17	–	3	.850	23	–	11	.676
Saint Peter's	14	–	6	.700	17	–	12	.586
Siena †	13	–	7	.650	23	–	12	.657
Quinnipiac	12	–	8	.600	19	–	13	.594
Marist	12	–	8	.600	19	–	12	.613
Mount St. Mary's	11	–	9	.550	15	–	17	.469
Fairfield	11	–	9	.550	21	–	13	.618
Iona	10	–	10	.500	18	–	14	.563
Sacred Heart	9	–	11	.450	14	–	19	.424
Manhattan	8	–	12	.400	12	–	20	.375
Niagara	5	–	15	.250	8	–	22	.267
Canisius	5	–	15	.250	10	–	21	.323
Rider	3	–	17	.150	4	–	25	.138
† 2026 MAAC tournament winner

The 2025–26 Fairfield Stags men's basketball team represented Fairfield University during the 2025–26 NCAA Division I men's basketball season. The Stags, led by third-year head coach Chris Casey, played their home games at Leo D. Mahoney Arena in Fairfield, Connecticut as members of the Metro Atlantic Athletic Conference.

== Previous season ==
The Stags finished the 2024–25 season 12–20, 8–12 in MAAC play, to finish in tenth place. They were defeated by Sacred Heart in the first round of the MAAC tournament.

== Preseason ==
On September 30, 2025, the MAAC released their preseason coaches poll. Fairfield was picked to finish eighth in the conference.

=== Preseason rankings ===
MAAC Preseason Poll
Place	Team	Points
1	Quinnipiac	158 (8)
2	Siena	152 (3)
3	Sacred Heart	140 (2)
4	Manhattan	133
5	Marist	115
6	Iona	104
7	Merrimack	85
8	Fairfield	74
9	Mount St. Mary's	69
10	Rider	59
11	Saint Peter's	48
12	Niagara	26
13	Canisius	20
(#) first-place votes

=== Preseason All-MAAC Teams ===
Preseason All-MAAC Teams
Team	Player	Position	Year
Third	Deuce Turner	Guard	Graduate Student

== Roster ==
2025–26 Fairfield Stags men's basketball team
Players
Coaches

Pos.	#	Name	Height	Weight	Year	Previous school	Hometown
G	0	Eric Mejia	6 ft 3 in (1.91 m)	195 lb (88 kg)	So	Monroe	Washington Heights, New York
G	1	Deuce Turner	6 ft 2 in (1.88 m)	185 lb (84 kg)	GS	UC Santa Barbara	Coatesville, Pennsylvania
G	2	Nasir Rodriguez	6 ft 4 in (1.93 m)	210 lb (95 kg)	Fr	Northfield Mount Hermon School	Long Island City, New York
G	3	Cam Estevez	6 ft 4 in (1.93 m)	200 lb (91 kg)	Jr	Rhode Island	Harlem, New York
G	4	Braden Sparks	6 ft 0 in (1.83 m)	185 lb (84 kg)	Sr	Indian Hills Community College	Villa Rica, Georgia
G	5	Matt Curtis	6 ft 4 in (1.93 m)	185 lb (84 kg)	Jr	Avon Old Farms	Ellington, Connecticut
F	7	Ryan Zan	6 ft 6 in (1.98 m)	225 lb (102 kg)	RS Jr	La Salle	Princeton, New Jersey
G	8	Tony Williams	6 ft 1 in (1.85 m)	160 lb (73 kg)	Fr	Putnam Science Academy	Norwich, Connecticut
G/F	11	Halon Rawlins	6 ft 6 in (1.98 m)	220 lb (100 kg)	Fr	Nazareth Regional High School	Brooklyn, New York
G	13	Noah Best	6 ft 5 in (1.96 m)	175 lb (79 kg)	RS Jr	Fordham	Bronx, New York
F	15	Isaac Munkadi	6 ft 10 in (2.08 m)	200 lb (91 kg)	So	Bridgeport Prep	Kinshasa, Democratic Republic of the Congo
F	20	Brandon Benjamin	6 ft 8 in (2.03 m)	235 lb (107 kg)	Fr	St. Thomas More School	Newark, New Jersey
G	21	Tanner Ostop	6 ft 0 in (1.83 m)	165 lb (75 kg)	Jr	Northwest Catholic High School	West Hartford, Connecticut
G	22	Luke Davidson	6 ft 0 in (1.83 m)	185 lb (84 kg)	Sr	Fayetteville–Manlius High School	Fayetteville, New York
G	24	Joe Ganton	6 ft 4 in (1.93 m)	185 lb (84 kg)	Jr	West Essex High School	North Caldwell, New Jersey
G/F	25	Michael Rogan	6 ft 6 in (1.98 m)	210 lb (95 kg)	RS Jr	South Kent School	Saratoga Springs, New York
F	33	Peyton Smith	6 ft 10 in (2.08 m)	270 lb (122 kg)	Jr	Hudson Falls High School	Hudson Falls, New York
G/F	44	Declan Wucherpfennig	6 ft 7 in (2.01 m)	215 lb (98 kg)	Fr	Bergen Catholic High School	Teaneck, New Jersey

Head coach

- Chris Casey (Western Connecticut State)

Assistant coach(es)

- Glenn Braica (Queens College)
- Taj Benning (Fairfield)
- Matt Knezovic (Hartwick)
- Matt Scott (Niagara)

Legend

- (C) Team captain
- (S) Suspended
- (I) Ineligible
- (W) Walk-on
- Injured
- Current redshirt

Roster
Last update: November 13, 2025

== Schedule and results ==
Date time, TV	Rank^{#}	Opponent^{#}	Result	Record	Site (attendance) city, state
Exhibition
October 26, 2025*; 2:00 pm		at VCU	L 64–82	–	Siegel Center (6,080); Richmond, VA
Regular season
November 3, 2025*; 7:00 pm, B1G+		at Penn State	L 68–76	0–1	Bryce Jordan Center (5,547); University Park, PA
November 8, 2025*; 2:00 pm, ESPN+		at NJIT	W 74–53	1–1	Wellness and Events Center (1,454); Newark, NJ
November 10, 2025*; 7:00 pm, ESPN+		at Seton Hall	L 59–82	1–2	Walsh Gymnasium (1,297); South Orange, NJ
November 14, 2025*; 7:00 pm, ESPN+		Stonehill; Mahoney Classic	W 73–71 ^{OT}	2–2	Leo D. Mahoney Arena (2,151); Fairfield, CT
November 16, 2025*; 2:00 pm, ESPN+		Loyola (MD); Mahoney Classic	W 85–82	3–2	Leo D. Mahoney Arena (1,915); Fairfield, CT
November 22, 2025*; 1:00 pm, NECFR		at Le Moyne	W 97–83	4–2	Ted Grant Court (565); DeWitt, NY
November 26, 2025*; 7:00 pm, ESPN+		Columbia	L 77–106	4–3	Leo D. Mahoney Arena (1,529); Fairfield, CT
November 30, 2025*; 2:00 pm, ESPN+		New Hampshire	W 72–68	5–3	Leo D. Mahoney Arena (1,402); Fairfield, CT
December 5, 2025; 7:00 pm, ESPN+		at Manhattan	L 66–70	5–4 (0–1)	Draddy Gymnasium (547); Riverdale, NY
December 7, 2025; 12:00 pm, ESPN+		at Merrimack	L 63–74	5–5 (0–2)	Lawler Arena (1,193); North Andover, MA
December 14, 2025*; 2:00 pm, ESPN+		Monmouth	W 73–65	6–5	Leo D. Mahoney Arena (1,474); Fairfield, CT
December 18, 2025*; 7:00 pm, NECFR		at Central Connecticut	W 84–70	7–5	William H. Detrick Gymnasium; New Britain, CT
December 22, 2025*; 7:00 pm, ESPN+		CCNY	W 121–58	8–5	Leo D. Mahoney Arena (1,140); Fairfield, CT
December 29, 2025; 7:00 pm, ESPN+		Saint Peter's	L 66–70	8–6 (0–3)	Leo D. Mahoney Arena (1,772); Fairfield, CT
January 2, 2026; 4:00 pm, ESPN+		at Canisius	L 81–85	8–7 (0–4)	Koessler Athletic Center (787); Buffalo, NY
January 4, 2026; 2:00 pm, ESPN+		at Niagara	W 83–75	9–7 (1–4)	Gallagher Center (746); Lewiston, NY
January 9, 2026; 7:00 pm, ESPN+		Rider	W 68–62	10–7 (2–4)	Leo D. Mahoney Arena (1,706); Fairfield, CT
January 14, 2026; 7:00 pm, ESPN+		Manhattan	W 98–62	11–7 (3–4)	Leo D. Mahoney Arena (1,228); Fairfield, CT
January 17, 2026; 2:00 pm, ESPN+		at Marist	L 67–82	11–8 (3–5)	McCann Arena (941); Poughkeepsie, NY
January 19, 2026; 2:00 pm, ESPN+		at Siena	L 77–85	11–9 (3–6)	MVP Arena (6,385); Albany, NY
January 22, 2026; 7:00 pm, ESPN+		Niagara	W 62–61	12–9 (4–6)	Leo D. Mahoney Arena (1,541); Fairfield, CT
January 24, 2026; 7:00 pm, ESPN+		Canisius	W 61–55	13–9 (5–6)	Leo D. Mahoney Arena (2,407); Fairfield, CT
January 30, 2026; 7:00 pm, ESPN+		at Iona	W 71–70	14–9 (6–6)	Hynes Athletics Center (2,407); New Rochelle, NY
February 1, 2026; 2:00 pm, ESPN+		Quinnipiac	L 65–72	14–10 (6–7)	Leo D. Mahoney Arena (3,204); Fairfield, CT
February 5, 2026; 7:00 pm, ESPN+		at Sacred Heart	W 92–87	15–10 (7–7)	William H. Pitt Center (2,236); Fairfield, CT
February 7, 2026; 7:00 pm, ESPN+		Marist	W 63–60	16–10 (8–7)	Leo D. Mahoney Arena (2,090); Fairfield, CT
February 15, 2026; 2:00 pm, ESPN+		at Saint Peter's	L 74–83	16–11 (8–8)	Run Baby Run Arena (875); Jersey City, NJ
February 20, 2026; 7:00 pm, ESPN+		Sacred Heart	W 78–68	17–11 (9–8)	Leo D. Mahoney Arena (3,565); Fairfield, CT
February 22, 2026; 2:00 pm, ESPN+		at Quinnipiac	W 85–79	18–11 (10–8)	M&T Bank Arena (1,474); Hamden, CT
February 27, 2026; 7:00 pm, ESPN+		Siena	W 72–58	19–11 (11–8)	Leo D. Mahoney Arena (2,425); Fairfield, CT
March 1, 2026; 2:00 pm, ESPN+		Mount St. Mary's	L 47–69	19–12 (11–9)	Leo D. Mahoney Arena (2,713); Fairfield, CT
MAAC tournament
March 5, 2026; 8:30 pm, ESPN+	(7)	vs. (10) Manhattan; First round	W 71–60	20–12	Boardwalk Hall (1,037); Atlantic City, NJ
March 6, 2026; 8:30 pm, ESPN+	(7)	vs. (2) Saint Peter's; Quarterfinals	W 74–55	21–12	Boardwalk Hall (1,565); Atlantic City, NJ
March 8, 2026; 8:30 pm, ESPN+	(7)	vs. (3) Siena; Quarterfinals	L 61–76	21–13	Boardwalk Hall (1,395); Atlantic City, NJ
*Non-conference game. ^{#}Rankings from AP Poll. (#) Tournament seedings in parentheses. All times are in Eastern.
