= 2025–26 Iona Gaels men's basketball team =

American college basketball season

2025–26 Iona Gaels men's basketball
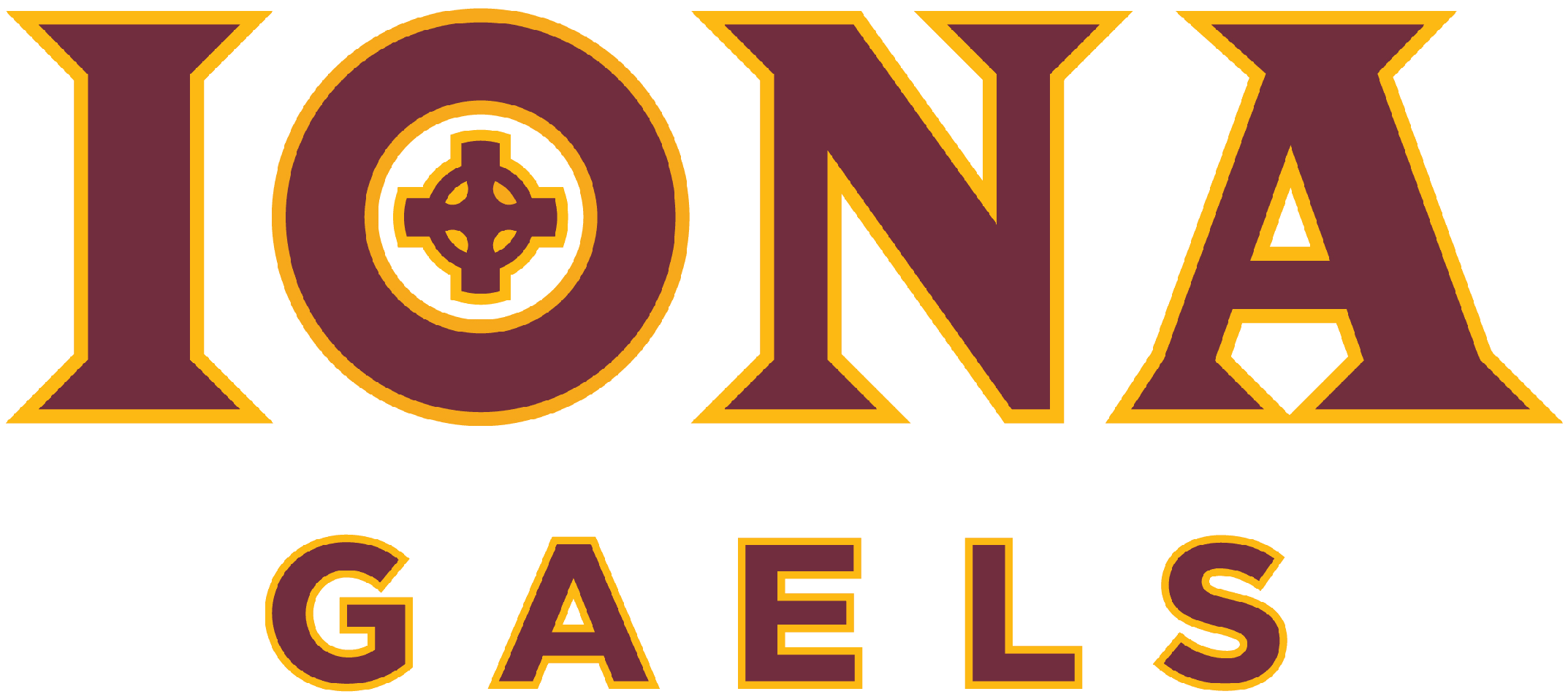
- Conference: Metro Atlantic Athletic Conference
- Record: 18–14 (10–10 MAAC)
- Head coach: Dan Geriot (1st season)
- Assistant coaches: Patrick Wallace; Ronald Ramón; Kris Saulny; Michael Thompson
- Home arena: Hynes Athletics Center

2025–26 MAAC men's basketball standings
	Conf.				Overall
Team	W		L	PCT	W		L	PCT
Merrimack	17	–	3	.850	21	–	10	.677
Saint Peter's	14	–	6	.700	17	–	11	.607
Siena	13	–	7	.650	20	–	11	.645
Quinnipiac	12	–	8	.600	19	–	12	.613
Marist	12	–	8	.600	18	–	11	.621
Mount St. Mary's	11	–	9	.550	15	–	16	.484
Fairfield	11	–	9	.550	20	–	12	.625
Iona	10	–	10	.500	18	–	14	.563
Sacred Heart	9	–	11	.450	14	–	18	.438
Manhattan	8	–	12	.400	12	–	20	.375
Niagara	5	–	15	.250	8	–	22	.267
Canisius	5	–	15	.250	10	–	21	.323
Rider	3	–	17	.150	4	–	25	.138
† 2026 MAAC tournament winner As of March 5, 2026

The 2025–26 Iona Gaels men's basketball team represented Iona University during the 2025–26 NCAA Division I men's basketball season. The Gaels, led by first-year head coach Dan Geriot, played their home games at the Hynes Athletics Center in New Rochelle, New York as members of the Metro Atlantic Athletic Conference.

== Previous season ==
The Gaels finished the 2024–25 season 17–17, 12–8 in MAAC play, to finish in a tie for fourth place. They defeated Manhattan and Quinnipiac, before falling to Mount St. Mary's in the MAAC tournament championship game.

On March 17, 2025, the school announced that they would be firing head coach Tobin Anderson, after only two years at the helm. On March 20, the school named New Orleans Pelicans assistant coach Dan Geriot the team's new head coach.

== Preseason ==
On September 30, 2025, the MAAC released their preseason coaches poll. Iona was picked to finish sixth in the conference.

=== Preseason rankings ===
MAAC Preseason Poll
Place	Team	Points
1	Quinnipiac	158 (8)
2	Siena	152 (3)
3	Sacred Heart	140 (2)
4	Manhattan	133
5	Marist	115
6	Iona	104
7	Merrimack	85
8	Fairfield	74
9	Mount St. Mary's	69
10	Rider	59
11	Saint Peter's	48
12	Niagara	26
13	Canisius	20
(#) first-place votes

=== Preseason All-MAAC Teams ===
No players were named to the First, Second or Third Preseason All-MAAC Teams.

== Roster ==
2025–26 Iona Gaels men's basketball team
Players
Coaches

Pos.	#	Name	Height	Weight	Year	Previous school	Hometown
G	0	Keshawn Williams	6 ft 4 in (1.93 m)	175 lb (79 kg)	GS	Colorado State	Chicago Heights, Illinois
F	1	Matt Reed	6 ft 10 in (2.08 m)	230 lb (104 kg)	Jr	Tulsa	Carrollton, Texas
G	2	Denver Anglin	6 ft 1 in (1.85 m)	185 lb (84 kg)	Jr	Rice	Montclair, New Jersey
G	3	Chase Cormier	6 ft 2 in (1.88 m)	183 lb (83 kg)	Jr	Wofford	Atlanta, Georgia
G	4	Khalil Badru	6 ft 5 in (1.96 m)	192 lb (87 kg)	So	New Hampshire	New Britain, Connecticut
F	5	Deondrea Lindsey	6 ft 8 in (2.03 m)	212 lb (96 kg)	Fr	Oak Hill Academy	Knoxville, Tennessee
F	7	Luke Jungers	6 ft 9 in (2.06 m)	220 lb (100 kg)	Sr	Omaha	Omaha, Nebraska
F	9	Lamin Sabally	6 ft 8 in (2.03 m)	215 lb (98 kg)	Sr	Incarnate Word	Berlin, Germany
G	11	CJ Anthony	6 ft 0 in (1.83 m)	195 lb (88 kg)	GS	Cincinnati	Columbus, Ohio
G	12	Oscar Hourruitiner Jr.	6 ft 0 in (1.83 m)	165 lb (75 kg)	Fr	DME Academy	Gurabo, Puerto Rico
G	13	Kosy Akametu	6 ft 5 in (1.96 m)	215 lb (98 kg)	Jr	Santa Clara	Carson, California
G	16	Marko Pandiloski	6 ft 6 in (1.98 m)	200 lb (91 kg)	Fr	Hoosac School	Mississauga, Ontario
F	21	Ore Odutayo	6 ft 8 in (2.03 m)	210 lb (95 kg)	Fr	Williston Northampton School	Albany, New York
F	30	Toby Harris	6 ft 8 in (2.03 m)	225 lb (102 kg)	GS	Brandeis	Durham, North Carolina
F	31	Connor Horan	6 ft 8 in (2.03 m)	230 lb (104 kg)	RS Fr	Blue Ridge School	Fairfax, Virginia
F	44	Alliou Fall	6 ft 10 in (2.08 m)	230 lb (104 kg)	Fr	RIG Luleå	Stockholm, Sweden

Head coach

- Dan Geriot (Richmond)

Assistant coach(es)

- Patrick Wallace (Charleston Southern)
- Ronald Ramón (Pittsburgh)
- Kris Saulny (Widener)
- Michael Thompson (Northwestern)

Legend

- (C) Team captain
- (S) Suspended
- (I) Ineligible
- (W) Walk-on
- Injured
- Current redshirt

Roster
Last update: November 11, 2025

== Schedule and results ==
Date time, TV	Rank^{#}	Opponent^{#}	Result	Record	Site (attendance) city, state
Regular season
November 7, 2025*; 7:00 pm, ESPN+		Hofstra	W 81–73	1–0	Hynes Athletics Center (2,327); New Rochelle, NY
November 11, 2025*; 1:00 pm, Midco Sports Plus		at Kansas City	W 105–91	2–0	Swinney Recreation Center (525); Kansas City, MO
November 14, 2025*; 7:00 pm, ESPN+		Fordham	W 76–71	3–0	Hynes Athletics Center (2,578); New Rochelle, NY
November 18, 2025*; 7:00 pm, ESPN+		Princeton	W 89–69	4–0	Hynes Athletics Center (1,692); New Rochelle, NY
November 21, 2025*; 5:30 pm, ESPN+		vs. Akron; Paradise Jam quarterfinals	L 75–96	4–1	UVI Sports and Fitness Center; St. Thomas, USVI
November 22, 2025*; 5:30 pm, ESPN+		vs. Oregon State; Paradise Jam consolation semifinal	W 91–84 ^{2OT}	5–1	UVI Sports and Fitness Center (1,824); St. Thomas, USVI
November 24, 2025*; 3:00 pm, ESPN+		vs. Green Bay; Paradise Jam 5th place game	L 75–80	5–2	UVI Sports and Fitness Center (324); St. Thomas, USVI
December 1, 2025*; 7:00 pm, ESPN+		at Delaware	W 89–66	6–2	Bob Carpenter Center (2,032); Newark, DE
December 5, 2025; 7:00 pm, ESPN+		Quinnipiac	L 68–89	6–3 (0–1)	Hynes Athletics Center (2,242); New Rochelle, NY
December 7, 2025; 2:00 pm, ESPN+		at Sacred Heart	W 81–69	7–3 (1–1)	William H. Pitt Center (822); Fairfield, CT
December 10, 2025*; 7:00 pm, ESPN+		Bryant	W 69−63	8−3	Hynes Athletics Center (1,347); New Rochelle, NY
December 13, 2025*; 12:00 pm, TNT/truTV		at No. 22 St. John's	L 64−91	8−4	Madison Square Garden (15,803); New York, NY
December 20, 2025*; 2:00 pm, ESPN+		at Vermont	W 83−78	9−4	Patrick Gym (2,180); Burlington, VT
December 29, 2025; 7:00 pm, ESPN+		at Mount St. Mary's	L 59−66	9−5 (1−2)	Knott Arena (2,176); Emmitsburg, MD
January 2, 2026; 7:00 pm, ESPN+		Siena	W 75−72	10−5 (2−2)	Hynes Athletics Center (1,545); New Rochelle, NY
January 4, 2026; 2:00 pm, ESPN+		at Marist	L 38−83	10−6 (2−3)	McCann Arena (1,861); Poughkeepsie, NY
January 9, 2026; 7:00 pm, ESPN+		Niagara	W 71–53	11–6 (3–3)	Hynes Athletics Center (1,741); New Rochelle, NY
January 11, 2026; 1:00 pm, ESPN+		Canisius	W 74–48	12–6 (4–3)	Hynes Athletics Center (1,732); New Rochelle, NY
January 14, 2026; 7:00 pm, ESPN+		at Rider	L 68–72	12–7 (4–4)	Alumni Gymnasium (872); Lawrenceville, NJ
January 19, 2026; 2:00 pm, ESPN+		at Saint Peter's	L 63–77	12–8 (4–5)	Run Baby Run Arena (564); Jersey City, NJ
January 22, 2026; 7:00 pm, ESPN+		Merrimack	W 61–60	13–8 (5–5)	Hynes Athletics Center (1,820); New Rochelle, NY
January 24, 2026; 7:00 pm, ESPN+		Manhattan	W 66–57	14–8 (6–5)	Hynes Athletics Center (2,103); New Rochelle, NY
January 30, 2026; 7:00 pm, ESPN+		Fairfield	L 70–71	14–9 (6–6)	Hynes Athletics Center (1,978); New Rochelle, NY
February 5, 2026; 7:00 pm, ESPNU		at Siena	L 72−79	14−10 (6−7)	MVP Arena (5,140); Albany, NY
February 7, 2026; 7:00 pm, ESPN+		Mount St. Mary's	L 76–83	14–11 (6–8)	Hynes Athletics Center (1,949); New Rochelle, NY
February 13, 2026; 7:00 pm, ESPN+		at Canisius	W 69–63	15–11 (7–8)	Koessler Athletic Center (601); Buffalo, NY
February 15, 2026; 2:00 pm, ESPN+		at Niagara	L 68–70	15–12 (7–9)	Gallagher Center (836); Lewiston, NY
February 20, 2026; 7:00 pm, ESPN+		Saint Peter's	W 72–64 ^{OT}	16–12 (8–9)	Hynes Athletics Center (1,797); New Rochelle, NY
February 22, 2026; 1:00 pm, ESPN+		at Merrimack	L 86–88 ^{2OT}	16–13 (8–10)	Lawler Arena (2,109); North Andover, MA
February 27, 2026; 7:00 pm, ESPN+		Rider	W 80–58	17–13 (9–10)	Hynes Athletics Center (2,159); New Rochelle, NY
March 1, 2026; 2:00 pm, ESPNU/ESPN+		at Manhattan	W 69–65	18–13 (10–10)	Draddy Gymnasium (1,900); Riverdale, NY
MAAC tournament
March 5, 2026; 6:00 pm, ESPN+	(8)	vs. (9) Sacred Heart; First round	L 81–90	18–14	Boardwalk Hall (1,037); Atlantic City, NJ
*Non-conference game. ^{#}Rankings from AP Poll. (#) Tournament seedings in parentheses. All times are in Eastern.
