= 2025–26 Delaware Fightin' Blue Hens men's basketball team =

American college basketball season

2025–26 Delaware Fightin' Blue Hens men's basketball
- Conference: Conference USA
- Record: 10–21 (6–14 C-USA)
- Head coach: Martin Ingelsby (10th season)
- Associate head coach: Bill Phillips
- Assistant coaches: Antoni Wyche; Danny O'Connor; Christian Nunez
- Home arena: Bob Carpenter Center

2025–26 Conference USA men's basketball standings
	Conf.				Overall
Team	W		L	PCT	W		L	PCT
Liberty	17	–	3	.850	25	–	6	.806
Sam Houston	13	–	7	.650	21	–	10	.677
Western Kentucky	11	–	9	.550	18	–	13	.581
Louisiana Tech	11	–	9	.550	18	–	13	.581
Middle Tennessee	11	–	9	.550	17	–	14	.548
Kennesaw State	10	–	10	.500	18	–	13	.581
Jacksonville State	10	–	10	.500	15	–	16	.484
FIU	8	–	12	.400	15	–	16	.484
Missouri State	8	–	12	.400	14	–	17	.452
New Mexico State	8	–	12	.400	15	–	15	.500
UTEP	7	–	13	.350	11	–	20	.355
Delaware	6	–	14	.300	10	–	21	.323
† 2026 CUSA tournament winner As of March 7, 2026

The 2025–26 Delaware Fightin' Blue Hens men's basketball team represented the University of Delaware during the 2025–26 NCAA Division I men's basketball season. The Fightin' Blue Hens, led by tenth-year head coach Martin Ingelsby, played their home games at the Bob Carpenter Center in Newark, Delaware as first-year full members of Conference USA.

== Previous season ==
The Fightin' Blue Hens finished the 2024–25 season 16–20, 5–13 in CAA play to finish in twelfth place. They defeated Stony Brook, Campbell, William & Mary, and Towson before falling to UNC Wilmington in the finals of the CAA tournament.

== Roster ==
2025–26 Delaware Fightin' Blue Hens men's basketball team
Players
Coaches

Pos.	#	Name	Height	Weight	Year	Previous school	Hometown
G	00	Christian Bliss	6 ft 4 in (1.93 m)	190 lb (86 kg)	Jr	Virginia	Queens, New York
G	1	Mason Ellison	6 ft 4 in (1.93 m)	170 lb (77 kg)	Fr	Loyola Blakefield	Edgewood, Maryland
G	3	Cavan Reilly	6 ft 4 in (1.93 m)	200 lb (91 kg)	Sr	Bishop O'Connell HS	Lovettsville, Virginia
G	4	Justyn Fernandez	6 ft 5 in (1.96 m)	210 lb (95 kg)	Sr	Providence	Richmond, Virginia
F	5	Macon Emory	6 ft 8 in (2.03 m)	200 lb (91 kg)	So	Perkiomen School	Devon, Pennsylvania
G	10	Brandon Baffone	6 ft 1 in (1.85 m)	175 lb (79 kg)	Jr	Salesianum School	Hockessin, Delaware
F	11	Jayden Taylor	6 ft 8 in (2.03 m)	185 lb (84 kg)	Fr	Sanford School	Newark, Delaware
G	12	Alex McFadden	6 ft 1 in (1.85 m)	175 lb (79 kg)	So	Radnor HS	Wayne, Pennsylvania
F	15	Houston Emory	6 ft 9 in (2.06 m)	205 lb (93 kg)	Sr	Blue Ridge School	Devon, Pennsylvania
G	20	Alex Kazanecki	6 ft 6 in (1.98 m)	190 lb (86 kg)	Fr	Archbishop Moeller	Morrow, Ohio
G	21	Nnanna Njoku	6 ft 9 in (2.06 m)	250 lb (113 kg)	GS	Villanova	Bear, Delaware
F	35	Bouna Kebe	6 ft 9 in (2.06 m)	216 lb (98 kg)	Sr	Memphis	Dakar, Senegal
F	44	Tyler Houser	6 ft 9 in (2.06 m)	235 lb (107 kg)	Sr	VMI	Camp Hill, Pennsylvania
G	55	Jameel Brown	6 ft 4 in (1.93 m)	200 lb (91 kg)	Sr	Temple	Philadelphia, Pennsylvania

Head coach

- Martin Ingelsby (Notre Dame)

Assistant coach(es)

- Bill Phillips (Saint Joseph's)
- Antoni Wyche (Notre Dame)
- Danny O'Connor (Indiana)
- Christian Nunez (Farmingdale State)

Legend

- (C) Team captain
- (S) Suspended
- (I) Ineligible
- (W) Walk-on
- Injured
- Current redshirt

Roster
Last update: September 30, 2025

== Schedule and results ==
Date time, TV	Rank^{#}	Opponent^{#}	Result	Record	Site (attendance) city, state
Exhibition
Octoboer 25, 2025*; 1:00 p.m., ESPN+		at Saint Joseph's	L 65–86		Hagan Arena; Philadelphia, PA
Non-conference regular season
November 3, 2025*; 7:00 p.m., ESPN+		at Bucknell	L 70–78	0–1	Sojka Pavilion (1,431); Lewisburg, PA
November 7, 2025*; 11:00 a.m., ESPN+		Wilmington (Division II)	L 62–71	0–2	Bob Carpenter Center (1,187); Newark, DE
November 11, 2025*; 9:00 p.m., CBSSN		at No. 7 BYU	L 68−85	0−3	Marriott Center (18,299); Provo, UT
November 18, 2025*; 7:00 p.m., ESPN+		Saint Peter's	W 81–70	1–3	Bob Carpenter Center (1,600); Newark, DE
November 23, 2025*; 3:00 p.m., PTB Live		vs. Southern Illinois; Jacksonville Classic	L 59–79	1–4	Edward Waters University (346); Jacksonville, FL
November 25, 2025*; 1:30 p.m., PTB Live		vs. UNC Greensboro; Jacksonville Classic	W 73–60	2–4	Edward Waters University (146); Jacksonville, FL
December 1, 2025*; 7:00 p.m., ESPN+		Iona	L 66–89	2–5	Bob Carpenter Center (2,032); Newark, DE
December 6, 2025*; 2:00 p.m., ESPN+		at Delaware State	L 72–75 ^{OT}	2–6	Memorial Hall (400); Dover, DE
December 10, 2025*; 7:00 p.m., ESPN+		at George Washington	W 70–58	3–6	Charles E. Smith Center (1,849); Washington, D.C.
December 13, 2025*; 1:00 p.m., ESPN+		Cal State Northridge	L 66–88	3–7	Bob Carpenter Center (1,517); Newark, DE
December 16, 2025*; 7:00 p.m., ESPN+		Rider	W 65–57	4–7	Bob Carpenter Center (1,189); Newark, DE
C-USA regular season
December 29, 2025; 2:00 p.m., ESPN+		Missouri State	L 43–61	4–8 (0–1)	Bob Carpenter Center (1,818); Newark, DE
January 2, 2026; 7:00 p.m., ESPN+		Jacksonville State	L 64–67	4–9 (0–2)	Bob Carpenter Center (1,686); Newark, DE
January 4, 2026; 2:00 p.m., ESPN+		Kennesaw State	W 67–52	5–9 (1–2)	Bob Carpenter Center (1,439); Newark, DE
January 8, 2026; 7:30 p.m., ESPN+		at Sam Houston	L 60–72	5–10 (1–3)	Bernard Johnson Coliseum (875); Huntsville, TX
January 10, 2026; 3:00 p.m., ESPN+		at Louisiana Tech	L 68–70 ^{OT}	5–11 (1–4)	Thomas Assembly Center (2,166); Ruston, LA
January 15, 2026; 7:00 p.m., ESPN+		UTEP	L 69–70	5–12 (1–5)	Bob Carpenter Center (2,113); Newark, DE
January 17, 2026; 2:00 p.m., ESPN+		New Mexico State	L 68–97	5–13 (1–6)	Bob Carpenter Center (2,560); Newark, DE
January 24, 2026; 6:00 p.m., ESPN+		at Liberty	L 51–67	5–14 (1–7)	Liberty Arena (3,475); Lynchburg, VA
January 28, 2026; 9:00 p.m., ESPN+		at New Mexico State	W 73–64	6–14 (2–7)	Pan American Center (5,538); Las Cruces, NM
January 31, 2026; 9:00 p.m., ESPN+		at UTEP	L 55–70	6–15 (2–8)	Don Haskins Center (4,077); El Paso, TX
February 4, 2026; 7:00 p.m., ESPN+		Liberty	L 69–75	6–16 (2–9)	Bob Carpenter Center (2,084); Newark, DE
February 7, 2026; 1:00 p.m., ESPN+		Middle Tennessee	W 89–88	7–16 (3–9)	Bob Carpenter Center (2,460); Newark, DE
February 12, 2026; 7:00 p.m., ESPN+		at FIU	W 68–66	8–16 (4–9)	Ocean Bank Convocation Center (540); Miami, FL
February 14, 2026; 3:00 p.m., ESPN+		at Missouri State	W 76–67	9–16 (5–9)	Great Southern Bank Arena (2,157); Springfield, MO
February 18, 2026; 7:00 p.m., ESPN+		Western Kentucky	L 87–88 ^{OT}	9–17 (5–10)	Bob Carpenter Center (2,250); Newark, DE
February 21, 2026; 2:00 p.m., ESPN+		at Middle Tennessee	L 66–78	9–18 (5–11)	Murphy Center (4,150); Murfreesboro, TN
February 26, 2026; 7:00 p.m., CBSSN		at Jacksonville State	L 70–80 ^{OT}	9–19 (5–12)	Pete Mathews Coliseum (873); Jacksonville, AL
February 28, 2026; 5:00 p.m., ESPN+		at Kennesaw State	L 82–90	9–20 (5–13)	Convocation Center (1,633); Kennesaw, GA
March 5, 2026; 7:00 p.m., CBSSN		Sam Houston	W 83–80	10–20 (6–13)	Bob Carpenter Center (2,041); Newark, DE
March 7, 2026; 12:00 p.m., ESPN+		Louisiana Tech	L 38–81	10−21 (6−14)	Bob Carpenter Center (2,369); Newark, DE
*Non-conference game. ^{#}Rankings from AP Poll. (#) Tournament seedings in parentheses. All times are in Eastern.
