= 2025–26 Marist Red Foxes men's basketball team =

American college basketball season

2025–26 Marist Red Foxes men's basketball
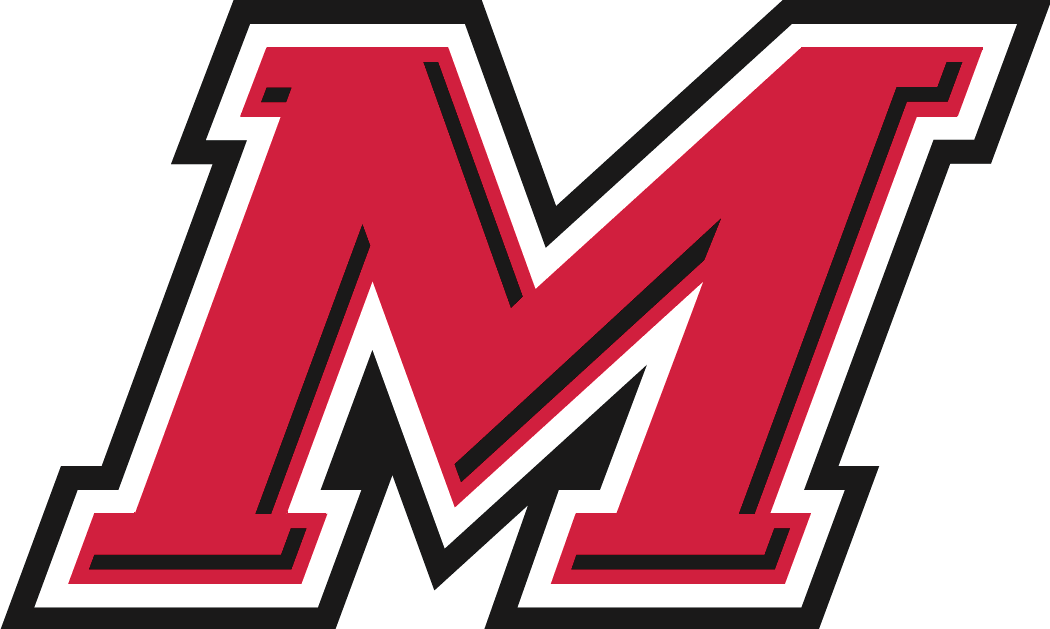
- Conference: Metro Atlantic Athletic Conference
- Record: 19–12 (12–8 MAAC)
- Head coach: John Dunne (8th season)
- Associate head coach: Dalip Bhatia
- Assistant coaches: Curtis Wilson; Brandon Hall; Dan Bozzelli
- Home arena: McCann Arena

2025–26 MAAC men's basketball standings
	Conf.				Overall
Team	W		L	PCT	W		L	PCT
Merrimack	17	–	3	.850	23	–	10	.697
Saint Peter's	14	–	6	.700	17	–	12	.586
Siena	13	–	7	.650	22	–	11	.667
Quinnipiac	12	–	8	.600	19	–	13	.594
Marist	12	–	8	.600	19	–	12	.613
Mount St. Mary's	11	–	9	.550	15	–	17	.469
Fairfield	11	–	9	.550	21	–	13	.618
Iona	10	–	10	.500	18	–	14	.563
Sacred Heart	9	–	11	.450	14	–	19	.424
Manhattan	8	–	12	.400	12	–	20	.375
Niagara	5	–	15	.250	8	–	22	.267
Canisius	5	–	15	.250	10	–	21	.323
Rider	3	–	17	.150	4	–	25	.138
† 2026 MAAC tournament winner As of March 8, 2026

The 2025–26 Marist Red Foxes men's basketball team represented Marist University during the 2025–26 NCAA Division I men's basketball season. The Red Foxes, led by eighth-year head coach John Dunne, played their home games at the McCann Arena in Poughkeepsie, New York as members of the Metro Atlantic Athletic Conference (MAAC).

== Previous season ==
The Red Foxes finished the 2024–25 season 20–10, 13–7 in MAAC play, to finish in a three-way tie for third place. They were upset by Mount St. Mary's in the first round of the MAAC tournament.

== Roster ==
2025–26 Marist Red Foxes men's basketball team
Players
Coaches

Pos.	#	Name	Height	Weight	Year	Previous school	Hometown
G	0	Jadin Collins-Roberts	6 ft 1 in (1.85 m)	175 lb (79 kg)	Jr	Rutgers Prep	Edison, NJ
C	1	Jason Schofield	6 ft 10 in (2.08 m)	240 lb (109 kg)	RS So	South Kent School	Poughkeepsie, NY
G	2	Justin Menard	6 ft 3 in (1.91 m)	185 lb (84 kg)	So	Iona	Higganum, CT
G	4	Rhyjon Blackwell	6 ft 0 in (1.83 m)	175 lb (79 kg)	GS	USC Aiken	Baldwin, NY
F	5	Myles Parker	6 ft 8 in (2.03 m)	195 lb (88 kg)	Fr	Rutgers Prep	Plainfield, NJ
G	7	Martin Kawa	6 ft 4 in (1.93 m)	195 lb (88 kg)	Sr	Richard Bland College	Stafford, VA
G	8	Ricky McKenzie	6 ft 5 in (1.96 m)	200 lb (91 kg)	RS Fr	Kennesaw State	Marietta, GA
F	10	Trace Salton	6 ft 5 in (1.96 m)	188 lb (85 kg)	Sr	Bridgton Academy	Lake Oswego, OR
F	11	Jaden Daughtry	6 ft 7 in (2.01 m)	205 lb (93 kg)	Sr	St. Francis Prep	Queens, NY
G	13	Elijah Lewis	6 ft 5 in (1.96 m)	180 lb (82 kg)	Sr	Adelphi	Watchung, NJ
F	15	Parby Kabamba	6 ft 6 in (1.98 m)	225 lb (102 kg)	So	South Kent School	Kinshasa, DR Congo
C	21	Jordan Gabriel	6 ft 9 in (2.06 m)	225 lb (102 kg)	Fr	Perkiomen School	Mineola, NY
C	25	Tarik Watson	6 ft 8 in (2.03 m)	225 lb (102 kg)	So	Hillcrest Prep	Middletown, NY
G	31	Antoni Vlogianitis	6 ft 4 in (1.93 m)	187 lb (85 kg)	So	Avon Old Farms	Garden City, NY

Head coach

- John Dunne (Ithaca)

Assistant coach(es)

- Dalip Bhatia (Rutgers)
- Curtis Wilson (Adelphi)
- Brandon Hall (Saint Peter's)
- Dan Bozzelli (SUNY Cortland)

Legend

- (C) Team captain
- (S) Suspended
- (I) Ineligible
- (W) Walk-on
- Injured
- Current redshirt

Roster
Last update: November 9, 2025

== Schedule and results ==
Date time, TV	Rank^{#}	Opponent^{#}	Result	Record	High points	High rebounds	High assists	Site (attendance) city, state
Regular season
November 3, 2025*; 7:15 p.m., ESPN+		at Xavier	L 62–66	0–1	24 – Blackwell	7 – Lewis	4 – 2 tied	Cintas Center (9,776); Cincinnati, OH
November 9, 2025*; 2:00 p.m., ESPN+		at Dartmouth	W 75–56	1–1	16 – Blackwell	7 – 2 tied	8 – Menard	Leede Arena (894); Hanover, NH
November 12, 2025*; 7:00 p.m., ESPN+		Vassar	W 93–61	2–1	16 – Menard	7 – Parker	6 – Blackwell	McCann Arena (1,653); Poughkeepsie, NY
November 16, 2025*; 5:00 p.m., ESPN+		Harvard	L 54–56	2–2	17 – Kabamba	6 – Daughtry	5 – Daughtry	McCann Arena (1,884); Poughkeepsie, NY
November 21, 2025*; 7:00 p.m., ESPN+		Army	W 76–65	3–2	17 – Parker	7 – Lewis	6 – Menard	McCann Arena (1,920); Poughkeepsie, NY
November 25, 2025*; 7:00 p.m., ESPN+		Lehigh	W 78–55	4–2	17 – Menard	8 – Daughtry	5 – Collins-Roberts	McCann Arena (790); Poughkeepsie, NY
December 5, 2025; 7:00 p.m., ESPN+		Mount St. Mary's	W 64–56	5–2 (1–0)	16 – Blackwell	5 – 3 tied	3 – 2 tied	McCann Arena (1,759); Poughkeepsie, NY
December 7, 2025; 2:00 p.m., ESPN+		Manhattan	W 80–68	6–2 (2–0)	22 – Lewis	8 – 2 tied	11 – Menard	McCann Arena (1,356); Poughkeepsie, NY
December 13, 2025*; 4:00 p.m., ESPN+		at Bryant	W 82–74	7–2	27 – Menard	4 – 4 tied	4 – Collins-Roberts	Chace Athletic Center (674); Smithfield, RI
December 16, 2025*; 7:30 p.m., ACCNX		at Georgia Tech	L 76–87	7–3	19 – Lewis	6 – Daughtry	7 – Collins-Roberts	McCamish Pavilion (5,674); Atlanta, GA
December 21, 2025*; 1:00 p.m., ESPN+		Stony Brook	W 70–51	8–3	17 – Blackwell	9 – Daughtry	3 – 2 tied	McCann Arena (1,322); Poughkeepsie, NY
December 29, 2025; 4:00 p.m., ESPN+		at Quinnipiac	L 58–64	8–4 (2–1)	14 – Watson	8 – Watson	4 – Menard	M&T Bank Arena (1,277); Hamden, CT
January 2, 2026; 7:00 p.m., ESPN+		at Saint Peter's	L 59–69	8–5 (2–2)	13 – 2 tied	7 – Lewis	3 – Daughtry	Run Baby Run Arena (633); Jersey City, NJ
January 4, 2026; 2:00 p.m., ESPN+		Iona	W 83–38	9–5 (3–2)	17 – Blackwell	7 – Collins-Roberts	5 – Menard	McCann Arena (1,861); Poughkeepsie, NY
January 9, 2026; 7:00 p.m., ESPN+		at Sacred Heart	W 76–72	10–5 (4–2)	19 – Collins-Roberts	8 – Daughtry	4 – Menard	William H. Pitt Center (849); Fairfield, CT
January 11, 2026; 2:00 p.m., ESPN+		at Rider	W 71–49	11–5 (5–2)	15 – Menard	10 – Daughtry	4 – Collins-Roberts	Alumni Gymnasium (1,008); Lawrenceville, NJ
January 17, 2026; 2:00 p.m., ESPN+		Fairfield	W 82–67	12–5 (6–2)	17 – Lewis	6 – Daughtry	7 – Collins-Roberts	McCann Arena (941); Poughkeepsie, NY
January 19, 2026; 2:00 p.m., ESPN+		Merrimack	L 55–68	12–6 (6–3)	15 – Schofield	5 – Blackwell	5 – Lewis	McCann Arena (1,542); Poughkeepsie, NY
January 22, 2026; 7:00 p.m., ESPN+		at Siena	L 50–69	12–7 (6–4)	13 – Blackwell	5 – Daughtry	5 – Menard	MVP Arena (4,768); Albany, NY
January 24, 2026; 1:00 p.m., ESPN+		Quinnipiac	W 71–64	13–7 (7–4)	15 – Menard	8 – Kabamba	4 – Collins-Roberts	McCann Arena (1,520); Poughkeepsie, NY
January 30, 2026; 7:00 p.m., ESPN+		at Canisius	W 88–86 ^{OT}	14–7 (8–4)	22 – Menard	9 – Lewis	5 – Lewis	Koessler Athletic Center (589); Buffalo, NY
February 1, 2026; 2:00 p.m., ESPN+		at Niagara	W 58–46	15–7 (9–4)	13 – Blackwell	7 – Kabamba	4 – Menard	Gallagher Center (745); Niagara Falls, NY
February 5, 2026; 7:00 p.m., ESPN+		Rider	W 81–52	16–7 (10–4)	23 – Blackwell	5 – Menard	9 – Menard	McCann Arena (1,326); Poughkeepsie, NY
February 7, 2026; 7:00 p.m., ESPN+		at Fairfield	L 60–63	16–8 (10–5)	18 – Menard	6 – Menard	4 – Blackwell	Leo D. Mahoney Arena (2,090); Fairfield, CT
February 12, 2026; 7:00 p.m., ESPN+		at Merrimack	L 56–81	16–9 (10–6)	13 – Schofield	11 – Schofield	6 – Menard	Volpe Athletic Center (1,678); North Andover, MA
February 15, 2026; 2:00 p.m., ESPN+		Siena	L 63–67	16–10 (10–7)	17 – Menard	7 – Schofield	6 – Menard	McCann Arena (2,805); Poughkeepsie, NY
February 20, 2026; 7:00 p.m., ESPN+		at Manhattan	W 84–70	17–10 (11–7)	30 – Menard	8 – Daughtry	5 – Blackwell	Draddy Gymnasium (743); Riverdale, NY
February 22, 2026; 2:00 p.m., ESPN+		Sacred Heart	W 65–63	18–10 (12–7)	22 – Menard	11 – Collins-Roberts	5 – Collins-Roberts	McCann Arena (1,354); Poughkeepsie, NY
March 1, 2026; 2:00 p.m., ESPN+		Saint Peter's	L 56–63	18–11 (12–8)	19 – Menard	10 – Collins-Roberts	4 – Salton	McCann Arena (2,358); Poughkeepsie, NY
MAAC tournament
March 7, 2026; 6:00 pm, ESPN+	(5)	vs. (4) Quinnipiac; Quarterfinals	W 77–75	19–11	26 – Menard	11 – Collins-Roberts	6 – Menard	Boardwalk Hall; Atlantic City, NJ
March 8, 2026; 6:00 pm, ESPN+	(5)	vs. (1) Merrimack; Semifinals	L 57–58	19–12	15 – Blackwell	7 – Tied	6 – Menard	Boardwalk Hall (1,395); Atlantic City, NJ
*Non-conference game. ^{#}Rankings from AP poll. (#) Tournament seedings in parentheses. All times are in Eastern.
