= 2025–26 Saint Peter's Peacocks men's basketball team =

American college basketball season

2025–26 Saint Peter's Peacocks men's basketball
- Conference: Metro Atlantic Athletic Conference
- Record: 17–12 (14–6 MAAC)
- Head coach: Bashir Mason (4th season)
- Assistant coaches: Pete Cipriano; Keydren Clark; Vince Johnson; Scott Rodgers
- Home arena: Run Baby Run Arena

2025–26 MAAC men's basketball standings
	Conf.				Overall
Team	W		L	PCT	W		L	PCT
Merrimack	17	–	3	.850	23	–	11	.676
Saint Peter's	14	–	6	.700	17	–	12	.586
Siena †	13	–	7	.650	23	–	11	.676
Quinnipiac	12	–	8	.600	19	–	13	.594
Marist	12	–	8	.600	19	–	12	.613
Mount St. Mary's	11	–	9	.550	15	–	17	.469
Fairfield	11	–	9	.550	21	–	13	.618
Iona	10	–	10	.500	18	–	14	.563
Sacred Heart	9	–	11	.450	14	–	19	.424
Manhattan	8	–	12	.400	12	–	20	.375
Niagara	5	–	15	.250	8	–	22	.267
Canisius	5	–	15	.250	10	–	21	.323
Rider	3	–	17	.150	4	–	25	.138
† 2026 MAAC tournament winner As of March 10, 2026

The 2025–26 Saint Peter's Peacocks men's basketball team represented Saint Peter's University during the 2025–26 NCAA Division I men's basketball season. The Peacocks, led by fourth-year head coach Bashir Mason, played their home games at the Run Baby Run Arena in Jersey City, New Jersey, as members of the Metro Atlantic Athletic Conference.

== Previous season ==
The Peacocks finished the 2024–25 season 12–15, 7–13 in MAAC play to finish in eleventh place. As a result, they did not qualify to participate in the MAAC tournament and did not play in any subsequent postseason competitions.

== Offseason ==
=== Departures ===
Departures
Name	No.	Pos.	Height	Weight	Year	Hometown	Reason for departure
Marcus Randolph	2	G	6'5"	205	Senior	Willingboro, NJ	Graduated
Armoni Zeigler	5	G	6'4"	185	Sophomore	Amityville, NY	Transferred to Ball State
Tyreck Morris	10	G	6'5"	170	Junior	Jamaica, NY	Transferred to Southern New Hampshire
Jakai Sanders	12	G	6'3"	195	Freshman	Brooklyn, NY	Transferred to Le Moyne
Stephon Roberts	15	F	6'10"	230	Senior	Brooklyn, NY	Graduated
Jaquel Morris	21	C/F	6'8"	225	Junior	Brooklyn, NY	Transferred to Norfolk State
Mouhamed Sow	35	F	6'9"	205	RS Junior	Dakar, Senegal	Transferred to Rhode Island

=== Incoming transfers ===
Incoming transfers
Name	No.	Pos.	Height	Weight	Year	Hometown	Previous School
Jahki Gupton	5	G/F	6'7"	195	Junior	Oakland, CA	Howard College
Lucas Scroggins	10	F	6'9"	215	RS Sophomore	Woodbridge, VA	Valparaiso
Shaedon Simpson	12	G/F	6'6"	185	RS Sophomore	Toronto, Canada	Central Michigan
Bol Agu	14	F	6'8"	235	Junior	Winnipeg, Canada	Murray State College
J'Quan Ewing	15	F/C	6'9"	205	RS Senior	Clarksville, TN	Xavier (LA)
Akil Watson	23	F	6'9"	190	Junior	Middletown, NY	UMass

=== Recruiting class ===
College recruiting information
Name	Hometown	School	Height	Weight	Commit date
TJ Robinson; G	Paterson, NJ	Immaculate Conception High School	6 ft 4 in (1.93 m)	185 lb (84 kg)	Apr 29, 2024
TJ Robinson; G	Recruit ratings: Rivals: 247Sports: ESPN: (82)				
Overall recruit ranking:
Note: In many cases, Scout, Rivals, 247Sports, On3, and ESPN may conflict in their listings of height and weight.; In these cases, the average was taken. ESPN grades are on a 100-point scale.; Sources: "2025 Saint Peter's Signees". ESPN.; "2025 Team Ranking". Rivals.

== Roster ==
2025–26 Saint Peter's Peacocks men's basketball team
Players
Coaches

Pos.	#	Name	Height	Weight	Year	Previous school	Hometown
G	0	Eric Morgan Jr.	6 ft 4 in (1.93 m)	190 lb (86 kg)	Sr	District of Columbia	Washington, DC
G	1	Brent Bland	6 ft 3 in (1.91 m)	205 lb (93 kg)	RS Sr	Half Hollow Hills West HS (NY)	Wheatley Heights, NY
G	2	TJ Robinson	6 ft 4 in (1.93 m)	185 lb (84 kg)	Fr	Immaculate Conception HS (NJ)	Paterson, NJ
G	4	Adetokunbo Bakare	6 ft 3 in (1.91 m)	185 lb (84 kg)	GS	Rider	Newark, NJ
G/F	5	Jahki Gupton	6 ft 7 in (2.01 m)	195 lb (88 kg)	Jr	Howard College	Oakland, CA
G	7	Elijah Perkins	6 ft 4 in (1.93 m)	200 lb (91 kg)	Sr	Austin Peay	Middletown, NJ
G	8	Bryce Eaton	6 ft 0 in (1.83 m)	185 lb (84 kg)	RS So	Central Michigan	Detroit, MI
G	10	Lucas Scroggins	6 ft 9 in (2.06 m)	215 lb (98 kg)	RS So	Valparaiso	Woodbridge, VA
F	11	Zaakir Williamson	6 ft 7 in (2.01 m)	230 lb (104 kg)	Sr	Buffalo	Philadelphia, PA
G/F	12	Shaedon Simpson	6 ft 6 in (1.98 m)	185 lb (84 kg)	RS So	Central Michigan	Toronto, Canada
F	14	Bol Agu	6 ft 8 in (2.03 m)	235 lb (107 kg)	Jr	Murray State College	Winnipeg, Canada
F/C	15	J'Quan Ewing	6 ft 9 in (2.06 m)	205 lb (93 kg)	RS Sr	Xavier (LA)	Clarksville, TN
F	23	Akil Watson	6 ft 9 in (2.06 m)	190 lb (86 kg)	RS Jr	UMass	Middletown, NY

Head coach

- Bashir Mason (Drexel)

Assistant coach(es)

- Pete Cipriano (Southern)
- Keydren Clark (Saint Peter's)
- Vince Johnson (St. Thomas Aquinas)
- Scott Rodgers (Drexel)

Legend

- (C) Team captain
- (S) Suspended
- (I) Ineligible
- (W) Walk-on
- Injured
- Current redshirt

Roster
Last update: November 15, 2024

== Schedule and results ==
Date time, TV	Rank^{#}	Opponent^{#}	Result	Record	High points	High rebounds	High assists	Site (attendance) city, state
Regular season
November 3, 2025*; 7:30 pm, ESPN+		at Seton Hall	L 50–77	0–1	11 – Robinson	8 – Ewing	2 – Perkins	Prudential Center (6,312); Newark, NJ
November 8, 2025*; 2:00 pm, ESPN+		Fairleigh Dickinson	W 93–83	1–1	27 – Bland	7 – Bland	8 – Eaton	Run Baby Run Arena (575); Jersey City, NJ
November 12, 2025*; 7:00 pm, ESPN+		at VCU	L 61–78	1–2	25 – Bland	9 – Gupton	4 – Eaton	Stuart C. Siegel Center (7,637); Richmond, VA
November 18, 2025*; 7:00 pm, ESPN+		at Delaware	L 70–81	1–3	21 – Bland	6 – Robinson	8 – Robinson	Bob Carpenter Center (1,600); Newark, DE
November 22, 2025*; 2:00 pm, ESPN+		UMass Lowell	W 68–66	2–3	15 – Robinson	7 – Ewing	6 – Eaton	Run Baby Run Arena (553); Jersey City, NJ
November 29, 2025*; 2:00 pm, ESPN+		Dartmouth	L 61–87	2–4	16 – Bland	8 – Ewing	2 – Morgan Jr.	Run Baby Run Arena (430); Jersey City, NJ
December 5, 2025; 7:00 pm, ESPN+		Canisius	W 69–57	3–4 (1–0)	14 – Tied	9 – Gupton	4 – Eaton	Rum Baby Run Arena (558); Jersey City, NJ
December 7, 2025; 2:00 pm, ESPN+		Niagara	W 71–43	4–4 (2–0)	14 – Tied	9 – Williamson	6 – Eaton	Run Baby Run Arena (482); Jersey City, NJ
December 13, 2025*; 2:30 pm, ESPN+		at Georgetown	L 68–76 ^{OT}	4–5	23 – Eaton	4 – Tied	3 – Eaton	McDonough Arena (1,622); Washington, D.C.
December 22, 2025*; 12:00 pm, ESPN+		Centenary (NJ)	W 116–50	5–5	21 – Bland	11 – Scroggins	8 – Robinson	Run Baby Run Arena (307); Jersey City, NJ
December 29, 2025; 7:00 pm, ESPN+		Fairfield	W 70–66	6–5	17 – Eaton	11 – Williamson	4 – Eaton	Leo D. Mahoney Arena (1,772); Fairfield, CT
January 2, 2026; 7:00 pm, ESPN+		Marist	W 69–59	7–5 (4–0)	13 – Williamson	8 – Gupton	6 – Eaton	Run Baby Run Arena (633); Jersey City, NJ
January 9, 2026; 7:00 pm, ESPN+		at Mount St. Mary's	L 65–70	7–6 (4–1)	18 – Robinson	10 – Gupton	3 – Robinson	Knott Arena (1,690); Emmitsburg, MD
January 11, 2026; 2:00 pm, ESPN+		Merrimack	W 76–63	8–6 (5–1)	17 – Bland	8 – Tied	6 – Eaton	Run Baby Run Arena (450); Jersey City, NJ
January 14, 2026; 7:00 pm, ESPN+		at Quinnipiac	W 74–70	9–6 (6–1)	18 – Eaton	9 – Perkins	4 – Eaton	M&T Bank Arena (814); Hamden, CT
January 17, 2026; 2:00 pm, ESPN+		Rider	W 69–58	10–6 (7–1)	20 – Williamson	11 – Williamson	4 – Bland	Run Baby Run Arena (488); Jersey City, NJ
January 19, 2026; 2:00 pm, ESPN+		Iona	W 77–63	11–6 (8–1)	13 – Williamson	9 – Tied	5 – Robinson	Run Baby Run Arena (564); Jersey City, NJ
January 24, 2026; 2:00 pm, ESPN+		at Merrimack	L 59–67	11–7 (8–2)	14 – Morgan Jr.	14 – Scroggins	3 – Bland	Merrimack Athletics Complex (1,812); North Andover, MA
January 30, 2026; 7:00 pm, ESPN+		Mount St. Mary's	W 66–58	12–7 (9–2)	17 – Bland	6 – Eaton	6 – Eaton	Run Baby Run Arena (1,012); Jersey City, NJ
February 1, 2026; 2:00 pm, ESPN+		at Rider	L 78–81	12–8 (9–3)	20 – Bland	10 – Scroggins	4 – Eaton	Alumni Gymnasium (1,014); Lawrenceville, NJ
February 5, 2026; 7:00 pm, ESPN+		at Manhattan	W 80–75	13–8 (10–3)	21 – Eaton	12 – Scroggins	7 – Eaton	Draddy Gymnasium (683); Riverdale, NY
February 7, 2026; 2:00 pm, ESPN+		Siena	W 70–65	14–8 (11–3)	22 – Eaton	8 – Scroggins	2 – Tied	Run Baby Run Arena (644); Jersey City, NJ
February 13, 2026; 7:00 pm, ESPN+		at Sacred Heart	L 71–78	14–9 (11–4)	15 – Gupton	6 – Bland	4 – Robinson	William H. Pitt Center (869); Fairfield, CT
February 15, 2026; 2:00 pm, ESPN+		Fairfield	W 83–74	15–9 (12–4)	21 – Robinson	10 – Williamson	4 – Tied	Run Baby Run Arena (875); Jersey City, NJ
February 20, 2026; 7:00 pm, ESPN+		at Iona	L 64–72 ^{OT}	15–10 (12–5)	17 – Tied	9 – Gupton	4 – Perkins	Hynes Athletic Center (1,797); New Rochelle, NY
February 22, 2026; 2:00 pm, ESPN+		at Siena	L 63–72	15–11 (12–6)	17 – Eaton	8 – Scroggins	6 – Eaton	MVP Arena (6,113); Albany, NY
February 27, 2026; 7:00 pm, ESPN+		Manhattan	W 75–65	16–11 (13–6)	14 – Tied	10 – Scroggins	7 – Robinson	Run Baby Run Arena (762); Jersey City, NJ
March 1, 2026; 2:00 pm, ESPN+		at Marist	W 63–56	17–11 (14–6)	14 – Bland	8 – Bland	6 – Eaton	McCann Arena (2,358); Poughkeepsie, NY
MAAC tournament
March 6, 2026; 8:30 pm, ESPN+	(2)	vs. (7) Fairfield; Quarterfinals	L 55–74	17–12	11 – Bland	7 – Bland	5 – Eaton	Boardwalk Hall (1,565); Atlantic City, NJ
*Non-conference game. ^{#}Rankings from AP Poll. (#) Tournament seedings in parentheses. All times are in Eastern.
