= 2025–26 Quinnipiac Bobcats men's basketball team =

American college basketball season

2025–26 Quinnipiac Bobcats men's basketball
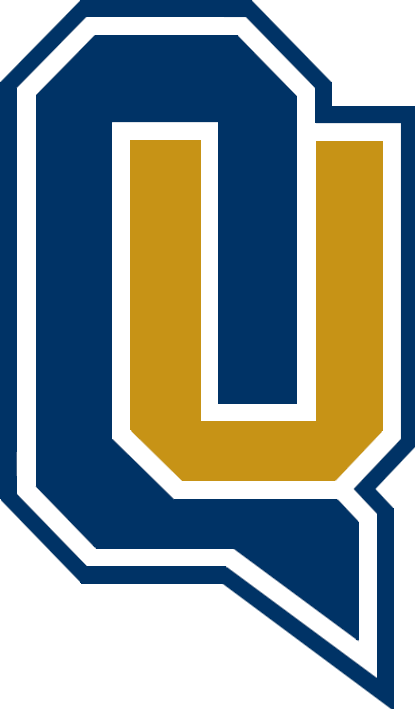
- Conference: Metro Atlantic Athletic Conference
- Record: 19–13 (12–8 MAAC)
- Head coach: Tom Pecora (3rd season)
- Associate head coach: Shaun Morris
- Assistant coaches: Umar Shannon; Jeff Robinson
- Home arena: M&T Bank Arena

2025–26 MAAC men's basketball standings
| | Conf. | | | | Overall |
| Team | W | | L | PCT | W | | L | PCT |
|---|---|---|---|---|---|---|---|---|
| Merrimack | 17 | – | 3 | .850 | 22 | – | 10 | .688 |
| Saint Peter's | 14 | – | 6 | .700 | 17 | – | 12 | .586 |
| Siena | 13 | – | 7 | .650 | 21 | – | 11 | .656 |
| Quinnipiac | 12 | – | 8 | .600 | 19 | – | 13 | .594 |
| Marist | 12 | – | 8 | .600 | 19 | – | 11 | .633 |
| Mount St. Mary's | 11 | – | 9 | .550 | 15 | – | 17 | .469 |
| Fairfield | 11 | – | 9 | .550 | 21 | – | 12 | .636 |
| Iona | 10 | – | 10 | .500 | 18 | – | 14 | .563 |
| Sacred Heart | 9 | – | 11 | .450 | 14 | – | 19 | .424 |
| Manhattan | 8 | – | 12 | .400 | 12 | – | 20 | .375 |
| Niagara | 5 | – | 15 | .250 | 8 | – | 22 | .267 |
| Canisius | 5 | – | 15 | .250 | 10 | – | 21 | .323 |
| Rider | 3 | – | 17 | .150 | 4 | – | 25 | .138 |
† 2026 MAAC tournament winner As of March 7, 2026

The 2025–26 Quinnipiac Bobcats men's basketball team represented Quinnipiac University during the 2025–26 NCAA Division I men's basketball season. The Bobcats, led by third-year head coach Tom Pecora, played their home games at M&T Bank Arena in Hamden, Connecticut as members of the Metro Atlantic Athletic Conference.

== Previous season ==
The Bobcats finished the 2024–25 season 20–13, 15–5 in MAAC play, to finish as MAAC regular season champions. They defeated Rider, before being upset by Iona in the semifinals of the MAAC tournament.

== Preseason ==
On September 30, 2025, the MAAC released their preseason coaches poll. Quinnipiac was picked to finish atop the conference, while receiving eight first-place votes.

=== Preseason rankings ===
MAAC Preseason Poll
| Place | Team | Points |
|---|---|---|
| 1 | Quinnipiac | 158 (8) |
| 2 | Siena | 152 (3) |
| 3 | Sacred Heart | 140 (2) |
| 4 | Manhattan | 133 |
| 5 | Marist | 115 |
| 6 | Iona | 104 |
| 7 | Merrimack | 85 |
| 8 | Fairfield | 74 |
| 9 | Mount St. Mary's | 69 |
| 10 | Rider | 59 |
| 11 | Saint Peter's | 48 |
| 12 | Niagara | 26 |
| 13 | Canisius | 20 |
(#) first-place votes

=== MAAC Preseason Player of the Year ===
Preseason Player of the Year
| Player | Position | Year |
|---|---|---|
| Amarri Monroe | Forward | Senior |
(*) Unanimous selection

=== Preseason All-MAAC Teams ===
Preseason All-MAAC Teams
| Team | Player | Position | Year |
|---|---|---|---|
| First | Amarri Monroe* | Forward | Senior |
| Second | Jaden Zimmerman | Guard | Sophomore |
(*) Unanimous selection

== Roster ==
2025–26 Quinnipiac Bobcats men's basketball team
Players
Coaches

| Pos. | # | Name | Height | Weight | Year | Previous school | Hometown |
|---|---|---|---|---|---|---|---|
| F | 1 | Jayden Reid | 6 ft 10 in (2.08 m) | 210 lb (95 kg) | Fr | Westminster School | Cheshire, Connecticut |
| F | 2 | Amarri Monroe | 6 ft 7 in (2.01 m) | 230 lb (104 kg) | Sr | Wofford | Newburgh, New York |
| G | 3 | Asim Jones | 6 ft 2 in (1.88 m) | 170 lb (77 kg) | Sr | FIU | Paterson, New Jersey |
| G | 4 | Tai Turnage | 6 ft 0 in (1.83 m) | 165 lb (75 kg) | Fr | St. Raymond High School | Bronx, New York |
| F | 5 | Christopher Skenderi | 6 ft 7 in (2.01 m) | 205 lb (93 kg) | Fr | Avon Old Farms | Queens, New York |
| F | 8 | Grant Randall | 6 ft 9 in (2.06 m) | 195 lb (88 kg) | So | Putnam Science Academy | Queens, New York |
| G | 9 | Nate Guerengomba | 6 ft 4 in (1.93 m) | 215 lb (98 kg) | So | UMass | Washington, D.C. |
| G | 10 | Ronell Giles Jr. | 6 ft 4 in (1.93 m) | 200 lb (91 kg) | Sr | Prairie View A&M | Brandywine, Maryland |
| G | 11 | Samson Reilly | 6 ft 2 in (1.88 m) | 165 lb (75 kg) | RS Fr | East Catholic High School | Manchester, Connecticut |
| F | 12 | Spence Wewe | 7 ft 0 in (2.13 m) | 230 lb (104 kg) | So | Toronto Terror Prep | Bristol, England |
| F | 13 | Braylan Ritvo | 6 ft 8 in (2.03 m) | 215 lb (98 kg) | RS Fr | Archbishop Stepinac High School | Harlem, New York |
| G | 21 | Keith Mcknight | 6 ft 7 in (2.01 m) | 205 lb (93 kg) | Fr | Hudson Catholic High School | Teaneck, New Jersey |
| G | 24 | Jaden Zimmerman | 6 ft 5 in (1.96 m) | 205 lb (93 kg) | So | Cushing Academy | Bronx, New York |
| F | 32 | Sam Nosakhare | 6 ft 9 in (2.06 m) | 215 lb (98 kg) | Fr | Putnam Science Academy | Benin City, Nigeria |
| F | 34 | Akintola Akinniyi | 6 ft 7 in (2.01 m) | 230 lb (104 kg) | Jr | Army | Denton, Texas |

Head coach

- Tom Pecora (Adelphi)

Assistant coach(es)

- Shaun Morris (Lycoming)
- Umar Shannon (Quinnipiac)
- Jeff Robinson (WPI)

Legend

- (C) Team captain
- (S) Suspended
- (I) Ineligible
- (W) Walk-on
- Injured
- Current redshirt

Roster
Last update: November 11, 2025

== Schedule and results ==
| Date time, TV | Rank^{#} | Opponent^{#} | Result | Record | Site (attendance) city, state |
Regular season
| November 3, 2025*; 6:30 pm, FS1 | | at No. 5 St. John's | L 74–108 | 0–1 | Carnesecca Arena (5,260); Queens, NY |
| November 6, 2025*; 7:00 pm, ESPN+ | | Central Connecticut | W 71–49 | 1–1 | M&T Bank Arena (2,581); Hamden, CT |
| November 11, 2025*; 7:30 pm, ESPN+ | | Yale | L 60–97 | 1–2 | M&T Bank Arena (2,239); Hamden, CT |
| November 16, 2025*; 2:00 pm, ESPN+ | | at Maine | W 70–64 | 2–2 | Memorial Gymnasium (1,380); Orono, ME |
| November 19, 2025*; 7:00 pm, ESPN+ | | CCNY | W 112–52 | 3–2 | M&T Bank Arena (847); Hamden, CT |
| November 23, 2025*; 5:00 pm, ACCNX | | at Pittsburgh; Legends Classic | W 83–75 | 4–2 | Petersen Events Center (4,721); Pittsburgh, PA |
| November 25, 2025*; 7:00 pm, ESPN+ | | at UCF; Legends Classic | L 91–102 | 4–3 | Addition Financial Arena (5,173); Orlando, FL |
| November 30, 2025*; 2:00 pm, ESPN+ | | Stonehill | W 76–62 | 5–3 | M&T Bank Arena (869); Hamden, CT |
| December 5, 2025; 7:00 pm, ESPN+ | | at Iona | W 89–68 | 6–3 (1–0) | Hynes Athletics Center (2,242); New Rochelle, NY |
| December 7, 2025; 2:00 pm, ESPN+ | | Rider | W 72–58 | 7–3 (2–0) | M&T Bank Arena (1,042); Hamden, CT |
| December 13, 2025*; 2:00 pm, ESPN+ | | UMass Lowell | W 75–71 | 8–3 | M&T Bank Arena (766); Hamden, CT |
| December 17, 2025*; 7:00 pm, FloCollege | | at Monmouth | W 85–75 | 9–3 | OceanFirst Bank Center (1,179); West Long Branch, NJ |
| December 21, 2025*; 1:00 pm, FloCollege | | at Hofstra | L 66–74 | 9–4 | Mack Sports Complex (2,267); Hempstead, NY |
| December 29, 2025; 4:00 pm, ESPN+ | | Marist | W 64–58 | 10–4 (3–0) | M&T Bank Arena (1,277); Hamden, CT |
| January 2, 2026; 7:00 pm, ESPN+ | | at Manhattan | L 79–80 | 10–5 (3–1) | Draddy Gymnasium (1,417); Riverdale, NY |
| January 4, 2026; 2:00 pm, ESPN+ | | Mount St. Mary's | W 80–69 | 11–5 (4–1) | M&T Bank Arena (1,513); Hamden, CT |
| January 11, 2026; 2:00 pm, ESPN+ | | at Sacred Heart | W 70–60 | 12–5 (5–1) | William H. Pitt Center (828); Fairfield, CT |
| January 14, 2026; 7:00 pm, ESPN+ | | Saint Peter's | L 70–74 | 12–6 (5–2) | M&T Bank Arena (814); Hamden, CT |
| January 17, 2026; 3:00 pm, ESPN+ | | at Merrimack | L 71–83 | 12–7 (5–3) | Lawler Arena (1,300); North Andover, MA |
| January 19, 2026; 2:00 pm, ESPN+ | | Manhattan | W 98–92 | 13–7 (6–3) | M&T Bank Arena (1,731); Hamden, CT |
| January 22, 2026; 7:00 pm, ESPN+ | | at Mount St. Mary's | W 77–62 | 14–7 (7–3) | Knott Arena (1,984); Emmitsburg, MD |
| January 24, 2026; 1:00 pm, ESPN+ | | at Marist | L 64–71 | 14–8 (7–4) | McCann Arena (1,520); Poughkeepsie, NY |
| January 30, 2026; 7:00 pm, ESPN+ | | Sacred Heart | L 91–98 | 14–9 (7–5) | M&T Bank Arena (2,635); Hamden, CT |
| February 1, 2026; 2:00 pm, ESPN+ | | at Fairfield | W 72–65 | 15–9 (8–5) | Leo D. Mahoney Arena (3,204); Fairfield, CT |
| February 5, 2026; 7:00 pm, ESPN+ | | Canisius | W 75–60 | 16–9 (9–5) | M&T Bank Arena (669); Hamden, CT |
| February 7, 2026; 2:00 pm, ESPN+ | | Niagara | W 56–55 | 17–9 (10–5) | M&T Bank Arena (1,073); Hamden, CT |
| February 13, 2026; 7:00 pm, ESPN+ | | at Siena | W 74–62 | 18–9 (11–5) | MVP Arena (5,803); Albany, NY |
| February 15, 2026; 2:00 pm, ESPN+ | | Merrimack | L 49–56 | 18–10 (11–6) | M&T Bank Arena (1,829); Hamden, CT |
| February 22, 2026; 2:00 pm, ESPN+ | | Fairfield | L 79–85 | 18–11 (11–7) | M&T Bank Arena (1,474); Hamden, CT |
| February 27, 2026; 6:30 pm, ESPN+ | | at Niagara | L 76–78 ^{OT} | 18–12 (11–8) | Gallagher Center (744); Lewiston, NY |
| March 1, 2026; 1:00 pm, ESPN+ | | at Canisius | W 67–63 | 19–12 (12–8) | Koessler Athletic Center (531); Buffalo, NY |
MAAC tournament
| March 7, 2026; 6:00 p.m., ESPN+ | (4) | vs. (5) Marist; Quarterfinals | L 75–77 | 19–13 | Boardwalk Hall; Atlantic City, NJ |
*Non-conference game. ^{#}Rankings from AP Poll. (#) Tournament seedings in parentheses. All times are in Eastern.
