= 2025–26 Sacred Heart Pioneers men's basketball team =

American college basketball season

2025–26 Sacred Heart Pioneers men's basketball
- Conference: Metro Atlantic Athletic Conference
- Record: 14–19 (9–11 MAAC)
- Head coach: Anthony Latina (13th season)
- Associate head coach: Kyle Steinway
- Assistant coaches: Tom Barrett; Donte Gittens; Jeremy Kipness
- Home arena: William H. Pitt Center

2025–26 MAAC men's basketball standings
	Conf.				Overall
Team	W		L	PCT	W		L	PCT
Merrimack	17	–	3	.850	21	–	10	.677
Saint Peter's	14	–	6	.700	17	–	11	.607
Siena	13	–	7	.650	20	–	11	.645
Quinnipiac	12	–	8	.600	19	–	12	.613
Marist	12	–	8	.600	18	–	11	.621
Mount St. Mary's	11	–	9	.550	15	–	16	.484
Fairfield	11	–	9	.550	20	–	12	.625
Iona	10	–	10	.500	18	–	14	.563
Sacred Heart	9	–	11	.450	14	–	18	.438
Manhattan	8	–	12	.400	12	–	20	.375
Niagara	5	–	15	.250	8	–	22	.267
Canisius	5	–	15	.250	10	–	21	.323
Rider	3	–	17	.150	4	–	25	.138
† 2026 MAAC tournament winner As of March 5, 2026

The 2025–26 Sacred Heart Pioneers men's basketball team represented Sacred Heart University during the 2025–26 NCAA Division I men's basketball season. The Pioneers, led by 13th-year head coach Anthony Latina, played their home games at the William H. Pitt Center in Fairfield, Connecticut as second-year members of the Metro Atlantic Athletic Conference.

== Previous season ==
The Pioneers finished the 2024–25 season 15–18, 10–10 in MAAC play, to finish in seventh place. They defeated Fairfield, before falling to Merrimack in the quarterfinals of the MAAC tournament.

== Preseason ==
On September 30, 2025, the MAAC released their preseason coaches poll. Sacred Heart was picked to finish third in the conference, while receiving two first-place votes.

=== Preseason rankings ===
MAAC Preseason Poll
Place	Team	Points
1	Quinnipiac	158 (8)
2	Siena	152 (3)
3	Sacred Heart	140 (2)
4	Manhattan	133
5	Marist	115
6	Iona	104
7	Merrimack	85
8	Fairfield	74
9	Mount St. Mary's	69
10	Rider	59
11	Saint Peter's	48
12	Niagara	26
13	Canisius	20
(#) first-place votes

=== Preseason All-MAAC Teams ===
Preseason All-MAAC Teams
Team	Player	Position	Year
First	Anquan Hill	Forward	Senior
Second	Mekhi Conner	Guard	Sophomore
Third	Nyle Ralph-Beyer	Guard	Sophomore

== Roster ==
2025–26 Sacred Heart Pioneers men's basketball team
Players
Coaches

Pos.	#	Name	Height	Weight	Year	Previous school	Hometown
G	0	Mooda Gittens	6 ft 4 in (1.93 m)	184 lb (83 kg)	Fr	The Winchendon School	Hartford, Connecticut
G	1	Griffin Barrouk	6 ft 5 in (1.96 m)	200 lb (91 kg)	Sr	Hofstra	Glen Mills, Pennsylvania
G	2	Nyle Ralph-Beyer	6 ft 4 in (1.93 m)	175 lb (79 kg)	So	Henderson High School	West Chester, Pennsylvania
G	3	Mekhi Conner	6 ft 1 in (1.85 m)	183 lb (83 kg)	So	Notre Dame High School	New Haven, Connecticut
G	4	Jaden Slaughter	6 ft 5 in (1.96 m)	205 lb (93 kg)	RS Jr	Buffalo	Buffalo, New York
G	5	Dashon Gittens	6 ft 3 in (1.91 m)	180 lb (82 kg)	Sr	FIU	Hartford, Connecticut
F	6	Yann Farell	6 ft 7 in (2.01 m)	220 lb (100 kg)	Jr	East Carolina	Crowley, Texas
F	7	Anquan Hill	6 ft 9 in (2.06 m)	200 lb (91 kg)	RS Sr	St. Bonaventure	Philadelphia, Pennsylvania
G	8	Jeremiah Jacobs	6 ft 8 in (2.03 m)	245 lb (111 kg)	Fr	Eagle Academy 2	New York, New York
G	10	Taj Smith	6 ft 2 in (1.88 m)	178 lb (81 kg)	So	The Patrick School	Queens, New York
F	11	Abdou Yadd	6 ft 9 in (2.06 m)	250 lb (113 kg)	Fr	Putnam Science Academy	Dakar, Senegal
G	13	Fallou Gueye	6 ft 6 in (1.98 m)	187 lb (85 kg)	So	Putnam Science Academy	Thiès, Senegal
G	21	Kevin Pikiell	6 ft 3 in (1.91 m)	175 lb (79 kg)	Fr	Christian Brothers Academy	Far Hills, New Jersey
F	23	Lucius Gibson-Savadel	6 ft 11 in (2.11 m)	240 lb (109 kg)	RS So	Millbrook School	Bay Shore, New York
F	33	Alex Woodring	6 ft 8 in (2.03 m)	—	So	Ramapo High School	Wyckoff, New Jersey
G	55	Malik Sheppard	5 ft 10 in (1.78 m)	155 lb (70 kg)	So	Don Bosco Prep	Edgewater, New Jersey

Head coach

- Anthony Latina (Brandeis)

Assistant coach(es)

- Kyle Steinway (Providence)
- Tom Barrett (Temple)
- Donte Gittens (Franklin Pierce)
- Jeremy Kipness (Louisville)

Legend

- (C) Team captain
- (S) Suspended
- (I) Ineligible
- (W) Walk-on
- Injured
- Current redshirt

Roster
Last update: November 15, 2025

== Schedule and results ==
Date time, TV	Rank^{#}	Opponent^{#}	Result	Record	Site (attendance) city, state
Regular season
November 4, 2025*; 7:00 pm, ESPN+		Merchant Marine	W 103–46	1–0	William H. Pitt Center (966); Fairfield, CT
November 7, 2025*; 7:00 pm, ESPN+		at Duquesne; Villanova Challenge	L 80–92	1–1	UPMC Cooper Fieldhouse (2,112); Pittsburgh, PA
November 11, 2025*; 7:00 pm, ESPN+		at Villanova; Villanova Challenge	L 60–94	1–2	Finneran Pavilion (6,501); Villanova, PA
November 15, 2025*; 3:00 pm, ESPN+		at Queens; Villanova Challenge	L 64–81	1–3	Curry Arena (678); Charlotte, NC
November 21, 2025*; 7:00 pm, ESPN+		Holy Cross	W 79–66	2–3	William H. Pitt Center (974); Fairfield, CT
November 24, 2025*; 7:00 pm, NECFR		at Central Connecticut	L 106–108 ^{OT}	2–4	William H. Detrick Gymnasium (2,067); New Britain, CT
November 29, 2025*; 6:00 pm, Peacock		at Penn State	L 59–90	2–5	Bryce Jordan Center (4,703); University Park, PA
December 3, 2025; 7:00 pm, ESPN+		at Mount St. Mary's	W 87–80	3–5 (1–0)	Knott Arena (1,782); Emmitsburg, MD
December 7, 2025; 2:00 pm, ESPN+		Iona	L 69–81	3–6 (1–1)	William H. Pitt Center (822); Fairfield, CT
December 13, 2025*; 2:00 pm, ESPN+		at NJIT	W 65–49	4–6	Wellness and Events Center (816); Newark, NJ
December 16, 2025*; 6:00 pm, ESPN+		at UMass Lowell	L 82–87	4–7	Kennedy Family Athletic Complex (315); Lowell, MA
December 19, 2025*; 11:00 am, ESPN+		Dartmouth	W 85–63	5–7	William H. Pitt Center; Fairfield, CT
December 22, 2025*; 2:00 pm, FloCollege		at Towson	L 47–72	5–8	TU Arena (1,115); Towson, MD
December 29, 2025; 2:00 pm, ESPN+		Merrimack	L 72–80	5–9 (1–2)	William H. Pitt Center (642); Fairfield, CT
January 2, 2026; 4:00 pm, ESPN+		at Niagara	L 61–64	5–10 (1–3)	Gallagher Center (708); Lewiston, NY
January 4, 2026; 12:00 pm, ESPN+		at Canisius	L 78–82	5–11 (1–4)	Koessler Athletic Center (567); Buffalo, NY
January 9, 2026; 7:00 pm, ESPN+		Marist	L 72–76	5–12 (1–5)	William H. Pitt Center (849); Fairfield, CT
January 11, 2026; 2:00 pm, ESPN+		Quinnipiac	L 60–70	5–13 (1–6)	William H. Pitt Center (828); Fairfield, CT
January 14, 2026; 7:00 pm, ESPN+		at Siena	W 86–80	6–13 (2–6)	MVP Arena (4,005); Albany, NY
January 19, 2026; 2:00 pm, ESPN+		at Rider	W 105–85	7–13 (3–6)	Alumni Gymnasium (1,086); Lawrenceville, NJ
January 22, 2026; 7:00 pm, ESPN+		Canisius	W 69–66	8–13 (4–6)	William H. Pitt Center (773); Fairfield, CT
January 24, 2026; 12:00 pm, ESPN+		Niagara	W 71–70	9–13 (5–6)	William H. Pitt Center (930); Fairfield, CT
January 30, 2026; 7:00 pm, ESPN+		at Quinnipiac	W 98–91	10–13 (6–6)	M&T Bank Arena (2,635); Hamden, CT
February 1, 2026; 1:00 pm, ESPN+		at Merrimack	L 58–75	10–14 (6–7)	Lawler Arena (1,974); North Andover, MA
February 5, 2026; 7:00 pm, ESPN+		Fairfield	L 87–92	10–15 (6–8)	William H. Pitt Center (2,236); Fairfield, CT
February 7, 2026; 2:00 pm, ESPN+		at Manhattan	L 68–80	10–16 (6–9)	Draddy Gymnasium (696); Riverdale, NY
February 13, 2026; 7:00 pm, ESPN+		Saint Peter's	W 78–71	11–16 (7–9)	William H. Pitt Center (869); Fairfield, CT
February 15, 2026; 2:00 pm, ESPN+		Rider	W 86–75	12–16 (8–9)	William H. Pitt Center (1,343); Fairfield, CT
February 20, 2026; 7:00 pm, ESPN+		at Fairfield	L 68–78	12–17 (8–10)	Leo D. Mahoney Arena (3,565); Fairfield, CT
February 22, 2026; 2:00 pm, ESPN+		at Marist	L 63–65	12–18 (8–11)	McCann Arena (1,354); Poughkeepsie, NY
February 27, 2026; 7:00 pm, ESPN+		Mount St. Mary's	W 77–69	13–18 (9–11)	William H. Pitt Center (1,016); Fairfield, CT
MAAC tournament
March 5, 2026; 6:00 pm, ESPN+	(9)	vs. (8) Iona; First round	W 91–80	14–18	Boardwalk Hall (1,037); Atlantic City, NJ
March 6, 2026; 6:00 pm, ESPN+	(9)	vs. (1) Merrimack; Quarterfinals	L 48–70	14–19	Boardwalk Hall; Atlantic City, NJ
*Non-conference game. ^{#}Rankings from AP Poll. (#) Tournament seedings in parentheses. All times are in Eastern.
