= 2025–26 Rider Broncs men's basketball team =

American college basketball season

2025–26 Rider Broncs men's basketball
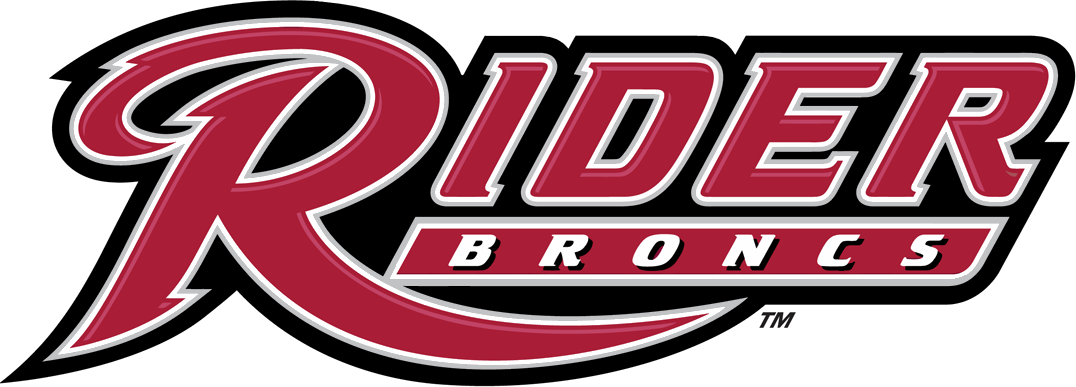
- Conference: Metro Atlantic Athletic Conference
- Record: 4–25 (3–17 MAAC)
- Head coach: Kevin Baggett (14th season)
- Associate head coach: Dino Presley
- Assistant coaches: Geoff Arnold; Kim Waiters
- Home arena: Alumni Gymnasium

2025–26 MAAC men's basketball standings
	Conf.				Overall
Team	W		L	PCT	W		L	PCT
Merrimack	17	–	3	.850	23	–	10	.697
Saint Peter's	14	–	6	.700	17	–	12	.586
Siena	13	–	7	.650	22	–	11	.667
Quinnipiac	12	–	8	.600	19	–	13	.594
Marist	12	–	8	.600	19	–	12	.613
Mount St. Mary's	11	–	9	.550	15	–	17	.469
Fairfield	11	–	9	.550	21	–	13	.618
Iona	10	–	10	.500	18	–	14	.563
Sacred Heart	9	–	11	.450	14	–	19	.424
Manhattan	8	–	12	.400	12	–	20	.375
Niagara	5	–	15	.250	8	–	22	.267
Canisius	5	–	15	.250	10	–	21	.323
Rider	3	–	17	.150	4	–	25	.138
† 2026 MAAC tournament winner As of March 8, 2026

The 2025–26 Rider Broncs men's basketball team represented Rider University during the 2025–26 NCAA Division I men's basketball season. The Broncs, led by 14th-year head coach Kevin Baggett, played their home games at the Alumni Gymnasium in Lawrenceville, New Jersey as members of the Metro Atlantic Athletic Conference. The Broncs finished the season 4–25, 3–17 in MAAC play to finish in last place. They failed to qualify for the MAAC tournament.

== Previous season ==
The Broncs finished the 2024–25 season 14–19, 9–11 in MAAC play, to finish in a tie for eighth place. They defeated Siena, before falling to top-seeded Quinnipiac in the quarterfinals of the 2025 MAAC tournament.

== Preseason ==
On September 30, 2025, the MAAC released their preseason coaches poll. Rider was picked to finish tenth in the conference.

=== Preseason rankings ===
MAAC Preseason Poll
Place	Team	Points
1	Quinnipiac	158 (8)
2	Siena	152 (3)
3	Sacred Heart	140 (2)
4	Manhattan	133
5	Marist	115
6	Iona	104
7	Merrimack	85
8	Fairfield	74
9	Mount St. Mary's	69
10	Rider	59
11	Saint Peter's	48
12	Niagara	26
13	Canisius	20
(#) first-place votes

=== Preseason All-MAAC Teams ===
Preseason All-MAAC Teams
Team	Player	Position	Year
Third	Zion Cruz	Guard	Senior

== Roster ==
2025–26 Rider Broncs men's basketball team
Players
Coaches

Pos.	#	Name	Height	Weight	Year	Previous school	Hometown
G/F	0	Zion Cruz	6 ft 5 in (1.96 m)	195 lb (88 kg)	Sr	Pratt Community College	Trenton, New Jersey
G	2	Caleb Smith	6 ft 5 in (1.96 m)	205 lb (93 kg)	Jr	Garden City Community College	Atlanta, Georgia
F	3	Shemani Fuller	6 ft 9 in (2.06 m)	210 lb (95 kg)	RS Sr	Clark Atlanta	Bronx, New York
G	5	Jamir McNeil	6 ft 0 in (1.83 m)	160 lb (73 kg)	Fr	Middle Township High School	Cape May Court House, New Jersey
F	6	Mohamad Diallo	7 ft 0 in (2.13 m)	230 lb (104 kg)	Sr	Florida Memorial	Decatur, Georgia
F	7	Davis Bynum	6 ft 9 in (2.06 m)	225 lb (102 kg)	So	Cal State Fullerton	O'Fallon, Illinois
G	8	Devean Williams	6 ft 3 in (1.91 m)	180 lb (82 kg)	Sr	Bryant	Los Angeles, California
G/F	10	AB Coulibaly	6 ft 5 in (1.96 m)	185 lb (84 kg)	Fr	Avon Old Farms	Philadelphia, Pennsylvania
G	11	Flash Burton	6 ft 3 in (1.91 m)	165 lb (75 kg)	So	Cardinal O'Hara High School	Philadelphia, Pennsylvania
F	13	Daniel Helterhoff	6 ft 10 in (2.08 m)	240 lb (109 kg)	Sr	USC Upstate	Cologne, Germany
G	14	Antwan Wilson	6 ft 5 in (1.96 m)	190 lb (86 kg)	Jr	Weatherford College	Salisbury, Maryland
F	21	Cole McCabe	6 ft 8 in (2.03 m)	220 lb (100 kg)	So	IMG Academy	Miami Beach, Florida
G	22	Maurizio D'Alessandro	6 ft 1 in (1.85 m)	185 lb (84 kg)	So	Fork Union Military Academy	Charlottesville, Virginia
G	30	Kristupas Kepežinskas	6 ft 0 in (1.83 m)	—	Fr	BC Žalgiris-3	Kaunas, Lithuania

Head coach

- Kevin Baggett (Saint Joseph's)

Assistant coach(es)

- Dino Presley (Kutztown)
- Geoff Arnold (Saint Joseph's)
- Kim Waiters (Robert Morris)

Legend

- (C) Team captain
- (S) Suspended
- (I) Ineligible
- (W) Walk-on
- Injured
- Current redshirt

Roster
Last update: November 15, 2025

== Schedule and results ==
Date time, TV	Rank^{#}	Opponent^{#}	Result	Record	High points	High rebounds	High assists	Site (attendance) city, state
Exhibition
October 25, 2025*; 3:00 pm		Rowan	W 76–64	–	20 – Burton	11 – Fuller	3 – Burton	Alumni Gymnasium (1,357); Lawrenceville, NJ
Regular season
November 3, 2025*; 7:00 pm, ACCNX		at Virginia	L 53–87	0–1	17 – Burton	8 – Smith	1 – Tied	John Paul Jones Arena (12,121); Charlottesville, VA
November 5, 2025*; 6:00 pm, BTN		at Rutgers	L 53–81	0–2	12 – Smith	10 – Smith	2 – Burton	Jersey Mike's Arena (8,000); Piscataway, NJ
November 15, 2025*; 7:00 pm, ESPN+		Eastern	W 86–54	1–2	21 – Burton	8 – Smith	4 – McCabe	Alumni Gymnasium (1,386); Lawrenceville, NJ
November 18, 2025*; 9:00 pm, SECN		at Texas	L 65–99	1–3	16 – Burton	7 – Fuller	3 – McNeil	Moody Center (10,641); Austin, TX
November 20, 2025*; 9:00 pm, TNT		at No. 2 Houston	L 45–91	1–4	13 – Smith	5 – Smith	3 – Cruz	Fertitta Center (7,035); Houston, TX
November 25, 2025*; 7:00 pm, ESPN+		Coppin State	L 65–68	1–5	18 – Cruz	11 – Smith	3 – Smith	Alumni Gymnasium (822); Lawrenceville, NJ
December 4, 2025; 7:00 pm, ESPN+		at Merrimack	L 66–68	1–6 (0–1)	12 – McCabe	12 – Fuller	3 – Burton	Volpe Athletic Center (1,876); North Andover, MA
December 7, 2025; 2:00 pm, ESPN+		at Quinnipiac	L 58–72	1–7 (0–2)	20 – Coulibaly	9 – Coulibaly	2 – Tied	M&T Bank Arena (1,042); Hamden, CT
December 9, 2025*; 7:00 pm, ESPN+		Bucknell	L 38–51	1–8	7 – Wilson	8 – Tied	1 – Tied	Alumni Gymnasium (1,216); Lawrenceville, NJ
December 16, 2025*; 7:00 pm, ESPN+		at Delaware	L 57–65	1–9	16 – Burton	7 – Diallo	3 – Cruz	Bob Carpenter Center (1,189); Newark, DE
December 22, 2025*; 7:00 pm, ESPN+		at VCU	L 79–100	1–10	15 – Fuller	6 – Fuller	6 – Cruz	Siegel Center (7,637); Richmond, VA
December 29, 2025; 7:00 pm, ESPN+		Manhattan	L 71–74	1–11 (0–3)	19 – Bynum	14 – Fuller	6 – Smith	Alumni Gymnasium (1,234); Lawrenceville, NJ
January 4, 2026; 2:00 pm, ESPN+		Siena	L 65–74	1–12 (0–4)	20 – Cruz	11 – Fuller	4 – Burton	Alumni Gymnasium (1,014); Lawrenceville, NJ
January 9, 2026; 7:00 pm, ESPN+		at Fairfield	L 62–68	1–13 (0–5)	27 – Burton	8 – Smith	2 – Tied	Leo D. Mahoney Arena (1,706); Fairfield, CT
January 11, 2026; 2:00 pm, ESPN+		Marist	L 49–71	1–14 (0–6)	13 – Cruz	6 – Smith	2 – Wilson	Alumni Gymnasium (1,008); Lawrenceville, NJ
January 14, 2026; 7:00 pm, ESPN+		Iona	W 72–68	2–14 (1–6)	21 – Burton	13 – Smith	4 – Fuller	Alumni Gymnasium (872); Lawrenceville, NJ
January 17, 2026; 2:00 pm, ESPN+		at Saint Peter's	L 58–69	2–15 (1–7)	17 – Burton	10 – Bynum	6 – Burton	Yanitelli Center (488); Jersey City, NJ
January 19, 2026; 2:00 pm, ESPN+		Sacred Heart	L 85–105	2–16 (1–8)	21 – Burton	15 – Smith	8 – Burton	Alumni Gymnasium (1,086); Lawrenceville, NJ
January 24, 2026; 4:00 pm, ESPN+		at Mount St. Mary's	L 61–71	2–17 (1–9)	22 – Cruz	11 – Fuller	4 – Burton	Knott Arena (2,567); Emmitsburg, MD
January 30, 2026; 7:00 pm, ESPNU/ESPN+		at Manhattan	L 90–95	2–18 (1–10)	22 – Cruz	7 – Smith	11 – Burton	Draddy Gymnasium (722); Riverdale, NY
February 1, 2026; 2:00 pm, ESPN+		Saint Peter's	W 81–78	3–18 (2–10)	25 – Burton	6 – Burton	2 – Burton	Alumni Gymnasium (1,014); Lawrenceville, NJ
February 5, 2026; 7:00 pm, ESPNU/ESPN+		at Marist	L 52–81	3–19 (2–11)	18 – Burton	6 – Smith	2 – Tied	McCann Arena (1,326); Poughkeepsie, NY
February 7, 2026; 7:00 pm, ESPN+		Merrimack	L 47–73	3–20 (2–12)	18 – Burton	7 – Smith	3 – Cruz	Alumni Gymnasium (1,521); Lawrenceville, NJ
February 13, 2026; 7:00 pm, ESPN+		Mount St. Mary's	L 55–65	3–21 (2–13)	22 – Cruz	6 – Smith	3 – McNeil	Alumni Gymnasium (1,014); Lawrenceville, NJ
February 15, 2026; 2:00 pm, ESPN+		at Sacred Heart	L 75–86	3–22 (2–14)	22 – Cruz	11 – Smith	4 – Tied	William H. Pitt Center (1,343); Fairfield, CT
February 20, 2026; 7:00 pm, ESPNU/ESPN+		Canisius	L 66–72	3–23 (2–15)	22 – Burton	8 – Fuller	3 – Tied	Alumni Gymnasium (1,008); Lawrenceville, NJ
February 22, 2026; 2:00 pm, ESPN+		Niagara	W 67–62	4–23 (3–15)	20 – Burton	7 – Tied	6 – Burton	Alumni Gymnasium (989); Lawrenceville, NJ
February 27, 2026; 7:00 pm, ESPN+		at Iona	L 58–80	4–24 (3–16)	25 – Cruz	9 – Smith	1 – Tied	Hynes Athletics Center (2,159); New Rochelle, NY
March 1, 2026; 2:00 pm, ESPNU/ESPN+		at Siena	L 61–76	4–25 (3–17)	20 – Burton	6 – Tied	3 – Burton	MVP Arena (6,016); Albany, NY
*Non-conference game. ^{#}Rankings from AP Poll. (#) Tournament seedings in parentheses. All times are in Eastern.
