= 2025–26 Niagara Purple Eagles men's basketball team =

American college basketball season

2025–26 Niagara Purple Eagles men's basketball
- Conference: Metro Atlantic Athletic Conference
- Record: 8–22 (5–15 MAAC)
- Head coach: Greg Paulus (7th season)
- Assistant coaches: Chris Buchanan; Will Holland; Jake Presutti; Charles Chigeru
- Home arena: Gallagher Center

2025–26 MAAC men's basketball standings
	Conf.				Overall
Team	W		L	PCT	W		L	PCT
Merrimack	17	–	3	.850	21	–	10	.677
Saint Peter's	14	–	6	.700	17	–	11	.607
Siena	13	–	7	.650	20	–	11	.645
Quinnipiac	12	–	8	.600	19	–	12	.613
Marist	12	–	8	.600	18	–	11	.621
Mount St. Mary's	11	–	9	.550	15	–	16	.484
Fairfield	11	–	9	.550	19	–	12	.613
Iona	10	–	10	.500	18	–	13	.581
Sacred Heart	9	–	11	.450	13	–	18	.419
Manhattan	8	–	12	.400	12	–	19	.387
Niagara	5	–	15	.250	8	–	22	.267
Canisius	5	–	15	.250	10	–	21	.323
Rider	3	–	17	.150	4	–	25	.138
† 2026 MAAC tournament winner As of March 1, 2026

The 2025–26 Niagara Purple Eagles men's basketball team represented Niagara University during the 2025–26 NCAA Division I men's basketball season. The Purple Eagles, led by seventh-year head coach Greg Paulus, played their home games at the Gallagher Center in Lewiston, New York as members of the Metro Atlantic Athletic Conference.

== Previous season ==
The Purple Eagles finished the 2024–25 season 11–20, 6–14 in MAAC play, to finish in 12th place. They failed to qualify for the MAAC tournament, as only the top ten teams qualify.

== Preseason ==
On September 30, 2025, the MAAC released their preseason coaches poll. Niagara was picked to finish 12th in the conference.

=== Preseason rankings ===
MAAC Preseason Poll
Place	Team	Points
1	Quinnipiac	158 (8)
2	Siena	152 (3)
3	Sacred Heart	140 (2)
4	Manhattan	133
5	Marist	115
6	Iona	104
7	Merrimack	85
8	Fairfield	74
9	Mount St. Mary's	69
10	Rider	59
11	Saint Peter's	48
12	Niagara	26
13	Canisius	20
(#) first-place votes

=== Preseason All-MAAC Teams ===
No players were named to the First, Second or Third Preseason All-MAAC Teams.

== Roster ==
2025–26 Niagara Purple Eagles men's basketball team
Players
Coaches

Pos.	#	Name	Height	Weight	Year	Previous school	Hometown
F	0	Justin Hawkins	6 ft 7 in (2.01 m)	—	Sr	Jefferson	Willingboro, New Jersey
G	1	Reggie Prudhomme	6 ft 0 in (1.83 m)	—	GS	Cameron	Missouri City, Texas
G	2	Trenton Walters	5 ft 9 in (1.75 m)	150 lb (68 kg)	Jr	Indian Hills Community College	Frisco, Texas
G	5	Justin Page	6 ft 5 in (1.96 m)	185 lb (84 kg)	Jr	Cal Poly	Peoria, Illinois
C	8	Kabeya Tshibangu	6 ft 9 in (2.06 m)	—	RS Sr	Northwestern Oklahoma State	Justin, Texas
G	9	Gael Dalmau	6 ft 6 in (1.98 m)	—	Fr	Prestige Worldwide Sports Academy	Guaynabo, Puerto Rico
G	10	Landon Williams	6 ft 4 in (1.93 m)	—	So	North Farmington High School	Farmington Hills, Michigan
F	11	Vice Zanki	6 ft 8 in (2.03 m)	215 lb (98 kg)	Jr	Eastern Washington	Zagreb, Croatia
G	12	Josiah Sabino	6 ft 4 in (1.93 m)	195 lb (88 kg)	Jr	Garden City Community College	Jacksonville, Florida
G	15	Brian Griffith	5 ft 10 in (1.78 m)	—	Jr	Coffeyville	Owensboro, Kentucky
F	22	Drew Larson	6 ft 7 in (2.01 m)	—	Jr	Northwest College	Fort Collins, Colorado
F	32	Will Shortt	6 ft 8 in (2.03 m)	215 lb (98 kg)	So	IMG Academy	Sydney, Australia
G	35	AJ McBride	6 ft 5 in (1.96 m)	—	So	Moeller High School	Cincinnati, Ohio

Head coach

- Greg Paulus (Duke)

Assistant coach(es)

- Chris Buchanan (Peninsula)
- Will Holland (Mount St. Mary's)
- Jake Presutti (Syracuse)
- Charles Chigeru (Barry)

Legend

- (C) Team captain
- (S) Suspended
- (I) Ineligible
- (W) Walk-on
- Injured
- Current redshirt

Roster
Last update: November 11, 2025

== Schedule and results ==
Date time, TV	Rank^{#}	Opponent^{#}	Result	Record	Site (attendance) city, state
Regular season
November 3, 2025*; 7:00 pm, ESPN+		at Duquesne	L 63–83	0–1	UPMC Cooper Fieldhouse (2,133); Pittsburgh, PA
November 8, 2025*; 2:00 pm, ESPN+		at Binghamton	W 67–59	1–1	Dr. Bai Lee Court (1,519); Vestal, NY
November 10, 2025*; 6:30 pm, ESPN+		Delaware State	W 68–57	2–1	Gallagher Center (1,676); Lewiston, NY
November 17, 2025*; 7:00 pm, NECFR		at Le Moyne	L 68–74	2–2	Ted Grant Court (1,048); DeWitt, NY
November 21, 2025*; 7:00 pm, ACCN		at No. 5 Duke; Brotherhood Run	L 42–100	2–3	Cameron Indoor Stadium (9,314); Durham, NC
November 22, 2025*; 4:00 pm, ACCNX		vs. Howard; Brotherhood Run	L 70–80	2–4	Cameron Indoor Stadium; Durham, NC
November 29, 2025*; 1:00 pm, ESPN+		Detroit Mercy	L 66–70	2–5	Gallagher Center (747); Lewiston, NY
December 5, 2025; 7:00 pm, ESPN+		at Siena	L 54–83	2–6 (0–1)	MVP Arena (4,259); Albany, NY
December 7, 2025; 2:00 pm, ESPN+		at Saint Peter's	L 43–71	2–7 (0–2)	Run Baby Run Arena (482); Jersey City, NJ
December 13, 2025*; 4:00 pm		at Morgan State	L 73–81	2–8	Hill Field House (368); Baltimore, MD
December 15, 2025*; 7:00 pm, ESPN+		at VCU	L 58–84	2–9	Siegel Center (7,637); Richmond, VA
December 20, 2025*; 1:00 pm, ESPN+		Houghton	W 81−58	3−9	Gallagher Center (659); Lewiston, NY
January 2, 2026; 4:00 pm, ESPN+		Sacred Heart	W 64–61	4–9 (1–2)	Gallagher Center (708); Lewiston, NY
January 4, 2026; 2:00 pm, ESPN+		Fairfield	L 75–83	4–10 (1–3)	Gallagher Center (746); Lewiston, NY
January 9, 2026; 7:00 pm, ESPN+		at Iona	L 53–71	4–11 (1–4)	Hynes Athletics Center (1,741); New Rochelle, NY
January 11, 2026; 2:00 pm, ESPN+		at Manhattan	L 70–79	4–12 (1–5)	Draddy Gymnasium (721); Riverdale, NY
January 14, 2026; 7:00 pm, ESPN+		at Canisius; Battle of the Bridge	W 59–54	5–12 (2–5)	Koessler Athletic Center (1,315); Buffalo, NY
January 19, 2026; 2:00 pm, ESPN+		Mount St. Mary's	L 58–68	5–13 (2–6)	Gallagher Center (552); Lewiston, NY
January 22, 2026; 7:00 pm, ESPN+		at Fairfield	L 61–62	5–14 (2–7)	Leo D. Mahoney Arena (1,541); Fairfield, CT
January 24, 2026; 12:00 pm, ESPN+		at Sacred Heart	L 70–71	5–15 (2–8)	William H. Pitt Center (930); Fairfield, CT
January 30, 2026; 6:30 pm, ESPN+		Siena	L 79–82	5–16 (2–9)	Gallagher Center (1,048); Lewiston, NY
February 1, 2026; 2:00 pm, ESPN+		Marist	L 46–58	5–17 (2–10)	Gallagher Center (745); Lewiston, NY
February 3, 2026; 6:30 pm, ESPN+		Canisius; Battle of the Bridge	W 65–56	6–17 (3–10)	Gallagher Center (1,246); Lewiston, NY
February 7, 2026; 2:00 pm, ESPN+		at Quinnipiac	L 55–56	6–18 (3–11)	M&T Bank Arena (1,073); Hamden, CT
February 13, 2026; 6:30 pm, ESPN+		Manhattan	L 69–77	6–19 (3–12)	Gallagher Center (706); Lewiston, NY
February 15, 2026; 2:00 pm, ESPN+		Iona	W 70–68	7–19 (4–12)	Gallagher Center (836); Lewiston, NY
February 20, 2026; 7:00 pm, ESPN+		at Mount St. Mary's	L 63–76	7–20 (4–13)	Knott Arena (2,520); Emmitsburg, MD
February 22, 2026; 2:00 pm, ESPN+		at Rider	L 62–67	7–21 (4–14)	Alumni Gymnasium (989); Lawrenceville, NJ
February 27, 2026; 6:30 pm, ESPN+		Quinnipiac	W 78–76 ^{OT}	8–21 (5–14)	Gallagher Center (744); Lewiston, NY
March 1, 2026; 2:00 pm, ESPN+		Merrimack	L 66–73	8–22 (5–15)	Gallagher Center (890); Lewiston, NY
*Non-conference game. ^{#}Rankings from AP Poll. (#) Tournament seedings in parentheses. All times are in Eastern.
