= Gavin Doty =

American basketball player (born 2006)

No. 4 – Syracuse Orange
- Position: Small forward
- Conference: Atlantic Coast Conference

Personal information
- Born: June 2, 2006 (age 20)
- Listed height: 6 ft 5 in (1.96 m)
- Listed weight: 185 lb (84 kg)

Career information
- High school: The Phelps School (Malvern, Pennsylvania); G. Ray Bodley (Fulton, New York)
- College: Siena (2024–2026); Syracuse (2026–present)

Career highlights
- First-team All-MAAC (2026); MAAC All-Freshman Team (2025); MAAC tournament MVP (2026)

Gavin Doty (born June 2, 2006) is an American college basketball player for the Syracuse Orange of the Atlantic Coast Conference. He previously played for the Siena Saints.

== High school career ==
Doty played high school basketball at The Phelps School in Malvern, Pennsylvania and at G. Ray Bodley High School in Fulton, New York.

== College career ==
Doty began his college basketball career at Siena, playing his freshman and sophomore seasons with the team. As a freshman, Doty averaged 11.3 points, 6.1 rebounds, and 1.4 assists per game and was named to the 2024-25 MAAC All-Freshman team. In his sophomore season at Siena, Doty started in all 35 games and averaged 18.0 points, 6.9 rebounds, and 2.2 assists per game. Siena was 2026 MAAC tournament champions and qualified for the NCAA tournament, losing to Duke 71–65. Doty was named to the 2025–26 All-MAAC first team, All-MAAC tournament team, and the MAAC tournament's MVP.

In April 2026, Doty committed to Syracuse as a transfer.
