= 2025–26 Mount St. Mary's Mountaineers men's basketball team =

American college basketball season

2025–26 Mount St. Mary's Mountaineers men's basketball
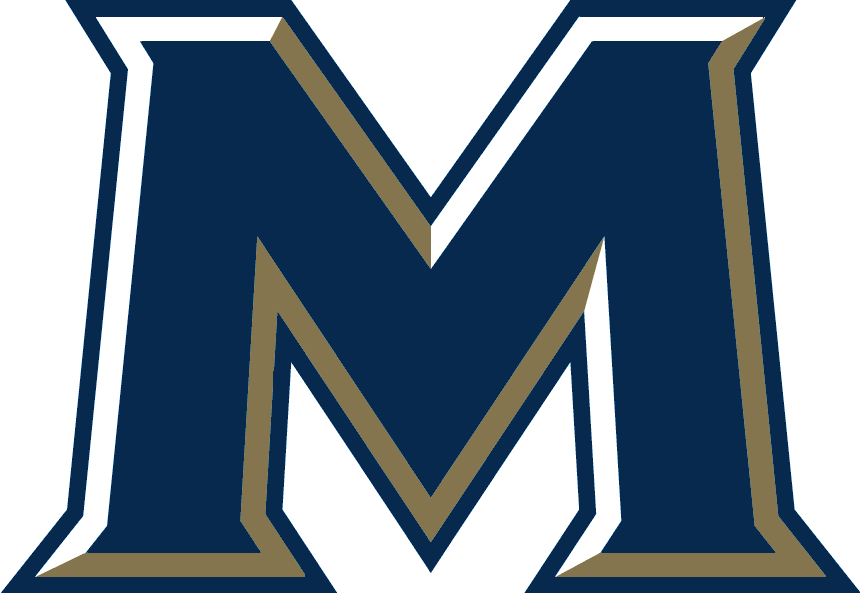
- Conference: Metro Atlantic Athletic Conference
- Record: 15–17 (11–9 MAAC)
- Head coach: Donny Lind (2nd season)
- Assistant coaches: Keith Chesley; Jeremy Freeman; Dave Matturro; Sidy Sall; Andrew Winton
- Home arena: Knott Arena

2025–26 MAAC men's basketball standings
	Conf.				Overall
Team	W		L	PCT	W		L	PCT
Merrimack	17	–	3	.850	23	–	11	.676
Saint Peter's	14	–	6	.700	17	–	12	.586
Siena †	13	–	7	.650	23	–	12	.657
Quinnipiac	12	–	8	.600	19	–	13	.594
Marist	12	–	8	.600	19	–	12	.613
Mount St. Mary's	11	–	9	.550	15	–	17	.469
Fairfield	11	–	9	.550	21	–	13	.618
Iona	10	–	10	.500	18	–	14	.563
Sacred Heart	9	–	11	.450	14	–	19	.424
Manhattan	8	–	12	.400	12	–	20	.375
Niagara	5	–	15	.250	8	–	22	.267
Canisius	5	–	15	.250	10	–	21	.323
Rider	3	–	17	.150	4	–	25	.138
† 2026 MAAC tournament winner

The 2025–26 Mount St. Mary's Mountaineers men's basketball team represented Mount St. Mary's University during the 2025–26 NCAA Division I men's basketball season. The Mountaineers, led by second-year head coach Donny Lind, played their home games at Knott Arena in Emmitsburg, Maryland as members of the Metro Atlantic Athletic Conference.

== Previous season ==
The Mountaineers finished the 2024–25 season 23–13, 12–8 in MAAC play, to finish in a tie for fourth place. They defeated Marist, Merrimack and Iona to win the MAAC tournament championship game for the first time since joining the conference in the 2022–23 season, and their first NCAA tournament appearance since 2021. In the NCAA tournament, the Mountaineers would receive the #16 seed in the East Region, where they would defeat fellow #16 seed American in the First Four, before falling to #1 region seed Duke in the First Round.

== Preseason ==
On September 30, 2025, the MAAC released their preseason coaches poll. Mount St. Mary's was picked to finish ninth in the conference.

=== Preseason rankings ===
MAAC Preseason Poll
Place	Team	Points
1	Quinnipiac	158 (8)
2	Siena	152 (3)
3	Sacred Heart	140 (2)
4	Manhattan	133
5	Marist	115
6	Iona	104
7	Merrimack	85
8	Fairfield	74
9	Mount St. Mary's	69
10	Rider	59
11	Saint Peter's	48
12	Niagara	26
13	Canisius	20
(#) first-place votes

=== Preseason All-MAAC Teams ===
Preseason All-MAAC Teams
Team	Player	Position	Year
Third	Xavier Lipscomb	Guard	Graduate Student

== Roster ==
2025–26 Mount St. Mary's Mountaineers men's basketball team
Players
Coaches

Pos.	#	Name	Height	Weight	Year	Previous school	Hometown
G	1	Anastasios Rozakeas	6 ft 7 in (2.01 m)	225 lb (102 kg)	So	Florida State	Athens, Greece
G	2	Arlandus Keyes	6 ft 2 in (1.88 m)	173 lb (78 kg)	Sr	Ellsworth Community College	Florissant, Missouri
G	3	John Miller IV	6 ft 1 in (1.85 m)	195 lb (88 kg)	GS	Marriotts Ridge High School	Eldersburg, Maryland
G	4	Mason So	6 ft 2 in (1.88 m)	180 lb (82 kg)	Jr	UNC Greensboro	Burke, Virginia
F	5	Trey Deveaux	6 ft 5 in (1.96 m)	205 lb (93 kg)	GS	Western Illinois	Lincoln, Nebraska
G	6	Jaxon Hartman	6 ft 3 in (1.91 m)	195 lb (88 kg)	RS So	West Virginia Wesleyan	Staunton, Virginia
F	7	Elijah Espinosa	6 ft 9 in (2.06 m)	200 lb (91 kg)	RS Fr	Red Land High School	Etters, Pennsylvania
G	8	Justin May	6 ft 2 in (1.88 m)	185 lb (84 kg)	Fr	Link Academy	Little Rock, Arkansas
G	9	Abdou Khadre Kébé	6 ft 7 in (2.01 m)	190 lb (86 kg)	So	NBA Academy Latin America	Dakar, Senegal
G	10	Patrick Haigh	6 ft 4 in (1.93 m)	190 lb (86 kg)	Jr	Bishop Guilfoyle High School	Altoona, Pennsylvania
F	11	Justin Amadi	6 ft 7 in (2.01 m)	225 lb (102 kg)	RS Sr	Tulsa	Greenville, South Carolina
F	21	Luke McEldon	6 ft 10 in (2.08 m)	255 lb (116 kg)	RS Jr	Santa Clara	London, England
G	22	Noah Rogers	6 ft 1 in (1.85 m)	175 lb (79 kg)	So	St. Mary's Ryken High School	Waldorf, Maryland
F	23	Yakhya Diop	7 ft 0 in (2.13 m)	220 lb (100 kg)	Fr	NBA Academy Africa	Dakar, Senegal
G	30	Anthony Arrington	6 ft 2 in (1.88 m)	190 lb (86 kg)	RS Jr	Wofford	Atlanta, Georgia
G	45	Xavier Lipscomb	6 ft 2 in (1.88 m)	195 lb (88 kg)	GS	Radford	Washington, D.C.

Head coach

- Donny Lind (Loyola (MD))

Assistant coach(es)

- Keith Chesley (Maine–Augusta)
- Jeremy Freeman (Cornell)
- Dave Matturro (St. John Fisher)
- Sidy Sall (Christian Brothers)
- Andrew Winton (Gettysburg)

Legend

- (C) Team captain
- (S) Suspended
- (I) Ineligible
- (W) Walk-on
- Injured
- Current redshirt

Roster
Last update: November 15, 2025

== Schedule and results ==
Date time, TV	Rank^{#}	Opponent^{#}	Result	Record	Site (attendance) city, state
Exhibition
October 29, 2025*; 7:00 pm		at Hood	W 85–70	–	Woodsboro Bank Arena (384); Frederick, MD
Regular season
November 4, 2025*; 7:00 pm, ESPN+		at West Virginia	L 54–70	0–1	Hope Coliseum (10,081); Morgantown, WV
November 7, 2025*; 7:00 pm, ESPN+		Bucknell	L 62–73	0–2	Knott Arena (2,821); Emmitsburg, MD
November 11, 2025*; 7:00 pm, NECFR		at Saint Francis	W 74–66	1–2	DeGol Arena (827); Loretto, PA
November 16, 2025*; 6:00 pm, ESPN+		at Cincinnati	L 55–72	1–3	Fifth Third Arena (9,007); Cincinnati, OH
November 19, 2025*; 7:00 pm, B1G+		at Maryland	L 90–95 ^{OT}	1–4	Xfinity Center (10,318); College Park, MD
November 23, 2025*; 3:00 pm, ESPN+		at Western Michigan	L 60–83	1–5	University Arena (1,284); Kalamazoo, MI
November 25, 2025*; 6:30 pm, BTN		at Ohio State	L 60–113	1–6	Value City Arena (10,140); Columbus, OH
November 29, 2025*; 4:00 pm, ESPN+		Howard	W 79–75	2–6	Knott Arena (1,407); Emmitsburg, MD
December 3, 2025; 7:00 pm, ESPN+		Sacred Heart	L 80–87	2–7 (0–1)	Knott Arena (1,782); Emmitsburg, MD
December 5, 2025; 7:00 pm, ESPN+		at Marist	L 56–64	2–8 (0–2)	McCann Arena (1,759); Poughkeepsie, NY
December 13, 2025*; 6:00 pm, ESPN+		at Loyola	W 81–73	3–8	Reitz Arena (842); Baltimore, MD
December 19, 2025*; 7:00 pm, FloCollege		at Drexel	L 67−75	3−9	Daskalakis Athletic Center (748); Philadelphia, PA
December 21, 2025*; 12:00 pm, ESPN+		Penn State Brandywine	W 73−42	4−9	Knott Arena (1,260); Emmitsburg, MD
December 29, 2025; 7:00 pm, ESPN+		Iona	W 66−59	5−9 (1−2)	Knott Arena (2,176); Emmitsburg, MD
January 2, 2026; 3:00 pm, ESPN+		at Merrimack	L 65−75	5−10 (1−3)	Lawler Arena (1,542); North Andover, MA
January 4, 2026; 2:00 pm, ESPN+		at Quinnipiac	L 69–80	5–11 (1–4)	M&T Bank Arena (1,513); Hamden, CT
January 9, 2026; 7:00 pm, ESPN+		Saint Peter's	W 70–65	6–11 (2–4)	Knott Arena (1,690); Emmitsburg, MD
January 11, 2026; 2:00 pm, ESPN+		Siena	L 50–67	6–12 (2–5)	Knott Arena (2,001); Emmitsburg, MD
January 17, 2026; 12:00 pm, ESPN+		at Canisius	W 78–68	7–12 (3–5)	Koessler Athletic Center (591); Buffalo, NY
January 19, 2026; 2:00 pm, ESPN+		at Niagara	W 68–58	8–12 (4–5)	Gallagher Center (552); Lewiston, NY
January 22, 2026; 7:00 pm, ESPN+		Quinnipiac	L 62–77	8–13 (4–6)	Knott Arena (1,984); Emmitsburg, MD
January 24, 2026; 5:00 pm, ESPN+		Rider	W 71–61	9–13 (5–6)	Knott Arena (2,567); Emmitsburg, MD
January 30, 2026; 7:00 pm, ESPN+		at Saint Peter's	W 68–58	9–14 (5–7)	Run Baby Run Arena (1,012); Jersey City, NJ
February 1, 2026; 2:00 pm, ESPN+		Manhattan	W 72–65	10–14 (6–7)	Knott Arena (2,725); Emmitsburg, MD
February 5, 2026; 7:00 pm, ESPN+		Merrimack	L 70–87	10–15 (6–8)	Knott Arena (1,637); Emmitsburg, MD
February 7, 2026; 7:00 pm, ESPN+		at Iona	W 83–75	11–15 (7–8)	Hynes Athletics Center (1,949); New Rochelle, NY
February 13, 2026; 7:00 pm, ESPN+		at Rider	W 65–55	12–15 (8–8)	Alumni Gymnasium (1,014); Lawrenceville, NJ
February 20, 2026; 7:00 pm, ESPN+		Niagara	W 76–63	13–15 (9–8)	Knott Arena (2,520); Emmitsburg, MD
February 22, 2026; 2:00 pm, ESPN+		Canisius	W 68–47	14–15 (10–8)	Knott Arena (2,626); Emmitsburg, MD
February 27, 2026; 7:00 pm, ESPN+		at Sacred Heart	L 69–77	14–16 (10–9)	William H. Pitt Center (1,016); Fairfield, CT
March 1, 2026; 2:00 pm, ESPN+		at Fairfield	W 69–47	15–16 (11–9)	Leo D. Mahoney Arena (2,713); Fairfield, CT
MAAC tournament
March 7, 2026; 8:30 pm, ESPN+	(6)	vs. (3) Siena; Quarterfinals	L 58–63	15–17	Boardwalk Hall (2,047); Atlantic City, NJ
*Non-conference game. ^{#}Rankings from AP Poll. (#) Tournament seedings in parentheses. All times are in Eastern.
