= 2025–26 Merrimack Warriors men's basketball team =

American college basketball season

2025–26 Merrimack Warriors men's basketball

MAAC regular season champions
- Conference: Metro Atlantic Athletic Conference
- Record: 23–11 (17–3 MAAC)
- Head coach: Joe Gallo (10th season)
- Assistant coaches: Micky Burtnyk; Jimmy Langhurst; Juvaris Hayes; Chris Mohr; Jared Czech
- Home arena: Lawler Arena

2025–26 MAAC men's basketball standings
	Conf.				Overall
Team	W		L	PCT	W		L	PCT
Merrimack	17	–	3	.850	23	–	11	.676
Saint Peter's	14	–	6	.700	17	–	12	.586
Siena †	13	–	7	.650	23	–	11	.676
Quinnipiac	12	–	8	.600	19	–	13	.594
Marist	12	–	8	.600	19	–	12	.613
Mount St. Mary's	11	–	9	.550	15	–	17	.469
Fairfield	11	–	9	.550	21	–	13	.618
Iona	10	–	10	.500	18	–	14	.563
Sacred Heart	9	–	11	.450	14	–	19	.424
Manhattan	8	–	12	.400	12	–	20	.375
Niagara	5	–	15	.250	8	–	22	.267
Canisius	5	–	15	.250	10	–	21	.323
Rider	3	–	17	.150	4	–	25	.138
† 2026 MAAC tournament winner As of March 10, 2026

The 2025–26 Merrimack Warriors men's basketball team represented Merrimack College during the 2025–26 NCAA Division I men's basketball season. The Warriors, led by tenth-year head coach Joe Gallo, played their home games at Lawler Arena in North Andover, Massachusetts as second-year members of the Metro Atlantic Athletic Conference.

During the season the Warriors won a program best 23 games and claimed their first MAAC regular season championship. The Warriors went undefeated at home (11–0), for the first time since 1990–91. During the postseason they reached 2026 MAAC men's basketball tournament final after defeating Sacred Heart and Marist, however they were defeated by Siena 64-54 in the championship game.

== Previous season ==
The Warriors finished the 2024–25 season 18–15, 14–6 in MAAC play, to finish in second place. They defeated Sacred Heart, before being upset by #6 seed and eventual tournament champions Mount St. Mary's in the semifinals of the MAAC tournament.

== Preseason ==
On September 30, 2025, the MAAC released their preseason coaches poll. Merrimack was picked to finish seventh in the conference.

=== Preseason rankings ===
MAAC Preseason Poll
Place	Team	Points
1	Quinnipiac	158 (8)
2	Siena	152 (3)
3	Sacred Heart	140 (2)
4	Manhattan	133
5	Marist	115
6	Iona	104
7	Merrimack	85
8	Fairfield	74
9	Mount St. Mary's	69
10	Rider	59
11	Saint Peter's	48
12	Niagara	26
13	Canisius	20
(#) first-place votes

=== Preseason All-MAAC Teams ===
No players were named to the First, Second or Third Preseason All-MAAC Teams.

== Roster ==
2025–26 Merrimack Warriors men's basketball team
Players
Coaches

Pos.	#	Name	Height	Weight	Year	Previous school	Hometown
F	0	Dylan Veillette	6 ft 7 in (2.01 m)	230 lb (104 kg)	Fr	St. George's School	Ridgefield, Connecticut
G	1	Jaylen Stinson	6 ft 2 in (1.88 m)	170 lb (77 kg)	GS	James Madison	Philadelphia, Pennsylvania
F	2	Aliou Cisse	6 ft 7 in (2.01 m)	190 lb (86 kg)	Sr	Bridgeport	Yonkers, New York
G	3	Ernest Shelton	6 ft 5 in (1.96 m)	180 lb (82 kg)	Jr	Gannon	Philadelphia, Pennsylvania
G	4	Tye Dorset	6 ft 3 in (1.91 m)	175 lb (79 kg)	So	Lenape High School	Mount Laurel, New Jersey
G	5	Kevair Kennedy	6 ft 2 in (1.88 m)	165 lb (75 kg)	Fr	Father Judge High School	Philadelphia, Pennsylvania
F	7	Jacob Moore	6 ft 9 in (2.06 m)	200 lb (91 kg)	Fr	Paul VI Catholic High School	Hamilton, Virginia
G	9	Malik Edmead	5 ft 10 in (1.78 m)	165 lb (75 kg)	RS Sr	Albany	Deer Park, New York
G	10	Andrés Marrero	6 ft 3 in (1.91 m)	200 lb (91 kg)	GS	La Salle	Caracas, Venezuela
G	11	Quinn "Turtle" Kwasniak	6 ft 4 in (1.93 m)	175 lb (79 kg)	Fr	Cornerstone Christian Academy	Chesterland, Ohio
F	12	David Munro	6 ft 8 in (2.03 m)	230 lb (104 kg)	Fr	Camden High School	Neptune, New Jersey
F	14	Brandon Legris	6 ft 7 in (2.01 m)	210 lb (95 kg)	Sr	Perkiomen School	Hatfield, Pennsylvania
F	20	Todd Brogna	6 ft 7 in (2.01 m)	220 lb (100 kg)	Jr	Stonehill	Southborough, Massachusetts
G	21	Brendan Johnson	6 ft 4 in (1.93 m)	205 lb (93 kg)	RS Fr	Calvert Hall High School	Pikesville, Maryland
F	23	KC Ugwuakazi	6 ft 8 in (2.03 m)	230 lb (104 kg)	Jr	East Texas A&M	Boston, Massachusetts

Head coach

- Joe Gallo (Merrimack)

Assistant coach(es)

- Micky Burtnyk (Merrimack)
- Jimmy Langhurst (Robert Morris)
- Juvaris Hayes (Merrimack)
- Chris Mohr (Merrimack)
- Jared Czech (Manhattanville)

Legend

- (C) Team captain
- (S) Suspended
- (I) Ineligible
- (W) Walk-on
- Injured
- Current redshirt

Roster
Last update: November 15, 2025

== Schedule and results ==
Date time, TV	Rank^{#}	Opponent^{#}	Result	Record	Site (attendance) city, state
Regular season
November 3, 2025*; 9:00 pm, YouTube		vs. South Dakota State; Field of 68 Opening Day Marathon	L 66–75	0–1	Sanford Pentagon (1,784); Sioux Falls, SD
November 6, 2025*; 8:00 pm, SECN+		at No. 20 Auburn	L 57–95	0–2	Neville Arena (9,121); Auburn, AL
November 11, 2025*; 8:00 pm, ESPN+		at Tarleton State	L 62–76	0–3	EECU Center (1,353); Stephenville, TX
November 15, 2025*; 1:00 pm, ESPN+		at Boston University	W 91–79	1–3	Case Gym (1,024); Boston, MA
November 19, 2025*; 7:30 pm, ESPN+		Maine	W 72–65	2–3	Lawler Arena (1,572); North Andover, MA
November 21, 2025*; 7:00 pm, SECN+		at No. 10 Florida	L 45–80	2–4	O'Connell Center (10,935); Gainesville, FL
November 28, 2025*; 4:30 pm, ESPN+		at Penn; Cathedral Classic	L 65–77	2–5	Palestra (1,440); Philadelphia, PA
November 29, 2025*; 2:00 pm, ESPN+		vs. Hofstra; Cathedral Classic	L 58–78	2–6	Palestra; Philadelphia, PA
November 30, 2025*; 12:00 pm, ESPN+		vs. La Salle; Cathedral Classic	W 66–60	3–6	Palestra; Philadelphia, PA
December 4, 2025; 7:00 pm, ESPN+		Rider	W 68–66	4–6 (1–0)	Lawler Arena (1,876); North Andover, MA
December 7, 2025; 12:00 pm, ESPN+		Fairfield	W 74–63	5–6 (2–0)	Lawler Arena (1,193); North Andover, MA
December 10, 2025*; 5:00 pm, ESPN+		at Princeton	W 59−56	6−6	Jadwin Gymnasium (1,048); Princeton, NJ
December 14, 2025*; 2:00 pm, ESPN+		at Vermont	L 59−66	6−7	Patrick Gym (2,013); Burlington, VT
December 29, 2025; 2:00 pm, ESPN+		at Sacred Heart	W 80–72	7–7 (3–0)	William H. Pitt Center (642); Fairfield, CT
January 2, 2026; 3:00 pm, ESPN+		Mount St. Mary's	W 75–65	8–7 (4–0)	Lawler Arena (1,542); North Andover, MA
January 4, 2026; 11:00 am, ESPN+		Manhattan	W 73–66	9–7 (5–0)	Lawler Arena (427); North Andover, MA
January 9, 2026; 7:00 pm, ESPN+		at Siena	W 63–59	10–7 (6–0)	MVP Arena (4,833); Albany, NY
January 11, 2026; 2:00 pm, ESPN+		at Saint Peter's	L 63–76	10–8 (6–1)	Run Baby Run Arena (450); Jersey City, NJ
January 17, 2026; 3:00 pm, ESPN+		Quinnipiac	W 83–71	11–8 (7–1)	Lawler Arena (1,300); North Andover, MA
January 19, 2026; 2:00 pm, ESPN+		at Marist	W 68–55	12–8 (8–1)	McCann Arena (1,542); Poughkeepsie, NY
January 22, 2026; 7:00 pm, ESPN+		at Iona	L 60–61	12–9 (8–2)	Hynes Athletics Center (1,820); New Rochelle, NY
January 24, 2026; 3:30 pm, ESPN+		Saint Peter's	W 67–59	13–9 (9–2)	Lawler Arena (1,812); North Andover, MA
February 1, 2026; 1:00 pm, ESPN+		Sacred Heart	W 75–58	14–9 (10–2)	Lawler Arena (1,974); North Andover, MA
February 5, 2026; 7:00 pm, ESPN+		at Mount St. Mary's	W 87–70	15–9 (11–2)	Knott Arena (1,637); Emmitsburg, MD
February 7, 2026; 7:00 pm, ESPN+		at Rider	W 73–47	16–9 (12–2)	Alumni Gymnasium (1,521); Lawrenceville, NJ
February 12, 2026; 7:00 pm, ESPN+		Marist	W 81–56	17–9 (13–2)	Lawler Arena (1,678); North Andover, MA
February 15, 2026; 2:00 pm, ESPN+		at Quinnipiac	W 56–49	18–9 (14–2)	M&T Bank Arena (1,829); Hamden, CT
February 20, 2026; 8:00 pm, ESPNU		Siena	W 79–72 ^{OT}	19–9 (15–2)	Lawler Arena (2,919); North Andover, MA
February 22, 2026; 1:00 pm, ESPN+		Iona	W 88–86 ^{2OT}	20–9 (16–2)	Lawler Arena (2,109); North Andover, MA
February 27, 2026; 7:00 pm, ESPN+		at Canisius	L 62–67	20–10 (16–3)	Koessler Athletic Center (553); Buffalo, NY
March 1, 2026; 2:00 pm, ESPN+		at Niagara	W 73–66	21–10 (17–3)	Gallagher Center (890); Lewiston, NY
MAAC tournament
March 6, 2026; 6:00 pm, ESPN+	(1)	vs. (9) Sacred Heart; Quarterfinals	W 70–48	22–10	Boardwalk Hall; Atlantic City, NJ
March 8, 2026; 6:00 pm, ESPN+	(1)	vs. (5) Marist; Semifinals	W 58–57	23–10	Boardwalk Hall; Atlantic City, NJ
March 10, 2026; 9:00 pm, ESPN2	(1)	vs. (3) Siena; Championship	L 54–64	23–11	Boardwalk Hall; Atlantic City, NJ
*Non-conference game. ^{#}Rankings from AP Poll. (#) Tournament seedings in parentheses. All times are in Eastern.

== Awards ==
- MAAC Player of the Year: Kevair Kennedy
- MAAC Defensive Player of the Year: KC Ugwuakazi
- MAAC Rookie of the Year: Kevair Kennedy
- MAAC Coach of the Year: Joe Gallo
- All MAAC First team: Kevair Kennedy and Ernest Shelton
- MAAC All-Defensive Team: KC Ugwuakazi
- MAAC All-Rookie Team: Kevair Kennedy
