= 2024–25 Fairfield Stags men's basketball team =

American college basketball season

2024–25 Fairfield Stags men's basketball
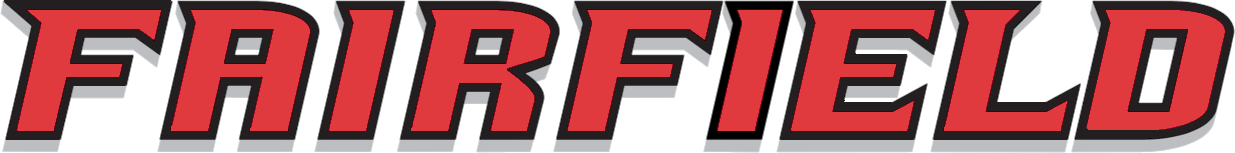
- Conference: Metro Atlantic Athletic Conference
- Record: 12–20 (8–12 MAAC)
- Head coach: Chris Casey (2nd season)
- Assistant coaches: Glenn Braica; Taj Benning; Matt Knezovic; Matt Scott
- Home arena: Leo D. Mahoney Arena

2024–25 MAAC men's basketball standings
	Conf.				Overall
Team	W		L	PCT	W		L	PCT
Quinnipiac	15	–	5	.750	20	–	13	.606
Merrimack	14	–	6	.700	18	–	15	.545
Marist	13	–	7	.650	20	–	10	.667
Iona	12	–	8	.600	17	–	17	.500
Manhattan	12	–	8	.600	17	–	14	.548
Mount St. Mary's †	12	–	8	.600	23	–	13	.639
Sacred Heart	10	–	10	.500	15	–	18	.455
Rider	9	–	11	.450	14	–	19	.424
Siena	9	–	11	.450	14	–	18	.438
Fairfield	8	–	12	.400	12	–	20	.375
Saint Peter's	7	–	13	.350	12	–	16	.429
Niagara	6	–	14	.300	11	–	20	.355
Canisius	3	–	17	.150	3	–	28	.097
† 2025 MAAC tournament winner

The 2024–25 Fairfield Stags men's basketball team represented Fairfield University during the 2024–25 NCAA Division I men's basketball season. The Stags, led by second-year head coach Chris Casey, played their home games at Leo D. Mahoney Arena in Fairfield, Connecticut as members of the Metro Atlantic Athletic Conference.

== Previous season ==
The Stags finished the 2023–24 season 24–13, 14–6 in MAAC play to finish in second place. In the MAAC tournament, they defeated Iona and Marist before falling to Saint Peter's in the championship game. The Stags received an invitation to the CBI, receiving the #7 seed where they defeated Little Rock and Chicago State before falling to eventual tournament champions Seattle in the semifinals.

== Roster ==
2024–25 Fairfield Stags men's basketball team
Players
Coaches

Pos.	#	Name	Height	Weight	Year	Previous school	Hometown
G	0	Deon Perry	5 ft 8 in (1.73 m)	160 lb (73 kg)	Jr	Loyola (MD)	Baltimore, Maryland
F	1	Birima Seck	6 ft 11 in (2.11 m)	200 lb (91 kg)	Sr	New Mexico	Dakar, Senegal
G	3	Jamie Bergens	6 ft 2 in (1.88 m)	195 lb (88 kg)	GS	Drexel	Almere, Netherlands
G	4	Braden Sparks	6 ft 0 in (1.83 m)	185 lb (84 kg)	Jr	Indian Hills CC	Villa Rica, Georgia
G	5	Matt Curtis	6 ft 4 in (1.93 m)	190 lb (86 kg)	So	Avon Old Farms	Ellington, Connecticut
G	6	Aidan May	6 ft 2 in (1.88 m)	180 lb (82 kg)	So	The Winchendon School	Fairfield, Connecticut
G	7	Makuei Riek	6 ft 6 in (1.98 m)	170 lb (77 kg)	RS Fr	Milwaukee	Rochester, Minnesota
G/F	12	Louis Bleechmore	6 ft 7 in (2.01 m)	205 lb (93 kg)	GS	Saint Joseph's	Sydney, Australia
G	13	Noah Best	6 ft 5 in (1.96 m)	175 lb (79 kg)	RS So	Fordham	Bronx, New York
F	14	Kyle Jenkins	6 ft 7 in (2.01 m)	220 lb (100 kg)	GS	Lafayette	Higganum, Connecticut
F	15	Isaac Munkadi	6 ft 10 in (2.08 m)	230 lb (104 kg)	Fr	Bridgeport Prep	Kinshasa, DR Congo
G	16	Prophet Johnson	6 ft 3 in (1.91 m)	185 lb (84 kg)	Jr	Southern Utah	Dayton, Ohio
G	20	Ryan McPartlan	6 ft 4 in (1.93 m)	190 lb (86 kg)	Jr	Fordham Prep	White Plains, New York
G	21	Tanner Ostop	6 ft 0 in (1.83 m)	165 lb (75 kg)	So	Northwest Catholic HS	West Hartford, Connecticut
G	22	Luke Davidson	6 ft 0 in (1.83 m)	185 lb (84 kg)	Jr	Fayetteville–Manlius HS	Fayetteville, New York
G	24	Joe Ganton	6 ft 4 in (1.93 m)	190 lb (86 kg)	So	West Essex HS	North Caldwell, New Jersey
G/F	25	Michael Rogan	6 ft 6 in (1.98 m)	215 lb (98 kg)	RS So	South Kent School	Saratoga Springs, New York
F	33	Peyton Smith	6 ft 10 in (2.08 m)	235 lb (107 kg)	So	Hudson Falls HS	Hudson Falls, New York

Head coach

- Chris Casey (Western Connecticut St.)

Assistant coach(es)

- Glenn Braica (Queens College)
- Taj Benning (Fairfield)
- Matt Knezovic (Hartwick)
- Matt Scott (Niagara)

Legend

- (C) Team captain
- (S) Suspended
- (I) Ineligible
- (W) Walk-on
- Injured
- Current redshirt

Roster
Last update: November 10, 2024

== Schedule and results ==
Date time, TV	Rank^{#}	Opponent^{#}	Result	Record	Site (attendance) city, state
Regular season
November 4, 2024*; 8:00 pm, ESPN+		at Rhode Island	L 58–96	0–1	Ryan Center (4,376); Kingston, RI
November 9, 2024*; 4:00 pm, FS2		at Georgetown	L 57–69	0–2	Capital One Arena (5,208); Washington, D.C.
November 12, 2024*; 7:00 pm, ESPN+		at New Hampshire	W 62–56	1–2	Lundholm Gym (204); Durham, NH
November 15, 2024*; 7:00 pm, ESPN+		John Jay	W 93–44	2–2	Leo D. Mahoney Arena (2,187); Fairfield, CT
November 19, 2024*; 7:00 pm, ESPN+		Drexel	L 61–67	2–3	Leo D. Mahoney Arena (1,581); Fairfield, CT
November 23, 2024*; 2:30 pm, ESPN+		vs. Yale; Hall of Fame Tip-Off	L 66–91	2–4	Mohegan Sun Arena (2,100); Uncasville, CT
November 24, 2024*; 1:00 pm, ESPN+		vs. Vermont; Hall of Fame Tip-Off	W 67–66	3–4	Mohegan Sun Arena; Uncasville, CT
December 1, 2024*; 2:00 pm, ESPN+		Fairleigh Dickinson	W 78–74	4–4	Leo D. Mahoney Arena (1,858); Fairfield, CT
December 4, 2024; 7:00 pm, ESPN+		Rider	W 78–75	5–4 (1–0)	Leo D. Mahoney Arena (1,578); Fairfield, CT
December 8, 2024; 2:00 pm, ESPN+		at Mount St. Mary's	L 94–101	5–5 (1–1)	Knott Arena (1,213); Emmitsburg, MD
December 18, 2024*; 7:00 pm, ESPN+		Central Connecticut	L 63–64	5–6	Leo D. Mahoney Arena (2,058); Fairfield, CT
December 21, 2024*; 1:00 pm, FloHoops		at Monmouth	L 74–88	5–7	OceanFirst Bank Center (1,804); West Long Branch, NJ
December 28, 2024*; 4:00 pm, ESPN+		at Columbia	L 72–85	5–8	Levien Gymnasium (1,185); New York, NY
January 3, 2025; 3:00 pm, ESPN+		at Merrimack	L 54–67	5–9 (1–2)	Lawler Arena (943); North Andover, MA
January 10, 2025; 7:00 pm, ESPN+		Iona	W 68–64	6–9 (2–2)	Leo D. Mahoney Arena (2,162); Fairfield, CT
January 12, 2025; 2:00 pm, ESPN+		at Marist	L 51–61	6–10 (2–3)	McCann Arena (1,669); Poughkeepsie, NY
January 16, 2025; 7:00 pm, ESPN+		Niagara	W 70–66	7–10 (3–3)	Leo D. Mahoney Arena (1,127); Fairfield, CT
January 18, 2025; 2:00 pm, ESPN+		Canisius	L 67–78	7–11 (3–4)	Leo D. Mahoney Arena (2,020); Fairfield, CT
January 23, 2025; 7:00 pm, ESPN+		at Manhattan	W 87–84 ^{OT}	8–11 (4–4)	Draddy Gymnasium (410); Riverdale, NY
January 25, 2025; 7:00 pm, ESPN+		Merrimack	L 54–75	8–12 (4–5)	Leo D. Mahoney Arena (2,278); Fairfield, CT
January 31, 2025; 7:00 pm, ESPN+		at Quinnipiac	L 69–81	8–13 (4–6)	M&T Bank Arena (2,812); Hamden, CT
February 2, 2025; 1:00 pm, ESPN+		at Iona	L 64–87	8–14 (4–7)	Hynes Athletics Center (2,082); New Rochelle, NY
February 6, 2025; 7:00 pm, ESPN+		Marist	W 59–56	9–14 (5–7)	Leo D. Mahoney Arena (1,868); Fairfield, CT
February 8, 2025; 7:00 pm, ESPN+		Sacred Heart	L 71–77	9–15 (5–8)	Leo D. Mahoney Arena (3,470); Fairfield, CT
February 14, 2025; 7:00 pm, ESPN+		at Saint Peter's	L 52–65	9–16 (5–9)	Run Baby Run Arena (442); Jersey City, NJ
February 16, 2025; 2:00 pm, ESPN+		Manhattan	L 67–80	9–17 (5–10)	Leo D. Mahoney Arena (2,689); Fairfield, CT
February 21, 2025; 7:00 pm, ESPN+		at Rider	W 69–49	10–17 (6–10)	Alumni Gymnasium (1,650); Lawrenceville, NJ
February 28, 2025; 7:00 pm, ESPN+		Mount St. Mary's	W 69–62	11–17 (7–10)	Leo D. Mahoney Arena (2,113); Fairfield, CT
March 2, 2025; 2:00 pm, ESPN+		at Sacred Heart	L 62–83	11–18 (7–11)	William H. Pitt Center (1,749); Fairfield, CT
March 6, 2025; 7:00 pm, ESPN+		at Siena	L 64–68	11–19 (7–12)	MVP Arena (5,575); Albany, NY
March 8, 2025; 7:00 pm, ESPN+		Quinnipiac	W 83–74	12–19 (8–12)	Leo D. Mahoney Arena (2,903); Fairfield, CT
MAAC tournament
March 11, 2025; 8:30 pm, ESPN+	(10)	vs. (7) Sacred Heart; First round	L 58–71	12–20	Boardwalk Hall (1,928); Atlantic City, NJ
*Non-conference game. ^{#}Rankings from AP Poll. (#) Tournament seedings in parentheses. All times are in Eastern.
