= 2024–25 Niagara Purple Eagles men's basketball team =

American college basketball season

2024–25 Niagara Purple Eagles men's basketball
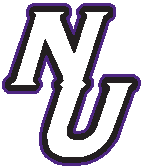
- Conference: Metro Atlantic Athletic Conference
- Record: 11–20 (6–14 MAAC)
- Head coach: Greg Paulus (6th season)
- Assistant coaches: Tyler Kelly; Chris Buchanan; Austin Kelley; Will Holland
- Home arena: Gallagher Center

2024–25 MAAC men's basketball standings
	Conf.				Overall
Team	W		L	PCT	W		L	PCT
Quinnipiac	15	–	5	.750	20	–	13	.606
Merrimack	14	–	6	.700	18	–	15	.545
Marist	13	–	7	.650	20	–	10	.667
Iona	12	–	8	.600	17	–	17	.500
Manhattan	12	–	8	.600	17	–	14	.548
Mount St. Mary's †	12	–	8	.600	23	–	13	.639
Sacred Heart	10	–	10	.500	15	–	18	.455
Rider	9	–	11	.450	14	–	19	.424
Siena	9	–	11	.450	14	–	18	.438
Fairfield	8	–	12	.400	12	–	20	.375
Saint Peter's	7	–	13	.350	12	–	16	.429
Niagara	6	–	14	.300	11	–	20	.355
Canisius	3	–	17	.150	3	–	28	.097
† 2025 MAAC tournament winner

The 2024–25 Niagara Purple Eagles men's basketball team represented Niagara University during the 2024–25 NCAA Division I men's basketball season. The Purple Eagles, led by sixth-year head coach Greg Paulus, played their home games at the Gallagher Center in Lewiston, New York as members of the Metro Atlantic Athletic Conference (MAAC).

== Previous season ==
The Purple Eagles finished the 2023–24 season 16–16, 11–9 in MAAC play to finish in sixth place. They defeated Siena in the first round of the MAAC tournament before losing to Marist in the quarterfinals.

== Roster ==
2024–25 Niagara Purple Eagles men's basketball team
Players
Coaches

Pos.	#	Name	Height	Weight	Year	Previous school	Hometown
F	0	Olumide Adelodun	6 ft 5 in (1.96 m)	215 lb (98 kg)	Sr	Winona State	Calgary, Alberta
F	1	Jaeden Marshall	6 ft 4 in (1.93 m)	205 lb (93 kg)	Sr	Omaha	Hinesville, Georgia
G	2	Samuel Cole	5 ft 11 in (1.8 m)	—	Fr	Good Vision Academy	Sugar Land, Texas
G	4	Josiah Davis	6 ft 3 in (1.91 m)	195 lb (88 kg)	Jr	Tennessee Tech	Kitchener, Ontario
G	5	Justin Page	6 ft 5 in (1.96 m)	185 lb (84 kg)	So	Cal Poly	Peoria, Illinois
G	6	Damondre McKnight	6 ft 2 in (1.88 m)	—	So	Paris Junior College	McKinney, Texas
F	8	Justice Smith	6 ft 6 in (1.98 m)	215 lb (98 kg)	GS	East Tennessee State	Lyons, New York
G	10	Landon Williams	6 ft 4 in (1.93 m)	—	Fr	North Farmington High School	Farmington Hills, Michigan
G	11	Jahari Williamson	6 ft 1 in (1.85 m)	165 lb (75 kg)	So	Valparaiso	Pickering, Ontario
C	12	Jhaylon Martinez	6 ft 11 in (2.11 m)	260 lb (118 kg)	GS	UC Riverside	Vallejo, California
G	24	Zion Russell	6 ft 2 in (1.88 m)	185 lb (84 kg)	RS Jr	Northern Illinois	Upper Marlboro, Maryland
F	32	Will Shortt	6 ft 8 in (2.03 m)	215 lb (98 kg)	Fr	IMG Academy	Sydney, Australia
C	33	James Henderson Jr.	6 ft 9 in (2.06 m)	230 lb (104 kg)	Jr	Bethune–Cookman	Miami, Florida
F	35	AJ McBride	6 ft 5 in (1.96 m)	—	Fr	Moeller High School	Cincinnati, Ohio

Head coach

- Greg Paulus (Duke)

Assistant coach(es)

- Kevin Devitt (DePaul)
- Tyler Kelly (Florida Southern)
- Will Holland (Mount St. Mary's)
- Austin Kelley (St. Bonaventure)

Legend

- (C) Team captain
- (S) Suspended
- (I) Ineligible
- (W) Walk-on
- Injured
- Current redshirt

Roster
Last update: November 9, 2024

== Schedule and results ==
Date time, TV	Rank^{#}	Opponent^{#}	Result	Record	Site (attendance) city, state
Regular season
November 4, 2024*; 6:30 p.m., ESPN+		Houghton	W 100–65	1–0	Gallagher Center (1,157); Lewiston, NY
November 7, 2024*; 8 p.m., BTN		at Michigan State	L 60–96	1–1	Breslin Center (14,797); East Lansing, MI
November 10, 2024*; 1:00 p.m., ESPN+		at Detroit Mercy	L 78–84 ^{OT}	1–2	Calihan Hall (807); Detroit, MI
November 19, 2024*; 7:00 p.m., ESPN+		at Bowling Green	L 68–76	1–3	Stroh Center (1,632); Bowling Green, OH
November 21, 2024*; 7:00 p.m., ESPN+		at Kent State	L 73–76	1–4	MAC Center (1,886); Kent, OH
November 29, 2024*; 2:00 p.m., ESPN+		vs. Binghamton; Lafeyette Multi-Team Event	W 65–62	2–4	Kirby Sports Center (329); Easton, PA
November 30, 2024*; 4:30 p.m., ESPN+		at Lafayette; Lafeyette Multi-Team Event	L 47–59	2–5	Kirby Sports Center (907); Easton, PA
December 1, 2024*; 12:00 p.m., ESPN+		vs. LIU; Lafeyette Multi-Team Event	W 60–52	3–5	Kirby Sports Center (209); Easton, PA
December 6, 2024; 6:30 p.m., ESPN+		Siena	W 69–68	4–5 (1–0)	Gallagher Center (1,050); Lewiston, NY
December 8, 2024; 1:00 p.m., ESPN+		Merrimack	L 62–80	4–6 (1–1)	Gallagher Center (860); Lewiston, NY
December 14, 2024*; 6:00 p.m., ESPN+		Saint Francis	W 69–66	5–6	Gallagher Center (738); Lewiston, NY
December 21, 2024*; 1:00 p.m., ESPN+		at St. Bonaventure	L 52–71	5–7	Reilly Center (3,795); Olean, NY
December 29, 2024*; 2:00 p.m., ESPN+		Le Moyne	W 88–69	6–7	Gallagher Center (476); Lewiston, NY
January 5, 2025; 2:00 p.m., ESPN+		at Mount St. Mary's	L 62–68	6–8 (1–2)	Gallagher Center (1,581); Lewiston, NY
January 10, 2025; 6:30 p.m., ESPN+		Saint Peter's	W 70–60	7–8 (2–2)	Gallagher Center (708); Lewiston, NY
January 12, 2025; 2:00 p.m., ESPN+		Rider	L 65–68	7–9 (2–3)	Gallagher Center (509); Lewiston, NY
January 16, 2025; 7:00 p.m., ESPN+		at Fairfield	L 66–70	7–10 (2–4)	Leo D. Mahoney Arena (1,127); Fairfield, CT
January 18, 2025; 2:00 p.m., ESPN+		at Manhattan	L 65–72	7–11 (2–5)	Draddy Gymnasium (654); Riverdale, NY
January 23, 20225; 6:30 p.m., ESPN+		Marist	L 65–67 ^{OT}	7–12 (2–6)	Gallagher Center (917); Lewiston, NY
January 25, 2025; 2:00 p.m., ESPN+		Sacred Heart	L 77–86	7–13 (2–7)	Gallagher Center (813); Lewiston, NY
January 31, 2025; 7:00 p.m., ESPN+		at Canisius; Battle of the Bridge	W 64–63	8–13 (3–7)	Koessler Athletic Center (1,456); Buffalo, NY
February 6, 2025; 7:00 p.m., ESPN+		at Merrimack	L 59–64	8–14 (3–8)	Hammel Court (1,867); North Andover, MA
February 8, 2025; 2:00 p.m., ESPN+		at Quinnipiac	W 76–75	9–14 (4–8)	M&T Bank Arena (1,714); Hamden, CT
February 12, 2025; 6:30 p.m., ESPN+		Canisius; Battle of the Bridge	W 71–60	10–14 (5–8)	Gallagher Center (1,058); Lewiston, NY
February 14, 2025; 6:30 p.m., ESPN+		Mount St. Mary's	L 83–84	10–15 (5–9)	Gallagher Center (837); Lewiston, NY
February 21, 2025; 7:00 p.m., ESPN+		at Siena	L 60–94	10–16 (5–10)	MVP Arena (5,166); Albany, NY
February 23, 2025; 6:30 p.m., ESPN+		at Marist	L 61–64	10–17 (5–11)	McCann Arena (2,444); Poughkeepsie, NY
February 28, 2025; 6:30 p.m., ESPN+		Iona	L 63–65	10–18 (5–12)	Gallagher Center (966); Lewiston, NY
March 2, 2025; 2:00 p.m., ESPN+		Manhattan	L 70–85	10–19 (5–13)	Gallagher Center (1,029); Lewiston, NY
March 6, 2025; 7:00 p.m., ESPN+		at Saint Peter's	W 78–68 ^{OT}	11–19 (6–13)	Run Baby Run Arena (373); Jersey City, NJ
March 8, 2025; 2:00 p.m., ESPN+		at Rider	L 76–77	11–20 (6–14)	Alumni Gymnasium (1,568); Lawrenceville, NJ
*Non-conference game. ^{#}Rankings from AP poll. (#) Tournament seedings in parentheses. All times are in Eastern.
