= 2024–25 Canisius Golden Griffins men's basketball team =

American college basketball season

2024–25 Canisius Golden Griffins men's basketball
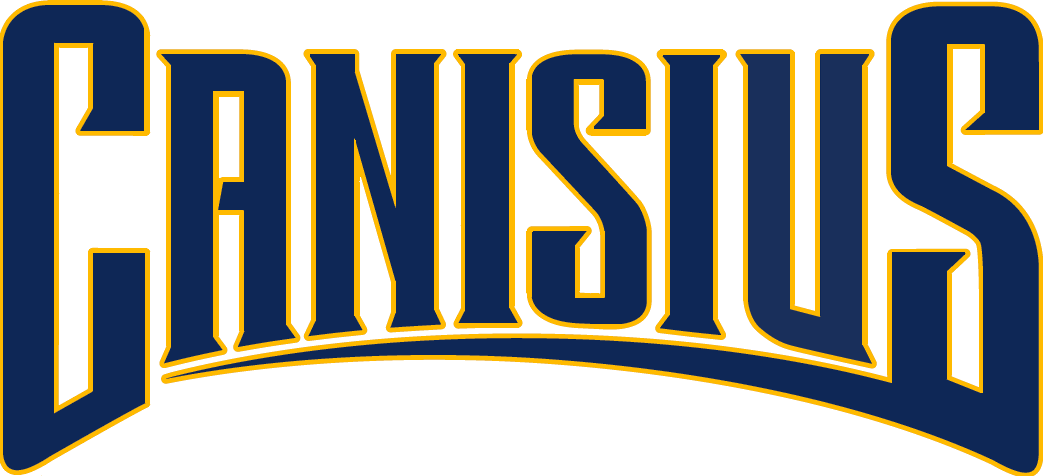
- Conference: Metro Atlantic Athletic Conference
- Record: 3–28 (3–17 MAAC)
- Head coach: Jim Christian (1st season)
- Assistant coaches: Bill Wuczynski; Herschel Jenkins; Kevin Zabo
- Home arena: Koessler Athletic Center

2024–25 MAAC men's basketball standings
	Conf.				Overall
Team	W		L	PCT	W		L	PCT
Quinnipiac	15	–	5	.750	20	–	13	.606
Merrimack	14	–	6	.700	18	–	15	.545
Marist	13	–	7	.650	20	–	10	.667
Iona	12	–	8	.600	17	–	17	.500
Manhattan	12	–	8	.600	17	–	14	.548
Mount St. Mary's †	12	–	8	.600	23	–	13	.639
Sacred Heart	10	–	10	.500	15	–	18	.455
Rider	9	–	11	.450	14	–	19	.424
Siena	9	–	11	.450	14	–	18	.438
Fairfield	8	–	12	.400	12	–	20	.375
Saint Peter's	7	–	13	.350	12	–	16	.429
Niagara	6	–	14	.300	11	–	20	.355
Canisius	3	–	17	.150	3	–	28	.097
† 2025 MAAC tournament winner

The 2024–25 Canisius Golden Griffins men's basketball team represented Canisius University during the 2024–25 NCAA Division I men's basketball season. The Golden Griffins, led by first-year head coach Jim Christian, played their home games at the Koessler Athletic Center in Buffalo, New York as members of the Metro Atlantic Athletic Conference (MAAC).

== Previous season ==
The Golden Griffins finished the 2023–24 season 14–18, 8–12 in MAAC play, to finish in ninth place. They defeated Mount St. Mary's before falling to top-seeded Quinnipiac in the quarterfinals of the MAAC tournament.

On March 16, 2024, the school announced that they would be parting ways with head coach Reggie Witherspoon, ending his eight-year tenure at the helm. On March 8, former Boston College head coach and Kent State assistant Jim Christian was named Witherspoon's successor.

== Roster ==
2024–25 Canisius Golden Griffins men's basketball team
Players
Coaches

Pos.	#	Name	Height	Weight	Year	Previous school	Hometown
F	0	Alonso Easterling	6 ft 11 in (2.11 m)	210 lb (95 kg)	Fr	Peninsula Catholic High School	Fayetteville, NC
G	1	Cam Palesse	6 ft 5 in (1.96 m)	205 lb (93 kg)	RS So	Valparaiso	Waukesha, WI
F	2	TJ Porter	6 ft 8 in (2.03 m)	215 lb (98 kg)	Sr	Georgia Highlands	Atlanta, GA
G	3	Anthony Benard	6 ft 0 in (1.83 m)	170 lb (77 kg)	So	Mercer	Detroit, MI
G	4	William Jr. Scott	6 ft 4 in (1.93 m)	190 lb (86 kg)	So	Triton College	Akron, OH
G	5	Nicco DiGiulio	5 ft 11 in (1.8 m)	170 lb (77 kg)	RS Fr	Williamsville South High School	Williamsville, NY
G	6	Tana Kopa	6 ft 6 in (1.98 m)	180 lb (82 kg)	Sr	LIU	Perth, Australia
F	7	Dylan Godfrey	6 ft 8 in (2.03 m)	205 lb (93 kg)	So	East Los Angeles College	Newport Beach, CA
G	8	Carter Jackson	6 ft 3 in (1.91 m)	180 lb (82 kg)	Fr	Garfield Heights High School	Cleveland, OH
F	9	Evan van der Plas	6 ft 5 in (1.96 m)	190 lb (86 kg)	Fr	BC Triple Threat U-19	Rosmalen, Netherlands
F	11	Tyson Oghene	6 ft 6 in (1.98 m)	220 lb (100 kg)	Jr	Allegany College of Maryland	Malmö, Sweden
F	15	Maji David-Maji	6 ft 5 in (1.96 m)	245 lb (111 kg)	Jr	SUNY Erie	Kogi, Nigeria
F	24	Jasman Sangha	6 ft 8 in (2.03 m)	230 lb (104 kg)	GS	Cal State Northridge	Brampton, ON
F	33	Gianni Thompson	6 ft 8 in (2.03 m)	205 lb (93 kg)	Jr	UMass	Dorchester, MA
G	34	Paul McMillan IV	6 ft 3 in (1.91 m)	180 lb (82 kg)	Jr	Central Michigan	Cincinnati, OH

Head coach

- Jim Christian (Rhode Island)

Assistant coach(es)

- Bill Wuczynski (UNLV)
- Herschel Jenkins (Staten Island)
- Kevin Zabo (Kent State)

Legend

- (C) Team captain
- (S) Suspended
- (I) Ineligible
- (W) Walk-on
- Injured
- Current redshirt

Roster
Last update: November 10, 2024

== Schedule and results ==
Date time, TV	Rank^{#}	Opponent^{#}	Result	Record	Site (attendance) city, state
Regular season
November 4, 2024*; 10:00 p.m., ESPN+		at No. 10 Arizona	L 64–93	0–1	McKale Center (13,597); Tucson, AZ
November 9, 2024*; 4:00 p.m., ESPN+		St. Bonaventure	L 78–87	0–2	Koessler Athletic Center (1,904); Buffalo, NY
November 13, 2024*; 7:00 p.m., NEC Front Row		at Mercyhurst	L 52–62	0–3	Owen McCormick Court (987); Erie, PA
November 16, 2024*; 3:00 p.m.		vs. SIU Edwardsville; Bronco Classic	L 58–76	0–4	University Arena (186); Kalamazoo, MI
November 17, 2024*; 12:00 p.m., ESPN+		at Western Michigan; Bronco Classic	L 69–92	0–5	University Arena (1,406); Kalamazoo, MI
November 19, 2024*; 7:00 p.m., B1G+		at Maryland	L 37–108	0–6	Xfinity Center (9,485); College Park, MD
November 23, 2024*; 1:00 p.m., ESPN+		Brown	L 76–83	0–7	Koessler Athletic Center (953); Buffalo, NY
November 27, 2024*; 4:00 p.m., ESPN+		at Robert Morris	L 64–72	0–8	UPMC Events Center; Moon Township, PA
December 6, 2024; 7:00 p.m., ESPN+		Merrimack	L 52–60	0–9 (0–1)	Koessler Athletic Center (755); Buffalo, NY
December 8, 2024; 1:00 p.m., ESPN+		Siena	L 53–66	0–10 (0–2)	Koessler Athletic Center (816); Buffalo, NY
December 14, 2024*; 1:00 p.m., ESPN+		Maine	L 79–84	0–11	Koessler Athletic Center (830); Buffalo, NY
December 18, 2024*; 8:00 p.m., Marquee/ESPN+		at Loyola Chicago	L 60–72	0–12	Joseph J. Gentile Arena (1,965); Chicago, IL
December 21, 2024*; 2:00 p.m., ESPN+		at Bradley	L 59–92	0–13	Carver Arena (5,002); Peoria, IL
January 5, 2025; 2:00 p.m., ESPN+		at Sacred Heart	L 82–99	0–14 (0–3)	William H. Pitt Center (682); Fairfield, CT
January 10, 2025; 7:00 p.m., ESPN+		Rider	W 85–67	1–14 (1–3)	Koessler Athletic Center (711); Buffalo, NY
January 12, 2025; 1:00 p.m., ESPN+		Saint Peter's	L 49–62	1–15 (1–4)	Koessler Athletic Center (457); Buffalo, NY
January 16, 2025; 7:00 p.m., ESPN+		at Iona	L 61–82	1–16 (1–5)	Hynes Athletics Center (1,369); New Rochelle, NY
January 18, 2025; 2:00 p.m., ESPN+		at Fairfield	W 78–67	2–16 (2–5)	Leo D. Mahoney Arena (2,020); Fairfield, CT
January 23, 2025; 7:00 p.m., ESPN+		Sacred Heart	L 84–93	2–17 (2–6)	Koessler Athletic Center (533); Buffalo, NY
January 25, 2025; 1:00 p.m., ESPN+		Marist	L 47–70	2–18 (2–7)	Koessler Athletic Center (837); Buffalo, NY
January 31, 2025; 7:00 p.m., ESPN+		Niagara; Battle of the Bridge	L 63–64	2–19 (2–8)	Koessler Athletic Center (1,456); Buffalo, NY
February 6, 2025; 7:00 p.m., ESPN+		at Quinnipiac	L 71–89	2–20 (2–9)	M&T Bank Arena (852); Hamden, CT
February 8, 2025; 3:00 p.m., ESPN+		at Merrimack	L 51–69	2–21 (2–10)	Hammel Court (1,186); North Andover, MA
February 12, 2025; 6:30 p.m., ESPN+		at Niagara; Battle of the Bridge	L 60–71	2–22 (2–11)	Gallagher Center (1,058); Lewiston, NY
February 16, 2025; 1:00 p.m., ESPN+		Mount St. Mary's	L 66–73	2–23 (2–12)	Koessler Athletic Center (548); Buffalo, NY
February 21, 2025; 7:00 p.m., ESPN+		at Marist	L 81–89	2–24 (2–13)	McCann Arena (2,253); Poughkeepsie, NY
February 23, 2025; 2:00 p.m., ESPN+		at Siena	W 93–88	3–24 (3–13)	MVP Arena (5,838); Albany, NY
February 28, 2025; 7:00 p.m., ESPN+		Manhattan	L 72–77	3–25 (3–14)	Koessler Athletic Center (619); Buffalo, NY
March 2, 2025; 1:00 p.m., ESPN+		Iona	L 52–82	3–26 (3–15)	Koessler Athletic Center (596); Buffalo, NY
March 6, 2025; 7:00 p.m., ESPN+		at Rider	L 50–78	3–27 (3–16)	Alumni Gymnasium (1,514); Lawrenceville, NJ
March 8, 2025; 2:00 p.m., ESPN+		at Saint Peter's	L 62–70	3–28 (3–17)	Run Baby Run Arena (503); Jersey City, NJ
*Non-conference game. ^{#}Rankings from AP poll. (#) Tournament seedings in parentheses. All times are in Eastern.
