= Donny Lind =

American college basketball coach

Current position
- Title: Head coach
- Team: Mount St. Mary's
- Conference: MAAC
- Record: 38–30 (.559)

Biographical details
- Born: December 15, 1986 (age 39); New Knoxville, Ohio, U.S.
- Education: Loyola Maryland ('10)

Coaching career (HC unless noted)
- 2013–2016: Mount St. Mary's (assistant)
- 2016–2021: Radford (assistant)
- 2021–2024: UNC Greensboro (assistant)
- 2024–present: Mount St. Mary's

Administrative career (AD unless noted)
- 2010–2013: VCU (video coordinator)

Head coaching record
- Overall: 38–30 (.559)
- Tournaments: 1–1 (NCAA)

Accomplishments and honors

Championships
- MAAC tournament (2025)

Donny Lind is an American college basketball coach who has been the men's basketball head coach at Mount St. Mary's University since April 20, 2024.

== Coaching career ==
Lind was a student manager and video coordinator with the Loyola Greyhounds men's basketball program under head coach Jimmy Patsos at Loyola University Maryland where he graduated with a Bachelor of Arts in Economics in 2010.

He was a graduate manager for one season before his promotion to video coordinator during his three years with Shaka Smart's staff at Virginia Commonwealth University (VCU) from 2010 to 2013. The Rams qualified for the NCAA Division I men's basketball tournament in all three seasons, reaching the Final Four for the first time in the program's history in 2011. Lind earned a Master of Sport Leadership degree from VCU.

He joined the staff of his former VCU assistant coaching colleague Jamion Christian at Mount St. Mary's University in 2013. The Mountaineers appeared in the NCAA tournament in the first of Lind's three years at Mount St. Mary's in 2014.

Lind was reunited with another former VCU assistant coaching colleague Mike Jones at Radford University when he was named an assistant in charge of the offense on June 23, 2016. The Highlanders made it to the NCAA tournament in the second of his five seasons at Radford in 2018. He made the transition with Jones to the University of North Carolina at Greensboro in a similar capacity in 2021.

He returned to Mount St. Mary's when he accepted its men's basketball head coaching position on April 20, 2024. He succeeded Dan Engelstad who announced his resignation ten days prior on April 10. Lind inherited a program with a 40–55 overall record in the three seasons since its previous NCAA tournament appearance in 2021.

=== Mount St. Mary's (2024–present) ===
In his first season as head coach, Lind led Mount St. Mary’s to a 23–13 overall record, including a 12–8 mark in MAAC play. The Mountaineers won the 2025 MAAC Tournament, securing the program’s first-ever MAAC championship and an automatic berth in the NCAA Tournament. In the First Four, Mount St. Mary’s defeated American University 83–72 to advance to the Round of 64, marking the school’s third NCAA Tournament win in program history.

A signature moment of the season came on December 21, 2024, when Mount St. Mary’s defeated the University of Miami (FL) 78–74 in overtime on the road. It was the Mount’s first win over a Power Conference opponent since 1995 and the program’s second-ever road win against an ACC team.

The program’s success under Lind in his first year earned him a multi-year contract extension through the 2030–31 season.

== Head coaching record ==
Record table
Season	Team	Overall	Conference	Standing	Postseason
Mount St. Mary's Mountaineers (MAAC) (2024–present)
2024–25	Mount St. Mary's	23–13	10–8	T–4th	NCAA Division I Round of 64
2025–26	Mount St. Mary's	15–17	11–9	T–6th	
2026–27	Mount St. Mary's	0–0	0–0		
Mount St. Mary's:		38–30 (.559)	21–17 (.553)		
Total:		38–30 (.559)			
National champion Postseason invitational champion Conference regular season champion Conference regular season and conference tournament champion Division regular season champion Division regular season and conference tournament champion Conference tournament champion

== Personal life ==
Lind is a native of New Knoxville, Ohio.
