= 2024–25 Rider Broncs men's basketball team =

American college basketball season

2024–25 Rider Broncs men's basketball
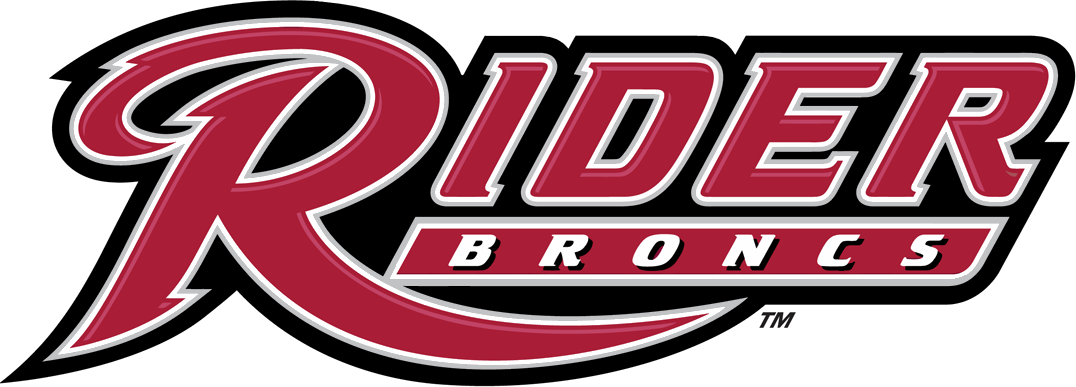
- Conference: Metro Atlantic Athletic Conference
- Record: 14–19 (9–11 MAAC)
- Head coach: Kevin Baggett (13th season)
- Associate head coach: Dino Presley
- Assistant coaches: Geoff Arnold; Kim Waiters
- Home arena: Alumni Gymnasium

2024–25 MAAC men's basketball standings
	Conf.				Overall
Team	W		L	PCT	W		L	PCT
Quinnipiac	15	–	5	.750	20	–	13	.606
Merrimack	14	–	6	.700	18	–	15	.545
Marist	13	–	7	.650	20	–	10	.667
Iona	12	–	8	.600	17	–	17	.500
Manhattan	12	–	8	.600	17	–	14	.548
Mount St. Mary's †	12	–	8	.600	23	–	13	.639
Sacred Heart	10	–	10	.500	15	–	18	.455
Rider	9	–	11	.450	14	–	19	.424
Siena	9	–	11	.450	14	–	18	.438
Fairfield	8	–	12	.400	12	–	20	.375
Saint Peter's	7	–	13	.350	12	–	16	.429
Niagara	6	–	14	.300	11	–	20	.355
Canisius	3	–	17	.150	3	–	28	.097
† 2025 MAAC tournament winner

The 2024–25 Rider Broncs men's basketball team represented Rider University during the 2024–25 NCAA Division I men's basketball season. The Broncs, led by 13th-year head coach Kevin Baggett, played their home games at the Alumni Gymnasium in Lawrenceville, New Jersey as members of the Metro Atlantic Athletic Conference.

== Previous season ==
The Broncs finished the 2023–24 season 15–17, 12–8 in MAAC play to finish in a three-way tie for third place. They were defeated by eventual tournament champions Saint Peter's in the quarterfinals of the MAAC tournament.

== Roster ==
2024–25 Rider Broncs men's basketball team
Players
Coaches

Pos.	#	Name	Height	Weight	Year	Previous school	Hometown
G/F	0	Zion Cruz	6 ft 5 in (1.96 m)	195 lb (88 kg)	Jr	DePaul	Trenton, New Jersey
G	2	Ruben Rodriguez	6 ft 2 in (1.88 m)	175 lb (79 kg)	So	Reading High School	Reading, Pennsylvania
F	5	Jay Alvarez	6 ft 5 in (1.96 m)	210 lb (95 kg)	RS Sr	Houston Christian	Waynesboro, Pennsylvania
F	7	Ife West-Ingram	6 ft 6 in (1.98 m)	205 lb (93 kg)	So	Abington Friends School	Philadelphia, Pennsylvania
F	8	Tank Byard	6 ft 8 in (2.03 m)	215 lb (98 kg)	Sr	Alcorn State	Atlantic City, New Jersey
G	11	Flash Burton	6 ft 3 in (1.91 m)	165 lb (75 kg)	Fr	Cardinal O'Hara High School	Philadelphia, Pennsylvania
G	12	Andre Young	5 ft 11 in (1.8 m)	160 lb (73 kg)	Jr	Gulf Coast State College	Mableton, Georgia
G	13	Zocko Littleton Jr.	6 ft 3 in (1.91 m)	185 lb (84 kg)	Jr	Chipola College	Albany, Georgia
C	14	Alaaeddine Boutayeb	7 ft 2 in (2.18 m)	230 lb (104 kg)	Jr	Miami Dade College	Casablanca, Morocco
G	20	Maurizio D'Alessandro	6 ft 1 in (1.85 m)	185 lb (84 kg)	Fr	Fork Union Military Academy	Charlottesville, Virginia
F	21	Cole McCabe	6 ft 8 in (2.03 m)	220 lb (100 kg)	Fr	IMG Academy	Miami Beach, Florida
G	22	Jack McFadden	6 ft 4 in (1.93 m)	185 lb (84 kg)	Jr	Maine-Endwell High School	Endwell, New York
F	31	Tyriek Weeks	6 ft 6 in (1.98 m)	200 lb (91 kg)	Jr	Miami Dade College	Warwick, Rhode Island
F	33	Tariq Ingraham	6 ft 9 in (2.06 m)	255 lb (116 kg)	GS	Wake Forest	Philadelphia, Pennsylvania
G	35	T.J. Weeks Jr.	6 ft 4 in (1.93 m)	190 lb (86 kg)	GS	UMass	Warwick, Rhode Island

Head coach

- Kevin Baggett (Saint Joseph's)

Assistant coach(es)

- Dino Presley (Kutztown)
- Geoff Arnold (Saint Joseph's)
- Kim Waiters (Robert Morris)

Legend

- (C) Team captain
- (S) Suspended
- (I) Ineligible
- (W) Walk-on
- Injured
- Current redshirt

Roster
Last update: November 9, 2024

== Schedule and results ==
Date time, TV	Rank^{#}	Opponent^{#}	Result	Record	Site (attendance) city, state
Exhibition
October 26, 2024*; 4:00 pm		Holy Family	W 84–79	–	Alumni Gymnasium (1,560); Lawrenceville, NJ
Regular season
November 4, 2024*; 10:30 pm, FS1		at UCLA	L 50–85	0–1	Pauley Pavilion (4,489); Los Angeles, CA
November 6, 2024*; 11:00 pm, ESPN+		at San Diego	W 68–67	1–1	Jenny Craig Pavilion; San Diego, CA
November 9, 2024*; 2:00 pm, ESPN+		at Coppin State	W 64–53	2–1	Physical Education Complex (492); Baltimore, MD
November 12, 2024*; 7:00 pm, ESPN+		at Navy	W 90–79	3–1	Alumni Hall (475); Annapolis, MD
November 19, 2024*; 8:00 pm, B1G+		at Iowa	L 58–83	3–2	Carver–Hawkeye Arena (7,851); Iowa City, IA
November 23, 2024*; 7:00 pm, ESPN+		at Bucknell	W 57–53	4–2	Sojka Pavilion (1,123); Lewisburg, PA
November 27, 2024*; 7:00 pm, FS2		at Villanova	L 48–72	4–3	Finneran Pavilion (6,501); Villanova, PA
November 30, 2024*; 2:00 pm, ESPN+		Delaware	L 66–72	4–4	Alumni Gymnasium (1,328); Lawrenceville, NJ
December 4, 2024; 7:00 pm, ESPN+		at Fairfield	L 75–78	4–5 (0–1)	Leo D. Mahoney Arena (1,578); Fairfield, CT
December 6, 2024; 7:00 pm, ESPN+		Quinnipiac	L 67–72	4–6 (0–2)	Alumni Gymnasium (1,615); Lawrenceville, NJ
December 14, 2024*; 1:00 pm, ESPN+		Stony Brook	L 55–72	4–7	Alumni Gymnasium (1,009); Lawrenceville, NJ
December 20, 2024*; 6:00 pm, ESPN+		at Penn	L 66–79	4–8	The Palestra (699); Philadelphia, PA
December 22, 2024*; 4:00 pm, ACCNX/ESPN+		at NC State	L 63–89	4–9	Lenovo Center (14,289); Raleigh, NC
January 5, 2025; 2:00 pm, ESPN+		Manhattan	L 79–80	4–10 (0–3)	Alumni Gymnasium (1,604); Lawrenceville, NJ
January 10, 2025; 7:00 pm, ESPN+		at Canisius	L 67–85	4–11 (0–4)	Koessler Athletic Center (711); Buffalo, NY
January 12, 2025; 2:00 pm, ESPN+		at Niagara	W 68–65	5–11 (1–4)	Gallagher Center (509); Lewiston, NY
January 16, 2025; 7:00 pm, ESPN+		Mount St. Mary's	W 66–60	6–11 (2–4)	Alumni Gymnasium (1,624); Lawrenceville, NJ
January 18, 2025; 7:00 pm, ESPN+		at Marist	W 64–57	7–11 (3–4)	McCann Arena (1,747); Poughkeepsie, NY
January 23, 2025; 7:00 pm, ESPN+		Iona	L 67–73	7–12 (3–5)	Alumni Gymnasium (1,118); Lawrenceville, NJ
January 25, 2025; 2:00 pm, ESPN+		at Quinnipiac	L 64–75	7–13 (3–6)	M&T Bank Arena (1,855); Hamden, CT
January 31, 2025; 7:00 pm, ESPN+		Saint Peter's	W 67–64	8–13 (4–6)	Alumni Gymnasium (1,650); Lawrenceville, NJ
February 2, 2025; 4:00 pm, ESPN+		Merrimack	L 64–66	8–14 (4–7)	Alumni Gymnasium (1,650); Lawrenceville, NJ
February 6, 2025; 7:00 pm, ESPN+		at Sacred Heart	L 77–89	8–15 (4–8)	William H. Pitt Center (723); Fairfield, CT
February 8, 2025; 7:00 pm, ESPN+		Siena	W 61–59	9–15 (5–8)	Alumni Gymnasium (1,068); Lawrenceville, NJ
February 14, 2025; 7:00 pm, ESPN+		at Iona	W 74–71	10–15 (6–8)	Hynes Athletics Center (1,468); New Rochelle, NY
February 16, 2025; 2:00 pm, ESPN+		at Saint Peter's	L 65–66	10–16 (6–9)	Run Baby Run Arena (400); Jersey City, NJ
February 21, 2025; 7:00 pm, ESPN+		Fairfield	L 49–69	10–17 (6–10)	Alumni Gymnasium (1,650); Lawrenceville, NJ
February 23, 2025; 2:00 pm, ESPN+		at Mount St. Mary's	L 72–79	10–18 (6–11)	Knott Arena (1,830); Emmitsburg, MD
February 28, 2025; 7:00 pm, ESPN+		at Merrimack	W 83–78	11–18 (7–11)	Hammel Court (1,372); North Andover, MA
March 6, 2025; 7:00 pm, ESPN+		Canisius	W 78–50	12–18 (8–11)	Alumni Gymnasium (1,514); Lawrenceville, NJ
March 8, 2025; 2:00 pm, ESPN+		Niagara	W 77–76	13–18 (9–11)	Alumni Gymnasium (1,568); Lawrenceville, NJ
MAAC tournament
March 11, 2025; 6:00 pm, ESPN+	(8)	vs. (9) Siena; First round	W 78–76	14–18	Boardwalk Hall; Atlantic City, NJ
March 12, 2025; 6:00 pm, ESPN+	(8)	vs. (1) Quinnipiac; Quarterfinals	L 64–78	14–19	Boardwalk Hall; Atlantic City, NJ
*Non-conference game. ^{#}Rankings from AP Poll. (#) Tournament seedings in parentheses. All times are in Eastern.
