= 2024–25 Quinnipiac Bobcats men's basketball team =

American college basketball season

2024–25 Quinnipiac Bobcats men's basketball
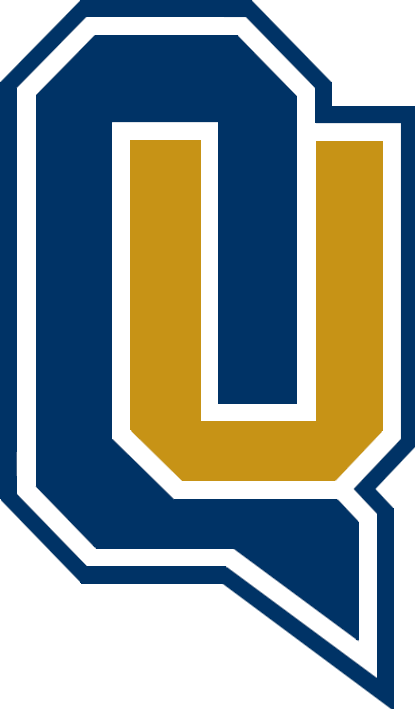

MAAC regular season champions
- Conference: Metro Atlantic Athletic Conference
- Record: 20–13 (15–5 MAAC)
- Head coach: Tom Pecora (2nd season)
- Associate head coach: Shaun Morris
- Assistant coaches: Bradley Jacks; Umar Shannon; Jeff Robinson
- Home arena: M&T Bank Arena

2024–25 MAAC men's basketball standings
	Conf.				Overall
Team	W		L	PCT	W		L	PCT
Quinnipiac	15	–	5	.750	20	–	13	.606
Merrimack	14	–	6	.700	18	–	15	.545
Marist	13	–	7	.650	20	–	10	.667
Iona	12	–	8	.600	17	–	17	.500
Manhattan	12	–	8	.600	17	–	14	.548
Mount St. Mary's †	12	–	8	.600	23	–	13	.639
Sacred Heart	10	–	10	.500	15	–	18	.455
Rider	9	–	11	.450	14	–	19	.424
Siena	9	–	11	.450	14	–	18	.438
Fairfield	8	–	12	.400	12	–	20	.375
Saint Peter's	7	–	13	.350	12	–	16	.429
Niagara	6	–	14	.300	11	–	20	.355
Canisius	3	–	17	.150	3	–	28	.097
† 2025 MAAC tournament winner

The 2024–25 Quinnipiac Bobcats men's basketball team represented Quinnipiac University during the 2024–25 NCAA Division I men's basketball season. The Bobcats, led by second-year head coach Tom Pecora, played their home games at M&T Bank Arena in Hamden, Connecticut as members of the Metro Atlantic Athletic Conference (MAAC).

== Previous season ==
The Bobcats finished the 2023–24 season 24–10, 15–5 in MAAC play, to finish as MAAC regular-season champions. They defeated Canisius, before being upset by #5 seed and eventual tournament champions Saint Peter's in the semifinals of the MAAC tournament. They received an invitation to the CBI, receiving the #6 seed, where they were defeated by Evansville in the first round.

== Roster ==
2024–25 Quinnipiac Bobcats men's basketball team
Players
Coaches

Pos.	#	Name	Height	Weight	Year	Previous school	Hometown
F	0	Alexis Reyes	6 ft 7 in (2.01 m)	195 lb (88 kg)	Sr	East Carolina	Roxbury, MA
F	1	Richie Springs	6 ft 9 in (2.06 m)	235 lb (107 kg)	GS	UConn	Brooklyn, NY
F	2	Amarri Monroe	6 ft 7 in (2.01 m)	220 lb (100 kg)	Jr	Wofford	Newburgh, NY
G	3	Savion Lewis	6 ft 1 in (1.85 m)	175 lb (79 kg)	GS	Half Hollow Hills East High School	Dix Hills, NY
G	4	Khaden Bennett	6 ft 4 in (1.93 m)	185 lb (84 kg)	So	Choate Rosemary Hall	Grand Prairie, TX
G	5	Doug Young	6 ft 0 in (1.83 m)	184 lb (83 kg)	Sr	Midland College	Houston, TX
G	7	Ryan Mabrey	6 ft 5 in (1.96 m)	195 lb (88 kg)	Jr	Miami (OH)	Belmar, NJ
F	8	Grant Randall	6 ft 9 in (2.06 m)	195 lb (88 kg)	Fr	Putnam Science Academy	Queens, NY
G	11	Samson Reilly	6 ft 2 in (1.88 m)	165 lb (75 kg)	Fr	East Catholic High School	Manchester, CT
F	12	Spence Wewe	7 ft 0 in (2.13 m)	220 lb (100 kg)	Fr	Toronto Terror Prep	Bristol, England
F	13	Braylan Ritvo	6 ft 8 in (2.03 m)	205 lb (93 kg)	Fr	Archbishop Stepinac High School	Harlem, NY
G	14	Quinn Guth	6 ft 2 in (1.88 m)	185 lb (84 kg)	Sr	Kimball Union Academy	Brookfield, CT
G	24	Jaden Zimmerman	6 ft 5 in (1.96 m)	200 lb (91 kg)	Fr	Cushing Academy	The Bronx, NY
F	33	Paul Otieno	6 ft 8 in (2.03 m)	225 lb (102 kg)	GS	Kilgore College	Nairobi, Kenya
F	34	Akintola Akinniyi	6 ft 7 in (2.01 m)	225 lb (102 kg)	So	Army	Denton, TX

Head coach

- Tom Pecora (Adelphi)

Assistant coach(es)

- Shaun Morris (Lycoming)
- Bradley Jacks (Babson)
- Umar Shannon (Quinnipiac)
- Jeff Robinson (WPI)

Legend

- (C) Team captain
- (S) Suspended
- (I) Ineligible
- (W) Walk-on
- Injured
- Current redshirt

Roster
Last update: November 9, 2024

== Schedule and results ==
Date time, TV	Rank^{#}	Opponent^{#}	Result	Record	Site (attendance) city, state
Regular season
November 4, 2024*; 8:00 p.m., ESPN+		at Yale	L 62–88	0–1	John J. Lee Amphitheater (1,104); New Haven, CT
November 7, 2024*; 7:00 p.m., ESPN+		WPI	W 71–47	1–1	M&T Bank Arena (992); Hamden, CT
November 9, 2024*; 2:00 p.m., FS2		at St. John's	L 73–96	1–2	Carnesecca Arena (5,602); Queens, NY
November 15, 2024*; 7:00 p.m., ESPN+		Maine	W 58–55	2–2	M&T Bank Arena (1,912); Hamden, CT
November 19, 2024*; 5:30 p.m., ESPN+		at Navy	W 74–63	3–2	Alumni Hall (642); Annapolis, MD
November 23, 2024*; 1:00 p.m., ESPN+		at UMass Lowell; 314 Classic	L 70–80	3–3	Costello Athletic Center (504); Lowell, MA
November 25, 2024*; 8:00 p.m., ESPN+		at Saint Louis; 314 Classic	L 67–81	3–4	Chaifetz Arena (4,225); St. Louis, MO
December 1, 2024*; 4:00 p.m., NEC Front Row		at Stonehill	L 74–88	3–5	Merkert Gymnasium (722); Easton, MA
December 6, 2024; 7:00 p.m., ESPN+		at Rider	W 72–67	4–5 (1–0)	Alumni Gymnasium (1,615); Lawrenceville, NJ
December 8, 2024; 2:00 p.m., ESPN+		Sacred Heart	W 83–73	5–5 (2–0)	M&T Bank Arena (1,167); Hamden, CT
December 17, 2024*; 7:00 p.m., ESPN+		Holy Cross	L 69–70	5–6	M&T Bank Arena (652); Hamden, CT
December 21, 2024*; 1:00 p.m., NEC Front Row		at Central Connecticut	L 80–84	5–7	William H. Detrick Gymnasium (1,144); New Britain, CT
December 29, 2024*; 1:00 p.m., ESPN+		Hofstra	W 75–69 ^{OT}	6–7	M&T Bank Arena (1,504); Hamden, CT
January 3, 2025; 7:00 p.m., ESPN+		at Saint Peter's	W 59–46	7–7 (3–0)	Run Baby Run Arena (530); Jersey City, NJ
January 5, 2025; 2:00 p.m., ESPN+		at Marist	L 62–69	7–8 (3–1)	McCann Arena (1,816); Poughkeepsie, NY
January 10, 2025; 7:00 p.m., ESPN+		Siena	W 72–53	8–8 (4–1)	M&T Bank Arena (1,187); Hamden, CT
January 12, 2025; 1:00 p.m., ESPN+		at Iona	W 63–62	9–8 (5–1)	Hynes Athletics Center (1,824); New Rochelle, NY
January 16, 2025; 7:00 p.m., ESPN+		Merrimack	W 81–76	10–8 (6–1)	M&T Bank Arena (932); Hamden, CT
January 18, 2025; 4:00 p.m., ESPN+		at Mount St. Mary's	W 91–57	11–8 (7–1)	Knott Arena (2,140); Emmitsburg, MD
January 25, 2025; 2:00 p.m., ESPN+		Rider	W 75–64	12–8 (8–1)	M&T Bank Arena (1,855); Hamden, CT
January 31, 2025; 7:00 p.m., ESPN+		Fairfield	W 81–69	13–8 (9–1)	M&T Bank Arena (2,812); Hamden, CT
February 2, 2025; 2:00 p.m., ESPN+		at Siena	L 75–84	13–9 (9–2)	MVP Arena (6,469); Albany, NY
February 6, 2025; 7:00 p.m., ESPN+		Canisius	W 89–71	14–9 (10–2)	M&T Bank Arena (852); Hamden, CT
February 8, 2025; 2:00 p.m., ESPN+		Niagara	L 75–76	14–10 (10–3)	M&T Bank Arena (1,714); Hamden, CT
February 14, 2025; 1:00 p.m., ESPN+		at Sacred Heart	W 99–90	15–10 (11–3)	William H. Pitt Center (1,196); Fairfield, CT
February 16, 2025; 2:00 p.m., ESPN+		Iona	W 79–74	16–10 (12–3)	M&T Bank Arena (1,643); Hamden, CT
February 23, 2025; 2:00 p.m., ESPN+		at Manhattan	W 74–71	17–10 (13–3)	Draddy Gymnasium; Riverdale, NY
February 28, 2025; 7:00 p.m., ESPN+/ESPNU		Saint Peter's	W 69–64	18–10 (14–3)	M&T Bank Arena (2,802); Hamden, CT
March 2, 2025; 2:00 p.m., ESPN+		at Merrimack	L 63–73	18–11 (14–4)	Hammel Court (1,783); North Andover, MA
March 6, 2025; 7:00 p.m., ESPN+		Mount St. Mary's	W 79–70	19–11 (15–4)	M&T Bank Arena (1,109); Hamden, CT
March 8, 2025; 7:00 p.m., ESPN+		at Fairfield	L 74–83	19–12 (15–5)	Leo D. Mahoney Arena (2,903); Fairfield, CT
MAAC tournament
March 12, 2025; 6:00 p.m., ESPN+	(1)	vs. (8) Rider; Quarterfinals	W 78–64	20–12	Boardwalk Hall; Atlantic City, NJ
March 14, 2025; 6:00 p.m., ESPNews	(1)	vs. (4) Iona; Semifinals	L 73–81	20–13	Boardwalk Hall; Atlantic City, NJ
*Non-conference game. ^{#}Rankings from AP poll. (#) Tournament seedings in parentheses. All times are in Eastern.
