= 2024–25 Saint Peter's Peacocks men's basketball team =

American college basketball season

2024–25 Saint Peter's Peacocks men's basketball
- Conference: Metro Atlantic Athletic Conference
- Record: 12–16 (7–13 MAAC)
- Head coach: Bashir Mason (3rd season)
- Assistant coaches: Pete Cipriano; Keydren Clark; Scott Rodgers; Vince Johnson; Aaron Brown
- Home arena: Run Baby Run Arena

2024–25 MAAC men's basketball standings
	Conf.				Overall
Team	W		L	PCT	W		L	PCT
Quinnipiac	15	–	5	.750	20	–	13	.606
Merrimack	14	–	6	.700	18	–	15	.545
Marist	13	–	7	.650	20	–	10	.667
Iona	12	–	8	.600	17	–	17	.500
Manhattan	12	–	8	.600	17	–	14	.548
Mount St. Mary's †	12	–	8	.600	23	–	13	.639
Sacred Heart	10	–	10	.500	15	–	18	.455
Rider	9	–	11	.450	14	–	19	.424
Siena	9	–	11	.450	14	–	18	.438
Fairfield	8	–	12	.400	12	–	20	.375
Saint Peter's	7	–	13	.350	12	–	16	.429
Niagara	6	–	14	.300	11	–	20	.355
Canisius	3	–	17	.150	3	–	28	.097
† 2025 MAAC tournament winner

The 2024–25 Saint Peter's Peacocks men's basketball team represented Saint Peter's University during the 2024–25 NCAA Division I men's basketball season. The Peacocks, led by third-year head coach Bashir Mason, played their home games at the Run Baby Run Arena in Jersey City, New Jersey, as members of the Metro Atlantic Athletic Conference.

== Previous season ==
The Peacocks finished the 2023–24 season 19–14, 12–8 in MAAC play to finish in a tie for third place. They defeated Rider, Quinnipiac, and Fairfield to win the MAAC tournament championship, and as a result, they received the conference's automatic bid to the NCAA tournament for the fifth time in school history, and second time in three years. They received the #15 seed in the Midwest Region, where they would fall to the #2 region seed Tennessee in the First Round.

== Roster ==
2024–25 Saint Peter's Peacocks men's basketball team
Players
Coaches

Pos.	#	Name	Height	Weight	Year	Previous school	Hometown
G	0	Eric Morgan Jr.	6 ft 4 in (1.93 m)	180 lb (82 kg)	Jr	District of Columbia	Washington, D.C.
G	1	Brent Bland	6 ft 3 in (1.91 m)	205 lb (93 kg)	RS Jr	Half Hollow Hills West HS	Wheatley Heights, NY
G	2	Marcus Randolph	6 ft 5 in (1.96 m)	205 lb (93 kg)	Sr	Richmond	Willingboro, NJ
G	4	Adetokunbo Bakare	6 ft 3 in (1.91 m)	190 lb (86 kg)	Sr	Rider	Newark, NJ
G	5	Armoni Zeigler	6 ft 4 in (1.93 m)	185 lb (84 kg)	So	Our Saviour Lutheran School	Amityville, NY
G	7	Elijah Perkins	6 ft 4 in (1.93 m)	195 lb (88 kg)	Jr	Austin Peay	Middletown, NJ
G	8	Bryce Eaton	6 ft 0 in (1.83 m)	180 lb (82 kg)	RS Fr	Central Michigan	Detroit, MI
G	10	Tyreck Morris	6 ft 5 in (1.96 m)	170 lb (77 kg)	Jr	Indian Hills CC	Jamaica, NY
F	11	Zaakir Williamson	6 ft 7 in (2.01 m)	230 lb (104 kg)	Jr	Buffalo	Philadelphia, PA
G	12	Jakai Sanders	6 ft 3 in (1.91 m)	195 lb (88 kg)	Fr	Eagle Academy	Brooklyn, NY
F	15	Stephon Roberts	6 ft 10 in (2.08 m)	230 lb (104 kg)	GS	Virginia State	Brooklyn, NY
F/C	21	Jaquel Morris	6 ft 8 in (2.03 m)	225 lb (102 kg)	Jr	Eagle Academy	Brooklyn, NY
F	35	Mouhamed Sow	6 ft 9 in (2.06 m)	205 lb (93 kg)	RS Jr	The Patrick School	Dakar, Senegal

Head coach

- Bashir Mason (Drexel)

Assistant coach(es)

- Pete Cipriano (Southern)
- Keydren Clark (Saint Peter's)
- Scott Rodgers (Drexel)
- Vince Johnson (St. Thomas Aquinas)
- Aaron Brown (Southern Miss)

Legend

- (C) Team captain
- (S) Suspended
- (I) Ineligible
- (W) Walk-on
- Injured
- Current redshirt

Roster
Last update: November 12, 2024

== Schedule and results ==
Date time, TV	Rank^{#}	Opponent^{#}	Result	Record	High points	High rebounds	High assists	Site (attendance) city, state
Regular season
November 4, 2024*; 7:30 pm, FS1		at Seton Hall	L 53–57	0–1	12 – Eaton	11 – Zeigler	3 – Eaton	Prudential Center (8,072); Newark, NJ
November 8, 2024*; 6:00 pm, ESPN+		at UMass Lowell	L 74–81	0–2	16 – Randolph	11 – Roberts	3 – Tied	Costello Athletic Center (601); Lowell, MA
November 11, 2024*; 7:00 pm, B1G+		at No. 24 Rutgers	L 65–75	0–3	22 – Randolph	6 – Tied	5 – T. Morris	Jersey Mike's Arena (8,000); Piscataway, NJ
November 16, 2024*; 2:00 pm, ESPN+		at UMBC	W 69–61	1–3	19 – Randolph	8 – Tied	3 – Sanders	Chesapeake Employers Insurance Arena (1,335); Catonsville, MD
November 20, 2024*; 7:00 pm, ESPN+		Saint Elizabeth	W 116–51	2–3	30 – Zeigler	17 – Roberts	5 – Tied	Run Baby Run Arena (810); Jersey City, NJ
November 26, 2024*; 7:00 pm, YES		at Fairleigh Dickinson	W 78–76	3–3	21 – Eaton	9 – Roberts	4 – Eaton	Bogota Savings Bank Center (1,056); Hackensack, NJ
December 3, 2024*; 7:00 pm, ESPN+		at Duquesne	W 62–59	4–3	11 – Tied	9 – Tied	3 – Sow	UPMC Cooper Fieldhouse (2,118); Pittsburgh, PA
December 6, 2024; 7:00 pm, ESPN+		Manhattan	L 67–70	4–4 (0–1)	18 – Zeigler	8 – Zeigler	4 – Randolph	Run Baby Run Arena (688); Jersey City, NJ
December 8, 2024; 1:00 pm, ESPN+		at Iona	L 63–72	4–5 (0–2)	29 – Randolph	6 – Zeigler	2 – Tied	Hynes Athletics Center (1,610); New Rochelle, NY
December 20, 2024*; 7:00 pm, ESPN+		Delaware	W 72–64	5–5	25 – Sow	13 – Zeigler	4 – Tied	Run Baby Run Arena (495); Jersey City, NJ
January 3, 2025; 7:00 pm, ESPN+		Quinnipiac	L 46–59	5–6 (0–3)	10 – Eaton	7 – Roberts	2 – Tied	Run Baby Run Arena (530); Jersey City, NJ
January 10, 2025; 6:30 pm, ESPN+		at Niagara	L 60–70	5–7 (0–4)	13 – Zeigler	7 – Zeigler	3 – Zeigler	Gallagher Center (708); Lewiston, NY
January 12, 2025; 1:00 pm, ESPN+		at Canisius	W 62–49	6–7 (1–4)	19 – Randolph	13 – Roberts	5 – Eaton	Koessler Athletic Center (457); Buffalo, NY
January 16, 2025; 7:00 pm, ESPN+		Marist	L 51–56	6–8 (1–5)	14 – Zeigler	9 – Zeigler	4 – Eaton	Run Baby Run Arena (300); Jersey City, NJ
January 18, 2025; 2:00 pm, ESPN+		at Sacred Heart	W 66–61	7–8 (2–5)	18 – Randolph	6 – Randolph	3 – Eaton	William H. Pitt Center (698); Fairfield, CT
January 23, 2025; 7:00 pm, ESPN+		Merrimack	L 37–48	7–9 (2–6)	8 – Tied	13 – Morris	3 – Randolph	Run Baby Run Arena (621); Jersey City, NJ
January 31, 2025; 7:00 pm, ESPN+		at Rider	L 64–67	7–10 (2–7)	13 – Tied	8 – Zeigler	4 – Eaton	Alumni Gymnasium (1,650); Lawrenceville, NJ
February 2, 2025; 2:00 pm, ESPN+		Mount St. Mary's	L 64–79	7–11 (2–8)	18 – Randolph	5 – Tied	3 – Tied	Run Baby Run Arena (679); Jersey City, NJ
February 6, 2025; 7:00 pm, ESPN+		at Siena	L 63–77	7–12 (2–9)	19 – Randolph	6 – Williamson	1 – Tied	MVP Arena (4,852); Albany, NY
February 8, 2025; 2:00 pm, ESPN+		at Manhattan	L 83–84 ^{OT}	7–13 (2–10)	24 – Randolph	9 – Tied	5 – Eaton	Draddy Gymnasium (620); Riverdale, NY
February 14, 2025; 7:00 pm, ESPN+		Fairfield	W 65–52	8–13 (3–10)	14 – Zeigler	10 – Roberts	2 – Roberts	Run Baby Run Arena (442); Jersey City, NJ
February 16, 2025; 2:00 pm, ESPN+		Rider	W 66–65	9–13 (4–10)	16 – Eaton	11 – Sow	3 – Tied	Run Baby Run Arena (400); Jersey City, NJ
February 21, 2025; 7:00 pm, ESPN+		at Mount St. Mary's	L 58–69	9–14 (4–11)	17 – Randolph	15 – Sow	2 – Tied	Knott Arena (2,265); Emmitsburg, MD
February 23, 2025; 2:00 pm, ESPN+		Sacred Heart	W 85–79	10–14 (5–11)	27 – Eaton	13 – Zeigler	5 – Randolph	Run Baby Run Arena (621); Jersey City, NJ
February 28, 2025; 7:00 pm, ESPN+		at Quinnipiac	L 64–69	10–15 (5–12)	13 – Tied	7 – Zeigler	5 – Morris	M&T Bank Arena (2,802); Hamden, CT
March 2, 2025; 2:00 pm, ESPN+		at Marist	W 57–52	11–15 (6–12)	15 – Randolph	13 – Roberts	3 – Zeigler	McCann Arena (2,737); Poughkeepsie, NY
March 6, 2025; 7:00 pm, ESPN+		Niagara	L 68–78 ^{OT}	11–16 (6–13)	19 – Sow	9 – Tied	2 – Tied	Run Baby Run Arena (373); Jersey City, NJ
March 8, 2025; 2:00 pm, ESPN+		Canisius	W 70–62	12–16 (7–13)	21 – Randolph	10 – Sow	3 – Tied	Run Baby Run Arena (503); Jersey City, NJ
*Non-conference game. ^{#}Rankings from AP Poll. (#) Tournament seedings in parentheses. All times are in Eastern.
