= 2024–25 Sacred Heart Pioneers men's basketball team =

American college basketball season

2024–25 Sacred Heart Pioneers men's basketball
- Conference: Metro Atlantic Athletic Conference
- Record: 15–18 (10–10 MAAC)
- Head coach: Anthony Latina (12th season)
- Associate head coach: Kyle Steinway
- Assistant coaches: Tom Barrett; Donte Gittens; Jeremy Kipness
- Home arena: William H. Pitt Center

2024–25 MAAC men's basketball standings
	Conf.				Overall
Team	W		L	PCT	W		L	PCT
Quinnipiac	15	–	5	.750	20	–	13	.606
Merrimack	14	–	6	.700	18	–	15	.545
Marist	13	–	7	.650	20	–	10	.667
Iona	12	–	8	.600	17	–	17	.500
Manhattan	12	–	8	.600	17	–	14	.548
Mount St. Mary's †	12	–	8	.600	23	–	13	.639
Sacred Heart	10	–	10	.500	15	–	18	.455
Rider	9	–	11	.450	14	–	19	.424
Siena	9	–	11	.450	14	–	18	.438
Fairfield	8	–	12	.400	12	–	20	.375
Saint Peter's	7	–	13	.350	12	–	16	.429
Niagara	6	–	14	.300	11	–	20	.355
Canisius	3	–	17	.150	3	–	28	.097
† 2025 MAAC tournament winner

The 2024–25 Sacred Heart Pioneers men's basketball team represented Sacred Heart University during the 2024–25 NCAA Division I men's basketball season. The Pioneers, led by 12th-year head coach Anthony Latina, played their home games at the William H. Pitt Center in Fairfield, Connecticut as first-year members of the Metro Atlantic Athletic Conference.

== Previous season ==
The Pioneers finished the 2023–24 season 16–16, 10–6 in NEC play to finish in third place. They were upset by #6 seed and eventual tournament champions Wagner in the quarterfinals of the NEC tournament.

This would be the last season for Sacred Heart as members of the Northeast Conference, as they joined the Metro Atlantic Athletic Conference for the 2024–25 season.

== Roster ==
2024–25 Sacred Heart Pioneers men's basketball team
Players
Coaches

Pos.	#	Name	Height	Weight	Year	Previous school	Hometown
G/F	0	Keyishon Miller	6 ft 5 in (1.96 m)	175 lb (79 kg)	Jr	Northwest Kansas Tech	Philadelphia, PA
G	1	Griffin Barrouk	6 ft 5 in (1.96 m)	200 lb (91 kg)	Jr	Hofstra	Glen Mills, PA
G	2	Nyle Ralph-Beyer	6 ft 4 in (1.93 m)	175 lb (79 kg)	Fr	Henderson High School	West Chester, PA
G	3	Mekhi Conner	6 ft 1 in (1.85 m)	183 lb (83 kg)	Fr	Notre Dame High School	New Haven, CT
G	4	Jaden Slaughter	6 ft 5 in (1.96 m)	205 lb (93 kg)	RS So	St. Joseph's Collegiate Institute	Buffalo, NY
G	5	Amiri Stewart	6 ft 3 in (1.91 m)	191 lb (87 kg)	Sr	Wilmington	Boothwyn, PA
F	7	Anquan Hill	6 ft 9 in (2.06 m)	200 lb (91 kg)	RS Jr	St. Bonaventure	Philadelphia, PA
G	10	Taj Bryant	6 ft 2 in (1.88 m)	178 lb (81 kg)	Fr	The Patrick School	Queens, NY
G	11	Malik Sheppard	5 ft 10 in (1.78 m)	155 lb (70 kg)	Fr	Don Bosco Prep	Edgewater, NJ
G	13	Fallou Gueye	6 ft 6 in (1.98 m)	187 lb (85 kg)	Fr	Putnam Science Academy	Raleigh, NC
F	15	Raymond Espinal-Guzman	6 ft 8 in (2.03 m)	220 lb (100 kg)	RS Jr	Woodstock Academy	Cranston, RI
F	21	Bryce Johnson	6 ft 6 in (1.98 m)	220 lb (100 kg)	GS	Northeastern	Stockton, CA
F	23	Lucius Gibson-Savadel	6 ft 11 in (2.11 m)	240 lb (109 kg)	RS Fr	Millbrook School	Bay Shore, NY
F	25	Tanner Thomas	6 ft 6 in (1.98 m)	215 lb (98 kg)	RS Jr	Williston Northampton School	Stamford, CT
C	33	Alex Woodring	6 ft 10 in (2.08 m)	—	Fr	Compass Prep	Wyckoff, NJ
G	35	Aidan Carpenter	6 ft 4 in (1.93 m)	205 lb (93 kg)	RS Jr	Siena	Hamden, CT

Head coach

- Anthony Latina (Brandeis)

Assistant coach(es)

- Kyle Steinway (Providence)
- Tom Barrett (Temple)
- Donte Gittens (Franklin Pierce)
- Jeremy Kipness (Louisville)

Legend

- (C) Team captain
- (S) Suspended
- (I) Ineligible
- (W) Walk-on
- Injured
- Current redshirt

Roster
Last update: November 12, 2024

== Schedule and results ==
Date time, TV	Rank^{#}	Opponent^{#}	Result	Record	Site (attendance) city, state
Regular season
November 4, 2024*; 5:30 pm, ESPN+		at Temple	L 70–81	0–1	Liacouras Center (3,485); Philadelphia, PA
November 6, 2024*; 5:30 pm, FS1		at No. 3 UConn	L 56–92	0–2	Gampel Pavilion (10,299); Storrs, CT
November 9, 2024*; 1:00 pm, ESPN+		at Dartmouth	L 76–81	0–3	Leede Arena (802); Hanover, NH
November 15, 2024*; 4:30 pm, ESPN+		vs. Holy Cross; College Hill Classic	L 75–82	0–4	Pizzitola Sports Center (259); Providence, RI
November 16, 2024*; 4:30 pm, ESPN+		vs. New Hampshire; College Hill Classic	W 80–63	1–4	Pizzitola Sports Center (279); Providence, RI
November 17, 2024*; 6:00 pm, ESPN+		at Brown; College Hill Classic	L 70–89	1–5	Pizzitola Sports Center (518); Providence, RI
November 21, 2024*; 8:00 pm, ESPN+		Central Connecticut	W 67–54	2–5	William H. Pitt Center (1,945); Fairfield, CT
December 1, 2024*; 4:00 pm, ESPN+		at Boston University	W 73–65	3–5	Case Gym (981); Boston, MA
December 6, 2024; 7:00 pm, ESPN+		Iona	W 83–59	4–5 (1–0)	William H. Pitt Center (1,126); Fairfield, CT
December 8, 2024; 2:00 pm, ESPN+		at Quinnipiac	L 73–83	4–6 (1–1)	M&T Bank Arena (1,167); Hamden, CT
December 18, 2024*; 11:00 am, ESPN+		Albany	L 66–74	4–7	William H. Pitt Center (1,800); Fairfield, CT
December 22, 2024*; 1:00 pm, ESPN+		at Miami (OH)	L 76–94	4–8	Millett Hall (896); Oxford, OH
December 29, 2024*; 2:00 pm, ESPN+		Manhattanville	W 100–60	5–8	William H. Pitt Center (831); Fairfield, CT
January 5, 2025; 2:00 pm, ESPN+		Canisius	W 99–82	6–8 (2–1)	William H. Pitt Center (682); Fairfield, CT
January 10, 2025; 11:00 am, ESPN+		Merrimack	L 65–66	6–9 (2–2)	William H. Pitt Center (1,200); Fairfield, CT
January 12, 2025; 2:00 pm, ESPN+		at Mount St. Mary's	L 71–73	6–10 (2–3)	Knott Arena (1,980); Emmitsburg, MD
January 16, 2025; 7:00 pm, ESPN+		at Siena	L 75–93	6–11 (2–4)	MVP Arena (4,362); Albany, NY
January 18, 2025; 2:00 pm, ESPN+		Saint Peter's	L 61–66	6–12 (2–5)	William H. Pitt Center (698); Fairfield, CT
January 23, 2025; 7:00 pm, ESPN+		at Canisius	W 93–84	7–12 (3–5)	Koessler Athletic Center (533); Buffalo, NY
January 25, 2025; 2:00 pm, ESPN+		at Niagara	W 86–77	8–12 (4–5)	Gallagher Center (813); Lewiston, NY
February 2, 2025; 2:00 pm, ESPN+		Manhattan	W 74–72	9–12 (5–5)	William H. Pitt Center (1,079); Fairfield, CT
February 6, 2025; 7:00 pm, ESPN+		Rider	W 89–77	10–12 (6–5)	William H. Pitt Center (723); Fairfield, CT
February 8, 2025; 7:00 pm, ESPN+		at Fairfield	W 77–71	11–12 (7–5)	Leo D. Mahoney Arena (3,470); Fairfield, CT
February 14, 2025; 7:00 pm, ESPN+		Quinnipiac	L 90–99	11–13 (7–6)	William H. Pitt Center (1,196); Fairfield, CT
February 16, 2025; 12:00 pm, ESPN+		Siena	L 73–80	11–14 (7–7)	William H. Pitt Center (1,633); Fairfield, CT
February 21, 2025; 7:00 pm, ESPN+		at Merrimack	W 60–59	12–14 (8–7)	Hammel Court (1,417); North Andover, MA
February 23, 2025; 2:00 pm, ESPN+		at Saint Peter's	L 79–85	12–15 (8–8)	Run Baby Run Arena (621); Jersey City, NJ
February 28, 2025; 7:00 pm, ESPN+		Marist	W 67–54	13–15 (9–8)	William H. Pitt Center (1,052); Fairfield, CT
March 2, 2025; 2:00 pm, ESPN+		Fairfield	W 83–62	14–15 (10–8)	William H. Pitt Center (1,749); Fairfield, CT
March 6, 2025; 7:00 pm, ESPN+		at Manhattan	L 74–90	14–16 (10–9)	Draddy Gymnasium (1,057); Riverdale, NY
March 8, 2025; 4:00 pm, ESPN+		at Iona	L 88–90	14–17 (10–10)	Hynes Athletics Center (2,157); New Rochelle, NY
MAAC tournament
March 11, 2025; 8:30 pm, ESPN+	(7)	vs. (10) Fairfield; First round	W 71–58	15–17	Boardwalk Hall (1,928); Atlantic City, NJ
March 12, 2025; 8:30 pm, ESPN+	(7)	vs. (2) Merrimack; Quarterfinals	L 62–66 ^{OT}	15–18	Boardwalk Hall (1,707); Atlantic City, NJ
*Non-conference game. ^{#}Rankings from AP Poll. (#) Tournament seedings in parentheses. All times are in Eastern.
