= 2024–25 Marist Red Foxes men's basketball team =

American college basketball season

2024–25 Marist Red Foxes men's basketball
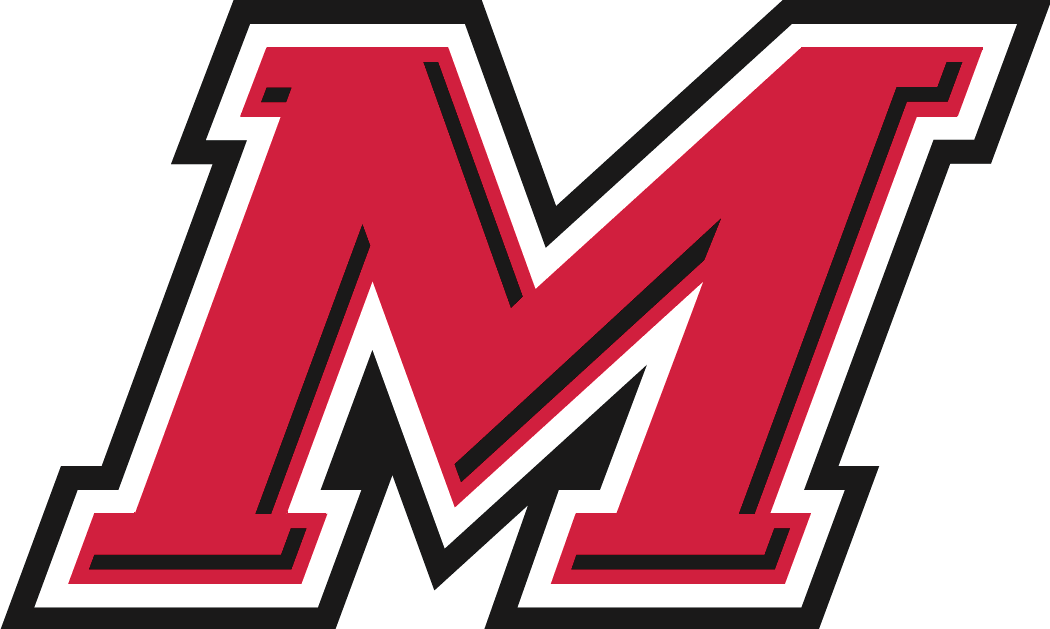
- Conference: Metro Atlantic Athletic Conference
- Record: 20–10 (13–7 MAAC)
- Head coach: John Dunne (7th season)
- Associate head coach: Dalip Bhatia
- Assistant coaches: Drew Metz; Brandon Hall; Dan Bozzelli
- Home arena: McCann Arena

2024–25 MAAC men's basketball standings
	Conf.				Overall
Team	W		L	PCT	W		L	PCT
Quinnipiac	15	–	5	.750	20	–	13	.606
Merrimack	14	–	6	.700	18	–	15	.545
Marist	13	–	7	.650	20	–	10	.667
Iona	12	–	8	.600	17	–	17	.500
Manhattan	12	–	8	.600	17	–	14	.548
Mount St. Mary's †	12	–	8	.600	23	–	13	.639
Sacred Heart	10	–	10	.500	15	–	18	.455
Rider	9	–	11	.450	14	–	19	.424
Siena	9	–	11	.450	14	–	18	.438
Fairfield	8	–	12	.400	12	–	20	.375
Saint Peter's	7	–	13	.350	12	–	16	.429
Niagara	6	–	14	.300	11	–	20	.355
Canisius	3	–	17	.150	3	–	28	.097
† 2025 MAAC tournament winner

The 2024–25 Marist Red Foxes men's basketball team represented Marist College during the 2024–25 NCAA Division I men's basketball season. The Red Foxes, led by seventh-year head coach John Dunne, played their home games at the McCann Arena in Poughkeepsie, New York as members of the Metro Atlantic Athletic Conference (MAAC).

== Previous season ==
The Red Foxes finished the 2023–24 season 18–13, 12–8 in MAAC play, to finish in a three-way tie for third place. They defeated Niagara before falling to Fairfield in the semifinals of the MAAC tournament.

== Roster ==
2024–25 Marist Red Foxes men's basketball team
Players
Coaches

Pos.	#	Name	Height	Weight	Year	Previous school	Hometown
G	0	Jadin Collins-Roberts	6 ft 1 in (1.85 m)	175 lb (79 kg)	So	Rutgers Prep	Edison, NJ
C	1	Jason Schofield	6 ft 9 in (2.06 m)	235 lb (107 kg)	RS Fr	South Kent School	Poughkeepsie, NY
G	2	Caleb Mackrey	6 ft 3 in (1.91 m)	180 lb (82 kg)	Jr	Hillsborough Community College	Lake Worth, FL
F	4	Travis Roberts	6 ft 6 in (1.98 m)	205 lb (93 kg)	Jr	Jacksonville State	Waldorf, MD
G	5	Josh Pascarelli	6 ft 3 in (1.91 m)	195 lb (88 kg)	So	St. Francis Prep	Cambria Heights, NY
G	7	Martin Kawa	6 ft 4 in (1.93 m)	185 lb (84 kg)	Jr	Richard Bland College	Stafford, VA
F	10	Trace Salton	6 ft 5 in (1.96 m)	195 lb (88 kg)	Jr	Bridgton Academy	Lake Oswego, OR
F	11	Jaden Daughtry	6 ft 7 in (2.01 m)	200 lb (91 kg)	Jr	St. Francis Prep	Queens, NY
G	13	Elijah Lewis	6 ft 5 in (1.96 m)	170 lb (77 kg)	Jr	Adelphi	Watchung, NJ
F	15	Parby Kabamba	6 ft 6 in (1.98 m)	225 lb (102 kg)	Fr	South Kent School	Kinshasa, DR Congo
F	21	Matt McCool	6 ft 8 in (2.03 m)	230 lb (104 kg)	Jr	South Kent School	Amherst, NH
C	24	Jackson Price	6 ft 8 in (2.03 m)	235 lb (107 kg)	Sr	The Citadel	Hiram, GA
C	25	Tarik Watson	6 ft 8 in (2.03 m)	225 lb (102 kg)	Fr	Hillcrest Prep	Middletown, NY
G	31	Antoni Vlogianitis	6 ft 4 in (1.93 m)	185 lb (84 kg)	Fr	Avon Old Farms	Garden City, NY
G	32	Jagger Bascombe	6 ft 2 in (1.88 m)	190 lb (86 kg)	Fr	St. Mary's High School	Franklin Square, NY

Head coach

- John Dunne (Ithaca)

Assistant coach(es)

- Dalip Bhatia (Rutgers)
- Drew Metz (St. John's)
- Brandon Hall (Saint Peter's)
- Dan Bozzelli (SUNY Cortland)

Legend

- (C) Team captain
- (S) Suspended
- (I) Ineligible
- (W) Walk-on
- Injured
- Current redshirt

Roster
Last update: November 10, 2024

== Schedule and results ==
Date time, TV	Rank^{#}	Opponent^{#}	Result	Record	High points	High rebounds	High assists	Site (attendance) city, state
Regular season
November 4, 2024*; 5:00 p.m., ESPN+		at Harvard	L 66–79	0–1	24 – Pascarelli	6 – Kabamba	3 – 2 tied	Lavietes Pavilion (919); Cambridge, MA
November 9, 2024*; 6:00 p.m., ESPN+		at Richmond	W 79–72	1–1	22 – Pascarelli	8 – Daughtry	5 – Price	Robins Center (5,038); Richmond, VA
November 15, 2024*; 7:00 p.m., ESPN+		Army	W 91–88 ^{OT}	2–1	25 – Pascarelli	5 – 3 tied	7 – Collins-Roberts	McCann Arena (2,249); Poughkeepsie, NY
November 19, 2024*; 7:00 p.m., ESPN+		Dartmouth	W 75–62	3–1	13 – Collins-Roberts	9 – Collins-Roberts	5 – Collins-Roberts	McCann Arena (1,464); Poughkeepsie, NY
November 23, 2024*; 2:00 p.m., ESPN+		New Hampshire	W 54–49	4–1	14 – 2 tied	7 – Price	4 – Collins-Roberts	McCann Arena (1,659); Poughkeepsie, NY
November 30, 2024*; 7:00 p.m., ESPN+		at Lehigh	L 69–74	4–2	14 – Price	9 – Kabamba	3 – Collins-Roberts	Stabler Arena (648); Bethlehem, PA
December 6, 2024; 7:00 p.m., ESPN+		Mount St. Mary's	W 53–50	5–2 (1–0)	13 – Pascarelli	8 – Daughtry	3 – Price	McCann Arena (1,596); Poughkeepsie, NY
December 8, 2024; 2:00 p.m., ESPN+		at Manhattan	W 82–75	6–2 (2–0)	24 – Pascarelli	8 – Lewis	4 – 2 tied	Draddy Gymnasium (156); Riverdale, NY
December 17, 2024*; 7:00 p.m., FloHoops		at Stony Brook	W 68–66	7–2	16 – Lewis	8 – Daughtry	7 – Schofield	Island Federal Arena (1,699); Stony Brook, NY
December 21, 2024*; 1:00 p.m., ESPN+		UMBC	W 76–73 ^{OT}	8–2	17 – Lewis	16 – Daughtry	5 – Daughtry	McCann Arena (867); Poughkeepsie, NY
December 29, 2024*; 2:00 p.m., ESPN+		Binghamton	W 69–51	9–2	21 – Lewis	8 – Daughtry	6 – Lewis	McCann Arena (2,059); Poughkeepsie, NY
January 3, 2025; 7:00 p.m., ESPN+		at Iona	W 70–65	10–2 (3–0)	16 – Pascarelli	6 – Daughtry	5 – Collins-Roberts	Hynes Athletics Center (1,702); New Rochelle, NY
January 5, 2025; 2:00 p.m., ESPN+		Quinnipiac	W 69–62	11–2 (4–0)	20 – Pascarelli	8 – Pascarelli	4 – 2 tied	McCann Arena (1,816); Poughkeepsie, NY
January 12, 2025; 2:00 p.m., ESPN+		Fairfield	W 61–51	12–2 (5–0)	12 – Price	7 – Collins-Roberts	4 – 2 tied	McCann Arena (1,669); Poughkeepsie, NY
January 16, 2025; 7:00 p.m., ESPN+		at Saint Peter's	W 56–51	13–2 (6–0)	16 – Price	6 – Collins-Roberts	4 – Daughtry	Run Baby Run Arena (300); Jersey City, NJ
January 18, 2025; 7:00 p.m., ESPN+		Rider	L 57–64	13–3 (6–1)	21 – Burton	15 – Alvarez	1 – 3 tied	McCann Arena (1,747); Poughkeepsie, NY
January 23, 2025; 6:30 p.m., ESPN+		at Niagara	W 67–65 ^{OT}	14–3 (7–1)	12 – 2 tied	6 – Daughtry	11 – Collins-Roberts	Gallagher Center (917); Lewiston, NY
January 25, 2025; 1:00 p.m., ESPN+		at Canisius	W 70–47	15–3 (8–1)	15 – Pascarelli	7 – Lewis	4 – 2 tied	Koessler Athletic Center (837); Buffalo, NY
January 31, 2025; 7:00 p.m., ESPN+		Siena	W 72–67	16–3 (9–1)	19 – Lewis	10 – Daughtry	3 – 4 tied	McCann Arena (3,200); Poughkeepsie, NY
February 6, 2025; 7:00 p.m., ESPN+		at Fairfield	L 56–59	16–4 (9–2)	15 – Pascarelli	8 – Collins-Roberts	4 – Lewis	Leo D. Mahoney Arena (1,868); Fairfield, CT
February 8, 2025; 7:00 p.m., ESPN+		Iona	L 71–75	16–5 (9–3)	16 – Watson	4 – 2 tied	6 – Collins-Roberts	McCann Arena (3,037); Poughkeepsie, NY
February 14, 2025; 7:00 p.m., ESPN+		at Siena	W 65–64	17–5 (10–3)	14 – Lewis	13 – Daughtry	4 – Collins-Roberts	MVP Arena (4,950); Albany, NY
February 16, 2025; 2:00 p.m., ESPN+		at Merrimack	W 61–60	18–5 (11–3)	13 – Lewis	9 – 2 tied	7 – Collins-Roberts	Hammel Court (1,576); North Andover, MA
February 21, 2025; 7:00 p.m., ESPN+		Canisius	W 89–81	19–5 (12–3)	31 – Pascarelli	10 – Schofield	5 – Collins-Roberts	McCann Arena (2,253); Poughkeepsie, NY
February 23, 2025; 2:00 p.m., ESPN+		Niagara	W 64–61	20–5 (13–3)	22 – Pascarelli	10 – Collins-Roberts	4 – Daughtry	McCann Arena (2,444); Poughkeepsie, NY
February 28, 2025; 7:00 p.m., ESPN+		at Sacred Heart	L 54–67	20–6 (13–4)	18 – Pascarelli	7 – 2 tied	3 – Watson	William H. Pitt Center (1,052); Fairfield, CT
March 2, 2025; 2:00 p.m., ESPN+		Saint Peter's	L 52–57	20–7 (13–5)	12 – Watson	8 – Collins-Roberts	4 – Pascarelli	McCann Arena (2,737); Poughkeepsie, NY
March 6, 2025; 7:00 p.m., ESPN+		Merrimack	L 53–75	20–8 (13–6)	17 – Schofield	6 – Lewis	3 – 2 tied	McCann Arena (1,575); Poughkeepsie, NY
March 8, 2025; 4:00 p.m., ESPN+		at Mount St. Mary's	L 52–62	20–9 (13–7)	13 – Price	7 – Lewis	4 – 2 tied	Knott Arena (2,694); Emmitsburg, MD
MAAC tournament
March 13, 2025; 8:30 p.m., ESPN+	(3)	vs. (6) Mount St. Mary's; Quarterfinals	L 58–62	20–10	16 – Pascarelli	9 – Daughtry	4 – Collins-Roberts	Boardwalk Hall (1,794); Atlantic City, NJ
*Non-conference game. ^{#}Rankings from AP poll. (#) Tournament seedings in parentheses. All times are in Eastern.
