= 2024–25 Iona Gaels men's basketball team =

American college basketball season

2024–25 Iona Gaels men's basketball
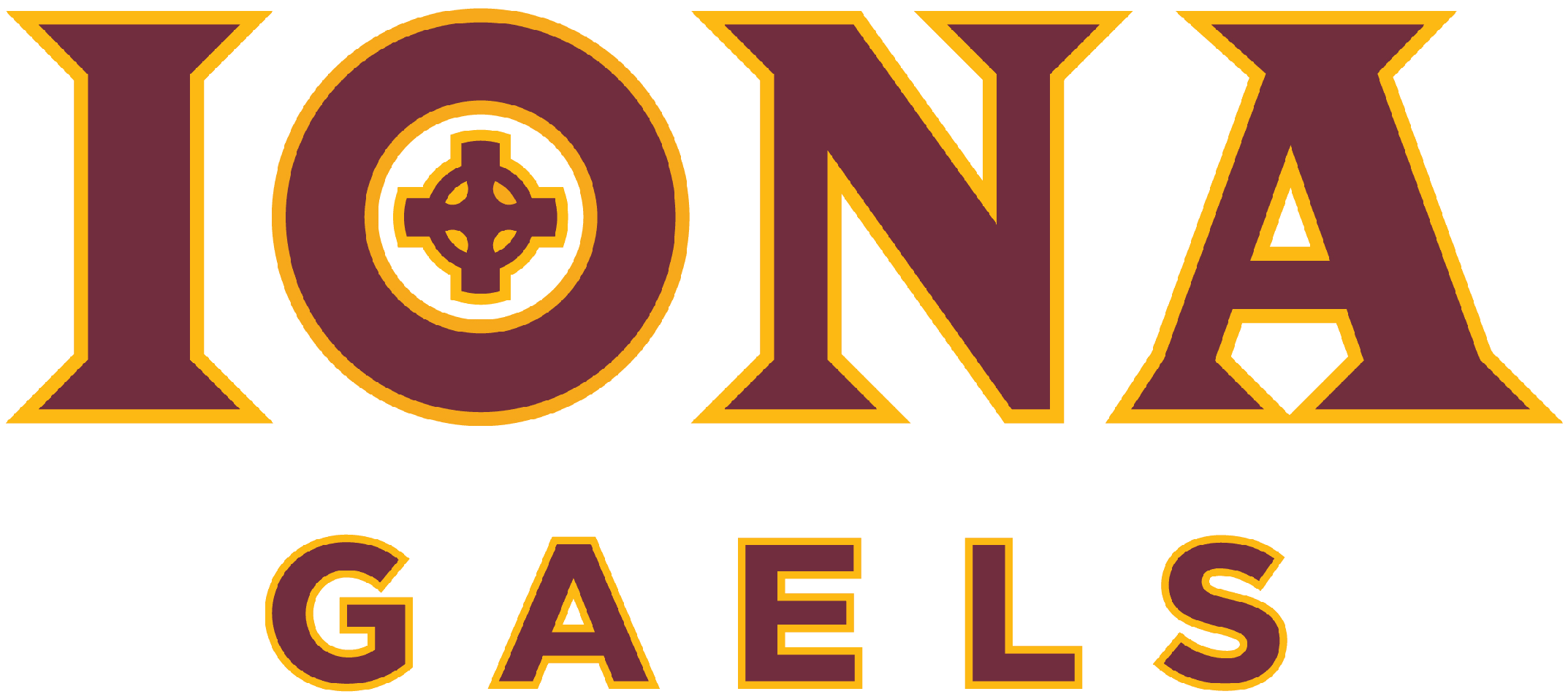
- Conference: Metro Atlantic Athletic Conference
- Record: 17–17 (12–8 MAAC)
- Head coach: Tobin Anderson (2nd season)
- Assistant coaches: Tom Bonacum; Kam Murrell; Patrick Wallace; Kyle Washington
- Home arena: Hynes Athletics Center

2024–25 MAAC men's basketball standings
	Conf.				Overall
Team	W		L	PCT	W		L	PCT
Quinnipiac	15	–	5	.750	20	–	13	.606
Merrimack	14	–	6	.700	18	–	15	.545
Marist	13	–	7	.650	20	–	10	.667
Iona	12	–	8	.600	17	–	17	.500
Manhattan	12	–	8	.600	17	–	14	.548
Mount St. Mary's †	12	–	8	.600	23	–	13	.639
Sacred Heart	10	–	10	.500	15	–	18	.455
Rider	9	–	11	.450	14	–	19	.424
Siena	9	–	11	.450	14	–	18	.438
Fairfield	8	–	12	.400	12	–	20	.375
Saint Peter's	7	–	13	.350	12	–	16	.429
Niagara	6	–	14	.300	11	–	20	.355
Canisius	3	–	17	.150	3	–	28	.097
† 2025 MAAC tournament winner

The 2024–25 Iona Gaels men's basketball team represented Iona University during the 2024–25 NCAA Division I men's basketball season. The Gaels, led by second-year head coach Tobin Anderson, played their home games at the Hynes Athletics Center located in New Rochelle, New York as members of the Metro Atlantic Athletic Conference. They finished the season 17–17, and 12–8 in MAAC play to finish in a tie for fourth place. They defeated Manhattan and Quinnipiac in the MAAC tournament before losing to Mount St. Mary's in the championship game.

On March 17, 2025, the school fired head coach Tobin Anderson after only two years as coach. On March 31, the school named New Orleans Pelicans' assistant coach Dan Geriot the team's new head coach.

== Previous season ==
The Gaels finished the 2023–24 season 16–17, 10–10 in MAAC play to finish in seventh place. They defeated Manhattan, before falling to Fairfield in the quarterfinals of the MAAC tournament.

== Roster ==
2024–25 Iona Gaels men's basketball team
Players
Coaches

Pos.	#	Name	Height	Weight	Year	Previous school	Hometown
G/F	0	James Patterson	6 ft 7 in (2.01 m)	200 lb (91 kg)	Jr	St. Thomas Aquinas College	Richmond, Virginia
F	1	Jacob Hogarth	6 ft 9 in (2.06 m)	210 lb (95 kg)	Fr	South Kent School	Brooklyn, New York
G	2	Adam Njie	6 ft 3 in (1.91 m)	175 lb (79 kg)	Fr	Cardinal Hayes HS	Bronx, New York
G	3	Dejour Reaves	6 ft 0 in (1.83 m)	170 lb (77 kg)	Sr	Northern Colorado	Syracuse, New York
F	4	Clarence Rupert	6 ft 8 in (2.03 m)	240 lb (109 kg)	Sr	Southern Illinois	Philadelphia, Pennsylvania
G	5	Tyruse Boock	6 ft 3 in (1.91 m)	190 lb (86 kg)	Jr	Mohawk Valley CC	New York, New York
F	7	Luke Jungers	6 ft 9 in (2.06 m)	220 lb (100 kg)	Jr	Omaha	Omaha, Nebraska
G	8	Christian Winborne	6 ft 2 in (1.88 m)	185 lb (84 kg)	Jr	Saint Joseph's	Baltimore, Maryland
G	10	Comeh Emuobor	6 ft 5 in (1.96 m)	205 lb (93 kg)	So	UCF	Raleigh, North Carolina
G	12	Josh Michigan	6 ft 4 in (1.93 m)	195 lb (88 kg)	Fr	Compass Academy	Brick, New Jersey
F	15	Connor Horan	6 ft 8 in (2.03 m)	230 lb (104 kg)	Fr	Blue Ridge School	Fairfax, Virginia
G	23	Jojo Wallace	6 ft 3 in (1.91 m)	175 lb (79 kg)	Fr	South Kent School	Milford, Connecticut
G	24	Justin Menard	6 ft 3 in (1.91 m)	175 lb (79 kg)	Fr	St. Thomas More School	Higganum, Connecticut
G	25	Kernan Bundy	6 ft 3 in (1.91 m)	190 lb (86 kg)	Jr	Hutchinson CC	Overland Park, Kansas
F	32	Yaphet Moundi	6 ft 8 in (2.03 m)	205 lb (93 kg)	Jr	Panola College	Paris, France
G/F	33	Jalen Barr	6 ft 4 in (1.93 m)	185 lb (84 kg)	Sr	Flagler College	Charlotte, North Carolina

Head coach

- Tobin Anderson (Wesleyan)

Assistant coach(es)

- Tom Bonacum (Ramapo)
- Kam Murrell (Memphis)
- Patrick Wallace (Charleston Southern)
- Kyle Washington (Cincinnati)

Legend

- (C) Team captain
- (S) Suspended
- (I) Ineligible
- (W) Walk-on
- Injured
- Current redshirt

Roster
Last update: November 11, 2024

== Schedule and results ==
Date time, TV	Rank^{#}	Opponent^{#}	Result	Record	Site (attendance) city, state
Regular season
November 4, 2024*; 7:00 pm, ESPN+		at Princeton	L 80–81	0–1	Jadwin Gymnasium (1,690); Princeton, NJ
November 8, 2024*; 7:00 pm, FloHoops/MSGSN		at Hofstra	L 76–90	0–2	Mack Sports Complex (3,347); Hempstead, NY
November 12, 2024*; 7:00 pm, ESPN+		Delaware	L 58–64	0–3	Hynes Athletics Center (2,028); New Rochelle, NY
November 15, 2024*; 7:00 pm, ESPN+		Vermont	W 62–59	1–3	Hynes Athletics Center (2,200); New Rochelle, NY
November 20, 2024*; 7:00 pm, ESPN+		at West Virginia	L 43–86	1–4	WVU Coliseum (8,591); Morgantown, WV
November 25, 2024*; 7:00 pm, ESPN+		Cornell	L 68–84	1–5	Hynes Athletics Center (2,000); New Rochelle, NY
November 29, 2024*; 2:00 pm, FloHoops		vs. Tarleton State; Nassau Championship	W 62–51	2–5	Baha Mar Convention Center (237); Nassau, Bahamas
November 30, 2024*; 2:00 pm, FloHoops		vs. Indiana State; Nassau Championship	L 80–83	2–6	Baha Mar Convention Center (325); Nassau, Bahamas
December 1, 2024*; 2:00 pm, FloHoops		vs. Rice; Nassau Championship	L 66–70	2–7	Baha Mar Convention Center (294); Nassau, Bahamas
December 6, 2024; 7:00 pm, ESPN+		at Sacred Heart	L 59–83	2–8 (0–1)	William H. Pitt Center (1,126); Fairfield, CT
December 8, 2024; 1:00 pm, ESPN+		Saint Peter's	W 72–63	3–8 (1–1)	Hynes Athletics Center (1,610); New Rochelle, NY
December 22, 2024*; 1:00 pm, ESPN+		at Colgate	W 79–73	4–8	Cotterell Court (787); Hamilton, NY
December 29, 2024*; 1:00 pm, ESPN+		Harvard	L 61–67	4–9	Hynes Athletics Center (1,610); New Rochelle, NY
January 3, 2025; 7:00 pm, ESPN+		Marist	L 65–70	4–10 (1–2)	Hynes Athletics Center (1,702); New Rochelle, NY
January 5, 2025; 2:00 pm, ESPN+		at Siena	W 74–73	5–10 (2–2)	MVP Arena (5,225); Albany, NY
January 10, 2025; 7:00 pm, ESPN+		at Fairfield	L 64–68	5–11 (2–3)	Leo D. Mahoney Arena (2,162); Fairfield, CT
January 12, 2025; 1:00 pm, ESPN+		Quinnipiac	L 62–63	5–12 (2–4)	Hynes Athletics Center (1,824); New Rochelle, NY
January 16, 2025; 7:00 pm, ESPN+		Canisius	W 82–61	6–12 (3–4)	Hynes Athletics Center (1,369); New Rochelle, NY
January 23, 2025; 7:00 pm, ESPN+		at Rider	W 73–67	7–12 (4–4)	Alumni Gymnasium (1,118); Lawrenceville, NJ
January 25, 2025; 1:00 pm, ESPN+		Siena	W 72–68	8–12 (5–4)	Hynes Athletics Center (1,643); New Rochelle, NY
January 31, 2025; 7:00 pm, ESPN+		at Manhattan	L 55–76	8–13 (5–5)	Draddy Gymnasium (1,982); Riverdale, NY
February 2, 2025; 1:00 pm, ESPN+		Fairfield	W 87–64	9–13 (6–5)	Hynes Athletics Center (2,082); New Rochelle, NY
February 6, 2025; 7:00 pm, ESPN+		at Mount St. Mary's	W 70–67 ^{OT}	10–13 (7–5)	Knott Arena (1,530); Emmitsburg, MD
February 8, 2025; 7:00 pm, ESPN+		at Marist	W 75–71	11–13 (8–5)	McCann Arena (3,037); Poughkeepsie, NY
February 14, 2025; 7:00 pm, ESPN+		Rider	L 71–74	11–14 (8–6)	Hynes Athletics Center (1,468); New Rochelle, NY
February 16, 2025; 2:00 pm, ESPN+		at Quinnipiac	L 74–79	11–15 (8–7)	M&T Bank Arena (1,643); Hamden, CT
February 21, 2025; 7:00 pm, ESPN+		Manhattan	W 65–60	12–15 (9–7)	Hynes Athletics Center (2,400); New Rochelle, NY
February 23, 2025; 1:00 pm, ESPN+		Merrimack	L 70–77 ^{OT}	12–16 (9–8)	Hynes Athletics Center (1,418); New Rochelle, NY
February 28, 2025; 6:30 pm, ESPN+		at Niagara	W 65–63	13–16 (10–8)	Gallagher Center (966); Lewiston, NY
March 2, 2025; 1:00 pm, ESPN+		at Canisius	W 82–52	14–16 (11–8)	Koessler Athletic Center (596); Buffalo, NY
March 8, 2025; 4:00 pm, ESPN+		Sacred Heart	W 90–88	15–16 (12–8)	Hynes Athletics Center (2,157); New Rochelle, NY
MAAC tournament
March 13, 2025; 6:00 pm, ESPN+	(4)	vs. (5) Manhattan; Quarterfinals	W 77–65	16–16	Boardwalk Hall; Atlantic City, NJ
March 14, 2025; 6:00 pm, ESPNews	(4)	vs. (1) Quinnipiac; Semifinals	W 81–73	17–16	Boardwalk Hall; Atlantic City, NJ
March 15, 2025; 7:30 pm, ESPNU	(4)	vs. (6) Mount St. Mary's; Championship	L 49–63	17–17	Boardwalk Hall; Atlantic City, NJ
*Non-conference game. ^{#}Rankings from AP Poll. (#) Tournament seedings in parentheses. All times are in Eastern.
