= 2025 MAAC men's basketball tournament =

American college basketball postseason tournament

- Classification: Division I
- Season: 2024–25
- Teams: 10
- Site: Jim Whelan Boardwalk Hall; Atlantic City, New Jersey
- Champions: Mount St. Mary's (1st title)
- Winning coach: Donny Lind (1st title)
- Television: ESPN+, ESPNEWS, ESPNU

2024–25 MAAC men's basketball standings
	Conf.				Overall
Team	W		L	PCT	W		L	PCT
Quinnipiac	15	–	5	.750	20	–	13	.606
Merrimack	14	–	6	.700	18	–	15	.545
Marist	13	–	7	.650	20	–	10	.667
Iona	12	–	8	.600	17	–	17	.500
Manhattan	12	–	8	.600	17	–	14	.548
Mount St. Mary's †	12	–	8	.600	23	–	13	.639
Sacred Heart	10	–	10	.500	15	–	18	.455
Rider	9	–	11	.450	14	–	19	.424
Siena	9	–	11	.450	14	–	18	.438
Fairfield	8	–	12	.400	12	–	20	.375
Saint Peter's	7	–	13	.350	12	–	16	.429
Niagara	6	–	14	.300	11	–	20	.355
Canisius	3	–	17	.150	3	–	28	.097
† 2025 MAAC tournament winner

The 2025 Metro Atlantic Athletic Conference men's basketball tournament was the postseason men's basketball tournament for the Metro Atlantic Athletic Conference for the 2024–25 NCAA Division I men's basketball season. The tournament was played March 11–15, 2025, at the Jim Whelan Boardwalk Hall in Atlantic City, New Jersey, for the sixth year in a row. The tournament winner, Mount St. Mary's, received the conference's automatic bid to the 2025 NCAA Division I men's basketball tournament.

== Seeds ==
The top 10 teams in the conference standings qualified for the tournament, marking the first time in the history of the conference that not every team participated in the event. The top six teams received byes to the quarterfinals. Teams were seeded by record within the conference, with a tiebreaker system to seed teams with identical conference records.

Seed	School	Conference	Tiebreaker
1	Quinnipiac	15–5	
2	Merrimack	14–6	
3	Marist	13–7	
4	Iona	12–8	2–1 vs. Manhattan/Mount St. Mary's
5	Manhattan	12–8	2–2 vs. Iona/Mount St. Mary's
6	Mount St. Mary's	12–8	1–2 vs. Iona/Manhattan
7	Sacred Heart	10–10	
8	Rider	9–11	1–0 vs. Siena
9	Siena	9–11	0–1 vs. Rider
10	Fairfield	8–12	
DNQ	Saint Peter's	7–13	
DNQ	Niagara	6–14	
DNQ	Canisius	3–17	

== Schedule ==
Session	Game	Time*	Matchup	Score	Attendance	Television
First round – Tuesday, March 11
1	1	6:00 pm	No. 8 Rider vs No. 9 Siena	78–76	1,928	ESPN+
1	2	8:30 pm	No. 7 Sacred Heart vs No. 10 Fairfield	71–58	1,928	ESPN+
Quarterfinals – Wednesday, March 12
2	3	6:00 pm	No. 1 Quinnipiac vs No. 8 Rider	78–64		ESPN+
2	4	8:30 pm	No. 2 Merrimack vs No. 7 Sacred Heart	66–62^{OT}		ESPN+
Quarterfinals – Thursday, March 13
3	5	6:00 pm	No. 4 Iona vs No. 5 Manhattan	77–65		ESPN+
3	6	8:30 pm	No. 3 Marist vs No. 6 Mount St. Mary's	58–62		ESPN+
Semifinals – Friday, March 14
4	7	6:00 pm	No. 1 Quinnipiac vs No. 4 Iona	73–81		ESPNews
4	8	8:30 pm	No. 2 Merrimack vs No. 6 Mount St. Mary's	55–57		ESPNews
Championship – Saturday, March 15
5	9	7:30 pm	No. 6 Mount St. Mary's vs No. 4 Iona	63–49		ESPNU
*Game times in EDT. Rankings denote tournament seeding.

== Bracket ==
First round March 11, 2025; ESPN+
8	Rider	78
9	Siena	76
7	Sacred Heart	71
10	Fairfield	58

Quarterfinals; March 12–13, 2025; ESPN+
1	Quinnipiac	78
8	Rider	64
4	Iona	77
5	Manhattan	65
2	Merrimack	66^{OT}
7	Sacred Heart	62
3	Marist	58
6	Mount St. Mary's	62

Semifinals; March 14, 2025
1	Quinnipiac	73
4	Iona	81
2	Merrimack	55
6	Mount St. Mary's	57

Championship; March 15, 2025
4	Iona	49
6	Mount St. Mary's	63

== See also ==
- 2025 MAAC women's basketball tournament
