= 2024–25 Mount St. Mary's Mountaineers men's basketball team =

American college basketball season

2024–25 Mount St. Mary's Mountaineers men's basketball
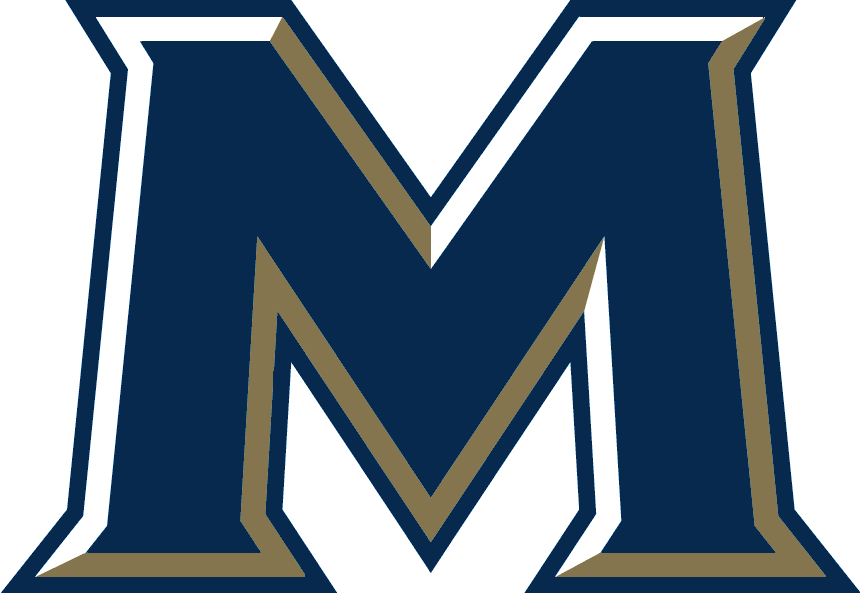

MAAC tournament champions

NCAA tournament, First round
- Conference: Metro Atlantic Athletic Conference
- Record: 23–13 (12–8 MAAC)
- Head coach: Donny Lind (1st season)
- Assistant coaches: Keith Chesley; Dave Matturro; Jeremy Freeman; Sidy Sall
- Home arena: Knott Arena

2024–25 MAAC men's basketball standings
	Conf.				Overall
Team	W		L	PCT	W		L	PCT
Quinnipiac	15	–	5	.750	20	–	13	.606
Merrimack	14	–	6	.700	18	–	15	.545
Marist	13	–	7	.650	20	–	10	.667
Iona	12	–	8	.600	17	–	17	.500
Manhattan	12	–	8	.600	17	–	14	.548
Mount St. Mary's †	12	–	8	.600	23	–	13	.639
Sacred Heart	10	–	10	.500	15	–	18	.455
Rider	9	–	11	.450	14	–	19	.424
Siena	9	–	11	.450	14	–	18	.438
Fairfield	8	–	12	.400	12	–	20	.375
Saint Peter's	7	–	13	.350	12	–	16	.429
Niagara	6	–	14	.300	11	–	20	.355
Canisius	3	–	17	.150	3	–	28	.097
† 2025 MAAC tournament winner

The 2024–25 Mount St. Mary's Mountaineers men's basketball team represented Mount St. Mary's University during the 2024–25 NCAA Division I men's basketball season. The Mountaineers, led by first-year head coach Donny Lind, played their home games at Knott Arena in Emmitsburg, Maryland as members of the Metro Atlantic Athletic Conference (MAAC).

The Mountaineers finished the season 23–13, 12–8 in MAAC play, to finish in a three-way tie for fourth place. In the MAAC tournament, they defeated Marist in the quarterfinals, Merrimack in the semifinals before besting Iona for the championship. In the NCAA tournament, they ousted American in the First Four before losing to Duke in the first round.

== Previous season ==
The Mountaineers finished the 2023–24 season 13–19, 9–11 in MAAC play, to finish in eighth place. They were defeated by Canisius in the first round of the MAAC tournament.

On April 10, 2024, it was announced that head coach Dan Engelstad would be resigning from his position as head coach after six seasons, in order to take an assistant coaching position at Syracuse. On April 20, the school announced that they would be hiring UNC Greensboro assistant coach Donny Lind as the team's next head coach.

== Roster ==
2024–25 Mount St. Mary's Mountaineers men's basketball team
Players
Coaches

Pos.	#	Name	Height	Weight	Year	Previous school	Hometown
G	1	Carmelo Pacheco	6 ft 5 in (1.96 m)	190 lb (86 kg)	So	UVA Wise	Harrisonburg, VA
G	2	Arlandus Keyes	6 ft 2 in (1.88 m)	173 lb (78 kg)	Jr	Ellsworth Community College	Florissant, MO
F	3	Jonathan Ogunfuye	6 ft 7 in (2.01 m)	190 lb (86 kg)	RS Fr	Spire Academy	Houston, TX
F	4	Dola Adebayo	6 ft 8 in (2.03 m)	210 lb (95 kg)	RS Jr	Canterbury School	Fort Myers, FL
G	5	Malcolm Dread	6 ft 4 in (1.93 m)	210 lb (95 kg)	RS Jr	Richmond	Detroit, MI
G	6	Jaxon Hartman	6 ft 3 in (1.91 m)	195 lb (88 kg)	RS Fr	West Virginia Wesleyan	Staunton, VA
F	7	Elijah Espinosa	6 ft 9 in (2.06 m)	200 lb (91 kg)	Fr	Red Land High School	Etters, PA
G	8	Dallas Hobbs	6 ft 1 in (1.85 m)	175 lb (79 kg)	So	Dynamic Prep	Dallas, TX
F	9	Abdou Khadre Kébé	6 ft 7 in (2.01 m)	170 lb (77 kg)	Fr	NBA Academy Latin America	Dakar, Senegal
G	10	Patrick Haigh	6 ft 4 in (1.93 m)	190 lb (86 kg)	So	Bishop Guilfoyle High School	Altoona, PA
G	12	Trey Wilson	6 ft 3 in (1.91 m)	188 lb (85 kg)	Fr	Miami Country Day School	Miramar, FL
F	13	Terrell Jr. Ard	6 ft 7 in (2.01 m)	200 lb (91 kg)	Sr	Presbyterian	Marietta, GA
F	14	Jedy Cordilia	6 ft 9 in (2.06 m)	210 lb (95 kg)	Sr	West Nottingham Academy	Tilburg, Netherlands
G	23	Javon Ervin	6 ft 3 in (1.91 m)	200 lb (91 kg)	Jr	Peninsula College	Tacoma, WA
G	45	Xavier Lipscomb	6 ft 2 in (1.88 m)	195 lb (88 kg)	GS	Radford	Washington, D.C.

Head coach

- Donny Lind (Loyola (MD))

Assistant coach(es)

- Keith Chesley (Maine–Augusta)
- Dave Matturro (St. John Fisher)
- Jeremy Freeman (Cornell)
- Sidy Sall (Christian Brothers)

Legend

- (C) Team captain
- (S) Suspended
- (I) Ineligible
- (W) Walk-on
- Injured
- Current redshirt

Roster
Last update: November 7, 2024

== Schedule and results ==
Date time, TV	Rank^{#}	Opponent^{#}	Result	Record	Site (attendance) city, state
Regular season
November 4, 2024*; 7:00 p.m., ESPN+		Notre Dame (MD)	W 98–62	1–0	Knott Arena (1,711); Emmitsburg, MD
November 8, 2024*; 8:00 p.m., BTN		at Maryland	L 52–86	1–1	Xfinity Center (11,726); College Park, MD
November 13, 2024*; 7:00 p.m., ESPN+		at Bucknell	W 93–89 ^{2OT}	2–1	Sojka Pavilion (1,381); Lewisburg, PA
November 16, 2024*; 7:00 p.m., ESPN+		Saint Francis; Georgetown MTE	W 66–58	3–1	Knott Arena (2,133); Emmitsburg, MD
November 20, 2024*; 8:30 p.m., FS1		at Georgetown; Georgetown MTE	L 51–79	3–2	Capital One Arena (2,756); Washington, D.C.
November 23, 2024*; 4:00 p.m., ESPN+		Delaware State	W 76–66	4–2	Knott Arena (1,590); Emmitsburg, MD
November 30, 2024*; 2:00 p.m., ESPN+		at Howard	W 79–75	5–2	Burr Gymnasium (655); Washington, D.C.
December 6, 2024; 7:00 p.m., ESPN+		at Marist	L 50–53	5–3 (0–1)	McCann Arena (1,596); Poughkeepsie, NY
December 8, 2024; 2:00 p.m., ESPN+		Fairfield	W 101–94	6–3 (1–1)	Knott Arena (1,213); Emmitsburg, MD
December 14, 2024*; 7:00 p.m., ESPN+		Loyola (MD)	L 69–77	6–4	Knott Arena (1,527); Emmitsburg, MD
December 18, 2024*; 7:00 p.m., NEC Front Row		at LIU	W 80–72	7–4	Steinberg Wellness Center (343); Brooklyn, NY
December 21, 2024*; 2:00 p.m., ACCNX/ESPN+		at Miami (FL)	W 78–74 ^{OT}	8–4	Watsco Center (5,539); Coral Gables, FL
December 28, 2024*; 2:00 p.m., ESPN+		at George Mason	L 56–64	8–5	EagleBank Arena (3,295); Fairfax, VA
January 5, 2025; 2:00 p.m., ESPN+		Niagara	W 68–62	9–5 (2–1)	Knott Arena (1,581); Emmitsburg, MD
January 10, 2025; 7:00 p.m., ESPN+		at Manhattan	W 75–66	10–5 (3–1)	Draddy Gymnasium (350); Riverdale, NY
January 12, 2025; 2:00 p.m., ESPN+		Sacred Heart	W 73–71	11–5 (4–1)	Knott Arena (1,980); Emmitsburg, MD
January 16, 2025; 7:00 p.m., ESPN+		at Rider	L 60–66	11–6 (4–2)	Alumni Gymnasium (1,624); Lawrenceville, NJ
January 18, 2025; 4:00 p.m., ESPN+		Quinnipiac	L 57–91	11–7 (4–3)	Knott Arena (2,140); Emmitsburg, MD
January 23, 2025; 7:00 p.m., ESPN+		at Siena	L 68–82	11–8 (4–4)	MVP Arena (4,444); Albany, NY
January 25, 2025; 4:00 p.m., ESPN+		Manhattan	L 64–74	11–9 (4–5)	Knott Arena (2,812); Emmitsburg, MD
January 31, 2025; 7:00 p.m., ESPN+		at Merrimack	W 66–58	12–9 (5–5)	Hammel Court (1,712); North Andover, MA
February 2, 2025; 2:00 p.m., ESPN+		at Saint Peter's	W 79–64	13–9 (6–5)	Run Baby Run Arena (679); Jersey City, NJ
February 6, 2025; 7:00 p.m., ESPN+		Iona	L 67–70 ^{OT}	13–10 (6–6)	Knott Arena (1,530); Emmitsburg, MD
February 14, 2025; 6:30 p.m., ESPN+		at Niagara	W 84–83	14–10 (7–6)	Gallagher Center (837); Lewiston, NY
February 16, 2025; 1:00 p.m., ESPN+		at Canisius	W 73–66	15–10 (8–6)	Koessler Athletic Center (548); Buffalo, NY
February 21, 2025; 7:00 p.m., ESPN+		Saint Peter's	W 69–58	16–10 (9–6)	Knott Arena (2,265); Emmitsburg, MD
February 23, 2025; 2:00 p.m., ESPN+		Rider	W 79–72	17–10 (10–6)	Knott Arena (1,830); Emmitsburg, MD
February 28, 2025; 7:00 p.m., ESPN+		at Fairfield	L 62–69	17–11 (10–7)	Leo D. Mahoney Arena (2,113); Fairfield, CT
March 2, 2025; 2:00 p.m., ESPN+		Siena	W 85–79	18–11 (11–7)	Knott Arena (1,425); Emmitsburg, MD
March 6, 2025; 7:00 p.m., ESPN+		at Quinnipiac	L 70–79	18–12 (11–8)	M&T Bank Arena (1,109); Hamden, CT
March 8, 2025; 4:00 p.m., ESPN+		Marist	W 62–52	19–12 (12–8)	Knott Arena (2,694); Emmitsburg, MD
MAAC tournament
March 13, 2025; 8:30 p.m., ESPN+	(6)	vs. (3) Marist; Quarterfinal	W 62–58	20–12	Boardwalk Hall (1,794); Atlantic City, NJ
March 14, 2025; 8:30 p.m., ESPNews	(6)	vs. (2) Merrimack; Semifinal	W 57–55	21–12	Boardwalk Hall (2,247); Atlantic City, NJ
March 15, 2025; 7:30 p.m., ESPNU	(6)	vs. (4) Iona; Championship	W 63–49	22–12	Boardwalk Hall; Atlantic City, NJ
NCAA tournament
March 19, 2025*; 6:40 p.m., TruTV	(16 E)	vs. (16 E) American; First Four	W 83–72	23–12	UD Arena (12,546); Dayton, OH
March 21, 2025*; 2:50 p.m., CBS	(16 E)	vs. (1 E) No. 1 Duke; First round	L 49–93	23–13	Lenovo Center (19,180); Raleigh, NC
*Non-conference game. ^{#}Rankings from AP poll. (#) Tournament seedings in parentheses. E=East. All times are in Eastern.
