= 2024–25 Wagner Seahawks men's basketball team =

American college basketball season

2024–25 Wagner Seahawks men's basketball
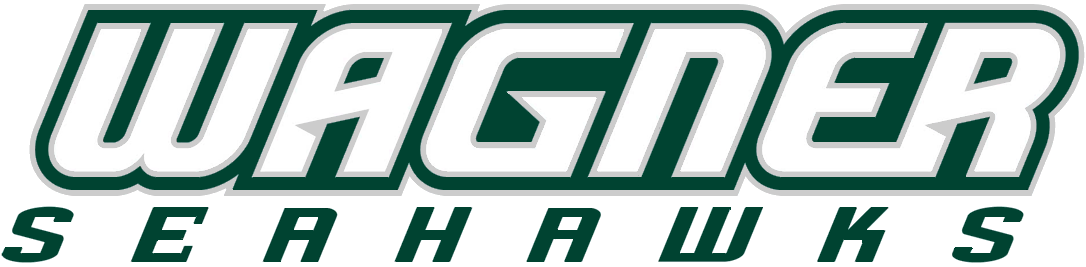
- Conference: Northeast Conference
- Record: 14–16 (6–10 NEC)
- Head coach: Donald Copeland (3rd season)
- Assistant coaches: Kevin Lynch; Kyle Smyth; Corey Fisher; Dwan McMillan
- Home arena: Spiro Sports Center

2024–25 Northeast Conference men's basketball standings
	Conf.				Overall
Team	W		L	PCT	W		L	PCT
Central Connecticut	14	–	2	.875	25	–	7	.781
LIU	12	–	4	.750	17	–	16	.515
Mercyhurst **	9	–	7	.563	15	–	16	.484
Saint Francis †	8	–	8	.500	16	–	18	.471
Fairleigh Dickinson	8	–	8	.500	13	–	20	.394
Stonehill *	7	–	9	.438	15	–	17	.469
Wagner	6	–	10	.375	14	–	16	.467
Chicago State	4	–	12	.250	4	–	28	.125
Le Moyne *	4	–	12	.250	9	–	23	.281
† 2025 NEC tournament winner * ineligible for the 2025 NCAA tournament due to transition from Division II ** ineligible for both the 2025 NEC tournament and the 2025 NCAA tournament due to transition from Division II

The 2024–25 Wagner Seahawks men's basketball team represented Wagner College during the 2024–25 NCAA Division I men's basketball season. The Seahawks, led by third-year head coach Donald Copeland, played their home games at the Spiro Sports Center in Staten Island, New York as members of the Northeast Conference (NEC). They finished the season 14–16, 6–10 in NEC play, to finish in seventh place.

== Previous season ==
The Seahawks finished the 2023–24 season 17–16, 7–9 in NEC play, to finish in sixth place. They defeated Sacred Heart, Central Connecticut and Merrimack to win the NEC tournament championship, earning their first NCAA tournament appearance since 2003, and, in turn, earning the NEC's automatic bid to the NCAA tournament. They received the #16 seed in the West Region, where they defeated Howard in the First Four before falling to top region seed North Carolina in the first round.

== Preseason polls ==
=== Northeast Conference poll ===
The Northeast Conference released its preseason coaches' poll on October 24, 2024. The Seahawks were picked to finish tied for first in the conference.

Rank	Team
T–1.	Central Connecticut (5)
T–1.	Wagner (4)
3.	Fairleigh Dickinson
4.	Le Moyne
5.	LIU
6.	Chicago State
7.	Mercyhurst
T-8.	Saint Francis
T-8.	Stonehill

() first-place votes

=== Preseason All-Conference Team ===
No Seahawks were selected as members of the NEC Preseason All-Conference Team.

== Roster ==
2024–25 Wagner Seahawks men's basketball team
Players
Coaches

Pos.	#	Name	Height	Weight	Year	Previous school	Hometown
G	0	Rahmir Moore	6 ft 3 in (1.91 m)	205 lb (93 kg)	GS	Saint Joseph's	Philadelphia, PA
G	1	Javier Ezquerra	6 ft 1 in (1.85 m)	175 lb (79 kg)	Sr	IMG Academy	San Juan, Puerto Rico
G	2	Di'Andre Howell-South	6 ft 4 in (1.93 m)	210 lb (95 kg)	RS Jr	St. Francis Brooklyn	Paterson, NJ
G	3	Ja'Kair Sanchez	6 ft 4 in (1.93 m)	200 lb (91 kg)	Sr	Minnesota State–Moorhead	Syracuse, NY
F	4	Tyje Kelton	6 ft 7 in (2.01 m)	210 lb (95 kg)	Sr	Monroe College	Dunellen, NJ
G	5	Zae Blake	6 ft 1 in (1.85 m)	180 lb (82 kg)	GS	Green Bay	Washington, D.C.
G	10	R.J. Greene	6 ft 5 in (1.96 m)	200 lb (91 kg)	Jr	LIU	The Bronx, NY
F	11	Zavier Fitch	6 ft 7 in (2.01 m)	210 lb (95 kg)	Fr	Brother Rice High School	Chicago, IL
G	12	Zaire Williams	6 ft 4 in (1.93 m)	200 lb (91 kg)	Sr	Eagle Academy	Brooklyn, NY
G/F	15	Makhai Anderson	6 ft 6 in (1.98 m)	195 lb (88 kg)	Fr	Solebury School	Hamden, CT
F	22	Churchill Bounds	6 ft 10 in (2.08 m)	260 lb (118 kg)	GS	Central Arkansas	Berlin, MD
F	24	Rob II Taylor	6 ft 7 in (2.01 m)	220 lb (100 kg)	Sr	St. Mark's School	Brooklyn, NY
F	32	Keyontae Lewis	6 ft 9 in (2.06 m)	260 lb (118 kg)	Jr	Lloyd C. Bird High School	Chesterfield, VA

Head coach

- Donald Copeland (Seton Hall)

Assistant coach(es)

- Kevin Lynch (Seton Hall)
- Kyle Smyth (Iona)
- Corey Fisher (Villanova)
- Dwan McMillan (Hofstra)

Legend

- (C) Team captain
- (S) Suspended
- (I) Ineligible
- (W) Walk-on
- Injured
- Current redshirt

Roster
Last update: November 26, 2024

== Schedule and results ==
Date time, TV	Rank^{#}	Opponent^{#}	Result	Record	High points	High rebounds	High assists	Site (attendance) city, state
Non-conference regular season
November 6, 2024*; 6:00 p.m., BTN		at No. 25 Rutgers	L 52–75	0–1	12 – Lewis	8 – Kelton	4 – Greene	Jersey Mike's Arena (8,000); Piscataway, NJ
November 9, 2024*; 1:00 p.m., NEC Front Row		Manor	W 94–52	1–1	17 – Sanchez	6 – Kelton	10 – Ezquerra	Spiro Sports Center (529); Staten Island, NY
November 13, 2024*; 6:30 p.m., FS2		at No. 22 St. John's	L 45–66	1–2	10 – Ezquerra	6 – Greene	3 – Ezquerra	Carnesecca Arena (4,751); Queens, NY
November 16, 2024*; 12:00 p.m., FS2		at Seton Hall	L 28–54	1–3	8 – Ezquerra	6 – Fitch	2 – Taylor II	Walsh Gymnasium (1,219); South Orange, NJ
November 19, 2024*; 7:00 p.m., ESPN+		at Boston University	W 60–58	2–3	19 – Greene	8 – Greene	6 – Ezquerra	Case Gym (622); Boston, MA
November 23, 2024*; 4:00 p.m., NEC Front Row		Springfield	W 81–46	3–3	19 – Williams	9 – Greene	4 – Ezquerra	Spiro Sports Center (105); Staten Island, NY
November 26, 2024*; 7:00 p.m., FS1		at Georgetown	L 41–66	3–4	8 – Ezquerra	8 – Lewis	4 – Ezquerra	McDonough Gymnasium (1,477); Washington, D.C.
December 4, 2024*; 7:00 p.m., NEC Front Row		Coppin State	W 65–52	4–4	22 – Sanchez	6 – Ezquerra	5 – Ezquerra	Spiro Sports Center (201); Staten Island, NY
December 8, 2024*; 1:00 p.m., DSN		at Maryland Eastern Shore	W 63–61	5–4	18 – Greene	7 – Lewis	3 – 2 tied	Hytche Athletic Center (100); Princess Anne, MD
December 14, 2024*; 4:00 p.m., ESPN+		at NJIT	W 50–43	6–4	15 – Sanchez	10 – Fitch	6 – Ezquerra	Wellness and Events Center (476); Newark, NJ
December 18, 2024*; 7:00 p.m., NEC Front Row		Manhattan	L 66–80	6–5	16 – Sanchez	7 – Kelton	6 – Ezquerra	Spiro Sports Center (407); Staten Island, NY
December 21, 2024*; 2:30 p.m., NEC Front Row		Penn State Fayette	W 83–52	7–5	20 – Williams	13 – Greene	11 – Ezquerra	Spiro Sports Center (232); Staten Island, NY
December 23, 2024*; 12:00 p.m., NEC Front Row		Penn State Scranton	W 120–30	8–5	24 – Williams	9 – Lewis	10 – Greene	Spiro Sports Center (147); Staten Island, NY
NEC regular season
January 3, 2025; 7:00 p.m., NEC Front Row		Chicago State	L 52–64	8–6 (0–1)	16 – Williams	6 – Williams	4 – Ezquerra	Spiro Sports Center (191); Staten Island, NY
January 5, 2025; 1:00 p.m., NEC Front Row		Fairleigh Dickinson	L 59–71	8–7 (0–2)	20 – Blake	7 – Lewis	4 – Ezquerra	Spiro Sports Center; Staten Island, NY
January 10, 2025; 7:00 p.m., NEC Front Row		at Central Connecticut	W 62–57	9–7 (1–2)	19 – Sanchez	7 – 2 tied	4 – Ezquerra	William H. Detrick Gymnasium (1,303); New Britain, CT
January 18, 2025; 1:00 p.m., NEC Front Row		Mercyhurst	L 65–69	9–8 (1–3)	17 – Greene	6 – Lewis	5 – Ezquerra	Spiro Sports Center (217); Staten Island, NY
January 20, 2025; 1:00 p.m., NEC Front Row		Saint Francis (PA)	W 70–68 ^{2OT}	10–8 (2–3)	24 – Sanchez	12 – Lewis	5 – Ezquerra	Spiro Sports Center (250); Staten Island, NY
January 24, 2025; 7:00 p.m., NEC Front Row		at Mercyhurst	L 66–71	10–9 (2–4)	18 – Blake	10 – Lewis	3 – Blake	Owen McCormick Court (412); Erie, PA
January 26, 2025; 2:00 p.m., NEC Front Row		at Saint Francis (PA)	W 68–66	11–9 (3–4)	12 – Williams	7 – Williams	5 – Ezquerra	DeGol Arena (1,017); Loretto, PA
January 30, 2025; 7:00 p.m., NEC Front Row		at Stonehill	L 61–73	11–10 (3–5)	12 – Williams	5 – Greene	6 – Ezquerra	Merkert Gymnasium (872); Easton, MA
February 1, 2025; 1:00 p.m., NEC Front Row		Le Moyne	W 73–61	12–10 (4–5)	16 – Williams	5 – 2 tied	5 – 2 tied	Spiro Sports Center (807); Staten Island, NY
February 6, 2025; 7:00 p.m., NEC Front Row		LIU	L 47–60	12–11 (4–6)	13 – Williams	8 – Lewis	5 – Ezquerra	Spiro Sports Center (1,035); Staten Island, NY
February 8, 2025; 1:00 p.m., NEC Front Row		at Fairleigh Dickinson	L 58–69	12–12 (4–7)	15 – Williams	8 – 2 tied	4 – Ezquerra	Bogota Savings Bank Center (246); Hackensack, NJ
February 13, 2025; 7:00 p.m., NEC Front Row		at Le Moyne	L 68–72 ^{OT}	12–13 (4–8)	15 – Greene	8 – Williams	2 – 3 tied	Ted Grant Court (472); DeWitt, NY
February 20, 2025; 7:00 p.m., NEC Front Row		Stonehill	W 63–57	13–13 (5–8)	17 – Blake	6 – Greene	4 – Ezquerra	Spiro Sports Center; Staten Island, NY
February 22, 2025; 2:00 p.m., NEC Front Row		at Chicago State	W 64–52	14–13 (6–8)	20 – Williams	9 – Williams	5 – Blake	Jones Convocation Center (235); Chicago, IL
February 27, 2025; 7:00 p.m., NEC Front Row		at LIU	L 47–60	14–14 (6–9)	14 – Blake	6 – Fitch	4 – Ezquerra	Steinberg Wellness Center (499); Brooklyn, NY
March 1, 2025; 1:00 p.m., ESPNU/ESPN+		Central Connecticut	L 48–55	14–15 (6–10)	17 – Blake	6 – Howell-South	5 – Ezquerra	Spiro Sports Center (1,702); Staten Island, NY
NEC tournament
March 5, 2025; 7:00 p.m., NEC Front Row	(6)	at (3) Saint Francis (PA); Quarterfinals	L 55–58	14–16	16 – Williams	8 – Fitch	5 – Ezquerra	DeGol Arena (724); Loretto, PA
*Non-conference game. ^{#}Rankings from AP poll. (#) Tournament seedings in parentheses. All times are in Eastern.
