= 2024–25 Mercyhurst Lakers men's basketball team =

American college basketball season

2024–25 Mercyhurst Lakers men's basketball
- Conference: Northeast Conference
- Record: 15–16 (9–7 NEC)
- Head coach: Gary Manchel (23rd season)
- Assistant coaches: Joe Causgrove; Andrew Garcia; Justin Lindner; Chance Wright
- Home arena: Owen McCormick Court

2024–25 Northeast Conference men's basketball standings
| | Conf. | | | | Overall |
| Team | W | | L | PCT | W | | L | PCT |
|---|---|---|---|---|---|---|---|---|
| Central Connecticut | 14 | – | 2 | .875 | 25 | – | 7 | .781 |
| LIU | 12 | – | 4 | .750 | 17 | – | 16 | .515 |
| Mercyhurst ** | 9 | – | 7 | .563 | 15 | – | 16 | .484 |
| Saint Francis † | 8 | – | 8 | .500 | 16 | – | 18 | .471 |
| Fairleigh Dickinson | 8 | – | 8 | .500 | 13 | – | 20 | .394 |
| Stonehill * | 7 | – | 9 | .438 | 15 | – | 17 | .469 |
| Wagner | 6 | – | 10 | .375 | 14 | – | 16 | .467 |
| Chicago State | 4 | – | 12 | .250 | 4 | – | 28 | .125 |
| Le Moyne * | 4 | – | 12 | .250 | 9 | – | 23 | .281 |
† 2025 NEC tournament winner * ineligible for the 2025 NCAA tournament due to transition from Division II ** ineligible for both the 2025 NEC tournament and the 2025 NCAA tournament due to transition from Division II

The 2024–25 Mercyhurst Lakers men's basketball team represented Mercyhurst University during the 2024–25 NCAA Division I men's basketball season. The Lakers, led by 23rd-year head coach Gary Manchel, played their home games on Owen McCormick Court in the Mercyhurst Athletic Center in Erie, Pennsylvania as first-year members of the Northeast Conference.

This season marked Mercyhurst's first year of a four-year transition period from Division II to Division I. As a result, the Lakers are not eligible to participate in the NCAA tournament until the 2028–29 season.

== Previous season ==
The Lakers finished the 2023–24 season 15–16, 11–11 in PSAC play to finish in fifth place in the West division. They were defeated by IUP in the first round of the PSAC tournament.

== Preseason polls ==
=== Northeast Conference poll ===
The Northeast Conference released its preseason coaches' poll on October 24, 2024. The Lakers were picked to finish in seventh in the conference.

| Rank | Team |
|---|---|
| T-1. | Central Connecticut (5) |
| T-1. | Wagner (4) |
| 3. | Fairleigh Dickinson |
| 4. | Le Moyne |
| 5. | LIU |
| 6. | Chicago State |
| 7. | Mercyhurst |
| T-8. | Saint Francis |
| T-8. | Stonehill |

() first-place votes

=== Preseason All-Conference Team ===
Graduate student forward Jeff Planutis was selected as a member of the NEC Preseason All-Conference Team.

== Roster ==
2024–25 Mercyhurst Lakers men's basketball team
Players
Coaches

| Pos. | # | Name | Height | Weight | Year | Previous school | Hometown |
|---|---|---|---|---|---|---|---|
| G | 0 | Deshaun Jackson Jr. | 6 ft 2 in (1.88 m) | 175 lb (79 kg) | Fr | Newport High School | Covington, Kentucky |
| G | 1 | Sean Lang | 6 ft 3 in (1.91 m) | 205 lb (93 kg) | GS | Linganore High School | New Market, Maryland |
| F | 2 | Qadir Martin | 6 ft 5 in (1.96 m) | 215 lb (98 kg) | Fr | St. Peter's Boys High School | Staten Island, New York |
| G | 4 | Bernie Blunt III | 5 ft 11 in (1.8 m) | 180 lb (82 kg) | Sr | Edinboro | Morgantown, Pennsylvania |
| F | 5 | Mykolas Ivanauskas | 6 ft 8 in (2.03 m) | 215 lb (98 kg) | Fr | Sunrise Christian Academy | Chicago, Illinois |
| G | 10 | Christian Gamble | 6 ft 0 in (1.83 m) | 195 lb (88 kg) | Jr | Sidwell Friends School | Silver Spring, Maryland |
| G | 11 | Jake Lemelman | 6 ft 2 in (1.88 m) | 165 lb (75 kg) | Fr | MacDuffie School | Newton, Massachusetts |
| F | 12 | Jesse Hafemeister | 6 ft 5 in (1.96 m) | 190 lb (86 kg) | GS | Catholic | Mendham, New Jersey |
| F | 21 | Max Jusianiec | 6 ft 7 in (2.01 m) | 210 lb (95 kg) | Jr | Saint Rose | Alfred, New York |
| G | 22 | Shemar Rathan-Mayes | 5 ft 10 in (1.78 m) | 175 lb (79 kg) | GS | UNC Wilmington | Toronto, Ontario |
| F | 23 | Charles McClennahan Jr. | 6 ft 8 in (2.03 m) | 210 lb (95 kg) | Jr | Butler Community College | Winston-Salem, North Carolina |
| F | 31 | Jeff Planutis | 6 ft 6 in (1.98 m) | 215 lb (98 kg) | GS | Woodstock Academy | Hazleton, Pennsylvania |
| F | 32 | Aidan Reichert | 6 ft 4 in (1.93 m) | 215 lb (98 kg) | Sr | Jackson Center High School | Jackson Center, Ohio |
| F | 34 | James Thomas | 6 ft 6 in (1.98 m) | 230 lb (104 kg) | Jr | Chatham | Sharpsville, Pennsylvania |

Head coach

- Gary Manchel (Vermont)

Assistant coach(es)

- Joe Causgrove (Penn State Behrend)
- Andrew Garcia (Tulane)
- Justin Lindner (Florida State)
- Chance Wright (Mercyhurst)

Legend

- (C) Team captain
- (S) Suspended
- (I) Ineligible
- (W) Walk-on
- Injured
- Current redshirt

Roster
Last update: October 1, 2024

== Schedule and results ==
| Date time, TV | Rank^{#} | Opponent^{#} | Result | Record | Site (attendance) city, state |
Non-conference regular season
| November 4, 2024*; 8:00 pm, ESPN+ | | at George Washington | L 59–76 | 0–1 | Charles E. Smith Center (1,851); Washington, D.C. |
| November 6, 2024*; 7:00 pm | | at Morgan State | W 78–73 | 1–1 | Hill Field House (2,345); Baltimore, MD |
| November 9, 2024*; 3:00 pm, NEC Front Row | | Houghton | W 88–62 | 2–1 | Owen McCormick Court (702); Erie, PA |
| November 13, 2024*; 7:00 pm, NEC Front Row | | Canisius | W 62–52 | 3–1 | Owen McCormick Court (987); Erie, PA |
| November 16, 2024*; 12:00 pm, ESPN+ | | at Columbia | L 63–77 | 3–2 | Levien Gymnasium (658); New York, NY |
| November 19, 2024*; 7:00 pm, NEC Front Row | | Mount Aloysius | W 98–45 | 4–2 | Owen McCormick Court (503); Erie, PA |
| November 24, 2024*; 4:00 pm, Altitude Sports | | at Air Force; Cal Classic | L 48–82 | 4–3 | Clune Arena (1,737); Colorado Springs, CO |
| November 27, 2024*; 7:00 pm, ACCNX | | at California; Cal Classic | L 55–81 | 4–4 | Haas Pavilion (2,093); Berkeley, CA |
| November 30, 2024*; 10:00 pm, ESPN+ | | at Sacramento State; Cal Classic | W 66–60 | 5–4 | Hornets Nest (415); Sacramento, CA |
| December 1, 2024*; 4:00 pm, ESPN+ | | at San Francisco | L 59–87 | 5–5 | Sobrato Center (1,234); San Francisco, CA |
| December 7, 2024*; 3:00 pm, NEC Front Row | | Lafayette | L 73–77 | 5–6 | Owen McCormick Court (300); Erie, PA |
| December 10, 2024*; 7:00 pm, NEC Front Row | | Penn State Altoona | W 77–51 | 6–6 | Owen McCormick Court (154); Erie, PA |
| December 15, 2024*; 5:00 pm, ESPN+ | | at Kent State | L 57–82 | 6–7 | MAC Center (1,376); Kent, OH |
| December 18, 2024*; 5:00 pm, ESPN+ | | at Binghamton | L 60–62 | 6–8 | Dr. Bai Lee Court (2,008); Vestal, NY |
| December 22, 2024*; 2:00 pm, ESPN+ | | at West Virginia | L 46–67 | 6–9 | WVU Coliseum (10,777); Morgantown, WV |
NEC regular season
| January 3, 2025; 7:00 pm, NEC Front Row | | Stonehill | W 76–69 | 7–9 (1–0) | Owen McCormick Court (187); Erie, PA |
| January 5, 2025; 1:00 pm, NEC Front Row | | Central Connecticut | L 50–62 | 7–10 (1–1) | Owen McCormick Court (246); Erie, PA |
| January 10, 2025; 7:00 pm, NEC Front Row | | at Saint Francis | L 59–73 | 7–11 (1–2) | DeGol Arena (665); Loretto, PA |
| January 12, 2025; 2:00 pm, NEC Front Row | | at Le Moyne | L 63–79 | 7–12 (1–3) | Ted Grant Court (479); DeWitt, NY |
| January 18, 2025; 1:00 pm, NEC Front Row | | at Wagner | W 69–65 | 8–12 (2–3) | Spiro Sports Center (217); Staten Island, NY |
| January 20, 2025; 2:00 pm, NEC Front Row | | at LIU | L 63–72 ^{OT} | 8–13 (2–4) | Steinberg Wellness Center (250); Brooklyn, NY |
| January 24, 2025; 7:00 pm, NEC Front Row | | Wagner | W 71–66 | 9–13 (3–4) | Owen McCormick Court (412); Erie, PA |
| January 26, 2025; 1:00 pm, NEC Front Row | | LIU | W 85–80 ^{2OT} | 10–13 (4–4) | Owen McCormick Court (310); Erie, PA |
| January 30, 2025; 7:00 pm, NEC Front Row | | Saint Francis | W 62–58 | 11–13 (5–4) | Owen McCormick Court (755); Erie, PA |
| February 1, 2025; 3:30 pm, NEC Front Row | | at Fairleigh Dickinson | W 67–60 | 12–13 (6–4) | Bogota Savings Bank Center (346); Hackensack, NJ |
| February 6, 2025; NEC Front Row | | at Chicago State | L 78–85 | 12–14 (6–5) | Jones Convocation Center (85); Chicago, IL |
| February 8, 2025; 3:00 pm, NEC Front Row | | Le Moyne | W 82–78 | 13–14 (7–5) | Owen McCormick Court (684); Erie, PA |
| February 13, 2025; 7:00 pm, NEC Front Row | | at Central Connecticut | L 63–73 | 13–15 (7–6) | William H. Detrick Gymnasium (1,042); New Britain, CT |
| February 15, 2025; 1:00 pm, ESPN+/SportsNet Pittsburgh | | at Stonehill | L 73–85 | 13–16 (7–7) | Merkert Gymnasium (848); Easton, MA |
| February 20, 2025; 7:00 pm, NEC Front Row | | Fairleigh Dickinson | W 65–60 | 14–16 (8–7) | Owen McCormick Court (879); Erie, PA |
| February 27, 2025; 7:00 pm, NEC Front Row | | Chicago State | W 90–68 | 15–16 (9–7) | Owen McCormick Court (654); Erie, PA |
*Non-conference game. ^{#}Rankings from AP Poll. (#) Tournament seedings in parentheses. All times are in Eastern.
