= 2024–25 LIU Sharks men's basketball team =

American college basketball season

2024–25 LIU Sharks men's basketball
- Conference: Northeast Conference
- Record: 17–16 (12–4 NEC)
- Head coach: Rod Strickland (3rd season)
- Assistant coaches: Gerald Gillion; Derrick Phelps; Dalmar Ali
- Home arena: Steinberg Wellness Center and Barclays Center

2024–25 Northeast Conference men's basketball standings
	Conf.				Overall
Team	W		L	PCT	W		L	PCT
Central Connecticut	14	–	2	.875	25	–	7	.781
LIU	12	–	4	.750	17	–	16	.515
Mercyhurst **	9	–	7	.563	15	–	16	.484
Saint Francis †	8	–	8	.500	16	–	18	.471
Fairleigh Dickinson	8	–	8	.500	13	–	20	.394
Stonehill *	7	–	9	.438	15	–	17	.469
Wagner	6	–	10	.375	14	–	16	.467
Chicago State	4	–	12	.250	4	–	28	.125
Le Moyne *	4	–	12	.250	9	–	23	.281
† 2025 NEC tournament winner * ineligible for the 2025 NCAA tournament due to transition from Division II ** ineligible for both the 2025 NEC tournament and the 2025 NCAA tournament due to transition from Division II

The 2024–25 LIU Sharks men's basketball team represented Long Island University in the 2024–25 NCAA Division I men's basketball season. The Sharks, led by third-year head coach Rod Strickland, played their home games at the Steinberg Wellness Center in Brooklyn, New York as members of the Northeast Conference (NEC).

== Previous season ==
The Sharks finished the 2023–24 season 7–21, 6–10 in NEC play, to finish in seventh place. As the No. 7 seed, they were defeated by No. 2 seed Merrimack in the quarterfinals of the NEC tournament.

== Preseason polls ==
=== Northeast Conference poll ===
The Northeast Conference released its preseason coaches' poll on October 24, 2024. The Sharks were picked to finish fifth in the conference.

Rank	Team
T–1.	Central Connecticut (5)
T–1.	Wagner (4)
3.	Fairleigh Dickinson
4.	Le Moyne
5.	LIU
6.	Chicago State
7.	Mercyhurst
T–8.	Saint Francis
T–8.	Stonehill

() first-place votes

=== Preseason All-Conference Team ===
Redshirt junior guard Malachi Davis was selected as a member of the NEC Preseason All-Conference Team.

== Roster ==
2024–25 LIU Sharks men's basketball team
Players
Coaches

Pos.	#	Name	Height	Weight	Year	Hometown
G	0	Malachi Davis	6 ft 4 in (1.93 m)	172 lb (78 kg)	RS Jr	Toronto, ON
F/C	1	Tyrone Baker	6 ft 10 in (2.08 m)	210 lb (95 kg)	RS Jr	Fort Myers, FL
G	2	Blake Lander	6 ft 5 in (1.96 m)	205 lb (93 kg)	Jr	Beverly Hills, CA
G/F	4	Tre'shawn Sheppard	6 ft 6 in (1.98 m)	230 lb (104 kg)	RS Fr	Brooklyn, NY
F	8	Jason Steele	6 ft 6 in (1.98 m)	190 lb (86 kg)	So	Flushing, NY
G	9	Jalen "Roc" Lee	6 ft 7 in (2.01 m)	212 lb (96 kg)	Fr	Atlanta, GA
G	10	A.J. Jr. Neal	6 ft 2 in (1.88 m)	195 lb (88 kg)	Jr	Orlando, FL
G	11	Terell Strickland	6 ft 0 in (1.83 m)	175 lb (79 kg)	Sr	Tampa, FL
G	12	Brent Davis	6 ft 4 in (1.93 m)	200 lb (91 kg)	Sr	Miramar, FL
G	13	Hunter Hausman	6 ft 2 in (1.88 m)	175 lb (79 kg)	RS So	Bethesda, MD
G	14	Eddie Munyak	6 ft 0 in (1.83 m)	185 lb (84 kg)	Fr	Huntington, NY
F	22	Shadrak Lasu	6 ft 8 in (2.03 m)	200 lb (91 kg)	Fr	Winnipeg, MB
G	24	Gavin Pendergast	6 ft 4 in (1.93 m)	185 lb (84 kg)	Fr	Minneapolis, MN
F	33	Jamal Fuller	6 ft 5 in (1.96 m)	215 lb (98 kg)	Sr	Toronto, ON
F	34	Xinyi Li	6 ft 9 in (2.06 m)	235 lb (107 kg)	So	Beijing, China

Head coach

- Rod Strickland (DePaul)

Assistant coach(es)

- Gerald Gillion (Florida State)
- Derrick Phelps (North Carolina)
- Dalmar Ali (Laurentian)

Legend

- (C) Team captain
- (S) Suspended
- (I) Ineligible
- (W) Walk-on
- Injured
- Current redshirt

Roster
Last update: January 25, 2025

== Schedule and results ==
Date time, TV	Rank^{#}	Opponent^{#}	Result	Record	Site (attendance) city, state
Non-conference regular season
November 4, 2024*; 7:30 p.m., SECN		at No. 24 Ole Miss	L 60–90	0–1	SJB Pavilion (7,982); Oxford, MS
November 9, 2024*; 12:00 p.m., NEC Front Row		Pratt Institute	W 102–42	1–1	Steinberg Wellness Center (242); Brooklyn, NY
November 11, 2024*; 4:00 p.m., Altitude/MW Network		at Air Force	W 63–54	2–1	Clune Arena (409); Colorado Springs, CO
November 15, 2024*; 10:00 p.m., ESPN+		at California Baptist	L 77–90	2–2	Fowler Events Center (4,233); Riverside, CA
November 20, 2024*; 7:00 p.m., NEC Front Row		Columbia	L 72–80	2–3	Steinberg Wellness Center; Brooklyn, NY
November 23, 2024*; 12:30 p.m., ESPN+		at Charlotte	W 79–76	3–3	Dale F. Halton Arena (2,321); Charlotte, NC
November 25, 2024*; 6:30 p.m., ESPN+		at Winthrop	L 65–87	3–4	Winthrop Coliseum (1,119); Rock Hill, SC
November 29, 2024*; 4:30 p.m., ESPN+		at Lafayette; Lafayette MTE	L 56–75	3–5	Kirby Sports Center (829); Easton, PA
November 30, 2024*; 2:00 p.m., ESPN+		vs. Binghamton; Lafayette MTE	L 70–75 ^{OT}	3–6	Kirby Sports Center (237); Easton, PA
December 1, 2024*; 12:00 p.m., ESPN+		vs. Niagara; Lafayette MTE	L 52–60	3–7	Kirby Sports Center (209); Easton, PA
December 4, 2024*; 7:00 p.m.		CUNY–York	W 103–53	4–7	Steinberg Wellness Center (241); Brooklyn, NY
December 11, 2024*; 6:00 p.m., ESPN+		at UMass Lowell	L 62–69	4–8	Costello Athletic Center (427); Lowell, MA
December 14, 2024*; 12:00 p.m., SECN		at Missouri	L 61–88	4–9	Mizzou Arena (8,969); Columbia, MO
December 18, 2024*; 7:00 p.m., NEC Front Row		Mount St. Mary's	L 72–80	4–10	Steinberg Wellness Center (343); Brooklyn, NY
December 21, 2024*; 1:00 p.m., NEC Front Row		Lehigh	L 59–60	4–11	Steinberg Wellness Center (318); Brooklyn, NY
NEC regular season
January 3, 2025; 7:00 p.m., NEC Front Row		Le Moyne	W 78–62	5–11 (1–0)	Barclays Center (350); Brooklyn, NY
January 5, 2025; 2:00 p.m., NEC Front Row		Chicago State	W 53–39	6–11 (2–0)	Steinberg Wellness Center (129); Brooklyn, NY
January 10, 2025; 7:00 p.m., NEC Front Row		at Stonehill	W 70–60	7–11 (3–0)	Merkert Gymnasium (625); Easton, MA
January 12, 2025; 1:00 p.m., NEC Front Row		at Central Connecticut	W 54–52	8–11 (4–0)	William H. Detrick Gymnasium (816); New Britain, CT
January 18, 2025; 2:00 p.m., NEC Front Row		Saint Francis	W 64–51	9–11 (5–0)	Steinberg Wellness Center (816); Brooklyn, NY
January 20, 2025; 7:00 p.m., NEC Front Row		Mercyhurst	W 72–63 ^{OT}	10–11 (6–0)	Steinberg Wellness Center (250); Brooklyn, NY
January 24, 2025; 7:00 p.m., NEC Front Row		at Saint Francis	L 64–74	10–12 (6–1)	DeGol Arena (969); Loretto, PA
January 26, 2025; 1:00 p.m., NEC Front Row		at Mercyhurst	L 80–85 ^{2OT}	10–13 (6–2)	Owen McCormick Court (310); Erie, PA
January 30, 2025; 7:00 p.m., NEC Front Row		Central Connecticut	L 50–63	10–14 (6–3)	Steinberg Wellness Center (276); Brooklyn, NY
February 1, 2025; 1:00 p.m., NEC Front Row		at Chicago State	L 67–73 ^{OT}	10–15 (6–4)	Jones Convocation Center (185); Chicago, IL
February 6, 2025; 7:00 p.m., NEC Front Row		at Wagner	W 60–47	11–15 (7–4)	Spiro Sports Center (1,035); Staten Island, NY
February 8, 2025; 2:00 p.m., NEC Front Row		Stonehill	W 62–59	12–15 (8–4)	Steinberg Wellness Center (317); Brooklyn, NY
February 15, 2025; 2:00 p.m., NEC Front Row		Fairleigh Dickinson	W 62–58	13–15 (9–4)	Steinberg Wellness Center (222); Brooklyn, NY
February 22, 2025; 4:00 p.m., ESPN+		at Le Moyne	W 76–61	14–15 (10–4)	Ted Grant Court (861); DeWitt, NY
February 27, 2025; 7:00 p.m., NEC Front Row		Wagner	W 60–47	15–15 (11–4)	Steinberg Wellness Center (499); Brooklyn, NY
March 1, 2025; 1:00 p.m., NEC Front Row		at Fairleigh Dickinson	W 74–55	16–15 (12–4)	Bogota Savings Bank Center (587); Hackensack, NJ
NEC tournament
March 5, 2025; 7:00 p.m., NEC Front Row	(2)	(7) Chicago State; Quarterfinals	W 68–57	17–15	Steinberg Wellness Center (278); Brooklyn, NY
March 8, 2025; 12:00 p.m., ESPN+	(2)	(3) Saint Francis; Semifinals	L 68–71	17–16	Steinberg Wellness Center (613); Brooklyn, NY
*Non-conference game. ^{#}Rankings from AP poll. (#) Tournament seedings in parentheses. All times are in Eastern.
