= 2024–25 Central Connecticut Blue Devils men's basketball team =

American college basketball season

2024–25 Central Connecticut Blue Devils men's basketball
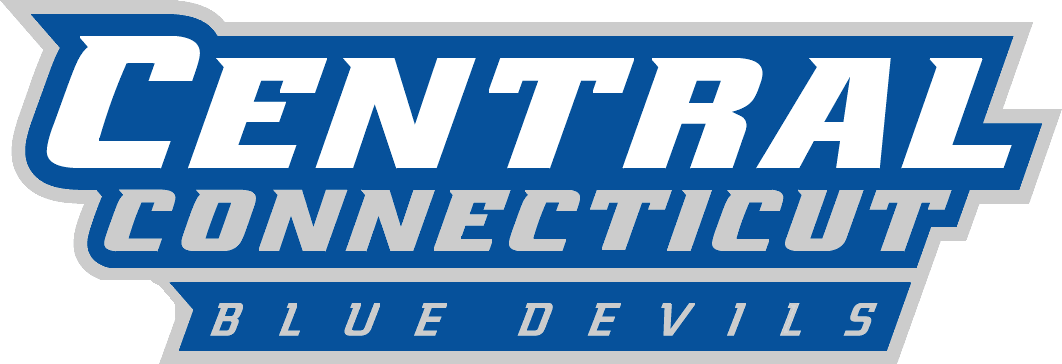

NEC regular-season champions
- Conference: Northeast Conference
- Record: 25–7 (14–2 NEC)
- Head coach: Patrick Sellers (4th season)
- Assistant coaches: Ben Wood; Lenny Jefferson; Ryan Olander
- Home arena: William H. Detrick Gymnasium

2024–25 Northeast Conference men's basketball standings
	Conf.				Overall
Team	W		L	PCT	W		L	PCT
Central Connecticut	14	–	2	.875	25	–	7	.781
LIU	12	–	4	.750	17	–	16	.515
Mercyhurst **	9	–	7	.563	15	–	16	.484
Saint Francis †	8	–	8	.500	16	–	18	.471
Fairleigh Dickinson	8	–	8	.500	13	–	20	.394
Stonehill *	7	–	9	.438	15	–	17	.469
Wagner	6	–	10	.375	14	–	16	.467
Chicago State	4	–	12	.250	4	–	28	.125
Le Moyne *	4	–	12	.250	9	–	23	.281
† 2025 NEC tournament winner * ineligible for the 2025 NCAA tournament due to transition from Division II ** ineligible for both the 2025 NEC tournament and the 2025 NCAA tournament due to transition from Division II

The 2024–25 Central Connecticut Blue Devils men's basketball team represented Central Connecticut State University during the 2024–25 NCAA Division I men's basketball season. The Blue Devils, led by fourth-year head coach Patrick Sellers, played their home games at the William H. Detrick Gymnasium in New Britain, Connecticut as members of the Northeast Conference.

== Previous season ==
The Blue Devils finished the 2023–24 season 20–11, 13–3 in NEC play to finish in a tie for first place. In the NEC tournament, they defeated Saint Francis (PA) in the quarterfinals, before falling to Wagner in the semifinals.

== Preseason polls ==
=== Northeast Conference poll ===
The Northeast Conference released its preseason coaches' poll on October 24, 2024. The Blue Devils were picked to finish in a tie for first place in the conference.

Rank	Team
T-1.	Central Connecticut (5)
T-1.	Wagner (4)
3.	Fairleigh Dickinson
4.	Le Moyne
5.	LIU
6.	Chicago State
7.	Mercyhurst
T-8.	Saint Francis
T-8.	Stonehill

() first-place votes

=== Preseason All-Conference Team ===
Senior guard Jordan Jones was selected as a member of the NEC Preseason All-Conference Team.

== Roster ==
2024–25 Central Connecticut Blue Devils men's basketball team
Players
Coaches

Pos.	#	Name	Height	Weight	Year	Hometown
G	0	Joe Ostrowsky	6 ft 0 in (1.83 m)	175 lb (79 kg)	Sr	Mount Pleasant, Michigan
G	1	Jay Rodgers	6 ft 3 in (1.91 m)	185 lb (84 kg)	Sr	Pickerington, Ohio
G	2	Devin Haid	6 ft 5 in (1.96 m)	190 lb (86 kg)	Jr	Wooster, Ohio
G	3	Davonte Sweatman	5 ft 8 in (1.73 m)	145 lb (66 kg)	Sr	Boston, Massachusetts
F	5	Darin Smith Jr.	6 ft 7 in (2.01 m)	190 lb (86 kg)	RS Fr	Springfield, Massachusetts
F	11	Abdul Momoh	6 ft 7 in (2.01 m)	235 lb (107 kg)	Sr	Carteret, New Jersey
G/F	12	Adam Fox	6 ft 5 in (1.96 m)	185 lb (84 kg)	GS	Silver Spring, Maryland
G	13	Jaelen McGlone	6 ft 4 in (1.93 m)	205 lb (93 kg)	Sr	Cheltenham, Pennsylvania
F	14	Daniele Russo	6 ft 7 in (2.01 m)	215 lb (98 kg)	Jr	Orlando, Florida
F/C	15	Jayden Brown	6 ft 8 in (2.03 m)	215 lb (98 kg)	Jr	Providence, Rhode Island
G	20	DJ Victory	5 ft 8 in (1.73 m)	160 lb (73 kg)	So	Harlem, New York
G	21	Roddy Jones	6 ft 1 in (1.85 m)	195 lb (88 kg)	Fr	North Babylon, New York
F	22	Max Frazier	6 ft 9 in (2.06 m)	200 lb (91 kg)	So	Pittsboro, North Carolina
G	23	Jordan Jones	6 ft 0 in (1.83 m)	180 lb (82 kg)	Sr	Florence, South Carolina
G	24	James Jones	6 ft 6 in (1.98 m)	190 lb (86 kg)	Fr	New Britain, Connecticut
F	44	Brody Limric	6 ft 9 in (2.06 m)	225 lb (102 kg)	Jr	Glastonbury, Connecticut

Head coach

- Patrick Sellers (Central Connecticut State)

Assistant coach(es)

- Ben Wood (Connecticut)
- Lenny Jefferson (Central Connecticut State)
- Ryan Olander (Fairfield)

Legend

- (C) Team captain
- (S) Suspended
- (I) Ineligible
- (W) Walk-on
- Injured
- Current redshirt

Roster
Last update: November 24, 2024

== Schedule and results ==
Date time, TV	Rank^{#}	Opponent^{#}	Result	Record	Site (attendance) city, state
Non-conference regular season
November 4, 2024*; 7:00 pm, FS1		at Providence	L 55–59	0–1	Amica Mutual Pavilion (9,806); Providence, RI
November 8, 2024*; 7:00 pm, ESPN+		at Saint Joseph's	W 73–67	1–1	Hagan Arena (2,124); Philadelphia, PA
November 11, 2024*; 7:00 pm, NEC Front Row		VTSU–Johnson	W 117–68	2–1	William H. Detrick Gymnasium (1,762); New Britain, CT
November 16, 2024*; 6:00 pm, ESPN+		vs. Northeastern; Atlantic Slam	L 62–80	2–2	Avenir Centre (2,173); Moncton, NB
November 21, 2024*; 8:00 pm, ESPN+		at Sacred Heart	L 54–67	2–3	William H. Pitt Center (1,945); Fairfield, CT
November 24, 2024*; 1:00 pm, NEC Front Row		Binghamton	W 64–56	3–3	William H. Detrick Gymnasium (888); New Britain, CT
December 1, 2024*; 1:00 pm, NEC Front Row		UMass Lowell	W 69–67	4–3	William H. Detrick Gymnasium (871); New Britain, CT
December 4, 2024*; 2:00 pm, NESN+		at UMass	W 73–69	5–3	Mullins Center (2,163); Amherst, MA
December 7, 2024*; 2:00 pm, ESPN+		at Holy Cross	W 69–56	6–3	Hart Center (1,002); Worcester, MA
December 15, 2024*; 1:00 pm, ESPN+		at Rhode Island	L 69–77	6–4	Ryan Center (3,842); Kingston, RI
December 18, 2024*; 7:00 pm, ESPN+		at Fairfield	W 64–63	7–4	Leo D. Mahoney Arena (2,058); Fairfield, CT
December 21, 2024*; 1:00 pm, NEC Front Row		Quinnipiac	W 84–80	8–4	William H. Detrick Gymnasium (1,144); New Britain, CT
December 29, 2024*; 1:00 pm, NEC Front Row		Johnson & Wales	W 100–51	9–4	William H. Detrick Gymnasium (739); New Britain, CT
NEC regular season
January 3, 2025; 7:00 pm, NEC Front Row		at Saint Francis	W 74–59	10–4 (1–0)	DeGol Arena (385); Loretto, PA
January 5, 2025; 1:00 pm, NEC Front Row		at Mercyhurst	W 62–50	11–4 (2–0)	Owen McCormick Court (246); Erie, PA
January 10, 2025; 7:00 pm, NEC Front Row		Wagner	L 57–62	11–5 (2–1)	William H. Detrick Gymnasium (1,303); New Britain, CT
January 12, 2025; 1:00 pm, NEC Front Row		LIU	L 52–54	11–6 (2–2)	William H. Detrick Gymnasium (816); New Britain, CT
January 18, 2025; 4:00 pm, YES/NEC Front Row		at Fairleigh Dickinson	W 71–60	12–6 (3–2)	Bogota Savings Bank Center (176); Hackensack, NJ
January 24, 2025; 7:00 pm, NEC Front Row		at Le Moyne	W 93–70	13–6 (4–2)	Ted Grant Court (370); DeWitt, NY
January 26, 2025; 1:00 pm, NEC Front Row		Chicago State	W 81–64	14–6 (5–2)	William H. Detrick Gymnasium (1,126); New Britain, CT
January 30, 2025; 7:00 pm, NEC Front Row		at LIU	W 63–50	15–6 (6–2)	Steinberg Wellness Center (276); Brooklyn, NY
February 1, 2025; 2:00 pm, NEC Front Row		at Stonehill	W 71–63	16–6 (7–2)	Merkert Gymnasium (411); Easton, MA
February 6, 2025; 7:00 pm, ESPN+/NESN+		Fairleigh Dickinson	W 87–66	17–6 (8–2)	William H. Detrick Gymnasium (1,133); New Britain, CT
February 13, 2025; 7:00 pm, NEC Front Row		Mercyhurst	W 73–63	18–6 (9–2)	William H. Detrick Gymnasium (1,042); New Britain, CT
February 15, 2025; 1:00 pm, NEC Front Row		Saint Francis	W 83–67	19–6 (10–2)	William H. Detrick Gymnasium (1,071); New Britain, CT
February 20, 2025; 7:00 pm, NEC Front Row		at Chicago State	W 81–75	20–6 (11–2)	Jones Convocation Center (295); Chicago, IL
February 22, 2025; 4:00 pm, NEC Front Row		Stonehill	W 67–41	21–6 (12–2)	William H. Detrick Gymnasium (1,650); New Britain, CT
February 27, 2025; 7:00 pm, NEC Front Row		Le Moyne	W 84–75	22–6 (13–2)	William H. Detrick Gymnasium (1,008); New Britain, CT
March 1, 2025; 1:00 pm, ESPNU		at Wagner	W 55–48	23–6 (14–2)	Spiro Sports Center (1,702); Staten Island, NY
NEC tournament
March 5, 2025*; 7:00 pm, NEC Front Row	(1)	(8) Le Moyne; Quarterfinals	W 86–67	24–6	William H. Detrick Gymnasium (2,013); New Britain, CT
March 8, 2025*; 2:00 pm, YES/NEC Front Row	(1)	(4) Fairleigh Dickinson; Semifinals	W 76–72 ^{OT}	25–6	William H. Detrick Gymnasium (2,517); New Britain, CT
March 11, 2025*; 7:00 pm, ESPN2	(1)	(3) Saint Francis; Championship	L 43–46	25–7	William H. Detrick Gymnasium (3,204); New Britain, CT
*Non-conference game. ^{#}Rankings from AP Poll. (#) Tournament seedings in parentheses. All times are in Eastern.
