= 2025 Northeast Conference men's basketball tournament =

- Classification: Division I
- Season: 2024–25
- Teams: 8
- Site: Campus sites
- Finals site: William H. Detrick Gymnasium; New Britain, Connecticut
- Champions: Saint Francis (2nd title)
- Winning coach: Rob Krimmel (1st title)
- MVP: Juan Cranford Jr. (Saint Francis)
- Attendance: 10,349 (total); 1,478 (average per game); 3,204 (championship)
- Top scorer: Devin Haid (Central Connecticut) (57 points)
- Television: ESPN2, YES, SNP, NESN+, NESN Nation, ESPN+, NEC Front Row

2024–25 Northeast Conference men's basketball standings
	Conf.				Overall
Team	W		L	PCT	W		L	PCT
Central Connecticut	14	–	2	.875	25	–	7	.781
LIU	12	–	4	.750	17	–	16	.515
Mercyhurst **	9	–	7	.563	15	–	16	.484
Saint Francis †	8	–	8	.500	16	–	18	.471
Fairleigh Dickinson	8	–	8	.500	13	–	20	.394
Stonehill *	7	–	9	.438	15	–	17	.469
Wagner	6	–	10	.375	14	–	16	.467
Chicago State	4	–	12	.250	4	–	28	.125
Le Moyne *	4	–	12	.250	9	–	23	.281
† 2025 NEC tournament winner * ineligible for the 2025 NCAA tournament due to transition from Division II ** ineligible for both the 2025 NEC tournament and the 2025 NCAA tournament due to transition from Division II

The 2025 Northeast Conference Men's Basketball Tournament was the postseason men's basketball tournament for the Northeast Conference for the 2024–25 NCAA Division I men's basketball season. The tournament took place on three dates between March 5 and 11, 2025, and each tournament game was played on the home court of the higher-seeded school.

Wagner was the defending champion, but they were defeated in the quarterfinals.

No. 3 seed Saint Francis defeated no. 1 seed Central Connecticut in the tournament final and received the conference's automatic bid to the 2025 NCAA tournament. It was the first NEC title for St. Francis since 1991. Central Connecticut's last NEC tournament championship was in 2007.

Tournament MVP Juan Cranford Jr. became the fourth player to win the award after being named NEC rookie of the year in the same season.

This was the final men's tournament held under the "Northeast Conference" name. On October 2, 2025, the conference changed its name to its longstanding initialism of NEC.

== Seeds ==
For the third straight year, the NEC changed its rules regarding eligibility for the conference tournament. Effective in 2025, teams transitioning from Division II may participate in the NEC tournament starting with the third year of their transition. Therefore, Mercyhurst will not be eligible for the NEC tournament until 2027. The change was prospective rather than retroactive. Consequently, Le Moyne, in their second transition year, remained eligible for the 2025 tournament. This means the eight conference members other than Mercyhurst participated in the tournament. In 2024, the top eight teams in the conference regular-season standings qualified, and all transitioning NEC teams were eligible for the conference tournament.

Teams were seeded by record within the conference, with a tiebreaker system to seed teams with identical conference records. Although Mercyhurst was ineligible for the tournament, they could still have been involved in a tiebreaker and affected the outcome of a multi-team tie.

Seed	School	Conf.	Tiebreaker
1	Central Connecticut	14–2	
2	LIU	12–4	
3	Saint Francis	8–8	2–0 vs. Fairleigh Dickinson
4	Fairleigh Dickinson	8–8	0–2 vs. Saint Francis
5	Stonehill	7–9	
6	Wagner	6–10	
7	Chicago State	4–12	1–1 vs. LIU
8	Le Moyne	4–12	0–2 vs. LIU
DNQ	Mercyhurst	9–7	

== Schedule ==
Game	Time*	Matchup	Score	Television
Quarterfinals – Wednesday, March 5
1	7:00 p.m.	No. 8 Le Moyne at No. 1 Central Connecticut	67–86	NEC Front Row
2	7:00 p.m.	No. 7 Chicago State at No. 2 LIU	57–68	NEC Front Row
3	7:00 p.m.	No. 6 Wagner at No. 3 Saint Francis	55–58	NEC Front Row
4	7:00 p.m.	No. 5 Stonehill at No. 4 Fairleigh Dickinson	56–71	NEC Front Row
Semifinals – Saturday, March 8
5	12:00 noon	No. 3 Saint Francis at No. 2 LIU	71–68	YES, SNP, NESN+, ESPN+
6	2:00 p.m.	No. 4 Fairleigh Dickinson at No. 1 Central Connecticut	72–76^{OT}	YES, SNP, NESN Nation, ESPN+
Championship – Tuesday, March 11
7	7:00 p.m.	No. 3 Saint Francis at No. 1 Central Connecticut	46–43	ESPN2
*Game times in ET (UTC−5 on March 5 and 8 and UTC−4 on March 11). Rankings denote tournament seed.

== Tournament highlights ==
=== Quarterfinals ===
No. 1 seed Central Connecticut cruised past no. 8 seed Le Moyne, 86–67. Jordan Jones scored 19 points, grabbed five rebounds and dished four assists for the Blue Devils, who won their 12th straight game. Jaelen McGlone finished with 18 points and five rebounds, Devin Haid added 14 points, and Jayden Brown had six points and eight rebounds for Central Connecticut. Dwayne Koroma scored a game-high and career-high 24 points and added seven rebounds and two steals for the Dolphins. AJ Dancler finished with 15 points, seven rebounds and two assists, and Nate Fouts added 13 points, four rebounds, three assists and two steals for Le Moyne.

Malachi Davis exploded for 35 points on 15-for-28 shooting from the floor and added seven rebounds and seven assists to lead no. 2 seed LIU to a 68–57 victory over no. 7 seed Chicago State. The Sharks had a seven-point lead with 15:34 to play, when they went on a 15–1 run to put the game away. Jamal Fuller scored 13 points and grabbed seven rebounds, and Shadrak Lasu finished with 10 points and 12 rebounds for LIU, who won their sixth straight game. Jalen Forrest scored 17 points to lead the Cougars. Gabe Spinelli had 15 points and four assists, and Quincy Allen had 11 points, six rebounds and four blocks for Chicago State.

Riley Parker hit three free throws with two second remaining to break a tie score and lead no. 3 seed Saint Francis to a 58–55 win over no. 6 seed Wagner. Javier Ezquerra's layup with 12 seconds to play had tied the game for the Seahwawks, who trailed by 12 points with less than seven minutes remaining. Earlier in the game, Parker, who finished with 16 points, five rebounds and four steals, hit a halfcourt buzzer-beater after stealing the ball to give the Red Flash a three-point lead at intermission. Valentino Pinedo scored eight points, grabbed 11 boards and dished three assists, Daemar Kelly had 13 points and six rebounds, and Juan Cranford Jr. scored 11 points for Saint Francis. Zaire Williams finished with 16 points, six rebounds and two steals, Zavier Fitch had six points and eight rebounds, and Ja'Kair Sanchez had 14 points for Wagner. Ezquerra finished with nine points, five assists and two steals.

No. 4 seed Fairleigh Dickinson built a 10-point halftime lead over no. 5 seed Stonehill on the strength of 52% first-half shooting from the floor, while holding the Skyhawks to 29.6%. Stonehill's shooting heated up in the second half, and they got within two points with 10:13 to play, but a late 9–1 run put away a 71–56 win for the Knights. Terrence Brown scored 23 points, grabbed five rebounds and handed out six assists for Fairleigh Dickinson. Bismark Nsiah added 12 points and three steals, Jameel Morris had five rebounds and three steals, and Jo'el Emanuel scored 11 points and grabbed five rebounds for the Knights. Louie Semona had 15 points, two assists and two steals, and Todd Brogna finished with 13 points, 10 rebounds and two assists for the Skyhawks.

=== Semifinals ===
Juan Cranford Jr. led no. 3 seed Saint Francis in a second-half comeback that erased a 15-point deficit, and the Red Flash defeated no. 2 seed LIU, 71-68. Jamal Fuller scored 17 first-half points for the Sharks, who controlled the first half and led, 38–23, at the break. However, Saint Francis scored the first seven points of the second half to cut the deficit to eight points. A 13–1 run gave the Red Flash a five-point lead with 11:49 to play. Malachi Davis, who scored all 16 of his points in the second half, provided the response for the Sharks, leading them on a 20–10 spurt that put them in front, 67–62, with 2:59 remaining. However, LIU would not score a basket the rest of the way, as Saint Francis closed the game on a 9–1 run. Cranford was fouled with 1.4 seconds to play and the score tied at 68, and he hit three free throws. The Sharks inbounded the ball, and it was deflected out of bounds in the frontcourt. LIU inbounded again, but Blake Lander's three-point attempt at the buzzer missed. Cranford finished with 20 points, 17 of them in the second half. Chris Moncrief had 15 points, and Riley Parker added 13 points for the Red Flash. Fuller finished with 21 points and seven rebounds, and Lander scored 13 for the Sharks. The loss ended LIU's seven-game winning streak.

No. 1 seed Central Connecticut needed overtime to get past no. 4 seed Fairleigh Dickinson, after the Knights staged a second-half rally to overcome a 17-point halftime deficit. The Blue Devils hit nine triples and got 17 points from Devin Haid to build their lead at the break. Central Connecticut pushed their lead to 21 points with less than 15 minutes to play, but their offense went cold, and Fairleigh Dickinson slowly eroded the Blue Devils' lead. After Jameel Morris hit a three-pointer with 1:22 remaining, the Knights were down by only two points. Terrence Brown's jump shot with 18 seconds left tied the score for Fairleigh Dickinson. Joe Ostrowsky had the last shot of regulation for Central Connecticut, but his jump shot was off the mark. A pair of free throws by Abdul Momoh gave the Blue Devils an early lead in overtime. Jordan Jones had six points, all of them on free throws, in overtime for Central Connecticut, who led throughout the extra session. In the closing seconds with the Blue Devils leading by two points, Jones intercepted a backdoor pass and hit two free throws to seal Central Connecticut's 76–72 victory. Haid finished with a career-high 29 points, shooting 12 for 16 from the floor and 4 for 6 from three-point range, five rebounds, three assists and four steals. Jones had 17 points and three steals. Jo'el Emanuel had 17 points, eight rebounds and two blocks, and Brown recorded 16 points, six rebounds and three steals for the Knights. Bismark Nsiah had 15 points, nine rebounds, three steals and two blocks for Fairleigh Dickinson. The Blue Devils' victory extended their winning streak to 14 games, the longest current streak in Division I.

=== Final ===
Neither team led by more than four points in the NEC final. No. 3 seed Saint Francis held a 43–41 edge, until Joe Ostrowsky drove to the basket for a layup to tie the score for no. 1 seed Central Connecticut with 17 seconds to play. Saint Francis responded with a Daemar Kelly jump shot that gave them a 45–43 lead with eight seconds remaining. Chris Moncrief then stole the ball from Devin Haid, before the Blue Devils could get off a shot, and was fouled with 1.6 seconds left. Moncrief hit one free throw to stretch the Red Flash's lead to three points. Haid tried a deep three-pointer at the buzzer that bounded off the rim, giving Saint Francis a 46–43 victory and their first NEC tournament title since 1991. It was the first NEC tournament championship for head coach Rob Krimmel, who earned his first trip to the NCAA tournament. Tournament MVP Juan Cranford Jr. became the fourth player to win the award after being named NEC rookie of the year in the same season. Cranford scored 14 points to lead the Red Flash. Kelly finished with six points, seven rebounds and three assists. Haid scored 14 points, and Abdul Momoh had six points and 11 rebounds for the Blue Devils, who saw their 14-game winning streak, the longest active streak in Division I, come to an end.

== Bracket ==
Teams were reseeded after each round with the highest remaining seeds receiving home-court advantage.

Quarterfinals; Wednesday, March 5 NEC Front Row
1	Central Connecticut	86
8	Le Moyne	67
4	Fairleigh Dickinson	71
5	Stonehill	56
Pairings are reseeded after the quarterfinals.
2	LIU	68
7	Chicago State	57
3	Saint Francis	58
6	Wagner	55

Semifinals; Saturday, March 8 YES/SNP/NESN+/NESN Nation/ESPN+
1	Central Connecticut	76^{OT}
4	Fairleigh Dickinson	72
2	LIU	68
3	Saint Francis	71

Championship; Tuesday, March 11; ESPN2
1	Central Connecticut	43
3	Saint Francis	46

== Game summaries ==
All times are in Eastern Time (UTC−5 on March 5 and 8 and UTC−4 on March 11)

=== Quarterfinals ===
NEC Front Row

March 5
7:00 p.m.

Box

No. 8 Le Moyne 67, No. 1 Central Connecticut 86
Scoring by half: 35–51, 32–35
Pts: Koroma 24; Rebs: Dancler, Koroma 7 Asts: Amica, Fouts 3	Pts: Jo. Jones 19; Rebs: Brown 6 Asts: Jo. Jones 4
Central Connecticut advances to NEC semifinals

William H. Detrick Gymnasium
New Britain, Connecticut
Attendance: 2,013
Referees: Josh Burton, John Cahill Jr., Tommy Deneen

NEC Front Row

March 5
7:00 p.m.

Box

No. 7 Chicago State 57, No. 2 LIU 68
Scoring by half: 28–36, 29–32
Pts: Forrest 17; Rebs: Allen 6 Asts: G. Spinelli 4	Pts: M. Davis 35; Rebs: Lasu 12; Asts: M. Davis 7
LIU advances to NEC semifinals

Steinberg Wellness Center
Brooklyn, New York
Attendance: 278
Referees: Phil Salusitio, Mike Nardone, Mike McClusky

NEC Front Row

March 5
7:00 p.m.

Box

No. 6 Wagner 55, No. 3 Saint Francis 58
Scoring by half: 25–28, 30–30
Pts: Williams 16; Rebs: Fitch 8 Asts: Ezquerra 5	Pts: Parker 16; Rebs: Pinedo 11; Asts: Pinedo 3
Saint Francis advances to NEC semifinals

DeGol Arena
Loretto, Pennsylvania
Attendance: 724
Referees: Brandon Kamil, Sean Campbell, Greg Moyer

NEC Front Row

March 5
7:00 p.m.

Box

No. 5 Stonehill 56, No. 4 Fairleigh Dickinson 71
Scoring by half: 20–30, 36–41
Pts: Semona 15; Rebs: Brogna 10; Asts: Nesbitt 3	Pts: Brown 23; Rebs: Brown, Emanuel, Morris 5 Asts: Brown 6
Fairleigh Dickinson advances to NEC semifinals

Bogota Savings Bank Center
Hackensack, New Jersey
Attendance: 1,000
Referees: Dave Powell, Dan Basile, Vasili Mallios

=== Semifinals ===
YES, SNP, NESN+, ESPN+

March 8
12:00 noon

Box

No. 3 Saint Francis 71, No. 2 LIU 68
Scoring by half: 23–38, 48–30
Pts: Cranford 20; Rebs: Moncrief 4 Asts: Parker 3	Pts: Fuller 21; Rebs: Fuller, Lasu 7 Asts: Strickland 6
Saint Francis advances to NEC championship

Steinberg Wellness Center
Brooklyn, New York
Attendance: 613
Referees: Craig Lastres, Doug Aprahamian, Steven Ruppenthal

YES, SNP, NESN Nation, ESPN+

March 8
2:00 p.m.

Box

No. 4 Fairleigh Dickinson 72, No. 1 Central Connecticut 76 (OT)
Scoring by half: 24–41, 42–25 Overtime: 6–10
Pts: Emanuel 17; Rebs: Nsiah 9 Asts: Brown, Emanuel, Morris 3	Pts: Haid 29; Rebs: Momoh 6 Asts: Momoh, Ostrowski 4
Central Connecticut advances to NEC championship

William H. Detrick Gymnasium
New Britain, Connecticut
Attendance: 2,517
Referees: Jim Ostwalt, Raymond Downs, Guy Pagano

=== Final ===
ESPN2

March 11
7:00 pm

Box

No. 3 Saint Francis 46, No. 1 Central Connecticut 43
Scoring by half: 20–20, 26–23
Pts: Cranford 14; Rebs: Kelly 7 Asts: Kelly 3	Pts: Haid 14; Rebs: Momoh 11; Asts: Jo. Jones 2
Saint Francis wins NEC championship

William H. Detrick Gymnasium
New Britain, Connecticut
Attendance: 3,204
Referees: Edward Corbett Jr., Mikerlange Fleury, Brandon Cruz

== Awards and honors ==
2025 Northeast Conference Men's Basketball All-Tournament Team
- Juan Cranford Jr., Saint Francis (MVP)
- Riley Parker, Saint Francis
- Devin Haid, Central Connecticut
- Terrence Brown, Fairleigh Dickinson
- Malachi Davis, LIU

== Statistics ==
Individual scoring
Rk	Player	School	G	Pts	PPG
1	Malachi Davis	LIU	2	51	25.5
2	Dwayne Koroma	Le Moyne	1	24	24.0
3	Terrence Brown	Fairleigh Dickinson	2	39	19.5
4	Devin Haid	Central Connecticut	3	57	19.0
5	Jamal Fuller	LIU	2	34	17.0
5	Jalen Forrest	Chicago State	1	17	17.0
7	Zaire Williams	Wagner	1	16	16.0
8	Juan Cranford Jr.	Saint Francis	3	45	15.0
8	Louie Semona	Stonehill	1	15	15.0
8	Gabe Spinelli	Chicago State	1	15	15.0
8	AJ Dancler	Sacred Heart	1	15	15.0

Individual field-goal percentage
Rk	Player	Team	G	FGM	FGA	FG%
1	Dwayne Koroma	Le Moyne	1	10	12	83.3%
2	Will Amica	Le Moyne	1	3	4	75.0%
3	Todd Brogna	Stonehill	1	5	7	71.4%
4	Bismark Nsiah	Fairleigh Dickinson	2	11	16	68.8%
5	Gabe Spinelli	Chicago State	1	5	9	55.6%
6	Valentino Pinedo	Saint Francis	3	12	22	54.5%
6	Jamal Fuller	LIU	2	12	22	54.5%
8	Jaelen McGlone	Central Connecticut	3	9	17	52.9%
9	Devin Haid	Central Connecticut	3	21	40	52.5%
10	Jo'el Emanuel	Fairleigh Dickinson	2	10	21	47.6%

Individual three-point field-goal percentage
Rk	Player	Team	G	3FGM	3FGA	3FG%
1	Gabe Spinelli	Chicago State	1	1	1	100.0%
2	Darin Smith Jr.	Central Connecticut	3	4	7	57.1%
3	Jaelen McGlone	Central Connecticut	3	6	12	50.0%
3	Zaire Williams	Wagner	1	3	6	50.0%
3	Nate Fouts	Le Moyne	1	2	4	50.0%
3	Matthew Robinson	Chicago State	1	2	4	50.0%
7	Jo'el Emanuel	Fairleigh Dickinson	2	5	11	45.5%
8	Riley Parker	Saint Francis	3	7	16	43.8%
9	Ethan Meuser	Stonehill	1	3	7	42.9%
10	Jalen Forrest	Chicago State	1	2	5	40.0%
10	Darrick Jones Jr.	Le Moyne	1	2	5	40.0%

Individual free-throw percentage
Rk	Player	Team	G	FTM	FTA	FT%
1	Jordan Jones	Central Connecticut	3	10	10	100.0%
1	Juan Cranford Jr.	Saint Francis	3	6	6	100.0%
1	Ja'Kair Sanchez	Wagner	1	6	6	100.0%
1	Riley Parker	Saint Francis	3	6	6	100.0%
1	Gabe Spinelli	Chicago State	1	4	4	100.0%
1	Zavier Fitch	Wagner	1	2	2	100.0%
1	Noble Crawford	Chicago State	1	2	2	100.0%
1	Keyontae Lewis	Wagner	1	2	2	100.0%
9	Terrence Brown	Fairleigh Dickinson	2	8	9	88.9%
10	Jamal Fuller	LIU	2	7	8	87.5%
11	Malachi Davis	LIU	2	6	7	85.7%
11	Davonte Sweatman	Central Connecticut	3	6	7	85.7%
13	Devin Haid	Central Connecticut	3	10	12	83.3%

Individual rebounding
Rk	Player	Team	G	ORB	DRB	Tot	RPG
1	Todd Brogna	Stonehill	1	3	7	10	10.0
2	Shadrak Lasu	LIU	2	10	9	19	9.5
3	Zavier Fitch	Wagner	1	4	4	8	8.0
3	Chas Stinson	Stonehill	1	4	4	8	8.0
5	Abdul Momoh	Central Connecticut	3	7	14	21	7.0
5	Brent Davis	LIU	2	8	6	14	7.0
5	Jamal Fuller	LIU	2	5	9	14	7.0
5	AJ Dancler	Le Moyne	1	1	6	7	7.0
5	Dwayne Koroma	Le Moyne	1	2	5	7	7.0
10	Jo'el Emanuel	Fairleigh Dickinson	2	4	9	13	6.5
10	Bismark Nsiah	Fairleigh Dickinson	2	6	7	13	6.5
12	Valentino Pinedo	Saint Francis	3	6	12	18	6.0
12	Quincy Allen	Chicago State	1	2	4	6	6.0
12	Zaire Williams	Wagner	1	2	4	6	6.0
15	Terrence Brown	Fairleigh Dickinson	2	1	10	11	5.5
16	Daemar Kelly	Saint Francis	3	0	15	15	5.0
16	Ja'Kair Sanchez	Wagner	1	2	3	5	5.0
16	Churchill Bounds	Wagner	1	3	2	5	5.0
16	Ethan Meuser	Stonehill	1	2	3	5	5.0
16	Ocypher Owens	Le Moyne	1	3	2	5	5.0

Individual assists
Rk	Player	Team	G	A	APG
1	Javier Ezquerra	Wagner	1	5	5.0
2	Terrence Brown	Fairleigh Dickinson	2	9	4.5
3	Gabe Spinelli	Chicago State	1	4	4.0
4	Malachi Davis	LIU	2	7	3.5
5	Will Amica	Le Moyne	1	3	3.0
5	Matthew Robinson	Chicago State	1	3	3.0
5	Amir Nesbitt	Stonehill	1	3	3.0
5	Nate Fouts	Le Moyne	1	3	3.0
9	Joe Ostrowsky	Central Connecticut	3	8	2.7
10	Bismark Nsiah	Fairleigh Dickinson	2	5	2.5
10	Jameel Morris	Fairleigh Dickinson	2	5	2.5

Individual blocks
Rk	Player	Team	G	Blk	BPG
1	Quincy Allen	Chicago State	1	4	4.0
2	Shadrak Lasu	LIU	2	5	2.5
3	Noble Crawford	Chicago State	1	2	2.0
3	Ethan Meuser	Stonehill	1	2	2.0
5	Jayden Brown	Central Connecticut	3	5	1.7
5	Abdul Momoh	Central Connecticut	3	5	1.7
7	Valentino Pinedo	Saint Francis	3	3	1.0
7	Chidube Ekwommadu	Fairleigh Dickinson	2	2	1.0
7	Bismark Nsiah	Fairleigh Dickinson	2	2	1.0
7	Jo'el Emanuel	Fairleigh Dickinson	2	2	1.0
7	Brent Davis	LIU	2	2	1.0
7	Matthew Robinson	Chicago State	1	1	1.0
7	Darrick Jones Jr.	Le Moyne	1	1	1.0

Individual steals
Rk	Player	Team	G	Stl	SPG
1	Bismark Nsiah	Fairleigh Dickinson	2	6	3.0
2	Terrence Brown	Fairleigh Dickinson	2	5	2.5
3	Devin Haid	Central Connecticut	3	7	2.3
4	Brent Davis	LIU	2	4	2.0
4	Blake Lamder	LIU	2	4	2.0
4	Zavier Fitch	Wagner	1	2	2.0
4	Dwayne Koroma	Le Moyne	1	2	2.0
4	Javier Ezquerra	Wagner	1	2	2.0
4	Louie Semona	Stonehill	1	2	2.0
4	Zae Blake	Wagner	1	2	2.0
4	Nate Fouts	Le Moyne	1	2	2.0
4	Zaire Williams	Wagner	1	2	2.0
4	Chas Stinson	Stonehill	1	2	2.0

== Media coverage ==
YES and SportsNet Pittsburgh televised both conference tournament semifinal games. The semifinal game between Saint Francis and LIU was broadcast by NESN+, and the Fairleigh Dickinson–Central Connecticut semifinal game was streamed by NESN Nation. Simulcasts of both conference tournament semifinal games were streamed by ESPN+. The conference tournament final was televised by ESPN2. The conference tournament quarterfinal games were streamed by NEC Front Row, the conference's streaming platform.

YES initially advised that it may show the conference semifinal games on tape delay, if they conflicted with New York Yankees spring training games. The Yankees had a spring training road game at 6 p.m. on March 8, that was not televised by YES, which broadcast both NEC semifinal games live.

The 2025 NEC tournament final marked the 38th consecutive year that the conference's championship game was broadcast on linear television by an ESPN network.

== See also ==
2025 Northeast Conference women's basketball tournament
