= 2024–25 Saint Francis Red Flash men's basketball team =

American college basketball season

2024–25 Saint Francis Red Flash men's basketball

NEC tournament champions

NCAA tournament, First Four
- Conference: Northeast Conference
- Record: 16–18 (8–8 NEC)
- Head coach: Rob Krimmel (13th season)
- Associate head coach: Luke McConnell
- Assistant coaches: Oliver Allen; Devin Sweetney
- Home arena: DeGol Arena

2024–25 Northeast Conference men's basketball standings
	Conf.				Overall
Team	W		L	PCT	W		L	PCT
Central Connecticut	14	–	2	.875	25	–	7	.781
LIU	12	–	4	.750	17	–	16	.515
Mercyhurst **	9	–	7	.563	15	–	16	.484
Saint Francis †	8	–	8	.500	16	–	18	.471
Fairleigh Dickinson	8	–	8	.500	13	–	20	.394
Stonehill *	7	–	9	.438	15	–	17	.469
Wagner	6	–	10	.375	14	–	16	.467
Chicago State	4	–	12	.250	4	–	28	.125
Le Moyne *	4	–	12	.250	9	–	23	.281
† 2025 NEC tournament winner * ineligible for the 2025 NCAA tournament due to transition from Division II ** ineligible for both the 2025 NEC tournament and the 2025 NCAA tournament due to transition from Division II

The 2024–25 Saint Francis Red Flash men's basketball team represented Saint Francis University during the 2024–25 NCAA Division I men's basketball season. The Red Flash, led by 13th-year head coach Rob Krimmel, played their home games at the DeGol Arena in Loretto, Pennsylvania as members of the Northeast Conference.

== Previous season ==
The Red Flash finished the 2023–24 season 8–21, 3–13 in NEC play to finish in eighth place. They were defeated by Central Connecticut in the quarterfinals of the NEC tournament,

== Preseason polls ==
=== Northeast Conference poll ===
The Northeast Conference released its preseason coaches' poll on October 24, 2024. The Red Flash were picked to finish tied for last in the conference.

Rank	Team
T-1.	Central Connecticut (5)
T-1.	Wagner (4)
3.	Fairleigh Dickinson
4.	Le Moyne
5.	LIU
6.	Chicago State
7.	Mercyhurst
T-8.	Saint Francis
T-8.	Stonehill

() first-place votes

=== Preseason All-Conference Team ===
No Red Flashes were selected as members of the NEC Preseason All-Conference Team.

== Roster ==
2024–25 Saint Francis Red Flash men's basketball team
Players
Coaches

Pos.	#	Name	Height	Weight	Year	Previous school	Hometown
G	0	Chris Moncrief	6 ft 6 in (1.98 m)	190 lb (86 kg)	Jr	Evansville	Turtle Creek, Pennsylvania
G	1	KJ Swain Jr.	6 ft 0 in (1.83 m)	155 lb (70 kg)	Jr	Cincinnati Christian Schools	Hamilton, Ohio
G	2	Aaron "Ace" Talbert	6 ft 0 in (1.83 m)	185 lb (84 kg)	So	Combine Academy	Wyandanch, New York
F	3	Miles Webb	6 ft 8 in (2.03 m)	190 lb (86 kg)	Jr	St. Stephen's & St. Agnes School	Arlington, Virginia
G	4	Juan Cranford Jr.	6 ft 3 in (1.91 m)	205 lb (93 kg)	Fr	Wayne High School	Dayton, Ohio
G	5	Daemar Kelly	6 ft 5 in (1.96 m)	195 lb (88 kg)	So	Quinnipiac	Pittsburgh, Pennsylvania
G	7	Jeremy Clayville	6 ft 0 in (1.83 m)	165 lb (75 kg)	Fr	St. Joseph High School	Ridgewood, New Jersey
G	11	Riley Parker	6 ft 2 in (1.88 m)	195 lb (88 kg)	Jr	Cochise College	Mandurah, Australia
G	13	Blaze Angellotti	6 ft 4 in (1.93 m)	195 lb (88 kg)	So	Bald Eagle Area High School	Julian, Pennsylvania
G	14	Bobby Rosenberger III	6 ft 5 in (1.96 m)	205 lb (93 kg)	So	Perkiomen School	Quakertown, Pennsylvania
G	15	Victor Payne	6 ft 4 in (1.93 m)	190 lb (86 kg)	Fr	Cromwell High School	Cromwell, Connecticut
G	20	Brendan Scanlon	5 ft 8 in (1.73 m)	175 lb (79 kg)	Sr	Saint Joseph's	State College, Pennsylvania
F	21	Gestin Liberis	6 ft 9 in (2.06 m)	215 lb (98 kg)	Jr	George School	Havertown, Pennsylvania
G	22	Ryen Gresko	5 ft 11 in (1.8 m)	170 lb (77 kg)	So	Penns Manor High School	Penn Run, Pennsylvania
G	23	Wisler Sanon II	6 ft 4 in (1.93 m)	190 lb (86 kg)	Jr	Paul VI High School	Sicklerville, New Jersey
G	24	Carson Rhodes	6 ft 3 in (1.91 m)	180 lb (82 kg)	Fr	Hollidaysburg Area High School	Hollidaysburg, Pennsylvania
G	30	Trey Weiand	6 ft 4 in (1.93 m)	200 lb (91 kg)	So	Trinity High School	Mechanicsburg, Pennsylvania
F	31	Valentino Pinedo	6 ft 8 in (2.03 m)	230 lb (104 kg)	Jr	East Carolina	Murcia, Spain
F	32	Aidan Harris	6 ft 7 in (2.01 m)	205 lb (93 kg)	So	St. Mary's High School	Annapolis, Maryland
G	33	Zachary Jones	6 ft 0 in (1.83 m)	145 lb (66 kg)	Fr	Indian Hill High School	Cincinnati, Ohio

Head coach

- Rob Krimmel (Saint Francis (PA))

Assistant coach(es)

- Luke McConnell (Saint Francis (PA))
- Oliver Allen (Vermont)
- Devin Sweetney (Saint Francis (PA))

Legend

- (C) Team captain
- (S) Suspended
- (I) Ineligible
- (W) Walk-on
- Injured
- Current redshirt

Roster
Last update: November 21, 2024

== Schedule and results ==
Date time, TV	Rank^{#}	Opponent^{#}	Result	Record	Site (attendance) city, state
Non-conference regular season
November 4, 2024*; 7:00 pm, ESPN+		at Dayton	L 57–87	0–1	UD Arena (13,407); Dayton, OH
November 8, 2024*; 7:00 pm, ACCNX/ESPN+		at Clemson	L 62–88	0–2	Littlejohn Coliseum (7,571); Clemson, SC
November 10, 2024*; 2:00 pm, FloHoops		at Campbell	W 65–64	1–2	Gore Arena (1,069); Buies Creek, NC
November 12, 2024*; 7:00 pm, B1G		at Penn State	L 62–92	1–3	Bryce Jordan Center (6,626); University Park, PA
November 16, 2024*; 7:00 pm, ESPN+		at Mount St. Mary's; Georgetown MTE	L 58–66	1–4	Knott Arena (2,133); Emmitsburg, MD
November 20, 2024*; 7:00 pm, NEC Front Row		Penn State Schuylkill	W 96–57	2–4	DeGol Arena (886); Loretto, PA
November 23, 2024*; 12:00 pm, FS2		at Georgetown; Georgetown MTE	L 65–82	2–5	Capital One Arena (3,192); Washington, DC
November 26, 2024*; 7:00 pm, NEC Front Row		Lehigh	W 88–78	3–5	DeGol Arena (846); Loretto, PA
December 1, 2024*; 2:00 pm, NEC Front Row		Radford	L 70–79	3–6	DeGol Arena (672); Loretto, PA
December 4, 2024*; 7:00 pm, ESPN+		Penn State Shenango	W 107–55	4–6	DeGol Arena (759); Loretto, PA
December 14, 2024*; 6:00 pm, ESPN+		at Niagara	L 66–69	4–7	Gallagher Center (738); Lewiston, NY
December 17, 2023*; 7:30 pm, B1G		at Maryland	L 57–111	4–8	Xfinity Center (10,555); College Park, MD
December 19, 2024*; 7:00 pm, NEC Front Row		Franciscan	W 104–47	5–8	DeGol Arena (333); Loretto, PA
December 21, 2024*; 1:00 pm, ESPN+		at Robert Morris	L 77–90	5–9	UPMC Events Center (832); Moon Township, PA
NEC regular season
January 3, 2025; 7:00 pm, NEC Front Row		Central Connecticut	L 59–74	5–10 (0–1)	DeGol Arena (385); Loretto, PA
January 5, 2025; 2:00 pm, NEC Front Row		Stonehill	L 60–64	5–11 (0–2)	DeGol Arena (407); Loretto, PA
January 10, 2025; 7:00 pm, NEC Front Row		Mercyhurst	W 73–59	6–11 (1–2)	DeGol Arena (665); Loretto, PA
January 12, 2025; 1:00 pm, NEC Front Row		at Fairleigh Dickinson	W 75–71	7–11 (2–2)	Bogota Savings Bank Center (753); Hackensack, NJ
January 18, 2025; 7:00 pm, NEC Front Row		at LIU	L 51–64	7–12 (2–3)	Steinberg Wellness Center (304); Brooklyn, NY
January 20, 2025; 1:00 pm, NEC Front Row		at Wagner	L 68–70 ^{2OT}	7–13 (2–4)	Spiro Sports Center (250); Staten Island, NY
January 24, 2025; 7:00 pm, NEC Front Row		LIU	W 74–64	8–13 (3–4)	DeGol Arena (969); Loretto, PA
January 26, 2025; 4:00 pm, NEC Front Row		Wagner	L 66–68	8–14 (3–5)	DeGol Arena (1,017); Loretto, PA
January 30, 2025; 7:00 pm, NEC Front Row		at Mercyhurst	L 58–62	8–15 (3–6)	Owen McCormick Court (755); Erie, PA
February 6, 2025; 7:00 pm, NEC Front Row		Le Moyne	W 86–78	9–15 (4–6)	DeGol Arena (992); Loretto, PA
February 8, 2025; 2:00 pm, ESPN+		at Chicago State	W 81–69	10–15 (5–6)	Jones Convocation Center (275); Chicago, IL
February 13, 2025; 7:00 pm, NEC Front Row		at Stonehill	L 74–79	10–16 (5–7)	Merkert Gymnasium (727); Easton, MA
February 15, 2025; 1:00 pm, NEC Front Row		at Central Connecticut	L 67–83	10–17 (5–8)	William H. Detrick Gymnasium (1,071); New Britain, CT
February 20, 2025; 7:00 pm, NEC Front Row		at Le Moyne	W 81–76 ^{OT}	11–17 (6–8)	Ted Grant Court (481); DeWitt, NY
February 22, 2025; 2:00 pm, NEC Front Row		Fairleigh Dickinson	W 85–80 ^{OT}	12–17 (7–8)	DeGol Arena; Loretto, PA
March 1, 2025; 2:00 pm, NEC Front Row		Chicago State	W 80–71 ^{OT}	13–17 (8–8)	DeGol Arena (899); Loretto, PA
NEC Tournament
March 5, 2025; 7:00 pm, NEC Front Row	(3)	(6) Wagner; Quarterfinals	W 58–55	14–17	DeGol Arena (724); Loretto, PA
March 8, 2025; 12:00 pm, ESPN+	(3)	at (2) LIU; Semifinals	W 71–68	15–17	Steinberg Wellness Center (613); Brooklyn, NY
March 11, 2025; 7:00 pm, ESPN2	(3)	at (1) Central Connecticut; Championship	W 46–43	16–17	William H. Detrick Gymnasium (3,204); New Britain, CT
NCAA Tournament
March 18, 2025*; 6:40 pm, TruTV	(16 S)	vs. (16 S) Alabama State; First Four	L 68–70	16–18	UD Arena; Dayton, OH
*Non-conference game. ^{#}Rankings from AP Poll. (#) Tournament seedings in parentheses. S=South. All times are in Eastern.
