= 2024–25 Fairleigh Dickinson Knights men's basketball team =

American college basketball season

2024–25 Fairleigh Dickinson Knights men's basketball
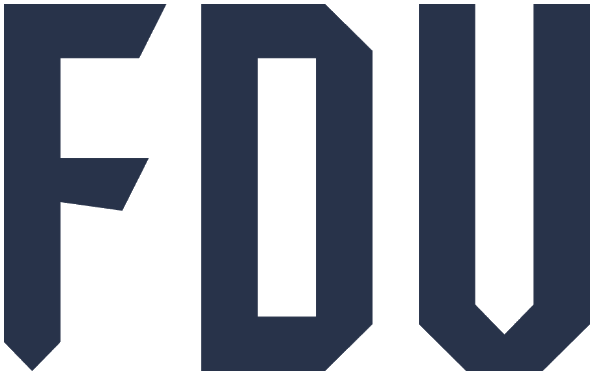
- Conference: Northeast Conference
- Record: 13–20 (8–8 NEC)
- Head coach: Jack Castleberry (2nd season)
- Assistant coaches: Josh Hayes; Tom Kiely; Nick Battle
- Home arena: Bogota Savings Bank Center

2024–25 Northeast Conference men's basketball standings
	Conf.				Overall
Team	W		L	PCT	W		L	PCT
Central Connecticut	14	–	2	.875	25	–	7	.781
LIU	12	–	4	.750	17	–	16	.515
Mercyhurst **	9	–	7	.563	15	–	16	.484
Saint Francis †	8	–	8	.500	16	–	18	.471
Fairleigh Dickinson	8	–	8	.500	13	–	20	.394
Stonehill *	7	–	9	.438	15	–	17	.469
Wagner	6	–	10	.375	14	–	16	.467
Chicago State	4	–	12	.250	4	–	28	.125
Le Moyne *	4	–	12	.250	9	–	23	.281
† 2025 NEC tournament winner * ineligible for the 2025 NCAA tournament due to transition from Division II ** ineligible for both the 2025 NEC tournament and the 2025 NCAA tournament due to transition from Division II

The 2024–25 Fairleigh Dickinson Knights men's basketball team represented Fairleigh Dickinson University during the 2024–25 NCAA Division I men's basketball season. The Knights, led by second-year head coach Jack Castleberry, played their home games at the Bogota Savings Bank Center in Hackensack, New Jersey, as members of the Northeast Conference.

== Previous season ==
The Knights finished the 2023–24 season 15–17, 9–7 in NEC play to finish in a tie for fourth place. They were defeated by Le Moyne in the quarterfinals of the NEC tournament.

== Preseason polls ==
=== Northeast Conference poll ===
The Northeast Conference released its preseason coaches' poll on October 24, 2024. The Knights were picked to finish in third in the conference.

Rank	Team
T-1.	Central Connecticut (5)
T-1.	Wagner (4)
3.	Fairleigh Dickinson
4.	Le Moyne
5.	LIU
6.	Chicago State
7.	Mercyhurst
T-8.	Saint Francis
T-8.	Stonehill

() first-place votes

=== Preseason All-Conference Team ===
Junior forward Jo'el Emanuel was selected as a member of the NEC Preseason All-Conference Team.

== Roster ==
2024–25 Fairleigh Dickinson Knights men's basketball team
Players
Coaches

Pos.	#	Name	Height	Weight	Year	Previous school	Hometown
G	0	Brashon Hall	6 ft 1 in (1.85 m)	180 lb (82 kg)	Sr	Drake	Roswell, Georgia
G	1	Jameel Morris	6 ft 1 in (1.85 m)	185 lb (84 kg)	So	Our Saviour Lutheran School	Willingboro, New Jersey
G	2	Terrence Brown	6 ft 3 in (1.91 m)	175 lb (79 kg)	So	Golden State Prep	Minneapolis, Minnesota
G	3	Raysean Johnson	6 ft 1 in (1.85 m)	180 lb (82 kg)	Fr	Canterbury School	Montgomery, New York
G	5	Chidube Ekwommadu	6 ft 4 in (1.93 m)	195 lb (88 kg)	Fr	Fort Erie International Academy	Mississauga, Ontario
F	7	Bismark Nsiah	6 ft 8 in (2.03 m)	220 lb (100 kg)	GS	Jefferson	Bronx, New York
G	8	Ahmed Barba-Bey	6 ft 3 in (1.91 m)	185 lb (84 kg)	GS	Jefferson	Piscataway, New Jersey
F	13	Jo'el Emanuel	6 ft 6 in (1.98 m)	205 lb (93 kg)	Jr	Millbrook School	Suffern, New York
F	14	Davin Francis	6 ft 6 in (1.98 m)	174 lb (79 kg)	So	MacDuffie School	Brooklyn, New York
G	15	Josiah Francis	6 ft 7 in (2.01 m)	200 lb (91 kg)	Fr	United Scholastic Academy	Scarborough, Ontario
G	20	Dylan Jones	6 ft 5 in (1.96 m)	190 lb (86 kg)	Jr	Snow College	Saratoga Springs, Utah
F	21	Cameron Tweedy	6 ft 6 in (1.98 m)	220 lb (100 kg)	Sr	State Fair Community College	Waldorf, Maryland
G	24	Brayden Reynolds	6 ft 1 in (1.85 m)	190 lb (86 kg)	Jr	Western Reserve Academy	Pittsburgh, Pennsylvania
G	30	Andrew Canda	6 ft 0 in (1.83 m)	155 lb (70 kg)	Fr	Virginia Academy	Woodbridge, Virginia
C	35	Jacob Warren	6 ft 10 in (2.08 m)	210 lb (95 kg)	So	Calvary Christian Academy	Downingtown, Pennsylvania

Head coach

- Jack Castleberry (VMI)

Assistant coach(es)

- Josh Hayes (Methodist)
- Tom Kiely (Seton Hall)
- Nick Battle (Rowan)

Legend

- (C) Team captain
- (S) Suspended
- (I) Ineligible
- (W) Walk-on
- Injured
- Current redshirt

Roster
Last update: November 26, 2024

== Schedule and results ==
Date time, TV	Rank^{#}	Opponent^{#}	Result	Record	Site (attendance) city, state
Non-conference regular season
November 4, 2024*; 7:00 pm, ACCNX/ESPN+		at Miami (FL)	L 72–113	0–1	Watsco Center (5,550); Coral Gables, FL
November 7, 2024*; 7:00 pm, NEC Front Row		Purchase	W 112–72	1–1	Bogota Savings Bank Center (375); Hackensack, NJ
November 10, 2024*; 5:00 pm, FS1		at No. 15 Creighton	L 70–96	1–2	CHI Health Center Omaha (16,741); Omaha, NE
November 13, 2024*; 8:00 pm, B1G+		at Nebraska	L 60–86	1–3	Pinnacle Bank Arena (14,473); Lincoln, NE
November 17, 2024*; 2:00 pm, NEC Front Row		Manhattan; Metro NY/NJ Classic	W 85–82	2–3	Bogota Savings Bank Center (2,498); Hackensack, NJ
November 20, 2024*; 7:00 pm, ESPN+		at Army; Metro NY/NJ Classic	L 70–84	2–4	Christl Arena (750); West Point, NY
November 22, 2024*; 11:00 am, NEC Front Row		Vermont State Randolph	W 107–58	3–4	Bogota Savings Bank Center (1,076); Hackensack, NJ
November 26, 2024*; 7:00 pm, YES		Saint Peter's	L 76–78	3–5	Bogota Savings Bank Center (1,056); Hackensack, NJ
December 1, 2024*; 2:00 pm, ESPN+		at Fairfield	L 74–78	3–6	Leo D. Mahoney Arena (1,858); Fairfield, CT
December 4, 2024*; 7:00 pm, ESPN+		at Fordham	L 75–84	3–7	Rose Hill Gymnasium (1,146); Bronx, NY
December 7, 2024*; 1:00 pm, NEC Front Row		Lehman	W 98–54	4–7	Bogota Savings Bank Center (376); Hackensack, NJ
December 11, 2024*; 7:00 pm, FS1		at Villanova	L 72–86	4–8	Finneran Pavilion (6,501); Villanova, PA
December 18, 2024*; 6:30 pm, ESPN+		at La Salle	L 72–77	4–9	John Glaser Arena (978); Philadelphia, PA
December 21, 2024*; 2:00 pm, BTN		at Minnesota	L 60–74	4–10	Williams Arena (8,949); Minneapolis, MN
December 28, 2024*; 2:00 pm, ACCN		at Boston College	L 70–78	4–11	Conte Forum (4,663); Chestnut Hill, MA
NEC regular season
January 5, 2025; 1:00 pm, NEC Front Row		at Wagner	W 71–59	5–11 (1–0)	Spiro Sports Center; Staten Island, NY
January 10, 2025; 7:00 pm, NEC Front Row		at Le Moyne	W 91–86 ^{2OT}	6–11 (2–0)	Ted Grant Court (491); DeWitt, NY
January 12, 2025; 1:00 pm, NEC Front Row		Saint Francis	L 71–75	6–12 (2–1)	Bogota Savings Bank Center (753); Hackensack, NJ
January 18, 2025; 4:00 pm, YES		Central Connecticut	L 60–71	6–13 (2–2)	Bogota Savings Bank Center (176); Hackensack, NJ
January 20, 2025; 6:00 pm, NEC Front Row		at Chicago State	W 58–48	7–13 (3–2)	Jones Convocation Center (200); Chicago, IL
January 26, 2025; 2:00 pm, NEC Front Row		at Stonehill	W 65–54	8–13 (4–2)	Merkert Gymnasium (974); Easton, MA
January 30, 2025; 7:00 pm, YES		Le Moyne	W 78–74	9–13 (5–2)	Bogota Savings Bank Center (508); Hackensack, NJ
February 1, 2025; 3:30 pm, NEC Front Row		Mercyhurst	L 60–67	9–14 (5–3)	Bogota Savings Bank Center (346); Hackensack, NJ
February 6, 2025; 7:00 pm, ESPN+/YES		at Central Connecticut	L 66–87	9–15 (5–4)	William H. Detrick Gymnasium (1,133); New Britain, CT
February 8, 2025; 1:00 pm, NEC Front Row		Wagner	W 69–58	10–15 (6–4)	Bogota Savings Bank Center (246); Hackensack, NJ
February 13, 2025; 7:00 pm, NEC Front Row		Chicago State	W 91–49	11–15 (7–4)	Bogota Savings Bank Center (257); Hackensack, NJ
February 15, 2025; 2:00 pm, NEC Front Row		at LIU	L 58–62	11–16 (7–5)	Steinberg Wellness Center (222); Brooklyn, NY
February 20, 2025; 7:00 pm, NEC Front Row		at Mercyhurst	L 60–65	11–17 (7–6)	Owen McCormick Court (879); Erie, PA
February 22, 2025; 2:00 pm, NEC Front Row		at Saint Francis	L 80–85 ^{OT}	11–18 (7–7)	DeGol Arena; Loretto, PA
February 27, 2025; 8:30 pm, NEC Front Row		Stonehill	W 82–69	12–18 (8–7)	Bogota Savings Bank Center (250); Hackensack, NJ
March 1, 2025; 1:00 pm, NEC Front Row		LIU	L 55–74	12–19 (8–8)	Bogota Savings Bank Center (587); Hackensack, NJ
NEC Tournament
March 5, 2025; 7:00 pm, NEC Front Row	(4)	(5) Stonehill; Quarterfinals	W 71–56	13–19	Bogota Savings Bank Center (1,000); Hackensack, NJ
March 8, 2025; 2:00 pm, YES/NEC Front Row	(4)	at (1) Central Connecticut; Semifinals	L 72–76 ^{OT}	13–20	William H. Detrick Gymnasium (2,517); New Britain, CT
*Non-conference game. ^{#}Rankings from AP Poll. (#) Tournament seedings in parentheses. All times are in Eastern.
