= Rob Krimmel =

American basketball coach (born 1977)

Biographical details
- Born: September 27, 1977 (age 49)

Playing career
- 1996–2000: Saint Francis
- Position: Point guard

Coaching career (HC unless noted)
- 2000–2012: Saint Francis (asst.)
- 2012–2025: Saint Francis

Head coaching record
- Overall: 170–228 (.427)
- Tournaments: 0–1 (NCAA); 0–1 (NIT); 1–3 (CIT)

Accomplishments and honors

Championships
- NEC regular season (2019); NEC tournament (2025)

Awards
- NEC Coach of the Year (2019)

Rob Krimmel (born September 27, 1977) is an American men's basketball head coach who was the head coach at Saint Francis University in Loretto, Pennsylvania from 2012 until 2025.

== Saint Francis University ==
Krimmel was named the 21st head coach in Saint Francis University men's basketball program history, succeeding Don Friday who was fired after 4 seasons at the helm.

Krimmel guided St. Francis to the 2025 NCAA tournament as NEC champions. In 2025, upon the announcement that St. Francis would drop down to Division III, he announced his resignation.

== Head coaching record ==
Record table
Season	Team	Overall	Conference	Standing	Postseason
Saint Francis Red Flash (Northeast Conference) (2012–2025)
2012–13	Saint Francis	5–24	5–13	11th	
2013–14	Saint Francis	10–21	7–9	7th	
2014–15	Saint Francis	16–16	9–9	T–5th	CIT First Round
2015–16	Saint Francis	13–17	9–9	T–6th	
2016–17	Saint Francis	17–17	11–7	T–3rd	CIT Second Round
2017–18	Saint Francis	18–13	12–6	T–2nd	CIT First Round
2018–19	Saint Francis	18–15	12–6	T–1st	NIT First Round
2019–20	Saint Francis	22–10	13–5	T–2nd	
2020–21	Saint Francis	6–15	5–12	9th	
2021–22	Saint Francis	9–21	5–13	T–8th	
2022–23	Saint Francis	13–18	9–7	4th	
2023–24	Saint Francis	8–22	3–13	8th	
2024–25	Saint Francis	16–18	8–8	T–4th	NCAA Division I First Four
Saint Francis Red Flash:		170–228 (.427)	108–117 (.480)		
Total:		170–228 (.427)			
National champion Postseason invitational champion Conference regular season champion Conference regular season and conference tournament champion Division regular season champion Division regular season and conference tournament champion Conference tournament champion
