= 2024–25 Chicago State Cougars men's basketball team =

American college basketball season

2024–25 Chicago State Cougars men's basketball
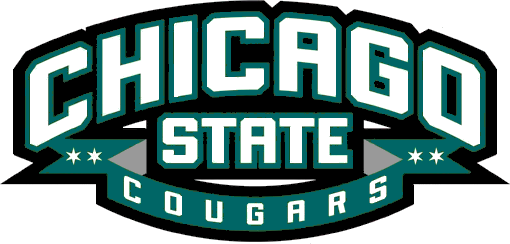
- Conference: Northeast Conference
- Record: 4–28 (4–12 NEC)
- Head coach: Scott Spinelli (1st season)
- Associate head coach: Kevin McClain
- Assistant coaches: Dalonte Hill; Ramim Bhuiya
- Home arena: Jones Convocation Center

2024–25 Northeast Conference men's basketball standings
	Conf.				Overall
Team	W		L	PCT	W		L	PCT
Central Connecticut	14	–	2	.875	25	–	7	.781
LIU	12	–	4	.750	17	–	16	.515
Mercyhurst **	9	–	7	.563	15	–	16	.484
Saint Francis †	8	–	8	.500	16	–	18	.471
Fairleigh Dickinson	8	–	8	.500	13	–	20	.394
Stonehill *	7	–	9	.438	15	–	17	.469
Wagner	6	–	10	.375	14	–	16	.467
Chicago State	4	–	12	.250	4	–	28	.125
Le Moyne *	4	–	12	.250	9	–	23	.281
† 2025 NEC tournament winner * ineligible for the 2025 NCAA tournament due to transition from Division II ** ineligible for both the 2025 NEC tournament and the 2025 NCAA tournament due to transition from Division II

The 2024–25 Chicago State Cougars men's basketball team represented Chicago State University during the 2024–25 NCAA Division I men's basketball season. The Cougars, led by first-year head coach Scott Spinelli, played their home games at the Jones Convocation Center located in Chicago, Illinois, as first-year members of the Northeast Conference. They finished the season 4–28, 4–2 in NEC play to finish in a tie for last place. They lost to LIU in the quarterfinals of the NEC tournament.

On March 7, 2025, the school fired head coach Scott Spinelli. On March 20, the school named Alcorn State head coach Landon Bussie the team's new head coach.

== Previous season ==
The Cougars finished the 2023–24 season 13–19. As an independent, they did not participate in any conference tournament. They received an invitation to the CBI, receiving the #15 seed, where they would upset UC San Diego in the first round, before losing to Fairfield in the quarterfinals. This season was the Cougars' last as an independent, as they joined the Northeast Conference for the 2024–25 season.

== Preseason polls ==
=== Northeast Conference poll ===
The Northeast Conference released its preseason coaches' poll on October 24, 2024. The Cougars were picked to finish in sixth in the conference.

Rank	Team
T-1.	Central Connecticut (5)
T-1.	Wagner (4)
3.	Fairleigh Dickinson
4.	Le Moyne
5.	LIU
6.	Chicago State
7.	Mercyhurst
T-8.	Saint Francis
T-8.	Stonehill

() first-place votes

=== Preseason All-Conference Team ===
No Cougars were selected as members of the NEC Preseason All-Conference Team.

== Roster ==
2024–25 Chicago State Cougars men's basketball team
Players
Coaches

Pos.	#	Name	Height	Weight	Year	Hometown
G	0	Greg Spate	6 ft 7 in (2.01 m)	185 lb (84 kg)	So	Plantation, Florida
G	1	Troy McCoy Jr.	6 ft 5 in (1.96 m)	205 lb (93 kg)	Fr	Windsor, Connecticut
G	2	Deshawn Jean-Charles	6 ft 7 in (2.01 m)	200 lb (91 kg)	Jr	Fort Lauderdale, Florida
G	3	Joe Spinelli	6 ft 0 in (1.83 m)	175 lb (79 kg)	Jr	Chicago, Illinois
G	4	Saxby Sunderland	6 ft 4 in (1.93 m)	190 lb (86 kg)	Jr	Arlington, Virginia
F	5	Cameron Jernigan	6 ft 7 in (2.01 m)	220 lb (100 kg)	Sr	Gary, Indiana
G	10	Matthew Robinson Jr.	6 ft 4 in (1.93 m)	200 lb (91 kg)	Jr	Miramar, Florida
F	11	Noble Crawford	6 ft 5 in (1.96 m)	195 lb (88 kg)	Sr	Deltona, Florida
G	12	Gabe Spinelli	6 ft 3 in (1.91 m)	195 lb (88 kg)	Jr	Chicago, Illinois
G	13	Jalen Forrest	6 ft 5 in (1.96 m)	225 lb (102 kg)	Jr	Decatur, Georgia
G	14	Alex Raiford	6 ft 3 in (1.91 m)	170 lb (77 kg)	Sr	Chicago, Illinois
F	20	CJ Delancy	6 ft 9 in (2.06 m)	210 lb (95 kg)	Jr	Jonesboro, Arkansas
F	22	Dailliss Cox	6 ft 6 in (1.98 m)	205 lb (93 kg)	Sr	Louisville, Kentucky
F	23	Quincy Allen	6 ft 8 in (2.03 m)	205 lb (93 kg)	Jr	Toronto, Ontario
F	24	Tehshaundre Cole	6 ft 5 in (1.96 m)	215 lb (98 kg)	Jr	Chicago, Illinois
F	25	Mike Brown	6 ft 8 in (2.03 m)	215 lb (98 kg)	GS	Washington, D.C.
F	32	Gerald Jones III	6 ft 10 in (2.08 m)	225 lb (102 kg)	Jr	Lithonia, Georgia

Head coach

- Scott Spinelli (Boston University)

Assistant coach(es)

- Kevin McClain (Alabama)
- Dalonte Hill (Charlotte)
- Ramim Bhuiya (UMass)

Legend

- (C) Team captain
- (S) Suspended
- (I) Ineligible
- (W) Walk-on
- Injured
- Current redshirt

Roster
Last update: October 29, 2024

== Schedule and results ==
Date time, TV	Rank^{#}	Opponent^{#}	Result	Record	High points	High rebounds	High assists	Site (attendance) city, state
Non-conference regular season
November 4, 2024*; 7:30 p.m., ESPN+		at Loyola Chicago	L 72–79	0–1	13 – G. Spinelli	6 – Jernigan	5 – Sunderland	Joseph J. Gentile Arena (2,626); Chicago, IL
November 9, 2024*; 7:00 p.m., NEC Front Row		Youngstown State	L 60–80	0–2	15 – G. Spinelli	6 – Forrest	3 – G. Spinelli	Jones Convocation Center (525); Chicago, IL
November 12, 2024*; 7:00 p.m., SECN+/ESPN+		at Texas	L 58–105	0–3	14 – Tied	7 – Forrest	2 – Robinson Jr.	Moody Center (10,662); Austin, TX
November 16, 2024*; 9:00 p.m., ESPN+		at San Francisco; Sunshine Slam Campus Game	L 37–82	0–4	8 – Forrest	7 – Allen	2 – G. Spinelli	Sobrato Center (1,864); San Francisco, CA
November 19, 2024*; 6:00 p.m., NEC Front Row		Eastern Kentucky	L 66–86	0–5	15 – G. Spinelli	5 – G. Spinelli	4 – Robinson Jr.	Jones Convocation Center (101); Chicago, IL
November 22, 2024*; 6:00 p.m., ESPN+		at Indiana State	L 61–97	0–6	14 – Allen	8 – Tied	1 – Tied	Hulman Center (4,397); Terre Haute, IN
November 25, 2024*; 9:30 a.m., BallerTV		vs. Radford; Sunshine Slam Ocean Bracket Semifinal	L 48–63	0–7	12 – Forrest	6 – Tied	3 – Crawford	Ocean Center (1,690); Daytona Beach, FL
November 26, 2024*; 9:30 a.m., BallerTV		vs. Drexel; Sunshine Slam Ocean Bracket Third Place	L 71–83	0–8	19 – McKoy Jr.	6 – McKoy Jr.	4 – G. Spinelli	Ocean Center (1,548); Daytona Beach, FL
November 30, 2024*; 12:00 p.m., Peacock		at No. 15 Wisconsin	L 53–74	0–9	10 – Forrest	11 – G. Spinelli	3 – G. Spinelli	Kohl Center (14,711); Madison, WI
December 2, 2024*; 7:00 p.m., Summit League Network		at St. Thomas	L 76–98	0–10	15 – McKoy Jr.	9 – Jernigan	3 – Tied	Shoenecker Arena (879); St. Paul, MN
December 8, 2024*; 2:00 p.m., ESPN+		at Saint Louis	L 62–85	0–11	18 – Crawford	7 – Forrest	2 – Tied	Chaifetz Arena (4,815); St. Louis, MO
December 15, 2024*; 1:00 p.m., ESPN+		at Mercer	L 63–75	0–12	20 – Crawford	9 – Tied	6 – Crawford	Hawkins Arena (812); Macon, GA
December 19, 2024*; 8:00 p.m., ESPN+		at Grand Canyon	L 51–74	0–13	11 – Crawford	8 – Delancy	3 – Crawford	Global Credit Union Arena (7,024); Phoenix, AZ
December 21, 2024*; 1:00 p.m., ESPN+		at Cal State Northridge	L 57–81	0–14	14 – Tied	9 – Crawford	6 – Crawford	Premier America Credit Union Arena (650); Northridge, CA
December 29, 2024*; 1:00 p.m., BTN		at No. 24 Illinois	L 64–117	0–15	20 – G. Spinelli	6 – Forrest	3 – G. Spinelli	State Farm Center (15,544); Champaign, IL
NEC regular season
January 3, 2025; 6:00 p.m., NEC Front Row		at Wagner	W 64–52	1–15 (1–0)	15 – Crawford	7 – Cox	3 – G. Spinelli	Spiro Sports Center (191); Staten Island, NY
January 5, 2024; 1:00 p.m.		at LIU	L 39–53	1–16 (1–1)	9 – G. Spinelli	9 – Forrest	3 – Sunderland	Steinberg Wellness Center (126); Brooklyn, NY
January 12, 2025; 1:00 p.m.		Stonehill	L 52–68	1–17 (1–2)	15 – Crawford	6 – Jernigan	2 – McKoy Jr.	Jones Convocation Center (145); Chicago, IL
January 18, 2025; 1:00 p.m.		Le Moyne	W 88–72	2–17 (2–2)	24 – Forrest	8 – Forrest	7 – G. Spinelli	Jones Convocation Center (216); Chicago, IL
January 20, 2025; 7:00 p.m.		Fairleigh Dickinson	L 48–58	2–18 (2–3)	17 – Forrest	9 – Delancy	3 – Tied	Jones Convocation Center (200); Chicago, IL
January 24, 2025; 6:00 p.m.		at Stonehill	L 73–75	2–19 (2–4)	25 – Spinelli	8 – Allen	2 – Tied	Merkert Gymnasium (1,265); Easton, MA
January 26, 2025; 12:00 p.m.		at Central Connecticut	L 64–81	2–20 (2–5)	13 – G. Spinelli	8 – Allen	4 – Sunderland	William H. Detrick Gymnasium (1,126); New Britain, CT
February 1, 2025; 1:00 p.m.		LIU	W 73–67 ^{OT}	3–20 (3–5)	19 – Forrest	7 – G. Spinelli	2 – Tied	Jones Convocation Center (185); Chicago, IL
February 6, 2025; 6:00 p.m.		Mercyhurst	W 85–78	4–20 (4–5)	37 – Forrest	7 – Forrest	5 – G. Spinelli	Jones Convocation Center (85); Chicago, IL
February 8, 2025; 1:00 p.m., ESPN+		Saint Francis	L 69–81	4–21 (4–6)	23 – G. Spinelli	8 – Allen	4 – G. Spinelli	Jones Convocation Center (275); Chicago, IL
February 13, 2025; 6:00 p.m.		at Fairleigh Dickinson	L 49–91	4–22 (4–7)	15 – Allen	9 – Allen	5 – G. Spinelli	Bogota Savings Bank Center (257); Hackensack, NJ
February 15, 2025; 1:00 p.m.		at Le Moyne	L 75–80	4–23 (4–8)	22 – Forrest	8 – Allen	4 – G. Spinelli	Ted Grant Court (520); DeWitt, NY
February 20, 2025; 6:00 p.m.		Central Connecticut	L 75–81	4–24 (4–9)	20 – Cox	10 – Cox	5 – G. Spinelli	Jones Convocation Center (295); Chicago, IL
February 22, 2025; 1:00 p.m.		Wagner	L 52–64	4–25 (4–10)	15 – Tied	4 – Tied	7 – G. Spinelli	Jones Convocation Center (235); Chicago, IL
February 27, 2025; 6:00 p.m.		at Mercyhurst	L 68–90	4–26 (4–11)	19 – Forrest	5 – Cox	4 – G. Spinelli	Owen McCormick Court (654); Erie, PA
March 1, 2025; 1:00 p.m.		at Saint Francis	L 71–80 ^{OT}	4–27 (4–12)	22 – Allen	10 – Robinson	7 – G. Spinelli	DeGol Arena (899); Loretto, PA
NEC Tournament
March 5, 2025; 7:00 p.m., NEC Front Row	(7)	at (2) LIU; Quarterfinals	L 57–68	4–28	17 – Forrest	6 – Allen	4 – G. Spinelli	Steinberg Wellness Center (278); Brooklyn, NY
*Non-conference game. ^{#}Rankings from AP Poll. (#) Tournament seedings in parentheses. All times are in Central.
