= Gary Manchel =

American basketball coach (born 1962)

Current position
- Title: Head coach
- Team: Mercyhurst
- Conference: NEC
- Record: 406–257 (.612)

Biographical details
- Born: November 29, 1962 (age 63); Burlington, Vermont, U.S.

Playing career
- 1982–1985: Vermont

Coaching career (HC unless noted)
- 1985–1987: Slippery Rock (assistant)
- 1987–1992: Yale (assistant)
- 1992–2001: UMass Lowell
- 2001–2003: Ohio (assistant)
- 2003–present: Mercyhurst

Head coaching record
- Overall: 537–382 (.584)

Accomplishments and honors

Awards
- NE-10 Coach of the Year (2001); 3× PSAC Coach of the Year (2011, 2016, 2020)

Gary Manchel (born November 29, 1962) is an American basketball coach who is the current head coach of the Mercyhurst Lakers men's basketball team.

== Playing career ==
Growing up in South Burlington, Vermont, Manchel played high school basketball at South Burlington High School. The son of a University of Vermont professor, Manchel enrolled at UVM, where he was a member of its men's basketball team from 1982 to 1985 under Bill Whitmore, appearing in 27 games.

== Coaching career ==
After graduation, Manchel served as an assistant coach at Slippery Rock for two seasons before joining the coaching staff at Yale under Dick Kuchen for five seasons. In 1992, Manchel would become the head coach at then-Division II UMass Lowell, where he replaced Stan Van Gundy, who coached Manchel while he was an assistant at Vermont. While coach of the River Hawks, Manchel compiled a 131–125 overall record, including an NCAA Division II tournament appearance in 2001, a season in which he was named NE-10 Coach of the Year.

In 2001, Manchel would join Tim O'Shea's staff at Ohio for a pair of seasons before taking the head coaching position a Mercyhurst. In 21 seasons at the helm, Manchel has guided the Lakers to seven NCAA Division II tournament appearances, reaching the Elite Eight in 2019. On February 7, 2024, Manchel notched his 500th career win as a head coach.

== Head coaching record ==
=== NCAA ===
Record table
Season	Team	Overall	Conference	Standing	Postseason
UMass Lowell River Hawks (NECC/NE-10) (1992–2001)
1992–93	UMass Lowell	13–15	8–7		
1993–94	UMass Lowell	10–18	6–10		
1994–95	UMass Lowell	16–11	9–7		
1995–96	UMass Lowell	9–17	9–11		
1996–97	UMass Lowell	20–10	14–4		
1997–98	UMass Lowell	6–21	4–13		
1998–99	UMass Lowell	12–16	9–9		
1999–00	UMass Lowell	21–10	16–4		
2000–01	UMass Lowell	24–7	16–4	2nd	NCAA Division II Second Round
UMass Lowell:		131–125 (.512)	101–40 (.716)		
Mercyhurst Lakers (GLIAC/PSAC) (2003–2024)
2003–04	Mercyhurst	16–12	10–7	4th (South)	
2004–05	Mercyhurst	8–19	2–15	6th (South)	
2005–06	Mercyhurst	19–9	9–8	3rd (South)	
2006–07	Mercyhurst	18–11	9–8	2nd (South)	
2007–08	Mercyhurst	15–13	9–8	3rd (South)	
2008–09	Mercyhurst	16–11	4–10	6th (West)	
2009–10	Mercyhurst	18–10	8–6	3rd (West)	
2010–11	Mercyhurst	20–7	11–3	2nd (West)	
2011–12	Mercyhurst	18–10	15–7	2nd (West)	
2011–12	Mercyhurst	18–10	15–7	2nd (West)	
2012–13	Mercyhurst	16–13	12–10	5th (West)	
2013–14	Mercyhurst	17–12	11–5	3rd (West)	
2014–15	Mercyhurst	20–9	17–5	2nd (West)	NCAA Division II First Round
2015–16	Mercyhurst	22–9	15–7	2nd (West)	NCAA Division II Second Round
2016–17	Mercyhurst	14–14	11–11	4th (West)	
2017–18	Mercyhurst	13–14	10–12	6th (West)	
2018–19	Mercyhurst	26–8	15–6	3rd (West)	NCAA Division II Elite Eight
2019–20	Mercyhurst	20–8	17–5	2nd (West)	NCAA Division II Canceled
2020–21	Mercyhurst	12–1	0–0	N/A	NCAA Division II Second Round
2021–22	Mercyhurst	25–7	17–5	2nd (West)	NCAA Division II Second Round
2022–23	Mercyhurst	25–6	18–4	2nd (West)	NCAA Division II Second Round
2023–24	Mercyhurst	15–16	11–11	5th (West)	
Mercyhurst Lakers (Northeast Conference) (2024–present)
2024–25	Mercyhurst	15–16	9–7	3rd	
2025–26	Mercyhurst	17–17	10–8	T–3rd	
2026–27	Mercyhurst	1–5	0–0		
Mercyhurst:		406–257 (.612)	250–168 (.598)		
Total:		537–382 (.584)			
National champion Postseason invitational champion Conference regular season champion Conference regular season and conference tournament champion Division regular season champion Division regular season and conference tournament champion Conference tournament champion
