= 2024–25 Stonehill Skyhawks men's basketball team =

American college basketball season

2024–25 Stonehill Skyhawks men's basketball
- Conference: Northeast Conference
- Record: 15–17 (7–9 NEC)
- Head coach: Chris Kraus (12th season)
- Assistant coaches: Jared Czech; Jason Karys; Bill Herrion; Aaron Loredo
- Home arena: Merkert Gymnasium

2024–25 Northeast Conference men's basketball standings
	Conf.				Overall
Team	W		L	PCT	W		L	PCT
Central Connecticut	14	–	2	.875	25	–	7	.781
LIU	12	–	4	.750	17	–	16	.515
Mercyhurst **	9	–	7	.563	15	–	16	.484
Saint Francis †	8	–	8	.500	16	–	18	.471
Fairleigh Dickinson	8	–	8	.500	13	–	20	.394
Stonehill *	7	–	9	.438	15	–	17	.469
Wagner	6	–	10	.375	14	–	16	.467
Chicago State	4	–	12	.250	4	–	28	.125
Le Moyne *	4	–	12	.250	9	–	23	.281
† 2025 NEC tournament winner * ineligible for the 2025 NCAA tournament due to transition from Division II ** ineligible for both the 2025 NEC tournament and the 2025 NCAA tournament due to transition from Division II

The 2024–25 Stonehill Skyhawks men's basketball team represented Stonehill College during the 2024–25 NCAA Division I men's basketball season. The Skyhawks, led by 12th-year head coach Chris Kraus, played their home games at Merkert Gymnasium in Easton, Massachusetts as members of the Northeast Conference.

This season was Stonehill's third year of a four-year transition period from Division II to Division I. As a result, the Skyhawks are not eligible for NCAA postseason play until the 2026–27 season. If Stonehill meets the revised criteria under January 2025 NCAA legislation to have their four-year transition period reduced to three years and applies to the NCAA to do so, they will become eligible for NCAA postseason play during the 2025–26 season.

== Previous season ==
The Skyhawks finished the 2023–24 season 4–27, 2–14 in NEC play to finish in last place.

== Preseason polls ==
=== Northeast Conference poll ===
The Northeast Conference released its preseason coaches' poll on October 24, 2024. The Skyhawks were picked to finish in a tie for eighth in the conference.

Rank	Team
T-1.	Central Connecticut (5)
T-1.	Wagner (4)
3.	Fairleigh Dickinson
4.	Le Moyne
5.	LIU
6.	Chicago State
7.	Mercyhurst
T-8.	Saint Francis
T-8.	Stonehill

() first-place votes

=== Ken Pom ranking ===
Stonehill was ranked 358th of 364 Division I teams in the preseason Pomeroy rankings.

=== Preseason All-Conference Team ===
No Skyhawks were selected as members of the NEC Preseason All-Conference Team.

== Roster ==
2024–25 Stonehill Skyhawks men's basketball team
Players
Coaches

Pos.	#	Name	Height	Weight	Year	Previous school	Hometown
G	1	Josh Morgan	6 ft 3 in (1.91 m)	215 lb (98 kg)	GS	Incarnate Word	Brampton, Ontario
G	2	Amir Nesbitt	6 ft 1 in (1.85 m)	180 lb (82 kg)	GS	Hampton	Newport News, Virginia
F	3	Louie Semona	6 ft 8 in (2.03 m)	205 lb (93 kg)	So	St. Thomas More School	Cincinnati, Ohio
G	4	Alex Bates IV	6 ft 5 in (1.96 m)	190 lb (86 kg)	So	Iona	Charlotte, North Carolina
G	5	Chas Stinson	6 ft 4 in (1.93 m)	195 lb (88 kg)	Jr	Hickory Grove Christian School	Charlotte, North Carolina
G	10	Hermann Koffi	6 ft 4 in (1.93 m)	200 lb (91 kg)	Fr	Polyvalente de Thetford Mines	Quebec City, Quebec
G	12	Eino Montin	6 ft 1 in (1.85 m)	180 lb (82 kg)	So	Temple College	Tuira, Finland
G	13	Jake TenBerge	6 ft 6 in (1.98 m)	205 lb (93 kg)	Jr	Compton College	Los Angeles, California
G	20	Nathan McGill	6 ft 4 in (1.93 m)	190 lb (86 kg)	Sr	Northern High School	Dillsburg, Pennsylvania
F	21	Todd Brogna	6 ft 7 in (2.01 m)	220 lb (100 kg)	So	Worcester Academy	Southborough, Massachusetts
G	22	Charlie Diamantis	6 ft 3 in (1.91 m)	165 lb (75 kg)	Jr	Joseph A. Foran High School	Milford, Connecticut
F	23	Christopher Melis	6 ft 5 in (1.96 m)	205 lb (93 kg)	Sr	St. Thomas More School	Chappaqua, New York
F	31	Pearse McGuinn	6 ft 8 in (2.03 m)	205 lb (93 kg)	Fr	Cardinal O'Hara High School	Havertown, Pennsylvania
F	33	Ethan Meuser	6 ft 8 in (2.03 m)	205 lb (93 kg)	Jr	The Hill School	Shavertown, Pennsylvania
F	34	Neal Marquardt	6 ft 5 in (1.96 m)	205 lb (93 kg)	Sr	Chaminade High School	Rockville Centre, New York
C	35	Kesean Shillingford	7 ft 0 in (2.13 m)	230 lb (104 kg)	Fr	The Newman School	Newtown, Dominica

Head coach

- Chris Kraus (Stonehill)

Assistant coach(es)

- Jared Czech (Manhattanville)
- Jason Karys (Valparaiso)
- Bill Herrion (Merrimack)
- Aaron Loredo (Salem State)

Legend

- (C) Team captain
- (S) Suspended
- (I) Ineligible
- (W) Walk-on
- Injured
- Current redshirt

Roster
Last update: November 12, 2024

== Schedule and results ==
Date time, TV	Rank^{#}	Opponent^{#}	Result	Record	High points	High rebounds	High assists	Site (attendance) city, state
Non-conference regular season
November 4, 2024*; 5:00 p.m., NEC Front Row		Framingham State	W 81–62	1–0	25 – Morgan	8 – Brogna	4 – Tied	Merkert Gymnasium; Easton, MA
November 6, 2024*; 7:00 p.m., ACCNX		at Notre Dame	L 60–89	1–1	16 – Brogna	5 – Meuser	3 – Nesbitt	Joyce Center (5,121); South Bend, IN
November 9, 2024*; 6:00 p.m., FS2		at Providence	L 49–76	1–2	12 – Nesbitt	5 – Brogna	5 – Nesbitt	Amica Mutual Pavilion (11,027); Providence, RI
November 14, 2024*; 7:00 p.m., ESPN+		at Robert Morris; Urban-Bennett Invitational	L 51–63	1–3	17 – Brogna	9 – Brogna	4 – Nesbitt	UPMC Events Center; Moon Township, PA
November 15, 2024*; 4:00 p.m., ESPN+		vs. New Orleans; Urban-Bennett Invitational	W 80–54	2–3	20 – Morgan	10 – Morgan	5 – Tied	UPMC Events Center; Moon Township, PA
November 17, 2024*; 1:00 p.m., ESPN+		vs. Lindenwood; Urban-Bennett Invitational	L 74–75	2–4	16 – Morgan	6 – Morgan	5 – Stinson	UPMC Events Center; Moon Township, PA
November 21, 2024*; 7:00 p.m., NEC Front Row		Bryant	W 67–66	3–4	22 – Morgan	15 – Brogna	3 – Nesbitt	Merkert Gymnasium (1,324); Easton, MA
November 25, 2024*; 7:00 p.m., NEC Front Row		East Texas A&M	W 67–65	4–4	20 – Morgan	4 – Tied	5 – Nesbitt	Merkert Gymnasium (1,052); Easton, MA
November 27, 2024*; 9:00 p.m., FS2		at No. 10 Marquette	L 59–94	4–5	14 – Nesbitt	4 – Koffi	5 – Semona	Fiserv Forum (14,715); Milwaukee, WI
December 1, 2024*; 4:00 p.m., NEC Front Row		Quinnipiac	W 88–74	5–5	22 – Morgan	9 – Stinson	4 – Tied	Merkert Gymnasium (722); Easton, MA
December 11, 2024*; 7:00 p.m., NEC Front Row		Lesley	W 97–53	6–5	24 – Semona	8 – Brogna	6 – Stinson	Merkert Gymnasium (112); Easton, MA
December 15, 2024*; 4:00 p.m., ACCNX/ESPN+		at Boston College	L 69–73	6–6	25 – Brogna	7 – Stinson	4 – Brogna	Conte Forum (3,993); Chestnut Hill, MA
December 18, 2024*; 6:00 p.m., ESPN+		at UMass Lowell	L 67–78	6–7	14 – Semona	4 – Stinson	3 – Nesbitt	Costello Athletic Center (395); Lowell, MA
December 22, 2024*; 1:00 p.m., NEC Front Row		New Hampshire	W 90–83	7–7	22 – Semona	8 – Meuser	6 – Meuser	Merkert Gymnasium (390); Easton, MA
December 29, 2024*; 1:00 p.m., ESPN+		at Lafayette	W 70–65	8–7	15 – Semona	9 – Stinson	3 – Tied	Kirby Sports Center (1,064); Easton, PA
NEC regular season
January 3, 2025; 7:00 p.m., NEC Front Row		at Mercyhurst	L 69–76	8–8 (0–1)	19 – Brogna	8 – Semona	3 – Nesbitt	Owen McCormick Court (187); Erie, PA
January 5, 2025; 2:00 p.m., NEC Front Row		at Saint Francis	W 64–60	9–8 (1–1)	17 – Koffi	13 – Brogna	4 – Semona	DeGol Arena (407); Loretto, PA
January 10, 2025; 7:00 p.m., NEC Front Row		LIU	L 60–70	9–9 (1–2)	17 – Semona	5 – Tied	4 – Tied	Merkert Gymnasium (625); Easton, MA
January 12, 2025; 2:00 p.m., NEC Front Row		at Chicago State	W 68–52	10–9 (2–2)	18 – Koffi	6 – Tied	5 – Stinson	Jones Convocation Center (145); Chicago, IL
January 20, 2025; 7:30 p.m., NEC Front Row		at Le Moyne	L 72–73	10–10 (2–3)	18 – Koffi	6 – Tied	3 – Brogna	Ted Grant Court (573); DeWitt, NY
January 24, 2025; 7:00 p.m., NEC Front Row		Chicago State	W 75–73	11–10 (3–3)	21 – Semona	11 – Stinson	7 – Stinson	Merkert Gymnasium (1,265); Easton, MA
January 26, 2025; 2:00 p.m., NEC Front Row		Fairleigh Dickinson	L 54–65	11–11 (3–4)	14 – Morgan	8 – Semona	3 – Tied	Merkert Gymnasium (974); Easton, MA
January 30, 2025; 7:00 p.m., NEC Front Row		Wagner	W 73–61	12–11 (4–4)	28 – Brogna	8 – Semona	3 – Tied	Merkert Gymnasium (872); Easton, MA
February 1, 2025; 2:00 p.m., NEC Front Row		Central Connecticut	L 63–71	12–12 (4–5)	20 – Semona	9 – Brogna	6 – Nesbitt	Merkert Gymnasium (411); Easton, MA
February 8, 2025; 2:00 p.m., NEC Front Row		at LIU	L 59–62	12–13 (4–6)	23 – Semona	7 – Semona	5 – Stinson	Steinberg Wellness Center (317); Brooklyn, NY
February 13, 2025; 7:00 p.m., NEC Front Row		Saint Francis	W 79–74	13–13 (5–6)	18 – Brogna	8 – Brogna	4 – Nesbitt	Merkert Gymnasium (727); Easton, MA
February 15, 2025; 1:00 p.m., ESPN+/NESN 360		Mercyhurst	W 85–73	14–13 (6–6)	30 – Semona	10 – Brogna	4 – Brogna	Merkert Gymnasium (848); Easton, MA
February 20, 2025; 7:00 p.m., NEC Front Row		at Wagner	L 57–63	14–14 (6–7)	14 – Meuser	12 – Brogna	4 – Stinson	Spiro Sports Center; Staten Island, NY
February 22, 2025; 4:00 p.m., NEC Front Row		at Central Connecticut	L 41–67	14–15 (6–8)	11 – Brogna	7 – Meuser	3 – Meuser	William H. Detrick Gymnasium (1,650); New Britain, CT
February 27, 2025; 8:30 p.m., NEC Front Row		at Farleigh Dickinson	L 69–82	14–16 (6–9)	24 – Semona	9 – Semona	3 – Semona	Bogota Savings Bank Center (250); Hackensack, NJ
March 1, 2025; 4:30 p.m., NEC Front Row		Le Moyne	W 85–79	15–16 (7–9)	33 – Semona	7 – Tied	3 – Tied	Merkert Gymnasium (1,054); Easton, MA
NEC Tournament
March 5, 2025; 7:00 p.m., NEC Front Row	(5)	at (4) Farleigh Dickinson; Quarterfinals	L 56–71	15–17	15 – Semona	10 – Brogna	3 – Nesbitt	Bogota Savings Bank Center (1,000); Hackensack, NJ
*Non-conference game. ^{#}Rankings from AP poll. (#) Tournament seedings in parentheses. All times are in Eastern.
