= 2024–25 Manhattan Jaspers men's basketball team =

American college basketball season

2024–25 Manhattan Jaspers men's basketball
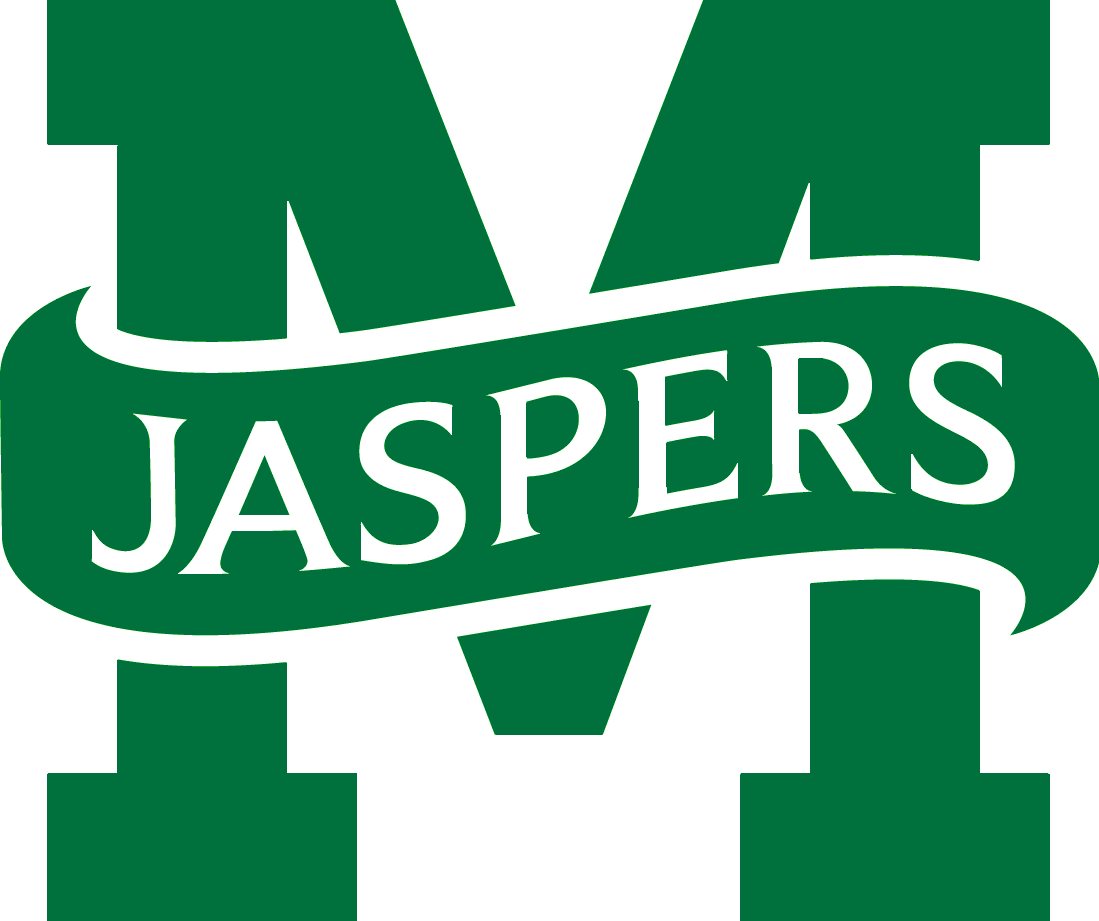

CBI, first round
- Conference: Metro Atlantic Athletic Conference
- Record: 17–14 (12–8 MAAC)
- Head coach: John Gallagher (2nd season)
- Assistant coaches: Tim Brooks; Anthony Doran; JR Lynch; Andrew Wisniewski; Tommy Dempsey
- Home arena: Draddy Gymnasium

2024–25 MAAC men's basketball standings
	Conf.				Overall
Team	W		L	PCT	W		L	PCT
Quinnipiac	15	–	5	.750	20	–	13	.606
Merrimack	14	–	6	.700	18	–	15	.545
Marist	13	–	7	.650	20	–	10	.667
Iona	12	–	8	.600	17	–	17	.500
Manhattan	12	–	8	.600	17	–	14	.548
Mount St. Mary's †	12	–	8	.600	23	–	13	.639
Sacred Heart	10	–	10	.500	15	–	18	.455
Rider	9	–	11	.450	14	–	19	.424
Siena	9	–	11	.450	14	–	18	.438
Fairfield	8	–	12	.400	12	–	20	.375
Saint Peter's	7	–	13	.350	12	–	16	.429
Niagara	6	–	14	.300	11	–	20	.355
Canisius	3	–	17	.150	3	–	28	.097
† 2025 MAAC tournament winner

The 2024–25 Manhattan Jaspers men's basketball team represented Manhattan University during the 2024–25 NCAA Division I men's basketball season. The Jaspers, led by second-year head coach John Gallagher, played their home games at Draddy Gymnasium in Riverdale, New York as members of the Metro Atlantic Athletic Conference (MAAC). The Jaspers finished the season 17–14, 12–8 in MAAC play, to finish in a tie for fourth place. They were defeated by Iona in the quarterfinals of the MAAC tournament. They received an invitation to the CBI, where they fell to Incarnate Word in the first round.

== Previous season ==
The Jaspers finished the 2023–24 season 7–23, 4–16 in MAAC play, to finish in tenth place. They were defeated by Iona in the first round of the MAAC tournament.

== Roster ==
2024–25 Manhattan Jaspers men's basketball team
Players
Coaches

Pos.	#	Name	Height	Weight	Year	Previous school	Hometown
G	0	Devin Dinkins	5 ft 10 in (1.78 m)	165 lb (75 kg)	RS So	George Mason	Washington, D.C.
G	1	Shaquil Bender	6 ft 2 in (1.88 m)	185 lb (84 kg)	Sr	Fullerton College	Philadelphia, PA
G	2	Jaden Winston	6 ft 0 in (1.83 m)	160 lb (73 kg)	So	DeMatha Catholic High School	South Laurel, MD
G	3	John Berbano	6 ft 2 in (1.88 m)	170 lb (77 kg)	Fr	Greenwich Country Day School	Yonkers, NY
G	4	Brett Rumpel	6 ft 4 in (1.93 m)	190 lb (86 kg)	RS Jr	St. Bonaventure	Binghamton, NY
G/F	5	Allen Myers	6 ft 9 in (2.06 m)	185 lb (84 kg)	RS Fr	New York Military Academy	North Philadelphia, PA
F	6	Alijah Curry	6 ft 8 in (2.03 m)	210 lb (95 kg)	Fr	Camden High School	Memphis, TN
G/F	7	Louis Fairtlough	6 ft 6 in (1.98 m)	200 lb (91 kg)	Fr	C.A. Queluz	Lisbon, Portugal
G	8	Aryan Arora	6 ft 1 in (1.85 m)	190 lb (86 kg)	RS Jr	IMG Academy	Tuxedo Park, NY
F	9	Will Sydnor	6 ft 8 in (2.03 m)	210 lb (95 kg)	Fr	The Patrick School	The Bronx, NY
G	10	Masiah Gilyard	6 ft 3 in (1.91 m)	195 lb (88 kg)	Jr	Blinn College	Brooklyn, NY
F	11	Michael Lawlor	6 ft 8 in (2.03 m)	210 lb (95 kg)	RS So	Eastchester High School	Eastchester, NY
F	13	Fraser Roxburgh	6 ft 7 in (2.01 m)	215 lb (98 kg)	Fr	Waverley Falcons	Melbourne, Australia
G/F	14	Wesley Robinson	6 ft 7 in (2.01 m)	210 lb (95 kg)	Sr	Bloomfield College	Burlington, NJ
C	15	Amaan Sandhu	7 ft 1 in (2.16 m)	265 lb (120 kg)	Jr	Monmouth	Punjab, India
F/C	21	Marko Ljubicic	6 ft 10 in (2.08 m)	224 lb (102 kg)	Fr	KK Cedevita Junior	Zagreb, Croatia
G	22	Daniel Hackett	6 ft 1 in (1.85 m)	175 lb (79 kg)	GS	St. Anthony's High School	Commack, NY
G	23	Jackson Delaney	6 ft 5 in (1.96 m)	205 lb (93 kg)	So	Rhode Island College	Suffern, NY

Head coach

- John Gallagher (Saint Joseph's)

Assistant coach(es)

- Tim Brooks (James Madison)
- Anthony Doran (St. John's)
- JR Lynch (Hartford)
- Andrew Wisniewski (Centenary)
- Tommy Dempsey (Binghamton)

Legend

- (C) Team captain
- (S) Suspended
- (I) Ineligible
- (W) Walk-on
- Injured
- Current redshirt

Roster
Last update: November 10, 2024

== Schedule and results ==
Date time, TV	Rank^{#}	Opponent^{#}	Result	Record	Site (attendance) city, state
Regular season
November 4, 2024*; 7:00 p.m., B1G+		at Maryland	L 49–79	0–1	Xfinity Center (13,152); College Park, MD
November 12, 2024*; 7:00 p.m., ESPN+		Mercy	W 88–71	1–1	Draddy Gymnasium (582); Riverdale, NY
November 15, 2024*; 7:00 p.m., ESPN+		Fordham; Battle of the Bronx	W 78–76	2–1	Draddy Gymnasium (1,504); Riverdale, NY
November 17, 2024*; 2:00 p.m., YES		at Fairleigh Dickinson; Metro NY/NJ Classic	L 82–85	2–2	Bogota Savings Bank Center (2,498); Hackensack, NJ
November 22, 2024*; 7:00 p.m., ESPN+		Army; Metro NY/NJ Classic	W 80–79	3–2	Draddy Gymnasium (1,106); Riverdale, NY
November 26, 2024*; 7:00 p.m., ACCN		at Virginia	L 65–74	3–3	John Paul Jones Arena (12,347); Charlottesville, VA
November 29, 2024*; 7:00 p.m., ESPN+		Le Moyne	L 77–81	3–4	Draddy Gymnasium (450); Riverdale, NY
December 6, 2024; 7:00 p.m., ESPN+		at Saint Peter's	W 70–67	4–4 (1–0)	Run Baby Run Arena (688); Jersey City, NJ
December 8, 2024; 2:00 p.m., ESPN+		Marist	L 75–82	4–5 (1–1)	Draddy Gymnasium (156); Riverdale, NY
December 18, 2024*; 7:00 p.m., NEC Front Row		at Wagner	W 80–66	5–5	Spiro Sports Center (407); Staten Island, NY
December 21, 2024*; 1:00 p.m., ESPN+		at Presbyterian	W 86–81 ^{OT}	6–5	Templeton Center (290); Clinton, SC
January 3, 2025; 7:00 p.m., ESPN+		at Siena	L 95–103 ^{2OT}	6–6 (1–2)	MVP Arena (4,927); Albany, NY
January 5, 2025; 2:00 p.m., ESPN+		at Rider	W 80–79	7–6 (2–2)	Alumni Gymnasium (1,604); Lawrenceville, NJ
January 10, 2025; 7:00 p.m., ESPN+		Mount St. Mary's	L 66–75	7–7 (2–3)	Draddy Gymnasium (350); Riverdale, NY
January 12, 2025; 2:00 p.m., ESPN+		at Merrimack	L 62–69	7–8 (2–4)	Hammel Court (717); North Andover, MA
January 18, 2025; 2:00 p.m., ESPN+		Niagara	W 72–65	8–8 (3–4)	Draddy Gymnasium (654); Riverdale, NY
January 23, 2025; 7:00 p.m., ESPN+		Fairfield	L 84–87 ^{OT}	8–9 (3–5)	Draddy Gymnasium (410); Riverdale, NY
January 25, 2025; 4:00 p.m., ESPN+		at Mount St. Mary's	W 74–64	9–9 (4–5)	Knott Arena (2,812); Emmitsburg, MD
January 31, 2025; 7:00 p.m., ESPN+		Iona	W 76–55	10–9 (5–5)	Draddy Gymnasium (1,982); Riverdale, NY
February 2, 2025; 2:00 p.m., ESPN+		at Sacred Heart	L 72–74	10–10 (5–6)	William H. Pitt Center (1,079); Fairfield, CT
February 8, 2025; 2:00 p.m., ESPN+		Saint Peter's	W 84–83 ^{OT}	11–10 (6–6)	Draddy Gymnasium (620); Riverdale, NY
February 14, 2025; 7:00 p.m., ESPN+		Merrimack	W 79–75	12–10 (7–6)	Draddy Gymnasium (573); Riverdale, NY
February 16, 2025; 2:00 p.m., ESPN+		at Fairfield	W 80–67	13–10 (8–6)	Leo D. Mahoney Arena (2,689); Fairfield, CT
February 21, 2025; 7:00 p.m., ESPN+		at Iona	L 60–65	13–11 (8–7)	Hynes Athletics Center (2,400); New Rochelle, NY
February 23, 2025; 2:00 p.m., ESPN+		Quinnipiac	L 71–74	13–12 (8–8)	Draddy Gymnasium; Riverdale, NY
February 28, 2025; 7:00 p.m., ESPN+		at Canisius	W 77–72	14–12 (9–8)	Koessler Athletic Center (619); Buffalo, NY
March 2, 2025; 2:00 p.m., ESPN+		at Niagara	W 85–70	15–12 (10–8)	Gallagher Center (1,029); Lewiston, NY
March 6, 2025; 7:00 p.m., ESPN+		Sacred Heart	W 90–74	16–12 (11–8)	Draddy Gymnasium (1,057); Riverdale, NY
March 8, 2025; 2:00 p.m., ESPN+		Siena	W 78–66	17–12 (12–8)	Draddy Gymnasium (1,320); Riverdale, NY
MAAC tournament
March 13, 2025; 6:00 p.m., ESPN+	(5)	vs. (4) Iona; Quarterfinals	L 65–77	17–13	Boardwalk Hall; Atlantic City, NJ
CBI
March 23, 2025; 12:00 p.m., FloSports		vs. Incarnate Word; First round	L 85–92	17–14	Ocean Center; Daytona Beach, FL
*Non-conference game. ^{#}Rankings from AP poll. (#) Tournament seedings in parentheses. All times are in Eastern.
