= Dwan McMillan =

American basketball coach (born 1989)

Current position
- Title: Head coach
- Team: Wagner
- Conference: NEC
- Record: 15–22 (.405)

Biographical details
- Born: August 18, 1989 (age 37)

Playing career
- 2008–2009: Miami Dade
- 2009–2010: Indian Hills
- 2010–2012: Hofstra

Coaching career (HC unless noted)
- 2012–2014: Mercyhurst (GA)
- 2014–2015: Wagner (GA)
- 2018–2019: Nazareth HS
- 2022–2024: Fordham (recruiting coordinator)
- 2024–2025: Wagner (assistant)
- 2025–2026: Wagner (interim HC)
- 2026–present: Wagner

Head coaching record
- Overall: 15–22 (.405) (college)

Dwan McMillan (born August 18, 1989) is an American basketball coach. He is currently the head coach of the Wagner Seahawks men's basketball team.

== Career ==
McMillan played college basketball for the Miami Dade Sharks, Indian Hills Warriors, and Hofstra Pride. He began his coaching career in 2012, serving as a graduate assistant at Mercyhurst for two years. During the 2014–15 season, McMillan served as a graduate manager at Wagner. He spent two years at Fordham, serving as the team's video coordinator in his first year and director of player development and recruiting coordinator in his second. In 2024, he returned to Wagner, being named an assistant coach.

On October 28, 2025, McMillan was named the interim head coach for Wagner, following the suspension of Donald Copeland. On April 20, 2026, Wagner officially parted ways with Copeland and named McMillan head coach.

== Head coaching record ==
Record table
Season	Team	Overall	Conference	Standing	Postseason
Wagner (Northeast Conference) (2025–present)
2025–26	Wagner	14–17	8–10	T–6th	
2026–27	Wagner	1–5	0–0		
Wagner:		15–22 (.405)	8–10 (.444)		
Total:		15–22 (.405)			
National champion Postseason invitational champion Conference regular season champion Conference regular season and conference tournament champion Division regular season champion Division regular season and conference tournament champion Conference tournament champion
