= Wagner Seahawks men's basketball =

College Basketball Team

2026–27 Wagner Seahawks men's basketball team
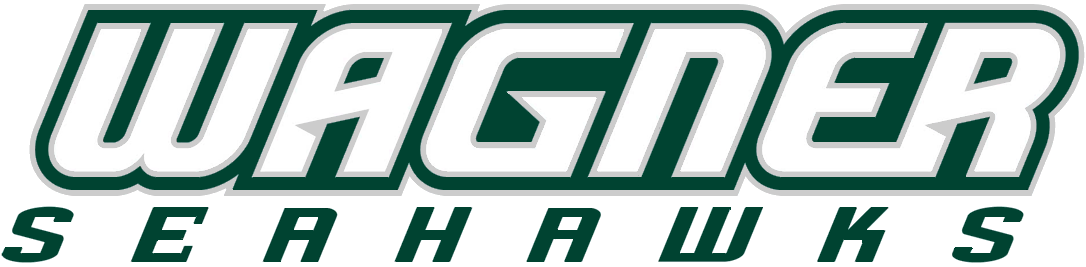
- University: Wagner College
- Head coach: Dwan McMillan (2nd season)
- Location: Staten Island, New York
- Arena: Spiro Sports Center (capacity: 2,100)
- Conference: Northeast Conference
- Nickname: Seahawks
- Colors: Green and white

NCAA Division I tournament Sweet Sixteen
- 1968*, 1969*

NCAA Division I tournament appearances
- 1967*, 1968*, 1969*, 2003, 2024

Conference tournament champions
- 2003, 2024

Conference regular-season champions
- 2003, 2016, 2018, 2021
- * at Division II level

The Wagner Seahawks men's basketball team plays for Wagner College in Staten Island, New York, United States, competing in the Northeast Conference. They are led by head coach Dwan McMillan and play their home games at the Spiro Sports Center. The Seahawks made appearances in the NCAA tournament in 2003 and 2024.

== Coaching History ==
No.	Tenure	Coach	Years	Record	Pct.
1	1976–1982	P.J. Carlesimo	6	65–93	.411
2	1982–1989	Neil Kennett	7	81–115	.413
3	1989–1999	Tim Capstraw*	10	117–164	.416
4	1999–2003	Dereck Whittenburg	4	67–50	.573
5	2003–2010	Mike Deane	7	94–114	.452
6	2010–2012	Dan Hurley	2	38–23	.623
7	2012–2022	Bashir Mason^	10	165–130	.559
8	2022–2025	Donald Copeland^	4	60–62	.492
Totals		8 coaches	54 seasons	759–790	.490
Records updated through end of 2025–26 season Source; *Alum^Promoted from assistant to head coach

== Postseason results ==
=== NCAA Division I tournament results ===
The Seahawks have appeared in the NCAA Division I tournament twice. Their record is 1–2.

Year	Seed	Round	Opponent	Result
2003	#15	Round of 64	#2 Pittsburgh	L 61–87
2024	#16	First Four; Round of 64	#16 Howard #1 North Carolina	W 71–68; L 62–90

=== NCAA Division II tournament results ===
The Seahawks have appeared in the NCAA Division II tournament three times. Their combined record is 3–3.

Year	Round	Opponent	Result
1967	Regional semifinals Regional 3rd-place game	Philadelphia Textile; Drexel	L 85–90 ^{OT} W 61–53
1968	Regional semifinals Regional Finals	Philadelphia Textile; Cheyney	W 98–84; L 57–72
1969	Regional semifinals Regional Finals	Albany; Montclair State	W 109–64; L 78–101

=== NIT results ===
The Seahawks have appeared in the National Invitation Tournament (NIT) four times. Their combined record is 1–4.

Year	Round	Opponent	Result
1979	First round	Old Dominion	L 81–83
2002	Opening Round	Richmond	L 67–74
2016	First round Second Round	St. Bonaventure; Creighton	W 79–75; L 54–87
2018	First round	Baylor	L 59–80

== Players ==
=== NBA ===
No players from Wagner have ever appeared in the National Basketball Association.

Wagner has had three players selected in the NBA draft:

- Terrance Bailey, 1987, 42nd overall
- Ray Hodge, 1970, 119th overall
- Howard Thompkins, 1981, 189th overall
