= Mercyhurst Lakers men's basketball =

Mercyhurst Lakers
2026–27 Mercyhurst Lakers men's basketball team
- University: Mercyhurst University
- Head coach: Gary Manchel (24th season)
- Location: Erie, Pennsylvania
- Arena: Mercyhurst Athletic Center (capacity: 1,100)
- Conference: Northeast Conference
- Nickname: Lakers
- Colors: Forest green and navy blue

NCAA Division I tournament Elite Eight
- Division II: 2019
Other NCAA Division I tournament results
Sweet Sixteen	Division II: 2019
Appearances	Division II: 2015, 2016, 2019, 2020, 2021, 2022, 2023

NAIA tournament appearances
- 1978

Conference tournament champions
- PSAC: 2016

The Mercyhurst Lakers men's basketball team represents Mercyhurst University in Erie, Pennsylvania. Beginning on July 1, 2024, the Lakers compete in the Division I Northeast Conference. Due to the NCAA's policy on reclassifying programs, the Lakers will not be eligible to compete in the NCAA tournament or the NIT until the 2027–28 season.

== NCAA Division II tournament results ==
The Lakers appeared in the NCAA Division II tournament seven times. Their combined record was 7–6.

Year	Round	Opponent	Result
2015	Regional first round	Fairmont State	L 63–68
2016	Regional first round Regional semifinals	Wheeling Jesuit; Kutztown	W 66–65; L 73–79
2019	Regional first round Regional semifinals Regional finals Elite Eight	Fairmont State; IUP; West Liberty; Northwest Missouri State	W 63–60 ^{OT} W 75–65; W 82–70; L 51–55
2020	Regional first round	University of Charleston	COVID-19
2021	Regional first round Regional semifinals	Fairmont State; Hillsdale	W 62–58; L 48–67
2022	Regional first round Regional semifinals	Millersville; IUP	W 71–65; L 55–58
2023	Regional first round Regional semifinals	East Stroudsburg; West Liberty	W 72–66; L 72–86

== See also ==
- Mercyhurst Lakers
