= 2023–24 UC Santa Barbara Gauchos men's basketball team =

American college basketball season

2023–24 UC Santa Barbara Gauchos men's basketball
- Conference: Big West Conference
- Record: 16–15 (9–11 Big West)
- Head coach: Joe Pasternack (7th season)
- Assistant coaches: Larry Lewis; Derek Glasser; Skye Ettin; Brian Eskildsen
- Home arena: The Thunderdome (Capacity: 5,000)

2023–24 Big West men's basketball standings
	Conf.				Overall
Team	W		L	PCT	W		L	PCT
UC Irvine	17	–	3	.850	24	–	10	.706
UC San Diego*	15	–	5	.750	21	–	12	.636
UC Davis	14	–	6	.700	20	–	13	.606
Hawai'i	11	–	9	.550	20	–	14	.588
Long Beach State †	10	–	10	.500	21	–	15	.583
UC Riverside	10	–	10	.500	16	–	18	.471
UC Santa Barbara	9	–	11	.450	16	–	15	.516
Cal State Northridge	9	–	11	.450	19	–	15	.559
Cal State Bakersfield	8	–	12	.400	13	–	19	.406
Cal State Fullerton	7	–	13	.350	14	–	18	.438
Cal Poly	0	–	20	.000	4	–	28	.125
† 2024 Big West tournament winner * ineligible for the 2024 NCAA tournament due to transition period

The 2023–24 UC Santa Barbara Gauchos men's basketball team represented the University of California, Santa Barbara in the 2023–24 NCAA Division I men's basketball season. The Gauchos, led by sixth-year head coach Joe Pasternack, played their home games at The Thunderdome in Santa Barbara, California as members of the Big West Conference.

== Previous season ==
The Gauchos finished the 2022–23 season 27–8, 15–5 in Big West play to finish in fourth place. They defeated Cal Poly, UC Riverside, and Cal State Fullerton to win the Big West tournament and earned the conference's automatic bid into the NCAA tournament. In the NCAA tournament, they received the #14 seed in the South Region. In the first round, they lost to #3 region seed Baylor.

== Roster ==
2023–24 UC Santa Barbara Gauchos men's basketball team
Players
Coaches

Pos.	#	Name	Height	Weight	Year	Previous school	Hometown
F	00	Koat Keat Tong	6 ft 10 in (2.08 m)	210 lb (95 kg)	So	Crean Lutheran HS	Bentiu, South Sudan
G	1	Josh Pierre-Louis	6 ft 4 in (1.93 m)	190 lb (86 kg)	Sr	Temple	Plainfield, NJ
G	4	Cole Anderson	6 ft 4 in (1.93 m)	185 lb (84 kg)	Jr	Clovis West HS	Fresno, CA
G	7	Matija Belic	6 ft 7 in (2.01 m)	205 lb (93 kg)	So	KK Mladost Zemun	Belgrade, Serbia
G	8	Gage Gomez	6 ft 3 in (1.91 m)	190 lb (86 kg)	Sr	Arroyo Grande HS	Arroyo Grande, CA
G	10	Jason Fontenet II	6 ft 6 in (1.98 m)	190 lb (86 kg)	Fr	Bella Vista Prep	Phoenix, AZ
G	11	Ben Shtolzberg	6 ft 4 in (1.93 m)	195 lb (88 kg)	So	Creighton	Northridge, CA
F	12	Evans Kipruto	6 ft 8 in (2.03 m)	250 lb (113 kg)	Jr	Barton Community College	Nairobi, Kenya
G	13	Ajay Mitchell	6 ft 5 in (1.96 m)	190 lb (86 kg)	Jr	Limburg United	Ans, Belgium
F	14	Kilian Brockhoff	6 ft 9 in (2.06 m)	225 lb (102 kg)	Fr	Sports Club Rasta Vechta	Cuxhaven, Germany
G	18	Henry Hartwell	6 ft 5 in (1.96 m)	190 lb (86 kg)	RS So	El Camino HS	Oceanside, CA
F	21	Yohan Traore	6 ft 11 in (2.11 m)	235 lb (107 kg)	So	Auburn	Tours, France
F	23	Ariel Bland	6 ft 7 in (2.01 m)	215 lb (98 kg)	Jr	Golden State Prep	Eden Prairie, MN
G	26	Elia Bongiorno	6 ft 2 in (1.88 m)	190 lb (86 kg)	Fr	The King's Academy	Arona, Italy
F	31	Konner Baroni	6 ft 8 in (2.03 m)	210 lb (95 kg)	RS Jr	Yuba College	Auburn, CA
C	34	Mezziah Oakman	7 ft 0 in (2.13 m)	230 lb (104 kg)	Jr	City College SF	New York, NY
F	40	David Pickles	6 ft 10 in (2.08 m)	235 lb (107 kg)	Jr	Mercer Island HS	Seattle, WA
G	99	Max Sheldon	5 ft 11 in (1.8 m)	180 lb (82 kg)	Jr	San Marcos HS	Santa Barbara, CA

Head coach

- Joe Pasternack (Indiana)

Assistant coach(es)

- Larry Lewis (Morehouse)
- Derek Glasser (Arizona State)
- Skye Ettin (TCNJ)
- Brian Eskildsen (Tennessee)

Legend

- (C) Team captain
- (S) Suspended
- (I) Ineligible
- (W) Walk-on
- Injured
- Current redshirt

Roster
Last update: September 27, 2023

== Schedule and results ==
Date time, TV	Rank^{#}	Opponent^{#}	Result	Record	High points	High rebounds	High assists	Site (attendance) city, state
Non-conference regular season
November 9, 2023*; 7:00 p.m., ESPN+		Portland State	L 76–82	0–1	21 – Anderson	13 – Bland	5 – Pierre-Louis	The Thunderdome (3,840); Santa Barbara, CA
November 13, 2023*; 6:05 p.m., CBSSN		at UTEP	L 76–89	0–2	23 – Traore	6 – Tied	5 – Pierre-Louis	Don Haskins Center (7,121); El Paso, TX
November 19, 2023*; 6:00 p.m., ESPN+		Le Moyne	W 96–72	1–2	20 – Anderson	11 – Bland	10 – Pierre-Louis	The Thunderdome (1,756); Santa Barbara, CA
November 22, 2023*; 6:00 p.m., ESPN+		Westmont	W 91–79	2–2	21 – Mitchell	9 – Bland	4 – Tied	The Thunderdome (1,204); Santa Barbara, CA
November 27, 2023*; 7:00 p.m., MWN		at Fresno State	W 69–65	3–2	27 – Mitchell	7 – Mitchell	2 – Tied	Save Mart Center (2,796); Fresno, CA
November 29, 2023*; 7:00 p.m., ESPN+		Northern Arizona	W 70–59	4–2	30 – Mitchell	10 – Pierre-Louis	5 – Mitchell	The Thunderdome (1,603); Santa Barbara, CA
December 6, 2023*; 6:00 p.m., MWN		at New Mexico	L 61–84	4–3	22 – Mitchell	5 – Tied	5 – Mitchell	The Pit (10,311); Albuquerque, NM
December 9, 2023*; 1:00 p.m., ESPN+		Bethesda	W 126–76	5–3	20 – Anderson	13 – Bland	10 – Bland	The Thunderdome (798); Santa Barbara, CA
December 16, 2023*; 1:30 p.m., ESPN+		vs. Loyola Marymount; Jerry Colangelo Classic	W 68–59	6–3	25 – Mitchell	11 – Bland	3 – Kipruto	Footprint Center; Phoenix, AZ
December 20, 2023*; 7:00 p.m., ESPN+		Howard	W 94–81	7–3	24 – Traore	11 – Pierre-Louis	8 – Pierre-Louis	The Thunderdome (1,073); Santa Barbara, CA
Big West regular season
December 28, 2023; 6:30 p.m., ESPNU/ESPN+		at UC Davis	L 62–76	7–4 (0–1)	25 – Traore	5 – Bland	4 – Pierre-Louis	University Credit Union Center (1,771); Davis, CA
December 30, 2023; 5:00 p.m., ESPN+		at UC Riverside	L 77–79	7–5 (0–2)	39 – Mitchell	9 – Traore	2 – Tied	SRC Arena (375); Riverside, CA
January 4, 2024; 7:00 p.m., ESPN+		UC San Diego	L 72–79	7–6 (0–3)	14 – Mitchell	5 – Tied	4 – Tied	The Thunderdome (1,914); Santa Barbara, CA
January 6, 2024; 7:00 p.m., ESPN+		at Cal Poly	W 61–52	8–6 (1–3)	16 – Anderson	10 – Fontenet II	2 – Mitchell	Mott Athletics Center (2,687); San Luis Obispo, CA
January 11, 2024; 7:00 p.m., ESPN+		Cal State Bakersfield	W 66–64 ^{OT}	9–6 (2–3)	22 – Mitchell	10 – Bland	4 – Shtolzberg	The Thunderdome (1,602); Santa Barbara, CA
January 13, 2024; 7:00 p.m., ESPN+		Long Beach State	W 85–76	10–6 (3–3)	26 – Mitchell	7 – Pierre-Louis	6 – Pierre-Louis	The Thunderdome (2,892); Santa Barbara, CA
January 18, 2024; 7:00 p.m., ESPN+		at CSUN	W 97–69	11–6 (4–3)	19 – Traore	9 – Traore	6 – Tied	Premier America Credit Union Arena (583); Northridge, CA
January 20, 2024; 1:00 p.m., ESPN+		Cal State Fullerton	L 69–73	11–7 (4–4)	19 – Anderson	13 – Traore	6 – Mitchell	The Thunderdome (1,414); Santa Barbara, CA
January 25, 2024; 9:00 p.m., ESPN+		at Hawai'i	W 78–61	12–7 (5–4)	25 – Mitchell	10 – Pierre-Louis	6 – Mitchell	Stan Sheriff Center (4,279); Honolulu, HI
February 1, 2024; 7:00 p.m., ESPN+		UC Davis	L 69–79	12–8 (5–5)	25 – Mitchell	6 – Mitchell	5 – Mitchell	The Thunderdome (2,204); Santa Barbara, CA
February 3, 2024; 7:00 p.m., ESPN+		at CSU Bakersfield	W 70–59	13–8 (6–5)	20 – Pierre-Louis	7 – Tied	4 – Mitchell	Icardo Center; Bakersfield, CA
February 8, 2024; 7:00 p.m., ESPN+		UC Irvine	L 61–76	13–9 (6–6)	17 – Mitchell	8 – Bland	2 – Tied	The Thunderdome (1,992); Santa Barbara, CA
February 10, 2024; 7:00 p.m., ESPN+		CSUN	L 74–82	13–10 (6–7)	29 – Mitchell	6 – Brockhoff	7 – Mitchell	The Thunderdome (1,619); Santa Barbara, CA
February 15, 2024; 7:00 p.m., ESPN+		at UC San Diego	L 46–61	13–11 (6–8)	14 – Traore	6 – Tied	2 – Tied	RIMAC Arena (1,892); La Jolla, CA
February 17, 2024; 1:00 p.m., ESPN+		Hawai'i	W 77–71	14–11 (7–8)	23 – Mitchell	7 – Fontenet II	5 – Mitchell	The Thunderdome (1,427); Santa Barbara, CA
February 22, 2024; 7:00 p.m., ESPN+		at UC Irvine	L 69–81	14–12 (7–9)	22 – Traore	6 – Mitchell	3 – Fontenet II	Bren Events Center (3,272); Irvine, CA
February 29, 2024; 7:00 p.m., ESPN+		Cal Poly	W 83–75	15–12 (8–9)	22 – Mitchell	9 – Pierre-Louis	7 – Mitchell	The Thunderdome (4,000); Santa Barbara, CA
March 2, 2024; 6:00 p.m., ESPN+		at Cal State Fullerton	L 70–79	15–13 (8–10)	24 – Pierre-Louis	6 – Fontenet II	5 – Pierre-Louis	Titan Gym (665); Fullerton, CA
March 7, 2024; 7:00 p.m., ESPN+		at Long Beach State	W 76–74	16–13 (9–10)	37 – Mitchell	8 – Bland	5 – Tied	Walter Pyramid (2,255); Long Beach, CA
March 9, 2024; 7:00 p.m., ESPN+		UC Riverside	L 64–81	16–14 (9–11)	17 – Pierre-Louis	5 – Bland	3 – Tied	The Thunderdome (2,702); Santa Barbara, CA
Big West tournament
March 13, 2024; 8:30 pm, ESPN+	(6)	vs. (7) Cal State Northridge; First Round	L 84-87 ^{OT}	16-15	36 – Mitchell	9 – Tied	5 – Mitchell	Dollar Loan Center (717); Henderson, NV
*Non-conference game. ^{#}Rankings from AP Poll. (#) Tournament seedings in parentheses. All times are in Pacific.
