= 2023–24 Cal State Northridge Matadors men's basketball team =

American college basketball season

2023–24 Cal State Northridge Matadors men's basketball
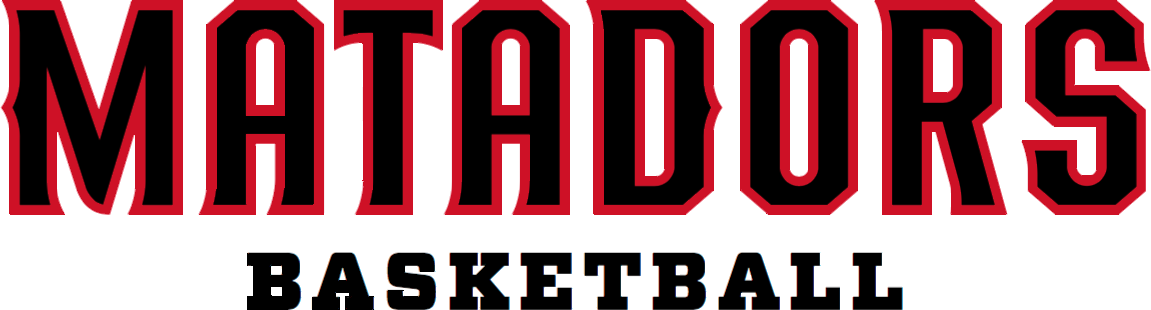
- Conference: Big West Conference
- Record: 19–15 (9–11 Big West)
- Head coach: Andy Newman (1st season)
- Assistant coaches: Scott Cutley; CJ Killin; Jordan Jamestown
- Home arena: Premier America Credit Union Arena

2023–24 Big West men's basketball standings
	Conf.				Overall
Team	W		L	PCT	W		L	PCT
UC Irvine	17	–	3	.850	24	–	10	.706
UC San Diego*	15	–	5	.750	21	–	12	.636
UC Davis	14	–	6	.700	20	–	13	.606
Hawai'i	11	–	9	.550	20	–	14	.588
Long Beach State †	10	–	10	.500	21	–	15	.583
UC Riverside	10	–	10	.500	16	–	18	.471
UC Santa Barbara	9	–	11	.450	16	–	15	.516
Cal State Northridge	9	–	11	.450	19	–	15	.559
Cal State Bakersfield	8	–	12	.400	13	–	19	.406
Cal State Fullerton	7	–	13	.350	14	–	18	.438
Cal Poly	0	–	20	.000	4	–	28	.125
† 2024 Big West tournament winner * ineligible for the 2024 NCAA tournament due to transition period

The 2023–24 Cal State Northridge Matadors men's basketball team represented California State University, Northridge in the 2023–24 NCAA Division I men's basketball season. They were led by first-year head coach Andy Newman and played their games at the Premier America Credit Union Arena as members of the Big West Conference.

== Previous season ==
The Matadors finished the season 7–25, 4–16 in conference play to finish in tenth place. In the Big West tournament, the team lost their first round game against Cal State Bakersfield to end their season. Following the conclusion of the season, the program fired head coach Trent Johnson. In April, the school hired Andy Newman, head coach of Division II Cal State San Bernardino, to lead the program.

== Roster ==
2023–24 Cal State Northridge Matadors men's basketball team
Players
Coaches

Pos.	#	Name	Height	Weight	Year	Hometown
G	0	Dionte Bostick	6 ft 2 in (1.88 m)	185 lb (84 kg)	Jr	Clearwater, Florida
F	3	Kyle Frelow	6 ft 8 in (2.03 m)	230 lb (104 kg)	Jr	Los Angeles, California
F	4	Keonte Jones	6 ft 6 in (1.98 m)	175 lb (79 kg)	Jr	Madison, Wisconsin
G	5	Gianni Hunt	6 ft 4 in (1.93 m)	190 lb (86 kg)	Sr	Lakewood, California
G	10	Simon Tilahun	6 ft 1 in (1.85 m)	160 lb (73 kg)	Fr	Los Angeles, California
F	11	Mahmoud Fofana	6 ft 6 in (1.98 m)	195 lb (88 kg)	Jr	San Jose, California
G	12	Darius Carr	6 ft 3 in (1.91 m)	190 lb (86 kg)	Fr	Los Angeles, California
G	13	Jared Barnett	6 ft 1 in (1.85 m)	155 lb (70 kg)	GS	Los Angeles, California
F	21	Bryan Ndjonga	6 ft 9 in (2.06 m)	200 lb (91 kg)	Fr	Yaoundé, Cameroon
G	23	Jordan Brinson	6 ft 2 in (1.88 m)	170 lb (77 kg)	Jr	Inglewood, California
F/C	24	Jasman Sangha	6 ft 8 in (2.03 m)	230 lb (104 kg)	GS	Brampton, Canada
F	25	De'Sean Allen-Eikens	6 ft 6 in (1.98 m)	215 lb (98 kg)	GS	Williston, North Dakota
F	32	Jack Cheng	6 ft 10 in (2.08 m)	254 lb (115 kg)	So	Beijing, China
F/C	34	Lamine Niang	6 ft 10 in (2.08 m)	225 lb (102 kg)	So	Thies, Senegal
C	35	Dearon Tucker	6 ft 10 in (2.08 m)	225 lb (102 kg)	Sr	Dallas, TX
G	-	BJ Comer	6 ft 4 in (1.93 m)	185 lb (84 kg)	Fr	Prattville, Alabama

Head coach

- Andy Newman (Azusa Pacific)

Assistant coach(es)

- Scott Cutley (Cal State Fullerton)
- CJ Killin (Nebraska–Kearney)
- Jordan Jamestown (Eastern Arizona)

Legend

- (C) Team captain
- (S) Suspended
- (I) Ineligible
- (W) Walk-on
- Injured
- Current redshirt

Roster
Last update: October 30, 2023

== Schedule and results ==
Date time, TV	Rank^{#}	Opponent^{#}	Result	Record	High points	High rebounds	High assists	Site (attendance) city, state
Regular season
November 6, 2023*; 8:00 p.m., Pac-12 Bay Area		at Stanford	L 79–88	0–1	22 – Allen-Eikens	8 – Allen-Eikens	6 – Barnett	Maples Pavilion (2,133); Palo Alto, CA
November 9, 2023*; 6:00 p.m., ESPN+		at Idaho	W 76–73	1–1	19 – Allen-Eikens	11 – Jones	6 – Barnett	Idaho Central Credit Union Arena (978); Moscow, ID
November 14, 2023*; 5:00 p.m.		at Chicago State	W 74–64	2–1	20 – Bostick	7 – Tied	6 – Barnett	Jones Convocation Center (275); Chicago, IL
November 17, 2023*; 1:00 p.m., ESPN+		Life Pacific	W 98–67	3–1	20 – Bostick	13 – Jones	6 – Brinson	Premier America Credit Union Arena (345); Northridge, CA
November 21, 2023*; 7:00 p.m., ESPN+		Le Moyne; Pacific MTE	L 70–80	3–2	20 – Tied	9 – Allen-Eikens	7 – Barnett	Premier America Credit Union Arena (387); Northridge, CA
November 24, 2023*; 7:00 p.m., ESPN+		Mississippi Valley State; Pacific MTE	W 84–48	4–2	17 – Jones	9 – Jones	4 – Tied	Premier America Credit Union Arena (390); Northridge, CA
November 29, 2023*; 7:00 p.m., ESPN+		at Pacific; Pacific MTE	W 80–69	5–2	32 – Allen-Eikens	7 – Brinson	4 – Brinson	Alex G. Spanos Center (850); Stockton, CA
December 2, 2023*; 1:00 p.m., ESPN+		at Northern Colorado	L 71–75	5–3	22 – Allen-Eikens	9 – Allen-Eikens	3 – Bostick	Bank of Colorado Arena (899); Greeley, CO
December 7, 2023*; 7:00 p.m., ESPN+		Bethesda	W 92–54	6–3	22 – Jones	11 – Tucker	8 – Brinson	Premier America Credit Union Arena (288); Northridge, CA
December 11, 2023*; 7:00 p.m., ESPN+		Utah Tech	W 80–75	7–3	19 – Bostick	6 – Tied	6 – Tied	Premier America Credit Union Arena (438); Northridge, CA
December 19, 2023*; 7:00 p.m., Pac-12 Network		at UCLA	W 76–72	8–3	18 – Bostick	11 – Fofana	4 – Brinson	Pauley Pavilion (7,274); Los Angeles, CA
December 22, 2023*; 1:00 p.m., ESPN+		Montana State	W 82–70	9–3	23 – Allen-EIkens	9 – Jones	6 – Brinson	Premier America Credit Union Arena (418); Northridge, CA
Big West regular season
December 28, 2023; 7:00 p.m., ESPN+		at Cal Poly	W 83–73	10–3 (1–0)	22 – Bostick	10 – Jones	4 – Barnett	Mott Athletics Center (1,428); San Luis Obispo, CA
December 30, 2023; 1:00 p.m., Spectrum SportsNet		at Long Beach State	W 84–68	11–3 (2–0)	21 – Bostick	10 – Jones	7 – Hunt	Walter Pyramid (2,003); Long Beach, CA
January 6, 2023; 5:00 p.m., ESPN+		Hawai'i	W 76–66	12–3 (3–0)	20 – Allen-Eikens	6 – Tied	3 – Barnett	Premier America Credit Union Arena (657); Northridge, CA
January 11, 2024; 6:00 p.m., ESPN+		at UC Davis	L 75–95	12–4 (3–1)	19 – Allen-Eikens	5 – Jones	5 – Hunt	University Credit Union Center (1,262); Davis, CA
January 13, 2024; 1:00 p.m., ESPN+		Cal State Fullerton	W 76–71	13–4 (4–1)	17 – Jones	9 – Fofana	4 – Tied	Premier America Credit Union Arena (384); Northridge, CA
January 18, 2024; 7:00 p.m., ESPN+		UC Santa Barbara	L 69–97	13–5 (4–2)	21 – Jones	8 – Jones	8 – Hunt	Premier America Credit Union Arena (583); Northridge, CA
January 20, 2024; 5:00 p.m., ESPN+		at UC Riverside	L 63–82	13–6 (4–3)	17 – Allen-Eikens	9 – Fofana	3 – Tied	SRC Arena (469); Riverside, CA
January 25, 2024; 7:00 p.m., ESPN+		Cal State Bakersfield	L 56–64	13–7 (4–4)	13 – Allen-Eikens	9 – Allen-Eikens	5 – Hunt	Premier America Credit Union Arena (1,110); Northridge, CA
January 27, 2024; 7:00 p.m., ESPN+		at UC Irvine	L 72–77	13–8 (4–5)	18 – Bostick	11 – Jones	3 – Tied	Bren Events Center (3,441); Irvine, CA
February 1, 2024; 7:00 p.m., ESPN+		at UC San Diego	L 62–83	13–9 (4–6)	19 – Allen-Eikens	7 – Tucker	2 – Tied	LionTree Arena (1,277); La Jolla, CA
February 3, 2024; 5:00 p.m., ESPN+		UC Riverside	W 76–70	14–9 (5–6)	26 – Allen-Eikens	12 – Jones	4 – Tied	Premier America Credit Union Arena (915); Northridge, CA
February 8, 2024; 7:00 p.m., ESPN+		Cal Poly	W 78–65	15–9 (6–6)	23 – Bostick	10 – Jones	8 – Hunt	Premier America Credit Union Arena (390); Northridge, CA
February 10, 2024; 7:00 p.m., ESPN+		at UC Santa Barbara	W 82–74	16–9 (7–6)	20 – Allen-Eikens	7 – Fofana	2 – Tied	The Thunderdome (1,619); Santa Barbara, CA
February 15, 2024; 7:00 p.m., ESPN+		at Cal State Bakersfield	W 76–71	17–9 (8–6)	27 – Bostick	5 – Tied	7 – Hunt	Icardo Center (984); Bakersfield, CA
February 17, 2024; 5:00 p.m., ESPN+		Long Beach State	L 73–87	17–10 (8–7)	21 – Allen-Eikens	10 – Fofana	5 – Allen-Eikens	Premier America Credit Union Arena (411); Northridge, CA
February 22, 2024; 7:00 p.m., ESPN+		UC Davis	L 65–66	17–11 (8–8)	23 – Bostick	10 – Fofana	6 – Hunt	Premier America Credit Union Arena (542); Northridge, CA
February 24, 2024; 6:00 p.m., ESPN+		at Cal State Fullerton	W 65–60	18–11 (9–8)	20 – Allen-Eikens	9 – Fofana	4 – Jones	Titan Gym (680); Fullerton, CA
February 29, 2024; 7:00 p.m., ESPN+		UC Irvine	L 64–89	18–12 (9–9)	20 – Bostick	7 – Tied	3 – Hunt	Premier America Credit Union Arena (542); Northridge, CA
March 2, 2024; 5:00 p.m., ESPN+		UC San Diego	L 69–79	18–13 (9–10)	19 – Jones	8 – Jones	6 – Hunt	Premier America Credit Union Arena (1,137); Northridge, CA
March 6, 2024; 9:00 p.m., ESPN+		at Hawai'i	L 70–72	18–14 (9–11)	34 – Allen-Eikens	9 – Allen-Eikens	4 – Bostick	Stan Sheriff Center (4,340); Honolulu, HI
Big West tournament
March 13, 2024; 8:30 pm, ESPN+	(7)	vs. (6) UC Santa Barbara; First Round	W 87–84 ^{OT}	19–14	24 – Jones	9 – Jones	6 – Bostick	Dollar Loan Center (717); Henderson, NV
March 14, 2024; 6:00 pm, ESPN+	(7)	vs. (3) Hawai'i; Quarterfinals	L 68–75	19–15	22 – Allen-Eikens	10 – Jones	8 – Hunt	Dollar Loan Center (831); Henderson, NV
*Non-conference game. ^{#}Rankings from AP Poll. (#) Tournament seedings in parentheses. All times are in Pacific Time.
