= 2023–24 Hawaii Rainbow Warriors basketball team =

American college basketball season

2023–24 Hawaii Rainbow Warriors basketball

Acrisure Invitational champions
- Conference: Big West Conference
- Record: 20–14 (11–9 Big West)
- Head coach: Eran Ganot (9th season)
- Associate head coach: John Montgomery
- Assistant coaches: Brad Davidson; Rob Jones; Cody Kelley
- Captains: Noel Coleman; Bernardo da Silva; JoVon McClanahan
- Home arena: Stan Sheriff Center (Capacity: 10,300)

2023–24 Big West men's basketball standings
	Conf.				Overall
Team	W		L	PCT	W		L	PCT
UC Irvine	17	–	3	.850	24	–	10	.706
UC San Diego*	15	–	5	.750	21	–	12	.636
UC Davis	14	–	6	.700	20	–	13	.606
Hawai'i	11	–	9	.550	20	–	14	.588
Long Beach State †	10	–	10	.500	21	–	15	.583
UC Riverside	10	–	10	.500	16	–	18	.471
UC Santa Barbara	9	–	11	.450	16	–	15	.516
Cal State Northridge	9	–	11	.450	19	–	15	.559
Cal State Bakersfield	8	–	12	.400	13	–	19	.406
Cal State Fullerton	7	–	13	.350	14	–	18	.438
Cal Poly	0	–	20	.000	4	–	28	.125
† 2024 Big West tournament winner * ineligible for the 2024 NCAA tournament due to transition period

The 2023–24 Hawaii Rainbow Warriors men's basketball team represented the University of Hawaiʻi at Mānoa during the 2023–24 NCAA Division I men's basketball season. The Rainbow Warriors, led by Eran Ganot in his ninth season, played their games at SimpliFi Arena at Stan Sheriff Center in Honolulu, Hawaii, as members of the Big West Conference.

The team claimed the Acrisure Invitational in November, the first mainland tournament title in program history, and advanced to the semifinals of the Big West tournament for the second time in three seasons after defeating CSUN in the quarterfinals, where they fell to UC Davis.

Despite a second consecutive 20-win season, the team decided not to pursue a bid to the postseason.

== Previous season ==
The Rainbow Warriors finished the 2022–23 season 22–11, 13–7 in Big West play, to finish in fourth place. In the Big West tournament, they were defeated by Cal State Fullerton in the quarterfinals.

== Roster ==
2023–24 Hawaii Rainbow Warriors men's basketball team
Players
Coaches

Pos.	#	Name	Height	Weight	Year	Previous school	Hometown
G	0	Kody Williams (W)	6 ft 0 in (1.83 m)	185 lb (84 kg)	So	South Kent School	Minnetonka, MN
F	1	Justin McKoy	6 ft 8 in (2.03 m)	230 lb (104 kg)	GS	North Carolina	Cary, NC
G	2	Tom Beattie	6 ft 4 in (1.93 m)	190 lb (86 kg)	Fr	Rosmini College	Auckland, New Zealand
G	3	JoVon McClanahan (C)	5 ft 10 in (1.78 m)	175 lb (79 kg)	Sr	Sheridan College (WY)	Vallejo, CA
G	4	Noel Coleman (C)	6 ft 2 in (1.88 m)	195 lb (88 kg)	Sr	San Diego	Leopoldsburg, Belgium
F	5	Bernardo da Silva (C)	6 ft 9 in (2.06 m)	215 lb (98 kg)	Sr	Wasatch Academy	Rio das Ostras, Brazil
G	10	Logan Robeson	6 ft 3 in (1.91 m)	190 lb (86 kg)	Fr	Campolindo HS	Moraga, CA
G	11	Matthue Cotton	6 ft 5 in (1.96 m)	200 lb (91 kg)	GS	Yale	Voorhees, NJ
F	13	Matija Svetozarevic	6 ft 8 in (2.03 m)	215 lb (98 kg)	Jr	Portland	Niš, Serbia
F	14	Harry Rouhliadeff	6 ft 9 in (2.06 m)	220 lb (100 kg)	So	Villanova College	Brisbane, Australia
G	22	Ryan Rapp	6 ft 5 in (1.96 m)	185 lb (84 kg)	Sr	Washington State	Melbourne, Australia
C	23	Mor Seck	7 ft 1 in (2.16 m)	225 lb (102 kg)	So	Prolific Prep	Dakar, Senegal
F	34	Akira Jacobs	6 ft 9 in (2.06 m)	205 lb (93 kg)	Fr	NBA Global Academy	Yokohama, Japan
G	55	Juan Munoz	6 ft 0 in (1.83 m)	175 lb (79 kg)	GS	Longwood	Morrisville, NC

Head coach

- Eran Ganot (Swarthmore)

Assistant coach(es)

- John Montgomery (Loyola Marymount)
  associate head coach
- Brad Davidson (Sydney)
- Rob Jones (Saint Mary's)
- Cody Kelley (Wyoming)

Strength and conditioning coach(es)

- Tanner Hull (Missouri)

Legend

- (C) Team captain
- (S) Suspended
- (I) Ineligible
- (W) Walk-on
- Injured
- Current redshirt

Roster

== Schedule ==
Date time, TV	Rank^{#}	Opponent^{#}	Result	Record	High points	High rebounds	High assists	Site (attendance) city, state
Exhibition
October 20, 2023*; 7:00 p.m., Spectrum Sports		No. 23 Saint Mary's; Charity Exhibition for Maui Wildfire Relief	L 58–92		16 – McClanahan	5 – Seck	2 – tied	Stan Sheriff Center (4,902); Honolulu, HI
Non-conference regular season
November 14, 2023*; 7:00 p.m., Spectrum Sports		UH Hilo	W 82–66	1–0	15 – McKoy	7 – da Silva	3 – Munoz	Stan Sheriff Center (3,827); Honolulu, HI
November 16, 2023*; 7:00 p.m., Spectrum Sports		Niagara	W 92–73	2–0	21 – Coleman	11 – McKoy	4 – McClanahan	Stan Sheriff Center (3,748); Honolulu, HI
November 21, 2023*; 8:30 p.m., Spectrum Sports		Northern Arizona	W 70–61	3–0	13 – McClanahan	7 – da Silva	5 – McClanahan	Stan Sheriff Center (3,853); Honolulu, HI
November 24, 2023*; 3:00 p.m.		vs. UT Rio Grande Valley; Acrisure Invitational semifinals	W 76–57	4–0	23 – Cotton	14 – McKoy	5 – McClanahan	Acrisure Arena (735); Thousand Palms, CA
November 25, 2023*; 5:30 p.m.		vs. San Diego; Acrisure Invitational championship game	W 77–66	5–0	26 – Coleman	5 – tied	4 – McClanahan	Acrisure Arena (1,293); Thousand Palms, CA
November 30, 2023*; 5:00 p.m., P12N		vs. Utah	L 66–79	5–1	14 – Coleman	6 – McClanahan	4 – Coleman	Delta Center (4,686); Salt Lake City, UT
December 3, 2023*; 5:00 p.m., Spectrum Sports		Central Arkansas	W 95–76	6–1	25 – Coleman	11 – da Silva	4 – tied	Stan Sheriff Center (5,714); Honolulu, HI
December 10, 2023*; 5:00 p.m., Spectrum Sports		Hawaii Pacific	W 78–53	7–1	15 – Munoz	7 – Beattie	4 – McClanahan	Stan Sheriff Center (4,102); Honolulu, HI
December 17, 2023*; 5:00 p.m., Spectrum Sports		Nevada	L 66–72	7–2	17 – tied	10 – da Silva	3 – Coleman	Stan Sheriff Center (4,794); Honolulu, HI
December 21, 2023*; 6:00 p.m., ESPN2		Portland; Diamond Head Classic quarterfinals	W 69–56	8–2	15 – Cotton	11 – da Silva	7 – McClanahan	Stan Sheriff Center (5,290); Honolulu, HI
December 22, 2023*; 6:00 p.m., ESPN2		Georgia Tech; Diamond Head Classic semifinals	L 68–73	8–3	19 – McClanahan	7 – McKoy	8 – McClanahan	Stan Sheriff Center (N/A); Honolulu, HI
December 24, 2023*; 1:30 p.m., ESPN2		TCU; Diamond Head Classic 3rd-place game	L 51–65	8–4	19 – Coleman	5 – tied	2 – tied	Stan Sheriff Center (N/A); Honolulu, HI
Big West regular season
December 30, 2023; 7:00 p.m., Spectrum Sports		Cal State Fullerton	L 61–63 ^{OT}	8–5 (0–1)	15 – da Silva	10 – da Silva	4 – McClanahan	Stan Sheriff Center (5,171); Honolulu, HI
January 4, 2024; 5:00 p.m., ESPN+		at Cal State Bakersfield	W 78–67	9–5 (1–1)	19 – McClanahan	8 – da Silva	4 – McClanahan	Icardo Center (1,129); Bakersfield, CA
January 6, 2024; 3:00 p.m., ESPN+		at CSUN	L 66–76	9–6 (1–2)	23 – McClanahan	7 – da Silva	3 – tied	Premier America Credit Union Arena (657); Northridge, CA
January 11, 2024; 7:00 p.m., Spectrum Sports		UC Irvine	L 50–60	9–7 (1–3)	17 – da Silva	14 – da Silva	3 – tied	Stan Sheriff Center (4,453); Honolulu, HI
January 13, 2024; 7:00 p.m., Spectrum Sports		UC Riverside	W 63–56	10–7 (2–3)	14 – McClanahan	8 – Coleman	3 – tied	Stan Sheriff Center (4,886); Honolulu, HI
January 18, 2024; 5:00 p.m., Spectrum SportsNet		at Long Beach State	L 71–79	10–8 (2–4)	22 – McKoy	7 – Cotton	5 – Coleman	Walter Pyramid (1,835); Long Beach, CA
January 20, 2024; 2:00 p.m., ESPN+		at UC San Diego	L 61–67	10–9 (2–5)	21 – Munoz	10 – McKoy	5 – McClanahan	LionTree Arena (1,558); La Jolla, CA
January 25, 2024; 7:00 p.m., Spectrum Sports		UC Santa Barbara	L 61–78	10–10 (2–6)	19 – Coleman	5 – McKoy	3 – Munoz	Stan Sheriff Center (4,279); Honolulu, HI
January 27, 2024; 7:00 p.m., Spectrum Sports		Cal Poly	W 83–73	11–10 (3–6)	23 – Coleman	10 – da Silva	3 – Munoz	Stan Sheriff Center (4,921); Honolulu, HI
February 1, 2024; 5:00 p.m., ESPN+		at Cal State Fullerton	W 76–68	12–10 (4–6)	21 – Coleman	6 – tied	4 – McClanahan	Titan Gym (1,339); Fullerton, CA
February 3, 2024; 5:00 p.m., ESPN+		at UC Irvine	L 68–93	12–11 (4–7)	19 – da Silva	8 – da Silva	5 – McClanahan	Bren Events Center (3,042); Irvine, CA
February 8, 2024; 7:00 p.m., Spectrum Sports		UC San Diego	W 94–86 ^{OT}	13–11 (5–7)	22 – McKoy	9 – McKoy	4 – McKoy	Stan Sheriff Center (4,249); Honolulu, HI
February 10, 2024; 7:00 p.m., Spectrum Sports		UC Davis	W 87–70	14–11 (6–7)	19 – da Silva	12 – da Silva	4 – da Silva	Stan Sheriff Center (5,576); Honolulu, HI
February 15, 2024; 5:00 p.m., ESPN+		at Cal Poly	W 80–51	15–11 (7–7)	20 – Munoz	6 – tied	3 – Williams	Mott Athletics Center (1,122); San Luis Obispo, CA
February 17, 2024; 11:00 a.m., Spectrum SportsNet		at UC Santa Barbara	L 71–77	15–12 (7–8)	15 – Beattie	7 – da Silva	3 – tied	The Thunderdome (1,427); Santa Barbara, CA
February 24, 2024; 7:00 p.m., Spectrum Sports		Long Beach State	W 73–65	16–12 (8–8)	26 – McKoy	6 – tied	3 – tied	Stan Sheriff Center (5,822); Honolulu, HI
February 29, 2024; 4:00 p.m., ESPN+		at UC Davis	L 63–75	16–13 (8–9)	20 – da Silva	9 – McKoy	3 – McKoy	University Credit Union Center (2,398); Davis, CA
March 2, 2024; 3:00 p.m., ESPN+		at UC Riverside	W 76–73 ^{OT}	17–13 (9–9)	31 – Coleman	9 – tied	3 – da Silva	SRC Arena (632); Riverside, CA
March 6, 2024; 7:00 p.m., Spectrum Sports		CSUN	W 72–70	18–13 (10–9)	18 – da Silva	12 – da Silva	4 – tied	Stan Sheriff Center (4,340); Honolulu, HI
March 9, 2024; 7:00 p.m., Spectrum Sports		Cal State Bakersfield	W 74–57	19–13 (11–9)	23 – McKoy	8 – McKoy	3 – McClanahan	Stan Sheriff Center (6,176); Honolulu, HI
Big West tournament
March 14, 2024; 3:00 pm, ESPN+	(3)	vs. (7) Cal State Northridge; Quarterfinals	W 75–68	20–13	16 – McKoy	9 – da Silva	7 – McClanahan	Dollar Loan Center (831); Henderson, NV
March 15, 2024; 5:30 pm, ESPN2	(3)	vs. (2) UC Davis; Semifinals	L 65–68	20–14	14 – da Silva	6 – McKoy	3 – Munoz	Dollar Loan Center (1,919); Henderson, NV
*Non-conference game. ^{#}Rankings from AP poll. (#) Tournament seedings in parentheses. All times are in Hawaii–Aleutian.
