= 2023–24 UC Irvine Anteaters men's basketball team =

American college basketball season

2023–24 UC Irvine Anteaters men's basketball

Big West regular season champions 2023 William Jones Cup champions Ball Dawgs Classic champions

NIT, First Round
- Conference: Big West Conference
- Record: 24–10 (17–3 Big West)
- Head coach: Russell Turner (14th season)
- Assistant coaches: Ryan Badrtalei (15th season); Michael Wilder (8th season); Alex Young (4th season)
- Home arena: Bren Events Center (Capacity: 5,000)

2023–24 Big West men's basketball standings
	Conf.				Overall
Team	W		L	PCT	W		L	PCT
UC Irvine	17	–	3	.850	24	–	10	.706
UC San Diego*	15	–	5	.750	21	–	12	.636
UC Davis	14	–	6	.700	20	–	13	.606
Hawai'i	11	–	9	.550	20	–	14	.588
Long Beach State †	10	–	10	.500	21	–	15	.583
UC Riverside	10	–	10	.500	16	–	18	.471
UC Santa Barbara	9	–	11	.450	16	–	15	.516
Cal State Northridge	9	–	11	.450	19	–	15	.559
Cal State Bakersfield	8	–	12	.400	13	–	19	.406
Cal State Fullerton	7	–	13	.350	14	–	18	.438
Cal Poly	0	–	20	.000	4	–	28	.125
† 2024 Big West tournament winner * ineligible for the 2024 NCAA tournament due to transition period

The 2023–24 UC Irvine Anteaters men's basketball team represented the University of California, Irvine in the 2023–24 NCAA Division I men's basketball season. They played their home games at the Bren Events Center in Irvine, California as a member of the Big West Conference. The Anteaters were led by 14th-year head coach Russell Turner.

== Previous season ==
Despite being picked to finish fourth in the Big West Pre-Season Poll, the Anteaters finished the 2022–23 season 23–12, 15–5 to finish in a tie for 1st in Big West play, holding the tie-breaker over UC Santa Barbara. During the regular season, the Anteaters defeated then #21 Oregon 69–56 in Eugene on November 22, 2022, for the program's first victory over a ranked opponent during the regular season since 2005 when they defeated #15 Stanford. The Anteaters would lose to then-ranked #24 San Diego State 69–72 in San Diego holding the lead into the final minutes of the game. After defeating Cal State Bakersfield in the quarterfinals, they lost to Cal State Fullerton in the semifinals of the Big West tournament. The team also won the 2022 Las Vegas Holiday Classic Invite. The team won the Big West auto-bid for the 2023 NIT where the matched with Oregon again and were defeated 58–84. Russell Turner won his 250th game on December 31, 2022, vs Cal State Bakersfield. In that game, the Anteaters broke the school record for attempted free-throws making 30-51 attempts. The team recorded its 13th 20 win season, 8th under Turner.

== Offseason ==
=== Departures ===
Irvine lost its top two scorers from the 2022–23 season, Dawson Baker (15.3 points per game) and DJ Davis (15.0 ppg), to the NCAA transfer portal in the spring of 2023. Baker transferred to BYU and Davis transferred to Butler. Junior forward Chazz Hutchison also entered the portal and senior forward JC Butler graduated. Emilus Buktus was with the team in the summer playing in the Jack Jones Cup, but left the team prior to the regular season.

Departures
Name	Number	Pos.	Height	Weight	Year	Hometown	Reason for departure
JC Butler	0	F	6'5"	195	Senior	Racine, WI	Graduated
Dawson Baker	1	G	6'4"	190	Junior	Coto de Caza, CA	Transferred to BYU
Chazz Hutchison	5	F	6'9"	215	Junior	Mission Viejo, CA	Transferred to Southern Utah
DJ Davis	22	G	6'1"	170	Junior	Moreno Valley, CA	Transferred to Butler

=== Incoming transfers ===
Dylan Thoerner, a graduate guard from Tufts and Irvine native, transferred to the program, ultimately bringing UC Irvine's transfer portal turnover to a net loss of two.

Incoming transfers
Name	Number	Pos.	Height	Weight	Year	Hometown	Previous School
Dylan Thoerner	0	G	6'6"	200	Graduate	Irvine, CA	Tufts

=== Recruits ===
Irvine's first commitment of the 2023 class came three years prior from 6-foot-10 forward Carter Welling, the brother of Anteaters forward Hayden Welling. He graduated high school in 2021 and went on a two-year LDS mission before beginning at UC Irvine. On May 2, 2023, 6-foot-4 guard Ben Egbo committed to UCI as a walk-on. On May 11, nationally ranked guard prospect Jurian Dixon committed to the team. UCI rounded out its recruiting class with a June 13 commitment from Derin Saran, a guard originally from Turkey.

College recruiting information
Name	Hometown	School	Height	Weight	Commit date
Jurian Dixon; G	San Diego, CA	St. Augustine High School	6 ft 4 in (1.93 m)	195 lb (88 kg)	May 11, 2023
Jurian Dixon; G	Recruit ratings: Rivals: 247Sports: ESPN:				
Ben Egbo; G	Gilbert, AZ	Perry High School	6 ft 4 in (1.93 m)	200 lb (91 kg)	May 2, 2023
Ben Egbo; G	Recruit ratings: No ratings found				
Derin Saran; G	Istanbul, Turkey	Asheville School	6 ft 4 in (1.93 m)	190 lb (86 kg)	Jun 13, 2023
Derin Saran; G	Recruit ratings: No ratings found				
Carter Welling; F	Draper, UT	Corner Canyon High School	6 ft 10 in (2.08 m)	225 lb (102 kg)	Nov 5, 2020
Carter Welling; F	Recruit ratings: No ratings found				
Overall recruit ranking:
Note: In many cases, Scout, Rivals, 247Sports, On3, and ESPN may conflict in their listings of height and weight.; In these cases, the average was taken. ESPN grades are on a 100-point scale.; Sources:

== Roster ==
2022–23 UC Irvine Anteaters men's basketball team
Players
Coaches

Pos.	#	Name	Height	Weight	Year	Previous school	Hometown
G	0	Dylan Thoerner	6 ft 6 in (1.98 m)	200 lb (91 kg)		Tufts University	Irvine, California
G	1	Derin Saran	6 ft 4 in (1.93 m)	177 lb (80 kg)	Fr	Asheville School	Istanbul, Turkey
G	2	Justin Hohn	6 ft 2 in (1.88 m)	185 lb (84 kg)	RS Sr	Tea High School	Sioux Falls, South Dakota
G	3	Pierre Crockrell II	6 ft 0 in (1.83 m)	180 lb (82 kg)	Sr	Pacific	Tacoma, Washington
G	4	Andre Henry	6 ft 4 in (1.93 m)	180 lb (82 kg)	Sr	Saint Francis High School	La Cañada Flintridge, California
F	5	Ben Egbo	6 ft 5 in (1.96 m)	195 lb (88 kg)	Fr	Perry High School	Chandler, Arizona
G	10	Ofure Ujadughele (W)	6 ft 5 in (1.96 m)	210 lb (95 kg)	RS Sr	Chino Hills High School	Chino Hills, California
F	11	Devin Tillis	6 ft 6 in (1.98 m)	210 lb (95 kg)	RS Jr	UNLV	Los Angeles, California
F	13	Hayden Welling	6 ft 8 in (2.03 m)	210 lb (95 kg)	So	Corner Canyon High School	Draper, Utah
C	15	Bent Leuchten	7 ft 0 in (2.13 m)	258 lb (117 kg)	Jr	Josef-Effner Gymnasium	Karlsfeld, Bavaria, Germany
G	21	Langston Redfield (W)	6 ft 3 in (1.91 m)	185 lb (84 kg)	RS So	Capistrano Valley High School	Mission Viejo, California
F	22	Carter Welling	6 ft 11 in (2.11 m)	250 lb (113 kg)	Fr	Corner Canyon High School	Draper, Utah
G/F	23	Emilis Butkus	6 ft 5 in (1.96 m)	215 lb (98 kg)	So	International Basketball Academy Munich	Vilnius, Lithuania
G	24	Jurian Dixon	6 ft 5 in (1.96 m)	198 lb (90 kg)	Fr	St. Augustine High School	San Diego, California
F	31	Dean Keeler (W)	6 ft 11 in (2.11 m)	240 lb (109 kg)	Sr	Marina High School	Westminster, California
F/C	33	Eli Chol	6 ft 11 in (2.11 m)	175 lb (79 kg)	So	Forsyth Central High School	Cumming, Georgia
F	43	Akiva McBirney-Griffin	6 ft 9 in (2.06 m)	220 lb (100 kg)	RS So	St John's College, Hamilton	Hamilton, New Zealand

Head coach

- Russell Turner (Hampden–Sydney)

Assistant coach(es)

- Ryan Badrtalei (UCLA)
- Michael Wilder (UC Irvine)
- Alex Young (UC Irvine)

Legend

- (C) Team captain
- (S) Suspended
- (I) Ineligible
- (W) Walk-on
- Injured
- Current redshirt

Roster

== Schedule and results ==
Date time, TV	Rank^{#}	Opponent^{#}	Result	Record	High points	High rebounds	High assists	Site (attendance) city, state
2023 William Jones Cup
August 12, 2023*; 12:00 am, Twitch		vs. Qatar	W 105–38	1–0	19 – Henry	6 – Tied	11 – Crockrell II	Taipei Heping Gymnasium; Taipei, Taiwan
August 13, 2023*; 12:00 am, Twitch		vs. UAE	W 109–49	2–0	22 – Saran	9 – Chol	6 – Crockrell II	Taipei Heping Gymnasium; Taipei, Taiwan
August 14, 2023*; 12:00 am, Twitch		vs. Japan U20	W 108–47	3–0	16 – Saran	10 – Saran	6 – Redfield	Taipei Heping Gymnasium; Taipei, Taiwan
August 14, 2023*; 10:00 pm, Twitch		vs. South Korea (Anyang KGC)	W 87–82	4–0	14 – Crockrell II	13 – Keeler	10 – Crockrell II	Taipei Heping Gymnasium; Taipei, Taiwan
August 16, 2023*; 4:00 am, YouTube		at Chinese Taipei (B/White)	W 117–59	5–0	18 – Hohn	12 – Leuchten	14 – Crockrell II	Taipei Heping Gymnasium; Taipei, Taiwan
August 18, 2023*; 2:00 am, YouTube		vs. Iran B	W 80–48	6–0	16 – Henry	9 – Saran	4 – Ujadughele	Taipei Heping Gymnasium; Taipei, Taiwan
August 19, 2023*; 4:00 am, Twitch		at Chinese Taipei (A/Blue)	W 95–80	7–0	19 – Thoerner	9 – Ujadughele	9 – Ujadughele	Taipei Heping Gymnasium; Taipei, Taiwan
August 20, 2023*; 12:00 am, Twitch		vs. Philippines (Rain or Shine Elasto Painters)	W 115–61	8–0	23 – Saran	19 – Saran	6 – Hohn	Taipei Heping Gymnasium; Taipei, Taiwan
Exhibition
November 3, 2023*; 7:00 p.m., ESPN+		Cal State San Marcos	W 75–57		11 – Tillis	9 – Tillis	5 – Crockrell II	Bren Events Center (1,680); Irvine, CA
Non-conference regular season
November 7, 2023*; 7:00 p.m., Mountain West Network		at San Jose State	L 64–72	0–1	14 – Leuchten	6 – Tied	5 – Crockrell II	Provident Credit Union Event Center (1,821); San Jose, CA
November 11, 2023*; 7:00 p.m., ESPN+		New Mexico State	W 91–74	1–1	19 – Henry	10 – Tillis	8 – Crockrell II	Bren Events Center (2,731); Irvine, CA
November 14, 2023*; 8:00 p.m., P12N		at No. 16 USC	W 70–60	2–1	25 – Hohn	10 – Tillis	6 – Crockrell II	Galen Center (4,730); Los Angeles, CA
November 17, 2023*; 7:00 p.m., ESPN+		Occidental	W 111–51	3–1	24 – Henry	8 – Ujadughele	6 – Tied	Bren Events Center (1,432); Irvine, CA
November 21, 2023*; 5:45 p.m., FloHoops		vs. Pepperdine; Ball Dawgs Classic	W 76–60	4–1	16 – Saran	8 – Saran	5 – Tillis	Dollar Loan Center (1,007); Henderson, NV
November 22, 2023*; 8:45 p.m., FloHoops		vs. Toledo; Ball Dawgs Classic	W 77–71	5–1	24 – Tillis	7 – Keeler	4 – Crockrell II	Dollar Loan Center (1,634); Henderson, NV
November 24, 2023*; 1:15 p.m., FloHoops		vs. Rice; Ball Dawgs Classic	W 83–68	6–1	18 – Hohn	9 – Tied	4 – Ujadughele	Dollar Loan Center (1,584); Henderson, NV
November 29, 2023*; 4:00 p.m., ESPN+		at Duquesne	L 62–66	6–2	13 – Tied	7 – Tillis	5 – Crockrell II	UPMC Cooper Fieldhouse (2,193); Pittsburgh, PA
December 2, 2023*; 6:00 p.m., Mountain West Network		at Utah State	L 69–79	6–3	21 – Hohn	7 – Saran	8 – Crockrell II	Smith Spectrum (7,880); Logan, UT
December 9, 2023*; 7:30 p.m., FS1		at No. 25 San Diego State	L 62–63	6–4	16 – Hohn	7 – Henry	3 – Crockrell II	Viejas Arena (12,414); San Diego, CA
December 16, 2023*; 7:00 p.m., ESPN+		South Dakota	W 121–78	7–4	22 – Keeler	8 – Keeler	11 – Crockrell II	Bren Events Center (1,923); Irvine, CA
December 20, 2023*; 6:00 p.m., Mountain West Network		at New Mexico	L 65–78	7–5	14 – Hohn	6 – Tied	6 – Crockrell II	The Pit (11,536); Albuquerque, NM
Big West regular season
December 28, 2023; 7:00 p.m., ESPN+		UC Riverside	W 73–66	8–5 (1–0)	23 – Henry	10 – Tillis	7 – Crockrell II	Bren Events Center (2,345); Irvine, CA
December 30, 2023; 7:00 p.m., ESPN+		at Cal State Bakersfield	W 75–56	9–5 (2–0)	18 – Hohn	8 – Leuchten	16 – Crockrell II	Icardo Center (1,081); Bakersfield, CA
January 4, 2024; 7:00 p.m., ESPN+		Cal State Fullerton	W 75–67	10–5 (3–0)	17 – Tied	5 – Tied	4 – Tillis	Bren Events Center (1,934); Irvine, CA
January 6, 2024; 1:00 p.m., SNLA ESPN+		UC Davis	W 74–71 ^{OT}	11–5 (4–0)	14 – Tied	10 – Tillis	5 – Crockrell II	Bren Events Center (2,232); Irvine, CA
January 11, 2024; 9:00 p.m., Spectrum OC16, ESPN+		at Hawai'i	W 60–50	12–5 (5–0)	16 – Crockrell II	8 – Henry	3 – Crockrell II	Stan Sheriff Center (4,453); Honolulu, HI
January 18, 2024; 7:00 p.m., ESPN+		UC San Diego	W 76–65	13–5 (6–0)	18 – Henry	9 – Tillis	5 – Hohn	Bren Events Center (3,108); Irvine, CA
January 20, 2024; 2:00 p.m., ESPN+		at UC Davis	L 52–54	13–6 (6–1)	12 – Henry	8 – Keeler	7 – Crockrell II	University Credit Union Center (2,153); Davis, CA
January 25, 2024; 7:00 p.m., ESPN+		at Long Beach State; Black & Blue Rivalry	W 72–61	14–6 (7–1)	13 – Thoerner	6 – Tied	11 – Crockrell II	Walter Pyramid (3,024); Long Beach, CA
January 27, 2024; 7:00 p.m., ESPN+		CSUN	W 77–72	15–6 (8–1)	22 – Hohn	14 – Keeler	4 – Tillis	Bren Events Center (3,441); Irvine, CA
February 1, 2024; 7:00 p.m., ESPNU Wildcard, ESPN+		at Cal Poly	W 73–59	16–6 (9–1)	17 – Saran	9 – Tied	7 – Crockrell II	Mott Athletics Center (1,097); San Luis Obispo, CA
February 3, 2024; 7:00 p.m., ESPN+		Hawai'i	W 93–68	17–6 (10–1)	15 – Leuchten	7 – Welling	7 – Crockrell II	Bren Events Center (3,042); Irvine, CA
February 8, 2024; 7:00 p.m., ESPN+		at UC Santa Barbara	W 76–61	18–6 (11–1)	14 – Crockrell II	8 – Welling	7 – Crockrell II	The Thunderdome (1,992); Santa Barbara, CA
February 10, 2024; 5:00 p.m., ESPN+		at UC Riverside	L 78–88	18–7 (11–2)	14 – Tied	6 – Tied	5 – Crockrell II	SRC Arena (607); Riverside, CA
February 17, 2024; 7:00 p.m., ESPN+		Cal State Bakersfield	W 77–71	19–7 (12–2)	14 – Leuchten	9 – Tillis	7 – Crockrell II	Bren Events Center (2,129); Irvine, CA
February 22, 2024; 7:00 p.m., ESPNU Wildcard, ESPN+		UC Santa Barbara	W 81–69	20–7 (13–2)	19 – Hohn	8 – Tillis	5 – Crockrell II	Bren Events Center (3,272); Irivne, CA
February 24, 2024; 1:00 p.m., SNLA ESPN+		at UC San Diego	L 88–92 ^{OT}	20–8 (13–3)	18 – Henry	8 – Tillis	4 – Tillis	LionTree Arena (1,864); La Jolla, CA
February 29, 2024; 7:00 p.m., ESPN+		at CSUN	W 89–64	21–8 (14–3)	16 – Leuchten	8 – Keeler	11 – Crockrell II	Premier America Credit Union Arena (542); Northridge, CA
March 2, 2024; 7:00 p.m., ESPN2 Wildcard, ESPN+		Long Beach State; Black & Blue Rivalry	W 82–61	22–8 (15–3)	13 – Hohn	8 – Saran	11 – Crockrell II	Bren Events Center (4,799); Irvine, CA
March 7, 2024; 7:00 p.m., ESPN+		Cal Poly	W 82–68	23–8 (16–3)	16 – Henry	5 – Leuchten	11 – Crockrell II	Bren Events Center (2,785); Irvine, CA
March 9, 2024; 6:00 p.m., ESPN+		at Cal State Fullerton	W 81–71	24–8 (17–3)	17 – Leuchten	10 – Tillis	3 – Crockrell II	Titan Gym (1,076); Fullerton, CA
Big West tournament
March 15, 2024; 6:00 p.m., ESPN+	(1)	vs. (4) Long Beach State; Semifinals	L 79–83	24–9	19 – Hohn	9 – Leuchten	9 – Crockrell II	Dollar Loan Center; Henderson, NV
National Invitation Tournament
March 19, 2024*; 7:00 p.m., ESPN2		at (2) Utah; First Round - Villanova Bracket	L 75–84	24–10	16 – Saran	7 – Tillis	5 – Crockrell II	Jon M. Huntsman Center (3,137); Salt Lake City, UT
*Non-conference game. ^{#}Rankings from AP Poll. (#) Tournament seedings in parentheses.
