= 2023–24 UC Riverside Highlanders men's basketball team =

American college basketball season

2023–24 UC Riverside Highlanders men's basketball
- Conference: Big West Conference
- Record: 16–18 (10–10 Big West)
- Head coach: Mike Magpayo (4th season)
- Assistant coaches: Eddie Hill; Troy Hammel; Dustin Yoder
- Home arena: SRC Arena (Capacity: 3,168)

2023–24 Big West men's basketball standings
	Conf.				Overall
Team	W		L	PCT	W		L	PCT
UC Irvine	17	–	3	.850	24	–	10	.706
UC San Diego*	15	–	5	.750	21	–	12	.636
UC Davis	14	–	6	.700	20	–	13	.606
Hawai'i	11	–	9	.550	20	–	14	.588
Long Beach State †	10	–	10	.500	21	–	15	.583
UC Riverside	10	–	10	.500	16	–	18	.471
UC Santa Barbara	9	–	11	.450	16	–	15	.516
Cal State Northridge	9	–	11	.450	19	–	15	.559
Cal State Bakersfield	8	–	12	.400	13	–	19	.406
Cal State Fullerton	7	–	13	.350	14	–	18	.438
Cal Poly	0	–	20	.000	4	–	28	.125
† 2024 Big West tournament winner * ineligible for the 2024 NCAA tournament due to transition period

The 2023–24 UC Riverside Highlanders men's basketball team represented the University of California, Riverside in the 2023–24 NCAA Division I men's basketball season. They were led by fourth-year head coach Mike Magpayo and played their games at the SRC Arena as members of the Big West Conference.

== Previous season ==
The Highlanders finished the 2022–23 season 22–12, 14–6 in conference play to finish in third place. In the Big West tournament, the team won their quarterfinals game against UC Davis before losing their semi-finals matchup against UC Santa Barbara to end their season.

== Roster ==
2023–24 UC Riverside Highlanders men's basketball team
Players
Coaches

Pos.	#	Name	Height	Weight	Year	Hometown
F	0	Kyle Owens	6 ft 8 in (2.03 m)	—	GS	Calabasas, CA
C	1	Ben Griscti	6 ft 11 in (2.11 m)	—	Jr	Adelaide, Australia
F	2	Kaleb Smith	6 ft 9 in (2.06 m)	—	RS Fr	Rancho Cucamonga, CA
G	3	Isaiah Moses	6 ft 1 in (1.85 m)	—	RS So	Anchorage, AK
G	4	Gavin Davis	6 ft 5 in (1.96 m)	—	Jr	Carson, CA
G	6	Jayden Mojica	6 ft 2 in (1.88 m)	—	Fr	El Sereno, CA
G/F	10	Niyi Olabode	6 ft 5 in (1.96 m)	—	Jr	Orinda, CA
G	11	Nate Pickens	6 ft 3 in (1.91 m)	—	So	El Mirage, AZ
C	12	Jhaylon Martinez	6 ft 11 in (2.11 m)	—	RS Jr	Vallejo, CA
F	13	Vladimer Salaridze	6 ft 7 in (2.01 m)	—	RS Jr	Tbilisi, Georgia
F	14	Wil Tattersall	6 ft 7 in (2.01 m)	—	Sr	Melbourne, Australia
G	21	Chip Brunt	6 ft 4 in (1.93 m)	—	Fr	Memphis, TN
F	22	Luke Turner	6 ft 7 in (2.01 m)	—	Jr	Temecula, CA
F	24	Barrington Hargress	6 ft 0 in (1.83 m)	—		Inglewood, CA
F	45	Clancy Bird	6 ft 8 in (2.03 m)	—	RS Fr	Sydney, Australia

Head coach

- Mike Magpayo (UC Santa Barbara)

Assistant coach(es)

- Eddie Hill (Washington State)
- Troy Hammel (Merrimack)
- Dustin Yoder (Illinois)

Legend

- (C) Team captain
- (S) Suspended
- (I) Ineligible
- (W) Walk-on
- Injured
- Current redshirt

Roster
Last update: September 23, 2024

== Schedule and results ==
Date time, TV	Rank^{#}	Opponent^{#}	Result	Record	High points	High rebounds	High assists	Site (attendance) city, state
Regular season
November 7, 2023*; 7:00 p.m., ESPN+		UC Merced	W 76–69	1–0	16 – Hargress	10 – Martinez	4 – Pickens	SRC Arena (839); Riverside, CA
November 10, 2023*; 7:00 p.m., Pac-12 Mountain		at Utah	L 53–82	1–1	12 – Moses	7 – Griscti	6 – Hargress	Jon M. Huntsman Center (7,565); Salt Lake City, UT
November 12, 2023*; 2:00 p.m., ESPN+		at Portland	L 65–76	1–2	17 – Hargress	7 – Owens	6 – Moses	Chiles Center (1,187); Portland, OR
November 17, 2023*; 5:00 p.m., ACC Network		at No. 20 North Carolina	L 52–77	1–3	14 – Griscti	7 – Tattersall	5 – tied	Dean Smith Center (18,226); Chapel Hill, NC
November 21, 2023*; 6:00 p.m.		vs. Green Bay	W 74–68	2–3	22 – Moses	7 – Owens	6 – Moses	Worthington Arena (150); Bozeman, MT
November 22, 2023*; 7:00 p.m., ESPN+		at Montana State	L 68–69	2–4	17 – Moses	5 – tied	7 – Hargress	Worthington Arena (2,484); Bozeman, MT
November 26, 2023*; 2:00 p.m., ESPN+		Bethesda	W 109–63	3–4	14 – Griscti	10 – Martinez	8 – Moses	SRC Arena (235); Riverside, CA
November 30, 2023*; 8:00 p.m., Pac-12 Network		at UCLA	L 65–66	3–5	21 – Moses	9 – Owens	8 – Hargress	Pauley Pavilion (6,609); Los Angeles, CA
December 3, 2023*; 4:00 p.m., ESPN+		North Dakota	W 68–62	4–5	17 – Moses	8 – Moses	7 – Moses	SRC Arena (261); Riverside, CA
December 6, 2023*; 7:00 p.m., Pac-12 Network		at Washington State	L 49–86	4–6	17 – Moses	4 – tied	5 – Pickens	Beasley Coliseum (2,057); Pullman, WA
December 16, 2023*; 5:00 p.m.		California Baptist	L 69–70	4–7	19 – Hargress	9 – Griscti	6 – Moses	SRC Arena (669); Riverside, CA
December 21, 2023*; 5:00 p.m.		Idaho	W 82–67	5–7	19 – Griscti	11 – Pickens	9 – Moses	SRC Arena (347); Riverside, CA
Big West regular season
December 28, 2023; 7:00 p.m., ESPN+		at UC Irvine	L 66–73	5–8 (0–1)	18 – Griscti	7 – Owens	7 – Moses	Bren Events Center (2,345); Irvine, CA
December 30, 2023; 5:00 p.m., ESPN+		UC Santa Barbara	W 79–77	6–8 (1–1)	26 – Hargress	7 – Tattersall	4 – Hargress	SRC Arena (375); Riverside, CA
January 4, 2023; 7:00 p.m., ESPN+		UC Davis	L 63–83	6–9 (1–2)	17 – Owens	10 – Owens	7 – Moses	SRC Arena (257); Riverside, CA
January 6, 2024; 4:00 p.m., ESPN+		at Long Beach State	L 75–83	6–10 (1–3)	19 – tied	8 – Hargress	3 – tied	Walter Pyramid (2,546); Long Beach, CA
January 11, 2024; 7:00 p.m., ESPN+		Cal Poly	W 71–56	7–10 (2–3)	15 – Moses	10 – Owens	7 – Hargress	SRC Arena (512); Riverside, CA
January 13, 2024; 9:00 p.m., ESPN+		at Hawaii	L 56–63	7–11 (2–4)	18 – Hargress	8 – Smith	3 – tied	Stan Sheriff Center (4,886); Honolulu, HI
January 18, 2024; 7:00 p.m., ESPN+		at Cal State Bakersfield	L 56–80	7–12 (2–5)	16 – Griscti	5 – tied	3 – Hargress	Icardo Center (896); Bakersfield, CA
January 20, 2024; 5:00 p.m., ESPN+		Cal State Northridge	W 82–63	8–12 (3–5)	30 – Moses	11 – Salaridze	8 – tied	SRC Arena (469); Riverside, CA
January 25, 2024; 7:00 p.m., ESPN+		at UC San Diego	L 65–66	8–13 (3–6)	19 – Owens	14 – Smith	6 – Moses	LionTree Arena (3,083); La Jolla, CA
January 27, 2024; 1:00 p.m., Spectrum SportsNet		Long Beach State	L 53–65	8–14 (3–7)	16 – Hargress	8 – Smith	4 – Moses	SRC Arena (573); Riverside, CA
February 3, 2024; 5:00 p.m., ESPN+		at Cal State Northridge	L 70–76	8–15 (3–8)	20 – Hargress	12 – Owens	5 – tied	Premier America Credit Union Arena (915); Northridge, CA
February 8, 2024; 7:00 p.m., ESPN+		Cal State Bakersfield	W 65–63	9–15 (4–8)	18 – Griscti	9 – Owens	4 – Hargress	SRC Arena (565); Riverside, CA
February 10, 2024; 5:00 p.m., ESPN+		UC Irvine	W 88–78	10–15 (5–8)	26 – Griscti	7 – Owens	8 – Hargress	SRC Arena (607); Riverside, CA
February 15, 2024; 7:00 p.m., ESPN+		at Cal State Fullerton	W 81–73	11–15 (6–8)	21 – Hargress	9 – Smith	6 – Hargress	Titan Gym (633); Fullerton, CA
February 17, 2024; 5:00 p.m., ESPN+		at UC Davis	W 67–61	12–15 (7–8)	18 – Hargress	9 – Owens	6 – Hargress	University Credit Union Center (2,031); Davis, CA
February 22, 2024; 7:00 p.m., ESPN+		UC San Diego	L 65–77	12–16 (7–9)	18 – Smith	6 – tied	6 – Hargress	SRC Arena (703); Riverside, CA
February 24, 2024; 7:00 p.m., ESPN+		at Cal Poly	W 84–78	13–16 (8–9)	20 – Hargress	8 – Owens	4 – tied	Mott Athletics Center (1,428); San Luis Obispo, CA
March 2, 2024; 5:00 p.m., ESPN+		Hawai'i	L 73–76 ^{OT}	13–17 (8–10)	16 – Pickens	12 – Owens	5 – Hargress	SRC Arena (632); Riverside, CA
March 7, 2024; 7:00 p.m., ESPN+		Cal State Fullerton	W 84–74	14–17 (9–10)	20 – Pickens	10 – Smith	5 – Hargress	SRC Arena (754); Riverside, CA
March 9, 2024; 7:00 p.m., ESPN+		at UC Santa Barbara	W 81–64	15–17 (10–10)	28 – Smith	8 – Salaridze	7 – Hargress	The Thunderdome (2,702); Santa Barbara, CA
Big West tournament
March 13, 2024; 6:00 p.m., ESPN+	(5)	vs. (8) Cal State Bakersfield; First round	W 83–78	16–17	20 – Hargress	5 – Smith	6 – Hargress	Dollar Loan Center; Henderson, NV
March 14, 2024; 8:30 p.m., ESPN+	(5)	vs. (4) Long Beach State; Quarterfinals	L 67–86	16–18	17 – Salaridze	7 – Smith	4 – Hargress	Dollar Loan Center (1,227); Henderson, NV
*Non-conference game. ^{#}Rankings from AP poll. (#) Tournament seedings in parentheses. All times are in Pacific.
