= 2023–24 UC San Diego Tritons men's basketball team =

Basketball team season

2023–24 UC San Diego Tritons men's basketball

CBI, First Round
- Conference: Big West Conference
- Record: 21–12 (15–5 Big West)
- Head coach: Eric Olen (11th season)
- Associate head coach: Clint Allard
- Assistant coaches: Tom Tankelewicz; Steven Aldridge; Sam Stapleton; Mikey Howell
- Home arena: LionTree Arena

2023–24 Big West men's basketball standings
| | Conf. | | | | Overall |
| Team | W | | L | PCT | W | | L | PCT |
|---|---|---|---|---|---|---|---|---|
| UC Irvine | 17 | – | 3 | .850 | 24 | – | 10 | .706 |
| UC San Diego* | 15 | – | 5 | .750 | 21 | – | 12 | .636 |
| UC Davis | 14 | – | 6 | .700 | 20 | – | 13 | .606 |
| Hawai'i | 11 | – | 9 | .550 | 20 | – | 14 | .588 |
| Long Beach State † | 10 | – | 10 | .500 | 21 | – | 15 | .583 |
| UC Riverside | 10 | – | 10 | .500 | 16 | – | 18 | .471 |
| UC Santa Barbara | 9 | – | 11 | .450 | 16 | – | 15 | .516 |
| Cal State Northridge | 9 | – | 11 | .450 | 19 | – | 15 | .559 |
| Cal State Bakersfield | 8 | – | 12 | .400 | 13 | – | 19 | .406 |
| Cal State Fullerton | 7 | – | 13 | .350 | 14 | – | 18 | .438 |
| Cal Poly | 0 | – | 20 | .000 | 4 | – | 28 | .125 |
† 2024 Big West tournament winner * ineligible for the 2024 NCAA tournament due to transition period

The 2023–24 UC San Diego Tritons men's basketball team represented the University of California, San Diego during the 2023–24 NCAA Division I men's basketball season. The Tritons, led by eleventh-year head coach Eric Olen, played their home games at LionTree Arena in La Jolla, California, as members of the Big West Conference.

The Tritons were ineligible for postseason tournaments, including the NCAA tournament, as they are in the final year of the four-year mandatory transition period to Division I.

== Previous season ==
The Tritons finished the 2022–23 season 10–20, 5–13 in Big West play to finish in ninth place. Since they were in the third year of the a four-year mandatory transition period to Division I, they were ineligible to participate in the Big West tournament.

== Roster ==
2023–24 UC San Diego Tritons men's basketball team
Players
Coaches

| Pos. | # | Name | Height | Weight | Year | Previous school | Hometown |
|---|---|---|---|---|---|---|---|
| G | 0 | Camden McCormick | 6 ft 3 in (1.91 m) | 190 lb (86 kg) | So | Francis Parker School | San Diego, California |
| G | 2 | Michael Pearson Jr. | 5 ft 9 in (1.75 m) | 160 lb (73 kg) | RS So | Modesto Christian School | Tracy, California |
| F | 3 | Justin DeGraaf | 6 ft 7 in (2.01 m) | 210 lb (95 kg) | Jr | Bosco Institute | Hudsonville, Michigan |
| G | 4 | Bryce Pope | 6 ft 3 in (1.91 m) | 185 lb (84 kg) | RS Sr | Torrey Pines HS | San Diego, California |
| F | 5 | Cade Pendleton | 6 ft 10 in (2.08 m) | 210 lb (95 kg) | RS Fr | East Hamilton HS | Chattanooga, Tennessee |
| G | 10 | Hayden Gray | 6 ft 4 in (1.93 m) | 190 lb (86 kg) | Jr | Azusa Pacific | San Diego, California |
| G | 11 | Jasen Brooks | 6 ft 0 in (1.83 m) | 195 lb (88 kg) | Fr | Cleveland HS | Cleveland, Tennessee |
| G/F | 12 | Aniwaniwa Tait-Jones | 6 ft 6 in (1.98 m) | 200 lb (91 kg) | Jr | Hawaii–Hilo | Wellington, New Zealand |
| G/F | 13 | Tyler McGhie | 6 ft 5 in (1.96 m) | 195 lb (88 kg) | Jr | Southern Nazarene | Denton, Texas |
| F | 14 | Billy Haggerty | 6 ft 6 in (1.98 m) | 185 lb (84 kg) | Fr | De La Salle HS | Lafayette, California |
| G/F | 15 | Quin Patterson | 6 ft 7 in (2.01 m) | 205 lb (93 kg) | So | Mount Si HS | Snoqualmie, Washington |
| G | 20 | Aidan Burke | 6 ft 3 in (1.91 m) | 190 lb (86 kg) | Fr | Phillips Exeter Academy | Los Gatos, California |
| G | 22 | Yaqub Mir | 6 ft 2 in (1.88 m) | 175 lb (79 kg) | Fr | Granite Bay HS | Granite Bay, California |
| C | 25 | Emmanuel Tshimanga | 7 ft 0 in (2.13 m) | 270 lb (122 kg) | RS Sr | UC Irvine | Montreal, Quebec |
| F | 33 | J'Raan Brooks | 6 ft 9 in (2.06 m) | 215 lb (98 kg) | RS Sr | Washington | Seattle, Washington |
| F | 35 | Francis Nwaokorie | 6 ft 7 in (2.01 m) | 220 lb (100 kg) | Jr | Champlin Park HS | Brooklyn Park, Minnesota |

Head coach

- Eric Olen (Spring Hill)

Assistant coach(es)

- Clint Allard (UC San Diego)
- Tom Tankelewicz (Western Carolina)
- Steven Aldridge (San Diego City)
- Sam Stapleton (Occidental)
- Mikey Howell (UC San Diego)

Legend

- (C) Team captain
- (S) Suspended
- (I) Ineligible
- (W) Walk-on
- Injured
- Current redshirt

Roster
Last update: October 22, 2023

== Schedule and results ==
| Date time, TV | Rank^{#} | Opponent^{#} | Result | Record | Site (attendance) city, state |
Non-conference regular season
| November 6, 2023*; 7:30 pm, ESPN+ | | Denver | W 95–87 | 1–0 | LionTree Arena (1,437); La Jolla, CA |
| November 11, 2023*; 7:00 pm, ESPN+ | | San Diego | W 69–63 | 2–0 | LionTree Arena (2,038); La Jolla, CA |
| November 13, 2023*; 7:00 pm, ESPN+ | | La Verne | W 116–57 | 3–0 | LionTree Arena (871); La Jolla, CA |
| November 18, 2023*; 4:00 pm, ESPN+ | | Navy | W 73–55 | 4–0 | LionTree Arena (1,366); La Jolla, CA |
| November 24, 2023*; 3:00 pm, ESPN+ | | vs. Idaho | L 70–73 ^{OT} | 4–1 | Redhawk Center (592); Seattle, WA |
| November 26, 2023*; 3:00 pm, ESPN+ | | at Seattle | L 67–79 | 4–2 | Redhawk Center (836); Seattle, WA |
| November 28, 2023*; 7:00 pm, P12N | | at Washington | L 56–83 | 4–3 | Alaska Airlines Arena (5,726); Seattle, WA |
| December 1, 2023*; 7:00 pm, ESPN+ | | San Diego State | L 62–63 | 4–4 | LionTree Arena (4,000); La Jolla, CA |
| December 5, 2023*; 6:00 pm, ESPN+ | | Occidental | W 98–67 | 5–4 | LionTree Arena (716); La Jolla, CA |
| December 9, 2023*; 7:00 pm, ESPN+ | | at Pepperdine | L 62–68 | 5–5 | Firestone Fieldhouse (407); Malibu, CA |
| December 18, 2023*; 6:00 pm, ESPN+ | | at Sacramento State | W 83–52 | 6–5 | Hornets Nest (574); Sacramento, CA |
| December 20, 2023*; 2:00 pm, P12N | | at California | L 67–71 | 6–6 | Haas Pavilion (2,516); Berkeley, CA |
Big West regular season
| December 28, 2023; 7:00 pm, ESPN+ | | Cal State Bakersfield | W 76–64 | 7–6 (1–0) | LionTree Arena (1,019); La Jolla, CA |
| January 4, 2024; 7:00 pm, ESPN+ | | at UC Santa Barbara | W 79–72 | 8–6 (2–0) | The Thunderdome (1,914); Santa Barbara, CA |
| January 6, 2024; 4:00 pm, ESPN+ | | at Cal State Fullerton | W 76–58 | 9–6 (3–0) | Titan Gym (642); Fullerton, CA |
| January 11, 2024; 7:00 pm, ESPN+ | | Long Beach State | W 88–74 | 10–6 (4–0) | LionTree Arena (2,083); La Jolla, CA |
| January 13, 2024; 4:00 pm, ESPN+ | | at Cal Poly | W 86–61 | 11–6 (5–0) | Mott Athletics Center (2,757); San Luis Obispo, CA |
| January 18, 2024; 7:00 pm, ESPN+ | | at UC Irvine | L 65–76 | 11–7 (5–1) | Bren Events Center (3,108); Irvine, CA |
| January 20, 2024; 4:00 pm, ESPN+ | | Hawai'i | W 67–61 | 12–7 (6–1) | LionTree Arena (1,558); La Jolla, CA |
| January 25, 2024; 7:00 pm, ESPN+ | | UC Riverside | W 66–65 | 13–7 (7–1) | LionTree Arena (3,083); La Jolla, CA |
| January 27, 2024; 2:00 pm, ESPN+ | | at UC Davis | W 92–59 | 14–7 (8–1) | University Credit Union Center (2,537); Davis, CA |
| February 1, 2024; 7:00 pm, ESPN+ | | Cal State Northridge | W 83–62 | 15–7 (9–1) | LionTree Arena (1,277); La Jolla, CA |
| February 3, 2024; 4:00 pm, ESPN+ | | at Long Beach State | L 76–85 | 15–8 (9–2) | Walter Pyramid (2,308); Long Beach, CA |
| February 8, 2024; 9:00 pm, ESPN+ | | at Hawai'i | L 86–94 ^{OT} | 15–9 (9–3) | Stan Sheriff Center (4,249); Honolulu, HI |
| February 15, 2024; 7:00 pm, ESPN+ | | UC Santa Barbara | W 61–46 | 16–9 (10–3) | LionTree Arena (1,892); La Jolla, CA |
| February 17, 2024; 4:00 pm, ESPN+ | | Cal State Fullerton | W 76–69 | 17–9 (11–3) | LionTree Arena (1,134); La Jolla, CA |
| February 22, 2024; 7:00 pm, ESPN+ | | at UC Riverside | W 77–65 | 18–9 (12–3) | SRC Arena (703); Riverside, CA |
| February 24, 2024; 1:00 pm, Spectrum SportsNet/ESPN+ | | UC Irvine | W 92–88 ^{OT} | 19–9 (13–3) | LionTree Arena (1,864); La Jolla, CA |
| February 29, 2024; 7:00 pm, ESPN+ | | at Cal State Bakersfield | L 57–70 | 19–10 (13–4) | Icardo Center (1,349); Bakersfield, CA |
| March 2, 2024; 4:00 pm, ESPN+ | | at Cal State Northridge | W 79–69 | 20–10 (14–4) | Premier America Credit Union Arena (1,137); Northridge, CA |
| March 7, 2024; 7:00 pm, ESPN+ | | UC Davis | L 63–70 | 20–11 (14–5) | LionTree Arena (1,373); La Jolla, CA |
| March 9, 2024; 4:00 pm, ESPN+ | | Cal Poly | W 92–87 | 21–11 (15–5) | LionTree Arena (1,454); La Jolla, CA |
College Basketball Invitational
| March 23, 2024; 12:30 pm, FloHoops | (2) | vs. (15) Chicago State; First round | L 75–77 | 21–12 | Ocean Center; Daytona Beach, FL |
*Non-conference game. ^{#}Rankings from AP Poll. (#) Tournament seedings in parentheses. All times are in Pacific.
