= 2023–24 Cal State Bakersfield Roadrunners men's basketball team =

American college basketball season

2023–24 Cal State Bakersfield Roadrunners men's basketball
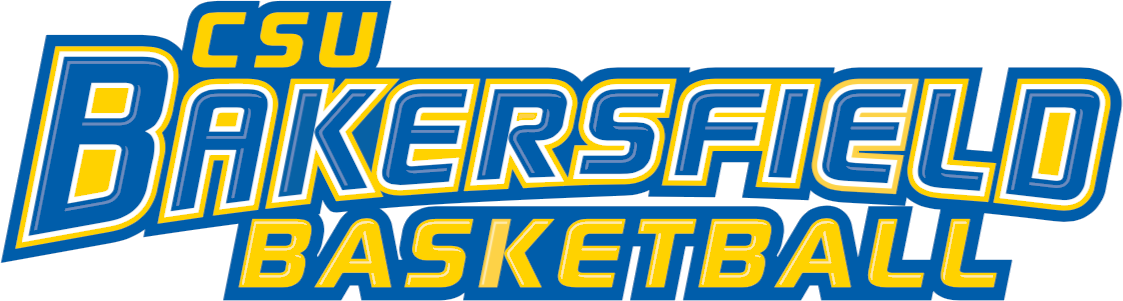
- Conference: Big West Conference
- Record: 13–19 (8–12 Big West)
- Head coach: Rod Barnes (13th season)
- Assistant coaches: Mike Scott (7th season); Brandon Barnes (5th season); Chris Crevelone (4th season)
- Home arena: Icardo Center

2023–24 Big West men's basketball standings
	Conf.				Overall
Team	W		L	PCT	W		L	PCT
UC Irvine	17	–	3	.850	24	–	10	.706
UC San Diego*	15	–	5	.750	21	–	12	.636
UC Davis	14	–	6	.700	20	–	13	.606
Hawai'i	11	–	9	.550	20	–	14	.588
Long Beach State †	10	–	10	.500	21	–	15	.583
UC Riverside	10	–	10	.500	16	–	18	.471
UC Santa Barbara	9	–	11	.450	16	–	15	.516
Cal State Northridge	9	–	11	.450	19	–	15	.559
Cal State Bakersfield	8	–	12	.400	13	–	19	.406
Cal State Fullerton	7	–	13	.350	14	–	18	.438
Cal Poly	0	–	20	.000	4	–	28	.125
† 2024 Big West tournament winner * ineligible for the 2024 NCAA tournament due to transition period

The 2023–24 Cal State Bakersfield Roadrunners men's basketball team represented California State University, Bakersfield in the 2023–24 NCAA Division I men's basketball season. They were led by thirteenth-year head coach Rod Barnes and played their games at the Icardo Center as members of the Big West Conference.

== Previous season ==
The Roadrunners finished the season 11–22, 6–14 in Big West play, to finish in eight place. In the Big West tournament, the team won their first-round game against Cal State Northridge before losing in the quarterfinals to UC Irvine to end their season.

== Roster ==
2023–24 Cal State Bakersfield Roadrunners men's basketball team
Players
Coaches

Pos.	#	Name	Height	Weight	Year	Hometown
G	1	Kaleb Higgins	5 ft 10 in (1.78 m)	160 lb (73 kg)	Sr	Pine Bluff, AR
F	2	Tom Mark	6 ft 7 in (2.01 m)	190 lb (86 kg)	Jr	Affligem, Belgium
G	3	Dalph Panopio	6 ft 1 in (1.85 m)	184 lb (83 kg)	Jr	Rome, Italy
G	5	Naseem Gaskin	6 ft 4 in (1.93 m)	185 lb (84 kg)	RS Jr	Oakland, CA
G	10	Marvin McGhee III	6 ft 4 in (1.93 m)	195 lb (88 kg)	Jr	Atlanta, GA
G	11	Kaseem Watson	6 ft 8 in (2.03 m)	190 lb (86 kg)	So	Philadelphia, PA
G	12	Kadar Waller	5 ft 11 in (1.8 m)	175 lb (79 kg)	Fr	Bakersfield, CA
G	13	Kareem Watson	6 ft 8 in (2.03 m)	190 lb (86 kg)	RS Fr	Philadelphia, PA
F	21	Ugnius Jarusevicius	6 ft 10 in (2.08 m)	220 lb (100 kg)	So	Alytus, Lithuania
G	22	Cameron Wilbon	6 ft 5 in (1.96 m)	200 lb (91 kg)	RS Sr	Gary, IN
F	23	Fidelis Okereke	6 ft 6 in (1.98 m)	260 lb (118 kg)	Jr	Carson, CA
G/F	24	Corey Stephenson	6 ft 6 in (1.98 m)	210 lb (95 kg)	So	Bessemer, AL
G/F	25	Jaden Alexander	6 ft 4 in (1.93 m)	200 lb (91 kg)	RS Fr	Fairfield, CA
G	55	Modestas Kancleris	6 ft 9 in (2.06 m)	205 lb (93 kg)	RS Jr	Kaunas, Lithuania

Head coach

- Rod Barnes (Mississippi)

Assistant coach(es)

- Mike Scott (Farleigh Dickinson)
- Brandon Barnes (Cal State Bakersfield)
- Chris Crevelone (Adams State)

Legend

- (C) Team captain
- (S) Suspended
- (I) Ineligible
- (W) Walk-on
- Injured
- Current redshirt

Roster
Last update: July 14, 2024

== Schedule and results ==
Date time, TV	Rank^{#}	Opponent^{#}	Result	Record	High points	High rebounds	High assists	Site (attendance) city, state
Regular season
November 6, 2023*; 7:00 p.m., ESPN+		Southern Utah	W 73–72	1–0	27 – Higgins	6 – tied	5 – Gaskin	Icardo Center (1,067); Bakersfield, CA
November 9, 2023*; 6:00 p.m., P12N		at No. 21 USC	L 59–85	1–1	19 – Higgins	8 – Kancleris	5 – Higgins	Galen Center (6,211); Los Angeles, CA
November 13, 2023*; 7:00 p.m., Pac-12 Network		at California; SoCal Challenge campus game	L 63–83	1–2	22 – Higgins	8 – Kancleris	2 – Higgins	Haas Pavilion (2,628); Berkeley, CA
November 16, 2023*; 11:00 a.m., ESPN+		Saint Katherine	W 77–44	2–2	13 – Higgins	8 – Jarusevicius	4 – Higgins	Icardo Center (3,336); Bakersfield, CA
November 20, 2023*; 12:00 p.m., FloHoops		vs. Sacramento State; SoCal Challenge Sand Division semifinal	W 75–71	3–2	13 – tied	7 – McGhee III	5 – Higgins	The Pavilion at JSerra (148); San Juan Capistrano, CA
November 22, 2023*; 2:00 p.m., FloHoops		vs. Tarleton State; SoCal Challenge Sand Division championship	L 40–59	3–3	14 – Jarusevicius	11 – Kancleris	2 – tied	The Pavilion at JSerra (259); San Juan Capistrano, CA
November 28, 2023*; 6:00 p.m., ESPN+		at No. 11 Gonzaga	L 65–81	3–4	21 – Higgins	7 – Kancleris	2 – Higgins	McCarthey Athletic Center (6,000); Spokane, WA
December 5, 2023*; 7:00 p.m., ESPN+		Whittier	W 106–58	4–4	22 – Higgins	6 – Kancleris	7 – Higgins	Icardo Center (930); Bakersfield, CA
December 9, 2023*; 11:00 a.m.		at South Dakota	L 73–78	4–5	16 – tied	7 – Okereke	6 – Higgins	Sanford Coyote Sports Center (1,652); Vermillion, SD
December 15, 2023*; 7:00 p.m., MW Network		at Fresno State	L 58–61	4–6	17 – Higgins	5 – tied	5 – Higgins	Save Mart Center (3,166); Fresno, CA
December 19, 2023*; 7:00 p.m., ESPN+		South Dakota	W 96–76	5–6	28 – Higgins	7 – Kancleris	5 – Higgins	Icardo Center (876); Bakersfield, CA
Big West regular season
December 28, 2023; 7:00 p.m., ESPN+		at UC San Diego	L 64–76	5–7 (0–1)	18 – McGhee III	7 – Kancleris	4 – Gaskin	LionTree Arena (1,019); La Jolla, CA
December 30, 2023; 7:00 p.m., ESPN+		UC Irvine	L 56–75	5–8 (0–2)	18 – Higgins	10 – Okereke	1 – tied	Icardo Center (1,081); Bakersfield, CA
January 4, 2024; 7:00 p.m., ESPN+		Hawaii	L 67–78	5–9 (0–3)	23 – Panopio	6 – Kancleris	2 – tied	Icardo Center (1,129); Bakersfield, CA
January 11, 2024; 7:00 p.m., ESPN+		at UC Santa Barbara	L 64–66 ^{OT}	5–10 (0–4)	12 – tied	10 – Mark	3 – Higgins	The Thunderdome (1,602); Santa Barbara, CA
January 13, 2024; 2:00 p.m., ESPN+		at UC Davis	L 71–78 ^{OT}	5–11 (0–5)	17 – Higgins	10 – Kancleris	3 – tied	University Credit Union Center (1,317); Davis, CA
January 18, 2024; 7:00 p.m., ESPN+		UC Riverside	W 80–56	6–11 (1–5)	21 – Stephenson	11 – Stephenson	6 – Higgins	Icardo Center (896); Bakersfield, CA
January 20, 2024; 7:00 p.m., ESPN+		Cal Poly	W 65–53	7–11 (2–5)	16 – Mark	13 – Kancleris	4 – Higgins	Icardo Center (1,974); Bakersfield, CA
January 25, 2024; 7:00 p.m., ESPN+		at Cal State Northridge	W 64–56	8–11 (3–5)	19 – Higgins	8 – Okereke	3 – Higgins	Premier America Credit Union Arena (1,110); Northridge, CA
January 27, 2024; 6:00 p.m., ESPN+		at Cal State Fullerton	L 50–68	8–12 (3–6)	11 – Higgins	8 – Okereke	2 – Higgins	Titan Gym (784); Fullerton, CA
February 1, 2024; 7:00 p.m., ESPN+		Long Beach State	W 82–76 ^{OT}	9–12 (4–6)	34 – Higgins	10 – McGhee III	8 – Higgins	Icardo Center (1,656); Bakersfield, CA
February 3, 2024; 7:00 p.m., ESPN+		UC Santa Barbara	L 59–70	9–13 (4–7)	19 – Higgins	9 – Kancleris	4 – Higgins	Icardo Center; Bakersfield, CA
February 8, 2024; 7:00 p.m., ESPN+		at UC Riverside	L 63–65	9–14 (4–8)	17 – Higgins	7 – Kancleris	5 – Higgins	SRC Arena (565); Riverside, CA
February 10, 2024; 1:00 p.m., Spectrum SportsNet		Cal State Fullerton	W 73–71	10–14 (5–8)	13 – tied	6 – Kancleris	4 – Gaskin	Icardo Center (874); Bakersfield, CA
February 15, 2024; 7:00 p.m., ESPN+		Cal State Northridge	L 71–76	10–15 (5–9)	17 – tied	8 – Stephenson	4 – Higgins	Icardo Center (984); Bakersfield, CA
February 17, 2024; 7:00 p.m.		at UC Irvine	L 71–77	10–16 (5–10)	15 – Higgins	5 – Higgins	5 – Higgins	Bren Events Center (2,129); Irvine, CA
February 22, 2024; 7:00 p.m., ESPN+		at Long Beach State	L 66–79	10–17 (5–11)	23 – Higgins	6 – tied	4 – Higgins	Walter Pyramid (1,732); Long Beach, CA
February 24, 2024; 7:00 p.m., ESPN+		UC Davis	W 75–56	11–17 (6–11)	16 – Kancleris	7 – Kancleris	4 – Higgins	Icardo Center (1,793); Bakersfield, CA
February 29, 2024; 7:00 p.m., ESPN+		UC San Diego	W 70–57	12–17 (7–11)	29 – Higgins	7 – tied	2 – tied	Icardo Center (1,349); Bakersfield, CA
March 2, 2024; 5:00 p.m.		at Cal Poly	W 68–56	13–17 (8–11)	21 – Higgins	9 – Kancleris	4 – Higgins	Mott Athletics Center (1,428); San Luis Obispo, CA
March 9, 2024; 9:00 p.m.		at Hawaii	L 57–74	13–18 (8–12)	15 – Higgins	8 – Kancleris	2 – Stephenson	Stan Sheriff Center (6,176); Honolulu, HI
Big West tournament
March 13, 2024; 6:00 p.m., ESPN+	(8)	vs. (5) UC Riverside; First round	L 78–83	13–19	35 – Higgins	9 – Kancleris	5 – Higgins	Dollar Loan Center; Henderson, NV
*Non-conference game. ^{#}Rankings from AP poll. (#) Tournament seedings in parentheses. All times are in Pacific.
