= 2023–24 Cal State Fullerton Titans men's basketball team =

American college basketball team season

2023–24 Cal State Fullerton Titans men's basketball
- Conference: Big West Conference
- Record: 14–18 (7–13 Big West)
- Head coach: Dedrique Taylor (11th season)
- Assistant coaches: Anthony Santos; Chris Walker; Ryan Hamm
- Home arena: Titan Gym (Capacity: 4,000)

2023–24 Big West men's basketball standings
	Conf.				Overall
Team	W		L	PCT	W		L	PCT
UC Irvine	17	–	3	.850	24	–	10	.706
UC San Diego*	15	–	5	.750	21	–	12	.636
UC Davis	14	–	6	.700	20	–	13	.606
Hawai'i	11	–	9	.550	20	–	14	.588
Long Beach State †	10	–	10	.500	21	–	15	.583
UC Riverside	10	–	10	.500	16	–	18	.471
UC Santa Barbara	9	–	11	.450	16	–	15	.516
Cal State Northridge	9	–	11	.450	19	–	15	.559
Cal State Bakersfield	8	–	12	.400	13	–	19	.406
Cal State Fullerton	7	–	13	.350	14	–	18	.438
Cal Poly	0	–	20	.000	4	–	28	.125
† 2024 Big West tournament winner * ineligible for the 2024 NCAA tournament due to transition period

The 2023–24 Cal State Fullerton Titans men's basketball team represented California State University, Fullerton in the 2023–24 NCAA Division I men's basketball season. The Titans, led by 11th-year head coach Dedrique Taylor, played their home games at Titan Gym in Fullerton, California as members of the Big West Conference.

== Previous season ==
The Titans finished the 2022–23 season 20–13, 12–6 in Big West play, to finish in fourth place. In the Big West tournament, they defeated Hawaii in the quarterfinals and upset top-seeded UC Irvine in the semifinals, before falling to UC Santa Barbara in the championship game.

== Roster ==
2023–24 Cal State Fullerton Titans men's basketball team
Players
Coaches

Pos.	#	Name	Height	Weight	Year	Previous school	Hometown
F	0	Jalen Cooper	6 ft 6 in (1.98 m)	200 lb (91 kg)	Jr	Palm Beach Atlantic	St. Petersburg, FL
G	1	Keith Richard	6 ft 1 in (1.85 m)	180 lb (82 kg)	Fr	South Oak Cliff HS	Dallas, TX
G	2	Max Jones	6 ft 4 in (1.93 m)	210 lb (95 kg)	Sr	Tampa	Clearwater, FL
F	3	Beril Kabamba	6 ft 5 in (1.96 m)	220 lb (100 kg)	Jr	Spring Hill	Clearwater, FL
G	5	Donovan Oday	6 ft 2 in (1.88 m)	185 lb (84 kg)	So	McNeese	Arlington, TX
G	7	DJ Brewton	6 ft 3 in (1.91 m)	200 lb (91 kg)	Sr	Alcorn State	Cincinnati, OH
G	10	Antwan Robinson	6 ft 4 in (1.93 m)	210 lb (95 kg)	Fr	East St. Louis HS	St. Louis, MO
G	11	Sydney Shipp	6 ft 0 in (1.83 m)	170 lb (77 kg)	Sr	Occidental	Chicago, IL
C	12	Zachary Visentin	6 ft 9 in (2.06 m)	280 lb (127 kg)	Jr	Snow CC	Spanish Fork, UT
F	13	Vincent Lee	6 ft 9 in (2.06 m)	235 lb (107 kg)	Sr	Nevada	Midlothian, TX
G	14	Trevor Williams	6 ft 1 in (1.85 m)	170 lb (77 kg)	Fr	Junípero Serra HS	Los Angeles, CA
G	21	Grayson Carper	6 ft 6 in (1.98 m)	195 lb (88 kg)	Sr	Columbia College	Fresno, CA
G	23	Tory San Antonio	6 ft 3 in (1.91 m)	175 lb (79 kg)	Sr	Rancho Verde HS	Moreno Valley, CA
F/C	24	Kendrick De Luna	6 ft 10 in (2.08 m)	230 lb (104 kg)	Fr	TMI Episcopal	San Antonio, TX
F	32	John Mikey Square	6 ft 6 in (1.98 m)	225 lb (102 kg)	Sr	Fairleigh Dickinson	Washington, D.C.

Head coach

- Dedrique Taylor (UC Davis)

Assistant coach(es)

- Anthony Santos (Cal State Fullerton)
- Chris Walker (Oklahoma)
- Ryan Hamm (Thomas More)

Legend

- (C) Team captain
- (S) Suspended
- (I) Ineligible
- (W) Walk-on
- Injured
- Current redshirt

Roster
Last update: September 6, 2024

== Schedule and results ==
Date time, TV	Rank^{#}	Opponent^{#}	Result	Record	High points	High rebounds	High assists	Site (attendance) city, state
Exhibition
October 28, 2023*; 12:00 p.m.		Life Pacific	W 96–64		26 – Jones	–	–	Titan Gym; Fullerton, CA
Non-conference regular season
November 6, 2023*; 7:30 p.m., FS1		at No. 17 San Diego State	L 57–83	0–1	13 – Brewton	9 – Carper	6 – Brewton	Viejas Arena (12,414); San Diego, CA
November 11, 2023*; 7:30 p.m., ESPN+		La Sierra	W 78–48	1–1	22 – Jones	8 – Carper	6 – Brewton	Titan Gym (776); Fullerton, CA
November 16, 2023*; 4:00 p.m., ESPN+		at UCF; Jacksonville Classic campus game	L 44–72	1–2	13 – Carper	6 – tied	4 – Brewton	Addition Financial Arena (5,322); Orlando, FL
November 19, 2023*; 11:30 a.m.		vs. Cornell; Jacksonville Classic Bay semifinals	L 70–88	1–3	23 – Jones	9 – Brewton	2 – tied	Flagler Gymnasium (311); St. Augustine, FL
November 20, 2023*; 8:30 a.m.		vs. Southern Miss; Jacksonville Classic Bay consolation	W 74–67	2–3	19 – Jones	7 – Carper	7 – Jones	Flagler Gymnasium (221); St. Augustine, FL
November 26, 2023*; 11:00 a.m.		at Nebraska	L 72–85	2–4	30 – Jones	7 – Carper	3 – Jones	Pinnacle Bank Arena (14,171); Lincoln, NE
December 1, 2023*; 6:00 p.m., ESPN+		North Dakota	W 64–54	3–4	19 – Brewton	8 – Lee	1 – tied	Titan Gym (908); Fullerton, CA
December 3, 2023*; 2:00 p.m., ESPN+		Stanton	W 102–52	4–4	16 – Jones	5 – tied	4 – Brewton	Titan Gym (692); Fullerton, CA
December 6, 2023*; 7:00 p.m., ESPN+		at Pepperdine	W 60–55	5–4	20 – Jones	6 – Square	3 – Jones	Firestone Fieldhouse; Malibu, CA
December 9, 2023*; 2:00 p.m., ESPN+		at Sacramento State	W 62–60	6–4	23 – Brewton	5 – tied	3 – Jones	Hornets Nest (765); Sacramento, CA
December 17, 2023*; 1:00 p.m.		at Boise State	L 65–88	6–5	19 – Jones	7 – Brewton	3 – Brewton	ExtraMile Arena (9,178); Boise, ID
December 20, 2023*; 7:00 p.m., ESPN+		Pacific	W 67–56	7–5	16 – Jones	8 – tied	3 – Jones	Titan Gym (518); Fullerton, CA
Big West regular season
December 28, 2023; 7:00 p.m., ESPN+		Long Beach State	L 71–81	7–6 (0–1)	19 – Jones	8 – Carper	4 – San Antonio	Titan Gym (1,436); Fullerton, CA
December 30, 2023; 9:00 p.m., ESPN+		at Hawaii	W 63–61 ^{OT}	8–6 (1–1)	17 – Brewton	6 – tied	2 – tied	Stan Sheriff Center (5,171); Honolulu, HI
January 4, 2024; 7:00 p.m.		at UC Irvine	L 67–75	8–7 (1–2)	19 – Brewton	8 – Brewton	3 – Brewton	Bren Events Center (1,934); Irvine, CA
January 6, 2024; 6:00 p.m., ESPN+		UC San Diego	L 58–76	8–8 (1–3)	18 – Brewton	4 – San Antonio	3 – Jones	Titan Gym (642); Fullerton, CA
January 13, 2024; 1:00 p.m., SpectrumSN/ESPN+		at CSUN	L 71–76	8–9 (1–4)	17 – Jones	5 – tied	4 – San Antonio	Premier America Credit Union Arena (384); Northridge, CA
January 18, 2024; 7:00 p.m., ESPN+		UC Davis	L 65–67	8–10 (1–5)	18 – Jones	7 – Kabamba	3 – Jones	Titan Gym (583); Fullerton, CA
January 20, 2024; 1:00 p.m., SpectrumSN/ESPN+		at UC Santa Barbara	W 73–69	9–10 (2–5)	22 – Jones	10 – Kabamba	5 – Jones	The Thunderdome (1,414); Santa Barbara, CA
January 25, 2024; 7:00 p.m., ESPN+		at Cal Poly	W 54–51	10–10 (3–5)	13 – Brewton	10 – Kabamba	3 – Kabamba	Mott Athletics Center (1,228); San Luis Obispo, CA
January 27, 2024; 6:00 p.m.		Cal State Bakersfield	W 68–50	11–10 (4–5)	17 – Brewton	9 – San Antonio	2 – tied	Titan Gym (784); Fullerton, CA
February 1, 2024; 7:00 p.m.		Hawai'i	L 68–76	11–11 (4–6)	19 – Brewton	6 – Square	4 – San Antonio	Titan Gym (1,339); Fullerton, CA
February 8, 2024; 6:00 p.m., ESPN+		at UC Davis	L 58–71	11–12 (4–7)	19 – Square	6 – Brewton	2 – San Antonio	University Credit Union Center (1,379); Davis, CA
February 10, 2024; 1:00 p.m., SpectrumSN/ESPN+		at CSU Bakersfield	L 71–73	11–13 (4–8)	21 – Jones	5 – Square	3 – San Antonio	Icardo Center (874); Bakersfield, CA
February 15, 2024; 7:00 p.m., ESPN+		UC Riverside	L 73–81	11–15 (4–9)	14 – San Antonio	10 – Carper	3 – tied	Titan Gym (633); Fullerton, CA
February 17, 2024; 4:00 p.m., ESPN+		at UC San Diego	L 69–76	11–15 (4–10)	30 – Brewton	8 – Brewton	6 – Brewton	LionTree Arena (1,134); La Jolla, CA
February 22, 2024; 7:00 p.m., ESPN+		Cal Poly	W 68–50	12–15 (5–10)	20 – tied	8 – Cooper	4 – Brewton	Titan Gym (525); Fullerton, CA
February 24, 2024; 6:00 p.m., ESPN+		CSUN	L 60–65	12–16 (5–11)	26 – Brewton	9 – Cooper	2 – tied	Titan Gym (680); Fullerton, CA
February 29, 2024; 7:00 p.m., ESPN+		at Long Beach State	W 76–71	13–16 (6–11)	26 – Brewton	5 – Brewton	6 – Brewton	Walter Pyramid (2,326); Long Beach, CA
March 2, 2024; 6:00 p.m., ESPN+		UC Santa Barbara	W 79–70	14–16 (7–11)	30 – Brewton	8 – San Antonio	2 – tied	Titan Gym (665); Fullerton, CA
March 7, 2024; 7:00 p.m., ESPN+		at UC Riverside	L 74–84	14–17 (7–12)	26 – Brewton	10 – Brewton	4 – San Antonio	SRC Arena (754); Riverside, CA
March 9, 2024; 6:00 p.m., ESPN+		UC Irvine	L 71–81	14–18 (7–13)	28 – Brewton	4 – San Antonio	2 – Brewton	Titan Gym (1,076); Fullerton, CA
*Non-conference game. ^{#}Rankings from AP poll. (#) Tournament seedings in parentheses. All times are in Pacific.
