= 2023–24 Long Beach State Beach men's basketball team =

Basketball team season

2023–24 Long Beach State Beach men's basketball

Big West Tournament champions

NCAA tournament, First Round
- Conference: Big West Conference
- Record: 21–15 (10–10 Big West)
- Head coach: Dan Monson (17th season)
- Associate head coach: Myke Scholl
- Assistant coaches: Senque Carey; Larry Anderson
- Home arena: Walter Pyramid

2023–24 Big West men's basketball standings
	Conf.				Overall
Team	W		L	PCT	W		L	PCT
UC Irvine	17	–	3	.850	24	–	10	.706
UC San Diego*	15	–	5	.750	21	–	12	.636
UC Davis	14	–	6	.700	20	–	13	.606
Hawai'i	11	–	9	.550	20	–	14	.588
Long Beach State †	10	–	10	.500	21	–	15	.583
UC Riverside	10	–	10	.500	16	–	18	.471
UC Santa Barbara	9	–	11	.450	16	–	15	.516
Cal State Northridge	9	–	11	.450	19	–	15	.559
Cal State Bakersfield	8	–	12	.400	13	–	19	.406
Cal State Fullerton	7	–	13	.350	14	–	18	.438
Cal Poly	0	–	20	.000	4	–	28	.125
† 2024 Big West tournament winner * ineligible for the 2024 NCAA tournament due to transition period

The 2023–24 Long Beach State Beach men's basketball team represented California State University, Long Beach during the 2023–24 NCAA Division I men's basketball season. The Beach, led by 17th-year head coach Dan Monson, played their home games at the Walter Pyramid in Long Beach, California as members of the Big West Conference. They finished the season 21–15, 10–10 in Big West play to finish a tie for fifth place. As the No. 4 seed in the Big West tournament, they defeated UC Riverside, UC Irvine, and UC Davis to win the tournament championship. As a result, they received the conference's automatic bid to the NCAA tournament as the No. 15 seed in the West region. There they lost to Arizona.

After the regular season, the school announced that head coach Dan Monson would finish the postseason as the team's head coach, but would not return as head coach by mutual agreement. Despite this, Monson led the team to the NCAA tournament. Athletic director Bobby Smitheran later stated he fired Monson to inspire the team.

== Previous season ==
The Beach finished the 2022–23 season 17–16, 11–9 in Big West play to finish in seventh place. In the Big West tournament, they were upset by Cal Poly in the first round.

== Roster ==
2023–24 Long Beach State Beach men's basketball team
Players
Coaches

Pos.	#	Name	Height	Weight	Year	Previous school	Hometown
G	0	Marcus Tsohonis	6 ft 3 in (1.91 m)	190 lb (86 kg)	Sr	VCU	Portland, OR
F	1	Amari Stroud	6 ft 10 in (2.08 m)	210 lb (95 kg)	Sr	Allan Hancock College	Fresno, CA
G	2	Isa Silva	6 ft 4 in (1.93 m)	190 lb (86 kg)	Jr	Stanford	Sacramento, CA
G	3	Maddox Monson	6 ft 2 in (1.88 m)	180 lb (82 kg)	So	Los Alamitos High School	Los Alamitos, CA
G	4	Messiah Thompson	5 ft 8 in (1.73 m)	170 lb (77 kg)	Sr	Alabama A&M	Atlanta, GA
G	5	Jason Hart Jr.	6 ft 2 in (1.88 m)	185 lb (84 kg)	RS Fr	St. Bernard High School	Los Angeles, CA
G	8	Eli Djordjevic	6 ft 8 in (2.03 m)	195 lb (88 kg)	Fr	Orangeville Prep	White Rock, BC
G	10	AJ George	6 ft 6 in (1.98 m)	190 lb (86 kg)	So	Hoover High School	Fresno, CA
G	11	Varick Lewis	6 ft 2 in (1.88 m)	175 lb (79 kg)	Fr	Monterey Trail High School	Elk Grove, CA
G	12	Jadon Jones	6 ft 5 in (1.96 m)	185 lb (84 kg)	Jr	St. Anthony High School	Long Beach, CA
C	13	Chayce Polynice	6 ft 11 in (2.11 m)	230 lb (104 kg)	Sr	College of Southern Idaho	Van Nuys, CA
F	23	Lassina Traoré	6 ft 10 in (2.08 m)	230 lb (104 kg)	Jr	Saint Louis	Abidjan, Côte d'Ivoire
F	25	Aboubacar Traoré	6 ft 5 in (1.96 m)	195 lb (88 kg)	Jr	LaBASE Academy	Abidjan, Côte d'Ivoire
F	35	Shaumba Ngoyi	6 ft 9 in (2.06 m)	200 lb (91 kg)	RS Fr	Sunrise Christian Academy	Kinshasa, DR Congo
C	40	Jeffrey Yan	6 ft 9 in (2.06 m)	260 lb (118 kg)	Sr	Capistrano Valley Christian School	Shanghai, China

Head coach

- Dan Monson (Idaho)

Assistant coach(es)

- Myke Scholl (Loyola Marymount)
- Senque Carey (New Mexico)
- Larry Anderson (Long Beach State)

Legend

- (C) Team captain
- (S) Suspended
- (I) Ineligible
- (W) Walk-on
- Injured
- Current redshirt

Roster
Last update: October 25, 2023

== Schedule and results ==
Date time, TV	Rank^{#}	Opponent^{#}	Result	Record	High points	High rebounds	High assists	Site (attendance) city, state
Exhibition
November 2, 2023*; 7:00 pm, −		Cal Lutheran	W 107–63		18 – L. Traoré	7 – L. Traoré	8 – Thompson	Walter Pyramid (1,603); Long Beach, CA
Non-conference regular season
November 6, 2023*; 7:30 pm, WCC Network		at Portland	L 73–78	0–1	23 – Jones	9 – A. Traoré	5 – A. Traoré	Chiles Center (1,073); Portland, OR
November 11, 2023*; 7:00 pm, FS2		at DePaul	W 77–73	1–1	22 – Tsohonis	11 – L. Traoré	4 – Silva	Wintrust Arena (2,651); Chicago, IL
November 14, 2023*; 7:00 pm, MW Network		at San Diego State	L 76–88	1–2	17 – Tsohonis	6 – A. Traoré	8 – A. Traoré	Viejas Arena (12,414); San Diego, CA
November 17, 2023*; 4:00 pm, B1G+		at Michigan	W 94–86	2–2	35 – Tsohonis	10 – L. Traoré	4 – Thompson	Crisler Center (10,866); Ann Arbor, MI
November 20, 2023*; 10:30 am, FloHoops		vs. Illinois State; Gulf Coast Showcase first round	L 52–61	2–3	10 – Thompson	15 – L. Traoré	4 – Thompson	Hertz Arena (214); Estero, FL
November 21, 2023*; 8:00 am, FloHoops		vs. Iona; Gulf Coast Showcase consolation 2nd round	W 80–76	3–3	19 – Jones	10 – A. Traoré	6 – A. Traoré	Hertz Arena (201); Estero, FL
November 22, 2023*; 10:30 am, FloHoops		vs. Louisiana; Gulf Coast Showcase 5th place game	L 82–92	3–4	18 – A. Traoré	10 – Ratliff	4 – A. Traoré	Hertz Arena (176); Estero, FL
November 26, 2023*; 1:00 pm, ESPN+		at Montana State	W 75–69	4–4	26 – Tsohonis	13 – L. Traoré	4 – Jones	Worthington Arena (2,501); Bozeman, MT
December 2, 2023*; 4:00 pm, ESPN+		Sacramento State	W 83–73	5–4	24 – Jones	11 – L. Traoré	6 – Tied	Walter Pyramid (1,815); Long Beach, CA
December 6, 2023*; 7:00 pm, ESPN+		Life Pacific	W 88–66	6–4	12 – V. Lewis	10 – A. Traoré	5 – Tied	Walter Pyramid (1,373); Long Beach, CA
December 10, 2023*; 1:00 pm, P12N		at USC	W 84–79 ^{OT}	7–4	28 – M. Tsohonis	8 – Tied	5 – A. Traoré	Galen Center (9,806); Los Angeles, CA
December 19, 2023*; 7:00 pm, ESPN+		Cal State Dominguez Hills	W 107–78	8–4	23 – Jones	10 – L. Traoré	5 – Silva	Walter Pyramid (1,602); Long Beach, CA
Big West regular season
December 28, 2023; 7:00 pm, ESPN+		at Cal State Fullerton	W 81–71	9–4 (1–0)	23 – A. Traoré	22 – A. Traoré	6 – A. Traoré	Titan Gym (1,436); Fullerton, CA
December 30, 2023; 4:00 pm, ESPN+		Cal State Northridge	L 68–84	9–5 (1–1)	17 – Tsohonis	7 – A. Traoré	5 – A. Traoré	Walter Pyramid (2,003); Long Beach, CA
January 4, 2024; 7:00 pm, ESPN+		at Cal Poly	W 89–82	10–5 (2–1)	30 – A. Traoré	19 – L. Traoré	6 – Thompson	Mott Athletics Center (1,482); San Luis Obispo, CA
January 6, 2024; 4:00 pm, ESPN+		UC Riverside	W 83–75	11–5 (3–1)	19 – L. Traoré	15 – L. Traoré	7 – Tsohonis	Walter Pyramid (2,546); Long Beach, CA
January 11, 2024; 7:00 pm, ESPN+		at UC San Diego	L 74–88	11–6 (3–2)	18 – Tsohonis	7 – A. Traoré	6 – Tsohonis	LionTree Arena (2,083); La Jolla, CA
January 13, 2024; 7:00 pm, ESPN+		at UC Santa Barbara	L 76–85	11–7 (3–3)	23 – Thompson	9 – A. Traoré	10 – A. Traoré	The Thunderdome (2,892); Santa Barbara, CA
January 18, 2024; 7:00 pm, ESPN+		Hawai'i	W 79–71	12–7 (4–3)	20 – Tsohonis	8 – A. Traoré	7 – A. Traoré	Walter Pyramid (1,835); Long Beach, CA
January 25, 2024; 7:00 pm, ESPN+		UC Irvine	L 61–72	12–8 (4–4)	15 – Tsohonis	8 – L. Traoré	3 – Tied	Walter Pyramid (3,024); Long Beach, CA
January 27, 2024; 1:00 pm, ESPN+		at UC Riverside	W 65–53	13–8 (5–4)	15 – Tsohonis	10 – A. Traoré	4 – Tied	SRC Arena (573); Riverside, CA
February 1, 2024; 7:00 pm, ESPN+		at Cal State Bakersfield	L 76–82 ^{OT}	13–9 (5–5)	28 – George	8 – L. Traoré	6 – A. Traoré	Icardo Center (1,656); Bakersfield, CA
February 3, 2024; 4:00 pm, ESPN+		UC San Diego	W 85–76	14–9 (6–5)	18 – Tsohonis	8 – L. Traoré	6 – Tsohonis	Walter Pyramid (2,308); Long Beach, CA
February 10, 2024; 4:00 pm, ESPN+		Cal Poly	W 77–68	15–9 (7–5)	26 – J. Jones	8 – Tied	6 – Tsohonis	Walter Pyramid (2,082); Long Beach, CA
February 15, 2024; 6:00 pm, ESPN+		at UC Davis	W 78–74	16–9 (8–5)	20 – A. Traoré	16 – L. Traoré	6 – L. Traoré	University Credit Union Center (1,810); Davis, CA
February 17, 2024; 5:00 pm, ESPN+		at Cal State Northridge	W 87–73	17–9 (9–5)	22 – Jones	15 – L. Traoré	7 – Tsohonis	Premier America Credit Union Arena (411); Northridge, CA
February 22, 2024; 7:00 pm, ESPN+		Cal State Bakersfield	W 79–66	18–9 (10–5)	18 – George	7 – George	5 – Jones	Walter Pyramid (1,732); Long Beach, CA
February 24, 2024; 9:00 pm, ESPN+		at Hawai'i	L 65–73	18–10 (10–6)	18 – George	14 – L. Traoré	2 – L. Traoré	Stan Sheriff Center (5,822); Honolulu, HI
February 29, 2024; 7:00 pm, ESPN+		Cal State Fullerton	L 71–76	18–11 (10–7)	23 – Jones	12 – L. Traoré	6 – A. Traoré	Walter Pyramid (2,326); Long Beach, CA
March 2, 2024; 7:00 pm, ESPN+		at UC Irvine	L 61–82	18–12 (10–8)	19 – Tsohonis	16 – L. Traoré	4 – A. Traoré	Bren Events Center (4,799); Irvine, CA
March 7, 2024; 7:00 pm, ESPN+		UC Santa Barbara	L 74–76	18–13 (10–9)	25 – Tsohonis	12 – L. Traoré	7 – A. Traoré	Walter Pyramid (2,255); Long Beach, CA
March 9, 2024; 3:00 pm, ESPN+		UC Davis	L 78–88	18–14 (10–10)	21 – Tsohonis	15 – L. Traoré	4 – Tsohonis	Walter Pyramid (1,894); Long Beach, CA
Big West tournament
March 14, 2024; 8:30 pm, ESPN+	(4)	vs. (5) UC Riverside; Quarterfinals	W 86–67	19–14	21 – Tied	11 – Tied	13 – A. Traoré	Dollar Loan Center (1,227); Henderson, NV
March 15, 2024; 6:00 pm, ESPN+	(4)	vs. (1) UC Irvine; Semifinals	W 83–79	20–14	20 – A. Traoré	10 – L. Traoré	7 – A. Traoré	Dollar Loan Center (−); Henderson, NV
March 16, 2024; 6:30 pm, ESPN2/ESPN+	(4)	vs. (2) UC Davis; Championship Game	W 74–70	21–14	25 – Tied	13 – A. Traoré	6 – A. Traoré	Dollar Loan Center (1,623); Henderson, NV
NCAA tournament
March 21, 2024; 11:00 am, TBS	(15 W)	vs. (2 W) No. 9 Arizona; First Round	L 65–85	21–15	14 – Tied	15 – A. Traoré	4 – A. Traoré	Delta Center (17,102); Salt Lake City, UT
*Non-conference game. ^{#}Rankings from AP Poll. (#) Tournament seedings in parentheses. All times are in Pacific.
