= 2023–24 Cal Poly Mustangs men's basketball team =

American college basketball season

2023–24 Cal Poly Mustangs men's basketball
- Conference: Big West Conference
- Record: 4–28 (0–20 Big West)
- Head coach: John Smith (5th season)
- Associate head coach: Omar Lowery
- Assistant coaches: Keith Berard; Jamal Smith
- Home arena: Mott Athletics Center (Capacity: 3,032)

2023–24 Big West men's basketball standings
	Conf.				Overall
Team	W		L	PCT	W		L	PCT
UC Irvine	17	–	3	.850	24	–	10	.706
UC San Diego*	15	–	5	.750	21	–	12	.636
UC Davis	14	–	6	.700	20	–	13	.606
Hawai'i	11	–	9	.550	20	–	14	.588
Long Beach State †	10	–	10	.500	21	–	15	.583
UC Riverside	10	–	10	.500	16	–	18	.471
UC Santa Barbara	9	–	11	.450	16	–	15	.516
Cal State Northridge	9	–	11	.450	19	–	15	.559
Cal State Bakersfield	8	–	12	.400	13	–	19	.406
Cal State Fullerton	7	–	13	.350	14	–	18	.438
Cal Poly	0	–	20	.000	4	–	28	.125
† 2024 Big West tournament winner * ineligible for the 2024 NCAA tournament due to transition period

The 2023–24 Cal Poly Mustangs men's basketball team represented California Polytechnic State University, San Luis Obispo in the 2023–24 NCAA Division I men's basketball season. They were led by fifth-year head coach John Smith and played their games at the Robert A. Mott Athletics Center in San Luis Obispo, California as members of the Big West Conference.

On March 1, 2024, the Mustangs announced they would part ways with John Smith following the season, after Cal Poly was eliminated from Big West tournament contention.

== Previous season ==
The Mustangs finished the season 8–25, 1–18 in Big West play, to finish in eleventh place. In the Big West tournament, the team won their first-round game against Long Beach State before losing in the quarterfinals to UC Santa Barbara to end their season.

== Roster ==
2023–24 Cal Poly Mustangs men's basketball team
Players
Coaches

Pos.	#	Name	Height	Weight	Year	Hometown
G	0	Jarred Hyder	6 ft 3 in (1.91 m)	185 lb (84 kg)	GS	San Bernardino, CA
G	1	Quentin Jones	6 ft 5 in (1.96 m)	170 lb (77 kg)	Fr	Hazel Crest, IL
G	2	Justin Page	6 ft 5 in (1.96 m)	185 lb (84 kg)	Fr	East Peoria, IL
G	3	Kobe Sanders	6 ft 8 in (2.03 m)	205 lb (93 kg)	Sr	San Diego, CA
F	5	Julien Franklin	6 ft 7 in (2.01 m)	210 lb (95 kg)	Jr	Brea, CA
G	10	Isaac Spears	6 ft 4 in (1.93 m)	170 lb (77 kg)	RS So	Las Vegas, NV
G	11	Hayden Jory	6 ft 0 in (1.83 m)	180 lb (82 kg)	Jr	Lompoc, CA
F	12	Cam Malray	6 ft 8 in (2.03 m)	220 lb (100 kg)	Jr	Kansas City, MO
F	13	Paul Bizimana	6 ft 9 in (2.06 m)	215 lb (98 kg)	Jr	Haltom City, TX
G	14	Aidan Prukop	6 ft 4 in (1.93 m)	180 lb (82 kg)	Jr	Ladera Ranch, CA
F	15	Aaron Jr. Price	6 ft 8 in (2.03 m)	225 lb (102 kg)	So	Las Vegas, NV
F	20	Cole Haller	6 ft 7 in (2.01 m)	205 lb (93 kg)	So	Bellevue, WA
C	21	Joel Armotrading	6 ft 10 in (2.08 m)	225 lb (102 kg)	Jr	London, England
G	24	Logan McLaughlin	6 ft 2 in (1.88 m)	185 lb (84 kg)	Jr	Carrollton, TX
G	25	Jackson Mosley	5 ft 10 in (1.78 m)	170 lb (77 kg)	Fr	La Cañada, CA
F	33	Tuukka Jaakkola	6 ft 10 in (2.08 m)	240 lb (109 kg)	GS	Helsinki, Finland

Head coach

- John Smith (Dominican)

Assistant coach(es)

- Omar Lowery (Concordia)
- Keith Berard (Southern Utah)
- Jamal Smith (Cal State Fullerton)

Legend

- (C) Team captain
- (S) Suspended
- (I) Ineligible
- (W) Walk-on
- Injured
- Current redshirt

Roster
Last update: July 29, 2025

== Schedule and results ==
Date time, TV	Rank^{#}	Opponent^{#}	Result	Record	High points	High rebounds	High assists	Site (attendance) city, state
Exhibition
November 2, 2023*; 7:00 p.m.		Cal State Los Angeles	L 44–59		10 – Page	6 – 3 tied	2 – Hyder	Mott Athletics Center (-); San Luis Obispo, CA
Regular season
November 6, 2023*; 7:00 p.m., ESPN+		La Verne	W 80–62	1–0	21 – Armotrading	8 – Armotrading	4 – Jones	Mott Athletics Center (1,126); San Luis Obispo, CA
November 9, 2023*; 6:00 p.m.		at Denver	L 76–97	1–1	18 – Sanders	7 – Price Jr.	5 – Hyder	Magness Arena (818); Denver, CO
November 11, 2023*; 6:00 p.m.		at Wyoming	L 66–80	1–2	25 – Hyder	5 – Hyder	1 – 3 tied	Arena-Auditorium (3,826); Laramie, WY
November 17, 2023*; 4:30 p.m.		vs. St. Thomas (MN); The Lancer Joust	W 61–60	2–2	17 – Jones	6 – 2 tied	2 – 2 tied	Fowler Events Center (141); Riverside, CA
November 18, 2023*; 2:30 p.m.		vs. Portland State; The Lancer Joust	L 57–73	2–3	20 – Sanders	7 – Armotrading	5 – Hyder	Fowler Events Center (197); Riverside, CA
November 19, 2023*; 5:00 p.m., ESPN+		at California Baptist; The Lancer Joust	L 58–67	2–4	17 – Sanders	7 – 2 tied	3 – 2 tied	Fowler Events Center (2,009); Riverside, CA
November 29, 2023*; 7:00 p.m., ESPN+		San Jose State	W 81–77 ^{OT}	3–4	22 – Sanders	8 – Bizimana	4 – 2 tied	Mott Athletics Center (1,352); San Luis Obispo, CA
December 2, 2023*; 7:00 p.m.		at Idaho	L 70–85	3–5	20 – Sanders	8 – Armotrading	3 – 2 tied	Idaho Central Credit Union Arena (1,898); Moscow, ID
December 4, 2023*; 7:00 p.m.		at Oregon State	L 63–70 ^{2OT}	3–6	21 – Jones	9 – Armotrading	2 – 2 tied	Gill Coliseum (2,568); Corvallis, OR
December 9, 2023*; 6:00 p.m.		at Weber State	L 50–78	3–7	16 – Sanders	7 – Jones	2 – 2 tied	Dee Events Center (3,636); Ogden, UT
December 18, 2023*; 7:00 p.m., ESPN+		Eastern Washington	L 53–62	3–8	17 – Sanders	9 – Jaakkola	2 – Jones	Mott Athletics Center (1,387); San Luis Obispo, CA
December 21, 2023*; 7:00 p.m., ESPN+		Omaha	W 66–53	4–8	30 – Sanders	9 – Jaakkola	4 – Hyder	Mott Athletics Center (1,381); San Luis Obispo, CA
Big West regular season
December 28, 2023; 7:00 p.m., ESPN+		Cal State Northridge	L 73–83	4–9 (0–1)	33 – Sanders	5 – Armotrading	5 – Sanders	Mott Athletics Center (1,428); San Luis Obispo, CA
December 30, 2023; 2:00 p.m., ESPN+		at UC Davis	L 46–71	4–10 (0–2)	13 – Hyder	4 – 2 tied	1 – 5 tied	University Credit Union Center (1,186); Davis, CA
January 4, 2024; 7:00 p.m., ESPN+		Long Beach State	L 82–89	4–11 (0–3)	22 – Jones	7 – Bizimana	9 – Sanders	Mott Athletics Center (1,482); San Luis Obispo, CA
January 6, 2024; 7:00 p.m., ESPN+		UC Santa Barbara	L 52–61	4–12 (0–4)	22 – Sanders	5 – 3 tied	9 – Sanders	Mott Athletics Center (2,687); San Luis Obispo, CA
January 11, 2024; 7:00 p.m., ESPN+		at UC Riverside	L 56–71	4–13 (0–5)	15 – Jaakkola	6 – Jones	4 – Jory	SRC Arena (512); Riverside, CA
January 13, 2024; 7:00 p.m., ESPN+		UC San Diego	L 61–86	4–14 (0–6)	12 – 2 tied	5 – Jory	3 – Jones	Mott Athletics Center (2,757); San Luis Obispo, CA
January 20, 2024; 7:00 p.m., ESPN+		at Cal State Bakersfield	L 53–65	4–15 (0–7)	16 – Jones	6 – Bizimana	2 – 2 tied	Icardo Center (1,974); Bakersfield, CA
January 25, 2024; 7:00 p.m., ESPN+		Cal State Fullerton	L 51–54	4–16 (0–8)	14 – Sanders	8 – Jaakkola	7 – Sanders	Mott Athletics Center (1,228); San Luis Obispo, CA
January 27, 2024; 5:00 p.m., ESPN+		at Hawaii	L 73–83	4–17 (0–9)	32 – Sanders	10 – Sanders	4 – 2 tied	Stan Sheriff Center (4,921); Honolulu, HI
February 1, 2024; 7:00 p.m., ESPN+		UC Irvine	L 59–73	4–18 (0–10)	23 – Sanders	8 – Bizimana	4 – Sanders	Mott Athletic Center (1,097); San Luis Obispo, CA
February 3, 2024; 3:00 p.m., ESPN+		UC Davis	L 52–59	4–19 (0–11)	14 – Sanders	13 – Armotrading	4 – Sanders	Mott Athletic Center (2,087); San Luis Obispo, CA
February 8, 2024; 7:00 p.m., ESPN+		at Cal State Northridge	L 65–78	4–20 (0–12)	12 – Jaakkola	6 – Jaakkola	8 – Sanders	Premier America Credit Union Arena (390); Northridge, CA
February 10, 2024; 4:00 p.m., ESPN+		at Long Beach State	L 68–77	4–21 (0–13)	21 – Hyder	6 – 2 tied	6 – Sanders	Walter Pyramid (2,082); Long Beach, CA
February 15, 2024; 7:00 p.m., ESPN+		Hawaii	L 51–80	4–22 (0–14)	11 – Jones	10 – Jones	2 – Jaakkola	Mott Athletic Center (1,122); San Luis Obispo, CA
February 22, 2024; 7:00 p.m., ESPN+		at Cal State Fullerton	L 50–68	4–23 (0–15)	14 – Jones	8 – Jaakkola	3 – Hyder	Titan Gym (525); Fullerton, CA
February 24, 2024; 7:00 p.m., ESPN+		UC Riverside	L 78–84	4–24 (0–16)	35 – Sanders	3 – 5 tied	3 – Sanders	Mott Athletics Center (1,428); San Luis Obispo, CA
February 29, 2024; 7:00 p.m., ESPN+		at UC Santa Barbara	L 75–83	4–25 (0–17)	31 – Sanders	7 – Hyder	3 – 3 tied	The Thunderdome (4,000); Santa Barbara, CA
March 2, 2024; 7:00 p.m., ESPN+		Cal State Bakersfield	L 56–68	4–26 (0–18)	24 – Sanders	6 – Sanders	1 – 6 tied	Mott Athletics Center (1,428); San Luis Obispo, CA
March 7, 2024; 7:00 p.m., ESPN+		at UC Irvine	L 68–82	4–27 (0–19)	22 – Sanders	9 – Jones	3 – Hyder	Bren Events Center (2,785); Irvine, CA
March 9, 2024; 4:00 p.m., ESPN+		at UC San Diego	L 87–92	4–28 (0–20)	30 – Sanders	8 – Armotrading	8 – Sanders	LionTree Arena (1,454); La Jolla, CA
*Non-conference game. ^{#}Rankings from AP poll. (#) Tournament seedings in parentheses. All times are in Pacific.
