= 2024 Big West Conference men's basketball tournament =

- Classification: Division I
- Season: 2023–24
- Teams: 8
- Site: Dollar Loan Center; Henderson, Nevada
- Champions: Long Beach State (6th title)
- Winning coach: Dan Monson (2nd title)
- MVP: Aboubacar Traore (Long Beach State)
- Attendance: 5,486 (total); 1,623 (championship)
- Television: ESPN+ ESPNU; ESPN2

2023–24 Big West men's basketball standings
	Conf.				Overall
Team	W		L	PCT	W		L	PCT
UC Irvine	17	–	3	.850	24	–	10	.706
UC San Diego*	15	–	5	.750	21	–	12	.636
UC Davis	14	–	6	.700	20	–	13	.606
Hawai'i	11	–	9	.550	20	–	14	.588
Long Beach State †	10	–	10	.500	21	–	15	.583
UC Riverside	10	–	10	.500	16	–	18	.471
UC Santa Barbara	9	–	11	.450	16	–	15	.516
Cal State Northridge	9	–	11	.450	19	–	15	.559
Cal State Bakersfield	8	–	12	.400	13	–	19	.406
Cal State Fullerton	7	–	13	.350	14	–	18	.438
Cal Poly	0	–	20	.000	4	–	28	.125
† 2024 Big West tournament winner * ineligible for the 2024 NCAA tournament due to transition period

The 2024 Big West Conference men's basketball tournament was the postseason men's basketball tournament for the Big West Conference of the 2023–24 NCAA Division I men's basketball season. It was held March 13–16, 2024, at The Dollar Loan Center in Henderson, Nevada. The winner, #4 seed Long Beach State, received the conference's automatic bid to the 2024 NCAA tournament.

== Seeds ==
In June 2023, the Big West Conference board of directors voted to reduce the tournament field from 10 teams to 8 teams. In the new format, the top two seeds would receive automatic berths in the semifinals, the next two seeds would be placed in the quarterfinals, and the remaining four seeds would play each other in the first round. Big West commissioner Dan Butterly stated that the decision was made to improve the regular season champion's odds of winning the tournament and thus receiving the automatic bid to the NCAA tournament.

Of the 11 conference teams, 10 were eligible for tournament spots. UC San Diego was ineligible for the tournament, as it was in the final year of the four-year transition required for teams transferring to Division I from Division II. Teams were seeded based on their performance within the conference, and teams with identical conference records were seeded using a tiebreaker system.

As was the case with tournaments since 2020, reseeding of teams did not occur at any point.

Seed	School	Record	Tiebreaker
1	UC Irvine	17–3	
2	UC Davis	14–6	
3	Hawai'i	11–9	
4	Long Beach State	10–10	2–0 vs. UC Riverside
5	UC Riverside	10–10	0–2 vs. Long Beach State
6	UC Santa Barbara	9–11	2–0 vs. Hawai'i
7	Cal State Northridge	9–11	1–1 vs. Hawai'i
8	Cal State Bakersfield	8–12	
DNQ	Cal State Fullerton	7–13	
DNQ	Cal Poly	0–20	

== Schedule and results ==
Game	Time	Matchup	Score	Television	Attendance
First round – Wednesday, March 13
1	6:00pm	No. 5 UC Riverside vs. No. 8 Cal State Bakersfield	83–78	ESPN+	717
2	8:30pm	No. 6 UC Santa Barbara vs. No. 7 Cal State Northridge	84–87^{OT}	ESPN+	717
Quarterfinals – Thursday, March 14
3	6:00pm	No. 3 Hawai'i vs. No. 7 Cal State Northridge	75–68	ESPN+	1,227
4	8:30pm	No. 4 Long Beach State vs. No. 5 UC Riverside	86–67	ESPN+	1,227
Semifinals – Friday, March 15
5	6:00pm	No. 1 UC Irvine vs. No. 4 Long Beach State	79–83	ESPN+ (live), ESPNU (delayed)	1,919
6	8:30pm	No. 2 UC Davis vs. No. 3 Hawai'i	68–65	ESPN2/ESPN+	1,919
Final – Saturday, March 16
7	6:30pm	No. 4 Long Beach State vs. No. 2 UC Davis	74-70	ESPN2/ESPN+	1,623
*Game times in PDT. Rankings denote tournament seed.

== Bracket ==
First Round; Wednesday, March 13
5	UC Riverside	83
8	Cal State Bakersfield	78
6	UC Santa Barbara	84
7	Cal State Northridge	87*

Quarterfinals; Thursday, March 14
4	Long Beach State	86
5	UC Riverside	67
3	Hawai'i	75
7	Cal State Northridge	68

Semifinals; Friday, March 15
1	UC Irvine	79
4	Long Beach State	83
2	UC Davis	68
3	Hawai'i	65

Championship; Saturday, March 16
4	Long Beach State	74
2	UC Davis	70

*denotes each overtime period
