= 2023–24 UC Davis Aggies men's basketball team =

American college basketball season

2023–24 UC Davis Aggies men's basketball
- Conference: Big West Conference
- Record: 20–13 (14–6 Big West)
- Head coach: Jim Les (13th season)
- Associate head coach: Kevin Nosek
- Assistant coaches: Kyle Vogt; Jonathan Metzger-Jones
- Home arena: University Credit Union Center

2023–24 Big West men's basketball standings
	Conf.				Overall
Team	W		L	PCT	W		L	PCT
UC Irvine	17	–	3	.850	24	–	10	.706
UC San Diego*	15	–	5	.750	21	–	12	.636
UC Davis	14	–	6	.700	20	–	13	.606
Hawai'i	11	–	9	.550	20	–	14	.588
Long Beach State †	10	–	10	.500	21	–	15	.583
UC Riverside	10	–	10	.500	16	–	18	.471
UC Santa Barbara	9	–	11	.450	16	–	15	.516
Cal State Northridge	9	–	11	.450	19	–	15	.559
Cal State Bakersfield	8	–	12	.400	13	–	19	.406
Cal State Fullerton	7	–	13	.350	14	–	18	.438
Cal Poly	0	–	20	.000	4	–	28	.125
† 2024 Big West tournament winner * ineligible for the 2024 NCAA tournament due to transition period

The 2023–24 UC Davis Aggies men's basketball team represented the University of California, Davis in the 2022–23 NCAA Division I men's basketball season. The Aggies, led by 13th-year head coach Jim Les, played their home games at the University Credit Union Center in Davis, California as members of the Big West Conference. They finished the season 20–13, 14–6 in Big West play, to finish in third place. Due to UC San Diego's transition to Division I, the Aggies were the No. 2 seed in the Big West tournament, where they defeated Hawaii in the semifinals before losing to Long Beach State in the championship game.

== Previous season ==
The Aggies finished the 2022–23 season 18–14, 11–8 in Big West play, to finish in sixth place. They were defeated by UC Riverside in the first round of the Big West tournament.

Elijah Pepper scored 697 points to break the program's single-season scoring record, which had been held by Randy DeBortoli since 1987–88. He also became the 10th UC Davis player to score 1,000 career points since the school transitioned to the NCAA Division I level.

== Offseason ==
=== Departures ===
Departures
Name	Number	Pos.	Height	Weight	Year	Hometown	Reason for departure
Joaquin Strong	1	F	6' 7"	215	Freshman	Playa del Rey, CA	No longer on team roster
Christian Anigwe	4	F	6' 9"	220	Senior	Phoenix, AZ	Graduated
Robby Beasley III	5	G	6' 3"	190	Sophomore	San Ramon, CA	Transferred to San Francisco
DeAndre Henry	15	F	6' 7"	225	Junior	Phoenix, AZ	Entered NCAA transfer portal

=== Incoming transfers ===
Incoming transfers
Name	Number	Pos.	Height	Weight	Year	Hometown	Previous school
Marsalis Roberson	5	G	6' 6"	200	Junior	Oakland, CA	California
Pablo Tamba	8	F	6' 7"	210	Junior	Málaga, Spain	Indian River State
Drew Carter	15	G	6' 3"	195	Sophomore	Portland, OR	Colorado
Lukas Prongos	32	F	6' 6"	235	Junior	San Rafael, CA	College of Marin

=== 2023 recruiting class ===
College recruiting information
Name	Hometown	School	Height	Weight	Commit date
Connor Sevilla; PG	San Ramon, CA	Dougherty Valley High School	6 ft 0 in (1.83 m)	N/A	
Connor Sevilla; PG	Recruit ratings: Rivals: 247Sports: ESPN:				
Overall recruit ranking:
Note: In many cases, Scout, Rivals, 247Sports, On3, and ESPN may conflict in their listings of height and weight.; In these cases, the average was taken. ESPN grades are on a 100-point scale.; Sources: "2023 Team Ranking". Rivals.

== Preseason ==
=== Big West coaches poll ===
The Big West Conference coaches poll was released on October 19, 2023. UC Davis was picked to finish fifth in the Big West Conference with 69 points.

Coaches poll
Predicted finish	Team	Votes (1st place)
1	UC Santa Barbara	92 (9)
2	Long Beach State	82 (2)
3	Hawaii	80
4	UC Irvine	75
5	UC Davis	69
6	Cal State Fullerton	58
7	UC Riverside	45
8	Cal State Bakersfield	36
9	UC San Diego	31
10	Cal State Northridge	18
11	Cal Poly	12

=== Preseason All-Big West teams ===
Elijah Pepper was selected to the All-Big West Preseason Team.

== Roster ==
2023–24 UC Davis Aggies men's basketball team
Players
Coaches

Pos.	#	Name	Height	Weight	Year	Previous school	Hometown
G	0	Kane Milling	6 ft 4 in (1.93 m)	180 lb (82 kg)	Sr	Nevada	Nantes, France
G	2	Ty Johnson	6 ft 3 in (1.91 m)	190 lb (86 kg)	Jr	Loyola–Chicago	Chicago, Illinois
G	4	Connor Sevilla	6 ft 0 in (1.83 m)	—	Fr	Dougherty Valley High School	San Ramon, CA
G	5	Marsalis Roberson	6 ft 6 in (1.98 m)	—	Jr	California	Oakland, CA
F	8	Pablo Tamba	6 ft 7 in (2.01 m)	210 lb (95 kg)	Jr	Indian River State	Málaga, Spain
G	10	Leo DeBruhl	6 ft 2 in (1.88 m)	190 lb (86 kg)	Jr	Seattle Academy	Seattle, WA
F	11	Jac Mani	6 ft 9 in (2.06 m)	217 lb (98 kg)	RS Fr	Beverly Hills High School	Beverly Hills, CA
F	13	Sam Manu	6 ft 7 in (2.01 m)	210 lb (95 kg)	Sr	College of San Mateo	Taipei, Taiwan
G	15	Drew Carter	6 ft 3 in (1.91 m)	200 lb (91 kg)	So	Colorado	Portland, OR
F	20	Niko Rocak	6 ft 9 in (2.06 m)	220 lb (100 kg)	Jr	UC Santa Barbara	Geneva, Switzerland
G	22	Sione Losé	6 ft 4 in (1.93 m)	170 lb (77 kg)	RS So	Capital Christian High School	Sacramento, CA
G	24	Ade Adebayo	6 ft 5 in (1.96 m)	205 lb (93 kg)	Sr	Barking Abbey School	London, England
F	32	Lukas Prongos	6 ft 6 in (1.98 m)	235 lb (107 kg)	Jr	College of Marin	San Rafael, CA
G	40	Elijah Pepper	6 ft 4 in (1.93 m)	200 lb (91 kg)	Sr	Selah High School	Selah, WA
F	55	Francesco Borra	6 ft 11 in (2.11 m)	255 lb (116 kg)	Jr	JSerra Catholic High School	Moncalieri, Italy

Head coach

- Jim Les (Bradley)

Assistant coach(es)

- Kevin Nosek (UC Davis)
- Kyle Vogt (Lakeland)
- Jonathan Metzger-Jones (Pacific)

Legend

- (C) Team captain
- (S) Suspended
- (I) Ineligible
- (W) Walk-on
- Injured
- Current redshirt

Roster

== Schedule and results ==
Date time, TV	Rank^{#}	Opponent^{#}	Result	Record	High points	High rebounds	High assists	Site (attendance) city, state
Non-conference regular season
November 6, 2023*; 6:00 p.m., ESPN+		Jessup	W 86–51	1–0	21 – Pepper	7 – 2 tied	7 – DeBruhl	University Credit Union Center (567); Davis, CA
November 9, 2023*; 2:30 p.m., ESPN+		Pepperdine	W 79–78	2–0	28 – Johnson	6 – 2 tied	4 – Adebayo	University Credit Union Center (1,263); Davis, CA
November 12, 2023*; 7:00 p.m., ESPN+		at Montana; Montana MTE	L 65–78	2–1	23 – Pepper	6 – 3 tied	3 – DeBruhl	Dahlberg Arena (2,507); Missoula, MT
November 14, 2023*; 2:00 p.m., ESPN+		vs. North Dakota State; Montana MTE	W 68–53	3–1	24 – Pepper	7 – Pepper	3 – Johnson	Dahlberg Arena (71); Missoula, MT
November 26, 2023*; 5:00 p.m., ESPN+		Sacramento State; Causeway Cup	L 63–69	3–2	22 – Pepper	6 – 2 tied	4 – Johnson	University Credit Union Center (1,485); Davis, CA
November 30, 2023*; 7:00 p.m.		at Oregon State	L 59–71	3–3	11 – Milling	4 – Borra	4 – Adebayo	Gill Coliseum (2,757); Corvallis, OR
December 6, 2023*; 6:00 p.m.		at Nevada	L 68–80	3–4	20 – Pepper	6 – 2 tied	4 – Johnson	Lawlor Events Center (7,312); Reno, NV
December 9, 2023*; 2:00 p.m., ESPN+		Milwaukee	L 79–81	3–5	28 – 2 tied	6 – Pepper	4 – 2 tied	University Credit Union Center (1,143); Davis, CA
December 16, 2023*; 2:00 p.m.		at Pacific	W 82–61	4–5	30 – Johnson	8 – Milling	4 – Pepper	Alex G. Spanos Center (932); Stockton, CA
December 19, 2023*; 6:00 p.m., ESPN+		Montana	L 61–73	4–6	16 – Milling	8 – Rocak	4 – Johnson	University Credit Union Center (941); Davis, CA
December 21, 2023*; 6:00 p.m., ESPN+		UC Merced	W 80–57	5–6	21 – Pepper	7 – Rocak	4 – 2 tied	University Credit Union Center (1,219); Davis, CA
Big West regular season
December 28, 2023; 6:00 p.m., ESPNU		UC Santa Barbara	W 76–62	6–6 (1–0)	27 – Pepper	6 – Rocak	10 – Johnson	University Credit Union Center (1,771); Davis, CA
December 30, 2023; 2:00 p.m., ESPN+		Cal Poly	W 71–46	7–6 (2–0)	25 – Pepper	6 – 2 tied	4 – Johnson	University Credit Union Center (1,186); Davis, CA
January 4, 2024; 7:00 p.m., ESPN+		at UC Riverside	W 83–63	8–6 (3–0)	31 – Pepper	8 – Pepper	4 – 2 tied	SRC Arena (257); Riverside, CA
January 6, 2024; 1:00 p.m., ESPN+		at UC Irvine	L 71–74 ^{OT}	8–7 (3–1)	26 – Pepper	5 – Rocak	5 – Johnson	Bren Events Center (2,232); Irvine, CA
January 11, 2024; 6:00 p.m., ESPN+		Cal State Northridge	W 95–75	9–7 (4–1)	27 – Milling	6 – DeBruhl	7 – Pepper	University Credit Union Center (1,262); Davis, CA
January 13, 2024; 2:00 p.m., ESPN+		Cal State Bakersfield	W 78–71 ^{OT}	10–7 (5–1)	22 – Johnson	9 – Pepper	5 – Johnson	University Credit Union Center (1,317); Davis, CA
January 18, 2024; 7:00 p.m., ESPN+		at Cal State Fullerton	W 67–65	11–7 (6–1)	27 – Pepper	10 – Pepper	3 – Johnson	Titan Gym (583); Fullerton, CA
January 20, 2024; 2:00 p.m., ESPN+		UC Irvine	W 54–52	12–7 (7–1)	19 – Johnson	9 – Milling	5 – Johnson	University Credit Union Center (2,153); Davis, CA
January 27, 2024; 2:00 p.m., ESPN+		UC San Diego	L 59–92	12–8 (7–2)	22 – Johnson	6 – Rocak	2 – 2 tied	University Credit Union Center (2,537); Davis, CA
February 1, 2024; 7:00 p.m., ESPN+		UC Santa Barbara	W 79–69	13–8 (8–2)	24 – 2 tied	9 – Rocak	6 – Pepper	The Thunderdome (2,204); Santa Barbara, CA
February 3, 2024; 3:00 p.m., ESPN+		at Cal Poly	W 59–52	14–8 (9–2)	16 – Pepper	9 – Rocak	4 – DeBruhl	Mott Athletics Center (2,087); San Luis Obispo, CA
February 8, 2024; 6:00 p.m., ESPN+		Cal State Fullerton	W 71–58	15–8 (10–2)	19 – Pepper	5 – 3 tied	4 – Pepper	University Credit Union Center (1,379); Davis, CA
February 10, 2024; 7:00 p.m., ESPN+		at Hawaii	L 70–87	15–9 (10–3)	27 – Pepper	7 – Rocak	2 – Johnson	Stan Sheriff Center (5,576); Honolulu, HI
February 15, 2024; 6:00 p.m., ESPN+		Long Beach State	L 74–78	15–10 (10–4)	32 – Pepper	8 – Rocak	4 – Adebayo	University Credit Union Center (1,810); Davis, CA
February 17, 2024; 2:00 p.m., ESPN+		UC Riverside	L 61–67	15–11 (10–5)	22 – Johnson	7 – Rocak	5 – Johnson	University Credit Union Center (2,031); Davis, CA
February 22, 2024; 7:00 p.m., ESPN+		at Cal State Northridge	W 66–65	16–11 (11–5)	24 – Johnson	6 – Milling	5 – Johnson	Premier America Credit Union Arena (542); Northridge, CA
February 24, 2024; 7:00 p.m., ESPN+		at Cal State Bakersfield	L 56–75	16–12 (11–6)	22 – Johnson	5 – Johnson	2 – Johnson	Icardo Center (1,793); Bakersfield, CA
February 29, 2024; 6:00 p.m., ESPN+		Hawaii	W 75–63	17–12 (12–6)	30 – 2 tied	4 – 3 tied	3 – Milling	University Credit Union Center (2,398); Davis, CA
March 7, 2024; 7:00 p.m., ESPN+		at UC San Diego	W 70–63	18–12 (13–6)	28 – Pepper	10 – Tamba	5 – Pepper	LionTree Arena (1,373); La Jolla, CA
March 9, 2024; 3:00 p.m., ESPN+		at Long Beach State	W 88–78	19–12 (14–6)	24 – Milling	5 – Milling	4 – Pepper	Walter Pyramid (1,894); Long Beach, CA
Big West tournament
March 15, 2024; 8:30 p.m., ESPNU	(2)	vs. (3) Hawaii; Semifinals	W 68–65	20–12	25 – Pepper	7 – Milling	5 – Johnson	Dollar Loan Center (1,919); Henderson, NV
March 16, 2024; 6:30 p.m., ESPN2/ESPN+	(2)	vs. (4) Long Beach State; Championship	L 70–74	20–13	30 – Johnson	9 – Pepper	4 – Johnson	Dollar Loan Center (1,623); Henderson, NV
*Non-conference game. ^{#}Rankings from AP poll. (#) Tournament seedings in parentheses. All times are in Pacific.
