= The King's Academy (Seymour, Tennessee) =

The King’s Academy
- Seymour, Tennessee; United States

Information
- Type: Private, Christian, College-preparatory
- Motto: Faith, Vision, Character, Community, Excellence
- Established: 1880
- Grades: Pre-K3– 12 (day), 7–12 (boarding)
- Enrollment: ~410 (2025)
- Campus size: 65 acres
- Mascot: Lions
- Tuition: $10,940 (day), $37,500 (boarding)
- Website: thekingsacademy.net

The King’s Academy is a private, Christian, college preparatory school located in Seymour, Tennessee, United States. It serves students from pre-school through grade 12, offering both day and boarding programs. The school emphasizes academic excellence within a Christ-centered environment and maintains a global student body.

== History ==
The school was founded in 1880 as the Harrison-Chilhowee Baptist Academy. Over time it developed into The King’s Academy, serving both domestic and international students. The campus covers approximately 65 acres in the foothills of the Great Smoky Mountains.

== Mission and vision ==
The mission of The King’s Academy is to inspire and equip students of diverse cultural backgrounds to achieve their God-given potential. It provides a nurturing, college-preparatory environment focused on developing servant leaders who will impact the world for Christ.

The vision emphasizes Christ-like character, academic rigor, service, and community within a framework of biblical faith.

== Academics ==
The school maintains a smaller than average class size, with average class sizes of about 15 students. The curriculum is college preparatory, and the school reports a 99% college acceptance rate.

Enrollment is approximately 410 students as of 2025. Day students are accepted from pre-school through grade 12, while boarding students are enrolled in grades 7–12.

== International student body ==
The King’s Academy hosts students from more than 23 countries, creating a culturally diverse environment that influences both academics and residence life.

== Tuition ==
As of 2025, tuition costs are:

- Day students: $10,940 per year
- Boarding students: $37,500 per year

== Campus life ==
The school provides opportunities for spiritual, academic, athletic, and artistic growth. Its core values are listed as Faith, Vision, Character, Community, and Excellence.

== See also ==
- List of Baptist schools in the United States
