= 2024–25 UC Davis Aggies men's basketball team =

American college basketball season

2024–25 UC Davis Aggies men's basketball
- Conference: Big West Conference
- Record: 15–17 (9–11 Big West)
- Head coach: Jim Les (14th season)
- Associate head coach: Kevin Nosek
- Assistant coaches: Kyle Vogt; Jonathan Metzger-Jones
- Home arena: University Credit Union Center

2024–25 Big West men's basketball standings
	Conf.				Overall
Team	W		L	PCT	W		L	PCT
UC San Diego †	18	–	2	.900	30	–	5	.857
UC Irvine	17	–	3	.850	32	–	7	.821
UC Riverside	14	–	6	.700	21	–	13	.618
Cal State Northridge	14	–	6	.700	22	–	11	.667
UC Santa Barbara	11	–	9	.550	21	–	13	.618
UC Davis	9	–	11	.450	15	–	17	.469
Cal Poly	8	–	12	.400	16	–	19	.457
Cal State Bakersfield	8	–	12	.400	14	–	19	.424
Hawai'i	7	–	13	.350	15	–	16	.484
Long Beach State	3	–	17	.150	7	–	25	.219
Cal State Fullerton	1	–	19	.050	6	–	26	.188
† 2025 Big West tournament winner

The 2024–25 UC Davis Aggies men's basketball team represented the University of California, Davis in the 2024–25 NCAA Division I men's basketball season. The Aggies, led by 14th-year head coach Jim Les, played their home games at the University Credit Union Center in Davis, California, as members of the Big West Conference.

== Previous season ==
The Aggies finished the 2023–24 season 20–13, 14–6 in Big West play, to finish in third place. In the Big West tournament, they defeated Hawaii in the semifinals before losing to Long Beach State in the championship game.

== Offseason ==
=== Departures ===
Departures
Name	Number	Pos.	Height	Weight	Year	Hometown	Reason for departure
Kane Milling	0	G	6'4"	202	Senior	Nantes, France	Graduated
Sam Manu	13	F	6'7"	210	Senior	Taipei, Taiwan	Graduated/signed to play professionally in Taiwan with the Taipei Taishin Mars
Drew Carter	15	G	6'3"	200	Sophomore	Portland, OR	Transferred to Oregon

=== Incoming transfers ===
Incoming transfers
Name	Number	Pos.	Height	Weight	Year	Hometown	Previous school
Carl Daughtery Jr.	1	G	6'3"	200	Junior	Maumelle, AR	Central Arkansas
Derek Sangster	6	F/G	6'7"	210	Sophomore	Sunnyvale, CA	Princeton
Nils Cooper	36	G	6'6"	185	Sophomore	Los Angeles, CA	Pepperdine
Jamaal Unuakhalu	44	F	6'7"	215	Junior	Los Angeles, CA	Moorpark College

=== 2024 recruiting class ===
College recruiting information
Name	Hometown	School	Height	Weight	Commit date
Isaiah Chappell; F	Los Angeles, CA	Crossroads School	6 ft 9 in (2.06 m)	225 lb (102 kg)	Oct 23, 2023
Isaiah Chappell; F	Recruit ratings: Rivals: 247Sports: ESPN:				
Jacob Gilchrist; G	Lincoln, CA	Twelve Bridges High School	6 ft 7 in (2.01 m)	185 lb (84 kg)	
Jacob Gilchrist; G	Recruit ratings: Rivals: 247Sports: ESPN:				
Overall recruit ranking:
Note: In many cases, Scout, Rivals, 247Sports, On3, and ESPN may conflict in their listings of height and weight.; In these cases, the average was taken. ESPN grades are on a 100-point scale.; Sources: "2024 Team Ranking". Rivals.

== Roster ==
2024–25 UC Davis Aggies men's basketball team
Players
Coaches

Pos.	#	Name	Height	Weight	Year	Previous school	Hometown
G	1	Carl Daughtery Jr.	6 ft 3 in (1.91 m)	200 lb (91 kg)	Jr	Central Arkansas	Maumelle, AR
G	2	Ty Johnson	6 ft 3 in (1.91 m)	190 lb (86 kg)	Sr	Loyola–Chicago	Chicago, Illinois
G	4	Connor Sevilla	6 ft 0 in (1.83 m)	175 lb (79 kg)	So	Dougherty Valley High School	San Ramon, CA
G	5	Marsalis Roberson	6 ft 6 in (1.98 m)	210 lb (95 kg)	RS Jr	California	Oakland, CA
G/F	6	Derek Sangster	6 ft 7 in (2.01 m)	200 lb (91 kg)	So	Princeton	Sunnyvale, CA
F	7	Niko Rocak	6 ft 9 in (2.06 m)	220 lb (100 kg)	Sr	UC Santa Barbara	Geneva, Switzerland
F	8	Pablo Tamba	6 ft 7 in (2.01 m)	210 lb (95 kg)	Sr	Indian River State	Málaga, Spain
G	10	Leo DeBruhl	6 ft 3 in (1.91 m)	190 lb (86 kg)	Sr	Seattle Academy	Seattle, WA
F	11	Jac Mani	6 ft 9 in (2.06 m)	217 lb (98 kg)	RS So	Beverly Hills High School	Beverly Hills, CA
F	20	Isaiah Chappell	6 ft 9 in (2.06 m)	225 lb (102 kg)	Fr	Crossroads School	Los Angeles, CA
G	22	Sione Losé	6 ft 4 in (1.93 m)	170 lb (77 kg)	RS Jr	Capital Christian High School	Sacramento, CA
F	25	Lukas Prongos	6 ft 6 in (1.98 m)	235 lb (107 kg)	Sr	College of Marin	San Rafael, CA
G	34	Jacob Gilchrist	6 ft 7 in (2.01 m)	185 lb (84 kg)	Fr	Twelve Bridges High School	Lincoln, CA
G	36	Nils Cooper	6 ft 6 in (1.98 m)	185 lb (84 kg)	So	Pepperdine	Los Angeles, CA
F	44	Jamaal Unuakhalu	6 ft 7 in (2.01 m)	215 lb (98 kg)	Jr	Moorpark College	Los Angeles, CA
F	55	Francesco Borra	7 ft 0 in (2.13 m)	265 lb (120 kg)	Sr	JSerra Catholic High School	Moncalieri, Italy

Head coach

- Jim Les (Bradley)

Assistant coach(es)

- Kevin Nosek (UC Davis)
- Kyle Vogt (Lakeland)
- Jonathan Metzger-Jones (Pacific)

Legend

- (C) Team captain
- (S) Suspended
- (I) Ineligible
- (W) Walk-on
- Injured
- Current redshirt

Roster

== Schedule and results ==
Date time, TV	Rank^{#}	Opponent^{#}	Result	Record	High points	High rebounds	High assists	Site (attendance) city, state
Regular season
November 5, 2024*; 7:00 p.m., BTN		at Washington	L 73–79	0–1	35 – Johnson	11 – Rocak	2 – DeBruhl	Alaska Airlines Arena (5,355); Seattle, WA
November 7, 2024*; 7:30 p.m., ESPN+		at Idaho	W 79–75	1–1	30 – Johnson	9 – Rocak	2 – Tied	ICCU Arena (1,736); Moscow, ID
November 12, 2024*; 6:00 p.m., ESPN+		Menlo	W 80–70	2–1	22 – Johnson	9 – Rocak	5 – Johnson	University Credit Union Center (1,027); Davis, CA
November 17, 2024*; 1:00 p.m., ACCNX		at Stanford; Acrisure Series Showcase on-campus game	L 65–79	2–2	26 – Johnson	7 – Rocak	6 – DeBruhl	Maples Pavilion (2,791); Stanford, CA
November 20, 2024*; 6:00 p.m., ESPN+		at Grand Canyon; Acrisure Series Showcase on-campus game	W 75–68	3–2	21 – Johnson	13 – Rocak	3 – Tied	Global Credit Union Arena (7,002); Phoenix, AZ
November 25, 2024*; 6:00 p.m., ESPN+		Norfolk State; Acrisure Series Showcase on-campus game	L 55–76	3–3	15 – Sevilla	6 – Tamba	3 – Tamba	University Credit Union Center (1,113); Davis, CA
November 30, 2024*; 7:00 p.m., ESPN+		at Oregon State	L 57–90	3–4	14 – Sevilla	3 – Unuakhalu	4 – Losé	Gill Coliseum (2,517); Corvallis, OR
December 5, 2024; 6:00 p.m., ESPN+		Cal Poly	W 77–66	4–4 (1–0)	17 – Sevilla	6 – Tamba	4 – Tied	University Credit Union Center (1,274); Davis, CA
December 7, 2024; 2:00 p.m., ESPN+		UC Santa Barbara	W 71–60	5–4 (2–0)	23 – Johnson	10 – Rocak	4 – Tied	University Credit Union Center (2,891); Davis, CA
December 14, 2024*; 7:00 p.m., ESPN+		at Sacramento State; Causeway Cup	W 69–62	6–4	18 – Tamba	9 – Rocak	3 – DeBruhl	Hornets Nest (902); Sacramento, CA
December 18, 2024*; 6:00 p.m., ESPN+		Idaho	W 74–66	7–4	19 – Johnson	11 – Rocak	6 – DeBruhl	University Credit Union Center (875); Davis, CA
December 21, 2024*; 12:00 p.m., ESPN+		at Pepperdine	L 46–85	7–5	11 – Daughtery Jr.	6 – DeBruhl	2 – DeBruhl	Firestone Fieldhouse (503); Malibu, CA
December 28, 2024*; 4:00 p.m., ESPN+		Cal Maritime	W 109–46	8–5	21 – Johnson	10 – Johnson	5 – Losé	University Credit Union Center (907); Davis, CA
January 2, 2025; 6:30 p.m., ESPN+		at Cal State Bakersfield	L 64–75	8–6 (2–1)	26 – Johnson	11 – Rocak	2 – Tied	Icardo Center (705); Bakersfield, CA
January 4, 2025; 3:00 p.m., ESPN+		at Cal State Northridge	L 61–73	8–7 (2–2)	17 – Johnson	8 – Rocak	3 – DeBruhl	Premier America Credit Union Arena (411); Northridge, CA
January 9, 2025; 6:00 p.m., ESPN+		Cal State Fullerton	W 63–53	9–7 (3–2)	18 – Sevilla	11 – Tamba	3 – DeBruhl	University Credit Union Center (1,372); Davis, CA
January 11, 2025; 2:00 p.m., ESPN+		Long Beach State	L 73–84	9–8 (3–3)	31 – Johnson	9 – Rocak	4 – Johnson	University Credit Union Center (2,263); Davis, CA
January 16, 2025; 7:00 p.m., ESPN+		at Cal Poly	W 65–54	10–8 (4–3)	21 – Johnson	7 – Tamba	3 – Tamba	Mott Athletics Center (1,439); San Luis Obispo, CA
January 18, 2025; 1:00 p.m., ESPN+		at UC Santa Barbara	W 64–60	11–8 (5–3)	35 – Johnson	10 – Rocak	4 – DeBruhl	The Thunderdome (1,081); Santa Barbara, CA
January 23, 2025; 6:00 p.m., ESPN+		Hawaii	W 68–66	12–8 (6–3)	23 – Johnson	9 – Rocak	4 – Johnson	University Credit Union Center (1,478); Davis, CA
January 30, 2025; 7:00 p.m., ESPN+		at UC Riverside	L 58–60	12–9 (6–4)	20 – Johnson	10 – Rocak	4 – Rocak	SRC Arena (1,754); Riverside, CA
February 1, 2025; 1:00 p.m., ESPN+		at UC Irvine	L 66–73	12–10 (6–5)	21 – Johnson	9 – Rocak	5 – Johnson	Bren Events Center (2,325); Irvine, CA
February 6, 2025; 7:00 p.m., ESPN+		at Long Beach State	W 73–65 ^{OT}	13–10 (7–5)	33 – Johnson	7 – Rocak	4 – Tied	Walter Pyramid (1,904); Long Beach, CA
February 8, 2025; 6:00 p.m., ESPN+		at Cal State Fullerton	W 65–49	14–10 (8–5)	20 – Johnson	6 – DeBruhl	10 – DeBruhl	Titan Gym (452); Fullerton, CA
February 13, 2025; 6:00 p.m., ESPN+		UC Riverside	W 75–74	15–10 (9–5)	23 – Johnson	13 – DeBruhl	4 – Johnson	University Credit Union Center (1,221); Davis, CA
February 15, 2025; 4:00 p.m., ESPN+		at UC San Diego	L 60–85	15–11 (9–6)	14 – Johnson	8 – Cooper	5 – DeBruhl	LionTree Arena (2,003); La Jolla, CA
February 20, 2025; 6:00 p.m., ESPN+		Cal State Bakersfield	L 66–71	15–12 (9–7)	21 – Johnson	8 – Tamba	4 – Johnson	University Credit Union Center (1,213); Davis, CA
February 22, 2025; 2:00 p.m., ESPN+		Cal State Northridge	L 62–65	15–13 (9–8)	24 – Johnson	5 – Rocak	7 – Johnson	University Credit Union Center (1,572); Davis, CA
March 1, 2025; 9:00 p.m., ESPN+		at Hawaii	L 70–78	15–14 (9–9)	26 – Johnson	9 – Tamba	2 – Tied	Stan Sheriff Center (5,088); Honolulu, HI
March 6, 2025; 6:00 p.m., ESPN+		UC Irvine	L 59–88	15–15 (9–10)	24 – Johnson	4 – Tied	2 – Johnson	University Credit Union Center (2,472); Davis, CA
March 8, 2025; 8:00 p.m., ESPN2		UC San Diego	L 57–68	15–16 (9–11)	19 – DeBruhl	13 – Cooper	6 – DeBruhl	University Credit Union Center (4,281); Davis, CA
Big West tournament
March 12, 2025; 8:30 p.m., ESPN+	(6)	vs. (7) Cal Poly; First round	L 76–86	15–17	25 – Tamba	4 – Tied	11 – Johnson	Lee's Family Forum; Henderson, NV
*Non-conference game. ^{#}Rankings from AP poll. (#) Tournament seedings in parentheses. All times are in Pacific.
