= 2024–25 Cal State Bakersfield Roadrunners men's basketball team =

American college basketball season

2024–25 Cal State Bakersfield Roadrunners men's basketball
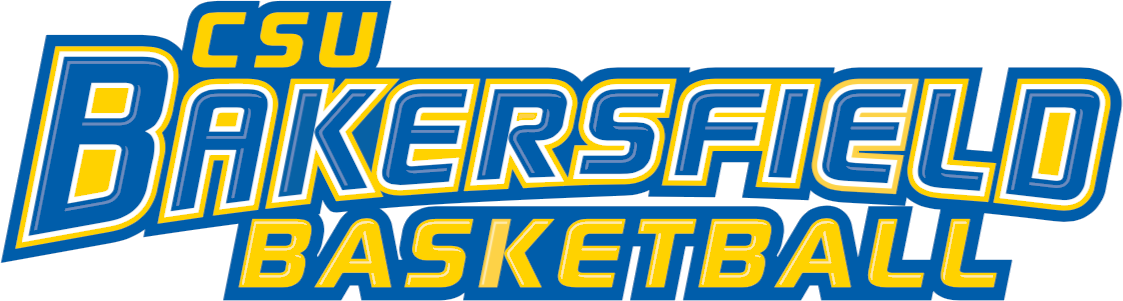
- Conference: Big West Conference
- Record: 14–19 (8–12 Big West)
- Head coach: Rod Barnes (14th season)
- Assistant coaches: Mike Scott (8th season); Brandon Barnes (6th season); Brent Wrapp (1st season)
- Home arena: Icardo Center

2024–25 Big West men's basketball standings
	Conf.				Overall
Team	W		L	PCT	W		L	PCT
UC San Diego †	18	–	2	.900	30	–	5	.857
UC Irvine	17	–	3	.850	32	–	7	.821
UC Riverside	14	–	6	.700	21	–	13	.618
Cal State Northridge	14	–	6	.700	22	–	11	.667
UC Santa Barbara	11	–	9	.550	21	–	13	.618
UC Davis	9	–	11	.450	15	–	17	.469
Cal Poly	8	–	12	.400	16	–	19	.457
Cal State Bakersfield	8	–	12	.400	14	–	19	.424
Hawai'i	7	–	13	.350	15	–	16	.484
Long Beach State	3	–	17	.150	7	–	25	.219
Cal State Fullerton	1	–	19	.050	6	–	26	.188
† 2025 Big West tournament winner

The 2024–25 Cal State Bakersfield Roadrunners men's basketball team represented California State University, Bakersfield during the 2024–25 NCAA Division I men's basketball season. The Roadrunners, led by 14th-year head coach Rod Barnes, played their home games at the Icardo Center located in Bakersfield, California as members of the Big West Conference.

== Previous season ==
The Roadrunners finished the 2023–24 season 13–19, 8–12 in Big West play to finish in ninth place. They were defeated by UC Riverside in the first round of the Big West tournament.

== Roster ==
2024–25 Cal State Bakersfield Roadrunners men's basketball team
Players
Coaches

Pos.	#	Name	Height	Weight	Year	Previous school	Hometown
G	0	CJ Hardy	6 ft 3 in (1.91 m)	170 lb (77 kg)	Jr	West Los Angeles College	Gardena, California
F	1	Tom Mark	6 ft 7 in (2.01 m)	190 lb (86 kg)	Sr	Tallahassee CC	Affligem, Belgium
G	2	Mike Price	6 ft 3 in (1.91 m)	170 lb (77 kg)	Fr	Southern California Academy	Chicago, Illinois
G/F	3	Corey Stephenson	6 ft 6 in (1.98 m)	220 lb (100 kg)	Jr	Northeast Mississippi CC	Bessemer, Alabama
G	4	Marvin McGhee IV	6 ft 6 in (1.98 m)	198 lb (90 kg)	So	Bishop State CC	Atlanta, Georgia
G	5	Bentley Waller	6 ft 4 in (1.93 m)	—	Fr	Bakersfield Christian HS	Bakersfield, California
G	10	Marvin McGhee III	6 ft 4 in (1.93 m)	195 lb (88 kg)	Sr	South Georgia Tech	Atlanta, Georgia
F	11	Colin Darby	6 ft 7 in (2.01 m)	—	Fr	Dynamic Prep	Frisco, Texas
G	12	Kadar Waller	5 ft 11 in (1.8 m)	185 lb (84 kg)	RS Sr	Mississippi Valley State	Bakersfield, California
G	21	Jemel Jones	6 ft 4 in (1.93 m)	—	Jr	South Suburban College	Chicago, Illinois
F/C	22	Cameron Clark	6 ft 10 in (2.08 m)	214 lb (97 kg)	Jr	College of the Sequoias	Gwinnett, Georgia
F	23	Fidelis Okereke	6 ft 6 in (1.98 m)	260 lb (118 kg)	Sr	Cal State Northridge	Carson, California
F	24	Gloire Goma	6 ft 5 in (1.96 m)	194 lb (88 kg)	So	Clarendon College	Republic of the Congo
G/F	25	Jaden Alexander	6 ft 5 in (1.96 m)	205 lb (93 kg)	RS So	New Mexico State	Fairfield, California
C	34	Shakir Odunewu	6 ft 11 in (2.11 m)	265 lb (120 kg)	RS So	West Valley College	Cairo, Egypt

Head coach

- Rod Barnes (Mississippi)

Assistant coach(es)

- Mike Scott (Fairleigh Dickinson)
- Brandon Barnes (Cal State Bakersfield)
- Brent Wrapp (Cal State Bakersfield)

Legend

- (C) Team captain
- (S) Suspended
- (I) Ineligible
- (W) Walk-on
- Injured
- Current redshirt

Roster
Last update: October 27, 2024

== Schedule and results ==
Date time, TV	Rank^{#}	Opponent^{#}	Result	Record	High points	High rebounds	High assists	Site (attendance) city, state
Regular season
November 4, 2024*; 8:30 pm, ACCNX/ESPN+		at California	L 73–86	0–1	22 – Jones	10 – Odunewu	4 – Jones	Haas Pavilion (3,472); Berkeley, CA
November 7, 2024*; 11:00 am, ESPN+		Bethesda	W 122–53	1–1	19 – Jones	8 – Tied	7 – K. Waller	Icardo Center (3,071); Bakersfield, CA
November 11, 2024*; 6:30 pm, ESPN+		North Dakota State	W 86–81	2–1	25 – Jones	9 – Okereke	2 – Tied	Icardo Center (720); Bakersfield, CA
November 16, 2024*; 6:30 pm, ESPN+		Fresno State	W 74–56	3–1	17 – Stephenson	12 – McGhee IV	5 – Hardy	Icardo Center (2,057); Bakersfield, CA
November 22, 2024*; 8:00 am, ESPN+		at Florida Gulf Coast; Homewood Suites Classic	L 54–74	3–2	15 – McGhee III	4 – Alexander	2 – Hardy	Alico Arena (1,388); Fort Myers, FL
November 23, 2024*; 8:00 am		vs. FIU; Homewood Suites Classic	L 73–76 ^{OT}	3–3	18 – Jones	6 – Tied	3 – Tied	Alico Arena (742); Fort Myers, FL
November 24, 2024*; 9:00 am		vs. Northeastern; Homewood Suites Classic	W 68–60	4–3	21 – Stephenson	8 – Okereke	5 – K. Waller	Alico Arena (123); Fort Myers, FL
November 30, 2024*; 5:30 pm, ESPN+		at Southern Utah	L 64–74	4–4	20 – Stephenson	5 – McGhee III	3 – K. Waller	America First Event Center (995); Cedar City, UT
December 5, 2024; 7:00 pm, ESPN+		at UC Irvine	L 66–82	4–5 (0–1)	24 – Jones	10 – Odunewu	3 – Tied	Bren Events Center (2,074); Irvine, CA
December 7, 2024; 7:00 pm, ESPN+		at UC San Diego	L 60–81	4–6 (0–2)	11 – Hardy	7 – Stephenson	2 – Tied	LionTree Arena (1,862); La Jolla, CA
December 15, 2024*; 5:00 pm, ESPN+		La Sierra	W 96–47	5–6	35 – McGhee III	8 – Stephenson	6 – Hardy	Icardo Center (589); Bakersfield, CA
December 18, 2024*; 5:00 pm, ESPN+		at Portland	W 81–64	6–6	22 – Hardy	6 – Tied	4 – Tied	Chiles Center (732); Portland, OR
December 21, 2024*; 6:30 pm, ESPN+		Portland State	L 58–59	6–7	15 – Okereke	7 – Stephenson	3 – Jones	Icardo Center (732); Bakersfield, CA
December 23, 2024*; 5:00 pm, ESPN+		at North Dakota State	L 60–94	6–8	28 – Jones	5 – Alexander	2 – McGhee III	Scheels Center (1,378); Fargo, ND
January 2, 2025; 6:30 pm, ESPN+		UC Davis	W 75–64	7–8 (1–2)	20 – Hardy	13 – Stephenson	5 – Hardy	Icardo Center (705); Bakersfield, CA
January 4, 2025; 6:30 pm, ESPN+		Long Beach State	W 80–65	8–8 (2–2)	25 – Jones	11 – Stephenson	3 – Mark	Icardo Center (797); Bakersfield, CA
January 9, 2025; 7:00 pm, ESPN+		at UC Santa Barbara	L 66–78	8–9 (2–3)	25 – Hardy	5 – McGhee IV	3 – Tied	The Thunderdome (2,757); Santa Barbara, CA
January 11, 2025; 6:30 pm, ESPN+		Cal State Northridge	W 84-80	9–9 (3–3)	48 – Jones	5 – Odunewu	2 – Tied	Icardo Center (850); Bakersfield, CA
January 18, 2025; 9:00 pm, ESPN+		at Hawai'i	L 70–81	9–10 (3–4)	29 – Jones	9 – Jones	2 – Jones	Stan Sheriff Center (5,803); Honolulu, HI
January 23, 2025; 7:00 pm, ESPN+		at Cal State Fullerton	W 71–68	10–10 (4–4)	22 – Jones	9 – McGhee III	5 – Jones	Titan Gym; Fullerton, CA
January 25, 2025; 6:30 pm, ESPN+		UC Riverside	L 79–83	10–11 (4–5)	20 – Jones	5 – Jones	3 – Jones	Icardo Center (1,088); Bakersfield, CA
January 30, 2025; 6:30 pm, ESPN+		Cal Poly	L 81–90	10–12 (4–6)	29 – McGhee III	7 – Stephenson	4 – Stephenson	Icardo Center (1,905); Bakersfield, CA
February 1, 2025; 5:00 pm, ESPN+		at Cal State Northridge	L 62–88	10–13 (4–7)	13 – Tied	6 – Alexander	3 – Jones	Premier America Credit Union Arena (907); Northridge, CA
February 6, 2025; 6:30 pm, ESPN+		UC Santa Barbara	L 75–81	10–14 (4–8)	19 – Hardy	6 – Okereke	7 – Stephenson	Icardo Center (1,091); Bakersfield, CA
February 8, 2025; 7:00 pm, ESPN+		at UC Riverside	L 64–69	10–15 (4–9)	20 – Hardy	6 – Hardy	5 – Jones	SRC Arena (765); Riverside, CA
February 13, 2025; 6:30 pm, ESPN+		UC San Diego	L 54–73	10–16 (4–10)	29 – Jones	8 – Tied	4 – Jones	Icardo Center (876); Bakersfield, CA
February 15, 2025; 1:00 pm, ESPN+		Cal State Fullerton	W 91–54	11–16 (5–10)	25 – Jones	11 – Stephenson	4 – Tied	Icardo Center (627); Bakersfield, CA
February 20, 2025; 6:00 pm, ESPN+		at UC Davis	W 71–66	12–16 (6–10)	18 – McGhee IV	11 – Okereke	4 – Waller	University Credit Union Center (1,213); Davis, CA
February 22, 2025; 6:30 pm, ESPN+		UC Irvine	L 64–73	12–17 (6–11)	18 – Jones	8 – Stephenson	5 – Waller	Icardo Center (1,351); Bakersfield, CA
February 27, 2025; 6:30 pm, ESPN+		at Long Beach State	W 88–87 ^{OT}	13–17 (7–11)	37 – Jones	6 – McGhee III	3 – Tied	Walter Pyramid (1,209); Long Beach, CA
March 1, 2025; 2:00 pm, ESPN+		at Cal Poly	L 72–98	13–18 (7–12)	18 – McGhee III	7 – Alexander	3 – Hardy	Mott Athletics Center (1,503); San Luis Obispo, CA
March 6, 2025; 6:30 pm, ESPN+		Hawai'i	W 76–64	14–18 (8–12)	29 – Jones	6 – Tied	3 – Hardy	Icardo Center (1,158); Bakersfield, CA
Big West tournament
March 12, 2025; 6:00 p.m., ESPN+	(8)	vs. (5) UC Santa Barbara; First round	L 66–71	14–19	15 – Jones	9 – Stephenson	4 – Jones	Lee's Family Forum; Henderson, NV
*Non-conference game. ^{#}Rankings from AP Poll. (#) Tournament seedings in parentheses. All times are in Pacific.
