= 2024–25 Cal State Fullerton Titans men's basketball team =

American college basketball season

2024–25 Cal State Fullerton Titans men's basketball
- Conference: Big West Conference
- Record: 6–26 (1–19 Big West)
- Head coach: Dedrique Taylor (12th season)
- Assistant coaches: Chris Walker; Ryan Hamm; Jayson Wells
- Home arena: Titan Gym (Capacity: 4,000)

2024–25 Big West men's basketball standings
	Conf.				Overall
Team	W		L	PCT	W		L	PCT
UC San Diego †	18	–	2	.900	30	–	5	.857
UC Irvine	17	–	3	.850	32	–	7	.821
UC Riverside	14	–	6	.700	21	–	13	.618
Cal State Northridge	14	–	6	.700	22	–	11	.667
UC Santa Barbara	11	–	9	.550	21	–	13	.618
UC Davis	9	–	11	.450	15	–	17	.469
Cal Poly	8	–	12	.400	16	–	19	.457
Cal State Bakersfield	8	–	12	.400	14	–	19	.424
Hawai'i	7	–	13	.350	15	–	16	.484
Long Beach State	3	–	17	.150	7	–	25	.219
Cal State Fullerton	1	–	19	.050	6	–	26	.188
† 2025 Big West tournament winner

The 2024–25 Cal State Fullerton Titans men's basketball team represented California State University, Fullerton in the 2024–25 NCAA Division I men's basketball season. The Titans, led by 12th-year head coach Dedrique Taylor, played their home games at Titan Gym in Fullerton, California as a member of the Big West Conference.

== Previous season ==
The Titans finished the 2023–24 season 14–18, 7–13 in Big West play to finish in 10th place. They failed to qualify for the Big West Conference tournament, as only the top eight teams are eligible to participate.

== Roster ==
2024–25 Cal State Fullerton Titans men's basketball team
Players
Coaches

Pos.	#	Name	Height	Weight	Year	Previous school	Hometown
F	0	Jalen Cooper	6 ft 6 in (1.98 m)	200 lb (91 kg)	Sr	Palm Beach Atlantic	St. Petersburg, Florida
G	1	Keith Richard	6 ft 1 in (1.85 m)	180 lb (82 kg)	So	South Oak Cliff High School	Dallas, Texas
G	2	Freddie Cooper	6 ft 3 in (1.91 m)	175 lb (79 kg)	Jr	Moberly Area Community College	St. Louis, Missouri
G	3	Kobe Young	6 ft 7 in (2.01 m)	208 lb (94 kg)	Jr	Boise State	Pasco, Washington
G	5	Donovan Oday	6 ft 2 in (1.88 m)	185 lb (84 kg)	Jr	McNeese	Arlington, Texas
F	7	Davis Bynum	6 ft 9 in (2.06 m)	210 lb (95 kg)	Fr	East St. Louis High School	O'Fallon, Illinois
G	10	Antwan Robinson	6 ft 4 in (1.93 m)	210 lb (95 kg)	So	East St. Louis High School	St. Louis, Missouri
G	11	Zion Richardson	6 ft 4 in (1.93 m)	210 lb (95 kg)	Sr	Quincy	Frisco, Texas
C	12	Zachary Visentin	6 ft 9 in (2.06 m)	280 lb (127 kg)	Sr	Snow College	Spanish Fork, Utah
G	13	Kaleb Brown	6 ft 7 in (2.01 m)	245 lb (111 kg)	Jr	Missouri	Huntsville, Alabama
G	14	Simon Tilahun	6 ft 1 in (1.85 m)	160 lb (73 kg)	So	Cal State Northridge	Los Angeles, California
G	21	Kidus Tilahun	6 ft 1 in (1.85 m)	160 lb (73 kg)	Fr	Los Altos High School	Los Angeles, California
G	22	LoLo Rudolph	6 ft 2 in (1.88 m)	180 lb (82 kg)	Fr	St. Augustine High School	San Diego, California
F/C	24	Kendrick De Luna	6 ft 10 in (2.08 m)	230 lb (104 kg)	So	TMI Episcopal	San Antonio, Texas
F	32	John Mikey Square	6 ft 6 in (1.98 m)	225 lb (102 kg)	Sr	Fairleigh Dickinson	Miami, Florida

Head coach

- Dedrique Taylor (UC Davis)

Assistant coach(es)

- Chris Walker (Oklahoma)
- Ryan Hamm (Thomas More)
- Jayson Wells (Indiana State)

Legend

- (C) Team captain
- (S) Suspended
- (I) Ineligible
- (W) Walk-on
- Injured
- Current redshirt

Roster
Last update: October 14, 2024

== Schedule and results ==
Date time, TV	Rank^{#}	Opponent^{#}	Result	Record	High points	High rebounds	High assists	Site (attendance) city, state
Regular season
November 4, 2024*; 7:00 p.m., ESPN+		at Grand Canyon	L 79–89	0–1	17 – Brown	4 – Tied	4 – Richardson	Global Credit Union Arena (7,053); Phoenix, Arizona
November 8, 2024*; 1:00 p.m., ACCNX/ESPN+		at Stanford	L 53–80	0–2	13 – Square	4 – Tied	1 – Tied	Maples Pavilion (1,818); Stanford, California
November 13, 2024*; 6:00 p.m., ESPN+		at Colorado	L 53–83	0–3	13 – Oday	7 – Oday	2 – Bynum	CU Events Center (5,358); Boulder, CO
November 15, 2024*; 7:00 p.m., ESPN+		at Oregon State	L 51–70	0–4	12 – Bynum	5 – Tied	6 – Brown	Gill Coliseum (2,737); Corvallis, Oregon
November 18, 2024*; 7:00 p.m., ESPN+		Idaho State	W 62–61	1–4	17 – Square	7 – Oday	5 – Rudolph	Titan Gym (867); Fullerton, CA
November 22, 2024*; 7:00 p.m., BTN		at UCLA	L 47–80	1–5	10 – Tied	8 – Tied	3 – Cooper	Pauley Pavilion (5,078); Los Angeles, CA
November 26, 2024*; 6:00 p.m., ESPN+		at Pepperdine	W 72–63	2–5	15 – Oday	8 – Young	2 – Tied	Firestone Fieldhouse (453); Malibu, CA
November 30, 2024*; 4:30 p.m., ESPN+		at Pacific	L 55–64	2–6	14 – Square	6 – Oday	4 – Visentin	Alex G. Spanos Center (979); Stockton, CA
December 5, 2024; 7:00 p.m., ESPN+		Long Beach State	L 56–73	2–7 (0–1)	10 – De Luna	7 – Young	2 – Tied	Titan Gym (2,576); Fullerton, CA
December 7, 2024; 5:00 p.m., ESPN+		at UC Riverside	L 68–75	2–8 (0–2)	17 – Brown	8 – Oday	5 – Square	Student Recreation Center Arena (776); Riverside, California
December 10, 2024*; 6:00 p.m., ESPN+		La Sierra	W 61–55	3–8	11 – Tied	7 – Square	2 – Tied	Titan Gym (458); Fullerton, CA
December 15, 2024*; 2:00 p.m., ESPN+		Denver	W 74–59	4–8	21 – Oday	8 – Oday	3 – Oday	Titan Gym (405); Fullerton, CA
December 22, 2024*; 2:00 p.m., ESPN+		Wyoming	L 69–73	4–9	18 – Oday	5 – Tied	3 – Brown	Titan Gym (468); Fullerton, CA
December 28, 2024*; 2:00 p.m., ESPN+		Nobel	W 93–60	5–9	28 – Richard	11 – Oday	4 – Brown	Titan Gym (427); Fullerton, CA
January 2, 2025; 7:00 p.m., ESPN+		Cal State Northridge	L 65–95	5–10 (0–3)	15 – Oday	10 – Young	2 – Tied	Titan Gym (412); Fullerton, CA
January 4, 2025; 6:00 p.m., ESPN+		UC San Diego	L 51–90	5–11 (0–4)	12 – Robinson	7 – Young	2 – Brown	Titan Gym (521); Fullerton, CA
January 9, 2025; 6:00 p.m., ESPN+		at UC Davis	L 53–63	5–12 (0–5)	13 – Richardson	11 – Young	1 – Tied	University Credit Union Center (1,372); Davis, California
January 11, 2025; 6:00 p.m., ESPN+		Hawaii	L 86–95	5–13 (0–6)	29 – Oday	5 – Rudolph	2 – Oday	Titan Gym (513); Fullerton, CA
January 16, 2025; 7:00 p.m., ESPN+		at UC Irvine	L 62–82	5–14 (0–7)	14 – Richardson	11 – Richardson	4 – Richardson	Bren Events Center (3,106); Irvine, CA
January 18, 2025; 4:00 p.m., ESPN+		at Long Beach State	W 83–67	6–14 (1–7)	24 – Oday	7 – Visentin	4 – Oday	Walter Pyramid (2,111); Long Beach, CA
January 23, 2025; 7:00 p.m., ESPN+		Cal State Bakersfield	L 68–71	6–15 (1–8)	20 – Oday	8 – Robinson	3 – Robinson	Titan Gym; Fullerton, CA
January 25, 2025; 6:00 p.m., ESPN+		UC Santa Barbara	L 75–83	6–16 (1–9)	16 – Richardson	10 – Richardson	3 – Rudolph	Titan Gym (373); Fullerton, CA
February 1, 2025; 10:00 p.m., ESPN+		at Hawaii	L 57–82	6–17 (1–10)	13 – Oday	8 – De Luna	2 – Tied	Stan Sheriff Center (5,518); Honolulu, HI
February 6, 2025; 7:00 p.m., ESPN+		at Cal State Northridge	L 63–82	6–18 (1–11)	18 – Oday	7 – De Luna	3 – Tied	Premier America Credit Union Arena (775); Northridge, CA
February 8, 2025; 6:00 p.m., ESPN+		UC Davis	L 49–65	6–19 (1–12)	17 – Visentin	9 – Brown	3 – Brown	Titan Gym (452); Fullerton, CA
February 13, 2025; 7:00 p.m., ESPN+		Cal Poly	L 83–98	6–20 (1–13)	22 – Richard	8 – Oday	2 – Tied	Titan Gym (433); Fullerton, CA
February 15, 2025; 6:30 p.m., ESPN+		at Cal State Bakersfield	L 54–91	6–21 (1–14)	16 – Young	13 – Young	4 – Richard	Icardo Center (627); Bakersfield, CA
February 20, 2025; 7:00 p.m., ESPN+		at UC Santa Barbara	L 56–86	6–22 (1–15)	16 – Robinson	8 – Young	4 – Oday	UC Santa Barbara Events Center (2,019); Santa Barbara, CA
February 27, 2025; 7:00 p.m., ESPN+		UC Irvine	L 51–76	6–23 (1–16)	10 – De Luna	12 – Brown	2 – Tied	Titan Gym (1,013); Fullerton, CA
March 1, 2025; 7:00 p.m., ESPN+		at UC San Diego	L 55–100	6–24 (1–17)	13 – Robinson	10 – Robinson	3 – Tied	RIMAC (2,019); La Jolla, CA
March 6, 2025; 7:00 p.m., ESPN+		at Cal Poly	L 61–100	6–25 (1–18)	17 – Robinson	9 – Young	3 – Tied	Mott Athletics Center (1,284); San Luis Obispo, CA
March 8, 2025; 6:00 p.m., ESPN+		UC Riverside; Senior Night	L 59–64	6–26 (1–19)	14 – Brown	11 – Young	3 – Richard	Titan Gym (675); Fullerton, CA
*Non-conference game. ^{#}Rankings from AP poll. (#) Tournament seedings in parentheses. All times are in Pacific.

== Game summaries ==
This section will be filled in as the season progresses.

=== at Grand Canyon ===
ESPN+

November 4th, 2024
7:00 p.m. PST

Recap

Cal State Fullerton Titans 79, Grand Canyon Antelopes 89
Scoring by half: 45-47, 34-42
Pts: Kaleb Brown - 17; Rebs: tied - 4 Asts: Zion Richardson - 4	Pts: JaKobe Coles - 26; Rebs: JaKobe Coles - 13; Asts: Ray Harrison - 4

Global Credit Union Arena • Phoenix, Arizona
Attendance: 7,053
Referees: Wilson Holland, Martin Cichocki, Bill Vinovich

=== at Stanford ===
ACCNX/ESPN+

November 8th, 2024
1:00 p.m. PST

Cal State Fullerton Titans vs. Stanford Cardinal

Maples Pavilion • Stanford, California

=== at Colorado ===
ESPN+

November 13th, 2024
6:00 p.m. PST

Cal State Fullerton Titans vs. Colorado Buffaloes

CU Events Center • Boulder, Colorado

=== at Oregon State ===
ESPN+

November 15th, 2024
7:00 p.m. PST

Cal State Fullerton Titans vs. Oregon State Beavers

Gill Coliseum • Corvallis, Oregon

=== vs Idaho State ===
ESPN+

November 18th, 2024
7:00 p.m. PST

Idaho State Bengals vs. Cal State Fullerton Titans

Titan Gym • Fullerton, California

=== at UCLA ===
BTN

November 22nd, 2024
7:00 p.m. PST

Cal State Fullerton Titans vs. UCLA Bruins

Pauley Pavilion • Los Angeles, California

=== at Pepperdine ===
ESPN+

November 26th, 2024
6:00 p.m. PST

Cal State Fullerton Titans vs. Pepperdine Waves

Firestone Fieldhouse • Malibu, California
