= Boardwalk Battle =

College basketball tournament

GEICO Boardwalk Battle
Tournament information
- Sport: College basketball
- Location: Ocean Center; Daytona Beach, Florida
- Month played: November
- Established: 2024
- Administrator: Gazelle Group
- Teams: 8
- Website: GEICO Boardwalk Battle

Current champion
- High Point (1)

The GEICO Boardwalk Battle, owned and operated by The Gazelle Group, is an eight team early-season college basketball tournament that was first contested during the 2024–25 season, that takes place in late November of each year, in Daytona Beach, Florida, at the Ocean Center. The Northeast Conference is the sponsor of the tournament, Boardwalk Battle was created to showcase the top mid-major programs. All games in the tournament are streamed by BallerTV.

== Champions ==
Year	Champion
2024	UC San Diego
2025	High Point

== Bracket ==
* – Denotes overtime period

=== 2025 ===
Semifinals; November 20
Incarnate Word	87
Southern Indiana	81
High Point	90
UIC	80

Championship; November 22
Incarnate Word	80
High Point	91
3rd place Game; November 22
Southern Indiana	73
UIC	84

=== 2024 ===
5th Place Game; November 23
UIC	55
East Carolina	72
7th Place Game; November 23
La Salle	92
Stetson	77

Consolation 2nd Round; November 22
UIC	96
La Salle	83
East Carolina	71
Stetson	64

Quarterfinals
James Madison	99
UIC	81
La Salle	67
UC San Diego	72
East Carolina	78
Jacksonville State	85
Toledo	103
Stetson	78

Semifinals
James Madison	67
UC San Diego	73
Jacksonville State	80
Toledo	82

Championship; November 23
UC San Diego	80
Toledo	45
3rd Place Game; November 23
James Madison	71
Jacksonville State	65
