= 2024–25 Long Beach State Beach men's basketball team =

American college basketball season

2024–25 Long Beach State Beach men's basketball
- Conference: Big West Conference
- Record: 7–25 (3–17 Big West)
- Head coach: Chris Acker (1st season)
- Assistant coaches: John Montgomery; Anthony Santos; Phillip Scott
- Home arena: Walter Pyramid

2024–25 Big West men's basketball standings
	Conf.				Overall
Team	W		L	PCT	W		L	PCT
UC San Diego †	18	–	2	.900	30	–	5	.857
UC Irvine	17	–	3	.850	32	–	7	.821
UC Riverside	14	–	6	.700	21	–	13	.618
Cal State Northridge	14	–	6	.700	22	–	11	.667
UC Santa Barbara	11	–	9	.550	21	–	13	.618
UC Davis	9	–	11	.450	15	–	17	.469
Cal Poly	8	–	12	.400	16	–	19	.457
Cal State Bakersfield	8	–	12	.400	14	–	19	.424
Hawai'i	7	–	13	.350	15	–	16	.484
Long Beach State	3	–	17	.150	7	–	25	.219
Cal State Fullerton	1	–	19	.050	6	–	26	.188
† 2025 Big West tournament winner

The 2024–25 Long Beach State Beach men's basketball team represented California State University, Long Beach during the 2024–25 NCAA Division I men's basketball season. The Beach, led by 1st-year head coach Chris Acker, played their home games at the Walter Pyramid in Long Beach, California as a member of the Big West Conference.

== Previous season ==
The Beach finished the 2023–24 season 21–15, 10–10 in Big West play to finish in fifth place. As the #4 seed in the Big West tournament, they would beat UC Riverside in the quarterfinals, the top-seeded UC Irvine in the semifinals, and then would defeat UC Davis in the championship game for their first Big West title since 2012, in turn earning the conference's automatic bid to the NCAA tournament. They received the #15 seed in the West Region, where they would fall to #9 (#2 region seed) Arizona in the First Round.

== Roster ==
2024–25 Long Beach State Beach men's basketball team
Players
Coaches

Pos.	#	Name	Height	Weight	Year	Hometown
F	0	Austin Johnson	6 ft 10 in (2.08 m)	235 lb (107 kg)	GS	Austell, Georgia
F	1	Derrick Michael Xzavierro	6 ft 10 in (2.08 m)	235 lb (107 kg)	So	Jakarta, Indonesia
G	2	Kam Martin	6 ft 4 in (1.93 m)	175 lb (79 kg)	Fr	Montgomery Village, Maryland
G	5	Jason Hart Jr.	6 ft 2 in (1.88 m)	185 lb (84 kg)	So	Los Angeles, California
G	6	Grant Martin	6 ft 8 in (2.03 m)	180 lb (82 kg)	Jr	Riverside, California
G	8	Eli Djordjevic	6 ft 8 in (2.03 m)	210 lb (95 kg)	RS Fr	White Rock, British Columbia
G	9	Devin Askew	6 ft 5 in (1.96 m)	195 lb (88 kg)	Sr	Sacramento, California
G	10	TJ Wainwright	6 ft 3 in (1.91 m)	190 lb (86 kg)	Jr	Los Angeles, California
G	11	Varick Lewis	6 ft 3 in (1.91 m)	210 lb (95 kg)	So	Elk Grove, California
G	12	Zach Buley	6 ft 3 in (1.91 m)	180 lb (82 kg)	Fr	Beaumont, California
G/F	13	Cam Denson	6 ft 7 in (2.01 m)	210 lb (95 kg)	Sr	Compton, California
C	15	Christian Richardson	7 ft 1 in (2.16 m)	230 lb (104 kg)	Jr	Rancho Cucamonga, California
G	22	Ramel Lloyd Jr.	6 ft 6 in (1.98 m)	215 lb (98 kg)	RS Fr	Long Beach, California
F	44	Andrew Nagy	6 ft 9 in (2.06 m)	225 lb (102 kg)	Fr	Anaheim, California
G	55	Cory Curtis Jr.	6 ft 5 in (1.96 m)	175 lb (79 kg)	Jr	Los Angeles, California

Head coach

- Chris Acker (Chaminade)

Assistant coach(es)

- John Montgomery (Loyola Marymount)
- Anthony Santos (Cal State Fullerton)
- Phillip Scott (Prairie View A&M)

Legend

- (C) Team captain
- (S) Suspended
- (I) Ineligible
- (W) Walk-on
- Injured
- Current redshirt

Roster
Last update: October 14, 2024

== Schedule and results ==
Date time, TV	Rank^{#}	Opponent^{#}	Result	Record	High points	High rebounds	High assists	Site (attendance) city, state
Exhibition
October 28, 2024*; 7:00 pm		Caltech	W 103–35	–	18 – Richardson	12 – Richardson	7 – Askew	Walter Pyramid (1,272); Long Beach, CA
Regular season
November 4, 2024*; 7:00 pm, ESPN+		La Verne	W 93–48	1–0	20 – Askew	12 – Xzavierro	5 – Askew	Walter Pyramid (2,037); Long Beach, CA
November 8, 2024*; 6:15 pm, SLN		at South Dakota State	L 79–80	1–1	27 – Askew	8 – Johnson	8 – Askew	First Bank and Trust Arena (3,646); Brookings, SD
November 13, 2024*; 7:00 pm, ESPN+		at San Francisco	L 54–84	1–2	12 – Askew	4 – Tied	3 – Askew	Sobrato Center (1,928); San Francisco, CA
November 16, 2024*; 2:00 pm, ESPN+		Portland	L 61–63	1–3	15 – Tied	9 – Denson	6 – Askew	Walter Pyramid (1,945); Long Beach, CA
November 20, 2024*; 6:00 pm, ESPN+		at No. 3 Gonzaga	L 41–84	1–4	12 – Askew	11 – Xzavierro	2 – Denson	McCarthey Athletic Center (6,000); Spokane, WA
November 23, 2024*; 2:00 pm, ESPN+		Fresno State	L 69–72	1–5	19 – Askew	11 – Johnson	4 – Wainwright	Walter Pyramid (1,805); Long Beach, CA
November 25, 2024*; 8:00 pm, FloHoops		vs. UNC Greensboro; Ball Dawgs Classic	L 48–71	1–6	16 – Askew	6 – Xzavierro	2 – Tied	Lee's Family Forum; Henderson, NV
November 26, 2024*; 5:30 pm, FloHoops		vs. UTEP; Ball Dawgs Classic	L 44–70	1–7	21 – Askew	6 – Johnson	2 – Askew	Lee's Family Forum; Henderson, NV
November 27, 2024*; 8:00 pm, FloHoops		vs. San Jose State; Ball Dawgs Classic	L 66–82	1–8	17 – K. Martin	9 – Xzavierro	7 – K. Martin	Lee's Family Forum; Henderson, NV
December 5, 2024; 7:00 pm, ESPN+		at Cal State Fullerton	W 73–56	2–8 (1–0)	16 – Askew	9 – Xzavierro	4 – Wainwright	Titan Gym (2,576); Fullerton, CA
December 7, 2024; 4:00 pm, ESPN+		Hawaii	W 76–68	3–8 (2–0)	28 – Askew	10 – Johnson	7 – Askew	Walter Pyramid (1,446); Long Beach, CA
December 10, 2024*; 7:00 pm, ESPN+		at San Diego	W 76–70	4–8	25 – K. Martin	7 – Wainwright	8 – Askew	Jenny Craig Pavilion (531); San Diego, CA
December 19, 2024*; 6:00 pm, ESPN+		at Pepperdine	W 79–76	5–8	26 – Wainwright	8 – Wainwright	3 – Askew	Firestone Fieldhouse (389); Malibu, CA
December 22, 2024*; 2:00 pm, ESPN+		La Sierra	W 83–57	6–8	18 – K. Martin	12 – Xzavierro	8 – Askew	Walter Pyramid (1,074); Long Beach, CA
January 2, 2025; 7:00 pm, ESPN+		UC Riverside	L 60–76	6–9 (2–1)	17 – Askew	8 – Tied	5 – Askew	Walter Pyramid (2,135); Long Beach, CA
January 4, 2025; 6:30 pm, ESPN+		at Cal State Bakersfield	L 65–80	6–10 (2–2)	21 – Askew	5 – Johnson	4 – Askew	Icardo Center (797); Bakersfield, CA
January 11, 2025; 2:00 pm, ESPN+		at UC Davis	W 84–73	7–10 (3–2)	32 – Askew	7 – Denson	5 – Askew	University Credit Union Center (2,263); Davis, CA
January 16, 2025; 7:00 pm, ESPN+		UC San Diego	L 54–80	7–11 (3–3)	12 – Lewis	6 – Xzavierro	5 – Askew	The Gold Mine (1,478); Long Beach, CA
January 18, 2025; 4:00 pm, ESPN+		Cal State Fullerton	L 67–83	7–12 (3–4)	31 – Wainwright	7 – Djordjevic	3 – Denson	The Gold Mine (2,111); Long Beach, CA
January 23, 2025; 7:00 pm, ESPN+		at Cal State Northridge	L 76–86	7–13 (3–5)	27 – Wainwright	9 – Xzavierro	10 – Askew	Premier America Credit Union Arena (969); Northridge, CA
January 25, 2025; 2:00 pm, ESPN+		at Cal Poly	L 69–78	7–14 (3–6)	35 – Askew	9 – Johnson	2 – Tied	Mott Athletics Center (1,726); San Luis Obispo, CA
January 30, 2025; 7:00 pm, ESPN+		UC Irvine; Black and Blue Rivalry	L 75–80 ^{OT}	7–15 (3–7)	18 – Askew	14 – Xzavierro	8 – Askew	Walter Pyramid (2,012); Long Beach, CA
February 1, 2025; 7:00 pm, ESPN+		at UC Santa Barbara	L 54–85	7–16 (3–8)	23 – Askew	10 – Askew	3 – Askew	The Thunderdome (2,212); Santa Barbara, CA
February 6, 2025; 7:00 pm, ESPN+		UC Davis	L 65–79 ^{OT}	7–17 (3–9)	17 – Askew	7 – Johnson	4 – Tied	Walter Pyramid (1,904); Long Beach, CA
February 8, 2025; 4:00 pm, ESPN+		Cal State Northridge	L 80–81	7–18 (3–10)	22 – Askew	7 – Askew	11 – Askew	Walter Pyramid (1,557); Long Beach, CA
February 13, 2025; 10:00 pm, ESPN+		at Hawaii	L 60–62	7–19 (3–11)	20 – Wainwright	6 – Askew	3 – Askew	Stan Sheriff Center (4,358); Honolulu, HI
February 20, 2025; 7:00 pm, ESPN+		at UC Riverside	L 66–87	7–20 (3–12)	22 – Johnson	6 – Tied	4 – Askew	SRC Arena (1,276); Riverside, CA
February 22, 2025; 4:00 pm, ESPN+		UC Santa Barbara	L 56–58	7–21 (3–13)	15 – Askew	11 – Xzavierro	3 – Askew	Walter Pyramid (1,863); Long Beach, CA
February 27, 2025; 7:00 pm, ESPN+		Cal State Bakersfield	L 87–88 ^{OT}	7–22 (3–13)	22 – Wainwright	10 – Xzavierro	8 – Askew	Walter Pyramid (1,209); Long Beach, CA
March 1, 2025; 7:00 pm, ESPN+		at UC Irvine	L 60–70	7–23 (3–15)	25 – Askew	9 – Johnson	5 – Hart Jr.	Bren Events Center (4,722); Irvine, CA
March 6, 2025; 7:00 pm, ESPN+		at UC San Diego	L 63–70	7–24 (3–16)	29 – Askew	12 – Johnson	3 – Hart Jr.	LionTree Arena (2,987); La Jolla, CA
March 8, 2025; 4:00 pm, ESPN+		Cal Poly	L 69–83	7–25 (3–17)	21 – Askew	8 – Tied	5 – Hart Jr.	Walter Pyramid (1,524); Long Beach, CA
*Non-conference game. ^{#}Rankings from AP poll. (#) Tournament seedings in parentheses. All times are in Pacific.
