= 2025 Big West Conference men's basketball tournament =

American college basketball postseason tournament

- Classification: Division I
- Season: 2024–25
- Teams: 8
- Site: Lee's Family Forum; Henderson, Nevada
- Champions: UC San Diego (1st title)
- Winning coach: Eric Olen (1st title)
- Television: ESPN+, ESPNU, ESPN2

2024–25 Big West men's basketball standings
	Conf.				Overall
Team	W		L	PCT	W		L	PCT
UC San Diego †	18	–	2	.900	30	–	5	.857
UC Irvine	17	–	3	.850	32	–	7	.821
UC Riverside	14	–	6	.700	21	–	13	.618
Cal State Northridge	14	–	6	.700	22	–	11	.667
UC Santa Barbara	11	–	9	.550	21	–	13	.618
UC Davis	9	–	11	.450	15	–	17	.469
Cal Poly	8	–	12	.400	16	–	19	.457
Cal State Bakersfield	8	–	12	.400	14	–	19	.424
Hawai'i	7	–	13	.350	15	–	16	.484
Long Beach State	3	–	17	.150	7	–	25	.219
Cal State Fullerton	1	–	19	.050	6	–	26	.188
† 2025 Big West tournament winner

The 2025 Big West Conference men's basketball tournament was the postseason men's basketball tournament for the Big West Conference of the 2024–25 NCAA Division I men's basketball season. It was held March 12–15, 2025, at the Lee's Family Forum in Henderson, Nevada. The winner, UC San Diego, received the conference's automatic bid to the 2025 NCAA tournament. The Tritons were in their first year of Division I eligibility.

== Seeds ==
The top eight teams in the conference standings qualified for the tournament. Teams were seeded by record within the conference, with a tiebreaker system to seed teams with identical conference records. The top two seeds received double byes to the semifinals, the third and fourth seeds received single byes to the quarterfinals, and the remaining four seeds played each other in the first round.

Seed	School	Record	Tiebreaker
1	UC San Diego	18–2	
2	UC Irvine	17–3	
3	UC Riverside	14–6	2–0 vs. Cal State Northridge
4	Cal State Northridge	14–6	0–2 vs. UC Riverside
5	UC Santa Barbara	11–9	
6	UC Davis	9–11	
7	Cal Poly	8–12	2–0 vs. Cal State Bakersfield
8	Cal State Bakersfield	8–12	0–2 vs. Cal Poly
DNQ	Hawai'i	7–13	
DNQ	Long Beach State	3–17	
DNQ	Cal State Fullerton	1-19	

== Schedule and results ==
Game	Time	Matchup	Score	Television
First round – Wednesday, March 12
1	6:00 pm	No. 5 UC Santa Barbara vs. No. 8 Cal State Bakersfield	71–66	ESPN+
2	8:30 pm	No. 6 UC Davis vs. No. 7 Cal Poly	76–86	ESPN+
Quarterfinals – Thursday, March 13
3	6:00 pm	No. 4 Cal State Northridge vs. No. 5 UC Santa Barbara	72–78	ESPN+
4	8:30 pm	No. 3 UC Riverside vs. No. 7 Cal Poly	83–96	ESPN+
Semifinals – Friday, March 14
5	6:00 pm	No. 1 UC San Diego vs. No. 5 UC Santa Barbara	69–51	ESPN+ (Live) / ESPNU (Delay)
6	8:30 pm	No. 2 UC Irvine vs. No. 7 Cal Poly	96–78	ESPN2
Final – Saturday, March 15
7	6:40 pm	No. 1 UC San Diego vs. No. 2 UC Irvine	75–61	ESPN2
*Game times in PDT. Rankings denote tournament seed.

== Bracket ==
First Round; Wednesday, March 12
5	UC Santa Barbara	71
8	Cal State Bakersfield	66
6	UC Davis	76
7	Cal Poly	86

Quarterfinals; Thursday, March 13
4	Cal State Northridge	72
5	UC Santa Barbara	78
3	UC Riverside	83
7	Cal Poly	96

Semifinals; Friday, March 14
1	UC San Diego	69
5	UC Santa Barbara	51
2	UC Irvine	96
7	Cal Poly	78

Championship; Saturday, March 15
1	UC San Diego	75
2	UC Irvine	61

== Game summaries ==
=== First round ===
ESPN+

March 12
6:00 pm

Recap

No. 8 Cal State Bakersfield 66, No. 5 UC Santa Barbara 71
Scoring by half: 25-32, 41–39
Pts: Jemel Jones, 15; Rebs: Corey Stephenson, 9 Asts: Jemel Jones, 4	Pts: Stephan Swenson, 15; Rebs: Kenny Pohto, 7 Asts: Jason Fontenet II, 5

Lee's Family Forum
Henderson, Nevada
Referees: Justin Shamion, Chad Shepherd, Jeff Campbell

ESPN+

March 12
8:30 pm

Recap

No. 7 Cal Poly 86, No. 6 UC Davis 76
Scoring by half: 38-47, 48–29
Pts: Owen Koonce, 18; Rebs: Tied, 5 Asts: Owen Koonce, 6	Pts: Pablo Tamba, 25; Rebs: Tied, 4 Asts: TY Johnson, 11

Lee's Family Forum
Henderson, Nevada
Attendance: 1,105
Referees: Jeffery Malham, Antinio Petty, Bill Vinovich

=== Quarterfinals ===
ESPN+

March 13
6:00 pm

Recap

No. 5 UC Santa Barbara 78, No. 4 Cal State Northridge 72
Scoring by half: 35-28, 43-44
Pts: Stephan Swenson, 25; Rebs: Jason Fontenet II, 5 Asts: Jason Fontenet II, 5	Pts: Keonte Jones, 19; Rebs: Keonte Jones, 11; Asts: Tied, 3

Lee's Family Forum
Henderson, Nevada
Referees: Matthew Rusakin, Eric Curry, Deron White

ESPN+

March 13
8:30 pm

Recap

No. 7 Cal Poly 96, No. 3 UC Riverside 83
Scoring by half: 45–36, 51–47
Pts: Owen Koonce, 20; Rebs: Cayden Ward, 13; Asts: Jarred Hyder, 9	Pts: Isaiah Moses, 30; Rebs: Kaleb Smith, 11; Asts: Barrington Hargress, 5

Lee's Family Forum
Henderson, Nevada
Attendance: 1,185
Referees: Robert Lehigh, Antinio Petty, Darron George

=== Semifinals ===
ESPN+

March 14
6:00 pm

Recap

No. 5 UC Santa Barbara 51, No. 1 UC San Diego 69
Scoring by half: 27-26, 24-43
Pts: Tied, 12; Rebs: Jason Fontenet II, 7 Asts: Stephan Swenson, 6	Pts: Aniwaniwa Tait-Jones, 20; Rebs: Aniwaniwa Tait-Jones, 8 Asts: Aniwaniwa Tait-Jones, 9

Lee's Family Forum
Henderson, Nevada
Referees: Matthew Rusakin, Antonio Petty, Brooks Wells

ESPN2

March 14
8:30 pm

Recap

No. 7 Cal Poly 78, No. 2 UC Irvine 96
Scoring by half: 39-38, 39-58
Pts: Mac Riniker, 22; Rebs: Mac Riniker, 6 Asts: Peter Bandelj, 5	Pts: Bent Leuchten, 21; Rebs: Bent Leuchten, 10; Asts: Devin Tillis, 6

Lee's Family Forum
Henderson, Nevada
Attendance: 2,006
Referees: Deron White, Eric Curry, Bill Vinovich

=== Championship ===
ESPN2

March 15
6:40 pm

Recap

No. 2 UC Irvine 61, No. 1 UC San Diego 75
Scoring by half: 33-31, 28-44
Pts: Justin Hohn, 18; Rebs: Tied, 7 Asts: Devin Tillis, 8	Pts: Hayden Gray, 22; Rebs: Aniwaniwa Tait-Jones, 8 Asts: Aniwaniwa Tait-Jones, 8

Lee's Family Forum
Henderson, Nevada
Attendance: 2,632
Referees: Tony Padilla, Randy McCall, Deron White

== Awards and honors ==
=== All-Tournament Team ===
Name	Pos.	Height	Weight	Year	Team
Hayden Gray	G	6−4	190	Senior	UC San Diego
Jarred Hyder	G	6−3	185	Graduate	Cal Poly
Bent Leuchten	C	7-1	260	Senior	UC Irvine
Stephan Swenson	G	6−2	195	Graduate	UC Santa Barbara
Devin Tillis	F	6−7	225	RS Senior	UC Irvine
Aniwaniwa Tait-Jones	G/F	6−6	200	Senior	UC San Diego

=== Most Outstanding Player ===
Name	Pos.	Height	Weight	Year	Team
Aniwaniwa Tait-Jones	G/F	6−6	200	Senior	UC San Diego

== Statistics ==
=== Top Players By Category ===
Generally, must have scored at least 10 points in the Big West Tournament to be the leader in individual scoring or individual scoring percentage categories.

Individual scoring
Rk	Player	School	G	Pts	PPG
1	Isaiah Moses	UC Riverside	1	30	30.0
2	Pablo Tamba	UC Davis	1	25	25.0
3	Barrington Hargress	UC Riverside	1	21	21.0
4	Keonte Jones	Cal State Northridge	1	19	19.0
4	TY Johnson	UC Davis	1	19	19.0
6	Stephan Swenson	UC Santa Barbara	3	52	17.3
7	Aniwaniwa Tait-Jones	UC San Diego	2	34	17.0
7	Mahmoud Fofana	Cal State Northridge	1	17	17.0
9	Hayden Gray	UC San Diego	2	33	16.5
9	Justin Hohn	UC Irvine	2	33	16.5
11	Jarred Hyder	Cal Poly	3	49	16.3
12	Bent Leuchten	UC Irvine	2	31	15.5
13	Jemel Jones	Cal State Bakersfield	1	15	15.0
14	Devin Tillis	UC Irvine	2	29	14.5

Individual field-goal percentage
Rk	Player	Team	G	FGM	FGA	FG%
1	Aidan Burke	UC San Diego	2	4	4	100.0%
1	Kyle Evans	UC Irvine	2	6	6	100.0%
3	Aaron Price Jr.	Cal Poly	3	10	12	83.3%
4	Mahmoud Fofana	Cal State Northridge	1	4	5	80.0%
5	Keonte Jones	Cal State Northridge	1	6	8	75.0%
5	Pablo Tamba	UC Davis	1	9	12	75.0%
5	CJ Hardy	Cal State Bakersfield	1	6	8	75.0%
8	Hayden Gray	UC San Diego	2	13	19	68.4%
9	Justin Rochelin	UC San Diego	2	5	8	62.5%
10	Kenny Pohto	UC Santa Barbara	3	8	13	61.5%
11	Isaiah Moses	UC Riverside	1	11	18	61.1%
12	Bent Leuchten	UC Irvine	2	10	17	58.8%
13	Barrington Hargress	UC Riverside	1	9	16	56.2%
14	Isaac Jessup	Cal Poly	3	15	28	53.5%
15	Devin Tillis	UC Irvine	2	11	21	52.3%

Individual three-point field-goal percentage
Rk	Player	Team	G	3FGM	3FGA	3FG%
1	Aidan Burke	UC San Diego	2	4	4	100.0%
1	Aaron Price Jr.	Cal Poly	3	2	2	100.0%
1	Jaden Alexander	Cal State Bakersfield	1	2	2	100.0%
1	Keonte Jones	Cal State Northridge	1	1	1	100.0%
5	Hayden Gray	UC San Diego	2	7	10	70.0%
6	Peter Bandelj	Cal Poly	3	8	13	61.5%
7	Torian Lee	UC Irvine	2	3	5	60.0%
8	Owen Koonce	Cal Poly	3	5	10	50.0%
9	Jarred Hyder	Cal Poly	3	11	24	45.8%
10	Cayden Ward	Cal Poly	3	5	11	45.4%
11	Rac Miniker	Cal Poly	3	3	7	42.8%
11	Isaiah Moses	UC Riverside	1	3	7	42.8%
11	Kaleb Smith	UC Riverside	1	3	7	42.8%
11	Devin Tillis	UC Irvine	2	3	7	42.8%
15	Isaac Jessup	Cal Poly	3	8	20	40.0%

Individual free-throw percentage
Rk	Player	Team	G	FTM	FTA	FT%
1	Justin Hohn	UC Irvine	2	7	7	100.0%
1	Keonte Jones	Cal State Northridge	1	6	6	100.0%
1	Ben Sholtzberg	UC Santa Barbara	3	4	4	100.0%
1	Jarred Hyder	Cal Poly	3	4	4	100.0%
1	Devin Tillis	UC Irvine	2	4	4	100.0%
1	Kyle Evans	UC Irvine	2	3	3	100.0%
1	TY Johnson	UC Davis	1	3	3	100.0%
1	Leo DeBruhl	UC Davis	1	2	2	100.0%
1	Jaden Alexander	Cal State Bakersfield	1	2	2	100.0%
1	Cole Anderson	UC Santa Barbara	3	1	1	100.0%
11	Mahmoud Fofana	Cal State Northridge	1	9	10	90.0%
12	Stephan Swenson	UC Santa Barbara	3	7	8	87.5%
13	Myles Che	UC Irvine	2	6	7	85.7%
14	Tyler McGhie	UC San Diego	2	11	13	84.6%
15	Isaiah Moses	UC Riverside	1	5	6	83.3%

Individual rebounding
Rk	Player	Team	G	ORB	DRB	Tot	RPG
1	Kaleb Smith	UC Riverside	1	2	9	11	11.0
1	Keonte Jones	Cal State Northridge	1	1	10	11	11.0
3	Corey Stephenson	Cal State Bakersfield	1	4	5	9	9.0
4	Bent Leuchten	UC Irvine	2	4	13	17	8.5
5	Aniwaniwa Tait-Jones	UC San Diego	2	4	12	16	8.0
5	Mahmoud Fofana	Cal State Northridge	1	3	5	8	8.0
7	Devin Tillis	UC Irvine	2	4	11	15	7.5
8	Scotty Washington	Cal State Northridge	1	2	5	7	7.0
9	Cayden Ward	Cal Poly	3	6	13	19	6.3
10	Jason Fontenet II	UC Santa Barbara	3	7	11	18	6.0
10	Jaden Alexander	Cal State Bakersfield	1	3	3	6	6.0
12	Kenny Pohto	UC Santa Barbara	3	3	13	16	5.3

Individual assists
Rk	Player	Team	G	A	APG
1	TY Johnson	UC Davis	1	11	11.0
2	Aniwaniwa Tait-Jones	UC San Diego	2	17	8.5
3	Devin Tillis	UC Irvine	2	14	7.0
4	Barrington Hargress	UC Riverside	1	5	5.0
5	Jarred Hyder	Cal Poly	3	14	4.6
6	Stephan Swenson	UC Santa Barbara	3	13	4.3
7	Peter Bandelj	Cal Poly	3	12	4.0
7	Jemel Jones	Cal State Bakersfield	1	4	4.0
8	Jason Fontenet II	UC Santa Barbara	3	11	3.6
8	Owen Koonce	Cal Poly	3	11	3.6

Individual blocks
Rk	Player	Team	G	Blk	BPG
1	Aniwaniwa Tait-Jones	UC San Diego	2	4	2.0
1	Niyi Olabode	UC Riverside	1	2	2.0
1	Leo DeBruhl	UC Davis	1	2	2.0
1	Corey Stephenson	Cal State Bakersfield	1	2	2.0
5	Kyle Evans	UC Irvine	2	3	1.5
6	Max Murrell	UC Santa Barbara	3	4	1.3
7	Maximo Milovich	UC San Diego	2	2	1.0
7	Bent Leuchten	UC Irvine	2	2	1.0
7	Koat Keat Tong	UC Santa Barbara	3	3	1.0
7	PJ Fuller II	Cal State Northridge	1	1	1.0
7	Keonte Jones	Cal State Northridge	1	1	1.0
7	TY Johnson	UC Davis	1	1	1.0
7	Sione Lose	UC Davis	1	1	1.0
7	Cameron Clark	Cal State Bakersfield	1	1	1.0

Individual steals
Rk	Player	Team	G	Stl	SPG
1	Stephan Swenson	UC Santa Barbara	3	9	3.0
2	Hayden Gray	UC San Diego	2	5	2.5
3	Rac Miniker	Cal Poly	3	6	2.0
3	Barrington Hargress	UC Riverside	1	2	2.0
3	Nate Pickens	UC Riverside	1	2	2.0
3	Keonte Jones	Cal State Northridge	1	2	2.0
3	Mahmoud Fofana	Cal State Northridge	1	2	2.0
8	Chris Howell	UC San Diego	2	3	1.5
8	Devin Tillis	UC Irvine	2	3	1.5
10	Cole Anderson	UC Santa Barbara	3	4	1.3
10	Owen Koonce	Cal Poly	3	4	1.3
10	Isaac Jessup	Cal Poly	3	4	1.3

=== Team by Team Leaders ===
Team	Games Played	Points		Rebounds		Assists		Steals		Blocks		Minutes	
Cal Poly	3	Jarred Hyder	49	Cayden Ward	19	Jarred Hyder	14	Rac Miniker	6	Owen Koonce	2	Tied	101
Cal State Bakersfield	1	Jemel Jones	15	Corey Stephenson	9	Jemel Jones	4	Tied	1	Corey Stephenson	2	Marvin McGhee III	34
Cal State Northridge	1	Keonte Jones	19	Keonte Jones	11	Tied	3	Tied	2	Tied	1	Keonte Jones	37
UC Davis	1	Pablo Tamba	25	Tied	4	TY Johnson	11	Leo DeBruhl	2	Tied	1	TY Johnson	36
UC Irvine	2	Justin Hohn	33	Bent Leuchten	17	Devin Tillis	14	Devin Tillis	3	Kyle Evans	3	Tied	67
UC Riverside	1	Isaiah Moses	30	Kaleb Smith	11	Barrington Hargress	5	Tied	2	Niyi Olabode	2	Isaiah Moses	34
UC San Diego	2	Aniwaniwa Tait-Jones	34	Aniwaniwa Tait-Jones	16	Aniwaniwa Tait-Jones	17	Hayden Gray	5	Aniwaniwa Tait-Jones	4	Hayden Gray	73
UC Santa Barbara	3	Stephan Swenson	52	Jason Fontenet II	18	Stephan Swenson	13	Stephan Swenson	9	Max Murrell	4	Stephan Swenson	108

== See also ==
2025 Big West Conference women's basketball tournament
