= 2024–25 UC San Diego Tritons men's basketball team =

American college basketball season

2024–25 UC San Diego Tritons men's basketball

Big West regular season & tournament champions Boardwalk Battle champions

NCAA tournament, First Round
- Conference: Big West Conference
- Record: 30–5 (18–2 Big West)
- Head coach: Eric Olen (12th season)
- Associate head coach: Clint Allard
- Assistant coaches: Tom Tankelewicz; Steven Aldridge; Sam Stapleton; Mikey Howell
- Home arena: LionTree Arena

2024–25 Big West men's basketball standings
	Conf.				Overall
Team	W		L	PCT	W		L	PCT
UC San Diego †	18	–	2	.900	30	–	5	.857
UC Irvine	17	–	3	.850	32	–	7	.821
UC Riverside	14	–	6	.700	21	–	13	.618
Cal State Northridge	14	–	6	.700	22	–	11	.667
UC Santa Barbara	11	–	9	.550	21	–	13	.618
UC Davis	9	–	11	.450	15	–	17	.469
Cal Poly	8	–	12	.400	16	–	19	.457
Cal State Bakersfield	8	–	12	.400	14	–	19	.424
Hawai'i	7	–	13	.350	15	–	16	.484
Long Beach State	3	–	17	.150	7	–	25	.219
Cal State Fullerton	1	–	19	.050	6	–	26	.188
† 2025 Big West tournament winner

The 2024–25 UC San Diego Tritons men's basketball team represented the University of California, San Diego during the 2024–25 NCAA Division I men's basketball season. The Tritons, led by 12th-year head coach Eric Olen, played their home games at LionTree Arena in La Jolla, California, as members of the Big West Conference.

This was the first year that the team was eligible for the NCAA Division I men's basketball tournament, as UC San Diego officially completed their transition to Division I sports. In their non-conference play, the Tritons won the Boardwalk Battle regular season competition. UC San Diego finished the regular season with a record of 28–4, and went 18–2 in conference play with losses to UC Irvine at home and UC Riverside on the road, giving them the Big West regular season championship. As the No. 1 seed in their first Big West Conference tournament, they defeated UC Santa Barbara in the semifinals and UC Irvine in the finals, securing them a bid to the NCAA tournament in their first year of eligibility.

In the NCAA Tournament, they were seeded as the No.12 seed in the South region, where they fell short to Michigan 68–65 in the first round. The Tritons ended their season 30–5, 18–2 in Big West play.

The Big West named Eric Olen as the conference’s coach of the year for the second time in a row. Senior Aniwaniwa Tait-Jones was selected on the All-Big West First Team alongside senior Tyler McGhie. Tait-Jones was also named Big West Player of the Year. Senior Hayden Gray was named Best Defensive Player as well as part of the All-Big West Second Team. Junior Chris Howell was named Best Hustle Player and redshirt junior Justin Rochelin was named Best Sixth Player.

== Previous season ==
The Tritons finished the 2023–24 season 21–12, 15–5 in Big West play to finish in second place. Since they were in the final year of the a four-year mandatory transition period from Division II to Division I, they were ineligible to participate in the Big West tournament. They received an invitation to the CBI, receiving the #2 seed, where they would be upset by Chicago State in the first round.

== Offseason ==
=== Departures ===
Seven players from the 2023-24 roster left UC San Diego, including one graduate and five transfers. Michael Pearson Jr. left for Cal State Los Angeles, and Justin DeGraaf donned the Grace College red and white. Francis Nwaokorie transferred to Loyola Chicago, Bryce Pope transferred to the Trojans and Emmanuel Tshimanga went to New Mexico State. J'Raan Brooks signed a contract to play professionally with the Leicester Riders.

Departures
Name	Number	Pos.	Height	Weight	Year	Hometown	Reason for departure
Michael Pearson Jr.	2	G	5'9"	160	RS Sophomore	Tracy, CA	Transferred to Cal State Los Angeles
Justin DeGraaf	3	F	6'7"	210	Junior	Hudsonville, MI	Transferred to Grace College
Bryce Pope	4	G	6'3"	185	RS Senior	San Diego, CA	Transferred to USC
Billy Haggerty	14	F	6'6"	185	Freshman	Lafayette, CA	Not on team roster
Emmanuel Tshimanga	25	C	7'0"	270	RS Senior	Montreal, Quebec	Transferred to New Mexico State
J'Raan Brooks	33	F	6'9"	215	RS Senior	Seattle, WA	Graduated
Francis Nwaokorie	35	F	6'7"	220	Junior	Brooklyn Park, MN	Transferred to Loyola Chicago

=== Incoming transfers ===
UC San Diego added five transfers to its lineup: Justin Rochelin from Oregon State, Chris Howell from Saint Mary's, Nordin Kapic from Lynn, Milos Vicentic from McKendree, and Maximo Milovich from Biola. Kapic, Vicentic and Milovich all transferred from Division II schools.

Incoming transfers
Name	Number	Pos.	Height	Weight	Year	Hometown	Previous School
Justin Rochelin	5	G	6'5"	205	RS Junior	Encino, CA	Oregon State
Chris Howell	8	G	6'6"	195	Junior	San Diego, CA	Saint Mary's
Nordin Kapic	24	F	6'8"	245	Junior	Vienna, Austria	Lynn
Milos Vicentic	31	F	6'7"	220	Graduate Student	Belgrade, Serbia	McKendree
Maximo Milovich	33	F	6'8"	213	Graduate Student	Buenos Aires, Argentina	Biola

=== Recruits ===
College recruiting
Name	Hometown	School	Height	Weight	Commit date
Ryder Elisaldez; G	Las Vegas, NV	Bishop Gorman HS	6 ft 3 in (1.91 m)	175 lb (79 kg)	
Ryder Elisaldez; G	Recruit ratings: No ratings found				
Christopher Cox; G/F	Salt Lake City, UT	Cottonwood HS	6 ft 8 in (2.03 m)	208 lb (94 kg)	
Christopher Cox; G/F	Recruit ratings: No ratings found				
Overall recruit ranking:
Note: In many cases, Scout, Rivals, 247Sports, On3, and ESPN may conflict in their listings of height and weight.; In these cases, the average was taken. ESPN grades are on a 100-point scale.; Sources:

== Preseason ==
=== Big West Conference Preseason Poll ===
The Big West Conference released its preseason coaches' poll on October 15, 2024. The Tritons were predicted to finish third in the conference with 77 points.

Rank	Team	Points
1.	UC Irvine	92 (8)
2.	UC Santa Barbara	85 (2)
3.	UC San Diego	77
4.	UC Riverside	75 (1)
5.	UC Davis	67
6.	Cal State Northridge	57
7.	Hawai'i	46
8.	Long Beach State	39
9.	Cal State Bakersfield	28
10.	Cal State Fullerton	22
11.	Cal Poly	11
(#) first-place votes

=== Big West Preseason All-Big West Team ===
Senior guard/forward Aniwaniwa Tait-Jones was named to the preseason All-Big West Team.

Player	School
Barrington Hargress	UC Riverside
Justin Hohn	UC Irvine
TY Johnson	UC Davis
Keonte Jones	Cal State Northridge
Stephan Swenson	UC Santa Barbara
Aniwaniwa Tait-Jones	UC San Diego

== Roster ==
2024–25 UC San Diego Tritons men's basketball team
Players
Coaches

Pos.	#	Name	Height	Weight	Year	Previous school	Hometown
G	0	Camden McCormick (redshirt)	6 ft 3 in (1.91 m)	190 lb (86 kg)	Jr	Francis Parker School	San Diego, California
G	1	Ryder Elisaldez	6 ft 3 in (1.91 m)	175 lb (79 kg)	Fr	Bishop Gorman HS	Las Vegas, Nevada
G/F	2	Christopher Cox (redshirt)	6 ft 8 in (2.03 m)	208 lb (94 kg)	Fr	Cottonwood HS	Salt Lake City, Utah
G	3	Hayden Gray	6 ft 4 in (1.93 m)	190 lb (86 kg)	Sr	Azusa Pacific	San Diego, California
F	4	Cade Pendleton	6 ft 10 in (2.08 m)	210 lb (95 kg)	RS So	East Hamilton HS	Chattanooga, Tennessee
G	5	Justin Rochelin	6 ft 5 in (1.96 m)	205 lb (93 kg)	RS Jr	Oregon State	Encino, California
G	8	Chris Howell	6 ft 6 in (1.98 m)	195 lb (88 kg)	Jr	Saint Mary's	San Diego, California
G	11	Jasen Brooks	6 ft 0 in (1.83 m)	195 lb (88 kg)	RS Fr	Cleveland HS	Cleveland, Tennessee
G/F	12	Aniwaniwa Tait-Jones	6 ft 6 in (1.98 m)	200 lb (91 kg)	Sr	Hawaii–Hilo	Wellington, New Zealand
G/F	13	Tyler McGhie	6 ft 5 in (1.96 m)	195 lb (88 kg)	Sr	Southern Nazarene	Denton, Texas
G/F	15	Quin Patterson (redshirt)	6 ft 7 in (2.01 m)	205 lb (93 kg)	Jr	Mount Si HS	Snoqualmie, Washington
G	20	Aidan Burke	6 ft 3 in (1.91 m)	190 lb (86 kg)	So	Phillips Exeter Academy	Los Gatos, California
G	22	Yaqub Mir	6 ft 2 in (1.88 m)	175 lb (79 kg)	RS Fr	Granite Bay HS	Granite Bay, California
F	24	Nordin Kapic	6 ft 8 in (2.03 m)	245 lb (111 kg)	Jr	Lynn	Vienna, Austria
F	31	Milos Vicentic	6 ft 7 in (2.01 m)	220 lb (100 kg)	GS	McKendree	Belgrade, Serbia
F	33	Maximo Milovich	6 ft 8 in (2.03 m)	213 lb (97 kg)	GS	Biola	Buenos Aires, Argentina

Head coach

- Eric Olen (Spring Hill)

Assistant coach(es)

- Clint Allard (UC San Diego)
- Tom Tankelewicz (Western Carolina)
- Steven Aldridge (San Diego City)
- Sam Stapleton (Occidental)
- Mikey Howell (UC San Diego)

Legend

- (C) Team captain
- (S) Suspended
- (I) Ineligible
- (W) Walk-on
- Injured
- Current redshirt

Roster
Last update: October 29, 2024

== Regular season ==
=== Early non-conference games ===
==== San Diego State ====
The Tritons started their season at a fully packed Viejas Arena against the San Diego State Aztecs. KSDT Sports, a UC San Diego student-run sports and radio organization, broadcast this event live. Both teams performed neck-to-neck, with six ties and eight changes in leading position, until San Diego State came back on top in the final ten minutes to secure a 63-58 win over UC San Diego. Senior Tyler McGhie led the Tritons with 21 points scored and five out of nine three pointers, while Aniwaniwa Tait-Jones, another senior, was the only other Triton who scored double figures with 13 points. Junior Nordin Kapic led the Tritons with 8 assists and senior Hayden Gray led with 4 assists and 4 steals. Chris Howell, Milos Vicentic, Justin Rochelin and Maximo Milovich, as well as Kapic, all made their Triton debut, and all but Milovich scored in the game. Despite scoring 32.8% for field goals and 38.5% for three-pointers, the Tritons dropped to 0-1.

==== Pepperdine ====
The Tritons next played against the Pepperdine Waves at Liontree Arena. This game served as the home opener for UC San Diego. Five Tritons scored in double figures: Aniwaniwa Tait-Jones with 25 points, Tyler McGhie with 20 points, Hayden Gray with 14 points, Nordin Kapic with 13 points and Justin Rochelin with 11 points, a career high; all of which contributed to a 94–76 win over Pepperdine. Tait-Jones scored 9 for 11, while Hayden Gray made 5 steals and 7 assists. UC San Diego was able to open the gap in the first half by some scoring runs, large enough to not turn over the tables when Pepperdine started doing so in the second half, and the Tritons responded with another run to gain space and achieve the win. Ryder Elisaldez, Jasen Brooks and Yaqub Mir all made their first Triton appearances on the court. UC San Diego scored 49.2% for field goals and 42.1% beyond the arc. The win moved the Tritons up to 1–1.

==== Sacramento State ====
The Tritons continued their play at La Jolla, next facing the Sacramento State Hornets. Aniwaniwa Tait-Jones led with 21 points and 8 rebounds, Tyler McGhie added with 17 points, and Chris Howell set a career high in assists at a number of 7. The game stayed in the favor of the Tritons, who kept a lead in the entire game except for an early 4–4 tie, but Sacramento State made sure the gap wasn’t too large. They did attempt to decrease the gap, but that wasn’t enough as the Tritons won 64–54. Although the Tritons didn’t shoot ideally, it was sufficient to move them on to 2–1.

==== Seattle ====
Next, the Tritons faced off the Seattle Redhawks at Liontree Arena. The match didn’t work in the Tritons’ favor, with the Redhawks producing layups, jumpers and three-pointers to lead 30-12 with 12 minutes into the game. After finishing 28-49 in the first half, the Tritons managed to reduce the gap, coming within single digits on some occasions, but that wasn’t enough to win over the Redhawks, and the Tritons suffered their second loss of the season, dropping to 2-2. Three Tritons scored in double figures: Aniwaniwa Tait-Jones, Nordin Kapic and Tyler McGhie, all scoring at least 6 field goals and 1 free throw. Kapic scored a season high of 19 points.

==== La Salle ====
The Tritons then headed over to Daytona Beach, Florida to participate in the Boardwalk Battle. They were no strangers to Florida, having been upset by Chicago State last season in the College Basketball Invitational just at the Ocean Center. The first opponent in the tournament that the Tritons were facing was the La Salle Explorers, who was unbeaten so far in the season. The game opened strong for UC San Diego, and within five minutes, they led La Salle 17–3. But as the game progressed, the Explorers made its way back into the contention, and both teams went neck to neck in the remainder of the match, with neither team able to have a dominating lead. In the end, Tyler McGhie made two free throws that secured a 72–67 Triton win. McGhie was also the top scorer on the Tritons side, scoring 27 points and succeeding in all free throws awarded. Hayden Gray also scored double digits, but Nordin Kapic was the first Triton of the season to have a double-double — 18 points and 10 rebounds. The win moved the Tritons on to 3–2 on the season.

==== James Madison ====
In the Boardwalk Battle semifinals, the Tritons went head-to-head with the James Madison Dukes. The Dukes started off with a 7–2 run, but a three pointer from Nordin Kapic and a layup by Aniwaniwa Tait-Jones started a long phase where both teams stuck close to each other, with 4 lead changes and 6 tie scores. In the final seven minutes of play, the Tritons broke off from a 57–57 tie and proceeded to the finals with a 73–67 win. This win moved the Tritons to 4–2. Tait-Jones led the Tritons with 21 points, while Hayden Gray led the entire NCAA Division I with 23 steals.

==== Toledo ====
On November 23rd , the Tritons faced the Toledo Rockets at the Boardwalk Battle finals. After a back-and-forth first half with four ties and seven lead changes, the Tritons led 34–25 at the end. After halftime, the Tritons came back on a roll, knocking off with an 11–0 run, and after a Toledo timeout, brought out a 13–0 run. At that time, the gap was too large for the Rockets to launch themselves close enough to the Tritons, who won the championships with a 80–45 win. The Tritons set two records in this match: 45 points as the fewest points allowed to a D1 opponent, and 35 points as the largest margin of victory against a D1 opponent. Tritons shot 56.1% of their attempted field goals. Hayden Gray maintained his position as NCAA D1’s top stealer with 27 total steals, Tyler McGhie scored 27 points, including 7 three pointers, and was named the tournament MVP. Justin Rochelin set his career high with 8 rebounds.

==== La Verne ====
Heading back to La Jolla, the Tritons faced the La Verne Leopards after a week’s break. This is the first time this season the Tritons are playing against a non Division 1 opponent. The Tritons started off strong with an 18–0 run, and the gap only went up until a 50–8 halftime score. In the second half, bench Triton players had more minutes to play, and the Tritons finished with a 109–33 win, the lowest amount of points that UC San Diego has given up since moving up to NCAA Division I. All 12 active Triton players participated in the game and scored at least 4 points along with 2 rebounds each. Half of them scored in double figures: Tyler McGhie, Aniwaniwa Tait-Jones, Justin Rochelin, Aidan Burke, Ryder Elisaldez and Cade Pendleton. Justin Rochelin lead the team with 15 points, Hayden Gray added 4 more steals to his stats, while Aidan Burke scored four out of five beyond the arc.

=== Early conference games ===
==== UC Santa Barbara ====
On December 5th, the Tritons began their Big West Conference play against the UC Santa Barbara Gauchos at the Thunderdome. The lead went back and forth in the first half, until a three pointer by Tyler McGhie and a few field goals in the paint helped the Tritons manage a 10–1 run and secure a 42–33 half time lead. The Gauchos did make several attempts to close the gap, but the Tritons maintained their leading position in the entirety of the second half and ended strong with a 84–76 win. Throughout the game, the Tritons forced 18 turnovers while only making 7 themselves, proving their third-place national rank in turnover margin. Although UC San Diego shot only 25.8% beyond the arc, not their best percentage, 40 out of their 84 points scored was in the paint. Aniwaniwa Tait-Jones led with 22 points and 8 out of 9 free throws, Nordin Kapic followed with 19 points and scored in all of his free throw attempts. Hayden Gray added another 4 steals to his stats along with 13 points, and Justin Rochelin scored 11 points with 5 out of 6 free throws. Eight Triton players had time on the court, and each of them added at least three points to the scoreboard. The win moved the Tritons up to 7–2 on the season and 1-0 in conference play.

==== Cal State Bakersfield ====
The Tritons then returned home to LionTree on December 7 to play against the Cal State Bakersfield Roadrunners. The Roadrunners started off strong with a 6-2 run in the first five minutes, but then a layup from Maximo Milovich and a three pointer from Justin Rochelin helped the Tritons to get on track and deliver a 20-0 run. In the remainder of the game, despite some high-quality three pointers from the guest team, the Tritons made sure their lead never dropped to single digits, and for the final 13 minutes of the game, expanded it to be more than 20 points. UC San Diego scored 47.3% in field goals and 43% beyond the arc. At the same time, they led NCAA Division 1 in turnover margin of 8.6. Nordin Kapic led with a season high of 25 points, with 7 out of 8 three pointers scored, as well as three steals. Hayden Gray added 11 points and Chris Howell delivered 5 assists. The win moved the Tritons up to 8-2 in the season and 2-0 in conference play.

=== Remaining non-conference games ===
==== Idaho ====
After a pause for final exams, the Tritons began their three-game road trip at Moscow, Idaho against the Idaho Vandals. Despite 3 score ties and 5 lead changes in the earlier stages of the game, the Tritons took the lead with three minutes left in the first half, and dominated the field to produce a 80-56 win. Aniwaniwa Tait-Jones and Tyler McGhie scored 21 points each, with Tait-Jones scoring 8 out of 9 for field goals. Hayden Gray contributed 11 points and 5 steals, and Chris Howell scored in 8 out of 8 from the charity line. The Tritons overall shot 46.6% in field goals and 33.3% beyond the arc, and the win helped them move up to 9-2 in the season with a seven game winning streak, the longest so far since UC San Diego transitioned to NCAA Division 1.

==== Utah State ====
Next, the Tritons headed to Logan, Utah to fight against the Utah State Aggies, one of the toughest opponents the Tritons have faced so far in this season. The Aggies fans at the Dee Glen Smith Stadium were exceptionally passionate, but that didn’t stop Tyler McGhie and Nordin Kapic from giving the Tritons a head start, each scoring an early three pointer. The Aggies fought back, and both teams were neck-to-neck until Utah State rose in the final four minutes of the first half to gain a seven point lead, 39-32 ahead of the Tritons at halftime. The fight continued in the second half, with the Aggies maintaining their leading position while the Tritons tried to close the gap. It wasn’t until the final two minutes where Tyler McGhie hit a three-pointer that made the Tritons break away from a 64-64 tie, and despite scores from Mason Falslev and Karson Templin, it was two more free throws from the Tritons side that gained them their eight consecutive win of 75-73 and snapped Utah’s State unbeaten record so far in the season. McGhie was the top scorer from the Tritons’ side, scoring 26 points with a matched career high of three steals, while Aniwaniwa Tait-Jones added 20 points with 10 out of 12 free throws and 6 rebounds. Hayden Gray scored 15 points, Nordin Kapic made three steals, and Chris Howell delivered 6 assists. The Tritons overall made 23 free throws and 18 turnovers, both a season high.

==== San Diego ====
On December 21st, the Tritons headed back to San Diego, but still on a road trip as they visited the Toreros at Jenny Craig Pavilion. San Diego scored the first points of the game with a dunk, but Nordin Kapic responded with a layup and the Toreros never had the lead since then. It was a close match, with the Tritons’ lead being in single digits for most of the time and both teams tying at 28-28, but ultimately, the Tritons got the win, scoring 77-71. The Tritons overall delivered 20 steals, a Division I record for them, with Hayden Gray contributing a career high 7 steals, Kapic with 5 steals, and Chris Howell and Justin Rochelin each delivering 3 steals. Four players scored in double figures: Gray with 11 points, Howell with a career-high tie 11 points, Aniwaniwa Tait-Jones with 17 points and 7 for 7 from the charity line, and Tyler McGhie with a 27 points tying his season high as well as a career high seven three pointers. UC San Diego overall shot 46.2% for field goals and 40% for three pointers. The win over the Toreros moved Tritons on to a nine-game winning streak and 11-2 in the season.

==== Occidental ====
The Tritons’ final non-conference game was held back home at LionTree arena, facing the Occidental Tigers. This was the second time the Tritons faced an NCAA Division III opponent. In the entire game, the game favored the Tritons, and by the end of half-time, they were already leading 59-26, tying the largest amount of points the Tritons have scored in a half since the transition to NCAA D1. More Triton players had their chance to shine on the field in the bottom half, with the gap gradually increasing until a layup by Cade Pendleton set the final score to be a large win for the Tritons, 109-51. UC San Diego attempted 58 three-pointers in the game, a new program record, with Tyler McGhie having a career high of 8 three pointers made. Redshirt freshman Jasen Brooks set a career high of 14 points and 3 three pointers made. Besides McGhie and Brooks, Aniwaniwa Tait-Jones, Nordin Kapic, Hayden Gray, Aidan Burke and Justin Rochelin all scored double digits. Maximo Milovich led the Tritons with 10 rebounds and six assists, while Chris Howell added four more steals to his stats. The final match in 2024 moved the Tritons up to 12-2 in the season and continued their winning streak to ten games.

=== Remaining conference games ===
==== Cal State Fullerton ====
After the new year, Big West conference play resumed, and the Tritons headed up to Orange County, California to face off the Cal State Fullerton Titans. After a 10-2 run by the Tritons, the Titans made it close back to 16-12. However, a pair of free throws by Aniwaniwa Tait-Jones and a three pointer by Tyler McGhie started a Triton 11-0 run. Another 9-0 scoring run in the final two minutes in the first half made the Tritons lead the Titans 46-23, the first time this season where they led the opposing team by double digits at halftime while playing guests. In the second half, UC San Diego came out strong with a 15-0 run, keeping the home team scoreless for the first seven minutes of the second half. Shooting 52.5% in field goals, the Tritons won 90-51, with the largest ever scoring margin they ever produced in a Big West game. Tait-Jones led the Tritons with 24 points and 8-8 at the charity line, McGhie was only one point behind Tait-Jones with 23. Chris Howell proved his versatility on the field, scoring in every field goal and free throw attempted, as well as 4 rebounds, 1 assist, 2 blocks and 1 steal. The win moved UC San Diego on to 13-2 in the season and 3-0 in conference play.

==== Cal Poly ====
On January 9, the Tritons headed back home to face the Cal Poly Mustangs. Both teams came out hot and scored runs, shooting over 40% in field goals. However, the Tritons struggled in three-point shooting, and trailed behind 38-42 at the end of the first half. After the second half, UC San Diego came back on top and started a 19-4 run and gained them total dominance over the court. The gap gradually became too large for the Mustangs to overcome, and the Tritons gained their twelfth consecutive win with 95-68, scoring 57-26 in the second half. Overall, Tritons shot 55.2% in field goals, 92.0% in free throws and 33.3% in three pointers, with Aniwaniwa Tait-Jones leading the field with 25 points with 13 out of 14 free throws attempted. Hayden Gray scored a season high with 21 points, including 8 field goals, and added 6 more to his NCAA leading total number of steals. Nordin Kapic and Tyler McGhie also scored double figures, 16 points and 11 points respectively. Kapic also led the Tritons in rebounds by a number of 8, while Maximo Milovich made 6 rebounds. The win moved the Tritons on to 14-2 in the season and 4-0 in conference play.

==== UC Irvine ====
On January 11th, the Tritons played host to the UC Irvine Anteaters at a fully packed Liontree Arena with fans waiting in line three hours before tipoff. This was the first Triton home game to be nationally televised, with both teams battling out the possession for first place standing. The game started with both teams neck-to-neck with three lead changes, with the Tritons leading 20-16 ten minutes in before the Anteaters spurred a 14-2 run to make it 22-30. Numerous players on the Tritons side scored in an attempt to close the gap, and a three pointer from Aidan Burke 3 seconds before the end of the top half that cut the gap and made UC San Diego 32-34 behind UC Irvine at halftime. Anteater guard Myles Che scored a three pointer early in the second half, but a field goal by Hayden Gray and three pointers from Nordin Kapic and Chris Howell put the Tritons on top 40-38 with 13 minutes left to play. The Tritons maintained this lead until Anteater center Bent Leuchten delivered a layup and a free throw to tie the score 46-46. He then led the Anteaters to gain momentum and left the Tritons scoreless for almost three minutes by defense. Aniwaniwa Tait-Jones scored a pair of free throws near the end of the game, but that proved futile as the Tritons saw their twelve game winning streak come to an end with a 52-60 loss against the Anteaters and a season-low offensive output. The Tritons did not have a good shooting night, scoring 31.1% of their field goal attempts and only 17.1% beyond the arc. Nevertheless, Howell matched his career high with 11 points and 3 three pointers, while Tait-Jones was the top scorer with 17 points and Kapic grabbed hold of 9 rebounds. Howell also set a career high of 4 steals. The loss dropped the Tritons to 14-3 in the season and 4-1 in conference play.

==== Long Beach State ====
The NET ranked 53rd Tritons then hit the road to face off Long Beach State at the Gold Mine. After Beach guard Devin Askew hit the first four points of the game, the Tritons rallied back with a 12-2 run, with Justin Rochelin scoring seven straight with two field goals and a three pointer. Another 14-2 run increased the gap and made the Tritons lead 38-23 at the end of the first half. The Tritons shot more than the Beach in the second half, with a three pointer by Jasen Brooks assisted by Ryder Elisaldez which set the final score at 80-54. Tyler McGhie led the scoreboard with 26 points and 5 rebounds, while Aniwaniwa Tait-Jones added 18 points scoring six out of eight tries and Rochelin scored 11. Hayden Gray grabbed four steals and a pair of assists. The Tritons shot 57.7% for field goals and 47.4% beyond the arc, moving them on to 15-3 in the season and 5-1 in conference play. Their winning margin of 18.8 leads the Big West.

==== UC Riverside ====
The Tritons then headed on to Riverside to face the UC Riverside Highlanders. The Highlanders started off strong, scoring 5-0 in the first two minutes. The Tritons then began a long path to gain the lead, nearly doing so tying 65-65 with 8 minutes left in the second half. However, Highlander guard Barrington Hargress scored an 8-0 run in the subsequent two minutes, which the Tritons weren’t able to fight their way back as they eventually lost to the Highlanders 81-85. UC Riverside player Hargress had an exceptional night, scoring 40 points in total, while Triton player Aniwaniwa Tait-Jones scored a season high of 32 with 14 from 17 at the charity line as well with 7 rebounds. Hayden Gray shot 13 points with 3 for 5 beyond the arc, while Justin Rochelin added 10 points to the final score. Chris Howell scored 11 with 6 for 6 in free throws, and made a career high with 6 steals. Although the Tritons shot 40% in field goals and 82.1% in free throws, three point shooting percentage was only 21.4%. The loss dropped the Tritons to 15-4 in the season and 5-2 in conference play.

==== UC Santa Barbara ====
On January 23rd, the Tritons headed back to Liontree to face off the Gauchos the second time in conference regular season, this time in front of a spirit night crowd of over 3400. UC Santa Barbara gained an early start with an 11-4 run, until a jumper by Tyler McGhie and a three-pointer by Hayden Gray started an exhilarating 20-3 run to make the score 24-14 with four minutes left in the first half. The Tritons maintained this leading position into the second half, and despite a Gaucho comeback attempt in the final few minutes, won the match 77-63, finishing their regular season matchup against UC Santa Barbara with two wins. Aniwaniwa Tait-Jones led the Tritons with 25 points and 9-12 for field goals, while Gray scored 15 points with 3-5 beyond the arc. Nordin Kapic scored 12 points with 8 rebounds, and McGhie scored 11 points with 7 rebounds. The win moved the Tritons to 16-4 in the season and 6-2 in conference play.

==== Cal State Northridge ====
The Tritons continued to play home, this time against the Cal State Northridge Matadors. The Tritons started off strong, with Aniwaniwa Tait-Jones and Chris Howell joining forces to score 11-5 against CSUN in the first four minutes. Soon after, Tyler McGhie scored two three pointers and a layup to increase the gap to 26-12. A layup by Maximo Milovich and six minutes of scoring by Tait-Jones made the Tritons lead the Matadors 41-22 at halftime, with Tait-Jones scoring 23 points in the first half. In the bottom half, the Matadors attempted to make a comeback, but the Tritons made sure that they still had the lead and won over the Matadors 79-54. Tait-Jones scored 32 points in total, making him the second Triton athlete to score more than 30 twice a season. He made 10 out of 14 for field goals and 12 out of 13 for free throws. McGhie racked up 19 points, including 5 three pointers, and succeeded in 5 steals and 7 rebounds. Milovich made it 2 out of 2 for field goals, while Chris Howell delivered 8 assists. The win moved the Tritons up to 17-4 in the season and 7-2 in conference play.

==== Hawai’i ====
The Tritons then flew to the Hawaiian islands to face the Hawaii Rainbow Warriors. Nordin Kapic scored the first three points with a layup and a free throw, but the Rainbow Warriors took the lead six minutes into the game, and maintained that throughout the first half, leading the Tritons 34-33 at halftime with the largest gap ever achieved being 13. In the bottom half, the Tritons fought to close the gap, and successfully did so with 12 minutes to go at 47-47 by a dunk by Hayden Gray. A three pointer by both sides made the score tie at 50, but then a layup and a three pointer by Tyler Mcghie started a 10-0 run by the Tritons, who maintained the lead until the shot clock expired, setting the final score to be 74-63, and producing the largest winning margin the Tritons ever had over the Rainbow Warriors. McGhie led the Tritons with 24 points, while Aniwaniwa Tait-Jones added 16 more points and 9 rebounds. Gray and Kapic also scored in double digits, with 13 points and 11 points respectively, while Chris Howell tied his career high with 6 steals. The Tritons shot 48.0% in field goals and 42.1% in three pointers, and moved up to 18-4 in the season and 8-2 in conference play.

==== UC Riverside ====
Ranking 51st in NCAA Division I, the Tritons began their second half of their Big West conference play hosting the UC Riverside Highlanders. The Highlanders took the lead in the majority of the first half, and after multiple score ties and lead changes, Aniwaniwa Tait-Jones produced a layup and a free throw to make the Tritons lead 46-44 at halftime. An early Highlander jumper in the second half made the score tie again at 46-46, and then Tyler McGhie shot a jumper and a three pointer to bring the Tritons back on top, to which the Highlanders were unable to respond to the gap. Justin Rochelin shot five straight with a three pointer and a dunk, while McGhie closed out the final score to 91-71 with two more three pointers. Five Triton players finished in double figures: Tait-Jones leading the field with 28 points including 9 field goals and 7 rebounds, McGhie with 19 points with 8 field goals, Hayden Gray with 13 points, Nordin Kapic with 11 points and Justin Rochelin with 10. Gray also matched his career high in steals, at a total of 7. UC San Diego overall shot 48.6% in field goals, 41.4% in three pointers and 91.7% from the free throw line, and moved on to 19-4 in the season and 9-2 in conference play.

==== UC Irvine ====
The Tritons then headed to Irvine to play against the Anteaters at a fully packed Bren Events Center. Nonetheless, the atmosphere wasn’t completely against the Tritons. KSDT Sports, the UC San Diego student broadcasting organization which was covering multiple sports, including every single basketball home game and select away games, organized the project “Operation Invade Irvine”, where under their organization, nearly 300 UC San Diego students made the drive to cheer on the Tritons at the away court. As they cheered on, the Tritons gained the upper hand fairly quickly, with a layup by Aniwaniwa Tait-Jones and three consecutive three pointers by Chris Howell to make the Tritons lead 11-5 in little more than three minutes into the game. Both teams then took turns scoring and tension heated, until Anteater guard Justin Hohn produced a three pointer which made UC Irvine lead 23-22. Justin Rochelin responded with a dunk to bring the Tritons back in the lead. After tying at 26 and 28, a tip by Bent Leuchten sent Irvine at the lead 30-28, to which Rochelin produced another dunk which sent out deafening cheers from the Triton fans. Maximo Milovich made a layup which made the Tritons lead 32-30 at halftime. The second half started both teams scoring neck by neck, until another tie occurred with 14 minutes to go, 46-46. The Tritons then made a 21-4 run, with three pointers and layups raining down the basket to bring the score to 67-50. Throughout that part of the second half, UC San Diego scored 8 out of 9 three pointer attempts. Despite the Anteaters making the margin back to single digits 70-61, Tait-Jones took the reins and scored two three pointers and two pairs of free throws to help the Tritons secure the win. Anteater fans started heading towards the exits with two minutes left in the game. Operation Invade Irvine proved to be a huge success, with the Tritons dominating the Anteaters 85-67, snapping their 22 home game winning streak. UC San Diego shot above 50% for both field goals and three pointers. Eight Triton players shined on the field, scoring at least three points each and combining a total of 16 three pointers made. Tait-Jones led the Tritons with 22 points, while Howell made his career high of 15 points and 5 three pointers. Kapic and Hayden Gray also scored double digits, 15 and 12 points each. Aidan Burke did not miss a single shot, all of which beyond the arc. The win moved the Tritons on to 20-4 in the season and 10-2 in conference play, as well as tying in first place with UC Irvine in Big West Conference standings.

==== Cal State Bakersfield ====
The Tritons continued their road play, visiting the Cal State Bakersfield Roadrunners. Early on, Aniwaniwa Tait-Jones scored a three pointer and a pair of free throws, which marked his 2000th career point. The Roadrunners refused to give in, occasionally gaining the lead in the first few minutes of the game, but three three pointers from the Tritons’ side made their winning margin go up to double digits and remained so throughout the game, with UC San Diego winning 73-54 and clinching their ticket to the 2025 Big West Tournament. Tait-Jones shot 3 for 3 beyond the arc and led the scoreboard with 20 points, while Hayden Gray shot 3 for 4 in three pointers and scored 12 points. Cade Pendleton made his career high of 12 points with 4 three pointers made, and Tyler McGhie scored 10 points. Overall, the Tritons shot 50% in field goals and three pointers. The win moved them on to 21-4 in the season and 11-2 in conference play.

==== UC Davis ====
On February 15, the Tritons returned home to face the UC Davis Aggies. Throughout the game, the Tritons dominated the court, leading the Aggies 52-31 by halftime. In the second half, UC Davis started a 6-0 run, but two consecutive three pointers by Tyler McGhie made sure the gap stayed above 20 points for the remaining 14 minutes of the game and won the match 85-60. McGhie led the Tritons in 22 points scored with 4 three pointers, while Aniwaniwa Tait-Jones scored 16 points with 6 rebounds and 6 assists. Hayden Gray made 13 points and 4 steals, and Maximo Milovich added 6 rebounds. Overall, the Tritons shot 51.7% in field goals and 42.9% in three pointers. The win moved them on to 22-4 in the season and 12-2 in conference play, creating a new Triton record for wins in a Division I season.

==== Cal Poly ====
The Tritons then headed up to San Luis Obispo to once again match up against the Cal Poly Mustangs. After the home team scored the first three points of a game, the Tritons went on a 12-0 run, including double three-pointers by Tyler McGhie, making the score 12-3. Cal Poly then fought back to tie the score at 15 and 24, before leading the Tritons 31-28 with 4 minutes left in the first half, to which a dunk from Justin Rochelin made the gap close to one. Later, a 10-0 Triton run made them lead the Mustangs 42-34 at halftime. After the break, the Tritons spurred a 8-0 run before the Mustangs started scoring, but the Tritons maintained the lead in double digits and won 81-67. Although UC San Diego didn’t shoot ideally in three pointers, four Triton players scored double digits, with Aniwaniwa Tait-Jones scoring a double-double of 19 points and 10 rebounds, while McGhie scored 17 points, Hayden Gray scoring 14 points and Rochelin scoring 14 as well. Every Triton player who appeared on court scored at least 2 points. The win moved the Tritons on to 23-4 in the season and 13-2 in conference play, and with UC Irvine losing to Cal State Northridge, UC San Diego gained sole possession of first place standings in the Big West.

==== Hawaii ====
Heading back home, the Tritons played against the Rainbow Warriors once again. Ten minutes into the game, the Tritons were attacking efficiently with a 22-2 run and scoring nearly every shot attempted to make the score 28-7. They later spurred an 8-0 run to make the halftime score 42-17, the fewest points the Tritons have ever allowed a Big West opponent to score in the top half. A total of 9 three pointers were made by the Tritons. In the bottom half, the Tritons slightly dropped in scoring, but the gap between the two teams was still increasing, and UC San Diego dominated the match 83-44. Maximo Milovich scored the final layup of the game, in which he achieved his 1000 career point mark through an early three-pointer. He also led the Tritons with 6 rebounds. Aniwaniwa Tait-Jones led the board with 19 points, and accumulated to his 1000th career point as a Triton. Tyler McGhie followed with 17 points and Nordin Kapic added 13. Justin Rochelin shot 2 for 2 beyond the arc, while Hayden Gray added 3 more steals to his nation-leading total. The win moved the Tritons on to 24-4 in the season and 14-2 in the conference.

==== Cal State Northridge ====
Seeking a 10-game winning streak, the Tritons hit the road to face the Matadors the second time. Both teams went directly neck to neck with two score ties and three lead changes, until a double layup by Aniwaniwa Tait-Jones and a three pointer by Aidan Burke put the Tritons on top at 18-12 and made sure that they wouldn’t lose the leading possession. In the early stages of the second half, the Matadors cut the gap within 1, 37-36, but the Tritons were able to pull open the gap, and Nordin Kapic delivered a layup and a pair of free throws to set the final score to be 77-71. Tait-Jones once again led the Tritons with 20 points and 7 rebounds, while Kapic scored 15, Hayden Gray scored 12 and McGhie added 12 to the scoreboard. Overall, the Tritons shot above 40% in both field goal and three pointer attempts. Five Tritons produced two steals each: Tait-Jones, Gray, McGhie, Chris Howell and Justin Rochelin. The win moved the Tritons on to 25-4 in the season and 15-2 in conference play.

==== Cal State Fullerton ====
Now having secured a semifinal position with two byes in the Big West Conference play, the Tritons headed back home for their second to last home game against the Cal State Fullerton Titans. Four and a half minutes into the game, the Tritons were leading Titans 12-0, forcing a Titan timeout. However, the gap still gradually increased, with UC San Diego producing a 14-0 run to end the first half, leading the Titans 49-17. At the other end of the halftime break, Aniwaniwa Tait-Jones scored 5 points and Tyler McGhie buried a three pointer, giving the Tritons a 8-0 run. The Tritons then increased its rotation with bench players, until the final buzzer set the score at 100-55, the largest winning margin the Tritons ever had over a Big West opponent. A total of 11 Triton players stepped on the court, all of which scored at least 2 points and grabbed at least 1 rebound. Four Tritons scored double figures, with Tait-Jones and McGhie leading with 21 and 13 respectively, Hayden Gray with 11 and his 100th steal of the season, and Justin Rochelin with 11 and matching his career high of three 3-pointers made. Chris Howell made 5 assists and Tait-Jones made 3 steals. The win moved the Tritons on to 26-4 in the season and 16-2 in conference play.

==== Long Beach State ====
The Tritons hosted Long Beach State at their final home game, as well as honoring its graduating class: Hayden Gray, Aniwaniwa Tait-Jones, Tyler McGhie and Maximo Milovich. The game progressed quite slowly, with neither team able to put a substantial lead, and the first half ended with the Tritons leading 33-23. Early into the second half, the Tritons spurred a 10-0 run to increase the lead to 45-27, but Long Beach State managed to fight back and shorten the gap to single digits, until a block by Chris Howell snapped their momentum. Tait-Jones and McGhie closed out the game with layups and free throws to set the score at 70-63. Although that wasn’t the Tritons’ best performance on the court, it was enough to crown them the Big West Tournament regular season champions, which the team celebrated by cutting the net, with nearly 3000 fans joining them on the court by invitation of head coach Eric Olen. The Tritons moved on to 27-4 in the season and 17-2 in the conference.

==== UC Davis ====
On March 8, the Tritons headed up to Yolo County for their final regular season matchup against the UC Davis Aggies. Two three-pointers and three free throws by Tyler McGhie and a layup by Aniwaniwa Tait-Jones made the Tritons take an early 11-3 lead. The Aggies cut it close to 17-15 with 8 minutes to go in the first half. Justin Rochelin helped increase the lead with another classic dunk and a three pointer, and a three pointer by Nordin Kapic made the gap go up to double digits, 34-22 by the end of the first half. UC San Diego continued to shoot well in the bottom half, including a 7-0 run to bring the lead to over 20 points. UC Davis was able to gain momentum and decrease the gap, but the Tritons won the Big West regular season title outright with a 68-57 win. McGhie scored 18 points with 5 three pointers, tying the UC San Diego record for most three pointers scored in a single season. Kapic and Tait-Jones also scored double figures, 19 and 15 points respectively. The win concluded the UC San Diego men’s basketball regular season with 28-4 in the season and 18-2 in conference play.

== Postseason ==
=== Big West Tournament ===
As the No.1 seed in the Big West tournament, the Tritons earned a double bye to the semifinals.

==== UC Santa Barbara ====
On March 14, UC san Diego began their first Big West Tournament matchup, where they would play against Number 5 seed UC Santa Barbara at Lee's Family Forum in Henderson, Nevada. Hayden Gray scored beyond the arc to get things going, and despite the Tritons initially not shooting ideal from the charity line, they were able to gain a 7-2 lead by the first media timeout. The Gauchos attempted to get in the lead multiple times, but a jumper by Nordin Kapic and a three pointer by Aidan Burke increased the gap until both teams tied 19-19. Gaucho player Stephan Swenson made Santa Barbara take the lead, and the Gauchos maintained that until halftime, 27-26. Four minutes into the second half, UC San Diego still trailed behind by 1, until McGhie scored a three pointer and a pair of free throws that initiated a 15-0 run that also included a dunk by Chris Howell, who had his birthday on the very same day, a jumper from Gray and a three pointer each from Burke and Kapic. The Gauchos were unable to make a comeback, and the Tritons increased the gap and won their first ever Big West tournament game 69-51. Aniwaniwa Tait-Jones led the Tritons with 20 points, 9 assists and 8 rebounds, while McGhie broke the Tritons’ single season three pointers made record and scored 13 points. Kapic and Gray also made double figures, 13 and 11 points each. Burke once again didn’t miss a single shot attempted. Overall, UC San Diego didn’t shoot ideally beyond the arc, but it was good enough to move them to the championship game. The win put them at 29-4 in the season.

==== UC Irvine ====
In the championship game, the Tritons faced the UC Irvine Anteaters a third time to battle it out for the automatic bid for March Madness. The match started quite slow, with Hayden Gray making the first points with a three pointer two and a half minutes into the game. A jumper by Aniwaniwa Tait-Jones and another shot beyond the arc by Nordin Kapic made the Tritons go to an early 8-2 lead, but UC Irvine later used a 11-1 run to come back on top, to which Aidan Burke responded with another three pointer. A layup by Anteater center Bent Leuchten and a three pointer by Anteater guard Myles Che gave UC Irvine their largest lead of the game, 25-16, which forced a Triton timeout. Gray then delivered 5 points in a row to cut the gap in half, and the first half ended with the Tritons 31-33 behind the Anteaters. In the second half, Tait-Jones made a layup that tied the score and UC San Diego went on a 10-0 run to come back on top, 43-36. UC Irvine fought back furiously, but a dunk and a layup from Justin Rochelin, as well as a second three pointer from Burke made the Tritons still maintain their lead. UC Irvine fought back to 3 points twice, but it took two three pointers produced by Kapic and Tyler McGhie to increase the gap to double digits, to which the Anteaters were unable to fight back. Chris Howell ended the game with a dunk and a pair of free throws to settle the score at 75-61. Gray was the leading scorer for the Tritons, making six out of seven attempts beyond the arc with a personal best of 22 points, and made the all-tournament team. Tait-Jones made 14 points, 8 rebounds and 8 assists, and was named the Most Valuable Player. McGhie came with 11 points and 4-4 at the charity line, while Nordin Kapic scored 10 points with 7 rebounds. Howell tied with Gray with 3 steals. The Tritons received the automatic bid to March Madness, and with the women’s basketball team beating UC Davis in the finals, UC San Diego became the first school to ever send both their men’s and women’s basketball teams to the NCAA tournament in their first year of eligibility. Fans celebrated as the team cut down the net a second time and created history. The Tritons moved on to 30-4 in the season.

=== NCAA Tournament ===
On March 16, UC San Diego received an automatic bid to the NCAA Tournament as the No.12 seed in the South Region. It was their first ever NCAA Tournament appearance as a Division I team.

==== Michigan ====
On March 20, the Tritons faced the No.14 ranked Michigan Wolverines at Denver, Colorado. The Ball Arena had a sellout crowd of 19302, the largest crowd to ever watch a UC San Diego sports event in person. The game did not start the Tritons’ way as Michigan was fast with four players combining for a 10-0 lead four minutes into the game, before Tyler McGhie made a jumper to score the first points for the Tritons. Aniwaniwa Tait-Jones and Nordin Kapic each added a field goal, and Justin Rochelin made a dunk, to which Michigan responded with a 7-0 run. UC San Diego was missing many of their field goal attempts, and their deficit behind the Wolverines kept bobbing around the 10 point mark. Michigan players such as Danny Wolf and Vladislav Goldin challenged the Tritons on the court, with Goldin ending the first half with a layup and a free throw to put Michigan 41-27 against UC San Diego. Kapic returned the favor early on in the second half and started a 17-4 Triton run to bring the gap close to 1, 44-45. Michigan responded with a 14-5 run, before Kapic sank a pair of free throws and Gray hit a three pointer to maintain UC San Diego’s chances of winning the game. With four minutes left in the game, McGhie made a jumper and a three pointer to tie the score at 63-63, before making another jumper to give the Tritons their first lead of the game. However, Michigan athlete Tre Donaldson put Michigan in the lead with a three pointer and Goldin scored two more free throws to put the score at 68-65. McGhie got hold of the final possession and shot a three pointer in an attempt to bring the game to overtime. However, the ball hit the back of the rim and Michigan hung on to a 68-65 win. Despite missing that heartbreaking goal, McGhie scored 25 points and set his career high of nine rebounds, as well as a Triton record of 117 three pointers made in a single season. Kapic followed closely with 8 rebounds and 15 points, while Gray scored 10 points and Howell led with 3 steals. Although the Tritons put up a gallant fight, the loss ended their nation-leading fifteen game winning streak as well as their season with a 30-5 record.

== Schedule and results ==
Date time, TV	Rank^{#}	Opponent^{#}	Result	Record	High points	High rebounds	High assists	Site (attendance) city, state
Regular season
November 6, 2024*; 7:00 pm, YurView		at San Diego State	L 58–63	0−1	21 – McGhie	8 – Kapic	4 – Gray	Viejas Arena (12,414); San Diego, CA
November 9, 2024*; 7:00 pm, ESPN+		Pepperdine	W 94–76	1–1	25 – Tait-Jones	5 – Tied	7 – Gray	LionTree Arena (3,688); La Jolla, CA
November 12, 2024*; 7:00 pm, ESPN+		Sacramento State	W 64–54	2–1	21 – Tait-Jones	8 – Tait-Jones	6 – Howell	LionTree Arena (1,031); La Jolla, CA
November 16, 2024*; 7:00 pm, ESPN+		Seattle	L 71–84	2–2	20 – Tait-Jones	4 – Tied	4 – Gray	LionTree Arena (1,206); La Jolla, CA
November 21, 2024*; 10:00 am, BallerTV		vs. La Salle; Boardwalk Battle Quarterfinal	W 72–67	3–2	27 – McGhie	10 – Kapic	2 – Tied	Ocean Center; Daytona Beach, FL
November 22, 2024*; 12:30 pm, BallerTV		vs. James Madison; Boardwalk Battle Semifinal	W 73–67	4–2	21 – Tait-Jones	6 – Tait-Jones	4 – Tait-Jones	Ocean Center; Daytona Beach, FL
November 23, 2024*; 2:30 pm, BallerTV		vs. Toledo; Boardwalk Battle Final	W 80–45	5–2	27 – McGhie	8 – Rochelin	4 – McGhie	Ocean Center; Daytona Beach, FL
November 30, 2024*; 4:00 pm, ESPN+		La Verne	W 109–33	6–2	15 – Rochelin	7 – Tied	6 – Brooks	LionTree Arena (792); La Jolla, CA
December 5, 2024; 7:00 pm, ESPN+		at UC Santa Barbara	W 84–76	7–2 (1–0)	22 – Tait-Jones	8 – Gray	3 – Tied	The Thunderdome (2,065); Santa Barbara, CA
December 7, 2024; 7:00 pm, ESPN+		Cal State Bakersfield	W 81–60	8–2 (2–0)	25 – Kapic	7 – Tait-Jones	5 – Howell	LionTree Arena (1,862); La Jolla, CA
December 15, 2024*; 4:00 pm, ESPN+		at Idaho	W 80–56	9–2	21 – Tied	10 – Kapic	3 – Gray	ICCU Arena (1,410); Moscow, ID
December 17, 2024*; 6:00 pm, MW Network		at Utah State	W 75–73	10–2	26 – McGhie	6 – Tied	6 – Howell	Smith Spectrum (7,354); Logan, UT
December 21, 2024*; 7:00 pm, ESPN+		at San Diego	W 77–71	11–2	27 – McGhie	7 – Kapic	6 – Tait-Jones	Jenny Craig Pavilion (1,350); San Diego, CA
December 28, 2024*; 4:00 pm, ESPN+		Occidental	W 109–51	12–2	24 – McGhie	10 – Milovich	6 – Milovich	LionTree Arena (1,172); La Jolla, CA
January 4, 2024; 6:00 pm, ESPN+		at Cal State Fullerton	W 90–51	13–2 (3–0)	24 – Tait-Jones	5 – Tied	4 – Tied	Titan Gym (521); Fullerton, CA
January 9, 2025; 7:00 pm, ESPN+		Cal Poly	W 95–68	14–2 (4–0)	25 – Tait-Jones	8 – Kapic	4 – Tied	LionTree Arena (1,522); La Jolla, CA
January 11, 2025; 7:00 pm, ESPNU		UC Irvine	L 52–60	14–3 (4–1)	17 – Tait-Jones	9 – Kapic	4 – Howell	LionTree Arena (4,000); La Jolla, CA
January 16, 2025; 7:00 pm, ESPN+		at Long Beach State	W 80–54	15–3 (5–1)	26 – McGhie	5 – McGhie	2 – Tied	The Gold Mine (1,478); Long Beach, CA
January 18, 2025; 5:00 pm, ESPN+		at UC Riverside	L 81–85	15–4 (5–2)	32 – Tait-Jones	7 – Tait-Jones	4 – Tait-Jones	SRC Arena (1,537); Riverside, CA
January 23, 2025; 7:00 pm, ESPN+		UC Santa Barbara	W 77–63	16–4 (6–2)	25 – Tait-Jones	8 – Kapic	4 – Howell	LionTree Arena (3,442); La Jolla, CA
January 25, 2025; 7:00 pm, ESPN+		Cal State Northridge	W 79–54	17–4 (7–2)	32 – Tait-Jones	7 – McGhie	8 – Howell	LionTree Arena (1,584); La Jolla, CA
January 30, 2025; 9:00 pm, ESPN+		at Hawai'i	W 74–63	18–4 (8–2)	24 – McGhie	9 – Tait-Jones	3 – Howell	Stan Sheriff Center (4,218); Honolulu, HI
February 6, 2025; 7:00 pm, ESPN+		UC Riverside	W 91–71	19–4 (9–2)	28 – Tait-Jones	7 – Tait-Jones	5 – Gray	LionTree Arena (1,754); La Jolla, CA
February 8, 2025; 7:00 pm, ESPNU		at UC Irvine; Operation Invade Irvine	W 85–67	20–4 (10–2)	22 – Tait-Jones	8 – Tait-Jones	8 – Tied	Bren Events Center (5,000); Irvine, CA
February 13, 2025; 6:30 pm, ESPN+		at Cal State Bakersfield	W 73–54	21–4 (11–2)	20 – Tait-Jones	7 – Gray	4 – Tied	Icardo Center (876); Bakersfield, CA
February 15, 2025; 7:00 pm, ESPN+		UC Davis	W 85–60	22–4 (12–2)	22 – McGhie	6 – Tied	6 – Tait-Jones	LionTree Arena (2,003); La Jolla, CA
February 20, 2025; 7:00 pm, ESPN+		at Cal Poly	W 81–67	23–4 (13–2)	19 – Tait-Jones	10 – Tait-Jones	4 – Tied	Mott Athletics Center (1,568); San Luis Obispo, CA
February 22, 2025; 7:00 pm, ESPN+		Hawai'i	W 83–44	24–4 (14–2)	19 – Tait-Jones	6 – Milovich	5 – Gray	LionTree Arena (3,084); La Jolla, CA
February 27, 2025; 7:00 pm, ESPN+		at Cal State Northridge	W 77–71	25–4 (15–2)	20 – Tait-Jones	7 – Tait-Jones	5 – Gray	Premier America Credit Union Arena (2,098); Northridge, CA
March 1, 2025; 7:00 pm, ESPN+		Cal State Fullerton	W 100–55	26–4 (16–2)	21 – Tait-Jones	6 – Kapic	5 – Howell	LionTree Arena (2,019); La Jolla, CA
March 6, 2025; 7:00 pm, ESPN+		Long Beach State	W 70–63	27–4 (17–2)	20 – Tied	5 – Tied	6 – Howell	LionTree Arena (2,987); La Jolla, CA
March 8, 2025; 8:00 pm, ESPN2		at UC Davis	W 68–57	28–4 (18–2)	18 – McGhie	8 – Tait-Jones	6 – Gray	University Credit Union Center (4,281); Davis, CA
Big West tournament
March 14, 2025; 6:00 pm, ESPN+/ESPNU	(1)	vs. (5) UC Santa Barbara; Semifinals	W 69–51	29–4	20 – Tait-Jones	8 – Tait-Jones	9 – Tait-Jones	Lee's Family Forum; Henderson, NV
March 15, 2025; 6:40 pm, ESPN2	(1)	vs. (2) UC Irvine; Championship	W 75–61	30–4	22 – Gray	8 – Tait-Jones	8 – Tait-Jones	Lee's Family Forum (2,632); Henderson, NV
NCAA Tournament
March 20, 2025; 7:00 pm, TBS	(12 S)	vs. (5 S) No. 14 Michigan; First Round	L 65–68	30–5	25 – McGhie	9 – McGhie	3 – Tied	Ball Arena (19,302); Denver, CO
*Non-conference game. ^{#}Rankings from AP Poll. (#) Tournament seedings in parentheses. S=South. All times are in Pacific.

== Player statistics ==
Individual player statistics (final)
			Minutes		Scoring		Total FGs			3-point FGs			Free-Throws			Rebounds							
Player	GP	GS	Tot	Avg	Pts	Avg	FG	FGA	Pct	3FG	3FGA	Pct	FT	FTA	Pct	Off	Def	Tot	Avg	A	Stl	Blk	TO
Tait-Jones, Aniwaniwa	35	35	1036	29.6	670	19.1	216	375	.576	15	48	.313	223	297	.751	48	142	190	5.4	127	43	15	71
McGhie, Tyler	35	35	1068	30.5	582	16.6	198	477	.415	117	310	.377	69	80	.863	10	133	143	4.1	47	33	8	24
Gray, Hayden	35	35	1123	32.1	391	11.2	147	307	.479	64	153	.418	33	48	.688	25	85	110	3.1	116	110	8	47
Kapic, Nordin	34	33	853	25.1	364	10.7	115	295	.390	54	176	.307	80	107	.748	51	127	178	5.2	42	27	14	45
Rochelin, Justin	35	0	673	19.2	232	6.6	87	188	.463	36	106	.340	22	32	.688	24	98	122	3.5	26	24	11	29
Howell, Chris	35	35	1016	29.0	197	5.6	64	143	.448	21	64	.328	48	64	.750	37	97	134	3.8	104	76	9	38
Burke, Aidan	35	0	460	13.1	144	4.1	51	116	.440	39	97	.392	4	7	.571	14	30	44	1.3	19	13	1	9
Vicentic, Milos	1	0	20	20.0	3	3.0	1	6	.167	1	1	1.000	0	0	.000	1	4	5	5.0	0	0	0	1
Pendleton, Cade	20	0	107	5.4	54	2.7	19	42	.452	14	31	.452	2	2	1.000	7	12	19	1.0	4	3	1	3
Milovich, Maximo	33	2	441	13.4	76	2.3	32	53	.604	2	8	.250	10	20	0.500	33	59	92	2.8	25	6	6	11
Brooks, Jasen	18	0	78	4.3	38	2.1	14	35	.400	9	28	.321	1	1	1.000	4	11	15	0.8	8	4	1	1
Mir, Yaqub	3	0	17	5.7	6	2.0	2	5	.400	1	4	.250	1	2	0.500	0	2	2	0.7	2	2	0	0
Elisaldez, Ryder	20	0	108	5.4	20	1.0	8	16	.500	3	9	.333	1	2	0.500	6	7	13	0.7	16	4	0	3
Total	35		7000	200	2777	79.34	954	2058	.464	365	1035	.362	494	662	.746	319	871	1190	34.0	550	345	74	305
Opponents	35		7000	200	2163	61.80	743	1873	.397	273	828	.330	404	544	.743	329	875	1204	34.4	393	158	98	557

Legend
GP	Games played	GS	Games started	Avg	Average per game
FG	Field-goals made	FGA	Field-goal attempts	Off	Offensive rebounds
Def	Defensive rebounds	A	Assists	TO	Turnovers
Blk	Blocks	Stl	Steals	High	Team high
Generally, must have played in 27 (75%) of UC San Diego's games to be the leader in average or percentage categories.

== Game summaries ==
=== at San Diego State ===
YurView

November 6, 2024
7:00 p.m.

Recap

UC San Diego Tritons 58, San Diego State Aztecs 63
Scoring by half: 22–24, 36–39
Pts: Tyler McGhie, 21; Rebs: Nordin Kapic, 8 Asts: Hayden Gray, 4	Pts: Miles Byrd, 20; Rebs: Jared Coleman-Jones, 9 Asts: Nick Boyd, 4

Viejas Arena, San Diego, CA
Attendance: 12,414
Referees: Tommy Nunez, Randy Richardson, Michael Irving

=== vs Pepperdine ===
ESPN+

November 9, 2024
7:00 p.m.

Recap

Pepperdine Waves 76, UC San Diego Tritons 94
Scoring by half: 32–47, 44–47
Pts: Stefan Todorovic, 33; Rebs: Tied, 7 Asts: Moe Odum, 7	Pts: Aniwaniwa Tait-Jones, 25; Rebs: Tied, 5 Asts: Hayden Gray, 7

Liontree Arena, San Diego, CA
Attendance: 3,688
Referees: James Duke, Martin Cichocki, Christopher Merlo

=== vs Sacramento State ===
ESPN+

November 12, 2024
7:00 p.m.

Recap

Sacramento State Hornets 54, UC San Diego Tritons 64
Scoring by half: 24–35, 30–29
Pts: Alex Kovatchev, 14; Rebs: Tied, 7 Asts: Tied, 3	Pts: Aniwaniwa Tait-Jones, 17; Rebs: Aniwaniwa Tait-Jones, 8 Asts: Chris Howell, 7

Liontree Arena, San Diego, CA
Attendance: 1,031
Referees: Eric Curry, Kristyne Esparza, Frank Harvey III

=== vs Seattle ===
ESPN+

November 16, 2024
7:00 p.m.

Recap

Seattle Redhawks 84, UC San Diego Tritons 71
Scoring by half: 49–28, 35–43
Pts: Maleek Arington, 21; Rebs: Matthew-Alexander Moncrieffe, 13; Asts: Maleek Arington, 6	Pts: Aniwaniwa Tait-Jones, 20; Rebs: Tied, 4 Asts: Hayden Gray, 4

Liontree Arena, San Diego, CA
Attendance: 1,206
Referees: Grant Jeffres, Michael Kashirsky, DG Nelson

=== La Salle (Boardwalk Battle quarterfinal) ===
November 21, 2024
10:00 a.m.

Recap

La Salle Explorers 67, UC San Diego Tritons 72
Scoring by half: 31–30, 36–42
Pts: Corey McKeithan, 21; Rebs: Demetrius Lilley, 12; Asts: Tunde Vahlberg Fasasi, 3	Pts: Tyler McGhie, 27; Rebs: Nordin Kapic, 10; Asts: Tied, 2

Ocean Center, Daytona Beach, FL
Referees: Jim Googas, Jawaan Williams, Ron Tybo

=== James Madison (Boardwalk Battle semifinal) ===
November 22, 2024
12:30 p.m.

Recap

James Madison Dukes 67, UC San Diego Tritons 73
Scoring by half: 28–34, 39–39
Pts: Bryce Lindsay, 17; Rebs: AJ Smith, 9 Asts: Xavier Brown, 4	Pts: Aniwaniwa Tait-Jones, 21; Rebs: Aniwaniwa Tait-Jones, 6 Asts: Aniwaniwa Tait-Jones, 4

Ocean Center, Daytona Beach, FL
Referees: Mamadou Ba, Jawaan Williams, Scott Gooden

=== Toledo (Boardwalk Battle final) ===
November 23, 2024
2:30 p.m.

Recap

Toledo Rockets 45, UC San Diego Tritons 80
Scoring by half: 25–34, 20–46
Pts: Tied, 10; Rebs: Tied, 5 Asts: Sonny Wilson, 2	Pts: Tyler McGhie, 27; Rebs: Justin Rochelin, 8 Asts: Tyler McGhie, 4

Ocean Center, Daytona Beach, FL
Referees: Jawaan Williams, Anthony Eades, Mike Nardone

=== vs La Verne ===
ESPN+

November 30, 2024
4:00 p.m.

Recap

La Verne Leopards 33, UC San Diego Tritons 109
Scoring by half: 8–50, 25–59
Pts: Cody Aquino, 8 Rebs: Paul Antonis, 6 Asts: Tied, 1	Pts: Justin Rochelin, 15; Rebs: Tied, 7 Asts: Jasen Brooks, 6

Liontree Arena, San Diego, CA
Attendance: 792
Referees: Ray Natili, Marques Pettigrew, Michael Greenstein

=== at UC Santa Barbara ===
ESPN+

December 5, 2024
7:00 p.m.

Recap

UC San Diego Tritons 84, UC Santa Barbara Gauchos 76
Scoring by half: 42–33, 42–43
Pts: Aniwaniwa Tait-Jones, 22; Rebs: Hayden Gray, 8 Asts: Tied, 3	Pts: Stephan Swenson, 21; Rebs: Jason Fontenet II, 12; Asts: Stephan Swenson, 5

The Thunderdome, Santa Barbara, CA
Attendance: 2,065
Referees: Bill Vinovich, Rick Crawford, Michael Scyphers

=== vs Cal State Bakersfield ===
ESPN+

December 7, 2024
4:00 p.m.

Recap

Cal State Bakersfield Roadrunners 60, UC San Diego Tritons 81
Scoring by half: 30–51, 30–30
Pts: CJ Hardy, 11; Rebs: Corey Stephenson, 7 Asts: Tied, 2	Pts: Nordin Kapic, 25; Rebs: Aniwaniwa Tait-Jones, 7 Asts: Chris Howell, 5

Liontree Arena, San Diego, CA
Attendance: 1,862
Referees: Grant Jeffres, Pete Larson, Chad Shepherd

=== at Idaho ===
ESPN+

December 15, 2024
4:00 p.m.

Recap

UC San Diego Tritons 80, Idaho Vandals 56
Scoring by half: 39–31, 41–25
Pts: Tied, 21; Rebs: Nordin Kapic, 10; Asts: Hayden Gray, 3	Pts: Tyler Mrus, 20; Rebs: Evan Steele, 8 Asts: Kolton Mitchell, 3

Idaho Central Credit Union Arena, Moscow, ID
Attendance: 1,410
Referees: Frank Harvey III, Chance Moore, Bret Smith

=== at Utah State ===
December 17, 2024
7:00 p.m.

Recap

UC San Diego Tritons 75, Utah State Aggies 73
Scoring by half: 32–39, 43–34
Pts: Tyler McGhie, 26; Rebs: Tied, 6 Asts: Chris Howell, 6	Pts: Karson Templin, 18; Rebs: Mason Falslev, 9 Asts: Mason Falslev, 9

Smith Spectrum, Logan, UT
Attendance: 7,354
Referees: Ian Caldwell, Thomas Nunez, Michael Reed

=== at San Diego ===
December 21, 2024
6:00 p.m.

Recap

UC San Diego Tritons 77, San Diego Toreros 71
Scoring by half: 32–28, 45–43
Pts: Tyler McGhie, 27; Rebs: Nordin Kapic, 7 Asts: Aniwaniwa Tait-Jones, 6	Pts: Joey Chammaa, 14; Rebs: Santiago Trouet, 20; Asts: Tied, 3

Jenny Craig Pavilion, San Diego, CA
Attendance: 1,350
Referees: Jason Garretson, Gregory Nixon, Tony Padilla

=== vs Occidental ===
ESPN+

December 28, 2024
4:00 p.m.

Recap

Occidental Tigers 51, UC San Diego Tritons 109
Scoring by half: 26–59, 25–50
Pts: Nasir Luna, 17; Rebs: Henry Wilson, 6 Asts: Jacob Hamermesh, 4	Pts: Tyler McGhie, 24; Rebs: Maximo Milovich, 10; Asts: Maximo Milovich, 6

Liontree Arena, San Diego, CA
Attendance: 1,172
Referees: Wilson Holland, Frank Harvey III, Anitinio Petty

=== at Cal State Fullerton ===
ESPN+

January 4, 2025
6:00 p.m.

Recap

UC San Diego Tritons 90, Cal State Fullerton Titans 51
Scoring by half: 46–23, 44–28
Pts: Aniwaniwa Tait-Jones, 24; Rebs: Tied, 5 Asts: Tied, 4	Pts: Antwan Robinson, 12; Rebs: Kobe Young, 7 Asts: Kaleb Brown, 2

Titan Gym, Fullerton, CA
Attendance: 521
Referees: Tariq Lucas, Ervin Wilson, David Hall

=== vs Cal Poly ===
ESPN+

January 9, 2025
7:00 p.m.

Recap

Cal Poly Mustangs 68, UC San Diego Tritons 95
Scoring by half: 42–38, 26–57
Pts: Owen Koonce, 20; Rebs: Owen Koonce, 6 Asts: Jarred Hyder, 7	Pts: Aniwaniwa Tait-Jones, 25; Rebs: Nordin Kapic, 8 Asts: Tied, 4

Liontree Arena, San Diego, CA
Attendance: 1,522
Referees: James Ford, Tommy Johnson, Kelly Self

=== vs UC Irvine ===
ESPNU

January 11, 2025
7:00 p.m.

Recap

UC Irvine Anteaters 60, UC San Diego Tritons 52
Scoring by half: 34–32, 26–20
Pts: Bent Leuchten, 23; Rebs: Bent Leuchten, 13; Asts: Tied, 4	Pts: Aniwaniwa Tait-Jones, 17; Rebs: Nordin Kapic, 9 Asts: Chris Howell, 4

Liontree Arena, San Diego, CA
Attendance: 4,000
Referees: Johnny Harrington, Randal Anders, Martin Cichocki

=== at Long Beach State ===
January 16, 2025
7:00 p.m.

Recap

UC San Diego Tritons 80, Long Beach State Beach 54
Scoring by half: 38–23, 42–31
Pts: Tyler McGhie, 26; Rebs: Tyler McGhie, 5 Asts: Tied, 2	Pts: Varick Lewis, 12; Rebs: Derrick Michael Xzavierro, 6 Asts: Devin Askew, 5

The Gold Mine, Long Beach, CA
Attendance: 1,478
Referees: Bill Vinovich, Robert Felder, Ed Crenshaw

=== at UC Riverside ===
ESPN+

January 18, 2025
7:00 p.m.

Recap

UC San Diego Tritons 81, UC Riverside Highlanders 85
Scoring by half: 35–44, 46–41
Pts: Aniwaniwa Tait-Jones, 32; Rebs: Aniwaniwa Tait-Jones, 7 Asts: Aniwaniwa Tait-Jones, 4	Pts: Barrington Hargress, 40; Rebs: Joel Armotrading, 14; Asts: Isaiah Moses, 10

SRC Arena, Riverside, CA
Attendance: 1,537
Referees: Kristyne Esparza, Andy Cohn, Ervin Wilson

=== vs UC Santa Barbara ===
ESPN+

January 23, 2025
7:00 p.m.

Recap

UC Santa Barbara Gauchos 63, UC San Diego Tritons 77
Scoring by half: 31–44, 32–33
Pts: Deuce Turner, 16; Rebs: Kenny Pohto, 8 Asts: Deuce Turner, 3	Pts: Aniwaniwa Tait-Jones, 25; Rebs: Nordin Kapic, 8 Asts: Chris Howell, 4

Liontree Arena, San Diego, CA
Attendance: 3,442
Referees: Glen Mayberry, Jeffery Malham, Michael Greenstein

=== vs Cal State Northridge ===
ESPN+

January 23, 2025
7:00 p.m.

Recap

Cal State Northridge Matadors 54, UC San Diego Tritons 79
Scoring by half: 22–41, 32–38
Pts: Scotty Washington, 17; Rebs: Keonte Jones, 10; Asts: Tyler Beard, 5	Pts: Aniwaniwa Tait-Jones, 32; Rebs: Tyler McGhie, 7 Asts: Chris Howell, 8

Liontree Arena, San Diego, CA
Attendance: 1,584
Referees: Randal Anders, Wilson Holland, Mark Fulton

=== at Hawaii ===
ESPN+

January 30, 2025
7:00 p.m.

Recap

UC San Diego Tritons 74, Hawaii Rainbow Warriors 63
Scoring by half: 33–34, 41–29
Pts: Tyler McGhie, 24; Rebs: Aniwaniwa Tait-Jones, 9 Asts: Chris Howell, 3	Pts: Tied, 11; Rebs: Tanner Christensen, 7 Asts: Aaron Hunkin-Claytor, 4

Stan Sheriff Center, Honolulu, HI
Attendance: 4,218
Referees: Kirk Smith, DG Nelson, Michael Scyphers

=== vs UC Riverside ===
ESPN+

February 6, 2025
7:00 p.m.

Recap

UC Riverside Highlanders 71, UC San Diego Tritons 91
Scoring by half: 44–46, 27–45
Pts: Isaiah Moses, 25; Rebs: Joel Armotrading, 6 Asts: Nate Pickens, 4	Pts: Aniwaniwa Tait-Jones, 28; Rebs: Aniwaniwa Tait-Jones, 7 Asts: Hayden Gray, 5

Liontree Arena, San Diego, CA
Attendance: 1,754
Referees: Keith Patterson, Eric Curry, John Hampton

=== at UC Irvine ===
ESPNU

February 8, 2025
7:00 p.m.

Recap

UC San Diego Tritons 85, UC Irvine Anteaters 67
Scoring by half: 32–30, 53–37
Pts: Aniwaniwa Tait-Jones, 22; Rebs: Aniwaniwa Tait-Jones, 8 Asts: Tied, 8	Pts: Bent Leuchten, 23; Rebs: Devin Tillis, 9 Asts: Tied, 4

Bren Events Center, Irvine, CA
Attendance: 5,000
Referees: Jeffery Malham, Doug Sturdivan, Jeff Campbell

=== at Cal State Bakersfield ===
ESPN+

February 13, 2025
6:30 p.m.

Recap

UC San Diego Tritons 73, Cal State Bakersfield Roadrunners 54
Scoring by half: 31–19, 42–35
Pts: Aniwaniwa Tait-Jones, 20; Rebs: Hayden Gray, 7 Asts: Tied, 4	Pts: Jemel Jones, 29; Rebs: Tied, 8 Asts: Jemel Jones, 4

Icardo Center, Bakersfield, CA
Attendance: 876
Referees: Kirk Smith, Chance Moore, Bill Vinovich

=== vs UC Davis ===
ESPN+

February 15, 2025
7:00 p.m.

Recap

UC Davis Aggies 60, UC San Diego Tritons 85
Scoring by half: 31–52, 29–33
Pts: Ty Johnson, 14; Rebs: Nils Cooper, 8 Asts: Leo DeBruhl, 5	Pts: Tyler McGhie, 22; Rebs: Tied, 6 Asts: Aniwaniwa Tait-Jones, 6

Liontree Arena, San Diego, CA
Attendance: 2,003
Referees: Chris Hudson, Shane Staggs, Rick Bastell

=== at Cal Poly ===
ESPN+

February 20, 2025
7:00 p.m.

Recap

UC San Diego Tritons 81, Cal Poly Mustangs 67
Scoring by half: 42–34, 39–33
Pts: Aniwaniwa Tait-Jones, 19; Rebs: Aniwaniwa Tait-Jones, 10; Asts: Tied, 4	Pts: Cayden Ward, 17; Rebs: Cayden Ward, 9 Asts: Tied, 3

Mott Athletics Center, San Luis Obispo, CA
Attendance: 1,568
Referees: Casey McClellan, Levon Zakarian, Gregory Nixon

=== vs Hawaii ===
ESPN+

February 22, 2025
7:00 p.m.

Recap

Hawaii Rainbow Warriors 44, UC San Diego Tritons 83
Scoring by half: 17–42, 27–41
Pts: Ryan Rapp, 9 Rebs: Harry Rouhliadeff, 6 Asts: Aaron Hunkin-Claytor, 3	Pts: Aniwaniwa Tait-Jones, 19; Rebs: Maximo Milovich, 6 Asts: Hayden Gray, 5

Liontree Arena, San Diego, CA
Attendance: 3,084
Referees: John Jenkins, Toby Doolittle, Wilson Holland

=== at Cal State Northridge ===
ESPN+

February 27, 2025
7:00 p.m.

Recap

UC San Diego Tritons 77, Cal State Northridge Matadors 71
Scoring by half: 37–30, 40–41
Pts: Aniwaniwa Tait-Jones, 20; Rebs: Aniwaniwa Tait-Jones, 7 Asts: Hayden Gray, 5	Pts: Keonte Jones, 20; Rebs: Keonte Jones, 11; Asts: Tyler Beard, 6

Premier America Credit Union Arena, Northridge, CA
Attendance: 2,098
Referees: Jason Garretson, John Hampton, Bret Smith

=== vs Cal State Fullerton ===
ESPN+

March 1, 2025
7:00 p.m.

Recap

Cal State Fullerton Titans 55, UC San Diego Tritons 100
Scoring by half: 17–49, 38–51
Pts: Antwan Robinson, 13; Rebs: Antwan Robinson, 10; Asts: Tied, 3	Pts: Aniwaniwa Tait-Jones, 21; Rebs: Nordin Kapic, 6 Asts: Chris Howell, 5

Liontree Arena, San Diego, CA
Attendance: 2,019
Referees: Matthew Rusakin, Frank Harvey III, Michael Scyphers

=== vs Long Beach State ===
ESPN+

March 6, 2025
7:00 p.m.

Recap

Long Beach State Beach 63, UC San Diego Tritons 70
Scoring by half: 23–33, 40–37
Pts: Devin Askew, 29; Rebs: Austin Johnson, 12; Asts: Jason Hart Jr., 3	Pts: Tied, 20; Rebs: Tied, 5 Asts: Chris Howell, 6

Liontree Arena, San Diego, CA
Attendance: 2,987
Referees: Grant Jeffres, Pete Larson, Eric Curry

=== at UC Davis ===
ESPN2

March 8, 2025
8:00 p.m.

Recap

UC San Diego Tritons 68, UC Davis Aggies 57
Scoring by half: 34–22, 34–35
Pts: Tyler McGhie, 18; Rebs: Aniwaniwa Tait-Jones, 8 Asts: Hayden Gray, 6	Pts: Leo DeBruhl, 19; Rebs: Nils Cooper, 13; Asts: Leo DeBruhl, 6

University Credit Union Center, Davis, CA
Attendance: 4,281
Referees: Justin Albrecht, Ray Ames, Casey McClellan

=== UC Santa Barbara (Big West Tournament semifinal) ===
ESPN+

March 14, 2025
6:00 p.m.

Recap

No. 5 UC Santa Barbara Gauchos 51, No. 1 UC San Diego Tritons 69
Scoring by half: 27–26, 24–43
Pts: Tied, 12; Rebs: Jason Fontenet II, 7 Asts: Stephan Swenson, 6	Pts: Aniwaniwa Tait-Jones, 20; Rebs: Aniwaniwa Tait-Jones, 8 Asts: Aniwaniwa Tait-Jones, 8

Lee's Family Forum, Henderson, NV
Referees: Matthew Rusakin, Antonio Petty, Brooks Wells

=== UC Irvine (Big West Tournament final) ===
ESPN2

March 15, 2025
6:40 p.m.

Recap

No. 2 UC Irvine Anteaters 61, No. 1 UC San Diego Tritons 75
Scoring by half: 33–31, 28–44
Pts: Justin Hohn, 18; Rebs: Tied, 7 Asts: Devin Tillis, 8	Pts: Hayden Gray, 22; Rebs: Aniwaniwa Tait-Jones, 8 Asts: Aniwaniwa Tait-Jones, 8

Lee's Family Forum, Henderson, NV
Attendance: 2,632
Referees: Tony Padilla, Randy McCall, Deron White

=== No. 14 Michigan (NCAA First Round) ===
TBS

March 20, 2025
8:00 p.m.

Recap

No.12 UC San Diego Tritons 65, No.5 Michigan Wolverines 68
Scoring by half: 27–41, 38–27
Pts: Tyler McGhie, 25; Rebs: Tyler McGhie, 9 Asts: Tied, 3	Pts: Vladislav Goldin, 14; Rebs: Danny Wolf, 11; Asts: Nimari Burnett, 4

Ball Arena, Denver, CO
Attendance: 19,302
Referees: Justin Porterfield, Verne Harris, Lee Cassell

== Rankings ==
Ranking movements Legend: ██ Increase in ranking ██ Decrease in ranking — = Not ranked RV = Received votes
	Week																				
Poll	Pre	1	2	3	4	5	6	7	8	9	10	11	12	13	14	15	16	17	18	19	Final
AP	—	—	—	—	—	—	—	—	—	—	—	—	—	—	—	—	RV	RV	RV	RV	RV
Coaches	—	—	—	—	—	—	—	—	—	RV	—	—	—	—	RV	RV	RV	RV	RV	RV	RV

== Awards and honors ==
=== In-season awards ===
In-season Awards
Name	Award	Date
Tyler McGhie	Boardwalk Battle Most Valuable Player	November 23, 2024
Tyler McGhie	Big West Player of the Week	November 25, 2024
Tyler McGhie	Lou Henson National Player of the Week	December 23, 2024
Tyler McGhie	Big West Player of the Week	December 23, 2024
Aniwaniwa Tait-Jones	Boardwalk Battle All-Tournament Team	November 23, 2024
Aniwaniwa Tait-Jones	Lou Henson National Player of the Week	January 27, 2025
Aniwaniwa Tait-Jones	Big West Player of the Week	January 27, 2025
Aniwaniwa Tait-Jones	Big West Player of the Week	February 10, 2025
Hayden Gray	Naismith Defensive Player of the Year Watch List	February 5, 2025

=== Postseason awards ===
Postseason Awards
Name	Award	Date
Aniwaniwa Tait-Jones	Big West Player of the Year	March 11, 2025
Aniwaniwa Tait-Jones	All-Big West Men's Basketball First Team	March 11, 2025
Aniwaniwa Tait-Jones	Big West Tournament Most Valuable Player	March 15, 2025
Aniwaniwa Tait-Jones	NABC Division I Pacific District First Team	March 18, 2025
Hayden Gray	Big West Best Defense Player	March 11, 2025
Hayden Gray	All-Big West Men's Basketball Second Team	March 11, 2025
Hayden Gray	Naismith Defensive Player of the Year Finalist	March 12, 2025
Hayden Gray	Big West All-Tournament Team	March 15, 2025
Chris Howell	Big West Best Hustle Player	March 11, 2025
Justin Rochelin	Big West Best Sixth Player	March 11, 2025
Tyler McGhie	All-Big West Men's Basketball First Team	March 11, 2025

== See also ==
- 2024–25 UC San Diego Tritons women's basketball team
