= 2024–25 Big West Conference men's basketball season =

- League: NCAA Division I
- Sport: Basketball
- Teams: 11
- TV partner(s): ESPN+, ESPNU, ESPN2

2024–25 NCAA Division I men's basketball season
- Season champions: UC San Diego
- Season MVP: Aniwaniwa Tait-Jones, UC San Diego

Big West tournament
- Venue: Lee's Family Forum, Henderson, Nevada
- Champions: UC San Diego
- Runners-up: UC Irvine
- Finals MVP: Aniwaniwa Tait-Jones

Big West Conference men's basketball seasons
- ← 2023–24 2025–26 →

2024–25 Big West men's basketball standings
| | Conf. | | | | Overall |
| Team | W | | L | PCT | W | | L | PCT |
|---|---|---|---|---|---|---|---|---|
| UC San Diego † | 18 | – | 2 | .900 | 30 | – | 5 | .857 |
| UC Irvine | 17 | – | 3 | .850 | 32 | – | 7 | .821 |
| UC Riverside | 14 | – | 6 | .700 | 21 | – | 13 | .618 |
| Cal State Northridge | 14 | – | 6 | .700 | 22 | – | 11 | .667 |
| UC Santa Barbara | 11 | – | 9 | .550 | 21 | – | 13 | .618 |
| UC Davis | 9 | – | 11 | .450 | 15 | – | 17 | .469 |
| Cal Poly | 8 | – | 12 | .400 | 16 | – | 19 | .457 |
| Cal State Bakersfield | 8 | – | 12 | .400 | 14 | – | 19 | .424 |
| Hawai'i | 7 | – | 13 | .350 | 15 | – | 16 | .484 |
| Long Beach State | 3 | – | 17 | .150 | 7 | – | 25 | .219 |
| Cal State Fullerton | 1 | – | 19 | .050 | 6 | – | 26 | .188 |
† 2025 Big West tournament winner

The 2024–25 Big West Conference men's basketball season was for the Big West Conference in the 2024–25 NCAA Division I men's basketball season. The basketball teams began with practices in October followed by the start of season in November 2024. Conference play began on December 5, 2024, and ended in March, after which the top 8 member teams participated in the 2025 Big West Conference men's basketball tournament at Lee's Family Forum in Henderson, Nevada. Tournament champion UC San Diego received the conference's automatic bid to the 2025 NCAA tournament.

This is the first season in which the UC San Diego Tritons were eligible to participate in postseason play after fully completing their transition to NCAA Division I.

Each team played 20 conference games in round-robin format. The Big West conference also added a "Bold Week" in December 5–7, 2024, where two early conference games will be held. This decision was made in order for better experience and eliminating three-game weeks.

With a 85–67 win at UC Irvine on February 8, 2025, UC San Diego moved back to tie with the Anteaters at first place. On February 20, a loss by UC Irvine made the Tritons gain sole possession of first place standings, and on March 8, the Tritons won the regular season championship title outright with a win at UC Davis, their first ever outright championship. UC San Diego guard/forward Aniwaniwa Tait-Jones was named Big West Player of the Year and Triton head coach Eric Olen was named Big West Coach of the Year.

The Big West tournament was held from March 12 through March 15 at Lee's Family Forum in Henderson, Nevada. UC San Diego defeated UC Irvine 75–61 to win the school's first Big West tournament championship.

UC San Diego received the conference's automatic NCAA tournament bid, while UC Irvine, UC Riverside and Cal State Northridge earned bids to the NIT, a conference record of most teams making the NIT. The Tritons were seeded 12th in the South region, where they lost to 5th seeded Michigan 65-68. The Highlanders and the Matadors also suffered first-round exits, while the Anteaters advanced all the way to the championship game, where they fell to Chattanooga 84–85 in overtime.

== Head coaches ==
=== Coaching changes ===
==== Cal Poly ====
Following the 2023–24 season, Cal Poly head coach John Smith left the Mustangs to be the special assistant to the head coach at the University of Washington. On March 26, 2024, the school hired Colorado Mesa head coach Mike DeGeorge as the team's new head coach.

==== Long Beach State ====
Following the 2023–24 season, Long Beach State head coach Dan Monson was hired as the head coach at Eastern Washington. On April 2, the Beach hired San Diego State assistant coach Chris Acker as the team's new head coach.

=== Coaches ===
| Team | Head coach | Previous job | Years at school | Overall record | Big West record | Big West titles | Big West tournament titles | NCAA Tournaments |
|---|---|---|---|---|---|---|---|---|
| Cal Poly | Mike DeGeorge | Colorado Mesa | 1 | 0–0 (–) | 0–0 (–) | 0 | 0 | 0 |
| Cal State Bakersfield | Rod Barnes | Georgia State | 14 | 196–212 (.480) | 25–45 (.357) | 0 | 0 | 1 |
| Cal State Fullerton | Dedrique Taylor | Arizona State (Assoc.) | 12 | 155–179 (.464) | 81–87 (.482) | 0 | 2 | 2 |
| Cal State Northridge | Andy Newman | Cal State San Bernardino | 2 | 19–15 (.559) | 9–11 (.450) | 0 | 0 | 0 |
| Hawaii | Eran Ganot | Saint Mary's(Asst.) | 10 | 156–102 (.605) | 88–64 (.579) | 1 | 1 | 1 |
| Long Beach State | Chris Acker | San Diego State(Asst.) | 1 | 0–0 (–) | 0–0 (–) | 0 | 0 | 0 |
| UC Davis | Jim Les | Bradley | 14 | 195–199 (.495) | 110–98 (.529) | 2 | 1 | 1 |
| UC Irvine | Russell Turner | Golden State Warriors(Asst.) | 15 | 299–180 (.624) | 155–67 (.698) | 7 | 2 | 2 |
| UC Riverside | Mike Magpayo | UC Riverside(Asst.) | 5 | 68–50 (.576) | 41–26 (.612) | 0 | 0 | 0 |
| UC San Diego | Eric Olen | UC San Diego(Asst.) | 12 | 210–114 (.648) | 27–29 (.482) | 0 | 0 | 4 |
| UC Santa Barbara | Joe Pasternack | Arizona (Assoc.) | 8 | 148–68 (.685) | 73–41 (.640) | 2 | 2 | 2 |

Notes:

- All records, appearances, titles, etc. are from time with current school only.
- Year at school includes 2024–25 season.
- Overall and Big West records are from time at current school only and are through the beginning of the season.

== Preseason ==
=== Preseason Big West poll ===
The Big West Preseason Coaches' Poll was released on October 15, 2024.

| | Team | Points |
| 1. | UC Irvine | 92 (8) |
| 2. | UC Santa Barbara | 85 (2) |
| 3. | UC San Diego | 77 |
| 4. | UC Riverside | 75 (1) |
| 5. | UC Davis | 67 |
| 6. | Cal State Northridge | 57 |
| 7. | Hawai'i | 46 |
| 8. | Long Beach State | 39 |
| 9. | Cal State Bakersfield | 28 |
| 10. | Cal State Fullerton | 22 |
| 11. | Cal Poly | 11 |
(#) first-place votes

=== Big West Preseason All-Big West Team ===
| School | Player | Pos. | Yr. | Ht., Wt. | Hometown |
|---|---|---|---|---|---|
| UC Riverside | Barrington Hargress | G | RS Sophomore | 6'0", 195 | Inglewood, CA |
| UC Irvine | Justin Hohn | G | Graduate Student | 6'2", 185 | Sioux Falls, SD |
| UC Davis | TY Johnson | G | Senior | 6'3", 190 | Chicago, IL |
| Cal State Northridge | Keonte Jones | F | Senior | 6'6", 192 | Madison, WI |
| UC Santa Barbara | Stephan Swenson | G | Graduate Student | 6'2", 195 | Brussels, Belgium |
| UC San Diego | Aniwaniwa Tait-Jones | G/F | Senior | 6'6", 200 | Wellington, New Zealand |

== Regular season ==
=== National Rankings ===
Legend
| | Improvement in ranking |
| | Drop in ranking |
| | Not ranked previous week |
| RV | Received votes but were not ranked in Top 25 of poll |
| (Italics) | Number of first place votes |

| | | Pre/ Wk 1 | Wk 2 | Wk 3 | Wk 4 | Wk 5 | Wk 6 | Wk 7 | Wk 8 | Wk 9 | Wk 10 | Wk 11 | Wk 12 | Wk 13 | Wk 14 | Wk 15 | Wk 16 | Wk 17 | Wk 18 | Wk 19 | Wk 20 | Final |
|---|---|---|---|---|---|---|---|---|---|---|---|---|---|---|---|---|---|---|---|---|---|---|
| Cal Poly | AP | | | | | | | | | | | | | | | | | | | | | |
| Cal Poly | C | | | | | | | | | | | | | | | | | | | | | |
| Cal State Bakersfield | AP | | | | | | | | | | | | | | | | | | | | | |
| Cal State Bakersfield | C | | | | | | | | | | | | | | | | | | | | | |
| Cal State Fullerton | AP | | | | | | | | | | | | | | | | | | | | | |
| Cal State Fullerton | C | | | | | | | | | | | | | | | | | | | | | |
| Cal State Northridge | AP | | | | | | | | | | | | | | | | | | | | | |
| Cal State Northridge | C | | | | | | | | | | | | | | | | | | | | | |
| Hawaii | AP | | | | | | | | | | | | | | | | | | | | | |
| Hawaii | C | | | | | | | | | | | | | | | | | | | | | |
| Long Beach State | AP | | | | | | | | | | | | | | | | | | | | | |
| Long Beach State | C | | | | | | | | | | | | | | | | | | | | | |
| UC Davis | AP | | | | | | | | | | | | | | | | | | | | | |
| UC Davis | C | | | | | | | | | | | | | | | | | | | | | |
| UC Irvine | AP | | | | RV | | | | | | RV | RV | | | | | | | | | | |
| UC Irvine | C | | | | RV | RV | | | | | RV | RV | RV | RV | | | | | | | | |
| UC Riverside | AP | | | | | | | | | | | | | | | | | | | | | |
| UC Riverside | C | | | | | | | | | | | | | | | | | | | | | |
| UC San Diego | AP | | | | | | | | | | | | | | | | RV | RV | RV | RV | RV | RV |
| UC San Diego | C | | | | | | | | | RV | | | | | RV | RV | RV | RV | RV | RV | RV | RV |
| UC Santa Barbara | AP | | | | | | | | | | | | | | | | | | | | | |
| UC Santa Barbara | C | | | | | | | | | | | | | | | | | | | | | |

=== Final NET Rankings ===
| | Team | NET Rankings |
| 1. | UC San Diego | 35 |
| 2. | UC Irvine | 62 |
| 3. | Cal State Northridge | 104 |
| 4. | UC Santa Barbara | 140 |
| 5. | UC Riverside | 142 |
| 6. | Cal Poly | 180 |
| 7. | Hawai'i | 223 |
| 8. | UC Davis | 237 |
| 9. | Cal State Bakersfield | 244 |
| 10. | Long Beach State | 326 |
| 11. | Cal State Fullerton | 348 |

=== Players of the Week ===
Throughout the conference regular season, the Big West will name one player of the week each Monday.

| Date | Player of the Week | School |
|---|---|---|
| November 11, 2024 | TY Johnson | UC Davis |
| November 18, 2024 | Tanner Christensen | Hawai'i |
| November 25, 2024 | Tyler McGhie | UC San Diego |
| December 2, 2024 | Owen Koonce | Cal Poly |
| December 9, 2024 | Devin Askew | Long Beach State |
| December 16, 2024 | Kam Martin | Long Beach State（2） |
| December 23, 2024 | Tyler McGhie (2) | UC San Diego (2) |
| December 30, 2024 | Barrington Hargress | UC Riverside |
| January 6, 2025 | Marcus Adams Jr. | Cal State Northridge |
| January 13, 2025 | Bent Leuchten | UC Irvine |
| January 20, 2025 | TY Johnson (2) | UC Davis (2) |
| January 27, 2025 | Aniwaniwa Tait-Jones | UC San Diego (3) |
| February 3, 2025 | Scotty Washington | Cal State Northridge (2) |
| February 10, 2025 | Aniwaniwa Tait-Jones (2) | UC San Diego (4) |
| February 17, 2025 | Scotty Washington (2） | Cal State Northridge (3) |
| February 24, 2025 | Marcus Adams Jr. (2） | Cal State Northridge (4) |
| March 3, 2025 | Jemel Jones | Cal State Bakersfield |
| March 10, 2025 | Barrington Hargress (2) | UC Riverside (2) |

=== Early season tournaments ===
Of the 11 Big West Teams, 6 participated in early season tournaments. UC San Diego won the Boardwalk Battle Title with a 80–45 win over Toledo, UC Irvine claimed the Western Slam champions winning Towson 67-60, and with a 76–66 victory over Pacific, Hawaii captured the Outrigger Rainbow Classic title.

| Team | Tournament | Finish |
|---|---|---|
| Cal State Bakersfield | Hollywood Suites Classic | T-3rd |
| Cal State Northridge | Stew Morrill Classic | 2nd |
| Hawai'i | Outrigger Rainbow Classic | 1st |
| Hawai'i | Diamond Head Classic | 3rd |
| Long Beach State | Ball Dawgs Classic | 4th |
| UC Irvine | Western Slam | 1st |
| UC San Diego | Boardwalk Battle | 1st |

=== Conference matrix ===
The table below summarizes the head-to-head results between teams in conference regular-season play. The home team's score is shown in boldface type.

| | Cal Poly | Cal State Bakersfield | Cal State Fullerton | Cal State Northridge | Hawai'i | Long Beach State | UC Davis | UC Irvine | UC Riverside | UC San Diego | UC Santa Barbara |
|---|---|---|---|---|---|---|---|---|---|---|---|
| vs. Cal Poly | – | **81**–90; 72–**98** | **83**–98; 61–**100** | 102–**91**; **89**–85 | **68**–55; 63–**79** | **69**–78; 69–**83** | **77**-66; 65-**54** | 98–**89**^{OT} **101**–71 | **80**–62; 100–**112**^{OT} | **95**-68; 81-**67** | 75-**72**; **96**-77 |
| vs. Cal State Bakersfield | 90–**81**; **98**–72 | – | **68**-71; 54-**91** | 90–**94**; **88**–62 | **81**–70; 64–**76** | 65–**80**; **87**–88^{OT} | 64–**75**; **66**–71 | **82**-66; 73-**64** | 83-**79**; **69**-64 | **81**-60; 73-**54** | **78**-66; 81-**75** |
| vs. Cal State Fullerton | 98–**83**; **100**–61 | 71–**68**; **91**–54 | – | 95–**65**; **82**–63 | 95–**86**; **82**–57 | 73–**56**; **67**–83 | **63**-53; 65-**49** | **82**-62; 76-**51** | **75**-68; 64-**59** | 90-**51**; **100**-55 | 83-**76**; **85**-56 |
| vs. Cal State Northridge | **91**–102; 85–**89** | **94**–90; 62–**88** | **65**–95; 63–**82** | – | **60**–83; 73–**82** | 76–**86**; **80**–81 | 61–**73**; **62**–65 | 77–**67**; **72**–84 | 68-**64**; **94**-79 | **79**-54; 77-**71** | **71**-78; 77-**103** |
| vs. Hawai'i | 55–**68**; **79**–63 | 70–**81**; **76**–64 | **86**–95; 57–**82** | 83–**60**; **82**–73 | – | **76**–68; 60–**62** | **68**–66; 70–**78** | **71**-55; 66-**49** | **76**–83; 82–**76** | 74-**63**; **83**-44 | 64-**61**; **76**-72 |
| vs. Long Beach State | **78**-69; 83-**69** | **80**-65; 88-**87**^{OT} | **56**–73; 83–**67** | **86**-76; 81-**80** | 68–**76**; **62**–60 | – | **73**–84; 73–**65**^{OT} | 80-**75**^{OT} **70**-60 | 76-**60**; **87**-66 | 80-**54**; **70**-63 | **85**-54; 58-**56** |
| vs. UC Davis | 66–**77**; **54**–65 | **75**-64; 71-**66** | 53–**63**; **49**–65 | **73**-61; 65-**62** | 66–**68**; **78**–70 | 84–**73**; **65**–73^{OT} | – | **73**-66; 88-**59** | **60**–58; 74–**75** | **85**-60; 68-**57** | 60–**71**; **60**–64 |
| vs. UC Irvine | **89**–98^{OT} 71–**101** | 66–**82**; **64**–73 | 62–**82**; **51**–76 | **67**–77; 84–**72** | **55**-71; 49-**66** | **75**–80^{OT} 60–**70** | 66–**73**; **59**–88 | – | 57–**81**; **84**–80^{OT} | **52**–60; 85–**67** | 60–**62**; **89**–97 |
| vs. UC Riverside | 62–**80**; **112**–100^{OT} | **79**-83; 64-**69** | 68–**75**; **59**–64 | **64**–68; 79–**94** | 83–**76**; **76**–82 | **60**–76; 66–**87** | 58–**60**; **75**–74 | **81**–57; 80–**84**^{OT} | – | 81–**85**; **91**–71 | **66**–63; 69–**81** |
| vs. UC San Diego | 68–**95**; **67**–81 | 60–**81**; **54**–73 | **51**–90; 55–**100** | 54–**79**; **71**–77 | **63**-74; 44-**83** | **54**–80; 63–**70** | 60–**85**; **57**–68 | 60–**52**; **85**–67 | **85**–81; 71–**91** | – | **84**-76; 63-**77** |
| vs. UC Santa Barbara | **72**-75; 77-**96** | 66–**78**; **75**–81 | **75**–83; 56–**86** | 78–**71**; **103**–77 | **61**-64; 72-**76** | 54–**85**; **56**–58 | **71**-60; 64-**60** | **62**-60; 97-**88** | 63–**66**; **81**–69 | 84-**76**; **77**-63 | – |
| Record | **8–12** | **8–12** | **1–19** | **14–6** | **7–13** | **3–17** | **9–11** | **17–3** | **14–6** | **18–2** | **11–9** |

=== Records against other conferences ===
2024-25 records against non-conference opponents. Does not include exhibition matchups but includes postseason matchups.

| Power 5 Conferences | Record |
|---|---|
| ACC | 1–6 |
| Big East | 0–0 |
| Big Ten | 0–6 |
| Big 12 | 0–3 |
| SEC | 0–0 |
| Power 5 Total | 1–15 |
| Other NCAA Division I Conferences | Record |
| America East | 0–0 |
| American | 4–2 |
| A-10 | 1–2 |
| ASUN | 0–1 |
| Big Sky | 14–4 |
| Big South | 0–0 |
| CAA | 2–0 |
| C-USA | 2–3 |
| Horizon League | 2–0 |
| Ivy League | 0–0 |
| MAAC | 0–0 |
| MAC | 2–0 |
| MEAC | 1–0 |
| MVC | 2–1 |
| Mountain West | 6–6 |
| NEC | 2–0 |
| OVC | 0–0 |
| Patriot League | 0–0 |
| SoCon | 0–2 |
| Southland | 2–0 |
| SWAC | 3–0 |
| Summit | 6–1 |
| Sun Belt | 1–0 |
| WAC | 5–4 |
| WCC | 10–13 |
| Other Division I Total | 65-39 |
| NCAA Division I Total | 66-64 |
| NCAA Non Division I Total | 20-0 |
| Grand Total | 86-64 |

== Postseason ==
=== Big West tournament ===
- The 2025 Big West Conference Basketball Tournament was held at the Lee's Family Forum in Henderson, Nevada, from March 12–15, 2025.

First Round; Wednesday, March 12
5 | UC Santa Barbara | 71
8 | Cal State Bakersfield | 66
6 | UC Davis | 76
7 | Cal Poly | 86

Quarterfinals; Thursday, March 13
4 | Cal State Northridge | 72
5 | UC Santa Barbara | 78
3 | UC Riverside | 83
7 | Cal Poly | 96

Semifinals; Friday, March 14
1 | UC San Diego | 69
5 | UC Santa Barbara | 51
2 | UC Irvine | 96
7 | Cal Poly | 78

Championship; Saturday, March 15
1 | UC San Diego | 75
2 | UC Irvine | 61

==== First round ====
ESPN+

March 12
6:00 pm

Recap

No. 8 Cal State Bakersfield 66, No. 5 UC Santa Barbara 71
Scoring by half: 25-32, 41–39
| Pts: Jemel Jones, 15; Rebs: Corey Stephenson, 9 Asts: Jemel Jones, 4 | Pts: Stephan Swenson, 15; Rebs: Kenny Pohto, 7 Asts: Jason Fontenet II, 5 |

Lee's Family Forum
Henderson, Nevada
Referees: Justin Shamion, Chad Shepherd, Jeff Campbell

ESPN+

March 12
8:30 pm

Recap

No. 7 Cal Poly 86, No. 6 UC Davis 76
Scoring by half: 38-47, 48–29
| Pts: Owen Koonce, 18; Rebs: Tied, 5 Asts: Owen Koonce, 6 | Pts: Pablo Tamba, 25; Rebs: Tied, 4 Asts: TY Johnson, 11 |

Lee's Family Forum
Henderson, Nevada
Attendance: 1,105
Referees: Jeffery Malham, Antinio Petty, Bill Vinovich

==== Quarterfinals ====
ESPN+

March 13
6:00 pm

Recap

No. 5 UC Santa Barbara 78, No. 4 Cal State Northridge 72
Scoring by half: 35-28, 43-44
| Pts: Stephan Swenson, 25; Rebs: Jason Fontenet II, 5 Asts: Jason Fontenet II, 5 | Pts: Keonte Jones, 19; Rebs: Keonte Jones, 11; Asts: Tied, 3 |

Lee's Family Forum
Henderson, Nevada
Referees: Matthew Rusakin, Eric Curry, Deron White

ESPN+

March 13
8:30 pm

Recap

No. 7 Cal Poly 96, No. 3 UC Riverside 83
Scoring by half: 45–36, 51–47
| Pts: Owen Koonce, 20; Rebs: Cayden Ward, 13; Asts: Jarred Hyder, 9 | Pts: Isaiah Moses, 30; Rebs: Kaleb Smith, 11; Asts: Barrington Hargress, 5 |

Lee's Family Forum
Henderson, Nevada
Attendance: 1,185
Referees: Robert Lehigh, Antinio Petty, Darron George

==== Semifinals ====
ESPN+

March 14
6:00 pm

Recap

No. 5 UC Santa Barbara 51, No. 1 UC San Diego 69
Scoring by half: 27-26, 24-43
| Pts: Tied, 12; Rebs: Jason Fontenet II, 7 Asts: Stephan Swenson, 6 | Pts: Aniwaniwa Tait-Jones, 20; Rebs: Aniwaniwa Tait-Jones, 8 Asts: Aniwaniwa Tait-Jones, 9 |

Lee's Family Forum
Henderson, Nevada
Referees: Matthew Rusakin, Antonio Petty, Brooks Wells

ESPN2

March 14
8:30 pm

Recap

No. 7 Cal Poly 78, No. 2 UC Irvine 96
Scoring by half: 39-38, 39-58
| Pts: Mac Riniker, 22; Rebs: Mac Riniker, 6 Asts: Peter Bandelj, 5 | Pts: Bent Leuchten, 21; Rebs: Bent Leuchten, 10; Asts: Devin Tillis, 6 |

Lee's Family Forum
Henderson, Nevada
Attendance: 2,006
Referees: Deron White, Eric Curry, Bill Vinovich

==== Championship ====
ESPN2

March 15
6:40 pm

Recap

No. 2 UC Irvine 61, No. 1 UC San Diego 75
Scoring by half: 33-31, 28-44
| Pts: Justin Hohn, 18; Rebs: Tied, 7 Asts: Devin Tillis, 8 | Pts: Hayden Gray, 22; Rebs: Aniwaniwa Tait-Jones, 8 Asts: Aniwaniwa Tait-Jones, 8 |

Lee's Family Forum
Henderson, Nevada
Attendance: 2,632
Referees: Tony Padilla, Randy McCall, Deron White

=== NCAA tournament ===
| Seed | Region | School | First Four | First round | Second round | Sweet 16 | Elite Eight | Final Four | Championship |
|---|---|---|---|---|---|---|---|---|---|
| 12 | South | UC San Diego | Bye | L 65–68 vs. (12) Michigan (Denver) | DNP | | | | |
| | | W–L (%): | 0–0 (–) | 0–1 (.000) | 0–0 (–) | 0–0 (–) | 0–0 (–) | 0–0 (–) | 0–0 (–) |
Total: 0–1 (.000)

==== First round ====
TBS

March 20
8:00 pm

Recap

No. 12 UC San Diego 65, No. 5 Michigan 68
Scoring by half: 27-41, 38–27
| Pts: Tyler McGhie, 25; Rebs: Tyler McGhie, 9 Asts: Tied, 3 | Pts: Vladislav Goldin, 14; Rebs: Danny Wolf, 11; Asts: Nimari Burnett, 4 |

Ball Arena
Denver, Colorado
Attendance: 19,302
Referees: Justin Porterfield, Verne Harris, Lee Cassell

=== National Invitation tournament ===
| Seed | Bracket | School | 1st round | 2nd round | Quarterfinals | Semifinals | Championship |
|---|---|---|---|---|---|---|---|
| 1 | Irvine | UC Irvine | W 82–72 vs. Northern Colorado (Irvine) | W 66-61 vs. Jacksonville State (Irvine) | W 81-77^{OT} vs. UAB (Irvine) | W 69-67 vs. North Texas (Indianapolis) | L 84-85^{OT} vs. Chattanooga (Indianapolis) |
| N/A | San Francisco | Cal State Northridge | L 70–87 vs. Stanford (Stanford) | DNP | | | |
| N/A | Irvine | UC Riverside | L 62–101 vs. Santa Clara (Santa Clara) | DNP | | | |
| | | W–L (%): | 1–2 (.333) | 1–0 (1.000) | 1–0 (1.000) | 1–0 (1.000) | 0–1 (.000) |
Total: 4–3 (.571)

==== First round ====
ESPNU

March 18
8:00 pm

Recap

UC Riverside 62, No. 2 Santa Clara 101
Scoring by half: 33-44, 29-57
| Pts: Nate Pickens, 15; Rebs: Tied, 4 Asts: Barrington Hargress, 5 | Pts: Tyeree Bryan, 17; Rebs: Tied, 7 Asts: Elijah Mahi, 5 |

Leavey Center
Santa Clara, California
Attendance: 672
Referees: De Selle Dean, Jason Garretson, Mark Fulton

ESPN2

March 18
8:00 pm

Recap

Cal State Northridge 70, No. 2 Stanford 87
Scoring by half: 29-46, 41-41
| Pts: Keonte Jones, 18; Rebs: Grady Lewis, 7 Asts: Tyler Beard, 4 | Pts: Maxime Reynauld, 22; Rebs: Maxime Reynauld, 11; Asts: Jaylen Blakes, 4 |

Maples Pavilion
Stanford, California
Attendance: 1,119
Referees: Layne Barney, Martin Cichocki, Pete Larson

ESPN+

March 20
8:00 pm

Recap

Northern Colorado 72, No. 1 UC Irvine 82
Scoring by half: 41–37, 31-45
| Pts: Brock Wisne, 15; Rebs: Isaiah Hawthorne, 12; Asts: Langston Reynolds, 5 | Pts: Devin Tillis, 24; Rebs: Bent Leuchten, 10; Asts: Justin Hohn, 5 |

Bren Events Center
Irvine, California
Attendance: 1,241
Referees: Kirk Smith, Matthew Rusakin, Ryan Holmes

==== Second round ====
ESPN+

March 23
6:00 pm

Recap

Jacksonville State 61, No. 1 UC Irvine 66
Scoring by half: 35-36, 26-30
| Pts: Jaron Pierre Jr., 15; Rebs: Jaron Pierre Jr., 11; Asts: Jaron Pierre Jr., 4 | Pts: Justin Hohn, 22; Rebs: Devin Tillis, 9 Asts: Justin Hohn, 4 |

Bren Events Center
Irvine, California
Attendance: 1,304
Referees: Matthew Rusakin, Jason Garretson, Robert Lehigh

==== Quarterfinals ====
ESPN2

March 26
6:00 pm

Recap

UAB 77, No. 1 UC Irvine 81 (OT)
Scoring by half: 36-31, 33-38 Overtime: 8-12
| Pts: Christian Coleman, 21; Rebs: Yaxel Lendeborg, 17; Asts: Yaxel Lendeborg, 4 | Pts: Devin Tillis, 22; Rebs: Devin Tillis, 11; Asts: Tied, 5 |

Bren Events Center
Irvine, California
Attendance: 1,378
Referees: Justin Shamion, James Ford, DG Nelson

==== Semifinals ====
ESPN

April 1
4:00 pm

Recap

No. 2 North Texas 67, No. 1 UC Irvine 69
Scoring by half: 30-30, 37-39
| Pts: Atin Wright, 25; Rebs: Moulaye Sissoko, 13; Asts: Jasper Floyd, 3 | Pts: Devin Tillis, 16; Rebs: Devin Tillis, 11; Asts: Justin Hohn, 8 |

Hinkle Fieldhouse
Indianapolis, Indiana
Attendance: 3,288
Referees: Vladimir Voyard-Tadal, Deldre Carr, Bret Smith

==== Championship ====
ESPN

April 3
6:00 pm

Recap

Chattanooga 85, No. 1 UC Irvine 84 (OT)
Scoring by half: 38-37, 38-39 Overtime: 9-8
| Pts: Tied, 19; Rebs: Tied, 10; Asts: Garrison Keeslar, 5 | Pts: Devin Tillis, 19; Rebs: Bent Leuchten, 11; Asts: Justin Hohn, 4 |

Hinkle Fieldhouse
Indianapolis, Indiana
Attendance: 2,825
Referees: Matt Potter, Michael Greenstein, Byron Jarrett

== Awards and honors ==
=== All-Big West Teams and Awards ===
The Big West Conference announced its 2024-25 Men's Basketball All-Big West Teams and Awards on March 11, 2025.

==== Individual Awards ====
| Honor | Recipient | School |
|---|---|---|
| Coach of the Year | Eric Olen | UC San Diego |
| Player of the Year | Aniwaniwa Tait-Jones | UC San Diego |
| Newcomer of the Year | Jemel Jones | Cal State Bakersfield |
| Freshman of the Year | Jurian Dixon | UC Irvine |
| Best Defensive Player | Hayden Gray | UC San Diego |
| Best Hustle Player | Chris Howell | UC San Diego |
| Best Sixth Player | Justin Rochelin | UC San Diego |

==== All-Big West First Team ====
| Player | Pos. | Yr. | Ht., Wt. | Hometown | School |
|---|---|---|---|---|---|
| Barrington Hargress | G | RS Sophomore | 6'0", 195 | Inglewood, CA | UC Riverside |
| TY Johnson | G | Senior | 6'3", 190 | Chicago, IL | UC Davis |
| Keonte Jones | F | Senior | 6'6", 192 | Madison, WI | Cal State Northridge |
| Bent Leuchten | C | Senior | 7'1", 265 | Karlsfeld, Germany | UC Irvine |
| Tyler McGhie | G/F | Senior | 6'5", 195 | Denton, TX | UC San Diego |
| Aniwaniwa Tait-Jones | G/F | Senior | 6'6", 200 | Wellington, New Zealand | UC San Diego |

==== All-Big West Second Team ====
| Player | Pos. | Yr. | Ht., Wt. | Hometown | School |
|---|---|---|---|---|---|
| Marcus Adams Jr. | F | Sophomore | 6'8", 195 | Torrance, CA | Cal State Northridge |
| Hayden Gray | G | Senior | 6'4", 190 | San Diego, CA | UC San Diego |
| Jemel Jones | G | Junior | 6'4", N/A | Chicago, IL | Cal State Bakersfield |
| Stephan Swenson | G | Graduate Student | 6'2", 195 | Brussels, Belgium | UC Santa Barbara |
| Devin Tillis | F | RS Senior | 6'7", 225 | Los Angeles, CA | UC Irvine |

==== Honorable Mention ====
| Player | Pos. | Yr. | Ht., Wt. | Hometown | School |
|---|---|---|---|---|---|
| Cole Anderson | G | Senior | 6'4", 195 | Fresno, CA | UC Santa Barbara |
| Devin Askew | G | Senior | 6'5, 195 | Sacramento, CA | Long Beach State |
| Myles Che | G | Sophomore | 6'2", 190 | Los Angeles, CA | UC Irvine |
| Tanner Christensen | C | Graduate Student | 6'10", 265 | Spokane Valley, Wa | Hawai'i |
| Justin Hohn | G | Graduate Student | 6'2", 190 | Los Angeles, CA | UC Irvine |
| Owen Koonce | G/F | Graduate Student | 6'5", 195 | Lafayette, CO | Cal Poly |
| Kenny Pohto | F | Senior | 6'11", 240 | Stockholm, Sweden | UC Santa Barbara |
| Isaiah Moses | G | RS Junior | 6'1", N/A | Anchorage, AK | UC Riverside |
| Scotty Washington | G/F | Junior | 6'4", 180 | Del Amo, CA | Cal State Northridge |

=== NABC All-Pacific District Teams and Awards ===
On March 18, 2025, NABC announced the 2024-25 NABC Division I All-District Teams and District Coaches of the Year.

==== Coach of the Year ====
| Honor | Recipient | School |
|---|---|---|
| Pacific District Coach of the Year | Eric Olen | UC San Diego |

==== NABC All-Pacific District First Team ====
| Player | Pos. | Yr. | Ht., Wt. | Hometown | School |
|---|---|---|---|---|---|
| Aniwaniwa Tait-Jones | G/F | Senior | 6'6", 200 | Wellington, New Zealand | UC San Diego |
| Bent Leuchten | C | Senior | 7'1", 265 | Karlsfeld, Germany | UC Irvine |

==== NABC All-Pacific District Second Team ====
| Player | Pos. | Yr. | Ht., Wt. | Hometown | School |
|---|---|---|---|---|---|
| Barrington Hargress | G | RS Sophomore | 6'0", 195 | Inglewood, CA | UC Riverside |
| Devin Tillis | F | RS Senior | 6'7", 225 | Los Angeles, CA | UC Irvine |

== Statistics ==
- Specific statistics may vary with source and platform collected

=== Team Statistics ===
Team statistics
| | | Points | | | | | FG% | | 3-Pt% | | | Rebounds | | | Assists | | Blocks | | Steals | |
| Team | GP | For | Avg | Opp | Avg | Diff | For | Opp | For | Opp | FT% | For | Opp | Net | For | Avg | For | Avg | For | Avg |
|---|---|---|---|---|---|---|---|---|---|---|---|---|---|---|---|---|---|---|---|---|
| Cal Poly | 35 | 2,873 | 82.1 | 2,901 | 82.9 | -28 | 46.2% | 45.9% | 36.2% | 34.0% | 76.6% | 1,221 | 1,323 | -102 | 535 | 15.29 | 75 | 2.14 | 275 | 7.86 |
| Cal State Bakersfield | 33 | 2,434 | 73.8 | 2,430 | 73.6 | 4 | 43.8% | 45.6% | 38.0% | 34.4% | 77.2% | 1,173 | 1,040 | 133 | 334 | 10.12 | 92 | 2.79 | 225 | 6.82 |
| Cal State Fullerton | 32 | 2,024 | 63.3 | 2,475 | 77.3 | -451 | 40.2% | 45.8% | 27.1% | 35.0% | 74.2% | 1,064 | 1,132 | -68 | 288 | 9.00 | 62 | 1.94 | 170 | 5.31 |
| Cal State Northridge | 33 | 2,650 | 80.3 | 2,406 | 72.9 | 244 | 46.8% | 40.4% | 34.5% | 35.1% | 72.5% | 1,322 | 1,045 | 277 | 539 | 16.33 | 95 | 2.88 | 250 | 7.58 |
| Hawai'i | 31 | 2,173 | 70.1 | 2,208 | 71.2 | -35 | 44.9% | 43.6% | 32.0% | 35.2% | 73.8% | 1,103 | 933 | 170 | 368 | 11.87 | 73 | 2.35 | 110 | 3.55 |
| Long Beach State | 32 | 2,152 | 67.3 | 2,374 | 74.2 | -222 | 43.3% | 45.3% | 34.9% | 37.6% | 75.6% | 1,021 | 1092 | -71 | 364 | 11.38 | 96 | 3.00 | 182 | 5.69 |
| UC Davis | 32 | 2,175 | 68.0 | 2,249 | 70.3 | -74 | 41.3% | 42.9% | 32.5% | 34.9% | 74.3% | 1,057 | 1159 | -102 | 354 | 11.06 | 115 | 3.59 | 252 | 7.88 |
| UC Irvine | 39 | 2,962 | 75.9 | 2,613 | 67.0 | 349 | 45.4% | 39.3% | 35.5% | 33.7% | 79.4% | 1,495 | 1347 | 148 | 612 | 15.69 | 134 | 3.44 | 256 | 6.56 |
| UC Riverside | 34 | 2,542 | 74.8 | 2,550 | 75.0 | -8 | 42.6% | 44.9% | 33.7% | 35.1% | 75.6% | 1,265 | 1,181 | 84 | 448 | 13.18 | 82 | 2.41 | 186 | 5.47 |
| UC San Diego | 35 | 2,777 | 79.3 | 2,163 | 61.8 | 614 | 46.4% | 39.7% | 36.2% | 32.9% | 74.6% | 1,190 | 1,204 | -14 | 550 | 15.71 | 74 | 2.11 | 345 | 9.86 |
| UC Santa Barbara | 34 | 2,527 | 74.3 | 2,340 | 68.8 | 187 | 46.3% | 42.7% | 38.1% | 31.0% | 76.4% | 1,153 | 1,124 | 29 | 508 | 14.94 | 106 | 3.12 | 205 | 6.03 |

=== Individual Statistics ===
Individual scoring average
| Rk | Player | School | PPG |
|---|---|---|---|
| 1 | TY Johnson | UC Davis | 21.09 |
| 2 | Barrington Hargress | UC Riverside | 20.17 |
| 3 | Aniwaniwa Tait-Jones | UC San Diego | 19.14 |
| 4 | Jemel Jones | Cal State Bakersfield | 18.94 |
| 5 | Devin Askew | Long Beach State | 18.87 |
| 6 | Owen Koonce | Cal Poly | 16.94 |
| 7 | Tyler McGhie | UC San Diego | 16.63 |
| 8 | Marcus Adams Jr. | Cal State Northridge | 16.06 |

Individual field-goal percentage
| Rk | Player | Team | FG% |
|---|---|---|---|
| 1 | Kenny Pohto | UC Santa Barbara | 62.2% |
| 2 | Pablo Tamba | UC Davis | 58.7% |
| 3 | Aniwaniwa Tait-Jones | UC San Diego | 57.6% |
| 4 | Bent Leuchten | UC Irvine | 54.4% |
| 5 | Devin Tillis | UC Irvine | 53.5% |
| 6 | Marcus Adams Jr. | Cal State Northridge | 52.6% |
| 7 | Owen Koonce | Cal Poly | 51.7% |
| 8 | Keonte Jones | Cal State Northridge | 50.6% |

Individual three-point field-goal percentage
| Rk | Player | Team | 3FG% |
|---|---|---|---|
| 1 | Cole Anderson | UC Santa Barbara | 47.4% |
| 2 | Stephan Swenson | UC Santa Barbara | 43.2% |
| 3 | Isaac Jessup | Cal Poly | 42.8% |
| 4 | Tyler McGhie | UC San Diego | 37.7% |
| 5 | Devin Askew | Long Beach State | 37.6% |
| 6 | Jarred Hyder | Cal Poly | 35.5% |
| 7 | Barrington Hargress | UC Riverside | 32.9% |
| 8 | Marvin McGhee III | Cal State Bakersfield | 32.2% |

Individual free-throw percentage
| Rk | Player | Team | FT% |
|---|---|---|---|
| 1 | Devin Askew | Long Beach State | 88.6% |
| 2 | Owen Koonce | Cal Poly | 88.1% |
| 3 | Jemel Jones | Cal State Bakersfield | 85.7% |
| 4 | Scotty Washington | Cal State Northridge | 85.5% |
| 5 | Myles Che | UC Irvine | 84.1% |
| 6 | Bent Leuchten | UC Irvine | 81.6% |
| 7 | Peter Bandelj | Cal Poly | 80.4% |
| 8 | CJ Hardy | Cal State Bakersfield | 78.9% |

Individual minutes average
| Rk | Player | School | MPG |
|---|---|---|---|
| 1 | Devin Askew | Long Beach State | 36.06 |
| 2 | TY Johnson | UC Davis | 33.65 |
| 3 | Jarred Hyder | Cal Poly | 32.85 |
| 4 | Hayden Gray | UC San Diego | 32.08 |
| 5 | Barrington Hargress | UC Riverside | 31.91 |
| 6 | Keonte Jones | Cal State Northridge | 30.91 |
| 7 | Isaac Jessup | Cal Poly | 30.58 |
| 8 | Tyler McGhie | UC San Diego | 30.51 |

Individual rebounds per game
| Rk | Player | Team | RPG |
|---|---|---|---|
| 1 | Bent Leuchten | UC Irvine | 9.08 |
| 2 | Keonte Jones | Cal State Northridge | 9.03 |
| 3 | Devin Tillis | UC Irvine | 7.79 |
| 4 | Tanner Christensen | Hawai'i | 6.93 |
| 5 | Derrick Michael Xzavierro | Long Beach State | 6.76 |
| 6 | Niko Rocak | UC Davis | 6.75 |
| 7 | Joel Armotrading | UC Riverside | 6.51 |
| 8 | Kenny Pohto | UC Santa Barbara | 6.17 |

Individual assists per game
| Rk | Player | Team | APG |
|---|---|---|---|
| 1 | Devin Askew | Long Beach State | 4.47 |
| 2 | Stephan Swenson | UC Santa Barbara | 4.36 |
| 3 | Keonte Jones | Cal State Northridge | 4.12 |
| 4 | Barrington Hargress | UC Riverside | 4.03 |
| 5 | Justin Hohn | UC Irvine | 3.81 |
| 6 | Aniwaniwa Tait-Jones | UC San Diego | 3.63 |
| 7 | Hayden Gray | UC San Diego | 3.31 |
| 8 | Tyler Beard | Cal State Northridge | 3.27 |

Individual assist/turnover ratio
| Rk | Player | Team | A/TO |
|---|---|---|---|
| 1 | Chris Howell | UC San Diego | 2.73 |
| 2 | Hayden Gray | UC San Diego | 2.47 |
| 3 | Barrington Hargress | UC Riverside | 2.07 |
| 4 | Stephan Swenson | UC Santa Barbara | 2.00 |
| 5 | Aniwaniwa Tait-Jones | UC San Diego | 1.79 |
| 6 | Tyler Beard | Cal State Northridge | 1.77 |
| 7 | Isaiah Moses | UC Riverside | 1.62 |
| 8 | Keonte Jones | Cal State Northridge | 1.56 |

Individual blocks per game
| Rk | Player | Team | BPG |
|---|---|---|---|
| 1 | Niko Rocak | UC Davis | 1.81 |
| 2 | Bent Leuchten | UC Irvine | 1.28 |
| 3 | Keonte Jones | Cal State Northridge | 1.27 |
| 4 | Derrick Michael Xzavierro | Long Beach State | 1.24 |
| 5 | Kyle Evans | UC Irvine | 1.23 |
| 6 | Joel Armotrading | UC Riverside | 1.21 |
| 7 | Fidelis Okereke | Cal State Bakersfield | 1.18 |
| 8 | Austin Johnson | Long Beach State | 0.78 |

Individual steals per game
| Rk | Player | Team | SPG |
|---|---|---|---|
| 1 | Hayden Gray | UC San Diego | 3.14 |
| 2 | TY Johnson | UC Davis | 2.25 |
| 3 | Chris Howell | UC San Diego | 2.17 |
| 4 | Keonte Jones | Cal State Northridge | 1.82 |
| 5 | Stephan Swenson | UC Santa Barbara | 1.79 |
| 6 | Isaac Jessup | Cal Poly | 1.55 |
| 7 | Mac Riniker | Cal Poly | 1.54 |
| 8 | Devin Askew | Long Beach State | 1.53 |

=== Top Big West Rankings in National Statistics ===
This section lists the Big West team with the highest national rank in each NCAA statistical category, including their rank and actual performance. The corresponding team's top individual performer is also included.

| Statistical Category | Team | National Ranking | Team Stat | Top Performer | Top Performer Stats |
|---|---|---|---|---|---|
| Assist/Turnover Ratio | UC San Diego | 4th | 1.80 | Hayden Gray | 2.47, 46th nationally |
| Assists Per Game | Cal State Northridge | 30th | 16.33 | Keonte Jones | 4.12, 138th nationally |
| Bench Points Per Game | Hawai'i | 29th | 28.19 | Gytis Nemeiksa | 11.35, N/A |
| Blocks Per Game | UC Davis | Tied-130th | 3.60 | Niko Rocak | 1.81, 33rd nationally |
| Effective Field Goal Percentage | UC San Diego | 29th | 55.5% | Maximo Milovich | 62.2%, N/A |
| Fastbreak Points Per Game | Cal Poly | 11th | 15.09 | N/A | N/A |
| Field Goal Percentage | Cal State Northridge | 67th | 46.78% | Marcus Adams Jr. | 52.62%, 64th nationally |
| Field Goal Percentage Defense | UC Irvine | 10th | 39.32% | N/A | N/A |
| (Fewest) Fouls Per Game | UC Irvine | 70th | 15.61 | N/A | N/A |
| Free Throw Attempts Per Game | Cal State Northridge | 37th | 22.03 | Keonte Jones | 4.85, N/A |
| Free Throw Percentage | UC Irvine | 5th | 79.37% | Myles Che | 84.11%, Tied-91st nationally |
| Free Throw Made Per Game | UC Irvine | 24th | 16.67 | Bent Leuchten | 5.46, 6th nationally |
| Rebound Margin | Cal State Northridge | 9th | 8.39 | N/A | N/A |
| Rebounds (Defensive) Per Game | UC Irvine | 3rd | 29.08 | Bent Leuchten | 6.59, 18th nationally |
| Rebounds (Offensive) Per Game | Cal State Bakersfield | 35th | 12.85 | Corey Stephenson | 2.31, 181st nationally |
| Rebounds Per Game | Cal State Northridge | 12th | 40.06 | Keonte Jones | 3.03, 32nd nationally |
| Scoring Defense | UC San Diego | 6th | 61.80 | N/A | N/A |
| Scoring Margin | UC San Diego | 2nd | 17.54 | N/A | N/A |
| Scoring Offense | Cal Poly | 19th | 82.08 | Owen Koonce | 16.94, 118th nationally |
| Steals Per Game | UC San Diego | 4th | 9.85 | Hayden Gray | 3.14, 2nd nationally |
| Three Point Attempts Per Game | Cal Poly | 3rd | 31.82 | Jarred Hyder | 8.45, N/A |
| Three Point Percentage | UC Santa Barbara | 17th | 38.07% | Stephan Swanson | 43.20%, 11th nationally |
| Three Point Percentage Defense | UC Santa Barbara | 17th | 31.09% | N/A | N/A |
| Three Pointers Per Game | Cal Poly | 3rd | 11.54 | Isaac Jessup | 3.06, 29th |
| Turnover Margin | UC San Diego | 1st | 7.20 | N/A | N/A |
| Turnovers Forced Per Game | UC San Diego | 8th | 15.91 | N/A | N/A |
| (Fewest) Turnovers Per Game | UC San Diego | 1st | 8.71 | N/A | N/A |
| Winning Percentage | UC San Diego | 6th | 85.71% | N/A | N/A |

=== Nationally Ranked Big West Players ===
This section lists the Big West Conference players who were ranked in the top 100 nationally in each of the individual statistical categories during the 2024–25 season. The school, ranking and specific statistics are recorded.

| Statistical Category | Player | Team | National Ranking | Statistic |
|---|---|---|---|---|
| Assist/Turnover Ratio | Hayden Gray | UC San Diego | 47th | 2.47 |
| Assists | Devin Askew | Long Beach State | Tied-95th | 145 |
| Assists | Stephan Swenson | UC Santa Barbara | Tied-98th | 144 |
| Assists Per Game | Devin Askew | Long Beach State | Tied-82nd | 4.47 |
| Assists Per Game | Stephan Swenson | UC Santa Barbara | Tied-99th | 4.36 |
| Blocks | Niko Rocak | UC Davis | Tied-36th | 58 |
| Blocks | Bent Leuchten | UC Irvine | Tied-70th | 50 |
| Blocks | Kyle Evans | UC Irvine | Tied-84th | 48 |
| Blocks Per Game | Niko Rocak | UC Davis | 33rd | 1.81 |
| Double Doubles | Bent Leuchten | UC Irvine | Tied-6th | 20 |
| Double Doubles | Keonte Jones | Cal State Northridge | Tied-18th | 14 |
| Double Doubles | Devin Tillis | UC Irvine | Tied-99th | 7 |
| Field Goal Attempts | TY Johnson | UC Davis | 4th | 591 |
| Field Goal Attempts | Barrington Hargress | UC Riverside | 7th | 568 |
| Field Goal Attempts | Jemel Jones | Cal State Bakersfield | Tied-34th | 496 |
| Field Goal Attempts | Devin Askew | Long Beach State | Tied-47th | 484 |
| Field Goal Attempts | Tyler McGhie | UC San Diego | 55th | 477 |
| Field Goal Percentage | Aniwaniwa Tait-Jones | UC San Diego | 24th | 57.60% |
| Field Goal Percentage | Devin Tillis | UC Irvine | 56th | 53.53% |
| Field Goal Percentage | Marcus Adams Jr. | Cal State Northridge | 64th | 52.62% |
| Field Goal Percentage | Owen Koonce | Cal Poly | 73rd | 51.69% |
| Field Goals | Barrington Hargress | UC Riverside | 11th | 252 |
| Field Goals | Jemel Jones | Cal State Bakersfield | 24th | 237 |
| Field Goals | TY Johnson | UC Davis | Tied-32nd | 229 |
| Field Goals | Aniwaniwa Tait-Jones | UC San Diego | 49th | 216 |
| Field Goals | Owen Koonce | Cal Poly | Tied-52nd | 214 |
| Field Goals | Marcus Adams Jr. | Cal State Northridge | 89th | 201 |
| Field Goals | Tyler McGhie | UC San Diego | 98th | 198 |
| Free Throw Attempts | Aniwaniwa Tait-Jones | UC San Diego | 1st | 297 |
| Free Throw Attempts | Bent Leuchten | UC Irvine | 4th | 261 |
| Free Throw Attempts | TY Johnson | UC Davis | 16th | 232 |
| Free Throw Percentage | Devin Askew | Long Beach State | 26th | 88.62% |
| Free Throw Percentage | Owen Koonce | Cal Poly | 32nd | 88.07% |
| Free Throw Percentage | Jemel Jones | Cal State Bakersfield | Tied-59th | 85.71% |
| Free Throw Percentage | Scotty Washington | Cal State Northridge | Tied-64th | 85.48% |
| Free Throw Percentage | Myles Che | UC Irvine | Tied-91st | 84.11% |
| Free Throws | Aniwaniwa Tait-Jones | UC San Diego | 3rd | 223 |
| Free Throws | Bent Leuchten | UC Irvine | 6th | 213 |
| Free Throws | TY Johnson | UC Davis | Tied-15th | 178 |
| Free Throws | Devin Askew | Long Beach State | Tied-52nd | 148 |
| Minutes Per Game | Devin Askew | Long Beach State | 34th | 36.00 |
| Points | Barrington Hargress | UC Riverside | 11th | 686 |
| Points | TY Johnson | UC Davis | 20th | 675 |
| Points | Aniwaniwa Tait-Jones | UC San Diego | 23rd | 670 |
| Points | Jemel Jones | Cal State Bakersfield | Tied-47th | 625 |
| Points | Devin Askew | Long Beach State | Tied-59th | 604 |
| Points | Bent Leuchten | UC Irvine | 66th | 599 |
| Points | Owen Koonce | Cal Poly | 71st | 593 |
| Points | Tyler McGhie | UC San Diego | Tied-85th | 582 |
| Points Per Game | TY Johnson | UC Davis | 6th | 21.09 |
| Points Per Game | Barrington Hargress | UC Riverside | 15th | 20.18 |
| Points Per Game | Aniwaniwa Tait-Jones | UC San Diego | 40th | 19.14 |
| Points Per Game | Jemel Jones | Cal State Bakersfield | 44th | 18.94 |
| Points Per Game | Devin Askew | Long Beach State | 49th | 18.87 |
| Rebounds | Bent Leuchten | UC Irvine | 9th | 354 |
| Rebounds | Keonte Jones | Cal State Northridge | 33rd | 298 |
| Rebounds | Devin Tillis | UC Irvine | 44th | 296 |
| Rebounds (Defensive) Per Game | Bent Leuchten | UC Irvine | 18th | 6.59 |
| Rebounds (Defensive) Per Game | Keonte Jones | Cal State Northridge | 28th | 6.27 |
| Rebounds (Defensive) Per Game | Devin Tillis | UC Irvine | 37th | 6.16 |
| Rebounds (Offensive) Per Game | Keonte Jones | Cal State Northridge | Tied-82nd | 2.76 |
| Rebounds Per Game | Bent Leuchten | UC Irvine | 29th | 9.08 |
| Rebounds Per Game | Keonte Jones | Cal State Northridge | 32nd | 9.03 |
| Rebounds Per Game | Devin Tillis | UC Irvine | 77th | 7.79 |
| Steals | Hayden Gray | UC San Diego | 1st | 110 |
| Steals | Chris Howell | UC San Diego | Tied-15th | 76 |
| Steals | TY Johnson | UC Davis | Tied-20th | 72 |
| Steals | Keonte Jones | Cal State Northridge | Tied-64th | 60 |
| Steals | Stephan Swenson | UC Santa Barbara | Tied-72nd | 59 |
| Steals Per Game | Hayden Gray | UC San Diego | 2nd | 3.14 |
| Steals Per Game | TY Johnson | UC Davis | Tied-25th | 2.25 |
| Steals Per Game | Chris Howell | UC San Diego | 23rd | 2.17 |
| Steals Per Game | Keonte Jones | Cal State Northridge | 66th | 1.82 |
| Steals Per Game | Stephan Swenson | UC Santa Barbara | Tied-75th | 1.79 |
| Three Pointers Attempted | Tyler McGhie | UC San Diego | 8th | 310 |
| Three Pointers Attempted | Jarred Hyder | Cal Poly | 24th | 279 |
| Three Pointers Attempted | Isaac Jessup | Cal Poly | Tied-93rd | 222 |
| Three Point Percentage | Stephan Swenson | UC Santa Barbara | 11th | 43.20% |
| Three Point Percentage | Isaac Jessup | Cal Poly | 15th | 42.79% |
| Three Point Percentage | Tyler McGhie | UC San Diego | 70th | 37.74% |
| Three Point Percentage | Jarred Hyder | Cal Poly | 94th | 35.48% |
| Three Pointers Per Game | Tyler McGhie | UC San Diego | 9th | 3.34 |
| Three Pointers Per Game | Isaac Jessup | Cal Poly | 29th | 3.06 |
| Three Pointers Per Game | Jarred Hyder | Cal Poly | Tied-34th | 3.00 |
| Three Pointers Per Game | Stephan Swenson | UC Santa Barbara | Tied-76th | 2.70 |
| Three Pointers Made | Tyler McGhie | UC San Diego | Tied-6th | 117 |
| Three Pointers Made | Jarred Hyder | Cal Poly | Tied-34th | 99 |
| Three Pointers Made | Isaac Jessup | Cal Poly | 46th | 95 |
| Three Pointers Made | Stephan Swenson | UC Santa Barbara | Tied-65th | 89 |

== Attendance ==
- Doesn't include exhibition and postseason matches.

| Team | Arena | Capacity | Game 1 | Game 2 | Game 3 | Game 4 | Game 5 | Game 6 | Game 7 | Game 8 | Game 9 | Game 10 | Total | Average | % of Capacity |
| Team | Arena | Capacity | Game 11 | Game 12 | Game 13 | Game 14 | Game 15 | Game 16 | Game 17 | Game 18 | Game 19 | Game 20 | Total | Average | % of Capacity |
| Cal Poly | Mott Athletics Center | 3,032 | 1,179 | 1,623 | 1,128 | 1,638 | 1,432 | 1,834 | 3,032 | 1,439 | 1,726 | 1,756 | 22,690 | 1,620 | 54.35% |
| Cal Poly | Mott Athletics Center | 3,032 | 1,568 | 1,548 | 1,503 | 1,284 | | | | | | | 22,690 | 1,620 | 54.35% |
| Cal State Bakersfield | Icardo Center | 3,497 | 3,071 | 720 | 2,057 | 589 | 732 | 705 | 797 | 850 | 1,088 | 1,905 | 17,617 | 1,174 | 33.58% |
| Cal State Bakersfield | Icardo Center | 3,497 | 1,091 | 876 | 627 | 1,351 | 1,158 | | | | | | 17,617 | 1,174 | 33.58% |
| Cal State Fullerton | Titan Gym | 4,000 | 857 | 2,576 | 458 | 405 | 468 | 427 | 412 | 521 | 513 | | 9,583 | 684 | 17.11% |
| Cal State Fullerton | Titan Gym | 4,000 | 373 | 452 | 433 | 1,013 | 675 | | | | | | 9,583 | 684 | 17.11% |
| Cal State Northridge | Premier America Credit Union Arena | 2,500 | 955 | 1,050 | 650 | 515 | 411 | 453 | 969 | 907 | 775 | 1,215 | 13,651 | 1,050 | 42.00% |
| Cal State Northridge | Premier America Credit Union Arena | 2,500 | 2,298 | 1,398 | 2,055 | | | | | | | | 13,651 | 1,050 | 42.00% |
| Hawai'i | Stan Sheriff Center | 10,300 | 4,221 | 4,580 | 4,313 | 4,433 | 8,948 | 4,089 | 4,614 | 5,049 | | 5,086 | 93,775 | 4,935 | 47.91% |
| Hawai'i | Stan Sheriff Center | 10,300 | 4,753 | 4,763 | 4,237 | 5,803 | 4,218 | 5,518 | 4,358 | 5,475 | 4,229 | 5,088 | 93,775 | 4,935 | 47.91% |
| Long Beach State | Walter Pyramid | 4,000 | 2,037 | 1,945 | 1,805 | 1,446 | 1,074 | 2,135 | 1,478 | 2,111 | 2,012 | 1,904 | 24,100 | 1,721 | 43.03% |
| Long Beach State | Walter Pyramid | 4,000 | 1,557 | 1,863 | 1,209 | 1,524 | | | | | | | 24,100 | 1,721 | 43.03% |
| UC Davis | University Credit Union Center | 6,003 | 1,027 | 1,113 | 1,274 | 2,891 | 875 | 907 | 1,372 | 2,263 | 1,478 | 1,221 | 23,959 | 1,711 | 28.50% |
| UC Davis | University Credit Union Center | 6,003 | 1,213 | 1,572 | 2,472 | 4,281 | | | | | | | 23,959 | 1,711 | 28.50% |
| UC Irvine | Bren Events Center | 5,000 | 1,862 | 2,123 | 2,074 | 3,316 | 3,106 | 2,678 | 3,148 | 2,325 | 5,000 | 2,781 | 35,675 | 2,972 | 59.45% |
| UC Irvine | Bren Events Center | 5,000 | 2,540 | 4,722 | | | | | | | | | 35,675 | 2,972 | 59.45% |
| UC Riverside | SRC Arena | 3,168 | 603 | 337 | 776 | 182 | 257 | 563 | 1,235 | 1,537 | 1,479 | 1,754 | 13,795 | 919 | 29.03% |
| UC Riverside | SRC Arena | 3,168 | 673 | 765 | 802 | 1,276 | 1,556 | | | | | | 13,795 | 919 | 29.03% |
| UC San Diego | Liontree Arena | 4,000 | 3,668 | 1,031 | 1,206 | 792 | 1,862 | 1,172 | 1,522 | 4,000 | 3,442 | 1,584 | 32,126 | 2,141 | 53.54% |
| UC San Diego | Liontree Arena | 4,000 | 1,754 | 2,003 | 3,084 | 2,019 | 2,987 | | | | | | 32,126 | 2,141 | 53.54% |
| UC Santa Barbara | The Thunderdome | 5,000 | 3,357 | 2,872 | 2,573 | 1,541 | 1,616 | 2,065 | 1,026 | 1,491 | 2,757 | 1,713 | 37,224 | 2,189 | 43.79% |
| UC Santa Barbara | The Thunderdome | 5,000 | 1,081 | 1,889 | 2,212 | 2,109 | 2,019 | 4,000 | 2,903 | | | | 37,224 | 2,189 | 43.79% |
