= 2024–25 Cal Poly Mustangs men's basketball team =

American college basketball season

2024–25 Cal Poly Mustangs men's basketball
- Conference: Big West Conference
- Record: 16–19 (8–12 Big West)
- Head coach: Mike DeGeorge (1st season)
- Assistant coaches: Kyle Bossier; Jesse Pruitt; Sam Walters; BJ Andrews; Ron DuBois
- Home arena: Mott Athletics Center (Capacity: 3,032)

2024–25 Big West men's basketball standings
	Conf.				Overall
Team	W		L	PCT	W		L	PCT
UC San Diego †	18	–	2	.900	30	–	5	.857
UC Irvine	17	–	3	.850	32	–	7	.821
UC Riverside	14	–	6	.700	21	–	13	.618
Cal State Northridge	14	–	6	.700	22	–	11	.667
UC Santa Barbara	11	–	9	.550	21	–	13	.618
UC Davis	9	–	11	.450	15	–	17	.469
Cal Poly	8	–	12	.400	16	–	19	.457
Cal State Bakersfield	8	–	12	.400	14	–	19	.424
Hawai'i	7	–	13	.350	15	–	16	.484
Long Beach State	3	–	17	.150	7	–	25	.219
Cal State Fullerton	1	–	19	.050	6	–	26	.188
† 2025 Big West tournament winner

The 2024–25 Cal Poly Mustangs men's basketball team represented California Polytechnic State University, San Luis Obispo during the 2024–25 NCAA Division I men's basketball season. The Mustangs, led by first-year head coach Mike DeGeorge, played their home games at the Mott Athletics Center in San Luis Obispo, California as members of the Big West Conference. With eight conference wins this season, this was Cal Poly's most since 2013 where they went 12–6.

== Previous season ==
The Mustangs finished the 2023–24 season 4–28, 0–20 in Big West play, to finish in 11th (last) place. Due to their last place finish, the Mustangs failed to make the Big West tournament, as only the top eight teams qualify.

On March 1, 2024, the school announced that head coach John Smith would be fired at the end of the season, ending his five-year tenure with the team. On March 26, the school announced that they would be hiring Colorado Mesa head coach Mike DeGeorge as the team's new head coach.

== Roster ==
2024–25 Cal Poly Mustangs men's basketball team
Players
Coaches

Pos.	#	Name	Height	Weight	Year	Previous school	Hometown
PG	0	Jarred Hyder	6 ft 3 in (1.91 m)	185 lb (84 kg)	GS	California	San Bernardino, CA
G	1	Logan McLaughlin	6 ft 2 in (1.88 m)	185 lb (84 kg)	RS Jr	New Mexico Junior College	Carrollton, TX
G	2	Mac Riniker	6 ft 5 in (1.96 m)	210 lb (95 kg)	GS	Colorado Mesa	Steamboat Springs, CO
PG	3	Hayden Jory	6 ft 0 in (1.83 m)	180 lb (82 kg)	Sr	Cabrillo High School	Lompoc, CA
G	4	Kieran Elliott	6 ft 6 in (1.98 m)	215 lb (98 kg)	So	West Texas A&M	Lubbock, TX
G	5	Guzman Vasilic	6 ft 4 in (1.93 m)	200 lb (91 kg)	RS Fr	Southeastern Oklahoma	Montevideo, Uruguay
PF	6	Paul Bizimana	6 ft 9 in (2.06 m)	215 lb (98 kg)	Sr	Eastern Illinois	Haltom City, TX
F	7	Eric Brown	6 ft 8 in (2.03 m)	225 lb (102 kg)	So	Mitty High School	Los Gatos, CA
PG	8	Jackson Mosley	5 ft 10 in (1.78 m)	170 lb (77 kg)	So	St. Francis High School	La Cañada, CA
G	9	Peter Bandelj	6 ft 4 in (1.93 m)	210 lb (95 kg)	Fr	Royal Crown Academy	Ljubljana, Slovenia
SG	10	Isaac Spears	6 ft 4 in (1.93 m)	170 lb (77 kg)	Sr	Montana State	Las Vegas, Nevada
G/F	11	Owen Koonce	6 ft 5 in (1.96 m)	195 lb (88 kg)	GS	Colorado Mesa	Lafayette, Colorado
G	14	Cayden Ward	6 ft 5 in (1.96 m)	185 lb (84 kg)	Fr	St. Mary's High School	Stockton, CA
PF	15	Aaron Jr. Price	6 ft 8 in (2.03 m)	225 lb (102 kg)	Jr	Liberty High School	Las Vegas, NV
F	16	Angelo Ghattas	6 ft 4 in (1.93 m)	205 lb (93 kg)	Fr	Serra High School	Redwood City, CA
G	21	Luka Tarlac	6 ft 7 in (2.01 m)	220 lb (100 kg)	Jr	Utah	Belgrade, Serbia
F	23	Ethan Menzies	6 ft 7 in (2.01 m)	215 lb (98 kg)	Sr	Colorado Mesa	Half Moon Bay, CA
G	40	Isaac Jessup	6 ft 2 in (1.88 m)	195 lb (88 kg)	Sr	Colorado Mesa	Spokane, WA

Head coach

- Mike DeGeorge (Monmouth (IL))

Assistant coach(es)

- Kyle Bossier (LSU)
- Jesse Pruitt (UC Davis)
- Sam Walters (Colorado Mesa)
- BJ Andrews (Clarion)
- Ron DuBois (Arizona State)

Legend

- (C) Team captain
- (S) Suspended
- (I) Ineligible
- (W) Walk-on
- Injured
- Current redshirt

Roster
Last update: October 27, 2024

== Schedule and results ==
Date time, TV	Rank^{#}	Opponent^{#}	Result	Record	High points	High rebounds	High assists	Site (attendance) city, state
Exhibition
October 25, 2024*; 12:00 p.m.		Caltech	W 110–53	–	13 – Bandelj	9 – Bandelj	4 – Tied	Mott Athletics Center (427); San Luis Obispo, CA
Regular season
November 5, 2024*; 7:00 p.m., ESPN+		at San Francisco	L 78–86	0–1	19 – Hyder	6 – Tied	4 – Jessup	Sobrato Center (2,073); San Francisco, CA
November 7, 2024*; 7:00 p.m., ACCNX/ESPN+		at California	L 73–91	0–2	20 – Jessup	6 – Elliott	4 – Menzies	Haas Pavilion (3,203); Berkeley, CA
November 10, 2024*; 2:00 p.m., ESPN+		Menlo	W 99–66	1–2	19 – Hyder	9 – Bandelj	5 – Tied	Mott Athletics Center (1,179); San Luis Obispo, CA
November 14, 2024*; 7:00 p.m., ESPN+		Seattle	W 75–71	2–2	14 – Tied	9 – Riniker	3 – Hyder	Mott Athletics Center (1,623); San Luis Obispo, CA
November 17, 2024*; 4:00 p.m., ESPN+		at Eastern Washington	W 82–78	3–2	19 – Koonce	7 – Tied	5 – Jessup	Reese Court (1,630); Cheney, WA
November 20, 2024*; 6:00 p.m., ESPN+		at Arizona State; Acrisure Classic on-campus game	L 89–93	3–3	27 – Hyder	6 – Koonce	4 – Riniker	Desert Financial Arena (6,294); Tempe, AZ
November 23, 2024*; 7:00 p.m., ESPN+		at Saint Mary's; Acrisure Classic on-campus game	L 66–80	3–4	16 – Koonce	5 – Koonce	5 – Riniker	University Credit Union Pavilion (3,500); Moraga, CA
November 26, 2024*; 7:00 p.m., ESPN+		Grambling State; Acrisure Classic on-campus game	W 82–79	4–4	17 – Tied	8 – Koonce	7 – Hyder	Mott Athletics Center (1,128); San Luis Obispo, CA
November 30, 2024*; 7:00 p.m., ACCNX		at Stanford	W 97–90	5–4	30 – Koonce	7 – Tied	5 – Jessup	Maples Pavilion (2,658); Stanford, CA
December 5, 2024; 6:00 p.m., ESPN+		at UC Davis	L 66–77	5–5 (0–1)	19 – Koonce	7 – Riniker	4 – Tarlac	University Credit Union Center (1,274); Davis, CA
December 7, 2024; 5:00 p.m., ESPN+		Cal State Northridge	L 91–102	5–6 (0–2)	25 – Koonce	10 – Koonce	6 – Riniker	Mott Athletics Center (1,638); San Luis Obispo, CA
December 14, 2024*; 7:00 p.m., MW Network		at San Jose State	L 100–107 ^{OT}	5–7	32 – Koonce	8 – Koonce	6 – Riniker	Provident Credit Union Event Center (2,134); San Jose, CA
December 17, 2024*; 7:00 p.m., ESPN+		Denver	W 95–94 ^{OT}	6–7	29 – Hyder	11 – Bandelj	4 – Tied	Mott Athletics Center (1,432); San Luis Obispo, CA
December 21, 2024*; 5:00 p.m.		at Omaha	L 82–86	6–8	22 – Hyder	7 – Jessup	4 – Tied	Baxter Arena (2,348); Omaha, NE
January 2, 2025; 5:00 p.m., ESPN+		UC Irvine	L 89–98 ^{OT}	6–9 (0–3)	16 – Price Jr.	8 – Price Jr.	7 – Hyder	Mott Athletics Center (1,834); San Luis Obispo, CA
January 4, 2025; 9:00 p.m., ESPN+		at Hawaii	L 55–68	6–10 (0–4)	15 – Koonce	6 – Hyder	4 – Riniker	Stan Sheriff Center (4,763); Honolulu, HI
January 9, 2025; 7:00 p.m., ESPN+		at UC San Diego	L 68–95	6–11 (0–5)	20 – Koonce	6 – Koonce	7 – Hyder	LionTree Arena (1,522); La Jolla, CA
January 11, 2025; 5:00 p.m., ESPN+		UC Santa Barbara; Rivalry	L 72–75	6–12 (0–6)	23 – Koonce	9 – Bandelj	3 – Tied	Mott Athletics Center (3,032); San Luis Obispo, CA
January 16, 2025; 7:00 p.m., ESPN+		UC Davis	L 54–65	6–13 (0–7)	18 – Riniker	7 – Riniker	4 – Hyder	Mott Athletics Center (1,439); San Luis Obispo, CA
January 18, 2025; 7:00 p.m., ESPN+		at UC Irvine	L 71–101	6–14 (0–8)	15 – Tied	8 – Ward	4 – Tied	Bren Events Center (2,678); Irvine, CA
January 25, 2025; 2:00 p.m., ESPN+		Long Beach State	W 78–69	7–14 (1–8)	19 – Hyder	6 – Tied	2 – Tied	Mott Athletics Center (1,726); San Luis Obispo, CA
January 30, 2025; 6:30 p.m., ESPN+		at Cal State Bakersfield	W 90–81	8–14 (2–8)	28 – Koonce	6 – Koonce	4 – Jessup	Icardo Center (1,905); Bakersfield, CA
February 1, 2025; 5:00 p.m., ESPN+		at UC Riverside	L 62–80	8–15 (2–9)	12 – Bandelj	10 – Riniker	6 – Riniker	SRC Arena (673); Riverside, CA
February 6, 2025; 7:00 p.m., ESPN+		Hawaii	W 79–63	9–15 (3–9)	20 – Koonce	7 – Price Jr.	4 – Tied	Mott Athletics Center (1,756); San Luis Obispo, CA
February 13, 2025; 7:00 p.m., ESPN+		at Cal State Fullerton	W 98–83	10–15 (4–9)	19 – Ward	8 – Bandelj	6 – Hyder	Titan Gym (433); Fullerton, CA
February 15, 2025; 5:00 p.m., ESPN+		at Cal State Northridge	L 85–89	10–16 (4–10)	21 – Koonce	10 – Koonce	7 – Hyder	Premier America Credit Union Arena (1,215); Northridge, CA
February 20, 2025; 7:00 p.m., ESPN+		UC San Diego	L 67–81	10–17 (4–11)	17 – Ward	9 – Ward	3 – Tied	Mott Athletics Center (1,568); San Luis Obispo, CA
February 22, 2025; 2:00 p.m., ESPN+		UC Riverside	W 112–100 ^{OT}	11–17 (5–11)	25 – Hyder	9 – Hyder	4 – Bandelj	Mott Athletics Center (1,548); San Luis Obispo, CA
February 27, 2025; 7:00 p.m., ESPN+		at UC Santa Barbara; Rivalry	L 77–96	11–18 (5–12)	23 – Koonce	7 – Bandelj	2 – Tied	The Thunderdome (4,000); Santa Barbara, CA
March 1, 2025; 2:00 p.m., ESPN+		Cal State Bakersfield	W 98–72	12–18 (6–12)	21 – Jessup	5 – Hyder	4 – Hyder	Mott Athletics Center (1,503); San Luis Obispo, CA
March 6, 2025; 7:00 p.m., ESPN+		Cal State Fullerton	W 100–61	13–18 (7–12)	21 – Koonce	6 – Tied	5 – Bandelj	Mott Athletics Center (1,284); San Luis Obispo, CA
March 8, 2025; 4:00 p.m., ESPN+		at Long Beach State	W 83–69	14–18 (8–12)	25 – Hyder	8 – Bandelj	4 – Tied	Walter Pyramid (1,524); Long Beach, CA
Big West tournament
March 12, 2025; 8:30 p.m., ESPN+	(7)	vs. (6) UC Davis; First round	W 86–76	15–18	18 – Koonce	5 – Tied	6 – Koonce	Lee's Family Forum (1,105); Henderson, NV
March 13, 2025; 8:30 p.m., ESPN+	(7)	vs. (3) UC Riverside; Quarterfinals	W 96–83	16–18	20 – Koonce	13 – Ward	4 – Jessup	Lee's Family Forum (1,185); Henderson, NV
March 14, 2025; 8:30 p.m., ESPN2	(7)	vs. (2) UC Irvine; Semifinals	L 78–96	16–19	22 – Riniker	6 – Riniker	5 – Bandelj	Lee's Family Forum (2,006); Henderson, NV
*Non-conference game. ^{#}Rankings from AP poll. (#) Tournament seedings in parentheses. All times are in Pacific.
