= 2024–25 UC Riverside Highlanders men's basketball team =

American college basketball season

2024–25 UC Riverside Highlanders men's basketball

NIT, First Round
- Conference: Big West Conference
- Record: 21–13 (14–6 Big West)
- Head coach: Mike Magpayo (5th season)
- Assistant coaches: Eddie Hill; Troy Hammel; Matt Hurwitz; Anthony Lorenzo
- Home arena: SRC Arena (Capacity: 3,168)

2024–25 Big West men's basketball standings
	Conf.				Overall
Team	W		L	PCT	W		L	PCT
UC San Diego †	18	–	2	.900	30	–	5	.857
UC Irvine	17	–	3	.850	32	–	7	.821
UC Riverside	14	–	6	.700	21	–	13	.618
Cal State Northridge	14	–	6	.700	22	–	11	.667
UC Santa Barbara	11	–	9	.550	21	–	13	.618
UC Davis	9	–	11	.450	15	–	17	.469
Cal Poly	8	–	12	.400	16	–	19	.457
Cal State Bakersfield	8	–	12	.400	14	–	19	.424
Hawai'i	7	–	13	.350	15	–	16	.484
Long Beach State	3	–	17	.150	7	–	25	.219
Cal State Fullerton	1	–	19	.050	6	–	26	.188
† 2025 Big West tournament winner

The 2024–25 UC Riverside Highlanders men's basketball team represented the University of California, Riverside during the 2024–25 NCAA Division I men's basketball season. The Highlanders, led by fifth-year head coach Mike Magpayo, played their home games at the SRC Arena in Riverside, California as members of the Big West Conference. They finished the season 21–13, 14–6 in Big West play to finish in a tie for third place. As the No. 3 seed in the Big West tournament, they were upset by Cal Poly in the quarterfinals. They received an invitation to the National Invitation Tournament. There they lost to Santa Clara in the first round.

On March 29, 2025, head coach Mike Magpayo left the team to take the head coaching position at Fordham. On May 1, the school announced that Cal State San Bernardino head coach Gus Argenal would be the team's new head coach.

== Previous season ==
The Highlanders finished the 2023–24 season 16–18, 10–10 in Big West play, to finish in a tie for fifth place. They defeated Cal State Bakersfield, before falling to eventual tournament champions Long Beach State in the quarterfinals of the Big West tournament.

== Roster ==
2024–25 UC Riverside Highlanders men's basketball team
Players
Coaches

Pos.	#	Name	Height	Weight	Year	Previous school	Hometown
G	0	Tyler Jones	6 ft 2 in (1.88 m)	—	Fr	Archbishop Mitty High School	Morgan Hill, CA
G	1	Gavin Davis	6 ft 6 in (1.98 m)	—	RS Jr	West Los Angeles College	Carson, CA
F	2	Kaleb Smith	6 ft 9 in (2.06 m)	—	RS So	Damien High School	Rancho Cucamonga, CA
G	3	Isaiah Moses	6 ft 1 in (1.85 m)	—	RS Jr	College of Southern Idaho	Anchorage, AK
F	4	Rikus Schulte	6 ft 9 in (2.06 m)	240 lb (109 kg)	So	Davidson	Münster, Germany
G	6	Jayden Mojica	6 ft 2 in (1.88 m)	—	So	San Gabriel Academy	El Sereno, CA
G	7	Parker Strauss	6 ft 4 in (1.93 m)	180 lb (82 kg)	RS Fr	Northwestern	Costa Mesa, CA
F	8	Abass Bodija	6 ft 10 in (2.08 m)	—	Fr	SWMP Pirates Academy	Brisbane, Australia
G/F	10	Niyi Olabode	6 ft 5 in (1.96 m)	—	Sr	Miramonte High School	Orinda, CA
G/F	11	Nate Pickens	6 ft 3 in (1.91 m)	—	Jr	Dream City Christian	El Mirage, AZ
C	12	Jack Whitbourn	6 ft 10 in (2.08 m)	—	Fr	Melbourne Tigers	Melbourne, Australia
F	13	David Manea	6 ft 6 in (1.98 m)	—	Fr	Prolific Prep	Irvine, CA
C	21	Joel Armotrading	6 ft 10 in (2.08 m)	225 lb (102 kg)	Sr	Cal Poly	London, England
F	22	Luke Turner	6 ft 7 in (2.01 m)	195 lb (88 kg)	Sr	Wofford	Temecula, CA
G	24	Barrington Hargress	6 ft 0 in (1.83 m)	195 lb (88 kg)	RS So	Heritage Christian School	Inglewood, CA

Head coach

- Mike Magpayo (UC Santa Barbara)

Assistant coach(es)

- Eddie Hill (Washington State)
- Troy Hammel (Merrimack)
- Matt Hurwitz (UCLA)
- Anthony Lorenzo (Rutgers)

Legend

- (C) Team captain
- (S) Suspended
- (I) Ineligible
- (W) Walk-on
- Injured
- Current redshirt

Roster
Last update: October 28, 2024

== Schedule and results ==
Date time, TV	Rank^{#}	Opponent^{#}	Result	Record	High points	High rebounds	High assists	Site (attendance) city, state
Exhibition
October 25, 2024*; 7:00 p.m.		Cal State San Marcos	W 89–61	–	21 – Smith	11 – Smith	7 – Moses	SRC Arena (300); Riverside, CA
Regular season
November 4, 2024*; 7:30 p.m., BTN+		at Oregon	L 76–91	0–1	20 – Hargress	6 – Olabode	7 – Moses	Matthew Knight Arena (5,494); Eugene, OR
November 8, 2024*; 6:00 p.m., ESPN+		at BYU	L 80–86	0–2	20 – Smith	8 – Armotrading	5 – Hargress	Marriott Center (17,381); Provo, UT
November 12, 2024*; 7:00 p.m., ESPN+		at California Baptist	W 70–69	1–2	25 – Hargress	13 – Whitbourn	5 – Moses	Fowler Events Center (3,607); Riverside, CA
November 14, 2024*; 7:00 p.m., ESPN+		La Sierra	W 79–51	2–2	21 – Smith	16 – Whitbourn	5 – Hargress	SRC Arena (603); Riverside, CA
November 19, 2024*; 7:00 p.m., ESPN+		at Santa Clara; Acrisure Invitational on-campus game	L 54–96	2–3	11 – tied	6 – Armotrading	7 – Hargress	Leavey Center (1,230); Santa Clara, CA
November 22, 2024*; 6:00 p.m., MW Network		at Colorado State; Acrisure Invitational on-campus game	W 77–75 ^{OT}	3–3	31 – Hargress	8 – Schulte	6 – Hargress	Moby Arena (4,713); Fort Collins, CO
November 24, 2024*; 2:00 p.m., ESPN+		Alcorn State; Acrisure Invitational on-campus game	W 69–52	4–3	20 – Hargress	13 – Armotrading	4 – Smith	SRC Arena (337); Riverside, CA
November 30, 2024*; 2:00 p.m., ESPN+		at Idaho	L 68–80	4–4	13 – Moses	5 – Smith	3 – tied	ICCU Arena (1,567); Moscow, ID
December 5, 2024; 7:00 p.m., SSN/ESPN+		at Cal State Northridge	W 68–64	5–4 (1–0)	27 – Hargress	5 – tied	4 – Pickens	Premier America Credit Union Arena (1,050); Northridge, CA
December 7, 2024; 5:00 p.m., ESPN+		Cal State Fullerton	W 75–68	6–4 (2–0)	20 – Hargress	9 – Armotrading	4 – Smith	SRC Arena (776); Riverside, CA
December 15, 2024*; 2:00 p.m., ESPN+		St. Francis (IL)	W 78–55	7–4	16 – Armotrading	9 – Smith	5 – Pickens	SRC Arena (182); Riverside, CA
December 18, 2024*; 7:00 p.m., ESPN+		Montana State	W 83–80	8–4	22 – Hargress	8 – tied	10 – Hargress	SRC Arena (257); Riverside, CA
December 21, 2024*; 12:00 p.m., MW Network		at UNLV	L 53–66	8–5	17 – Hargress	6 – tied	3 – Pickens	Thomas & Mack Center (4,105); Paradise, NV
December 29, 2024*; 2:00 p.m., ESPN+		St. Thomas (MN)	W 81–79 ^{OT}	9–5	24 – Hargress	11 – Armotrading	4 – Pickens	SRC Arena (563); Riverside, CA
January 2, 2025; 7:00 p.m., ESPN+		at Long Beach State	W 76–60	10–5 (3–0)	22 – Moses	10 – Pickens	4 – Hargress	Walter Pyramid (2,135); Long Beach, CA
January 4, 2025; 7:00 p.m., ESPN+		at UC Irvine	L 57–81	10–6 (3–1)	20 – Hargress	10 – Olabode	3 – Pickens	Bren Events Center (3,316); Irvine, CA
January 9, 2025; 7:00 p.m., ESPN+		Hawaii	L 76–83	10–7 (3–2)	26 – Moses	8 – Schulte	4 – Moses	SRC Arena (1,235); Riverside, CA
January 16, 2025; 7:00 p.m., ESPN+		at UC Santa Barbara	L 63–66	10–8 (3–3)	18 – Hargress	7 – Smith	8 – Hargress	The Thunderdome (1,713); Santa Barbara, CA
January 18, 2025; 5:00 p.m., ESPN+		UC San Diego	W 85–81	11–8 (4–3)	40 – Hargress	14 – Armotrading	10 – Moses	SRC Arena (1,537); Riverside, CA
January 23, 2025; 7:00 p.m., ESPN+		UC Irvine	W 84–80 ^{OT}	12–8 (5–3)	20 – Hargress	8 – Armotrading	8 – Hargress	SRC Arena (1,479); Riverside, CA
January 25, 2025; 6:30 p.m., ESPN+		at Cal State Bakersfield	W 83–79	13–8 (6–3)	22 – Hargress	9 – Armotrading	3 – Moses	Icardo Center (1,088); Bakersfield, CA
January 30, 2025; 7:00 p.m., ESPN+		UC Davis	W 60–58	14–8 (7–3)	14 – Smith	9 – Armotrading	5 – Hargress	SRC Arena (1,754); Riverside, CA
February 1, 2025; 5:00 p.m., ESPN+		Cal Poly	W 80–62	15–8 (8–3)	20 – Hargress	8 – Whitbourn	6 – Moses	SRC Arena (673); Riverside, CA
February 6, 2025; 7:00 p.m., ESPN+		at UC San Diego	L 71–91	15–9 (8–4)	25 – Moses	5 – Armotrading	4 – Pickens	LionTree Arena (1,754); La Jolla, CA
February 8, 2025; 5:00 p.m., ESPN+		Cal State Bakersfield	W 69–64	16–9 (9–4)	19 – Hargress	9 – Armotrading	4 – Moses	SRC Arena (765); Riverside, CA
February 13, 2025; 6:00 p.m., ESPN+		at UC Davis	L 74–75	16–10 (9–5)	15 – tied	6 – Armotrading	3 – tied	University Credit Union Center (1,221); Davis, CA
February 15, 2025; 5:00 p.m., ESPN+		UC Santa Barbara	W 81–69	17–10 (10–5)	26 – Hargress	8 – Olabode	6 – Hargress	SRC Arena (802); Riverside, CA
February 20, 2025; 7:00 p.m., ESPN+		Long Beach State	W 87–66	18–10 (11–5)	27 – Pickens	7 – Armotrading	5 – Hargress	SRC Arena (1,276); Riverside, CA
February 22, 2025; 2:00 p.m., ESPN+		at Cal Poly	L 100–112 ^{OT}	18–11 (11–6)	25 – Hargress	8 – Armotrading	4 – Moses	Mott Athletics Center (1,548); San Luis Obispo, CA
February 27, 2025; 9:00 p.m., ESPN+		at Hawaii	W 82–76	19–11 (12–6)	25 – Hargress	7 – Moses	4 – Moses	Stan Sheriff Center (4,229); Honolulu, HI
March 6, 2025; 7:00 p.m., ESPN+		Cal State Northridge	W 94–79	20–11 (13–6)	32 – Hargress	11 – Olabode	8 – Moses	SRC Arena (1,556); Riverside, CA
March 8, 2025; 6:00 p.m., ESPN+		at Cal State Fullerton	W 64–59	21–11 (14–6)	22 – Hargress	10 – Whitbourn	4 – Hargress	Titan Gym (675); Fullerton, CA
Big West tournament
March 13, 2025; 8:30 p.m., ESPN+	(3)	vs. (7) Cal Poly; Quarterfinals	L 83–96	21–12	30 – Moses	11 – Smith	5 – Hargress	Lee's Family Forum; Henderson, NV
NIT
March 18, 2025; 8:00 p.m., ESPNU		at (2) Santa Clara; First Round – Irvine Region	L 62–101	21–13	15 – Pickens	4 – tied	5 – Hargress	Leavey Center (672); Santa Clara, CA
*Non-conference game. ^{#}Rankings from AP poll. (#) Tournament seedings in parentheses. All times are in Pacific.
