= 2024–25 UC Irvine Anteaters men's basketball team =

American college basketball season

2024–25 UC Irvine Anteaters men's basketball

Western Slam Champions

NIT, Runner-Up
- Conference: Big West Conference
- Record: 32–7 (17–3 Big West)
- Head coach: Russell Turner (15th season)
- Assistant coaches: Michael Wilder (9th season); Ali Ton (2nd season); Sean O'Donnell (1st season); Patrick Scully (1st season); Julius Smith (1st season)
- Home arena: Bren Events Center (Capacity: 5,000)

2024–25 Big West men's basketball standings
	Conf.				Overall
Team	W		L	PCT	W		L	PCT
UC San Diego †	18	–	2	.900	30	–	5	.857
UC Irvine	17	–	3	.850	32	–	7	.821
UC Riverside	14	–	6	.700	21	–	13	.618
Cal State Northridge	14	–	6	.700	22	–	11	.667
UC Santa Barbara	11	–	9	.550	21	–	13	.618
UC Davis	9	–	11	.450	15	–	17	.469
Cal Poly	8	–	12	.400	16	–	19	.457
Cal State Bakersfield	8	–	12	.400	14	–	19	.424
Hawai'i	7	–	13	.350	15	–	16	.484
Long Beach State	3	–	17	.150	7	–	25	.219
Cal State Fullerton	1	–	19	.050	6	–	26	.188
† 2025 Big West tournament winner

The 2024–25 UC Irvine Anteaters men's basketball team represented the University of California, Irvine in the 2024–25 NCAA Division I men's basketball season. They played their home games at the Bren Events Center in Irvine, California as a member of the Big West Conference. The Anteaters were led by 15th-year head coach Russell Turner.

This year the Anteaters matched their best start since the 1980–81 season, as both teams won nine straight to open the season. This year, the Anteaters also have won the most games on the road in team history during the regular season (14), and led the nation with that number.

This year marks the first time in program history where the Anteaters have been ranked number one in the Mid-Major College Basketball Insider Poll. Additionally, UC Irvine received votes in both the AP Top 25 and the USA Today Coaches Poll for multiple weeks. The team ranked twenty-fourth in the first NCAA NET Rankings of the 2024–25 season, the highest ranking in program history. Despite their 28 regular season wins, they were not invited to the NCAA tournament, and thus received a #1 seed in the NIT tournament. Only two teams have ever finished the regular season with 28 wins and been excluded from March Madness, the other team being Indiana State. Ironically, both teams finished runner-up in the NIT. This is the third consecutive year UC Irvine has been invited to the tournament. This is the first time UC Irvine has won a National Invitation Tournament game since 1986, and the furthest they've ever gotten, finishing runner-up to Chattanooga.

== Previous season ==
The 2023–24 Anteaters team finished 24–10, including a 17–3 conference record. They were ousted in the Big West Tournament by Long Beach State, losing 79-83.

== Offseason ==
=== Departures ===
Six players from the 2023–24 roster departed Irvine, including three graduates and three transfers. Derin Saran transferred to Stanford, while brothers Hayden and Carter Welling transferred to Utah Valley.

Departures
Name	Number	Pos.	Height	Weight	Year	Hometown	Reason for departure
Dylan Thoerner	0	G	6'6"	200	Graduate	Irvine, CA	Graduated
Derin Saran	1	G	6'4"	190	Freshman	Istanbul, Turkey	Transferred to Stanford
Pierre Crockrell II	3	G	6'0"	180	Fifth-year	Tacoma, WA	Graduated
Hayden Welling	13	F	6'9"	205	Sophomore	Draper, UT	Transferred to Utah Valley
Carter Welling	22	F	6'10"	225	Freshman	Draper, UT	Transferred to Utah Valley
Dean Keeler	31	F	6'11"	240	Fifth-year	Westminster, CA	Graduated

=== Incoming transfers ===
On July 19, 2024, Irvine announced the addition of Kyle Evans to the roster, a forward from Aliso Viejo, California, transferring after two seasons with Colorado State. Irvine had previously recruited Evans out of high school. On July 24, the team announced the addition of Myles Che, a guard from Los Angeles who spent his freshman year at Chattanooga. Head coach Russell Turner stated that Che was Irvine's highest-priority guard target on the transfer market.

Incoming transfers
Name	Number	Pos.	Height	Weight	Year	Hometown	Previous School
Kyle Evans	14	F	6'10"	215	Junior	Aliso Viejo, CA	Colorado State
Myles Che	77	G	6'2"	190	Sophomore	Los Angeles, CA	Chattanooga

=== Recruits ===
College recruiting
Name	Hometown	School	Height	Weight	Commit date
Torian Lee; G	Surrey, BC, Canada	Orangeville Prep	5 ft 10 in (1.78 m)	158 lb (72 kg)	
Torian Lee; G	Recruit ratings: No ratings found				
Berk Can Akin; G	Istanbul, Turkey	Ozluce Sinav Koleji	6 ft 4 in (1.93 m)	185 lb (84 kg)	
Berk Can Akin; G	Recruit ratings: No ratings found				
Jovan Jester Jr. G	Pasadena, CA	Pasadena HS	6 ft 3 in (1.91 m)	180 lb (82 kg)	
Jovan Jester Jr. G	Recruit ratings: No ratings found				
Tishan Ahir; G	La Cañada Flintridge, CA	Crescenta Valley HS	6 ft 0 in (1.83 m)	150 lb (68 kg)	
Tishan Ahir; G	Recruit ratings: No ratings found				
Overall recruit ranking:
Note: In many cases, Scout, Rivals, 247Sports, On3, and ESPN may conflict in their listings of height and weight.; In these cases, the average was taken. ESPN grades are on a 100-point scale.; Sources:

== Roster ==
2022–23 UC Irvine Anteaters men's basketball team
Players
Coaches

Pos.	#	Name	Height	Weight	Year	Previous school	Hometown
G	1	Torian Lee	5 ft 10 in (1.78 m)	158 lb (72 kg)	Fr	Orangeville Prep	Surrey, British Columbia, Canada
G	2	Justin Hohn	6 ft 2 in (1.88 m)	185 lb (84 kg)	GS	Tea High School	Sioux Falls, South Dakota
G	4	Andre Henry (injured)	6 ft 4 in (1.93 m)	185 lb (84 kg)	GS	Saint Francis High School	La Cañada Flintridge, California
F	5	Ben Egbo	6 ft 4 in (1.93 m)	200 lb (91 kg)	RS Fr	Perry High School	Gilbert, Arizona
G	7	Berk Can Akin	6 ft 4 in (1.93 m)	185 lb (84 kg)	Fr	Ozluce Sinav Koleji	Istanbul, Turkey
G	9	Jovan Jester Jr. (redshirt)	6 ft 3 in (1.91 m)	180 lb (82 kg)	RS Fr	Pasadena High School	Pasadena, California
G	10	Ofure Ujadughele (W)	6 ft 4 in (1.93 m)	215 lb (98 kg)	GS	Chino Hills High School	Long Beach, California
F	11	Devin Tillis	6 ft 6 in (1.98 m)	215 lb (98 kg)	RS Sr	UNLV	Los Angeles, California
F	14	Kyle Evans	6 ft 10 in (2.08 m)	215 lb (98 kg)	Jr	Colorado State	Aliso Viejo, California
C	15	Bent Leuchten	7 ft 1 in (2.16 m)	265 lb (120 kg)	Sr	Josef-Effner Gymnasium	Karlsfeld, Bavaria, Germany
G	21	Langston Redfield (injured) (W)	6 ft 4 in (1.93 m)	185 lb (84 kg)	RS Jr	Capistrano Valley High School	Mission Viejo, California
G	24	Jurian Dixon	6 ft 4 in (1.93 m)	195 lb (88 kg)	RS Fr	St. Augustine High School	San Diego, California
G	27	Tishan Ahir	6 ft 0 in (1.83 m)	150 lb (68 kg)	Fr	Crescenta Valley High School	La Cañada Flintridge, California
F/C	33	Elijah Chol	6 ft 11 in (2.11 m)	185 lb (84 kg)	RS So	Forsyth Central High School	Cumming, Georgia
F	43	Akiva McBirney-Griffin (injured)	6 ft 10 in (2.08 m)	215 lb (98 kg)	RS So	St John's College, Hamilton	Hamilton, New Zealand
G	77	Myles Che	6 ft 2 in (1.88 m)	190 lb (86 kg)	So	Chattanooga	Los Angeles, California

Head coach

- Russell Turner (Hampden–Sydney)

Assistant coach(es)

- Michael Wilder (UC Irvine)
- Sean O'Donnell (UC Irvine)
- Ali Ton (Davidson)
- Patrick Scully (Oregon)
- Julius Smith (Jessup)

Legend

- (C) Team captain
- (S) Suspended
- (I) Ineligible
- (W) Walk-on
- Injured
- Current redshirt

Roster

== Schedule and results ==
Date time, TV	Rank^{#}	Opponent^{#}	Result	Record	High points	High rebounds	High assists	Site (attendance) city, state
Exhibition
October 30, 2024*; 7:00 pm, ESPN+		Vanguard	W 81–58	–	14 – Tied	9 – Tillis	4 – Tied	Bren Events Center (1,375); Irvine, CA
Regular season
November 4, 2024*; 8:00 pm, ESPN+		Chapman	W 82–52	1–0	19 – Leuchten	7 – Tied	3 – Tied	Bren Events Center (1,862); Irvine, CA
November 8, 2024*; 7:00 pm, ESPN+		at Loyola Marymount	W 66–51	2–0	17 – Henry	11 – Leuchten	4 – Tied	Gersten Pavilion (1,144); Los Angeles, CA
November 10, 2024*; 11:00 am, ESPN+		at Northern Iowa	W 80–60	3–0	18 – Leuchten	9 – Tillis	3 – Hohn	McLeod Center (3,513); Cedar Falls, IA
November 16, 2024*; 7:00 pm, ESPN+		Pepperdine	W 80–62	4–0	25 – Tillis	15 – Leuchten	4 – High	Bren Events Center (2,123); Irvine, CA
November 22, 2024*; 6:00 pm, ESPN+		at Weber State	W 93–87	5–0	29 – Leuchten	11 – Tied	6 – Hohn	Dee Events Center (3,559); Ogden, UT
November 28, 2024*; 4:30 pm, ESPN+		vs. Kennesaw State; Western Slam	W 76–59	6–0	15 – Tied	6 – Tied	6 – Hohn	Enmax Centre (704); Lethbridge, AB, Canada
November 29, 2024*; 6:30 pm, ESPN+		vs. Kent State; Western Slam	W 51–39	7–0	17 – Leuchten	11 – Tillis	4 – Hohn	Enmax Centre (1,478); Lethbridge, AB, Canada
November 30, 2024*; 6:30 pm, ESPN+		vs. Towson; Western Slam	W 67–60	8–0	25 – Tillis	7 – Tied	4 – Hohn	Enmax Centre (1,603); Lethbridge, AB, Canada
December 5, 2024; 7:00 pm, ESPN+		Cal State Bakersfield	W 82–66	9–0 (1–0)	19 – Hohn	7 – Tied	8 – Hohn	Bren Events Center (2,074); Irvine, CA
December 14, 2024*; 2:00 pm, ESPN+		at Oregon State	L 55–67	9–1	10 – Hohn	7 – Tillis	3 – Che	Gill Coliseum (2,740); Corvallis, Oregon
December 19, 2024*; 4:30 pm, ESPN+		at Belmont	W 92–84	10–1	23 – Leuchten	15 – Leuchten	4 – Hohn	Curb Event Center (1,732); Nashville, TN
December 21, 2024*; 11:30 am, ESPN+		at Duquesne	L 54–70	10–2	9 – Che	7 – Tillis	2 – Tied	UPMC Cooper Fieldhouse (2,010); Pittsburgh, PA
December 30, 2024*; 7:00 pm, ESPN+		at California Baptist	W 71–63	11–2	20 – Leuchten	10 – Leuchten	4 – Che	Fowler Events Center (2,720); Riverside, CA
January 2, 2025; 5:00 pm, ESPN+		at Cal Poly	W 98–89 ^{OT}	12–2 (2–0)	25 – Tillis	11 – Leuchten	4 – Tillis	Mott Athletics Center (1,834); San Luis Obispo, CA
January 4, 2025; 7:00 pm, ESPN+		UC Riverside	W 81–57	13–2 (3–0)	17 – Hohn	8 – Tillis	7 – Che	Bren Events Center (3,316); Irvine, CA
January 9, 2025; 7:00 pm, ESPN+		at Cal State Northridge	W 77–67	14–2 (4–0)	17 – Leuchten	12 – Leuchten	5 – Hohn	Premier America Credit Union Arena (453); Northridge, CA
January 11, 2025; 7:00 pm, ESPNU		at UC San Diego	W 60–52	15–2 (5–0)	23 – Leuchten	13 – Leuchten	4 – Che	LionTree Arena (4,000); San Diego, CA
January 16, 2025; 7:00 pm, ESPN+		Cal State Fullerton	W 82–62	16–2 (6–0)	21 – Leuchten	11 – Evans	5 – Tied	Bren Events Center (3,106); Irvine, CA
January 18, 2025; 7:00 pm, ESPN+		Cal Poly	W 101–71	17–2 (7–0)	21 – Tillis	8 – Leuchten	6 – Che	Bren Events Center (2,678); Irvine, CA
January 23, 2025; 7:00 pm, ESPN+		at UC Riverside	L 80–84 ^{OT}	17–3 (7–1)	20 – Che	12 – Leuchten	3 – Che	SRC Arena (1,479); Riverside, CA
January 25, 2025; 7:00 pm, ESPN+		Hawaii	W 71–55	18–3 (8–1)	17 – Che	13 – Tillis	5 – Che	Bren Events Center (3,148); Irvine, CA
January 30, 2025; 7:00 pm, ESPN+		at Long Beach State; Black and Blue Rivalry	W 80–75 ^{OT}	19–3 (9–1)	20 – Che	10 – Leuchten	6 – Hohn	Walter Pyramid (2,012); Long Beach, CA
February 1, 2025; 1:00 pm, ESPN+		UC Davis	W 73–66	20–3 (10–1)	21 – Leuchten	13 – Leuchten	6 – Leuchten	Bren Events Center (2,325); Irvine, CA
February 8, 2025; 7:00 pm, ESPNU		UC San Diego; Operation Invade Irvine	L 67–85	20–4 (10–2)	23 – Leuchten	9 – Tillis	4 – Tillis	Bren Events Center (5,000); Irvine, CA
February 13, 2025; 8:00 pm, ESPNU		UC Santa Barbara	W 62–60	21–4 (11–2)	22 – Tillis	8 – Tillis	4 – Tied	Bren Events Center (2,781); Irvine, CA
February 15, 2025; 9:00 pm, ESPN+		at Hawaii	W 66–49	22–4 (12–2)	21 – Leuchten	7 – Leuchten	4 – Hohn	Stan Sheriff Center (5,475); Honolulu, HI
February 20, 2025; 7:00 pm, ESPN+		Cal State Northridge	L 72–84	22–5 (12–3)	20 – Lee	6 – Tillis	6 – Hohn	Bren Events Center (2,540); Irvine, CA
February 22, 2025; 6:30 pm, ESPN+		at Cal State Bakersfield	W 73–64	23–5 (13–3)	16 – Dixon	11 – Leuchten	5 – Dixon	Icardo Center (1,351); Bakersfield, CA
February 27, 2025; 7:00 pm, ESPN+		at Cal State Fullerton	W 76–51	24–5 (14–3)	21 – Dixon	10 – Leuchten	5 – Che	Titan Gym (1,013); Fullerton, CA
March 1, 2025; 7:00 pm, ESPN+		Long Beach State; Homecoming	W 70–60	25–5 (15–3)	19 – Che	12 – Leuchten	5 – Tillis	Bren Events Center (4,722); Irvine, CA
March 6, 2025; 6:00 pm, ESPN+		at UC Davis	W 88–59	26–5 (16–3)	31 – Che	12 – Leuchten	5 – Ujadughele	University Credit Union Center (2,472); Davis, CA
March 8, 2025; 7:00 pm, ESPN+		at UC Santa Barbara	W 97–88	27–5 (17–3)	23 – Dixon	10 – Leuchten	9 – Hohn	The Thunderdome (2,903); Santa Barbara, CA
Big West tournament
March 14, 2025; 8:30 pm, ESPN2	(2)	vs. (7) Cal Poly; Semifinals	W 96–78	28–5	21 – Leuchten	10 – Leuchten	6 – Tillis	Lee's Family Forum (2,006); Henderson, NV
March 15, 2025; 6:40 pm, ESPN2	(2)	vs. (1) UC San Diego; Championship	L 61–75	28–6	18 – Hohn	7 – Tied	8 – Tillis	Lee's Family Forum (2,632); Henderson, NV
NIT
March 19, 2025; 7:00 p.m., ESPN+	(1)	Northern Colorado; First round – Irvine Region	W 82–72	29–6	24 – Tillis	10 – Leuchten	5 – Hohn	Bren Events Center (1,241); Irvine, CA
March 23, 2025; 6:00 p.m., ESPN+	(1)	Jacksonville State; Second round – Irvine Region	W 66–61	30–6	22 – Hohn	9 – Tillis	3 – Tied	Bren Events Center (1,304); Irvine, CA
March 26, 2025*; 6:00 p.m., ESPN2	(1)	UAB; Quarterfinals – Irvine Region	W 81–77 ^{OT}	31–6	22 – Tillis	11 – Tillis	5 – Tied	Bren Events Center (1,378); Irvine, CA
April 1, 2025*; 4:00 p.m., ESPN	(1)	vs. (2) North Texas; Semifinals	W 69–67	32–6	16 – Tillis	11 – Tillis	8 – Hohn	Hinkle Fieldhouse (3,288); Indianapolis, IN
April 3, 2025*; 6:00 p.m., ESPN	(1)	vs. Chattanooga; Championship	L 84–85 ^{OT}	32–7	19 – Tillis	11 – Leuchten	4 – Hohn	Hinkle Fieldhouse (2,825); Indianapolis, IN
*Non-conference game. ^{#}Rankings from AP Poll. (#) Tournament seedings in parentheses.

== Rankings ==
Ranking movements Legend: ██ Increase in ranking ██ Decrease in ranking — = Not ranked RV = Received votes
	Week																				
Poll	Pre	1	2	3	4	5	6	7	8	9	10	11	12	13	14	15	16	17	18	19	Final
AP	—	—	—	—	RV	—	—	—	—	—	RV	RV	—	—	—	—	—	—	—	—	—
Coaches	—	—	—	—	RV	RV	—	—	—	—	RV	RV	RV	RV	—	—	—	—	—	—	—

== Awards and honors ==
=== Regular season ===
Weekly honors
Honors	Player	Position	Date awarded	Ref.
Big West Player of the Week	Bent Leuchten	C	January 13, 2025	

=== Postseason ===
All five of Irvine's regular starters received varying conference honors, with Bent Leuchten earning a first-team selection at center and Jurian Dixon being named the freshman of the year after redshirting in his first season with the Anteaters.

Postseason honors
Honors	Honoree
Big West Freshman of the Year	Jurian Dixon
All-Big West First Team	Bent Leuchten
All-Big West Second Team	Devin Tillis
All-Big West Honorable Mention	Myles Che
All-Big West Honorable Mention	Justin Hohn
