= 2024–25 Cal State Northridge Matadors men's basketball team =

American college basketball season

2024–25 Cal State Northridge Matadors men's basketball
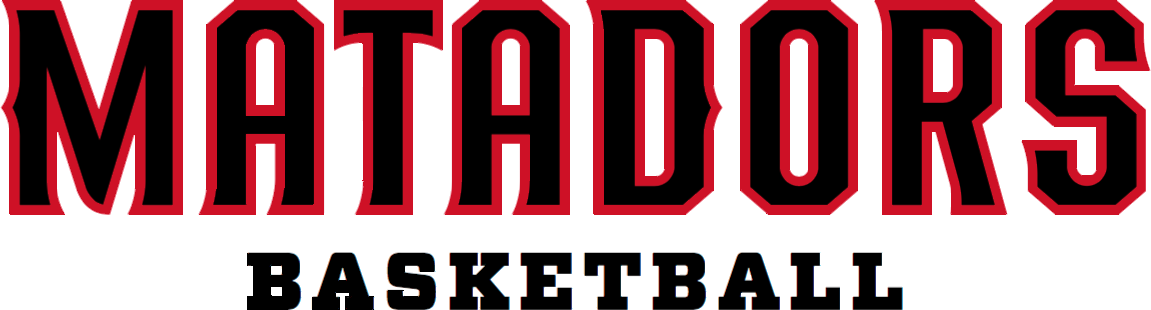

NIT, first round
- Conference: Big West Conference
- Record: 22–11 (14–6 Big West)
- Head coach: Andy Newman (2nd season)
- Assistant coaches: Scott Cutley; CJ Killin; Brandon Shingles
- Home arena: Premier America Credit Union Arena

2024–25 Big West men's basketball standings
	Conf.				Overall
Team	W		L	PCT	W		L	PCT
UC San Diego †	18	–	2	.900	30	–	5	.857
UC Irvine	17	–	3	.850	32	–	7	.821
UC Riverside	14	–	6	.700	21	–	13	.618
Cal State Northridge	14	–	6	.700	22	–	11	.667
UC Santa Barbara	11	–	9	.550	21	–	13	.618
UC Davis	9	–	11	.450	15	–	17	.469
Cal Poly	8	–	12	.400	16	–	19	.457
Cal State Bakersfield	8	–	12	.400	14	–	19	.424
Hawai'i	7	–	13	.350	15	–	16	.484
Long Beach State	3	–	17	.150	7	–	25	.219
Cal State Fullerton	1	–	19	.050	6	–	26	.188
† 2025 Big West tournament winner

The 2024–25 Cal State Northridge Matadors men's basketball team represented California State University, Northridge during the 2024–25 NCAA Division I men's basketball season. The Matadors, led by second-year head coach Andy Newman, played their home games at the Premier America Credit Union Arena located in Northridge, California as members of the Big West Conference.

They finished the season 22–11, 14–6 in Big West play, to finish in a tie for third place. In the Big West tournament they were defeated by UC Santa Barbara in the quarterfinals, and in the first-ever appearance in the NIT, lost to Stanford in the first round.

== Previous season ==
The Matadors finished the 2023–24 season 19–15, 9–11 in Big West play, to finish in a tie for seventh place. In the Big West tournament, they defeated UC Santa Barbara in the first round before falling to Hawaii in the quarterfinals.

== Roster ==
2024–25 Cal State Northridge Matadors men's basketball team
Players
Coaches

Pos.	#	Name	Height	Weight	Year	Previous school	Hometown
G	0	Tyler Beard	6 ft 2 in (1.88 m)	180 lb (82 kg)	Sr	Pacific	Chicago, IL
F	1	Noah Williams	6 ft 8 in (2.03 m)	180 lb (82 kg)	Fr	Sierra Canyon School	Gardena, CA
G	2	Joseph Barrio	6 ft 1 in (1.85 m)	170 lb (77 kg)	So	Mira Costa High School	Manhattan Beach, CA
G	3	Jalen Barbee	6 ft 6 in (1.98 m)	205 lb (93 kg)	Jr	Cochise College	Tacoma, WA
G	4	PJ II Fuller	6 ft 4 in (1.93 m)	175 lb (79 kg)	Sr	Washington	Seattle, WA
F	5	JJ Chaikovsky	6 ft 7 in (2.01 m)	205 lb (93 kg)	So	NJIT	Manhattan Beach, CA
F	6	Festus Ndumanya	6 ft 7 in (2.01 m)	225 lb (102 kg)	Sr	Southern	Anambra, Nigeria
F	7	Keonte Jones	6 ft 6 in (1.98 m)	192 lb (87 kg)	Sr	Midland College	Madison, WI
F	8	Marcus Jr. Adams	6 ft 8 in (2.03 m)	195 lb (88 kg)	So	BYU	Torrance, CA
G	10	Nathan Kwon	6 ft 0 in (1.83 m)	165 lb (75 kg)	Fr	Fairmont Prep Academy	Seal Beach, CA
F	11	Mahmoud Fofana	6 ft 6 in (1.98 m)	195 lb (88 kg)	Sr	Cal State San Bernardino	San Jose, CA
G/F	12	Scotty Washington	6 ft 4 in (1.93 m)	180 lb (82 kg)	Jr	California Baptist	Del Amo, CA
G	13	Sabien Cain	6 ft 3 in (1.91 m)	180 lb (82 kg)	Fr	Millennium High School	Indianapolis, IN
G	20	Robert Thibiant	6 ft 2 in (1.88 m)	185 lb (84 kg)	Jr	Sierra Canyon School	Chatsworth, CA
F/C	21	Grady Lewis	6 ft 9 in (2.06 m)	225 lb (102 kg)	Jr	Cal State East Bay	Phoenix, Arizona
G	23	Jordan Brinson	6 ft 2 in (1.88 m)	170 lb (77 kg)	Sr	Fresno State	Inglewood, CA
G	24	Greg Gazarian	6 ft 0 in (1.83 m)	175 lb (79 kg)	Fr	St. Francis High School	La Cañada Flintridge, CA
F	33	Judson Martindale	6 ft 7 in (2.01 m)	210 lb (95 kg)	GS	Pacific	Sudbury, MA

Head coach

- Andy Newman (Azusa Pacific)

Assistant coach(es)

- Scott Cutley (Cal State Fullerton)
- CJ Killin (Nebraska–Kearney)
- Brandon Shingles (Morehead State)

Legend

- (C) Team captain
- (S) Suspended
- (I) Ineligible
- (W) Walk-on
- Injured
- Current redshirt

Roster
Last update: October 27, 2024

== Schedule and results ==
Date time, TV	Rank^{#}	Opponent^{#}	Result	Record	High points	High rebounds	High assists	Site (attendance) city, state
Regular season
November 4, 2024*; 4:00 p.m., ESPN+		at St. Bonaventure	L 56–70	0–1	16 – Jones	9 – Jones	3 – 3 tied	Reilly Center (3,859); St. Bonaventure, NY
November 6, 2024*; 4:00 p.m., NEC Front Row		at Le Moyne	W 97–75	1–1	21 – 2 tied	11 – Jones	6 – Fuller II	Ted Grant Court (497); DeWitt, NY
November 13, 2024*; 7:00 p.m., ESPN+		Nobel	W 98–50	2–1	15 – 2 tied	10 – Jones	7 – Jones	Premier America Credit Union Arena (955); Northridge, CA
November 16, 2024*; 5:00 p.m., ESPN+		at Sacramento State	W 79–69	3–1	27 – Washington	10 – Fofana	4 – Jones	Hornets Nest (576); Sacramento, CA
November 24, 2024*; 1:00 p.m., ESPN+		vs. Utah Tech; Stew Morrill Classic	W 89–79	4–1	25 – Adams Jr.	9 – Jones	4 – Beard	Dahlberg Arena (138); Missoula, MT
November 25, 2024*; 1:00 p.m., ESPN+		vs. Denver; Stew Morrill Classic	W 89–60	5–1	19 – Adams Jr.	11 – Adams Jr.	4 – Beard	Dahlberg Arena (109); Missoula, MT
November 27, 2024*; 6:00 p.m., ESPN+		at Montana; Stew Morrill Classic	L 75–83	5–2	17 – Adams Jr.	12 – Jones	4 – 2 tied	Dahlberg Arena (2,284); Missoula, MT
November 30, 2024*; 1:00 p.m., ESPN+		at Montana State	W 72–69 ^{OT}	6–2	21 – Adams Jr.	11 – Jones	6 – Jones	Worthington Arena (2,467); Bozeman, MT
December 5, 2024; 7:00 p.m., ESPN+		UC Riverside	L 64–68	6–3 (0–1)	23 – Washington	10 – Jones	6 – Jones	Premier America Credit Union Arena (1,050); Northridge, CA
December 7, 2024; 5:00 p.m., ESPN+		at Cal Poly	W 102–91	7–3 (1–1)	22 – Fuller II	14 – Lewis	7 – Fuller II	Mott Athletics Center (1,638); San Luis Obispo, CA
December 18, 2024*; 7:00 p.m., BTN		at USC	L 69–90	7–4	17 – 2 tied	10 – Jones	4 – Jones	Galen Center (4,039); Los Angeles, CA
December 21, 2024*; 11:00 a.m., ESPN+		Chicago State	W 81–57	8–4	19 – Washington	8 – Jones	8 – Fuller II	Premier America Credit Union Arena (650); Northridge, CA
December 28, 2024*; 6:00 p.m., ESPN+		La Sierra	W 87–52	9–4	20 – Jones	10 – Jones	6 – Fuller II	Premier America Credit Union Arena (515); Northridge, CA
January 2, 2025; 7:00 p.m., ESPN+		at Cal State Fullerton	W 95–65	10–4 (2–1)	20 – Adams Jr.	6 – 2 tied	4 – Beard	Titan Gym (412); Fullerton, CA
January 4, 2025; 3:00 p.m., ESPN+		UC Davis	W 73–61	11–4 (3–1)	28 – Adams Jr.	20 – Jones	6 – Jones	Premier America Credit Union Arena (411); Northridge, CA
January 9, 2025; 7:00 p.m., ESPN+		UC Irvine	L 67–77	11–5 (3–2)	19 – Washington	13 – Fofana	3 – Jones	Premier America Credit Union Arena (453); Northridge, CA
January 11, 2025; 6:30 p.m., ESPN+		at Cal State Bakersfield	L 90–94	11–6 (3–3)	26 – Fofana	9 – Jones	5 – Jones	Icardo Center (850); Bakersfield, CA
January 16, 2025; 9:00 p.m., ESPN+		at Hawaii	W 83–60	12–6 (4–3)	24 – Washington	12 – Jones	3 – Beard	Stan Sheriff Center (4,237); Honolulu, HI
January 23, 2025; 7:00 p.m., ESPN+		Long Beach State	W 86–76	13–6 (5–3)	19 – Washington	8 – Jones	4 – 2 tied	Premier America Credit Union Arena (969); Northridge, CA
January 25, 2025; 7:00 p.m., ESPN+		at UC San Diego	L 54–79	13–7 (5–4)	17 – Washington	10 – Jones	5 – Beard	LionTree Arena (1,584); La Jolla, CA
January 30, 2025; 7:00 p.m., ESPN+		at UC Santa Barbara	W 78–71	14–7 (6–4)	21 – Washington	12 – Jones	7 – Jones	The Thunderdome (1,889); Santa Barbara, CA
February 1, 2025; 5:00 p.m., ESPN+		Cal State Bakersfield	W 88–62	15–7 (7–4)	16 – Jones	9 – Jones	5 – Fuller II	Premier America Credit Union Arena (907); Northridge, CA
February 6, 2025; 7:00 p.m., ESPN+		Cal State Fullerton	W 82–63	16–7 (8–4)	21 – Adams Jr.	12 – Jones	9 – Beard	Premier America Credit Union Arena (775); Northridge, CA
February 8, 2025; 4:00 p.m., ESPN+		at Long Beach State	W 81–80	17–7 (9–4)	25 – Adams Jr.	14 – Jones	8 – Jones	Walter Pyramid (1,557); Long Beach, CA
February 15, 2025; 5:00 p.m., ESPN+		Cal Poly	W 89–85	18–7 (10–4)	29 – Washington	12 – Jones	7 – Beard	Premier America Credit Union Arena (1,215); Northridge, CA
February 20, 2025; 7:00 p.m., ESPN+		at UC Irvine	W 84–72	19–7 (11–4)	24 – Adams Jr.	8 – Jones	6 – Beard	Bren Events Center (2,540); Irvine, CA
February 22, 2025; 2:00 p.m., ESPN+		at UC Davis	W 65–62	20–7 (12–4)	20 – Fofana	13 – Fofana	4 – Jones	University Credit Union Center (1,572); Davis, CA
February 27, 2025; 7:00 p.m., ESPN+		UC San Diego	L 71–77	20–8 (12–5)	20 – Jones	11 – Jones	6 – Beard	Premier America Credit Union Arena (2,298); Northridge, CA
March 1, 2025; 5:00 p.m., ESPN+		UC Santa Barbara	W 103–77	21–8 (13–5)	23 – Washington	8 – Fofana	6 – Jones	Premier America Credit Union Arena (1,398); Northridge, CA
March 6, 2025; 7:00 p.m., ESPN+		at UC Riverside	L 79–94	21–9 (13–6)	17 – Adams Jr.	8 – Jones	6 – Fuller II	SRC Arena (1,556); Riverside, CA
March 8, 2025; 5:00 p.m., ESPN+		Hawaii	W 82–73	22–9 (14–6)	21 – Adams Jr.	8 – Adams Jr.	6 – Beard	Premier America Credit Union Arena (2,055); Northridge, CA
Big West tournament
March 13, 2025; 6:00 p.m., ESPN+	(4)	vs. (5) UC Santa Barbara; Quarterfinals	L 72–78	22–10	19 – Jones	11 – Jones	3 – 2 tied	Lee's Family Forum; Henderson, NV
NIT
March 18, 2025*; 8:00 p.m., ESPN2		at (2) Stanford; First round	L 70–87	22–11	18 – Jones	7 – Lewis	4 – Beard	Maples Pavilion (1,119); Stanford, CA
*Non-conference game. ^{#}Rankings from AP poll. (#) Tournament seedings in parentheses. All times are in Pacific.
