= 2024–25 UC Santa Barbara Gauchos men's basketball team =

American college basketball season

2024–25 UC Santa Barbara Gauchos men's basketball
- Conference: Big West Conference
- Record: 21–13 (11–9 Big West)
- Head coach: Joe Pasternack (8th season)
- Assistant coaches: Brandon Cyrus; Brian Eskildsen; Skye Ettin; Derek Glasser
- Home arena: The Thunderdome (Capacity: 5,000)

2024–25 Big West men's basketball standings
	Conf.				Overall
Team	W		L	PCT	W		L	PCT
UC San Diego †	18	–	2	.900	30	–	5	.857
UC Irvine	17	–	3	.850	32	–	7	.821
UC Riverside	14	–	6	.700	21	–	13	.618
Cal State Northridge	14	–	6	.700	22	–	11	.667
UC Santa Barbara	11	–	9	.550	21	–	13	.618
UC Davis	9	–	11	.450	15	–	17	.469
Cal Poly	8	–	12	.400	16	–	19	.457
Cal State Bakersfield	8	–	12	.400	14	–	19	.424
Hawai'i	7	–	13	.350	15	–	16	.484
Long Beach State	3	–	17	.150	7	–	25	.219
Cal State Fullerton	1	–	19	.050	6	–	26	.188
† 2025 Big West tournament winner

The 2024–25 UC Santa Barbara Gauchos men's basketball team represented the University of California, Santa Barbara during the 2024–25 NCAA Division I men's basketball season. The Gauchos, led by eighth-year head coach Joe Pasternack, played their home games at The Thunderdome in Santa Barbara, California as members of the Big West Conference.

== Previous season ==
The Gauchos finished the 2023–24 season 16–15, 9–11 in Big West play to finish in a tie for seventh place. They were defeated by Cal State Northridge in the first round of the Big West tournament.

== Roster ==
2024–25 UC Santa Barbara Gauchos men's basketball team
Players
Coaches

Pos.	#	Name	Height	Weight	Year	Previous school	Hometown
F	00	Koat Keat Tong	6 ft 10 in (2.08 m)	220 lb (100 kg)	RS So	Crean Lutheran HS	Bentiu, South Sudan
G	1	Ben Shtolzberg	6 ft 4 in (1.93 m)	195 lb (88 kg)	Jr	Creighton	Northridge, California
G	2	Deuce Turner	6 ft 2 in (1.88 m)	190 lb (86 kg)	GS	San Diego	Coatesville, Pennsylvania
G	3	Chris Mitchell	6 ft 5 in (1.96 m)	200 lb (91 kg)	GS	Cal State San Bernardino	Oceanside, California
G	4	Cole Anderson	6 ft 4 in (1.93 m)	195 lb (88 kg)	Sr	Clovis West HS	Fresno, California
F	7	Colin Smith	6 ft 8 in (2.03 m)	220 lb (100 kg)	RS So	Vanderbilt	Dallas, Texas
F	9	Max Murrell	6 ft 9 in (2.06 m)	220 lb (100 kg)	GS	Stanford	Omaha, Nebraska
G	10	Jason Fontenet II	6 ft 6 in (1.98 m)	205 lb (93 kg)	So	Bella Vista Prep	Phoenix, Arizona
F	11	Kenny Pohto	6 ft 11 in (2.11 m)	240 lb (109 kg)	Sr	Wichita State	Stockholm, Sweden
C	12	Evans Kipruto	6 ft 8 in (2.03 m)	250 lb (113 kg)	Sr	Barton CC	Nairobi, Kenya
G	18	Henry Hartwell	6 ft 5 in (1.96 m)	190 lb (86 kg)	RS Jr	El Camino HS	Oceanside, California
F	23	Ariel Bland	6 ft 7 in (2.01 m)	230 lb (104 kg)	Sr	Golden State Prep	Eden Prairie, Minnesota
G	24	Zion Sensley	6 ft 8 in (2.03 m)	200 lb (91 kg)	Fr	Archbishop Riordan HS	San Carlos, California
G	26	Elia Bongiorno	6 ft 2 in (1.88 m)	190 lb (86 kg)	Fr	The King's Academy	Arona, Italy
G	27	Bryce Howard	6 ft 2 in (1.88 m)	185 lb (84 kg)	RS Jr	Cal State East Bay	Westlake Village, California
G	30	Stephan Swenson	6 ft 2 in (1.88 m)	195 lb (88 kg)	GS	Stetson	Brussels, Belgium
F	35	Bryce Bedgood	6 ft 11 in (2.11 m)	210 lb (95 kg)	Fr	Valencia HS	Valencia, California
F	40	David Pickles	6 ft 10 in (2.08 m)	235 lb (107 kg)	Sr	Mercer Island HS	Seattle, Washington
G	44	Zachiah Clark	6 ft 2 in (1.88 m)	205 lb (93 kg)	Fr	DNA Prep Academy	Calabasas, California
G	99	Max Sheldon	5 ft 11 in (1.8 m)	180 lb (82 kg)	Sr	San Marcos HS	Santa Barbara, California

Head coach

- Joe Pasternack (Indiana)

Assistant coach(es)

- Brandon Cyrus (UC Santa Barbara)
- Brian Eskildsen (Tennessee)
- Skye Ettin (TCNJ)
- Derek Glasser (Arizona State)

Legend

- (C) Team captain
- (S) Suspended
- (I) Ineligible
- (W) Walk-on
- Injured
- Current redshirt

Roster
Last update: October 29, 2024

== Schedule and results ==
Date time, TV	Rank^{#}	Opponent^{#}	Result	Record	High points	High rebounds	High assists	Site (attendance) city, state
Regular season
November 4, 2024*; 7:00 pm, ESPN+		San Francisco State	W 96–47	1–0	11 – Smith	8 – Fontenet II	5 – Swenson	The Thunderdome (3,357); Santa Barbara, CA
November 9, 2024*; 3:00 pm, ESPN+		at Portland	W 94–53	2–0	21 – Fontenet II	5 – Tied	5 – Tied	Chiles Center (1,304); Portland, OR
November 13, 2024*; 7:00 pm, ESPN+		Fresno State	W 91–86	3–0	24 – Turner	6 – Fontenet II	6 – Swenson	The Thunderdome (2,872); Santa Barbara, CA
November 17, 2024*; 2:00 pm, MWN		at San Jose State	W 64–59	4–0	18 – Anderson	10 – Pohto	7 – Pohto	Provident Credit Union Event Center (1,817); San Jose, CA
November 20, 2024*; 7:00 pm, ESPN+		UTEP	L 76–79	4–1	21 – Pohto	10 – Pohto	6 – Swenson	The Thunderdome (2,573); Santa Barbara, CA
November 26, 2024*; 7:00 pm, ESPN+		Eastern Washington	W 67–51	5–1	17 – Turner	8 – Pohto	5 – Pohto	The Thunderdome (1,541); Santa Barbara, CA
November 29, 2024*; 7:00 pm, ESPN+		Mississippi Valley State	W 81–48	6–1	16 – Sensley	7 – Keat Tong	7 – Shtolzberg	The Thunderdome (1,616); Santa Barbara, CA
December 5, 2024; 7:00 pm, ESPN+		UC San Diego	L 76–84	6–2 (0–1)	21 – Swenson	12 – Fontenet II	5 – Swenson	The Thunderdome (2,065); Santa Barbara, CA
December 7, 2024; 2:00 pm, ESPN+		at UC Davis	L 60–71	6–3 (0–2)	16 – Tied	9 – Pohto	4 – Smith	University Credit Union Center (2,891); Davis, CA
December 14, 2024*; 7:00 pm, ESPN+		Green Bay	W 83–66	7–3	23 – Turner	13 – Fontenet II	7 – Swenson	The Thunderdome (1,026); Santa Barbara, CA
December 18, 2024*; 5:00 pm, ESPN+		at Loyola Marymount	L 58–60	7–4	15 – Swenson	8 – Pohto	4 – Tied	Gersten Pavilion (962); Los Angeles, CA
December 22, 2024*; 11:00 am, ESPN+		at Missouri State	L 56–68	7–5	20 – Pohto	10 – Pohto	4 – Pohto	Great Southern Bank Arena (1,762); Springfield, MO
December 28, 2024*; 4:00 pm, ESPN+		Westcliff	W 89–72	8–5	21 – Turner	11 – Pohto	7 – Shtolzberg	The Thunderdome (1,491); Santa Barbara, CA
January 2, 2025; 9:00 pm, ESPN+		at Hawai'i	W 64–61	9–5 (1–2)	21 – Swenson	5 – Pohto	7 – Swenson	Stan Sheriff Center (4,753); Honolulu, HI
January 9, 2025; 7:00 pm, ESPN+		Cal State Bakersfield	W 78–66	10–5 (2–2)	17 – Fontenet II	9 – Pohto	5 – Swenson	The Thunderdome (2,757); Santa Barbara, CA
January 11, 2025; 5:00 pm, ESPN+		at Cal Poly; Rivalry	W 75–72	11–5 (3–2)	22 – Swenson	7 – Pohto	6 – Swenson	Mott Athletics Center (3,032); San Luis Obispo, CA
January 16, 2025; 7:00 pm, ESPN+/SPECTSN		UC Riverside	W 66–63	12–5 (4–2)	18 – Anderson	8 – Swenson	4 – Fontenet II	The Thunderdome (1,713); Santa Barbara, CA
January 18, 2025; 1:00 pm, ESPN+/SPECTSN		UC Davis	L 60–64	12–6 (4–3)	17 – Pohto	7 – Fontenet II	7 – Swenson	The Thunderdome (1,081); Santa Barbara, CA
January 23, 2025; 7:00 pm, ESPN+/SPECTSN		at UC San Diego	L 63–77	12–7 (4–4)	16 – Turner	8 – Pohto	3 – Turner	LionTree Arena (3442); La Jolla, CA
January 25, 2025; 6:00 pm, ESPN+		at Cal State Fullerton	W 83–75	13–7 (5–4)	29 – Anderson	9 – Fontenet II	7 – Swenson	Titan Gym (373); Fullerton, CA
January 30, 2025; 7:00 pm, ESPN+		Cal State Northridge	L 71–78	13–8 (5–5)	18 – Swenson	6 – Fontenet II	4 – Tied	The Thunderdome (1,889); Santa Barbara, CA
February 1, 2025; 7:00 pm, ESPN+		Long Beach State	W 85–54	14–8 (6–5)	20 – Swenson	8 – Keat Tong	5 – Swenson	The Thunderdome (2,212); Santa Barbara, CA
February 6, 2025; 6:30 pm, ESPN+		at Cal State Bakersfield	W 81–75	15–8 (7–5)	22 – Swenson	6 – Swenson	7 – Swenson	Icardo Center (1,091); Bakersfield, CA
February 8, 2025; 7:00 pm, ESPN+		Hawai'i	W 76–72	16–8 (8–5)	23 – Turner	8 – Fontenet II	5 – Tied	The Thunderdome (2,109); Santa Barbara, CA
February 13, 2025; 8:00 pm, ESPNU		at UC Irvine	L 60–62	16–9 (8–6)	18 – Swenson	10 – Pohto	5 – Fontenet II	Bren Events Center (2,781); Irvine, CA
February 15, 2025; 5:00 pm, ESPN+		at UC Riverside	L 69–81	16–10 (8–7)	24 – Pohto	8 – Fontenet II	6 – Fontenet II	SRC Arena (802); Riverside, CA
February 20, 2025; 7:00 pm, ESPN+		Cal State Fullerton	W 86–56	17–10 (9–7)	18 – Turner	5 – Tied	5 – Shtolzberg	The Thunderdome (2,019); Santa Barbara, CA
February 22, 2025; 4:00 pm, ESPN+		at Long Beach State	W 58–56	18–10 (10–7)	16 – Swenson	6 – Pohto	3 – Swenson	Walter Pyramid (1,863); Long Beach, CA
February 27, 2025; 7:00 pm, ESPN+		Cal Poly; Rivalry	W 96–77	19–10 (11–7)	19 – Fontenet II	7 – Sensley	8 – Swenson	The Thunderdome (4,000); Santa Barbara, CA
March 1, 2025; 5:00 pm, ESPN+		at Cal State Northridge	L 77–103	19–11 (11–8)	18 – Fontenet II	3 – Tied	3 – Tied	Premier America Credit Union Arena (1,398); Northridge, CA
March 8, 2025; 7:00 pm, ESPN+		UC Irvine	L 88–97	19–12 (11–9)	28 – Turner	6 – Swenson	5 – Fontenet II	The Thunderdome (2,903); Santa Barbara, CA
Big West tournament
March 12, 2025; 6:00 pm, ESPN+	(5)	vs. (8) Cal State Bakersfield; First round	W 71–66	20–12	15 – Swenson	7 – Pohto	5 – Fontenet II	Lee's Family Forum; Henderson, NV
March 13, 2025; 6:00 pm, ESPN+	(5)	vs. (4) Cal State Northridge; Quarterfinals	W 78–72	21–12	25 – Swenson	5 – Fontenet II	5 – Fontenet II	Lee's Family Forum; Henderson, NV
March 14, 2025; 6:00 pm, ESPN+/ESPNU	(5)	vs. (1) UC San Diego; Semifinals	L 51–69	21–13	12 – Tied	7 – Fontenet II	6 – Swenson	Lee's Family Forum; Henderson, NV
*Non-conference game. ^{#}Rankings from AP Poll. (#) Tournament seedings in parentheses. All times are in Pacific.
