= 2024–25 Stanford Cardinal men's basketball team =

American college basketball season

2024–25 Stanford Cardinal men's basketball

NIT, Second Round
- Conference: Atlantic Coast Conference
- Record: 21–14 (11–9 ACC)
- Head coach: Kyle Smith (1st season)
- Associate head coach: Eric Reveno
- Assistant coaches: Jim Shaw; Wayne Hunter; Derrick Wrobel; Stephen Frankoski
- Home arena: Maples Pavilion

2024–25 ACC men's basketball standings
	Conf.				Overall
Team	W		L	PCT	W		L	PCT
No. 3 Duke †	19	–	1	.950	35	–	4	.897
No. 21 Louisville	18	–	2	.900	27	–	8	.771
No. 22 Clemson	18	–	2	.900	27	–	7	.794
Wake Forest	13	–	7	.650	21	–	11	.656
North Carolina	13	–	7	.650	23	–	14	.622
SMU	13	–	7	.650	24	–	11	.686
Stanford	11	–	9	.550	21	–	14	.600
Georgia Tech	10	–	10	.500	17	–	17	.500
Virginia	8	–	12	.400	15	–	17	.469
Virginia Tech	8	–	12	.400	13	–	19	.406
Florida State	8	–	12	.400	17	–	15	.531
Notre Dame	8	–	12	.400	15	–	18	.455
Pittsburgh	8	–	12	.400	17	–	15	.531
Syracuse	7	–	13	.350	14	–	19	.424
California	6	–	14	.300	14	–	19	.424
NC State	5	–	15	.250	12	–	19	.387
Boston College	4	–	16	.200	12	–	19	.387
Miami (FL)	3	–	17	.150	7	–	24	.226
† 2025 ACC tournament winner Rankings from AP poll

The 2024–25 Stanford Cardinal men's basketball team represented Stanford University during the 2024–25 NCAA Division I men's basketball season. They played their home games at Maples Pavilion. They were led by first-year head coach Kyle Smith. This was the inaugural season for Stanford as members of the Atlantic Coast Conference.

The team started the season well, winning six straight games, a streak which culminated in a 71–69 win at Santa Clara. The team then went on a two-game losing streak, losing in the Acrisure Holiday Invitational to Grand Canyon and to Cal Poly. They rebounded to win three straight games, including a rivalry match and their ACC opener against California. That streak ended as the Cardinal faced their first ranked team of the season in number ten Oregon. They fell at a neutral site in the San Jose Tip-Off 76–61. They then went on their first ACC road trip to the east coast, where they lost to Clemson and Pittsburgh. They rebounded from the road trip and went 6–1 over their next seven games, with five of those games being at home. They went 1–1 in the road games, with a loss at Wake Forest and a win at North Carolina. The team stumbled and went 1–4 over their next five games. They only defeated NC State 74–73, while losing to SMU, Wake Forest, Georgia Tech and third-ranked Duke over the stretch. The Cardinal finished 3–2 over their last five games, winning their three games at home and losing their two games on the road. The stretch included wins over rival California, SMU, and Boston College. The two losses were their final to games of the season versus Notre Dame and fourteenth-ranked Louisville.

The Cardinal finished the season 21–14 and 11–9 in ACC play to finish in seventh place. As the seventh seed in the 2025 ACC tournament earned a bye into Second Round where they faced rival California for the third time during the season. They continued their dominance over the Golden Bears, defeating them for the third time during the season. They fell advanced to the Quarterfinals where they lost to second seed and thirteenth ranked Louisville for the second time in six days, 75–73. They received an at-large bid to the NIT. The Cardinal were a two-seed in the San Francisco Region. They defeated Cal State Northridge in the First Round before losing to Kent State 77–75 in the Second Round.

== Previous season ==
The Cardinal went 14–18, 8–12 in the Pac-12 conference. They finished tied for 9th in the conference and, as the 10th seed, played California in the first round of the Pac-12 Conference tournament. The Cardinal beat the Golden Bears 87–76 in overtime and faced their next head coach and the second seed, Washington State. The Cardinal lost to the Cougars 79–62, ending their season. After the game, the Cardinal fired their head coach Jerod Haase after eight seasons and zero appearances in the NCAA tournament.

== Offseason ==
=== Departures ===
Stanford departures
Name	Number	Pos.	Height	Weight	Year	Hometown	Reason for departure
Jared Bynum	1	G	5'10"	185	Graduate student	Rockville, MD	Graduated
Andrej Stojaković	2	G	6'7"	190	Freshman	Carmichael, CA	Transferred to California
Kanaan Carlyle	3	G	6'3"	185	Freshman	Alpharetta, GA	Transferred to Indiana
Roy Yuan	4	G	6'1"	170	Graduate student	San Jose, CA	Graduated
Max Murrell	10	F	6'10"	225	Senior	Omaha, NE	Transferred to UC Santa Barbara
Michael Jones	13	G	6'5"	205	Senior	Woodbury, MN	Graduated
Spencer Jones	14	F	6'7"	225	Graduate Student	Roeland Park, KS	Graduated/ went undrafted in the 2024 NBA draft, later signed with Denver Nuggets
James Keefe	22	F	6'9"	240	Graduate student	Los Angeles, CA	Graduated
Brandon Angel	23	F	6'8"	235	Senior	San Diego, CA	Transferred to Oregon
Josue Gil-Silva	25	G	6'1"	185	Graduate student	Salinas, CA	Graduated

=== Incoming transfers ===
Stanford additions
Name	Number	Pos.	Height	Weight	Year	Hometown	Notes
Jaylen Blakes	21	G	6'2"	195	Junior	Somerset, NJ	Transfer from Duke
Chisom Okpara	10	F	6'8"	225	Sophomore	Bronxville, NY	Transfer from Harvard
Darin Saran	1	G	6'4"	177	Freshman	Istanbul, Turkey	Transfer from UC Irvine
Oziyah Sellers	4	G	6'5"	185	Sophomore	Hayward, CA	Transfer from USC
Cole Kastner	9	F	6'7"	215	Graduate student	Palo Alto, CA	Transfer from Virginia (lacrosse)

=== 2024 recruiting class ===
College recruiting
Name	Hometown	School	Height	Weight	Commit date
Donavin Young; F	Pasco, WA	Link Academy	6 ft 8 in (2.03 m)	210 lb (95 kg)	May 13, 2024
Donavin Young; F	Recruit ratings: 247Sports:				
Evan Stinson; F	Cheney, WA	Cheney High School	6 ft 7 in (2.01 m)	180 lb (82 kg)	Apr 23, 2024
Evan Stinson; F	Recruit ratings: Rivals: 247Sports:				
Tallis Toure; C	Roseville, CA	West Park High School	6 ft 10 in (2.08 m)	215 lb (98 kg)	Apr 8, 2024
Tallis Toure; C	Recruit ratings: Rivals: ESPN: (77)				
Anthony Batson Jr. G	Scottsdale, AZ	Notre Dame Preparatory High School	6 ft 3 in (1.91 m)	180 lb (82 kg)	Jun 18, 2024
Anthony Batson Jr. G	Recruit ratings: 247Sports:				
Overall recruit ranking:
Note: In many cases, Scout, Rivals, 247Sports, On3, and ESPN may conflict in their listings of height and weight.; In these cases, the average was taken. ESPN grades are on a 100-point scale.; Sources: "Stanford 2023 Basketball Commitments". Rivals.; "2024 Team Ranking". Rivals.

== Roster ==
2024–25 Stanford Cardinal men's basketball team
Players
Coaches

Pos.	#	Name	Height	Weight	Year	Previous school	Hometown
G	0	Anthony Batson Jr.	6 ft 3 in (1.91 m)	185 lb (84 kg)	Fr	Notre Dame Preparatory High School	Scottsdale, AZ
G	1	Derin Saran	6 ft 4 in (1.93 m)	190 lb (86 kg)	Jr	Asheville School; UC Irvine	Istanbul, Turkey
F	2	Donavin Young	6 ft 11 in (2.11 m)	210 lb (95 kg)	Fr	Link Academy	Pasco, WA
F	3	Tallis Toure	6 ft 11 in (2.11 m)	220 lb (100 kg)	Fr	West Park High School	Roseville, CA
G	4	Oziyah Sellers	6 ft 5 in (1.96 m)	185 lb (84 kg)	So	Southern California Academy; USC	Hayward, CA
G	5	Benny Gealer	6 ft 1 in (1.85 m)	160 lb (73 kg)	Jr	Rolling Hills Preparatory	Palos Verdes Estates, CA
F	9	Cole Kastner (W)	6 ft 7 in (2.01 m)	215 lb (98 kg)	GS	Menlo School; Virginia	Palo Alto, CA
F	10	Chisom Okpara	6 ft 8 in (2.03 m)	225 lb (102 kg)	Jr	La Lumiere School; Harvard	Bronxville, NY
G	11	Ryan Agarwal	6 ft 6 in (1.98 m)	190 lb (86 kg)	Jr	Coppell High School	Coppell, TX
F	20	Cameron Grant (W)	6 ft 7 in (2.01 m)	185 lb (84 kg)	RS Fr	St. Edward High School	Lakewood, OH
G	21	Jaylen Blakes	6 ft 2 in (1.88 m)	205 lb (93 kg)	GS	Blair Academy; Duke	Somerset, NJ
F	24	Jaylen Thompson	6 ft 8 in (2.03 m)	195 lb (88 kg)	RS So	Southern California Academy	Alameda, CA
F	33	Evan Stinson	6 ft 7 in (2.01 m)	190 lb (86 kg)	Fr	Cheney High School	Cheney, WA
F	42	Maxime Raynaud	7 ft 1 in (2.16 m)	250 lb (113 kg)	Sr	Lycée Henri-IV	Paris, France
F	52	Aidan Cammann	6 ft 10 in (2.08 m)	220 lb (100 kg)	RS Fr	Brewster Academy	Wolfeboro, NH

Head coach

- Kyle Smith (Hamilton)

Assistant coach(es)

- Eric Reveno (Stanford)
- Jim Shaw (Western Oregon)
- Wayne Hunter (Saint Mary's)
- Derrick Wrobel (Arizona State)
- Stephen Frankoski (Columbia)

Legend

- (C) Team captain
- (S) Suspended
- (I) Ineligible
- (W) Walk-on
- Injured
- Current redshirt

Roster

== Schedule and results ==
Date time, TV	Rank^{#}	Opponent^{#}	Result	Record	High points	High rebounds	High assists	Site (attendance) city, state
Regular season
November 4, 2024*; 1:00 p.m., ACCNX/ESPN+		Denver	W 85–62	1–0	24 – Sellers	12 – Raynaud	6 – Tied	Maples Pavilion (2,286); Stanford, CA
November 8, 2024*; 1:00 p.m., ACCNX/ESPN+		Cal State Fullerton	W 80–53	2–0	20 – Gealer	14 – Raynaud	5 – Blakes	Maples Pavilion (1,818); Stanford, CA
November 12, 2024*; 7:00 p.m., ACCNX/ESPN+		Northern Arizona	W 90–64	3–0	22 – Raynaud	11 – Raynaud	5 – Gealer	Maples Pavilion (2,055); Stanford, CA
November 17, 2024*; 1:00 p.m., ACCNX/ESPN+		UC Davis; Acrisure Series Showcase on-campus game	W 79–65	4–0	33 – Raynaud	14 – Raynaud	4 – Blakes	Maples Pavilion (2,791); Stanford, CA
November 20, 2024*; 7:00 p.m., ACCNX/ESPN+		Norfolk State; Acrisure Series Showcase on-campus game	W 70–63	5–0	20 – Raynaud	10 – Raynaud	3 – Blakes	Maples Pavilion (1,881); Stanford, CA
November 23, 2024*; 7:00 p.m., ESPN+		at Santa Clara	W 71–69	6–0	32 – Raynaud	16 – Raynaud	10 – Blakes	Leavey Center (2,100); Santa Clara, CA
November 26, 2024*; 4:00 p.m., truTV		vs. Grand Canyon; Acrisure Series Showcase	L 71–78	6–1	29 – Raynaud	11 – Raynaud	5 – Blakes	Acrisure Arena (753); Thousand Palms, CA
November 30, 2024*; 7:00 p.m., ACCNX/ESPN+		Cal Poly	L 90–97	6–2	21 – Raynaud	9 – Agarwal	8 – Blakes	Maples Pavilion (2,658); Stanford, CA
December 3, 2024*; 7:00 p.m., ACCNX/ESPN+		Utah Valley	W 77–63	7–2	18 – Blakes	17 – Raynaud	4 – Tied	Maples Pavilion (2,033); Stanford, CA
December 7, 2024; 1:00 p.m., ACCN		at California; Rivalry	W 89–81	8–2 (1–0)	20 – Tied	7 – Tied	6 – Blakes	Haas Pavilion (6,089); Berkeley, CA
December 17, 2024*; 7:00 p.m., ACCNX/ESPN+		Merrimack	W 74–68	9–2	19 – Sellers	16 – Raynaud	5 – Blakes	Maples Pavilion (2,121); Stanford, CA
December 21, 2024*; 5:00 p.m., BTN		vs. No. 10 Oregon; San Jose Tip-Off	L 61–76	9–3	20 – Raynaud	13 – Raynaud	3 – Blakes	SAP Center; San Jose, CA
January 1, 2025; 4:00 p.m., ACCN		at Clemson	L 71–85	9–4 (1–1)	20 – Sellers	13 – Raynaud	5 – Blakes	Littlejohn Coliseum (8,337); Clemson, SC
January 4, 2025; 3:30 p.m., ESPN2		at Pittsburgh	L 68–83	9–5 (1–2)	21 – Raynaud	5 – Tied	5 – Blakes	Petersen Events Center (8,087); Pittsburgh, PA
January 8, 2025; 6:00 p.m., ACCN		Virginia Tech	W 70–59	10–5 (2–2)	19 – Tied	14 – Raynaud	6 – Blakes	Maples Pavilion (3,262); Stanford, CA
January 11, 2025; 1:00 p.m., ESPNU		Virginia	W 88–65	11–5 (3–2)	24 – Raynaud	10 – Raynaud	6 – Agarwal	Maples Pavilion (4,504); Stanford, CA
January 15, 2025; 3:30 p.m., ESPNews		at Wake Forest	L 67–80	11–6 (3–3)	16 – Sellers	11 – Raynaud	7 – Blakes	LJVM Coliseum (9,685); Winston-Salem, NC
January 18, 2025; 11:15 a.m., The CW		at North Carolina	W 72–71	12–6 (4–3)	25 – Raynaud	13 – Raynaud	7 – Blakes	Dean Smith Center (21,750); Chapel Hill, NC
January 22, 2025; 8:00 p.m., ESPNU		Miami (FL)	W 88–51	13–6 (5–3)	28 – Raynaud	12 – Raynaud	4 – Tied	Maples Pavilion (2,950); Stanford, CA
January 25, 2025; 4:00 p.m., ACCN		Florida State	W 78–71	14–6 (6–3)	27 – Sellers	14 – Raynaud	4 – Gealer	Maples Pavilion (3,837); Stanford, CA
January 29, 2025; 8:00 p.m., ESPNU		Syracuse	W 70–61	15–6 (7–3)	21 – Raynaud	15 – Raynaud	3 – Raynaud	Maples Pavilion (3,220); Stanford, CA
February 1, 2025; 3:00 p.m., ACCN		at SMU	L 61–85	15–7 (7–4)	19 – Sellers	10 – Raynaud	4 – Gealer	Moody Coliseum (6,176); Dallas, TX
February 5, 2025; 8:00 p.m., ESPNU		Wake Forest	L 73–79	15–8 (7–5)	16 – Raynaud	10 – Raynaud	6 – Raynaud	Maples Pavilion (2,774); Stanford, CA
February 8, 2025; 4:00 p.m., ACCN		NC State	W 74–73	16–8 (8–5)	25 – Raynaud	12 – Raynaud	8 – Agarwal	Maples Pavilion (4,841); Stanford, CA
February 12, 2025; 4:00 p.m., ACCN		at Georgia Tech	L 52–60	16–9 (8–6)	12 – Blakes	6 – Raynaud	6 – Blakes	McCamish Pavilion (3,869); Atlanta, GA
February 15, 2025; 1:00 p.m., ABC		at No. 3т Duke	L 70–106	16–10 (8–7)	19 – Raynaud	7 – Raynaud	5 – Gealer	Cameron Indoor Stadium (9,314); Durham, NC
February 22, 2025; 7:00 p.m., ESPN2		California; Rivalry	W 66–61	17–10 (9–7)	20 – Raynaud	8 – Tied	4 – Agarwal	Maples Pavilion (6,510); Stanford, CA
February 26, 2025; 6:00 p.m., ACCN		Boston College	W 78–60	18–10 (10–7)	23 – Raynaud	10 – Raynaud	4 – Blakes	Maples Pavilion (2,925); Stanford, CA
March 1, 2025; 2:00 p.m., ACCN		SMU	W 73–68	19–10 (11–7)	26 – Raynaud	5 – Cammann	4 – Tied	Maples Pavilion (3,890); Stanford, CA
March 5, 2025; 6:00 p.m., ESPNU		at Notre Dame	L 54–56	19–11 (11–8)	20 – Raynaud	12 – Agarwal	3 – Blakes	Joyce Center (4,043); South Bend, IN
March 8, 2025; 11:00 a.m., ESPNU		at No. 14 Louisville	L 48–68	19–12 (11–9)	17 – Raynaud	11 – Raynaud	5 – Blakes	KFC Yum! Center (18,707); Louisville, KY
ACC Tournament
March 12, 2025; 4:00 p.m., ESPN2	(7)	vs. (15) California; Second round / Rivalry	W 78–73	20–12	23 – Raynaud	8 – Raynaud	6 – Blakes	Spectrum Center (6,620); Charlotte, NC
March 13, 2025; 4:00 p.m., ESPN2	(7)	vs. (2) No. 13 Louisville; Quarterfinals	L 73–75	20–13	22 – Sellers	6 – Okpara	5 – Blakes	Spectrum Center (10,627); Charlotte, NC
NIT
March 18, 2025; 8:00 p.m., ESPN2	(2)	Cal State Northridge; First round – San Francisco Region	W 87–70	21–13	22 – Raynaud	11 – Raynaud	4 – Blakes	Maples Pavilion (1,119); Stanford, CA
March 23, 2025; 6:00 p.m., ESPN2	(2)	Kent State; Second round – San Francisco Region	L 75–77	21–14	23 – Blakes	10 – Raynaud	5 – Blakes	Maples Pavilion (1,542); Stanford, CA
*Non-conference game. ^{#}Rankings from AP Poll. (#) Tournament seedings in parentheses. All times are in Pacific Time.
