= Ace Bailey (disambiguation) =

Ace Bailey (1903–1992) was a Canadian professional ice hockey player for the Toronto Maple Leafs.

Ace Bailey may also refer to:

- Garnet "Ace" Bailey (1948–2001), Canadian ice hockey player and scout
- Ace Bailey (basketball) (born 2006), American basketball player
