= Brodie Johnston =

Vanderbilt Commodores – No. 9
- Infielder
- Born: March 16, 2006 (age 20); Chattanooga, Tennessee
- Bats: Right Throws: Right

Brodie Kenneth Johnston (born March 16, 2006) is an American college baseball third baseman for the Vanderbilt Commodores.

== Career ==
Johnston grew up in Ooltewah, Tennessee and attended Boyd-Buchanan School in nearby Chattanooga. As a senior in 2024, he had a batting average of .523 alongside eight home runs, 46 runs batted in (RBI) and 18 doubles and was named a MaxPreps All-American. He was ranked the number one overall prep prospect in Tennessee for the 2024 Major League Baseball draft, but removed his name from the draft and instead fulfilled his commitment to play college baseball at Vanderbilt University for the Vanderbilt Commodores. After graduating high school, he played collegiate summer baseball in the Appalachian League with the Greeneville Flyboys and hit .284 with five home runs and 47 RBI across 43 games.

As a freshman for Vanderbilt in 2025, Johnston was the Commodores starting third baseman and played in 56 games and batted .260 with 15 home runs and 55 RBI. He was named to the All-SEC Freshman Team as well as the All-SEC Defensive Team. Johnston returned to Vanderbilt in 2026 as the team's starting third baseman. Across 57 games, he hit .333 with 15 home runs and 47 RBI. After the season, he was invited to the USA Baseball Collegiate National Team training camp. He also played in the Cape Cod Baseball League with the Yarmouth–Dennis Red Sox and hit .226 with one home run and five RBI across nine games.
