= Santa Fe Christian Schools =

- SFC

Location
- 838 Academy Drive; Solana Beach, California 92075; United States; 32°59′31.57″N 117°15′25.66″W

Information
- Type: Private Christian
- Established: 1977
- Principal: Mike Siciliano (high school); Todd Deveau (middle school); Amanda Walker (elementary school)
- Headmaster: Rod Gilbert
- Grades: K–12
- Gender: Co-educational
- Enrollment: 1098 (K–12)
- Colors: Red, gold, white, and black
- Mascot: Eagle
- Website: sfcs.net

Santa Fe Christian Schools (SFC) is a private, coeducational, college-preparatory Christian school in Solana Beach, California. Founded in 1977, the school serves grades K–12 and is accredited by the Western Association of Schools and Colleges (WASC), the Association of Christian Schools International (ACSI), and the Council on Educational Standards and Accountability (CESA). SFC offers Advanced Placement and honors courses, competes in the CIF San Diego Section, and has received multiple National Blue Ribbon School awards.

== History ==
Santa Fe Christian was established in 1977 on a site formerly used as a resort hotel and later the San Diego Military Academy. The school separated from Christian Unified Schools of San Diego in 1985 to operate independently. In 2024, the school renamed its divisions: the Lower School became the Elementary School, and the Upper School became the High School. The campus underwent a significant expansion with a new classroom building completed in the 2020s.

== Campus ==
The campus is located at 838 Academy Drive in Solana Beach, California, and includes academic buildings, laboratories, libraries, arts and music facilities, and athletic fields. The campus also includes the Quad Building—an educational facility featuring a podium-level parking area and two upper levels with classrooms, lounges, and outdoor terraces.

== Academics ==
SFC offers Advanced Placement (AP) and honors courses in its high school. It received National Blue Ribbon School awards in 2011 (Elementary School, then called "Lower School"), 2015 (Middle School), and 2017 (High School, then called "Upper School").

According to San Diego Magazine, the school reports a 100% four-year college acceptance rate and accreditation with WASC, ACSI, and CESA. Niche.com ranks SFC among the top Christian high schools in San Diego County, California, with average SAT/ACT scores of 1310 and 31, respectively, and approximately 26% of students receiving financial aid.

== Athletics ==
SFC teams compete in the CIF San Diego Section. The boys' basketball team won the Division I title in 2020, defeating Carlsbad High School. The football program transitioned from eight-man to eleven-man play in the 1990s and has won multiple small-school championships.

== Arts and extracurriculars ==
The school offers theater productions, choir, band, and visual arts, with ensembles competing in regional festivals. Student clubs include Robotics, Model United Nations, Mock Trial, and the National Honor Society.

In 2021, students raised over $30,000 to replace a custodian's truck destroyed in a fire, an effort covered by ABC 10 News San Diego and NBC San Diego.

== Faith and spiritual life ==
According to its mission statement, SFC seeks to “partner with Christian parents to disciple students to embrace biblical truth, strive for academic excellence, and model Christ-like leadership.” Students take Bible courses and attend weekly chapel services; admission requires at least one parent to be a professing Christian active in a church.

== Tuition and financial aid ==
High school tuition is reported at $22,000–$27,500 annually, with lower rates at the elementary and middle school levels. According to ProPublica, approximately 25% of students receive financial aid, with an annual aid budget exceeding $1.5 million.

== Notable alumni ==
- Michelle Williams (actress) – Class of 1998; actress
- Jake Bailey – NFL punter.
- Katherine Hui – 2023 US Open girls’ singles champion.
- Hayden Gray – Professional basketball player for the Maine Celtics (NBA G League); standout at UC San Diego and 2025 Big West Defensive Player of the Year.
- Brock Miller – Class of 2009; professional football punter who has played in the NFL, XFL, USFL, and UFL

== See also ==
- La Jolla Country Day School
- Francis Parker School (San Diego)
- Canyon Crest Academy
- Torrey Pines High School
