= Jake Bailey (American football) =

American football player (born 1997)

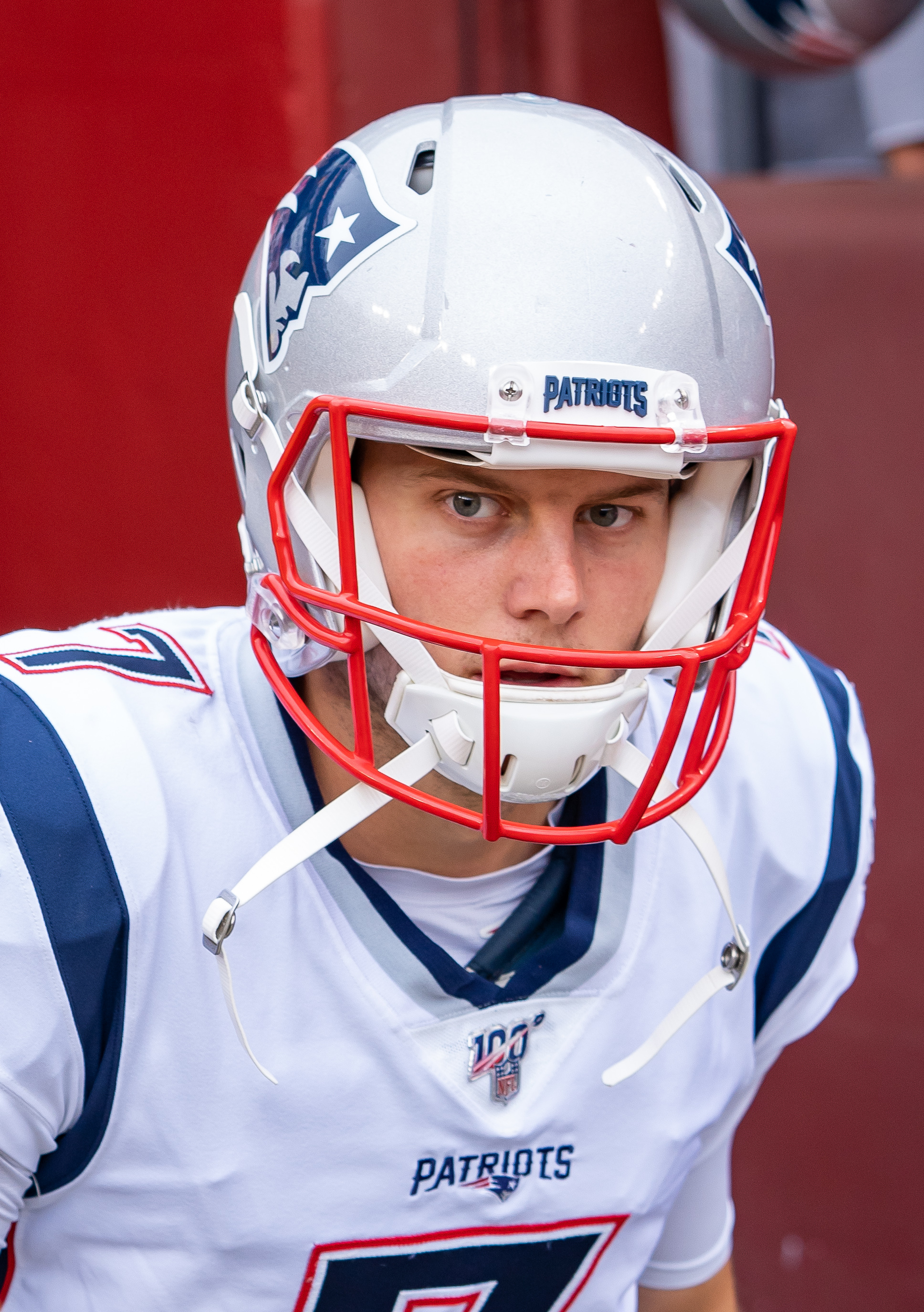
- Bailey with the New England Patriots in 2019

No. 16 – Atlanta Falcons
- Position: Punter
- Roster status: Active

Personal information
- Born: June 18, 1997 (age 29); Phoenix, Arizona, U.S.
- Listed height: 6 ft 2 in (1.88 m)
- Listed weight: 212 lb (96 kg)

Career information
- High school: Santa Fe Christian (Solana Beach, California)
- College: Stanford (2015–2018)
- NFL draft: 2019: 5th round, 163rd overall pick

Career history
- New England Patriots (2019–2022); Miami Dolphins (2023–2025); Atlanta Falcons (2026–present)

Awards and highlights
- First-team All-Pro (2020); Pro Bowl (2020); Second-team All-Pac-12 (2017, 2018)

Career NFL statistics as of Week 10, 2026
- Punts: 432
- Punting yards: 20,103
- Punting average: 46.5
- Longest punt: 71
- Inside 20: 181
- Stats at Pro Football Reference

Jacob Richard Bailey (born June 18, 1997) is an American professional football punter for the Atlanta Falcons of the National Football League (NFL). He played college football for the Stanford Cardinal.

== Early life ==
Bailey attended Santa Fe Christian Schools in Solana Beach, California. During his high school career, he was the nation's fourth-best kicker rated by ESPN and the nation's sixth-best punter rated by 24/7Sports. He lettered in football, track and field, and soccer.

== College career ==
While at Stanford, Bailey had the longest punt in the school's history at 84 yards. In four years he punted 185 times and is the all-time team leader in career punt average with 43.8 yards per kick. Bailey was a three-time All-Pac-12 Conference honoree and two-time Pac-12 All-Academic honorable mention.

== Professional career ==
Pre-draft measurables
Height	Weight	Arm length	Hand span	Wingspan	40-yard dash	10-yard split	20-yard split	Vertical jump	Broad jump	Bench press
6 ft 1 3/8 in (1.86 m)	200 lb (91 kg)	30 in (0.76 m)	8 3/4 in (0.22 m)	6 ft 2 1/2 in (1.89 m)	4.72 s	1.59 s	2.75 s	33.0 in (0.84 m)	9 ft 9 in (2.97 m)	16 reps
All values from NFL Combine

=== New England Patriots ===
==== 2019 season ====
Bailey was selected by the New England Patriots in the fifth round (163rd overall) of the 2019 NFL draft.

Upon joining the roster, Bailey competed with incumbent punter Ryan Allen, who had been with the Patriots for six seasons and had won three Super Bowls with the team. Bailey won the competition, and Allen was released on August 19, 2019, after the Patriots' second preseason game. Bailey served as the Patriots' holder on field goals, as Allen did. After Patriots kicker Stephen Gostkowski was placed on injured reserve, Bailey took over kickoff duties as well.

On September 25, 2019, he was named American Football Conference (AFC) Special Teams Player of the Week for his efforts against the New York Jets in Week 3. He again won the AFC Special Teams Player of the Week in Week 11 versus the Philadelphia Eagles, when he had five punts of 50+ yards and six landing inside the 20.

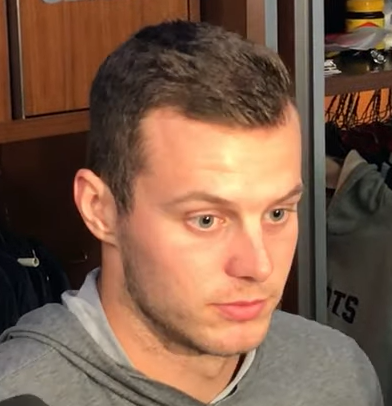
Bailey in 2019

==== 2020 season ====
He averaged 48.7 gross yards per punt, had a long of 71, and landed 31 punts inside the 20 yard line.

Bailey was one of three Patriots players, along with special teamer Matthew Slater and cornerback Stephon Gilmore, named to the 2021 Pro Bowl.

In January 2021, Bailey was named to the 2020 AP All-Pro first team at punter, making him the first Patriots punter so honored. He received 26 of 50 votes. Bailey was one of three Patriots special teamers named to the team; Gunner Olszewski was named first-team punt returner, and Matthew Slater was named second-team special teamer.

==== 2022 season ====
On August 1, 2022, Bailey signed a four-year, $13.5 million contract extension through the 2025 season. He was placed on injured reserve on November 19, 2022.

On March 10, 2023, Bailey was released by the Patriots.

=== Miami Dolphins ===
On March 17, 2023, Bailey signed with the Miami Dolphins.

On March 14, 2024, Bailey re-signed with the Dolphins on a two-year contract extension.

=== Atlanta Falcons ===
On March 12, 2026, Bailey signed a three-year, $9 million contract with the Atlanta Falcons.

== Career statistics ==
=== NFL ===
==== Regular season ====
Year	Team	GP	Punting				
Year	Team	GP	Punts	Yds	Avg	Lng	Blk
2019	NE	16	81	3,638	44.9	65	0
2020	NE	16	55	2,678	48.7	71	0
2021	NE	17	49	2,316	47.3	71	3
2022	NE	9	37	1,557	42.1	62	0
2023	MIA	17	53	2,424	45.7	66	0
2024	MIA	17	56	2,639	47.1	64	1
2025	MIA	17	63	3,005	47.7	64	0
2026	ATL	10	38	1,846	48.6	67	0
Career		119	432	20,103	46.5	71	4

==== Postseason ====
Year	Team	GP	Punting				
Year	Team	GP	Punts	Yds	Avg	Lng	Blk
2019	NE	1	5	230	46.0	61	0
2021	NE	1	3	142	47.3	53	0
2023	MIA	1	4	164	40.8	51	0
Career		3	12	536	44.6	61	0

=== College ===
Season	Team	Class	GP	Punting		
Season	Team	Class	GP	Punts	Yds	Avg
2015	Stanford	FR	7	10	347	34.7
2016	Stanford	SO	13	50	2,176	43.5
2017	Stanford	JR	14	57	2,586	45.4
2018	Stanford	SR	13	68	2,996	44.1
Career			47	185	8,105	43.8

== Personal life ==
His parents are Brad and Susan Bailey and he has one sister named Aly. While at Stanford, he got his pilot's license.

On December 19, 2023, Jake got engaged to attorney Bailey Medeiros, a former New England Patriots cheerleader and Miss Massachusetts Teen USA 2014. On March 8, 2025, Bailey got married in Cabo San Lucas.
