= Hayden Gray =

American basketball player (born 2003)

No. 3 – Maine Celtics
- Position: Shooting guard
- League: NBA G League

Personal information
- Born: May 11, 2003 (age 23) San Diego, California, U.S.
- Listed height: 6 ft 4 in (1.93 m)
- Listed weight: 190 lb (86 kg)

Career information
- High school: Santa Fe Christian Schools (Solana Beach, California)
- College: Azusa Pacific (2021–2023); UC San Diego (2023–2025)
- NBA draft: 2025: undrafted
- Playing career: 2025–present

Career history
- 2025–2026: Maine Celtics
- 2026: Utah Jazz
- 2026–present: Maine Celtics

Career highlights
- Second-team All-Big West (2025); Big West Defensive Player of the Year (2025)
- Stats at NBA.com
- Stats at Basketball Reference

Hayden Gray (born May 11, 2003) is an American professional basketball player for the Maine Celtics of the NBA G League. He played college basketball for the Azusa Pacific Cougars and UC San Diego Tritons.

== Early life ==
Gray was born on May 11, 2003. (Note: Sources give conflicting birthplaces for Gray, with Basketball-Reference listing San Diego and his college bio from UC San Diego listing Napa Valley.) He attended Santa Fe Christian School in Solana Beach, California, where he starred on the basketball team. As a senior, Gray helped Santa Fe Christian to a California Interscholastic Federation (CIF) Division 1A state championship title. He also played for Gamepoint Basketball on the Amateur Athletic Union (AAU) circuit.

== College career ==
After beginning his college career at Azusa Pacific University in Division II, Gray transferred to Division I UC San Diego where he played two seasons in 2023-24 and 2024-25.

Gray had a stellar senior season at UC San Diego, being named as a finalist for the 2025 Naismith Defensive Player of the Year, named to the 2025 Big West Championship All-Tournament Team and 2025 All-Big West Second Team while being named the 2025 Big West Defensive Player of the Year.

In 2025, Gray averaged 11.2 points, 3.1 rebounds, 3.3 assists and 3.1 steals, helping the Tritons to a school record 30-5 record and the program's first NCAA tournament appearance. The Tritons lost to Michigan 68-65 in the first round of the 2025 NCAA Division I men's basketball tournament. He ended the season as the nation's leader in total steals.

== Professional career ==
=== Maine Celtics (2025–2026) ===
Gray joined the Boston Celtics' Summer League team for the 2025 NBA Summer League. On July 20, 2025, it was reported that Gray had signed a contract with the Maine Celtics of the NBA G League. The next day, it was reported that Gray signed an Exhibit 10 contract with Boston. On September 20, Gray was waived by the Celtics. In November, Gray was officially named to Maine' Opening Night roster.

=== Utah Jazz (2026) ===
On April 11, 2026, Gray signed a multi-year contract with the Utah Jazz, and he made his NBA debut the next day against the Los Angeles Lakers. He became the first player from UC San Diego to play in the NBA. In the 131–107 loss, Gray recorded six points, one assist, one block, and one steal on 2–of–3 shooting. On June 29, the Jazz declined their team option on Gray, making him a free agent.

On September 23, 2026, Gray signed with the Boston Celtics.

== Career statistics ==
Legend
GP	Games played	GS	Games started	MPG	Minutes per game
FG%	Field goal percentage	3P%	3-point field goal percentage	FT%	Free throw percentage
RPG	Rebounds per game	APG	Assists per game	SPG	Steals per game
BPG	Blocks per game	PPG	Points per game	**Bold**	Career high

=== NBA ===
Year	Team	GP	GS	MPG	FG%	3P%	FT%	RPG	APG	SPG	BPG	PPG
2025–26	Utah	1	0	25.0	.667	.000	1.000	.0	1.0	1.0	1.0	6.0
Career		1	0	25.0	.667	.000	1.000	.0	1.0	1.0	1.0	6.0

=== College ===
Year	Team	GP	GS	MPG	FG%	3P%	FT%	RPG	APG	SPG	BPG	PPG
2021–22	Azuza Pacific	31	27	25.8	.456	.250	.627	3.1	3.0	2.1	.4	9.0
2022–23	Azuza Pacific	30	30	26.8	.443	.326	.673	3.0	3.8	1.8	.3	10.0
2023–24	UC San Diego	33	33	32.7	.472	.343	.831	4.2	3.8	1.6	.5	9.0
2024–25	UC San Diego	35	35	32.1	.479	.418	.688	3.1	3.3	3.1	.2	11.2
