= Brock Miller =

American football player (born 1991)

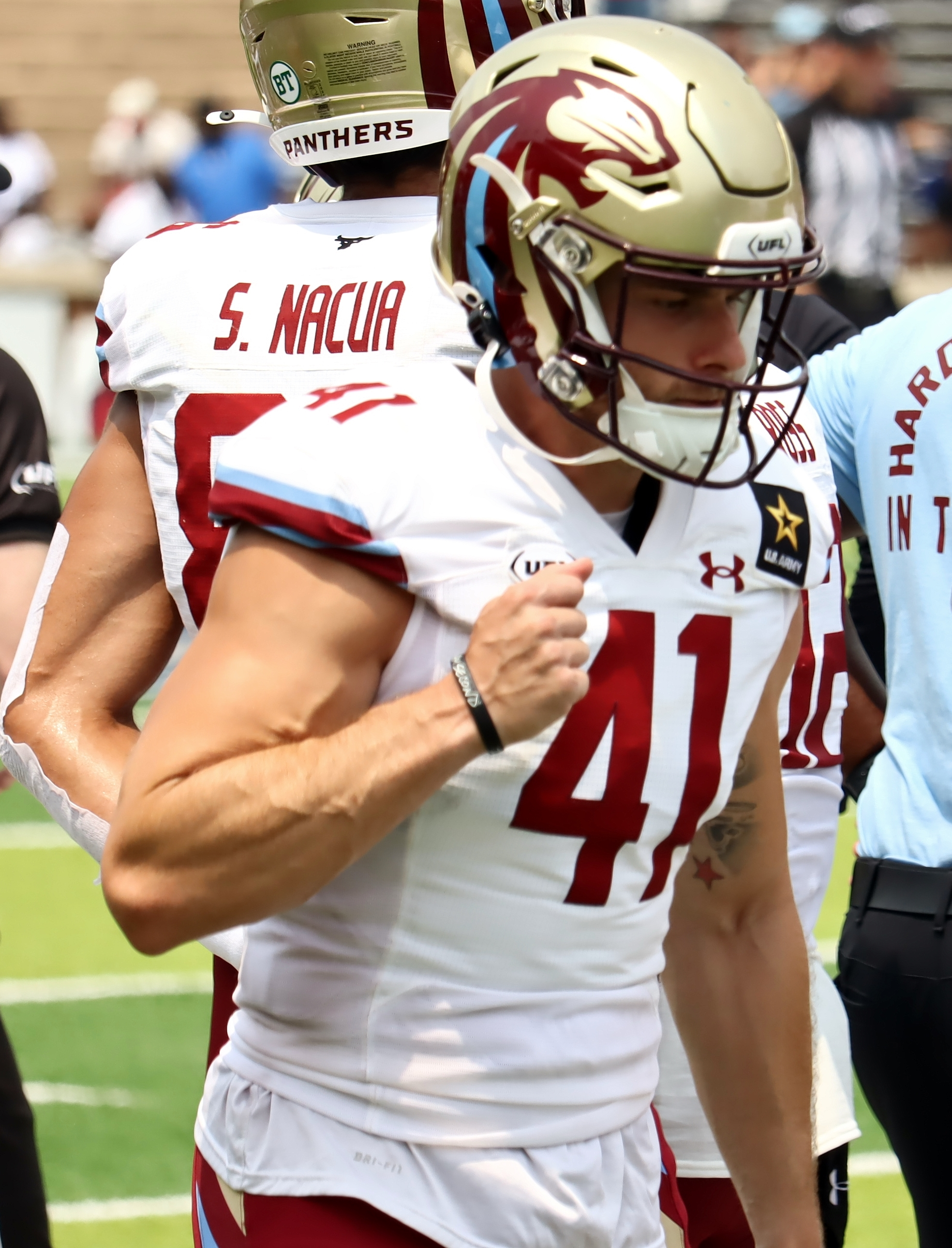
- Miller with the Michigan Panthers in 2024

Profile
- Position: Punter

Personal information
- Born: February 14, 1991 (age 35)
- Listed height: 6 ft 0 in (1.83 m)
- Listed weight: 195 lb (88 kg)

Career information
- High school: Santa Fe Christian (Solana Beach, CA)
- College: Southern Utah (2009–2013)
- NFL draft: 2014: undrafted

Career history
- San Francisco 49ers (2017)*; New York Giants (2018)*; Los Angeles Rams (2019)*; Seattle Dragons (2020); New Jersey Generals (2022); Los Angeles Rams (2022)*; New Jersey Generals (2023); Michigan Panthers (2024)
- * Offseason or practice squad member only

Awards and highlights
- UFL punting yards leader (2024)
- Stats at Pro Football Reference

Brock Miller (born February 14, 1991) is an American professional football punter. He played college football at Southern Utah and has been a member of the San Francisco 49ers, New York Giants, and Los Angeles Rams of the National Football League (NFL); the Seattle Dragons of the XFL; the New Jersey Generals of the United States Football League (USFL), and the Michigan Panthers of the United Football League (UFL).

== Early life ==
Miller was born in San Diego, California to Cammie and Doug Miller. He attended Santa Fe Christian High school where he played in punter and kicker positions for the Eagles football team. He made 8 of 11 field goals and earned second-team all-state honors. A two-sport athlete, Miller played and lettered in ice hockey. Despite earning a letter in ice hockey, Miller pursued football and on February 18, 2009, Miller signed with Southern Utah University.

== College career ==
Miller attended Southern Utah University from 2009 to 2013. Missing the 2009 season, Miller joined the Southern Utah Thunderbirds for the 2010 season, during which he filled the role of placekicker mid-season. His performance earned him honorable mention all-GWC honors. During the 2011 season, Miller juggled place-kicking, kickoff and punting duties. During his senior season in 2012, Miller was the team's sole punter, kicking 67 times and totaling 2,896 yards. His punting average of 43.3 yards made the fourth-best average in SUU history. While at SUU, Miller's intended major was education.

== Professional career ==
=== San Francisco 49ers ===
After multiple mini-camp workouts, the San Francisco 49ers signed Miller to a future contract on January 17, 2017. He was released on May 2, 2017.

=== New York Giants ===
On December 8, 2018, the New York Giants signed Miller to their practice squad. He was released on December 10, 2018, but was re-signed on December 27, 2018.

=== Los Angeles Rams (first stint) ===
On August 6, 2019, Miller signed with the Los Angeles Rams. He was released on August 31, 2019, during final roster cuts.

=== Seattle Dragons ===
On October 18, 2019, Miller was drafted by the Seattle Dragons of the XFL. The league suspended operations on April 10, 2020.

=== New Jersey Generals (first stint) ===
On March 20, 2022, Miller was drafted by the New Jersey Generals of the USFL.

=== Los Angeles Rams (second stint) ===
On December 27, 2022, Miller signed with the Los Angeles Rams.

=== New Jersey Generals (second stint) ===
On January 24, 2023, the New Jersey Generals re-signed Miller for the 2023 season. The Generals folded when the XFL and USFL merged to create the United Football League (UFL).

=== Michigan Panthers ===
On January 5, 2024, Miller was selected by the Michigan Panthers during the 2024 UFL dispersal draft.

== Personal life ==
Between football assignments, Miller has worked as a sales representative since 2017.
