= Ace Bailey (basketball) =

American basketball player (born 2006)

No. 19 – Utah Jazz
- Position: Small forward
- League: NBA

Personal information
- Born: August 13, 2006 (age 20) Chattanooga, Tennessee, U.S.
- Listed height: 6 ft 9 in (2.06 m)
- Listed weight: 200 lb (91 kg)

Career information
- High school: Boyd-Buchanan School (Chattanooga, Tennessee); McEachern (Powder Springs, Georgia)
- College: Rutgers (2024–2025)
- NBA draft: 2025: 1st round, 5th overall pick
- Drafted by: Utah Jazz
- Playing career: 2025–present

Career history
- 2025–present: Utah Jazz

Career highlights
- NBA All-Rookie Second Team (2026); Third-team All-Big Ten (2025); Big Ten All-Freshman Team (2025); McDonald's All-American (2024); Jordan Brand Classic (2024); Nike Hoop Summit (2024); Mr. Georgia Basketball (2024)
- Stats at NBA.com
- Stats at Basketball Reference

Airious "Ace" Bailey (born August 13, 2006) is an American professional basketball player for the Utah Jazz of the National Basketball Association (NBA). He played college basketball for the Rutgers Scarlet Knights. He was a consensus five-star recruit and one of the top players in the 2025 NBA draft class.

== Early life and high school career ==
Bailey grew up in Chattanooga, Tennessee, and initially attended Boyd-Buchanan School. After his freshman year, he moved to Powder Springs, Georgia, and enrolled at McEachern High School. Bailey averaged 22 points, 14 rebounds, three assists and four blocks per game as a junior. He improved his stats to 32.5 points, 15.5 rebounds, 3.5 assists and 2.4 blocks per game as a senior. Bailey was selected to play in the 2024 McDonald's All-American Game, Jordan Brand Classic and Nike Hoop Summit during his senior year.

=== Recruiting ===
Bailey was a consensus five-star recruit and one of the top players in the 2024 class, according to major recruiting services. On January 15, 2023, he committed to playing college basketball for Rutgers over offers from Ohio State, Kentucky, Kansas, Texas and Oregon. Bailey signed a National Letter of Intent to play for the Scarlet Knights on November 12, 2023, during the early signing period.

College recruiting
Name	Hometown	School	Height	Weight	Commit date
Ace Bailey; SG / SF	Chattanooga, TN	McEachern (GA)	6 ft 8 in (2.03 m)	210 lb (95 kg)	Jan 15, 2023
Ace Bailey; SG / SF	Recruit ratings: Rivals: 247Sports: On3: ESPN: (97)				
Overall recruit ranking: Rivals: 2 247Sports: 2 On3: 2 ESPN: 2
Note: In many cases, Scout, Rivals, 247Sports, On3, and ESPN may conflict in their listings of height and weight.; In these cases, the average was taken. ESPN grades are on a 100-point scale.; Sources: "Rutgers 2024 Basketball Commitments". Rivals.; "2024 Rutgers Scarlet Knights Recruiting Class". ESPN.; "2024 Team Ranking". Rivals.

== College career ==
Bailey became the highest-ranked recruit in Rutgers program history. After missing the first two games due to injury, he made his college basketball debut on November 15, 2024, scoring 17 points and adding six rebounds, two steals, and one block in a win over Monmouth. On November 20, he recorded his first career double-double with 23 points and 10 rebounds against Merrimack. Bailey earned Big Ten Freshman of the Week honors (alongside Kasparas Jakucionis) following his career-high 39-point performance against Indiana on January 2, 2025. On January 19, he was named Big Ten Freshman of the Week for the second time after leading the team to a 2–0 week and topping the scoring charts with two double-doubles: 20 points and 10 rebounds against UCLA, and 24 points with 11 rebounds against Nebraska.

At the conclusion of his freshman year, Bailey declared for the 2025 NBA Draft on April 23, foregoing his remaining college eligibility. He finished his collegiate career having earned third-team All-Big Ten and Big Ten All-Freshman Team honors.

== Professional career ==
Bailey was selected with the fifth overall pick by the Utah Jazz in the 2025 NBA draft. On July 2, he signed with the Jazz with Walter Clayton Jr.

On January 22, 2026, Bailey recorded a then-career-high 25 points along with 6 rebounds and 3 assists in a game against the San Antonio Spurs. On February 10, during a game against the Atlanta Hawks, Bailey surpassed the 500-point milestone in his 45th career game. At 19 years and 181 days old, he became the youngest player in Jazz franchise history to reach 500 career points. On March 5, Bailey scored a then career-high 32 points in a 122–112 win over the Washington Wizards. On March 23, Bailey scored a career high 37 points in a 127-143 loss against the Toronto Raptors .

== Career statistics ==
Legend
GP	Games played	GS	Games started	MPG	Minutes per game
FG%	Field goal percentage	3P%	3-point field goal percentage	FT%	Free throw percentage
RPG	Rebounds per game	APG	Assists per game	SPG	Steals per game
BPG	Blocks per game	PPG	Points per game	**Bold**	Career high

=== NBA ===
Year	Team	GP	GS	MPG	FG%	3P%	FT%	RPG	APG	SPG	BPG	PPG
2025–26	Utah	72	61	27.6	.443	.344	.750	4.2	1.8	.8	.7	13.8
Career		72	61	27.6	.443	.344	.750	4.2	1.8	.8	.7	13.8

=== College ===
Year	Team	GP	GS	MPG	FG%	3P%	FT%	RPG	APG	SPG	BPG	PPG
2024–25	Rutgers	30	30	33.3	.460	.346	.692	7.2	1.3	1.0	1.3	17.6

== Personal life ==
Bailey's mother, Ramika McGee, played college basketball at West Virginia University. Bailey's father, Richard Bailey, played college basketball at Houston. His aunt, Venus Lacy, played in the WNBA and was a member of Team USA's 1996 Olympic team that won a gold medal.
