= 2025–26 Utah Jazz season =

- Head coach: Will Hardy
- President: Austin Ainge
- General manager: Justin Zanik
- Owner: Ryan Smith
- Arena: Delta Center

Results
- Record: 22–60 (.268)
- Place: Division: 5th (Northwest); Conference: 15th (Western)
- Playoff finish: Did not qualify
- Stats at Basketball Reference

Local media
- Television: KJZZ-TV; KUTV; Kiswe (Jazz+); Root Sports Northwest
- Radio: 1280; 97.5 The Zone

The 2025–26 Utah Jazz season was the 52nd season for the franchise in the National Basketball Association (NBA) and 47th in Salt Lake City, Utah. This marked the first season the team have fully integrated their modern purple mountain identity, officially phasing out the previous black and yellow color scheme that was used since the 2022–23 season.

On March 18, the Utah Jazz were eliminated from playoff contention for the fourth consecutive season following a loss to the Minnesota Timberwolves. They would finish the season with a negative regular season record of 22–60, despite a five-game improvement over their previous season. The Jazz had the same record as the Sacramento Kings, but lost the tiebreaker due to a worse record against fellow Western Conference teams, landing them the worst record in such conference.

== Draft picks ==
Round	Pick	Player	Position	Nationality	College
1	5	Ace Bailey	Small Forward	United States	Rutgers
1	21	Will Riley	Small Forward	Canada	Illinois
2	43	Jamir Watkins	Shooting Guard	United States	Florida State
2	53	John Tonje	Shooting Guard	United States	Wisconsin

The Jazz held two first-round picks and two second-round picks entering the draft. Their fifth overall selection was their own, while the remaining three picks were acquired through previous trades.

== Roster ==
2025–26 Utah Jazz roster
Players

Pos.	No.	Player	Height	Weight	DOB	From
F	19	Ace Bailey	6 ft 9 in (2.06 m)	200 lb (91 kg)	2006-08-13	Rutgers
G	8	Isaiah Collier	6 ft 4 in (1.93 m)	210 lb (95 kg)	2004-10-08	USC
C	22	Kyle Filipowski	6 ft 11 in (2.11 m)	250 lb (113 kg)	2003-10-07	Duke
G	3	Keyonte George (injured)	6 ft 4 in (1.93 m)	185 lb (84 kg)	2003-11-08	Baylor
SG	33	Hayden Gray	6 ft 7 in (2.01 m)	190 lb (86 kg)	2003-05-11	UC San Diego
G	16	Elijah Harkless (TW)	6 ft 3 in (1.91 m)	195 lb (88 kg)	2000-02-03	UNLV
F	2	Blake Hinson (TW)	6 ft 8 in (2.03 m)	230 lb (104 kg)	1999-12-26	Pittsburgh
F/C	20	Jaren Jackson Jr. (injured)	6 ft 10 in (2.08 m)	242 lb (110 kg)	1999-09-15	Michigan State
C	24	Walker Kessler (injured)	7 ft 2 in (2.18 m)	245 lb (111 kg)	2001-07-26	Auburn
SG	55	John Konchar	6 ft 5 in (1.96 m)	210 lb (95 kg)	1996-03-22	Purdue Fort Wayne
F/C	42	Kevin Love	6 ft 10 in (2.08 m)	251 lb (114 kg)	1988-09-07	UCLA
F	23	Lauri Markkanen (injured)	7 ft 1 in (2.16 m)	240 lb (109 kg)	1997-05-22	Arizona
SG	21	Bez Mbeng	6 ft 4 in (1.93 m)	185 lb (84 kg)	2003-05-02	Yale
G/F	10	Sviatoslav Mykhailiuk	6 ft 7 in (2.01 m)	205 lb (93 kg)	1997-06-10	Kansas
C	30	Jusuf Nurkić (injured)	6 ft 11 in (2.11 m)	290 lb (132 kg)	1994-08-23	Bosnia and Herzegovina
F	28	Brice Sensabaugh	6 ft 6 in (1.98 m)	235 lb (107 kg)	2003-10-30	Ohio State
F/C	34	Oscar Tshiebwe (TW)	6 ft 8 in (2.03 m)	255 lb (116 kg)	1999-11-27	Kentucky
F	5	Cody Williams	6 ft 8 in (2.03 m)	190 lb (86 kg)	2004-11-20	Colorado

Coaches
Head coach
- Will Hardy
Assistant(s)
- Chad Forcier
- Chris Jones
- Scott Morrison
- Sean Sheldon
- Jason Terry
- Mike Williams
- Steve Wojciechowski
- Andrew Warren

Legend
- (DP) Unsigned draft pick
- (FA) Free agent
- (S) Suspended
- (GL) On assignment to G League affiliate
- (TW) Two-way affiliate player
- Injured

Roster
Updated: April 11, 2026

== Standings ==
=== Division ===
Northwest Division	W	L	PCT	GB	Home	Road	Div	GP
z – Oklahoma City Thunder	64	18	.780	–	34‍–‍8	30‍–‍10	12‍–‍4	82
x – Denver Nuggets	54	28	.659	10.0	28‍–‍13	26‍–‍15	11‍–‍5	82
x – Minnesota Timberwolves	49	33	.598	15.0	26‍–‍15	23‍–‍18	9‍–‍7	82
x – Portland Trail Blazers	42	40	.512	22.0	24‍–‍17	18‍–‍23	7‍–‍9	82
Utah Jazz	22	60	.268	42.0	14‍–‍27	8‍–‍33	1‍–‍15	82

=== Conference ===
Western Conference
#	Team	W	L	PCT	GB	GP
1	z – Oklahoma City Thunder *	64	18	.780	–	82
2	y – San Antonio Spurs *	62	20	.756	2.0	82
3	x – Denver Nuggets	54	28	.659	10.0	82
4	y – Los Angeles Lakers *	53	29	.646	11.0	82
5	x – Houston Rockets	52	30	.634	12.0	82
6	x – Minnesota Timberwolves	49	33	.598	15.0	82
7	x – Phoenix Suns	45	37	.549	19.0	82
8	x – Portland Trail Blazers	42	40	.512	22.0	82
9	pi – Los Angeles Clippers	42	40	.512	22.0	82
10	pi – Golden State Warriors	37	45	.451	27.0	82
11	New Orleans Pelicans	26	56	.317	38.0	82
12	Dallas Mavericks	26	56	.317	38.0	82
13	Memphis Grizzlies	25	57	.305	39.0	82
14	Sacramento Kings	22	60	.268	42.0	82
15	Utah Jazz	22	60	.268	42.0	82

== Game log ==
=== Preseason ===
2025 preseason game log
Total: 1–3 (Home: 1–1; Road: 0–2)
Preseason: 1–3 (home: 1–1; road: 0–2)

Game	Date	Team	Score	High points	High rebounds	High assists	Location Attendance	Record
1	October 8	@ Houston	L 127–140	Ace Bailey (25)	Jusuf Nurkić (8)	Keyonte George (9)	Toyota Center; 15,785	0–1
2	October 10	@ San Antonio	L 130–134 (OT)	Brice Sensabaugh (26)	Keyonte George (9)	Keyonte George (8)	Frost Bank Center; 17,828	0–2
3	October 13	Dallas	L 101–114	Brice Sensabaugh (16)	Jusuf Nurkić (15)	Walter Clayton Jr. (7)	Delta Center; 13,182	0–3
4	October 16	Portland	W 132–129	Keyonte George (20)	Walker Kessler (10)	Walker Kessler (8)	Delta Center; 13,339	1–3

2025–26 preseason schedule

=== Regular season ===
2025–26 game log
Total: 22–60 (Home: 14–27; Road: 8–33)
October: 2–3 (home: 2–1; road: 0–2)

Game	Date	Team	Score	High points	High rebounds	High assists	Location Attendance	Record
1	October 22	L.A. Clippers	W 129–108	Walker Kessler (22)	Walker Kessler (9)	Keyonte George (9)	Delta Center; 20,122	1–0
2	October 24	@ Sacramento	L 104–105	Lauri Markkanen (33)	Jusuf Nurkić (11)	Keyonte George (10)	Golden 1 Center; 17,832	1–1
3	October 27	Phoenix	W 138–134 (OT)	Lauri Markkanen (51)	Lauri Markkanen (14)	Keyonte George (10)	Delta Center; 18,186	2–1
4	October 29	Portland	L 134–136	Lauri Markkanen (32)	Walker Kessler (12)	Keyonte George (8)	Delta Center; 18,186	2–2
5	October 31	@ Phoenix	L 96–118	Lauri Markkanen (33)	Walker Kessler (13)	Keyonte George (9)	Mortgage Matchup Center; 17,071	2–3

November: 4–10 (home: 3–5; road: 1–5)

Game	Date	Team	Score	High points	High rebounds	High assists	Location Attendance	Record
6	November 2	@ Charlotte	L 103–126	Lauri Markkanen (29)	Jusuf Nurkić (9)	Keyonte George (7)	Spectrum Center; 17,123	2–4
7	November 3	@ Boston	W 105–103	Keyonte George (31)	Jusuf Nurkić (11)	Walter Clayton Jr. (6)	TD Garden; 19,156	3–4
8	November 5	@ Detroit	L 103–114	Svi Mykhailiuk (28)	Jusuf Nurkić (17)	Walter Clayton Jr. (6)	Little Caesars Arena; 18,403	3–5
9	November 7	@ Minnesota	L 97–137	Keyonte George (18)	Kyle Filipowski (10)	Anderson, Nurkić (4)	Target Center; 17,924	3–6
10	November 10	Minnesota	L 113–120	Keyonte George (27)	Jusuf Nurkić (10)	Isaiah Collier (7)	Delta Center; 18,186	3–7
11	November 11	Indiana	W 152–128	Lauri Markkanen (35)	Jusuf Nurkić (11)	Isaiah Collier (11)	Delta Center; 18,186	4–7
12	November 13	Atlanta	L 122–132	Lauri Markkanen (40)	Jusuf Nurkić (10)	Jusuf Nurkić (8)	Delta Center; 18,186	4–8
13	November 16	Chicago	W 150–147 (2OT)	Lauri Markkanen (47)	Jusuf Nurkić (14)	Isaiah Collier (9)	Delta Center; 18,186	5–8
14	November 18	@ L.A. Lakers	L 126–140	Keyonte George (34)	Jusuf Nurkić (10)	Keyonte George (8)	Crypto.com Arena; 18,997	5–9
15	November 21	Oklahoma City	L 112–144	Keyonte George (20)	Jusuf Nurkić (10)	Keyonte George (8)	Delta Center; 18,186	5–10
16	November 23	L.A. Lakers	L 106–108	Keyonte George (27)	Jusuf Nurkić (10)	Keyonte George (8)	Delta Center; 18,186	5–11
17	November 24	@ Golden State	L 117–134	Keyonte George (28)	Jusuf Nurkić (9)	Keyonte George (8)	Chase Center; 18,064	5–12
18	November 28	Sacramento	W 128–119	Keyonte George (31)	Jusuf Nurkić (11)	Jusuf Nurkić (9)	Delta Center; 18,186	6–12
19	November 30	Houston	L 101–129	Ace Bailey (19)	Filipowski, Markkanen (8)	Jusuf Nurkić (9)	Delta Center; 18,186	6–13

December: 6–7 (home: 3–5; road: 3–2)

Game	Date	Team	Score	High points	High rebounds	High assists	Location Attendance	Record
20	December 1	Houston	W 133–125	Lauri Markkanen (29)	Jusuf Nurkić (9)	Keyonte George (8)	Delta Center; 18,186	7–13
21	December 4	@ Brooklyn	W 123–110	Lauri Markkanen (30)	Filipowski, Markkanen (8)	Keyonte George (10)	Barclays Center; 16,485	8–13
22	December 5	@ New York	L 112–146	George, Markkanen (18)	Lauri Markkanen (9)	Isaiah Collier (7)	Madison Square Garden; 19,812	8–14
23	December 7	Oklahoma City	L 101–131	Kyle Filipowski (21)	Kyle Filipowski (10)	Walter Clayton Jr. (9)	Delta Center; 18,186	8–15
24	December 12	@ Memphis	W 130–126	Keyonte George (39)	Jusuf Nurkić (17)	Collier, George (8)	FedExForum; 15,502	9–15
25	December 15	Dallas	W 140–133 (OT)	Keyonte George (37)	Lauri Markkanen (16)	Isaiah Collier (8)	Delta Center; 18,186	10–15
26	December 18	L.A. Lakers	L 135–143	Keyonte George (34)	Kyle Filipowski (13)	Isaiah Collier (13)	Delta Center; 18,186	10–16
27	December 20	Orlando	L 127–128 (OT)	Keyonte George (27)	Kevin Love (16)	Collier, George (9)	Delta Center; 18,186	10–17
28	December 22	@ Denver	L 112–135	Lauri Markkanen (27)	Jusuf Nurkić (14)	Isaiah Collier (9)	Ball Arena; 19,887	10–18
29	December 23	Memphis	L 128–137	Kyle Filipowski (25)	Kyle Filipowski (13)	Isaiah Collier (9)	Delta Center; 18,186	10–19
30	December 26	Detroit	W 131–129	Keyonte George (31)	Jusuf Nurkić (11)	Isaiah Collier (9)	Delta Center; 18,186	11–19
31	December 27	@ San Antonio	W 127–114	Lauri Markkanen (29)	Jusuf Nurkić (7)	Tied (6)	Frost Bank Center; 19,060	12–19
32	December 30	Boston	L 119–129	Keyonte George (37)	Lauri Markkanen (9)	Collier, Nurkić (8)	Delta Center; 18,186	12–20

January: 3–14 (home: 2–6; road: 1–8)

Game	Date	Team	Score	High points	High rebounds	High assists	Location Attendance	Record
33	January 1	@ L.A. Clippers	L 101–118	Kyle Anderson (22)	Kyle Anderson (8)	Isaiah Collier (10)	Intuit Dome; 17,927	12–21
34	January 3	@ Golden State	L 114–123	Lauri Markkanen (35)	Kevin Love (10)	Keyonte George (9)	Chase Center; 18,064	12–22
35	January 5	@ Portland	L 117–137	Lauri Markkanen (22)	Jusuf Nurkić (12)	Isaiah Collier (8)	Moda Center; 16,785	12–23
36	January 7	@ Oklahoma City	L 125–129 (OT)	Lauri Markkanen (29)	Jusuf Nurkić (15)	Keyonte George (11)	Paycom Center; 18,203	12–24
37	January 8	Dallas	W 116–114	Lauri Markkanen (33)	Kevin Love (10)	Keyonte George (7)	Delta Center; 18,186	13–24
38	January 10	Charlotte	L 95–150	Brice Sensabaugh (26)	Kyle Filipowski (10)	Isaiah Collier (9)	Delta Center; 18,186	13–25
39	January 12	@ Cleveland	W 123–112	Keyonte George (32)	Jusuf Nurkić (17)	Keyonte George (9)	Rocket Arena; 19,432	14–25
40	January 14	@ Chicago	L 126–128	Brice Sensabaugh (43)	Filipowski, Williams (7)	Keyonte George (7)	United Center; 18,859	14–26
41	January 15	@ Dallas	L 122–144	Brice Sensabaugh (27)	Anderson, Williams (6)	Isaiah Collier (12)	American Airlines Center; 18,613	14–27
42	January 17	@ Dallas	L 120–138	Keyonte George (29)	Kyle Filipowski (12)	Walter Clayton Jr. (8)	American Airlines Center; 20,031	14–28
43	January 19	@ San Antonio	L 110–123	Keyonte George (30)	Kevin Love (11)	Walter Clayton Jr. (7)	Frost Bank Center; 18,354	14–29
44	January 20	Minnesota	W 127–122	Keyonte George (43)	Jusuf Nurkić (18)	Collier, Nurkić (10)	Delta Center; 18,186	15–29
45	January 22	San Antonio	L 109–126	Ace Bailey (25)	Jusuf Nurkić (11)	Jusuf Nurkić (14)	Delta Center; 18,186	15–30
46	January 24	Miami	L 116–147	Brice Sensabaugh (23)	Jusuf Nurkić (10)	Jusuf Nurkić (12)	Delta Center; 18,186	15–31
47	January 27	L.A. Clippers	L 103–115	Ace Bailey (20)	Kevin Love (11)	Isaiah Collier (9)	Delta Center; 18,186	15–32
48	January 28	Golden State	L 124–140	Brice Sensabaugh (22)	Bailey, George (7)	Keyonte George (7)	Delta Center; 18,186	15–33
49	January 30	Brooklyn	L 99–109	Keyonte George (26)	Kyle Filipowski (12)	Collier, George (7)	Delta Center; 18,186	15–34

February: 3–8 (home: 1–3; road: 2–5)

Game	Date	Team	Score	High points	High rebounds	High assists	Location Attendance	Record
50	February 1	@ Toronto	L 100–107	Lauri Markkanen (27)	Jusuf Nurkić (13)	Isaiah Collier (7)	Scotiabank Arena; 18,749	15–35
51	February 3	@ Indiana	W 131–122	Lauri Markkanen (27)	Kyle Filipowski (16)	Isaiah Collier (22)	Gainbridge Fieldhouse; 16,678	16–35
52	February 5	@ Atlanta	L 119–121	Isaiah Collier (25)	Kyle Filipowski (17)	Isaiah Collier (11)	State Farm Arena; 15,412	16–36
53	February 7	@ Orlando	L 117–120	Lauri Markkanen (27)	Jusuf Nurkić (14)	Isaiah Collier (10)	Kia Center; 19,203	16–37
54	February 9	@ Miami	W 115–111	Jaren Jackson Jr. (22)	Jusuf Nurkić (16)	Isaiah Collier (9)	Kaseya Center; 19,700	17–37
55	February 11	Sacramento	W 121–93	Jaren Jackson Jr. (23)	Love, Nurkić (9)	Isaiah Collier (14)	Delta Center; 18,186	18–37
56	February 12	Portland	L 119–135	Brice Sensabaugh (28)	Kyle Filipowski (9)	Isaiah Collier (9)	Delta Center; 18,186	18–38
All-Star Game
57	February 20	@ Memphis	L 114–123	Isaiah Collier (24)	Cody Williams (9)	Isaiah Collier (5)	FedExForum; 16,112	18–39
58	February 23	@ Houston	L 105–125	Lauri Markkanen (29)	Kevin Love (9)	Kevin Love (5)	Toyota Center; 18,055	18–40
59	February 26	New Orleans	L 118–129	Ace Bailey (23)	Kevin Love (8)	Isaiah Collier (7)	Delta Center; 18,186	18–41
60	February 28	New Orleans	L 105–115	Isaiah Collier (21)	Ace Bailey (8)	Isaiah Collier (7)	Delta Center; 18,186	18–42

March: 3–13 (home: 2–6; road: 1–7)

Game	Date	Team	Score	High points	High rebounds	High assists	Location Attendance	Record
61	March 2	Denver	L 125–128	Keyonte George (36)	Filipowski, Tshiebwe (8)	Collier, Filipowski (6)	Delta Center; 18,186	18–43
62	March 4	@ Philadelphia	L 102–106	Keyonte George (30)	Kyle Filipowski (11)	Isaiah Collier (5)	Xfinity Mobile Arena; 18,386	18–44
63	March 5	@ Washington	W 122–112	Ace Bailey (32)	Kyle Filipowski (14)	Isaiah Collier (11)	Capital One Arena; 17,689	19–44
64	March 7	@ Milwaukee	L 99–113	Keyonte George (22)	Filipowski, Williams (11)	Kyle Filipowski (6)	Fiserv Forum; 16,020	19–45
65	March 9	Golden State	W 119–116	Brice Sensabaugh (21)	Kyle Filipowski (15)	Cody Williams (7)	Delta Center; 18,186	20–45
66	March 11	New York	L 117–134	Brice Sensabaugh (29)	Andersson Garcia (9)	Tied (5)	Delta Center; 18,186	20–46
67	March 13	@ Portland	L 114–124	Brice Sensabaugh (31)	Cody Williams (7)	Isaiah Collier (9)	Moda Center; 17,352	20–47
68	March 15	@ Sacramento	L 111–116	Cody Williams (34)	Andersson Garcia (11)	Cody Williams (7)	Golden 1 Center; 15,132	20–48
69	March 18	@ Minnesota	L 111–149	Brice Sensabaugh (41)	Andersson Garcia (8)	Isaiah Collier (6)	Target Center; 17,047	20–49
70	March 19	Milwaukee	W 128–96	Ace Bailey (33)	Andersson Garcia (11)	Elijah Harkless (10)	Delta Center; 18,186	21–49
71	March 21	Philadelphia	L 116–126	Ace Bailey (25)	Ace Bailey (7)	Bez Mbeng (7)	Delta Center; 18,186	21–50
72	March 23	Toronto	L 127–143	Ace Bailey (37)	Kyle Filipowski (8)	Kennedy Chandler (9)	Delta Center; 18,186	21–51
73	March 25	Washington	L 110–133	Cody Williams (24)	John Konchar (14)	Kennedy Chandler (8)	Delta Center; 18,186	21–52
74	March 27	@ Denver	L 129–135	Kyle Filipowski (25)	Oscar Tshiebwe (9)	Chandler, Williams (7)	Ball Arena; 19,647	21–53
75	March 28	@ Phoenix	L 109–134	Filipowski, Sensabaugh (26)	Kyle Filipowski (9)	Kennedy Chandler (8)	Mortgage Matchup Center; 17,071	21–54
76	March 30	Cleveland	L 113–122	Cody Williams (26)	Kyle Filipowski (10)	Tied (5)	Delta Center; 18,186	21–55

April: 1–5 (home: 1–1; road: 0–4)

Game	Date	Team	Score	High points	High rebounds	High assists	Location Attendance	Record
77	April 1	Denver	L 117–130	Brice Sensabaugh (28)	Kyle Filipowski (12)	Cody Williams (9)	Delta Center	21–56
78	April 3	@ Houston	L 106–140	Cody Williams (27)	Cody Williams (11)	Brice Sensabaugh (5)	Toyota Center; 18,055	21–57
79	April 5	@ Oklahoma City	L 111–146	Brice Sensabaugh (34)	Kyle Filipowski (14)	Kyle Filipowski (6)	Paycom Center; 18,203	21–58
80	April 7	@ New Orleans	L 137–156	Kennedy Chandler (31)	John Konchar (10)	John Konchar (10)	Smoothie King Center; 15,971	21–59
81	April 10	Memphis	W 147–101	Blake Hinson (30)	Oscar Tshiebwe (22)	Bez Mbeng (11)	Delta Center; 18,186	22–59
82	April 12	@ L.A. Lakers	L 107–131	Oscar Tshiebwe (29)	Oscar Tshiebwe (17)	Bez Mbeng (9)	Crypto.com Arena; 18,791	22–60

2025–26 season schedule

=== NBA Cup ===
==== West Group A ====
Pos	Team	Pld	W	L	PF	PA	PD	Qualification
1	Oklahoma City Thunder	4	4	0	512	437	+75	Advanced to knockout rounds
2	Phoenix Suns	4	3	1	463	432	+31	Advanced to knockout rounds
3	Minnesota Timberwolves	4	2	2	479	434	+45	
4	Utah Jazz	4	1	3	433	518	−85	
5	Sacramento Kings	4	0	4	430	496	−66	

Source: NBA

== Player statistics ==
Legend
GP	Games played	GS	Games started	MPG	Minutes per game
FG%	Field-goal percentage	3P%	3-point field-goal percentage	FT%	Free-throw percentage
RPG	Rebounds per game	APG	Assists per game	SPG	Steals per game
BPG	Blocks per game	PPG	Points per game

=== Regular season ===
Utah Jazz statistics
Player	GP	GS	MPG	FG%	3P%	FT%	RPG	APG	SPG	BPG	PPG
Kyle Anderson^{†}	20	0	20.1	.523	.600	.658	3.3	3.1	1.2	.5	7.1
Ace Bailey	72	61	27.6	.443	.344	.750	4.2	1.8	.8	.7	13.8
Mo Bamba^{†}	2	0	19.0	.556			10.0	.5	.0	1.0	5.0
Kennedy Chandler	11	2	32.3	.445	.395	.651	3.4	6.7	1.0	.2	15.0
Walter Clayton Jr.^{†}	45	0	18.0	.398	.308	.935	2.0	3.2	.5	.3	6.8
Isaiah Collier	59	19	25.7	.495	.270	.722	2.5	7.2	1.1	.3	11.7
Kyle Filipowski	77	41	23.4	.492	.325	.750	7.2	2.6	.9	.5	11.4
Andersson Garcia	5	2	33.8	.310	.077	.778	8.4	2.8	1.6	.8	5.2
Keyonte George	54	54	33.1	.456	.371	.892	3.7	6.1	1.1	.3	23.6
Hayden Gray	1	0	25.0	.667	.000	1.000	.0	1.0	1.0	1.0	6.0
Elijah Harkless	26	9	21.0	.335	.239	.766	2.0	2.9	1.2	.2	6.8
Taylor Hendricks^{†}	33	6	14.9	.453	.343	.719	3.0	.7	.4	.2	4.9
Blake Hinson	14	3	20.4	.513	.468	.750	2.4	1.1	.4	.1	11.9
Jaren Jackson Jr.^{†}	3	3	24.0	.490	.333	.875	4.3	2.7	2.0	.3	22.3
Walker Kessler	5	5	30.8	.703	.750	.700	10.8	3.0	1.4	1.8	14.4
John Konchar^{†}	26	7	26.2	.445	.250	.774	5.7	3.0	2.0	1.0	5.9
Kevin Love	37	5	16.6	.397	.373	.841	5.8	1.8	.4	.2	6.7
Lauri Markkanen	42	42	34.4	.477	.355	.896	6.9	2.1	1.0	.5	26.7
Bez Mbeng	15	5	32.8	.500	.194	.640	3.8	4.1	2.3	.3	8.1
Svi Mykhailiuk	50	41	23.1	.478	.408	.893	2.5	1.9	.5	.1	9.4
Jusuf Nurkić	41	36	26.4	.503	.352	.549	10.4	4.8	1.3	.5	10.9
Brice Sensabaugh	75	22	23.5	.460	.367	.826	3.1	1.9	.7	.2	14.9
Oscar Tshiebwe	27	6	16.6	.634		.551	6.6	1.2	.6	.2	7.8
Cody Williams	67	41	24.3	.468	.214	.706	3.0	2.0	.8	.4	8.8
Vince Williams Jr.^{†}	6	0	14.0	.357	.333	.500	3.2	2.7	.3	.3	4.7

- ^{†} Denotes player spent time with another team in the season. Stats reflect time with the Jazz only.

== Transactions ==
=== Trades ===
Date	Trade		Ref.
June 25, 2025	To Utah Jazz: Draft rights to Walter Clayton Jr. (No. 18)	To Washington Wizards: Draft rights to Will Riley (No. 21); Draft rights to Jamir Watkins (No. 43); 2025 second-round pick (No. 43) [from Utah]; 2031 second-round pick; 2032 second-round pick (from Utah)	
June 29, 2025	To Charlotte Hornets: Collin Sexton; 2030 second-round pick (Note: The more favorable of the picks originally belonging to LA Clippers and Utah.)	To Utah Jazz: Jusuf Nurkić	
July 7, 2025	Three-team trade		
July 7, 2025	To Los Angeles Clippers: John Collins	To Miami Heat: Norman Powell	
July 7, 2025	To Utah Jazz: Kyle Anderson; Kevin Love; 2027 second-round pick (from LA Clippers)		
August 6, 2025	To Boston Celtics: RJ Luis Jr. (two-way contract)	To Utah Jazz: Georges Niang; 2027 second-round pick (Note: The more favorable of the picks originally belonging to Boston and Orlando.); 2031 second-round pick (Note: The more favorable of the picks originally belonging to Boston and Cleveland.)	
February 3, 2026	To Memphis Grizzlies: Walter Clayton Jr.; Kyle Anderson; Taylor Hendricks; Georges Niang; 2027 protected first-round pick (from LA Lakers) (Note: Memphis will receive the LA Lakers' 2027 first-round pick if it's No. 5–30.); 2027 first-round pick (Note: The most favorable of the picks originally belonging to Cleveland, Minnesota, and Utah.); 2031 first-round pick (from Phoenix)	To Utah Jazz: Jaren Jackson Jr.; Jock Landale; John Konchar; Vince Williams Jr.	
February 4, 2026	To Utah Jazz: Cash considerations	To Oklahoma City Thunder: Draft rights to Balša Koprivica (2021 No. 57)	
February 5, 2026	Three-team trade		
February 5, 2026	To Utah Jazz: Lonzo Ball; 2028 second-round pick (from Cleveland); 2032 second-round pick (from Cleveland); Cash considerations	To Atlanta Hawks: Jock Landale	
February 5, 2026	To Cleveland Cavaliers: Cash considerations		
February 5, 2026	To Utah Jazz: Chris Boucher; 2027 second-round pick (from Denver); Cash considerations	To Boston Celtics: John Tonje (two-way contract)	

=== Free agency ===
==== Subtractions ====
Player	Reason	New Team	Ref.
Jordan Clarkson	Waived	New York Knicks	
Johnny Juzang	Waived	Minnesota Timberwolves	
