= Andersson Garcia =

Dominican basketball player (born 2000)

No. 11 – Río Breogán
- Position: Small forward
- League: Liga ACB

Personal information
- Born: August 23, 2000 (age 26) Moca, Dominican Republic
- Listed height: 6 ft 7 in (2.01 m)
- Listed weight: 220 lb (100 kg)

Career information
- High school: Hamilton Heights Christian Academy (Chattanooga, Tennessee, U.S.)
- College: Mississippi State (2020–2022); Texas A&M (2022–2025)
- NBA draft: 2025: undrafted
- Playing career: 2025–present

Career history
- 2025: Marineros de Puerto Plata
- 2025–2026: Mexico City Capitanes
- 2026: Utah Jazz
- 2026–present: Río Breogán

Career highlights
- NBA G League All Defensive Team (2026)
- Stats at NBA.com
- Stats at Basketball Reference

Andersson Mejia Garcia (born August 23, 2000) is a Dominican professional basketball player for Río Breogán of the Liga ACB. He played college basketball for the Mississippi State Bulldogs and the Texas A&M Aggies.

== Early life and high school career ==
Andersson Garcia was born on August 23, 2000, in Moca, Dominican Republic. As a child in the Dominican Republic, he played baseball more than any other sport, but stopped playing after growing afraid of fast pitches. He started playing basketball at age 11 when a coach invited him to play in a tournament.

After being scouted at a basketball camp in the Dominican Republic, Garcia attended Hamilton Heights Christian Academy in Chattanooga, Tennessee.

== College career ==
Garcia signed with the Mississippi State Bulldogs after developing a bond with assistant coach Korey McCray.

On May 13, 2022, Garcia signed with the Texas A&M Aggies.

In the 2023–24 season, Garcia was the only Power Five player to reach 300 rebounds, 200 points, 50 assists, 40 steals, and 20 blocks in the season. He holds the Texas A&M record for most rebounds in a season, and was granted the nickname "Dominican Dennis Rodman" by his then-coach Buzz Williams.

== Professional career ==
In 2025, Garcia joined the Marineros de Puerto Plata of the Liga Nacional de Baloncesto, the top professional basketball league in the Dominican Republic. In the 2025 season, the league named him Rookie of the Year.

Following his success on the Marineros de Puerto Plata, Garcia was signed to the Mexico City Capitanes of the NBA G League for the 2025–26 season, where he played alongside former Texas A&M teammate Wade Taylor IV.

On March 11, 2026, the Utah Jazz signed Garcia to a 10-day contract. On March 15, Garcia made his first career start, recording three points, 11 rebounds, three assists, and two steals in a 111–116 loss to the Sacramento Kings.

On July 14, 2026, Garcia signed with Río Breogán of the Liga ACB.

== Career statistics ==
Legend
GP	Games played	GS	Games started	MPG	Minutes per game
FG%	Field goal percentage	3P%	3-point field goal percentage	FT%	Free throw percentage
RPG	Rebounds per game	APG	Assists per game	SPG	Steals per game
BPG	Blocks per game	PPG	Points per game	**Bold**	Career high

=== NBA ===
Year	Team	GP	GS	MPG	FG%	3P%	FT%	RPG	APG	SPG	BPG	PPG
2025–26	Utah	5	2	33.8	.310	.077	.778	8.4	2.8	1.6	.8	5.2
Career		5	2	33.8	.310	.077	.778	8.4	2.8	1.6	.8	5.2

=== College ===
Year	Team	GP	GS	MPG	FG%	3P%	FT%	RPG	APG	SPG	BPG	PPG
2020–21	Mississippi State	11	0	3.3	**.611**	**.500**	.250	1.1	.4	.4	.1	2.3
2021–22	Mississippi State	33	3	14.7	.544	.313	.580	4.2	1.4	1.1	.2	4.3
2022–23	Texas A&M	34	1	16.5	.508	.400	**.717**	4.4	.8	.6	.2	3.2
2023–24	Texas A&M	**36**	4	**28.5**	.552	.450	.705	**9.1**	1.5	**1.3**	**.7**	6.0
2024–25	Texas A&M	34	**11**	24.4	.489	.386	.696	6.2	**1.6**	1.0	.6	**6.1**
Career		148	19	19.9	.526	.393	.672	5.7	1.3	1.0	.4	4.7
