= Elijah Harkless =

American basketball player (born 2000)

No. 94 – Detroit Pistons
- Position: Shooting guard
- League: NBA

Personal information
- Born: February 3, 2000 (age 26) San Bernardino, California, U.S.
- Listed height: 6 ft 3 in (1.91 m)
- Listed weight: 195 lb (88 kg)

Career information
- High school: Etiwanda (Rancho Cucamonga, California)
- College: Cal State Northridge (2018–2020); Oklahoma (2020–2022); UNLV (2022–2023)
- NBA draft: 2023: undrafted
- Playing career: 2023–present

Career history
- 2023–2024: Ontario Clippers
- 2024: Saskatchewan Rattlers
- 2024: San Diego Clippers
- 2025–2026: Utah Jazz
- 2025–2026: →Salt Lake City Stars
- 2026–present: Detroit Pistons
- 2026–present: →Motor City Cruise

Career highlights
- All-NBA G League Second Team (2025); NBA G League Most Improved Player (2025); Second-team All-MW (2023)
- Stats at NBA.com
- Stats at Basketball Reference

Elijah J. Harkless (born February 3, 2000) is an American professional basketball player for the Detroit Pistons of the National Basketball Association (NBA), on a two-way contract with the Motor City Cruise of the NBA G League. He played college basketball for the Cal State Northridge Matadors, Oklahoma Sooners and UNLV Runnin' Rebels. Harkless signed with the Ontario Clippers of the NBA G League after going undrafted in the 2023 NBA draft.

== High school career ==
Harkless attended Etiwanda High School at Rancho Cucamonga, California, leading his team to a 30–4 record and a third-place finish at the CIF Southern Section Open Division Tournament as a senior while averaging over 10 points and five assists. He was named to the All-Baseline First Team and to the Sun-Daily Bulletin All-Area Team.

== College career ==
Harkless initially attended Cal State Northridge (CSUN) where he played 51 games in two seasons while averaging 8.1 points, 4.5 rebounds, 2.6 assists and 1.4 steals in 23.6 minutes and in his sophomore year, he became the first CSUN player to record a triple-double and the first player since 2005 to get 54 steals in a single season.

As a junior, Harkless transferred to Oklahoma, where he played 49 games over two seasons and averaged 9.1 points, 4.7 rebounds, two assists and 1.6 steals in 28.8 minutes.

In his final season, Harkless transferred to UNLV, where he started in all 32 games and averaged a career-high 19.1 points, 5.1 rebounds, 3.4 assists and 1.6 steals in 30.9 minutes while leading his team in total points with 611, total rebounds with 163, total assists with 108, total minutes with 991 and total games.

== Professional career ==
=== Ontario Clippers (2023–2024) ===
After going undrafted in the 2023 NBA draft, Harkless joined the Ontario Clippers on October 30, 2023. He played 20 games and averaged 11.6 points, 3.9 rebounds, 3.2 assists and one steal in 22.6 minutes while shooting 47.5% from the field.

=== Saskatchewan Rattlers (2024) ===
On April 25, 2024, Harkless signed with the Saskatchewan Rattlers of the Canadian Elite Basketball League where he played 27 games and averaged 11.4 points, 3.7 rebounds, 2.9 assists and one steal in 20.7 minutes. On July 25, he was released by the Rattlers.

=== San Diego Clippers (2024) ===
After joining them for the 2024 NBA Summer League, on September 4, 2024, Harkless signed with the Los Angeles Clippers. However, he was waived on September 26 and re-signed on October 9. However, he was waived once again on October 19. On October 28, he joined the San Diego Clippers.

=== Utah Jazz / Salt Lake City Stars (2025–2026) ===
On January 1, 2025, Harkless signed a two-way contract with the Utah Jazz.

=== Detroit Pistons / Motor City Cruise (2026–present) ===
On July 9, 2026, Harkless signed a two–way contract with the Detroit Pistons.

== Career statistics ==
Legend
GP	Games played	GS	Games started	MPG	Minutes per game
FG%	Field goal percentage	3P%	3-point field goal percentage	FT%	Free throw percentage
RPG	Rebounds per game	APG	Assists per game	SPG	Steals per game
BPG	Blocks per game	PPG	Points per game	**Bold**	Career high

=== NBA ===
Year	Team	GP	GS	MPG	FG%	3P%	FT%	RPG	APG	SPG	BPG	PPG
2024–25	Utah	10	0	13.8	.314	**.280**	.500	2.1	.8	1.0	.1	3.2
2025–26	Utah	**26**	**9**	**21.0**	**.335**	.239	**.766**	2.0	**2.9**	**1.2**	**.2**	**6.8**
Career		36	9	19.0	.332	.248	.743	2.1	2.3	1.1	.2	5.8

=== College ===
Year	Team	GP	GS	MPG	FG%	3P%	FT%	RPG	APG	SPG	BPG	PPG
2018–19	Cal State Northridge	18	2	14.3	.417	.333	.509	2.5	2.1	.9	.1	3.9
2019–20	Cal State Northridge	**32**	23	29.5	**.455**	**.360**	.697	**5.8**	2.9	1.7	**.4**	10.7
2020–21	Oklahoma	23	17	28.7	.422	.321	.635	5.4	2.3	**1.9**	.3	8.1
2021–22	Oklahoma	26	23	29.0	.423	.323	.638	4.1	1.7	1.3	.2	10.0
2022–23	UNLV	**32**	**32**	**30.9**	.414	.286	**.778**	5.1	**3.4**	1.6	.2	**19.1**
Career		131	97	27.5	.426	.311	.699	4.8	2.6	1.5	.2	11.2

== Personal life ==
The youngest son of Sherice Sterling and Kevin Harkless. He has two brothers, Kevin and Aaron, and three sisters, Kreation, Lyniesha and LaTierra. He received a Bachelor's Degree in Communications from the University of Oklahoma in 2022.
