= Boyd-Buchanan School =

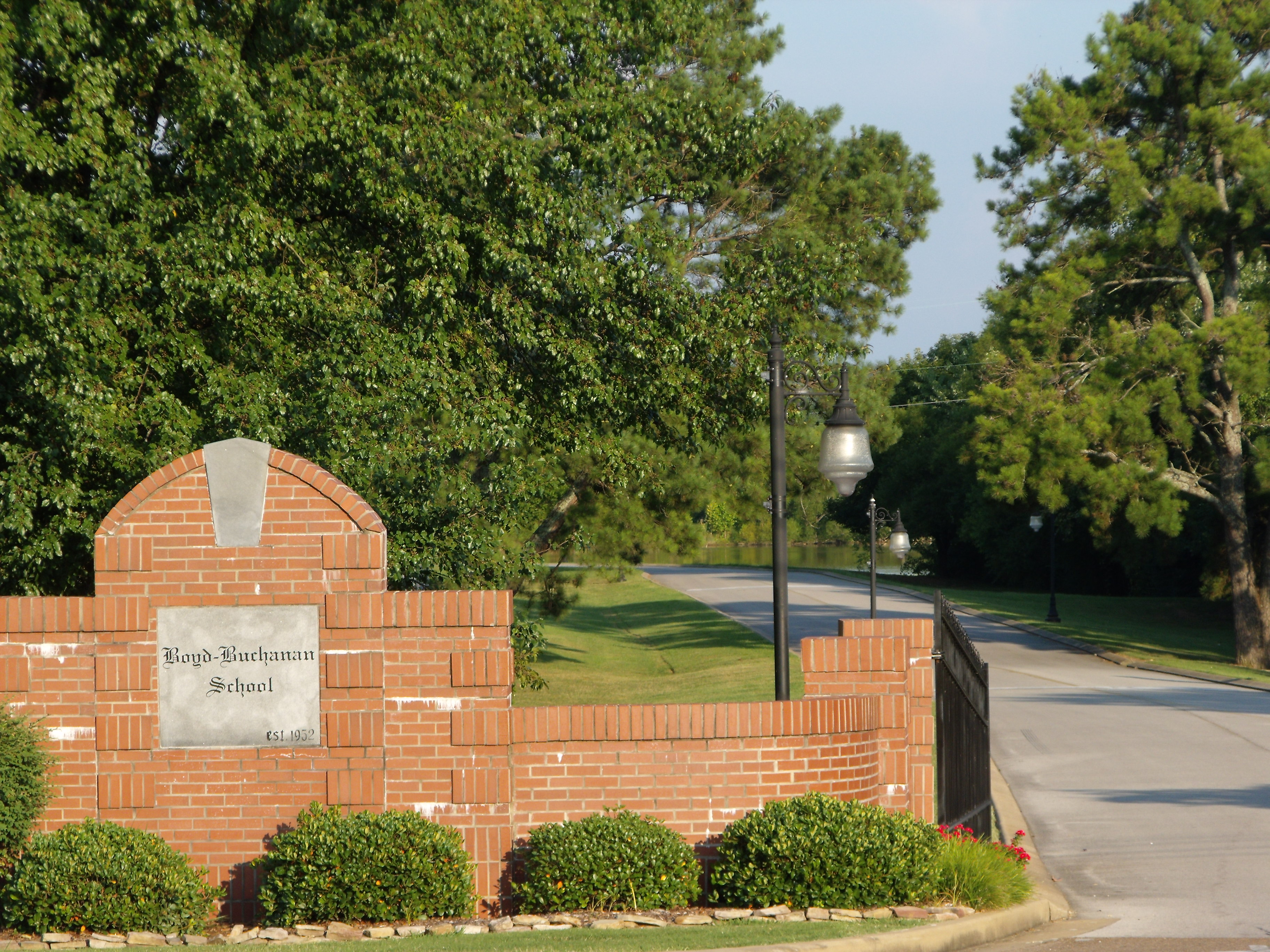

Location
- 4650 Buccaneer Trail; Chattanooga, Tennessee; United States
- Coordinates: 35.0409°N 85.2131°W

Information
- Type: Suburban, Private school, Independent School
- Religious affiliation: Christian
- Established: 1952
- CEEB code: 430276
- Principal: Lower, Stacy Risley; Middle, Ashley Cross; Upper, Renee Hood
- Head of school: Renee Murley
- Faculty: 100+
- Enrollment: 1,015
- Student to teacher ratio: 1:12
- Campus: 4650 Buccaneer Trail, Chattanooga, TN 37411
- Colors: Royal Blue & Gold
- Athletics conference: TSSAA IIA
- Mascot: Buccaneer
- Rival: Silverdale Academy
- Website: https://www.bbschool.org/

Boyd-Buchanan School is a co-educational private Christian school located near the Chattanooga Metropolitan Airport in Chattanooga, Tennessee. Founded in 1952, the school is a college-preparatory school for children in pre-kindergarten through grade 12. Currently, the school has more than 1,000 students enrolled.

== History ==
Boyd-Buchanan was founded in 1952 as the Chattanooga Bible School. It had been planned for almost a decade before the resources and students were available to start it. When the school opened on September 4, 1952, on Vine Street in downtown Chattanooga, it charged $3 per week as the fee for attendance and had 130 children in grades first through sixth.

In the summer of 1959, the school's board of directors changed the school name from the Chattanooga Bible School to Boyd-Buchanan as way to emphasize that the education the children received was not just about the Bible; their education included everything they needed to prepare them for further education and life in general after they left the school.

The school moved to its current campus off of Moore Road in the fall of 1961. By 1978, Boyd-Buchanan had extended its education program from prekindergarten-12th grade. The high school building was constructed in 1999-–which relieved some of the extreme crowding in other facilities, and the new field house was finished in time for the fall of 2006.

== Academics ==
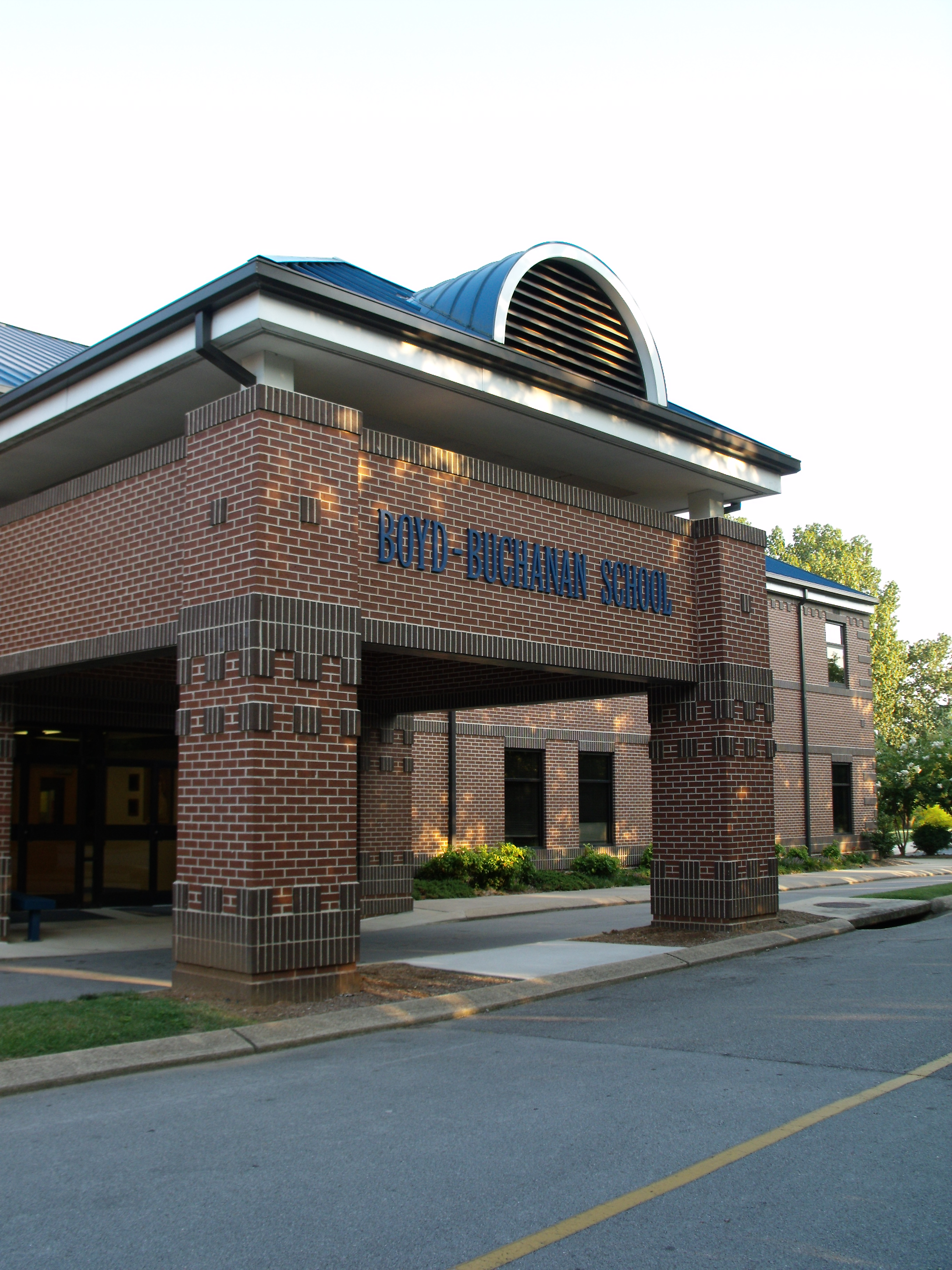
The Upper School entrance.

Boyd-Buchanan school is accredited by both the Tennessee Association of Independent Schools and the Southern Association of Colleges and Schools. The school is primarily based around college preparation and provides the necessary credits and coursework to fulfill the entrance requirements for a university. In addition to providing these classes, Boyd-Buchanan also offers a wide range of accelerated, honors, and Advanced Placement Classes.

Accelerated courses are usually taken during the freshman and sophomore years of high school, and they offer students the chance to challenge themselves mentally and intellectually. These courses move at a faster rate than their regular counterparts and are more challenging. The intent of these courses is to prepare students for A.P. classes when they advance into the upper division of the school.

The three honors courses currently offered at Boyd-Buchanan are: Honors Physics, Honors French IV, and Honors Pre-Cal. The first is to be converted to an A.P. course in the near future. An 'Honors' class denotes that the student will receive a 5.0 for an 'A' instead of a 4.0. In addition, these courses are far more rigorous than either regular or accelerated and cover much more material during a given amount of time.

Advanced Placement (A.P.) courses are classes which push students to do their best. These classes are typically smaller than any other classes and have more required coursework. This is because the goal is to learn everything that would be taught in comparable college classes so that the students can receive college credit. The credit is given out according to what score is received on a standardized test at the end of the year. They, too, receive a 5.0 for an 'A' in this course.

As of 2016, the school has sought out to increase the variety of subjects that the students are allowed to choose for their school year. These are the classes by type as of the 2016 school year.

Subject	Accelerated Courses	Honors Courses	Advanced Placement Courses
Math	Geometry, Algebra II	Pre-Calculus	Calculus AB
Science	Biology, Physics, Chemistry	Physics	Biology, Chemistry, Computer Science, Physics 1, Physics 2
English	English I, English II, English III, English IV		Literature, Language
Social Studies	World History, U.S. History, Geography, U.S. Government		U.S. History, U.S. Government & Politics, World History
Foreign Language	Spanish I, Spanish II, French I, French II	French IV	Spanish, French
Fine Art	Studio Art, Sculptures, Print Art, Music		Studio Art

== Athletics ==
Boyd Buchanan has a variety of athletic opportunities. The school is classified by the TSSAA in the IA school category, beginning in the fall of 2009. The sports that the school currently hosts are:

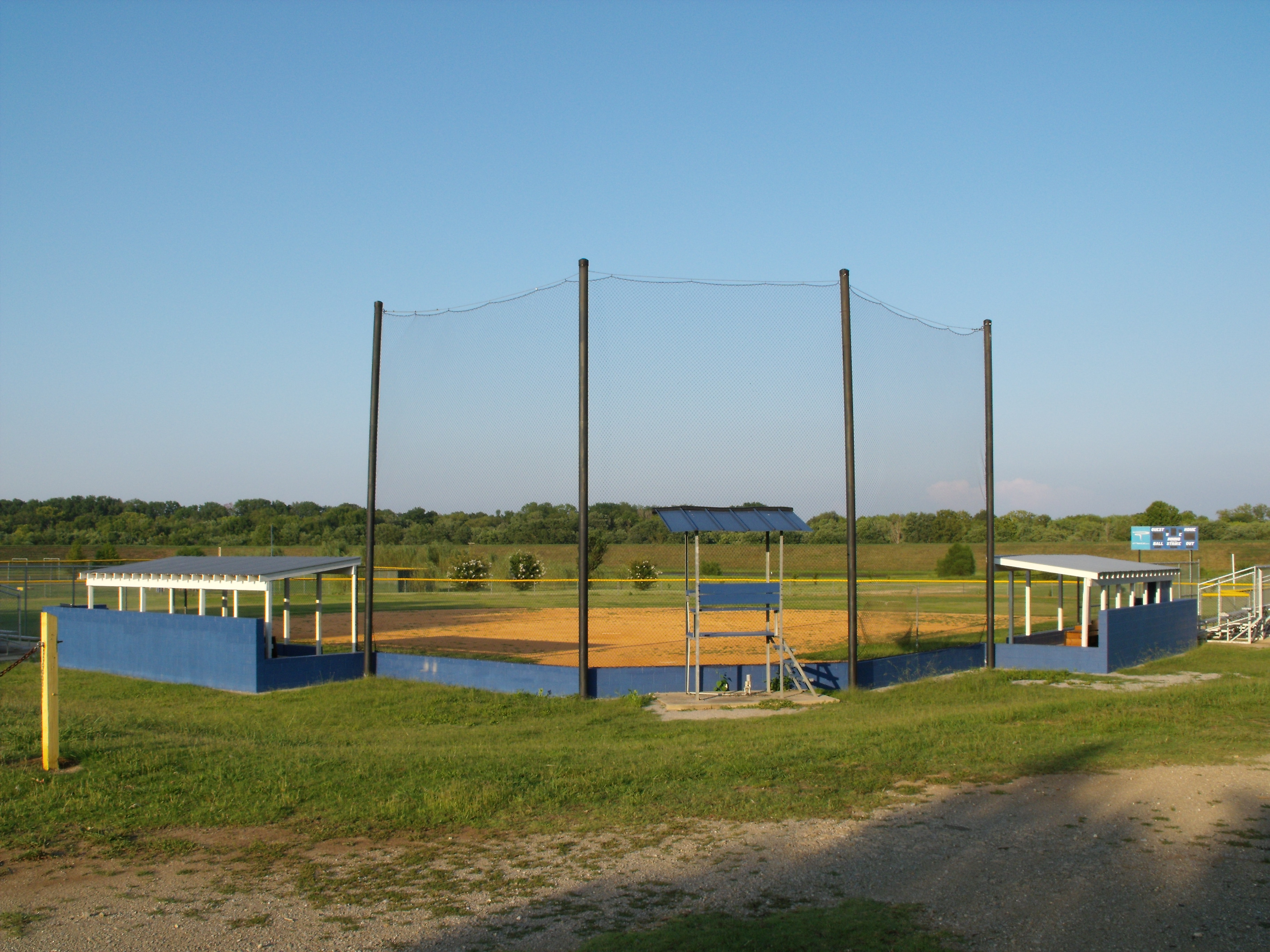
The softball field.

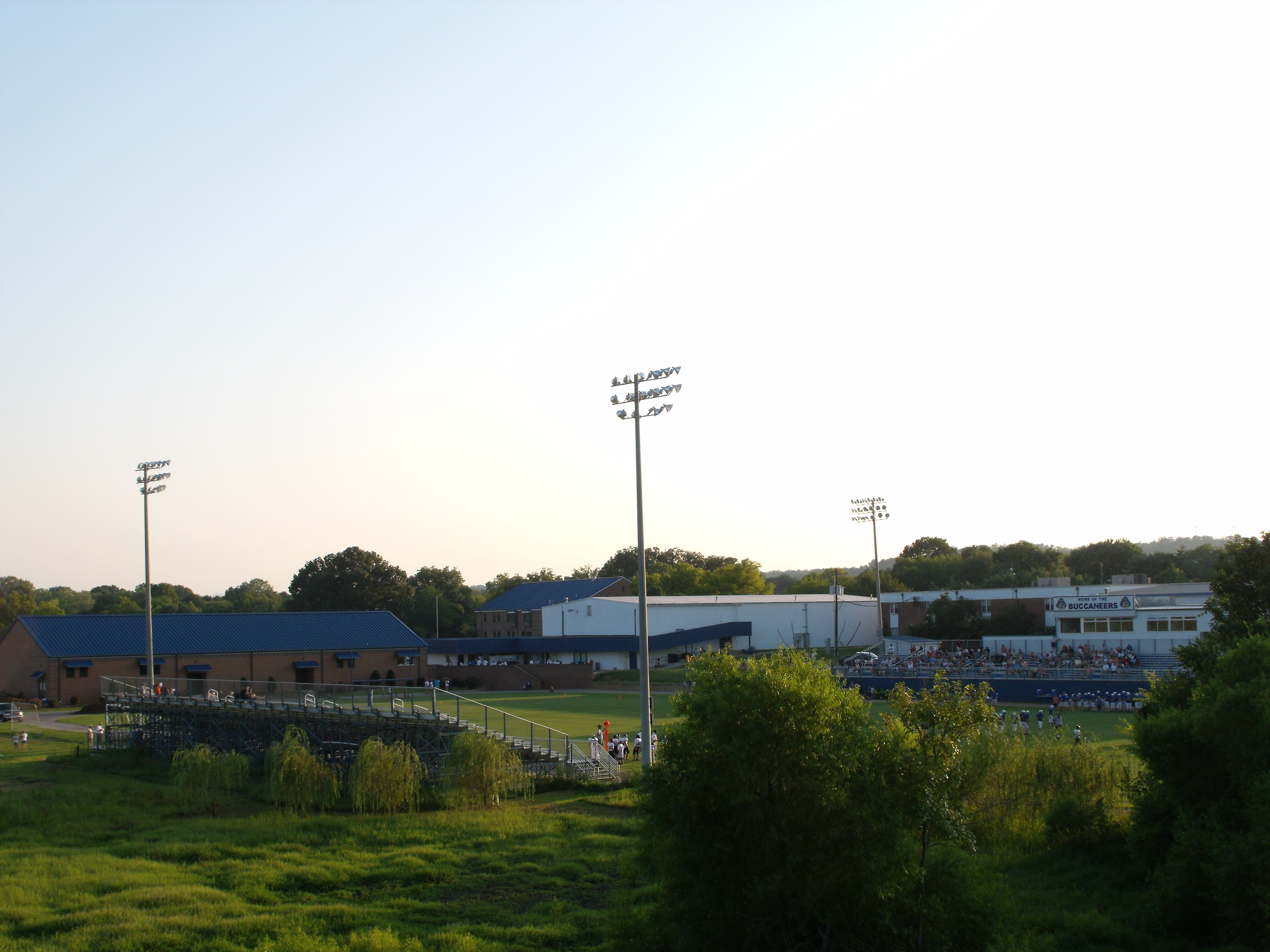
The football stadium.

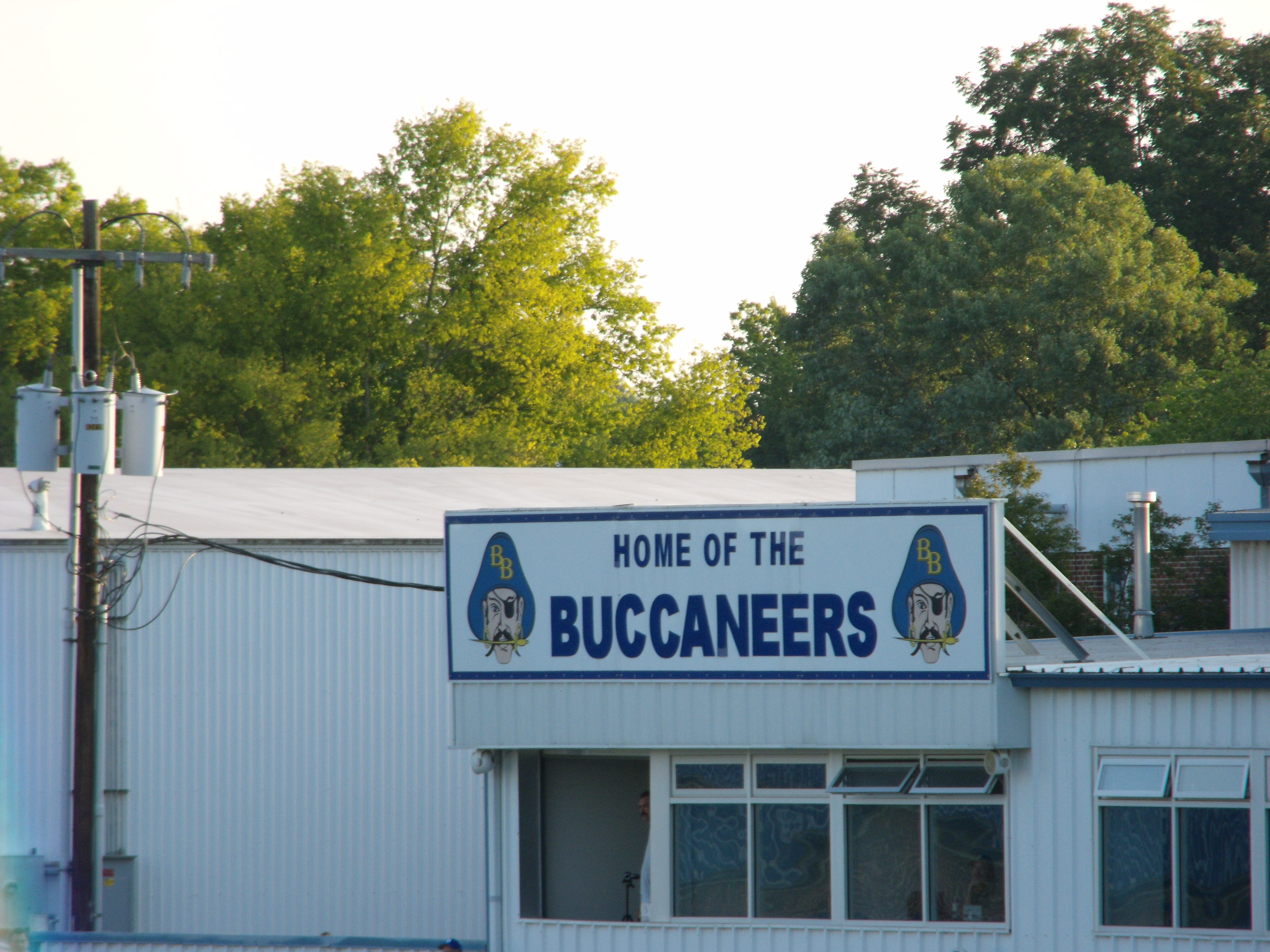
The banner over the press box in the football stadium.

Sport	Girls	Boys	Middle	High
Soccer	*	*	*	*
Basketball	*	*	*	*
Baseball		*	*	*
Softball	*		*	*
Football		*	*	*
Tennis	*	*	*	*
Cross-Country	*	*	*	*
Golf	*	*		*
Volleyball	*		*	*
Cheerleading	*		*	*
Wrestling	*	*	*	*
Lacrosse		*	*	*
Marching Band	*	*	*	*

== Enrollment ==
The average cost of attendance (the exact tuition varies based on grade level) for the 2009–2010 school year was $7198.25. More than 900 students attend Boyd-Buchanan with approximately 318 in high school. Since 2010, the tuition has risen to over $10,000.

== Campus ==
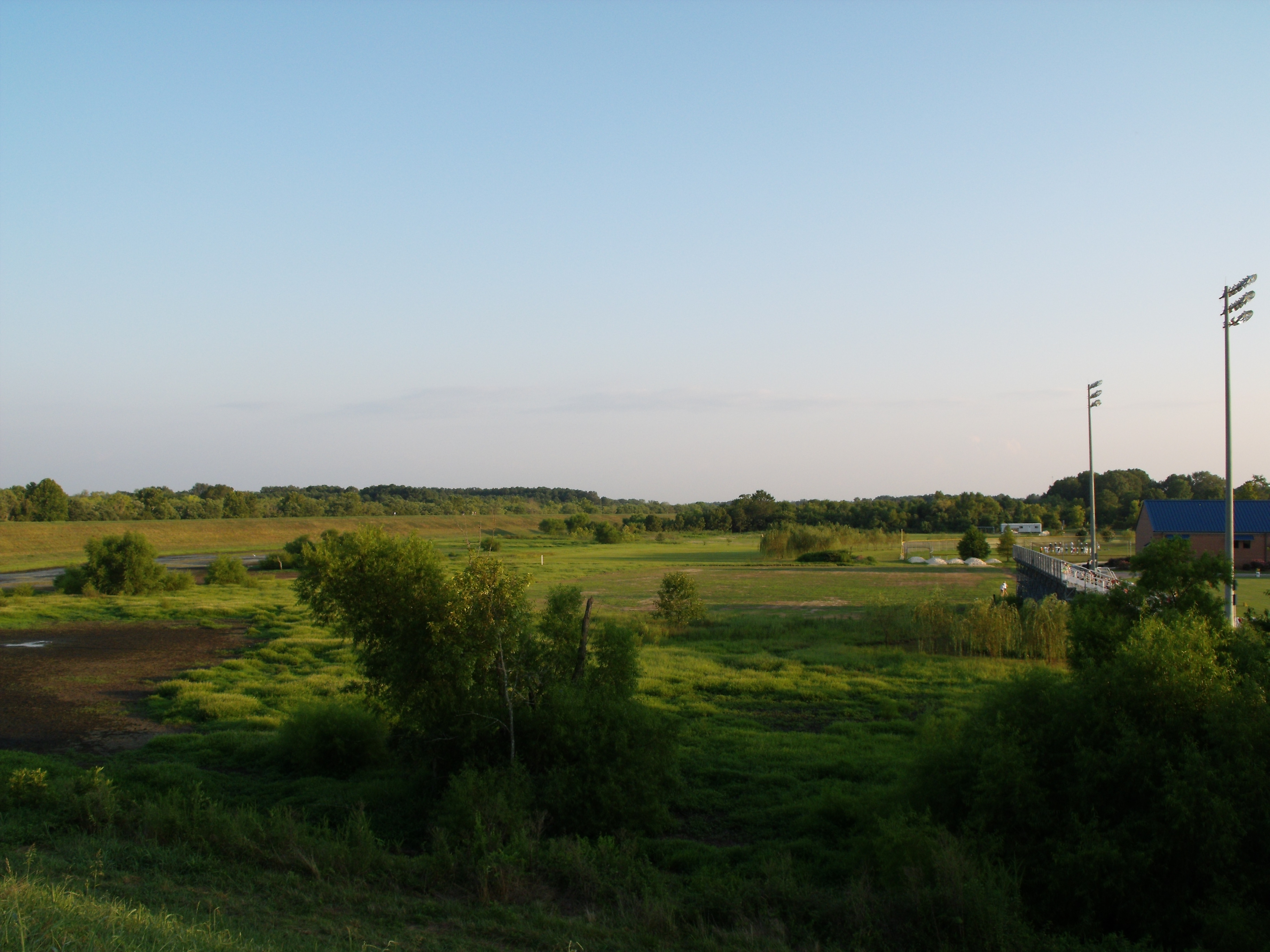
The wetland behind the football stadium and the levee.

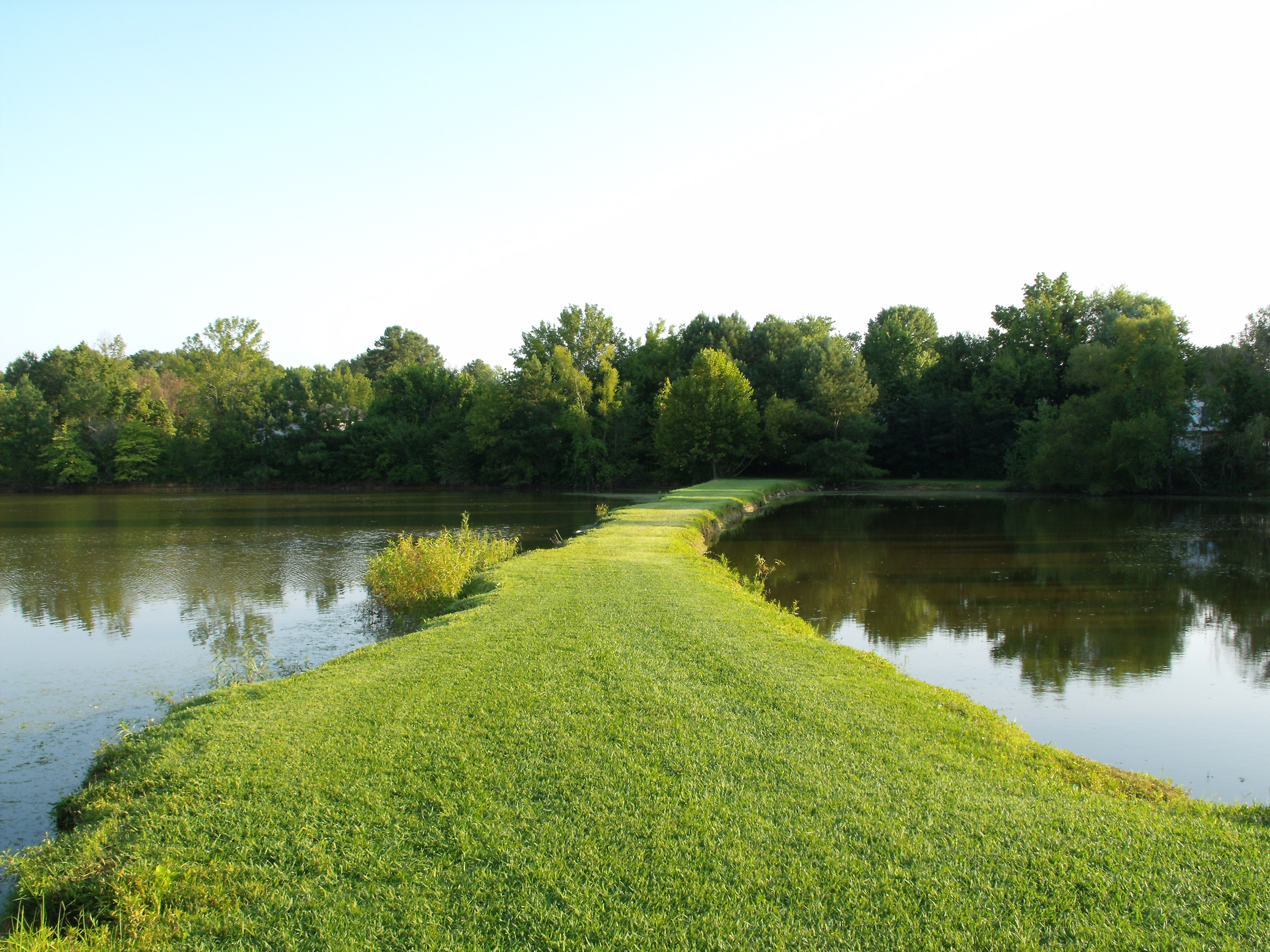
Land bridge over the pond.

The Boyd-Buchanan campus consists of sixty acres of land immediately adjacent to the Chattanooga Metropolitan Airport; access is granted via Moore Road. The school consists of five primary buildings: the elementary, middle school, high school, Colman's Cave and field house. In addition to this, there are two gymnasiums, a cafeteria, administrative building, student life center, athletics complex, football stadium, baseball field, softball field, and multiple practice fields. The outskirts of the campus are surrounded by a levee to prevent flooding from the nearby creek, and there is a large pond on one side of campus.

== Activities ==
|Marching band |Concert band |Concert chorus |Photography |Robotics |FFA
