= 2023–24 Northeast Conference men's basketball season =

- League: NCAA Division I
- Sport: Basketball
- Duration: November 6, 2023 – March 21, 2024
- Teams: 9
- Total attendance: 104,201 for 121 home games (average: 861 per game)
- TV partner(s): CBSSN, ESPN2, ESPNU, SNY, YES
- Streaming partner(s): ESPN+, NEC Front Row

NBA draft
- Top draft pick: No conference players selected

Regular season
- Regular-season co-champions: Central Connecticut; Merrimack
- Top seed: Central Connecticut
- Season MVP: Jordan Derkack (Merrimack)
- Top scorer: Jordan Derkack (Merrimack)

NEC tournament
- Venue: Lawler Arena; North Andover, Massachusetts
- Champions: Wagner
- Runners-up: Merrimack
- Tournament MVP: Tahron Allen (Wagner)

Northeast Conference men's basketball seasons
- ← 2022–23 2024–25 →

2023–24 Northeast Conference men's basketball standings
	Conf.				Overall
Team	W		L	PCT	W		L	PCT
Central Connecticut	13	–	3	.813	20	–	11	.645
Merrimack	13	–	3	.813	21	–	12	.636
Sacred Heart	10	–	6	.625	16	–	16	.500
Le Moyne*	9	–	7	.563	15	–	17	.469
Fairleigh Dickinson	9	–	7	.563	15	–	17	.469
Wagner †	7	–	9	.438	17	–	16	.515
LIU	6	–	10	.375	7	–	22	.241
Saint Francis	3	–	13	.188	8	–	22	.267
Stonehill*	2	–	14	.125	4	–	27	.129
† 2024 NEC tournament winner * ineligible for the 2024 NCAA tournament due to transition from Division II

The 2023–24 Northeast Conference men's basketball season began with practices in October 2023, followed by the start of the 2023–24 NCAA Division I men's basketball season on November 6. Conference play started in early January and ended on March 2, 2024. This was the 43rd season of Northeast Conference men's basketball. Merrimack was the defending regular-season and conference tournament champion. Due to Merrimack's ineligibility as a team transitioning from Division II, Fairleigh Dickinson represented the conference in the 2023 NCAA tournament and advanced to the second round.

Central Connecticut and Merrimack were co-champions of the 2023–24 NEC regular season, giving Merrimack the title in two straight years.

The NEC tournament was held in March with the higher-seeded team hosting each game. The top eight teams in the conference standings qualified for the tournament. Wagner defeated Merrimack in the tournament final to win the program's second NEC tournament title and advance to the NCAA Division I tournament for the second time in school history. Wagner's only previous NEC tournament title and NCAA tournament appearance came in 2003.

Wagner received the overall no. 68 seed of the 68 teams in the NCAA tournament but defeated Howard in the First Four for the program's first ever NCAA tournament victory. The Seahawks then fell to North Carolina in the first round.

This was the final season for two NEC members. Merrimack and Sacred Heart will leave the conference after the 2023–24 school year to join the Metro Atlantic Athletic Conference. At the same time, Chicago State will join the NEC after two seasons as a Division I independent, and Mercyhurst will begin its transition from Division II as a new member of the NEC.

== Offseason ==
At the conclusion of the previous season, St. Francis Brooklyn, a charter member of the NEC, discontinued its entire athletic program.

On March 21, 2023, Fairleigh Dickinson head coach Tobin Anderson was named the head coach at Iona, replacing Rick Pitino who had departed for the head coaching position at St. John's. Anderson's assistant, Jack Castleberry, was immediately promoted to Fairleigh Dickinson's head coaching position.

Le Moyne College joined the Northeast Conference from the Division II Northeast-10 Conference effective July 1, 2023. Le Moyne is not eligible for the NCAA tournament until the 2027–28 season, when its four-year reclassification period ends.

Effective for the 2023–24 academic year, NEC teams transitioning from Division II are eligible for the NEC tournament during the entirety of their transition periods. If a reclassifying institution wins the NEC tournament championship, the tournament runner-up will be awarded the NEC's automatic bid to the NCAA tournament. If two reclassifying teams reach the final of the NEC tournament, the conference will stage an automatic qualifier game between the two non-advancing semifinalists. Previously, transitioning NEC teams were eligible for the conference tournament only during their third and fourth transition years. The rule change results in Stonehill and Le Moyne being eligible for the 2024 NEC tournament, since Stonehill is in its second transition year, and Le Moyne is in its first.

== Head coaches ==
Team	Head coach	Previous position	Year at school	Overall record	NEC record	NEC tournament championships
Central Connecticut	Patrick Sellers	Fairfield (asst.)	3	18–46	12–22	0
Fairleigh Dickinson	Jack Castleberry	Fairleigh Dickinson (asst.)	1	0–0	0–0	0
Le Moyne	Nate Champion	Florida Southern (asst.)	4 (Note: Le Moyne did not play during the 2020–21 season due to the COVID-19 pandemic. Consequently, this is Champion's fifth year as the team's head coach but only his fourth season.)	46–39	0–0	0
LIU	Rod Strickland	NBA G League Ignite (program director)	2	3–26	1–15	0
Merrimack	Joe Gallo	Robert Morris (asst.)	8	122–86	45–25	1
Sacred Heart	Anthony Latina	Sacred Heart (asst.)	11	125–177	81–93	0
Saint Francis	Rob Krimmel	Saint Francis (asst.)	12	147–188	97–97	0
Stonehill	Chris Kraus	Stonehill (asst.)	10 (Note: Stonehill did not play during the 2020–21 season due to the COVID-19 pandemic. Consequently, this is Kraus's 11th year as the team's head coach but only his 10th season.)	144–116	10–6	0
Wagner	Donald Copeland	Seton Hall (asst.)	2	15–13	8–8	0

Notes
All records, appearances, titles, etc. are from time with current school only.
Year at school includes 2023–24 season.
Overall and NEC/NCAA records are from time at current school and are before the beginning of the 2023–24 season.
Previous jobs are head coaching jobs unless otherwise noted.

== Preseason ==
=== Preseason coaches' poll ===
The table below shows the preseason rankings of NEC teams based on a poll of the conference's coaches as well as each team's preseason Pomeroy rating among the 362 Division I teams.

Rank	Team	Pomeroy rating
1	Sacred Heart (7)	286
2	Central Connecticut (1)	316
3	Fairleigh Dickinson (1)	310
4	Merrimack	331
5	Wagner	295
6	Stonehill	346
7	LIU	354
8	Saint Francis	358
9	Le Moyne	361

() first-place votes

=== Preseason All-NEC team ===
Player	School
Ansley Almonor (Junior, Forward)	Fairleigh Dickinson
Kellen Amos (Senior, Forward)	Central Connecticut
Nico Galette (Senior, Guard)	Sacred Heart
Joey Reilly (Graduate, Guard)	Sacred Heart
Max Zegarowski (Graduate, Forward)	Stonehill

== Regular season ==
=== Early-season multi-team events ===
Team	Event	Host	Record
Central Connecticut	None	–	–
Fairleigh Dickinson	Urban-Bennett Memorial Classic	Robert Morris	0–2
Le Moyne	Golden State Hoops Jam	Pacific	1–1
LIU	Northern Kentucky Thanksgiving Tournament	Northern Kentucky	1–1
Merrimack	Samford Multi-Team Event	Samford	1–2
Sacred Heart	UMBC Multi-Team Event	UMBC	1–1
Saint Francis	None	–	–
Stonehill	Wildcat Challenge	Kentucky	0–3
Wagner	None	–	–

=== Pre-conference season notes ===
On November 6, 2023, the season's opening night, Fairleigh Dickinson returned to action following their historic upset and run in the 2023 NCAA tournament in the head coaching debut of Jack Castleberry. Jo'el Emanuel recorded his first career double-double, which included career highs of 24 points and 11 rebounds, to lead the Knights to a 92–86 road win at Buffalo.

The following night, Le Moyne made its debut as an NEC member and a Division I program. Darrick Jones Jr. hit a three-pointer from the top of the key early in the game at Georgetown for the Dolphins' first points scored as a Division I program. Ball State transfer Kaiyem Cleary led Le Moyne with 11 points, all in the second half, and seven rebounds, but it was not enough as the Dolphins fell to the Hoyas, 94–57.

Max Zegarowski matched his career high with six three-pointers and scored 21 points and grabbed eight rebounds to lead Stonehill to a 57–44 victory over Army West Point in the Skyhawks' home opener on November 9.

Le Moyne used first-half runs of 16–2 and 20–2 to build a 47–15 lead and never looked back on their way to a 105–46 victory, their first as a Division I program, over Division III SUNY Canton in their home opener on November 13. Five Dolphins had double-figure scoring games led by Kaiyem Cleary with 21 points, Nate McClure with 16, Darrick Jones Jr. with 13 and freshman AJ Dancler with 12. Redshirt freshman Nate Fouts made his collegiate debut and scored 11 points with three assists and two blocked shots. Cleary shot 8 for 10 from the field, while adding seven rebounds and two steals in just 16 minutes. McClure hit six of his seven shots, including 4-for-5 shooting from three-point range. Dancler grabbed five rebounds and dished out five assists. The Dolphins shot 32-for-37 on two-point field goals for the game, including 15-for-16 in the first half.

In a November 15 game dubbed the Battle of the Bracket Busters, Fairleigh Dickinson hosted Saint Peter's, a team which made an unexpected run of its own to the Elite Eight at the 2022 NCAA tournament, upsetting both the No. 1 and No. 2 seeds in their region along the way. The matchup between the North Jersey neighbors was the first to be broadcast on YES as part of the Knights' new local television contract. Fairleigh Dickinson shot 7-for-13 on three-pointers in the first half and built a 43–34 lead at the break. The Peacocks used a 9–0 run to cut the Knights' lead from 13 down to four with 2:39 to play. Nursing a two-point lead in the final minute, Fairleigh Dickinson failed to score, and a three-pointer by Michael Houge gave Saint Peter's a 70–69 lead with nine seconds on the clock. Knights head coach Jack Castleberry elected not to call time-out. DeVante Jamison, who finished with 11 points, five assists and three steals, took the ensuing inbounds pass, dribbled up the floor and was fouled in the act of shooting with 2.3 seconds remaining. Jamison hit both free throws, and the Knights held on for a 71–70 victory. Ansley Almonor led Fairleigh Dickinson with a game-high 21 points, and Jo'el Emanuel scored 16 on 6-for-7 shooting from the field.

Nico Galette came off the bench to score 21 points, including the 1,000th of his career, on 9-for-11 shooting and pull down six rebounds to lead Sacred Heart to an 89–75 home win over Binghamton on November 21. Tanner Thomas added 16 points and six rebounds for the Pioneers.

Later that evening, Le Moyne recorded its first victory over a Division I opponent as a Division I program, an 80–70 win at Cal State Northridge in the Dolphins' opening game of the Golden State Hoops Jam, a multi-team event sponsored by Pacific. Luke Sutherland led the Dolphins with 24 points and five rebounds. Le Moyne started five graduate students for the first time in the program's history, and they responded by sprinting to an 11–4 lead to start the game, getting early scoring from Sutherland, Nate McClure (12 points, four rebounds and three steals for the game) and Isaiah Salter. After Le Moyne fell behind, 15–12, Mike DePersia (eight points, nine assists, four rebounds and three steals for the game) sparked a 19–2 run with a pull-up jump shot. The Matadors got no closer than three points behind the rest of the way. The Dolphins closed out the game with strong free-throw shooting, finishing the game 31-for-34 from the free-throw line.

Saint Francis used an 8–0 run to close out its 62–61 win at Lehigh and give head coach Rob Krimmel his 150th career victory on November 29. Trailing, 61–54, with under two minutes remaining, the Red Flash defense forced two turnovers and three missed shots to shut out the Mountain Hawks the rest of the way. Saint Francis was also helped by two missed free throws by Lehigh. Cam Gregory was fouled in the act of shooting a three-pointer with 10.2 seconds remaining and hit all three free throws to erase Lehigh's two-point lead and provide the winning margin. The Red Flash were led by freshmen Aaron "Ace" Talbert (12 points in 32 minutes off the bench) and Aidan Harris, who secured 15 boards, including the rebound on Lehigh's attempted game-winner in the closing seconds.

That same evening, Central Connecticut registered the largest margin of victory by an NEC team in a road game in nearly two years, when they won, 79–51, at Army West Point. Kellen Amos led the Blue Devils with 17 points and added three blocked shots. Jordan Jones scored 15 points, shooting 7-for-13 from the floor, and added five rebounds and three steals for Central Connecticut.

On December 2, Fairleigh Dickinson, Saint Francis and Wagner all overcame double-digit deficits to record road victories. Joe Munden Jr. scored 19 points and had three steals to help Fairleigh Dickinson overcome NJIT's 12-point lead and earn a 71–68 victory. DeVante Jamison added 17 points on 7-for-13 shooting, and Jo'el Emanuel had 14 points and eight rebounds for the Knights.

Bobby Rosenberger III had 19 points and three steals to help Saint Francis erase a 20-point lead, which was still at 14 points with less than eight minutes to play, and defeat American, 75–73. Cam Gregory scored 14 points and added three steals for the Red Flash.

Wagner got 13 points each from Melvin Council Jr. and Javier Ezquerra and overcame a 16-point Stony Brook lead to earn a 60–59 victory. The Seahawks used a 10–0 run in the early stages of the second half to cut the Seawolves' lead to 43–42 and took their first lead of the game at 48–47, when Council scored with 8:55 to play. Stony Brook regained the lead at 59–58, but two free throws by Tyje Kelton with 1:19 remaining put Wagner back on top. Neither team scored the rest of the way.

Wagner made two defensive stands in the closing minute to secure a 62–59 victory at Coppin State on November 6. Leading by one point, the Seahawks forced the Eagles into an off-balance shot with 25 seconds remaining. A layup by Zaire Williams, who finished with a game-high 21 points, extended the Wagner lead to three with 12 seconds to play. Melvin Council Jr. (13 points) and Keyontae Lewis (11 points) then crowded Camaren Sparrow at the three-point line on Coppin State's final possession and forced an air ball.

DeVante Jamison's driving layup with 1:16 to go gave Fairleigh Dickinson a 72–69 lead at Manhattan on November 8. The Knights hit their free throws down the stretch to secure a 76–71 victory in a game the Jaspers led by 12 points with 8:39 to play. Ansley Almonor led the Knights with 24 points and added eight rebounds. Jamison finished with 12 points, eight assists and three steals.

Luke Sutherland scored an NEC season-high 35 points in the inaugural Battle of the Interstate at Binghamton, but it was not enough as Le Moyne fell, 91–79. Sutherland was 12-for-17 from the field, including 5-for-7 from beyond the arc, and hit all six of his free throws. His 35 points were the most by a Le Moyne player since the Dolphins' current head coach, Nate Champion, scored 35 in a November 2013 game that went to overtime. Sutherland also had three rebounds, three assists and two blocked shots. The Bearcats were presented a newly minted trophy to commemorate their victory in front of Binghamton's largest home crowd in nearly two years.

Le Moyne hosted a Division I opponent for the first time since an 88–75 loss to Siena in 1991, and for the first time since becoming a Division I program on December 16, when they faced Dartmouth. With the Big Green leading, 8–7, the Dolphins went on a 15–6 run to open an eight-point lead with nine minutes to go in the first half. Kaiyem Cleary had the first eight of the 15 points, and Luke Sutherland scored the final seven during the run. A Trent Mosquera three-pointer stretched Le Moyne's lead to nine points at 32–23 with 4:15 left in the half. However, Dartmouth closed the half with a 13–4 run that tied the score at 36 at the break. The game remained tight in the opening stages of the second half, but the Dolphins closed the game with a 32–9 run over the final 13:12, which included a stretch of 15 straight points scored by Le Moyne. Sutherland had 11 of the 15 points, including three three-pointers and a layup. The Dolphins held the Big Green scoreless over the final 2:51 to secure an 80–54 victory, their first win over an Ivy League opponent. Sutherland finished the game with 24 points, while shooting 10-for-15 from the field and 4-for-8 from behind the arc, and added four rebounds, three assists, two steals and a block. Cleary contributed 19 points, shooting 4-for-6 from the floor and 3-for-4 from three-point range, while collecting six rebounds. Nate McClure had 12 rebounds for the Dolphins.

Later that day, Central Connecticut snapped Division I's second longest home winning streak at 20 games, when they won, 57–54, at UMass Lowell. Following a timeout with 6.2 seconds remaining in a tie game, Joe Ostrowsky found Jordan Jones, who had been freed up by a Tre Breland III screen, in the corner, and Jones buried a three-pointer with three seconds to go to give the Blue Devils a 57–54 lead. The River Hawks' three-point attempt at the buzzer was unsuccessful. Jones shot 7-for-14 to earn a game-high 15 points and added five rebounds. Breland scored 11 points off the bench and shot 3-for-4 from three-point range.

=== Conference season notes ===
LIU, picked 7th in the pre-season coaches' poll and entering league play on a seven-game losing streak, shocked the NEC by winning their first two games of the conference season. On January 4, the Sharks dominated the first half against Wagner and had a 17-point lead at the break. LIU extended the bulge to 26 points with under 13 minutes to play, but the Seahawks suddenly responded with a 33–6 run over the next 10 minutes and took a 67–66 lead on Javier Ezquerra's jump shot with 2:16 remaining. Tai Strickland, who finished with 23 points and three steals, hit a three-pointer with 1:13 showing on the clock to put the Sharks back in front. Neither team was able to score the rest of the way, and LIU held on for a 69–67 home victory. Eric Acker had 14 points, seven rebounds and seven assists for the Sharks. Tahron Allen had 16 points for Wagner, while Melvin Council Jr. added 15 points, eight rebounds and five assists and Ezquerra had 13 points, nine assists and two steals.

Two days later, behind Eric Acker's 23 points and Tai Strickland's three key layups in heavy traffic in the closing three and one-half minutes, LIU earned a 73–68 win at Stonehill. Strickland finished with 20 points, five rebounds and three steals. Max Zegarowski had 18 points and two steals for the Skyhawks.

Merrimack opened the conference slate with a pair of home victories over teams that are expected to contend. Jordan Derkack's 21 points, five rebounds, six assists and three steals led the Warriors to a 60–56 win over Fairleigh Dickinson on January 4. Merrimack's defense limited the Knights to 32.8% shooting and only three points in the closing 4:52. Ansley Almonor led the Knights with 17 points and nine rebounds, while Sean Moore added 14 points, 10 rebounds and two steals.

Merrimack's defense was just as tight two days later, limiting Sacred Heart to 2-for-18 shooting from three-point range, while hitting 13 triples of their own on 52% shooting from beyond the arc and ran away with an 82–58 victory. Jordan Derkack had 27 points and seven rebounds, and Devon Savage added 18 points on six 3-pointers and four steals. Nico Galette had 22 points, eight rebounds and two steals for the Pioneers.

Central Connecticut opened their conference season on the road at Stonehill on January 4, with a 74–59 win. The Blue Devils used hot 53.6% shooting in the second half to outscore the Skyhawks, 44–30, and break open what was a close game at the break. Allan Jeanne-Rose led Central Connecticut with 22 points and added eight rebounds, while Kellen Amos contributed 20 points on 8-for-14 shooting and added three steals. Chas Stinson had 17 points, eight rebounds and two steals for Stonehill.

Le Moyne played its inaugural NEC game on January 6, at Fairleigh Dickinson. Down by 10 points with less than 12 minutes to play, the Dolphins went on an 18–0 run, sparked by freshman AJ Dancler, who scored eight of his 10 bench points during the run. Kaiyem Cleary had 23 points and eight rebounds for Le Moyne. Sean Moore led the Knights with 20 points and 12 rebounds.

Central Connecticut emerged from its January 15 showdown with Merrimack as the only NEC team unbeaten in league play by earning a 75–70 home victory over the Warriors. The Blue Devils closed the first half strong and held an eight-point lead at the break. Central Connecticut extended the lead to 18 points with just over 10 minutes to play, when Merrimack embarked on a 15–3 run that cut the lead to six. Two key baskets by Kellen Amos, who finished with 12 points, in the later stages of the second half kept the Blue Devils afloat. However, Jordan Derkack, who finished with 16 points, scored seven straight points for the Warriors. After Merrimack's full-court press forced a turnover that led to a layup by Adam "Budd" Clark, the lead was only three points with 18 seconds to go. Allan Jeanne-Rose, who had a game-high 24 points and pulled down eight rebounds for the Blue Devils, sank four free throws in the closing seconds to secure the victory for Central Connecticut. Jayden Brown contributed 15 points for the Blue Devils. Adam Clark added 15 points and eight assists for Merrimack.

The name of Fairleigh Dickinson's home arena, originally called the Rothman Center, was changed on January 18, 2024, to the Bogota Savings Bank Center.

Central Connecticut put their undefeated conference record on the line, when they entertained Le Moyne on January 19. The Dolphins made their intentions clear right from the start: They were going to shoot three-pointers, and they scored all their points in building an early 12–5 lead on four triples. The Blue Devils battled back after the slow start and took their first lead, 34–33, 13 seconds before halftime. Kaiyem Cleary's free throws with half a second to play gave Le Moyne a 35–34 lead at the break. The Dolphins went on a 13–4 run, sparked by Nate McClures's six points during the spurt, to build a 53–43 lead with 14:04 to play. Facing a 10-point deficit, Jordan Jones scored six points within three and a half minutes to lead a 10–0 Central Connecticut run to tie the game at 58 with less than eight minutes remaining. With the Blue Devils holding a 69–67 lead, Darrick Jones Jr. and Mike DePersia hit back-to-back three-pointers to put Le Moyne ahead 73–69 with 1:52 on the clock. Jordan Jones hit a three-pointer to tie the game at 73 with 54 seconds remaining. After an empty possession for Le Moyne, Central Connecticut called timeout with 23 seconds left. Jordan Jones's layup attempt was off the mark and rebounded by Le Moyne's Nate Fouts, who threw an outlet pass to DePersia. DePersia's bounce pass to a cutting McClure led to a go-ahead layup with 1.2 seconds to go. The Blue Devils' inbounds pass was intercepted by Cleary, giving the Dolphins a 75–73 victory. McClure finished the game with 13 points, shooting 5 for 9. Jordan Jones led the Blue Devils with 22 points and added seven rebounds and four assists. The Dolphins' defense held Allan Jeanne-Rose, who entered the game as the leading scorer in NEC play, to just seven points. Cleary was Le Moyne's leading scorer with 19 points, and he added eight rebounds, three assists, four blocks and three steals.

Central Connecticut's loss opened the door for either Merrimack to take sole possession of first place or Wagner to move into a first-place tie. The Seahawks used a 15–4 run over the first five minutes of the second half to take the lead for good on their way to a 71–64 victory, ending the Warriors' 13-game home winning streak. Wagner was led by Melvin Council Jr., who had 15 points and 13 rebounds, freshman Seck Zongo, who had a career-high 15 points on 5-for-7 shooting while adding seven rebounds, and Javier Ezquerra, who had eight points, seven assists and no turnovers. Jacob O’Connell had 26 points and four blocks for Merrimack.

Sacred Heart defended their home court, earning a 66–61 victory over Wagner on January 21, to retain a share of first place. Joey Reilly scored 21 points and three steals for the Pioneers. Melvin Council Jr. led the Seahawks with 14 points and added six assists and two steals.

Central Connecticut bounced back from their loss to Le Moyne with a 72–63 road win at LIU to remain in a first-place tie. Allan Jeanne-Rose got back on track, scoring 19 points on 7-for-12 shooting from the floor for the Blue Devils. Tana Kopa had 24 points, three steals and three blocked shots for the Sharks.

In a January 25 game nationally televised on ESPNU, first-place Central Connecticut got 19 points and seven assists from Jordan Jones and a double-double from Kellen Amos, who had 16 points on 7-for-12 shooting and 10 rebounds, to earn a 76–60 road victory against Fairleigh Dickinson. The Blue Devils improved to 4–0 in NEC road games this season. Sean Moore had 16 points and eight rebounds, and Ansley Almonor added 16 points and four assists for the Knights.

Later that evening, Sacred Heart fell out of a tie for first place, losing, 75–71, at Saint Francis. The Red Flash started five freshmen for the first time in program history and became the first Division I team to do so this season. Two of those freshmen, Eli Wilborn and Aaron "Ace" Talbert, made key layups in the final three minutes to aid the Saint Francis cause. The Red Flash were led by sophomore Miles Webb, who came off the bench to score 19 points and add seven rebounds and three blocked shots. Nico Galette had a double-double in the losing cause for the Pioneers with 15 points, 13 rebounds and two steals. Alex Sobel was Sacred Heart's high scorer with 17 points, and he added six rebounds, four steals and three blocked shots.

Central Connecticut overcame a nine-point deficit with four minutes to play to earn a 69–68 overtime victory against Wagner on January 27, to remain in the top spot in the NEC standings. Two Blue Devils free throws by Jordan Jones, who had 16 points and five assists, with 12 seconds to play tied the game and sent it to the extra session. Kellen Amos hit a three-pointer to put the Blue Devils ahead, 69–68, with 51 seconds left in overtime, and the Seahawks were unable to score the rest of the way. Amos finished the game with 17 points and five rebounds. Javier Ezquerra had a game-high 22 points for Wagner, which also got a double-double from Keyontae Lewis, who had 13 points and 11 rebounds.

Kaiyem Cleary scored 43 points on January 27, to break Le Moyne's single-game individual scoring record, first set on January 7, 1955, and the Dolphins cruised to an 87–74 victory over LIU. Cleary's 43 points were the most scored by a player in regulation and the third most scored by a player in a single game in Division I this season. Cleary was 14 for 25 from the floor, including 6 for 10 from beyond the arc, and shot 9 for 9 from the free-throw line. He also led Le Moyne in rebounds with seven and had a pair of blocked shots. Despite shooting 0 for 6 from three-point range, Luke Sutherland scored 16 points and added five rebounds for the Dolphins. Cleary's attention-grabbing point total outshined the performance of Tai Strickland, who had a big follow-up game after his buzzer beater two nights earlier gave the Sharks a 63–60 win over Stonehill. Strickland finished the game with 34 points, seven rebounds and three assists in a losing cause.

After Central Connecticut delighted their home crowd by building a 14-point lead in the first half, the Blue Devils survived a furious comeback by Saint Francis on February 1, to extend their lead in the NEC standings to a full game. The Red Flash took a 60–59 lead on a pair of Wisler Sanon II free throws with 3:10 to play. Allan Jeanne-Rose, who scored Central Connecticut's final six points of the game, put the next three points on the board to give the Blue Devils a 62–60 lead with 2:58 on the clock. A Bobby Rosenberger layup 21 seconds later tied the game at 62. Jeanne-Rose connected on the second of two free throws to give Central Connecticut the lead with 2:22 remaining. Each team followed with three empty possessions, until Miles Webb grabbed a rebound of a missed Blue Devils shot with seven seconds to go, but the Red Flash turned the ball over, and Central Connecticut held on for a 63–62 victory. Kellen Amos led the Blue Devils with 13 points and added seven rebounds. Jeanne-Rose had 12 points and five rebounds. Carlos Lopez Jr. had a game-high 22 points for the Red Flash. Sanon had 13 points and seven rebounds.

In a February 3 matchup of the NEC's top two teams, Merrimack got 22 points and six assists from Jordan Derkack and moved into a first-place tie with Central Connecticut, beating the Blue Devils, 71–68 in North Andover. The win gave the Warriors a split of the season series with the Blue Devils, with each team winning at home. Merrimack built a 14-point lead and were up by 10 points with less than four minutes to play, but six straight points by Allan Jeanne-Rose cut the lead to 70–66 with 39 seconds remaining. A Kellen Amos steal led to Jordan Jones making a trip to the free-throw line, where he sank both shots to trim the lead to 70–68 with 26.9 seconds on the clock. Tre Breland then came up with another steal for the Blue Devils. After a timeout, Jeanne-Rose drove the lane, but his layup was blocked by Jacob O’Connell. Adam "Budd" Clark hit one of two free throws to extend the Warriors' lead to 71–68 with eight seconds to play. Jones put up a three-point attempt at the buzzer, but it was short, and Merrimack held on. Jeanne-Rose finished with a game-high 23 points and added six rebounds and two blocked shots. Tre Breland III had 14 points, nine rebounds and two steals for Central Connecticut. Jones scored 11 points and had seven assists and four steals. Devon Savage had 15 points for Merrimack.

Central Connecticut got a gorilla off their back on February 8, earning a home win over Sacred Heart, 77–70, and ending their 15-game losing streak against their in-state rivals. Jordan Jones led the Blue Devils with 33 points and four steals, shooting 11 for 16 from the floor and 5 for 8 from beyond the arc. His triple with 3:39 to play extended Central Connecticut's lead to seven points, and his pair of free throws in the closing seconds put the game away. Joey Reilly had 17 points, and Nico Galette had 16 points, seven rebounds and six steals for the Pioneers.

Merrimack found themselves in danger of falling out of a first-place tie with Central Connecticut, when they trailed, 66–55, with less than seven minutes remaining at LIU on February 8, in a game marred by a combined 57 fouls called. From there, the Warriors embarked on a 17–2 run, scoring on nine straight possessions, to take a lead. A late run by the Sharks forced overtime. Freshman Adam "Budd" Clark had seven points in the extra session to give Merrimack the edge and lead them to an 82–79 victory. Clark finished with 27 points. Jordan Derkack was the Warriors' high scorer with 34 points and added five rebounds. The Sharks got 18 points, 11 assists and three steals from Eric Acker, and Tai Strickland had 13 points, seven rebounds, six assists and six steals. Strickland became only the second Division I player this season to reach those totals in those four statistical categories.

Le Moyne had four players in double figures in their February 8 game at Stonehill, an 88–57 win for the Dolphins. After becoming the first team since 1998, to hit 18 three-pointers in a game on January 21, Le Moyne repeated the feat against the Skyhawks. The Dolphins were 18 for 33 from beyond the arc. Le Moyne became the first NEC team with two wins in league games by 30 or more points this season and the first to earn a 30-point victory on the road since 2018. Kaiyem Cleary led the Dolphins with 16 points and added five rebounds and three assists. Louie Semona had nine points, six rebounds and four assists for the Skyhawks.

The February 8 wins by Central Connecticut and Merrimack combined with the loss by Stonehill clinched berths in the NEC tournament for the Blue Devils and Warriors.

Kellen Amos had 16 points and six rebounds to lead Central Connecticut to a 71–62 home win over Fairleigh Dickinson on February 10. The Blue Devils' defense held the Knights to only four field goals in the first half and 33.3% shooting for the game. Allan Jeanne-Rose contributed 15 points for Central Connecticut. Ansley Almonor had 18 points and four assists, and Sean Moore scored 10 points and added eight rebounds and two blocked shots for Fairleigh Dickinson.

Merrimack went on an 8–0 run late in the first half to break open a close game on their way to a 66–50 home victory over Le Moyne on February 10. Devon Savage, who finished with 12 points, seven rebounds and three steals, scored four of the eight points during the run, which was keyed by the Warriors' pressing defense. Bryan Etumnu and Adam Clark each scored 15 points for Merrimack. Etumnu added seven rebounds and four blocks, and Clark had five assists and six steals. Jordan Derkack, the NEC's leading scorer, had 13 points, four rebounds, three assists and two steals for the Warriors. Freshman AJ Dancler came off the bench to score a career-high 14 points in 25 minutes for the Dolphins, who posted their lowest scoring output of the season to date. The win was Merrimack's sixth straight, keeping them tied for first place with Central Connecticut at 9–2 in NEC play.

Saint Francis took a two-game lead in their battle for the eighth seed in the NEC tournament with a 72–63 home victory over Stonehill on February 10. The Red Flash got career highs from a pair of freshmen guards: Bobby Rosenberger III had 22 points, and Aaron "Ace" Talbert scored 21. Rosenberger added nine rebounds, and Talbert had five assists. Rosenberger and Talbert were the first pair of freshmen on the same team to each score at least 20 points in an NEC game since 2019. Rob Krimmel became the 12th head coach in NEC history to record 100 regular-season conference victories. Louie Semona led the Skyhawks with 13 points.

February 15 was clinching day in the NEC. Fairleigh Dickinson, Le Moyne, Wagner and LIU all secured berths in the NEC tournament, and Merrimack guaranteed themselves home-court advantage for the conference quarterfinals.

In the only one of the four February 15 conference games that did not go to overtime, first-place Merrimack overcame a five-point deficit with 1:08 to play, ending the game on an 8–0 run to claim a 66–63 road victory over Stonehill. Adam "Budd" Clark sealed the deal, scoring the final six points of the contest for the Warriors, including the go-ahead jump shot with nine seconds left on the clock. His two free throws just before time expired put the game out of reach. Clark finished with 29 points and six assists. Max Zegarowski led the Skyhawks with 19 points and added six rebounds. Todd Brogna had six points and career highs of 10 assists, eight rebounds and three steals for Stonehill, becoming the only Division I freshman this season to post those totals in those four statistical categories.

Kaiyem Cleary scored with 45 seconds left in regulation to tie up Le Moyne's home game with Central Connecticut. After the Blue Devils took a one-point lead in overtime, the Dolphins scored the final six points of the extra session, including a baseline jump shot by Cleary with 1:24 to play that gave Le Moyne the lead for good. Cleary finished with 21 points, 11 rebounds, two assists and two blocked shots. Freshman AJ Dancler had 13 points, four of them in overtime, three assists, two rebounds and two steals in 26 minutes off the bench for the Dolphins. Kellen Amos had 26 points, and Tre Breland III scored 15 points and had 12 rebounds and two steals for Central Connecticut.

After neither team was able to score in the final 1:43 of regulation, Wagner was protecting a two-point lead in the final minute of overtime at Saint Francis, when Eli Wilborn hit a pair of free throws to tie the game with eight seconds left. Melvin Council Jr. hit a running bank shot from the lane to give the Seahawks the lead with two seconds on the clock. Wilborn missed a shot at the buzzer, and Wagner held on for a 65–63 win. Council finished the game with 20 points, eight rebounds and three steals. Wilborn and Bobby Rosenberger III each had 16 points for the Red Flash. Wilborn also pulled down eight rebounds and had two steals.

The opening tip of Fairleigh Dickinson's February 15 game at LIU was delayed about 15 minutes as several of the Knights were stuck in an elevator that takes the players from the visiting locker room to the court at the Steinberg Wellness Center and had to be rescued by the New York City Fire Department. Once the contest was underway, it featured 25 lead changes and 21 ties. Fairleigh Dickinson had a lead in the final minute until Tana Kopa's basket with 33 seconds to play tied the game at 79 and sent it to overtime. Heru Bligen, who had 14 points and eight rebounds for the Knights, scored Fairleigh Dickinson's only field goal in overtime during the first minute of the extra session, while LIU managed only three points in the five minutes. Kopa, who finished with 18 points, barely missed a half-court shot at the overtime buzzer that would have won the game for the Sharks, as the Knights survived with an 84–82 victory. Fairleigh Dickinson's Ansley Almonor had a game-high 19 points and added nine rebounds, crossing the 1,000-career-points plateau during the game. Nikola Djapa had a double-double for the Sharks with 16 points and 10 rebounds.

Merrimack extended their lead over idle Central Connecticut in the battle for the NEC's regular-season crown with an 83–68 home victory over LIU on February 17. Bryan Etumnu and Jordan Derkack each scored 18 points for the Warriors. Etumnu added five rebounds, three steals, and four blocks. Andre Washington led the Sharks with 16 points, and Terell Strickland scored 10 points and had four assists and three steals for LIU. Merrimack improved to 11–2 in league play, a game-and-a-half ahead of the Blue Devils.

In a key matchup of teams battling to secure home-court advantage for their NEC quarterfinal games, Sacred Heart earned a 63–53 road win at Wagner on February 17. Kyle McGee led the Pioneers with 17 points and added six rebounds and three steals. Melvin Council Jr., scored 17 points for the Seahawks.

Kyle McGee was 8 for 11 from the floor and 4 for 4 from behind the arc to lead Sacred Heart to a 99–91 home victory over Fairleigh Dickinson on February 22, in a key matchup in the race for home-court advantage in the NEC quarterfinals. McGee finished with 21 points for the Pioneers who also got 18 points from Joey Reilly on 7-for-10 shooting. Joe Munden Jr. led the Knights with 23 points and six rebounds. Sean Moore also had 19 points, 14 rebounds, four assists and two steals for Fairleigh Dickinson. The win put Sacred Heart alone in third place in the league standings at 8–5.

Merrimack strengthened their hold on first place with their ninth straight win, a 71–60 home victory over Saint Francis on February 22. Samba Diallo scored 14 points and had six rebounds and three steals for the Warriors. Adam "Budd" Clark scored 13 points and added five assists and three steals. Eli Wilborn led the Red Flash with 16 points. The win guaranteed the Warriors home-court advantage through the NEC semifinals.

Central Connecticut overcame a 20-point deficit to earn a 73–72 win at Wagner on February 22. The Blue Devils secured home-court advantage for the NEC quarterfinals with the victory. After trailing for most of the game, Central Connecticut used a 9–0 run to take a 55–53 lead with 7:11 remaining. The Blue Devils extended their lead to 71–62 with a 13–4 run and appeared in control of the game with 1:29 to play. However, the Seahawks closed the game on a 10–2 run, holding Central Connecticut to just a pair of free throws, and were within a point with 22 seconds remaining. Wagner then forced a turnover, but the potential game-winner was off the mark. Jayden Brown led the Blue Devils with 15 points and seven rebounds. Julian Brown had a game-high 17 points for the Seahawks.

Fairleigh Dickinson made its case for playing its NEC quarterfinal game at home with a 68–58 road win at Le Moyne on February 24. The teams were tied at 49 with 5:16 to play, when the Knights went on an 11–2 run over three minutes. Ansley Almonor, who finished with a career-high 30 points on 9-for-14 shooting, including 6 for 8 from three-point range, scored eight of Fairleigh Dickinson's 11 points during the run. Joe Munden Jr. had 19 points and six rebounds for the Knights, who improved their league record to 8–6. Kaiyem Cleary had a double-double with 18 points and a career-high 14 rebounds for the Dolphins.

Central Connecticut fell behind by 13 points early in the second half but battled back for another road win, 68–67, at Sacred Heart on February 24. Just as was the case two days earlier, the Blue Devils went on second-half runs that appeared to put them in control of the game, but they saw their opponents battle back. After Central Connecticut built a 59–50 lead, the Pioneers went on an 8–0 run that tightened up the game, and they ultimately tied the score at 62 with 49 seconds remaining. A pair of free throws by Allan Jeanne-Rose gave the Blue Devils a lead, and Central Connecticut was 6 for 6 at the free-throw line in the final minute. After a pair of charity tosses by Davonte Sweatman gave the Blue Devils a four-point lead with two seconds remaining, Nico Galette's buzzer-beating three-pointer completed the scoring. Tre Breland III led Central Connecticut with 21 points and added six rebounds and three steals. Jeanne-Rose scored 16 points, shooting 6 for 9 from the floor. Alex Sobel scored 17 points and had nine rebounds, two steals and five blocks for the Pioneers. The Blue Devils guaranteed themselves home-court advantage through the NEC semifinals with the win.

Stonehill kept their NEC postseason hopes alive with a 72–62 home victory over Saint Francis on February 24. The Red Flash had a chance to punch their ticket to the NEC tournament with a win. Instead, the Skyhawks gave themselves an opportunity to qualify for the tournament by winning their final two regular-season games at home against Sacred Heart and at Central Connecticut. Tony Felder led Stonehill with a career-high 30 points on 10-for-19 shooting and pulled down seven rebounds. Gestin Liberis had 12 points and seven rebounds for Saint Francis.

Jordan Derkack had 23 points and six assists, as Merrimack clinched at least a share their second straight NEC regular-season crown with a 74–55 victory at Fairleigh Dickinson on February 29. The Warriors' defense held the Knights to 31% shooting from the floor, including 3 for 23 from beyond the arc, and Merrimack scored 15 points off 14 Fairleigh Dickinson turnovers. Adam "Budd" Clark scored 21 points and had five rebounds, three assists and four steals for the Warriors. Ansley Almonor led the Knights with 14 points.

Central Connecticut kept pace with Merrimack and remaining in the hunt for the no. 1 seed in the NEC tournament with a 78–64 home victory over LIU. Jordan Jones, Kellen Amos and Allan Jeanne-Rose scored 17 points each to lead the Blue Devils' attack. Jones became the 40th player in program history to score 1,000 career points. Eric Acker led the Sharks with 13 points.

Sacred Heart clinched the no. 3 seed in the NEC tournament with a 79–51 win at Stonehill on February 29. Aidan Carpenter led the Pioneers with 17 points. Max Zegarowski had 14 points and seven rebounds for the Skyhawks.

Le Moyne took control of the race for the no. 4 seed and home-court advantage in the NEC quarterfinals with a 70–56 home win over Wagner on February 29. Darrick Jones Jr. led the Dolphins with 21 points on 8-for-14 shooting, including 5 for 9 from three-point range. Melvin Council Jr. scored 21 points for the Seahawks.

Entering the final day of the regular season, Merrimack had the opportunity to clinch the no. 1 seed in the NEC tournament with a win or a loss by Central Connecticut. The Blue Devils would claim with no. 1 seed with a win and a loss by the Warriors. Le Moyne would earn the no. 4 seed with a win. If the Dolphins lost, the no. 4 seed would go to the winner of the game between Fairleigh Dickinson and Wagner. Saint Francis could claim the final berth in the NEC tournament with a win or a loss by Stonehill. The Skyhawks would earn the no. 8 seed with a win and a Red Flash loss.

Sacred Heart ended Merrimack's 10-game winning streak, beating the Warriors at home, 89–85, on March 2. Raheem Solomon scored 26 points and added six rebounds for the Pioneers, who also got 22 points, seven rebounds and five assists from Nico Galette. Jordan Derkack had 27 points, nine rebounds, five assists and two steals for the Warriors.

Central Connecticut claimed a share of the NEC regular-season championship and the no. 1 seed in the NEC tournament with a 79–67 win over Stonehill on March 2. Jayden Brown and Allan Jeanne-Rose each scored 19 points for the Blue Devils. Brown added eight rebounds, and Jeanne-Rose pulled down seven boards. Max Zegarowski led the Skyhawks, who were eliminated from the race for the final berth in the NEC tournament with the loss, with 19 points.

Le Moyne claimed the no. 4 seed in the NEC tournament and home-court advantage in the NEC quarterfinals with a 74–58 win at Saint Francis on March 2. Luke Sutherland led the Dolphins with 22 points, seven rebounds and eight assists. Carlos Lopez Jr. scored 17 points for the Red Flash.

=== Conference matrix ===
This table summarizes the head-to-head results between teams in conference regular-season play. The home team's score is shown in boldface type.

	Central Connecticut	Fairleigh Dickinson	Le Moyne	LIU	Merrimack	Sacred Heart	Saint Francis	Stonehill	Wagner
vs. Central Connecticut	–	**60**–76; 62–**71**	75–**73**; **69**–64^{OT}	**63**–72; 64–**78**	70–**75**; **71**–68	70–**77**; **67**–68	**61**–75; 62–**63**	**59**–74; 67–**79**	68–**69**^{OT} **72**–73
vs. Fairleigh Dickinson	76–**60**; **71**–62	–	74–**63**; **58**–68	75–**82**; **82**–84^{OT}	**60**–56; 74–**55**	91–**93**; **99**–91	**71**–81; 74–**93**	74–**81**^{OT} **69**–76	66–**62**; **54**–57
vs. Le Moyne	**73**–75; 64–**69**^{OT}	**63**–74; 68–**58**	–	74–**87**; **76**–64	66–**62**; **66**–50	80–**73**; **87**–81	57–**94**; **58**–74	**57**–88; 67–**75**	**80**–57; 56–**70**
vs. LIU	72–**63**; **78**–64	**82**–75; 84–**82**^{OT}	**87**–74; 64–**76**	–	82–**79**^{OT} **83**–68	**89**–55; 58–**75**	**72**–66; 67–**70**	**68**–73; 60–**63**	67–**69**; **72**–57
vs. Merrimack	**75**–70; 68–**71**	56–**60**; **55**–74	**62**–66; 50–**66**	**79**–82^{OT} 68–**83**	–	58–**82**; **89**–85	**55**–74; 60–**71**	47–**63**; **63**–66	71–**65**; **44**–60
vs. Sacred Heart	**77**–70; 68–**67**	**93**–91; 91–**99**	**73**–80; 81–**87**	55–**89**; **75**–58	**82**–58; 85–**89**	–	67–**79**; **75**–71	72–**77**; **51**–79	61–**66**; **53**–63
vs. Saint Francis	75–**61**; **63**–62	81–**71**; **93**–74	**94**–57; 74–**58**	66–**72**; **70**–67	74–**55**; **71**–60	**79**–67; 71–**75**	–	63–**72**; **72**–63	**71**–56; 65–**63**^{OT}
vs. Stonehill	74–**59**; **79**–67	**81**–74^{OT} 76–**69**	88–**57**; **75**–67	73–**68**; **63**–60	**63**–47; 66–**63**	**77**–72; 79–**51**	**72**–63; 63–**72**	–	**64**–54; 61–**71**
vs. Wagner	**69**–68^{OT} 73–**72**	**62**–66; 57–**54**	57–**80**; **70**–56	**69**–67; 57–**72**	**65**–71; 60–**44**	**66**–61; 63–**53**	56–**71**; **63**–65^{OT}	54–**64**; **71**–61	–
Record	**13–3**	**9–7**	**9–7**	**6–10**	**13–3**	**10–6**	**3–13**	**2–14**	**7–9**

== Record against other conferences ==
Regular season

NEC vs. power conferences	Record
ACC	0–3
Big East	0–9
Big Ten	0–6
Big 12	0–1
Pac-12	0–2
SEC	0–2
NEC vs. power conferences total	0–23
Other NCAA Division I conferences	Record
America East	6–11
American	0–0
ASUN	0–2
Atlantic 10	1–8
Big Sky	0–0
Big South	0–0
Big West	1–1
CAA	3–2
C-USA	0–1
Horizon League	0–3
Independents	0–1
Ivy League	2–2
MAAC	3–13
Mid-American	1–0
MEAC	1–0
MVC	0–0
MWC	0–1
OVC	0–0
Patriot League	8–4
SoCon	0–1
Southland	1–1
SWAC	0–1
Summit	0–0
Sun Belt	0–0
WAC	0–0
WCC	0–5
Other Division I total	27–57
NCAA Division I total	27–80
NCAA Division II	3–0
NCAA Division III	11–0
NAIA	1–0
USCAA Division II	1–0
Grand total	43–80
Through games of March 21, 2024

Postseason

NEC vs. power conferences	Record
ACC	0–1
Big East	0–0
Big Ten	0–0
Big 12	0–0
Pac-12	0–0
SEC	0–0
NEC vs. power conferences total	0–1
Other NCAA Division I conferences	Record
America East	0–0
American	0–0
ASUN	0–0
Atlantic 10	0–0
Big Sky	0–0
Big South	0–0
Big West	0–0
CAA	0–0
C-USA	0–0
Horizon League	0–0
Independents	0–0
Ivy League	0–0
MAAC	0–0
Mid-American	0–0
MEAC	1–0
MVC	0–0
MWC	0–0
OVC	0–0
Patriot League	0–0
SoCon	0–0
Southland	0–0
SWAC	0–0
Summit	0–0
Sun Belt	0–0
WAC	0–0
WCC	0–0
Other Division I total	1–0
NCAA Division I total	1–1

=== Games against ranked non-conference opponents ===
The table below shows games played by NEC teams against opponents ranked by the Associated Press at the time of the game.

Date	NEC team	Opponent	Site	Score	NEC Record
Nov. 10	Le Moyne	at No. 22 Villanova	Finneran Pavilion ● Villanova, PA	Villanova 83−57	0−1
Nov. 11	Stonehill	at No. 6 UConn	XL Center ● Hartford, CT	UConn 107−67	0−2
Nov. 17	Stonehill	at No. 17 Kentucky	Rupp Arena ● Lexington, KY	Kentucky 101−67	0−3
Dec. 6	LIU	at No. 15 Miami (FL)	Watsco Center ● Coral Gables, FL	Miami (FL) 97−49	0−4
Dec. 28	Fairleigh Dickinson	at No. 11 Illinois	State Farm Center ● Champaign, IL	Illinois 104−71	0−5
Mar. 21	Wagner	vs No. 5 North Carolina	Spectrum Center ● Charlotte, NC	North Carolina 90−62	0−6

== Rankings ==
The table below shows the rankings of NEC teams among the 362 Division I teams throughout the season. The preseason ranking is the Pomeroy rating. The remaining weekly rankings are the NET rankings reported by the NCAA beginning with the initial release at the start of week 5. NET rankings are not updated during the NCAA tournament. The rankings shown for week 20 are the final rankings at the conclusion of regular-season and conference-tournament play.

Legend
Increase in ranking
Decrease in ranking

	Pre	Week 5	Week 6	Week 7	Week 8	Week 9	Week 10	Week 11	Week 12	Week 13	Week 14	Week 15	Week 16	Week 17	Week 18	Week 19	Week 20	Final
Central Connecticut	316	261	278	242	237	242	231	224	229	219	232	227	236	230	233	253	249	245
Fairleigh Dickinson	310	300	287	297	319	319	319	323	317	323	326	324	324	321	322	325	324	324
Le Moyne	361	293	329	310	307	305	299	308	293	294	312	298	291	312	307	301	301	302
LIU	354	316	340	333	347	349	339	347	354	354	356	347	349	348	348	347	348	347
Merrimack	331	162	185	197	178	201	201	195	210	189	191	193	202	202	198	200	213	210
Sacred Heart	286	263	319	305	298	298	304	290	280	291	293	301	293	299	283	288	286	286
Saint Francis	358	340	331	343	341	335	338	341	348	348	345	345	346	349	350	352	352	352
Stonehill	346	349	358	354	354	345	352	353	358	358	350	358	356	354	357	356	355	355
Wagner	295	284	320	324	322	291	297	292	286	295	295	291	304	305	314	303	290	288

== Postseason ==
=== NEC tournament ===
Games were played on March 6, 9, and 12, 2024, at campus sites. The top eight teams in the conference regular-season standings qualified. Wagner became the first team to win three road games and take the NEC tournament title and, as the no. 6 seed, matched the lowest seeded team to ever capture the NEC crown with a 54–47 victory at Merrimack. Tahron Allen was named tournament MVP.

Teams were reseeded after each round with highest remaining seeds receiving home-court advantage.

Quarterfinals; Wednesday, March 6 NEC Front Row
1	Central Connecticut	71
8	Saint Francis	62
4	Le Moyne	82
5	Fairleigh Dickinson	61
(Pairings are reseeded after the first round)
2	Merrimack	72
7	LIU	66
3	Sacred Heart	57
6	Wagner	60

Semifinals; Saturday, March 9 YES/ESPN+
1	Central Connecticut	56
6	Wagner	66
2	Merrimack	61
4	Le Moyne	51

Championship; Tuesday, March 12; ESPN2
6	Wagner	54
2	Merrimack	47

=== NCAA tournament ===
As champion of the NEC tournament, Wagner automatically qualified for the NCAA tournament. Wagner was the no. 68 overall seed of the 68 teams participating.

With only seven players dressed, Wagner earned the program's first NCAA tournament victory over Howard, 71–68, on March 19. After a 23–6 run gave the Seahawks a 17-point lead with 5:32 to play in the opening half, Wagner controlled the game much of the rest of the way. The Seahawks had a 13-point lead with 4:28 remaining. However, the Bison surged back in the final minutes and got within a point of the lead with 17 seconds to go. Two free throws by sophomore Julian Brown with 14 seconds on the clock extended Wagner's lead to three points. Howard missed three potential game-tying shots from beyond the arc in the final 10 seconds, and the Seahawks held on for the win. Wagner held Howard, the 20th ranked three-point shooting team in Division I, to a 39% field-goal percentage and 29% from three-point range. Junior Melvin Council Jr. had a game-high 21 points, shooting 10 for 18, and had five rebounds and seven assists, while playing the entire 40 minutes for the Seahawks. Brown scored 15 points for Wagner.

On March 21, in front of a partisan crowd just 2 1/2 hours from their Chapel Hill campus, no. 1 seed North Carolina went on an 18–8 run midway through the first half to break open a tight game and build a 40–28 lead at the break. Following the intermission, the Tar Heels extended their lead to 20 points at 70–50 with 8:33 to play, and the Seahawks never got within single digits the rest of the way. North Carolina shot 55% from the floor, while holding Wagner to a 40% clip. The Seahawks had only seven scholarship players dressed for the game. Armando Bacot led the way for the Tar Heels with 20 points and 15 rebounds. Julian Brown and Melvin Council Jr. each scored 18 points for the Seahawks.

Seed	Region	School	First Four	First round
16	West	Wagner	W 71–68 vs. (16) Howard	L 62–90 vs. (1) North Carolina

== Awards and honors ==
=== All-NEC honors and awards ===
At the conclusion of the regular season, the conference selects outstanding performers based on a poll of league coaches. Below are the results.

Honor	Recipient	School
Player of the Year	Jordan Derkack (Sophomore, Guard)	Merrimack
Coach of the Year	Patrick Sellers	Central Connecticut
Defensive Player of the Year	Jordan Derkack (Sophomore, Guard)	Merrimack
Rookie of the Year	Adam "Budd" Clark (Freshman, Guard)	Merrimack
Most Improved Player of the Year	Bryan Etumnu (Sophomore, Forward)	Merrimack
All-NEC First Team	Ansley Almonor (Junior, Forward)	Fairleigh Dickinson
All-NEC First Team	Kaiyem Cleary (Graduate, Guard)	Le Moyne
All-NEC First Team	Melvin Council Jr. (Junior, Guard)	Wagner
All-NEC First Team	Jordan Derkack (Sophomore, Guard)	Merrimack
All-NEC First Team	Allan Jeanne-Rose (Graduate, Forward)	Central Connecticut
All-NEC Second Team	Adam "Budd" Clark (Freshman, Guard)	Merrimack
All-NEC Second Team	Nico Galette (Senior, Guard)	Sacred Heart
All-NEC Second Team	Jordan Jones (Senior, Guard)	Central Connecticut
All-NEC Second Team	Alex Sobel (Senior, Forward)	Sacred Heart
All-NEC Second Team	Luke Sutherland (Graduate, Forward)	Le Moyne
All-NEC Third Team	Kellen Amos (Senior, G/F)	Central Connecticut
All-NEC Third Team	Sean Moore (Senior, Forward)	Fairleigh Dickinson
All-NEC Third Team	Joey Reilly (Graduate, Guard)	Sacred Heart
All-NEC Third Team	Tai Strickland (Graduate, Guard)	LIU
All-NEC Third Team	Max Zegarowski (Graduate, Forward)	Stonehill
All-NEC Rookie Team	Eric Acker (Freshman, Guard)	LIU
All-NEC Rookie Team	Terrence Brown (Freshman, Guard)	Fairleigh Dickinson
All-NEC Rookie Team	Adam "Budd" Clark (Freshman, Guard)	Merrimack
All-NEC Rookie Team	Carlos Lopez Jr. (Freshman, Guard)	Saint Francis
All-NEC Rookie Team	Eli Wilborn (Freshman, Forward)	Saint Francis

=== Weekly conference awards ===
Throughout the regular season, the Northeast Conference named players of the week and rookies of the week.

Week	Player of the week	Rookie of the week
1 – November 13, 2023	Jo'el Emanuel, FDU	Adam "Budd" Clark, MER
2 – November 20, 2023	Tanner Thomas, SHU	Bobby Rosenberger III, SFU
3 – November 27, 2023	Nico Galette, SHU	Eric Acker, LIU
3 – November 27, 2023	Nico Galette, SHU	Adam "Budd" Clark (2), MER
4 – December 4, 2023	Jordan Derkack, MER	Eli Wilborn, SFU
5 – December 11, 2023	Ansley Almonor, FDU	Eli Wilborn (2), SFU
6 – December 18, 2023	Luke Sutherland, LEM	Aaron "Ace" Talbert, SFU
7 – December 26, 2023	Jordan Derkack (2), MER	Eli Wilborn (3), SFU
7 – December 26, 2023	Jordan Jones, CCSU	Eli Wilborn (3), SFU
8 – January 2, 2024	Chas Stinson, STO	Carlos Lopez, Jr., SFU
9 – January 8, 2024	Jordan Derkack (3), MER	Eric Acker (2), LIU
10 – January 17, 2024	Allan Jeanne-Rose, CCSU	Adam "Budd" Clark (3), MER
10 – January 17, 2024	Joey Reilly, SHU	Adam "Budd" Clark (3), MER
11 – January 23, 2024	Kaiyem Cleary, LEM	Eli Wilborn (4), SFU
12 – January 29, 2024	Kaiyem Cleary (2), LEM	Adam "Budd" Clark (4), MER
13 – February 5, 2024	Jordan Derkack (4), MER	Nikola Djapa, LIU
14 – February 12, 2024	Jordan Derkack (5), MER	Adam "Budd" Clark (5), MER
14 – February 12, 2024	Jordan Jones (2), CCSU	Adam "Budd" Clark (5), MER
15 – February 19, 2024	Ansley Almonor (2), FDU	Adam "Budd" Clark (6), MER
15 – February 19, 2024	Adam "Budd" Clark, MER	Adam "Budd" Clark (6), MER
16 – February 26, 2024	Tony Felder, STO	Eric Acker (3), LIU
17 – March 4, 2024	Jordan Derkack (6), MER	Adam "Budd" Clark (7), MER
17 – March 4, 2024	Alex Sobel, SHU	Adam "Budd" Clark (7), MER

School	Player of the week awards	Rookie of the week awards
Central Connecticut	3	0
Fairleigh Dickinson	3	0
Le Moyne	3	0
LIU	0	4
Merrimack	7	7
Sacred Heart	4	0
Saint Francis	0	7
Stonehill	2	0
Wagner	0	0

== Statistics ==
Team statistics
		Points					FG%		3-Pt%			Rebounds			Assists		Blocks		Steals	
Team	GP	For	Avg	Opp	Avg	Diff	For	Opp	For	Opp	FT%	For	Opp	Net	For	Avg	For	Avg	For	Avg
Central Connecticut	31	2,237	72.2	2,061	66.5	176	45.1%	42.2%	32.2%	33.9%	70.9%	1,111	1,051	60	444	14.3	150	4.84	232	7.48
Fairleigh Dickinson	32	2,430	75.9	2,482	77.6	-52	41.9%	45.0%	33.0%	35.5%	70.0%	1,191	1,275	-84	484	15.1	81	2.53	263	8.22
Le Moyne	32	2,318	72.4	2,245	70.2	73	43.2%	42.3%	34.6%	32.9%	76.1%	1,093	1,225	-132	503	15.7	103	3.22	256	8.00
LIU	29	1,929	66.5	2,227	76.8	-298	41.8%	45.0%	31.0%	31.1%	67.7%	1,014	1,096	-82	363	12.5	88	3.03	187	6.45
Merrimack	33	2,283	69.2	2,159	65.4	124	43.8%	41.7%	30.9%	31.4%	72.9%	1,034	1,252	-218	409	12.4	121	3.67	325	9.85
Sacred Heart	32	2,372	74.1	2,313	72.3	59	45.5%	43.5%	36.5%	35.3%	69.5%	1,079	1,187	-108	440	13.8	161	5.03	279	8.72
Saint Francis	30	1,955	65.2	2,313	72.7	-358	42.4%	45.6%	33.5%	34.7%	61.0%	1,038	1,024	14	367	12.2	107	3.57	178	5.93
Stonehill	31	1,967	63.5	2,360	76.1	-393	39.9%	44.1%	30.3%	35.5%	68.9%	1,020	1,210	-190	366	11.8	77	2.48	198	6.39
Wagner	33	2,103	63.7	2,083	63.1	20	39.6%	42.2%	32.7%	30.0%	70.4%	1,183	1,162	21	421	12.8	76	2.30	195	5.91

Individual scoring average
Rk	Player	School	PPG
1	Jordan Derkack	Merrimack	17.0
2	Ansley Almonor	Fairleigh Dickinson	16.4
3	Luke Sutherland	Le Moyne	15.5
4	Allan Jeanne-Rose	Central Connecticut	15.4
5	Kaiyem Cleary	Le Moyne	15.3

Individual field-goal percentage
Rk	Player	Team	FG%
1	Alex Sobel	Sacred Heart	58.8%
2	Allan Jeanne-Rose	Central Connecticut	54.8%
3	Eli Wilborn	Saint Francis	54.0%
4	Jayden Brown	Central Connecticut	52.6%
5	Joey Reilly	Sacred Heart	51.6%

Individual three-point field-goal percentage
Rk	Player	Team	3FG%
1	Joey Reilly	Sacred Heart	40.6%
2	Darrick Jones Jr.	Le Moyne	40.4%
3	Luke Sutherland	Le Moyne	39.6%
4	Ansley Almonor	Fairleigh Dickinson	39.4%
5	Aaron "Ace" Talbert	Saint Francis	38.1%

Individual free-throw percentage
Rk	Player	Team	FT%
1	Kaiyem Cleary	Le Moyne	83.2%
2	Ansley Almonor	Fairleigh Dickinson	80.0%
3	Tai Strickland	LIU	79.5%
4	Samba Diallo	Merrimack	78.8%
5	Joe Munden Jr.	Fairleigh Dickinson	78.0%

Individual rebounds per game
Rk	Player	Team	RPG
1	RJ Greene	LIU	8.0
2	Sean Moore	Fairleigh Dickinson	7.6
3	Eli Wilborn	Saint Francis	7.4
4	Alex Sobel	Sacred Heart	7.4
5	Nico Galette	Sacred Heart	7.3

Individual assists per game
Rk	Player	Team	APG
1	Javier Ezquerra	Wagner	4.36
2	Adam "Budd" Clark	Merrimack	3.94
3	Jordan Derkack	Merrimack	3.91
4	Eric Acker	LIU	3.77
5	Jordan Jones	Central Connecticut	3.65

Individual blocks per game
Rk	Player	Team	BPG
1	Alex Sobel	Sacred Heart	2.77
2	Bryan Etumnu	Merrimack	1.94
3	Eli Wilborn	Saint Francis	1.57
4	Jayden Brown	Central Connecticut	1.45
5	Jacob O'Connell	Merrimack	1.14

Individual steals per game
Rk	Player	Team	SPG
1	Adam "Budd" Clark	Merrimack	2.55
2	Jordan Derkack	Merrimack	2.09
3	Nico Galette	Sacred Heart	1.90
4	Jordan Jones	Central Connecticut	1.84
5	Tai Strickland	LIU	1.76

== Attendance ==
Team	**Arena**	**Capacity**	Game 1	Game 2	Game 3	Game 4	Game 5	Game 6	Game 7	Game 8	**Total**	**Average**	**% of Capacity**
**Team**	**Arena**	**Capacity**	Game 9	Game 10	Game 11	Game 12	Game 13	Game 14	Game 15	Game 16	**Total**	**Average**	**% of Capacity**
Central Connecticut	William H. Detrick Gymnasium	2,654	1,115	1,041	1,021	1,015	923	1,022	1,182	1,121	20,775	1,385	52%
Central Connecticut	William H. Detrick Gymnasium	2,654	1,301	2,023	1,090	1,429	1,631	2,412	2,449†		20,775	1,385	52%
Fairleigh Dickinson	Bogota Savings Bank Center (Note: The name of the arena, formerly known as the Rothman Center, was changed on January 18, 2024.)	1,852	570	**1,852**†	443	582	703	273	153	223	7,783	556	30%
Fairleigh Dickinson	Bogota Savings Bank Center	1,852	371	673	557	347	473	563			7,783	556	30%
Le Moyne	Ted Grant Court	2,000	405	294	480	292	466	483	794	943	7,672	590	30%
Le Moyne	Ted Grant Court	2,000	569	957†	558	570	861				7,672	590	30%
LIU	Steinberg Wellness Center; Barclays Center	2,500 (Steinberg); 17,732 (Barclays)	812	1,704† (Note: Game played at Barclays Center. Remainder of home games played at Steinberg Wellness Center.)	489	458	534	792	521	366	6,274	627	16% (Note: Based on weighted-average capacity of 4,023)
LIU	Steinberg Wellness Center; Barclays Center	2,500 (Steinberg); 17,732 (Barclays)	251	347							6,274	627	16%
Merrimack	Merrimack Athletics Complex	1,200 (Hammel Court); 2,549 (Lawler Arena)	697 (Note: Game played at Hammel Court)	2,347 (Note: Game played at Lawler Arena)	769	587	693	547	812	861	18,212	1,214	58% (Note: Based on weighted-average capacity of 2,099)
Merrimack	Merrimack Athletics Complex	1,200 (Hammel Court); 2,549 (Lawler Arena)	1,936	782	**1,347**	1,346	1,076	1,565	**2,847**†		18,212	1,214	58%
Sacred Heart	William H. Pitt Center	2,062	721	1,209	664	617	1,387	**2,400**†	312	2,000	14,100	881	43%
Sacred Heart	William H. Pitt Center	2,062	485	641	480	597	722	1,046	458	361	14,100	881	43%
Saint Francis	DeGol Arena	3,500	623	341	351	502	336	603	510	590	8,342	596	17%
Saint Francis	DeGol Arena	3,500	640	725	882†	809	703	727			8,342	596	17%
Stonehill	Merkert Gymnasium	1,560	1,157	759	725	344	230	340	1,493†	1,025	9,293	774	50%
Stonehill	Merkert Gymnasium	1,560	571	820	1,022	807					9,293	774	50%
Wagner	Spiro Sports Center	2,100	1,046	558	905	312	989	972	889	1,093	11,750	979	47%
Wagner	Spiro Sports Center	2,100	1,173	1,051	1,276	1,486†					11,750	979	47%

† Season high
Figures in bold indicate attendance was at or exceeded capacity.

== Media coverage ==
CBS Sports Network televised two conference regular-season games. ESPNU televised one conference regular-season game. SNY televised four LIU home games and Sacred Heart's home game against Fairfield. YES televised six Fairleigh Dickinson home games as well as two other conference regular-season games and both conference tournament semifinal games. A simulcast of the games broadcast by YES (other than the Fairleigh Dickinson home games) was streamed by ESPN+. In addition to the YES simulcasts, ESPN+ streamed five other conference regular-season games. The conference tournament final was televised by ESPN2. All home games of NEC teams not televised by a conference media partner were streamed by NEC Front Row, the conference's streaming platform.

The conference semifinal games were broadcast by YES live rather than on tape delay, since they did not conflict with New York Yankees spring training games. The 2024 NEC tournament final marked the 37th consecutive year that the conference's championship game was broadcast on linear television by an ESPN network.

== See also ==
- 2023–24 Northeast Conference women's basketball season
