= 2023–24 Le Moyne Dolphins men's basketball team =

College basketball team season

2023–24 Le Moyne Dolphins men's basketball
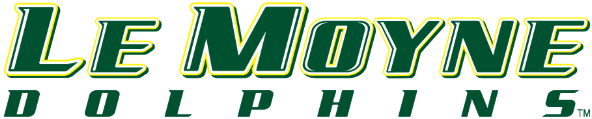
- Conference: Northeast Conference
- Record: 15–17 (9–7 NEC)
- Head coach: Nate Champion (4th season)
- Assistant coaches: Ben Swank (3rd season); Jamie Young (1st season); Ben Marello (2nd season)
- Home arena: Le Moyne Events Center (capacity: 2,000)

Uniform
Home	Away

2023–24 Northeast Conference men's basketball standings
	Conf.				Overall
Team	W		L	PCT	W		L	PCT
Central Connecticut	13	–	3	.813	20	–	11	.645
Merrimack	13	–	3	.813	21	–	12	.636
Sacred Heart	10	–	6	.625	16	–	16	.500
Le Moyne*	9	–	7	.563	15	–	17	.469
Fairleigh Dickinson	9	–	7	.563	15	–	17	.469
Wagner †	7	–	9	.438	17	–	16	.515
LIU	6	–	10	.375	7	–	22	.241
Saint Francis	3	–	13	.188	8	–	22	.267
Stonehill*	2	–	14	.125	4	–	27	.129
† 2024 NEC tournament winner * ineligible for the 2024 NCAA tournament due to transition from Division II

The 2023–24 Le Moyne Dolphins men's basketball team represented Le Moyne College during the 2023–24 NCAA Division I men's basketball season. The Dolphins, led by fourth-season (Note: Le Moyne did not play during the 2020–21 season due to the COVID-19 pandemic. Consequently, this was Champion's fifth year as the team's head coach but only his fourth season.) head coach Nate Champion, played their home games on Ted Grant Court in the Le Moyne Events Center in DeWitt, New York (Note: The campus, including the Le Moyne Events Center, has a Syracuse mailing address but lies within the adjacent town of DeWitt.) as first-year members of the Northeast Conference and NCAA Division I. This was the 75th season of Le Moyne Dolphins men's basketball and their first in Division I.

== Previous season ==
The Dolphins finished the 2022–23 season 15–15, 11–9 in Northeast-10 (NE10) play, to finish in a four-way tie for fifth place. As the no. 6 seed in the NE10 tournament, they defeated Saint Michael's in the first round, before falling to Bentley in the quarterfinals. This was Le Moyne's final season as a member of the Northeast-10 Conference, as on May 10, it was announced that they would begin their transition to Division I, joining the Northeast Conference. They officially joined the conference on July 1.

== Offseason ==
Following the 2022–23 season, Le Moyne lost Xavier Wilson, who graduated. Wilson was third on the team in points per game with 9.7 and minutes per game with 24.

Zy'Ever Wingfield and Jeremiah Washington were regular members of the Dolphins' rotation, both appearing in all 30 games and playing about 17 minutes per contest. Wingfield had seven starts, and Washington had 10. Wingfield averaged 7.6 points per game, and Washington averaged 5.3. Wingfield transferred to Virginia–Wise, and Washington transferred to Texas A&M International.

Prior to the announcement of Le Moyne moving to Division I, Jamel Melvin transferred in from Northern Colorado. Melvin played only 11 games with the Bears in 2022–23, and averaged just six minutes per appearance.

Two weeks after the move to Division I was announced, Le Moyne signed Ball State transfer Kaiyem Cleary and junior college transfer Ocypher Owens. Cleary appeared in 21 games for the Cardinals in 2022–23, averaging just five minutes per appearance. Owens was named to the all-conference second team in the NJCAA Southern Conference.

Isaiah Elmore appeared in the Dolphins' first 18 games of the 2022–23 season, starting 17 of them, but he did not play the rest of the season. In August, Elmore and Kevin Constant transferred together to Roberts Wesleyan. Elmore was Le Moyne's leader in rebounds per game with 5.0 and contributed 5.8 points per contest, averaging 17 minutes. Constant appeared in 29 games, including five starts, and averaged 5.5 points and 15 minutes per game.

Jamie Young joined the Dolphins' coaching staff on October 3, as an assistant. This is Young's return to college basketball after 23 years in supporting roles in the NBA. He was an assistant coach for the Philadelphia 76ers the previous two seasons. Prior to that, he was with the Boston Celtics for 20 years in various roles, including 10 years as an assistant coach. Young was serving as a Celtics advance scout, when the team won the 2008 NBA championship. He got his start in the NBA as an assistant video coordinator for the New Jersey Nets in the 2000–01 season. Young's first college job was as an assistant coach at Division III Greenville from 1998 to 2000.

=== Departures ===
Le Moyne departures
Name	Number	Pos.	Height	Weight	2022–23 class	Hometown	Reason for departure
Kevin Constant	11	F	6'1"	180	(redshirt) Sophomore	Lawrence, MA	Transferred to Roberts Wesleyan
Isaiah Elmore	24	F	6'9"	225	(redshirt) Sophomore	Tampa, FL	Transferred to Roberts Wesleyan
Jack Poirier	13	G	6'1"	180	(redshirt) Sophomore	Scituate, MA	Transferred to Ave Maria
Jeremiah Washington	0	G	5'10"	165	(redshirt) Junior	Chicago, IL	Transferred to Texas A&M International
Xavier Wilson	10	F	6'7"	210	Senior	Spring Valley, NY	Graduated
Zy'Ever Wingfield	2	G	6'4"	185	Sophomore	Richmond, VA	Transferred to Virginia–Wise

=== Additions ===
==== Incoming transfers ====
Le Moyne incoming transfers
Name	Number	Pos.	Height	Weight	2023–24 class	Hometown	Previous School	Years remaining	Date committed
Kaiyem Cleary	2	G	6'6"	185	Graduate	Manchester, England	Ball State	1	May 24, 2023
Mason Landdeck	4	G	6'2"	170	Junior	Cashmere, WA	Hawaii Pacific	2	March 29, 2023
Jamel Melvin	10	F	6'11"	210	Junior	Upper Marlboro, MD	Northern Colorado	2	April 15, 2023
Ocypher Owens	24	F	6'8"	215	Junior	Orlando, FL	Indian River State	2	May 24, 2023

==== Recruiting class ====
Le Moyne incoming recruits
Name	Number	Pos.	Height	Weight	Hometown	High school
AJ Dancler	11	G	6'2"	175	Indianapolis, IN	Southport
Deng Garang	13	G	6'6"	165	Syracuse, NY	Bishop Grimes

== Preseason polls ==
=== Northeast Conference poll ===
The Northeast Conference released its preseason coaches' poll on October 24, 2023. The Dolphins were picked to finish last in the conference.

Rank	Team
1	Sacred Heart (7)
2	Central Connecticut (1)
3	Fairleigh Dickinson (1)
4	Merrimack
5	Wagner
6	Stonehill
7	LIU
8	Saint Francis
9	Le Moyne

(#) first-place votes

=== KenPom rating ===
Le Moyne was ranked 361st of 362 Division I teams in the preseason Pomeroy ratings.

=== Preseason All-Conference Team ===
No Dolphins were selected as members of the NEC Preseason All-Conference Team.

== Season highlights ==
=== Pre-conference season ===
The Dolphins' top two scorers from the previous season, Luke Sutherland and Isaiah Salter, returned to the team and were joined by several Division I transfers.

Darrick Jones Jr. hit a three-pointer from the top of the key early in the Dolphins' season opener at Georgetown for Le Moyne's first points scored as a Division I program on November 7. Ball State transfer Kaiyem Cleary led the Dolphins with 11 points, all in the second half, and seven rebounds. Georgetown used a 9–2 run to take a 12–5 lead early in the game. The Hoyas extended the lead with an 8–0 run that made the score 20–7. After a brief flurry led by Jones, Trent Mosquera and Mike DePersia got the Dolphins within single digits at 28–19, the Hoyas closed the first half with a 19–4 run that gave them a 47–23 halftime lead on their way to a 94–57 victory. Jones and Luke Sutherland each contributed nine points for Le Moyne in the losing cause.

The Dolphins took on another Big East opponent, when they visited Vilanova on November 10. Led by Darrick Jones Jr. and Luke Sutherland, Le Moyne got off to a quick start and took an early 8–4 lead. The Wildcats responded with an 8–0 run to surge ahead, 12–8. However, the Dolphins responded with a run of their own led by Kaiyem Cleary, Mike DePersia and Ocypher Owens to take a 20–17 lead. Villanova used a 21–4 run to take control of the game, pushing their lead to 38–24. Le Moyne got no closer than 10 points down the rest of the way, as the Wildcats cruised to an 83–57 victory. Sutherland led the Dolphins with 15 points, and Isaiah Salter added 10. Cleary grabbed six rebounds for Le Moyne, while DePersia contributed six assists.

Le Moyne used first-half runs of 16–2 and 20–2 to build a 47–15 lead and never looked back on their way to a 105–46 victory, their first as a Division I program, over Division III SUNY Canton in their home opener on November 13. Five Dolphins had double-figure scoring games led by Kaiyem Cleary with 21 points, Nate McClure with 16, Darrick Jones Jr. with 13 and freshman AJ Dancler with 12. Redshirt freshman Nate Fouts made his collegiate debut and scored 11 points with three assists and two blocked shots. Cleary shot 8 for 10 from the field, while adding seven rebounds and two steals in just 16 minutes. McClure hit six of his seven shots, including 4-for-5 shooting from three-point range. Dancler grabbed five rebounds and dished out five assists. The Dolphins shot 32 for 37 on two-point field goals for the game, including 15 for 16 in the first half.

The Dolphins raced out to an early 10–0 lead in the opener of their four-game California road trip at San Diego on November 17. The early run was sparked by five points from Darrick Jones Jr., who finished with 11 points and three rebounds. With Le Moyne leading by eight at 27–19, the Toreros went on a 17–1 run that pushed them into the lead for good. San Diego opened the second-half scoring with a tree-point play to extend their lead to 12 at 46–34, and the Dolphins responded with a 6–0 run, including four points from Ocypher Owens, who finished with 21 points, eight rebounds and two blocked shots. The Toreros reasserted control over the game with a 22–9 run on their way to an 80–71 victory. Mike DePersia had 12 points, six assists and five steals for the Dolphins.

Ocypher Owens was named an NEC Prime Performer for the season's second week. He averaged 15 points, 5.7 rebounds, two assists, 2.7 blocks and one steal and shot 54.3% during week 2. Through the season's first two weeks, Le Moyne averaged just 9.2 turnovers per game, ranking first in the NEC and 24th in Division I with a 6.6 turnover margin. The Dolphins topped the NEC with an assist-to-turnover ratio of 1.74. Graduate student guard Mike DePersia was the catalyst, leading the NEC in assist-to-turnover ratio at 3.67. DePersia topped the NEC with 4.4 assists per game and had only six turnovers in 129 minutes over the season's first five games.

Le Moyne recorded its first victory over a Division I opponent as a Division I program, an 80–70 win at Cal State Northridge on November 21, in their opening game of the Golden State Hoops Jam, a multi-team event sponsored by Pacific. Luke Sutherland led the Dolphins with 24 points and five rebounds. Le Moyne started five graduate students for the first time in the program's history, and they responded by sprinting to an 11–4 lead to start the game, getting early scoring from Sutherland, Nate McClure (12 points, four rebounds and three steals for the game) and Isaiah Salter. After Le Moyne fell behind, 15–12, Mike DePersia (eight points, nine assists, four rebounds and three steals for the game) sparked a 19–2 run with a pull-up jump shot. The Matadors could not get closer than three points behind the rest of the way. The Dolphins closed out the game with strong free-throw shooting, finishing the game 31 for 34 from the charity stripe.

The Dolphins suffered a heartbreaking defeat when they visited Pacific on November 24, for their final game in the Golden State Hoops Jam. The teams exchanged the lead several times throughout the tightly contested game. With the score tied at halftime, Le Moyne scored the first seven points of the second half to take a 49–42 lead. The Tigers used a timeout and responded by scoring the next six points to cut the Dolphins' lead to one. Le Moyne went ahead, 70–69, on a three-point play by Kaiyem Cleary, who led the team with 19 points and added six rebounds and three steals. Cleary drove the baseline for a dunk and then converted the free throw to complete a three-point play with 2:03 on the clock. Neither team was able to score again until the closing seconds. Lesown Hallums Jr. hit a pair of free throws with 14.4 seconds remaining to put Pacific ahead, 71–70. Mike DePersia, who had his first career double-double with 10 points and a career-high 12 rebounds along with three steals and two assists, drove the lane and drew a foul with 1.9 seconds remaining. He missed the first shot, but made the second to tie the score at 71. The Tigers called timeout and then made a long pass to Hallums, who dribbled once and then hit a fadeaway jump shot from just inside the three-point line at the buzzer to give Pacific the 73–71 victory.

Mike DePersia and Luke Sutherland were both named an NEC Prime Performers for the season's third week. DePersia averaged nine points, eight rebounds, 5.5 assists and three steals and had an 11.0 assist-to-turnover ratio while shooting 50% from the floor. Sutherland averaged 18 points, 3.5 rebounds and one block and shot free throws at a 92.3% clip during week 3.

Le Moyne ranked 293rd of 362 Division I teams in the season's first release of NET rankings by the NCAA on December 4. This was 68 spots higher than the Dolphins' preseason Pomeroy ranking. Le Moyne's initial NET ranking was higher than four of the other eight Northeast Conference teams. Le Moyne's Pomeroy ranking through games of December 3, was 351, up 10 spots from their preseason Pomeroy ranking.

Luke Sutherland scored an NEC season-high 35 points in the inaugural Battle of the Interstate at Binghamton, but it was not enough as Le Moyne fell, 91–79. Sutherland was 12 for 17 from the field, including 5 for 7 from beyond the arc, and hit all six of his free throws. His 35 points were the most by a Le Moyne player since the Dolphins' current head coach, Nate Champion, scored 35 in a November 2013 game that went to overtime. Sutherland also had three rebounds, three assists and two blocked shots. The Bearcats were presented a newly minted trophy to commemorate their victory in front of Binghamton's largest home crowd in nearly two years.

Luke Sutherland was named an NEC Prime Performer for the season's fifth week. He averaged 26 points, 3.5 rebounds and 1.5 blocks and shot free throws while shooting 61.3% from the floor and 57.1% from three-point range during week 5. Through the season's first five weeks, Sutherland was the NEC's leader in free-throw shooting accuracy at 91.2%.

Le Moyne hosted a Division I opponent for the first time since an 88–75 loss to Siena on February 14, 1991, and for the first time since becoming a Division I program, on December 16, when they faced Dartmouth. With the Big Green leading, 8–7, the Dolphins went on a 15–6 run to open an eight-point lead with nine minutes to go in the first half. Kaiyem Cleary had the first eight of the 15 points, and Luke Sutherland scored the final seven during the run. A Trent Mosquera three-pointer stretched Le Moyne's lead to nine points at 32–23 with 4:15 left in the half. However, Dartmouth closed the half with a 13–4 run that tied the score at 36 at the break. The game remained tight in the opening stages of the second half, but the Dolphins closed the game with a 32–9 run over the final 13:12, which included a stretch of 15 straight points scored by Le Moyne. Sutherland had 11 of the 15 points, including three three-pointers and a layup. The Dolphins held the Big Green scoreless over the final 2:51 to secure an 80–54 victory, their first win over an Ivy League opponent. Sutherland finished the game with 24 points, while shooting 10-for-15 from the field and 4-for-8 from behind the arc, and added four rebounds, three assists, two steals and a block. Cleary contributed 19 points, shooting 4 for 6 from the floor and 3 for 4 from three-point range, while collecting six rebounds. Nate McClure had 12 rebounds for the Dolphins.

Luke Sutherland's performance against Dartmouth earned him NEC Player of the Week honors, the first time a Dolphin has been so recognized. Through the first six weeks of the season, Sutherland led the NEC in free-throw shooting at 91.2%. Also on the strength of his game against Dartmouth, Kaiyem Cleary was named an NEC Prime Performer for week 6.

Ocypher Owens was named an NEC Prime Performer for week 7. In the games against Houghton and at Penn State, Owens averaged 19.5 points, 5.5 rebounds. three assists and one steal, shooting 55.6% from the field. His 26 points against Houghton set a new career high.

Ocypher Owens's performance in the Dolphins 78–72 loss at Fairfield on December 30, earned him NEC Prime Performer status for the second consecutive week. Owens had 16 points, eight rebounds, three assists and two steals while shooting 7 for 13 from the floor in the setback.

=== Conference season ===
Le Moyne played its inaugural NEC game on January 6, at Fairleigh Dickinson. Down by 10 points with less than 12 minutes to play, the Dolphins went on an 18–0 run over a stretch of 6:21, sparked by freshman AJ Dancler, who scored eight of his 10 bench points during the run. Le Moyne closed the game by outscoring the Knights, 25–4, over the final 11 minutes. The Dolphins' 18–0 run put them ahead by eight points, but Fairleigh Dickinson answered and cut Le Moyne's lead to 67–63 with less than two minutes to play. The Dolphins' defense shut down the Knights the rest of the game, while Le Moyne, the NEC's leading team in free-throw shooting percentage, hit five of six free throws in the closing moments to put the game away and claim a 74–63 victory. Kaiyem Cleary had 23 points and eight rebounds, both new career highs, for Le Moyne.

Kaiyem Cleary's January 6 performance against Fairleigh Dickinson put him on the list of NEC Prime Performers for week 9.

The Dolphins hosted their first NEC home game when defending conference regular-season and tournament champion Merrimack hit Ted Grant Court on January 13. The Warriors started the game hot and took an early 8–0 lead, holding Le Moyne without a field goal for the first 5:15 of the game. After the Dolphins cut the lead to 8–5, Merrimack went on a 22–7 run over 10 minutes to push their lead to 30–12. Starting the second half down by 15 points, Kaiyem Cleary, who was held scoreless in the first half, hit a three-pointer, and Ocypher Owens scored on a layup to get the Dolphins within 10 points. The game was back and forth for the next few minutes until the Warriors put together a 12–2 run that gave them a 21-point lead with 10:35 to play. Le Moyne responded with a 13–0 run over six minutes to get within eight points. The Dolphins kept chipping away, and a Cleary three-pointer with 40 seconds left cut Merrimack's lead to 61–59. However, Le Moyne was unable to get any closer the rest of the way and fell, 66–62. Cleary finished the game with 16 points. Nate Fouts added 10 points, and AJ Dancler had seven points and six rebounds for the Dolphins.

Kaiyem Cleary was named an NEC Prime Performer for week 10, the second straight week he was so honored. Cleary averaged 17.5 points and 7.5 rebounds per game while shooting 85.7% from the free-throw line during the week. He had a double-double in the Dolphins' January 15 home loss to Sacred Heart.

The Dolphins visited Central Connecticut, undefeated in NEC play, on January 19. The Dolphins made their intentions clear right from the start: They were going to shoot three-pointers, and they scored all their points in building an early 12–5 lead on four triples. The Blue Devils battled back after the slow start and took their first lead, 34–33, 13 seconds before halftime. Kaiyem Cleary's free throws with half a second to play gave Le Moyne a 35–34 lead at the break. The Dolphins went on a 13–4 run, sparked by Nate McClures's six points during the spurt, to build a 53–43 lead with 14:04 to play. Facing a 10-point deficit, Central Connecticut went on a 10–0 run to tie the game at 58 with less than eight minutes remaining. With the Blue Devils holding a 69–67 lead, Darrick Jones Jr. and Mike DePersia hit back-to-back three-pointers to put Le Moyne ahead 73–69 with 1:52 on the clock. The Blue Devils tied the game at 73 on a three-pointer with 54 seconds remaining. After an empty possession for Le Moyne, Central Connecticut called timeout with 23 seconds left. Jordan Jones's layup attempt was off the mark and rebounded by Le Moyne's Nate Fouts, who threw an outlet pass to DePersia. DePersia's bounce pass to a cutting McClure led to a go-ahead layup with 1.2 seconds to go. The Blue Devils' inbounds pass was intercepted by Cleary, giving the Dolphins a 75–73 victory. McClure finished the game with 13 points, shooting 5 for 9. The Dolphins' defense held Allan Jeanne-Rose, who entered the game as the leading scorer in NEC play, to just seven points. Cleary was Le Moyne's leading scorer with 19 points, and he added eight rebounds, three assists, four blocks and three steals.

The Dolphins earned their first NEC home win, beating Saint Francis, 94–57, on January 21. Le Moyne sank 18 three-pointers, the most in an NEC game since February 1998. Six Dolphins scored in double figures led by Luke Sutherland's 18 points, Kaiyem Cleary and Isaiah Salter with 15 points each, Trent Mosquera and Nate Fouts with 11 points each and Darrick Jones Jr., who scored 10. Fouts added a career-high five assists, and Mosquera had three assists and two steals. Jones grabbed six rebounds and dished out four assists. Nate McClure had a game-high nine rebounds. Mike DePersia had six assists and no turnovers.

Kaiyem Cleary earned NEC player of the week honors for week 11. In the Dolphins' two games, Cleary averaged 17.0 points, 5.5 rebounds, 1.5 assists, 2.5 blocks and 2.0 steals per game while shooting 46.2% from three-point range.

Kaiyem Cleary scored 43 points on January 27, to break Le Moyne's single-game individual scoring record, first set on January 7, 1955, and the Dolphins cruised to an 87–74 victory over LIU. Cleary's 43 points were the most scored by a player in regulation and the third most scored by a player in a single game in Division I this season. Cleary was 14 for 25 from the floor, including 6 for 10 from beyond the arc, and shot 9 for 9 from the free-throw line. He also led Le Moyne in rebounds with seven and had a pair of blocked shots. Despite shooting 0 for 6 from three-point range, Luke Sutherland scored 16 points and added five rebounds for the Dolphins. With Le Moyne trailing, 46–45, early in the second half, Cleary scored 13 points over six and a half minutes to spark a decisive 20–4 run that put the Dolphins ahead, 65–50. Cleary's attention-grabbing point total outshined the performance of Tai Strickland, who had a big follow-up game after his buzzer beater two nights earlier gave the Sharks a 63–60 win over Stonehill. Strickland finished the game with 34 points, seven rebounds and three assists in a losing cause. His 34 points were the most surrendered by the Dolphins to an opposing player on Ted Grant Court since January 2018.

Kaiyem Cleary's outstanding performance against LIU earned him NEC player of the week honors for week 12, making him the first player this season to win the award in back to back weeks. He was also named Mid-Major Madness Men's Player of the Week.

Luke Sutherland was named an NEC Prime Performer for week 13. Sutherland had over 20 points in each of the Dolphins' two games during the week, including a game-high 26 in the loss to Sacred Heart. He averaged 23.5 points and five rebounds while shooting 56.8% from the floor and 41.7% from three-point range for the week.

Le Moyne had four players in double figures in their February 8 game at Stonehill, an 88–57 win for the Dolphins. After becoming the first team since 1998, to hit 18 three-pointers in a game on January 21, Le Moyne repeated the feat against the Skyhawks. The Dolphins were 18 for 33 from beyond the arc. Le Moyne became the first NEC team with two wins in league games by 30 or more points this season and the first to earn a 30-point victory on the road since 2018. Kaiyem Cleary led the Dolphins with 16 points and added five rebounds and three assists.

Merrimack went on an 8–0 run late in the first half to break open a close game on their way to a 66–50 home victory over Le Moyne on February 10. Freshman AJ Dancler came off the bench to score a career-high 14 points in 25 minutes for the Dolphins, who posted their lowest scoring output of the season to date. The win was Merrimack's sixth straight, keeping them tied for first place with Central Connecticut at 9–2 in NEC play.

Kaiyem Cleary scored with 45 seconds left in regulation to tie up Le Moyne's home game with Central Connecticut on February 15. After the Blue Devils took a one-point lead in overtime, the Dolphins scored the final six points of the extra session, including a baseline jump shot by Cleary with 1:24 to play that gave Le Moyne the lead for good. Cleary finished with 21 points, 11 rebounds, two assists and two blocked shots. Freshman AJ Dancler had 13 points, four of them in overtime, three assists, two rebounds and two steals in 26 minutes off the bench for the Dolphins. With the win, Le Moyne clinched a berth in the NEC tournament.

The Dolphins recognized former players to celebrate their 75th season and earned a 75–67 victory over Stonehill on February 17. Luke Sutherland led the way for Le Moyne with 23 points, nine rebounds and five assists. Kaiyem Cleary had 14 points and seven rebounds. The Dolphins led the game by 12 points at halftime and were in front, 58–45, when the Skyhawks went on a 13–0 run to tie the game at 58. Once the game was tied, neither team scored for nearly three minutes, until Cleary broke Le Moyne's 7:51 scoring drought with a drive to the basket and then converted the free throw to complete a three-point play. Sutherland followed with a basket from the lane to give the Dolphins a five-point lead. Leading 65–62, Le Moyne got five points from Nate McClure to key a 7–0 run and extend their lead to 10 points with 1:02 to play.

Kaiyem Cleary and Luke Sutherland were both named NEC Prime Performers for week 15. Cleary averaged 17.5 points, nine rebounds and one block, while shooting free throws at an 81.8% clip. Sutherland averaged 19 points, eight rebounds, three assists and 3.5 steals per game, shooting 50% from the floor.

The Dolphins' hopes for a home game in the NEC tournament took a blow, when they fell to Fairleigh Dickinson, 68–58, on February 24, which was senior day at Le Moyne. The teams were tied at 49 with 5:16 to play, when the Knights went on an 11–2 run over three minutes. Kaiyem Cleary had a double-double with 18 points and a career-high 14 rebounds for the Dolphins.

Le Moyne took control of the race for the no. 4 seed and home-court advantage in the NEC quarterfinals with a 70–56 home win over Wagner on February 29. Darrick Jones Jr. led the Dolphins with a career-high 21 points on 8-for-14 shooting, including 5 for 9 from three-point range. Le Moyne broke open a close game in the middle part of the first half with a 9–2 run, sparked by Nate Fouts, who have five points and an assist during the spurt. Jones scored five points during an early second-half run that extended the Dolphins' lead to 42–26. After Wagner went on a 13–4 run to close the gap to eight points, Le Moyne responded with a 15–4 run that put the game away. Luke Sutherland scored 14 points and had a game-high four assists, and Kaiyem Cleary had 12 points and nine rebounds for the Dolphins.

Entering the final day of the regular season, Le Moyne had the opportunity to earn the no. 4 seed in the NEC tournament and home-court advantage in the NEC quarterfinals with a win. If the Dolphins were to lose, the no. 4 seed would go to the winner of the season finale between Fairleigh Dickinson and Wagner scheduled for the same day.

Le Moyne claimed the no. 4 seed in the NEC tournament and home-court advantage in the NEC quarterfinals with a 74–58 win at Saint Francis on March 2. Luke Sutherland led the Dolphins with 22 points, shooting 8 for 10 from the field and 3 for 4 from beyond the arc, seven rebounds, a career-high eight assists, two blocked shots and one steal. After the Red Flash took a 3–0 lead, Le Moyne went on a 10–0 run, keyed by five points from Nate McClure, and led the rest of the way. After a Saint Francis run cut the Dolphins lead to 25–24, the Dolphins answered with an 11–4 run, getting five of their points from Darrick Jones Jr., to reassert control. A late flurry by the Red Flash cut the Le Moyne lead to 39–34 at the break. The Dolphins scored the first nine points of the second half to build a 14-point lead. However, Le Moyne had a 5:10 scoring drought during which Saint Francis had only four points but cut the lead to nine with 8:47 remaining. Saint Francis continued to creep closer and found themselves trailing 60–52 with 6:33 to play. The Dolphins extinguished any hopes for a comeback with a 14–0 run over a span of 3:42 and led by 22 points with 2:34 on the clock.

Luke Sutherland was named an NEC Prime Performer for the final week of the regular season. In the Dolphins' victories over Wagner and Saint Francis, Sutherland averaged 18 points, five rebounds, six assists and 1.5 blocks, while shooting 65% from the field, 66.7% from three-point range and 100% from the free-throw line.

Kaiyem Cleary was named first-team All-NEC. Luke Sutherland was named to the all-conference second team.

=== Postseason ===
Powered by Luke Sutherland's 22 points, Le Moyne cruised to an 82–61 wire-to-wire victory over Fairleigh Dickinson in the program's Division I postseason debut on March 6. The Dolphins opened the game with three three-pointers to take a 9–0 lead just 1:45 into the contest. The Knights settled down, and Le Moyne was up, 42–34, at intermission. Leading 46–40 in the second half, the Dolphins went on an 11–0 run over 2:09 to take a 57–40 lead with 15:42 remaining. Fairleigh Dickinson got no closer than 12 points behind the rest of the way. Darrick Jones Jr. scored 17 points for Le Moyne.

After Le Moyne jumped out to an early 13–4 lead in the NEC semifinals on March 9, Merrimack's defense got the Warriors back into the game, and a 19–3 run in the later part of the first half helped them build a 28–20 lead at intermission. The Dolphins cut the deficit to three with 14:47 to play on a put-back by Kaiyem Cleary. The teams traded three-pointers over the next three minutes, until Samba Diallo's layups on consecutive possessions extended Merrimack's lead to seven points. The Dolphins responded with a 6–2 run to get within three points at 40–37 with 8:14 to play. An 8–2 Warriors run gave them a nine-point lead with 6:45 on the clock, but Le Moyne responded with a pair of three-pointers by Luke Sutherland to pull within three again with 5:42 to play. After each team had two empty possessions over the next two minutes, Bryan Etumnu was fouled on a layup and completed the three-point play, sparking a 9–2 Merrimack run that put the game away. The Warriors' 61–51 victory ended the Dolphins' inaugural Division I season. NEC Rookie of the Year Adam "Budd" Clark scored 24 points to lead Merrimack. Sutherland had 23 points and eight rebounds for Le Moyne, and he was named to the NEC All-Tournament Team.

Kaiyem Cleary was named second-team All-District 15 by the National Association of Basketball Coaches.

=== Notable statistics ===
Kaiyem Cleary led the NEC in free-throw shooting at 83.2%. Cleary was also fifth in the league in scoring average at 15.3 points per game. Luke Sutherland's 15.5 points per game were good for third in the NEC. He was also third in three-point field-goal percentage at 39.6%. Darrick Jones Jr. hit 40.4% of his three-point attempts, ranking second in the NEC.

=== Final rankings ===
The Dolphins ended the season with a NET ranking of 302 out of 364 teams, and a final KenPom rating of 302.

== Roster ==
2023–24 Le Moyne Dolphins men's basketball team
Players
Coaches

Pos.	#	Name	Height	Weight	Year	Previous school	Hometown
G	1	Darrick Jr. Jones	6 ft 5 in (1.96 m)	200 lb (91 kg)	Sr	Towson	Richmond, VA
G	2	Kaiyem Cleary	6 ft 6 in (1.98 m)	185 lb (84 kg)	GS	Ball State	Manchester, England
G	3	Mike DePersia	5 ft 11 in (1.8 m)	175 lb (79 kg)	GS	IUPUI	Cherry Hill, NJ
G	4	Mason Landdeck (redshirt)	6 ft 2 in (1.88 m)	170 lb (77 kg)	Jr	Hawaii Pacific	Cashmere, WA
G	5	Isaiah Salter	6 ft 0 in (1.83 m)	160 lb (73 kg)	GS	Adelphi	Charlotte, NC
F	10	Jamel Melvin (injured) (redshirt)	6 ft 11 in (2.11 m)	210 lb (95 kg)	Jr	Northern Colorado	Upper Marlboro, MD
G	11	AJ Dancler	6 ft 2 in (1.88 m)	160 lb (73 kg)	Fr	Southport High School	Indianapolis, IN
G	13	Deng Garang (W) (redshirt)	6 ft 6 in (1.98 m)	165 lb (75 kg)	Fr	Bishop Grimes High School	Syracuse, NY
G	14	C.J. Moore (W)	5 ft 8 in (1.73 m)	160 lb (73 kg)	So	St. Francis High School	Lancaster, NY
G	21	Trent Mosquera	6 ft 4 in (1.93 m)	215 lb (98 kg)	So	Belmont Hill School	Brookline, MA
G	22	Kaelin Thomas (W)	6 ft 1 in (1.85 m)	160 lb (73 kg)	RS Fr	Seton Catholic Central	Binghamton, NY
F	23	Luke Sutherland	6 ft 7 in (2.01 m)	220 lb (100 kg)	GS	Bryant	Syracuse, NY
F	24	Ocypher Owens	6 ft 8 in (2.03 m)	200 lb (91 kg)	Jr	Indian River State	Orlando, FL
F	25	Nate Fouts (FW)	6 ft 7 in (2.01 m)	215 lb (98 kg)	RS Fr	Kimball Union Academy	Skaneateles, NY
G	35	Nate McClure	6 ft 4 in (1.93 m)	190 lb (86 kg)	GS	IUPUI	Houston, TX

Head coach

- Nate Champion (Le Moyne)

Assistant coach(es)

- Ben Swank (Edinboro)
- Jamie Young (Blackburn)
- Ben Marello (Florida Southern)

Legend

- (C) Team captain
- (S) Suspended
- (I) Ineligible
- (W) Walk-on
- (FW) Former walk-on
- Injured
- Current redshirt

Roster
Last update: March 7, 2024

== Schedule and results ==
Date time, TV	Rank^{#}	Opponent^{#}	Result	Record	High points	High rebounds	High assists	Site (attendance) city, state
Non-conference regular season
November 7, 2023*; 7:00 p.m., FS2		at Georgetown	L 57–94	0–1	11 – Cleary	7 – Cleary	3 – Mosquera	Capital One Arena (9,335); Washington, D.C.
November 10, 2023*; 6:30 p.m., FS1		at No. 22 Villanova	L 57–83	0–2	15 – Sutherland	6 – Cleary	6 – DePersia	Finneran Pavilion (6,501); Villanova, PA
November 13, 2023*; 7:00 p.m., NEC Front Row		SUNY Canton	W 105–46	1–2	21 – Cleary	7 – 2 tied	5 – Dancler	Ted Grant Court (405); DeWitt, NY
November 17, 2023*; 10:00 p.m., ESPN+		at San Diego	L 71–80	1–3	21 – Owens	8 – Owens	6 – DePersia	Jenny Craig Pavilion (437); San Diego, CA
November 19, 2023*; 10:00 p.m., ESPN+		at UC Santa Barbara	L 72–96	1–4	16 – Owens	4 – 2 tied	5 – DePersia	The Thunderdome (1,756); Isla Vista, CA
November 21, 2023*; 10:00 p.m., ESPN+		at Cal State Northridge; Golden State Hoops Jam (Pacific MTE)	W 80–70	2–4	24 – Sutherland	5 – 2 tied	9 – DePersia	Premier America Credit Union Arena (387); Northridge, CA
November 24, 2023*; 10:00 p.m., ESPN+		at Pacific; Golden State Hoops Jam (Pacific MTE)	L 71–73	2–5	19 – Cleary	12 – DePersia	2 – 2 tied	Alex G. Spanos Center (696); Stockton, CA
November 29, 2023*; 7:00 p.m., NEC Front Row		Fredonia	W 92–54	3–5	19 – Sutherland	7 – Jones	4 – Mosquera	Ted Grant Court (294); DeWitt, NY
December 5, 2023*; 6:00 p.m., ESPN+		at Army	L 51–68	3–6	17 – Sutherland	8 – Owens	5 – DePersia	Christl Arena (428); West Point, NY
December 9, 2023*; 2:00 p.m., ESPN+		at Binghamton; Battle of the Interstate	L 79–91	3–7	35 – Sutherland	7 – DePersia	4 – Salter	Binghamton University Events Center (3,583); Vestal, NY
December 16, 2023*; 2:00 p.m., NEC Front Row		Dartmouth	W 80–54	4–7	24 – Sutherland	12 – McClure	3 – 4 tied	Ted Grant Court (480); DeWitt, NY
December 18, 2023*; 7:00 p.m., NEC Front Row		Houghton	W 92–72	5–7	26 – Owens	6 – 2 tied	6 – DePersia	Ted Grant Court (292); DeWitt, NY
December 21, 2023*; 7:00 p.m., Peacock		at Penn State	L 55–72	5–8	14 – Cleary	7 – Cleary	3 – 2 tied	Bryce Jordan Center (5,023); College Township, PA
December 30, 2023*; 2:00 p.m., ESPN+		at Fairfield	L 72–78	5–9	16 – 2 tied	9 – Sutherland	6 – DePersia	Leo D. Mahoney Arena (2,211); Fairfield, CT
NEC regular season
January 6, 2024; 2:00 p.m., YES		at Fairleigh Dickinson	W 74–63	6–9 (1–0)	23 – Cleary	8 – Cleary	4 – McClure	Rothman Center (273); Hackensack, NJ
January 13, 2024; 2:00 p.m., NEC Front Row		Merrimack	L 62–66	6–10 (1–1)	16 – Cleary	7 – 2 tied	3 – Mosquera	Ted Grant Court (466); DeWitt, NY
January 15, 2024; 7:00 p.m., NEC Front Row		Sacred Heart	L 73–80	6–11 (1–2)	19 – Cleary	11 – Cleary	6 – DePersia	Ted Grant Court (483); DeWitt, NY
January 19, 2024; 7:00 p.m., NEC Front Row		at Central Connecticut	W 75–73	7–11 (2–2)	19 – Cleary	9 – McClure	4 – DePersia	William H. Detrick Gymnasium (1,182); New Britain, CT
January 21, 2024; 2:00 p.m., NEC Front Row		Saint Francis	W 94–57	8–11 (3–2)	18 – Sutherland	9 – McClure	6 – DePersia	Ted Grant Court (794); DeWitt, NY
January 27, 2024; 2:00 p.m., NEC Front Row		LIU	W 87–74	9–11 (4–2)	43 – Cleary	7 – Cleary	7 – Salter	Ted Grant Court (943); DeWitt, NY
February 1, 2024; 7:00 p.m., NEC Front Row		at Wagner	L 57–80	9–12 (4–3)	21 – Sutherland	7 – McClure	3 – 3 tied	Spiro Sports Center (1,093); Staten Island, NY
February 3, 2024; 2:00 p.m., NEC Front Row		at Sacred Heart	L 81–87	9–13 (4–4)	26 – Sutherland	6 – 2 tied	7 – Salter	William H. Pitt Center (597); Fairfield, CT
February 8, 2024; 7:00 p.m., NEC Front Row		at Stonehill	W 88–57	10–13 (5–4)	16 – Cleary	6 – Jones	7 – Salter	Merkert Gymnasium (571); Easton, MA
February 10, 2024; 3:00 p.m., ESPN+		at Merrimack	L 50–66	10–14 (5–5)	14 – Dancler	9 – Cleary	4 – Jones	Hammel Court (782); North Andover, MA
February 15, 2024; 7:00 p.m., NEC Front Row		Central Connecticut	W 69–64 ^{OT}	11–14 (6–5)	21 – Cleary	11 – Cleary	5 – Salter	Ted Grant Court (569); DeWitt, NY
February 17, 2024; 2:00 p.m., YES, ESPN+		Stonehill	W 75–67	12–14 (7–5)	23 – Sutherland	9 – Sutherland	5 – Sutherland	Ted Grant Court (957); DeWitt, NY
February 22, 2024; 7:00 pm, NEC Front Row		at LIU	L 64–76	12–15 (7–6)	18 – Sutherland	8 – Cleary	5 – Sutherland	Steinberg Wellness Center (347); Brooklyn, NY
February 24, 2024; 2:00 p.m., NEC Front Row		Fairleigh Dickinson; Senior Day	L 58–68	12–16 (7–7)	18 – Cleary	14 – Cleary	4 – DePersia	Ted Grant Court (558); DeWitt, NY
February 29, 2024; 7:00 p.m., NEC Front Row		Wagner	W 70–56	13–16 (8–7)	21 – Jones	9 – 2 tied	4 – Sutherland	Ted Grant Court (570); DeWitt, NY
March 2, 2024; 4:00 p.m., NEC Front Row		at Saint Francis	W 74–58	14–16 (9–7)	22 – Sutherland	7 – Sutherland	8 – Sutherland	DeGol Arena (727); Loretto, PA
NEC tournament
March 6, 2024*; 7:00 p.m., NEC Front Row	(4)	(5) Fairleigh Dickinson; Quarterfinals	W 82–61	15–16	22 – Sutherland	8 – Owens	8 – DePersia	Ted Grant Court (861); DeWitt, NY
March 9, 2024*; 12:00 p.m., YES/ESPN+	(4)	at (2) Merrimack; Semifinals	L 51–61	15–17	23 – Sutherland	8 – Sutherland	2 – 4 tied	Lawler Arena (1,565); North Andover, MA
*Non-conference game. ^{#}Rankings from AP poll. (#) Tournament seedings in parentheses. All times are in Eastern.

== Awards and honors ==
District 15 honors
Honors	Player	Position	Ref.
NABC All-District 15 Second Team	Kaiyem Cleary	G	

Conference season and tournament honors
Honors	Player	Position	Ref.
NEC All-Tournament Team	Luke Sutherland	F	
All-NEC First Team	Kaiyem Cleary	G	
All-NEC Second Team	Luke Sutherland	F	

Weekly honors and awards
Honors	Player	Position	Date awarded	Ref.
NEC Prime Performer	Ocypher Owens	F	November 20, 2023	
NEC Prime Performer	Mike DePersia	G	November 27, 2023	
NEC Prime Performer	Luke Sutherland	F	November 27, 2023	
NEC Prime Performer	Luke Sutherland	F	December 11, 2023	
NEC Player of the Week	Luke Sutherland	F	December 18, 2023	
NEC Prime Performer	Kaiyem Cleary	G	December 18, 2023	
NEC Prime Performer	Ocypher Owens	F	December 26, 2023	
NEC Prime Performer	Ocypher Owens	F	January 2, 2024	
NEC Prime Performer	Kaiyem Cleary	G	January 8, 2024	
NEC Prime Performer	Kaiyem Cleary	G	January 17, 2024	
NEC Player of the Week	Kaiyem Cleary	G	January 23, 2024	
NEC Player of the Week	Kaiyem Cleary	G	January 29, 2024	
NEC Prime Performer	Luke Sutherland	F	February 5, 2024	
NEC Prime Performer	Kaiyem Cleary	G	February 19, 2024	
NEC Prime Performer	Luke Sutherland	F	February 19, 2024	
NEC Prime Performer	Luke Sutherland	F	March 4, 2024	

== Player statistics ==
Individual player statistics
			Minutes		Scoring		Field-goal shooting			Three-point shooting			Free-throw shooting			Rebounds				Assists		Steals		Blocks			
Player	GP	GS	Tot	Avg	Pts	Avg	FG	FGA	Pct	3FG	3FA	Pct	FT	FTA	Pct	Off	Def	Tot	Avg	Tot	Avg	Tot	Avg	Tot	Avg	PF	TO
Luke Sutherland	32	32	872	27.3	496	15.5	186	380	48.9%	65	164	39.6%	59	69	85.5%	29	111	140	4.4	59	1.8	13	0.41	25	0.78	49	50
Kaiyem Cleary	30	28	846	28.2	458	15.3	159	357	44.5%	51	146	34.9%	89	107	83.2%	36	160	196	6.5	36	1.2	31	1.03	22	0.73	71	64
Darrick Jones Jr.	28	17	622	22.2	238	8.5	74	174	42.5%	40	99	40.4%	50	64	78.1%	27	51	78	2.8	28	1.0	18	0.64	5	0.18	41	26
Ocypher Owens	22	10	472	21.5	179	8.1	72	161	44.7%	14	44	31.8%	21	34	61.8%	26	66	92	4.2	31	1.4	14	0.64	24	1.09	34	29
Nate McClure	32	30	884	27.6	205	6.4	70	168	41.7%	36	107	33.6%	29	39	74.4%	42	94	136	4.3	55	1.7	45	1.40	3	0.09	57	24
Isaiah Salter	32	10	767	24.0	186	5.8	62	159	39.0%	35	102	34.3%	27	34	79.4%	16	44	60	1.9	77	2.4	48	1.50	2	0.06	42	34
AJ Dancler	30	0	442	14.7	170	5.7	54	134	40.3%	22	65	33.8%	40	53	75.5%	8	59	67	2.2	38	1.3	14	0.47	1	0.03	47	36
Trent Mosquera	26	0	373	14.3	140	5.4	53	132	40.2%	23	81	28.4%	11	14	78.6%	7	40	47	1.8	39	1.5	11	0.42	8	0.31	32	22
Nate Fouts	21	1	253	12.0	90	4.3	39	77	50.6%	9	23	39.1%	3	11	27.3%	5	39	44	2.1	24	1.1	5	0.24	8	0.38	22	19
Mike DePersia	32	32	828	25.9	136	4.3	46	139	33.1%	16	65	24.6%	28	44	63.6%	26	100	126	3.9	111	3.5	55	1.72	5	0.16	87	33
Kaelin Thomas	9	0	34	3.8	14	1.6	6	13	46.2%	2	4	50.0%	0	0	–	2	2	4	0.4	4	0.4	0	0.00	0	0.00	3	0
CJ Moore	8	0	32	4.0	6	0.8	2	12	16.7%	2	10	20.0%	0	0	–	0	1	1	0.1	1	0.1	2	0.25	0	0.00	4	0
Team																46	56	102	3.2								30
Le Moyne	32	32	6,425	200.8	2,318	72.4	823	1,906	43.2%	315	910	34.6%	357	469	76.1%	270	823	1,093	34.2	503	15.7	256	8.00	103	3.22	489	367
Opponents	32	32	6,425	200.8	2,245	70.2	811	1,916	42.3%	273	829	32.9%	350	492	71.1%	355	870	1,225	38.3	459	14.3	200	6.25	76	2.38	444	424

Legend
GP	Games played	GS	Games started	Tot	Total
Avg	Average per game	Pts	Points	FG	Field goals made
FGA	Field-goal attempts	Pct	Percentage	3FG	Three-point field goals made
3FA	Three-point field-goal attempts	FT	Free throws made	FTA	Free-throw attempts
Off	Offensive rebounds	Def	Defensive rebounds	PF	Personal fouls
TO	Turnovers	High	Team high

== Media coverage ==
Every Dolphins game was broadcast live on Fox Sports Radio affiliates WOLF at 1490 AM and 92.5 FM in Syracuse and WOSW at 1300 AM and 92.5 FM in Oswego County. Le Moyne alumni Chris Granozio and Don Familo called the games with Granozio handling the play-by-play and Familo providing the analysis and color. Dolphins road games versus conference opponents and all their home games, except for the February 17 game against Stonehill, was streamed live and available for free on NEC Front Row, the Northeast Conference's streaming platform. The radio feed with Granozio and Familo on the call was heard on Dolphins home games that streamed on NEC Front Row. The home game versus Stonehill was televised by YES with a stream simulcast by ESPN+. Television or streaming coverage of non-conference road games was available on the media outlets with which the opponent had made arrangements.
