= 2025–26 Le Moyne Dolphins men's basketball team =

College basketball team season

2025–26 Le Moyne Dolphins men's basketball
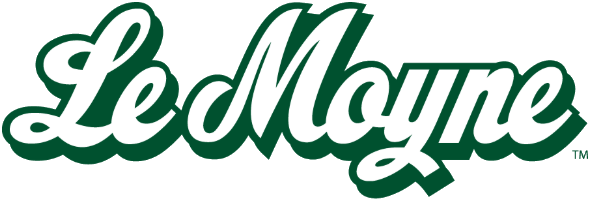
- Conference: NEC
- Record: 15–17 (10–8 NEC)
- Head coach: Nate Champion (6th (Note: Le Moyne did not play during the 2020–21 season due to the COVID-19 pandemic. Consequently, this is Champion's seventh year as the team's head coach but only his sixth season.) season)
- Assistant coaches: Jamie Young (2nd season); Ben Marello (6th season); Serge Clement (1st season)
- Home arena: Le Moyne Events Center (capacity: 2,000); DeWitt, New York (Note: The campus, including the Le Moyne Events Center, has a Syracuse mailing address but lies primarily within the adjacent town of DeWitt.)

Uniform
Home	Away

2025–26 NEC men's basketball standings
	Conf.				Overall
Team	W		L	PCT	W		L	PCT
LIU †	15	–	3	.833	24	–	10	.706
Central Connecticut	12	–	6	.667	18	–	12	.600
Mercyhurst *	10	–	8	.556	17	–	17	.500
Le Moyne *	10	–	8	.556	15	–	17	.469
New Haven **	9	–	9	.500	14	–	17	.452
Stonehill	8	–	10	.444	12	–	21	.364
Fairleigh Dickinson	8	–	10	.444	11	–	21	.344
Wagner	8	–	10	.444	14	–	17	.452
Chicago State	5	–	13	.278	7	–	25	.219
Saint Francis	5	–	13	.278	7	–	24	.226
† 2026 NEC tournament winner * ineligible for the 2026 NCAA tournament due to transition from Division II ** ineligible for both the 2026 NEC tournament and the 2026 NCAA tournament due to transition from Division II; As of March 10, 2026

The 2025–26 Le Moyne Dolphins men's basketball team represented Le Moyne College during the 2025–26 NCAA Division I men's basketball season. The Dolphins, led by sixth-season head coach Nate Champion, played their home games on Ted Grant Court in the Le Moyne Events Center in DeWitt, New York as third-year members of the NEC and NCAA Division I. This was the 77th season of Le Moyne Dolphins men's basketball.

This was the third season of Le Moyne's transition to Division I. Consequently, the team was ineligible for NCAA-sponsored postseason play.

== Previous season ==
The Dolphins finished the 2024–25 season 9–23, 4–12 in NEC play, tied for eighth place. As the no. 8 seed in the NEC tournament, they lost to Central Connecticut in the quarterfinals.

== Offseason ==
Following the 2024–25 season, Will Amica and Freds Pauls Bagatskis left the team. Zek Tekin left school and signed with Galatasaray S.K. of the Turkish Basketball Super League. Robby Carmody graduated. Darrick Jones Jr. entered the transfer portal on March 25. AJ Dancler transferred to Coastal Carolina on March 31. Ocypher Owens transferred to Tarleton State on April 16. Dwayne Koroma transferred to UConn on May 30. Dancler was second-team all-NEC and led the Dolphins in scoring, assists, three-point shooting and minutes played. Koroma led the team in rebounding and steals and led the NEC in field-goal percentage. Owens led Le Moyne in shot blocking. Amica was the Dolphins' best free-throw shooter.

Eli Greenberg, a 6'4" point guard from Centerville High School in Ohio, committed to Le Moyne on September 2, 2024. He signed on November 13. Josiah Lee, a 6'2" point guard from Glacier Peak High School in Snohomish, Washington, signed with Le Moyne on November 19, 2024.

Shilo Jackson, a 6'9" forward from Indianapolis, transferred to Le Moyne from Texas A&M–Corpus Christi as a redshirt senior on April 17. In 26 appearances during his redshirt junior season, Jackson shot 60% from the floor and averaged 4.2 points and 2.5 rebounds in 11 minutes per game.

Jakai Sanders, a 6'3" point guard from Brooklyn, transferred to Le Moyne from Saint Peter's as a sophomore on May 2. Sanders averaged 2.4 points, one assist and 11 minutes in 13 games as a freshman.

Tennessee Rainwater, a 6'6" swingman from Davenport, Washington, transferred to Le Moyne from Utah Tech as a junior on May 15. Rainwater averaged 5.9 points, 2.9 rebounds and 16 minutes in 30 games, six of them starts, as a sophomore.

Ametri Moss committed to enroll as a graduate student at Le Moyne on May 19. Moss, a 6'0" point guard from Clarksville, Tennessee, played two seasons at North Florida following two seasons as a junior college player at State College of Florida, Manatee–Sarasota and has a year of eligibility remaining under the NCAA blanket waiver. Moss came off the bench to play in 31 of North Florida's 32 games during the 2024–25 season, and averaged 5.3 points and 2.3 assists in 14 minutes per game.

Samuel Hincapie, a 6'5" shooting guard from Medellín, Colombia, transferred to Le Moyne from Lake Land, where he was a junior college player the previous two seasons, on May 20. As a sophomore, Hincapie averaged 17.2 points, 5.2 rebounds and 2.0 assists per game and shot 67% from the field.

Trevor Roe, who took a medical redshirt the previous season, returned to action for this campaign. However, Roe's cousin, Nate Fouts, was injured during the offseason and was a medical redshirt this season.

Assistant coach Elijah Burns left Le Moyne and became an assistant at Albany in June. Assistant coach Ben Swank left Le Moyne and became an assistant at Tampa on August 11.

After a year at Villanova, Jamie Young returned to Le Moyne for his second season as an assistant coach. The Dolphins announced the hiring of Serge Clement as an assistant coach on August 1. Clement served as assistant coach and defensive coordinator of 2024–25 Atlantic 10 regular-season co-champion George Mason, which ranked third nationally in field goal percentage defense and finished in the top 25 in overall team defense among Division I programs. The Atlantic 10 title was the first for George Mason, which set a new program record with 27 wins. Clement previously served as an assistant at Hofstra, Marist and Saint Peter's. He earned his bachelor's degree from the State University of New York at Potsdam and his master's degree from State University of New York at Cortland.

=== Departures ===
Le Moyne departures
Name	No.	Pos.	Height	Weight	2024–25 class	Hometown	Reason for departure
AJ Dancler	0	G	6'2"	175	Sophomore	Indianapolis, IN	Transferred to Coastal Carolina
Darrick Jones Jr.	1	G	6'5"	200	5th-year senior	Richmond, VA	Entered the transfer portal
Dwayne Koroma	3	F	6'8"	205	(redshirt) Junior	Berlin, Germany	Transferred to UConn
Zek Tekin	4	G	6'2"	170	Junior	Istanbul, Türkiye	Left school; undrafted in 2025 NBA draft; signed with Galatasaray S.K.
Robby Carmody	11	G	6'4"	195	Graduate student	Mars, PA	Graduated; undrafted in 2025 NBA draft
Freds Pauls Bagatskis	12	F	6'8"	180	Junior	Riga, Latvia	Left team
Will Amica	22	G	6'0"	170	Graduate student	Syracuse, NY	Left team
Ocypher Owens	24	F	6'8"	215	Senior	Orlando, FL	Transferred to Tarleton State

=== Additions ===
==== Incoming transfers ====
Le Moyne incoming transfers
Name	No.	Pos.	Height	Weight	2025–26 class	Hometown	Previous school	Years rem.	Date comm.
Samuel Hincapie	12	G	6'5"	175	Junior	Medellín, Colombia	Lake Land	2	May 20, 2025
Shilo Jackson	4	F	6'9"	225	(redshirt) Senior	Indianapolis, IN	Texas A&M–Corpus Christi	1	April 17, 2025
Ametri Moss	0	G	6'0"	175	Graduate student	Clarksville, TN	North Florida	1	May 19, 2025
Tennessee Rainwater	1	G/F	6'6"	210	Junior	Davenport, WA	Utah Tech	2	May 15, 2025
Jakai Sanders	2	G	6'3"	200	Sophomore	Brooklyn, NY	Saint Peter's	3	May 2, 2025

==== 2025 recruiting class ====
Le Moyne incoming recruits
Name	Number	Pos.	Height	Weight	Hometown	High school	RPS†
Eli Greenberg	3	G	6'4"	165	Centerville, OH	Centerville	2.77
Josiah Lee	11	G	6'2"	165	Snohomish, WA	Glacier Peak	3.14
† Verbal Commits Recruitment Power Score on a scale of 0 to 5

==== 2026 recruiting class ====
2026 Le Moyne incoming recruits signed before the end of the season
Name	Number	Pos.	Height	Weight	Hometown	High school	RPS†
Jordan Dill	4	PG	6'1"	190	Philadelphia, PA	Imhotep Institute Charter	3.16
Hunter Frazier		PF	6'8"		Brooklyn, NY	Eagle Academy for Young Men at Ocean Hill	2.88
† Verbal Commits Recruitment Power Score on a scale of 0 to 5

== Preseason polls ==
=== NEC poll ===
The NEC released its preseason coaches poll on October 27, 2025. The Dolphins were picked to finish ninth in the conference.

Rank	Team
1	LIU (unanimous)
2	Central Connecticut
3	Stonehill
4	Mercyhurst
5	Fairleigh Dickinson
6	Chicago State
7	Saint Francis
8	Wagner
9	Le Moyne
10	New Haven

() first-place votes

=== KenPom rating ===
Le Moyne was ranked 339th of 365 Division I teams in the preseason Pomeroy ratings.

=== Preseason all-conference team ===
No Dolphins were selected as members of the NEC preseason all-conference team.

== Season highlights ==
=== Pre-conference season ===
The Dolphins opened their season with a 94–50 home victory over Division III SUNY Cobleskill. Le Moyne's 12–0 run in the middle of the first half gave the Dolphins a 14-point lead that they extended to 20 by halftime. Le Moyne's lead was never smaller than 20 points in the second half. Deng Garang scored 16 points on 7-for-11 shooting from the field to lead four Dolphins in double figures and added five rebounds, three assists and a block. Trevor Roe made his Le Moyne debut, after sitting out the previous season with an injury, and tallied nine points while grabbings six rebounds. Graduate student transfer Ametri Moss started at point guard for the Dolphins and registered five points, four assists, four steals, three rebounds and no turnovers in 19 minutes. Freshmen Eli Greenberg and Josiah Lee each scored 12 points in their collegiate debuts. This was the first time Le Moyne opened their season at home since the 2010–11 season.

The Dolphins met fellow Jesuit school Xavier for the first time to open their road schedule. Despite the Musketeers being heavy favorites, Le Moyne never trailed by more than 10 points and was down by three after Ametri Moss hit a jump shot with 2:37 to play. From there, Xavier hit five of their six free throws, while the Dolphins were 0 for 2 at the line and 1 for 3 from three-point range and committed a turnover, falling, 74–69. Trent Mosquera scored a game-high 20 points for Le Moyne. Moss finished with 10 points, seven rebounds, five assists and two steals. Shilo Jackson added six points, six rebounds, six assists, three blocks and two steals for the Dolphins.

Trent Mosquera was named an NEC Prime Performer for the season's first week after registering a pair of 20-point performances in the season's first three games.

Jakai Sanders was named an NEC Prime Performer for the season's second week after scoring a career-high 17 points, shooting 5 for 10 from the floor, 2 for 2 from three-point range and 5 for 5 from the free-throw line, in the Dolphins' 94–80 loss at UMass on November 13.

Shilo Jackson recorded a double-double with 17 points and 11 rebounds to lead the Dolphins to their first win of the season over a Division I opponent, a 74–68 home triumph over Niagara on November 17. Le Moyne led, 51–50, with 9:29 to play and broke the game open with a 12–1 run over the next 5:14. Seven of the Dolphins' 12 points during the spurt were scored at the free-throw line. Niagara made a late charge and got within a point with 1:39 remaining. Jackson answered with a jumper, a rebound of Niagara's missed layup and a pass to Jakai Sanders, who converted a three-point play after making a layup for a six-point Dolphin lead with 22 seconds left. Deng Garang matched Jackson's game-high 17 points for Le Moyne, and Sanders added 14 points and six assists. This was Le Moyne's first win over the Purple Eagles in the ninth meeting between the programs. The Dolphins improved to 2–3 on the season.

Shilo Jackson was named an NEC Prime Performer for the season's third week after averaging 17.5 points, 10 rebounds, 1.5 assists and 1.5 blocks, while shooting 67% from the floor and 92% from the free-throw line in two games.

== Roster ==
2025–26 Le Moyne Dolphins men's basketball team
Players
Coaches

Pos.	#	Name	Height	Weight	Year	Previous school	Hometown
G	0	Ametri Moss (injured) (redshirt)	6 ft 0 in (1.83 m)	170 lb (77 kg)	GS	North Florida	Clarksville, TN
G/F	1	Tennessee Rainwater	6 ft 6 in (1.98 m)	210 lb (95 kg)	Jr	Utah Tech	Davenport, WA
G	2	Jakai Sanders	6 ft 3 in (1.91 m)	200 lb (91 kg)	So	Saint Peter's	Brooklyn, NY
G	3	Eli Greenberg	6 ft 4 in (1.93 m)	165 lb (75 kg)	Fr	Centerville	Centerville, OH
F	4	Shilo Jackson	6 ft 9 in (2.06 m)	225 lb (102 kg)	RS Sr	Texas A&M–Corpus Christi	Indianapolis, IN
F	5	Trevor Roe	6 ft 9 in (2.06 m)	210 lb (95 kg)	RS So	Radford	Syracuse, NY
G	7	Trent Mosquera	6 ft 5 in (1.96 m)	210 lb (95 kg)	RS Jr	Belmont Hill School	Brookline, MA
G	10	Jakob Blakley	6 ft 0 in (1.83 m)	170 lb (77 kg)	So	Walter Payton Prep	Elgin, IL
G	11	Josiah Lee	6 ft 2 in (1.88 m)	165 lb (75 kg)	Fr	Glacier Peak	Snohomish, WA
G	12	Samuel Hincapie	6 ft 5 in (1.96 m)	175 lb (79 kg)	Jr	Lake Land	Medellín, Colombia
G	13	Deng Garang (W)	6 ft 6 in (1.98 m)	180 lb (82 kg)	RS So	Bishop Grimes	Syracuse, NY
F	15	Nate Fouts (injured) (FW) (redshirt)	6 ft 8 in (2.03 m)	215 lb (98 kg)	RS Jr	Kimball Union Academy	Skaneateles, NY
G	22	Kaelin Thomas (W)	6 ft 2 in (1.88 m)	170 lb (77 kg)	RS Jr	Seton Catholic Central	Binghamton, NY
F	32	Isaac Nyakundi	6 ft 9 in (2.06 m)	220 lb (100 kg)	So	MacDuffie	Duluth, MN
G	33	Sam Donnelly (W, 2G)	6 ft 2 in (1.88 m)	200 lb (91 kg)	GS	Vernon-Verona-Sherrill	Vernon, NY

Head coach

- Nate Champion (Le Moyne)

Assistant coach(es)

- Jamie Young (Blackburn)
- Ben Marello (Florida Southern)
- Serge Clement (SUNY Potsdam, SUNY Cortland)

Legend

- (C) Team captain
- (S) Suspended
- (I) Ineligible
- (W) Walk-on
- (FW) Former walk-on
- (2G) Second-year graduate student
- Injured
- Current redshirt

Roster
Last update: November 28, 2025

=== Current depth chart ===
As of November 22, 2025

Pos.	Starting 5	Bench 1	Bench 2	Inactive
PG	Jakob Blakley	Eli Greenberg	Josiah Lee	Ametri Moss
SG	Jakai Sanders	Sam Donnelly
G/F	Trent Mosquera	Samuel Hincapie	Kaelin Thomas
F	Deng Garang	Tennessee Rainwater		Nate Fouts
F/C	Shilo Jackson	Trevor Roe	Isaac Nyakundi

== Schedule and results ==
Date time, TV	Rank^{#}	Opponent^{#}	Result	Record	High points	High rebounds	High assists	Site (attendance) city, state
Non-conference regular season
November 3, 2025*; 7:00 p.m., NECFR		SUNY Cobleskill	W 94–50	1–0	16 – Garang	6 – Roe	4 – Moss	Ted Grant Court (394); DeWitt, NY
November 6, 2025*; 7:00 p.m., ESPN+		at Xavier	L 69–74	1–1	20 – Mosquera	7 – Moss	6 – Jackson	Cintas Center (9,480); Cincinnati, OH
November 9, 2025*; 2:00 p.m., ESPN+		at Bowling Green	L 60–83	1–2	23 – Jackson	15 – Jackson	2 – 3 tied	Stroh Center (1,944); Bowling Green, OH
November 13, 2025*; 7:00 p.m., ESPN+		at UMass	L 80–94	1–3	17 – Sanders	6 – 2 tied	5 – 2 tied	Mullins Center (2,003); Amherst, MA
November 17, 2025*; 7:00 p.m., NECFR		Niagara	W 74–68	2–3	17 – 2 tied	11 – Jackson	6 – Sanders	Ted Grant Court (1,048); DeWitt, NY
November 22, 2025*; 1:00 p.m., NECFR		Fairfield	L 83–97	2–4	18 – 2 tied	9 – Jackson	4 – 2 tied	Ted Grant Court (565); DeWitt, NY
November 28, 2025*; 4:30 p.m., ESPN+		at Lafayette; Lafayette Classic	W 76–63	3–4	21 – Jackson	15 – Jackson	6 – Sanders	Kirby Sports Center (1,067); Easton, PA
November 29, 2025*; 2:00 p.m., ESPN+		vs. Monmouth; Lafayette Classic	W 83–79	4–4	23 – Sanders	11 – Jackson	7 – Sanders	Kirby Sports Center (506); Easton, PA
November 30, 2025*; 12:00 noon, ESPN+		vs. Ball State; Lafayette Classic	L 85–96	4–5	26 – Mosquera	9 – Jackson	4 – Mosquera	Kirby Sports Center (347); Easton, PA
December 6, 2025*; 4:00 p.m., SNY, ESPN+		at Binghamton; Battle of the Interstate	W 78–63	5–5	21 – Mosquera	10 – Jackson	4 – Mosquera	Dr. Bai Lee Court (1,752); Vestal, NY
December 16, 2025*; 8:00 p.m., SECN+		at Texas	L 53–95	5–6	14 – Mosquera	8 – Mosquera	2 – Mosquera	Moody Center (10,532); Austin, TX
December 20, 2025*; 1:00 p.m., ESPN+		at St. Bonaventure	L 81–92	5–7	25 – Jackson	8 – Garang	16 – Sanders	Reilly Center (3,638); St. Bonaventure, NY
December 28, 2025*; 2:00 p.m., ACCNX		at Boston College	L 64–72	5–8	19 – Jackson	15 – Jackson	3 – 2 tied	Conte Forum (4,768); Chestnut Hill, MA
NEC regular season
January 2, 2026; 7:00 p.m., NECFR		at Saint Francis	W 84–58	6–8 (1–0)	18 – Hincapie	8 – Jackson	4 – 2 tied	DeGol Arena (375); Loretto, PA
January 4, 2026; 2:00 p.m., NECFR		at Mercyhurst	L 60–74	6–9 (1–1)	17 – Jackson	9 – Rainwater	3 – Rainwater	Owen McCormick Court (150); Erie, PA
January 8, 2026; 7:00 p.m., NECFR		New Haven	W 73–47	7–9 (2–1)	18 – Garang	8 – Mosquera	4 – 2 tied	Ted Grant Court (273); DeWitt, NY
January 10, 2026; 1:00 p.m., NECFR		Central Connecticut	L 59–69	7–10 (2–2)	13 – Jackson	10 – Jackson	4 – Jackson	Ted Grant Court (369); DeWitt, NY
January 17, 2026; 2:00 p.m., NECFR		at Chicago State	W 72–57	8–10 (3–2)	17 – Rainwater	9 – Mosquera	4 – Rainwater	Jones Convocation Center (119); Chicago, IL
January 19, 2026; 3:00 p.m., NECFR		LIU	W 83–77	9–10 (4–2)	21 – Jackson	7 – Jackson	5 – Sanders	Ted Grant Court (587); DeWitt, NY
January 23, 2026; 7:00 p.m., NECFR		Wagner	W 69–67	10–10 (5–2)	25 – Rainwater	10 – Rainwater	5 – Sanders	Ted Grant Court (597); DeWitt, NY
January 26, 2026; 6:00 p.m., YES, NECFR		at Fairleigh Dickinson; Rescheduled from Jan. 25	W 87–74	11–10 (6–2)	18 – Mosquera	6 – Tied	4 – Sanders	Bogota Savings Bank Center (250); Hackensack, NJ
January 29, 2026; 7:00 p.m., NECFR		at LIU	L 61–83	11–11 (6–3)	16 – Rainwater	6 – Blakley	5 – Sanders	Steinberg Wellness Center (433); Brooklyn, NY
January 31, 2026; 1:00 p.m., NECFR		Stonehill	L 54–65	11–12 (6–4)	17 – Mosquera	10 – Mosquera	6 – Sanders	Ted Grant Court (445); DeWitt, NY
February 5, 2026; 7:00 p.m., NECFR		at Wagner	L 78–79	11–13 (6–5)	20 – Mosquera	5 – Tied	6 – Sanders	Spiro Sports Center (728); Staten Island, NY
February 7, 2026; 1:00 p.m., NECFR		Saint Francis	W 86–84	12–13 (7–5)	20 – Sanders	9 – Jackson	9 – Sanders	Ted Grant Court (586); DeWitt, NY
February 12, 2026; 7:00 p.m., NECFR		Mercyhurst	W 58–57	13–13 (8–5)	28 – Jackson	10 – Mosquera	4 – Greenberg	Ted Grant Court (578); DeWitt, NY
February 14, 2026; 1:00 p.m., NECFR		Chicago State	W 81–63	14–13 (9–5)	21 – Garang	7 – 2 tied	7 – Rainwater	Ted Grant Court (586); DeWitt, NY
February 19, 2026; 7:00 p.m., NECFR		at Central Connecticut	L 77–78	14–14 (9–6)	28 – Mosquera	9 – Garang	4 – Mosquera	William H. Detrick Gymnasium (904); New Britain, CT
February 21, 2026; 2:00 pm, NECFR		at Stonehill	L 68–77	14–15 (9–7)	20 – Garang	8 – Garang	3 – Mosquera	Merkert Gymnasium (485); Easton, MA
February 26, 2026; 7:00 p.m., NECFR		Fairleigh Dickinson	W 76–59	15–15 (10–7)	17 – Mosquera	13 – Garang	5 – Sanders	Ted Grant Court (476); DeWitt, NY
February 28, 2026; 1:00 p.m., NECFR		at New Haven	L 59–66	15–16 (10–8)	24 – Jackson	9 – Jackson	3 – Tied	Jeffrey P. Hazell Athletics Center (950); West Haven, CT
NEC tournament
March 4, 2026; 7:00 p.m., NECFR	(4)	(5) Stonehill; Quarterfinals	L 71–81	15–17	15 – Rainwater	10 – Tied	30 – Sanders	Ted Grant Court (781); DeWitt, NY
*Non-conference game. ^{#}Rankings from AP poll. (#) Tournament seedings in parentheses. All times are in Eastern.

== Media coverage ==
Every Dolphins game will be broadcast live on Fox Sports Radio affiliates WOLF at 1490 AM and 92.5 FM in Syracuse and WOSW at 1300 AM and 92.5 FM in Oswego County. Le Moyne alumni Chris Granozio and Don Familo will call their 33rd season of Dolphins basketball with Granozio handling the play-by-play and Familo providing the analysis and color. The Dolphins' radio network will also carry an hour-long weekly show called Dinner with the Dolphins on Tuesdays at 7 p.m. during the season. Dolphins head coach Nate Champion and the Le Moyne women's basketball head coach, Nick DiPillo, will be interviewed during each episode. The show will be broadcast live from Tully's Good Times on Erie Boulevard in Syracuse, and those in attendance can submit questions for the coaches.

Dolphins road games versus conference opponents and all their home games will be streamed live and available for free on NEC Front Row, the Northeast Conference's streaming platform. The radio feed with Granozio and Familo on the call will be heard on Dolphins home games that stream on NEC Front Row. Television or streaming coverage of non-conference road and neutral-site games will be available on the media outlets with which the host team has made arrangements.
