= List of Le Moyne Dolphins men's basketball head coaches =

List of college basketball team head coaches

The Le Moyne Dolphins men's basketball team plays at the Division I level of the National Collegiate Athletic Association (NCAA) in the Northeast Conference (NEC). The Dolphins originally did not play within any athletic conference.

In 1950, Le Moyne became a charter member of the Eastern Catholic Intercollegiate Athletic Conference. After only one season, the ECIAC ceased publicizing itself as a conference and became an association of its member schools with no champion crowned, leaving Le Moyne an independent again for 1951–52.

In 1955, Le Moyne became a charter member of the new Middle Eastern College Athletic Association (MECAA). The MECAA included teams that were also members of other conferences, a practice not uncommon at the time. When the NCAA split its members into the College Division and University Division in 1956, the MECAA included four teams (St. Francis Brooklyn, Iona, St. Bonaventure and Siena) that were placed into the University Division, while Le Moyne and Saint Peter's were placed into the College Division. St. Francis was also a member of the Metropolitan New York Conference, and St. Bonaventure was also a member of the Western New York Little Three Conference. Nevertheless, all six schools initially continued their affiliation with the MECAA, after the split. Le Moyne remained a member of the MECAA, until it was dissolved following the 1975–76 season. The MECAA awarded its championship based on regular-season winning percentage and did not conduct a post-season tournament. The Dolphins took the title six times during their 21 seasons of membership, the most championships of any member. Since conference membership crossed NCAA divisions, the MECAA champion was not awarded an automatic bid to any NCAA tournament. In December 1960, the MECAA conducted an in-season Christmas tournament that included five of its six teams as well as three non-members. Le Moyne defeated Saint Peter's, Iona and Long Island to win the tournament title.

Le Moyne became a Division II institution, when the College Division was split in 1973. Following the dissolution of the MECAA, the Dolphins played as an independent until joining the Mideast Collegiate Conference (MECC) in 1983, and remained a member of that conference, until it dissolved in 1991. After playing the 1991–92 season as an independent, Le Moyne joined the New England Collegiate Conference (NECC) in 1992. In 1996, the Dolphins joined the Northeast-10 Conference (NE10), where they remained until beginning reclassification to Division I as a member of the NEC in 2023. The Dolphins play their home games on Ted Grant Court in the Le Moyne Events Center.

There have been nine head coaches in the history of Le Moyne basketball. The program has played 1,949 games across 76 seasons from the program's inaugural 1948–49 campaign through the end of the 2024–25 season.

Tommy Niland had the longest tenure at Le Moyne, coaching for 25 seasons, and is the all-time leader in games coached (536) and wins at the school (326). Niland led the Dolphins to six NCAA tournament appearances, the most of any Le Moyne head coach.

The current head coach is Nate Champion, who played for the Dolphins from 2010 to 2014.

== Statistics ==
Key
#	Number of coaches
GC	Games coached
OW	Overall Wins
OL	Overall Losses
O%	Overall Winning Percentage
CW	Conference Wins
CL	Conference Losses
C%	Conference Winning Percentage
RCs	Regular Season Conference Champions
CCs	Conference Tournament Champions
D2s	NCAA Division II Tournament Appearances
CCOYs	Conference Coach of the Year Awards

Statistics are correct as of the conclusion of the 2024–25 college basketball season.

#	Name	Term	GC	OW	OL	O%	CW	CL	C%	RCs	CCs	D2s	CCOYs
1	Tommy Niland	1948–1973	534	324	210	.607	59	39	.602	7 (Note: 1959, 1960, 1962, 1964, 1965, 1969 and 1973 MECAA championships. Le Moyne finished tied with Iona in 1959, and lost the only head-to-head matchup, 58–54, at Iona on February 14, 1959. Nevertheless, the MECAA recognized both teams as co-champions. Le Moyne finished tied with Saint Peter's in 1969, and won the only head-to-head matchup at home on December 3, 1968. Nevertheless, the MECAA recognized both teams as co-champions.)	1 (Note: 1960 Middle Eastern College Athletic Association Christmas Tournament, which included all but one of the conference teams as well as three non-member guest teams.)	7 (Note: 1959, 1960, 1964, 1965, 1966, 1968 and 1969.)	5 (Note: 1959, 1960, 1962, 1964 and 1965 MECAA Coach of the Year. Also named 1960 Catholic Small College Coach of the Year.)
2	Tom Cooney	1973–1979	145	82	63	.569	5	10	.333	0	—	0	0
3	Mike Lee	1979–1983	101	34	67	.337	—	—	—	—	—	0	—
4	John Beilein	1983–1992	257	163	94	.634	44	35	.557	2 (Note: 1984 and 1988 MECC championships; 1988 title was shared with Gannon.)	1 (Note: 1988 MECC tournament)	1 (Note: 1988)	1 (Note: 1988 MECC Coach of the Year)
5	Scott Hicks	1992–1997	143	87	56	.608	50	34	.595	0	2 (Note: 1996 NECC and 1997 NE10 tournaments)	2 (Note: 1996 and 1997)	0
6	Dave Paulsen	1997–2000	81	42	39	.519	24	32	.429	0	0	0	0
7	Steve Evans	2000–2015	421	210	211	.499	151	175	.463	0	0	1 (Note: 2014)	0
8	Patrick Beilein	2015–2019	118	77	41	.653	55	25	.688	2 (Note: 2017 and 2018 NE10 Southwest Division championship and best overall conference record' Also won 2019 NE10 Southwest Division championship)	1 (Note: 2018 NE10 tournament)	3 (Note: 2017, 2018 and 2019)	2 (Note: 2017 and 2018 NE10 Coach of the Year)
9	Nate Champion	2019–present	149	70	79	.470	47	43	.522	1 (Note: 2020 NE10 Southwest Division championship and best overall conference record)	0	0	1 (Note: 2020 NE10 Coach of the Year)
Totals			1,949	1,089	860	.559	435	393	.525	12	5	14	9
