= Jamie Young (basketball) =

American basketball coach (born 1980)

Current position
- Title: Assistant coach
- Team: Le Moyne
- Conference: Northeast Conference

Biographical details
- Born: June 14, 1980 (age 46); Logansport, Indiana, U.S.
- Education: Blackburn College (Illinois)

Coaching career (HC unless noted)
- 1998–2000: Greenville College (assistant)
- 2000–2001: New Jersey Nets (assistant video coordinator)
- 2001–2007: Boston Celtics (video coordinator)
- 2007–2011: Boston Celtics (advance scout)
- 2011–2021: Boston Celtics (assistant)
- 2021–2023: Philadelphia 76ers (assistant)
- 2023–2024: Le Moyne (assistant)
- 2024–2025: Villanova (assistant)
- 2025–present: Le Moyne (assistant)

Jamie Young (born June 14, 1980) is an American basketball coach who is currently an assistant coach at Le Moyne College. He previously coached at the collegiate and professional levels.

== Coaching career ==
=== Boston Celtics ===
Young was with the Boston Celtics franchise from 2000 until 2021. He served as a video coordinator (2000–2007) and advance scout (2007–2011) for the Celtics before being hired as an assistant coach in 2011. Former Celtics head coach Doc Rivers praised Young for his "incredible work ethic" and "great basketball mind".

=== Philadelphia 76ers ===
In August 2021, the Philadelphia 76ers hired Young as an assistant coach.

=== Collegiate coaching ===
In October 2023, Young joined the staff of the Le Moyne Dolphins men's basketball team. Following a season on the coaching staff at Villanova University, he returned to Le Moyne in 2025.

== Personal life ==
Young is from Indiana. He graduated from Blackburn College in 1998, earning a bachelor's degree in physical education.
