= Nate Champion (basketball) =

American basketball player and coach (born 1991)

Le Moyne Dolphins
- Title: Head coach
- Conference: Northeast Conference

Personal information
- Born: December 1, 1991 (age 34) Logansport, Indiana, U.S.
- Listed height: 6 ft 3 in (1.91 m)
- Listed weight: 190 lb (86 kg)

Career information
- High school: Logansport (Logansport, Indiana)
- College: Le Moyne (2010–2014)
- Playing career: 2015–2016
- Position: Guard
- Number: 5
- Coaching career: 2014, 2016–present

Career history

Playing
- 2015–2016: Ringwood Hawks

Coaching
- 2014: Le Moyne (graduate assistant)
- 2016–2017: Stonehill (volunteer assistant)
- 2017–2019: Florida Southern (assistant)
- 2019–present: Le Moyne

Career highlights
- NE-10 Southwest Division (2020); NE-10 Coach of the Year (2020)

Nathan Champion (born December 1, 1991) is an American college basketball coach and former player who is currently the head coach of the Le Moyne Dolphins men's basketball team, a role he has held since 2019. In his first season as head coach, he was named the Northeast-10 Conference's Coach of the Year as well as the National Association of Basketball Coaches's 30-under-30 team.

== Head coaching record ==
Record table
| Season | Team | Overall | Conference | Standing | Postseason |
|---|---|---|---|---|---|
Le Moyne Dolphins (Northeast-10 Conference) (2019–2023)
| 2019–20 | Le Moyne | 19–9 | 15–4 | 1st (Southwest) | |
| 2021–22 | Le Moyne | 12–15 | 8–11 | 5th (Southwest) | |
| 2022–23 | Le Moyne | 15–15 | 11–9 | T–5th | |
Le Moyne Dolphins (Northeast Conference) (2023–present)
| 2023–24 | Le Moyne | 15–17 | 9–7 | T–4th | |
| 2024–25 | Le Moyne | 9–23 | 4–12 | T–8th | |
| 2025–26 | Le Moyne | 15–17 | 10–8 | T–3rd | |
| 2026–27 | Le Moyne | 2–4 | 0–0 | | |
| Le Moyne: | | 87–100 (.465) | 57–51 (.528) | | |
| Total: | | 87–100 (.465) | | | |
National champion Postseason invitational champion Conference regular season champion Conference regular season and conference tournament champion Division regular season champion Division regular season and conference tournament champion Conference tournament champion
