= Pomeroy College Basketball Ratings =

Ratings for American men's college basketball

The logo of kenpom.com, the website that hosts the ratings

The Pomeroy College Basketball Ratings are a series of predictive ratings of men's college basketball teams published free-of-charge online by Ken Pomeroy. They were first published in 2003.

The sports rating system is based on the Pythagorean expectation, though it has some adjustments. Variations on the Pythagorean expectation are also used in basketball by noted statisticians Dean Oliver and John Hollinger. According to The New York Times, as of 2011, the Pomeroy College Basketball Ratings have a 73% success rate, which is 2% better than the Ratings Percentage Index.

Pomeroy is routinely mentioned on, or interviewed for, sports blogs, including ESPN's 'College Basketball Nation Blog, SB Nation, Basketball Prospectus, The Topeka Capital-Journal, Mediaite and The Wall Street Journal's 'Daily Fix'. He has also been a contributing writer for ESPN's "Insider" feature. In addition, his rating system has been mentioned in newspapers and sites including the New York Daily News,
