= 2024–25 Merrimack Warriors men's basketball team =

American college basketball season

2024–25 Merrimack Warriors men's basketball
- Conference: Metro Atlantic Athletic Conference
- Record: 18–15 (14–6 MAAC)
- Head coach: Joe Gallo (9th season)
- Assistant coaches: Micky Burtnyk; Jimmy Langhurst; Juvaris Hayes; Chris Mohr
- Home arena: Hammel Court

2024–25 MAAC men's basketball standings
	Conf.				Overall
Team	W		L	PCT	W		L	PCT
Quinnipiac	15	–	5	.750	20	–	13	.606
Merrimack	14	–	6	.700	18	–	15	.545
Marist	13	–	7	.650	20	–	10	.667
Iona	12	–	8	.600	17	–	17	.500
Manhattan	12	–	8	.600	17	–	14	.548
Mount St. Mary's †	12	–	8	.600	23	–	13	.639
Sacred Heart	10	–	10	.500	15	–	18	.455
Rider	9	–	11	.450	14	–	19	.424
Siena	9	–	11	.450	14	–	18	.438
Fairfield	8	–	12	.400	12	–	20	.375
Saint Peter's	7	–	13	.350	12	–	16	.429
Niagara	6	–	14	.300	11	–	20	.355
Canisius	3	–	17	.150	3	–	28	.097
† 2025 MAAC tournament winner

The 2024–25 Merrimack Warriors men's basketball team represented Merrimack College during the 2024–25 NCAA Division I men's basketball season. The Warriors, led by ninth-year head coach Joe Gallo, played their home games at Hammel Court, with some games at Lawler Arena, located in North Andover, Massachusetts as first-year members of the Metro Atlantic Athletic Conference.

== Previous season ==
The Warriors finished the 2023–24 season 21–12, 13–3 in NEC play to finish as NEC regular-season co-champions, alongside Central Connecticut. They defeated LIU and Le Moyne, before falling to Wagner in the NEC tournament championship game.

This would be the first season for Merrimack as members of the Metro Atlantic Athletic Conference for the 2024–25 season.

== Roster ==
2024–25 Merrimack Warriors men's basketball team
Players
Coaches

Pos.	#	Name	Height	Weight	Year	Previous school	Hometown
G	0	Adam "Budd" Clark	5 ft 10 in (1.78 m)	155 lb (70 kg)	So	West Catholic High School	Philadelphia, PA
G	1	Jaylen Stinson	6 ft 2 in (1.88 m)	170 lb (77 kg)	Sr	James Madison	Philadelphia, PA
F	2	Christian Foy	6 ft 6 in (1.98 m)	210 lb (95 kg)	RS Fr	North Mecklenburg High School	Huntersville, NC
G	3	Matt Becht	6 ft 4 in (1.93 m)	185 lb (84 kg)	GS	Southern New Hampshire	Vienna, VA
G	4	Tye Dorset	6 ft 3 in (1.91 m)	175 lb (79 kg)	Fr	Lenape High School	Mount Laurel, NJ
G	5	Devon Savage	6 ft 4 in (1.93 m)	190 lb (86 kg)	Sr	James Madison	Washington, D.C.
G	9	Malik Edmead	5 ft 10 in (1.78 m)	165 lb (75 kg)	RS Jr	Albany	Deer Park, NY
F	10	Elliott Black	6 ft 7 in (2.01 m)	220 lb (100 kg)	Jr	St. Stephen's & St. Agnes School	Washington, D.C.
F	11	Bryan Etumnu	6 ft 7 in (2.01 m)	215 lb (98 kg)	Jr	Kempner High School	Sugar Land, TX
G	12	Thomas Hall	6 ft 4 in (1.93 m)	195 lb (88 kg)	Sr	Albertus Magnus	Nanuet, NY
F	13	Edrick Quezada	6 ft 5 in (1.96 m)	210 lb (95 kg)	So	Brimmer and May School	Rockland, MA
F	14	Brandon Legris	6 ft 7 in (2.01 m)	210 lb (95 kg)	Jr	Perkiomen School	Hatfield, PA
F	15	David Murray	6 ft 7 in (2.01 m)	245 lb (111 kg)	GS	Connecticut College	Jackson Heights, NY
G	21	Brendan Johnson	6 ft 4 in (1.93 m)	205 lb (93 kg)	Fr	Calvert Hall High School	Pikesville, MD
G	25	Liam Price	6 ft 0 in (1.83 m)	155 lb (70 kg)	Fr	Kimball Union Academy	Brookline Village, MA
F	40	Sean Trumper	6 ft 7 in (2.01 m)	215 lb (98 kg)	GS	Franklin Pierce	Ashford, England
G	41	Armandas Plintauskas	6 ft 4 in (1.93 m)	185 lb (84 kg)	Jr	Northern Illinois	Kėdainiai, Lithuania

Head coach

- Joe Gallo (Merrimack)

Assistant coach(es)

- Micky Burtnyk (Merrimack)
- Jimmy Langhurst (Robert Morris)
- Juvaris Hayes (Merrimack)
- Chris Mohr (Merrimack)

Legend

- (C) Team captain
- (S) Suspended
- (I) Ineligible
- (W) Walk-on
- Injured
- Current redshirt

Roster
Last update: November 9, 2024

== Schedule and results ==
Date time, TV	Rank^{#}	Opponent^{#}	Result	Record	Site (attendance) city, state
Regular season
November 9, 2024*; 7:00 pm, ESPN+		Vermont	W 65–51	1–0	Lawler Arena (1,747); North Andover, MA
November 13, 2024*; 7:00 pm, ESPN+		at VCU	L 42–63	1–1	Siegel Center (7,183); Richmond, VA
November 17, 2024*; 1:00 pm, ESPN+		Princeton	L 57–68	1–2	Lawler Arena (1,824); North Andover, MA
November 20, 2024*; 8:00 pm, Peacock		at No. 24 Rutgers	L 63–74	1–3	Jersey Mike's Arena (8,000); Piscataway, NJ
November 22, 2024*; 7:00 pm, FS2		at Butler	L 39–78	1–4	Hinkle Fieldhouse (6,823); Indianapolis, IN
November 25, 2024*; 6:00 pm, ESPN+		at UMass Lowell	L 74–81	1–5	Costello Athletic Center (578); Lowell, MA
November 27, 2024*; 6:00 pm, ESPN+		vs. UTSA; Trojan Turkey Tipoff	L 74–76	1–6	Trojan Arena (121); Troy, AL
November 29, 2024*; 1:00 pm, ESPN+		at Troy; Trojan Turkey Tipoff	W 72–68	2–6	Trojan Arena (2,263); Troy, AL
December 6, 2024; 7:00 pm, ESPN+		at Canisius	W 60–52	3–6 (1–0)	Koessler Athletic Center (755); Buffalo, NY
December 8, 2024; 1:00 pm, ESPN+		at Niagara	W 80–62	4–6 (2–0)	Gallagher Center (860); Lewiston, NY
December 13, 2024*; 7:00 pm, ESPN+		Boston University	W 64–61	5–6	Lawler Arena (1,327); North Andover, MA
December 17, 2024*; 10:00 pm, ACCNX/ESPN+		at Stanford	L 68–74	5–7	Maples Pavilion (2,121); Stanford, CA
December 19, 2024*; 10:00 pm, ESPN+		at Saint Mary's	L 68–73	5–8	University Credit Union Pavilion (3,255); Moraga, CA
January 3, 2025; 3:00 pm, ESPN+		Fairfield	W 67–54	6–8 (3–0)	Lawler Arena (943); North Andover, MA
January 10, 2025; 11:00 am, ESPN+		at Sacred Heart	W 66–65	7–8 (4–0)	William H. Pitt Center (1,200); Fairfield, CT
January 12, 2025; 2:00 pm, ESPN+		Manhattan	W 69–62	8–8 (5–0)	Hammel Court (717); North Andover, MA
January 16, 2025; 7:00 pm, ESPN+		at Quinnipiac	L 76–81	8–9 (5–1)	M&T Bank Arena (932); Hamden, CT
January 18, 2025; 3:00 pm, ESPN+		Siena	W 64–58	9–9 (6–1)	Hammel Court (1,533); North Andover, MA
January 23, 2025; 7:00 pm, ESPN+		at Saint Peter's	W 48–37	10–9 (7–1)	Run Baby Run Arena (621); Jersey City, NJ
January 25, 2025; 7:00 pm, ESPN+		at Fairfield	W 75–54	11–9 (8–1)	Leo D. Mahoney Arena (2,278); Fairfield, CT
January 31, 2025; 7:00 pm, ESPN+		Mount St. Mary's	L 58–66	11–10 (8–2)	Hammel Court (1,712); North Andover, MA
February 2, 2025; 4:00 pm, ESPN+		at Rider	W 66–64	12–10 (9–2)	Alumni Gymnasium (1,650); Lawrenceville, NJ
February 6, 2025; 7:00 pm, ESPN+		Niagara	W 64–59	13–10 (10–2)	Hammel Court (1,867); North Andover, MA
February 8, 2025; 3:00 pm, ESPN+		Canisius	W 69–51	14–10 (11–2)	Hammel Court (1,186); North Andover, MA
February 14, 2025; 7:00 pm, ESPN+		at Manhattan	L 75–79	14–11 (11–3)	Draddy Gymnasium (573); Riverdale, NY
February 16, 2025; 2:00 pm, ESPN+		Marist	L 60–61	14–12 (11–4)	Hammel Court (1,576); North Andover, MA
February 21, 2025; 7:00 pm, ESPN+		Sacred Heart	L 59–60	14–13 (11–5)	Hammel Court (1,417); North Andover, MA
February 23, 2025; 1:00 pm, ESPN+		at Iona	W 77–70 ^{OT}	15–13 (12–5)	Hynes Athletics Center (1,418); New Rochelle, NY
February 28, 2025; 7:00 pm, ESPN+		Rider	L 78–83	15–14 (12–6)	Hammel Court (1,372); North Andover, MA
March 2, 2025; 2:00 pm, ESPN+		Quinnipiac	W 83–73	16–14 (13–6)	Hammel Court (1,783); North Andover, MA
March 6, 2025; 7:00 pm, ESPN+		at Marist	W 75–53	17–14 (14–6)	McCann Arena (1,575); Poughkeepsie, NY
MAAC tournament
March 12, 2025; 8:30 pm, ESPN+	(2)	vs. (7) Sacred Heart; Quarterfinals	W 66–62 ^{OT}	18–14	Boardwalk Hall (1,707); Atlantic City, NJ
March 14, 2025; 8:30 pm, ESPNews	(2)	vs. (6) Mount St. Mary's; Semifinals	L 55–57	18–15	Boardwalk Hall (2,247); Atlantic City, NJ
*Non-conference game. ^{#}Rankings from AP Poll. (#) Tournament seedings in parentheses. All times are in Eastern.
