= Merrimack Warriors men's basketball =

NCAA Division 1 program

2026–27 Merrimack Warriors men's basketball team
- University: Merrimack College
- Head coach: Joe Gallo (11th season)
- Location: North Andover, Massachusetts
- Arena: Merrimack Athletics Complex (capacity: 1,200)
- Conference: Metro Atlantic Athletic Conference
- Nickname: Warriors
- Colors: Blue and gold

NCAA Division I tournament Sweet Sixteen
- 1977*, 1978*

NCAA Division I tournament appearances
- 1977*, 1978*, 1991*, 1992*, 2000*, 2008*, 2009*, 2010*, 2017*, 2018*, 2019*

Conference tournament champions
- NE-10: 1992, 2000, 2019 NEC: 2023

Conference regular-season champions
- NE-10: 2000 NEC: 2020, 2023, 2024 MAAC: 2026

ECAC Division II tournament champions
- 1989, 1998, 1999
- * at Division II level

The Merrimack Warriors men's basketball team represents Merrimack College in North Andover, Massachusetts, United States. The school's team currently competes in the Metro Atlantic Athletic Conference. They are currently led by 9th year head coach Joe Gallo and play their home games in Hammel Court and Lawler Arena at the Merrimack Athletics Complex.

The Warriors played their first season in 1949 at the D2 level. In 1984 they joined the Northeast 10 conference. They would stay there from 1984 to 2019 and win three conference championships and one regular season title. They would also make 11 NCAA D2 tournament appearances. Making it to the sweet 16 in 1976 and 1977. They would also win 3 ECAC tournament titles during this period.

In their first year at the Division 1 level, the 2019–20 team went 14–4 in NEC play and won the regular season title, despite in the preseason being picked by the media to finish 11th out of 11 teams. Due to the NCAA's policy on reclassifying programs, the Warriors were not eligible to compete in the NCAA tournament or the NIT until the 2023–24 season. The Warriors have never appeared in the NCAA Division I men's basketball tournament. In 2024, the Warriors joined the Metro Atlantic Athletic Conference, leaving the NEC.

== History ==
The Merrimack basketball program started in 1949 they would play as a D2 independent. Paul Lanni was hired as their first ever head coach and led them to a 7–2 record in their first season. Lanni would leave after just one season. From 1950 to 1958 the Warriors would go through three coaching changes. In 1958 they would hire William S. LaRochelle who would lead the team for the next decade in his 12 seasons LaRochelle would lead the warriors to nine winning seasons. With his best season coming in 1966-67 when he led the warriors to a 17–6 record. Roger Damphousse would be the first player in program history to be named an all American in 1961. LaRochelle would leave after the 1969–70 season being the first ever warrior coach to get to the 100 win mark ending with an overall record of 153–114.

=== The Monahan era ===
After LaRochelle left in 1970 then at the time Merrimack Athletic director Frank T. Monahan would take over as head coach. Monahan's first five seasons would be very up and down going 55-71 during this time. Steve McMahon would be the first ever warrior to be drafted to the NBA in 1972. During the 1975–76 season Monahan and the warriors took a big step forward as he led them to their first 20 win season in program history. They would keep this momentum going into next season. As he led the warriors to a 19–9 record this resulted in their first ever NCAA Division II tournament birth in program history. The warriors would make it to the sweet sixteen that year beating Bridgeport in the first round 107–83. They would eventually fall to Sacred Heart 110–104 in the sweet 16. After leading the warriors to one of the best seasons in program history. Monahan would one up this the following season in 1977–78 by leading the warriors to a program high 22–6 record and getting them back into the NCAA Division II tournament. The warriors would also be ranked as high as #2 in the nation during this season. On top of this star player Ed Murphy led NCAA in scoring this year and Coach Monahan would be named the New England coach of the year. Once again the Warriors would win their first round match up dominating Bryant Bulldogs 116–91. But for the second year in a row the Warriors would meet Sacred heart in the sweet sixteen and would once again lose 84–83. These two seasons would be the furthest Merrimack ever made it in the D2 tournament. Monahan would coach another two seasons before eventually resigning in 1980.

=== The Hammel era ===
Frank Monahan's assistant Bert Hammel took over the head coaching position after he left in 1980, and Hammel was here for the long haul as he would stay as Merrimack head coach from 1980 all the way till 2016. Hammel led the warriors to a some success in his first 4 years. But big changes came in 1984 when for the first time in program history the warriors joined a conference that being the Northeast 10. In just their second year in the conference during the 1985–86 season. The warriors would go 19–9 overall and 9–5 in their conference, finishing in 2nd place. They would then beat Assumption in the quarterfinals 83–78. They would then meet AIC in the semifinals, beating them 107–92. Punching their ticket to their first appearance in the NE10 Championship game. They would eventually fall to Springfield 70–65. Even with the loss it was still a great year for the program showing they could hold their own in their new conference. During the 1988–89 season, the Warriors compiled a 22–9 record and were invited to the ECAC metro tournament. The warriors would go on to beat New York tech in the semifinals 102-78 and would beat Long Island-C.W. Post 98–85 to win their first championship in program history. Hammel would lead the Warriors to their 3rd NCAA tournament appearance in 1991 with a 21–9 record. Hammel would be named NE10 coach of the year and Paul Neal would be named NE10 MVP. But the Warriors would lose in the first round of the NCAA tournament to Franklin Pierce 82–79. The Warriors would have a historic season the following year in 1992 going 22-9 and beating Saint Anslem 92–77 to win their first NE10 championship in program history and making it to back-to-back NCAA tournaments. In the 1992 NCAA tournament the warriors would lose in the first round to Bridgeport 91–84. After a couple of mediocre seasons, the Warriors would hit a nice stretch in the late 90s going into the 2000s. As they would win back to back ECAC metro championships in 1998 and 1999 beating St Michaels 80-75 for the title in 1998 and beating NJIT 96-82 for the title 1999. The following year they would go 22-9 and win both the NE10 regular season and tournament championships, beating AIC 84–78. Punching their 5 ticket to the 2000 NCAA tournament the warriors would beat Saint rose 92–64 in the first round before losing in the round of 32 to Adelphi 90–64. After some unsuccessful seasons, two Warriors players would win NE10 rookies of the year: Darren Duncan 2007 and Darin Mency in 2008. Hammel would lead the warriors to three straight NCAA tournament appearances in 2008, 2009 and 2010. In 2008, they would lose in the first round to Bentley 81–61. In 2009, they would beat Umass Lowell in the first round 86–84 before getting eliminated by Bentley again in the round of 32 79–76. Hammel's final run in the tournament in 2010 would look awfully similar to the year prior, as they would beat Umass Lowell 81–62 in the first round before getting eliminated by Bentley for the third year in a row, losing 83–79. Hammel would coach for another 6 seasons after the 2010 season before retiring in 2016 finishing with a record of 526-491 setting the all-time wins record for the warriors.

=== The Gallo era ===
In 2016, Gallo was hired as head coach at his alma mater, replacing Bert Hammel. Gallo led the program to immediate success. In his first 3 seasons he led the warriors to the NCAA division II tournament 3 years in a row in 2017 2018 and 2019. The warriors would make it to the round of 32 in 2017 and 2018. Gallo would also lead the program to their first NE10 title in 19 years during the 2018–19 season beating New Haven 51-46 for the title. 2019 would be the warriors last ever appearance in the NCAA D2 tournament and they would lose to Dominican (NY) 64–50 in the first round. They would finish with 11 total appearances. After 35 years in the NE10 In 2019 The warriors jumped to division I. Moving to the NEC In just their second game at the DI level the warriors would shock the world by beating big ten opponent Northwestern 72-62 for their first ever D1 victory. From here In just their first season in Division I Gallo would go on to lead Merrimack to a 20–11 overall record and a 14–4 conference record and a Northeast Conference regular season title in 2020, Gallo was named conference coach of the year along with getting a plethora of other coaching awards. Juvaris Hayes was named the Lefty Driesell Award winner and would be the first player in team history to be named a D1 all American. Capping off a historic season. During the 2022–23 season the warriors would start out 2–13 overall. But they would only lose 3 more games after that finishing the regular season 15–16 overall and 12–4 in conference winning another regular season titles in 2023. For the first time the warriors were allowed to compete in the NEC tournament. As the 1 seed the warriors would beat LIU and Sacred heart to advance to the championship game. The Warriors would play FDU in the title game and win a nail biter 67–66 to win their first and only NEC tournament. But the warriors could not go to the NCAA division I tournament due to NCAA transitional rule. Jordan Minor would be named NEC player of the year and the warriors would end the that season on an 11-game win streak which was longest by any team in the country that season. The warriors would go 21-12 and 13–3 in conference the next season in 2023-24 and win their third NEC regular season title in just 5 years. The warriors would also sweep the NEC awards this year as Adam Clark won NEC rookie of the year, Brian Etumnu would be named most improved player and Jordan Derkack would be named defensive of the year and conference MVP. Gallo and the warriors would also get back to the NEC championship game in 2024 now eligible for the tournament but would fall to Wagner 54–47. This would be the warriors last season in NEC. The warriors would end their time in the NEC with an overall record of 82-64 and a dominant conference record 58-28 they never had a losing record in NEC conference play. In 2024 Gallo and the warriors would move to the MAAC Conference. They would finish in second place in their first year going 18–15 overall and 14–6 in conference before losing to Mount Saint Mary's in the MAAC semifinals 57–55. During the 2025–26 season the Warriors won a program best 23 games and claimed their first MAAC regular season championship. Freshman Kevair Kennedy also became the first player to win both the MAAC Rookie and Player of the year awards. They reached the 2026 MAAC men's basketball tournament final however they were defeated by Siena.

== Season-by-season record ==
Year	Coach	Overall Record		Conference record		Conference champs/standings	Postseason
		W	L	W	L		
1949-50	Paul Lanni	7	2				
1950-51	Larry Cicero	8	9				
1951-52	Larry Cicero	8	11				
1952-53	Larry Cicero	8	10				
1953-54	Irman Pierce	4	15				
1954-55	Kevin Harrington	8	15				
1955-56	Kevin Harrington	9	15				
1956-57	Kevin Harrington	8	18				
1957-58	Kevin Harrington	4	16				
1958-59	William S. LaRochelle	12	11				
1959-60	William S. LaRochelle	11	11				
1960-61	William S. LaRochelle	15	11				
1961-62	William S. LaRochelle	12	9				
1962-63	William S. LaRochelle	14	9				
1963-64	William S. LaRochelle	13	7				
1964-65	William S. LaRochelle	14	6				
1965-66	William S. LaRochelle	7	15				
1966-67	William S. LaRochelle	17	6				
1967-68	William S. LaRochelle	14	11				
1968-69	William S. LaRochelle	11	11				
1969-70	William S. LaRochelle	12	10				
1970-71	Frank T. Monahan	11	13				
1971-72	Frank T. Monahan	16	8				
1972-73	Frank T. Monahan	8	18				
1973-74	Frank T. Monahan	9	17				
1974-75	Frank T. Monahan	11	15				
1975-76	Frank T. Monahan	21	8				
1976-77	Frank T. Monahan	19	9				NCAA Sweet 16 (W Bridgeport 107–83) L Sacred Heart 110–104)
1977-78	Frank T. Monahan	22	6				NCAA Sweet 16 (W Bryant 116–91) ( L Sacred Heart 84–83)
1978-79	Frank T. Monahan	3	24				
1979-80	Frank T. Monahan	9	18				
1980-81	Bert Hammel	12	15	10	10		
1981-82	Bert Hammel	17	10	13	5		
1982-83	Bert Hammel	13	14	8	11		
1983-84	Bert Hammel	14	13	10	11		
				NE10			
1984-85	Bert Hammel	11	17	3	11	6th place	NE10 Semifinal
1985-86	Bert Hammel	19	9	9	5	2nd place	NE10 Runner up
1986-87	Bert Hammel	13	16	7	7	3rd place	NE10 Semifinal
1987-88	Bert Hammel	9	19	4	14	9th place	NE10 First round
1988-89	Bert Hammel	22	9	13	5	3rd place	ECAC tournament champions (W New York tech 102–78) (W Long Island-C.W. Post 98–85)
1989-90	Bert Hammel	15	15	11	7	3rd place	NE10 Semifinals
1990-91	Bert Hammel	21	9	14	4	2nd place	NCAA Round of 32 ( L Franklin Pierce 82–79)
1991-92	Bert Hammel	18	14	9	9	6th place NE10Tournament champions	NCAA Round of 32 (L Bridgeport 91–84)
1992-93	Bert Hammel	11	16	7	11	8th place	NE10 Quarterfinals
1993-94	Bert Hammel	11	17	7	11	9th place	NE10 Quarterfinals
1994-95	Bert Hammel	14	13	9	9	6th place	NE10 Quarterfinals
1995-96	Bert Hammel	12	16	7	9	6th place	NE10 Semifinals
1996-97	Bert Hammel	11	15	6	12	8th place	
1997-98	Bert Hammel	16	13	9	11	7th place	ECAC tournament champions (W U Albany 92–82) (W St Michaels 80–75)
1998-99	Bert Hammel	22	7	12	6	4th place	ECAC tournament champions (W U Albany 76–62) (W NJIT 96–82)
1999-00	Bert Hammel	22	9	13	5	1st place NE10 regular champions NE10 tournament champions	NCAA Round of 32 ( W Saint Rose 92–64) ( L Adelphi90-64)
2000-01	Bert Hammel	13	15	12	11	9th place	NE10 Quarterfinals
2001-02	Bert Hammel	6	20	5	17	13th place	
2002-03	Bert Hammel	11	17	8	14	11th place	NE10 First round
2003-04	Bert Hammel	17	12	11	11	9th place	NE10 Quarterfinals
2004-05	Bert Hammel	14	15	9	13	10th place	NE10 Quarterfinals
2005-06	Bert Hammel	15	14	11	10	8th place	NE10 Quarterfinals
2006-07	Bert Hammel	8	20	7	15	12th place	NE10 First round
2007-08	Bert Hammel	17	12	11	11	6th place	NCAA round of 64 ( L Bentley 81–68)
2008-09	Bert Hammel	21	9	16	6	4th place	NCAA round of 32 ( W Umass Lowell 86–84) ( L Bentley 79–76)
2009-10	Bert Hammel	21	9	16	6	3rd place	NCAA round of 32 (W Umass Lowell 81–62) (L Bentley 83–79)
2010-11	Bert Hammel	13	14	9	13	10th place	NE10 First round
2011-12	Bert Hammel	15	12	12	10	5th place	NE10 Quarterfinals
2012-13	Bert Hammel	12	15	9	13	11th place	
2013-14	Bert Hammel	9	17	7	14	6th place	
2014-15	Bert Hammel	16	12	10	11	5th place	NE10 Quarterfinals
2015-16	Bert Hammel	15	12	10	11	7th place	
2016-17	Joe Gallo	19	12	12	9	3rd place	NCAA round of 32 (W Le Moyne 72–68) ( L St. Thomas Aquinas 73–70)
2017-18	Joe Gallo	20	12	14	7	2nd place	NCAA round of 32 (W Bridgeport 85–70) (L Bloomfield 109–91)
2018-19	Joe Gallo	22	10	14	7	2nd place NE10 tournament champions	NCAA round of 64(L Dominican (NY) 64–50)
				NEC			
2019-20	Joe Gallo	20	11	14	4	1st place NEC regular season champions	Could not compete due to NCAA transitional period
2020-21	Joe Gallo	9	9	9	9	4th place	Could not compete due to NCAA transitional period
2021-22	Joe Gallo	14	16	10	8	4th place	The Basketball Classic ( UMBC game cancelled)
2022-23	Joe Gallo	18	16	12	4	1st place NEC regular season and TournamentChampions	Could not compete due to NCAA transitional period
2023-24	Joe Gallo	21	12	13	3	1st place NEC regular season champions	NEC Runner up
				MAAC			
2024-25	Joe Gallo	18	15	14	6	2nd place	MAAC semifinals
2025-26	Joe Gallo	23	11	17	3	1st place MAAC regular season champions	MAAC Runner up
TOTALS		1056	980	473	422		

== Postseason ==
=== NCAA Division II tournament results ===
The Warriors appeared in the NCAA Division II Tournament eleven times they have a combined record of 7–11

Year	Round	Opponent	Result
1976	Round of 32 Sweet 16	Bridgeport Sacred Heart	W 107–83 L 110–104
1977	Round of 32 Sweet 16	Bryant Sacred heart	W 116–91 L 84–83
1991	Round of 32	Franklin Pierce	L 82–79
1992	Round of 32	Bridgeport	L 91–84
2000	Round of 64 Round of 32	Saint Rose Adelphi	W 92–84 L 90–64
2008	Round of 32	Bentley	L 81–64
2009	Round of 64 Round of 32	UMass Lowell Bentley	W 86–84 L 79–76
2010	Round of 64 Round of 32	UMass Lowell Bentley	W 81–61 L 83–79
2017	Round of 64 Round of 32	Le Moyne St. Thomas A	W 72–68 L 73–70
2018	Round of 64 Round of 32	Bridgeport Bloomfield	W 85–70 L 109–91
2019	Round of 32	Dominican (NY)	L 64–50

=== ECAC Metro tournament results ===
The warriors appeared in 3 ECAC Metro tournaments and won all 3

Year	Round	Opponent	Result
1989	Semi Final Final	New York Tech Long Island C.W post	W 102–78 W 99–85
1998	Semi Final Final	U Albany St Michael's	W 92–82 W 80–75
1999	Semi Final Final	U Albany NJIT	W 76–62 W 96–82

== Head coaches ==
Coach	Tenure	Record	Conf. Titles	Regular season titles	NCAA Apps.
Joe Gallo	2016-Pres	184-124	2	4	3
Bert Hammel	1980-2016	526-491	2	1	6
Frank T. Monahan	1970-80	128-134	0	0	2
William S. LaRochelle	1958-70	153-116	0	0	0
Kevin Harrington	1954-58	28-53	0	0	0
Irman Pierce	1953-54	4-15	0	0	0
Larry Cicero	1950-53	24-30	0	0	0
Paul Lanni	1949-50	7-2	0	0	0

== Player and coach awards ==
=== NCAA ===
NCAA Division II scoring leader

- Ed Murphy (1977 season)

=== Metro Atlantic Athletic Conference ===
MAAC player of the year

- Kevair Kennedy (2026)

MAAC Defensive players of the year

- Bryan Etumnu (2025)
- KC Ugwuakazi (2026)

MAAC Rookie of the year

- Kevair Kennedy (2026)

=== Northeast Conference ===
NEC player of the year

- Jordan Minor (2023)
- Jordan Derkack (2024)

NEC Defensive players of the year

- Juvaris Hayes (2020)
- Jordan Minor (2023)
- Jordan Derkack (2024)

NEC Rookie of the year

- Javon Bennett (2023)
- Adam “Budd” Clark (2024)

NEC Most improved player

- Bryan Etumnu (2024)

=== NE10 Awards ===
NE10 Player of the year

- Paul Neal (1991)

NE10 Defensive player of the year

- Reggie Carter (2000)
- Kenny Jones (2007)
- Juvaris Hayes (2019)

NE10 Rookie player of the year

- Steve Scott (1987)
- Darren Duncan (2007)
- Darin Mency (2008)
- Juvaris Hayes (2017)

NE10 Coach of the year

- Bert Hammel (1991)

=== Other awards ===
Lefty Driesell Award

- Juvaris Hayes (2020)

MAAC Coach of the year

- Joe Gallo (2026)

NEC Coach of the year

- Joe Gallo (2020)

John McLendon Award

- Joe Gallo (2020)

ECAC Coach of the Year

- Joe Gallo (2020)

NABC District Coach of the Year

- Joe Gallo (2020, 2023)

USBWA Coach of the Year

- Joe Gallo (2020)

HoopDirt.com NCAA Div. 1 Coach of the year

- Joe Gallo (2020)

New England UPI Division II coach of the year (1978)

- Frank T Monahan

=== All-Americans ===
- Roger Damphousse —1961, 1962
- Ed Murphy — 1976, 1977, 1978
- Dana Skinner —1978
- Joe Dickson — 1982, 1983, 1984
- Paul Neal — 1983
- John McVeigh — 1997
- Darren Duncan — 2009, 2010
- Dee Mency — 2011
- Wayne Mack — 2012
- Juvaris Hayes — 2018, 2019, 2020

=== Merrimack Athletics hall of fame ===
The following is a list of people associated with the Merrimack men's basketball program who were elected into the Merrimack Athletic Hall of Fame (induction date in parentheses)

- Roger Damphousse (1984)
- Ed Murphy (1984)
- W. Stephen McMahon (1985)
- Dana Skinner (1985)
- John Martin (1986)
- Ro Walsh (1986)
- Gerry Stopyra (1989)
- Frank T. Monahan (1989)
- Peter Dufour (1989)
- Bob Lemay (1991)
- Joseph P. Daley (1991)
- Joe Dickson (1991)
- Larry Roberson (1993)
- Paul Neal (2004)
- Darren Duncan (2017)
- Gary Duda (2022)

== Statistical leaders and records ==
All time point leaders
Rank	Player	Years	Points
1	Ed Murphy	1974-1978	2,874
2	Joe Dickson	1980-1984	2,130
3	Gelvis Solano	2012-2016	2,063
4	Darren Duncan	2006-2010	2,049
5	Darin Mency	2007-2011	2,039
6	Gary Duda	1988-1992	2,008
7	Juvaris Hayes	2016-2020	1,951
8	Paul Neal	1987-1991	1,922
9	Rodger Damphousse	1958-1962	1,774
10	Dana Skinner	1975-1978	1,746

All time rebound leaders
Rank	Player	Years	Rebounds
1	Larry Roberson	1971-1974	1,066
2	Craig Griffin	2000-2004	854
3	Jordan Minor	2019-2023	791
4	Reggie Carter	1996-2000	776
5	Juvaris Hayes	2016-2020	741
6	Darin Mency	2007-2011	735
7	Justin Leith	2001-2004	722
8	Billy Reilly	1966-1969	711
9	Steve McMahon	1968, 1970–1972	696
10	Tim Hart	1982-1986	678

Single season records

- Scoring average: Ed Murphy (32.0) 1976–77
- Field goals made: Ed Murphy (369) 1976–77
- Field goals attempted: Ed Murphy (610) 1977–78
- Field goal percentage: Tyler Young (72.5%) 2009–10
- 3 point field goals made: Gary Duda (128) 1991–92
- Most 3 point field goals attempted: Gary Duda (296) 1991–92
- 3 point field goal percentage: Joe Pazera (50.3% 73–145) 1986–87
- Free throws made: Darren Duncan (234) 2008–09
- Free throws attempted: Darren Duncan (292) 2008–09
- Free throw percentage: Dana Skinner (92.2%) 1977–78
- Rebounds: Larry Roberson (383) 1972–73
- Assist: Juvaris Hayes (287)

All time records

- Scoring average: Ed Murphy (26.4) 1974–78
- Field goals made: Ed Murphy (1,213) 1974–78
- Field goals attempted: Ed Murphy (2,098) 1974–78
- Field goal percentage: Aaron Strothers (64.0%) 2008–12
- 3 point field goals made: Gary Duda (389) 1988–92
- Most 3 point field goals attempted: Gary Duda (904) 1988–92
- 3 point field goal percentage: Troy Hammel (43.2% 205–473) 2012–16
- Free throws made: Darren Duncan (715) 2006–10
- Free throws attempted: Darren Duncan (918) 2006–2010
- Free throw percentage: Troy Hammel (88.3) 2012–16
- Rebounds per game average: Larry Roberson (14.0) 1971–74
- Assist per game average: Peter Dufour (9.0) 1975–78
- Assist: Juvaris Hayes (952) 2016–20

Single game records

- Most points in a game: Steve McMahon (52) 1971–72
- Most rebounds in a game: Larry Roberson (27) 1972–73
- Most assists in a game: Greg Hendra (22) 1982–83
- 3 point field goals made: Matt Van Leeuwen 3/7/99, Gary Duda 2/8/92, Ryan Boulter 1/30/17 and Ernest Shelton 10/13/25 (9)
- Most 3 point field goals attempted: Darren Mency (19) 2/23/11
- 3 point field goal percentage: Darren Alix (80% 8–10) 1/7/96

== Home Courts ==
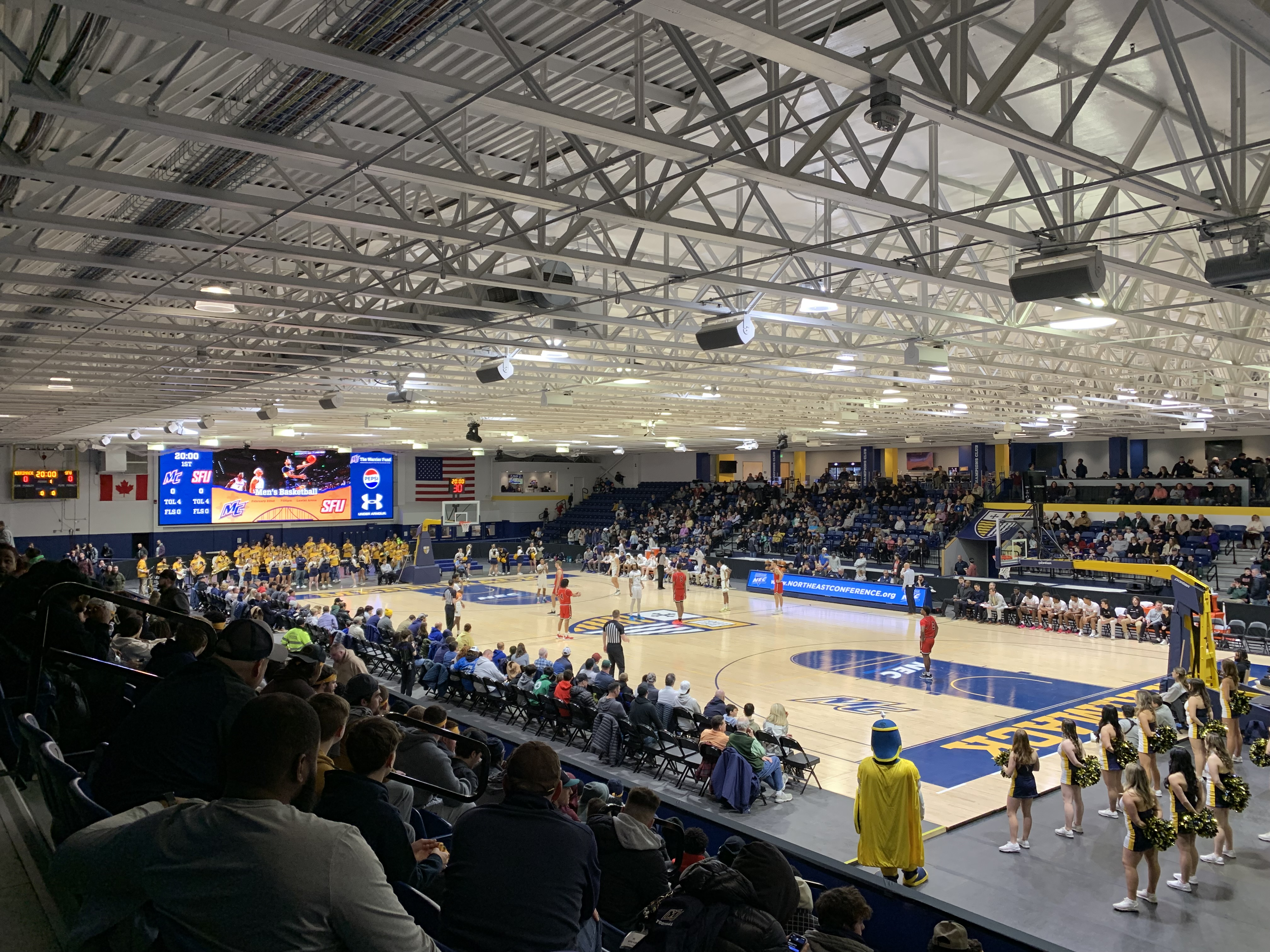
Lawler Arena on 2/22/24 hosting a game between Merrimack and Saint Francis

Since the program's inception in 1949. The Warriors have played their home games at Hammel Court located in the Merrimack athletic complex. The gym is named after former head coach Bert Hammel. In 2021 the warriors announced that Lawler arena (the hockey rink) would host its first ever basketball game. Ever since the 2021–22 season the warriors have split their home games between Hammel court and Lawler Arena.

During the 2025–26 season the team will play every single home game at Lawler Arena.

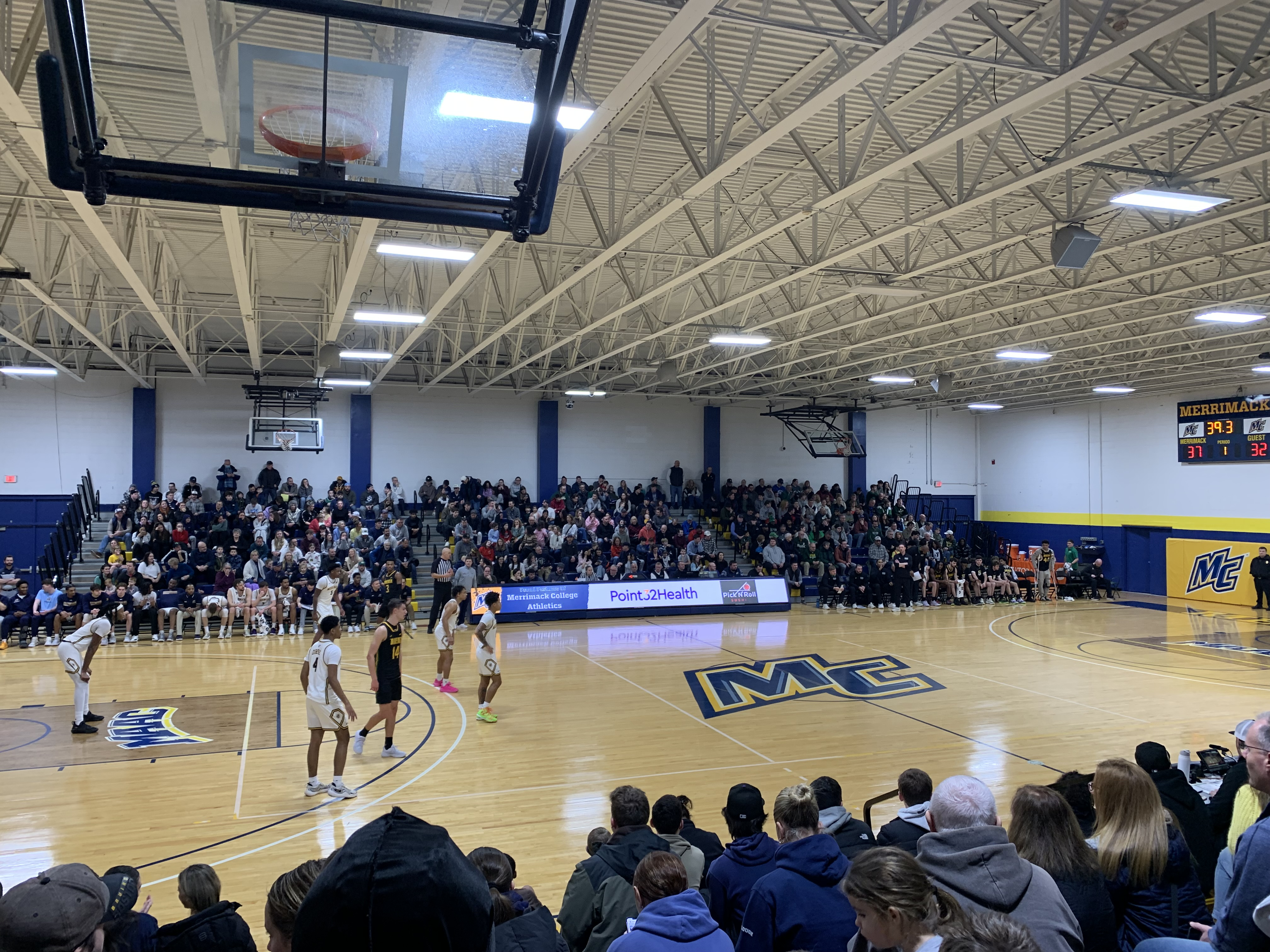
Hammel Court Merrimack Vs Siena 1/18/25

== Warriors in professional basketball ==
NBA/G League

- Ed Murphy (drafted by the Atlanta Hawks in 1978, 3x French League Foreign MVP, inducted into the French basketball hall of fame in 2021)
- Steve McMahon (drafted by the Cincinnati Royals in 1972)
- Dana Skinner (drafted by the Boston Celtics in 1978)
- Joe Dixon (drafted by the Boston Celtics in 1984)
- Jordan Minor (signed by the Long Island nets in 2024)

International Leagues

- Jacob O’Connell (signed with Coto Cordoba CB in 2025)
- Ziggy Reid (signed with Oberwart Gunners in 2024)
- Juvaris Hayes (signed with the Tigers Tübingen in 2020, he also played for Itzehoe Eagles and BC TSU Tbilisi)
- Gelvis Solano (currently plays for Dewa United Banten, former member of the Dominican Republic national baseball team)
- Darren Duncan (played 12 season in the National Basketball League of Canada)
