= List of Western Michigan Broncos men's basketball head coaches =

The following is a list of Western Michigan Broncos men's basketball head coaches. The Broncos have had 16 coaches in their 113-season history. The heading coaching position is vacant following the 2025–26 season.

Through 2025–26 season

Tenure	Coach	Years	Wins	Losses	Pct.
1913–1922	William H. Spaulding	9	77	43	.642
1922–1949	Buck Read	27	345	169	.671
1949–1952	William Perigo	3	41	27	.603
1952–1958	Joe Hoy	6	61	70	.466
1958–1966	Don Boven	8	75	112	.401
1966–1970	Sonny Means	4	38	57	.400
1970–1976	Eldon Miller	6	86	68	.558
1976–1979	Dick Shilts	3	28	56	.333
1979–1982	Les Wothke	3	42	41	.506
1982–1989	Vernon Payne	7	69	126	.354
1989–2000	Bob Donewald	11	152	154	.497
2000–2003	Robert McCullum	3	44	45	.494
2003–2020	Steve Hawkins	17	291	262	.526
2020–2022	Clayton Bates	2	13	39	.250
2022–2026	Dwayne Stephens	4	42	84	.333
2026–present					–
Totals	16 coaches	113 seasons	1404	1353	.509
