= Metro Conference Men's Basketball Coach of the Year =

- Awarded for: the most outstanding men's basketball head coach in the Metro Conference (formerly MAAC)
- Country: United States

History
- First award: 1982
- Most recent: Joe Gallo, Merrimack

The Metro Conference Men's Basketball Coach of the Year, formerly called the Metro Atlantic Athletic Conference Men's Basketball Coach of the Year, is a basketball award given to the most outstanding men's basketball head coach in the Metro Conference, as chosen by a panel of sports writers and broadcasters. The award was first given following the 1981–82 season, the first year of the conference's existence, to Bob Dukiet of Saint Peter's. Joe Mihalich of Niagara, Ted Fiore of Saint Peter's, and King Rice of Monmouth have won the most awards with three, while six other coaches have won the award twice.

It is not to be confused with the other Metro Conference which operated from 1975 to 1995 before merging with the Great Midwest Conference to form the current Conference USA.

== Key ==
| | Awarded one of the following National Coach of the Year awards that year: Associated Press Coach of the Year (AP); Adolph Rupp Cup (ARC); Basketball Times Coach of the Year (BT); CBS/Chevrolet Coach of the Year (CBS); Naismith Coach of the Year (N); NABC Coach of the Year (NABC); Sporting News Coach of the Year (SN); U.S. Basketball Writers Association (USBWA) |
| Coach (X) | Denotes the number of times the coach had been awarded the Coach of the Year award at that point |
| † | Co-Coaches of the Year |
| * | Elected to the Naismith Memorial Basketball Hall of Fame as a coach but is no longer active |
| *^ | Active coach who has been elected to the Naismith Memorial Hall of Fame (as a coach) |
| Conf. W–L | Conference win–loss record for that season |
| Conf. St.^{T} | Conference standing at year's end (^{T}denotes a tie) |
| Overall W–L | Overall win–loss record for that season |

== Winners ==
| Season | Coach | School | National Coach of the Year Awards | Conf. W–L | Conf. St. | Overall W–L |
|---|---|---|---|---|---|---|
| 1981–82 | Bob Dukiet | Saint Peter's | — | 9–1 | 1 | 20–9 |
| 1982–83 | Gordon Chiesa | Manhattan | — | 4–6 | 4 | 15–13 |
| 1983–84 | Pat Kennedy | Iona | — | 11–3 | 1^{T} | 23–8 |
| 1984–85 | Les Wothke | Army | — | 7–7 | 5 | 16–13 |
| 1985–86 | Mitch Buonaguro | Fairfield | — | 13–1 | 1 | 24–7 |
| 1986–87 | Ted Fiore | Saint Peter's | — | 11–3 | 1 | 21–8 |
| 1987–88 | Speedy Morris | La Salle | — | 14–0 | 1 | 24–10 |
| 1988–89^{†} | Speedy Morris (2) | La Salle | — | 13–1 | 1 | 26–6 |
| 1988–89^{†} | Ted Fiore (2) | Saint Peter's | — | 11–3 | 2 | 22–9 |
| 1989–90 | George Blaney | Holy Cross | — | 14–2 | 1 | 24–6 |
| 1990–91 | Ted Fiore (3) | Saint Peter's | — | 11–5 | 3^{T} | 24–7 |
| 1991–92 | Steve Lappas | Manhattan | — | 13–3 | 1 | 25–9 |
| 1992–93 | Jack Armstrong | Niagara | — | 11–3 | 2 | 23–7 |
| 1993–94 | John Beilein | Canisius | — | 12–2 | 1 | 22–7 |
| 1994–95 | Fran Fraschilla | Manhattan | — | 12–2 | 1 | 26–5 |
| 1995–96 | Paul Cormier | Fairfield | — | 10–4 | 1^{T} | 20–10 |
| 1996–97 | Tim Welsh | Iona | — | 11–3 | 1 | 22–8 |
| 1997–98 | Tim Welsh (2) | Iona | — | 15–3 | 1 | 27–6 |
| 1998–99 | Joe Mihalich | Niagara | — | 13–5 | 1^{T} | 17–12 |
| 1999–2000 | Paul Hewitt | Siena | — | 15–3 | 1 | 24–9 |
| 2000–01 | Dave Magarity | Marist | — | 11–7 | 4^{T} | 17–13 |
| 2001–02 | Don Harnum | Rider | — | 13–5 | 1^{T} | 17–11 |
| 2002–03 | Bobby Gonzalez | Manhattan | — | 14–4 | 1 | 23–7 |
| 2003–04 | Tim O'Toole | Fairfield | — | 12–6 | 3^{T} | 19–11 |
| 2004–05 | Joe Mihalich (2) | Niagara | — | 13–5 | 1^{T} | 20–10 |
| 2005–06 | Bobby Gonzalez (2) | Manhattan | — | 14–4 | 1 | 20–11 |
| 2006–07 | Matt Brady | Marist | — | 14–4 | 1 | 25–9 |
| 2007–08 | Tommy Dempsey | Rider | — | 13–5 | 1^{T} | 23–11 |
| 2008–09 | Fran McCaffery | Siena | — | 16–2 | 1 | 27–8 |
| 2009–10 | Kevin Willard | Iona | — | 12–6 | 3 | 21–10 |
| 2010–11 | Ed Cooley | Fairfield | — | 15–3 | 1 | 25–8 |
| 2011–12 | Jimmy Patsos | Loyola (MD) | — | 13–5 | 2 | 24–9 |
| 2012–13 | Joe Mihalich (3) | Niagara | — | 13–5 | 1 | 19–14 |
| 2013–14 | Tim Cluess | Iona | — | 17–3 | 1 | 22–11 |
| 2014–15 | Kevin Baggett | Rider | — | 15–5 | 2 | 21–12 |
| 2015–16 | King Rice | Monmouth | — | 17–3 | 1 | 28–8 |
| 2016–17 | King Rice (2) | Monmouth | — | 18–2 | 1 | 27–7 |
| 2017–18 | Kevin Baggett (2) | Rider | — | 15–3 | 1^{T} | 22–10 |
| 2018–19 | Tim Cluess (2) | Iona | — | 12–6 | 1 | 17–16 |
| 2019–20 | Shaheen Holloway | Saint Peter's | — | 14–6 | 2 | 18–12 |
| 2020–21 | King Rice (3) | Monmouth | — | 12–6 | 2 | 12–7 |
| 2021–22 | Rick Pitino | Iona | — | 17–3 | 2 | 25–6 |
| 2022–23 | Rick Pitino (2) | Iona | — | 17–3 | 1 | 27–8 |
| 2023–24 | Tom Pecora | Quinnipiac | — | 15–5 | 1 | 23–8 |
| 2024–25 | Tom Pecora (2) | Quinnipiac | — | 15–5 | 1 | 19–12 |
| 2025–26 | Joe Gallo | Merrimack | | 21–10 | 1 | 17–3 |

== Winners by school ==
| School (year joined) | Winners | Years |
|---|---|---|
| Iona (1981) | 7 | 1984, 1997, 1998, 2010, 2014, 2019, 2022 |
| Manhattan (1981) | 5 | 1983, 1992, 1995, 2003, 2006 |
| Saint Peter's (1981) | 5 | 1982, 1987, 1989^{†}, 1991, 2020 |
| Fairfield (1981) | 4 | 1986, 1996, 2004, 2011 |
| Niagara (1989) | 4 | 1993, 1999, 2005, 2013 |
| Rider (1997) | 4 | 2002, 2008, 2015, 2018 |
| Monmouth (2013) (Note: Monmouth left for the Colonial Athletic Association, now known as the Coastal Athletic Association, in 2022.) | 3 | 2016, 2017, 2021 |
| La Salle (1983) (Note: La Salle left for the Midwestern Collegiate Conference in 1992. It is now in the Atlantic 10 Conference.) | 2 | 1988, 1989^{†} |
| Marist (1997) | 2 | 2001, 2007 |
| Siena (1989) | 2 | 2000, 2009 |
| Quinnipiac (2013) | 2 | 2024, 2025 |
| Army (1981) (Note: Army, Fordham, and Holy Cross left for the Patriot League in 1990.) | 1 | 1985 |
| Canisius (1989) | 1 | 1994 |
| Holy Cross (1983) | 1 | 1990 |
| Loyola (MD) (1989) (Note: Loyola (MD) left for the Patriot League in 2013.) | 1 | 2012 |
| Merrimack (2024) | 1 | 2026 |
| Fordham (1981) | 0 | — |
| Mount St. Mary's (2022) | 0 | — |
| Sacred Heart (2024) | 0 | — |

== See also ==
- List of coaches in the Naismith Memorial Basketball Hall of Fame
- Metro Atlantic Athletic Conference Men's Basketball Player of the Year
