= North Alabama Lions men's basketball =

College basketball team

2026–27 North Alabama Lions men's basketball team
- University: University of North Alabama
- Head coach: Tony Pujol (9th season)
- Location: Florence, Alabama
- Arena: Flowers Hall (capacity: 4,000)
- Conference: UAC
- Nickname: Lions
- Colors: Purple and gold
- Student section: The Vault

NCAA Division I tournament champions
- 1979*, 1991*
Other NCAA Division I tournament results
Final Four	1977*, 1979*, 1980*, 1984*, 1991*
Elite Eight	1977*, 1979*, 1980*, 1981*, 1984*, 1991*, 1996*, 2008*
Sweet Sixteen	1977*, 1979*, 1980*, 1981*, 1984*, 1991*, 1996*, 2008*
Appearances	1977*, 1979*, 1980*, 1981*, 1984*, 1988*, 1991*, 1994*, 1995*, 1996*, 2006*, 2008*, 2013*, 2014*

Conference tournament champions
- Gulf South; 1981, 1984, 1988, 1994, 1996, 2014

Conference regular-season champions
- ASUN; 2025 Gulf South; 1977, 1981, 1984, 1994, 1996, 2014

Uniforms
Home	Away
- * at Division II level

The North Alabama Lions men's basketball team represents University of North Alabama in Florence, Alabama, United States. The school's team currently competes in the UAC. On July 1, 2026, they, along with four other Atlantic Sun Conference schools, joined the rebranded United Athletic Conference as a part of a strategic alliance between the two conferences. Since joining NCAA Division I, the Lions have not yet appeared in the NCAA Tournament. At the NCAA Division II level, North Alabama won the 1979 and 1991 national championship.

== Postseason ==
=== NIT results ===
North Alabama has appeared in one National Invitation Tournament. Their record is 0–1.

Year	Round	Opponent	Result
2025	First Round	Bradley	L 62–71

=== CBI results ===
North Alabama has appeared in one CBI tournament. Their record is 0–1.

Year	Round	Opponent	Result
2023	First Round	Southern Utah	L 50–72

=== NCAA Division II results ===
North Alabama appeared in the NCAA Division II men's basketball tournament fourteen times. Their record was 31–13.

Year	Round	Opponent	Result
1977	Round of 32; Sweet Sixteen; Elite Eight; Final Four; National Third Place	Southern; Troy State; Cal Poly; Randolph–Macon; Sacred Heart	W 105–88; W 77–70; W 67–64 (OT); L 67–82; W 93–77
1979	Round of 32; Sweet Sixteen; Elite Eight; Final Four; National Championship	Florida Southern; Valdosta State; Nicholls State; Bridgeport; Green Bay	W 75–67; W 110–101; W 103–97; W 85–82; W 64–50
1980	Round of 32; Sweet Sixteen; Elite Eight; Final Four; National Third Place	Central Missouri State; Nicholls State; UC Riverside; NYIT; Florida Southern	W 98–86; W 77–68; W 76–69; L 66–72; L 67–68
1981	Round of 32; Sweet Sixteen; Elite Eight	Lincoln; NE Missouri State; Wisconsin–Green Bay	W 67–53; W 63–59; L 39–65
1984	Round of 32; Sweet Sixteen; Elite Eight; Final Four	Albany State; West Georgia; San Francisco State; Central Missouri State	W 86–73; W 66–65; W 76–68; L 85–89 (OT)
1988	Round of 32; Regional Third Place	Florida Southern; Norfolk State	L 76–99; W 87–76
1991	Round of 32; Sweet Sixteen; Elite Eight; Final Four; National Championship	Hampton; Troy State; Ashland; Virginia Union; Bridgeport	W 94–80; W 93–86; W 92–84; W 97–76; W 79–72
1994	Round of 32; Sweet Sixteen	West Texas A&M; Washburn	W 74–67; L 73–92
1995	First Round	Central Missouri State	L 75–95
1996	First Round; Second Round; Sweet Sixteen; Elite Eight	Delta State; Texas A&M–Kingsville; Missouri–Rolla; Fort Hays State	W 78–69; W 85–80; W 92–80; L 68–71
2006	First Round	Arkansas–Monticello	L 81–90
2008	First Round; Second Round; Sweet Sixteen; Elite Eight	Christian Brothers; Ouachita Baptist; Benedict; Bentley	W 72–71; W 99–93 (OT); W 97–75; L 92–102
2013	First Round	Florida Southern	L 80–94
2014	First Round; Second Round	Tampa; Tuskegee	W 72–68; L 87–93

=== NAIA results ===
The Lions have appeared in the NAIA tournament twice. Both appearances resulted in first round losses.

Year	Round	Opponent	Result
1960	First Round	(5) Hamline (MN)	L 83-88(2OT)
1962	First Round	(10) St. Cloud State (MN)	L 54-86

== History ==
The men's basketball program at the University of North Alabama is one of the most successful in collegiate basketball, having claimed two national championships, made five Final Four appearances and played in 14 NCAA championship tournaments.

The foundation for UNA's success in basketball, and its entire athletic program, was put in place by Eddie Flowers. After coming to UNA (then Florence State Teachers College) in 1929, Flowers began the school's athletic program in 1932 and coached the first basketball team that season. He remained as basketball coach until 1948 and as athletic director until 1969. When the Lions' new basketball facility was opened in 1972, it was only fitting that it be named for the founder of Lion athletics - Eddie Flowers - and was named Flowers Hall.

Ed Billingham was hired as the school's second men's basketball coach in 1948 and he directed the Lions for the next 24 years, winning 249 games. He also led the Lions to the NAIA National Tournament in 1960 and 1962.

Bill E. Jones was hired as UNA's third basketball head coach in 1972 and had a 28-17 record in two seasons. Lion basketball alumnus Bill L.

Jones was hired in 1974 and the Lion basketball fortunes went to a new level. In 14 seasons, Jones led UNA to six NCAA Tournament appearances and four trips to the Final Four, including an NCAA Division II National Championship in 1979. UNA was the first college or university in the state to win a basketball national championship and is one of just four Division II programs to have won more than one Division II basketball championship. Jones led UNA to Gulf South Conference championships in 1977, 1981 and 1984 and GSC Tournament titles in 1981, 1984 and 1988. He led UNA to NCAA Tournaments in 1977, 1979, 1980, 1981, 1984 and 1988, with his teams winning regional crowns in 1977, 1979, 1980, 1981 and 1984. Under Jones, UNA went to the Final Four in 1977, 1979, 1980 and 1984. In 14 his seasons, Jones led his UNA squads to a combined 165-37 home record at Flowers Hall for an 81.7 winning percentage.

UNA’s fourth head coach, Gary Elliott, continued the Lions' success story, taking his teams to a 252-140 record overall and a 148-49 record at home. In Elliott's 15 seasons, he led the Lions to their second national championship in 1991, four NCAA appearances in 1991, 1994, 1995, and 1996 and an average of better than 19 wins per season. The Lions have won 20 or more games five times under Elliott. Elliott, who retired at the end of the 2002-03 season, helped place UNA among the division's elite.

Bobby Champagne took over the Lions Basketball program for the 2003-04 campaign, leading the Lions to the GSC Tournament in each of Champagne’s 15 seasons at the helm of the program. On Nov. 20, 2004, the Lions knocked off top-ranked Southern Indiana 78-75 at home on its way to a 10-4 record at Flowers Hall.

In 2006, the Lions returned to the NCAA tournament for the first time in 10 seasons finishing with an 18-11 record. Two years later, UNA was back in the Elite Eight. The Lions went 27-9 during the 2007-08 campaign and won the South Region Tournament before falling to top-ranked Bentley at the Mass Mutual Building in Springfield, Mass. The Lions added back-to-back NCAA trips in 12-13 and 13-14, including a GSC title in 2014 with a 79-73 victory over Christian Brothers in the championship game.

North Alabama began its transition to NCAA Division I status in 2018 and joined the ASUN Conference. After hiring Tony Pujol to lead the program, The Lions posted a 10-22 record during its first Division I season, earning a No. 6 seed in the ASUN Tournament with a 7-9 league record after being picked to finish last in the preseason coaches’ poll. He followed with a three-win improvement in the second year and a No. 5 seed in the conference tourney.

=== Eddie Flowers ===
Eddie Flowers is considered the father of UNA men's basketball. After his arrival at what was then known as Florence State Teachers College in 1929, Flowers initiated the school's athletic program in 1932 and coached the first basketball team that season. Flowers served as basketball coach until 1948 and remained the athletic director until 1972. Flowers Hall, the university's basketball facility, is named after the long-serving coach and athletic administrator.

=== Ed Billingham ===
Flower's successor Ed Billingham coached the team for the next 24 years, winning 249 games. He also led the Lions to the NAIA National Tournament in 1960 and 1962.

=== Bill E. Jones ===
Bill E. Jones assumed the head coaching job in 1972, posting a 28–17 record over two seasons.

=== Bill L. Jones ===
Hired as head coach in 1974, Bill L. Jones, a Lion basketball alumnus, led UNA to six NCAA Tournament appearances and four appearances at the Final Four, including an NCAA Division II National Championship in 1979. UNA was the first Alabama college or university to win a national championship title in basketball and is only one of four Division II programs to have earned more than one Division II basketball national championships.

Under Jones’ leadership, the Lions secured three Gulf South Conference championships in 1977, 1981, and 1984 and three GSC Tournament Titles in 1981, 1984 and 1988. Jones led UNA to NCAA Tournaments in 1977, 1979, 1980, 1981, 1984 and 1988, with his teams winning regional crowns in 1977, 1979, 1980, 1981 and 1984.

During Jones’ tenure, UNA also went to the Final Four in 1977, 1979, 1980 and 1984. During Jones’ 14-season UNA basketball coaching career, his teams amassed a 165–37 home record at Flowers Hall for an 81.7 winning percentage.

=== Gary Elliott ===
Over the course of his 15-season tenure at UNA, Coach Gary Elliot, secured a 252–140 overall record and a 148–49 home record. He also led the Lions to their second national championship in 1991, as well as to four NCAA appearances in 1991, 1994, 1995, and 1996.

=== Bobby Champagne ===
Coach Bobby Champagne, who coached his first season in 2003–04, led the Lions to a 12–16 record, followed by a 14–14 the next season. Champagne, UNA's sixth head basketball coach, led the Lions to fifteen straight Gulf South Conference tournament appearances and to the program's first NCAA Tournament since 1996. After taking over the reins in 2003, he has returned the Lion program to a position of national prominence.

Under Champagne, the Lions advanced to fifteen straight Gulf South Conference tournaments and four NCAA tournaments, including an NCAA Division II South Regional Championship in the 2007–08 season. He was 245–194 during his tenure at North Alabama.

After finishing the 2007–08 season at 27–8 and re-writing much of the school's record book in the process, the Lions were 18–10 in 2009. Kenny Johnson was named GSC East Player of the Year. The Lions posted back-to-back 13–16 campaigns over the last two years while twice advancing to the semi-finals of the GSC Tournament.

Champagne, who was honored by the NABC as South Region Coach of the Year in 2008, had been affiliated with 11 postseason tournament teams (nine NCAA, two NIT) during his 23-year collegiate coaching career. He came to UNA after one season as an assistant coach at the University of Texas-El Paso.

In his first season at UNA, Champagne led the Lions to a 12–16 record that also included a berth in the 2004 GSC tournament. The following season, the Lions improved to 14–14, and again were participants in the conference tourney.

During the 2004–05 campaign, UNA knocked off several ranked teams in the regular season, including No. 1 Southern Indiana on Nov. 20 at Flowers Hall. The Lions finished the year with a 14–14 mark. In 2005–06, UNA was 18–11, played in the GSC Tournament and received an NCAA South Regional bid. The NCAA postseason nod was the first for the Lions since 1996 and the eighth for Champagne. The Lions had their second consecutive winning season in 2006–07, going 15–14. The Lions advanced to the semifinals of the GSC Tournament during the 2009-10 and 2010-11 seasons. UNA w then went 19-9 during the 2012-13 season and returned to the NCAA Tournament. The 2013-14 season was capped with a second straight NCAA Tournament as well as a GSC Tournament Championship. UNA advanced to the second round of the NCAA South Regional. Champagne's contract was not renewed in 2018 when the Lions moved to Division I.

=== Tony Pujol ===
Tony Pujol was hired on April 2, 2018 after serving as an assistant basketball coach at Appalachian State University, Virginia Commonwealth University and the University of Alabama before taking a position at Wyoming in 2016. He became just the seventh head coach in the 88-year history of the UNA’s men’s basketball program.

Pujol led North Alabama as the school began its transition to NCAA Division I basketball in the 2018-19 season as a member of the ASUN Conference. The Lions posted a 10-22 record during its first Division I season, earning a No. 6 seed in the ASUN Tournament with a 7-9 league record after being picked to finish last in the preseason coaches’ poll. He followed with a three-win improvement in the second year and a No. 5 seed in the conference tourney.
