= Northeast Conference Men's Basketball Rookie of the Year =

NEC Men's Basketball Rookie of the Year
- Awarded for: the most outstanding freshman male basketball player in the Northeast Conference
- Country: United States
- First award: 1983
- Currently held by: David Jevtic, Fairleigh Dickinson

The Northeast Conference (NEC) Men's Basketball Rookie of the Year is an award given to the basketball player in the Northeast Conference voted as the most outstanding freshman player. The award was first given after the second season of NEC basketball, the 1982–83 season. From the 1982–83 season through the 1998–99 season the award was called the Newcomer of the Year Award before being renamed to the Rookie of the Year Award for the 1999–2000 season. Robert Morris is the school with the most award wins, with five.

== Winners ==
Year	Player	School
1983	Kevin House	Loyola (MD)
1984	Tom Gormley	Loyola (MD)
1985	Rik Smits	Marist
1986	Miroslav Pecarski	Marist
1987	Steve Vandiver	Robert Morris
1988	Andre Kibbler	St. Francis Brooklyn
1989	Desi Wilson	Fairleigh Dickinson
1990	Alex Blackwell	Monmouth
1991	Ron Arnold	St. Francis Brooklyn
1992	Miladin Mutavdzic	Wagner
1993	Chris McGuthrie	Mount St. Mary's
1994	Charles Smith	Rider
1995	Rahshon Turner	Fairleigh Dickinson
1996	Ryan Reed	Wagner
1997	Richie Parker	Long Island
1998	Richy Dominguez	St. Francis Brooklyn
1999	Alpha Bangura	Monmouth
2000	Jermaine Hall	Wagner
2001	Peter Mulligan	UMBC
2002	Rob Monroe	Quinnipiac
2003	Darshan Luckey	Saint Francis
2004	James Williams	Long Island
2005	Allan Sheppard	St. Francis Brooklyn
2006	Jeremy Chappell	Robert Morris
2007	Jhamar Youngblood	Monmouth
2008	Shemik Thompson	Central Connecticut
2009	Julian Boyd	Long Island
2010	Karon Abraham	Robert Morris
2011	Alex Francis	Bryant
2012	Kyle Vinales	Central Connecticut
2013	Shivaughn Wiggins	Mount St. Mary's
2014	Malik Harmon	Saint Francis
2015	Marcquise Reed	Robert Morris
2016	Marcel Pettway	Bryant
2017	Keith Braxton	Saint Francis
2018	Koby Thomas	Robert Morris
2019	Vado Morse	Mount St. Mary's
2020	Michael Green III	Bryant
2021	DeLonnie Hunt	Wagner
2022	Anquan Hill	Fairleigh Dickinson
2023	Javon Bennett	Merrimack
2024	Adam “Budd” Clark	Merrimack
2025	Juan Cranford Jr.	Saint Francis
2026	David Jevtic	Fairleigh Dickinson

== Winners by school ==
School (NEC participation)	Winners	Years
Robert Morris (1981–2020)	5	1987, 2006, 2010, 2015, 2018
St. Francis Brooklyn (1981–2023)	4	1988, 1991, 1998, 2005
Wagner (1981–present)	4	1992, 1996, 2000, 2021
Saint Francis (1981–present)	4	2003, 2014, 2017, 2025
Fairleigh Dickinson (1981–present)	4	1989, 1995, 2022, 2026
Bryant (2008–2022)	3	2011, 2016, 2020
Long Island (1981–present)	3	1997, 2004, 2009
Monmouth (1985–2013)	3	1990, 1999, 2007
Mount St. Mary's (1989–2022)	3	1993, 2013, 2019
Central Connecticut (1997–present)	2	2008, 2012
Loyola (MD) (1981–1989)	2	1983, 1984
Marist (1981–1997)	2	1985, 1986
Merrimack (2019–2024)	2	2023, 2024
Quinnipiac (1998–2013)	1	2002
Rider (1992–1997)	1	1994
UMBC (1998–2003)	1	2001
Le Moyne (2023–present)	0	
Stonehill (2022–present)	0	
