= Jordan Derkack =

American college basketball player

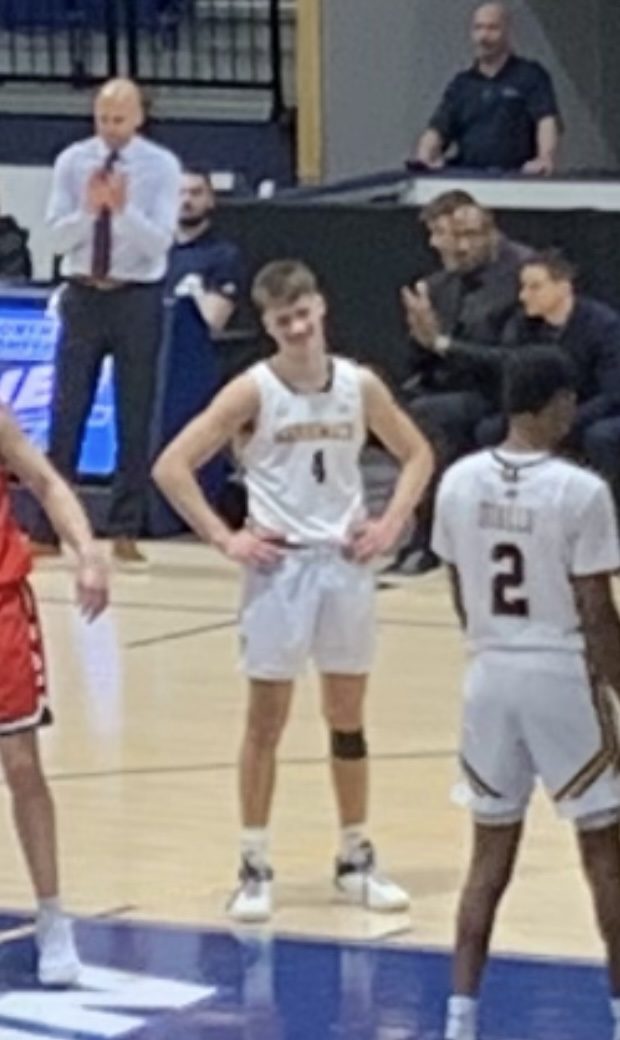
- Derkack with Merrimack in 2024

Free agent
- Position: Shooting guard

Personal information
- Born: March 28, 2003 (age 23)
- Listed height: 6 ft 5 in (1.96 m)
- Listed weight: 212 lb (96 kg)

Career information
- High school: Colonia (Woodbridge Township, New Jersey); SPIRE Academy (Geneva, Ohio)
- College: Merrimack (2022–2024); Rutgers (2024–2025); Dayton (2025–2026)
- NBA draft: 2026: undrafted
- Playing career: 2026–present

Career history
- 2026: Capital City Go-Go

Career highlights
- NEC Player of the Year (2024); NEC Defensive Player of the Year (2024); First-team All-NEC (2024); NEC All-Rookie Team (2023)

Jordan Derkack (born March 28, 2003) is an American basketball player who last played for the Capital City Go-Go of the NBA G League. He played college basketball for the Merrimack Warriors, Rutgers Scarlet Knights and Dayton Flyers.

== Early life and high school career ==
Derkack is the son of Gene Derkack, who played college basketball at FIU, and his mother played soccer at the school. Raised in Woodbridge Township, New Jersey, Derkack attended Colonia High School. As a senior, he averaged 13.6 points, 7.0 rebounds, 4.8 assists, and 2.0 steals per game, before doing a prep year at SPIRE Academy. He committed to play college basketball at Merrimack.

=== Personal life ===
Jordan is oldest in the Derkack family. Aiden Derkack is youngest of the family; recently signed to play for Providence Friars but ultimately signed with Dayton following his brother. Their sister, Taylor Derkack is a current member of the UMass Minutewomen's basketball team.

== College career ==
As a freshman, Derkack averaged 7.4 points and 4.0 rebounds per game. He averaged 17.0 points, 6.0 rebounds and 3.9 assists per game as a sophomore. Derkack was named NEC Player of the Year. Following the season, he transferred to Rutgers, choosing the Scarlet Knights over Seton Hall and Penn State. Derkack averaged 5.7 points, 2.8 rebounds and 1.5 assists per game at Rutgers. He opted to transfer to Dayton after the season. Derkack underwent foot surgery in June 2025. He averaged 9.2 points and 4.5 rebounds per game at Dayton.

== Professional career ==
For the 2026-27 season, Derkack joined the Iowa Wolves of the NBA G League.
