= Caleb McConnell =

American basketball player (born 1999)

No. 22 – Rio Grande Valley Vipers
- Position: Shooting guard
- League: NBA G League

Personal information
- Born: June 8, 1999 (age 27) Jacksonville, Florida, U.S.
- Listed height: 6 ft 7 in (2.01 m)
- Listed weight: 195 lb (88 kg)

Career information
- High school: Dunbar (Dayton, Ohio)
- College: Rutgers (2018–2023)
- NBA draft: 2023: undrafted
- Playing career: 2023–present

Career history
- 2023–2024: Oklahoma City Blue
- 2024–2025: Greensboro Swarm
- 2025–present: Rio Grande Valley Vipers

Career highlights
- NBA G League champion (2024); Lefty Driesell Award (2023); 2× All-Big Ten Defensive Player of the Year (2022, 2023); 2× All-Big Ten Defensive Team (2022, 2023)
- Stats at NBA.com
- Stats at Basketball Reference

Caleb McConnell (born June 8, 1999) is an American professional basketball player for the Rio Grande Valley Vipers of the NBA G League. He played college basketball for the Rutgers Scarlet Knights, where he played in the second round of the 2021 NCAA Division I men's basketball tournament, became the team's steals leader at the first round of the 2023 National Invitation Tournament and won the Reese's College All-Star Game with the West. He ended that year with 221 steals and 972 points.

In the Big Ten Conference, he held the season record for steals twice. He was named their Defensive Player of the Year in 2022 and shared the award in 2023 with Chase Audige. Throughout 2023, McConnell won the Lefty Driesell Award and was in the top four with the Naismith Defensive Player of the Year Award. Outside of college, he played with the Oklahoma City Thunder during 2023 in the NBA Summer League. With the Oklahoma City Blue, McConnell was a 2024 G-League champion.

== Early life and education ==
McConnell was born in Dayton, Ohio on June 8, 1999. During his childhood, McConnell lived in Dayton and Jacksonville, Florida with two siblings after the divorce of their parents. He played football before becoming interested in basketball. With Dunbar High School from 2014 to 2017, he had 346 rebounds as part of his 686 points. While with Dunbar at the 2015 OHSAA Boys Basketball State Tournament, his team played in a semifinal for Division II schools. In 2018, he completed his boys basketball career at Spire Academy.

== College career ==
Before McConnell started playing for Rutgers University in 2018, he had surgery to fix a foot injury. The following year, McConnell had surgery for his hip. After hurting his back, McConnell decided to stopped playing for a year during October 2020. By the end of 2020, he had back surgery. In January 2021, McConnell made an early return to the team "after missing ... eight games". That year, his team reached the second round of the 2021 NCAA Division I men's basketball tournament.

In 2022, McConnell decided to not enter the NBA draft and instead remain at Rutgers. Throughout the year, he "[missed] five games with a knee injury". At the 2023 National Invitation Tournament, he became the steals leader for Rutgers while his team played in the first round. During these two years, McConnell held the season steals record for the Big Ten Conference. He had 606 rebounds, 221 steals and 972 points overall after leaving the team in 2023. Outside of Rutgers, his West team won the 2023 Reese's College All-Star Game.

While competing as a 17U player in the Under Armour Association during 2017, he had 74 rebounds and 18 steals with C2K Elite. His team competed in that year's UAA Finals. Throughout 2023, McConnell participated at the G League Elite Camp and the Portsmouth Invitational Tournament.

== Professional career ==
=== Oklahoma City Blue (2023–2024) ===
After going undrafted in the 2023 NBA draft, McConnell joined the Oklahoma City Thunder for the 2023 NBA Summer League and on October 31, 2023, he joined the Oklahoma City Blue. Throughout the year, he had 174 rebounds and 200 points before becoming a 2024 G-League Finals winner.

=== Greensboro Swarm (2024–2025) ===
On September 11, 2024, McConnell signed with the Charlotte Hornets, but was waived on October 2. On October 27, he joined the Greensboro Swarm.

=== Rio Grande Valley Vipers (2025–present) ===
On October 14, 2025, McConnell was traded to the Rio Grande Valley Vipers in a four team trade. On October 17, 2025, McConnell signed with the Houston Rockets, but was waived shortly after. He later returned to the Vipers on October 24.

== Awards and honors ==
McConnell was the Defensive Player of the Year for the Big Ten during 2022. He shared this Big Ten award with Chase Audige during 2023. That year, he was an All-Met for the Metropolitan Basketball Writers Association. He also won the Lefty Driesell Award and was in the top four with the Naismith Defensive Player of the Year Award.
