= Frank T. Monahan =

American college basketball head coach

- Monahan in 1975

Biographical details
- Born: Concord, New Hampshire, U.S.
- Died: November 21, 2000 (60); Concord, New Hampshire, U.S.
- Education: Merrimack College

Playing career
- 1958-1962: Merrimack

Coaching career (HC unless noted)
- 1963-1964: Concord High School
- 1964-1968: Bishop Brady High School
- 1970-1980: Merrimack
- 1991-1998: Brady Bishop High School

Head coaching record
- Overall: 128–134 (.489)
- Tournaments: 2–2 (NCAA Division II)

Accomplishments and honors

Championships
- NHIAA state champion (1964); NHIAA state champion (1965); NHIAA state champion (1966); NHIAA state champion (1997)

Awards
- New England UPI Division II Coach of the Year (1978); Merrimack athletics Hall of Fame (1989); Brady Bishop Athletics Hall of Fame (2003)

Frank T. Monahan was an American college basketball head coach for the Merrimack Warriors men's basketball team. He led the Warriors to back-to-back appearances in the NCAA Division II Sweet 16s in 1977 and 1978.

== Personal life ==
Monahan was a resident of Concord, New Hampshire. He was a all-state guard in high school and went on to attend Merrimack College and played on the school’s basketball team. He would later join the Air Force after graduating.

He and his wife had 5 children together and following his death, his family started the Monahan foundation which helped give funding to youth sports in New Hampshire.

== Coaching career ==
After coming back home from the Air Force Monahan would get his first job at Concord High School coaching their for 2 seasons. Then taking the job at Bishop Brady High School. He would win 3 straight NHIAA state titles during his tenure and at one point having a 69 game winning streak.

Monahan would then return to his Alma mater at Merrimack where he would start out as an assistant athletic director. When coach William S. LaRochelle left after the 1969–70 season, Monahan took over the job as head coach of his old team. Monahan's first five seasons were somewhat mediocre, going 55–71 during this time. But during the 1975–76 season he and the Warriors took a big step forward as Monahan led them to their first 20-win season in program history. They would keep this momentum into next season, when he led the Warriors to a 19–9 record, resulting in their first ever NCAA Division II tournament berth in program history. The Warriors made it to the Sweet Sixteen round of the tournament that year, beating Bridgeport in the first round 107–83. They fell to Sacred Heart 110–104 in the Sweet 16. After leading the Warriors to one of the best seasons in program history, Monahan would one-up this in the 1977–78 season by leading the Warriors to a 22–6 record the team would be ranked as high as #2 in the country during the season. As they would get back into the NCAA Division II tournament for a second year in a row. Once again the Warriors won their first round matchup, dominating Bryant 116–91. But for the second year in a row the Warriors would meet Sacred Heart in the Sweet Sixteen, this time losing 84–83. At the conclusion of the season Monahan would be honored when he was named the 1978 UPI Division II Coach of the Year in New England. These two seasons would be the furthest Merrimack ever made it in the Division II tournament. Monahan would coach the warriors for two more years before resigning after the 1979–80 season after suffering from the first of 3 heart attacks in his life. Monahan would later inducted into the Merrimack College athletic hall of fame in 1989.

Following his departure from Merrimack Monahan worked as an NBA scout throughout the 1980s and also served as the general manager of New Hampshire’s basketball team in The United States Basketball League.

After his coaching career being halted due to the heart attack he would try to get the job at the University of New Hampshire, after that failed he would go back to coaching at Brady Bishop in the 1990s for 7 years coaching them to a fourth state title in 1997.

Monahan died after suffering another heart attack in 2000. He was inducted into the Bishop Brady High School hall of fame in 2003.

=== Coaching philosophy ===
During his time at Merrimack Monahan was also known for his intense recruiting stating "We want gym rats to play here," when I go out to recruit, I'm looking for the kid who thinks the whole year is divided into 27 parts the 27 nights we play." During his tenure the gym was open 24 hours a day and Monahan fully expected the athletes to play 350 days a year if they wanted to. this was known as the Monahan method. He would also regularly tell Merrimack athletic director Thom Lawler “I wanted to schedule Division 1 teams, good Division 1 teams”. This would actually come to fruition as the warriors would play Villanova a couple of times during Monahan tenure. Even almost upsetting them during the 1976-77 season. After the game in question a reporter from somerset news told him they had never heard of Merrimack college Monahan responded by saying “Well I’ve never heard of somerset news.”

== Head coaching record ==
Season	Team	Win	Loss	Postseason
1970–71	Merrimack Warriors	11	13	
1971–72	Merrimack Warriors	16	8	
1972–73	Merrimack Warriors	8	18	
1973–74	Merrimack Warriors	9	17	
1974–75	Merrimack Warriors	11	15	
1975–76	Merrimack Warriors	21	8	
1976–77	Merrimack Warriors	19	9	NCAA Sweet 16 (W Bridgeport 107–83) L Sacred Heart (110–104)
1977–78	Merrimack Warriors	22	6	NCAA Sweet 16 (W Bryant 116–91) ( L Sacred Heart 84–83)
1978–79	Merrimack Warriors	3	24	
1979–80	Merrimack Warriors	9	18	
	Total	128	134	

Note* Merrimack was not in a conference during this time
