= Bert Hammel =

American College basketball coach and Scout

Biographical details
- Born: April 11, 1951; New York, New York, U.S.
- Died: October 6, 2018 (aged 67)
- Education: Bentley University

Playing career
- 1969-1973: Bentley Falcons

Coaching career (HC unless noted)
- 1974-1979: Merrimack college Assistant
- 1980-2016: Merrimack College

Head coaching record
- Overall: 526-491(.517)
- Tournaments: 3-6 (NCAA Division II tournament)

Accomplishments and honors

Championships
- x2 NE10 tournament (1992, 2000) x1 NE10 regular season (1999) x3 ECAC tournament champion (1989, 1998, 1999)

Awards
- Bentley athletics hall of fame (1990); NE10 Coach of the year (1991); The Eagle-Tribune Sports Person of the Year (2017)

Records
- Most all time wins at Merrimack College 526

Bert Hammel was an American college basketball coach for Merrimack College and an NBA scout for the Milwaukee Bucks.

== Playing career ==
Hammel attended Bentley University in 1969. He was a 3-year starter for the Falcons where he still ranks among the leaders in scoring and rebounding. He was later inducted into the Bentley Athletics Hall of Fame in 1990.

== Coaching career ==
After graduating from Bentley Hammel became an assistant coach for Merrimack college in 1974. During this time Hammel got to learn the ropes from Warriors head coach Frank Monahan. In 1979 Hammel decided to leave the Warriors to become a scout for the Milwaukee Bucks of the NBA. After one year of being a scout in the nba the head coaching job at Merrimack had opened up. So Hammel left the Bucks and returned to the Warriors now as the head man in charge. Hammel would see little success in his first four seasons. But during the 1984-85 there would be big changes for Hammel and the warriors as they would join the Northeast 10 conference. Hammel would lead the warriors to the NE10 semifinals in their first year in the league then finishing as runners up the following year. Following this the warriors would decline for the next 2 season. But then during the 1988–89 season Hammel would see his first truly great season. As the warriors would go 22-9 and be invited to the ECAC metro tournament. They would beat New York tech 102–78 in the semifinals. Before eventually beating Long Island-C.W. Post 98–85 to win the first championship in program history. Hammel would then hit a nice stretch in the early 90s. Bringing merrimack to their first NCAA tournament appearance in a decade in 1991 going 21–9. They would lose to Franklin pierce in the first round. Hammel would one up this the following year going as he would lead the warriors to their first conference championship. As the 6 seed the warriors would run the gauntlet beating AIC and Assumption in the quarter and semifinals. They would then beat St Anselm 92–77 in the championship game. Punching their ticket to the NCAA tournament for the second year in a row. After a declining for a few years. Hammel would win back to back ECAC tournaments in 1998 and 1999. He would then arguably have the best season of his career after in 1999–2000. Going 22–9 overall and 13–5 in conference securing the first regular season title in program history. He and the warriors would stop their though as they would go on to beat AIC 84–78 to win their second NE10. Making Hammels 3rd appearance In the 2000 NCAA tournament tournament. The warriors would win in the first round beat Saint Rose 92–64 before eventually losing to Adelphi in the second round. Hammel would then lead the warriors to 3 straight NCAA tournament appearances from 2008 to 2010. The furthest they would it was the round of 32. He ultimately retired after the 2015–2016 season and was replaced by Joe Gallo. Hammels run with the warriors lasted 36 seasons. He is the all-time wins leader in Merrimack basketball history with 526 wins.

== Legacy ==
Hammel made great contributions not just to Merrimack college but to the local basketball community as a whole, as he also played a part in the Lawrence Boys and Girls Club where he hosted numerous basketball camps. On top of this he would also establish the Academic Basketball Awareness (ABA) camp for the Boys Club kids who would not otherwise have the means to attend such as program. He also established the “Read with the Warriors” program, where Merrimack athletes traveled to elementary schools in the Merrimack Valley to help young children with reading.

For his contributions to the local community he honored twice by the City of Lawrence for his work, and received the 2000 UMass Amherst Sports Management Program Service Beyond Recognition Award for the ABA camp.

He was awarded the Paul Schoenfeld Sportsmanship Award twice during the 1996–97 and 2000–01 seasons, for showing good character, ethics and integrity in basketball.

In 2007 Hammel was given the Literacy Champion Award given by the National Association of Basketball Coaches for his program and players promoting education and selfless efforts.

He was honored by Merrimack college when they changed the name of their basketball gym to Hammel court after his death.

Following Hammel's death current Merrimack basketball coach Joe Gallo stated "Coach has touched and influenced so many lives over the last 40 years. I have never seen anyone that has the ability to light up a room like he did. He was larger than life and meant so much to so many people. He is a Hall of Fame coach, father, husband and friend."

== Personal life ==
Hammel was born to his parents Wilbert G. Hammel, Sr. and Eleanor, his brother Brian was also a college basketball coach, the two played together at Bentley.

Hammel was married to his wife Jill they had 3 children together and resided in Methuen Massachusetts.

Bert Hammel died on October 6, 2018, after suffering from a stroke.

== Head coaching results ==
Season	Team	Win	Loss	Conference standings/ Championship	Postseason
1980-81	Merrimack	12	15		
1981-82	Merrimack	17	10		
1982-83	Merrimack	13	14		
1983-84	Merrimack	14	13		
				NE10	
1984-85	Merrimack	11	17	6th place	NE10 Semifinal
1985-86	Merrimack	19	9	2nd place	NE10 Runner up
1986-87	Merrimack	13	16	3rd place	NE10 Semifinal
1987-88	Merrimack	9	19	9th place	NE10 first round
1988-89	Merrimack	22	9	3rd place	ECAC tournament champions (W New York tech 102–78) (W Long Island-C.W. Post 98–85)
1989-90	Merrimack	15	15	3rd place	NE10 Semifinal
1990-91	Merrimack	21	9	2nd place	NCAA Round of 32 ( L Franklin Pierce 82–79)
1991-92	Merrimack	18	14	6th place NE10 tournament Champion	NCAA Round of 32 (L Bridgeport 91–84)
1992-93	Merrimack	11	16	8th place	NE10 Quarterfinals
1993-94	Merrimack	11	17	9th place	NE10 Quarterfinals
1994-95	Merrimack	14	13	6th place	NE10 Quarterfinals
1995-96	Merrimack	12	16	6th place	NE10 Semifinals
1996-97	Merrimack	11	15	8th place	
1997-98	Merrimack	16	13	7th place	ECAC tournament champions (W U Albany 92–82) (W St Michaels 80–75)
1998-99	Merrimack	22	7	4th place	ECAC tournament champions (W U Albany 76–62) (W NJIT 96–82)
1999-00	Merrimack	22	9	1st place NE10 regular and tournament champion	NCAA Round of 32 ( W Saint Rose 92–64) ( L Adelphi90-64)
2000-01	Merrimack	13	15	9th place	NE10 Quarterfinals
2001-02	Merrimack	6	20	13th place	
2002-03	Merrimack	11	17	11th place	NE10 First round
2003-04	Merrimadk	17	12	9th place	NE10 First round
2004-05	Merrimack	14	15	10th place	NE10 Quarterfinals
2005-06	Merrimack	15	14	8th place	NE10 Quarterfinals
2006-07	Merrimack	8	20	12th place	NE10 First round
2007-08	Merrimack	17	12	6th place	NCAA round of 64 ( L Bentley 81–68)
2008-09	Merrimack	21	9	4th place	NCAA round of 32 ( W Umass Lowell 86–84) ( L Bentley 79–76)
2009-10	Merrimack	21	9	3rd place	NCAA round of 32 (W Umass Lowell 81–62) (L Bentley 83–79)
2010-11	Merrimack	13	14	10th place	NE10 First round
2011-12	Merrimack	15	12	5th place	NE10 Quarterfinals
2012-13	Merrimack	12	15	11th place	
2013-14	Merrimack	9	17	6th place	
2014-15	Merrimack	16	12	5th place	NE10 Quarterfinals
2015-16	Merrimack	15	12	7th place	
