= William S. LaRochelle =

American College basketball coach and Scout

Biographical details
- Born: March 3, 1927; Methuen, Massachusetts, U.S.
- Died: May 7, 2012 (aged 85); Thousand Oaks, California
- Education: Boston University Bates College

Coaching career (HC unless noted)
- 1958–1970: Merrimack College

Head coaching record
- Overall: 153-116(.569)

Accomplishments and honors

Championships
- MIAA State Championship 1958

Awards
- North Andover sports hall of fame

William LaRochelle was an American college basketball coach for Merrimack College.

== Early life ==
LaRochelle was born in Methuen Massachusetts, he attended Bates College and got a masters degree at Boston University. He then served in the U.S. Navy during World War II.

== Coaching career ==
After his service during the Second World War, LaRochelle began coaching the North Andover high school basketball team, which he led to the 1958 Massachusetts Class C State Championship. He was subsequently offered the head coaching position at Merrimack College.

In his first season as coach (1958–59), the program finished with 12 wins against 11 losses. This marked Merrimack College’s first-ever winning season. During the 1966–67 season, he led the Warriors to a school-record 17 wins and recorded his 100th victory as coach, becoming the first in program history to achieve this milestone. The 1969–70 season was his final at Merrimack.

In his 12 years at Merrimack, LaRochelle led the Warriors to nine winning seasons, with an overall record of 153–116. He held the Merrimack record for most coaching wins for 20 years until he was eventually surpassed by Bert Hammel during the 1990–91 season.

Later life

La Rochelle moved to California in 1983 and was involved in the local music scene and served as a golf instructor. He died on May 7, 2012 and survived by 3 of his 5 children and multiple grandchildren and grandchildren. He was later be inducted into the North Andover Sports Hall of Fame.

== Head coaching record ==
Team	Year	Wins	Loss	Postseason
Merrimack Warriors	1958-59	12	11	
Merrimack Warriors	1959-60	11	11	
Merrimack Warriors	1960-61	15	11	
Merrimack Warriors	1961-62	12	9	
Merrimack Warriors	1962-63	14	9	
Merrimack Warriors	1963-64	13	7	
Merrimack Warriors	1964-65	14	6	
Merrimack Warriors	1965-66	7	15	
Merrimack Warriors	1966-67	17	6	
Merrimack Warriors	1967-68	14	11	
Merrimack Warriors	1968-69	11	11	
Merrimack Warriors	1969-70	12	10	
	Total	153	116	

Note* Merrimack was not in a conference during this time
