= Joe Gallo (basketball) =

American college basketball head coach

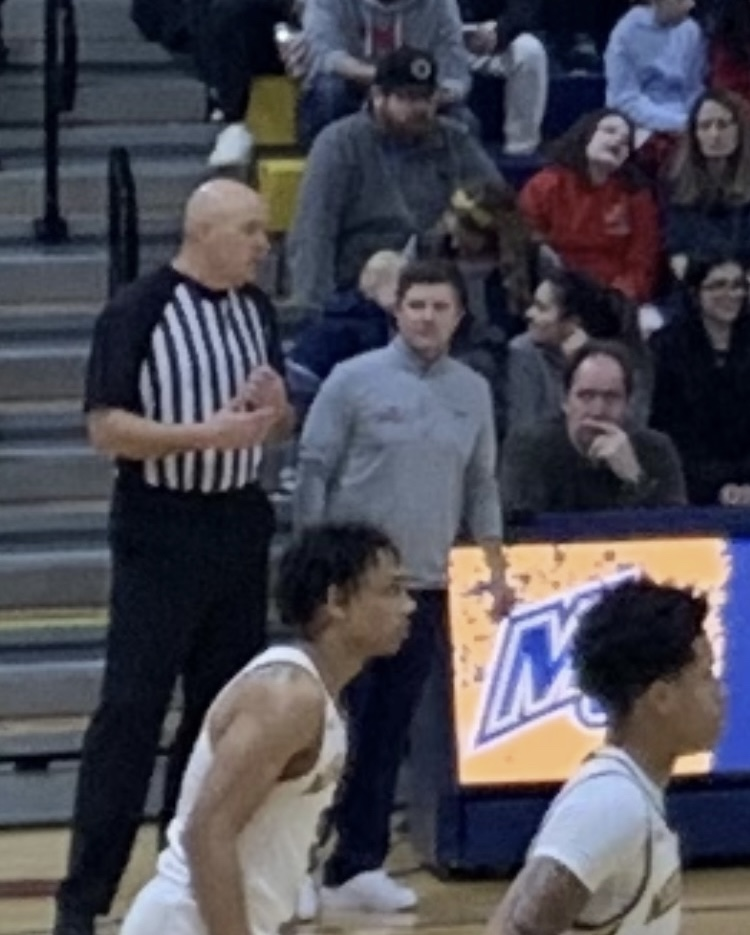
- Gallo to the right of the referee in 2025

Current position
- Title: Head coach
- Team: Merrimack
- Conference: MAAC
- Record: 185–128 (.591)

Biographical details
- Born: February 8, 1980 (age 46); New Brunswick, New Jersey, U.S.

Playing career
- 2000–2004: Merrimack
- Position: Guard

Coaching career (HC unless noted)
- 2005–2009: Merrimack (assistant)
- 2010–2012: Dartmouth (assistant)
- 2012–2016: Robert Morris (assistant)
- 2016–present: Merrimack

Head coaching record
- Overall: 185–128 (.591)
- Tournaments: 2–3 (NCAA Division II)

Accomplishments and honors

Championships
- Northeast-10 tournament (2019); 3 NEC regular season (2020, 2023, 2024); NEC tournament (2023); MAAC regular season (2026)

Awards
- NEC Coach of the Year (2020); MAAC Coach of the Year (2026); HoopDirt.com NCAA Div. 1 Coach of the Year (2020); John McLendon Award (2020); ECAC Coach of the Year (2020); 2x NABC District Coach of the Year (2020, 2023); USBWA District 1 Coach of the Year (2020)

Joe Gallo (born February 8, 1980) is an American college basketball head coach and former player who is the current head coach of the Merrimack Warriors men's basketball team. He was previously an assistant coach for Dartmouth and Robert Morris before he was hired as head coach at Merrimack in 2016.

== Playing career ==
Gallo, a native of Milltown, New Jersey, played high school basketball at Princeton Day School from 1995 to 1999, and won two NJISAA Prep State Championships in 1996 and 1999. After graduation he then played college basketball at Merrimack College from 2000 to 2004. While attending Merrimack Gallo earned a Bachelor of Science degree in business with a concentration in management.

== Coaching career ==
Gallo began his coaching career in 2005 as an assistant at Merrimack, one year after he finished playing for the Warriors. In 2010, Gallo was hired as an assistant under head coach Paul Cormier at Dartmouth before joining Andy Toole at Robert Morris 2012. In 2015, Gallo was a key component in helping the Colonials win the Northeast Conference tournament and reach the NCAA Tournament, where Robert Morris lost to eventual national champion Duke.

=== Merrimack College ===
The following year, Gallo was hired as head coach at his alma mater, Merrimack, replacing Bert Hammel. He led the Warriors to the NCAA Division II tournament in each of his first three years at the helm, and would also lead the program to its first Northeast-10 championship in 19 years during the 2018-19 season. He finished his time coaching at the Division II level with an overall record of 61-34 and a conference record of 40-23.

The Warriors transitioned to Division I in 2019, joining the Northeast Conference. Gallo led the team to their first ever win over a power 5 opponent on November 8, vs. Northwestern 71-61. He and the Warriors would set a record for most wins by a transitioning DI team in their first year as they went 20-11 overall. They went 14-4 in Northeast Conference play resulting in a regular season championship in 2020 in their first season a conference member. For his efforts Gallo received a plethora of coaching awards at the end of the season, including NEC Coach of the Year, HoopDirt.com NCAA Division I Coach of the Year, the John McLendon Award, ECAC Coach of the Year, NABC District Coach of the Year, and USBWA Coach of the Year. During the shorted 2020-21 season Gallo coached the Warriors to a 9-9 record.

During the 2021-22 season, Gallo earned his 100th career victory with a win over Wagner on February 12. That year he led the Warriors to 10-8 record in NEC play and a overall record of 14-6.

Gallo and the Warriors started off the 2022- 2023 season with an 3-14 record. However they went 12-3 during the second half of the year, finishing with a conference record of 12-4 to win their second NEC regular season championship. During the 2023 NEC tournament he and the Warriors defeated both LIU and Sacred Heart to reach the championship game, which Merrimack would win 67-66 over Fairleigh Dickinson marking their first and only NEC championship. However, Merrimack was ineligible to participate in the NCAA Tournament due to the five-year transition period having not completed (during the 2023 season Merrimack ended the season with the longest winning streak in the nation with 11 games). In March 2023 Gallo signed a longterm contract extension with Merrimack.

Gallo would lead Merrimack back to a second consecutive NEC regular season title in 2023-24 going 13-3 in conference play. During the 2024 NEC Tournament Gallo and the Warriors would defeat both LIU and Le Moyne to return to NEC championship game in, however they fell to Wagner, 54-47. This would be his last season coaching in the NEC, finishing with an overall record of 82-64 and a conference record 58-28.

In 2024, Merrimack moved to the Metro Atlantic Athletic Conference. Gallo led the Warriors to a second-place finish in their first year in the MAAC with a 14-6 conference record. They beat Sacred Heart 66-62 in the quarterfinals of 2025 MAAC Tournament before losing to Mount Saint Mary's in the MAAC semifinals 57-55. On March 27, 2025 it was announced Gallo had signed a 10 year contract extension with the Warriors.

During the 2025–26 season Gallo led the Warriors to a 17-3 record in MAAC play as they captured their first ever MAAC regular season championship. The Warriors also went a perfect 11-0 at home for the first time since the 1990-91 season. For his efforts Gallo was named MAAC Coach of the Year. During the 2026 MAAC men's basketball tournament the Warriors defeated Sacred Heart (70-48) and Marist (58-57) to advance to their first MAAC championship appearance. However he and the Warriors were defeated by Siena 64-54. The Warriors finished the year with a 23-11 record which is the most wins in single season in the history of the program.

== Personal life ==
Gallo married his wife, Megan, in 2015. The couple has two sons, Joey and Trey.

== Head coaching record ==
Record table
| Season | Team | Overall | Conference | Standing | Postseason |
|---|---|---|---|---|---|
Merrimack Warriors (Northeast-10 Conference) (2016–2019)
| 2016–17 | Merrimack | 19–12 | 12–9 | T–3rd (Northeast) | NCAA Division II Regional Semifinals |
| 2017–18 | Merrimack | 20–12 | 14–7 | 2nd (Northeast) | NCAA Division II Regional Semifinals |
| 2018–19 | Merrimack | 22–10 | 14–7 | 2nd (Northeast) | NCAA Division II First Round |
Merrimack Warriors (Northeast Conference) (2019–2024)
| 2019–20 | Merrimack | 20–11 | 14–4 | 1st | |
| 2020–21 | Merrimack | 9–9 | 9–9 | T–5th | |
| 2021–22 | Merrimack | 14–16 | 10–8 | 4th | |
| 2022–23 | Merrimack | 18–16 | 12–4 | 1st | |
| 2023–24 | Merrimack | 21–12 | 13–3 | T–1st | |
Merrimack Warriors (MAAC) (2024–2026)
| 2024–25 | Merrimack | 18–15 | 14–6 | 2nd | |
| 2025–26 | Merrimack | 23–11 | 17–3 | 1st | |
Merrimack Warriors (Metro Conference) (2026–present)
| 2026–27 | Merrimack | 1–4 | 0–0 | | |
| Merrimack: | | 185–128 (.591) | 129–60 (.683) | | |
| Total: | | 185–128 (.591) | | | |
National champion Postseason invitational champion Conference regular season champion Conference regular season and conference tournament champion Division regular season champion Division regular season and conference tournament champion Conference tournament champion
