= Juvaris Hayes =

American basketball player

Merrimack Warriors
- Title: Assistant coach
- League: MAAC

Personal information
- Born: February 8, 1998 (age 28) Paterson, New Jersey, U.S.
- Listed height: 6 ft 0 in (1.83 m)
- Listed weight: 195 lb (88 kg)

Career information
- High school: St. Anthony (Jersey City, New Jersey)
- College: Merrimack (2016–2020)
- NBA draft: 2020: undrafted
- Playing career: 2020–2023
- Position: Point guard
- Number: 2
- Coaching career: 2023–present

Career history

Playing
- 2020–2021: Tigers Tübingen
- 2021: Itzehoe Eagles
- 2022–2023: BC TSU Tbilisi

Coaching
- 2023–present: Merrimack (assistant)

Career highlights
- Lefty Driesell Award (2020); NEC Defensive Player of the Year (2020); First-team All-NEC (2020); NE10 Defensive Player of the Year (2019); 2× First-team All-NE10 (2018, 2019); Second-team All-NE10 (2017)

Juvaris K. Hayes (born February 8, 1998) is an American basketball coach for the Merrimack Warriors and former player. He played college basketball for Merrimack and professionally in Europe.

== Early life and high school ==
Hayes grew up in Paterson, New Jersey, and attended St. Anthony High School in Jersey City, New Jersey, where he played for Hall of Fame coach Bob Hurley. As a senior, Hayes helped lead the Friars to a 32–0 record and a win in the 2016 Tournament of Champions, the last state title of Hurley's career before St. Anthony closed in 2017.

== College career ==
As a true freshman, Hayes was named the Northeast-10 Conference (NE10) Rookie of the Year and second team All-NE10 after averaging 13.9 points and leading NCAA Division II with 9.3 assists. He was named first team All-NE10 after leading the team with 17.8 points, 5.8 rebounds and 8.0 assists per game and led the entire NCAA with 3.9 steals per game and 255 total assists and 124 total steals. As a junior, Hayes was again named first team All-NE10 and the conference Defensive Player of the Year after averaging 19.3 points, 6.6 assists, 6.8 rebounds, and 3.9 steals per game which led the nation for a second straight season.

Merrimack transitioned to NCAA Division I going into his senior season. Hayes broke the NCAA's career steals record for all divisions on February 23, 2020, against Mount Saint Mary's. Hayes finished the season averaging 10.7 points, 6.4 assists, 4.7 rebounds and was the nation's leader with 3.9 steals per game although, because of Merrimack's transition to Division 1, he was not recognized as Division I's steals leader. He was named first team Northeast Conference (NEC) as well as the NEC Defensive Player of the Year and received the Lefty Driesell Award as the nation's best defensive player. At the time of graduation, he held the program record for most assists in a season (287), ranked first in assist (952), first in steals (457), ranked fifth in career rebounds (741) and seventh in career points (1,951).

In 2026, he was inducted into the Merrimack Athletics Hall of Fame.

== Professional career ==
On August 20, 2020, Hayes signed with Tigers Tübingen of the German ProA. On July 19, 2021, he signed with Itzehoe Eagles, a team that had recently been promoted to the German ProA. Hayes averaged 4.0 points, 4.0 rebounds and 2.6 assists per game in 12 games. He parted ways with the team on December 21. On February 8, 2022, Hayes signed with BC TSU Tbilisi of the Georgian Superliga.

== Coaching career ==
Hayes retired from professional basketball was hired by Merrimack as an assistant coach on August 9, 2023.
