= Lefty Driesell Award =

College basketball award

- Awarded for: the top men's defensive player in NCAA Division I basketball
- Country: United States
- Presented by: Collegeinsider.com

History
- First award: 2010
- Most recent: Maliq Brown, Duke
- Website: Official website

The Lefty Driesell Defensive Player of the Year Award is an award given annually to the most outstanding men's college basketball defender in NCAA Division I competition. The award was established in 2010 and is named after head coach Lefty Driesell, who is the only head coach to amass 100 wins at four different Division I schools and is best remembered for his success with the Davidson Wildcats and Maryland Terrapins programs.

== Key ==
*	Awarded a national player of the year award that same season: Sporting News; Oscar Robertson Trophy; Associated Press; NABC; Naismith; Wooden
Player (X)	Denotes the number of times the player has been awarded the Lefty Driesell Award at that point

== Winners ==
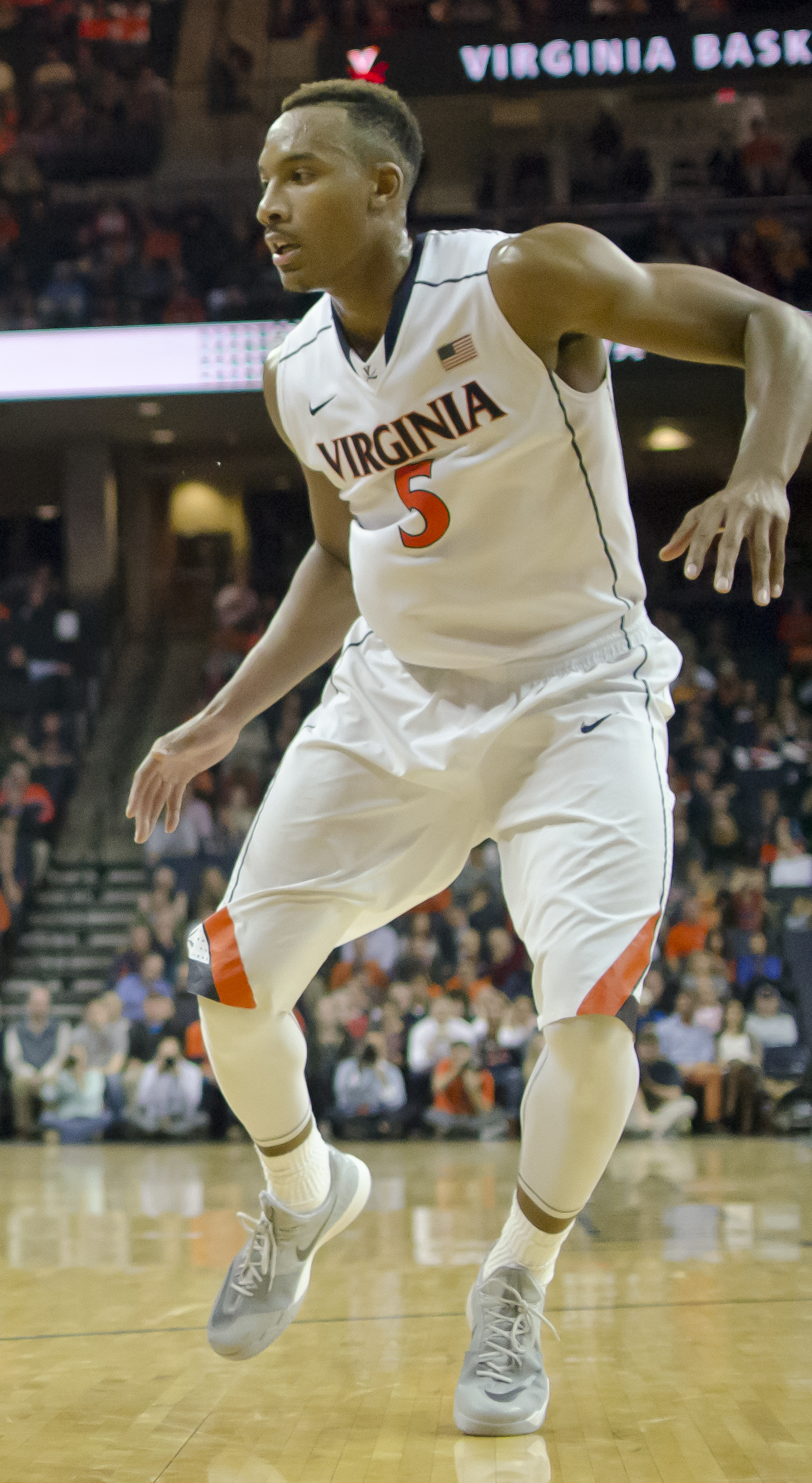
Darion Atkins, Virginia, 2015

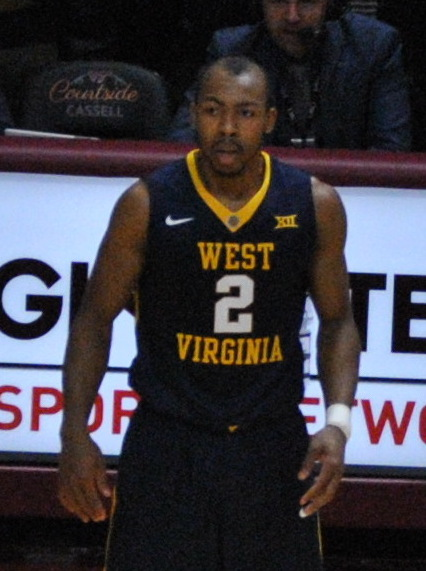
Jevon Carter, West Virginia, 2017 and 2018

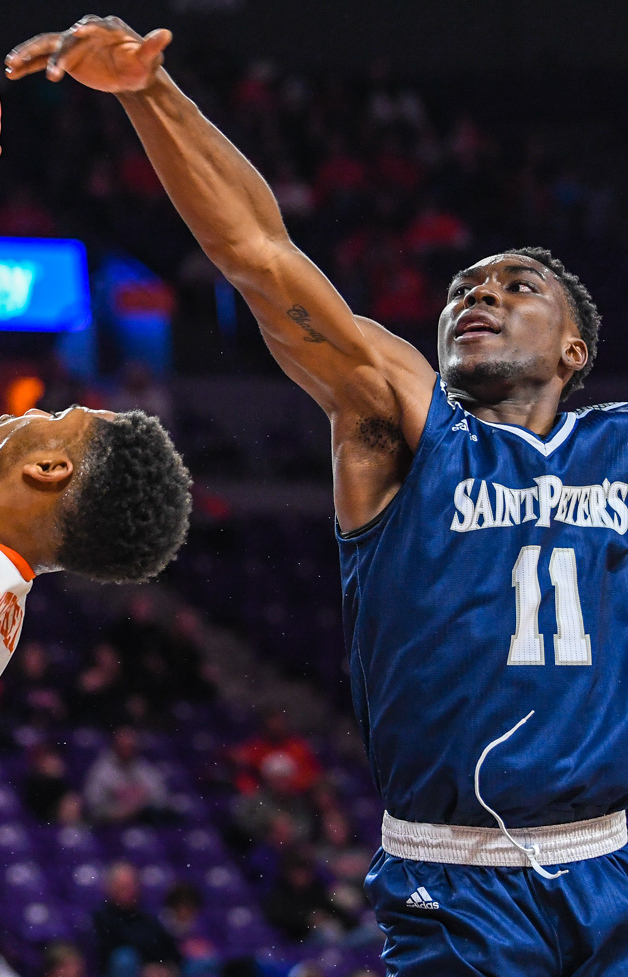
KC Ndefo, Saint Petere's, 2022

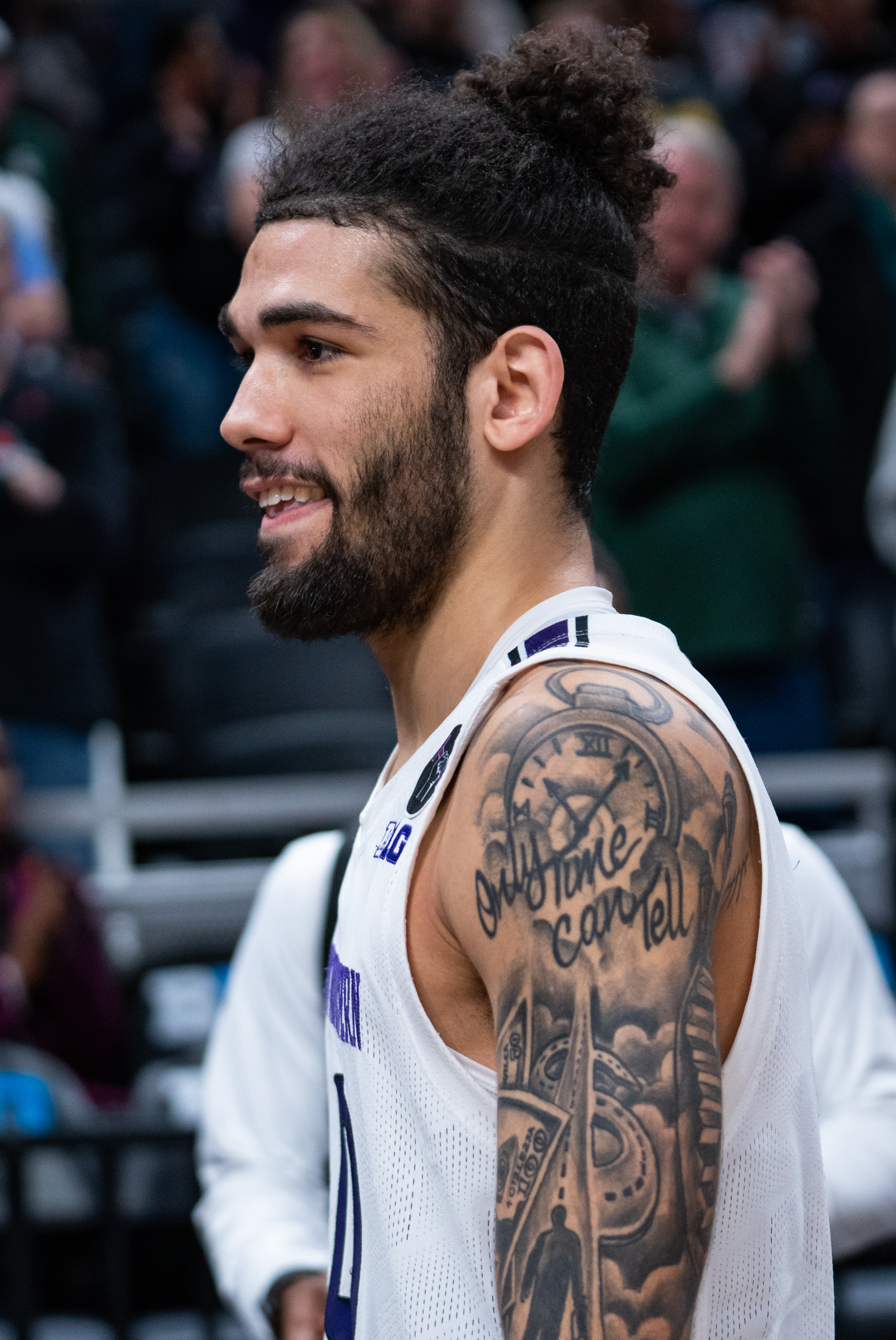
Boo Buie, Northwestern, 2024

Year	Player	School	Class	Reference
2009–10	Jarvis Varnado	Mississippi State	Senior	
2010–11	Kent Bazemore	Old Dominion	Junior	
2011–12	Anthony Davis*	Kentucky	Freshman	
2012–13	Tommy Brenton	Stony Brook	Senior	
2013–14	Elfrid Payton	Louisiana	Junior	
2014–15	Darion Atkins	Virginia	Senior	
2015–16	Vashil Fernandez	Valparaiso	Senior	
2016–17	Jevon Carter	West Virginia	Junior	
2017–18	Jevon Carter (2)	West Virginia	Senior	
2018–19	Matisse Thybulle	Washington	Senior	
2019–20	Juvaris Hayes	Merrimack	Senior	
2020–21	Davion Mitchell	Baylor	Junior	
2021–22	KC Ndefo	Saint Peter's	Senior	
2022–23	Caleb McConnell	Rutgers	Senior	
2023–24	Boo Buie	Northwestern	Graduate	
2024–25	Joseph Tugler	Houston	Sophomore	
2025–26	Maliq Brown	Duke	Senior	
