= Les Wothke =

American basketball coach

Biographical details
- Born: November 30, 1938; LaPorte County, Indiana, U.S.
- Died: November 16, 2022 (aged 83); Olathe, Kansas, U.S.

Playing career
- ?–1961: Greenville (IL)

Coaching career (HC unless noted)
- 1970–1975: Winona State
- 1975–1979: Illinois (assistant)
- 1979–1982: Western Michigan
- 1982–1990: Army
- 1992–1998: Winona State

Head coaching record
- Overall: 134–176

Accomplishments and honors

Championships
- 4 NSIC regular season (1972–1975); MAC regular season (1981)

Awards
- 3× NSIC Coach of the Year (1972, 1973, 1975); MAAC Coach of the Year (1985)

Leslie Leonard Wothke (November 30, 1938 – November 16, 2022) was an American college basketball coach. He served as head basketball coach for the Winona State University, Western Michigan University and United States Military Academy (Army) programs.

Wothke played at Greenville College in Illinois (now Greenville University), graduating in 1961. After beginning his coaching career at the high school level, he became head coach at National Association of Intercollegiate Athletics (NAIA) program Winona State in 1970. In his first tenure for the Warriors, he led the team to four consecutive Northern Sun Intercollegiate Conference (NSIC) regular season titles from 1972 to 1975.

His success caught the attention of new Illinois head coach Lou Henson, who offered Wothke an assistant coaching role for the NCAA Division I Fighting Illini. After four years under Henson, Wothke was given his first Division I head coaching role at Western Michigan. He spent three seasons at WMU, compiling a 42–41 record and winning a Mid-American Conference regular season championship in the 1980–81 season.

In 1982, Army athletic director Carl F. Ullrich (who had hired Wothke when at WMU) offered him the West Point head coaching position. In eight seasons at Army, Wothke compiled a 92–135 record and in the 1984–85 season was named the Metro Atlantic Athletic Conference Coach of the Year. He resigned in 1990.

Wothke returned to Winona State in 1992, coaching the Warriors for a second tenure. He coached the team for six seasons. His overall record at Winona State was 183–110 in eleven seasons.

Wothke died at age 83 on November 16, 2022, at his home in Olathe, Kansas.
