= Merrimack Athletics Complex =

Building in Massachusetts, United States

Coordinates: 42.667843°N 71.119995°W

- MAC
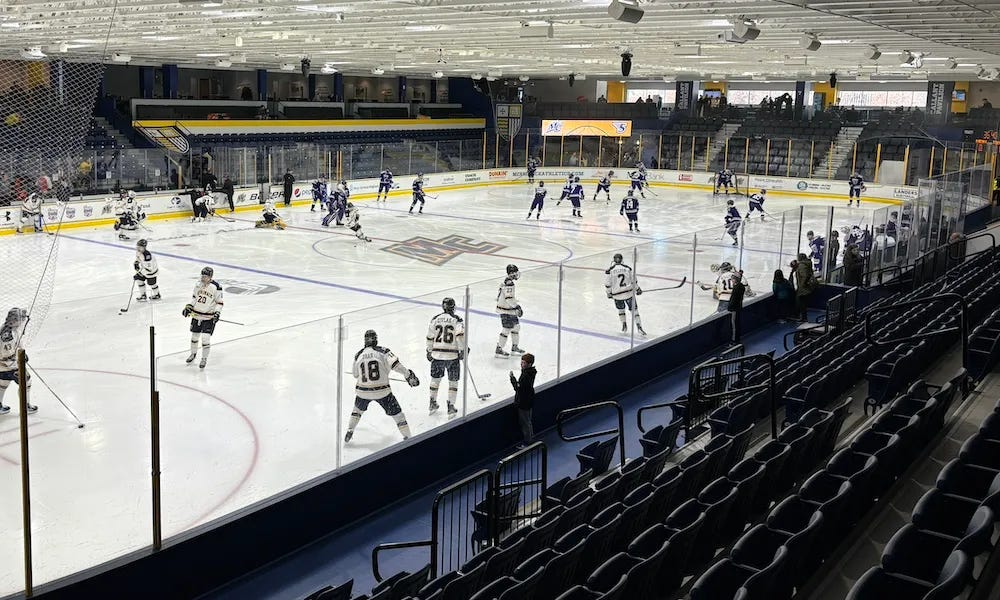
- Lawler Arena Post-Renovation 2024
- Interactive map of Merrimack Athletics Complex
- Location: North Andover, Massachusetts
- Owner: Merrimack College
- Operator: Merrimack College
- Capacity: 2,549 (hockey arena); 1,200 (basketball arena)
- Surface: 200 x 85 ft (hockey)

Construction
- Groundbreaking: 1972
- Opened: November 28, 1972
- Renovated: 2012-2013, 2023
- Cost: $2 million ($15.4 million in 2025 dollars)

Tenant
- Merrimack Warriors athletics

The Merrimack Athletics Complex is the home of the Merrimack College Warriors athletics teams. It has a basketball court and hockey arena. Hammel Court, located in the Volpe Athletic Center, is the home of the men's and women's basketball teams, as well as the volleyball team. Lawler Rink is the home of the Division I Merrimack Warriors men's ice hockey team, which had won the 1978 Division II national title before transitioning to Division I and joining the Hockey East Conference.

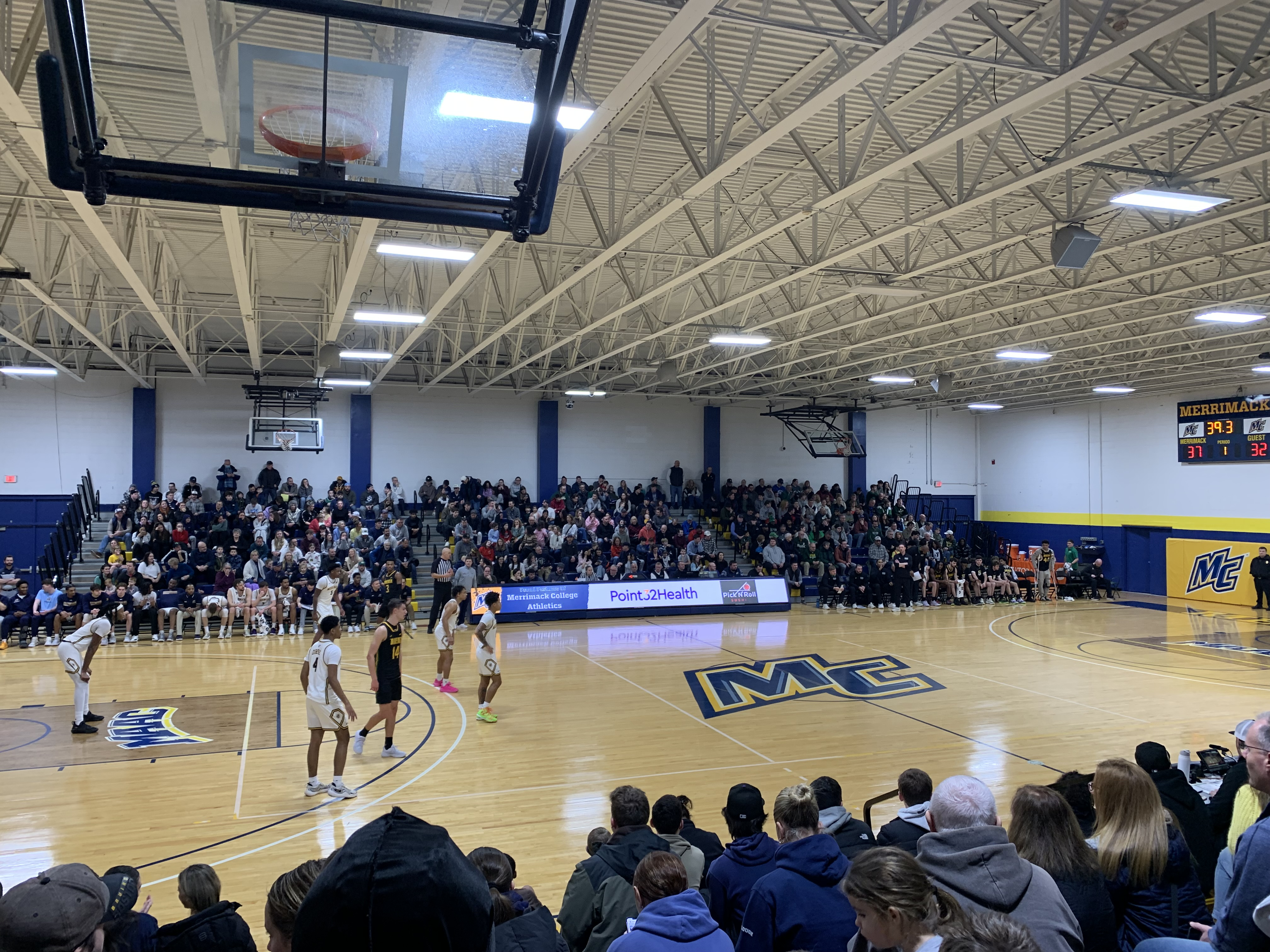
A game at Hammel court in 2025

The athletic center is named for S. Peter Volpe, a member of the college's Board of Trustees and benefactor. His construction company was responsible for the building of the McQuade Library on campus. His brother, John Volpe, was U.S. Secretary of Transportation under President Richard M. Nixon. The hockey arena is named for J. Thom Lawler, former coach of the men's hockey team who died in 1978 at age 44, just after leading the team to their first national title. The basketball/volleyball court is named after former men's basketball head coach Bert Hammel who was part of the program for 40+ years.

The complex also contains all athletic department offices, The Sports Medicine and Health Sciences Center, Academic Innovation Center, a Strength and Conditioning Center and the Merrimack Athletics Hall of Fame.

== Renovations ==
Over the summer and winter break of 2010, extensive renovation was done on the arena. The wooden bench seating was completely replaced with seatback chair seating and a student bleacher section was installed behind the visiting goalie's side. The "tin foil" insulation was removed from the roof as well. Seating capacity did decrease, however.

A major expansion was completed in 2013 that included a second ice rink, a franchise food location, and a campus bookstore.

A new scoreboard/jumbrotron was added prior to the 2022-23 season.

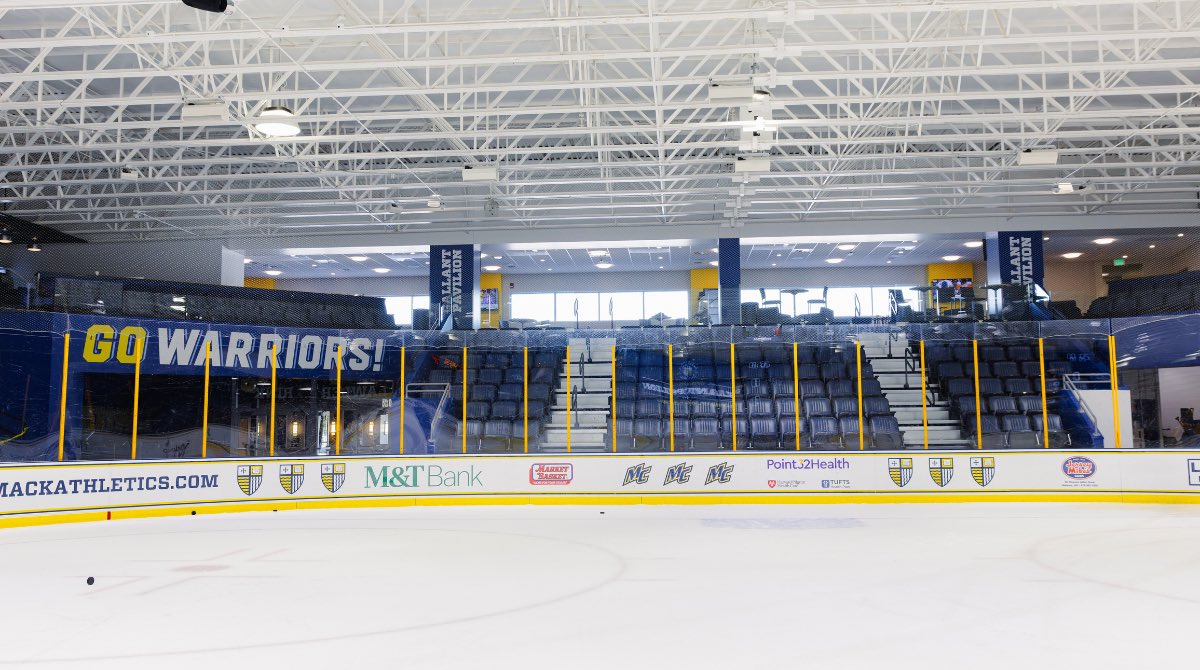
Gallant Pavilion Grand Opening in October 2023

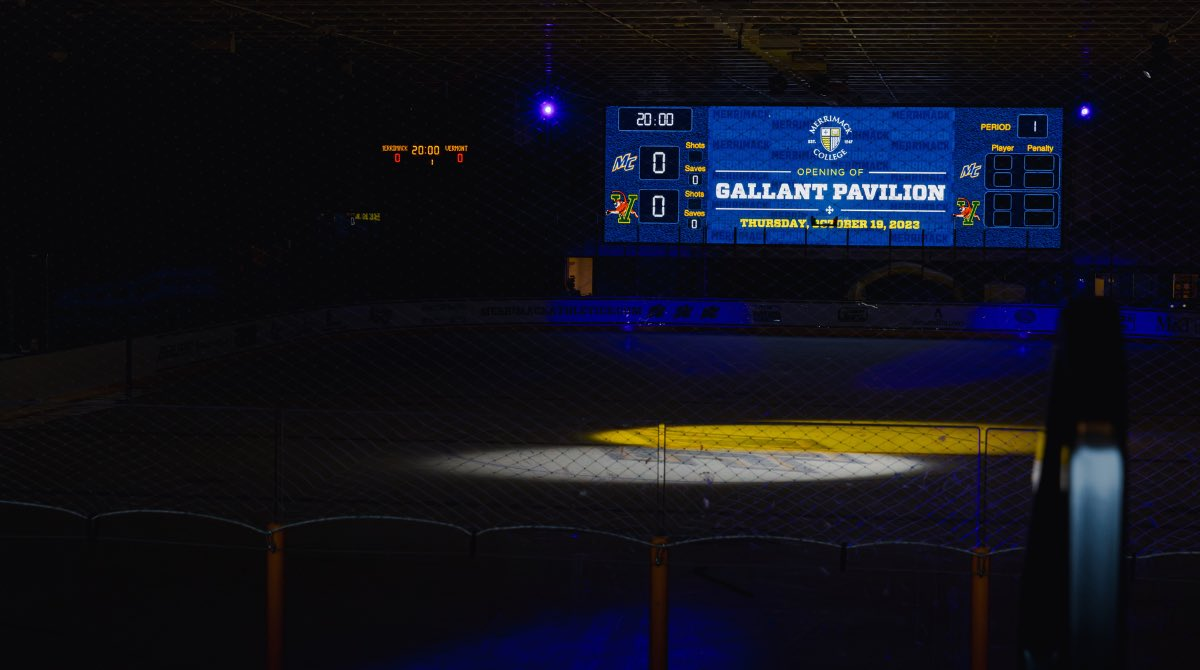
New scoreboard prior to Merrimack vs Vermont Men's Hockey game. The first game post-renovation and grand opening of the Gallant Pavilion in October 2023

Extensive renovations were also completed in the fall of 2023 including the addition of a brand new pavilion area. Funding was provided by Richard H’15 and Susanna Gallant.

== Lawler Basketball Configuration ==
Merrimack Men's Basketball played their first ever game at Lawler Arena during the 2021-22 season when they hosted Lehigh. Since then the arena has become a two-sport venue with the ability to change between hockey and basketball like many NHL/NBA arenas. The configuration ups the arena’s capacity from 2,549 to 3,000.

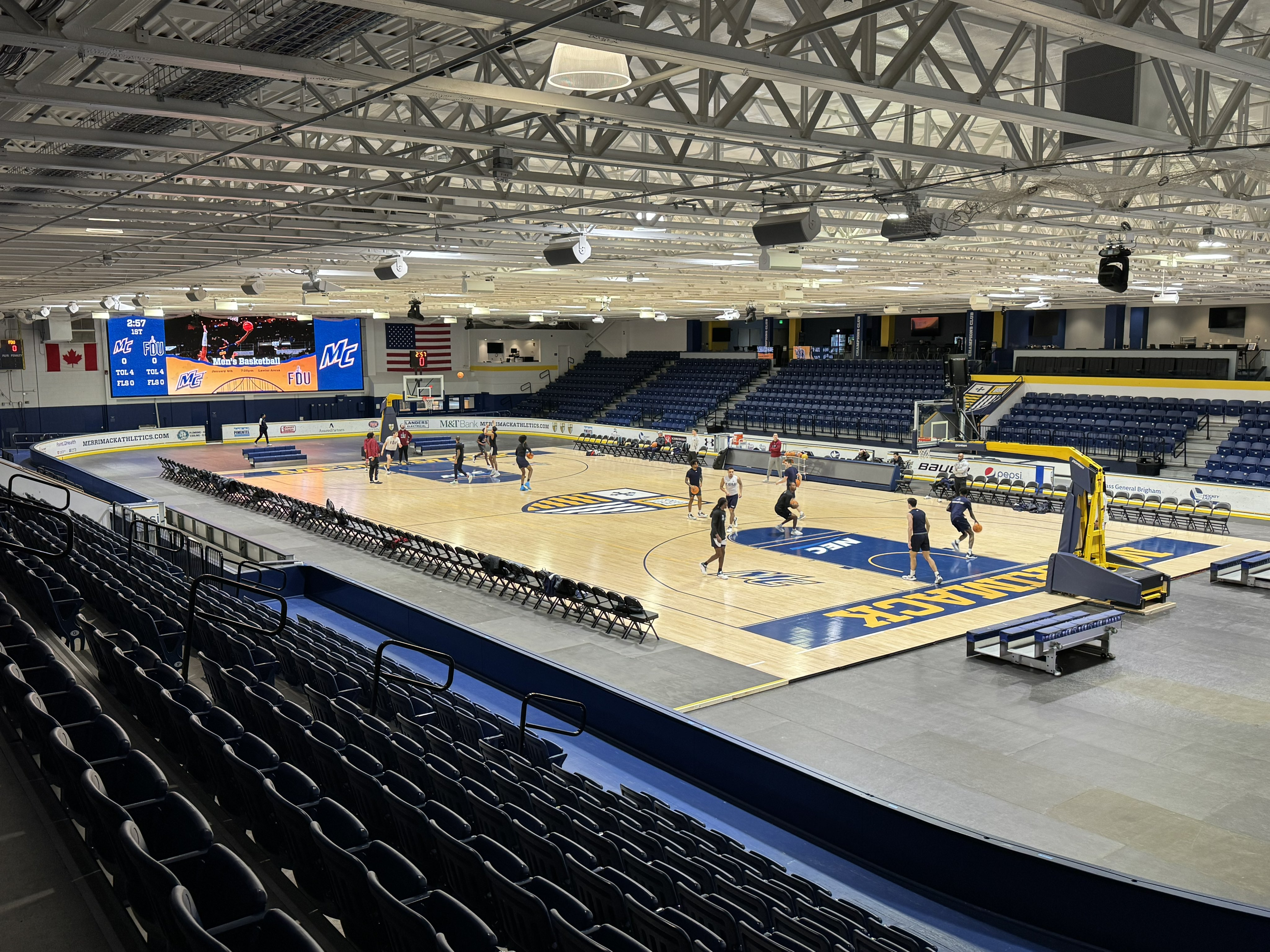
Merrimack vs FDU Basketball Jan 2024
