= 1991 NCAA Division II men's basketball tournament =

- Teams: 32
- Finals site: Springfield Civic Center, Springfield, Massachusetts
- Champions: North Alabama Lions (2nd title)
- Runner-up: Bridgeport Knights (1st title game)
- Semifinalists: Bakersfield State Roadrunners (4th Final Four); Virginia Union Panthers (2nd Final Four)
- Winning coach: Gary Elliott (1st title)
- MOP: Lambert Shell (Bridgeport)
- Attendance: 45,580

The 1991 NCAA Division II men's basketball tournament involved 32 schools playing in a single-elimination tournament to determine the national champion of men's NCAA Division II college basketball as a culmination of the 1990-91 NCAA Division II men's basketball season. It was won by the University of North Alabama and Bridgeport's Lambert Shell was the Most Outstanding Player.

1991 NCAA Division II Men's sites - regionals (cyan) Elite Eight (red)

== Regional participants ==
School	Outcome
Assumption	Fourth Place
Bridgeport	Regional Champion
Franklin Pierce	Runner-up
Merrimack	Third Place

School	Outcome
C.W. Post	Runner-up
Philadelphia U	Regional Champion
Shippensburg	Fourth Place
Slippery Rock	Third Place

School	Outcome
Central Missouri State	Runner-up
Kentucky Wesleyan	Third Place
Southwest Baptist	Regional Champion
West Texas State	Fourth Place

School	Outcome
Alaska–Anchorage	Runner-up
Cal State Bakersfield	Regional Champion
Chico State	Fourth Place
UC Riverside	Third Place

School	Outcome
Metro State	Third Place
Nebraska–Kearney	Fourth Place
North Dakota	Regional Champion
South Dakota State	Runner-up

School	Outcome
Johnson C. Smith	Third Place
Morehouse	Fourth Place
USC Spartanburg	Runner-up
Virginia Union	Regional Champion

School	Outcome
Hampton	Third Place
Florida Southern	Fourth Place
North Alabama	Regional Champion
Troy State	Runner-up

School	Outcome
Ashland	Regional Champion
Bellarmine	Third Place
Grand Valley State	Runner-up
Missouri Western State	Fourth Place

*denotes tie

== Regionals ==
=== New England - Worcester, Massachusetts ===
Location: Andrew Laska Gymnasium Host: Assumption College

Regional semifinals Round of 32; March 15
Franklin Pierce	82
Merrimack	79
Bridgeport	94
Assumption	87

Regional final Sweet 16; March 16
Franklin Pierce	77
Bridgeport	81

- Third Place - Merrimack 89, Assumption 71

=== East - Slippery Rock, Pennsylvania ===
Location: Morrow Field House Host: Slippery Rock University of Pennsylvania

Regional semifinals Round of 32; March 15
Philadelphia U	62
Shippensburg	50
C.W. Post	70
Slippery Rock	66

Regional final Sweet 16; March 16
Philadelphia U	64
C.W. Post	63

- Third Place - Slippery Rock 119, Shippensburg 101

=== South Central - Warrensburg, Missouri ===
Location: CMSU Fieldhouse Host: Central Missouri State University

Regional semifinals Round of 32; March 15
Southwest Baptist	98
Kentucky Wesleyan	81
Central Missouri State	72
West Texas State	69

Regional final Sweet 16; March 16
Southwest Baptist	63
Central Missouri State	61

- Third Place - Kentucky Wesleyan 91, West Texas State 78

=== West - Bakersfield, California ===
Location: CSUB Student Activities Center Host: California State University, Bakersfield

Regional semifinals Round of 32; March 15
Alaska–Anchorage	74
Chico State	69
Cal State Bakersfield	75
UC Riverside	62

Regional final Sweet 16; March 16
Alaska–Anchorage	68
Cal State Bakersfield	78

- Third Place - UC Riverside 90, Chico State 82

=== North Central - Grand Forks, North Dakota ===
Location: Hyslop Sports Center Host: University of North Dakota

Regional semifinals Round of 32; March 15
South Dakota State	92
Metro State	79
North Dakota	90
Nebraska–Kearney	60

Regional final Sweet 16; March 16
South Dakota State	51
North Dakota	54

- Third Place - Metro State 99, Nebraska–Kearney 92

=== South Atlantic - Charlotte, North Carolina ===
Location: Brayboy Gymnasium Host: Johnson C. Smith University

Regional semifinals Round of 32; March 15
Virginia Union	89
Morehouse	79
USC Spartanburg	99
Johnson C. Smith	74

Regional final Sweet 16; March 16
Virginia Union	77
USC Spartanburg	73

- Third Place - Johnson C. Smith 102, Morehouse 89

=== South - Troy, Alabama ===
Location: Sartain Hall Host: Troy State University

Regional semifinals Round of 32; March 15
North Alabama	94
Hampton	80
Troy State	78
Florida Southern	73

Regional final Sweet 16; March 16
North Alabama	93
Troy State	86

- Third Place - Hampton 70, Florida Southern 68

=== Great Lakes - Ashland, Ohio ===
Location: Kates Gymnasium Host: Ashland University

Regional semifinals Round of 32; March 15
Grand Valley State	78
Bellarmine	73
Ashland	103
Missouri Western State	72

Regional final Sweet 16; March 16
Grand Valley State	75
Ashland	82

- Third Place - Bellarmine 94, Missouri Western State 83

*denotes each overtime played

== Elite Eight - Springfield, Massachusetts ==
Location: Springfield Civic Center Hosts: American International College and Springfield College

National Quarterfinals; Elite Eight; March 21
Bridgeport	69
Philadelphia U	62
Southwest Baptist	52
Cal State Bakersfield	55
North Dakota	63
Virginia Union	64
North Alabama	92
Ashland	84

National semifinals Final Four; March 22
Bridgeport	73*
Cal State Bakersfield	66
Virginia Union	76
North Alabama	97

National championship March 23
Bridgeport	72
North Alabama	79

*denotes each overtime played

== All-tournament team ==
- Pat Morris (Bridgeport)
- Lambert Shell (Bridgeport)
- Fred Stafford (North Alabama)
- Allen Williams (North Alabama)
- Carl Wilmer (North Alabama)
