= 2023–24 Stonehill Skyhawks men's basketball team =

American college basketball season

2023–24 Stonehill Skyhawks men's basketball
- Conference: Northeast Conference
- Record: 4–27 (2–14 NEC)
- Head coach: Chris Kraus (11th season)
- Assistant coaches: Jimmy Langhurst; Herschel Jenkins; Jason Karys
- Home arena: Merkert Gymnasium

2023–24 Northeast Conference men's basketball standings
	Conf.				Overall
Team	W		L	PCT	W		L	PCT
Central Connecticut	13	–	3	.813	20	–	11	.645
Merrimack	13	–	3	.813	21	–	12	.636
Sacred Heart	10	–	6	.625	16	–	16	.500
Le Moyne*	9	–	7	.563	15	–	17	.469
Fairleigh Dickinson	9	–	7	.563	15	–	17	.469
Wagner †	7	–	9	.438	17	–	16	.515
LIU	6	–	10	.375	7	–	22	.241
Saint Francis	3	–	13	.188	8	–	22	.267
Stonehill*	2	–	14	.125	4	–	27	.129
† 2024 NEC tournament winner * ineligible for the 2024 NCAA tournament due to transition from Division II

The 2023–24 Stonehill Skyhawks men's basketball team represented Stonehill College during the 2023–24 NCAA Division I men's basketball season. The Skyhawks, led by 11th-year head coach Chris Kraus, played their home games at Merkert Gymnasium in Easton, Massachusetts as members of the Northeast Conference.

This season was Stonehill's second year of a four-year transition period from Division II to Division I. As a result, the Skyhawks are not eligible for NCAA postseason play until the 2026–27 season.

== Previous season ==
The Skyhawks finished the 2022–23 season 14–17, 10–6 in NEC play to finish in a tie for second place. Due to their transition to Division I, they were ineligible to participate in the NEC tournament.

== Preseason polls ==
=== Northeast Conference poll ===
The Northeast Conference released its preseason coaches' poll on October 24, 2023. The Skyhawks were picked to finish sixth in the conference.

Rank	Team
1.	Sacred Heart (7)
2.	Central Connecticut (1)
3.	Fairleigh Dickinson (1)
4.	Merrimack
5.	Wagner
6.	Stonehill
7.	LIU
8.	Saint Francis
9.	Le Moyne

() first-place votes

=== Ken Pom ranking ===
Stonehill was ranked 346th of 362 Division I teams in the preseason Pomeroy rankings.

=== Preseason All-Conference Team ===
Graduate student forward Max Zegarowski was selected as a member of the NEC Preseason All-Conference Team.

== Roster ==
2023–24 Stonehill Skyhawks men's basketball team
Players
Coaches

Pos.	#	Name	Height	Weight	Year	Previous school	Hometown
G	1	Austin Abrams	6 ft 4 in (1.93 m)	191 lb (87 kg)	Fr	Mount Saint Joseph High School	Ellicott City, Maryland
F	2	Max Zegarowski	6 ft 8 in (2.03 m)	205 lb (93 kg)	GS	Franklin Pierce	South Hamilton, Massachusetts
G	3	Jackson Benigni	6 ft 1 in (1.85 m)	180 lb (82 kg)	Sr	Hamden Hall Country Day School	East Hampton, Connecticut
G	4	Se'yphon Triplett	6 ft 0 in (1.83 m)	175 lb (79 kg)	Fr	Putnam Vocational Technical Academy	Springfield, Massachusetts
G	5	Chas Stinson	6 ft 4 in (1.93 m)	175 lb (79 kg)	So	Hickory Grove Christian School	Charlotte, North Carolina
G	10	Tony Felder	5 ft 10 in (1.78 m)	165 lb (75 kg)	So	VMI	Brockton, Massachusetts
G/F	11	Shane O'Dell	6 ft 6 in (1.98 m)	225 lb (102 kg)	Jr	Saint Rose	Schenectady, New York
G	12	Thatcher Stone	6 ft 6 in (1.98 m)	200 lb (91 kg)	Sr	William & Mary	Winchester, Massachusetts
G	13	Charlie Diamantis	6 ft 3 in (1.91 m)	165 lb (75 kg)	So	Joseph A. Foran High School	Milford, Connecticut
F	15	Louie Semona	6 ft 8 in (2.03 m)	205 lb (93 kg)	Fr	St. Thomas More School	Cincinnati, Ohio
G	20	Nathan McGill	6 ft 4 in (1.93 m)	190 lb (86 kg)	Jr	Northern High School	Dillsburg, Pennsylvania
F	21	Todd Brogna	6 ft 7 in (2.01 m)	220 lb (100 kg)	Fr	Worcester Academy	Southborough, Massachusetts
F	22	Pano Pavlidis	6 ft 8 in (2.03 m)	205 lb (93 kg)	Sr	Hartford	Queens, New York
F	23	Christopher Melis	6 ft 5 in (1.96 m)	205 lb (93 kg)	Jr	St. Thomas More School	Chappaqua, New York
G	30	Will Rywolt	5 ft 11 in (1.8 m)	165 lb (75 kg)	Sr	Barrington High School	Barrington, Rhode Island
G	33	Ethan Meuser	6 ft 8 in (2.03 m)	205 lb (93 kg)	So	The Hill School	Shavertown, Pennsylvania
F	34	Neal Marquardt	6 ft 5 in (1.96 m)	205 lb (93 kg)	Jr	Chaminade High School	Rockville Centre, New York

Head coach

- Chris Kraus (Stonehill)

Assistant coach(es)

- Jimmy Langhurst (Robert Morris)
- Herschel Jenkins (Staten Island)
- Jason Karys (Valparaiso)

Legend

- (C) Team captain
- (S) Suspended
- (I) Ineligible
- (W) Walk-on
- Injured
- Current redshirt

Roster
Last update: November 27, 2023

== Schedule and results ==
Date time, TV	Rank^{#}	Opponent^{#}	Result	Record	High points	High rebounds	High assists	Site (attendance) city, state
Non-conference regular season
November 6, 2023*; 8:00 pm, ESPN+		at George Washington	L 44–89	0–1	9 – Semona	9 – Zegarowski	3 – Stinson	Charles E. Smith Center (2,303); Washington, D.C.
November 9, 2023*; 7:00 pm, NEC Front Row		Army	W 57–44	1–1	21 – Zegarowski	8 – Zegarowski	5 – Felder	Merkert Gymnasium (1,157); Easton, MA
November 11, 2023*; 12:00 pm, FS2		at No. 6 UConn	L 67–107	1–2	22 – Benigni	4 – Pavlidis	5 – Felder	XL Center (14,606); Hartford, CT
November 14, 2023*; 7:00 pm, ESPN+		at Saint Joseph's; Wildcat Challenge	L 56–100	1–3	16 – O'Dell	4 – O'Dell	2 – 2 Tied	Hagan Arena (1,734); Philadelphia, PA
November 17, 2023*; 7:00 pm, SECN+/ESPN+		at No. 17 Kentucky; Wildcat Challenge	L 67–101	1–4	15 – 2 Tied	4 – 2 Tied	4 – Felder	Rupp Arena (18,960); Lexington, KY
November 20, 2023*; 8:00 pm, ESPN+		at Texas A&M–Commerce; Wildcat Challenge	L 86–97	1–5	24 – Felder	6 – 2 Tied	4 – Felder	University Field House (443); Commerce, TX
November 26, 2023*; 2:00 pm, ESPN+		at Quinnipiac	L 69–80	1–6	18 – 2 Tied	5 – Benigni	7 – Felder	M&T Bank Arena (877); Hamden, CT
November 29, 2023*; 4:30 pm, NEC Front Row		UMass Lowell	L 74–80	1–7	21 – Benigni	8 – Pavlidis	3 – 2 Tied	Merkert Gymnasium (759); Easton, MA
December 2, 2023*; 2:00 pm, NEC Front Row		Binghamton	L 64–79	1–8	20 – Zegarowski	8 – Pavlidis	4 – Pavlidis	Merkert Gymnasium (725); Easton, MA
December 6, 2023*; 6:31 pm, FloHoops		at Stony Brook	L 63–81	1–9	11 – Felder	6 – 2 Tied	4 – Zegarowski	Island Federal Arena (1,592); Stony Brook, NY
December 8, 2023*; 7:00 pm, ESPN+		at Rider	L 56–73	1–10	16 – Zegarowski	8 – Brogna	2 – 3 Tied	Alumni Gymnasium (1,650); Lawrenceville, NJ
December 11, 2023*; 7:00 pm, ESPN+		at New Hampshire	L 62–75	1–11	18 – Zegarowski	11 – Stinson	4 – Stinson	Lundholm Gym (410); Durham, NH
December 17, 2023*; 2:00 pm, NEC Front Row		Hartford	W 71–44	2–11	15 – 2 Tied	6 – 2 Tied	4 – Felder	Merkert Gymnasium (344); Easton, MA
December 21, 2023*; 8:00 pm, ACCN		at Miami (FL)	L 59–97	2–12	22 – Felder	4 – 4 Tied	2 – 4 Tied	Watsco Center (5,616); Coral Gables, FL
December 30, 2023*; 12:00 pm, B1G		at Rutgers	L 58–59	2–13	23 – Stinson	12 – Stinson	2 – 5 Tied	Jersey Mike's Arena (8,000); Piscataway, NJ
NEC regular season
January 4, 2024; 7:00 pm, NEC Front Row		Central Connecticut	L 59–74	2–14 (0–1)	17 – Stinson	8 – Stinson	4 – Stone	Merkert Gymnasium (230); Easton, MA
January 6, 2024; 2:00 pm, NEC Front Row		LIU	L 68–73	2–15 (0–2)	18 – Zegarowski	5 – 2 Tied	2 – 3 Tied	Merkert Gymnasium (340); Easton, MA
January 13, 2024; 2:00 pm, YES/NEC Front Row		at Fairleigh Dickinson	L 74–81	2–16 (0–3)	16 – Benigni	7 – Pavlidis	3 – 2 Tied	Bogota Savings Bank Center (223); Hackensack, NJ
January 15, 2024; 1:00 pm, NEC Front Row		at Wagner	L 54–64	2–17 (0–4)	11 – 2 Tied	7 – Stinson	3 – Zegarowski	Spiro Sports Center (972); Staten Island, NY
January 19, 2024; 7:00 pm, NEC Front Row		Fairleigh Dickinson	L 69–76	2–18 (0–5)	27 – Benigni	8 – Zegarowski	5 – Felder	Merkert Gymnasium (1,493); Easton, MA
January 21, 2024; 2:00 pm, NEC Front Row		at Merrimack	L 47–63	2–19 (0–6)	9 – 2 Tied	9 – Zegarowski	5 – Zegarowski	Hammel Court (861); North Andover, MA
January 25, 2024; 7:00 pm, NEC Front Row		at LIU	L 60–63	2–20 (0–7)	12 – 2 Tied	7 – Zegarowski	5 – Brogna	Steinberg Wellness Center (534); Brooklyn, NY
February 1, 2024; 7:00 pm, NEC Front Row		at Sacred Heart	L 72–77	2–21 (0–8)	20 – Felder	8 – Pavlidis	5 – Zegarowski	William H. Pitt Center (480); Fairfield, CT
February 3, 2024; 2:00 pm, NEC Front Row		Wagner	W 71–61	3–21 (1–8)	20 – Zegarowski	8 – Felder	4 – Felder	Merkert Gymnasium (1,025); Easton, MA
February 8, 2024; 7:00 pm, NEC Front Row		Le Moyne	L 57–88	3–22 (1–9)	9 – 2 Tied	6 – Semona	4 – Semona	Merkert Gymnasium (571); Easton, MA
February 10, 2024; 4:00 pm, NEC Front Row		at Saint Francis	L 63–72	3–23 (1–10)	13 – Semona	7 – Pavlidis	3 – Felder	DeGol Arena (809); Loretto, PA
February 15, 2024; 7:00 pm, NEC Front Row		Merrimack	L 63–66	3–24 (1–11)	19 – Zegarowski	8 – 2 Tied	10 – Brogna	Merkert Gymnasium (820); Easton, MA
February 17, 2024; 2:00 pm, NEC Front Row		at Le Moyne	L 67–75	3–25 (1–12)	14 – Felder	9 – Zegarowski	3 – 2 Tied	Ted Grant Court (957); DeWitt, NY
February 24, 2024; 2:00 pm, NEC Front Row		Saint Francis	W 72–63	4–25 (2–12)	30 – Felder	9 – Pavlidis	3 – 2 Tied	Merkert Gymnasium (1,022); Easton, MA
February 29, 2024; 7:00 pm, NEC Front Row		Sacred Heart	L 51–79	4–26 (2–13)	14 – Zegarowski	7 – 2 Tied	2 – 3 Tied	Merkert Gymnasium (807); Easton, MA
March 2, 2024; 1:00 pm, NEC Front Row		at Central Connecticut	L 67–79	4–27 (2–14)	19 – Zegarowski	8 – Brogna	5 – Brogna	William H. Detrick Gymnasium (1,631); New Britain, CT
*Non-conference game. ^{#}Rankings from AP poll. (#) Tournament seedings in parentheses. All times are in Eastern.
