= 2023–24 UCLA Bruins men's basketball team =

American college basketball season

2023–24 UCLA Bruins men's basketball
- Conference: Pac-12 Conference
- Record: 16–17 (10–10 Pac-12)
- Head coach: Mick Cronin (5th season)
- Associate head coach: Darren Savino (5th season)
- Assistant coaches: Rod Palmer (5th season); Nate Georgeton (1st season); Nemanja Jovanovic (1st season); Brendyn Taylor (1st season)
- Home arena: Pauley Pavilion (Capacity: 13,819)

2023–24 Pac-12 Conference men's basketball standings
	Conf.				Overall
Team	W		L	PCT	W		L	PCT
No. 11 Arizona	15	–	5	.750	27	–	9	.750
No. 23 Washington State	14	–	6	.700	25	–	10	.714
Colorado	13	–	7	.650	26	–	11	.703
Oregon †	12	–	8	.600	24	–	12	.667
UCLA	10	–	10	.500	16	–	17	.485
Utah	9	–	11	.450	22	–	15	.595
California	9	–	11	.450	13	–	19	.406
Washington	9	–	11	.450	17	–	15	.531
USC	8	–	12	.400	15	–	18	.455
Stanford	8	–	12	.400	14	–	18	.438
Arizona State	8	–	12	.400	14	–	18	.438
Oregon State	5	–	15	.250	13	–	19	.406
† 2024 Pac-12 tournament winner Rankings from AP Poll

The 2023–24 UCLA Bruins men's basketball team represented the University of California, Los Angeles during the 2023–24 NCAA Division I men's basketball season. The Bruins were led by fifth-year head coach Mick Cronin, and they played their home games at Pauley Pavilion as a member of the Pac-12 Conference. It was the Bruins' final season as a member of the Pac-12 before joining the Big Ten Conference on July 1, 2024.

UCLA had seven freshmen on their roster, and eight newcomers overall, along with three sophomores. The Bruins won their first three games and started the season 5–2. The team was limited offensively. On January 11, 2024, they lost 90–44 to Utah for their eighth loss in nine games. The 46-point defeat was the second-worst in the program's history, behind a 48-point loss (109–61) to Stanford in 1997. On January 27, UCLA defeated USC 65–50 at the Galen Center. It was the Bruins' first win in their crosstown rivalry under Cronin on the Trojans' home court, ending a five-game losing streak at the site. For the first time since 2004, the teams faced each other both with losing records. UCLA beat Oregon 71–63, dropping the Ducks to second place, for their third straight win and fifth in their last six games. They extended their winning streak to six games, and had won eight of their last nine, leading up to their rematch against Utah. However, the Bruins lost 70–69 to the Utes on a last-second basket. They also lost their following game to USC to fall to 14–13 overall and 9–7 in the conference, needing to win the Pac-12 tournament to advance to the NCAA tournament. UCLA lost their third game in a row, dropping back to .500 after allowing a season high in points in a 94–77 defeat to Washington. The Bruins won their regular-season finale 59–47 at home against Arizona State to end a five-game losing streak, including three at Pauley Pavilion.

In their Pac-12 tournament opener, Dylan Andrews scored a career-high 31 points to lead No. 5-seed UCLA to a 67–57 win over 12th-seeded Oregon State. The Bruins were eliminated in the following game in the quarterfinals, losing 68–66 to No. 4-seed Oregon. With 4.4 seconds remaining, Andrews took the inbounds pass, drove downcourt, and shot a floater inside the free throw line over N'Faly Dante as the buzzer sounded, but the ball bounced off the back of the rim. He ended the game with 24 points, and averaged 21.2 points over the final six games. Cronin's personal streak of 12 consecutive NCAA tournament appearances ended.

== Offseason ==
UCLA Departures
Name	Pos.	Height	Weight	Year	Hometown	Reason for Departure
Tyger Campbell	G	5'11"	180	RS Senior	Cedar Rapids, IA	Graduated; Declared for the 2023 NBA Draft
Jaime Jaquez Jr.	G/F	6'7"	225	Senior	Camarillo, CA	Graduated; Declared for the 2023 NBA Draft
David Singleton	G	6'4"	205	Senior	Los Angeles, CA	Graduated
Russell Stong	G	6'3"	190	Senior	Northridge, CA	Walk-on; Graduated
Jaylen Clark	G	6'5"	210	Junior	Riverside, CA	Declared for the 2023 NBA Draft
Mac Etienne	F	6'10"	230	RS Freshman	New York, NY	Transferred to DePaul
Abramo Canka	G/F	6'6"	200	Freshman	Genoa, Italy	Transferred to Wake Forest
Amari Bailey	G	6'5"	185	Freshman	Chicago, IL	Declared for the 2023 NBA Draft

Incoming transfers
Name	Pos.	Height	Weight	Year	Hometown	Notes
Lazar Stefanović	G	6'7"	190	Sophomore	Belgrade, Serbia	Transfer from Utah. Will have two years of eligibility remaining.

=== 2023 recruiting class ===
College recruiting information
Name	Hometown	School	Height	Weight	Commit date
Sebastian Mack; SG	Henderson, NV	Coronado HS (NV)	6 ft 2 in (1.88 m)	180 lb (82 kg)	Nov 16, 2022
Sebastian Mack; SG	Recruit ratings: Rivals: 247Sports: ESPN:				
Brandon Williams; PF	Middle Village, NY	Christ The King HS (NY)	6 ft 8 in (2.03 m)	220 lb (100 kg)	Sep 20, 2022
Brandon Williams; PF	Recruit ratings: Rivals: 247Sports: ESPN:				
Devin Williams; PF	Corona, CA	Centennial HS (CA)	6 ft 10 in (2.08 m)	200 lb (91 kg)	Aug 28, 2022
Devin Williams; PF	Recruit ratings: Rivals: 247Sports: ESPN:				
Overall recruit ranking:
Note: In many cases, Scout, Rivals, 247Sports, On3, and ESPN may conflict in their listings of height and weight.; In these cases, the average was taken. ESPN grades are on a 100-point scale.; Sources: "UCLA 2023 Basketball Commitments". Rivals.; "2023 Team Ranking". Rivals.

== Roster ==
2023–24 UCLA Bruins men's basketball team
Players
Coaches

Pos.	#	Name	Height	Weight	Year	Previous school	Hometown
G	2	Dylan Andrews	6 ft 2 in (1.88 m)	180 lb (82 kg)	So	Compass Prep	Gardena, CA
F	3	Adem Bona	6 ft 10 in (2.08 m)	245 lb (111 kg)	So	Prolific Prep	Ebonyi, Nigeria
G	4	Will McClendon	6 ft 3 in (1.91 m)	205 lb (93 kg)	RS So	Bishop Gorman HS	Las Vegas, NV
G/F	5	Brandon Williams	6 ft 7 in (2.01 m)	220 lb (100 kg)	Fr	Christ the King HS	Queens, NY
G	8	Ilane Fibleuil	6 ft 6 in (1.98 m)	200 lb (91 kg)	Fr	INSEP	Massy, France
F	9	Berke Büyüktuncel	6 ft 9 in (2.06 m)	245 lb (111 kg)	Fr	Ozluce Doga Kolegi	Bursa, Turkey
G	10	Lazar Stefanović	6 ft 7 in (2.01 m)	190 lb (86 kg)	Jr	Utah	Belgrade, Serbia
G	12	Sebastian Mack	6 ft 3 in (1.91 m)	200 lb (91 kg)	Fr	Coronado HS	Chicago, IL
F/C	14	Kenneth Nwuba	6 ft 10 in (2.08 m)	255 lb (116 kg)	RS Sr	Huntington Prep	Lagos, Nigeria
C	15	Aday Mara	7 ft 3 in (2.21 m)	240 lb (109 kg)	Fr	IES El Picarral	Zaragoza, Spain
F	20	Logan Cremonesi (W)	6 ft 8 in (2.03 m)	225 lb (102 kg)	RS Jr	Mater Dei HS	Oceanside, CA
F	21	Evan Manjikian (W) (redshirt)	6 ft 8 in (2.03 m)	245 lb (111 kg)	So	Sierra Canyon	Glendale, CA
F	22	Devin Williams	6 ft 10 in (2.08 m)	200 lb (91 kg)	Fr	Centennial HS	Riverside, CA
G	27	Jan Vide	6 ft 6 in (1.98 m)	200 lb (91 kg)	Fr	SEK El Castillo	Domžale, Slovenia
G	30	Jack Seidler (W)	6 ft 4 in (1.93 m)	200 lb (91 kg)	RS Fr	Marlboro HS	Marlboro, NJ

Head coach

- Mick Cronin (Cincinnati)

Assistant coach(es)

- Darren Savino (New Jersey City)
- Rod Palmer (UC Irvine)
- Nate Georgeton (Cincinnati)

Legend

- (C) Team captain
- (S) Suspended
- (I) Ineligible
- (W) Walk-on
- Injured
- Current redshirt

Roster

== Schedule and results ==
Date time, TV	Rank^{#}	Opponent^{#}	Result	Record	High points	High rebounds	High assists	Site (attendance) city, state
Exhibition
October 31, 2023*; 6:00 p.m.		Cal State Dominguez Hills	W 97–56	0–0	23 – Mack	10 – Fibleuil	7 – Mack	Pauley Pavilion (2,968); Los Angeles, CA
Non-conference regular season
November 6, 2023*; 8:30 p.m., P12N		Saint Francis (PA)	W 75–44	1–0	28 – Bona	9 – Bona	4 – Stefanović	Pauley Pavilion (6,783); Los Angeles, CA
November 10, 2023*; 8:00 p.m., P12N		Lafayette	W 68–50	2–0	18 – Tied	6 – Bona	4 – Andrews	Pauley Pavilion (6,259); Los Angeles, CA
November 15, 2023*; 7:00 p.m., P12N		LIU	W 78–58	3–0	20 – Bona	11 – Bona	7 – Vide	Pauley Pavilion (4,751); Los Angeles, CA
November 20, 2023*; 8:30 p.m., ESPN2		vs. No. 4 Marquette; Maui Invitational quarterfinals	L 69–71	3–1	25 – Mack	8 – Stefanović	4 – Andrews	Stan Sheriff Center (4,936); Honolulu, HI
November 21, 2023*; 2:00 p.m., ESPN2		vs. Chaminade; Maui Invitational Consolation 2nd round	W 76–48	4–1	16 – Mack	10 – Mara	6 – Andrews	Stan Sheriff Center (3,602); Honolulu, HI
November 22, 2023*; 9:00 p.m., ESPN2		vs. No. 11 Gonzaga; Maui Invitational 5th Place Game	L 65–69	4–2	16 – Tied	8 – Tied	4 – Andrews	Stan Sheriff Center (3,757); Honolulu, HI
November 30, 2023*; 8:00 p.m., P12N		UC Riverside	W 66–65	5–2	17 – Andrews	5 – Mack	5 – Tied	Pauley Pavilion (6,609); Los Angeles, CA
December 9, 2023*; 4:00 p.m., FOX		at Villanova	L 56–65	5–3	14 – Stefanović	8 – Bona	4 – Andrews	Wells Fargo Center (16,823); Philadelphia, PA
December 16, 2023*; 12:00 p.m., CBS		vs. Ohio State; CBS Sports Classic	L 60–67	5–4	14 – Mack	6 – Tied	3 – Andrews	State Farm Arena (17,058); Atlanta, GA
December 19, 2023*; 7:00 p.m., P12N		Cal State Northridge	L 72–76	5–5	27 – Mack	10 – Bona	3 – Mara	Pauley Pavilion (7,274); Los Angeles, CA
December 22, 2023*; 6:00 p.m., ESPN2		Maryland	L 60–69	5–6	17 – Mack	6 – Stefanović	3 – Tied	Pauley Pavilion (7,056); Los Angeles, CA
Pac-12 regular season
December 28, 2023; 7:00 p.m., P12N		at Oregon State	W 69–62	6–6 (1–0)	13 – Tied	8 – Bona	4 – Andrews	Gill Coliseum (3,087); Corvallis, OR
December 30, 2023; 1:00 p.m., CBS		at Oregon	L 59–64	6–7 (1–1)	15 – Bona	11 – Bona	6 – Andrews	Matthew Knight Arena (7,268); Eugene, OR
January 3, 2024; 6:00 p.m., ESPN2		Stanford	L 53–59	6–8 (1–2)	14 – Mack	9 – Bona	2 – Tied	Pauley Pavilion (6,224); Los Angeles, CA
January 6, 2024; 7:00 p.m., P12N		California	L 57–66	6–9 (1–3)	20 – Mack	6 – Tied	2 – Tied	Pauley Pavilion (7,342); Los Angeles, CA
January 11, 2024; 6:00 p.m., ESPN2		at Utah	L 44–90	6–10 (1–4)	9 – Andrews	5 – Mack	2 – Andrews	Jon M. Huntsman Center (8,934); Salt Lake City, UT
January 14, 2024; 4:00 p.m., P12N		Washington	W 73–61	7–10 (2–4)	22 – Bona	7 – Stefanović	8 – Andrews	Pauley Pavilion (6,532); Los Angeles, CA
January 17, 2024; 6:00 p.m., P12N		at Arizona State	W 68–66	8–10 (3–4)	18 – Stefanović	6 – Tied	5 – Bona	Desert Financial Arena (10,096); Tempe, AZ
January 20, 2024; 1:00 p.m., ESPN2		at No. 12 Arizona; Rivalry	L 71–77	8–11 (3–5)	21 – Mack	8 – Stefanović	4 – Mack	McKale Center (14,688); Tucson, AZ
January 27, 2024; 5:00 p.m., ESPN2		at USC; Rivalry	W 65–50	9–11 (4–5)	20 – Andrews	10 – Bona	4 – Andrews	Galen Center (10,300); Los Angeles, CA
February 1, 2024; 7:30 p.m., P12N		Oregon State	W 71–63	10–11 (5–5)	18 – Tied	7 – McClendon	3 – Andrews	Pauley Pavilion (6,095); Los Angeles, CA
February 3, 2024; 7:00 p.m., ESPN2		Oregon	W 71–63	11–11 (6–5)	21 – Andrews	10 – Stefanović	7 – Andrews	Pauley Pavilion (8,723); Los Angeles, CA
February 7, 2024; 6:00 p.m., P12N		at Stanford	W 82–74	12–11 (7–5)	21 – Mack	8 – Bona	4 – Andrews	Maples Pavilion (3,844); Stanford, CA
February 10, 2024; 2:30 p.m., FOX		at California	W 61–60	13–11 (8–5)	13 – Bona	13 – Stefanović	2 – Andrews	Haas Pavilion (9,280); Berkeley, CA
February 15, 2024; 6:00 p.m., ESPN		Colorado	W 64–60	14–11 (9–5)	19 – Mack	7 – Bona	3 – McClendon	Pauley Pavilion (7,183); Los Angeles, CA
February 18, 2024; 4:00 p.m., FS1		Utah	L 69–70	14–12 (9–6)	19 – Stefanović	8 – Stefanović	3 – Stefanović	Pauley Pavilion (9,537); Los Angeles, CA
February 24, 2024; 7:00 p.m., ESPN		USC; Rivalry	L 56–62	14–13 (9–7)	14 – Bona	6 – Tied	5 – Andrews	Pauley Pavilion (13,659); Los Angeles, CA
February 29, 2024; 7:30 p.m., FS1		at Washington	L 77–94	14–14 (9–8)	22 – Stefanović	11 – Bona	11 – Andrews	Alaska Airlines Arena (7,893); Seattle, WA
March 2, 2024; 4:00 p.m., P12N		at No. 19 Washington State	L 65–77	14–15 (9–9)	21 – Andrews	8 – Stefanović	4 – Mack	Beasley Coliseum (8,096); Pullman, WA
March 7, 2024; 6:30 p.m., ESPN		No. 5 Arizona; Rivalry	L 65–88	14–16 (9–10)	20 – Stefanović	5 – Bona	3 – Mack	Pauley Pavilion (8,428); Los Angeles, CA
March 9, 2024; 8:00 p.m., FS1		Arizona State; Senior Night	W 59–47	15–16 (10–10)	20 – Bona	12 – Bona	6 – Tied	Pauley Pavilion (7,424); Los Angeles, CA
Pac-12 Tournament
March 13, 2024; 2:30 p.m., P12N	(5)	vs. (12) Oregon State; First round	W 67–57	16–16	31 – Andrews	9 – Stefanović	4 – Andrews	T-Mobile Arena (10,050); Paradise, NV
March 14, 2024; 2:30 p.m., P12N	(5)	vs. (4) Oregon; Quarterfinal	L 66–68	16–17	24 – Andrews	6 – Stefanović	2 – Andrews	T-Mobile Arena (14,076); Paradise, NV
*Non-conference game. ^{#}Rankings from AP Poll. (#) Tournament seedings in parentheses. All times are in Pacific Time.

== Rankings ==
Ranking movements Legend: ██ Increase in ranking ██ Decrease in ranking — = Not ranked RV = Received votes т = Tied with team above or below
	Week																			
Poll	Pre	1	2	3	4	5	6	7	8	9	10	11	12	13	14	15	16	17	18	Final
AP	RV	RV	RV	RV	RV	—	—	—	—	—	—	—	—	—						
Coaches	25	25т	24	RV	RV	—	—	—	—	—	—	—	—	—						

*AP does not release post-NCAA Tournament rankings

== Awards and honors ==
Recipient	Award (Pac-12 Conference)	Stats (PPG/RPG/APG)	Week	Date awarded	Ref.
Sebastian Mack	Freshman of the Week	19.0 PPG, 6.3 RPG, 2.3 APG	3	November 27	
Sebastian Mack	Freshman of the Week		7	December 26	
Dylan Andrews	Player of the Week	Averaged 19.5 points, 5.0 assists, 4.0 rebounds and 1.5 steals	13	February 5, 2024	

- March 12, 2024 – Adem Bona was named to the All-Pac-12 first team and voted the Pac-12 Defensive Player of the Year.
- March 12, 2024 – Sebastian Mack was named to the Pac-12 All-Freshman Team.
