= 2023–24 LIU Sharks men's basketball team =

American college basketball season

2023–24 LIU Sharks men's basketball
- Conference: Northeast Conference
- Record: 7–22 (6–10 NEC)
- Head coach: Rod Strickland (2nd season)
- Assistant coaches: Chris Thomas (2nd season); Sasha Brown (2nd season); Maurice Hicks (2nd season)
- Home arena: Steinberg Wellness Center

2023–24 Northeast Conference men's basketball standings
	Conf.				Overall
Team	W		L	PCT	W		L	PCT
Central Connecticut	13	–	3	.813	20	–	11	.645
Merrimack	13	–	3	.813	21	–	12	.636
Sacred Heart	10	–	6	.625	16	–	16	.500
Le Moyne*	9	–	7	.563	15	–	17	.469
Fairleigh Dickinson	9	–	7	.563	15	–	17	.469
Wagner †	7	–	9	.438	17	–	16	.515
LIU	6	–	10	.375	7	–	22	.241
Saint Francis	3	–	13	.188	8	–	22	.267
Stonehill*	2	–	14	.125	4	–	27	.129
† 2024 NEC tournament winner * ineligible for the 2024 NCAA tournament due to transition from Division II

The 2023–24 LIU Sharks men's basketball team represented Long Island University in the 2023–24 NCAA Division I men's basketball season. The Sharks, led by second-year head coach Rod Strickland, played their home games at the Steinberg Wellness Center in Brooklyn, New York as members of the Northeast Conference (NEC). They finished the season 7–22, 6–10 in NEC play, to finish in seventh place. They lost in the quarterfinals of the NEC tournament to Merrimack.

== Previous season ==
The Sharks finished the 2022–23 season 3–26, 1–15 in NEC play, to finish in last place. They lost to Merrimack in the first round of the NEC tournament.

== Preseason polls ==
=== Northeast Conference poll ===
The Northeast Conference released its preseason coaches' poll on October 24, 2023. The Sharks were picked to finish in seventh in the conference.

Rank	Team
1.	Sacred Heart (7)
2.	Central Connecticut (1)
3.	Fairleigh Dickinson (1)
4.	Merrimack
5.	Wagner
6.	Stonehill
7.	LIU
8.	Saint Francis
9.	Le Moyne

() first-place votes

== Roster ==
2023–24 LIU Sharks men's basketball team
Players
Coaches

Pos.	#	Name	Height	Weight	Year	Hometown
G	2	Eric Acker	6 ft 2 in (1.88 m)	160 lb (73 kg)	Fr	East New York, NY
F	3	Greg Kenney	6 ft 6 in (1.98 m)	176 lb (80 kg)	Fr	Williston Park, NY
G/F	4	Tre'shawn Sheppard	6 ft 6 in (1.98 m)	230 lb (104 kg)	Fr	Brooklyn, NY
G	5	Andre Washington	5 ft 11 in (1.8 m)	178 lb (81 kg)	Jr	Staten Island, NY
G/F	6	Tana Kopa	6 ft 6 in (1.98 m)	178 lb (81 kg)	Jr	Perth, Australia
F	8	Jason Steele	6 ft 6 in (1.98 m)	190 lb (86 kg)	Fr	Flushing, NY
G	10	R.J. Greene	6 ft 5 in (1.96 m)	210 lb (95 kg)	So	The Bronx, New York
G/F	11	Terell Strickland	6 ft 0 in (1.83 m)	175 lb (79 kg)	RS Jr	Tampa, FL
G	13	Tai Strickland	6 ft 2 in (1.88 m)	185 lb (84 kg)	GS	Tampa, FL
C	15	C.J. Delancy	6 ft 8 in (2.03 m)	210 lb (95 kg)	So	Jonesboro, AR
G	21	Ahmed Essahaty	6 ft 3 in (1.91 m)	201 lb (91 kg)	So	Wellington, New Zealand
F	23	Nikola Djapa	7 ft 0 in (2.13 m)	230 lb (104 kg)	Fr	Belgrade, Serbia
C	43	Gezim Bajrami	6 ft 9 in (2.06 m)	264 lb (120 kg)	Fr	Tampere, Finland

Head coach

- Rod Strickland (DePaul)

Assistant coach(es)

- Chris Thomas (Dayton)
- Shasha Brown (Wesleyan)
- Maurice Hicks (Loyola (MD))

Legend

- (C) Team captain
- (S) Suspended
- (I) Ineligible
- (W) Walk-on
- Injured
- Current redshirt

Roster
Last update: August 17, 2024

== Schedule and results ==
Date time, TV	Rank^{#}	Opponent^{#}	Result	Record	Site (attendance) city, state
Non-conference regular season
November 8, 2023*; 7:00 p.m., NEC Front Row		Fisk	Canceled		Steinberg Wellness Center; Brooklyn, NY
November 10, 2023*; 1:00 p.m., SNY		Air Force	L 67–82	0–1	Steinberg Wellness Center (812); Brooklyn, NY
November 13, 2023*; 10:00 p.m., ESPN+		at Pepperdine	L 53–88	0–2	Firestone Fieldhouse (327); Malibu, CA
November 15, 2023*; 10:00 p.m., P12N		at UCLA	L 58–78	0–3	Pauley Pavilion (4,751); Los Angeles, CA
November 22, 2023*; 7:00 p.m., SNY, ESPN+		at Columbia	L 67–77	0–4	Levien Gymnasium (622); Manhattan, NY
November 24, 2023*; 2:00 p.m., ESPN+		vs. Texas A&M–Corpus Christi; NKU Thanksgiving Tournament	W 83–68	1–4	Truist Arena (358); Highland Heights, KY
November 25, 2023*; 4:00 p.m., ESPN+		at Northern Kentucky; NKU Thanksgiving Tournament	L 64–72	1–5	Truist Arena (2,340); Highland Heights, KY
December 2, 2023*; 6:00 p.m., ESPN+		at FIU	L 59–74	1–6	Ocean Bank Convocation Center (681); Miami, FL
December 6, 2023*; 7:00 p.m., ACCNX		at No. 15 Miami	L 49–97	1–7	Watsco Center (5,818); Coral Gables, FL
December 12, 2023*; 6:00 p.m., ESPN+		at UMass Lowell	L 65–78	1–8	Costello Athletic Center (475); Lowell, MA
December 16, 2023*; 1:00 p.m., BTN+		at Rutgers	L 61–83	1–9	Jersey Mike's Arena (8,000); Piscataway, NJ
December 23, 2023*; 1:00 p.m., ESPN+		at Mount St. Mary's	L 59–87	1–10	Knott Arena (1,782); Emmitsburg, MD
December 28, 2023*; 7:00 p.m., SNY		Albany	L 69–86	1–11	Barclays Center (1,704); Brooklyn, NY
NEC regular season
January 4, 2023; 7:00 p.m., NEC Front Row		Wagner	W 69–67	2–11 (1–0)	Steinberg Wellness Center (489); Brooklyn, NY
January 6, 2024; 2:00 p.m., NEC Front Row		at Stonehill	W 73–68	3–11 (2–0)	Merkert Gymnasium (340); Easton, MA
January 13, 2024; 2:00 p.m., NEC Front Row		at Sacred Heart	L 55–89	3–12 (2–1)	William H. Pitt Center (485); Fairfield, CT
January 19, 2024; 7:00 p.m., NEC Front Row		at Saint Francis (PA)	L 66–72	3–13 (2–2)	DeGol Arena (640); Loretto, PA
January 21, 2024; 7:00 p.m., SNY		Central Connecticut	L 63–72	3–14 (2–3)	Steinberg Wellness Center (458); Brooklyn, NY
January 25, 2024; 7:00 p.m., NEC Front Row		Stonehill	W 63–60	4–14 (3–3)	Steinberg Wellness Center (534); Brooklyn, NY
January 27, 2024; 2:00 p.m., NEC Front Row		at Le Moyne	L 74–87	4–15 (3–4)	Ted Grant Court (943); DeWitt, NY
February 1, 2024; 7:00 p.m., YES		at FDU	L 75–82	4–16 (3–5)	Bogota Savings Bank Center (557); Hackensack, NJ
February 3, 2024; 7:00 p.m., NEC Front Row		Saint Francis (PA)	W 70–67	5–16 (4–5)	Steinberg Wellness Center (792); Brooklyn, NY
February 8, 2024; 7:00 p.m., NEC Front Row		Merrimack	L 79–82 ^{OT}	5–17 (4–6)	Steinberg Wellness center (521); Brooklyn, NY
February 10, 2024; 8:00 p.m., SNY		Sacred Heart	W 75–58	6–17 (5–6)	Steinberg Wellness Center (366); Brooklyn, NY
February 15, 2024; 7:00 p.m., NEC Front Row		Fairleigh Dickinson	L 82–84 ^{OT}	6–18 (5–7)	Steinberg Wellness Center (251); Brooklyn, NY
February 17, 2024; 3:00 p.m., NEC Front Row		at Merrimack	L 68–83	6–19 (5–8)	Hammel Court (1,347); North Andover, MA
February 22, 2024; 7:00 p.m., NEC Front Row		Le Moyne	W 76–64	7–19 (6–8)	Steinberg Wellness Center (347); Brooklyn, NY
February 25, 2024; 1:00 p.m., CBSSN		at Wagner	L 57–72	7–20 (6–9)	Spiro Sports Center (1,276); Staten Island, NY
February 29, 2024; 7:00 p.m., NEC Front Row		Central Connecticut	L 64–78	7–21 (6–10)	William H. Detrick Gymnasium (1429); New Britain, CT
NEC tournament
March 6, 2024; 7:00 p.m., NEC Front Row	(7)	at (2) Merrimack; Quarterfinals	L 66–72	7–22	Hammel Court (1,076); North Andover, MA
*Non-conference game. ^{#}Rankings from AP poll. (#) Tournament seedings in parentheses. All times are in Eastern.
