= 2023–24 Wagner Seahawks men's basketball team =

Basketball team season

2023–24 Wagner Seahawks men's basketball
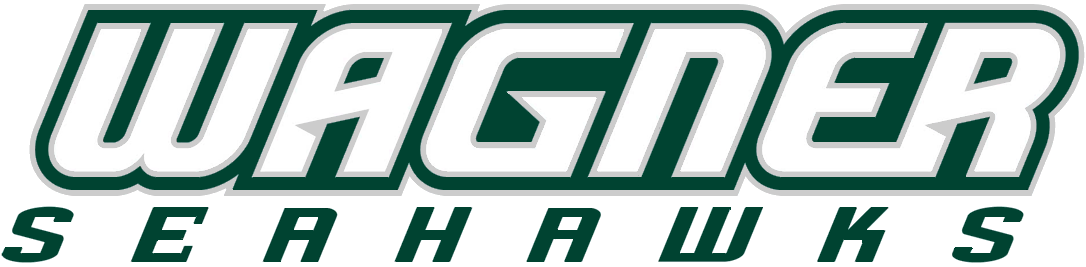

NEC tournament champions

NCAA tournament, First Round
- Conference: Northeast Conference
- Record: 17–16 (7–9 NEC)
- Head coach: Donald Copeland (2nd season)
- Assistant coaches: Kevin Jones; Scott Rodgers; Kevin Lynch
- Home arena: Spiro Sports Center

2023–24 Northeast Conference men's basketball standings
	Conf.				Overall
Team	W		L	PCT	W		L	PCT
Central Connecticut	13	–	3	.813	20	–	11	.645
Merrimack	13	–	3	.813	21	–	12	.636
Sacred Heart	10	–	6	.625	16	–	16	.500
Le Moyne*	9	–	7	.563	15	–	17	.469
Fairleigh Dickinson	9	–	7	.563	15	–	17	.469
Wagner †	7	–	9	.438	17	–	16	.515
LIU	6	–	10	.375	7	–	22	.241
Saint Francis	3	–	13	.188	8	–	22	.267
Stonehill*	2	–	14	.125	4	–	27	.129
† 2024 NEC tournament winner * ineligible for the 2024 NCAA tournament due to transition from Division II

The 2023–24 Wagner Seahawks men's basketball team represented Wagner College during the 2023–24 NCAA Division I men's basketball season. The Seahawks, led by second-year head coach Donald Copeland, played their home games at the Spiro Sports Center in Staten Island, New York as members of the Northeast Conference. They finished the season 17–16, 7–9 in NEC play to finish in sixth place. As the No. 6 seed in the NEC Tournament, they defeated Sacred Heart, Central Connecticut, and Merrimack to win the NEC tournament championship, as a result, they received the conference's automatic bid to the NCAA tournament for the second time in school history and the first time since 2003. As a No. 16 seed in the West region, they defeated to Howard in the First Four, before losing to North Carolina in the First Round.

== Preseason polls ==
=== Northeast Conference poll ===
The Northeast Conference released its preseason coaches' poll on October 24, 2023. The Seahawks were picked to finish in fifth in the conference.

Rank	Team
1.	Sacred Heart (7)
2.	Central Connecticut (1)
3.	Fairleigh Dickinson (1)
4.	Merrimack
5.	Wagner
6.	Stonehill
7.	LIU
8.	Saint Francis
9.	Le Moyne

() first place votes

== Previous season ==
The Seahawks finished the 2022–23 season 15–13, 8–8 in NEC play to finish in a tie for fifth place. In the NEC tournament, they were defeated by Sacred Heart in the first round.

== Roster ==
2023–24 Wagner Seahawks men's basketball team
Players
Coaches

Pos.	#	Name	Height	Weight	Year	Previous school	Hometown
G	0	Rahmir Moore	6 ft 3 in (1.91 m)	205 lb (93 kg)	Sr	Saint Joseph's	Philadelphia, Pennsylvania
G	1	Javier Ezquerra	6 ft 1 in (1.85 m)	175 lb (79 kg)	Jr	IMG Academy	San Juan, Puerto Rico
G	2	Di'Andre Howell-South	6 ft 4 in (1.93 m)	200 lb (91 kg)	RS So	St. Francis Brooklyn	Paterson, New Jersey
F	4	Tyje Kelton	6 ft 7 in (2.01 m)	190 lb (86 kg)	Jr	Monroe College	Dunellen, New Jersey
G	5	Zae Blake	6 ft 1 in (1.85 m)	180 lb (82 kg)	Sr	Green Bay	Washington, D.C.
G	10	Tahron Allen	6 ft 5 in (1.96 m)	200 lb (91 kg)	Jr	Monmouth	Brooklyn, New York
G	11	Melvin Council Jr.	6 ft 4 in (1.93 m)	185 lb (84 kg)	Jr	Monroe College	Rochester, New York
G	12	Zaire Williams	6 ft 4 in (1.93 m)	190 lb (86 kg)	Jr	Eagle Academy	Brooklyn, New York
G	13	Julian Brown	6 ft 1 in (1.85 m)	190 lb (86 kg)	So	Bergen Catholic High School	Middletown, New York
F	15	Seck Zongo	6 ft 7 in (2.01 m)	195 lb (88 kg)	Fr	The Patrick School	Bronx, New York
F	22	Churchill Bounds	6 ft 10 in (2.08 m)	260 lb (118 kg)	Sr	Central Arkansas	Berlin, Maryland
F	24	Rob Taylor II	6 ft 7 in (2.01 m)	220 lb (100 kg)	Jr	St. Mark's School	Brooklyn, New York
F	32	Keyontae Lewis	6 ft 9 in (2.06 m)	255 lb (116 kg)	So	Lloyd C. Bird High School	Chesterfield, Virginia

Head coach

- Donald Copeland (Seton Hall)

Assistant coach(es)

- Kevin Jones (Bowie State)
- Scott Rodgers (Drexel)
- Kevin Lynch (Seton Hall)

Legend

- (C) Team captain
- (S) Suspended
- (I) Ineligible
- (W) Walk-on
- Injured
- Current redshirt

Roster
Last update: October 25, 2023

== Schedule and results ==
Date time, TV	Rank^{#}	Opponent^{#}	Result	Record	High points	High rebounds	High assists	Site (attendance) city, state
Non-conference regular season
November 6, 2023*; 7:30 pm		at Fordham	L 64–68 ^{OT}	0–1	21 – Council Jr.	13 – Kelton	1 – Tied	Rose Hill Gymnasium (1,837); Bronx, NY
November 9, 2023*; 7:00 pm		Molloy	W 83–48	1–1	13 – Council Jr.	12 – Allen	3 – Tied	Spiro Sports Center (1,046); Staten Island, NY
November 14, 2023*; 7:00 pm		at Rhode Island	L 53–69	1–2	10 – Kelton	5 – Kelton	5 – Tied	Ryan Center (3,795); Kingston, RI
November 18, 2023*; 12:00 pm		at Seton Hall	L 51–72	1–3	9 – Kelton	6 – Kelton	4 – Taylor II	Prudential Center (8,344); Newark, NJ
November 25, 2023*; 1:00 pm		NJIT	W 64–51	2–3	18 – Council Jr.	7 – Lewis	4 – Tied	Spiro Sports Center (558); Staten Island, NY
November 28, 2023*; 7:00 pm		at Providence	L 52–86	2–4	17 – Council Jr.	8 – Council Jr.	2 – Zongo	Amica Mutual Pavilion (8,069); Providence, RI
December 2, 2023*; 3:30 pm		at Stony Brook	W 60–59	3–4	13 – Tied	6 – Council Jr.	5 – Ezquerra	Island Federal Arena (1,765); Stony Brook, NY
December 6, 2023*; 7:00 pm		at Coppin State	W 62–59	4–4	21 – Williams	11 – Lewis	3 – Ezquerra	Physical Education Complex (532); Baltimore, MD
December 10, 2023*; 1:00 pm		Boston University	L 59–73	4–5	15 – Williams	4 – Tied	5 – Council Jr.	Spiro Sports Center (905); Staten Island, NY
December 17, 2023*; 2:00 pm, ESPN+		at Fairfield	L 51–63	4–6	13 – Council Jr.	7 – Tied	4 – Council Jr.	Leo D. Mahoney Arena (1,616); Fairfield, CT
December 22, 2023*; 2:00 pm		Gwynedd Mercy	W 98–49	5–6	28 – Council Jr.	8 – Tied	11 – Council Jr.	Spiro Sports Center (312); Staten Island, NY
December 30, 2023*; 7:00 pm, ESPN+		at Manhattan	W 68–56	6–6	17 – Allen	12 – Council Jr.	7 – Ezquerra	Draddy Gymnasium (909); Riverdale, NY
NEC regular season
January 4, 2024; 7:00 pm		at LIU	L 67–69	6–7 (0–1)	16 – Allen	8 – Tied	9 – Ezquerra	Steinberg Wellness Center (489); Brooklyn, NY
January 6, 2024; 4:00 pm		Saint Francis (PA)	W 71–56	7–7 (1–1)	19 – Brown	6 – Council Jr.	5 – Tied	Spiro Sports Center (989); Staten Island, NY
January 15, 2024; 1:00 pm		Stonehill	W 64–54	8–7 (2–1)	16 – Ezquerra	9 – Allen	6 – Ezquerra	Spiro Sports Center (972); Staten Island, NY
January 19, 2024; 7:00 pm		at Merrimack	W 71–65	9–7 (3–1)	15 – Council Jr.	13 – Council Jr.	7 – Ezquerra	Hammel Court (812); North Andover, MA
January 21, 2024; 2:00 pm		at Sacred Heart	L 61–66	9–8 (3–2)	14 – Council Jr.	11 – Allen	6 – Council Jr.	William H. Pitt Center (641); Fairfield, CT
January 25, 2024; 7:00 pm		Merrimack	L 44–60	9–9 (3–3)	11 – Brown	8 – Lewis	5 – Ezquerra	Spiro Sports Center (889); Staten Island, NY
January 27, 2024; 1:00 pm		at Central Connecticut	L 68–69 ^{OT}	9–10 (3–4)	22 – Ezquerra	11 – Lewis	3 – Kelton	William H. Detrick Gymnasium (1,121); New Britain, CT
February 1, 2024; 7:00 pm		Le Moyne	W 80–57	10–10 (4–4)	23 – Brown	10 – Allen	10 – Ezquerra	Spiro Sports Center (1,093); Staten Island, NY
February 3, 2024; 2:00 pm		at Stonehill	L 61–71	10–11 (4–5)	19 – Council Jr.	7 – Council Jr.	6 – Ezquerra	Merkert Gymnasium (1,025); Easton, MA
February 8, 2024; 7:00 pm		at Fairleigh Dickinson	W 66–62	11–11 (5–5)	22 – Allen	7 – Brown	5 – Council	Bogota Savings Bank Center (347); Hackensack, NJ
February 15, 2024; 7:00 pm		at Saint Francis (PA)	W 65–63 ^{OT}	12–11 (6–5)	20 – Council Jr.	8 – Council Jr.	3 – Ezquerra	DeGol Arena (703); Loretto, PA
February 17, 2024; 4:00 pm, ESPN+		Sacred Heart	L 53–63	12–12 (6–6)	17 – Council Jr.	10 – Ezquerra	8 – Ezquerra	Spiro Sports Center (1,173); Staten Island, NY
February 22, 2024; 7:00 pm		Central Connecticut	L 72–73	12–13 (6–7)	17 – Brown	7 – Tied	8 – Ezquerra	Spiro Sports Center (1,051); Staten Island, NY
February 24, 2024; 1:00 pm		LIU	W 72–57	13–13 (7–7)	25 – Council Jr.	7 – Tied	6 – Council Jr.	Spiro Sports Center (1,276); Staten Island, NY
February 29, 2024; 7:00 pm		at Le Moyne	L 56–70	13–14 (7–8)	21 – Council Jr.	8 – Kelton	3 – Ezquerra	Ted Grant Court (570); Syracuse, NY
March 2, 2024; 4:30 pm		Fairleigh Dickinson	L 54–57	13–15 (7–9)	16 – Council Jr.	13 – Council Jr.	5 – Council Jr.	Spiro Sports Center (1,486); Staten Island, NY
NEC Tournament
March 6, 2024; 7:00 pm, NEC Front Row	(6)	at (3) Sacred Heart; Quarterfinals	W 60–57	14–15	22 – Allen	9 – Council Jr.	5 – Ezquerra	William H. Pitt Center (361); Fairfield, CT
March 9, 2024; 2:00 pm, YES/ESPN+	(6)	at (1) Central Connecticut; Semifinals	W 66–56	15–15	20 – Brown	9 – Lewis	5 – Ezquerra	William H. Detrick Gymnasium (2,449); New Britain, CT
March 12, 2024; 7:00 pm, ESPN2	(6)	at (2) Merrimack; Championship	W 54–47	16–15	22 – Allen	12 – Lewis	3 – Brown	Lawler Arena; North Andover, MA
NCAA Tournament
March 19, 2024; 6:40 pm, TruTV	(16 W)	vs. (16 W) Howard; First Four	W 71–68	17–15	21 – Council Jr.	7 – Lewis	8 – Ezquerra	UD Arena; Dayton, OH
March 21, 2024; 2:45 pm, CBS	(16 W)	vs. (1 W) No. 5 North Carolina; First Round	L 62–90	17–16	18 – Tied	5 – Allen	4 – Brown	Spectrum Center (18,223); Charlotte, NC
*Non-conference game. ^{#}Rankings from AP Poll. (#) Tournament seedings in parentheses. All times are in Eastern.
