= 2023–24 Sacred Heart Pioneers men's basketball team =

American college basketball season

2023–24 Sacred Heart Pioneers men's basketball
- Conference: Northeast Conference
- Record: 16–16 (10–6 NEC)
- Head coach: Anthony Latina (11th season)
- Associate head coach: Kyle Steinway
- Assistant coaches: Tom Barrett; Anthony Richards
- Home arena: William H. Pitt Center

2023–24 Northeast Conference men's basketball standings
	Conf.				Overall
Team	W		L	PCT	W		L	PCT
Central Connecticut	13	–	3	.813	20	–	11	.645
Merrimack	13	–	3	.813	21	–	12	.636
Sacred Heart	10	–	6	.625	16	–	16	.500
Le Moyne*	9	–	7	.563	15	–	17	.469
Fairleigh Dickinson	9	–	7	.563	15	–	17	.469
Wagner †	7	–	9	.438	17	–	16	.515
LIU	6	–	10	.375	7	–	22	.241
Saint Francis	3	–	13	.188	8	–	22	.267
Stonehill*	2	–	14	.125	4	–	27	.129
† 2024 NEC tournament winner * ineligible for the 2024 NCAA tournament due to transition from Division II

The 2023–24 Sacred Heart Pioneers men's basketball team represented Sacred Heart University during the 2023–24 NCAA Division I men's basketball season. The Pioneers, led by 11th-year head coach Anthony Latina, played their home games at the William H. Pitt Center in Fairfield, Connecticut as members of the Northeast Conference.

On October 23, 2023, it was announced that this season would be the last for Sacred Heart as members of the Northeast Conference, as they will be joining the Metro Atlantic Athletic Conference next season.

== Preseason polls ==
=== Northeast Conference poll ===
The Northeast Conference released its preseason coaches' poll on October 24, 2023. The Pioneers were picked to finish first in the conference.

Rank	Team
1.	Sacred Heart (7)
2.	Central Connecticut (1)
3.	Fairleigh Dickinson (1)
4.	Merrimack
5.	Wagner
6.	Stonehill
7.	LIU
8.	Saint Francis
9.	Le Moyne

() first-place votes

=== Preseason All-Conference Team ===
Guards Nico Galette and Joey Reilly were selected as members of the NEC Preseason All-Conference Team.

== Previous season ==
The Pioneers finished the 2022–23 season 16–17, 8–8 in NEC play, to finish tied for fifth place. They defeated Wagner in the quarterfinals of the NEC tournament, before falling to top-seeded Merrimack in the semifinals.

== Roster ==
2023–24 Sacred Heart Pioneers men's basketball team
Players
Coaches

Pos.	#	Name	Height	Weight	Year	Previous school	Hometown
G	1	Joey Reilly	6 ft 0 in (1.83 m)	170 lb (77 kg)	GS	Holy Cross	Cromwell, CT
F	2	Anquan Hill	6 ft 9 in (2.06 m)	200 lb (91 kg)	RS Fr	St. Bonaventure	Philadelphia, PA
G	3	Mike Sixsmith	6 ft 2 in (1.88 m)	175 lb (79 kg)	Sr	Holy Trinity High School	Hicksville, NY
F	4	Chris Nana	6 ft 5 in (1.96 m)	—	Fr	AITE	Darien, CT
G	5	Raheem Solomon	6 ft 3 in (1.91 m)	185 lb (84 kg)	GS	Niagara	Hartford, CT
G	10	Kyle McGee	6 ft 4 in (1.93 m)	175 lb (79 kg)	Sr	West Chester	Jersey City, NJ
G	11	Daniel Bublil	6 ft 0 in (1.83 m)	165 lb (75 kg)	Fr	IMG Academy	Ra'anana, Israel
G	13	Najee Coursey	6 ft 6 in (1.98 m)	175 lb (79 kg)	RS So	Cedar Creek High School	Galloway, NJ
F	14	Tommaso Ferraresi	6 ft 5 in (1.96 m)	205 lb (93 kg)	Sr	IMG Academy	Venice, Italy
F	15	Raymond Espinal-Guzman	6 ft 8 in (2.03 m)	220 lb (100 kg)	RS So	Woodstock Academy	Cranston, RI
G	22	Brendan McGuire	6 ft 7 in (2.01 m)	210 lb (95 kg)	GS	Quinnipiac	Garden City, NY
F	23	Lucius Gibson-Savadel	6 ft 11 in (2.11 m)	235 lb (107 kg)	Fr	Millbrook High School	Bay Shore, NY
F	25	Tanner Thomas	6 ft 6 in (1.98 m)	205 lb (93 kg)	Jr	Williston Northampton School	Springfield, MA
F	31	Alex Sobel	6 ft 8 in (2.03 m)	230 lb (104 kg)	Sr	Middlebury	Setauket, NY
G	35	Aidan Carpenter	6 ft 5 in (1.96 m)	190 lb (86 kg)	RS Jr	Siena	Hamden, CT
G	45	Nico Galette	6 ft 6 in (1.98 m)	210 lb (95 kg)	Sr	Rutgers Prep	Rahway, NJ

Head coach

- Anthony Latina (Brandeis)

Assistant coach(es)

- Kyle Steinway (Providence)
- Tom Barrett (Temple)
- Anthony Richards (Le Moyne)

Legend

- (C) Team captain
- (S) Suspended
- (I) Ineligible
- (W) Walk-on
- Injured
- Current redshirt

Roster
Last update: November 26, 2023

== Schedule and results ==
Date time, TV	Rank^{#}	Opponent^{#}	Result	Record	Site (attendance) city, state
Non-conference regular season
November 6, 2023*; 7:00 pm, NEC Front Row		Sarah Lawrence	W 95–51	1–0	William H. Pitt Center (721); Fairfield, CT
November 10, 2023*; 7:00 pm, ESPN+		at Iona	L 81–88	1–1	Hynes Athletics Center (2,401); New Rochelle, NY
November 14, 2023*; 7:00 pm, ESPN+		at Holy Cross	W 84–77	2–1	Hart Center (1,176); Worcester, MA
November 17, 2023*; 11:00 am, ESPN+		at UMBC; UMBC MTE	L 80–85	2–2	Chesapeake Employers Insurance Arena (1,618); Catonsville, MD
November 18, 2023*; 11:00 am		vs. Loyola (MD); UMBC MTE	W 66–51	3–2	Chesapeake Employers Insurance Arena (115); Catonsville, MD
November 21, 2023*; 11:30 am, NEC Front Row		Binghamton	W 89–75	4–2	William H. Pitt Center (1,209); Fairfield, CT
November 26, 2023*; 1:00 pm, ESPN+		at Saint Joseph's	L 55–64	4–3	Hagan Arena (1,501); Philadelphia, PA
November 30, 2023*; 7:00 pm, NEC Front Row		New Hampshire	L 84–90	4–4	William H. Pitt Center (664); Fairfield, CT
December 2, 2023*; 2:00 pm, NEC Front Row		Boston University	L 49–70	4–5	William H. Pitt Center (617); Fairfield, CT
December 6, 2023*; 7:00 pm, CBSSN		at St. John's	L 50–85	4–6	Carnesecca Arena (5,602); Queens, NY
December 9, 2023*; 6:00 pm, SNY		Fairfield	L 57–67	4–7	William H. Pitt Center (1,387); Fairfield, CT
December 16, 2023*; 1:30 pm, FS1		at Providence	L 64–78	4–8	Amica Mutual Pavilion (8,813); Providence, RI
December 19, 2023*; 7:00 pm, ESPN+		at Albany	L 79–93	4–9	Broadview Center (1,415); Albany, NY
December 21, 2023*; 11:30 am, NEC Front Row		Dartmouth	W 67–57	5–9	William H. Pitt Center (2,400); Fairfield, CT
December 30, 2023*; 2:00 pm, NEC Front Row		Mercy	W 92–63	6–9	William H. Pitt Center (312); Fairfield, CT
NEC regular season
January 4, 2024; 11:30 am, NEC Front Row		Saint Francis	W 79–67	7–9 (1–0)	William H. Pitt Center (2,000); Fairfield, CT
January 6, 2024; 3:00 pm, NEC Front Row		at Merrimack	L 58–82	7–10 (1–1)	Hammel Court (547); North Andover, MA
January 13, 2024; 2:00 pm, NEC Front Row		LIU	W 89–55	8–10 (2–1)	William H. Pitt Center (485); Fairfield, CT
January 15, 2024; 7:00 pm, NEC Front Row		at Le Moyne	W 80–73	9–10 (3–1)	Ted Grant Court (483); DeWitt, NY
January 21, 2024; 2:00 pm, NEC Front Row		Wagner	W 66–61	10–10 (4–1)	William H. Pitt Center (641); Fairfield, CT
January 25, 2024; 7:00 pm, NEC Front Row		at Saint Francis	L 71–75	10–11 (4–2)	DeGol Arena (725); Loretto, PA
January 27, 2024; 2:00 pm, NEC Front Row		at Fairleigh Dickinson	L 91–93	10–12 (4–3)	Bogota Savings Bank Center (673); Hackensack, NJ
February 1, 2024; 7:00 pm, NEC Front Row		Stonehill	W 77–72	11–12 (5–3)	William H. Pitt Center (480); Fairfield, CT
February 3, 2024; 2:00 pm, NEC Front Row		Le Moyne	W 87–81	12–12 (6–3)	William H. Pitt Center (597); Fairfield, CT
February 8, 2024; 7:00 pm, NEC Front Row		at Central Connecticut	L 70–77	12–13 (6–4)	William H. Detrick Gymnasium (2,023); New Britain, CT
February 10, 2024; 8:00 pm, NEC Front Row		at LIU	L 58–75	12–14 (6–5)	Steinberg Wellness Center (366); Brooklyn, NY
February 17, 2024; 4:00 pm, NEC Front Row		at Wagner	W 63–53	13–14 (7–5)	Spiro Sports Center (1,173); Staten Island, NY
February 22, 2024; 7:00 pm, NEC Front Row		Fairleigh Dickinson	W 99–91	14–14 (8–5)	William H. Pitt Center (722); Fairfield, CT
February 24, 2024; 2:00 pm, NEC Front Row		Central Connecticut	L 67–68	14–15 (8–6)	William H. Pitt Center (1,046); Fairfield, CT
February 29, 2024; 7:00 pm, NEC Front Row		at Stonehill	W 79–51	15–15 (9–6)	Merkert Gymnasium; Easton, MA
March 2, 2024; 2:00 pm, NEC Front Row		Merrimack	W 89–85	16–15 (10–6)	William H. Pitt Center (458); Fairfield, CT
NEC tournament
March 6, 2024; 7:00 pm, NEC Front Row	(3)	(6) Wagner; Quarterfinals	L 57–60	16–16	William H. Pitt Center (361); Fairfield, CT
*Non-conference game. ^{#}Rankings from AP poll. (#) Tournament seedings in parentheses. All times are in Eastern.
