= Jack Castleberry =

American basketball player and coach

Current position
- Title: Head coach
- Team: Fairleigh Dickinson
- Conference: NEC
- Record: 42–61 (.408)

Biographical details
- Born: May 14, 1984 (age 42); Virginia Beach, Virginia, U.S.

Playing career
- 2003–2007: VMI

Coaching career (HC unless noted)
- 2007–2008: UT Martin (assistant)
- 2008–2012: VMI (assistant)
- 2012–2014: Siena (women's assistant)
- 2016–2022: The Citadel (assistant)
- 2022–2023: Fairleigh Dickinson (assistant)
- 2023–present: Fairleigh Dickinson

Head coaching record
- Overall: 42–61 (.408)

Jack Castleberry (born May 14, 1984) is an American basketball coach who is the current head coach of the Fairleigh Dickinson Knights men's basketball team.

== Playing career ==
Castleberry initially walked on at VMI under coach Duggar Baucom before earning a scholarship and becoming a two-year starter and captain.

== Coaching career ==
After graduation, Castleberry became an assistant coach at UT Martin for a single season before returning to his alma mater to serve as an assistant coach from 2008 to 2012. Castleberry would join the women's basketball coaching staff at Siena for two seasons, where he'd meet Tobin Anderson, then an assistant with the men's program.

After leaving basketball for two seasons to become a financial planner, Castleberry reunited with Baucom at The Citadel in 2016, where he stayed on staff as an assistant until 2022. He'd join up with Anderson on his first coaching staff at Fairleigh Dickinson, and was part of the Knights 16–seed over 1–seed upset of Purdue at the 2023 NCAA Tournament.

After Anderson left to take the head coaching position at Iona, Castleberry was promoted to head coach on March 21, 2023.

== Head coaching record ==
=== NCAA D1 ===
Record table
Season	Team	Overall	Conference	Standing	Postseason
Fairleigh Dickinson Knights (NEC) (2023–present)
2023–24	Fairleigh Dickinson	15–17	9–7	T–4th	
2024–25	Fairleigh Dickinson	13–20	8–8	T–4th	
2025–26	Fairleigh Dickinson	11–21	8–10	T–6th	
2026–27	Fairleigh Dickinson	3–3	0–0		
Fairleigh Dickinson:		42–61 (.408)	25–25 (.500)		
Total:		42–61 (.408)			
National champion Postseason invitational champion Conference regular season champion Conference regular season and conference tournament champion Division regular season champion Division regular season and conference tournament champion Conference tournament champion
