= 2023–24 Merrimack Warriors men's basketball team =

American college basketball season

2023–24 Merrimack Warriors men's basketball

NEC regular-season co-champions
- Conference: Northeast Conference
- Record: 21–12 (13–3 NEC)
- Head coach: Joe Gallo (8th season)
- Assistant coaches: Micky Burtnyk (15th season); Phil Gaetano (6th season); Juvaris Hayes (1st season); Chris Mohr (1st season)
- Home arena: Hammel Court

2023–24 Northeast Conference men's basketball standings
	Conf.				Overall
Team	W		L	PCT	W		L	PCT
Central Connecticut	13	–	3	.813	20	–	11	.645
Merrimack	13	–	3	.813	21	–	12	.636
Sacred Heart	10	–	6	.625	16	–	16	.500
Le Moyne*	9	–	7	.563	15	–	17	.469
Fairleigh Dickinson	9	–	7	.563	15	–	17	.469
Wagner †	7	–	9	.438	17	–	16	.515
LIU	6	–	10	.375	7	–	22	.241
Saint Francis	3	–	13	.188	8	–	22	.267
Stonehill*	2	–	14	.125	4	–	27	.129
† 2024 NEC tournament winner * ineligible for the 2024 NCAA tournament due to transition from Division II

The 2023–24 Merrimack Warriors men's basketball team represented Merrimack College in the 2023–24, NCAA Division I men's basketball season. The Warriors, led by eighth-year head coach Joe Gallo, played their home games at Hammel Court, with some games at Lawler Arena, located in North Andover, Massachusetts, as members of the Northeast Conference (NEC). They finished the season 21–12, 13–3 in NEC play, to finish in a tie for the regular-season championship. As the No. 2 seed in the NEC tournament, they defeated LIU and Le Moyne before losing to Wagner in the championship game.

On October 23, 2023, it was announced that this season would be the last for Merrimack as members of the Northeast Conference, as they will be joining the Metro Atlantic Athletic Conference next season.

== Previous season ==
The 2022–23 season marked Merrimack's final year of a four-year transition period from Division II to Division I. As a result, the Warriors were not be eligible to play in the NCAA tournament. However, a rule change made by the Northeast Conference allowed the Warriors to compete in the NEC tournament.

The Warriors finished the 2022–23 season 15–16, 12–4 in NEC play, to claim first place. In the NEC tournament, Merrimack defeated LIU, Sacred Heart and Fairleigh Dickinson to win the championship. Due to their ineligibility to compete in the NCAA tournament, runners-up Fairleigh Dickinson were awarded the NEC conference auto-bid, ending the Warriors' season with a final record of 18–16.

== Preseason polls ==
=== Northeast Conference poll ===
The Northeast Conference released its preseason coaches' poll on October 24, 2023. The Warriors were picked to finish in fourth in the conference.

Rank	Team
1.	Sacred Heart (7)
2.	Central Connecticut (1)
3.	Fairleigh Dickinson (1)
4.	Merrimack
5.	Wagner
6.	Stonehill
7.	LIU
8.	Saint Francis
9.	Le Moyne

() first-place votes

=== Preseason All-Conference Team ===
No Warriors were selected as members of the NEC Preseason All-Conference Team.

== Roster ==
2023–24 Merrimack Warriors men's basketball team
Players
Coaches

Pos.	#	Name	Height	Weight	Year	Previous school	Hometown
G	0	Adam "Budd" Clark	5 ft 10 in (1.78 m)	155 lb (70 kg)	Fr	West Catholic High School	Philadelphia, PA
G	1	Jaylen Stinson	6 ft 2 in (1.88 m)	170 lb (77 kg)	Jr	James Madison	Philadelphia, PA
F	2	Samba Diallo	6 ft 7 in (2.01 m)	195 lb (88 kg)	GS	Manhattan	Rufisque, Senegal
F	3	Christian Foy	6 ft 6 in (1.98 m)	210 lb (95 kg)	Fr	North Mecklenburg High School	Huntersville, NC
G	4	Jordan Derkack	6 ft 5 in (1.96 m)	205 lb (93 kg)	So	Spire Academy	Colonia, NJ
G	5	Devon Savage	6 ft 4 in (1.93 m)	190 lb (86 kg)	Jr	James Madison	Washington, D.C.
F	10	Elliott Black	6 ft 7 in (2.01 m)	220 lb (100 kg)	So	St. Stephen's & St. Agnes School	Washington, D.C.
F	11	Bryan Etumnu	6 ft 7 in (2.01 m)	215 lb (98 kg)	So	Kempner High School	Sugar Land, TX
G	12	Thomas Hall	6 ft 4 in (1.93 m)	195 lb (88 kg)	Jr	Albertus Magnus	Nanuet, NY
F	13	Edrick Quezada	6 ft 5 in (1.96 m)	210 lb (95 kg)	Fr	Brimmer and May School	Rockland, MA
F	14	Brandon Legris	6 ft 7 in (2.01 m)	210 lb (95 kg)	So	Perkiomen School	Hatfield, PA
F	15	Ryan Isaacson	6 ft 8 in (2.03 m)	200 lb (91 kg)	Sr	Hinsdale Central High School	Willowbrook, IL
F	20	Jacob O'Connell	7 ft 0 in (2.13 m)	245 lb (111 kg)	GS	Princeton	Voorhees, NJ
G	24	Jordan McKoy	6 ft 5 in (1.96 m)	180 lb (82 kg)	GS	Dwight-Englewood School	Westwood, NJ
G	33	Malik Edmead	5 ft 10 in (1.78 m)	165 lb (75 kg)	Jr	Albany	Deer Park, NY
G	34	Jaden Battle	6 ft 0 in (1.83 m)	150 lb (68 kg)	Fr	MacDuffie School	St. Albans, NY
G	41	Armandas Plintauskas	6 ft 4 in (1.93 m)	185 lb (84 kg)	So	Northern Illinois	Kėdainiai, Lithuania

Head coach

- Joe Gallo (Merrimack)

Assistant coach(es)

- Micky Burtnyk (Merrimack)
- Phil Gaetano (Sacred Heart)
- Juvaris Hayes (Merrimack)
- Chris Mohr (Merrimack)

Legend

- (C) Team captain
- (S) Suspended
- (I) Ineligible
- (W) Walk-on
- Injured
- Current redshirt

Roster
Last update: November 25, 2023

== Schedule and results ==
Date time, TV	Rank^{#}	Opponent^{#}	Result	Record	Site (attendance) city, state
Non-conference regular season
November 6, 2023*; 7:30 p.m., ESPN+		at Vermont	L 55–67	0–1	Patrick Gym (2,077); Burlington, VT
November 9, 2023*; 7:00 p.m., NEC Front Row		Worcester State	W 93–72	1–1	Hammel Court (697); North Andover, MA
November 12, 2023*; 4:00 p.m., ESPN+		at Maine	W 71–65	2–1	Memorial Gymnasium (815); Orono, ME
November 15, 2023*; 7:00 p.m., B1G		at Ohio State	L 52–76	2–2	Value City Arena (7,929); Columbus, OH
November 22, 2023*; 5:30 p.m.		vs. North Carolina A&T; Samford MTE	W 96–73	3–2	Pete Hanna Center (331); Homewood, AL
November 24, 2023*; 4:00 p.m., ESPN+		at Samford; Samford MTE	L 71–79	3–3	Pete Hanna Center (818); Homewood, AL
November 25, 2023*; 1:00 p.m.		vs. Alabama State; Samford MTE	L 60–66 ^{OT}	3–4	Pete Hanna Center (136); Homewood, AL
November 29, 2023*; 8:30 p.m., FS1		at Georgetown	L 67–69	3–5	Capital One Arena (2,744); Washington, D.C.
December 2, 2023*; 3:00 p.m., NEC Front Row		UMass Lowell	W 74–68	4–5	Lawler Arena (2,347); North Andover, MA
December 5, 2023*; 7:00 p.m., ESPN+/SECN+		at Florida	L 57–77	4–6	O'Connell Center (6,813); Gainesville, FL
December 9, 2023*; 7:30 p.m., NEC Front Row		Felician	W 89–85	5–6	Lawler Arena (769); North Andover, MA
December 19, 2023*; 7:00 p.m., ESPN+		at Cincinnati	L 49–65	5–7	Fifth Third Arena (9,477); Cincinnati, OH
December 22, 2023*; 2:00 p.m., NEC Front Row		Bucknell	W 68–52	6–7	Lawler Arena (587); North Andover, MA
December 30, 2023*; 2:00 p.m., ESPN+		at Boston University	L 63–74	6–8	Case Gym (860); Boston, MA
NEC regular season
January 4, 2024; 7:00 p.m., NEC Front Row		Fairleigh Dickinson	W 60–56	7–8 (1–0)	Lawler Arena (693); North Andover, MA
January 6, 2024; 3:00 p.m., NEC Front Row		Sacred Heart	W 82–58	8–8 (2–0)	Lawler Arena (547); North Andover, MA
January 13, 2024; 2:00 p.m., NEC Front Row		at Le Moyne	W 66–62	9–8 (3–0)	Ted Grant Court (466); DeWitt, NY
January 15, 2024; 4:00 p.m., NEC Front Row		at Central Connecticut	L 70–75	9–9 (3–1)	William H. Detrick Gymnasium (1,022); New Britain, CT
January 19, 2024; 7:00 p.m., NEC Front Row		Wagner	L 65–71	9–10 (3–2)	Hammel Court (812); North Andover, MA
January 21, 2024; 2:00 p.m., NEC Front Row		Stonehill	W 63–47	10–10 (4–2)	Hammel Court (861); North Andover, MA
January 25, 2024; 7:00 p.m., NEC Front Row		at Wagner	W 60–44	11–10 (5–2)	Spiro Sports Center (889); Staten Island, NY
January 27, 2024; 4:00 p.m., NEC Front Row		at Saint Francis (PA)	W 74–55	12–10 (6–2)	DeGol Arena (882); Loretto, PA
February 3, 2024; 3:00 p.m., NEC Front Row		Central Connecticut	W 71–68	13–10 (7–2)	Lawler Arena (1,936); North Andover, MA
February 8, 2024; 7:00 p.m., NEC Front Row		at LIU	W 82–79 ^{OT}	14–10 (8–2)	Steinberg Wellness Center (521); Brooklyn, NY
February 10, 2024; 3:00 p.m., NEC Front Row		Le Moyne	W 66–50	15–10 (9–2)	Hammel Court (782); North Andover, MA
February 15, 2024; 7:00 p.m., NEC Front Row		at Stonehill	W 66–63	16–10 (10–2)	Merkert Gymnasium (820); Easton, MA
February 17, 2024; 3:00 p.m., NEC Front Row		LIU	W 83–68	17–10 (11–2)	Hammel Court (1,347); North Andover, MA
February 22, 2024; 7:00 p.m., NEC Front Row		Saint Francis	W 71–60	18–10 (12–2)	Lawler Arena (1,346); North Andover, MA
February 29, 2024; 7:00 p.m., NEC Front Row		at Fairleigh Dickinson	W 74–55	19–10 (13–2)	Bogota Savings Bank Center (563); Hackensack, NJ
March 2, 2024; 2:00 p.m., NEC Front Row		at Sacred Heart	L 85–89	19–11 (13–3)	William H. Pitt Center (458); Fairfield, CT
NEC tournament
March 6, 2024; 7:00 p.m., NEC Front Row	(2)	(7) LIU; Quarterfinals	W 72–66	20–11	Lawler Arena (1,076); North Andover, MA
March 9, 2024; 12:00 p.m., YES/ESPN+	(2)	(4) Le Moyne; Semifinals	W 61–51	21–11	Lawler Arena (1,565); North Andover, MA
March 12, 2024; 7:00 p.m., ESPN2	(2)	(6) Wagner; Championship	L 47–54	21–12	Lawler Arena; North Andover, MA
*Non-conference game. ^{#}Rankings from AP poll. (#) Tournament seedings in parentheses. All times are in Eastern.
