= Lazar Stefanović (basketball) =

Serbian basketball player (born 2002)

- Stefanović in 2026

No. 1 – Igokea m:tel
- Position: Shooting guard / small forward
- League: Bosnian League; ABA League

Personal information
- Born: April 27, 2002 (age 24) Belgrade, Serbia, FR Yugoslavia
- Listed height: 6 ft 7 in (2.01 m)
- Listed weight: 190 lb (86 kg)

Career information
- College: Utah (2021–2023); UCLA (2023–2025)
- Playing career: 2019–present

Career history
- 2019–2021: Partizan
- 2019–2020: →Mladost Zemun
- 2025–2026: FMP
- 2026–present: Igokea

Career highlights
- Serbian Cup winner (2020); Pac-12 All-Freshman Team (2022)

Lazar Stefanović (Serbian Cyrillic: Лазар Стефановић; born 27 April 2002), nicknamed Stef, is a Serbian professional basketball player for Igokea m:tel of the Bosnian League and the ABA League. He played college basketball for the Utah Utes and UCLA Bruins.

== Early life and high school career ==
Stefanović was born in Belgrade, Serbia to Radmila and Goran Stefanovič, he grew up playing soccer in hopes of being a professional soccer player. After discovering basketball at nine years old, he abandoned soccer and began focusing more on basketball and playing it more often when his doctor told him that he will reach a height of 6’4 inches. For high school, Stefanović attended the Belgrade Sports Gymnasium.

== College career ==
=== Utah Utes (2021-23) ===
In his freshman season with the Utah Utes, Stefanović played in all 31 games while starting in 18 of them. On January 24, 2022, Stefanovič was awarded the Pac-12 Freshman of the Week honors, as he averaged 11 points, 3.7 rebounds, and 2.3 assists that week for the Utes. At the end of the season, Stefanovič was named on the Pac-12 All Freshman Team. He finished the season averaging 7.5 points, 2.8 rebounds, and 1.3 assists. In his sophomore season, Stefanovič played all 32 games, starting in 15 of them. He was one of the three players to average points in the double digits, averaging 10.3 points, 3.0 rebounds, and 2.7 assists per game. In three games, he scored above 20 points, with his career high being 26 against a loss to the Stanford Cardinal. Following his two seasons at Utah, Stefanovič entered the transfer portal.

=== UCLA (2023-25) ===
In April 2023, Stefanovič announced that he will be transferring to UCLA, where he will be playing for the UCLA Bruins. In his junior season, Stefanović started and played in all 33 games; in his senior season, he played in 34 games and only started in five of the games.

== Professional career ==
On 19 May 2019, Stefanović made his professional debut for Partizan in a Serbian SuperLeague match against Tamiš. Stefanović scored two points. He was part of the squad that won the Radivoj Korać Cup in 2020. On 6 March 2021, he scored his first ABA League points in a game against Cibona, hitting a long-range three-pointer at the halftime buzzer. Following the end of the season, Stefanovič committed to play college basketball for the Utah Utes after getting offers from Toledo, New Mexico, Stanford, USC, and South Florida.

After graduating and going undrafted in the 2025 NBA Draft, Stefanovič joined the Orlando Magic for the 2025 NBA Summer League in Las Vegas. After not making the final cut, Stefanović joined the FMP of the Serbian League and the ABA League.

== National team career ==
He represented the Serbia U19 national team at the 2021 FIBA Under-19 Basketball World Cup. Over seven tournament games, Stefanović averaged 12.4 points, 4.3 rebounds, and 2.4 assists per game.

== Career statistics ==
Legend
GP	Games played	GS	Games started	MPG	Minutes per game
FG%	Field goal percentage	3P%	3-point field goal percentage	FT%	Free throw percentage
RPG	Rebounds per game	APG	Assists per game	SPG	Steals per game
BPG	Blocks per game	PPG	Points per game	**Bold**	Career high

=== College ===
Year	Team	GP	GS	MPG	FG%	3P%	FT%	RPG	APG	SPG	BPG	PPG
2021–22	Utah	31	18	25.1	.362	.308	.838	2.8	1.3	.4	—	7.5
2022–23	Utah	32	15	28.3	.371	.359	.868	3.0	**2.7**	**1.1**	.2	10.3
2023–24	UCLA	33	**33**	**34.6**	.385	**.389**	.868	**6.1**	1.6	**1.1**	.1	**11.5**
2024–25	UCLA	**34**	5	16.4	**.404**	.320	**.955**	1.9	.9	.5	—	4.7
Career		130	71	26.0	.378	.351	.869	3.5	1.6	.8	.1	8.5

=== EuroCup ===
Year	Team	GP	GS	MPG	FG%	3P%	FT%	RPG	APG	SPG	BPG	PPG	PIR
2020–21	Partizan	2	1	3.4	.0	.0	—	—	—	—	—	.0	-2.0

=== Domestic leagues ===
Year	Team	League	GP	MPG	FG%	3P%	FT%	RPG	APG	SPG	BPG	PPG
2018–19	(Serbia) Partizan	KLS	1	10.8	.200	.0	—	1.0	—	—	—	2.0
2019–20	(Serbia) Mladost Zemun	KLS	26	20.7	.362	.337	.750	2.0	1.3	.5	.1	7.0
2020–21	(Serbia) Partizan	ABA	5	3.5	.333	.250	—	.4	.6	—	—	1.0

== Personal life ==
Stefanovič has a younger sister, named Marjia. His father, Goran, stands at a height of 5’11, while his mother, Radmila, stands at 5’5.
