= 2023–24 Saint Francis Red Flash men's basketball team =

American college basketball season

2023–24 Saint Francis Red Flash men's basketball
- Conference: Northeast Conference
- Record: 8–22 (3–13 NEC)
- Head coach: Rob Krimmel (12th season)
- Associate head coach: Andrew Helton
- Assistant coaches: Eric Taylor; Luke McConnell
- Home arena: DeGol Arena

2023–24 Northeast Conference men's basketball standings
	Conf.				Overall
Team	W		L	PCT	W		L	PCT
Central Connecticut	13	–	3	.813	20	–	11	.645
Merrimack	13	–	3	.813	21	–	12	.636
Sacred Heart	10	–	6	.625	16	–	16	.500
Le Moyne*	9	–	7	.563	15	–	17	.469
Fairleigh Dickinson	9	–	7	.563	15	–	17	.469
Wagner †	7	–	9	.438	17	–	16	.515
LIU	6	–	10	.375	7	–	22	.241
Saint Francis	3	–	13	.188	8	–	22	.267
Stonehill*	2	–	14	.125	4	–	27	.129
† 2024 NEC tournament winner * ineligible for the 2024 NCAA tournament due to transition from Division II

The 2023–24 Saint Francis Red Flash men's basketball team represented Saint Francis University during the 2023–24 NCAA Division I men's basketball season. The Red Flash, led by 12th-year head coach Rob Krimmel, played their home games at the DeGol Arena in Loretto, Pennsylvania as members of the Northeast Conference.

== Previous season ==
The Red Flash finished the 2022–23 season 13–18, 9–7 in NEC play to finish in fourth place. They defeated Central Connecticut in the quarterfinals of the NEC tournament, before falling to Fairleigh Dickinson in the semifinals.

== Preseason polls ==
=== Northeast Conference poll ===
The Northeast Conference released its preseason coaches' poll on October 24, 2023. The Red Flash were picked to finish eighth in the conference.

Rank	Team
1.	Sacred Heart (7)
2.	Central Connecticut (1)
3.	Fairleigh Dickinson (1)
4.	Merrimack
5.	Wagner
6.	Stonehill
7.	LIU
8.	Saint Francis
9.	Le Moyne

() first place votes

=== Preseason All-Conference Team ===
No Red Flash were selected as a member of the NEC Preseason All-Conference Team.

== Roster ==
2023–24 Saint Francis Red Flash men's basketball team
Players
Coaches

Pos.	#	Name	Height	Weight	Year	Previous school	Hometown
G	0	Cam Gregory	6 ft 5 in (1.96 m)	165 lb (75 kg)	So	Steward School	Accokeek, Maryland
G	1	Braylen Blue	6 ft 5 in (1.96 m)	180 lb (82 kg)	Fr	James Madison Memorial High School	Sun Prairie, Wisconsin
G	2	Aaron "Ace" Talbert	6 ft 0 in (1.83 m)	185 lb (84 kg)	Fr	Combine Academy	Wyandanch, New York
F	3	Miles Webb	6 ft 8 in (2.03 m)	190 lb (86 kg)	So	St. Stephen's & St. Agnes School	Arlington, Virginia
G	4	Carlos Lopez Jr.	6 ft 2 in (1.88 m)	170 lb (77 kg)	Fr	Feltrim Academy	Egg Harbor, New Jersey
F	5	Eli Wilborn	6 ft 8 in (2.03 m)	215 lb (98 kg)	Fr	South Kent School	Middletown, Connecticut
G	11	Chris Moncrief	6 ft 6 in (1.98 m)	190 lb (86 kg)	So	Evansville	Turtle Creek, Pennsylvania
G	13	Blaze Angellotti	6 ft 4 in (1.93 m)	195 lb (88 kg)	Fr	Bald Eagle Area High School	Julian, Pennsylvania
G	14	Bobby Rosenberger III	6 ft 5 in (1.96 m)	205 lb (93 kg)	Fr	Perkiomen School	Quakertown, Pennsylvania
F	15	Aaron Humphrey Jr.	6 ft 7 in (2.01 m)	210 lb (95 kg)	Fr	Don Bosco Institute	Indianapolis, Indiana
G	20	Brendan Scanlon	5 ft 8 in (1.73 m)	175 lb (79 kg)	Jr	Saint Joseph's	State College, Pennsylvania
F	21	Gestin Liberis	6 ft 9 in (2.06 m)	215 lb (98 kg)	So	George School	Havertown, Pennsylvania
G	22	Ryen Gresko	5 ft 11 in (1.8 m)	170 lb (77 kg)	Fr	Penns Manor High School	Penn Run, Pennsylvania
G	23	Wisler Sanon II	6 ft 4 in (1.93 m)	190 lb (86 kg)	So	Paul VI High School	Sicklerville, New Jersey
G	24	Keshawn McNeill	6 ft 1 in (1.85 m)	180 lb (82 kg)	RS Fr	Zama American Middle High School	Camp Zama, Japan
G	30	KJ Swain Jr.	6 ft 0 in (1.83 m)	155 lb (70 kg)	Jr	Cincinnati Christian Schools	Hamilton, Ohio
F	32	Aidan Harris	6 ft 7 in (2.01 m)	205 lb (93 kg)	Fr	St. Mary's High School	Annapolis, Maryland
G	33	Will Helton	6 ft 4 in (1.93 m)	175 lb (79 kg)	Jr	Penn State DuBois	Hollidaysburg, Pennsylvania
F	42	Daric Danchanko	6 ft 8 in (2.03 m)	220 lb (100 kg)	So	Central Cambria High School	Johnstown, Pennsylvania

Head coach

- Rob Krimmel (Saint Francis (PA))

Assistant coach(es)

- Andrew Helton (Miami (OH))
- Eric Taylor (Saint Francis (PA))
- Luke McConnell (Saint Francis (PA))

Legend

- (C) Team captain
- (S) Suspended
- (I) Ineligible
- (W) Walk-on
- Injured
- Current redshirt

Roster
Last update: November 27, 2023

== Schedule and results ==
Date time, TV	Rank^{#}	Opponent^{#}	Result	Record	Site (attendance) city, state
Non-conference regular season
November 6, 2023*; 11:30 pm, P12N		at UCLA	L 44–75	0–1	Pauley Pavilion (6,783); Los Angeles, CA
November 9, 2023*; 10:00 pm, ESPN+		at San Francisco	L 52–84	0–2	War Memorial Gymnasium; San Francisco, CA
November 11, 2023*; 7:00 pm, ESPN+		at Santa Clara	L 59–82	0–3	Leavey Center (1,245); Santa Clara, CA
November 14, 2023*; 7:00 pm, B1G		at Penn State	L 53–83	0–4	Bryce Jordan Center (7,546); University Park, PA
November 20, 2023*; 7:00 pm, NEC Front Row		Pitt–Greensburg	W 77–63	1–4	DeGol Arena (623); Loretto, PA
November 22, 2023*; 7:00 pm, NEC Front Row		Franciscan	W 107–54	2–4	DeGol Arena (341); Loretto, PA
November 25, 2023*; 4:00 pm, NEC Front Row		Niagara	L 61–69	2–5	DeGol Arena (351); Loretto, PA
November 29, 2023*; 7:00 pm, ESPN+		at Lehigh	W 62–61	3–5	Stabler Arena (867); Bethlehem, PA
December 2, 2023*; 2:00 pm, ESPN+		at American	W 75–73	4–5	Bender Arena (692); Washington, D.C.
December 10, 2023*; 5:00 pm, ESPN+		at Iona	L 54–61	4–6	Hynes Athletics Center (1,288); New Rochelle, NY
December 15, 2023*; 7:00 pm, NEC Front Row		Mount St. Mary's	L 65–72	4–7	DeGol Arena (502); Loretto, PA
December 20, 2023*; 7:00 pm, NEC Front Row		Robert Morris	L 73–75	4–8	DeGol Arena (336); Loretto, PA
December 30, 2023*; 4:00 pm, NEC Front Row		Campbell	W 78–76	5–8	DeGol Arena (603); Loretto, PA
NEC regular season
January 4, 2024; 11:30 am, NEC Front Row		at Sacred Heart	L 67–79	5–9 (0–1)	William H. Pitt Center (2,000); Fairfield, CT
January 6, 2024; 1:00 pm, NEC Front Row		at Wagner	L 56–71	5–10 (0–2)	Spiro Sports Center (989); Staten Island, NY
January 13, 2024; 4:00 pm, NEC Front Row		Central Connecticut	L 61–75	5–11 (0–3)	DeGol Arena (510); Loretto, PA
January 15, 2024; 7:00 pm, NEC Front Row		Fairleigh Dickinson	L 71–81	5–12 (0–4)	DeGol Arena (590); Loretto, PA
January 19, 2024; 7:00 pm, NEC Front Row		LIU	W 72–66	6–12 (1–4)	DeGol Arena (640); Loretto, PA
January 21, 2024; 2:00 pm, NEC Front Row		at Le Moyne	L 57–94	6–13 (1–5)	Ted Grant Court (794); DeWitt, NY
January 25, 2024; 7:00 pm, NEC Front Row		Sacred Heart	W 75–71	7–13 (2–5)	DeGol Arena (725); Loretto, PA
January 27, 2024; 4:00 pm, NEC Front Row		Merrimack	L 55–74	7–14 (2–6)	DeGol Arena (882); Loretto, PA
February 1, 2024; 7:00 pm, NEC Front Row		at Central Connecticut	L 62–63	7–15 (2–7)	William H. Detrick Gymnasium (1,301); New Britain, CT
February 3, 2024; 7:00 pm, NEC Front Row		at LIU	L 67–70	7–16 (2–8)	Steinberg Wellness Center (792); Brooklyn, NY
February 10, 2024; 4:00 pm, NEC Front Row		Stonehill	W 72–63	8–16 (3–8)	DeGol Arena (809); Loretto, PA
February 15, 2024; 7:00 pm, NEC Front Row		Wagner	L 63–65 ^{OT}	8–17 (3–9)	DeGol Arena (703); Loretto, PA
February 17, 2024; 1:00 pm, NEC Front Row		at Fairleigh Dickinson	L 74–93	8–18 (3–10)	Bogota Savings Bank Center (473); Hackensack, NJ
February 22, 2024; 7:00 pm, NEC Front Row		at Merrimack	L 60–71	8–19 (3–11)	Lawler Arena (1,346); North Andover, MA
February 24, 2024; 2:00 pm, NEC Front Row		at Stonehill	L 63–72	8–20 (3–12)	Merkert Gymnasium (1,022); Easton, MA
March 2, 2024; 4:00 pm, NEC Front Row		Le Moyne	L 58–74	8–21 (3–13)	DeGol Arena (727); Loretto, PA
NEC Tournament
March 6, 2024; 7:00 pm, NEC Front Row	(8)	at (1) Central Connecticut; Quarterfinals	L 62–71	8–22	William H. Detrick Gymnasium (2,412); New Britain, CT
*Non-conference game. ^{#}Rankings from AP Poll. (#) Tournament seedings in parentheses. All times are in Eastern.
