= 2024 Northeast Conference men's basketball tournament =

- 2024 tournament logo
- Classification: Division I
- Season: 2023–24
- Teams: 8
- Site: Campus sites
- Finals site: Lawler Arena; North Andover, Massachusetts
- Champions: Wagner (2nd title)
- Winning coach: Donald Copeland (1st title)
- MVP: Tahron Allen (Wagner)
- Attendance: 11,571 (total); 2,827 (championship)
- Top scorer: Tahron Allen (Wagner) (55 points)
- Television: ESPN2, YES, ESPN+, NEC Front Row

2023–24 Northeast Conference men's basketball standings
	Conf.				Overall
Team	W		L	PCT	W		L	PCT
Central Connecticut	13	–	3	.813	20	–	11	.645
Merrimack	13	–	3	.813	21	–	12	.636
Sacred Heart	10	–	6	.625	16	–	16	.500
Le Moyne*	9	–	7	.563	15	–	17	.469
Fairleigh Dickinson	9	–	7	.563	15	–	17	.469
Wagner †	7	–	9	.438	17	–	16	.515
LIU	6	–	10	.375	7	–	22	.241
Saint Francis	3	–	13	.188	8	–	22	.267
Stonehill*	2	–	14	.125	4	–	27	.129
† 2024 NEC tournament winner * ineligible for the 2024 NCAA tournament due to transition from Division II

The 2024 Northeast Conference Men's Basketball Tournament was the postseason men's basketball tournament for the Northeast Conference for the 2023–24 NCAA Division I men's basketball season. The tournament took place on three dates between March 6 and 12, 2024, and all tournament games were played in the home arenas of the higher-seeded school. The winner, Wagner, received the conference's automatic bid to the 2024 NCAA tournament.

Merrimack was the defending champion. Due to Merrimack's ineligibility as a team transitioning from Division II, Fairleigh Dickinson represented the conference in the 2023 NCAA tournament and advanced to the second round.

== Seeds ==
The top eight teams in the conference regular-season standings qualified. Effective for the 2023–24 academic year, NEC teams transitioning from Division II are eligible for the NEC tournament during the entirety of their transition periods. If a reclassifying institution wins the NEC tournament championship, the tournament runner-up will be awarded the NEC's automatic bid to the NCAA tournament. If two reclassifying teams reach the final of the NEC tournament, the conference will stage an automatic qualifier game between the two non-advancing semifinalists. Previously, transitioning NEC teams were eligible for the conference tournament only during their third and fourth transition years. The rule change results in Stonehill and Le Moyne being eligible for the 2024 NEC tournament, since Stonehill is in its second transition year, and Le Moyne is in its first.

Teams were seeded by record within the conference, with a tiebreaker system to seed teams with identical conference records.

Seed	School	Conf.	Tiebreaker
1	Central Connecticut	13–3	2–0 vs. Sacred Heart
2	Merrimack	13–3	1–1 vs. Sacred Heart
3	Sacred Heart	10–6	
4	Le Moyne	9–7	2–2 vs. Central Connecticut/Merrimack
5	Fairleigh Dickinson	9–7	0–4 vs. Central Connecticut/Merrimack
6	Wagner	7–9	
7	LIU	6–10	
8	Saint Francis	3–13	
DNQ	Stonehill	2–14	

== Schedule ==
Game	Time*	Matchup	Score	Television	Attendance
Quarterfinals – Wednesday, March 6
1	7:00 pm	No. 8 Saint Francis at No. 1 Central Connecticut	62–71	NEC Front Row	2,412
2	7:00 pm	No. 7 LIU at No. 2 Merrimack	66–72	NEC Front Row	1,076
3	7:00 pm	No. 6 Wagner at No. 3 Sacred Heart	60–57	NEC Front Row	361
4	7:00 pm	No. 5 Fairleigh Dickinson at No. 4 Le Moyne	61–82	NEC Front Row	861
Semifinals – Saturday, March 9
5	12:00 pm	No. 4 Le Moyne at No. 2 Merrimack	51–61	YES, ESPN+	1,565
6	2:00 pm	No. 6 Wagner at No. 1 Central Connecticut	66–56	YES, ESPN+	2,469
Championship – Tuesday, March 12
7	7:00 pm	No. 6 Wagner at No. 2 Merrimack	54–47	ESPN2	2,827
*Game times in ET. Rankings denote tournament seed

== Tournament notes ==
=== Quarterfinals ===
Top-seeded Central Connecticut found themselves trailing Saint Francis by as many as eight points at 57–49, before going on an 8–0 run to tie the score at 57. Moments later, a three-pointer by Jordan Jones, who finished with 18 points, gave the Blue Devils a 60–59 lead. After several lead changes, a jump shot by Jones gave Central Connecticut the lead for good with 3:29 to play. Allan Jeanne-Rose had a career-high 28 points and added five rebounds for the Blue Devils. Eli Wilborn scored 19 points and had six rebounds for the Red Flash.

Merrimack survived a difficult test from LIU in the NEC quarterfinals, securing a 72–66 victory to advance. The game remained close throughout, until the Warriors went on a 9–0 run to take a 10-point lead with less than four minutes to play and seemingly put the game away. However, the Sharks battled back and got within a point of the lead in the final minute. Merrimack iced the game at the free-throw line and by clamping down on defense in the closing minute. For the game, the Warriors forced 18 turnovers, leading to 27 points. Jordan Derkack had his third double-double of the season for Merrimack with 23 points, 10 rebounds, five assists and three steals. Adam "Budd" Clark added 18 points for the Warriors. Tai Strickland and Andre Washington each had 18 points and two steals for LIU.

Tahron Allen's go-ahead layup with 46 seconds remaining fueled Wagner to a 60–57 upset victory at Sacred Heart. The game was close throughout, and neither team led by more than three points during the final 11:13. After a pair of free throws by Melvin Council Jr. gave the Seahawks a three-point lead in the closing seconds, and the Pioneers' three-point attempt at the buzzer was off the mark. Wagner held the lead for 35:03. Allen led Wagner with 22 points and added six rebounds. Alex Sobel had 15 points, 11 rebounds and two blocked shots for Sacred Heart. The Seahawks were the first road team to win an NEC quarterfinal game since 2019.

Powered by Luke Sutherland's 22 points, Le Moyne cruised to an 82–61 wire-to-wire victory over Fairleigh Dickinson. The Dolphins opened the game with three three-pointers to take a 9–0 lead just 1:45 into the contest. The Knights settled down, and Le Moyne was up, 42–34, at intermission. Leading 46–40 in the second half, the Dolphins went on an 11–0 run over 2:09 to take a 57–40 lead with 15:42 remaining. Fairleigh Dickinson got no closer than 12 points behind the rest of the way. Darrick Jones Jr. scored 17 points for Le Moyne. Sean Moore scored 16 points and added eight rebounds and two steals for the Knights.

=== Semifinals ===
After Le Moyne jumped out to an early 13–4 lead, Merrimack's defense got the Warriors back into the game, and a 19–3 run in the later part of the first half helped them build a 28–20 lead at intermission. The Dolphins cut the deficit to three with 14:47 to play on a put-back by Kaiyem Cleary. The teams traded three-pointers over the next three minutes, until Samba Diallo's layups on consecutive possessions extended Merrimack's lead to seven points. The Dolphins responded with a 6–2 run to get within three points at 40–37 with 8:14 to play. An 8–2 Warriors run gave them a nine-point lead with 6:45 on the clock, but Le Moyne responded with a pair of three-pointers by Luke Sutherland to pull within three again with 5:42 to play. After each team had two empty possessions over the next two minutes, Bryan Etumnu was fouled on a layup and completed the three-point play, sparking a 9–2 Merrimack run that put the game away. The Warriors' 61–51 victory put them in the NEC tournament final for the second straight year. Adam "Budd" Clark scored 24 points to lead Merrimack. Sutherland had 23 points and eight rebounds for Le Moyne.

Julian Brown scored 20 points to lead Wagner past top-seeded Central Connecticut, 66–56. After the Seahawks took a 28–23 halftime lead, the Blue Devils battled back and tied the game at 39 with 9:06 remaining, but Central Connecticut was never able to pull in front. After the Blue Devils got within 48–45, Melvin Council Jr., who finished with 12 points, scored the next two baskets to extend Wagner's lead to seven points with 2:57 on the clock. Javier Ezquerra scored to give the Seahawks a 54–48 lead with 2:23 to play. After a Jordan Jones three-pointer got the Blue Devils within five points at 61–56, the Seahawks, who were down to five dressed players after Council and Keyontae Lewis fouled out, went 5 for 6 from the free-throw line in the final 30 seconds to ice the game. Lewis scored 12 points and added nine rebounds for Wagner. Jones had 15 points for Central Connecticut.

=== Final ===
Wagner became the first team to win three road games and take the NEC tournament title and, as the no. 6 seed, matched the lowest seeded team to ever capture the NEC crown with a 54–47 victory at Merrimack. Tournament MVP Tahron Allen scored 22 points for the Seahawks and gave them an 11-point lead at 41–30 with his three-pointer with 12:38 to play. The Warriors responded with a 13–0 run, keyed by two Jordan McCoy three-pointers and capped by Bryan Etumnu's three-pointer, to take a 43–41 lead with 8:07 to play. With the sellout crowd in a frenzy, Wagner answered by holding Merrimack scoreless over the next six minutes while scoring eight points to take a 49–43 lead with 2:18 to play. After Allen's free throws put the Seahawks up, 51–45, with 1:10 on the clock, the Warriors' three-point attempts were all off the mark. McCoy hit a pair of free throws with 25 seconds to go to bring Merrimack within four points, but Javier Ezquerra sank a pair of charity tosses four seconds later to ice the game. Melvin Council Jr. had 12 points, and Keyontae Lewis scored eight points and pulled down 12 rebounds for the Seahawks. Devon Savage had 16 points and six rebounds for the Warriors, and McCoy added 11 points. NEC Player of the Year, Jordan Derkack, played through an injury he suffered in Merrimack's semifinal game but was held to only four points. Merrimack was held to just one field goal over the final 8:07 and shot 30% from the floor, including 16% (10 for 38) from beyond the arc.

== Bracket ==
Teams were reseeded after each round with highest remaining seeds receiving home-court advantage.

Quarterfinals; Wednesday, March 6 NEC Front Row
1	Central Connecticut	71
8	Saint Francis	62
4	Le Moyne	82
5	Fairleigh Dickinson	61
(Pairings are reseeded after the first round)
2	Merrimack	72
7	LIU	66
3	Sacred Heart	57
6	Wagner	60

Semifinals; Saturday, March 9 YES/ESPN+
1	Central Connecticut	56
6	Wagner	66
2	Merrimack	61
4	Le Moyne	51

Championship; Tuesday, March 12; ESPN2
6	Wagner	54
2	Merrimack	47

== Game summaries ==
All times are in Eastern Time (UTC−5 on March 6 and 9 and UTC-4 on March 12)

=== Quarterfinals ===
NEC Front Row

March 6
7:00 p.m.

Box

No. 8 Saint Francis 62, No. 1 Central Connecticut 71
Scoring by half: 32–34, 30–37
Pts: Wilborn 19; Rebs: Wilborn 6 Asts: Rosenberger 4	Pts: Jeanne-Rose 28; Rebs: Amos, Breland, Jeanne-Rose, Momoh 5 Asts: Ostrowsky, Sweatman 2
Central Connecticut advances to NEC semifinals

William H. Detrick Gymnasium
New Britain, Connecticut
Attendance: 2,412
Referees: Craig Lastres, Jason Stallworth, Guy Pagano

NEC Front Row

March 6
7:00 p.m.

Box

No. 7 LIU 66, No. 2 Merrimack 72
Scoring by half: 39–43, 27–29
Pts: Tai Strickland, Washington 18; Rebs: Greene 16; Asts: Greene, Tai Strickland 3	Pts: Derkack 23; Rebs: Derkack 10; Asts: Derkack 5
Merrimack advances to NEC semifinals

Lawler Arena
North Andover, Massachusetts
Attendance: 1,076

NEC Front Row

March 6
7:00 p.m.

Box

No. 6 Wagner 60, No. 3 Sacred Heart 57
Scoring by half: 35–31, 25–26
Pts: Allen 22; Rebs: Council 9 Asts: Ezquerra 5	Pts: Sobel 15; Rebs: Sobel 11; Asts: Carpenter, Galette, McGee, Reilly, Sixsmith 2
Wagner advances to NEC semifinals

William H. Pitt Center
Fairfield, Connecticut
Attendance: 361
Referees: Dave Fernandez, Phil Sallustio, Mile Palau

NEC Front Row

March 6
7:00 p.m.

Box

No. 5 Fairleigh Dickinson 61, No. 4 Le Moyne 82
Scoring by half: 34–42, 27–40
Pts: Moore 16; Rebs: Moore 8 Asts: Almonor, Brown, Emanuel, Munden 2	Pts: Sutherland 22; Rebs: Owens 8 Asts: DePersia 8
Le Moyne advances to NEC semifinals

Ted Grant Court
DeWitt, New York
Attendance: 861
Referees: Jack Loughran, Vasili Mallios, Edward Corbett Jr.

=== Semifinals ===
YES, ESPN+

March 9
12:00 noon

Box

No. 4 Le Moyne 51, No. 2 Merrimack 61
Scoring by half: 20–28, 31–33
Pts: Sutherland 23; Rebs: Sutherland 8 Asts: DePersia, Jones, McClure, Sutherland 2	Pts: Clark 24; Rebs: Derkack, Etumnu 6 Asts: Derkack 7
Merrimack advances to NEC final

Lawler Arena
North Andover, Massachusetts
Attendance: 1,565

YES, ESPN+

March 9
2:00 p.m.

Box

No. 6 Wagner 66, No. 1 Central Connecticut 56
Scoring by half: 28–23, 38–33
Pts: Brown 20; Rebs: Lewis 9 Asts: Ezquerra 5	Pts: Jones 15; Rebs: Ostrowsky 7 Asts: Amos, Jones 3
Wagner advances to NEC final

William H. Detrick Gymnasium
New Britain, Connecticut
Attendance: 2,449
Referees: Riley McGraw, Raymond Downs, Greg Moyer

=== Final ===
ESPN2

March 12
7:00 p.m.

Box

No. 6 Wagner 54, No. 2 Merrimack 47
Scoring by half: 29–25, 25–22
Pts: Allen 22; Rebs: Lewis 12; Asts: Allen, Brown 3	Pts: Savage 16; Rebs: Savage 6 Asts: Clark 7
Wagner wins NEC championship

Lawler Arena
North Andover, Massachusetts
Attendance: 2,847

== Awards and honors ==
Tournament MVP: Tahron Allen, Wagner

NEC All-Tournament Team
- Tahron Allen, Wagner
- Melvin Council Jr., Wagner
- Adam "Budd" Clark, Merrimack
- Devon Savage, Merrimack
- Luke Sutherland, Le Moyne

== Statistics ==
Individual scoring
Rk	Player	School	G	Pts	PPG
1	Luke Sutherland	Le Moyne	2	45	22.5
2	Allan Jeanne-Rose	Central Connecticut	2	38	19.0
2	Eli Wilborn	Saint Francis	1	19	19.0
4	Tahron Allen	Wagner	3	55	18.3
5	Tai Strickland	LIU	1	18	18.0
5	Andre Washington	LIU	1	18	18.0
7	Adam "Budd" Clark	Merrimack	3	50	16.7
8	Jordan Jones	Central Connecticut	2	33	16.5
9	Sean Moore	Fairleigh Dickinson	1	16	16.0
10	Alex Sobel	Sacred Heart	1	15	15.0

Individual field-goal percentage
Rk	Player	Team	G	FGM	FGA	FG%
1	Aidan Harris	Saint Francis	1	4	5	80.0%
2	Eli Wilborn	Saint Francis	1	7	9	77.8%
3	Gestin Liberis	Saint Francis	1	5	7	71.4%
4	Andre Washington	LIU	1	6	9	66.7%
5	Allan Jeanne-Rose	Central Connecticut	2	13	20	65.0%
6	Keyontae Lewis	Wagner	3	12	19	63.2%
7	Joey Reilly	Sacred Heart	1	3	5	60.0%
8	Darrick Jones Jr.	Le Moyne	2	8	15	53.3%
9	Jayden Brown	Central Connecticut	2	6	12	50.0%
9	Sean Moore	Fairleigh Dickinson	1	6	12	50.0%
9	Aidan Carpenter	Sacred Heart	1	3	6	50.0%

Individual three-point field-goal percentage
Rk	Player	Team	G	3FGM	3FGA	3FG%
1	Aidan Harris	Saint Francis	1	2	2	100.0%
1	Eric Acker	LIU	1	1	1	100.0%
1	Davin Francis	Fairleigh Dickinson	1	1	1	100.0%
1	Mike Sixsmith	Sacred Heart	1	1	1	100.0%
1	Andre Washington	LIU	1	1	1	100.0%
1	Eli Wilborn	Saint Francis	1	1	1	100.0%
7	Jacob O'Connell	Merrimack	3	5	7	71.4%
8	Luke Sutherland	Le Moyne	2	7	12	58.3%
9	Allan Jeanne-Rose	Central Connecticut	2	4	7	57.1%
9	Darrick Jones Jr.	Le Moyne	2	4	7	57.1%

Individual free-throw percentage
Rk	Player	Team	G	FTM	FTA	FT%
1	Luke Sutherland	Le Moyne	2	8	8	100.0%
1	Andre Washington	LIU	1	5	5	100.0%
1	Tai Strickland	LIU	1	4	4	100.0%
1	Terrence Brown	Fairleigh Dickinson	1	2	2	100.0%
1	Joey Reilly	Sacred Heart	1	2	2	100.0%
6	Darrick Jones Jr.	Le Moyne	2	8	9	88.9%
7	Adam "Budd" Clark	Merrimack	3	14	16	87.5%
8	Joe Munden Jr.	Fairleigh Dickinson	1	10	12	83.3%
9	Jordan Derkack	Merrimack	3	9	11	81.8%
10	Julian Brown	Wagner	3	8	10	80.0%
10	Allan Jeanne-Rose	Central Connecticut	2	8	10	80.0%

Individual rebounding
Rk	Player	Team	G	ORB	DRB	Tot	RPG
1	RJ Greene	LIU	1	6	10	16	16.0
2	Alex Sobel	Sacred Heart	1	3	8	11	11.0
3	Keyontae Lewis	Wagner	3	4	22	26	8.7
4	Sean Moore	Fairleigh Dickinson	1	1	7	8	8.0
4	Nico Galette	Sacred Heart	1	2	6	8	8.0
6	Nikola Djapa	LIU	1	4	3	7	7.0
6	Gestin Liberis	Saint Francis	1	1	6	7	7.0
8	Jordan Derkack	Merrimack	3	2	18	20	6.7
9	Kaiyem Cleary	Le Moyne	2	2	11	13	6.5
10	Tahron Allen	Wagner	3	7	11	18	6.0
10	Luke Sutherland	Le Moyne	2	0	12	12	6.0
10	Jo'el Emanuel	Fairleigh Dickinson	1	4	2	6	6.0
10	Eli Wilborn	Saint Francis	1	1	5	6	6.0

Individual assists
Rk	Player	Team	G	A	APG
1	Mike DePersia	Le Moyne	2	10	5.0
2	Adam "Budd" Clark	Merrimack	3	14	4.7
2	Jordan Derkack	Merrimack	3	14	4.7
4	Bobby Rosenberger	Saint Francis	1	4	4.0
5	Javier Ezquerra	Wagner	3	11	3.7
6	RJ Greene	LIU	1	3	3.0
6	Carlos Lopez Jr.	Saint Francis	1	3	3.0
6	Tai Strickland	LIU	1	3	3.0
6	Aaron Talbert	Saint Francis	1	3	3.0
10	Julian Brown	Wagner	3	7	2.3

Individual blocks
Rk	Player	Team	G	Blk	BPG
1	Bryan Etumnu	Merrimack	3	8	2.7
2	Jayden Brown	Central Connecticut	2	5	2.5
3	Alex Sobel	Sacred Heart	1	2	2.0
4	Keyontae Lewis	Wagner	3	3	1.0
4	Allan Jeanne-Rose	Central Connecticut	2	2	1.0
4	Ocypher Owens	Le Moyne	2	2	1.0
4	Ansley Almonor	Fairleigh Dickinson	1	1	1.0
4	CJ Delancy	LIU	1	1	1.0
4	Jo'el Emanuel	Fairleigh Dickinson	1	1	1.0
4	Nico Galette	Sacred Heart	1	1	1.0
4	Kyle McGee	Sacred Heart	1	1	1.0
4	Miles Webb	Saint Francis	1	1	1.0

Individual steals
Rk	Player	Team	G	Stl	SPG
1	RJ Greene	LIU	1	3	3.0
1	Kyle McGee	Sacred Heart	1	3	3.0
1	Jason Steele	LIU	1	3	3.0
4	Adam "Budd" Clark	Merrimack	3	7	2.3
5	Jordan Derkack	Merrimack	3	6	2.0
5	Kaiyem Cleary	Le Moyne	2	4	2.0
5	Mike DePersia	Le Moyne	2	4	2.0
5	Nate McClure	Le Moyne	2	4	2.0
5	Aidan Harris	Saint Francis	1	2	2.0
5	Sean Moore	Fairleigh Dickinson	1	2	2.0
5	Brayden Reynolds	Fairleigh Dickinson	1	2	2.0
5	Tai Strickland	LIU	1	2	2.0
5	Andre Washington	LIU	1	2	2.0
