= 2023–24 Fairleigh Dickinson Knights men's basketball team =

American college basketball season

2023–24 Fairleigh Dickinson Knights men's basketball
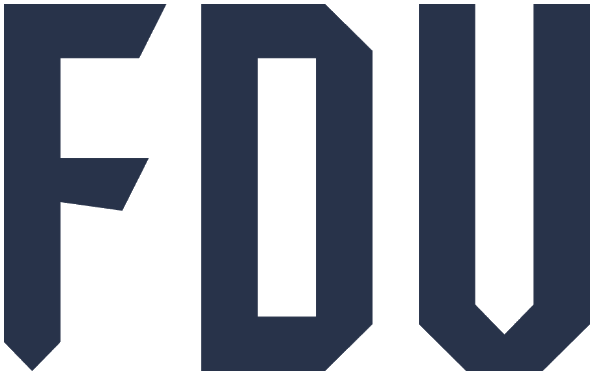
- Conference: Northeast Conference
- Record: 15–17 (9–7 NEC)
- Head coach: Jack Castleberry (1st season)
- Assistant coaches: Josh Hayes; Tom Kiely; Kevin Zabo
- Home arena: Bogota Savings Bank Center

2023–24 Northeast Conference men's basketball standings
	Conf.				Overall
Team	W		L	PCT	W		L	PCT
Central Connecticut	13	–	3	.813	20	–	11	.645
Merrimack	13	–	3	.813	21	–	12	.636
Sacred Heart	10	–	6	.625	16	–	16	.500
Le Moyne*	9	–	7	.563	15	–	17	.469
Fairleigh Dickinson	9	–	7	.563	15	–	17	.469
Wagner †	7	–	9	.438	17	–	16	.515
LIU	6	–	10	.375	7	–	22	.241
Saint Francis	3	–	13	.188	8	–	22	.267
Stonehill*	2	–	14	.125	4	–	27	.129
† 2024 NEC tournament winner * ineligible for the 2024 NCAA tournament due to transition from Division II

The 2023–24 Fairleigh Dickinson Knights men's basketball team represented Fairleigh Dickinson University in the 2023–24 NCAA Division I men's basketball season. The Knights, led by first-year head coach Jack Castleberry, played their home games in Hackensack, New Jersey as members of the Northeast Conference (NEC). During the season, on January 18, 2024, the name of the Knights' home venue was changed from the Rothman Center to the Bogota Savings Bank Center.

== Preseason polls ==
=== Northeast Conference poll ===
The Northeast Conference released its preseason coaches' poll on October 24, 2023. The Knights were picked to finish in third in the conference.

Rank	Team
1.	Sacred Heart (7)
2.	Central Connecticut (1)
3.	Fairleigh Dickinson (1)
4.	Merrimack
5.	Wagner
6.	Stonehill
7.	LIU
8.	Saint Francis
9.	Le Moyne

() first-place votes

=== Preseason All-Conference Team ===
Junior forward Ansley Almonor was selected as a member of the NEC Preseason All-Conference Team.

== Previous season ==
The Knights finished the 2022–23 season 17–14, 10–6 in NEC play, to finish in a tie for second place. As the number two seed in the NEC tournament, they defeated St. Francis Brooklyn and Saint Francis (PA) to advance to the championship game where they lost to Merrimack. However, because Merrimack was in a transition period from Division II to Division I and ineligible for the NCAA tournament, the Knights received the conference's automatic bid to the NCAA tournament as the No. 16 seed in the East region. In the First Four, they defeated Texas Southern to advance to the first round. There they became only the second No. 16 seed ever to upset a No. 1 seed by defeating Purdue. The Knights would then go on to lose in the second round to Florida Atlantic.

On March 21, 2023, head coach Tobin Anderson left the school to become the head coach at Iona. The same day, the school promoted assistant coach Jack Castleberry to head coach.

== Roster ==
2023–24 Fairleigh Dickinson Knights men's basketball team
Players
Coaches

Pos.	#	Name	Height	Weight	Year	Previous school	Hometown
G	0	Jameel Morris	6 ft 1 in (1.85 m)	177 lb (80 kg)	Fr	Our Saviour Lutheran School	Willingboro, NJ
G	1	Joe Jr. Munden	6 ft 3 in (1.91 m)	199 lb (90 kg)	Sr	Monsignor Scanlan High School	Harlem, NY
G	2	Terrence Brown	6 ft 3 in (1.91 m)	158 lb (72 kg)	Fr	Golden State Prep	Minneapolis, MN
G	3	Heru Bligen	6 ft 2 in (1.88 m)	183 lb (83 kg)	GS	Garden City Community College	Glenn Dale, MD
F	5	Ansley Almonor	6 ft 7 in (2.01 m)	219 lb (99 kg)	Jr	Our Saviour Lutheran School	Spring Valley, NY
F	11	Sean Moore	6 ft 5 in (1.96 m)	189 lb (86 kg)	Sr	St. Thomas Aquinas College	Columbus, OH
G	12	Sébastien Lamaute	6 ft 1 in (1.85 m)	198 lb (90 kg)	GS	McGill	Saint-Bruno-de-Montarville, QC
F	13	Jo'el Emanuel	6 ft 6 in (1.98 m)	196 lb (89 kg)	So	Millbrook High School	Suffern, NY
G	14	DeVante Jamison	5 ft 8 in (1.73 m)	160 lb (73 kg)	GS	St. Thomas Aquinas College	Dorchester, MA
F	20	Davin Francis	6 ft 6 in (1.98 m)	174 lb (79 kg)	Fr	MacDuffie School	Brooklyn, NY
F	21	Cameron Tweedy	6 ft 4 in (1.93 m)	222 lb (101 kg)	Jr	State Fair Community College	Waldorf, MD
G	22	Thomas Jr. Sutter	6 ft 2 in (1.88 m)	176 lb (80 kg)	Fr	St. Thomas More School	White Plains, NY
G	24	Brayden Reynolds	6 ft 1 in (1.85 m)	194 lb (88 kg)	So	Western Reserve Academy	Pittsburgh, PA
G	32	Tyler Jamison	6 ft 4 in (1.93 m)	193 lb (88 kg)	Fr	Port Huron Northern High School	Port Huron, MI
C	35	Jacob Warren	6 ft 10 in (2.08 m)	214 lb (97 kg)	Fr	Calvary Christian Academy	Downingtown, PA

Head coach

- Jack Castleberry (VMI)

Assistant coach(es)

- Josh Hayes (Methodist)
- Tom Kiely (Seton Hall)
- Kevin Zabo (Kent State)

Legend

- (C) Team captain
- (S) Suspended
- (I) Ineligible
- (W) Walk-on
- Injured
- Current redshirt

Roster
Last update: November 26, 2023

== Schedule and results ==
Date time, TV	Rank^{#}	Opponent^{#}	Result	Record	Site (attendance) city, state
Regular season
November 6, 2023*; 7:30 p.m., ESPN+		at Buffalo	W 92–86	1–0	Alumni Arena (2,500); Amherst, NY
November 8, 2023*; 7:00 p.m., NEC Front Row		Penn State Brandywine	W 107–63	2–0	Rothman Center (570); Hackensack, NJ
November 11, 2023*; 4:00 p.m., FS2		at Seton Hall	L 55–85	2–1	Walsh Gymnasium (1,326); South Orange, NJ
November 15, 2023*; 7:00 p.m., SNY		Saint Peter's; Battle of Bracket Busters	W 71–70	3–1	Rothman Center (1,852); Hackensack, NJ
November 18, 2023*; 2:00 p.m., NEC Front Row		Penn State Schuylkill	W 124–66	4–1	Rothman Center (443); Hackensack, NJ
November 22, 2023*; 7:00 p.m., ESPN+		at Queens	L 84–97	4–2	Curry Arena (317); Charlotte, NC
November 25, 2023*; 4:00 p.m., ESPN+		vs. Jacksonville; Urban-Bennett Memorial Classic	L 90–91	4–3	UPMC Events Center (131); Moon Township, PA
November 26, 2023*; 2:00 p.m., ESPN+		at Robert Morris; Urban-Bennett Memorial Classic	L 86–97	4–4	UPMC Events Center (822); Moon Township, PA
November 30, 2023*; 7:00 p.m., SNY/ESPN+		at Fordham	L 52–80	4–5	Rose Hill Gymnasium (1,320); The Bronx, NY
December 2, 2023*; 3:30 p.m., ESPN+		at NJIT	W 71–68	5–5	Wellness and Events Center; Newark, NJ
December 8, 2023*; 7:00 p.m., ESPN+		at Manhattan	W 76–71	6–5	Draddy Gymnasium (1,293); Riverdale, NY
December 11, 2023*; 7:00 p.m., NEC Front Row		Columbia	L 83–87	6–6	Rothman Center (582); Hackensack, NJ
December 21, 2023*; 7:00 p.m., YES		Fairfield	L 69–92	6–7	Rothman Center (703); Hackensack, NJ
December 29, 2023*; 9:00 p.m., B1G		at No. 11 Illinois	L 71–104	6–8	State Farm Center (15,544); Champaign, IL
January 4, 2024; 7:00 p.m., NEC Front Row		at Merrimack	L 56–60	6–9 (0–1)	Lawler Arena (693); North Andover, MA
January 6, 2024; 2:00 p.m., YES		Le Moyne	L 63–74	6–10 (0–2)	Rothman Center (273); Hackensack, NJ
January 10, 2024*; 7:00 p.m., YES		Chicago State	L 74–75	6–11	Rothman Center (153); Hackensack, NJ
January 13, 2024; 1:00 p.m., YES		Stonehill	W 81–74	7–11 (1–2)	Rothman Center (223); Hackensack, NJ
January 15, 2024; 7:00 p.m., NEC Front Row		at Saint Francis (PA)	W 81–71	8–11 (2–2)	DeGol Arena (590); Loretto, PA
January 19, 2024; 5:00 p.m., NEC Front Row		at Stonehill	W 76–69	9–11 (3–2)	Merkert Gymnasium (223); Easton, MA
January 25, 2024; 5:00 p.m., ESPNU		Central Connecticut	L 60–76	9–12 (3–3)	Bogota Savings Bank Center (371); Hackensack, NJ
January 27, 2024; 2:00 p.m., NEC Front Row		Sacred Heart	W 93–91	10–12 (4–3)	Bogota Savings Bank Center (673); Hackensack, NJ
February 1, 2024; 7:00 p.m., YES		LIU	W 82–75	11–12 (5–3)	Bogota Savings Bank Center (557); Hackensack, NJ
February 8, 2024; 7:00 p.m., NEC Front Row		Wagner	L 62–66	11–13 (5–4)	Bogota Savings Bank Center (347); Hackensack, NJ
February 10, 2024; 1:00 p.m., NEC Front Row		at Central Connecticut	L 62–71	11–14 (5–5)	William H. Detrick Gymnasium (1,090); New Britain, CT
February 15, 2024; 7:00 p.m., NEC Front Row		at LIU	W 84–82 ^{OT}	12–14 (6–5)	Steinberg Wellness Center (251); Brooklyn, NY
February 17, 2024; 1:00 p.m., NEC Front Row		Saint Francis (PA)	W 93–74	13–14 (7–5)	Bogota Savings Bank Center (473); Hackensack, NJ
February 22, 2024; 7:00 p.m., NEC Front Row		at Sacred Heart	L 91–99	13–15 (7–6)	William H. Pitt Center (722); Fairfield, CT
February 24, 2024; 2:00 p.m., NEC Front Row		at Le Moyne	W 68–58	14–15 (8–6)	Ted Grant Court (558); DeWitt, NY
February 29, 2024; 7:00 p.m., NEC Front Row		Merrimack	L 55–74	14–16 (8–7)	Bogota Savings Bank Center (563); Hackensack, NJ
March 2, 2024; 4:30 p.m., NEC Front Row		at Wagner	W 57–54	15–16 (9–7)	Spiro Sports Center (1,486); Staten Island, NY
NEC tournament
March 6, 2024; 7:00 p.m., NEC Front Row	(5)	at (4) Le Moyne; Quarterfinals	L 61–82	15–17	Ted Grant Court (861); DeWitt, NY
*Non-conference game. ^{#}Rankings from AP poll. (#) Tournament seedings in parentheses. All times are in Eastern.
