= 2023–24 Central Connecticut Blue Devils men's basketball team =

American college basketball season

2023–24 Central Connecticut Blue Devils men's basketball
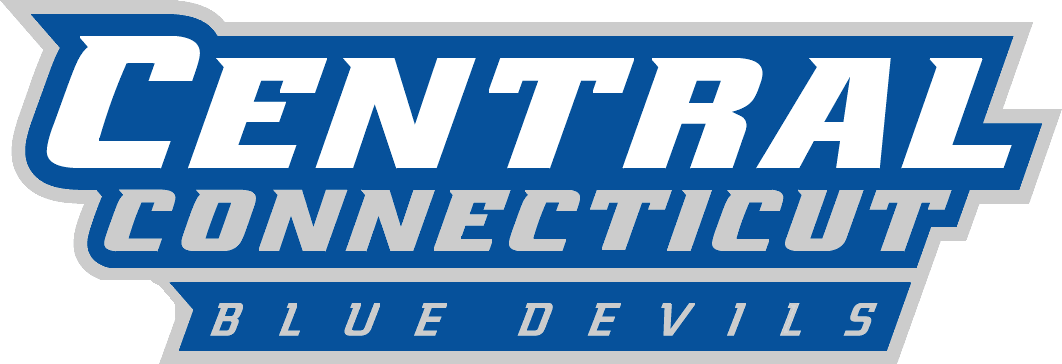

NEC regular-season co-champions
- Conference: Northeast Conference
- Record: 20–11 (13–3 NEC)
- Head coach: Patrick Sellers (3rd season)
- Assistant coaches: Ben Wood; Lenny Jefferson; Ryan Olander
- Home arena: William H. Detrick Gymnasium

2023–24 Northeast Conference men's basketball standings
	Conf.				Overall
Team	W		L	PCT	W		L	PCT
Central Connecticut	13	–	3	.813	20	–	11	.645
Merrimack	13	–	3	.813	21	–	12	.636
Sacred Heart	10	–	6	.625	16	–	16	.500
Le Moyne*	9	–	7	.563	15	–	17	.469
Fairleigh Dickinson	9	–	7	.563	15	–	17	.469
Wagner †	7	–	9	.438	17	–	16	.515
LIU	6	–	10	.375	7	–	22	.241
Saint Francis	3	–	13	.188	8	–	22	.267
Stonehill*	2	–	14	.125	4	–	27	.129
† 2024 NEC tournament winner * ineligible for the 2024 NCAA tournament due to transition from Division II

The 2023–24 Central Connecticut Blue Devils men's basketball team represented Central Connecticut State University during the 2023–24 NCAA Division I men's basketball season. The Blue Devils, led by third-year head coach Patrick Sellers, played their home games at the William H. Detrick Gymnasium in New Britain, Connecticut as members of the Northeast Conference (NEC).

The Blue Devils finished the season 20–11, 13–3 in NEC play, to finish in a tie for first place. In the NEC tournament, they defeated Saint Francis (PA) in the quarterfinals before falling to Wagner in the semifinals.

== Previous season ==
The Blue Devils finished the 2022–23 season 10–22, 7–9 in NEC play, to finish in a tie for seventh place. They were defeated by Saint Francis (PA) in the quarterfinals of the NEC tournament.

== Preseason polls ==
=== Northeast Conference poll ===
The Northeast Conference released its preseason coaches' poll on October 24, 2023. The Blue Devils were picked to finish second in the conference.

Rank	Team
1.	Sacred Heart (7)
2.	Central Connecticut (1)
3.	Fairleigh Dickinson (1)
4.	Merrimack
5.	Wagner
6.	Stonehill
7.	LIU
8.	Saint Francis (PA)
9.	Le Moyne

() first-place votes

=== Preseason All-Conference Team ===
Senior forward Kellen Amos was selected as a member of the NEC Preseason All-Conference Team.

== Roster ==
2023–24 Central Connecticut Blue Devils men's basketball team
Players
Coaches

Pos.	#	Name	Height	Weight	Year	Previous school	Hometown
G	0	Joe Ostrowsky	6 ft 0 in (1.83 m)	175 lb (79 kg)	Jr	Cheshire Academy	Mount Pleasant, MI
G	1	Jay Rodgers	6 ft 3 in (1.91 m)	185 lb (84 kg)	Sr	Cochise College	Pickerington, OH
G	2	TJ Holloway	6 ft 4 in (1.93 m)	200 lb (91 kg)	So	Canterbury School	Orange, CT
G	3	Davonte Sweatman	5 ft 8 in (1.73 m)	145 lb (66 kg)	Jr	Lawrence Academy	Boston, MA
G/F	5	Kellen Amos	6 ft 7 in (2.01 m)	190 lb (86 kg)	Sr	Binghamton	Houston, TX
G	10	Tre Breland	6 ft 4 in (1.93 m)	190 lb (86 kg)	Sr	Missouri State–West Plains	Hamden, CT
F	11	Abdul Momoh	6 ft 7 in (2.01 m)	235 lb (107 kg)	Jr	The Patrick School	Carteret, NJ
F	12	Allan Jeanne-Rose	6 ft 7 in (2.01 m)	200 lb (91 kg)	GS	Fairfield	Saint-Joseph, Martinique
F	13	Darin Jr. Smith	6 ft 7 in (2.01 m)	190 lb (86 kg)	Fr	Vermont Academy	Springfield, MA
F	14	Daniele Russo	6 ft 7 in (2.01 m)	215 lb (98 kg)	So	Otero College	Orlando, FL
F/C	15	Jayden Brown	6 ft 8 in (2.03 m)	215 lb (98 kg)	Jr	Tilton School	Providence, RI
G	20	DJ Victory	5 ft 8 in (1.73 m)	160 lb (73 kg)	Fr	Cardinal Hayes High School	Harlem, NY
F	22	Matias Rissanen	6 ft 7 in (2.01 m)	208 lb (94 kg)	Fr	Tapiolan Honka	Espoo, Finland
G	23	Jordan Jones	6 ft 0 in (1.83 m)	180 lb (82 kg)	Sr	Coker	Florence, SC
G	24	Stefan Gogic	6 ft 4 in (1.93 m)	180 lb (82 kg)	So	IMG Academy	Belgrade, Serbia
F	44	Brody Limric	6 ft 9 in (2.06 m)	200 lb (91 kg)	So	Quinnipiac	Glastonbury, CT

Head coach

- Patrick Sellers (Central Connecticut State)

Assistant coach(es)

- Ben Wood (Connecticut)
- Lenny Jefferson (Central Connecticut State)
- Ryan Olander (Fairfield)

Legend

- (C) Team captain
- (S) Suspended
- (I) Ineligible
- (W) Walk-on
- Injured
- Current redshirt

Roster
Last update: November 27, 2023

== Schedule and results ==
Date time, TV	Rank^{#}	Opponent^{#}	Result	Record	Site (attendance) city, state
Non-conference regular season
November 6, 2023*; 7:00 p.m., ESPN+		at Rhode Island	L 70–81	0–1	Ryan Center (4,118); Kingston, RI
November 10, 2023*; 4:00 p.m., ESPN+		at Quinnipiac	L 70–74	0–2	M&T Bank Arena (1,112); Hamden, CT
November 13, 2023*; 7:00 p.m., NEC Front Row		Framingham State	W 99–42	1–2	William H. Detrick Gymnasium (1,115); New Britain, CT
November 19, 2023*; 1:00 p.m., NEC Front Row		Manhattan	L 63–67	1–3	William H. Detrick Gymnasium (1,041); New Britain, CT
November 22, 2023*; 2:00 p.m., NESN/ESPN+		at UMass	L 60–89	1–4	Mullins Center (2,054); Amherst, MA
November 29, 2023*; 4:00 p.m., ESPN+		at Army	W 79–51	2–4	Christl Arena (350); West Point, NY
December 2, 2023*; 1:00 p.m., NEC Front Row		Holy Cross	W 78–67	3–4	William H. Detrick Gymnasium (1,021); New Britain, CT
December 5, 2023*; 6:00 p.m., ACCN		at Boston College	L 68–82	3–5	Conte Forum (3,118); Chestnut Hill, MA
December 9, 2023*; 2:00 p.m., ESPN+		at Maine	L 56–69	3–6	Memorial Gymnasium (732); Orono, ME
December 16, 2023*; 5:00 p.m., ESPN+		at UMass Lowell	W 57–54	4–6	Tsongas Center (1,379); Lowell, MA
December 19, 2023*; 7:00 p.m., NEC Front Row		Northeastern	L 74–79	4–7	William H. Detrick Gymnasium (1,015); New Britain, CT
December 21, 2023*; 12:00 p.m., SNY/ESPN+		at Fordham	W 82–80	5–7	Rose Hill Gymnasium (2,800); The Bronx, NY
December 30, 2023*; 1:00 p.m., NEC Front Row		Saint Elizabeth	W 99–38	6–7	William H. Detrick Gymnasium (923); New Britain, CT
NEC regular season
January 4, 2024; 7:00 p.m., NEC Front Row		at Stonehill	W 74–59	7–7 (1–0)	Merkert Gymnasium (230); Easton, MA
January 13, 2024; 4:00 p.m., NEC Front Row		at Saint Francis (PA)	W 75–61	8–7 (2–0)	DeGol Arena (510); Loretto, PA
January 15, 2024; 4:00 p.m., NEC Front Row		Merrimack	W 75–70	9–7 (3–0)	William H. Detrick Gymnasium (1,022); New Britain, CT
January 19, 2024; 7:00 p.m., NEC Front Row		Le Moyne	L 73–75	9–8 (3–1)	William H. Detrick Gymnasium (1,182); New Britain, CT
January 21, 2024; 7:00 p.m., SNY/NEC Front Row		at LIU	W 72–63	10–8 (4–1)	Steinberg Wellness Center (458); Brooklyn, NY
January 25, 2024; 5:00 p.m., ESPNU/ESPN+		at Fairleigh Dickinson	W 76–60	11–8 (5–1)	Bogota Savings Bank Center (371); Hackensack, NJ
January 27, 2024; 1:00 p.m., NEC Front Row		Wagner	W 69–68 ^{OT}	12–8 (6–1)	William H. Detrick Gymnasium (1,121); New Britain, CT
February 1, 2024; 7:00 p.m., NEC Front Row		Saint Francis (PA)	W 63–62	13–8 (7–1)	William H. Detrick Gymnasium (1,301); New Britain, CT
February 3, 2024; 3:00 p.m., NEC Front Row		at Merrimack	L 68–71	13–9 (7–2)	Lawler Arena (1,936); North Andover, MA
February 8, 2024; 7:00 p.m., NEC Front Row		Sacred Heart	W 77–70	14–9 (8–2)	William H. Detrick Gymnasium (2,023); New Britain, CT
February 10, 2024; 1:00 p.m., YES/ESPN+		Fairleigh Dickinson	W 71–62	15–9 (9–2)	William H. Detrick Gymnasium (1,090); New Britain, CT
February 15, 2024; 7:00 p.m., NEC Front Row		at Le Moyne	L 64–69 ^{OT}	15–10 (9–3)	Ted Grant Court (569); DeWitt, NY
February 22, 2024; 7:00 p.m., NEC Front Row		at Wagner	W 73–72	16–10 (10–3)	Spiro Sports Center (1,051); Staten Island, NY
February 24, 2024; 2:00 p.m., NEC Front Row		at Sacred Heart	W 68–67	17–10 (11–3)	William H. Pitt Center (1,046); Fairfield, CT
February 29, 2024; 7:00 p.m., NEC Front Row		LIU	W 78–64	18–10 (12–3)	William H. Detrick Gymnasium (1,429); New Britain, CT
March 2, 2024; 1:00 p.m., NEC Front Row		Stonehill	W 79–67	19–10 (13–3)	William H. Detrick Gymnasium (1,631); New Britain, CT
NEC tournament
March 6, 2024; 7:00 p.m., NEC Front Row	(1)	(8) Saint Francis (PA); Quarterfinals	W 71–62	20–10	William H. Detrick Gymnasium (2,412); New Britain, CT
March 9, 2024; 2:00 p.m., YES/ESPN+	(1)	(6) Wagner; Semifinals	L 56–66	20–11	William H. Detrick Gymnasium (2,449); New Britain, CT
*Non-conference game. ^{#}Rankings from AP poll. (#) Tournament seedings in parentheses. All times are in Eastern.
