= Donald Copeland =

American basketball coach

Seton Hall Pirates
- Title: Assistant coach

Personal information
- Born: February 11, 1984 (age 42) Jersey City, New Jersey, U.S.
- Listed height: 5 ft 10 in (1.78 m)

Career information
- High school: St. Anthony (Jersey City, New Jersey)
- College: Seton Hall (2002–2006)
- NBA draft: 2006: undrafted
- Playing career: 2006–2015
- Position: Point guard
- Coaching career: 2015–present

Career history

Playing
- 2006–2007: Boulogne-Levallois
- 2007–2008: SKS Starogard Gdański
- 2008: Coca-Cola Tigers
- 2008–2009: PGE Turów
- 2009–2010: KK Bosna Royal
- 2010: Atléticos de San Germán
- 2010–2011: Eisbären Bremerhaven
- 2011: Atléticos de San Germán
- 2011: Capitanes de Arecibo
- 2011–2012: JL Bourg Basket
- 2012: Capitanes de Arecibo
- 2012: Vaqueros de Bayamón
- 2012–2013: ZTE KK
- 2013: Vaqueros de Bayamón
- 2013: Atléticos de San Germán
- 2013–2014: BC Kyiv
- 2014: Piratas de Quebradillas
- 2015: Leones de Ponce

Coaching
- 2015–2017: Wagner (GA)
- 2017–2021: Wagner (assistant)
- 2021–2022: Seton Hall (assistant)
- 2022–2026: Wagner
- 2026–present: Seton Hall (assistant)

Career highlights
- As player: Second-team All-Big East (2006); As coach: NEC tournament championship (2024)

Donald Copeland (born February 11, 1984) is an American former basketball player and coach who is currently an assistant coach for the Seton Hall Pirates men's basketball team. He was the former head coach of the Wagner Seahawks.

== Playing career ==
Copeland played basketball under Bob Hurley at St. Anthony High School where he helped lead the team to two state titles, while also earning all-state honors in New Jersey. He'd play collegiately at Seton Hall under Louis Orr, and was named a Second Team All-Big East selection in his senior season. He was voted Seton Hall’s Senior Male Athlete of the Year. After graduation, Copeland would play professionally for nine seasons across Europe and in Puerto Rico. He played on two championship teams in Puerto Rico, including as a member of Leones de Ponce in 2015.

== Coaching career ==
In 2015, Copeland joined the coaching staff at Wagner under Bashir Mason as a graduate assistant before being promoted to a full assistant coach in 2017. In 2021, Copeland returned to his alma mater as an assistant coach under Kevin Willard for one season, before returning to Wagner to take the head coaching position when Mason departed for the head coaching position at Saint Peter's.

=== Player abuse allegations and dismissal ===
In September 2025, multiple former Wagner players accused Copeland of abusive behavior in practices; Wagner suspended Copeland while investigating the claims. In April 2026, Wagner fired Copeland and named assistant coach Dwan McMillan, who served as interim head coach during Copeland's suspension, as the new head coach.

== Head coaching record ==
Record table
| Season | Team | Overall | Conference | Standing | Postseason |
|---|---|---|---|---|---|
Wagner Seahawks (Northeast) (2022–2025)
| 2022–23 | Wagner | 15–13 | 8–8 | 5th | |
| 2023–24 | Wagner | 17–16 | 7–9 | 6th | NCAA Division I Round of 64 |
| 2024–25 | Wagner | 14–16 | 6–10 | 7th | |
| Wagner: | | 46–45 (.505) | 21–27 (.438) | | |
| Total: | | 46–45 (.505) | | | |
National champion Postseason invitational champion Conference regular season champion Conference regular season and conference tournament champion Division regular season champion Division regular season and conference tournament champion Conference tournament champion

== Personal life ==
Copeland is a native of Jersey City, New Jersey. In 2006, Copeland graduated from Seton Hall with a degree in communications and media studies, He earned an MBA degree in 2017 from Wagner while serving on the coaching staff.
