= 2024–25 Northeast Conference men's basketball season =

- League: NCAA Division I
- Sport: Basketball
- Defending champions: Wagner (2023–24)
- Duration: November 4, 2024 – March 21, 2024
- Games: 72 regular-season games (16 per team) and 7 tournament games
- Teams: 9
- Total attendance: 80,570 (Note: Excludes November 20, 2024 Columbia at LIU and February 22, 2025 Fairleigh Dickinson at Saint Francis games for which attendance was not reported. These games are ignored in computing averages.)
- Average attendance: 666 per game based on 121 home games of conference members for which attendance was reported
- TV partner(s): ESPN2, YES, SNP, NESN+
- Streaming partner(s): NESN Nation, ESPN+, NEC Front Row

NBA draft
- Top draft pick: No conference players selected

Regular season
- Regular-season champions: Central Connecticut
- Runners-up: LIU
- Top seed: Central Connecticut
- Season MVP: Jordan Jones (Central Connecticut)
- Top scorer: Terrence Brown (Fairleigh Dickinson) 20.6 points per game

NEC tournament final
- Venue: William H. Detrick Gymnasium; New Britain, Connecticut
- Champions: Saint Francis (2nd title)
- Runners-up: Central Connecticut
- Tournament MVP: Juan Cranford Jr. (Saint Francis)
Note

Northeast Conference men's basketball seasons
- ← 2023–24 2025–26 →

2024–25 Northeast Conference men's basketball standings
	Conf.				Overall
Team	W		L	PCT	W		L	PCT
Central Connecticut	14	–	2	.875	25	–	7	.781
LIU	12	–	4	.750	17	–	16	.515
Mercyhurst **	9	–	7	.563	15	–	16	.484
Saint Francis †	8	–	8	.500	16	–	18	.471
Fairleigh Dickinson	8	–	8	.500	13	–	20	.394
Stonehill *	7	–	9	.438	15	–	17	.469
Wagner	6	–	10	.375	14	–	16	.467
Chicago State	4	–	12	.250	4	–	28	.125
Le Moyne *	4	–	12	.250	9	–	23	.281
† 2025 NEC tournament winner * ineligible for the 2025 NCAA tournament due to transition from Division II ** ineligible for both the 2025 NEC tournament and the 2025 NCAA tournament due to transition from Division II

The 2024–25 Northeast Conference men's basketball season began with practices in October 2024, followed by the start of the 2024–25 NCAA Division I men's basketball season on November 4. Conference play started on January 3, and the regular season ended on March 1, 2025. This was the 44th season of Northeast Conference men's basketball. Central Connecticut and Merrimack were the 2023–24 regular-season co-champions, but only Central Connecticut defended their title, since Merrimack left the NEC and joined the Metro Atlantic Athletic Conference (MAAC). Wagner was the defending conference tournament champion.

This was the first season of NEC membership for both Chicago State, which joined after two seasons as a Division I independent, and Mercyhurst, which began its transition from Division II.

Central Connecticut went 14–2 in conference play to win their second straight NEC regular-season championship, having shared the title in the 2023–24 season.

The NEC tournament was held in March with the higher seeded team hosting each game. All eight teams eligible under conference rules qualified for the tournament; Mercyhurst is ineligible until 2027. Saint Francis, picked in the preseason coaches poll to finish tied for last place, defeated Central Connecticut in the NEC tournament final and advanced to the 2025 NCAA Division I tournament. The tournament championship was the first for Saint Francis since 1991.

Saint Francis lost, 70–68, to Alabama State in a First Four game.

== Offseason ==
Following the resignation of Gerald Gillion to become the associate head coach at LIU, Chicago State promoted assistant coach Scott Spinelli to head coach. Spinelli had been an assistant for the Cougars during the 2023–24 season.

Merrimack and Sacred Heart left the conference after the 2023–24 school year to join the MAAC.

For the third straight year, the NEC changed its rules regarding eligibility for the conference tournament. Teams transitioning from Division II may participate in the NEC tournament starting with the third year of their transition. Therefore, Mercyhurst will not be eligible for the NEC tournament until 2027. The change was prospective rather than retroactive. Consequently, Le Moyne, in their second transition year, remained eligible for the 2025 tournament.

== Head coaches ==
Team	Head coach	Previous position	Year at school	Overall record	NEC record	NEC tournament championships	NCAA tournament record
Central Connecticut	Patrick Sellers	Fairfield (asst.)	4	38–57	25–25	0	—
Chicago State	Scott Spinelli	Chicago State (asst.)	1	0–0	0–0	0	—
Fairleigh Dickinson	Jack Castleberry	Fairleigh Dickinson (asst.)	2	15–17	9–7	0	—
Le Moyne	Nate Champion	Florida Southern (asst.)	5 (Note: Le Moyne did not play during the 2020–21 season due to the COVID-19 pandemic. Consequently, this is Champion's sixth year as the team's head coach but only his fifth season.)	61–56	9–7	0	—
LIU	Rod Strickland	NBA G League Ignite (program director)	3	10–48	7–25	0	—
Mercyhurst	Gary Manchel	Ohio (asst.)	22	373–219	0–0	0	—
Saint Francis	Rob Krimmel	Saint Francis (asst.)	13	155–210	100–110	0	—
Stonehill	Chris Kraus	Stonehill (asst.)	11 (Note: Stonehill did not play during the 2020–21 season due to the COVID-19 pandemic. Consequently, this is Kraus's 12th year as the team's head coach but only his 11th season.)	148–143	12–20	0	—
Wagner	Donald Copeland	Seton Hall (asst.)	3	32–29	15–17	1	1–1

Notes
All records, appearances, titles, etc. are from time with current school only.
Year at school includes 2024–25 season.
Overall and NEC/NCAA records are from time at current school and are before the beginning of the 2024–25 season.
Previous jobs are head coaching jobs unless otherwise noted.

== Preseason ==
=== Preseason coaches' poll and rankings ===
The table below shows the preseason rankings of NEC teams based on a poll of the conference's coaches as well as each team's preseason Pomeroy rating among the 364 Division I teams.

Rank	Team	Pomeroy rating
1 (tie)	Central Connecticut (5)	303
1 (tie)	Wagner (4)	272
3	Fairleigh Dickinson	352
4	Le Moyne	335
5	LIU	354
6	Chicago State	340
7	Mercyhurst	356
8 (tie)	Saint Francis	351
8 (tie)	Stonehill	358

() first-place votes

=== Preseason All-NEC team ===
Player	School
Malachi Davis ( (redshirt) Junior, Guard)	LIU
Jo'el Emanuel (Junior, Forward)	Fairleigh Dickinson
Darrick Jones Jr. (5th-yr. Senior, Guard)	Le Moyne
Jordan Jones (Senior, Guard)	Central Connecticut
Jeff Planutis (Graduate, Forward)	Mercyhurst

== Regular season ==
=== Early-season multi-team events ===
Team	Event	Sponsor	Record
Central Connecticut	None	–	–
Chicago State	Sunshine Slam	Northeast Conference	0–3
Fairleigh Dickinson	Metro NY/NJ Classic	Fairleigh Dickinson	1–1
Le Moyne	Island U Invitational	Texas A&M–Corpus Christi	1–1
LIU	Lafayette Classic	Lafayette	0–3
Mercyhurst	Cal Classic	California	1–2
Saint Francis	Hoya MTE	Georgetown	0–2
Stonehill	Urban-Bennett Invitational	Robert Morris	1–2
Wagner	None	–	–

=== Pre-conference season highlights ===
Le Moyne traveled just over three miles for their season opener at Syracuse on November 4, 2024. The Dolphins shocked the Orange by holding them to 32% shooting from the floor in the first half and led by five points at intermission. With Le Moyne leading by a point, a 9–0 Syracuse run gave the Orange a 76–68 lead with 4:31 to play. However, the Dolphins responded with a 6–2 spurt, getting three points each from Will Amica on a triple and Freds Pauls Bagatskis on three free throws. Trent Mosquera's three-pointer cut the Syracuse lead to two points with 1:02 left, and another triple from Bagatskis made it 83–82 with 22 seconds on the clock. After the Orange hit one of two from the line, the Dolphins turned the ball over with six seconds to play, and Syracuse hit two more free throws, handing the Dolphins a heartbreaking 86–82 loss. Bagatskis scored 18 points to lead five Dolphins in double figures.

After starting the game 0 for 4 from the floor, Mercyhurst found their shooting touch and earned their first win as a Division I program in just their second game, 78–73, at Morgan State on November 6. Freshman Mykolaus Ivanauskas scored 16 points and grabbed seven rebounds off the bench to lead the Lakers. Mercyhurst trailed, 71–69, with just over a minute remaining, when senior Aidan Reichert scored to tie the game. Graduate student Jeff Planutis scored the final seven points for the Lakers, first hitting a three-pointer with 29 seconds left that gave them the lead and then sinking four free throws in the closing seconds. Prior to this season, the only win over a Division I opponent for Mercyhurst came on December 28, 1974, on a neutral floor against Delaware State.

After opening the season with a tight 59–55 loss at Providence, Central Connecticut got 13 points each from Jordan Jones, Darin Smith Jr. and Jayden Brown and secured a 73–67 win at Saint Joseph's on November 8. The Blue Devils used a 9–0 second-half run to erase a four-point deficit. Clinging to a three-point lead, Smith hit a contested triple as the shot clock expired with 2:29 to play. On Central Connecticut's next possession, Davonte Sweatman, who finished with 11 points, hit a 27-footer off a pass from Jones, who had lost control of the ball in the lane but recovered possession. Abdul Momoh was 4 for 5 from the floor and finished with nine points, 11 rebounds and two blocks. The Blue Devils' win was their first over a team ranked in the KenPom top 100 in nearly 12 years.

Valentino Pinedo led a Saint Francis comeback from a 15-point deficit at Campbell on November 10. Pinedo tied the game with a layup with 1:39 to play and tied it again with a tip-in with 49 seconds left. After the Red Flash got a stop on the defensive end, Pinedo was fouled with one second left. He missed the first free throw but hit the second, after the Fighting Camels used a timeout to ice him, and gave Saint Francis a 65–64 victory. Sophomore Ace Talbert scored 18 points to lead the Red Flash and shot 4 for 6 from beyond the arc.

LIU got 17 points and five assists from Malachi Davis in a 63–54 victory at Air Force on November 11. The Sharks held the Falcons to 36% shooting from the field. Freshman guard Jalen “Roc” Lee scored 12 points off the bench, shooting 5 for 10 from the floor, for LIU.

Mercyhurst earned their first home victory against a Division I opponent, defeating Canisius, 62–52, on November 13. The Lakers were down one point midway through the second half and went on a 12–0 run, keyed by six points from Aidan Reichert, to snatch control of the contest. Bernie Blunt III scored 16 points to lead Mercyhurst.

Stonehill earned a 26-point win, their largest margin of victory as a Division I team against a Division I opponent, when they defeated New Orleans, 80–54, in an Urban-Bennett Invitational game on November 15. Josh Morgan had his first career double-double with 20 points and 10 rebounds for the Skyhawks. Stonehill held the Privateers to 26% shooting from the floor.

LIU built a 24-point lead with under 11 minutes to play at Charlotte on November 23. The 49ers then held the Sharks scoreless for 7:44 and went on an 18–0 run to get within 67–61 with 3:23 remaining. In the final two minutes, senior guard Terell Strickland scored on a layup and then found Jamal Fuller for a dunk with 34 seconds left to push the Sharks' lead to 75–70. Malachi Davis had a career high 31 points for LIU and was 4 for 4 from the free-throw line in the final 16 seconds. Charlotte missed a three-pointer at the buzzer, and LIU held on for a 79–76 victory, the first in program history over an American Athletic Conference opponent. Freshman Shadrak Lasu had his first career double-double with 11 points and 10 rebounds for the Sharks. Strickland finished with 13 points and seven assists.

Stonehill faced an eight-point second-half deficit in their November 25 home game against East Texas A&M. The Skyhawks got within two points and had possession with 13 seconds to play. Todd Brogna drove to the basket, was fouled and hit a pair of free throws with 2.2 seconds left. Chas Stinson forced a quick turnover, as the Lions tried to inbound the ball, and then was fouled driving to the basket. With 0.8 seconds on the clock, Stinson drained both free throws to give the Skyhawks a 67–65 win. Josh Morgan scored a game-high 20 points on 6-for-13 shooting from the floor, including 4-for-8 from beyond the arc, to lead the Skyhawks. Morgan surpassed 1,000 career points in the game. Brogna added 16 points for Stonehill.

Saint Francis saw their 21-point lead disappear in their November 26 home game against Lehigh, when the Mountain Hawks tied the score at 78 with 1:45 to play. However, Bobby Rosenberger III hit a three-pointer that sparked a game-ending 10–0 run to give the Red Flash an 88–78 victory. Riley Parker scored 23 points and dished out seven assists to lead Saint Francis. Rosenberger finished with 21 points and eight rebounds.

Le Moyne shot 60.4% from the floor, a new program record for the Division I era, and held off a late charge in an 81–77 win at Manhattan on November 29. After the Jaspers cut the Dolphins' 16-point lead down to two, AJ Dancler hit a triple with 1:12 to play to stall the rally. A pair of free throws by Robby Carmody with nine seconds left sealed the Le Moyne victory. Dwayne Koroma scored 17 points on 8-for-9 shooting from the floor and added five rebounds and five assists. Ocypher Owens led the Dolphins with 18 points and nine rebounds and added six assists. Zek Tekin finished with 16 points and eight assists for Le Moyne.

Abdul Momoh led a strong finish by Central Connecticut in their 69–67 home victory over UMass Lowell on December 1. Momoh scored on drives to the basket on three straight possessions, while the Blue Devils got stops at the defensive end, to flip a one-point deficit with less than three minutes to play to a five-point lead. Sophomore Matt Frazier entered the game with one second remaining to guard the River Hawks' inbounds pass, and he deflected it and stole the ball to secure the win. Darin Smith Jr. scored 14 points to lead Central Connecticut and added three steals. Momoh finished with 13 points and five rebounds. Devin Haid scored 12 points and grabbed eight rebounds for the Blue Devils.

Stonehill earned an impressive home win over Quinnipiac, the pre-season favorite in the Metro Atlantic Athletic Conference, on December 1. The Skyhawks shot 53.2% from the field and 54.2% from three-point range in their 88–74 victory. Josh Morgan scored 22 points to lead Stonehill. Louie Semona came off the bench to add 18 points for the Skyhawks.

Le Moyne hosted Army in a thriller on December 3. The Black Knights had a 14-point lead with less than five minutes to play, but the Dolphins stormed back and tied the game on Dwayne Koroma's layup with four seconds left. Army held another late lead in overtime, but AJ Dancler tied the score at 82 for Le Moyne. Zek Tekin then stole the ball, but his three-pointer at the buzzer was off the mark. Tekin's pair of free throws in the closing seconds of double overtime tied the game again. Ryan Curry's three-pointer with six seconds remaining in triple overtime broke a tie and gave Army a 103–100 lead. Dancler shot a three-pointer at the buzzer, but it was off the mark, and Army held on for the win. According to the KenPom win probability metric, the game was the third most exciting game up that that point in the Division I season. Koroma and Ocypher Owens each had their first career double-double for Le Moyne. Koroma finished with 19 points, 15 rebounds and two steals. Owens had 14 points and 11 rebounds. Tekin matched Koroma for team-high scoring honors with 19 points and added seven rebounds, five assists and three steals. Jalen Rucker scored 34 and added 13 rebounds, five assists and six steals for Army.

Central Connecticut led by as many as 11 points in their December 4 game at UMass but found themselves trailing by two with less than four minutes to play. Davonte Sweatman's free throws tied the game, and Devin Haid came up with a steal and a layup and then converted the three-point play to give the Blue Devils a three-point lead. The Minutemen answered, but Abdul Momoh's clutch scoring down the stretch kept Central Connecticut in front. His layup off a pass from Jordan Jones gave the Blue Devils a four-point lead with 28 seconds to play, and Central Connecticut held on for a 73–69 victory, their second of the season over an Atlantic 10 opponent. Momoh scored nine points in the game, all of which came in the final 5:50. Haid scored 18 points to lead the Blue Devils and added seven rebounds.

Wagner earned their fourth victory in five games, when they won at Maryland Eastern Shore, 63–61, on December 8. The Seahawks had a 15-point second-half lead only to see the Hawks tie the score with 1:10 to play. Ja'Kair Sanchez and R.J. Greene each hit a pair of free throws to secure the win. Greene scored 18 points to lead Wagner and grabbed five rebounds. Keyontae Lewis finished with 11 points and seven rebounds for the Seahawks.

Stonehill trailed by 13 points with 10 minutes to play in their December 15 game at Boston College. After a 15–6 run featuring four three-pointers, the Skyhawks trailed by only two points with 21 seconds to play. However, the Eagles went 4 for 4 from the free-throw line in the closing seconds to secure a 73–69 win. Todd Brogna, who hit one of the triples during the late charge, scored a career-high 25 points, shooting 10 for 16 from the floor. Ethan Meuser hit the first two three-pointers, sparking the run, and finished with 11 points for Stonehill.

Jayden Brown recorded his first career double-double with 16 points, 12 rebounds and three blocks to lead Central Connecticut to a 64–63 win at Fairfield on December 18. Two straight layups by Jordan Jones gave the Blue Devils a 60–58 lead, and Brown hit another layup off a pass from Jones to extend Central Connecticut's advantage to four points. After a Stags basket, Devin Haid's driving layup restored the Blue Devils' four-point edge with 46 seconds to play. Central Connecticut had a one-point lead and three fouls to give on Fairfield's final possession with 14 seconds to go. The Blue Devils used all three fouls to burn eight seconds off the clock. The Stags tried a three-pointer at the buzzer that missed, giving Central Connecticut the victory. The game featured only one made free throw. Central Connecticut was 1 for 1 from the line, while Fairfield went 0 for 2. Jones finished with 12 points and seven assists for the Blue Devils, and Haid added 13 points.

=== Conference season highlights ===
Central Connecticut opened their conference schedule with a 74–59 win at Saint Francis on January 3, 2025. The Blue Devils held the Red Flash to 30% shooting from the floor in the second half to break open a game that was tied at intermission. Jordan Jones scored 26 points on 11-for-15 shooting from the floor and a 4-for-7 clip from beyond the arc to lead Central Connecticut. Devin Haid added 18 points and eight rebounds for the Blue Devils. Valentino Pinedo and Riley Parker each scored 12 points for Saint Francis. Pinedo also pulled down eight rebounds.

LIU hosted Le Moyne at Barclays Center in the NEC opener for both teams on January 3. The Sharks shot 56% from the floor and 54% from distance and defeated the Dolphins, 78–62. Malachi Davis scored 24 points on 10-for-16 shooting to lead LIU and added four rebounds, five assists and three steals. Jamal Fuller scored 20 points on 8-for-12 shooting from the field for the Sharks. Ocypher Owens had a double-double for Le Moyne with 19 points, 12 rebounds and five blocks. Robby Carmody added 16 points and two steals for the Dolphins.

After losing their NEC opener at home to Chicago State, Wagner was looking to even their league record, when they welcomed Fairleigh Dickinson on January 5, in the start of conference play for the Knights. The Seahawks raced to an early 17–4 lead. However, Fairleigh Dickinson went on a 20–4 run and claimed a three-point advantage at halftime. The Knights seized control of the game in the second half and secured a 71–59 victory. Terrence Brown and Bismark Nsiah each had a double-double for Fairleigh Dickinson. Brown matched his career high with 28 points and posted a new career best with 10 boards. Nsiah finished with 11 points, 12 rebounds and nine assists. Zae Blake scored 20 points to lead Wagner and added two steals.

Abdul Momoh had a double-double with 17 points and 10 rebounds to lead Central Connecticut to a 62–50 win at Mercyhurst on January 5. Jordan Jones added 12 points for the Blue Devils, who overcame a one-point halftime deficit to improve to 2–0 in the NEC. Aidan Reichert scored 15 points to lead the Lakers, and Jeff Planutis added 10 points and eight rebounds.

Jamal Fuller scored 16 points and grabbed seven rebounds to lead LIU to a 53–39 home win over Chicago State on January 5. Malachi Davis added 12 points for the Sharks, who improved to 2–0 in NEC play and also got 10 points and seven rebounds from Brent Davis. Gabe Spinelli scored nine points to lead the Cougars. Jalen Forrest added eight points, nine rebounds and two blocked shots for Chicago State.

LIU had a two-point lead in their January 10 game at Stonehill but closed the affair on a 15–7 run to earn an 80–70 victory. Malachi Davis scored the first 13 Shark points during the run and finished with 27 points on 12-for-18 shooting from the floor. Jamal Fuller added 14 points and seven rebounds for LIU. Louie Semona scored 17 points to lead the Skyhawks, and Chas Stinson added 14 points, four assists and two steals.

In a battle featuring the NEC's preseason co-favorites, Wagner visited Central Connecticut on January 10. Ja'Kair Sanchez hit a running bank shot with under 30 seconds remaining that gave the Seahawks a four-point lead, and they held on for a 62–57 victory, handing the Blue Devils their first home loss of the season. Sanchez finished with 19 points and seven rebounds. Zaire Williams added 18 points for Wagner. Davonte Sweatman scored 14 points to lead Central Connecticut, and Jayden Brown added 12 points and six rebounds.

Saint Francis used 65% second-half shooting to build a nine-point lead in their January 12 game at Fairleigh Dickinson but had to hit four free throws in the closing seconds to secure a 75–71 win, after the Knights had closed to within two points. Riley Parker scored 18 points on 7-for-10 shooting, including 3 for 3 from distance, to lead the Red Flash. Juan Cranford Jr. added 14 points and five rebounds for Saint Francis. Jo'el Emanuel finished with 24 points, 10 rebounds and two steals for Fsirleigh Dickinson.

LIU emerged from the second week of league play as the NEC's only undefeated team in conference games at 4–0. The Sharks went on a 9–2 run to close the first half and take a 24–16 lead at intermission of their January 12 game at Central Connecticut. LIU held a nine-point advantage, when the Blue Devils went on a 13–2 run to forge ahead, 49–47, with 4:27 to play. The Sharks went on a 7–0 run to reclaim the lead. After Central Connecticut cut the lead to two points, the Blue Devils had possession in the closing seconds, but Brent Davis stole the ball to secure a 54–52 win for LIU. Terell Strickland had 12 points, seven rebounds and five assists for the Sharks, and Malachi Davis added 12 points and three steals. Devin Haid finished with 20 points and seven rebounds for Central Connecticut.

Malachi Davis scored 10 points in the final four minutes of the game to lead LIU to a 64–51 home win over Saint Francis on January 18. Davis finished with 23 points, and Jamal Fuller added 10 points and eight rebounds for the Sharks, who remained undefeated in NEC play. Juan Cranford Jr. scored 10 points to lead the Red Flash.

Chicago State had their highest scoring output of the season in their 88–72 win over Le Moyne on January 18, the first home win of the campaign for the Cougars. Chicago State shot 54.7% from floor and 57.9% from beyond the arc. Jalen Forrest scored 24 points and grabbed eight rebounds to lead the Cougars. Gabe Spinelli added 14 points, seven assists and five steals for Chicago State. AJ Dancier had 19 points, six rebounds and five assists for the Dolphins, and Dwayne Koroma added 12 points, 10 rebounds and three steals.

LIU earned their sixth straight NEC victory to start league play, 72–63 overtime home win over Mercyhurst on January 20. Malachi Davis had 23 points, nine assists and three steals for the Sharks, and Jamal Fuller added 20 points, 12 rebounds and four blocks. Jeff Planutis scored 18 points to lead the Lakers, and Aidan Reichert added 15 points and four steals.

Zaire Williams hit a pull-up bank shot from the lane with 1.9 seconds left in double overtime to give Wagner a 70–68 home win over Saint Francis on January 20. Williams finished with 15 points and seven rebounds. Ja'Kair Sanchez scored 24 points and grabbed five rebounds for the Seahawks. Riley Parker had 19 points and two steals to lead the Red Flash, and Valentino Pinedo had a double-double with 12 points and 11 rebounds.

Stonehill erased a 64–45 deficit with a 20–0 run over five minutes and took a one-point lead with 1:55 to play in their January 20 game at Le Moyne. After the shellshocked Dolphins reclaimed the lead, Hermann Koffi hit a triple with nine seconds left to put the Skyhawks in front, 72–71. Robby Carmody was then fouled with four seconds to play and drained both free throws to give Le Moyne a 73-72 victory. Carmody had 20 points and seven rebounds for the Dolphins. AJ Dancler finished with 19 points, seven rebounds and nine assists for Le Moyne, and Dwayne Koroma added nine points and 11 rebounds. Koffi scored 18 points to lead the Stonehill. Louie Semona had 14 points and six rebounds, and Todd Brogna had 12 points and six rebounds for the Skyhawks.

Riley Parker, playing with his father in the stands, scored 29 points on 9-for-14 shooting from the floor, including 4 for 8 from three-point range, and hit all seven of his free throws to lead Saint Francis to a 74–64 home victory over LIU on January 24. Riley's father was watching his son play for the first time in the United States and traveled 26 hours from Australia to attend the game. Valentino Pinedo added 12 points and nine rebounds for the Red Flash. Jamal Fuller had 25 points and nine rebounds for the Sharks, who suffered their first NEC loss of the season after six straight wins. Brent Davis added nine points and four steals for LIU.

Jake Lemelman's back-to-back triples broke a tie and gave Mercyhurst a 64–58 lead with less than a minute to play in their January 24 home game against Wagner. The Lakers held on for a 71–66 victory. Aidan Reichert scored 23 points on 9-for-12 shooting from the floor, including 3 for 3 from distance to lead Mercyhurst. Lemelman finished with eight points and three assists. Zae Blake scored 18 points and had two steals for the Seahawks.

Gabe Spinelli drove the length of the floor for Chicago State's game-tying layup with 5.1 seconds to play at Stonehill on January 24. After a timeout, the Skyhawks pushed the ball to the frontcourt and called another timeout with 3.1 seconds left. Stonehill inbounded the ball to Josh Morgan, who spun around his defender, drove the baseline and hit a contested layup with 0.2 seconds remaining, giving the Skyhawks a 75–73 victory. Louie Semona scored 21 points to lead Stonehill. Morgan finished with 11 points. Spinelli scored 25 points to lead the Cougars, and Jalen Forrest added 23.

Jeff Planutis hit two mid-range jump shots late in double overtime that carried Mercyhurst to an 85–80 home win over LIU on January 26. Bernie Blunt scored 27 points to lead the Lakers, and Planutis added 23. Blunt and Planutis each had three steals. Brent Davis scored 20 points to lead the Sharks. Jamal Fuller had 14 points, eight rebounds, five assists, two steals and three blocks for LIU.

LIU hosted Central Connecticut in a battle for first place on January 30. The Sharks claimed an early 7–2 lead, but the Blue Devils tightened their defense, holding LIU to 29% shooting from the floor in the first half, and earned a nine-point lead at the break. Central Connecticut went on an 8–0 run in the second half that gave them a 24-point lead with 8:15 remaining and went on to a 63–50 victory. Jordan Jones scored 17 points to lead the Blue Devils and added five rebounds, two assists and three steals. Max Frazier had five blocked shots for Central Connecticut. Terell Strickland had 19 points and three steals for LIU.

Aidan Reichert's driving layup with 31 seconds to play gave Mercyhurst a 58–56 lead in their January 30 home game against Saint Francis. Bernie Blunt III hit four free throws in the final eight seconds to put away a 62–58 victory for the Lakers. Blunt scored 22 points to lead Mercyhurst. Jeff Planutis had 18 points on 6-for-11 shooting from the floor, and Reichert added 16 points for the Lakers. Daemar Kelly scored 14 points to lead the Red Flash, and Riley Parker added 12 points and seven rebounds.

Overtime heroics by Jalen Forrest led Chicago State to a 73–67 home victory over LIU on February 1. The Cougars overcame a nine-point deficit in the final five minutes of regulation to force the extra session, knotting the score at 58 on a three-pointer by Noble Crawford with 42 seconds left. Forrest scored only five points in the game's first 40 minutes, but he had 14 of the Cougars' 15 points in overtime. His deep triple with 30 seconds to play gave Chicago State a 68–64 lead. Forrest then came up with a steal and took it down the floor for a basket to extend the Cougars' lead to six points with 21 seconds to go. Forrest had 19 points and six rebounds. Gabe Spinelli added 16 points, seven rebounds and three steals for Chicago State. Crawford finished with nine points. Malachi Davis scored 32 points to lead the Sharks. Brent Davis had eight points and seven rebounds for LIU, and Terell Strickland added eight points, six rebounds and four assists.

Bernie Blunt III and Jeff Planutis each drained a pair of free throws in the final eight seconds to secure a 67–60 victory for Mercyhurst at Fairleigh Dickinson on February 1. The win was the fourth straight for the Lakers. Planutis scored 17 points to lead Mercyhurst. Terrence Brown had 19 points to lead the Knights and added three steals. Jo'el Emanuel recorded 10 points, eight rebounds and two steals for Fairleigh Dickinson.

Jalen Forrest scored a career-high 37 points in Chicago State's 85–78 come-from-behind home victory over Mercyhurst on February 6. Forrest was 8-for-18 from the floor, 4-for-8 from beyond the arc and 17-for-20 from the free-throw line. Noble Crawford added 14 points and four steals for the Cougars. Aidan Reichert had 20 points and seven rebounds for the Lakers, who had their four-game winning streak snapped. Jeff Planutis added 15 points and two steals, and Mykolas Ivanauskas had 13 points and 12 rebounds for Mercyhurst.

Saint Francis head coach Rob Krimmel became the first coach in program history to win 100 games in DeGol Arena, when the Red Flash defeated Le Moyne, 86–78, on February 6. Krimmel trails only Saint Francis men's volleyball coach Mike Rumbaugh for most wins in the venue in any sport. Riley Parker scored 18 points to lead the Red Flash. Daemar Kelly added 14 points, and Juan Cranford Jr. had 13 points for Saint Francis. AJ Dancler led the Dolphins with 22 points and seven assists. Robby Carmody added 19 points and two steals, and Dwayne Koroma had 15 points, nine rebounds and three steals for Le Moyne.

Bismark Nsiah scored 18 points and grabbed 10 rebounds to lead Fairleigh Dickinson to a 69–58 home win over Wagner on February 8. Nsiah scored 16 of his points in the second half, and his four free throws in the final minute put the game away for the Knights. Terrence Brown had 12 points, and Dylan Jones added 11 points for Fairleigh Dickinson. Zaire Williams had 15 points, six rebounds and three steals for Wagner.

Jamal Fuller scored five straight points to extend LIU's lead to seven points with 1:33 to play, and the Sharks went on to a 62–59 home victory over Stonehill on February 8. Malachi Davis scored 24 points to lead LIU and added three steals. Fuller finished with 12 points and three steals. Louie Semona had 23 points and seven rebounds for the Skyhawks, and Chas Stinson added 10 points and five assists.

Saint Francis secured the program's first ever win in the state of Illinois with an 81–69 victory at Chicago State on February 8. Jeremy Clayville scored 17 points to lead the Red Flash. Valentino Pinedo added 14 points and seven rebounds for Saint Francis. Gabe Spinelli scored 23 points and had four assists for the Cougars. Jalen Forrest added 17 points and two steals, and Quincy Allen had 14 points, eight rebounds, two steals and two blocked shots for Chicago State.

Todd Brogna scored a team-high 18 points and grabbed eight rebounds to lead Stonehill to a 79–74 home win over Saint Francis on February 13. The Skyhawks shot 12 for 29 from three-point range. Ethan Meuser had 17 points on 5-for-7 shooting from the floor and a 4-for-5 clip from beyond the arc, and Hermann Koffi finished with 17 points on 5-for-10 shooting from distance for Stonehill. Valentino Pinedo had 24 points, seven rebounds and two blocks, and Daemar Kelly scored 12 points and blocked two shots for the Red Flash. Riley Parker had 10 points and six assists for Saint Francis.

Dylan Jones exploded for 25 points in Fairleigh Dickinson's 91–49 home romp over Chicago State on February 13. Jones shot 8 for 12 from three-point range. Terrence Brown scored 17 points, grabbed nine rebounds and had three steals for the Knights. Quincy Allen had 15 points, nine rebounds and two blocked shots for the Cougars.

Wagner trailed by six points with under a minute to play in their February 13 game at Le Moyne, but the Seahawks found themselves inbounding the ball from midcourt with one second to play and the deficit trimmed to three points. Zaire Williams found space in the corner and drained a three-pointer at the buzzer to send the game to overtime. AJ Dancler scored eight of the Dolphins' ten overtime points, including a three-point play with 1:48 to go that gave Le Moyne a six-point lead. Dancler finished with 17 points, all of them scored after halftime, four rebounds, three assists and two steals, and the Dolphins snapped their five-game losing streak with a 72–68 victory. Deng Garang added 15 points, one rebound, two assists and two steals for Le Moyne. R.J. Greene led Wagner with 15 points and seven rebounds. Williams finished with 10 points, eight rebounds and two assists.

Louie Semona scored 30 points and grabbed five rebounds to lead Stonehill to an 85–73 home win over Mercyhurst on February 15. The Skyhawks had season bests of 55.6% shooting from the floor and 1.36 points per possession. Todd Brogna added 16 points and 10 rebounds for Stonehill. Shemar Rathan-Mayes had 19 points and four assists, and Aidan Reichert scored 16 points and grabbed six rebounds for the Lakers.

AJ Dancler's step-back triple was the dagger that secured Le Moyne's 80–75 home win over Chicago State on February 15. Dancler finished with 19 points, seven rebounds, five assists and a steal. Deng Garang added 15 points two rebounds, three assists and two steals, and Dwayne Koroma shot 7 for 9 from the field, finishing with 14 points, 13 rebounds, two assists and a steal for the Dolphins. Koroma's five double-doubles on the season were the most among NEC players. Jalen Forrest scored 22 points to lead the Cougars. Quincy Allen had 18 points, eight rebounds, three assists, two steals and three blocked shots for Chicago State.

Central Connecticut clinched home-court advantage in the NEC tournament quarterfinals with their eighth straight win, an 83–67 home triumph over Saint Francis on February 15. Jordan Jones scored 24 points and had seven assists to lead the Blue Devils, who improved to 19–6 overall and 10–2 in NEC play. Devin Haid added 21 points and seven rebounds for Central Connecticut. Valentino Pinedo had 15 points, and Daemar Kelly added 11 points and four assists for the Red Flash.

LIU joined Central Connecticut in guaranteeing themselves a home game in the NEC quarterfinals with a 62–58 home win over Fairleigh Dickinson on February 15. Malachi Davis scored 21 points and had three steals for the Sharks, who improved to 13–15 overall and 9–4 in NEC play. Jamal Fuller scored 19 points and grabbed five rebounds for LIU. Terrence Brown scored 22 points and had four steals, and Bismark Nsiah had eight points, six rebounds, four assists and two steals for the Knights.

Le Moyne went on a 12–2 run late in their home game against Saint Francis on February 20, to take a three-point lead with 2:54 to play. However, the Dolphins were unable to score during the remainder of regulation, and the Red Flash knotted the game at 66 on a pair of Daemar Kelly free throws with 15 seconds left. AJ Dancler's shot at the buzzer missed, and the game went to overtime. After Le Moyne claimed an early five-point lead in the extra session, Saint Francis went on a 7–0 run to push back in front. Dancler's layup tied the score with 1:14 left. Kelly stole the ball and then drained a pair of free throws to give the Red Flash the lead with 38 seconds on the clock. Juan Cranford Jr. came up with another steal and hit two more free throws, swelling the lead to four points with 18 seconds to play, and Saint Francis held on for an 81–76 victory. Chris Moncrief scored 25 points and grabbed six rebounds to lead the Red Flash. Riley Parker had 19 points, five rebounds and four steals for Saint Francis. Kelly finished with 14 points and Cranford had 12. Dancler led the Dolphins with 30 points and had four assists. Freshman Deng Garang scored 20 points for Le Moyne.

Central Connecticut clinched home-court advantage through the NEC tournament semifinals with an 81–75 victory at Chicago State on February 20. Abdul Momoh scored 19 points on 8-for-12 shooting from the floor to lead the Blue Devils. Jordan Jones added 18 points, and Devin Haid scored 16 points for Central Connecticut, who won their ninth straight game. Dailliss Cox finished with 20 points and 10 rebounds, and Noble Crawford had 16 points, seven rebounds, four assists and two steals for the Cougars. Jalen Forrest scored 15 points and grabbed seven rebounds for Chicago State.

After a timeout, Dylan Jones banked a three-pointer with 2.4 seconds to play in regulation, tying the game for Fairleigh Dickinson at Saint Francis on February 22. Riley Parker scored the first seven points of overtime to give the Red Flash a lead, and his two free throws with 14 seconds to go iced an 85–80 victory for Saint Francis. Parker finished with 28 points, 22 of them after halftime, shooting 10 for 15 from the floor and 4 for 7 from beyond the arc. Chris Moncrief added 14 points and nine rebounds for the Red Flash. Terrence Brown scored 27 points and added two steals for the Knights, and Jo'el Emanuel added 15 points and seven rebounds. Brayden Reynolds scored 12 points and had six rebounds, four assists and two steals for Fairleigh Dickinson.

Central Connecticut clinched the no. 1 seed in the NEC tournament and at least a share of the league's regular-season title with a 67–41 home win over Stonehill on February 22. Jordan Jones scored 23 points to lead the Blue Devils, who improved to 21–6 overall and 12–2 in NEC play with their 10th straight victory. Devin Haid added 10 points, seven rebounds and four steals for Central Connecticut. Todd Brogna scored 11 points for the Skyhawks.

LIU clinched the no. 2 seed in the NEC tournament with a 76–61 victory at Le Moyne on February 22. Brent Davis scored 17 points and added five steals for the Sharks, who improved to 14–15 overall and 10–4 in NEC play. Terell Strickland added 15 points, six rebounds and six assists for LIU. AJ Dancler had 17 points, four assists and two steals, Ocypher Owens scored nine points, and Dwayne Koroma had eight points and six rebounds for the Dolphins.

Central Connecticut clinched the outright NEC regular-season championship with an 84–75 home win over Le Moyne on February 27. Devin Haid scored 18 points, grabbed nine rebounds and dished out six assists to lead the Blue Devils to their 11th straight win. Jayden Brown added 16 points, and Abdul Momoh had 13 points for Central Connecticut. AJ Dancler scored a game-high 25 points and added four rebounds, four assists and three steals for the Dolphins. Nate Fouts had 22 points, seven rebounds and seven assists for Le Moyne.

Fairleigh Dickinson became the third team to secure home-court advantage for the NEC tournament quarterfinals with an 82–69 home win over Stonehill on February 27. Terrence Brown scored 23 points and had five assists and three steals to lead the Knights. Dylan Jones added 17 points for Fairleigh Dickinson. Louie Semona finished with 24 points and nine rebounds, and Hermann Koffi added 16 points for the Skyhawks.

Saint Francis needed overtime to secure the no. 3 seed and home-court advantage in the quarterfinals of the NEC tournament in an 80–71 home victory over Chicago State on March 1. Riley Parker scored 22 points to lead the Red Flash. Chris Moncrief added 12 points and five steals for Saint Francis. Quincy Allen had 22 points and seven rebounds for the Cougars.

=== Conference matrix ===
The table below summarizes the head-to-head results between teams in conference regular-season play. The home team's score is shown in boldface type.

	Central Connecticut	Chicago State	Fairleigh Dickinson	Le Moyne	LIU	Mercyhurst	Saint Francis	Stonehill	Wagner
vs. Central Connecticut	–	64–**81**; **75**–81	**60**–71; 66–**87**	**70**–93; 75–**84**	54–**52**; **50**–63	**50**–62; 63–**73**	**59**–74; 67–**83**	**63**–71; 41–**67**	62–**57**; **48**–55
vs. Chicago State	**81**–64; 81–**75**	–	58–**48**; **91**–49	72–**88**; **80**–75	**53**–39; 67–**73**^{OT}	78–**85**; **90**–68	81–**69**; **80**–71^{OT}	68–**52**; **75**–73	**52**–64; 64–**52**
vs. Fairleigh Dickinson	71–**60**; **87**–66	**48**–58; 49–**91**	–	**86**–91^{2OT} 74–**78**	**62**–58; 74–**55**	67–**60**; **65**–60	75–**71**; **85**–80^{OT}	**54**–65; 69–**82**	**59**–71; 58–**69**
vs. Le Moyne	93–**70**; **84**–75	**88**–72; 75–**80**	91–**86**^{2OT} **78**–74	–	**78**–62; 76–**61**	63–**79**; **82**–78	**86**–78; 81–**76**^{OT}	72–**73**; **85**–79	**73**–61; 68–**72**^{OT}
vs. LIU	**52**–54; 63–**50**	39–**53**; **73**–67^{OT}	58–**62**; **55**–74	62–**78**; **61**–76	–	63–**72**^{OT}; **85**–80^{2OT}	51–**64**; **74**–64	**60**–70; 59–**62**	**47**–60; 47–**60**
vs. Mercyhurst	62–**50**; **73**–63	**85**–78; 68–**90**	**60**–67; 60–**65**	**79**–63; 78–**82**	**72**–63^{OT}; 80–**85**^{2OT}	–	**73**–59; 58–**62**	69–**76**; **85**–73	**65**–69; 66–**71**
vs. Saint Francis	74–**59**; **83**–67	**69**–81; 71–**80**^{OT}	**71**–75; 80–**85**^{OT}	78–**86**; **76**–81^{OT}	**64**–51; 64–**74**	59–**73**; **62**–58	–	64–**60**; **79**–74	**70**–68^{2OT} 68–**66**
vs. Stonehill	71–**63**; **67**–41	**52**–68; 73–**75**	65–**54**; **82**–69	**73**–72; 79–**85**	70–**60**; **62**–59	**76**–69; 73–**85**	**60**–64; 74–**79**	–	61–**73**; **63**–57
vs. Wagner	**57**–62; 55–**48**	64–**52**; **52**–64	71–**59**; **69**–58	61–**73**; **72**–68^{OT}	60–**47**; **60**–47	69–**65**; **71**–66	68–**70**^{2OT} **66**–68	**73**–61; 57–**63**	–
Record	**14–2**	**4–12**	**8–8**	**4–12**	**12–4**	**9–7**	**8–8**	**7–9**	**6–10**

== Record against other conferences ==
Regular season

NEC vs. power conferences	Record
ACC	0–8
Big East	0–10
Big Ten	0–7
Big 12	0–1
SEC	0–3
NEC vs. power conferences total	0–29
Other NCAA Division I conferences	Record
America East	5–5
American	1–0
ASUN	0–1
Atlantic 10	2–8
Big Sky	1–0
Big South	0–3
Big West	0–2
CAA	1–2
CUSA	0–0
Horizon League	0–3
Ivy League	1–2
MAAC	6–9
Mid-American	0–1
MEAC	3–0
MVC	0–1
MWC	1–1
OVC	1–1
Patriot League	4–5
SoCon	0–1
Southland	2–2
SWAC	0–0
Summit	0–1
Sun Belt	0–0
WAC	0–2
WCC	0–2
Other Division I total	28–52
NCAA Division I total	28–81
NCAA Division III	15–0
USCAA Division I	1–0
USCAA Division II	5–0
Grand total	49–81
Through games of March 18, 2025

Postseason

NEC vs. power conferences	Record
ACC	0–0
Big East	0–0
Big Ten	0–0
Big 12	0–0
SEC	0–0
NEC vs. power conferences total	0–0
Other NCAA Division I conferences	Record
America East	0–0
American	0–0
ASUN	0–0
Atlantic 10	0–0
Big Sky	0–0
Big South	0–0
Big West	0–0
CAA	0–0
CUSA	0–0
Horizon League	0–0
Ivy League	0–0
MAAC	0–0
Mid-American	0–0
MEAC	0–0
MVC	0–0
MWC	0–0
OVC	0–0
Patriot League	0–0
SoCon	0–0
Southland	0–0
SWAC	0–1
Summit	0–0
Sun Belt	0–0
WAC	0–0
WCC	0–0
Other Division I total	0–1
NCAA Division I total	0–1

=== Games against ranked non-conference opponents ===
The table below shows games played by NEC teams against opponents ranked by the Associated Press at the time of the game.

Date	Visitor	Home	Site	Score	NEC record
Nov. 4	LIU	No. 24 Ole Miss	SJB Pavilion ● Oxford, MS	Ole Miss, 90−60	0−1
Nov. 6	Wagner	No. 25 Rutgers	Jersey Mike's Arena ● Piscataway, NJ	Rutgers, 75−52	0−2
Nov. 10	Fairleigh Dickinson	No. 15 Creighton	CHI Health Center Omaha ● Omaha, NE	Creighton, 96−70	0−3
Nov. 13	Le Moyne	No. 3 UConn	XL Center ● Hartford, CT	UConn, 90−49	0−4
Nov. 13	Wagner	No. 22 St. John's	Carnesecca Arena ● Queens, NY	St. John's 66−45	0−5
Nov. 27	Stonehill	No. 10 Marquette	Fiserv Forum ● Milwaukee, WI	Marquette, 94−59	0−6
Nov. 30	Chicago State	No. 15 Wisconsin	Kohl Center ● Madison, WI	Wisconsin, 74−53	0−7

== Rankings ==
The table below shows the rankings of NEC teams among the 364 Division I teams throughout the season. The preseason ranking is the Pomeroy rating. The remaining weekly rankings are the NET rankings reported by the NCAA beginning with the initial release at the start of week 5. NET rankings are not updated during the NCAA tournament. The rankings shown for week 20 are the final rankings at the conclusion of regular-season and conference-tournament play.

Legend
Increase in ranking
Decrease in ranking

	Pre	Week 5	Week 6	Week 7	Week 8	Week 9	Week 10	Week 11	Week 12	Week 13	Week 14	Week 15	Week 16	Week 17	Week 18	Week 19	Week 20	Final
Central Connecticut	303	204	141	134	135	134	135	185	188	180	167	163	160	154	157	157	168	171
Chicago State	340	359	360	358	356	357	354	354	353	355	355	355	356	358	359	358	358	358
Fairleigh Dickinson	352	338	339	329	319	318	304	311	322	302	311	312	300	310	313	301	303	301
Le Moyne	335	283	328	326	313	323	335	333	340	346	348	347	349	350	350	349	350	350
LIU	354	307	314	303	317	319	301	281	277	298	307	296	298	291	277	283	280	280
Mercyhurst	356	321	338	342	340	344	337	347	345	341	338	338	340	338	335	336	336	338
Saint Francis	351	238	240	257	299	299	320	309	321	318	323	315	321	314	314	308	297	299
Stonehill	358	268	265	267	274	269	268	275	268	295	291	294	293	304	304	311	312	312
Wagner	272	323	317	297	318	315	345	339	344	336	332	343	345	337	340	339	339	339

== Postseason ==
=== NEC tournament ===
Games were played on March 5, 8 and 11, 2025, at campus sites. Since Mercyhurst was ineligible, all eight eligible teams in the conference participated. No. 3 seed Saint Francis beat the no. 2 and no. 1 seeds on the road en route to the tournament title. The Red Flash topped no. 1 seed Central Connecticut in the final, 46–43, and earned their first NEC tournament championship since 1991. It was the first NEC tournament championship for head coach Rob Krimmel, who earned his first trip to the NCAA tournament. Tournament MVP Juan Cranford Jr. became the fourth player to win the award after being named NEC rookie of the year in the same season. The Blue Devils saw their 14-game winning streak, the longest active streak in Division I, come to an end.

Quarterfinals; Wednesday, March 5 NEC Front Row
1	Central Connecticut	86
8	Le Moyne	67
4	Fairleigh Dickinson	71
5	Stonehill	56
Pairings are reseeded after the quarterfinals.
2	LIU	68
7	Chicago State	57
3	Saint Francis	58
6	Wagner	55

Semifinals; Saturday, March 8 YES/SNP/NESN+/NESN Nation/ESPN+
1	Central Connecticut	76^{OT}
4	Fairleigh Dickinson	72
2	LIU	68
3	Saint Francis	71

Championship; Tuesday, March 11; ESPN2
1	Central Connecticut	43
3	Saint Francis	46

=== NCAA tournament ===
As champion of the NEC tournament, Saint Francis automatically qualified for the NCAA tournament. Saint Francis was the no. 68 overall seed of the 68 teams participating, and matched against Alabama State in a South Region First Four game between no. 16 regional seeds.

During warm-ups before the First Four game, the officials asked several Saint Francis players to remove the black undershirts they were wearing. The Red Flash were wearing red jerseys, and NCAA rules require undershirts to match in color. Saint Francis shot 59% from the floor and hit on 6 of 12 triples in the first half, building a lead as large as nine points, and held a five-point edge at intermission. Alabama State gradually battled back and took their first second-half lead, 62–60, with 3:46 to play. A layup by Juan Cranford Jr. tied the score, but the Hornets scored the next four points and led, 66–62, with 1:36 remaining. Cranford's three-pointer cut the deficit to one point, but Alabama State scored again. Chris Moncrief tied the score at 68, hitting a three-pointer with 40 seconds to go. The Hornets had a chance regain the lead but missed the front end of a one-and-one with 12 seconds on the clock. Valentino Pinedo rebounded the miss for the Red Flash, but Cranford turned the ball over with 3.4 seconds to play. Micah Simpson's long pass from his own baseline into the lane was deflected and retrieved by Amarr Knox, who hit a layup with one second remaining to give Alabama State the lead. The Red Flash's desperation shot at the buzzer was short, and the Hornets earned a 70–68 victory. Cranford led Saint Francis with 18 points and eight rebounds and added two assists and a block. Pinedo finished with 17 points, two rebounds, two assists and a steal. Moncrief had 17 points, five rebounds, three assists, two blocks and a steal. Riley Parker added 12 points, five rebounds, an assist, a steal and a blocked shot, and Wisler Sanon had two points, five rebounds and a game-high four assists for Saint Francis. The Red Flash were the 19th team to qualify for the NCAA tournament with a losing record. None of the 19 have earned a win. Saint Francis finished their season 16–18.

Seed	Region	School	First Four
16	South	Saint Francis	L 68–70 vs. (16) Alabama State

=== National Invitation Tournament ===
Under a qualification system revised for the 2025 tournament, an exempt bid to the 2025 National Invitation Tournament (NIT) was available for one team from each of the 12 conferences, other than the Atlantic Coast Conference (ACC) and the Southeastern Conference (SEC), with the highest KenPom conference ratings as of the morning of Selection Sunday, March 16, 2025. The exempt bid is granted to the conference member with the highest KNIT score, which is an average of the ESPN Basketball Power Index (BPI), the Kevin Pauga Index (KPI), the NET ranking, the KenPom rating, Strength of Record (SOR), the Bart Torvik ranking (TOR) and the Wins above Bubble (WAB) ranking. The NEC did not rank among the top 12 conferences other than the ACC and SEC.

As a regular-season conference champion that did not win its conference tournament, Central Connecticut could have automatically qualified for the NIT, if the Blue Devils had a KNIT score of 125 or better. Central Connecticut's final KNIT score is summarized in the table below.

Metric	Rank/ score
BPI	167
KPI	183
NET	168
KenPom	183
SOR	113
TOR	194
WAB	103
KNIT (average)	159

Since Central Connecticut's final KNIT score was not 125 or better, they did not qualify for an automatic bid to the NIT.

== Awards and honors ==
=== All-NEC honors and awards ===
At the conclusion of the regular season, the conference selected outstanding performers based on a poll of league coaches. Below are the results.

Honor	Recipient	School
Player of the Year	Jordan Jones (Senior, Guard)	Central Connecticut
Coach of the Year	Patrick Sellers	Central Connecticut
Defensive Player of the Year	Abdul Momoh (Junior, Forward)	Central Connecticut
Rookie of the Year	Juan Cranford Jr. (Freshman, Guard)	Saint Francis
Most Improved Player of the Year	Terrence Brown (Sophomore, Guard)	Fairleigh Dickinson
All-NEC First Team	Terrence Brown (Sophomore, Guard)	Fairleigh Dickinson
All-NEC First Team	Malachi Davis ( (redshirt) Junior, Guard)	LIU
All-NEC First Team	Jordan Jones (Senior, Guard)	Central Connecticut
All-NEC First Team	Riley Parker (Junior, Guard)	Saint Francis
All-NEC First Team	Jeff Planutis (Graduate, Forward)	Mercyhurst
All-NEC Second Team	AJ Dancler (Sophomore, Guard)	Le Moyne
All-NEC Second Team	Jamal Fuller (Senior, Forward)	LIU
All-NEC Second Team	Devin Haid (Junior, Guard)	Central Connecticut
All-NEC Second Team	Aidan Reichert (Senior, Forward)	Mercyhurst
All-NEC Second Team	Louie Semona (Sophomore, Forward)	Stonehill
All-NEC Third Team	Todd Brogna (Sophomore, Forward)	Stonehill
All-NEC Third Team	Jalen Forrest (Junior, Guard)	Chicago State
All-NEC Third Team	Abdul Momoh (Junior, Forward)	Central Connecticut
All-NEC Third Team	Valentino Pinedo (Junior, Forward)	Saint Francis
All-NEC Third Team	Zaire Williams (Senior, Guard)	Wagner
All-NEC Defensive Team	Brent Davis (Senior, Guard)	LIU
All-NEC Defensive Team	Javier Ezquerra (Senior, Guard)	Wagner
All-NEC Defensive Team	Abdul Momoh (Junior, Forward)	Central Connecticut
All-NEC Defensive Team	Bismark Nsiah (Graduate, Forward)	Fairleigh Dickinson
All-NEC Defensive Team	Zaire Williams (Senior, Guard)	Wagner
All-NEC Rookie Team	Jeremy Clayville (Freshman, Guard)	Saint Francis
All-NEC Rookie Team	Juan Cranford Jr. (Freshman, Guard)	Saint Francis
All-NEC Rookie Team	Hermann Koffi (Freshman, Guard)	Stonehill
All-NEC Rookie Team	Shadrak Lasu (Freshman, Forward)	LIU
All-NEC Rookie Team	Darin Smith Jr. ( (redshirt) Freshman, Forward)	Central Connecticut

=== Weekly conference awards ===
Throughout the regular season, the Northeast Conference named players of the week and rookies of the week.

Week	Player of the week	Rookie of the week
1 – November 11, 2024	Jordan Jones, CCSU	Darin Smith Jr., CCSU
2 – November 18, 2024	Terrence Brown, FDU	Darin Smith Jr. (2), CCSU
3 – November 25, 2024	Malachi Davis, LIU	Shadrak Lasu, LIU
4 – December 2, 2024	Josh Morgan, STO	Darin Smith Jr. (3), CCSU
5 – December 9, 2024	Devin Haid, CCSU	Troy McKoy Jr., CHST
6 – December 16, 2024	Devin Haid (2), CCSU	Jakob Blakley, LEM
7 – December 23, 2024	Devin Haid (3), CCSU	Juan Cranford Jr., SFU
8 – December 30, 2024	Tyree Barba-Bey, FDU	Hermann Koffi, STO
9 – January 7, 2025	Terrence Brown (2), FDU	Hermann Koffi (2), STO
10 – January 14, 2025	Malachi Davis (2), LIU	Jeremy Clayville, SFU
11 – January 22, 2025	Malachi Davis (3), LIU	Hermann Koffi (3), STO
12 – January 28, 2025	Terrence Brown (3), FDU	Juan Cranford Jr. (2), SFU
12 – January 28, 2025	Devin Haid (4), CCSU	Juan Cranford Jr. (2), SFU
13 – February 3, 2025	Jordan Jones (2), CCSU	Shadrak Lasu (2), LIU
14 – February 10, 2025	Jalen Forrest, CHST	Juan Cranford Jr. (3), SFU
14 – February 10, 2025	Devin Haid (5), CCSU	Juan Cranford Jr. (3), SFU
15 – February 17, 2025	Jordan Jones (3), CCSU	Deng Garang, LEM
16 - February 24, 2025	Riley Parker, SFU	Juan Cranford Jr. (4), SFU
16 - February 24, 2025	Riley Parker, SFU	Deng Garang (2), LEM
17 – March 3, 2025	Jeff Planutis, MER	Darin Smith Jr. (4), CCSU

School	Player of the week awards	Rookie of the week awards
Central Connecticut	8	4
Chicago State	1	1
Fairleigh Dickinson	4	0
Le Moyne	0	3
LIU	3	2
Mercyhurst	1	0
Saint Francis	1	5
Stonehill	1	3
Wagner	0	0

=== NABC Honors Court ===
The National Association of Basketball Coaches (NABC) recognizes junior, senior and graduate student players who maintained a 3.2 grade-point average by naming them to the NABC Honors Court. The following NEC players were honored by the NABC for the 2024–25 season:

Recipient	School
Joe Ostrowsky (Senior, Guard)	Central Connecticut
Riley Parker (Junior, Guard)	Saint Francis
Daniele Russo (Junior, Forward)	Central Connecticut
Brendan Scanlon (Senior, Guard)	Saint Francis
K.J. Swain Jr. (Junior, Guard)	Saint Francis
Davonte Sweatman (Senior, Guard)	Central Connecticut

== Statistics ==
Team statistics
		Points					FG%		3-Pt%			Rebounds			Assists		Blocks		Steals	
Team	GP	For	Avg	Opp	Avg	Diff	For	Opp	For	Opp	FT%	For	Opp	Net	For	Avg	For	Avg	For	Avg
Central Connecticut	32	2,312	72.2	2,012	62.9	300	47.6%	41.2%	34.6%	30.8%	74.2%	1,137	1,027	110	456	14.3	134	4.19	242	7.56
Chicago State	32	2,001	62.5	2,518	78.7	-517	38.2%	47.8%	30.6%	35.8%	70.5%	981	1,295	-314	344	10.8	114	3.56	235	7.34
Fairleigh Dickinson	33	2,431	73.7	2,415	73.2	16	43.6%	44.1%	33.6%	30.1%	71.1%	1,120	1,229	-109	449	13.6	89	2.70	229	6.94
Le Moyne	32	2,371	74.1	2,566	80.2	-195	45.8%	46.2%	33.9%	36.5%	70.3%	1,051	1,145	-94	454	14.2	68	2.13	222	6.94
LIU	33	2,235	67.7	2,156	65.3	79	43.5%	41.0%	31.0%	30.9%	71.8%	1,172	1,049	123	388	11.8	117	3.55	269	8.15
Mercyhurst	31	2,105	67.9	2,167	69.9	-62	43.2%	46.7%	35.1%	35.1%	80.2%	849	1,046	-197	417	13.5	67	2.16	227	7.32
Saint Francis	34	2,415	71.0	2,433	71.6	-18	46.2%	43.2%	34.2%	30.9%	72.7%	1,155	1,169	-14	484	14.2	85	2.50	212	6.24
Stonehill	32	2,198	68.7	2,242	70.1	-44	43.4%	44.5%	35.5%	34.8%	72.4%	1,060	1,068	-8	461	14.4	84	2.63	206	6.44
Wagner	30	1,874	62.5	1,818	60.6	56	40.6%	42.2%	33.4%	33.2%	70.6%	1,047	904	143	378	12.6	47	1.57	212	7.07

Individual scoring average
Rk	Player	School	PPG
1	Terrence Brown	Fairleigh Dickinson	20.6
2	Malachi Davis	LIU	17.7
3	Jeff Planutis	Mercyhurst	15.5
4	AJ Dancler	Le Moyne	15.1
5	Jordan Jones	Central Connecticut	14.3

Individual field-goal percentage
Rk	Player	Team	FG%
1	Dwayne Koroma	Le Moyne	71.4%
2	Abdul Momoh	Central Connecticut	59.2%
3	Valentino Pinedo	Saint Francis	56.9%
4	Todd Brogna	Stonehill	50.2%
5	Devin Haid	Central Connecticut	49.3%

Individual three-point field-goal percentage
Rk	Player	Team	3FG%
1	Darin Smith Jr.	Sacred Heart	46.3%
2	Zae Blake	Wagner	41.6%
3	Jeff Planutis	Mercyhurst	41.2%
4	AJ Dancler	Le Moyne	40.4%
5	Ethan Meuser	Stonehill	39.7%

Individual free-throw percentage
Rk	Player	Team	FT%
1	Bernie Blunt	Mercyhurst	92.6%
2	Todd Brogna	Stonehill	90.7%
3	Jeff Planutis	Mercyhurst	88.5%
4	Devin Haid	Central Connecticut	84.7%
5	Jordan Jones	Central Connecticut	83.1%

Individual rebounds per game
Rk	Player	Team	RPG
1	Shadrak Lasu	LIU	7.3
2	Dwayne Koroma	Le Moyne	7.2
3	Todd Brogna	Stonehill	6.8
4	Valentino Pinedo	Saint Francis	6.4
5	Bismark Nsiah	Fairleigh Dickinson	6.3

Individual assists per game
Rk	Player	Team	APG
1	Javier Ezquerra	Wagner	4.6
2	Terell Strickland	LIU	4.3
3	Shemar Rathan-Mayes	Mercyhurst	3.9
4	Jordan Jones	Central Connecticut	3.5
5	AJ Dancler	Le Moyne	3.4

Individual blocks per game
Rk	Player	Team	BPG
1	Abdul Momoh	Central Connecticut	1.61
2	Shadrak Lasu	LIU	1.35
3	Bismark Nsiah	Fairleigh Dickinson	1.03
4	Jayden Brown	Central Connecticut	0.88
5	Ethan Meuser	Stonehill	0.87

Individual steals per game
Rk	Player	Team	SPG
1	Terrence Brown	Fairleigh Dickinson	2.16
2	Malachi Davis	LIU	1.84
3	Zaire Williams	Wagner	1.77
4	Bernie Blunt	Mercyhurst	1.70
5	Chas Stinson	Stonehill	1.69

== Attendance ==
Team	**Arena**	**Capacity**	Game 1	Game 2	Game 3	Game 4	Game 5	Game 6	Game 7	Game 8	**Total**	**Average**	**Pct. of capacity**
**Team**	**Arena**	**Capacity**	Game 9	Game 10	Game 11	Game 12	Game 13	Game 14	Game 15	Game 16	**Total**	**Average**	**Pct. of capacity**
Central Connecticut	William H. Detrick Gymnasium	2,654	1,762	888	871	1,144	739	1,303	816	1,126	22,287	1,393	52%
Central Connecticut	William H. Detrick Gymnasium	2,654	1,133	1,042	1,071	1,650	1,008	2,013	2,517	**3,204**†	22,287	1,393	52%
Chicago State	Jones Convocation Center	7,000	630†	101	145	216	200	185	85	275	2,367	237	3%
Chicago State	Jones Convocation Center	7,000	295	235							2,367	237	3%
Fairleigh Dickinson	Bogota Savings Bank Center	1,852	375	**2,498**†	1,076	486	376	753	176	508	8,934	638	34%
Fairleigh Dickinson	Bogota Savings Bank Center	1,852	346	246	257	250	587	1,000			8,934	638	34%
Le Moyne	Ted Grant Court	2,000	497	507	803	1,162†	306	491	479	573	7,522	579	29%
Le Moyne	Ted Grant Court	2,000	370	472	520	481	861				7,522	579	29%
LIU	Steinberg Wellness Center; Barclays Center	2,500 (Steinberg); 17,732 (Barclays)	242	NR	241	343	318	350 (Note: Game played at Barclays Center. Remainder of home games played at Steinberg Wellness Center.)	129	304	4,382	313	9% (Note: Based on weighted-average capacity of 3,588)
LIU	Steinberg Wellness Center; Barclays Center	2,500 (Steinberg); 17,732 (Barclays)	250	276	317	222	499	278	613†		4,382	313	9%
Mercyhurst	Owen McCormick Court	1,100	702	987†	503	300	154	187	246	412	6,773	521	47%
Mercyhurst	Owen McCormick Court	1,100	310	755	684	879	654				6,773	521	47%
Saint Francis	DeGol Arena	3,500	886	846	672	759	333	385	407	665	9,554	735	21%
Saint Francis	DeGol Arena	3,500	969	1,017†	992	NR	899	724			9,554	735	21%
Stonehill	Merkert Gymnasium	1,560	750	1,324†	1,052	722	112	390	625	1,265	11,126	795	51%
Stonehill	Merkert Gymnasium	1,560	974	872	411	727	848	1,054			11,126	795	51%
Wagner	Spiro Sports Center	2,100	529	105	201	407	232	147	191	704	7,625	545	30%
Wagner	Spiro Sports Center	2,100	217	250	807	1,035	1,098	1,702†			7,625	545	30%

† Season high
Figures in bold indicate attendance was at or exceeded capacity.
NR = Attendance not reported for this game. The game is ignored in computation of totals and averages.

== Media coverage ==
ESPNU televised one conference regular-season game. YES televised two conference regular-season games and both conference tournament semifinal games. SportsNet Pittsburgh broadcast one of the regular-season games shown by YES as well as both tournament semifinal games. The other regular-season game shown by YES was broadcast by SportsNet Pittsburgh+. One of the regular-season games shown by YES and one of the conference tournament semifinal games were broadcast by NESN+, and the other regular-season and tournament semifinal games were streamed by NESN Nation. A simulcast of all four games broadcast by YES was streamed by ESPN+. In addition to the YES simulcasts, ESPN+ exclusively streamed two other conference regular-season games. The conference tournament final was televised by ESPN2. All home games of NEC teams not televised by a conference media partner were streamed by NEC Front Row, the conference's streaming platform.

YES advised that it may show the conference semifinal games on tape delay, if they conflicted with New York Yankees spring training games. The Yankees had a spring training road game at 6 p.m. on March 8, that was not televised by YES, which broadcast both NEC semifinal games live.

The 2025 NEC tournament final marked the 38th consecutive year that the conference's championship game was broadcast on linear television by an ESPN network.

In addition to the conference's television agreements, four Fairleigh Dickinson home games were broadcast by YES.
