= 2023–24 Chicago State Cougars men's basketball team =

American college basketball season

2023–24 Chicago State Cougars men's basketball
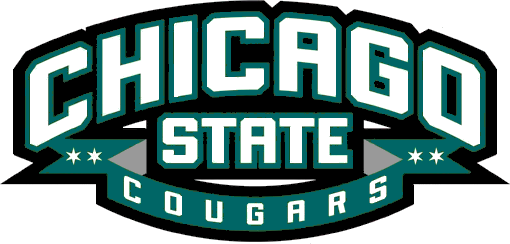

CBI, Quarterfinals
- Conference: Independent
- Record: 13–19
- Head coach: Gerald Gillion (3rd season)
- Associate head coach: Baronton Terry
- Assistant coaches: Jelani Hewitt; Scott Spinelli
- Home arena: Jones Convocation Center

2023–24 NCAA Division I men's basketball independents standings
	Conf.				Overall
Team	W		L	PCT	W		L	PCT
Chicago State		–		–	13	–	19	.406

The 2023–24 Chicago State Cougars men's basketball team represented Chicago State University during the 2023–24 NCAA Division I men's basketball season. The Cougars, led by third-year head coach Gerald Gillion, played their home games at the Jones Convocation Center located in Chicago, Illinois and competed as an independent with no conference affiliation. They finished the season 13–19.

On December 13, 2023, the Cougars upset the 25th-ranked Northwestern Wildcats 75–73 at Welsh–Ryan Arena, marking Chicago State's first-ever win over a ranked team.

On April 12, 2024, head coach Gerald Gillion left the school to become the associate head coach at LIU.

The season was the Cougars' final season as an independent, with the university joining the Northeast Conference in July 2024.

== Previous season ==
The Cougars finished the 2022–23 season 11–20. As an independent, they did not participate in any conference tournament or postseason play.

== Roster ==
2023–24 Chicago State Cougars men's basketball team
Players
Coaches

Pos.	#	Name	Height	Weight	Year	Hometown
G	0	Greg Spate	6 ft 7 in (2.01 m)	185 lb (84 kg)	Fr	Plantation, Florida
G	1	Wesley Cardet Jr.	6 ft 6 in (1.98 m)	204 lb (93 kg)	Jr	Tallahassee, Florida
G	2	Deshawn Jean-Charles	6 ft 7 in (2.01 m)	200 lb (91 kg)	So	Fort Lauderdale, Florida
F	3	Matt Bewley	6 ft 9 in (2.06 m)	225 lb (102 kg)	Fr	Lauderhill, Florida
F	4	Ryan Bewley	6 ft 9 in (2.06 m)	228 lb (103 kg)	Fr	Lauderhill, Florida
G	5	Kedrick Green	6 ft 0 in (1.83 m)	200 lb (91 kg)	Jr	Lithonia, Georgia
G	10	A.J. Neal	6 ft 2 in (1.88 m)	180 lb (82 kg)	So	Orlando, Florida
G	12	Brent Davis	6 ft 3 in (1.91 m)	190 lb (86 kg)	Jr	Miramar, Florida
G	13	Tristan Arneaud	5 ft 10 in (1.78 m)	165 lb (75 kg)	So	Davie, Florida
F	15	Noble Crawford	6 ft 5 in (1.96 m)	195 lb (88 kg)	Jr	Deltona, Florida
F	22	Cameron Jernigan	6 ft 7 in (2.01 m)	220 lb (100 kg)	Jr	Gary, Indiana
F	23	Tehshaundre Cole	6 ft 5 in (1.96 m)	215 lb (98 kg)	So	Toronto, Ontario
G	24	Jahsean Corbett	6 ft 7 in (2.01 m)	210 lb (95 kg)	Jr	Orlando, Florida
G	25	Alex Raiford	6 ft 3 in (1.91 m)	170 lb (77 kg)	Jr	Chicago, Illinois

Head coach

- Gerald Gillion (Florida State)

Assistant coach(es)

- Baronton Terry
- Jelani Hewitt (Georgia Southern)
- Scott Spinelli (Boston University)

Legend

- (C) Team captain
- (S) Suspended
- (I) Ineligible
- (W) Walk-on
- Injured
- Current redshirt

Roster
Last update: November 19, 2023

== Schedule and results ==
Date time, TV	Rank^{#}	Opponent^{#}	Result	Record	High points	High rebounds	High assists	Site (attendance) city, state
Regular season
November 6, 2023*; 7:00 p.m., ESPN+		at Bowling Green	L 41–70	0–1	12 – Cardet Jr.	10 – Jean-Charles	4 – Cardet Jr.	Stroh Center (1,776); Bowling Green, OH
November 9, 2023*; 7:00 p.m.		Mercer	L 61–66	0–2	17 – Cardet Jr.	10 – Corbett	5 – Cardet Jr.	Jones Convocation Center (233); Chicago, IL
November 12, 2023*; 3:30 p.m., ESPN+		at Southern Indiana	W 78–67	1–2	21 – Cardet Jr.	7 – Jean-Charles	8 – Green	Screaming Eagles Arena (1,959); Evansville, IN
November 14, 2023*; 7:00 p.m.		Cal State Northridge	L 64–74	1–3	21 – Cardet Jr.	8 – Corbett	3 – Corbett	Jones Convocation Center (275); Chicago, IL
November 16, 2023*; 7:00 p.m., ESPN+		at Southern Illinois; Cancún Challenge campus game	L 55–71	1–4	15 – Cardet Jr.	8 – Corbett	2 – Jean-Charles	Banterra Center (3,910); Carbondale, IL
November 21, 2023*; 2:00 p.m., FloHoops		vs. Northern Colorado; Cancún Challenge Mayan Semifinals	L 77–78 ^{OT}	1–5	24 – Cardet	7 – Tied	2 – Tied	Hard Rock Hotel (200); Riviera Maya, Mexico
November 22, 2023*; 11:30 a.m., FloHoops		vs. Morgan State; Cancún Challenge Mayan 3rd place game	W 84–83	2–5	18 – Corbett	8 – Corbett	4 – Cardet	Hard Rock Hotel (107); Riviera Maya, Mexico
November 25, 2023*; 2:00 p.m.		UT Martin	L 71–94	2–6	26 – Cardet, Jr.	7 – Jean-Charles	4 – Green	Jones Convocation Center (76); Chicago, IL
November 28, 2023*; 7:00 p.m., ESPN+		at Loyola Chicago	L 53–62	2–7	14 – Corbett	6 – Corbett	4 – Corbett	Joseph J. Gentile Arena (2,003); Chicago, IL
November 30, 2023*; 7:00 p.m.		Delaware State	L 69–76	2–8	22 – Cardet Jr.	6 – Davis	3 – Jean-Charles	Jones Convocation Center (111); Chicago, IL
December 3, 2023*; 1:00 p.m.		Stetson	W 77–54	3–8	23 – Corbett	9 – Tied	5 – Cardet Jr.	Jones Convocation Center (116); Chicago, IL
December 10, 2023*; 2:00 p.m.		St. Thomas	L 50–66	3–9	12 – Tied	10 – Corbett	3 – Tied	Jones Convocation Center (127); Chicago, IL
December 13, 2023*; 7:00 p.m., BTN		at No. 25 Northwestern	W 75–73	4–9	30 – Cardet Jr.	8 – Crawford	4 – Tied	Welsh–Ryan Arena (4,153); Evanston, IL
December 16, 2023*; 3:00 p.m., ESPN+		at Valparaiso	W 63–62	5–9	28 – Cardet Jr.	8 – Corbett	5 – Green	Athletics–Recreation Center (1,222); Valparaiso, IN
December 18, 2023*; 7:00 p.m.		UT Rio Grande Valley	W 78–68	6–9	20 – Cardet Jr.	9 – Corbett	4 – Green	Jones Convocation Center (72); Chicago, IL
December 20, 2023*; 7:00 p.m.		Bethune–Cookman	W 55–54	7–9	17 – Cardet Jr.	7 – Tied	4 – Cardet Jr.	Jones Convocation Center (693); Chicago, IL
December 22, 2023*; 7:00 p.m., BTN		at No. 24 Wisconsin	L 53–80	7–10	10 – Cardet Jr.	7 – Corbett	2 – Cardet Jr.	Kohl Center (14,104); Madison, WI
December 27, 2023*; 9:00 p.m.		at California Baptist	L 62–74	7–11	27 – Cardet Jr.	8 – Corbett	5 – Cardet Jr.	Fowler Events Center (2,518); Riverside, CA
December 30, 2023*; 3:00 p.m., FS1		at DePaul	L 58–70	7–12	18 – Cardet Jr.	7 – Corbett	3 – Cardet Jr.	Wintrust Arena (3,806); Chicago, IL
January 2, 2024*; 7:00 p.m., ESPN+		at Kansas State	L 55–62	7–13	19 – Cardet Jr.	8 – Corbett	2 – Tied	Bramlage Coliseum (9,123); Manhattan, KS
January 3, 2024*; 6:00 p.m., ESPN+		at Oklahoma State	L 53–72	7–14	20 – Cardet Jr.	7 – Corbett	3 – Cardet Jr.	Gallagher-Iba Arena (5,142); Stillwater, OK
January 7, 2024*; 3:00 p.m., ESPN+		at UTEP	L 69–74	7–15	23 – Corbett	10 – Corbett	2 – Tied	Don Haskins Center (3,632); El Paso, TX
January 10, 2024*; 6:00 p.m., YES		at Fairleigh Dickinson	W 75–74	8–15	19 – Crawford	9 – Crawford	5 – Arneaud	Rothman Center (153); Hackensack, NJ
January 15, 2024*; 6:00 p.m., ESPN+		at Stetson	W 77–70	9–15	29 – Cardet Jr.	8 – Corbett	7 – Neal	Edmunds Center (723); DeLand, FL
January 19, 2024*; 7:00 p.m.		East–West	W 131–55	10–15	27 – Corbett	19 – Corbett	11 – Corbett	Jones Convocation Center (94); Chicago, IL
January 21, 2024*; 4:00 p.m.		Saint Xavier	W 108–58	11–15	27 – Cardet Jr.	11 – Jernigan	6 – Arneaud	Jones Convocation Center (250); Chicago, IL
January 31, 2024*; 6:00 p.m., ESPN+		at Duquesne	L 60–65	11–16	21 – Corbett	11 – Corbett	4 – Cardet Jr.	UPMC Cooper Fieldhouse (2,366); Pittsburgh, PA
February 10, 2024*; 3:00 p.m.		at South Carolina State	L 55–78	11–17	20 – Corbett	5 – Jernigan	3 – Jernigan	SHM Memorial Center (576); Orangeburg, SC
February 14, 2024*; 6:00 p.m., ESPN+		at Eastern Kentucky	L 73–86	11–18	16 – Tied	13 – Jernigan	4 – Corbett	Baptist Health Arena (2,391); Richmond, KY
February 19, 2024*; 1:00 p.m.		IU Northwest	W 93–70	12–18	25 – Corbett	18 – Jernigan	4 – Tied	Jones Convocation Center (458); Chicago, IL
CBI
March 23, 2024; 2:30 p.m., FloHoops	(15)	vs. (2) UC San Diego; First round	W 77–75	13–18	30 – Cardet Jr.	9 – Corbett	4 – Cardet Jr.	Ocean Center; Daytona Beach, FL
March 25, 2024; 3:30 p.m., FloHoops	(15)	vs. (7) Fairfield; Quarterfinals	L 74–77	13–19	25 – Cardet Jr.	7 – Jernigan	5 – Neal	Ocean Center; Daytona Beach, FL
*Non-conference game. ^{#}Rankings from AP Poll. (#) Tournament seedings in parentheses. All times are in Central.
