= Scott Spinelli =

American college basketball coach (born 1966)

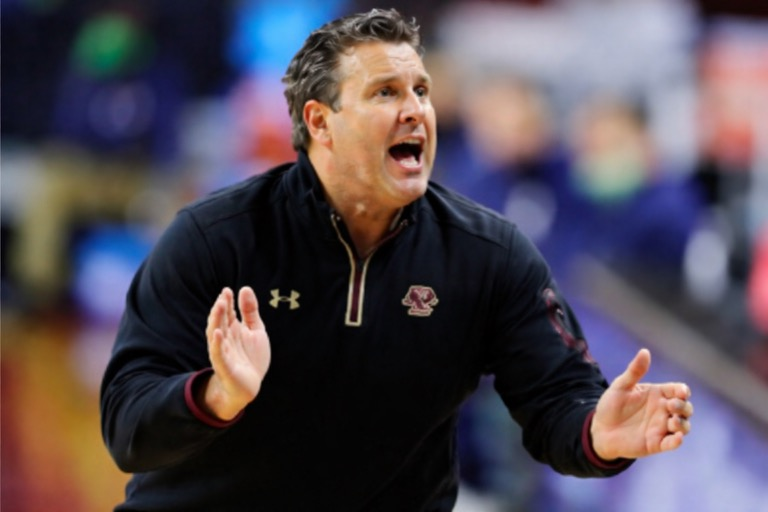
- Coach Scott Spinelli

Biographical details
- Born: Leominster, Massachusetts, U.S.

Playing career
- 1985–1989: Boston University
- Position: Guard

Coaching career (HC unless noted)
- 1990–1993: Milford Academy
- 1993–1996: The Winchendon School
- 1996–1997: Wyoming (assistant)
- 1997–1999: American (assistant)
- 1999–2000: Cincinnati Stuff (assistant)
- 2000–2001: Philadelphia 76ers (scout)
- 2001–2003: Loyola-Chicago (assistant)
- 2003–2006: Nebraska (assistant)
- 2006–2007: Wichita State (assistant)
- 2007–2011: Texas A&M (assistant)
- 2011–2014: Maryland (assistant)
- 2014–2021: Boston College (assistant)
- 2021: Boston College (interim HC)
- 2023–2024: Chicago State (assistant)
- 2024–2025: Chicago State

Head coaching record
- Overall: 5–31 (.139)

Scott Anthony Spinelli is an American college basketball coach who was most recently the head coach of the Chicago State Cougars men's basketball team.

== Playing career ==
Scott Spinelli was born in Leominster, Massachusetts. He is a 1989 graduate of Boston University, where he was a member of the basketball team under coach Mike Jarvis, on a Terriers squad that advanced to the NCAA tournament in 1988.

== Coaching career ==
Spinelli began his coaching career on the prep level in 1990 at Milford Academy, where he spent three seasons as head coach. In 1993, Spinelli started the basketball program at The Winchendon School in Winchendon, Massachusetts. He led them to two appearances in the NEPSAC Class A Tournament championship game. Spinelli also produced numerous Division I players at Winchendon, including former McDonald's All-American Randell Jackson, who played in the NBA with the Washington Wizards and Dallas Mavericks.

In 1996, Spinelli joined the college ranks as an assistant coach at Wyoming for a single season before joining the coaching staff at American from 1997–1999. In 2000, he became a scout for the Philadelphia 76ers, where he spent one season before returning to the college level where he served as an assistant coach at Loyola-Chicago, before joining Barry Collier's staff at Nebraska, where he was part of a pair of NIT berths.

In 2006, Spinelli joined Mark Turgeon's staff at Spinelli then served as an assistant coach at Wichita State for a single season before following Turgeon to Texas A&M. During his four years with the Aggies, the team won 102 games, and earned four-straight NCAA tournament berths. When Turgeon accepted the head coaching position at Maryland, Spinelli once again followed him, joining his staff.

In 2014, Spinelli join the coaching staff at Boston College, under Jim Christian. On staff for six seasons, Spinelli would be named the Interim Head Coach at BC on February 15, 2021, after Christian's firing where he guided the team to a 1–3 record in the Eagles' final four games of the season.

In 2023, Spinelli joined the coaching staff at Chicago State with Gerald Gillion. When Gillion departed for an assistant coaching position at LIU after the season, Spinelli was elevated to head coach of the Cougars. On March 7, 2025, Spinelli was relieved of his duties at Chicago State.

== Head coaching record ==
Record table
Season	Team	Overall	Conference	Standing	Postseason
Boston College Eagles (Atlantic Coast Conference) (2020–2021)
2020–21	Boston College	1–3	1–2		
Boston College:		1–3 (.250)	1–2 (.333)		
Chicago State Cougars (Northeast Conference) (2024–2025)
2024–25	Chicago State	4–28	4–12	T–8th	
Chicago State:		4–28 (.125)	4–12 (.250)		
Total:		5–31 (.139)			
