= 2022–23 Chicago State Cougars men's basketball team =

American college basketball season

2022–23 Chicago State Cougars men's basketball
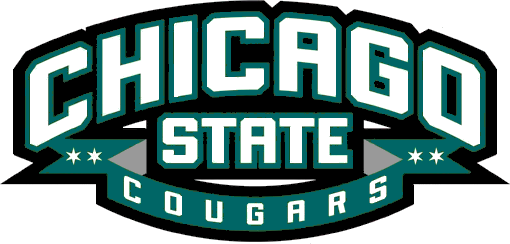
- Conference: Independent
- Record: 11–20
- Head coach: Gerald Gillion (2nd season)
- Associate head coach: Baronton Terry
- Assistant coaches: Tramaine Stevens; Jelani Hewitt
- Home arena: Jones Convocation Center

2022–23 NCAA Division I men's basketball independents standings
	Conf.				Overall
Team	W		L	PCT	W		L	PCT
Chicago State		–		–	11	–	20	.355
Hartford		–		–	5	–	23	.179

The 2022–23 Chicago State Cougars men's basketball team represented Chicago State University in the 2022–23 NCAA Division I men's basketball season. The Cougars, led by second-year head coach Gerald Gillion, played their home games at the Jones Convocation Center in Chicago, Illinois and competed as an independent with no conference affiliation.

== Previous season ==
The Cougars finished the 2021–22 season 7–25, 3–15 in WAC play to finish in a tie for 11th place. As the No. 10 seed in the Western Athletic Conference tournament, they were defeated by Utah Valley in the first round.

The season marked the school's final year as a member of the WAC.

== Roster ==
2022–23 Chicago State Cougars men's basketball team
Players
Coaches

Pos.	#	Name	Height	Weight	Year	Hometown
G	0	Elijah Weaver	6 ft 5 in (1.96 m)	206 lb (93 kg)	Sr	Albany, Georgia
G	1	Wesley Cardet Jr.	6 ft 6 in (1.98 m)	204 lb (93 kg)	So	Fort Lauderdale, Florida
G	2	Deshawn Jean-Charles	6 ft 6 in (1.98 m)	200 lb (91 kg)	Fr	Miami, Florida
G	3	Bryce Johnson	6 ft 3 in (1.91 m)	180 lb (82 kg)	So	Spokane, Washington
G	4	Faheim Meran	6 ft 5 in (1.96 m)	172 lb (78 kg)	Fr	Liberty City, Florida
G	5	Kedrick Green	6 ft 0 in (1.83 m)	200 lb (91 kg)	So	Bronx, New York
G	10	A.J. Neal	6 ft 2 in (1.88 m)	180 lb (82 kg)	So	Orlando, Florida
F	11	Isaiah Hernandez	6 ft 9 in (2.06 m)	220 lb (100 kg)	Fr	Hackensack, New Jersey
G	12	Brent Davis	6 ft 3 in (1.91 m)	190 lb (86 kg)	Jr	Miami, Florida
G	13	Tristan Arneaud	5 ft 10 in (1.78 m)	155 lb (70 kg)	Fr	Pembroke Pines, Florida
G	14	Robert Pierce Blount	6 ft 1 in (1.85 m)	185 lb (84 kg)	So	Tampa, Florida
F	15	Amadou Traore	6 ft 7 in (2.01 m)	250 lb (113 kg)	Jr	Harlem, New York
F	22	Arol Kacuol	6 ft 9 in (2.06 m)	225 lb (102 kg)	Jr	Chueibet, South Sudan
F	23	Tehshaundre Cole	6 ft 5 in (1.96 m)	215 lb (98 kg)	Fr	Toronto, Ontario
G	24	Jahsean Corbett	6 ft 6 in (1.98 m)	210 lb (95 kg)	So	Orlando, Florida
G	25	Charles Fofanah	6 ft 2 in (1.88 m)	185 lb (84 kg)	Fr	Irving, Texas
C	32/20	Taeyon Neal	6 ft 9 in (2.06 m)	315 lb (143 kg)	So	Chicago, Illinois

Head coach

- Gerald Gillion (Florida State)

Assistant coach(es)

- Baronton Terry
- Tramaine Stevens (Morehead State)
- Jelani Hewitt (Georgia Southern)

Legend

- (C) Team captain
- (S) Suspended
- (I) Ineligible
- (W) Walk-on
- Injured
- Current redshirt

Roster
Last update: November 4, 2022

== Schedule and results ==
Date time, TV	Rank^{#}	Opponent^{#}	Result	Record	High points	High rebounds	High assists	Site (attendance) city, state
Regular season
November 7, 2022*; 7:00 pm, BTN+		at Northwestern	L 54–85	0–1	19 – Weaver	8 – Corbett	2 – 2 Tied	Welsh–Ryan Arena (2,676); Evanston, IL
November 11, 2022*; 7:00 pm		at St. Thomas	L 61–83	0–2	18 – Cardet Jr.	11 – Corbett	5 – Weaver	Schoenecker Arena (1,378); St. Paul, MN
November 14, 2022*; 7:00 pm		IUPUI	W 68–58	1–2	15 – Weaver	8 – Kacuol	5 – Cardet Jr.	Jones Convocation Center (219); Chicago, IL
November 16, 2022*; 7:00 pm		Valparaiso	W 87–74	2–2	24 – Cardet Jr.	8 – Corbett	2 – Davis	Jones Convocation Center (155); Chicago, IL
November 19, 2022*; 1:00 pm, ESPN+		at Kent State	L 59–88	2–3	17 – Cardet Jr.	12 – Corbett	4 – Cardet Jr.	MAC Center (811); Kent, OH
November 21, 2022*; 6:00 pm, ESPN+		at Marshall	L 70–82	2–4	18 – Johnson	8 – Corbett	6 – Cardet Jr.	Cam Henderson Center (3,573); Huntington, WV
November 23, 2022*; 12:00 pm, ESPN+		at Cleveland State; CSU Home MTE	L 63–77	2–5	19 – Weaver	11 – Corbett	5 – Cardet Jr.	Wolstein Center (1,500); Cleveland, OH
November 26, 2022*; 7:30 pm, FS2		at Marquette	L 68–82	2–6	18 – Cardet Jr.	12 – Corbett	4 – 3 Tied	Fiserv Forum (12,812); Milwaukee, WI
December 1, 2022*; 7:00 pm		at Bethune–Cookman	L 73–86	2–7	27 – Cardet Jr.	11 – Corbett	5 – Green	Moore Gymnasium (631); Daytona Beach, FL
December 4, 2022*; 2:00 pm		Southern Indiana	W 78–61	3–7	18 – Davis	8 – Weaver	5 – Weaver	Jones Convocation Center; Chicago, IL
December 11, 2022*; 1:00 pm, ESPN+		at UT Martin	L 74–75 ^{OT}	3–8	25 – Cardet Jr.	10 – Corbett	4 – 2 Tied	Skyhawk Arena (1,099); Martin, TN
December 13, 2022*; 6:00 pm, ESPN+		at Murray State	L 65–66	3–9	25 – Corbett	8 – Weaver	2 – 4 Tied	CFSB Center (3,823); Murray, KY
December 16, 2022*; 7:00 pm, ESPN+		at Southern Illinois	L 52–63	3–10	14 – Cardet Jr.	6 – Corbett	3 – Weaver	Banterra Center (3,924); Carbondale, IL
December 19, 2022*; 7:00 pm, ESPN+		at Illinois State	L 52–66	3–11	14 – Corbett	9 – Jean-Charles	5 – Cardet Jr.	CEFCU Arena (2,964); Normal, IL
December 22, 2022*; 12:00 pm, BTN+		at Minnesota	L 55–58	3–12	17 – Cardet Jr.	10 – Corbett	5 – Weaver	Williams Arena (8,736); Minneapolis, MN
December 28, 2022*; 6:00 pm, ESPN+		at Ball State	L 63–70	3–13	18 – Cardet Jr.	10 – Corbett	3 – Weaver	Worthen Arena (3,540); Muncie, IN
December 30, 2022*; 6:00 pm, ESPN3		at Ohio	L 59–76	3–14	13 – Cardet Jr.	14 – Corbett	3 – 2 Tied	Convocation Center (3,003); Athens, OH
January 9, 2023*; 7:00 pm		East–West	W 90–70	4–14	24 – Cardet Jr.	13 – Corbett	5 – Cardet Jr.	Jones Convocation Center; Chicago, IL
January 11, 2023*; 7:00 pm, ESPN+		at Tarleton State	L 63–73	4–15	21 – Johnson	15 – Corbett	2 – 4 Tied	Wisdom Gym (1,487); Stephenville, TX
January 14, 2023*; 6:30 pm, ESPN+		at Texas–Rio Grande Valley	L 82–85	4–16	26 – Weaver	8 – Corbett	9 – Weaver	UTRGV Fieldhouse (1,121); Edinburg, TX
January 23, 2023*; 6:00 pm, ESPN+		at Coastal Carolina	W 74–70	5–16	21 – Cardet Jr.	7 – 2 Tied	5 – Weaver	HTC Center (1,321); Conway, SC
January 25, 2023*; 9:00 pm, P12N		at Stanford	L 65–72	5–17	31 – Cardet Jr.	8 – Corbett	2 – Corbett	Maples Pavilion (2,406); Stanford, CA
January 28, 2023*; 2:00 pm		Aurora	W 101–66	6–17	29 – Johnson	9 – Davis	6 – Cardet Jr.	Jones Convocation Center; Chicago, IL
January 30, 2023*; 7:00 pm, ESPN+		at The Citadel	W 76–75	7–17	21 – Cardet Jr.	13 – Corbett	5 – Weaver	McAlister Field House (735); Charleston, SC
February 4, 2023*; 1:00 pm		at Hartford	W 62–49	8–17	13 – Cardet Jr.	11 – Corbett	5 – Green	Chase Arena (389); West Hartford, CT
February 7, 2023*; 6:00 pm		at Delaware State	L 60–66	8–18	18 – Corbett	10 – Corbett	4 – 2 Tied	Memorial Hall (975); Dover, DE
February 11, 2023*; 2:00 pm		Saint Xavier	W 91–67	9–18	25 – Weaver	9 – Corbett	7 – Green	Jones Convocation Center (141); Chicago, IL
February 17, 2023*; 7:00 pm		Calumet College	W 103–56	10–18	24 – Cardet Jr.	8 – Corbett	7 – Cardet Jr.	Jones Convocation Center; Chicago, IL
February 19, 2023*; 2:00 pm		Hartford	W 75–53	11–18	23 – Corbett	7 – Corbett	9 – Weaver	Jones Convocation Center; Chicago, IL
March 1, 2023*; 8:00 pm		at No. 10 Gonzaga	L 65–104	11–19	22 – Corbett	7 – Corbett	3 – Green	McCarthey Athletic Center (6,000); Spokane, WA
March 4, 2023*; 6:00 pm		at Fresno State	L 72–108	11–20	22 – Weaver	8 – Corbett	4 – Weaver	Save Mart Center (5,145); Fresno, CA
*Non-conference game. ^{#}Rankings from AP Poll. (#) Tournament seedings in parentheses. All times are in Central.
