= Gerald Gillion =

American basketball coach (born 1985)

Current position
- Title: Assistant coach
- Team: Florida State
- Conference: Atlantic Coast Conference

Biographical details
- Born: October 10, 1985 (age 41)
- Education: Florida State ('08)

Coaching career (HC unless noted)
- 2008–2013: Northeast HS
- 2014–2017: South Florida (assistant)
- 2017–2019: Tennessee Tech (assistant)
- 2020–2021: Samford (assistant)
- 2021–2024: Chicago State
- 2024–2025: LIU (AHC)
- 2025-present: Florida State (assistant)

Administrative career (AD unless noted)
- 2013–2014: FIU (DBO)

Head coaching record
- Overall: 31–64 (.326)
- Tournaments: 1–1 (CBI)

Gerald Gillion (born October 10, 1985) is an American men's basketball coach. He is currently an assistant coach of Florida State.

Gillion attended Florida State University. He graduated with a degree in social science in 2008.

Gillion began his coaching career when he was named head coach of Northeast High School in Oakland Park, Florida in 2008. In his first season, he led the team to 20 wins and a district title, despite winning 10 games the season before. In 2013, Gillion was hired as the director of basketball operations at FIU. He joined the staff of Orlando Antigua as a special assistant to the head coach at South Florida in 2014. He joined the staff at Tennessee Tech in 2017, and helped the team achieve a 19–12 record in his first season. Gillion took a break from coaching during the 2019–20 academic year and taught at Northeast High School. During the 2020–21 season, he was an assistant coach at Samford.

Gillion was hired as head coach of Chicago State on July 19, 2021. CSU Director of Intercollegiate Athletics Elliott Charles called Gillion "a tremendously talented recruiter and mentor to students."

His brother Kenny is the head coach at West Oaks Academy.

== Head coaching record ==
Record table
Season	Team	Overall	Conference	Standing	Postseason
Chicago State Cougars (WAC) (2021–2022)
2021–22	Chicago State	7–25	3–15	T–11th	
Chicago State Cougars (Independent) (2022–2024)
2022–23	Chicago State	11–20			
2023–24	Chicago State	13–19			CBI Quarterfinals
Chicago State:		31–64 (.326)	3–15 (.167)		
Total:		31–64 (.326)			
