= 2024–25 America East Conference men's basketball season =

College basketball season

2024–25 America East men's basketball season
- League: NCAA Division I
- Sport: Men's basketball
- Teams: 9

Regular season
- Season champions: Bryant
- Season MVP: Earl Timberlake, Bryant

Tournament
- Champions: Bryant

Basketball seasons
- ← 2023–24 2025–26 →

2024–25 America East Conference men's basketball standings
	Conf.				Overall
Team	W		L	PCT	W		L	PCT
Bryant †	14	–	2	.875	23	–	12	.657
Vermont	13	–	3	.813	21	–	12	.636
Maine	10	–	6	.625	20	–	14	.588
Albany	8	–	8	.500	17	–	16	.515
Binghamton	7	–	9	.438	15	–	17	.469
UMass Lowell	6	–	10	.375	17	–	15	.531
New Hampshire	6	–	10	.375	8	–	24	.250
UMBC	5	–	11	.313	13	–	19	.406
NJIT	3	–	13	.188	6	–	25	.194
† 2025 AmEast tournament winner

The 2024–25 America East men's basketball season began with practices in September 2024 and will end with the 2025 America East men's basketball tournament in March 2025. This is the 45th year of competition in men's basketball for the America East Conference.

== Head coaches ==
Team	Head coach	Previous job	Season	Overall record	America East record	NCAA Tournaments
Albany	Dwayne Killings	Marquette (asst.)	4th	45–72 (.385)	20–38 (.345)	0
Binghamton	Levell Sanders	Binghamton (asst.)	4th	52–63 (.452)	27–33 (.450)	0
Bryant	Phil Martelli, Jr.	Bryant (asst.)	2nd	35–23 (.603)	20–6 (.769)	0
Maine	Chris Markwood	Boston College (asst.)	3rd	44–43 (.506)	22–20 (.524)	0
UMBC	Jim Ferry	Penn State	4th	58–63 (.479)	28–32 (.467)	0
UMass Lowell	Pat Duquette	Northeastern (asst.)	12th	173–182 (.487)	93–103 (.474)	0
New Hampshire	Nathan Davis	Bucknell	2nd	22–34 (.393)	11–15 (.423)	0
NJIT	Grant Billmeier	Maryland (asst.)	2nd	12–41 (.226)	5–21 (.192)	0
Vermont	John Becker	Vermont (asst.)	14th	321–131 (.710)	186–34 (.845)	6

Notes:

- Season and record numbers include 2024–25 season.

== Preseason ==
=== Preseason coaches poll ===
2024–25 America East Preseason Coaches Poll
Rank	Team (First place votes)	Points
1	Vermont (8)	64
2	UMass Lowell (1)	55
3	Bryant	52
4	Maine	39
5	UMBC	31
6	Binghamton	30
7	UAlbany	26
8	NJIT	15
9	New Hampshire	12

=== Preseason All-Conference Team ===
First team
Marcus Banks, UMBC
Shamir Bogues, Vermont
Max Brooks, UMass Lowell
TJ Long, Vermont
Earl Timberlake, Bryant

== Regular season ==
=== Player of the Week awards ===
Week	Player of the Week	Rookie of the Week
1	Quinton Mincey, UMass Lowell	Martin Somerville, UMass Lowell
2	Justin Neely, UAlbany	Amir Lindsey, UAlbany
3	Quinton Mincey (2), UMass Lowell	Martin Somerville (2), UMass Lowell
4	Kellen Tynes, Maine	Martin Somerville (3), UMass Lowell
5	Chris Walker, Binghamton	Martin Somerville (4), UMass Lowell
6	Max Brooks, UMass Lowell	Martin Somerville (5), UMass Lowell
7	Max Brooks (2), UMass Lowell	Martin Somerville (6), UMass Lowell
8	Marcus Banks, UMBC	Martin Somerville (7), UMass Lowell
9	Gavin Walsh, Binghamton	Quentin Duncan, NJIT
10	Kellen Tynes (2), Maine	Ari Fulton, NJIT
11	Earl Timberlake, Bryant	Khalil Badru, New Hampshire
12	Quion Burns, Maine	Martin Somerville (8), UMass Lowell
13	Gavin Walsh (2), Binghamton	Martin Somerville (9), UMass Lowell
14	AJ Lopez, Maine	Khalil Badru (2), New Hampshire
15	Earl Timberlake (2), Bryant	Khalil Badru (3), New Hampshire
16	T.J. Hurley. Vermont	Quentin Duncan (2), NJIT Martin Somerville (10), UMass Lowell
17	Earl Timberlake (3), Bryant	Martin Somerville (11), UMass Lowell

School	POTW	ROTW
Albany	1	1
Binghamton	3	0
Bryant	3	0
Maine	4	0
UMBC	1	0
UMass Lowell	4	11
New Hampshire	0	3
NJIT	0	3
Vermont	1	0

== Postseason ==
=== America East tournament ===
The conference tournament was played from March 8 to March 15, 2025. All tournament games were hosted at the higher seed's campus site. Teams were reseeded after quarterfinals.

=== NCAA Tournament ===
As the conference champion, Bryant received an automatic bid to the 2025 NCAA Division I men's basketball tournament.

Seed	Region	School	First Four	First round	Second round	Sweet Sixteen	Elite Eight	Final Four	Championship
15	South	Bryant	—N/a	vs. (2) Michigan State - (Cleveland)	―	―	―	―	―

== Conference awards ==
2025 America East Men's Basketball Individual Awards
Award	Recipient(s)
Player of the Year	Earl Timberlake, Bryant
Coach of the Year	Phil Martelli Jr., Bryant
Defensive Player of the Year	Kellen Tynes, Maine
Sixth Man of the Year	Justin Neely, Albany
Rookie of the Year	Martin Somerville, UMass Lowell
Newcomer of the Year	Barry Evans, Bryant

2025 America East Men's Basketball All-Conference Teams
First Team	Second Team	Third Team	Defensive Team	Rookie Team
Shamir Bogues, Vermont; Max Brooks, UMass Lowell; TJ Hurley, Vermont; Rafael Pinzon, Bryant; Earl Timberlake, Bryant	Tymu Chenery, Binghamton; Barry Evans, Bryant; AJ Lopez, Maine; Quinton Mincey, UMass Lowell; Kellen Tynes, Maine	Ileri Ayo-Faleye, Vermont; Nick Fiorillo, Vermont; Byron Joshua, Albany; Sami Pissis, New Hampshire; Gavin Walsh, Binghamton	Ileri Ayo-Faleye, Vermont; Shamir Bogues, Vermont; Max Brooks, UMass Lowell; Earl Timberlake, Bryant; Kellen Tynes, Maine	Khalil Badru, New Hampshire; Sean Blake, Vermont; Ari Fulton, NJIT; Amir Lindsey, Albany; Martin Somerville, UMass Lowell
