= 2024–25 Maine Black Bears men's basketball team =

American college basketball season

2024–25 Maine Black Bears men's basketball
- Conference: America East Conference
- Record: 20–14 (10–6 America East)
- Head coach: Chris Markwood (3rd season)
- Assistant coaches: Rob O'Driscoll; Pete Gash; Jordon Bronner
- Home arena: Memorial Gymnasium

2024–25 America East Conference men's basketball standings
	Conf.				Overall
Team	W		L	PCT	W		L	PCT
Bryant †	14	–	2	.875	23	–	12	.657
Vermont	13	–	3	.813	21	–	12	.636
Maine	10	–	6	.625	20	–	14	.588
Albany	8	–	8	.500	17	–	16	.515
Binghamton	7	–	9	.438	15	–	17	.469
UMass Lowell	6	–	10	.375	17	–	15	.531
New Hampshire	6	–	10	.375	8	–	24	.250
UMBC	5	–	11	.313	13	–	19	.406
NJIT	3	–	13	.188	6	–	25	.194
† 2025 AmEast tournament winner

The 2024–25 Maine Black Bears men's basketball team represented the University of Maine during the 2024–25 NCAA Division I men's basketball season. The Black Bears, led by third-year head coach Chris Markwood, play their home games at Memorial Gymnasium in Orono, Maine, as members of the America East Conference.

== Previous season ==
The Black Bears finished the 2023–24 season 15–17, 7–9 in America East play, to finish in a three-way tie for fourth place. They were defeated by Bryant in the quarterfinals of the America East tournament.

== Roster ==
2024–25 Maine Black Bears men's basketball team
Players
Coaches

Pos.	#	Name	Height	Weight	Year	Previous school	Hometown
G	0	Logan Carey	6 ft 3 in (1.91 m)	—	So	St. Paul's School	Shelton, CT
G	1	Kellen Tynes (C)	6 ft 3 in (1.91 m)	175 lb (79 kg)	GS	Montana State	Dartmouth, NS
F	2	Christopher Mantis	6 ft 7 in (2.01 m)	185 lb (84 kg)	Sr	Appalachian State	Lowell, IN
G	3	Jaden Clayton (C)	6 ft 1 in (1.85 m)	—	Jr	Fort Erie International Academy	Whitby, ON
G	4	Caleb Crawford	5 ft 10 in (1.78 m)	—	Fr	Loomis Chaffee School	The Bronx, NY
G	5	Isaac Bonilla	6 ft 0 in (1.83 m)	—	So	Bradford Christian Academy	Danville, NH
G	8	Darius Lopes	6 ft 2 in (1.88 m)	—	Fr	Vermont Academy	West Warwick, RI
F	10	Killian Gribben	6 ft 10 in (2.08 m)	215 lb (98 kg)	Jr	Siena	Letterkenny, Ireland
F	11	Ridvan Tutic	6 ft 10 in (2.08 m)	242 lb (110 kg)	Jr	New Hampshire	Novi Pazar, Serbia
F	12	Milos Nenadic	6 ft 10 in (2.08 m)	—	Sr	Western Reserve Academy	Kitchener, ON
F	13	Amare Allen	6 ft 7 in (2.01 m)	—	Fr	CODE Academy	Ajax, ON
G	14	AJ Lopez	6 ft 5 in (1.96 m)	170 lb (77 kg)	Sr	New Hampshire	Queens, NY
F	15	John Shea	6 ft 6 in (1.98 m)	—	Jr	Edward Little High School	Auburn, ME
G	22	Quion Burns	6 ft 6 in (1.98 m)	180 lb (82 kg)	Sr	LIU	White Plains, NY
F	25	Keelan Steele	6 ft 10 in (2.08 m)	—	Jr	Victory Academy	Alton, ON
F	31	Novak Perovic	6 ft 7 in (2.01 m)	—	Sr	Hoosac School	Belgrade, Serbia

Head coach

- Chris Markwood (Maine)

Assistant coach(es)

- Rob O'Driscoll (Villanova)
- Pete Gash (Chattanooga)
- Jordon Bronner (New Hampshire)

Legend

- (C) Team captain
- (S) Suspended
- (I) Ineligible
- (W) Walk-on
- Injured
- Current redshirt

Roster
Last update: October 7, 2024

== Schedule and results ==
Date time, TV	Rank^{#}	Opponent^{#}	Result	Record	Site (attendance) city, state
Non-conference regular season
November 4, 2024*; 7:00 p.m., ACCN		at No. 7 Duke	L 62–96	0–1	Cameron Indoor Stadium (9,314); Durham, NC
November 6, 2024*; 6:00 p.m., ESPN+		UMaine Fort Kent	W 98–47	1–1	Memorial Gymnasium (569); Orono, ME
November 10, 2024*; 2:00 p.m., ESPN+		at Brown	W 69–67	2–1	Pizzitola Sports Center (751); Providence, RI
November 15, 2024*; 7:00 p.m., ESPN+		at Quinnipiac	L 55–58	2–2	M&T Bank Arena (1,912); Hamden, CT
November 20, 2024*; 7:00 p.m., ESPN+		at Richmond	L 66–70	2–3	Robins Center (4,633); Richmond, VA
November 24, 2024*; 12:00 p.m., ESPN+		Holy Cross	W 80–55	3–3	Memorial Gymnasium (1,268); Orono, ME
November 29, 2024*; 2:00 p.m., ESPN+		vs. Elon; Cathedral Classic Invitational	W 69–56	4–3	The Palestra; Philadelphia, PA
November 30, 2024*; 4:30 p.m., ESPN+		at Penn; Cathedral Classic Invitational	L 64–77	4–4	The Palestra (931); Philadelphia, PA
December 1, 2024*; 12:00 p.m., ESPN+		vs. Navy; Cathedral Classic Invitational	W 71–66	5–4	The Palestra; Philadelphia, PA
December 3, 2024*; 6:00 p.m., ESPN+		UMaine Augusta	W 103–51	6–4	Memorial Gymnasium (458); Orono, ME
December 8, 2024*; 12:00 p.m., ESPN+		at Fordham	L 72–87	6–5	Rose Hill Gymnasium (1,679); The Bronx, NY
December 11, 2024*; 7:00 p.m., ESPN+		at Duquesne	W 61–56	7–5	UPMC Cooper Fieldhouse (2,076); Pittsburgh, PA
December 14, 2024*; 1:00 p.m., ESPN+		at Canisius	W 84–79	8–5	Koessler Athletic Center (830); Buffalo, NY
December 21, 2024*; 2:00 p.m., FloHoops		at Stony Brook	L 72–74	8–6	Island Federal Arena (2,081); Stony Brook, NY
December 29, 2024*; 2:00 p.m., ESPN+		Boston University	L 56–59	8–7	Memorial Gymnasium (1,221); Orono, ME
America East regular season
January 4, 2025; 2:00 p.m., ESPN+		at Bryant	L 55–81	8–8 (0–1)	Chace Athletic Center (795); Smithfield, RI
January 9, 2025; 6:00 p.m., ESPN+		Binghamton	W 82–71	9–8 (1–1)	Memorial Gymnasium (508); Orono, ME
January 11, 2025; 2:00 p.m., ESPN+		Albany	W 87–66	10–8 (2–1)	Memorial Gymnasium (1,064); Orono, ME
January 16, 2025; 11:00 a.m., ESPN+		at NJIT	W 57–44	11–8 (3–1)	Wellness and Events Center (1,672); Newark, NJ
January 18, 2025; 1:00 p.m., ESPN+		at UMBC	W 87–62	12–8 (4–1)	Chesapeake Employers Insurance Arena (1,425); Catonsville, MD
January 23, 2025; 6:00 p.m., ESPN+		at UMass Lowell	W 86–85 ^{OT}	13–8 (5–1)	Costello Athletic Center (532); Lowell, MA
January 30, 2025; 6:00 p.m., ESPN+		New Hampshire	W 71–46	14–8 (6–1)	Memorial Gymnasium (1,076); Orono, ME
February 1, 2025; 2:00 p.m., ESPN+		at Vermont	L 49–55	14–9 (6–2)	Patrick Gym (2,760); Burlington, VT
February 6, 2025; 6:00 p.m., ESPN+		NJIT	W 78–74	15–9 (7–2)	Memorial Gymnasium (717); Orono, ME
February 8, 2025; 2:00 p.m., ESPN+		UMBC	W 73–50	16–9 (8–2)	Memorial Gymnasium (1,002); Orono, ME
February 15, 2025; 2:00 p.m., ESPN+		Vermont	L 61–65	16–10 (8–3)	Memorial Gymnasium (1,290); Orono, ME
February 20, 2025; 6:30 p.m., ESPN+		at Albany	L 68–79	16–11 (8–4)	Broadview Center (2,150); Albany, NY
February 22, 2025; 2:00 p.m., ESPN+		at Binghamton	L 69–71	16–12 (8–5)	Dr. Bai Lee Court (2,394); Vestal, NY
February 27, 2025; 7:00 p.m., ESPN+		at New Hampshire	W 73–66	17–12 (9–5)	Lundholm Gym (783); Durham, NH
March 1, 2025; 2:00 p.m., ESPN+		Bryant	L 72–80	17–13 (9–6)	Memorial Gymnasium (1,129); Orono, ME
March 4, 2025; 6:00 p.m., ESPN+		UMass Lowell	W 71–70	18–13 (10–6)	Memorial Gymnasium (658); Orono, ME
America East tournament
March 8, 2025; 6:00 p.m., ESPN+	(3)	(6) UMass Lowell; Quarterfinals	W 72–64	19–13	Memorial Gymnasium (1,282); Orono, ME
March 11, 2025; 7:00 p.m., ESPN+	(3)	at (2) Vermont; Semifinals	W 57–42	20–13	Patrick Gym (2,071); Burlington, VT
March 15, 2025; 11:00 a.m., ESPN2	(3)	at (1) Bryant; Championship	L 59–77	20–14	Chace Athletic Center (1,538); Smithfield, RI
*Non-conference game. ^{#}Rankings from AP poll. (#) Tournament seedings in parentheses. All times are in Eastern.
