= 2024–25 UMass Lowell River Hawks men's basketball team =

American college basketball season

2024–25 UMass Lowell River Hawks men's basketball
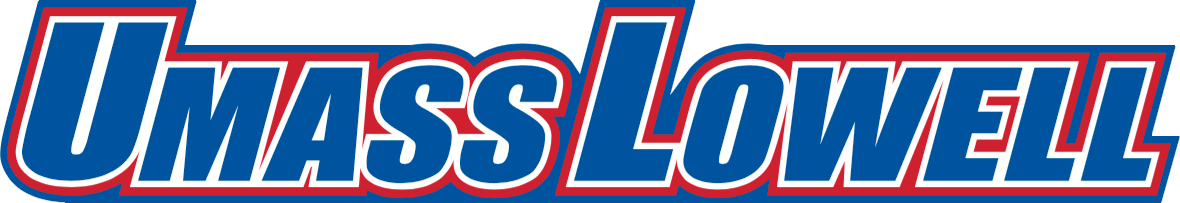
- Conference: America East Conference
- Record: 17–15 (6–10 America East)
- Head coach: Pat Duquette (12th season)
- Associate head coach: Jon Iati
- Assistant coaches: Matt Graves; Bryan Dougher
- Home arena: Costello Athletic Center

2024–25 America East Conference men's basketball standings
	Conf.				Overall
Team	W		L	PCT	W		L	PCT
Bryant †	14	–	2	.875	23	–	12	.657
Vermont	13	–	3	.813	21	–	12	.636
Maine	10	–	6	.625	20	–	14	.588
Albany	8	–	8	.500	17	–	16	.515
Binghamton	7	–	9	.438	15	–	17	.469
UMass Lowell	6	–	10	.375	17	–	15	.531
New Hampshire	6	–	10	.375	8	–	24	.250
UMBC	5	–	11	.313	13	–	19	.406
NJIT	3	–	13	.188	6	–	25	.194
† 2025 AmEast tournament winner

The 2024–25 UMass Lowell River Hawks men's basketball team represented the University of Massachusetts Lowell during the 2024–25 NCAA Division I men's basketball season. The River Hawks, led by 12th-year head coach Pat Duquette, played their home games at the Costello Athletic Center located in Lowell, Massachusetts as members of the America East Conference. They finished the season 17–15, 6–10 in America East play to finish in a tie for sixth place. As the No. 6 seed in the America East tournament, they lost to Maine in the quarterfinals.

== Previous season ==
The River Hawks finished the 2023–24 season with a 22–10, including an 11–5 mark in America East play to finish in a tie for second place. They defeated UMBC and Bryant, before falling to top-seeded Vermont in the America East tournament championship game.

== Roster ==
2024–25 UMass Lowell River Hawks men's basketball team
Players
Coaches

Pos.	#	Name	Height	Weight	Year	Previous school	Hometown
G	0	Mekhi Gray	6 ft 4 in (1.93 m)	190 lb (86 kg)	GS	NJIT	Montrose, New York
G	1	Kris Johnson	6 ft 5 in (1.96 m)	190 lb (86 kg)	Fr	Clinton Grace Christian School	Prince George's County, Maryland
F	2	Keenan Bey	6 ft 7 in (2.01 m)	198 lb (90 kg)	RS Fr	Bishop Gorman High School	Las Vegas, Nevada
G	3	Quinton Mincey	6 ft 6 in (1.98 m)	205 lb (93 kg)	GS	Mount St. Mary's	Upper Marlboro, Maryland
G	4	Yuri Covington (5Y)	6 ft 1 in (1.85 m)	192 lb (87 kg)	Sr	William & Mary	Wilkes-Barre, Pennsylvania
G	5	Martin Somerville	6 ft 3 in (1.91 m)	184 lb (83 kg)	Fr	Southern California Academy	Bowie, Maryland
G	6	Isaiah Walter	6 ft 6 in (1.98 m)	200 lb (91 kg)	Fr	Tuggerah Lakes Secondary	Central Coast, Australia
F	10	Max Brooks (5Y)	6 ft 7 in (2.01 m)	205 lb (93 kg)	Sr	St. Charles High School	Waldorf, Maryland
G	11	Quincy Clark	6 ft 4 in (1.93 m)	190 lb (86 kg)	Sr	Jacksonville State	Columbus, Ohio
G	12	Caleb Murphy (5Y)	6 ft 4 in (1.93 m)	190 lb (86 kg)	Sr	DePaul	Atlanta, Georgia
G	14	Anthony Blunt	6 ft 3 in (1.91 m)	185 lb (84 kg)	GS	St. Vincent Pallotti High School	Glenn Dale, Maryland
G	22	Armani Perkins	6 ft 1 in (1.85 m)	180 lb (82 kg)	Fr	Holbrook High School	Brockton, Massachusetts
F	23	Cam Morris III	6 ft 8 in (2.03 m)	205 lb (93 kg)	Sr	IMG Academy	Alexander City, Alabama
F	24	Xzavier Lino	6 ft 6 in (1.98 m)	200 lb (91 kg)	Sr	Whitman College	Phoenix, Arizona
F	33	Ephraim Acquah	6 ft 7 in (2.01 m)	192 lb (87 kg)	Sr	Williamsport High School	Hagerstown, Maryland

Head coach

- Pat Duquette (Williams)

Assistant coach(es)

- Jon Iati (Albany)
- Matt Graves (Belmont Abbey)
- Bryan Dougher (Stony Brook)

Legend

- (C) Team captain
- (S) Suspended
- (I) Ineligible
- (W) Walk-on
- (5Y) Fifth-year senior
- Injured
- Current redshirt

Roster
Last update: October 8, 2024

== Schedule and results ==
Date time, TV	Rank^{#}	Opponent^{#}	Result	Record	Site (attendance) city, state
Non-conference regular season
November 4, 2024*; 6:00 pm, ESPN+		Rivier	W 115–59	1–0	Costello Athletic Center (564); Lowell, MA
November 8, 2024*; 6:00 pm, ESPN+		Saint Peter's	W 81–74	2–0	Costello Athletic Center (601); Lowell, MA
November 15, 2024*; 9:00 p.m., ESPN+		at No. 4 Gonzaga	L 54–113	2–1	McCarthey Athletic Center (6,000); Spokane, WA
November 17, 2024*; 10:30 pm, B1G+		at Washington	L 69–74	2–2	Alaska Airlines Arena (5,378); Seattle, WA
November 20, 2024*; 3:00 pm, ESPN+		Fisher	W 121–66	3–2	Costello Athletic Center (246); Lowell, MA
November 23, 2024*; 1:00 pm, ESPN+		Quinnipiac; 314 Classic	W 80–70	4–2	Costello Athletic Center (504); Lowell, MA
November 25, 2024*; 6:00 pm, ESPN+		Merrimack	W 81–74	5–2	Costello Athletic Center (578); Lowell, MA
November 27, 2024*; 8:00 pm, ESPN+		at Saint Louis; 314 Classic	L 90–93	5–3	Chaifetz Arena (4,925); St. Louis, MO
December 1, 2024*; 1:00 pm, NEC Front Row		at Central Connecticut	L 67–69	5–3	William H. Detrick Gymnasium (871); New Britain, CT
December 7, 2024*; 12:00 pm, NESN+/ESPN+		at UMass	W 96–83	6–4	Mullins Center (2,357); Amherst, MA
December 11, 2024*; 6:00 pm, ESPN+		LIU	W 69–62	7–4	Costello Athletic Center (427); Lowell, MA
December 14, 2024*; 2:00 pm, ESPN+		Dartmouth	W 92–83	8–4	Costello Athletic Center (511); Lowell, MA
December 18, 2024*; 6:00 pm, ESPN+		Stonehill	W 78–67	9–4	Costello Athletic Center (395); Lowell, MA
December 21, 2024*; 2:00 pm, ESPN+		Boston University	W 83–71	10–4	Costello Athletic Center (532); Lowell, MA
December 30, 2024*; 2:00 pm, ESPN+		Emerson	W 101–39	11–4	Costello Athletic Center (441); Lowell, MA
America East regular season
January 4, 2025; 4:00 pm, ESPN+		at Albany	W 73–69	12–4 (1–0)	Broadview Center (2,025); Albany, NY
January 9, 2025; 6:00 pm, ESPN+		Vermont	L 63–67	12–5 (1–1)	Costello Athletic Center (957); Lowell, MA
January 11, 2025; 1:00 pm, ESPN+		NJIT	W 70–62	13–5 (2–1)	Costello Athletic Center (535); Lowell, MA
January 18, 2025; 4:00 pm, ESPN+		at Bryant	L 62–85	13–6 (2–2)	Chace Athletic Center (734); Smithfield, RI
January 23, 2025; 6:00 pm, ESPN+		Maine	L 85–86 ^{OT}	13–7 (2–3)	Costello Athletic Center (532); Lowell, MA
January 25, 2025; 2:00 pm, ESPN+		New Hampshire	W 97–80	14–7 (3–3)	Costello Athletic Center (845); Lowell, MA
January 30, 2025; 7:00 pm, ESPN+		at NJIT	L 62–83	14–8 (3–4)	Wellness and Events Center (576); Newark, NJ
February 1, 2025; 1:00 pm, ESPN+		at UMBC	W 83–67	15–8 (4–4)	Chesapeake Employers Insurance Arena (1,856); Catonsville, MD
February 6, 2025; 6:07 pm, ESPN+		at Binghamton	L 54–66	15–9 (4–5)	Dr. Bai Lee Court (2,163); Vestal, NY
February 13, 2025; 6:00 pm, ESPN+		Albany	L 88–90 ^{OT}	15–10 (4–6)	Costello Athletic Center (515); Lowell, MA
February 15, 2025; 1:00 pm, ESPN+		at New Hampshire	L 79–80	15–11 (4–7)	Lundholm Gym (545); Durham, NH
February 20, 2025; 6:00 pm, ESPN+		UMBC	W 98–79	16–11 (5–7)	Costello Athletic Center (691); Lowell, MA
February 22, 2025; 4:30 pm, ESPN+		at Vermont	L 61–85	16–12 (5–8)	Patrick Gym (2,819); Burlington, VT
February 27, 2025; 6:00 pm, ESPN+		Bryant	L 78–79	16–13 (5–9)	Costello Athletic Center (508); Lowell, MA
March 1, 2025; 1:00 pm, ESPN+		Binghamton	W 79–53	17–13 (6–9)	Costello Athletic Center (755); Lowell, MA
March 4, 2025; 6:00 pm, ESPN+		at Maine	L 70–71	17–14 (6–10)	Memorial Gymnasium (658); Orono, ME
America East tournament
March 8, 2025; 6:00 pm, ESPN+	(6)	at (3) Maine; Quarterfinals	L 64–72	17–15	Memorial Gymnasium (1,282); Orono, ME
*Non-conference game. ^{#}Rankings from AP Poll. (#) Tournament seedings in parentheses. All times are in Eastern.
