= 2024–25 Bryant Bulldogs men's basketball team =

American college basketball season

2024–25 Bryant Bulldogs men's basketball
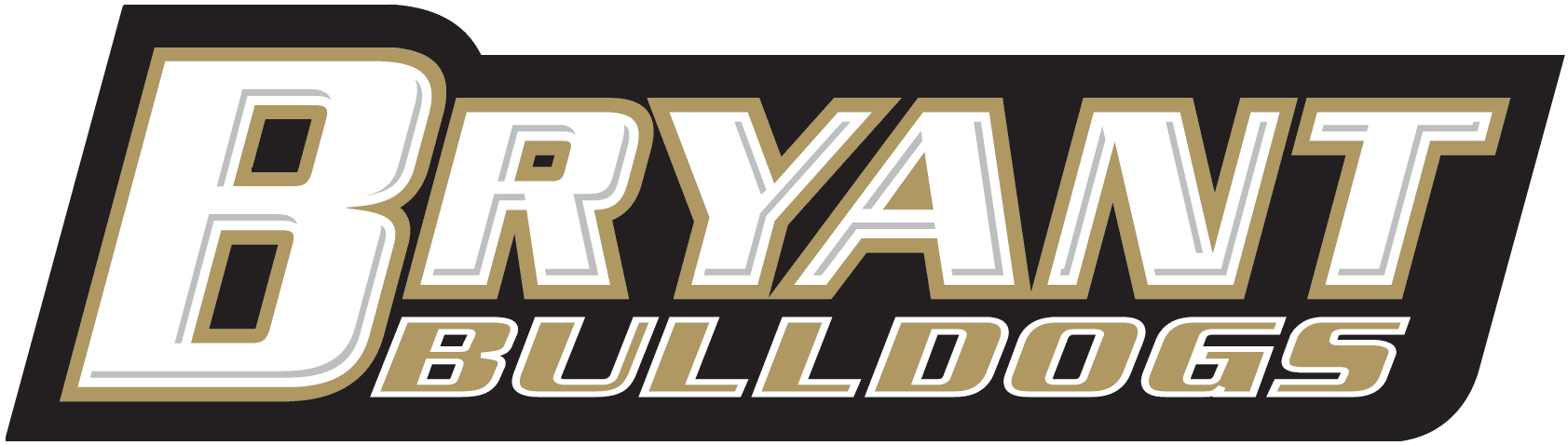

America East regular season & tournament champions

NCAA tournament, First Round
- Conference: America East Conference
- Record: 23–12 (14–2 America East)
- Head coach: Phil Martelli Jr. (2nd season)
- Associate head coach: Chris Cole
- Assistant coaches: Brendan Phelps; Ryan Daly; Nick Schmidt
- Home arena: Chace Athletic Center

2024–25 America East Conference men's basketball standings
	Conf.				Overall
Team	W		L	PCT	W		L	PCT
Bryant †	14	–	2	.875	23	–	12	.657
Vermont	13	–	3	.813	21	–	12	.636
Maine	10	–	6	.625	20	–	14	.588
Albany	8	–	8	.500	17	–	16	.515
Binghamton	7	–	9	.438	15	–	17	.469
UMass Lowell	6	–	10	.375	17	–	15	.531
New Hampshire	6	–	10	.375	8	–	24	.250
UMBC	5	–	11	.313	13	–	19	.406
NJIT	3	–	13	.188	6	–	25	.194
† 2025 AmEast tournament winner

The 2024–25 Bryant Bulldogs men's basketball team represented Bryant University during the 2024–25 NCAA Division I men's basketball season. The Bulldogs, led by second-year head coach Phil Martelli Jr., played their home games at the Chace Athletic Center in Smithfield, Rhode Island as members of the America East Conference.

== Previous season ==
The Bulldogs finished the 2023–24 season 20–13, 11–5 in America East play, to finish in a tie for second place. They defeated Maine in the quarterfinals of the America East tournament, before falling to UMass Lowell in the semifinals.

== Roster ==
2024–25 Bryant Bulldogs men's basketball team
Players
Coaches

Pos.	#	Name	Height	Weight	Year	Previous school	Hometown
G	0	Earl Timberlake (5Y)	6 ft 6 in (1.98 m)	220 lb (100 kg)	Sr	Memphis	Washington, D.C.
F	1	Kvonn Cramer (5Y)	6 ft 7 in (2.01 m)	225 lb (102 kg)	Sr	Hofstra	Wilmington, DE
G	2	Khalil Williams	6 ft 5 in (1.96 m)	190 lb (86 kg)	Fr	Hargrave Military Academy	Washington, D.C.
G	4	Devean Williams	6 ft 3 in (1.91 m)	180 lb (82 kg)	Jr	Canisius	Los Angeles, CA
F	5	Barry Evans	6 ft 8 in (2.03 m)	215 lb (98 kg)	Jr	St. Bonaventure	Baltimore, MD
F	7	Connor Withers (6Y)	6 ft 8 in (2.03 m)	200 lb (91 kg)	Sr	UMass Lowell	Manassas, VA
G	11	Kam Farris (5Y)	6 ft 3 in (1.91 m)	175 lb (79 kg)	Sr	Marist	Burlington, VT
F	12	Favour Aire	6 ft 11 in (2.11 m)	220 lb (100 kg)	Jr	Penn State	Ekpoma, Nigeria
G	13	Jakai Robinson	6 ft 5 in (1.96 m)	208 lb (94 kg)	Jr	Miami (FL)	Ossining, NY
G	14	Frankie Vassalluzzo	6 ft 0 in (1.83 m)	175 lb (79 kg)	Fr	Pine Crest School	Boca Raton, FL
G	21	Aaron Davis	6 ft 7 in (2.01 m)	215 lb (98 kg)	So	First Love Christian Academy	Bay Shore, NY
F	22	Keyshawn Mitchell	6 ft 11 in (2.11 m)	215 lb (98 kg)	So	First Love Christian Academy	Brooklyn, NY
G	24	Rafael Pinzon	6 ft 6 in (1.98 m)	195 lb (88 kg)	Sr	St. John's	Arecibo, Puerto Rico
G	40	Jayden Brown	5 ft 11 in (1.8 m)	160 lb (73 kg)	Fr	Immaculate Conception HS	Teaneck, NJ
G	41	Jason Koval	5 ft 10 in (1.78 m)	165 lb (75 kg)	Fr	Riverstone International School	Boise, ID
G	43	Langston Bailey	5 ft 9 in (1.75 m)	142 lb (64 kg)	Fr	Springdale Prep	Riverdale, MD
F	50	Josh Ozabor	6 ft 7 in (2.01 m)	220 lb (100 kg)	Sr	IMG Academy	Johannesburg, South Africa
G	51	Michael Amador	6 ft 1 in (1.85 m)	180 lb (82 kg)	Fr	West Morris Central HS	Long Valley, NJ
G	53	Jason Sepe	6 ft 3 in (1.91 m)	170 lb (77 kg)	Fr	Ponaganset HS	Foster, RI

Head coach

- Phil Martelli Jr. (Saint Joseph's)

Assistant coach(es)

- Chris Cole (New Mexico State)
- Brendan Phelps (Eastern CT)
- Ryan Daly (Saint Joseph's)
- Nick Schmidt (Alfred State)

Legend

- (C) Team captain
- (S) Suspended
- (I) Ineligible
- (W) Walk-on
- (5Y) Fifth-year senior
- (6Y) Sixth-year senior
- Injured
- Current redshirt

Roster
Last update: October 7, 2024

== Schedule and results ==
Date time, TV	Rank^{#}	Opponent^{#}	Result	Record	Site (attendance) city, state
Non-conference regular season
November 4, 2024*; 8:00 p.m., ESPN+		Dean	W 105–63	1–0	Chace Athletic Center (1,054); Smithfield, RI
November 8, 2024*; 7:00 p.m., ESPN+		Siena	L 88–90 ^{OT}	1–1	Chace Athletic Center (703); Smithfield, RI
November 14, 2024*; 7:00 p.m., ESPN+		at Buffalo	W 87–64	2–1	Alumni Arena (1,159); Amherst, NY
November 18, 2024*; 6:30 p.m., FloHoops		at Delaware	W 85–84	3–1	Bob Carpenter Center (2,384); Newark, DE
November 21, 2024*; 7:00 p.m., NEC Front Row		at Stonehill	L 66–67	3–2	Merkert Gymnasium (1,324); Easton, MA
November 24, 2024*; 2:00 p.m., ESPN+		at St. Bonaventure	L 70–85	3–3	Reilly Center (3,919); St. Bonaventure, NY
November 26, 2024*; 4:00 p.m.		vs. Tennessee State; Coke Classic	W 97–85	4–3	McKenzie Arena (268); Chattanooga, TN
November 27, 2024*; 2:00 p.m., ESPN+		at Chattanooga; Coke Classic	L 76–84	4–4	McKenzie Arena (2,712); Chattanooga, TN
December 2, 2024*; 7:00 p.m., NBCSPHI		at Drexel	W 78–73	5–4	Daskalakis Athletic Center (1,061); Philadelphia, PA
December 6, 2024*; 6:00 p.m., ESPN+		Brown	L 75–76	5–5	Chace Athletic Center (1,234); Smithfield, RI
December 8, 2024*; 2:00 p.m., ESPN+		VTSU–Johnson	W 122–63	6–5	Chace Athletic Center (750); Smithfield, RI
December 11, 2024*; 7:00 p.m., CBSSN		at St. John's	L 77–99	6–6	Carnesecca Arena (4,573); Queens, NY
December 14, 2024*; 2:30 p.m., CBSSN		vs. Fordham; Basketball Hall of Fame Showcase	L 84–86	6–7	Mohegan Sun Arena (2,145); Uncasville, CT
December 22, 2024*; 1:00 p.m., Monumental/FloHoops		at Towson	L 65–70	6–8	TU Arena (1,500); Towson, MD
December 30, 2024*; 8:00 p.m., ESPN+		at Grand Canyon	L 66–112	6–9	Global Credit Union Arena (7,214); Phoenix, AZ
America East regular season
January 4, 2025; 2:00 p.m., ESPN+		Maine	W 81–55	7–9 (1–0)	Chace Athletic Center (795); Smithfield, RI
January 11, 2025; 2:00 p.m., ESPN+		Vermont	W 73–53	8–9 (2–0)	Chace Athletic Center (827); Smithfield, RI
January 16, 2025; 6:30 p.m., ESPN+		at Albany	W 89–79	9–9 (3–0)	Broadview Center (1,382); Albany, NY
January 18, 2025; 4:00 p.m., ESPN+		UMass Lowell	W 85–62	10–9 (4–0)	Chace Athletic Center (734); Smithfield, RI
January 23, 2025; 7:00 p.m., ESPN+		at New Hampshire	W 95–76	11–9 (5–0)	Lundholm Gym (331); Durham, NH
January 25, 2025; 2:00 p.m., ESPN+		Binghamton	W 83–69	12–9 (6–0)	Chace Athletic Center (973); Smithfield, RI
January 30, 2025; 6:00 p.m., ESPN+		at UMBC	W 92–86	13–9 (7–0)	Chesapeake Employers Insurance Arena (3,089); Catonsville, MD
February 1, 2025; 2:00 p.m., ESPN+		at NJIT	W 92–70	14–9 (8–0)	Wellness and Events Center (452); Newark, NJ
February 6, 2025; 6:00 p.m., ESPN+		Albany	L 63–68	14–10 (8–1)	Chace Athletic Center (1,022); Smithfield, RI
February 8, 2025; 2:00 p.m., ESPN+		at Binghamton	W 78–71	15–10 (9–1)	Dr. Bai Lee Court (3,081); Vestal, NY
February 13, 2025; 6:00 p.m., ESPN+		NJIT	W 88–66	16–10 (10–1)	Chace Athletic Center (873); Smithfield, RI
February 15, 2025; 1:00 p.m., ESPN+		UMBC	W 81–79	17–10 (11–1)	Chace Athletic Center (891); Smithfield, RI
February 20, 2025; 7:00 p.m., ESPN+		at Vermont	L 55–59	17–11 (11–2)	Patrick Gym (2,534); Burlington, VT
February 27, 2025; 6:00 p.m., ESPN+		at UMass Lowell	W 79–78	18–11 (12–2)	Costello Athletic Center (508); Lowell, MA
March 1, 2025; 2:00 p.m., ESPN+		at Maine	W 80–72	19–11 (13–2)	Memorial Gymnasium (1,129); Orono, ME
March 4, 2025; 6:00 p.m., ESPN+		New Hampshire	W 90–56	20–11 (14–2)	Chace Athletic Center (1,122); Smithfield, RI
America East tournament
March 8, 2025; 4:00 p.m., ESPN+	(1)	(8) UMBC; Quarterfinals	W 85–74	21–11	Chace Athletic Center (1,005); Smithfield, RI
March 11, 2025; 9:00 p.m., ESPN2	(1)	(4) Albany; Semifinals	W 91–78	22–11	Chace Athletic Center (1,001); Smithfield, RI
March 15, 2025; 11:00 a.m., ESPN2	(1)	(3) Maine; Championship	W 77–59	23–11	Chace Athletic Center (1,538); Smithfield, RI
NCAA tournament
March 21, 2025*; 10:00 p.m., TBS	(15 S)	vs. (2 S) No. 8 Michigan State; First Round	L 62–87	23–12	Rocket Arena (17,392); Cleveland, OH
*Non-conference game. ^{#}Rankings from AP poll. (#) Tournament seedings in parentheses. S=South. All times are in Eastern.
