= 2024–25 UMBC Retrievers men's basketball team =

American college basketball season

2024–25 UMBC Retrievers men's basketball
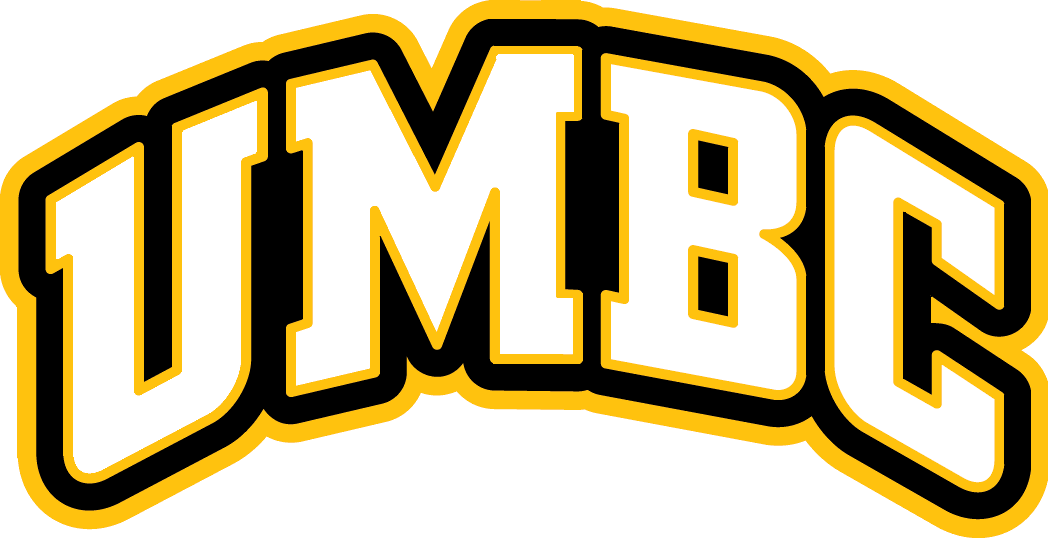
- Conference: America East Conference
- Record: 13–19 (5–11 America East)
- Head coach: Jim Ferry (4th season)
- Assistant coaches: Danny Lawson; Evann Baker; Brian Baudinet; Ceasar Adim; Gabe Maturo
- Home arena: Chesapeake Employers Insurance Arena

2024–25 America East Conference men's basketball standings
| | Conf. | | | | Overall |
| Team | W | | L | PCT | W | | L | PCT |
|---|---|---|---|---|---|---|---|---|
| Bryant † | 14 | – | 2 | .875 | 23 | – | 12 | .657 |
| Vermont | 13 | – | 3 | .813 | 21 | – | 12 | .636 |
| Maine | 10 | – | 6 | .625 | 20 | – | 14 | .588 |
| Albany | 8 | – | 8 | .500 | 17 | – | 16 | .515 |
| Binghamton | 7 | – | 9 | .438 | 15 | – | 17 | .469 |
| UMass Lowell | 6 | – | 10 | .375 | 17 | – | 15 | .531 |
| New Hampshire | 6 | – | 10 | .375 | 8 | – | 24 | .250 |
| UMBC | 5 | – | 11 | .313 | 13 | – | 19 | .406 |
| NJIT | 3 | – | 13 | .188 | 6 | – | 25 | .194 |
† 2025 AmEast tournament winner

The 2024–25 UMBC Retrievers men's basketball team represented the University of Maryland, Baltimore County during the 2024–25 NCAA Division I men's basketball season. The Retrievers, led by fourth-year head coach Jim Ferry, played their home games at the Chesapeake Employers Insurance Arena in Catonsville, Maryland as members of the America East Conference. They finished the season 13–19, 5–11 in America East play to finish in eighth place. They lost in the quarterfinals of the America East tournament to Bryant.

== Previous season ==
The Retrievers finished the 2023–24 season 11–21, 6–10 in America East play to finish in seventh place. They were defeated by UMass Lowell in the quarterfinals of the America East tournament.

== Roster ==
2024–25 UMBC Retrievers men's basketball team
Players
Coaches

| Pos. | # | Name | Height | Weight | Year | Previous school | Hometown |
|---|---|---|---|---|---|---|---|
| F | 0 | Regimantas Ciunys | 6 ft 6 in (1.98 m) | 190 lb (86 kg) | Jr | The Harvey School | Vilnius, Lithuania |
| G | 1 | Ace Valentine | 6 ft 3 in (1.91 m) | 190 lb (86 kg) | So | Mount Saint Joseph High School | Columbia, Maryland |
| F | 2 | Josh Odunowo | 6 ft 6 in (1.98 m) | 215 lb (98 kg) | GS | Columbia | Laurel, Maryland |
| G | 3 | Chaydon Stone | 6 ft 3 in (1.91 m) | 185 lb (84 kg) | Jr | New Mexico Junior College | Macon, Georgia |
| G | 4 | Marlon Short | 6 ft 6 in (1.98 m) | 190 lb (86 kg) | Sr | Stanislaus State | Richmond, California |
| F | 5 | Daylon Dickerson | 6 ft 6 in (1.98 m) | 200 lb (91 kg) | So | Kaufman High School | Kaufman, Texas |
| F | 6 | Louie Jordan | 6 ft 9 in (2.06 m) | 220 lb (100 kg) | Jr | Weber State | Leicester, England |
| F | 7 | Tim Eze | 6 ft 7 in (2.01 m) | 200 lb (91 kg) | Fr | Bill Crothers Prep | Kleinburg, Ontario |
| G | 10 | Devan Sapp | 6 ft 4 in (1.93 m) | 215 lb (98 kg) | Sr | City College of San Francisco | San Jose, California |
| G/F | 11 | Jake Stout | 6 ft 5 in (1.96 m) | 200 lb (91 kg) | Fr | Boys' Latin School of Maryland | Catonsville, Maryland |
| G | 13 | Isaac Varghese | 6 ft 1 in (1.85 m) | 185 lb (84 kg) | So | Jericho High School | Jericho, New York |
| F | 14 | Alpha Chibambe | 6 ft 5 in (1.96 m) | 210 lb (95 kg) | So | Phoenix Prep | Kinshasa, DR Congo |
| G | 15 | Ashton Reese | 6 ft 5 in (1.96 m) | 185 lb (84 kg) | So | Pinnacle High School | Scottsdale, Arizona |
| G | 20 | JC Harris | 6 ft 1 in (1.85 m) | 190 lb (86 kg) | Sr | Northwest High School | Gaithersburg, Maryland |
| G | 22 | Torin Bosch | 6 ft 4 in (1.93 m) | 200 lb (91 kg) | Fr | Perkiomen School | Chandler, Arizona |
| G | 23 | Bryce Johnson | 6 ft 4 in (1.93 m) | 190 lb (86 kg) | Sr | Chicago State | Orlando, Florida |
| G | 24 | Marcus Banks Jr. | 6 ft 3 in (1.91 m) | 195 lb (88 kg) | Sr | Odessa College | Hampton, Virginia |

Head coach

- Jim Ferry (Keene State)

Assistant coach(es)

- Danny Lawson (Bentley)
- Evann Baker (Quinnipiac)
- Brian Baudinet (UMass)
- Ceasar Adim (UMass)
- Gabe Maturo (UMBC)

Legend

- (C) Team captain
- (S) Suspended
- (I) Ineligible
- (W) Walk-on
- Injured
- Current redshirt

Roster
Last update: October 9, 2024

== Schedule and results ==
| Date time, TV | Rank^{#} | Opponent^{#} | Result | Record | Site (attendance) city, state |
Non-conference regular season
| November 4, 2024*; 4:00 pm, ESPN+ | | Penn State–York | W 95−66 | 1−0 | Chesapeake Employers Insurance Arena (1,023); Catonsville, MD |
| November 8, 2024*; 6:00 pm, BTN | | at Penn State | L 54–103 | 1–1 | Bryce Jordan Center (7,353); University Park, PA |
| November 11, 2024*; 6:00 pm, ESPN+ | | Valley Forge | W 120–61 | 2–1 | Chesapeake Employers Insurance Arena (1,014); Catonsville, MD |
| November 14, 2024*; 7:00 pm, ESPN+ | | Coppin State | W 92–67 | 3–1 | Chesapeake Employers Insurance Arena (1,284); Catonsville, MD |
| November 16, 2024*; 2:00 pm, ESPN+ | | Saint Peter's | L 61–69 | 3–2 | Chesapeake Employers Insurance Arena (1,335); Catonsville, MD |
| November 19, 2024*; 7:00 pm, ESPN+ | | Hampton | L 68–78 | 3–3 | Chesapeake Employers Insurance Arena (1,743); Catonsville, MD |
| November 23, 2024*; 12:00 pm, ESPN+ | | Boston University | L 71–75 | 3–4 | Chesapeake Employers Insurance Arena (1,273); Catonsville, MD |
| November 25, 2024*; 12:00 pm, ESPN+ | | Howard | W 95–77 | 4–4 | Chesapeake Employers Insurance Arena (1,077); Catonsville, MD |
| November 27, 2024*; 12:00 pm, ESPN+ | | Morgan State | W 92–69 | 5–4 | Chesapeake Employers Insurance Arena (1,062); Catonsville, MD |
| December 2, 2024*; 6:30 pm, FS1 | | at Georgetown | L 62–86 | 5–5 | Capital One Arena (2,788); Washington, D.C. |
| December 7, 2024*; 1:00 pm, Monumental/FloHoops | | at Towson | W 84–71 | 6–5 | TU Arena (1,965); Towson, MD |
| December 10, 2024*; 6:00 pm, ESPN+ | | Cairn | W 103–57 | 7–5 | Chesapeake Employers Insurance Arena (1,178); Catonsville, MD |
| December 18, 2024*; 7:30 pm, ACCNX/ESPN+ | | at Georgia Tech | L 82–91 | 7–6 | McCamish Pavilion (3,494); Atlanta, GA |
| December 21, 2024*; 1:00 pm, ESPN+ | | at Marist | L 73–76 ^{OT} | 7–7 | McCann Arena (867); Poughkeepsie, NY |
| December 29, 2024*; 4:00 pm, ESPN+ | | at American | W 96–93 ^{2OT} | 8–7 | Bender Arena (783); Washington, D.C. |
America East regular season
| January 4, 2025; 2:00 pm, ESPN+ | | at Binghamton | L 82–87 | 8–8 (0–1) | Dr. Bai Lee Court (1,812); Vestal, NY |
| January 9, 2025; 7:00 pm, ESPN+ | | at NJIT | W 87–64 | 9–8 (1–1) | Wellness and Events Center (376); Newark, NJ |
| January 16, 2025; 6:00 pm, ESPN+ | | New Hampshire | L 76–79 | 9–9 (1–2) | Chesapeake Employers Insurance Arena (1,085); Catonsville, MD |
| January 18, 2025; 1:00 pm, ESPN+ | | Maine | L 62–87 | 9–10 (1–3) | Chesapeake Employers Insurance Arena (1,425); Catonsville, MD |
| January 23, 2025; 6:30 pm, ESPN+ | | at Albany | W 92–87 ^{OT} | 10–10 (2–3) | Broadview Center (2,017); Albany, NY |
| January 25, 2025; 1:00 pm, ESPN+ | | at Vermont | W 80–63 | 11–10 (3–3) | Patrick Gym (2,537); Burlington, VT |
| January 30, 2025; 6:00 pm, ESPN+ | | Bryant | L 86–92 | 11–11 (3–4) | Chesapeake Employers Insurance Arena (3,089); Catonsville, MD |
| February 1, 2025; 1:00 pm, ESPN+ | | UMass Lowell | L 67–83 | 11–12 (3–5) | Chesapeake Employers Insurance Arena (1,856); Catonsville, MD |
| February 6, 2025; 7:00 pm, ESPN+ | | at New Hampshire | L 78–79 | 11–13 (3–6) | Lundholm Gym (241); Durham, NH |
| February 8, 2025; 2:00 pm, ESPN+ | | at Maine | L 50–73 | 11–14 (3–7) | Memorial Gymnasium (1,002); Orono, ME |
| February 13, 2025; 6:00 pm, ESPN+ | | Binghamton | W 81–77 | 12–14 (4–7) | Chesapeake Employers Insurance Arena (1,257); Catonsville, MD |
| February 15, 2025; 1:00 pm, ESPN+ | | at Bryant | L 79–81 | 12–15 (4–8) | Chace Athletic Center (891); Smithfield, RI |
| February 20, 2025; 6:00 pm, ESPN+ | | at UMass Lowell | L 79–98 | 12–16 (4–9) | Costello Athletic Center (691); Lowell, MA |
| February 22, 2025; 12:00 pm, ESPN+ | | NJIT | W 95–91 | 13–16 (5–9) | Chesapeake Employers Insurance Arena (1,625); Catonsville, MD |
| February 27, 2025; 6:00 pm, ESPN+ | | Albany | L 74–78 | 13–17 (5–10) | Chesapeake Employers Insurance Arena (1,654); Catonsville, MD |
| March 1, 2025; 1:00 pm, ESPN+ | | Vermont | L 69–79 | 13–18 (5–11) | Chesapeake Employers Insurance Arena (2,066); Catonsville, MD |
America East tournament
| March 8, 2025; 4:00 p.m., ESPN+ | (8) | at (1) Bryant; Quarterfinals | L 74–85 | 13–19 | Chace Athletic Center (1,005); Smithfield, RI |
*Non-conference game. ^{#}Rankings from AP Poll. (#) Tournament seedings in parentheses. All times are in Eastern.
