= 2024–25 Washington Huskies men's basketball team =

American college basketball season

2024–25 Washington Huskies men's basketball

Acrisure Invitational champions
- Conference: Big Ten Conference
- Record: 13–18 (4–16 Big Ten)
- Head coach: Danny Sprinkle (1st season)
- Assistant coaches: Andy Hill (1st season); Tony Bland (1st season); DeMarlo Slocum (1st season); Jerry Hobbie (2nd season)
- Home arena: Alaska Airlines Arena

2024–25 Big Ten Conference men's basketball standings
| | Conf. | | | | Overall |
| Team | W | | L | PCT | W | | L | PCT |
|---|---|---|---|---|---|---|---|---|
| No. 7 Michigan State | 17 | – | 3 | .850 | 30 | – | 7 | .811 |
| No. 9 Maryland | 14 | – | 6 | .700 | 27 | – | 9 | .750 |
| No. 10 Michigan † | 14 | – | 6 | .700 | 27 | – | 10 | .730 |
| UCLA | 13 | – | 7 | .650 | 23 | – | 11 | .676 |
| No. 16 Wisconsin | 13 | – | 7 | .650 | 27 | – | 10 | .730 |
| No. 14 Purdue | 13 | – | 7 | .650 | 24 | – | 12 | .667 |
| Illinois | 12 | – | 8 | .600 | 22 | – | 13 | .629 |
| Oregon | 12 | – | 8 | .600 | 25 | – | 10 | .714 |
| Indiana | 10 | – | 10 | .500 | 19 | – | 13 | .594 |
| Ohio State | 9 | – | 11 | .450 | 17 | – | 15 | .531 |
| Rutgers | 8 | – | 12 | .400 | 15 | – | 17 | .469 |
| Minnesota | 7 | – | 13 | .350 | 15 | – | 17 | .469 |
| Northwestern | 7 | – | 13 | .350 | 17 | – | 16 | .515 |
| USC | 7 | – | 13 | .350 | 17 | – | 18 | .486 |
| Iowa | 7 | – | 13 | .350 | 17 | – | 16 | .515 |
| Nebraska | 7 | – | 13 | .350 | 21 | – | 14 | .600 |
| Penn State | 6 | – | 14 | .300 | 16 | – | 15 | .516 |
| Washington | 4 | – | 16 | .200 | 13 | – | 18 | .419 |
† 2025 Big Ten tournament winner Rankings from AP poll

The 2024–25 Washington Huskies men's basketball team represented the University of Washington in the 2024–25 NCAA Division I men's basketball season. The Huskies, led by first-year head coach Danny Sprinkle, played their home games at Alaska Airlines Arena at Hec Edmundson Pavilion in Seattle, Washington as first-year members of the Big Ten Conference. They finished the season 13–18, 4–16 in Big Ten play to finish in last place. They failed to qualify for the Big Ten tournament.

== Previous season ==
The Huskies finished the 2023–24 season 17–15, 9–11 in Pac-12 play to finish in a three-way tie for sixth place. As the No. 8 seed in the Pac-12 tournament, they lost to USC in the first round.

On March 8, 2024, the school announced that head coach Mike Hopkins would be fired after the season. On March 25, the school named Utah State head coach Danny Sprinkle the team's new head coach.

The season marked the final year for Washington as a member of the Pac-12; in August 2023, the university announced it would join the Big Ten Conference in 2024.

== Offseason ==
=== Departures ===
Washington departures
| Name | Number | Pos. | Height | Weight | Year | Hometown | Reason for departure |
|---|---|---|---|---|---|---|---|
| Koren Johnson | 0 | G | 6'2" | 175 | Sophomore | Seattle, WA | Transferred to Louisville |
| Keion Brooks Jr. | 1 | F | 6'7" | 210 | GS senior | Fort Wayne, IN | Graduated |
| Wesley Yates III | 4 | G | 6'4" | 200 | Freshman | Beaumont, TX | Transferred to USC |
| Sahvir Wheeler | 5 | G | 5'9" | 180 | GS senior | Harlem, NY | Graduated |
| Isaiah Sherrard | 7 | F | 6'6" | 175 | Freshman | West Lake Village, CA | Walk-on; not on team roster |
| Nate Calmese | 8 | G | 6'2" | 164 | Sophomore | Gilbert, AZ | Transferred to Washington State |
| Paul Mulcahy | 9 | G | 6'7" | 213 | GS senior | Bayonne, NJ | Graduated |
| Moses Wood | 13 | F | 6'8" | 210 | GS senior | Reno, NV | Graduated |
| Anthony Holland | 23 | G | 6'5" | 225 | GS senior | Riverside, CA | Graduated |
| Braxton Meah | 34 | C | 7'1" | 250 | Senior | Fresno, CA | Graduate transferred to Nebraska |
| Samuel Ariyibi | 35 | F | 6'8" | 190 | Junior | Lagos, Nigeria | Transferred to Utah Tech |

=== Incoming transfers ===
Washington incoming transfers
| Name | Number | Pos. | Height | Weight | Year | Hometown | Previous school |
|---|---|---|---|---|---|---|---|
| Mekhi Mason | 0 | G | 6'5" | 195 | Junior | Gilbert, AZ | Rice |
| Great Osobor | 1 | G/F | 6'8" | 250 | Senior | Bradford, England | Utah State |
| DJ Davis | 4 | G | 6'1" | 175 | GS senior | Moreno Valley, CA | Butler |
| Chris Conway | 5 | F | 6'9" | 221 | Senior | Naperville, IL | Oakland |
| Tyree Ihenacho | 6 | G | 6'4" | 190 | Senior | Prior Lake, MN | North Dakota |
| Tyler Harris | 8 | G | 6'8" | 185 | Sophomore | Hayward, CA | Portland |
| Luis Kortright | 12 | G | 6'3" | 200 | Senior | Manhattan, NY | Rhode Island |
| KC Ibekwe | 24 | C | 6'10" | 287 | Junior | Coquitlam, BC | Oregon State |

=== 2024 recruiting class ===
College recruiting
| Name | Hometown | School | Height | Weight | Commit date |
|---|---|---|---|---|---|
| Zoom Diallo #11 PG | Tacoma, WA | Prolific Prep | 6 ft 3 in (1.91 m) | 180 lb (82 kg) | Dec 23, 2023 |
| Zoom Diallo #11 PG | Recruit ratings: Rivals: 247Sports: ESPN: (87) | | | | |
| Jase Butler #29 SG | Ross, CA | The Branson School | 6 ft 4 in (1.93 m) | 180 lb (82 kg) | Apr 22, 2024 |
| Jase Butler #29 SG | Recruit ratings: Rivals: 247Sports: ESPN: (81) | | | | |
Overall recruit ranking: Rivals: 38 247Sports: 46
Note: In many cases, Scout, Rivals, 247Sports, On3, and ESPN may conflict in their listings of height and weight.; In these cases, the average was taken. ESPN grades are on a 100-point scale.; Sources: "2024 Washington Commits". Rivals.; "ESPN- Washington Huskies Men's Basketball Recruiting". ESPN.; "2024 Team Ranking". Rivals.

== Roster ==
2024–25 Washington Huskies men's basketball team
Players
Coaches

| Pos. | # | Name | Height | Weight | Year | Previous school | Hometown |
|---|---|---|---|---|---|---|---|
| G | 0 | Mekhi Mason | 6 ft 5 in (1.96 m) | 195 lb (88 kg) | Jr | Rice | Gilbert, AZ |
| F | 1 | Great Osobor | 6 ft 8 in (2.03 m) | 245 lb (111 kg) | Sr | Utah State | Bradford, England |
| G | 4 | DJ Davis | 6 ft 1 in (1.85 m) | 175 lb (79 kg) | GS | Butler | Moreno Valley, CA |
| F | 5 | Chris Conway | 6 ft 9 in (2.06 m) | 221 lb (100 kg) | Sr | Oakland | Naperville, IL |
| G | 6 | Tyree Ihenacho | 6 ft 4 in (1.93 m) | 190 lb (86 kg) | Sr | North Dakota | Prior Lake, Minnesota |
| F | 7 | Christian King | 6 ft 8 in (2.03 m) | 215 lb (98 kg) | So | Seattle Prep | Kirkland, WA |
| G | 8 | Tyler Harris | 6 ft 8 in (2.03 m) | 190 lb (86 kg) | So | Portland | Hayward, CA |
| G | 9 | Zoom Diallo | 6 ft 4 in (1.93 m) | 180 lb (82 kg) | Fr | Curtis | Tacoma, WA |
| F | 10 | Will Landram (W) | 6 ft 5 in (1.96 m) | 168 lb (76 kg) | So | Gig Harbor | Gig Harbor, WA |
| C | 11 | Franck Kepnang | 6 ft 11 in (2.11 m) | 253 lb (115 kg) | GS | Oregon | Yaoundé, Cameroon |
| G | 12 | Luis Kortright | 6 ft 3 in (1.91 m) | 200 lb (91 kg) | Sr | Rhode Island | Manhattan, NY |
| G | 13 | Jase Butler | 6 ft 4 in (1.93 m) | 180 lb (82 kg) | Fr | The Branson School | San Anselmo, CA |
| G | 20 | Dylan Mansour (W) | 6 ft 3 in (1.91 m) | 180 lb (82 kg) | Fr | Campolindo | Lafayette, CA |
| C | 24 | KC Ibekwe | 6 ft 10 in (2.08 m) | 287 lb (130 kg) | Jr | Oregon State | Coquitlam, BC |
| F | 32 | Wilhelm Breidenbach | 6 ft 10 in (2.08 m) | 232 lb (105 kg) | Sr | Nebraska | Rancho Santa Margarita, CA |
| G | 33 | Sam Slutske (W) | 6 ft 2 in (1.88 m) | 174 lb (79 kg) | Jr | Crossroads | Santa Monica, CA |

Head coach

- Danny Sprinkle (Montana State)

Assistant coach(es)

- Andy Hill (Eastern Washington)
- Tony Bland (San Diego State)
- DeMarlo Slocum (Georgia Southern)
- Jerry Hobbie (Fordham)

Legend

- (C) Team captain
- (S) Suspended
- (I) Ineligible
- (W) Walk-on
- Injured
- Current redshirt

Roster

== Schedule and results ==
| Date time, TV | Rank^{#} | Opponent^{#} | Result | Record | High points | High rebounds | High assists | Site (attendance) city, state |
Exhibition
| October 29, 2024*; 7:00 p.m., B1G+ | | Western Oregon | W 105–68 | | 16 – Davis | 8 – Tied | 4 – Tied | Alaska Airlines Arena (5,042); Seattle, WA |
Regular season
| November 5, 2024*; 7:00 p.m., BTN | | UC Davis | W 79–73 | 1–0 | 15 – Osobor | 17 – Osobor | 4 – Diallo | Alaska Airlines Arena (5,355); Seattle, WA |
| November 9, 2024*; 7:00 p.m., MW Network | | at Nevada | L 53–63 | 1–1 | 15 – Ihenacho | 9 – Osobor | 3 – Osobor | Lawlor Events Center (8,806); Reno, NV |
| November 13, 2024*; 7:00 p.m., B1G+ | | Seattle Pacific | W 77–62 | 2–1 | 18 – Tied | 8 – Osobor | 8 – Ihenacho | Alaska Airlines Arena (4,760); Seattle, WA |
| November 17, 2024*; 7:00 p.m., B1G+ | | UMass Lowell | W 74–69 | 3–1 | 23 – Osobor | 18 – Osobor | 3 – Diallo | Alaska Airlines Arena (5,378); Seattle, WA |
| November 22, 2024*; 7:00 p.m., B1G+ | | Alcorn State; Acrisure Invitational campus site game | W 77–60 | 4–1 | 27 – Harris | 8 – Harris | 4 – Tied | Alaska Airlines Arena (6,299); Seattle, WA |
| November 28, 2024*; 3:30 p.m., TruTV | | vs. Colorado State; Acrisure Invitational semifinals | W 73–67 | 5–1 | 24 – Harris | 8 – Tied | 7 – Osobor | Acrisure Arena (435); Thousand Palms, CA |
| November 29, 2024*; 1:30 p.m., TruTV | | vs. Santa Clara; Acrisure Invitational championships | W 76–69 | 6–1 | 15 – Diallo | 8 – Osobor | 5 – Osobor | Acrisure Arena (1,532); Thousand Palms, CA |
| December 3, 2024; 7:30 p.m., FS1 | | at UCLA | L 58–69 | 6–2 (0–1) | 14 – Osobor | 11 – Harris | 4 – Osobor | Pauley Pavilion (6,089); Los Angeles, CA |
| December 7, 2024; 3:00 p.m., BTN | | USC | L 61–85 | 6–3 (0–2) | 15 – Mason | 7 – Harris | 4 – Diallo | Alaska Airlines Arena (7,251); Seattle, WA |
| December 10, 2024*; 8:00 p.m., BTN | | Eastern Washington | W 87–69 | 7–3 | 23 – Mason | 5 – Tied | 5 – Tied | Alaska Airlines Arena (5,655); Seattle, WA |
| December 18, 2024*; 8:00 p.m., FS1 | | Washington State; Rivalry | W 89–73 | 8–3 | 21 – Davis | 8 – Osobor | 4 – Tied | Alaska Airlines Arena (7,880); Seattle, WA |
| December 23, 2024*; 7:00 p.m., BTN | | Seattle; Rivalry | L 70–79 | 8–4 | 20 – Harris | 10 – Osobor | 3 – Tied | Alaska Airlines Arena (7,228); Seattle, WA |
| December 29, 2024*; 12:00 p.m., Peacock | | NJIT | W 90–53 | 9–4 | 12 – Tied | 6 – Tied | 5 – Diallo | Alaska Airlines Arena (6,779); Seattle, WA |
| January 2, 2025; 6:30 p.m., BTN | | Maryland | W 75–69 | 10–4 (1–2) | 20 – Osobor | 14 – Osobor | 6 – Diallo | Alaska Airlines Arena (7,922); Seattle, WA |
| January 5, 2025; 1:00 p.m., BTN | | No. 22 Illinois | L 77–81 | 10–5 (1–3) | 31 – Davis | 6 – Breidenbach | 7 – Diallo | Alaska Airlines Arena (8,156); Seattle, WA |
| January 9, 2025; 5:00 p.m., BTN | | at No. 16 Michigan State | L 54–88 | 10–6 (1–4) | 14 – Harris | 4 – Tied | 6 – Kortright | Breslin Center (14,797); East Lansing, MI |
| January 12, 2025; 11:00 a.m., BTN | | at No. 24 Michigan | L 75–91 | 10–7 (1–5) | 23 – Osobor | 11 – Osobor | 4 – Tied | Crisler Center (12,707); Ann Arbor, MI |
| January 15, 2025; 6:30 p.m., BTN | | No. 17 Purdue | L 58–69 | 10–8 (1–6) | 28 – Osobor | 9 – Osobor | 4 – Osobor | Alaska Airlines Arena (7,789); Seattle, WA |
| January 21, 2025; 8:00 p.m., BTN | | at No. 15 Oregon | L 71–82 | 10–9 (1–7) | 20 – Osobor | 8 – Osobor | 3 – Tied | Matthew Knight Arena (7,083); Eugene, OR |
| January 24, 2025; 8:00 p.m., FS1 | | UCLA | L 60–65 | 10–10 (1–8) | 19 – Osobor | 9 – Osobor | 2 – Tied | Alaska Airlines Arena (7,709); Seattle, WA |
| February 1, 2025; 9:00 a.m., BTN | | at Minnesota | W 71–68 | 11–10 (2–8) | 23 – Harris | 10 – Osobor | 5 – Diallo | Williams Arena (9,202); Minneapolis, MN |
| February 5, 2025; 7:30 p.m., BTN | | Nebraska | L 72–86 | 11–11 (2–9) | 23 – Mason | 11 – Harris | 5 – Osobor | Alaska Airlines Arena (6,384); Seattle, WA |
| February 8, 2025; 7:30 p.m., BTN | | Northwestern | W 76–71 | 12–11 (3–9) | 18 – Harris | 9 – Osobor | 3 – Tied | Alaska Airlines Arena (8,064); Seattle, WA |
| February 12, 2025; 5:30 p.m., BTN | | at Ohio State | L 69–93 | 12–12 (3–10) | 14 – Tied | 6 – Osobor | 3 – Osobor | Value City Arena (9,987); Columbus, OH |
| February 15, 2025; 11:00 a.m., BTN | | at Penn State | W 75–73 | 13–12 (4–10) | 20 – Mason | 13 – Osobor | 10 – Osobor | Bryce Jordan Center (9,933); State College, PA |
| February 19, 2025; 7:30 p.m., BTN | | Rutgers | L 85–89 ^{OT} | 13–13 (4–11) | 20 – Tied | 7 – Kepnang | 5 – Diallo | Alaska Airlines Arena (8,036); Seattle, WA |
| February 22, 2025; 1:00 p.m., FS1 | | at Iowa | L 79–85 | 13–14 (4–12) | 19 – Mason | 11 – Osobor | 3 – Tied | Carver–Hawkeye Arena (10,393); Iowa City, IA |
| February 25, 2025; 6:00 p.m., Peacock | | at No. 11 Wisconsin | L 62–88 | 13–15 (4–13) | 11 – Osobor | 7 – Kepnang | 3 – Osobor | Kohl Center (14,804); Madison, WI |
| March 1, 2025; 3:00 p.m., Peacock | | Indiana | L 62–78 | 13–16 (4–14) | 18 – Diallo | 9 – Harris | 3 – Mason | Alaska Airlines Arena (7,851); Seattle, WA |
| March 5, 2025; 7:30 p.m., BTN | | at USC | L 61–92 | 13–17 (4–15) | 19 – Mason | 7 – Osobor | 7 – Osobor | Galen Center (5,856); Los Angeles, CA |
| March 9, 2025; 12:00 p.m., BTN | | Oregon | L 73–80 ^{OT} | 13–18 (4–16) | 21 – Osobor | 7 – Kepnang | 5 – Diallo | Alaska Airlines Arena (8,302); Seattle, WA |
*Non-conference game. ^{#}Rankings from AP Poll. (#) Tournament seedings in parentheses. All times are in Pacific Time.

== See also ==
- 2024–25 Washington Huskies women's basketball team
