= 2024–25 NJIT Highlanders men's basketball team =

American college basketball season

2024–25 NJIT Highlanders men's basketball
- Conference: America East Conference
- Record: 6–25 (3–13 America East)
- Head coach: Grant Billmeier (2nd season)
- Assistant coaches: RaShawn Stores; Pete Lappas; Thomas Messinger; Mike Hamlin
- Home arena: Joel and Diane Bloom Wellness and Events Center

2024–25 America East Conference men's basketball standings
	Conf.				Overall
Team	W		L	PCT	W		L	PCT
Bryant †	14	–	2	.875	23	–	12	.657
Vermont	13	–	3	.813	21	–	12	.636
Maine	10	–	6	.625	20	–	14	.588
Albany	8	–	8	.500	17	–	16	.515
Binghamton	7	–	9	.438	15	–	17	.469
UMass Lowell	6	–	10	.375	17	–	15	.531
New Hampshire	6	–	10	.375	8	–	24	.250
UMBC	5	–	11	.313	13	–	19	.406
NJIT	3	–	13	.188	6	–	25	.194
† 2025 AmEast tournament winner

The 2024–25 NJIT Highlanders men's basketball team represented the New Jersey Institute of Technology during the 2024–25 NCAA Division I men's basketball season. The Highlanders, led by second-year head coach Grant Billmeier, played their home games at the Joel and Diane Bloom Wellness and Events Center in Newark, New Jersey as members of the America East Conference. They finished the season 6–25, 3–13 in America East play to finish in last place. They failed to qualify for the America East tournament.

== Previous season ==
The Highlanders finished the 2023–24 season 7–21, 3–13 in America East play, to finish in last place. They failed to make the America East tournament, as only the top eight teams qualify.

== Roster ==
2024–25 NJIT Highlanders men's basketball team
Players
Coaches

Pos.	#	Name	Height	Weight	Year	Previous school	Hometown
G	0	Sebastian Robinson	6 ft 1 in (1.85 m)	190 lb (86 kg)	So	Roselle Catholic HS	Montclair, NJ
G	1	Walt Jr. Andrews	6 ft 4 in (1.93 m)	215 lb (98 kg)	Fr	Hargrave Military Academy	Bridgeport, CT
G	5	Jake Goldberg	6 ft 4 in (1.93 m)	190 lb (86 kg)	So	IMG Academy	Pasadena, CA
G	7	Cameron Piggee	6 ft 0 in (1.83 m)	180 lb (82 kg)	So	Rutgers Prep	North Brunswick, NJ
F	8	Jeffrey Akintolu	6 ft 7 in (2.01 m)	210 lb (95 kg)	So	Avon Old Farms	Welling, England
C	13	Stefan Jimenez-Vojnic	6 ft 11 in (2.11 m)	230 lb (104 kg)	Fr	Academy of Central Florida	Toronto, ON
G	14	Quentin Duncan	6 ft 4 in (1.93 m)	180 lb (82 kg)	Fr	Putnam Science Academy	Waterbury, CT
G	20	Tariq Francis	6 ft 0 in (1.83 m)	180 lb (82 kg)	So	First Love Christian Academy	Pittsburgh, PA
F	22	Levi Lawal	6 ft 7 in (2.01 m)	195 lb (88 kg)	So	Mt. Zion Prep	Laurel, MD
G	24	Ari Fulton	6 ft 7 in (2.01 m)	205 lb (93 kg)	Fr	Westover HS	Fayetteville, NC
F	25	John Kelly	6 ft 8 in (2.03 m)	205 lb (93 kg)	Fr	Rutgers Prep	Hillsborough, NJ
F	30	Tim Moore Jr.	6 ft 6 in (1.98 m)	215 lb (98 kg)	GS	Benedict College	Houston, Texas
C	32	Malachi Arrington	6 ft 11 in (2.11 m)	220 lb (100 kg)	Fr	Immaculate Conception HS	Somerville, NJ
F	33	Triston Wennersten	6 ft 6 in (1.98 m)	210 lb (95 kg)	GS	Ithaca	Ridgewood, NJ
F	43	Jordan Rogers	6 ft 6 in (1.98 m)	215 lb (98 kg)	Fr	The Phelps School	Ridgewood, NJ

Head coach

- Grant Billmeier (Seton Hall)

Assistant coach(es)

- RaShawn Stores (Manhattan)
- Pete Lappas (Boston College)
- Thomas Messinger (Emerson)
- Mike Hamlin (Bloomsburg)

Legend

- (C) Team captain
- (S) Suspended
- (I) Ineligible
- (W) Walk-on
- Injured
- Current redshirt

Roster
Last update: October 8, 2024

== Schedule and results ==
Date time, TV	Rank^{#}	Opponent^{#}	Result	Record	Site (attendance) city, state
Non-conference regular season
November 4, 2024*; 7:00 p.m., ESPN+		Penn	L 57–58	0–1	Wellness and Events Center (545); Newark, NJ
November 8, 2024*; 8:30 p.m., FS2		at Villanova	L 54–91	0–2	Finneran Pavilion (6,501); Villanova, PA
November 12, 2024*; 7:00 p.m., ESPN+		Loyola (MD)	L 50–68	0–3	Wellness and Events Center (555); Newark, NJ
November 16, 2024*; 11:00 a.m.		at Morgan State	L 69–81	0–4	Talmadge L. Hill Field House (127); Baltimore, MD
November 18, 2024*; 7:00 p.m., ESPN+		at George Washington	L 64–84	0—5	Charles E. Smith Center (1,682); Washington, D.C.
November 21, 2024*; 7:00 p.m., ESPN+		at Bucknell	L 64–81	0–6	Sojka Pavilion (719); Lewisburg, PA
November 26, 2024*; 6:00 p.m., ESPN+		at Cleveland State; Viking Invitational	L 53–56	0–7	Woodling Gym (403); Cleveland, OH
November 27, 2024*; 4:00 p.m., ESPN+		vs. Morehead State; Viking Invitational	W 78–69	1–7	Woodling Gym (107); Cleveland, OH
December 1, 2024*; 12:00 p.m., ESPN+		at UMass	L 68–80	1–8	Mullins Center (2,154); Amherst, MA
December 4, 2024*; 8:30 p.m., CBSSN		at Seton Hall	L 56–67	1–9	Prudential Center (8,099); Newark, NJ
December 7, 2024*; 2:00 p.m., ESPN+		Navy	W 69–64	2–9	Wellness and Events Center (518); Newark, NJ
December 11, 2024*; 7:00 p.m.		at Delaware State	L 59–71	2–10	Bayhealth Court (102); Dover, DE
December 14, 2024*; 4:00 p.m., ESPN+		Wagner	L 43–50	2–11	Wellness and Events Center (476); Newark, NJ
December 29, 2024*; 3:00 p.m., Peacock		at Washington	L 53–90	2–12	Alaska Airlines Arena (6,779); Seattle, WA
January 4, 2025*; 2:00 p.m., ESPN+		Medgar Evers	W 107–51	3–12	Wellness and Events Center (452); Newark, NJ
America East regular season
January 9, 2025; 7:00 p.m., ESPN+		UMBC	L 64–87	3–13 (0–1)	Wellness and Events Center (376); Newark, NJ
January 11, 2025; 1:00 p.m., ESPN+		at UMass Lowell	L 62–70	3–14 (0–2)	Costello Athletic Center (535); Lowell, MA
January 16, 2025; 11:00 a.m., ESPN+		Maine	L 44–57	3–15 (0–3)	Wellness and Events Center (1,672); Newark, NJ
January 18, 2025; 3:00 p.m., ESPN+		New Hampshire	W 64–59	4–15 (1–3)	Wellness and Events Center (333); Newark, NJ
January 23, 2025; 7:00 p.m., ESPN+		at Vermont	L 64–68	4–16 (1–4)	Patrick Gym (2,041); Burlington, VT
January 25, 2025; 4:00 p.m., ESPN+		at Albany	L 62–68	4–17 (1–5)	Broadview Center (2,038); Albany, NY
January 30, 2025; 7:00 p.m., ESPN+		UMass Lowell	W 83–62	5–17 (2–5)	Wellness and Events Center (576); Newark, NJ
February 1, 2025; 2:00 p.m., ESPN+		Bryant	L 70–92	5–18 (2–6)	Wellness and Events Center (452); Newark, NJ
February 6, 2025; 6:00 p.m., ESPN+		at Maine	L 74–78	5–19 (2–7)	Memorial Gymnasium (717); Orono, ME
February 8, 2025; 1:00 p.m., ESPN+		at New Hampshire	L 69–80	5–20 (2–8)	Lundholm Gym (447); Durham, NH
February 13, 2025; 6:00 p.m., ESPN+		at Bryant	L 66–88	5–21 (2–9)	Chace Athletic Center (873); Smithfield, RI
February 15, 2025; 2:00 p.m., ESPN+		Binghamton	L 71–75 ^{OT}	5–22 (2–10)	Wellness and Events Center (492); Newark, NJ
February 22, 2025; 12:00 p.m., ESPN+		at UMBC	L 91–95	5–23 (2–11)	Chesapeake Employers Insurance Arena (1,625); Catonsville, MD
February 27, 2025; 7:00 p.m., ESPN+		Vermont	L 61–71	5–24 (2–12)	Wellness and Events Center (612); Newark, NJ
March 1, 2025; 2:00 p.m., ESPN+		Albany	L 59–86	5–25 (2–13)	Wellness and Events Center (613); Newark, NJ
March 4, 2025; 6:07 pm, ESPN+		at Binghamton	W 75–72	6–25 (3–13)	Dr. Bai Lee Court (2,867); Vestal, NY
*Non-conference game. ^{#}Rankings from AP poll. (#) Tournament seedings in parentheses. All times are in Eastern.
