= 2024–25 Albany Great Danes men's basketball team =

American college basketball season

2024–25 Albany Great Danes men's basketball
- Conference: America East Conference
- Record: 17–16 (8–8 America East)
- Head coach: Dwayne Killings (4th season)
- Assistant coaches: Jim Whitesell; KJ Baptiste; Dan Madhavapallil; Jaylen Bond
- Home arena: Broadview Center

2024–25 America East Conference men's basketball standings
	Conf.				Overall
Team	W		L	PCT	W		L	PCT
Bryant †	14	–	2	.875	23	–	12	.657
Vermont	13	–	3	.813	21	–	12	.636
Maine	10	–	6	.625	20	–	14	.588
Albany	8	–	8	.500	17	–	16	.515
Binghamton	7	–	9	.438	15	–	17	.469
UMass Lowell	6	–	10	.375	17	–	15	.531
New Hampshire	6	–	10	.375	8	–	24	.250
UMBC	5	–	11	.313	13	–	19	.406
NJIT	3	–	13	.188	6	–	25	.194
† 2025 AmEast tournament winner

The 2024–25 Albany Great Danes men's basketball team represented the University at Albany, SUNY during the 2024–25 NCAA Division I men's basketball season. The Great Danes, led by fourth-year head coach Dwayne Killings, played their home games at the Broadview Center in Albany, New York as members of the America East Conference.

The Great Danes finished the season 17–16, 8–8 in America East play, to finish in fourth place. In the America East tournament, they defeated Binghamton in the quarterfinals before being eliminated by Bryant in the semifinals.

== Previous season ==
The Great Danes finished the 2023–24 season 13–19, 5–11 in America East play, to finish in eighth place. They were defeated by Vermont in the first round of the America East tournament.

== Roster ==
2024–25 Albany Great Danes men's basketball team
Players
Coaches

Pos.	#	Name	Height	Weight	Year	Previous school	Hometown
G	0	Damon Strand	6 ft 3 in (1.91 m)	190 lb (86 kg)	Jr	Raritan Valley Community College	Plainfield, NJ
G	1	Amar'e Marshall	6 ft 4 in (1.93 m)	204 lb (93 kg)	RS Jr	Hofstra	Montclair, NJ
F	2	Aaron Reddish	6 ft 7 in (2.01 m)	195 lb (88 kg)	Sr	Pebblebrook High School	Norristown, PA
G	3	Byron Joshua	5 ft 10 in (1.78 m)	160 lb (73 kg)	GS	Alcorn State	LaPlace, LA
G	4	Amir Lindsey	5 ft 10 in (1.78 m)	160 lb (73 kg)	Fr	Rivers School	Framingham, MA
G	5	DeMarr Jr. Langford	6 ft 4 in (1.93 m)	220 lb (100 kg)	Sr	Boston College	Worcester, MA
F	6	Kacper Klaczek	6 ft 8 in (2.03 m)	220 lb (100 kg)	Sr	Saint Joseph's	Katowice, Poland
G	7	Kani Topuz	6 ft 7 in (2.01 m)	190 lb (86 kg)	Fr	Hoosac School	Kadıköy, Turkey
G	8	Kheni Briggs	6 ft 3 in (1.91 m)	200 lb (91 kg)	Jr	Charleston Southern	Kannapolis, NC
C	10	Bautista Giralt	7 ft 0 in (2.13 m)	225 lb (102 kg)	RS Fr	Florida Day School	Buenos Aires, Argentina
F	11	Sultan Adewale	6 ft 8 in (2.03 m)	225 lb (102 kg)	So	Iona	East London, England
F	12	Justin Neely	6 ft 6 in (1.98 m)	210 lb (95 kg)	RS Jr	West Oaks Academy	Miami, Florida
F	13	Ma'Kye Taylor	6 ft 8 in (2.03 m)	220 lb (100 kg)	Fr	Imhotep Institute High School	Philadelphia, PA
G	14	Zach Matulu	6 ft 3 in (1.91 m)	190 lb (86 kg)	RS Fr	Shaker High School	Albany, NY
G	24	Zane Adnan	6 ft 4 in (1.93 m)	185 lb (84 kg)	So	Bullis School	Gaithersburg, MD

Head coach

- Dwayne Killings (Hampton)

Assistant coach(es)

- Jim Whitesell (Luther)
- KJ Baptiste (Brandeis)
- Dan Madhavapallil (Marquette)
- Jaylen Bond (Temple)

Legend

- (C) Team captain
- (S) Suspended
- (I) Ineligible
- (W) Walk-on
- Injured
- Current redshirt

Roster
Last update: October 6, 2024

== Schedule and results ==
Date time, TV	Rank^{#}	Opponent^{#}	Result	Record	Site (attendance) city, state
Exhibition
October 29, 2024*; 6:30 p.m.		Potsdam	W 100–57	–	Broadview Center; Albany, NY
Non-conference regular season
November 4, 2024*; 8:00 p.m., ESPN+		at Army	L 59–67	0–1	Christl Arena (350); West Point, NY
November 9, 2024*; 6:30 p.m., ESPN+		Oneonta	W 89–69	1–1	Broadview Center (2,020); Albany, NY
November 13, 2024*; 5:00 p.m., ESPN+		at Dartmouth	W 87–73	2–1	Leede Arena (721); Hanover, NH
November 16, 2024*; 7:00 p.m., ESPN+		Siena; Albany Cup	W 70–60	3–1	Broadview Center (3,899); Albany, NY
November 22, 2024*; 2:00 p.m.		vs. Puerto Rico–Mayagüez; Puerto Rico Clasico	W 93–50	4–1	Coliseo Rubén Rodríguez (20); Bayamón, Puerto Rico
November 23, 2024*; 2:00 p.m.		vs. Kansas City; Puerto Rico Clasico	W 67–65	5–1	Coliseo Rubén Rodríguez (100); Bayamón, Puerto Rico
November 24, 2024*; 12:00 p.m.		vs. American; Puerto Rico Clasico	L 77–81	5–2	Coliseo Rubén Rodríguez (100); Bayamón, Puerto Rico
November 30, 2024*; 4:00 p.m., FS2		at Georgetown	L 68–100	5–3	Capital One Arena (4,227); Washington, D.C.
December 4, 2024*; 6:30 p.m., ESPN+		Columbia	W 88–73	6–3	Broadview Center (2,027); Albany, NY
December 7, 2024*; 1:00 p.m., ESPN+		at Boston University	L 74–80 ^{OT}	6–4	Case Gym (720); Boston, MA
December 10, 2024*; 7:00 p.m., ESPN2		at Syracuse	L 85–102	6–5	JMA Wireless Dome (19,354); Syracuse, NY
December 14, 2024*; 7:00 p.m., ESPN+		Drexel	L 70–77	6–6	Broadview Center (1,577); Albany, NY
December 18, 2024*; 11:00 a.m., ESPN+		at Sacred Heart	W 74–66	7–6	William H. Pitt Center (1,800); Fairfield, CT
December 21, 2024*; 2:00 p.m., ESPN+		at Fordham	L 83–87	7–7	Rose Hill Gymnasium (1,412); The Bronx, NY
December 29, 2024*; 2:00 p.m., ESPN+		Stony Brook	W 77–70	8–7	Broadview Center (1,667); Albany, NY
America East regular season
January 4, 2025; 4:00 p.m., ESPN+		UMass Lowell	L 69–73	8–8 (0–1)	Broadview Center (2,025); Albany, NY
January 9, 2025; 7:00 p.m., ESPN+		at New Hampshire	W 61–57	9–8 (1–1)	Lundholm Gym (172); Durham, NH
January 11, 2025; 2:00 p.m., ESPN+		at Maine	L 66–87	9–9 (1–2)	Memorial Gymnasium (1,064); Orono, ME
January 16, 2025; 6:30 p.m., ESPN+		Bryant	L 79–89	9–10 (1–3)	Broadview Center (1,382); Albany, NY
January 18, 2025; 2:00 p.m., ESPN+		at Binghamton	W 70–65	10–10 (2–3)	Dr. Bai Lee Court (2,162); Vestal, NY
January 23, 2025; 6:30 p.m., ESPN+		UMBC	L 87–92 ^{OT}	10–11 (2–4)	Broadview Center (2,017); Albany, NY
January 25, 2025; 4:00 p.m., ESPN+		NJIT	W 68–62	11–11 (3–4)	Broadview Center (2,038); Albany, NY
February 1, 2025; 7:00 p.m., ESPN+		Binghamton	L 61–65	11–12 (3–5)	Broadview Center (2,625); Albany, NY
February 6, 2025; 6:00 p.m., ESPN+		at Bryant	W 68–63	12–12 (4–5)	Chace Athletic Center (1,022); Smithfield, RI
February 8, 2025; 7:00 p.m., ESPN+		Vermont	L 62–68	12–13 (4–6)	Broadview Center (2,315); Albany, NY
February 13, 2025; 6:00 p.m., ESPN+		at UMass Lowell	W 90–88 ^{OT}	13–13 (5–6)	Costello Athletic Center (515); Lowell, MA
February 20, 2025; 6:30 p.m., ESPN+		Maine	W 79–68	14–13 (6–6)	Broadview Center (2,150); Albany, NY
February 22, 2025; 7:00 p.m., ESPN+		New Hampshire	L 60–71	14–14 (6–7)	Broadview Center (2,280); Albany, NY
February 27, 2025; 6:00 p.m., ESPN+		at UMBC	W 78–74	15–14 (7–7)	Chesapeake Employers Insurance Arena (1,654); Catonsville, MD
March 1, 2025; 2:00 p.m., ESPN+		at NJIT	W 88–59	16–14 (8–7)	Wellness and Events Center (613); Newark, NJ
March 4, 2025; 7:00 p.m., ESPN+		at Vermont	L 71–79	16–15 (8–8)	Patrick Gym (2,404); Burlington, VT
America East tournament
March 8, 2025; 7:00 p.m., ESPN+	(4)	(5) Binghamton; Quarterfinals	W 69–66	17–15	Broadview Center (1,667); Albany, NY
March 11, 2025; 9:00 p.m., ESPN2	(4)	at (1) Bryant; Semifinals	L 78–91	17–16	Chace Athletic Center (1,001); Smithfield, RI
*Non-conference game. ^{#}Rankings from AP poll. (#) Tournament seedings in parentheses. All times are in Eastern.
