= 2024–25 Vermont Catamounts men's basketball team =

American college basketball season

2024–25 Vermont Catamounts men's basketball
- Conference: America East Conference
- Record: 21–12 (13–3 America East)
- Head coach: John Becker (14th season)
- Associate head coach: Ryan Schneider
- Assistant coaches: Nathan Johnson; Derryk O'Grady
- Home arena: Patrick Gym

2024–25 America East Conference men's basketball standings
	Conf.				Overall
Team	W		L	PCT	W		L	PCT
Bryant †	14	–	2	.875	23	–	12	.657
Vermont	13	–	3	.813	21	–	12	.636
Maine	10	–	6	.625	20	–	14	.588
Albany	8	–	8	.500	17	–	16	.515
Binghamton	7	–	9	.438	15	–	17	.469
UMass Lowell	6	–	10	.375	17	–	15	.531
New Hampshire	6	–	10	.375	8	–	24	.250
UMBC	5	–	11	.313	13	–	19	.406
NJIT	3	–	13	.188	6	–	25	.194
† 2025 AmEast tournament winner

The 2024–25 Vermont Catamounts men's basketball team represented the University of Vermont during the 2024–25 NCAA Division I men's basketball season. The Catamounts, led by 14th-year head coach John Becker, played their home games at the Patrick Gym located in Burlington, Vermont as members of the America East Conference. For the first time since 2021, Vermont failed to qualify for the NCAA Tournament as they were defeated by Maine in the semifinals of the America East tournament.

== Previous season ==
The Catamounts finished the 2023–24 season 28–7, 15–1 in America East play to finish as America East regular season champions. They defeated Albany, New Hampshire, and UMass Lowell to win their third straight America East tournament championship and earn the conference's automatic bid to the NCAA tournament. They received the #13 seed in the South Region, where they would fall to #4 region seed Duke in the First Round.

== Roster ==
2024–25 Vermont Catamounts men's basketball team
Players
Coaches

Pos.	#	Name	Height	Weight	Year	Previous school	Hometown
F	0	Ileri Ayo-Faleye	6 ft 8 in (2.03 m)	210 lb (95 kg)	RS Sr	Rhode Island	Lebanon, PA
G	1	Gavin Perryman	6 ft 1 in (1.85 m)	190 lb (86 kg)	GS	Texas	Dallas, TX
G	2	Sam Alamutu	6 ft 5 in (1.96 m)	215 lb (98 kg)	RS Jr	Rothesay Netherwood School	Ajax, ON
G	3	TJ Hurley	6 ft 5 in (1.96 m)	190 lb (86 kg)	Jr	The Rock School	Pelham, ON
G	4	Ben Wesson	6 ft 4 in (1.93 m)	170 lb (77 kg)	Fr	Albemarle High School	Charlottesville, VA
G	5	Sean Blake	6 ft 2 in (1.88 m)	160 lb (73 kg)	Fr	Royal Crown Academy	Mississauga, ON
G	12	Shamir Bogues	6 ft 4 in (1.93 m)	190 lb (86 kg)	Sr	Tarleton State	Killeen, TX
G	13	Jace Roquemore	6 ft 5 in (1.96 m)	170 lb (77 kg)	GS	UC San Diego	Henderson, NV
F	15	Drew Bessette	6 ft 8 in (2.03 m)	225 lb (102 kg)	Fr	Rice Memorial High School	Milton, VT
G	20	TJ Long	6 ft 4 in (1.93 m)	195 lb (88 kg)	Sr	Fairfield	Rockville Centre, NY
F	21	Seth Joba	6 ft 9 in (2.06 m)	225 lb (102 kg)	So	Bridgton Academy	Orchard Park, NY
F	24	Shy Odom	6 ft 6 in (1.98 m)	230 lb (104 kg)	Jr	Howard	Calabasas, CA
G	25	Sincere Clemons	6 ft 2 in (1.88 m)	170 lb (77 kg)	Fr	Northfield Mount Hermon School	Ithaca, NY
F	32	Nick Fiorillo	6 ft 8 in (2.03 m)	225 lb (102 kg)	GS	Scarborough High School	Scarborough, ME
F	34	Noah Barnett	6 ft 9 in (2.06 m)	205 lb (93 kg)	So	Don Bosco Prep	Poughkeepsie, NY

Head coach

- John Becker (Catholic)

Assistant coach(es)

- Ryan Schneider (Marist)
- Nathan Johnson (St. Francis Xavier)
- Derryk O'Grady (Vermont)

Legend

- (C) Team captain
- (S) Suspended
- (I) Ineligible
- (W) Walk-on
- Injured
- Current redshirt

Roster
Last update: October 9, 2024

== Schedule and results ==
Date time, TV	Rank^{#}	Opponent^{#}	Result	Record	Site (attendance) city, state
Exhibition
October 26, 2024*; 1:00 pm		Saint Anselm	W 68–66	–	Patrick Gym; Burlington, VT
October 30, 2024*; 7:00 pm		Saint Michael's	W 80–55	–	Patrick Gym; Burlington, VT
Non-conference regular season
November 4, 2024*; 6:30 pm, ESPN+		at UAB	W 67–62	1–0	Bartow Arena (3,876); Birmingham, AL
November 6, 2024*; 8:00 p.m., SECN+		at No. 11 Auburn	L 43–94	1–1	Neville Arena (9,121); Auburn, AL
November 9, 2024*; 7:00 pm, ESPN+		at Merrimack	L 51–65	1–2	Lawler Arena (1,747); North Andover, MA
November 15, 2024*; 7:00 pm, ESPN+		at Iona	L 59–62	1–3	Hynes Athletics Center (2,200); New Rochelle, NY
November 19, 2024*; 7:00 pm, ESPN+		Buffalo	W 78–67	2–3	Patrick Gym (2,227); Burlington, VT
November 23, 2024*; 12:00 pm, ESPN+		vs. Delaware; Hall of Fame Tip-Off	W 75–71	3–3	Mohegan Sun Arena; Uncasville, CT
November 24, 2024*; 1:00 pm, ESPN+		vs. Fairfield; Hall of Fame Tip-Off	L 66–67	3–4	Mohegan Sun Arena; Uncasville, CT
November 27, 2024*; 7:00 pm, ESPN+		Plattsburgh State	W 78–55	4–4	Patrick Gym (1,918); Burlington, VT
November 30, 2024*; 1:00 pm, ESPN+		Northeastern	W 68–64	5–4	Patrick Gym (2,316); Burlington, VT
December 3, 2024*; 7:00 pm, ESPN+		Brown	L 53–60	5–5	Patrick Gym (2,111); Burlington, VT
December 7, 2024*; 2:00 pm, ESPN+		at Yale	L 50–65	5–6	John J. Lee Amphitheater (1,242); New Haven, CT
December 15, 2024*; 2:00 pm, ESPN+		at Colgate	L 60–65	5–7	Cotterell Court (653); Hamilton, NY
December 18, 2024*; 7:00 pm, ESPN+		Miami (OH)	W 75–67	6–7	Patrick Gym (2,065); Burlington, VT
December 21, 2024*; 12:00 pm, ESPN+		at Dartmouth	L 54–84	6–8	Leede Arena (1,127); Hanover, NH
December 30, 2024*; 7:00 pm, ESPN+		Elms	W 121–37	7–8	Patrick Gym (2,136); Burlington, VT
America East regular season
January 4, 2025; 1:00 pm, ESPN+		at New Hampshire	W 60–40	8–8 (1–0)	Lundholm Gym (840); Durham, NH
January 9, 2025; 6:00 pm, ESPN+		at UMass Lowell	W 67–63	9–8 (2–0)	Costello Athletic Center (957); Lowell, MA
January 11, 2025; 2:00 pm, ESPN+		at Bryant	L 53–73	9–9 (2–1)	Chace Athletic Center (827); Smithfield, RI
January 16, 2025; 7:00 pm, ESPN+		Binghamton	W 72–64	10–9 (3–1)	Patrick Gym (2,310); Burlington, VT
January 23, 2025; 7:00 pm, ESPN+		NJIT	W 68–64	11–9 (4–1)	Patrick Gym (2,041); Burlington, VT
January 25, 2025; 1:00 pm, ESPN+		UMBC	L 63–80	11–10 (4–2)	Patrick Gym (2,537); Burlington, VT
January 30, 2025; 6:07 pm, ESPN+		at Binghamton	L 72–75	11–11 (4–3)	Dr. Bai Lee Court (2,429); Vestal, NY
February 1, 2025; 2:00 pm, ESPN+		Maine	W 55–49	12–11 (5–3)	Patrick Gym (2,760); Burlington, VT
February 8, 2025; 7:00 pm, ESPN+		at Albany	W 68–62	13–11 (6–3)	Broadview Center (2,315); Albany, NY
February 13, 2025; 7:00 pm, ESPN+		New Hampshire	W 79–59	14–11 (7–3)	Patrick Gym; Burlington, VT
February 15, 2025; 2:00 pm, ESPN+		at Maine	W 65–61	15–11 (8–3)	Memorial Gymnasium (1,290); Orono, ME
February 20, 2025; 7:00 pm, ESPN+		Bryant	W 59–55	16–11 (9–3)	Patrick Gym (2,386); Burlington, VT
February 22, 2025; 4:30 pm, ESPN+		UMass Lowell	W 85–61	17–11 (10–3)	Patrick Gym (2,819); Burlington, VT
February 27, 2025; 7:00 pm, ESPN+		at NJIT	W 71–61	18–11 (11–3)	Wellness and Events Center (612); Newark, NJ
March 1, 2025; 1:00 pm, ESPN+		at UMBC	W 79–69	19–11 (12–3)	Chesapeake Employers Insurance Arena (2,066); Catonsville, MD
March 4, 2025; 7:00 pm, ESPN+		Albany	W 79–71	20–11 (13–3)	Patrick Gym (2,404); Burlington, VT
America East tournament
March 8, 2025; 3:00 pm, ESPN+	(2)	(7) New Hampshire; Quarterfinals	W 64–57	21–11	Patrick Gym (2,102); Burlington, VT
March 11, 2025; 7:00 pm, ESPN+	(2)	(3) Maine; Semifinals	L 42–57	21–12	Patrick Gym (2,071); Burlington, VT
*Non-conference game. ^{#}Rankings from AP Poll. (#) Tournament seedings in parentheses. All times are in Eastern.
