= 2025 America East men's basketball tournament =

American college basketball postseason tournament

- Classification: Division I
- Season: 2024–25
- Teams: 8
- Site: Campus sites
- Finals site: Chace Athletic Center; Smithfield, RI
- Champions: Bryant (1st title)
- Winning coach: Phil Martelli Jr. (1st title)
- MVP: Earl Timberlake (Bryant)
- Attendance: 10,666 (total); 1,538 (championship)
- Television: ESPN+ ESPN2

2024–25 America East Conference men's basketball standings
	Conf.				Overall
Team	W		L	PCT	W		L	PCT
Bryant †	14	–	2	.875	23	–	12	.657
Vermont	13	–	3	.813	21	–	12	.636
Maine	10	–	6	.625	20	–	14	.588
Albany	8	–	8	.500	17	–	16	.515
Binghamton	7	–	9	.438	15	–	17	.469
UMass Lowell	6	–	10	.375	17	–	15	.531
New Hampshire	6	–	10	.375	8	–	24	.250
UMBC	5	–	11	.313	13	–	19	.406
NJIT	3	–	13	.188	6	–	25	.194
† 2025 AmEast tournament winner

The 2025 America East Men's Basketball Conference tournament was the postseason men's basketball tournament for the America East Conference. It was held March 8–15, 2025, at campus sites of the higher seeds. The winner, Bryant, received the conference's automatic bid to the 2025 NCAA Tournament. The tournament was sponsored by Jersey Mike's Subs and was officially known as the 2025 Jersey Mike's America East Men's Basketball Playoffs.

== Seeds ==
Eight of the nine America East teams qualified for the tournament. The teams were seeded by record in conference, with a tiebreaker system to seed teams with identical conference records.

Seed	School	AEC Record	Tiebreaker
1	Bryant	14–2	
2	Vermont	13–3	
3	Maine	10–6	
4	Albany	8–8	
5	Binghamton	7–9	
6	UMass Lowell	6–10	NET Ranking of 237
7	New Hampshire	6–10	NET Ranking of 351
8	UMBC	5–11	
DNQ	NJIT	3–13	

== Schedule ==
Game	Time*	Matchup^{#}	Score	Television
Quarterfinals – Saturday, March 8
1	3:00 p.m.	No. 7 New Hampshire at No. 2 Vermont	57–64	ESPN+
2	4:00 p.m.	No. 8 UMBC at No. 1 Bryant	74–85	ESPN+
3	6:00 p.m.	No. 6 UMass Lowell at No. 3 Maine	64–72	ESPN+
4	7:00 p.m.	No. 5 Binghamton at No. 4 Albany	66–69	ESPN+
Semifinals – Tuesday, March 11
5	7:00 p.m.	No. 3 Maine at No. 2 Vermont	57–42	ESPN+
6	9:00 p.m.	No. 4 Albany at No. 1 Bryant	78–91	ESPN2
Championship – Saturday, March 15
7	11:00 am	No. 3 Maine at No. 1 Bryant	59–77	ESPN2
*Game times in EST for the quarterfinals and EDT for the semifinals and championship. #-Rankings denote tournament seeding.

== Bracket ==
Quarterfinals; Saturday, March 8, 2025; ESPN+
1	Bryant	85
8	UMBC	74
4	Albany	69
5	Binghamton	66
(Pairings are reseeded after the first round)
2	Vermont	64
7	New Hampshire	57
3	Maine	72
6	UMass Lowell	64

Semifinals; Tuesday, March 11, 2025; ESPN2/ESPN+
1	Bryant	91
4	Albany	78
2	Vermont	42
3	Maine	57

Championship; Saturday, March 15, 2025; ESPN2
1	Bryant	77
3	Maine	59

== Game summaries ==
All times are in Eastern Time (UTC−5 on March 8 and UTC−4 on March 11 and 15)

=== Quarterfinals ===
ESPN+

March 8
3:00 p.m.

Box

No. 7 New Hampshire 57, No. 2 Vermont 64
Scoring by half: 34–26, 23–38
Pts: Badru 18; Rebs: Okpomo 6 Asts: Poser, Pissis 3	Pts: Hurley 18; Rebs: Ayo-Faleye 10; Asts: Fiorillo 4
Vermont advances to the America East Semifinals

Roy L. Patrick Gymnasium
Burlington, VT
Attendance: 2,102
Referees: Tommy Deneen, Carl Luciano, Adam Vandenburgh

ESPN+

March 8
4:00 p.m.

Box

No. 8 UMBC 74, No.1 Bryant 85
Scoring by half: 31–41, 43–44
Pts: Banks 24; Rebs: Banks 9 Asts: Valentine 3	Pts: Pinzon 22; Rebs: Cramer 12; Asts: Timberlake 8
Bryant advances to the America East Semifinals

Chace Athletic Center
Smithfield, RI
Attendance: 1,005
Referees: Brandon Cruz, Ryan Corbett, Mike Nardone

ESPN+

March 8
6:00 p.m.

Box

No. 6 UMass Lowell 64, No. 3 Maine 72
Scoring by half: 29–34, 35–38
Pts: Brooks 25; Rebs: Brooks 10; Asts: Covington 4	Pts: Tynes 20; Rebs: Tynes 5 Asts: Tynes 6
Maine advances to the America East Semifinals

Cross Insurance Center
Bangor, ME
Attendance: 1,282
Referees: Mike Evans, John Cahill Jr., Vasili Mallios

ESPN+

March 8
7:00 p.m.

Box

No. 5 Binghamton 66, No. 4 Albany 69
Scoring by half: 30–39, 36–30
Pts: Benson 19; Rebs: Walsh 9 Asts: Walsh 4	Pts: Marshall 20; Rebs: Langford Jr. 11; Asts: Lindsey 3
Albany advances to the America East Semifinals

Broadview Center
Albany, NY
Attendance: 1,667
Referees: Dan Basile, Jason Bradwell, Will Flowers

=== Semifinals ===
ESPN+

March 11
7:00 p.m.

Box

No. 3 Maine 57, No. 2 Vermont 42
Scoring by half: 27–19, 30–23
Pts: Lopez 14; Rebs: Tynes 13; Asts: Clayton, Burns, Carey 2	Pts: Ayo-Faleye 14; Rebs: Alamutu 21; Asts: Alamutu 3
Maine advances to the America East Finals

Roy L. Patrick Gymnasium
Burlington, VT
Attendance: 2,071
Referees: Tim Smith, Jason Bradwell, Ryan Corbett

ESPN2

March 11
9:00 p.m.

Box

No. 4 Albany 71, No. 1 Bryant 91
Scoring by half: 33-39, 45-52
Pts: Marshall 23; Rebs: Klaczek 12; Asts: Joshua, Klaczek 3	Pts: Timberlake, Mitchell 21; Rebs: Mitchell 13; Asts: Withers 9
Bryant advances to the America East Finals

Chace Athletic Center
Smithfield, RI
Attendance: 1,001
Referees: Will Flowers, John Cahill Jr., Nathan Hall

=== Finals ===
ESPN2

March 15
11:00 a.m.

Box

No. 3 Maine 59, No. 1 Bryant 77
Scoring by half: 27–38, 32–39
Pts: Lopez 20; Rebs: Steele 8 Asts: Tynes 6	Pts: Evans 19; Rebs: Mitchell 12; Asts: Withers, Timberlake 5
Bryant wins America East Finals

Chace Athletic Center
Smithfield, RI
Attendance: 1,538
Referees: Mike Evans, Adam Vandenburgh, Vasili Mallios

== See also ==
- America East Conference men's basketball tournament
- 2025 America East women's basketball tournament
