= 2024–25 Binghamton Bearcats men's basketball team =

American college basketball season

2024–25 Binghamton Bearcats men's basketball
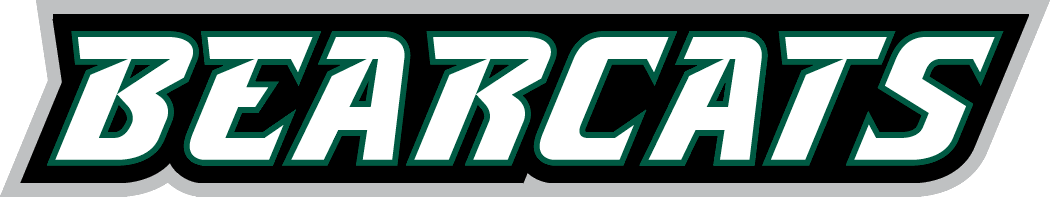
- Conference: America East Conference
- Record: 15–17 (7–9 America East)
- Head coach: Levell Sanders (4th season)
- Associate head coach: Brian Johnson
- Assistant coaches: Marlon Guild; Patrick Norris
- Home arena: Dr. Bai Lee Court

2024–25 America East Conference men's basketball standings
	Conf.				Overall
Team	W		L	PCT	W		L	PCT
Bryant †	14	–	2	.875	23	–	12	.657
Vermont	13	–	3	.813	21	–	12	.636
Maine	10	–	6	.625	20	–	14	.588
Albany	8	–	8	.500	17	–	16	.515
Binghamton	7	–	9	.438	15	–	17	.469
UMass Lowell	6	–	10	.375	17	–	15	.531
New Hampshire	6	–	10	.375	8	–	24	.250
UMBC	5	–	11	.313	13	–	19	.406
NJIT	3	–	13	.188	6	–	25	.194
† 2025 AmEast tournament winner

The 2024–25 Binghamton Bearcats men's basketball team represented Binghamton University during the 2024–25 NCAA Division I men's basketball season. The Bearcats, led by fourth-year head coach Levell Sanders, played their home games on Dr. Bai Lee Court in Binghamton University Events Center in Vestal, New York as members of the America East Conference.

== Previous season ==
The Bearcats finished the 2023–24 season 15–15, 7–9 in America East play to finish in a three-way tie for fourth place. They were defeated by New Hampshire in the quarterfinals of the America East tournament.

== Roster ==
2024–25 Binghamton Bearcats men's basketball team
Players
Coaches

Pos.	#	Name	Height	Weight	Year	Previous school	Hometown
G	0	Tymu Chenery	6 ft 6 in (1.98 m)	195 lb (88 kg)	GS	Quinnipiac	Philadelphia, Pennsylvania
G	1	Jayden Lemond	6 ft 4 in (1.93 m)	185 lb (84 kg)	So	William & Mary	Marietta, Georgia
G	2	Robby Phillips	6 ft 5 in (1.96 m)	205 lb (93 kg)	Sr	Fairleigh Dickinson	Ridgewood, New Jersey
G	3	Evan Ashe	6 ft 3 in (1.91 m)	190 lb (86 kg)	So	The Winchendon School	Charlotte, North Carolina
G	4	Masud Stewart	6 ft 1 in (1.85 m)	190 lb (86 kg)	Jr	Neumann Goretti High School	Philadelphia, Pennsylvania
F	5	Nehemiah Benson	6 ft 7 in (2.01 m)	215 lb (98 kg)	Sr	Lutheran High School East	Streetsboro, Ohio
G	10	Chris Walker	6 ft 6 in (1.98 m)	195 lb (88 kg)	RS Jr	Little Rock	West Palm Beach, Florida
G	13	Dominic Capriotti	6 ft 3 in (1.91 m)	185 lb (84 kg)	RS So	Houston Christian	Tempe, Arizona
F	15	Stephan Snagg	6 ft 7 in (2.01 m)	190 lb (86 kg)	RS Fr	New Hampton School	Queens, New York
F/C	21	Ben Callahan-Gold	6 ft 8 in (2.03 m)	220 lb (100 kg)	GS	Trinity College	New York, New York
F	22	Gavin Walsh	6 ft 8 in (2.03 m)	225 lb (102 kg)	So	Loyola Blakefield	Baltimore, Maryland
G	23	Wes Peterson Jr.	6 ft 6 in (1.98 m)	205 lb (93 kg)	Sr	Delaware	Alexandria, Virginia
G	24	Jackson Benigni	6 ft 1 in (1.85 m)	180 lb (82 kg)	GS	Stonehill	East Hampton, Connecticut
G	35	Max Sims	6 ft 5 in (1.96 m)	190 lb (86 kg)	So	IMG Academy	Tampa, Florida

Head coach

- Levell Sanders (Seton Hall)

Assistant coach(es)

- Brian Johnson (Delaware)
- Marlon Guild (Hartford)
- Patrick Norris (Notre Dame)

Legend

- (C) Team captain
- (S) Suspended
- (I) Ineligible
- (W) Walk-on
- Injured
- Current redshirt

Roster
Last update: October 6, 2024

== Schedule and results ==
Date time, TV	Rank^{#}	Opponent^{#}	Result	Record	Site (attendance) city, state
Exhibition
October 30, 2024*; 6:07 pm		Queens College	W 83–70	–	Dr. Bai Lee Court (1,021); Vestal, NY
Non-conference regular season
November 4, 2024*; 7:30 pm, BTN+		at Penn State	L 66–108	0–1	Bryce Jordan Center (7,687); University Park, PA
November 7, 2024*; 5:00 pm, ESPN+		Oneonta	W 82–63	1–1	Dr. Bai Lee Court (1,473); Vestal, NY
November 10, 2024*; 2:00 pm, ACCNX/ESPN+		at Miami (FL)	L 64–88	1–2	Watsco Center (5,701); Coral Gables, FL
November 12, 2024*; 7:00 pm, ESPN+		at Fordham	L 63–78	1–3	Rose Hill Gymnasium (1,349); Bronx, NY
November 16, 2024*; 2:00 pm, ESPN+		Misericordia	W 77–48	2–3	Dr. Bai Lee Court (1,323); Vestal, NY
November 19, 2024*; 6:07 pm, ESPN+		Longwood	L 60–66	2–4	Dr. Bai Lee Court (1,283); Vestal, NY
November 24, 2024*; 1:00 pm, NEC Front Row		at Central Connecticut	L 56–64	2–5	William H. Detrick Gymnasium (888); New Britain, CT
November 29, 2024*; 2:00 pm, ESPN+		vs. Niagara; Lafayette Tournament	L 62–65	2–6	Kirby Sports Center (329); Easton, PA
November 30, 2024*; 2:00 pm, ESPN+		vs. LIU; Lafayette Tournament	W 75–70 ^{OT}	3–6	Kirby Sports Center (237); Easton, PA
December 1, 2024*; 2:30 pm, ESPN+		at Lafayette; Lafayette Tournament	W 82–81 ^{OT}	4–6	Kirby Sports Center (873); Easton, PA
December 7, 2024*; 6:00 pm, NEC Front Row		at Le Moyne	W 72–62	5–6	Ted Grant Court (1,162); DeWitt, NY
December 15, 2024*; 2:00 pm, ESPN+		Lancaster Bible	W 85–60	6–6	Dr. Bai Lee Court (1,053); Vestal, NY
December 18, 2024*; 5:00 pm, ESPN+		Mercyhurst	W 62–60	7–6	Dr. Bai Lee Court (2,008); Vestal, NY
December 22, 2024*; 1:00 pm, ESPN+		at Army	W 78–68	8–6	Christl Arena (455); West Point, NY
December 29, 2024*; 2:00 pm, ESPN+		at Marist	L 51–69	8–7	McCann Arena (2,059); Poughkeepsie, NY
America East regular season
January 4, 2025; 2:00 pm, ESPN+		UMBC	W 87–82	9–7 (1–0)	Dr. Bai Lee Court (1,812); Vestal, NY
January 9, 2025; 6:00 pm, ESPN+		at Maine	L 71–82	9–8 (1–1)	Memorial Gymnasium (508); Orono, ME
January 11, 2025; 1:00 pm, ESPN+		at New Hampshire	L 72–79	9–9 (1–2)	Lundholm Gym (417); Durham, NH
January 16, 2025; 7:00 pm, ESPN+		at Vermont	L 64–72	9–10 (1–3)	Patrick Gym (2,310); Burlington, VT
January 18, 2025; 2:00 pm, ESPN+		Albany	L 65–70	9–11 (1–4)	Dr. Bai Lee Court (2,162); Vestal, NY
January 25, 2025; 4:00 pm, ESPN+		at Bryant	L 69–83	9–12 (1–5)	Chace Athletic Center (973); Smithfield, RI
January 30, 2025; 6:07 pm, ESPN+		Vermont	W 75–72	10–12 (2–5)	Dr. Bai Lee Court (2,429); Vestal, NY
February 1, 2025; 7:00 pm, ESPN+		at Albany	W 65–61	11–12 (3–5)	Broadview Center (2,625); Albany, NY
February 6, 2025; 6:07 pm, ESPN+		UMass Lowell	W 66–54	12–12 (4–5)	Dr. Bai Lee Court (2,163); Vestal, NY
February 8, 2025; 2:00 pm, ESPN+		Bryant	L 71–78	12–13 (4–6)	Dr. Bai Lee Court (3,048); Vestal, NY
February 13, 2025; 6:00 pm, ESPN+		at UMBC	L 77–81	12–14 (4–7)	Chesapeake Employers Insurance Arena (1,257); Catonsville, MD
February 15, 2025; 2:00 pm, ESPN+		at NJIT	W 75–71 ^{OT}	13–14 (5–7)	Wellness and Events Center (492); Newark, NJ
February 20, 2025; 6:07 pm, ESPN+		New Hampshire	W 79–60	14–14 (6–7)	Dr. Bai Lee Court (2,018); Vestal, NY
February 22, 2025; 2:00 pm, ESPN+		Maine	W 71–69	15–14 (7–7)	Dr. Bai Lee Court (2,394); Vestal, NY
March 1, 2025; 1:00 pm, ESPN+		at UMass Lowell	L 53–79	15–15 (7–8)	Costello Athletic Center (755); Lowell, MA
March 4, 2025; 6:07 pm, ESPN+		NJIT	L 72–75	15–16 (7–9)	Dr. Bai Lee Court (2,867); Vestal, NY
America East tournament
March 8, 2025; 7:00 pm, ESPN+	(5)	at (4) Albany; Quarterfinals	L 66–69	15–17	Broadview Center (1,667); Albany, NY
*Non-conference game. ^{#}Rankings from AP Poll. (#) Tournament seedings in parentheses. All times are in Eastern.
