= 2024–25 New Hampshire Wildcats men's basketball team =

American college basketball season

2024–25 New Hampshire Wildcats men's basketball
- Conference: America East Conference
- Record: 8–24 (6–10 America East)
- Head coach: Nathan Davis (2nd season)
- Assistant coaches: Tyler Wilson; Luis Guzman; Matt Miller; Kevin Nichols
- Home arena: Lundholm Gym

2024–25 America East Conference men's basketball standings
	Conf.				Overall
Team	W		L	PCT	W		L	PCT
Bryant †	14	–	2	.875	23	–	12	.657
Vermont	13	–	3	.813	21	–	12	.636
Maine	10	–	6	.625	20	–	14	.588
Albany	8	–	8	.500	17	–	16	.515
Binghamton	7	–	9	.438	15	–	17	.469
UMass Lowell	6	–	10	.375	17	–	15	.531
New Hampshire	6	–	10	.375	8	–	24	.250
UMBC	5	–	11	.313	13	–	19	.406
NJIT	3	–	13	.188	6	–	25	.194
† 2025 AmEast tournament winner

The 2024–25 New Hampshire Wildcats men's basketball team represented the University of New Hampshire during the 2024–25 NCAA Division I men's basketball season. The Wildcats, led by second-year head coach Nathan Davis, played their home games at the Lundholm Gym located in Durham, New Hampshire as members of the America East Conference.

The Wildcats finished the season 8–24, 6–10 in America East play, to finish in a tie for sixth place. They lost in the quarterfinals of the America East tournament to second-seeded Vermont.

== Previous season ==
The Wildcats finished the 2023–24 season 16–15, 7–9 in America East play, to finish in a three-way tie for fourth place. They defeated Binghamton in the quarterfinals of the America East tournament before falling to top-seeded and eventual tournament champions Vermont in the semifinals.

== Roster ==
2024–25 New Hampshire Wildcats men's basketball team
Players
Coaches

Pos.	#	Name	Height	Weight	Year	Previous school	Hometown
G	0	Sami Pissis	6 ft 3 in (1.91 m)	190 lb (86 kg)	Jr	Southeastern Louisiana	Paris, France
G	2	Jawarie Hamelin	6 ft 2 in (1.88 m)	175 lb (79 kg)	Jr	Monroe College	Westerly, RI
F	3	Dylan Saunders	6 ft 8 in (2.03 m)	202 lb (92 kg)	So	Iona	Roanoke, VA
G	4	Khalil Badru	6 ft 5 in (1.96 m)	192 lb (87 kg)	Fr	The Newman School	New Britain, CT
C	5	Caleb Middleton	6 ft 11 in (2.11 m)	215 lb (98 kg)	Fr	Brewster Academy	Dover, NH
G	10	Anthony III McComb	6 ft 3 in (1.91 m)	182 lb (83 kg)	Jr	Bowling Green	Dayton, OH
G	11	Nicholas Sanford	6 ft 1 in (1.85 m)	178 lb (81 kg)	Fr	Brophy College Prep	Phoenix, AZ
F	12	Giancarlo Bastianoni	6 ft 7 in (2.01 m)	205 lb (93 kg)	Sr	Presbyterian	Puerto Plata, Dominican Republic
G	13	Rex Sunderland	6 ft 4 in (1.93 m)	198 lb (90 kg)	Jr	Davis High School	Kaysville, UT
G	14	Antoni Siewruk	6 ft 9 in (2.06 m)	193 lb (88 kg)	Fr	Sms Pzkosz	Koszalin, Poland
F	15	Davide Poser	6 ft 4 in (1.93 m)	206 lb (93 kg)	So	Bernareggio	Veneto, Italy
F/C	21	Emmanuel Okpomo	6 ft 9 in (2.06 m)	227 lb (103 kg)	GS	Temple	Delta State, Nigeria
G	22	Domenic Malvey	6 ft 0 in (1.83 m)	175 lb (79 kg)	So	Franklin Pierce	Newton, NH
F	24	Jon O'Neill	6 ft 9 in (2.06 m)	216 lb (98 kg)	Fr	Kaukauna High School	Kaukauna, WI
F	33	Trey Woodyard	6 ft 6 in (1.98 m)	196 lb (89 kg)	Sr	Valparaiso	London, OH

Head coach

- Nathan Davis (Randolph–Macon)

Assistant coach(es)

- Tyler Wilson (Manhattan)
- Luis Guzman (Temple)
- Matt Miller (St. Mary's (MD))
- Kevin Nichols (Louisville)

Legend

- (C) Team captain
- (S) Suspended
- (I) Ineligible
- (W) Walk-on
- Injured
- Current redshirt

Roster
Last update: October 8, 2024

== Schedule and results ==
Date time, TV	Rank^{#}	Opponent^{#}	Result	Record	Site (attendance) city, state
Non-conference regular season
November 4, 2024*; 7:00 p.m., NESN		at UMass	L 74–103	0–1	Mullins Center (3,147); Amherst, MA
November 6, 2024*; 7:00 p.m., ESPN+		UMass Boston	W 99–69	1–1	Lundholm Gym (438); Durham, NH
November 9, 2024*; 8:00 p.m., FS2		at No. 3 UConn	L 53–92	1–2	XL Center (15,684); Hartford, CT
November 12, 2024*; 7:00 p.m., ESPN+		Fairfield	L 56–62	1–3	Lundholm Gym (204); Durham, NH
November 15, 2024*; 7:00 p.m., ESPN+		at Brown; College Hill Classic	L 58–76	1–4	Pizzitola Sports Center (631); Providence, RI
November 16, 2024*; 4:30 p.m., ESPN+		vs. Sacred Heart; College Hill Classic	L 63–80	1–5	Pizzitola Sports Center (279); Providence, RI
November 17, 2024*; 2:30 p.m.		vs. Holy Cross; College Hill Classic	L 72–74	1–6	Pizzitola Sports Center (237); Providence, RI
November 20, 2024*; 7:00 p.m., ESPN+		Endicott	W 78–64	2–6	Lundholm Gym (517); Durham, NH
November 23, 2024*; 2:00 p.m., ESPN+		at Marist	L 49–54	2–7	McCann Arena (1,659); Poughkeepsie, NY
November 25, 2024*; 7:00 p.m., ESPN+		at Columbia	L 57–83	2–8	Levien Gymnasium (618); New York, NY
December 1, 2024*; 2:00 p.m., ESPN+		at Fordham	L 61–83	2–9	Rose Hill Gymnasium (1,069); The Bronx, NY
December 3, 2024*; 7:00 p.m., ESPN+		Dartmouth; Rivalry	L 65–69	2–10	Lundholm Gym (438); Durham, NH
December 8, 2024*; 1:00 p.m., ESPN+		Harvard	L 62–72	2–11	Lundholm Gym (446); Durham, NH
December 22, 2024*; 1:00 p.m., NEC Front Row		at Stonehill	L 83–90	2–12	Merkert Gymnasium (390); Easton, MA
December 30, 2024*; 6:00 p.m., BTN		at Iowa	L 70–112	2–13	Carver–Hawkeye Arena (10,289); Iowa City, IA
America East regular season
January 4, 2025; 1:00 p.m., ESPN+		Vermont	L 40–60	2–14 (0–1)	Lundholm Gym (840); Durham, NH
January 9, 2025; 7:00 p.m., ESPN+		Albany	L 57–61	2–15 (0–2)	Lundholm Gym (172); Durham, NH
January 11, 2025; 1:00 p.m., ESPN+		Binghamton	W 79–72	3–15 (1–2)	Lundholm Gym (417); Durham, NH
January 16, 2025; 6:00 p.m., ESPN+		at UMBC	W 79–76	4–15 (2–2)	Chesapeake Employers Insurance Arena (1,085); Catonsville, MD
January 18, 2025; 3:00 p.m., ESPN+		at NJIT	L 59–64	4–16 (2–3)	Wellness and Events Center (333); Newark, NJ
January 23, 2025; 7:00 p.m., ESPN+		Bryant	L 76–95	4–17 (2–4)	Lundholm Gym (331); Durham, NH
January 25, 2025; 2:00 p.m., ESPN+		at UMass Lowell	L 80–97	4–18 (2–5)	Costello Athletic Center (845); Lowell, MA
January 30, 2025; 6:00 p.m., ESPN+		at Maine	L 46–71	4–19 (2–6)	Memorial Gymnasium (1,076); Orono, ME
February 6, 2025; 7:00 p.m., ESPN+		UMBC	W 79–78	5–19 (3–6)	Lundholm Gym (241); Durham, NH
February 8, 2025; 1:00 p.m., ESPN+		NJIT	W 80–69	6–19 (4–6)	Lundholm Gym (447); Durham, NH
February 13, 2025; 7:00 p.m., ESPN+		at Vermont	L 59–79	6–20 (4–7)	Patrick Gym; Burlington, VT
February 15, 2025; 1:00 p.m., ESPN+		UMass Lowell	W 80–79	7–20 (5–7)	Lundholm Gym (545); Durham, NH
February 20, 2025; 6:07 p.m., ESPN+		at Binghamton	L 60–79	7–21 (5–8)	Dr. Bai Lee Court (2,018); Vestal, NY
February 22, 2025; 7:00 p.m., ESPN+		at Albany	W 71–60	8–21 (6–8)	Broadview Center (2,280); Albany, NY
February 27, 2025; 7:00 p.m., ESPN+		Maine	L 66–73	8–22 (6–9)	Lundholm Gym (783); Durham, NH
March 4, 2025; 6:00 p.m., ESPN+		at Bryant	L 56–90	8–23 (6–10)	Chace Athletic Center (1,122); Smithfield, RI
America East tournament
March 8, 2025; 3:00 p.m., ESPN+	(7)	at (2) Vermont; Quarterfinals	L 57–64	8–24	Patrick Gym (2,102); Burlington, VT
*Non-conference game. ^{#}Rankings from AP poll. (#) Tournament seedings in parentheses. All times are in Eastern.
