= Grant Billmeier =

American basketball coach

NJIT Highlanders
- Title: Head coach
- League: America East Conference

Personal information
- Born: October 6, 1984 (age 42) Pennington, New Jersey, U.S.
- Listed height: 6 ft 10 in (2.08 m)

Career information
- High school: St. Patrick (Elizabeth, New Jersey)
- College: Seton Hall (2003–2007)
- NBA draft: 2007: undrafted
- Playing career: 2007–2009
- Position: Center
- Coaching career: 2010–present

Career history

Playing
- 2007–2008: s.Oliver Würzburg
- 2008–2009: AD Vagos

Coaching
- 2010–2014: Seton Hall (DBO)
- 2014–2015: Fairleigh Dickinson (assistant)
- 2015–2022: Seton Hall (assistant)
- 2022–2023: Maryland (assistant)
- 2023–present: NJIT

Grant Billmeier (born October 6, 1984) is an American former professional basketball player and current head coach of the NJIT Highlanders men's basketball team.

== Playing career ==
The 6'10" Billmeier played high school basketball at both The Pennington School and St. Patrick before playing college basketball at Seton Hall under Louis Orr and Bobby Gonzalez. He appeared in 106 games for the Pirates.

After graduation, Billmeier played professionally in Germany with s.Oliver Würzburg and in Portugal for AD Vagos.

== Coaching career ==
Billmeier began his coaching career at his alma mater in 2010 as the director of basketball operations under Kevin Willard, a role he served in until 2014 when he joined the coaching staff at Fairleigh Dickinson for a single season. He'd return to Seton Hall as a full assistant coach, where he'd be part of five NCAA tournament squads with the Pirates as well as the 2016 Big East Tournament championship team and 2019–20 Big East regular season co-championship team. When Willard accepted the head coaching position at Maryland, Billmeier joined him as an assistant coach.

On April 5, 2023, Billmeier was named the head coach at NJIT, replacing Brian Kennedy.

== Head coaching record ==
Record table
Season	Team	Overall	Conference	Standing	Postseason
NJIT (America East Conference) (2023–present)
2023–24	NJIT	7–21	3–13	9th	
2024–25	NJIT	6–25	3–13	9th	
2025–26	NJIT	16–17	10–6	3rd	
2026–27	NJIT	1–6	0–0		
NJIT:		30–69 (.303)	16–32 (.333)		
Total:		30–69 (.303)			
National champion Postseason invitational champion Conference regular season champion Conference regular season and conference tournament champion Division regular season champion Division regular season and conference tournament champion Conference tournament champion

== Awards ==
- Robin Cunningham Award for best academics
- Richie Regan Award
- All-State Second Team selection (H.S.)
