= Phil Martelli Jr. =

American basketball player and coach (born 1981)

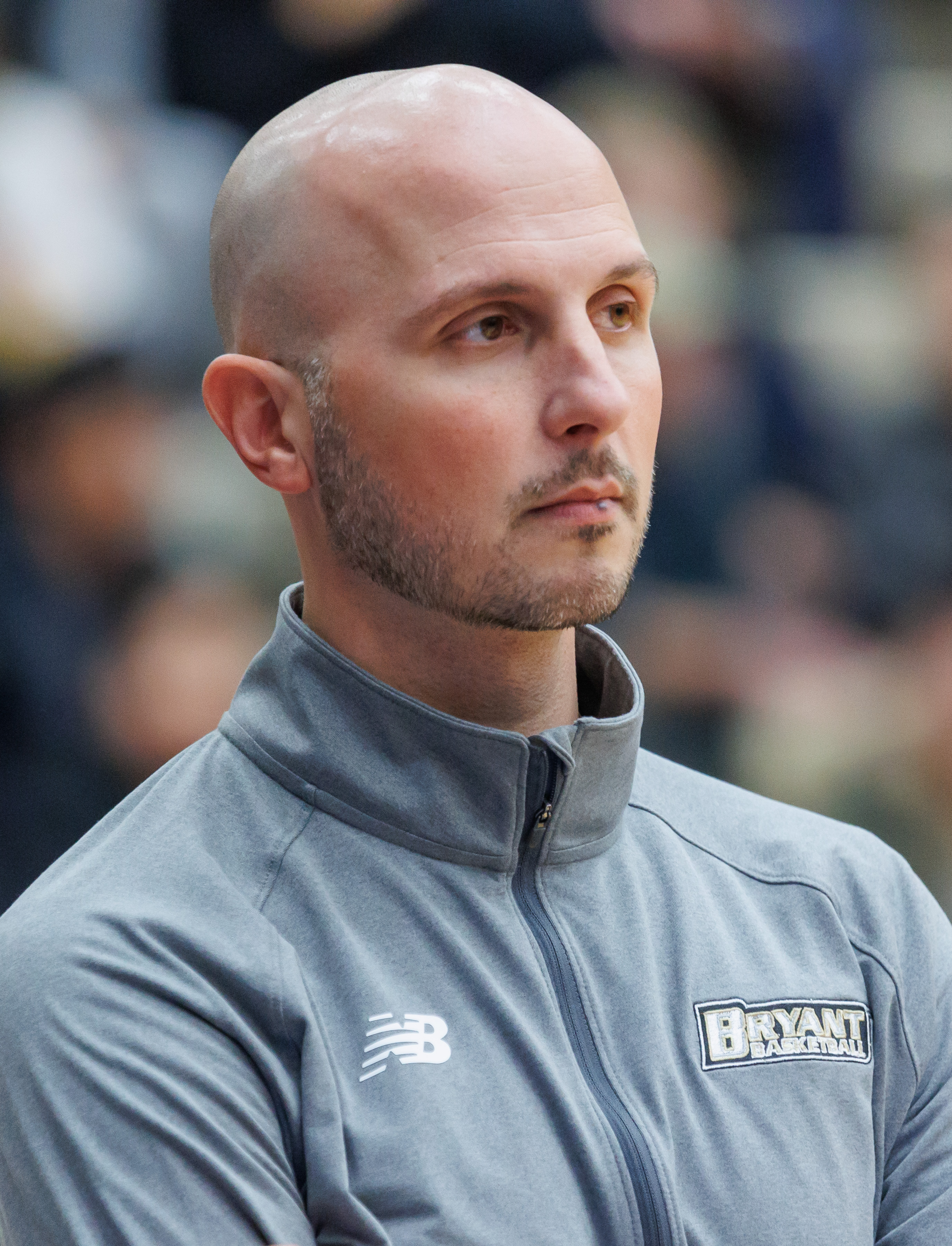

Current position
- Title: Head coach
- Team: VCU
- Conference: Atlantic 10
- Record: 28–8 (.778)

Biographical details
- Born: August 2, 1981 (age 45); Drexel Hill, Pennsylvania, U.S.

Playing career
- 1999–2003: Saint Joseph's

Coaching career (HC unless noted)
- 2003–2005: Central Connecticut (assistant)
- 2005–2006: Manhattan (assistant)
- 2006–2011: Niagara (assistant)
- 2011–2016: Delaware (assistant)
- 2016–2017: Delaware 87ers (assistant)
- 2018–2023: Bryant (associate HC)
- 2023–2025: Bryant
- 2025–present: VCU

Administrative career (AD unless noted)
- 2017–2018: Saint Joseph's (director of program administration)

Head coaching record
- Overall: 71–33 (.683)
- Tournaments: 1–2 (NCAA)

Accomplishments and honors

Championships
- America East regular season (2025); America East tournament (2025); Atlantic 10 regular season (2026); Atlantic 10 tournament (2026)

Awards
- America East Coach of the Year (2025); NABC Mid-Atlantic District Coach of the Year (2025)

Philip Martelli Jr. (born August 2, 1981) is an American college basketball coach, currently serving as the head men's basketball coach of the VCU Rams in the Atlantic 10 Conference.

== Playing career ==
Martelli Jr., an alumnus of Saint Joseph's University (SJU) class of 2003, participated as a four-year player for the Hawks. He was a member of the teams that achieved NCAA tournament appearances in both 2001 and 2003. Serving as a team co-captain alongside Jameer Nelson during the 2002–03 season, Martelli earned his bachelor's degree in marketing from SJU.

== Coaching career ==
Martelli Jr. began his coaching journey in 2003 at Central Connecticut, becoming the youngest full-time assistant coach in Division I at the age of 22. He continued in a similar role at Manhattan in 2005–06. From 2006 to 2011, Martelli served as an assistant coach at Niagara, contributing to the Purple Eagles' 95–69 record over five years, including the 2007 MAAC tournament title and a victory in the NCAA tournament.

Martelli Jr. spent five seasons on the coaching staff at the University of Delaware. During this time, the Blue Hens reached an NCAA tournament appearance in 2014 and set a program-best mark for conference wins over a five-year stretch (55). Martelli's tenure at Delaware saw the development of notable players, including guard Devon Saddler, who set a school record with 2,222 career points.

Martelli Jr.'s experience also includes a stint in the NBA G League with the Delaware 87ers (now Delaware Blue Coats), an affiliate of the Philadelphia 76ers.

Martelli Jr. was tabbed as the associate head coach for Bryant when Jared Grasso took over for Tim O'Shea in 2018. Bryant achieved significant milestones while Martelli Jr. was on the sideline, including winning the 2022 Northeast Conference (NEC) regular-season and tournament titles, leading to the team's first-ever appearance in the NCAA tournament. The 2022–23 season saw the Bulldogs ranking in the top 75 nationally in field goal percentage defense and rebounding margin.

Martelli Jr. served as Bryant's acting head coach for two games to start the 2023–24 season amidst controversy over Grasso's future with the team; Grasso was placed on leave of absence by the school on September 29, then was arrested for hit and run on October 1. Just days after Grasso resigned, Martelli Jr. was named the Bryant head coach on November 15, 2023.

Martelli Jr.'s first season as Bryant's head coach in 2023-2024 saw the Bulldogs achieve a 20–13 overall record and an 11–5 mark in America East Conference play. This marked the first time a Bryant coach had won 20 games in their debut season since 1968–69. For the first time in program history, the Bulldogs reached the semifinal round of the America East tournament. Defensively, Bryant ranked second nationally in blocks per game and ninth in field goal percentage defense. The Bulldogs also picked up a win against Florida Atlantic, ranked 10th nationally at the time; the Owls reached the Final Four in the previous year. For his efforts, Martelli Jr. was named a finalist for the Hugh Durham and Joe B. Hall Awards, which recognize the top mid-major coach & top first-year head coach in Division I college basketball respectively.

In his second season at the helm, Martelli Jr. oversaw an historic season for the Bulldogs. After starting the non-conference schedule 6-9, Bryant went on a 14-2 stretch in America East play, only registering losses to UAlbany and Vermont. Awarded the #1 seed in the conference tournament, Bryant won all three of its America East Championship games, defeating UMBC, UAlbany, and Maine. The Bulldogs earned a #15 seed in the 2025 NCAA tournament, marking the program's second overall appearance in an NCAA tournament game; Bryant fell 87-62 to #2 Michigan State in their lone game of the tournament. Martelli Jr. and the Bulldogs finished the season with a 23-12 record, setting a Division I program record for wins in a single-season. For his efforts, he was named America East Coach of the Year, and NABC Mid-Atlantic District Coach of the Year.

== Personal life ==
Martelli Jr. is the son of Phil Martelli, who spent 24 years as the head coach of Saint Joseph's and five years as the associate head coach at Michigan, and Judy Marra Martelli, a Naismith Hall of Fame inductee.

Martelli Jr. and his wife, Meghan, have three children—a daughter, Marra, and sons Philip and Nathan.

== Head coaching record ==
Record table
Season	Team	Overall	Conference	Standing	Postseason
Bryant Bulldogs (America East Conference) (2023–2025)
2023–24	Bryant	20–13	11–5	3rd	
2024–25	Bryant	23–12	14–2	1st	NCAA Division I Round of 64
Bryant:		43–25 (.632)	25–7 (.781)		
VCU Rams (Atlantic 10 Conference) (2025–present)
2025–26	VCU	28–8	15–3	T–1st	NCAA Division I Round of 32
2026–27	VCU	0–0	0–0		
VCU:		28–8 (.778)	15–3 (.833)		
Total:		71–33 (.683)			
National champion Postseason invitational champion Conference regular season champion Conference regular season and conference tournament champion Division regular season champion Division regular season and conference tournament champion Conference tournament champion
