= Kellen Tynes =

Canadian basketball player (born 2001)

Free agent
- Position: Point guard

Personal information
- Born: September 5, 2001 (age 25) Dartmouth, Nova Scotia, Canada
- Listed height: 6 ft 3 in (1.91 m)
- Listed weight: 175 lb (79 kg)

Career information
- High school: Rothesay Netherwood School (Rothesay, New Brunswick)
- College: Montana State (2020–2022); Maine (2022–2025)
- NBA draft: 2025: undrafted
- Playing career: 2025–present

Career history
- 2026: Delaware Blue Coats
- 2026: Scarborough Shooting Stars

Career highlights
- 2× NCAA steals leader (2023, 2025); Second-team All-America East (2025); 3× America East Defensive Player of the Year (2023–2025)

Kellen Doree Tynes (born September 5, 2001) is a Canadian professional basketball player. He played college basketball for the Maine Black Bears and the Montana State Bobcats.

== Early life and high school ==
Tynes grew up in Nova Scotia and attended Rothesay Netherwood School. As a junior, he led the National Preparatory Association in scoring and steals with 30 points and 5.9 steals per game. Tynes averaged 22.0 points, 7.2 rebounds, 6.1 assists, and 4.7 steals per game as a senior. The season was shortened due to COVID-19, but Tynes was named NPA's Most Valuable Player and Defensive Player of the Year. He committed to play college basketball at Montana State in April 2020.

== College career ==
Tynes played sparingly in two seasons at Montana State but helped the Bobcats reach the NCAA Tournament. After his second season, he transferred to Maine. As a sophomore, Tynes averaged 14.3 points, 4.6 rebounds, 3.8 assists and an NCAA Division 1-leading 3.3 steals per game. He averaged 12.6 points, 3.9 assists, 2.8 rebounds, and 2.2 steals per game as a junior and was a finalist for the Lefty Driesell Award. As a senior, Tynes averaged 12.8 points, 4.75 assists, 3.3 rebounds, and an NCAA Division I-leading 3.1 steals per game, and surpassed Marty Higgins for Maine's all-time steals leader. He was named America East player of the week five times, Second Team All-America East and the all-tournament team. Tynes also earned third straight America East defensive player of the year honors.

== Professional career ==
Tynes went undrafted in the 2025 NBA draft. He worked out with the Motor City Cruise and had some attention from European leagues but was focused on the NBA G League. In January 2026, Tynes signed with the Delaware Blue Coats. In his professional debut, he played four minutes and had an assist against the Noblesville Boom. On April 24, 2026, Tynes signed with the Scarborough Shooting Stars of the Canadian Elite Basketball League.

== National team career ==
In July 2023, Tynes was named to the Canadian National U23 Team that competed in GloblJam 2023,
