= 2026–27 UMass Lowell River Hawks men's basketball team =

American college basketball season

2026–27 UMass Lowell River Hawks men's basketball
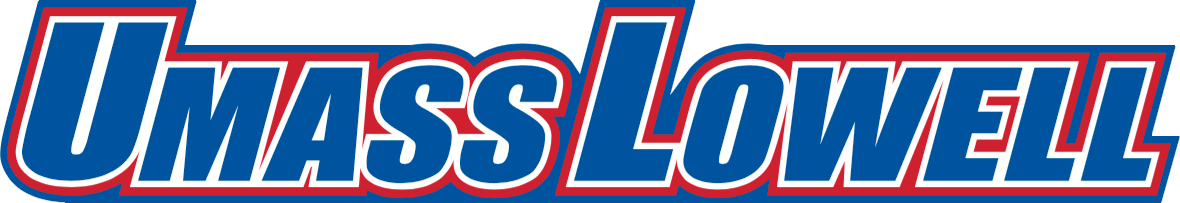
- Conference: America East Conference
- Record: 4–2 (0–0 America East)
- Head coach: Pat Duquette (14th season)
- Associate head coach: Matt Graves
- Assistant coaches: Bryan Dougher; Octavius Hinnant; Nick Schmidt
- Home arena: Kennedy Family Athletic Complex; Tsongas Center

2026–27 America East Conference men's basketball standings
| | Conf. | | | | Overall |
| Team | W | | L | PCT | W | | L | PCT |
|---|---|---|---|---|---|---|---|---|
| UMass Lowell | 0 | – | 0 | – | 4 | – | 1 | .800 |
| Albany | 0 | – | 0 | – | 4 | – | 3 | .571 |
| Binghamton | 0 | – | 0 | – | 4 | – | 3 | .571 |
| New Hampshire | 0 | – | 0 | – | 4 | – | 3 | .571 |
| Vermont | 0 | – | 0 | – | 3 | – | 3 | .500 |
| Bryant | 0 | – | 0 | – | 3 | – | 4 | .429 |
| UMBC | 0 | – | 0 | – | 3 | – | 4 | .429 |
| Maine | 0 | – | 0 | – | 2 | – | 5 | .286 |
| NJIT | 0 | – | 0 | – | 1 | – | 6 | .143 |
† 2027 AmEast tournament winner As of November 22, 2026; Rankings from AP poll

The 2026–27 UMass Lowell River Hawks men's basketball team will represent the University of Massachusetts Lowell during the 2026–27 NCAA Division I men's basketball season. The River Hawks, who will be led by 14th-year head coach Pat Duquette, will play their home games at the Kennedy Family Athletic Complex, with two games at the Tsongas Center, both located in Lowell, Massachusetts, as members of the America East Conference.

== Previous season ==
The River Hawks finished the 2025–26 season 15–18, 9–7 in America East play, to finish in fourth place. As the #4 seed in the America East tournament, they defeated Albany in the quarterfinals, before falling to top-seeded and eventual tournament champions UMBC in the semifinals.

== Preseason ==
On September 28, 2026, the America East Conference released their preseason polls. UMass Lowell was picked to finish seventh in the conference.

=== Preseason rankings ===
America East Preseason Poll
| Place | Team | Votes |
|---|---|---|
| 1 | Vermont | 62 (7) |
| 2 | UMBC | 46 (1) |
| 3 | Binghamton | 45 (1) |
| 4 | NJIT | 38 |
| 5 | Bryant | 36 |
| 6 | Albany | 34 |
| 7 | UMass Lowell | 31 |
| 8 | Maine | 19 |
| 9 | New Hampshire | 13 |
(#) first-place votes

=== Preseason All-America East Team ===
Preseason All-America East Team
| Player | Year | Position |
|---|---|---|
| Victor Okojie | Sophomore | Forward |

== Roster ==
2026–27 UMass Lowell River Hawks men's basketball team
Players
Coaches

| Pos. | # | Name | Height | Weight | Year | Previous school | Hometown |
|---|---|---|---|---|---|---|---|
| G | 0 | Jakai Newton | 6 ft 3 in (1.91 m) | — | Sr | Georgia State | Covington, Georgia |
| G | 1 | Kenyon Giles | 5 ft 11 in (1.8 m) | — | Jr | Florida SouthWestern State College | Cleveland, Ohio |
| G | 2 | Jasiah Cannady | 6 ft 1 in (1.85 m) | — | Fr | Mt. Zion Prep | Prince George's County, Maryland |
| G | 3 | Christian Jones | 5 ft 11 in (1.8 m) | — | So | Siena | Houston, Texas |
| F | 4 | Donovan Hand | 6 ft 6 in (1.98 m) | — | RS Jr | Gordon State College | College Park, Georgia |
| F | 5 | Jayden Harris | 6 ft 6 in (1.98 m) | — | RS So | Eastern Kentucky | Dumfries, Virginia |
| G | 6 | Isaiah Walter | 6 ft 6 in (1.98 m) | 200 lb (91 kg) | RS So | Terror Prep | Central Coast, Australia |
| G/F | 7 | Max Ellis | 6 ft 5 in (1.96 m) | — | Fr | St. John Bosco High School | Long Beach, California |
| F | 8 | Elhadji Diallo | 6 ft 7 in (2.01 m) | — | Fr | Combine Academy | Dakar, Senegal |
| G | 10 | Jaden Flemons | 6 ft 2 in (1.88 m) | — | Fr | TMI Episcopal | San Antonio, Texas |
| F | 15 | Jerrell Roberson II | 6 ft 9 in (2.06 m) | 225 lb (102 kg) | Sr | James Madison | Upper Marlboro, Maryland |
| F | 23 | Victor Okojie | 6 ft 8 in (2.03 m) | 215 lb (98 kg) | So | Hamilton Heights Christian Academy | Castlebar, Ireland |

Head coach

- Pat Duquette (Williams)

Assistant coach(es)

- Matt Graves (Belmont Abbey)
- Bryan Dougher (Stony Brook)
- Octavius Hinnant (Glenville State)
- Nick Schmidt (Alfred State)

Legend

- (C) Team captain
- (S) Suspended
- (I) Ineligible
- (W) Walk-on
- Injured
- Current redshirt

Roster
Last update: October 21, 2026

== Schedule and results ==
| Date time, TV | Rank^{#} | Opponent^{#} | Result | Record | Site (attendance) city, state |
Non-conference regular season
| November 2, 2026*; 7:00 pm, ESPN+ | | Rivier | W 121–57 | 1–0 | Kennedy Family Athletic Complex (573); Lowell, MA |
| November 5, 2026*; 7:00 pm, ESPN+ | | at Merrimack; America East - Metro Challenge | W 71–61 | 2–0 | Hammel Court (1,621); North Andover, MA |
| November 8, 2026*; 1:00 pm, ESPN+ | | Marist; America East - Metro Challenge | W 63–61 | 3–0 | Kennedy Family Athletic Complex (384); Lowell, MA |
| November 11, 2026*; 7:00 pm, ESPN+ | | at UMass | L 62–72 | 3–1 | Mullins Center (3,034); Amherst, MA |
| November 17, 2026*; 6:00 pm, ESPN+ | | Saint Peter's | W 66–51 | 4–1 | Kennedy Family Athletic Complex (396); Lowell, MA |
| November 22, 2026*; 2:00 pm, ESPN+ | | at Cincinnati | L 68–78 | 4–2 | Fifth Third Arena; Cincinnati, OH |
| November 27, 2026*; 1:00 pm, FloSports | | vs. Hampton; Capital Thanksgiving Classic | | | Bender Arena; Washington, D.C. |
| November 28, 2026*; 4:00 pm, ESPN+ | | at American; Capital Thanksgiving Classic | | | Bender Arena; Washington, D.C. |
| November 29, 2026*; 1:00 pm | | vs. Radford; Capital Thanksgiving Classic | | | Bender Arena; Washington, D.C. |
| December 2, 2026*; 6:30 pm, ESPN+ | | at Georgetown | | | Capital One Arena; Washington, D.C. |
| December 5, 2026*; 7:00 pm, ACCN | | at Boston College | | | Conte Forum; Chestnut Hill, MA |
| December 9, 2026*; 11:00 am, ESPN+ | | at Sacred Heart | | | William H. Pitt Center; Fairfield, CT |
| December 12, 2026*; 2:00 pm, ESPN+ | | Stonehill | | | Kennedy Family Athletic Complex; Lowell, MA |
| December 16, 2026*; 3:00 pm, ESPN+ | | Fisher | | | Kennedy Family Athletic Complex; Lowell, MA |
| December 20, 2026*; 1:00 pm, ESPN+ | | Boston University | | | Kennedy Family Athletic Complex; Lowell, MA |
| December 29, 2026*; 2:00 pm, ESPN+ | | Emerson | | | Kennedy Family Athletic Complex; Lowell, MA |
America East regular season
| January 2, 2027; 2:00 pm | | at New Hampshire | | | Tsongas Center; Lowell, MA |
| January 7, 2027; 7:00 pm | | at Vermont | | | Patrick Gym; Burlington, VT |
| January 9, 2027; 2:00 pm | | Bryant | | | Kennedy Family Athletic Complex; Lowell, MA |
| January 14, 2027; 6:00 pm | | Binghamton | | | Kennedy Family Athletic Complex; Lowell, MA |
| January 18, 2027; 2:00 pm | | at Maine | | | Memorial Gymnasium; Orono, ME |
| January 23, 2027; 1:00 pm | | at UMBC | | | Chesapeake Employers Insurance Arena; Catonsville, MD |
| January 28, 2027; 6:00 pm | | Albany | | | Kennedy Family Athletic Complex; Lowell, MA |
| January 30, 2027; 4:00 pm | | at NJIT | | | Wellness and Events Center; Newark, NJ |
| February 4, 2027; 6:00 pm | | Maine | | | Kennedy Family Athletic Complex; Lowell, MA |
| February 6, 2027; 2:00 pm | | at New Hampshire | | | Lundholm Gym; Durham, NH |
| February 13, 2027; 2:00 pm | | at Binghamton | | | Events Center; Vestal, NY |
| February 18, 2027; 6:00 pm | | NJIT | | | Kennedy Family Athletic Complex; Lowell, MA |
| February 20, 2027; 1:00 pm | | UMBC | | | Kennedy Family Athletic Complex; Lowell, MA |
| February 25, 2027; 6:00 pm | | at Bryant | | | Chace Athletic Center; Smithfield, RI |
| February 27, 2027; 5:00 pm | | Vermont | | | Tsongas Center; Lowell, MA |
| March 2, 2027 | | at Albany | | | Broadview Center; Guilderland, NY |
*Non-conference game. ^{#}Rankings from AP poll. (#) Tournament seedings in parentheses. All times are in Eastern.
