= 2025–26 America East Conference men's basketball season =

College basketball season

2025–26 America East men's basketball season
- League: NCAA Division I
- Sport: Men's basketball
- Teams: 9

Regular season
- Season champions: UMBC
- Season MVP: TJ Hurley, Vermont
- Top scorer: Angel Montas Jr., UMass Lowell – 20.0 ppg

Tournament
- Champions: UMBC
- Runners-up: Vermont
- Finals MVP: DJ Armstrong Jr., UMBC

Basketball seasons
- ← 2024–25 2026–27 →

2025–26 America East Conference men's basketball standings
	Conf.				Overall
Team	W		L	PCT	W		L	PCT
UMBC †	14	–	2	.875	24	–	9	.727
Vermont	12	–	4	.750	22	–	12	.647
NJIT	10	–	6	.625	16	–	17	.485
UMass Lowell	9	–	7	.563	15	–	18	.455
Albany	7	–	9	.438	11	–	21	.344
Maine	6	–	10	.375	8	–	24	.250
Bryant	5	–	11	.313	9	–	22	.290
New Hampshire	5	–	11	.313	9	–	21	.300
Binghamton	4	–	12	.250	8	–	23	.258
† 2026 AmEast tournament winner

The 2025–26 America East men's basketball season began with practices in September 2025 and will end with the 2025 America East men's basketball tournament in March 2026. This is the 46th year of competition in men's basketball for the America East Conference.

== Head coaches ==
Team	Head coach	Previous job	Season	Overall record	America East record	NCAA Tournaments
Albany	Dwayne Killings	Marquette (asst.)	5th	51–76 (.402)	25–41 (.379)	0
Binghamton	Levell Sanders	Binghamton (asst.)	5th	55–67 (.451)	30–36 (.455)	0
Bryant	Jamion Christian	Pallacanestro Trieste	1st	0–0 (–)	0–0 (–)	0
Maine	Chris Markwood	Boston College (asst.)	4th	48–48 (.500)	24–24 (.500)	0
UMBC	Jim Ferry	Penn State (Interim HC)	5th	60–68 (.469)	30–36 (.455)	0
UMass Lowell	Pat Duquette	Northeastern (asst.)	13th	175–188 (.482)	95–108 (.468)	0
New Hampshire	Nathan Davis	Bucknell	3rd	24–39 (.381)	13–19 (.406)	0
NJIT	Grant Billmeier	Maryland (asst.)	3rd	13–46 (.220)	6–26 (.188)	0
Vermont	John Becker	Vermont (asst.)	15th	329–132 (.714)	193–34 (.850)	6

Notes:

- Season includes the 2025–26 season.
- Record numbers are through the end of the 2024–25 season.

== Preseason ==
=== Preseason coaches poll ===
2025–26 America East Preseason Coaches Poll
Rank	Team (First place votes)	Points
1	Vermont (7)	63
T2	Maine (1)	47
T2	Albany	47
4	UMass Lowell (1)	39
5	Binghamton	37
6	Bryant	35
7	UMBC	31
8	NJIT	13
9	New Hampshire	12

=== Preseason All-Conference Team ===
All-Conference Team
Quincy Allen, Bryant
TJ Hurley, Vermont
Demetrius Lilley, Binghamton
Amir Lindsey, Albany
TJ Long, Vermont
Josh Odunowo, UMBC

== Regular season ==
=== Player of the Week Awards ===
Week	Player of the Week	Rookie of the Week
1	TJ Long; Vermont	David Bolden; NJIT
2	DJ Armstrong; UMBC & Ari Fulton; NJIT	David Bolden (2); NJIT
3	TJ Hurley; Vermont	JJ Massaquoi; UMass Lowell
4	Gus Yalden; Vermont	Ty Tabales; Bryant
5	Jah’Likai King; UMBC	Ty Tabales (2); Bryant
6	Jaden Kempson; Albany	Timofei Rudovskii; Bryant
7	Gus Yalden (2); Vermont	Jake Blackburn; Binghamton
8	Jeremiah Quigley; Binghamton	Ty Tabales (3); Bryant
9	Angel Montas; UMass Lowell	Ashley Sims II; Bryant
10	Angel Montas (2); UMass Lowell	Timofei Rudovskii (2); Bryant
11	Amir Lindsey; Albany	Tyler Bike; New Hampshire
12	TJ Hurley (2); Vermont	Ace Flagg; Maine
13	Sebastian Robinson; NJIT	David Bolden (3); NJIT
14	Ari Fulton (2); NJIT	Victor Okojie; UMass Lowell
15	Gus Yalden (3); Vermont	David Bolden (4); NJIT
16	Angel Montas (3); UMass Lowell	Ty Tabales (4); Bryant

School	POTW	ROTW
Albany	2	0
Binghamton	1	1
Bryant	0	7
Maine	0	1
UMBC	2	0
UMass Lowell	3	2
New Hampshire	0	1
NJIT	3	4
Vermont	6	0

== Postseason ==
=== America East tournament ===
The conference tournament will be played from March 8 to March 15, 2026. All tournament games will be hosted at the higher seed's campus site. Teams are reseeded after quarterfinals.

=== NCAA Tournament ===
The conference champion will receive an automatic bid to the 2026 NCAA Division I men's basketball tournament.

Seed	Region	School	First Four	First round	Second round	Sweet Sixteen	Elite Eight	Final Four	Championship
16	Midwest	UMBC	L 83–86 vs. (16) Howard	DNP					

== Conference awards ==
2026 America East Men's Basketball Individual Awards
Award	Recipient(s)
Player of the Year	TJ Hurley, Vermont
Coach of the Year	Jim Ferry, UMBC
Defensive Player of the Year	Okechukwu Okeke, Albany
Sixth Man of the Year	Caden Diggs, UMBC
Rookie of the Year	David Bolden, NJIT
Newcomer of the Year	Gus Yalden, Vermont

2026 America East Men's Basketball All-Conference Teams
First Team	Second Team	Third Team	Defensive Team	Rookie Team
TJ Hurley, Vermont; Jah’Likai King, UMBC; Amir Lindsey, Albany; Angel Montas Jr., UMass Lowell; Gus Yalden, Vermont	DJ Armstrong Jr., UMBC; TJ Biel, Maine; Ari Fulton, NJIT; Sebastian Robinson, NJIT; Ace Valentine, UMBC	Belal El Shakery, New Hampshire; Austin Green, UMass Lowell; Okechukwu Okeke, Albany; Jeremiah Quigley, Binghamton; Xavier Spencer, UMass Lowell	TJ Biel, Maine; Logan Carey, Maine; TJ Hurley, Vermont; Josh Odunowo, UMBC; Okechukwu Okeke, Albany	Tyler Bike, New Hamshire; David Bolden, NJIT; Ace Flagg, Maine; Timofei Rudovskii, Bryant; Ty Tabales, Bryant
