= 2025–26 Vermont Catamounts men's basketball team =

American college basketball season

2025–26 Vermont Catamounts men's basketball
- Conference: America East Conference
- Record: 22–12 (12–4 America East)
- Head coach: John Becker (15th season)
- Associate head coach: Ryan Schneider
- Assistant coaches: Nathan Johnson; Derryk O’Grady; Braeden Estes
- Home arena: Patrick Gym

2025–26 America East Conference men's basketball standings
	Conf.				Overall
Team	W		L	PCT	W		L	PCT
UMBC †	14	–	2	.875	24	–	9	.727
Vermont	12	–	4	.750	22	–	12	.647
NJIT	10	–	6	.625	16	–	17	.485
UMass Lowell	9	–	7	.563	15	–	18	.455
Albany	7	–	9	.438	11	–	21	.344
Maine	6	–	10	.375	8	–	24	.250
Bryant	5	–	11	.313	9	–	22	.290
New Hampshire	5	–	11	.313	9	–	21	.300
Binghamton	4	–	12	.250	8	–	23	.258
† 2026 AmEast tournament winner

The 2025–26 Vermont Catamounts men's basketball team represented the University of Vermont during the 2025–26 NCAA Division I men's basketball season. The Catamounts, led by fifteenth-year head coach John Becker, played their home games at the Patrick Gym in Burlington, Vermont as members of the America East Conference.

== Previous season ==
The Catamounts finished the 2024–25 season 21–12, 13–3 in America East play, to finish in second place. They defeated New Hampshire in the quarterfinals of the America East tournament, before losing to Maine in the semifinals.

== Preseason ==
On October 20, 2025, the America East Conference released their preseason polls. Vermont was picked to finish first in the conference, while receiving seven first-place votes.

=== Preseason rankings ===
America East Preseason Poll
Place	Team	Votes
1	Vermont	63 (7)
T–2	Maine	47 (1)
T–2	Albany	47
4	UMass Lowell	39 (1)
5	Binghamton	37
6	Bryant	35
7	UMBC	31
8	NJIT	13
9	New Hampshire	12
(#) first-place votes

=== Preseason All-America East Team ===
Preseason All-America East Team
Player	Year	Position
TJ Hurley	Senior	Guard
TJ Long	Graduate	Guard

== Roster ==
2025–26 Vermont Catamounts men's basketball team
Players
Coaches

Pos.	#	Name	Height	Weight	Year	Previous school	Hometown
F	0	David Simon	6 ft 11 in (2.11 m)	190 lb (86 kg)	RS So	San Diego	Windsor, ON
G	1	Momo Nkugwa	6 ft 3 in (1.91 m)	—	Fr	The Governor's Academy	Chelmsford, MA
F	2	Ben Michaels	6 ft 8 in (2.03 m)	220 lb (100 kg)	So	Long Island Lutheran HS	Ipswich, England
G	3	TJ Hurley	6 ft 5 in (1.96 m)	190 lb (86 kg)	Sr	The Rock School	Pelham, ON
F	4	Jackson Skipper	6 ft 7 in (2.01 m)	190 lb (86 kg)	RS Jr	Link Year Prep	Tulsa, OK
G	5	Sean Blake	6 ft 2 in (1.88 m)	160 lb (73 kg)	So	Royal Crown Academy	Mississauga, ON
G	12	Ben Wesson	6 ft 4 in (1.93 m)	170 lb (77 kg)	RS Fr	Albemarle HS	Charlottesville, VA
G	13	Chris Kuzemka	6 ft 0 in (1.83 m)	183 lb (83 kg)	GS	Loyola (MD)	Clifton, VA
F	15	Drew Bessette	6 ft 8 in (2.03 m)	225 lb (102 kg)	RS Fr	Rice Memorial HS	Milton, VT
F	19	Gus Yalden	6 ft 9 in (2.06 m)	258 lb (117 kg)	RS So	Seton Hall	Appleton, WI
G	20	TJ Long	6 ft 4 in (1.93 m)	195 lb (88 kg)	GS	Fairfield	Rockville Centre, NY
G	21	Lucas Mari	6 ft 6 in (1.98 m)	198 lb (90 kg)	Fr	Valencia Basket	Valencia, Spain
G	24	Ben Johnson	6 ft 3 in (1.91 m)	195 lb (88 kg)	GS	Bellarmine	Lexington, KY
G	25	Sincere Clemons	6 ft 2 in (1.88 m)	170 lb (77 kg)	RS Fr	Northfield Mount Hermon School	Ithaca, NY
F	32	Trey Woodyard	6 ft 6 in (1.98 m)	165 lb (75 kg)	GS	New Hampshire	London, OH
F	34	Noah Barnett	6 ft 9 in (2.06 m)	205 lb (93 kg)	RS So	Don Bosco Prep	Poughkeepsie, NY

Head coach

- John Becker (Catholic)

Assistant coach(es)

- Ryan Schneider (Marist)
- Nathan Johnson (St. Francis Xavier)
- Derryk O'Grady (Vermont)
- Braeden Estes (New Hampshire)

Legend

- (C) Team captain
- (S) Suspended
- (I) Ineligible
- (W) Walk-on
- Injured
- Current redshirt

Roster
Last update: November 6, 2025

== Schedule and results ==
Date time, TV	Rank^{#}	Opponent^{#}	Result	Record	Site (attendance) city, state
Exhibition
October 25, 2025*; 7:00 p.m.		Saint Michael's	L 74–79	–	Patrick Gym; Burlington, VT
October 29, 2025*; 7:00 p.m.		Saint Anselm	W 80–78	–	Patrick Gym; Burlington, VT
Non-conference regular season
November 3, 2025*; 7:00 p.m., ESPN+		Western New England	W 75–68	1–0	Patrick Gym (1,723); Burlington, VT
November 5, 2025*; 7:00 p.m., ESPN+		Plattsburgh State	W 113–62	2–0	Patrick Gym (1,732); Burlington, VT
November 9, 2025*; 2:00 p.m., ESPN+		at Brown	W 89–84 ^{2OT}	3–0	Pizzitola Sports Center (764); Providence, RI
November 15, 2025*; 1:00 p.m., NESN+/FloCollege		at Northeastern	W 85–74	4–0	Matthews Arena (3,335); Boston, MA
November 18, 2025*; 6:30 p.m., ESPN+		at Buffalo	L 90–94	4–1	Alumni Arena (1,466); Amherst, NY
November 24, 2025*; 1:30 p.m., ESPNU		vs. Liberty; ESPN Events Invitational; Adventure Bracket quarterfinals	L 73–79	4–2	State Farm Field House (1,315); Kissimmee, FL
November 25, 2025*; 2:30 p.m., ESPNU		vs. Rhode Island; ESPN Events Invitational; Adventure Bracket consolation semifinals	L 65–80	4–3	State Farm Field House (957); Kissimmee, FL
November 26, 2025*; 5:00 p.m., ESPN+		vs. Princeton; ESPN Events Invitational; Adventure Bracket 7th place game	W 79–74	5–3	State Farm Field House; Kissimmee, FL
November 30, 2025*; 2:00 p.m., ESPN+		Yale	L 74−77	5−4	Patrick Gym (2,057); Burlington, VT
December 3, 2025*; 9:30 pm, ESPN+		at Oregon State	L 58−80	5−5	Gill Coliseum (2,361); Corvallis, OR
December 6, 2025*; 5:00 p.m., ESPN+		at Pepperdine	W 65−56	6−5	Firestone Fieldhouse (566); Malibu, CA
December 14, 2025*; 2:00 p.m., ESPN+		Merrimack	W 66–59	7–5	Patrick Gym (2,013); Burlington, VT
December 17, 2025*; 7:00 p.m., ESPN+		Siena	W 83–69	8–5	Patrick Gym (1,767); Burlington, VT
December 20, 2025*; 2:00 p.m., ESPN+		Iona	L 78−83	8−6	Patrick Gym (2,180); Burlington, VT
December 30, 2025*; 1:00 p.m., ESPN+		at Princeton	L 69–75 ^{OT}	8–7	Jadwin Gymnasium (2,816); Princeton, NJ
America East regular season
January 3, 2026; 1:00 p.m., ESPN+		at New Hampshire	W 80–61	9–7 (1–0)	Lundholm Gym (813); Durham, NH
January 8, 2026; 7:00 p.m., ESPN+		Binghamton	W 60–59	10–7 (2–0)	Patrick Gym (1,874); Burlington, VT
January 15, 2026; 7:00 p.m., ESPN+		Maine	W 67–62	11–7 (3–0)	Patrick Gym (2,202); Burlington, VT
January 19, 2026; 1:00 p.m., ESPNU		at Albany	L 68–75	11–8 (3–1)	Broadview Center (3,008); Albany, NY
January 22, 2026; 6:00 p.m., ESPN+		at UMass Lowell	W 77–68	12–8 (4–1)	Kennedy Family Athletic Complex (714); Lowell, MA
January 24, 2026; 1:00 p.m., ESPN+		at Bryant	W 62–52	13–8 (5–1)	Chace Athletic Center (844); Smithfield, RI
January 29, 2026; 7:00 p.m., ESPN+		UMBC	W 64–55	14–8 (6–1)	Patrick Gym (2,260); Burlington, VT
January 31, 2026; 4:30 p.m., ESPN+		NJIT	L 77–79	14–9 (6–2)	Patrick Gym (2,383); Burlington, VT
February 5, 2026; 6:00 p.m., ESPN+		at Maine	L 70–76	14–10 (6–3)	Memorial Gymnasium (1,140); Orono, ME
February 7, 2026; 1:30 p.m., ESPN+		New Hampshire	W 80–57	15–10 (7–3)	Patrick Gym (2,522); Burlington, VT
February 12, 2026; 6:30 p.m., ESPN+		at Binghamton	W 73–65	16–10 (8–3)	Dr. Bai Lee Court (1,641); Vestal, NY
February 14, 2026; 2:00 p.m., ESPN+		Bryant	W 90–63	17–10 (9–3)	Patrick Gym (2,327); Burlington, VT
February 19, 2026; 6:00 p.m., ESPN+		at UMBC	L 62–75	17–11 (9–4)	Chesapeake Employers Insurance Arena (1,805); Catonsville, MD
February 21, 2026; 7:00 p.m., ESPN+		at NJIT	W 70–64	18–11 (10–4)	Wellness and Events Center; Newark, NJ
February 26, 2026; 7:00 p.m., ESPN+		UMass Lowell	W 66–64	19–11 (11–4)	Patrick Gym (2,496); Burlington, VT
March 3, 2026; 7:00 p.m., ESPN+		Albany	W 69–56	20–11 (12–4)	Patrick Gym (2,309); Burlington, VT
America East tournament
March 7, 2026; 2:00 p.m., ESPN+	(2)	(7) Bryant; Quarterfinals	W 77–57	21–11	Patrick Gym (1,936); Burlington, VT
March 10, 2026; 7:00 p.m., ESPN+	(2)	(3) NJIT; Semifinals	W 63–54	22–11	Patrick Gym (2,048); Burlington, VT
March 14, 2026; 11:00 a.m., ESPN2	(2)	at (1) UMBC; Championship	L 59–74	22–12	Chesapeake Employers Insurance Arena (4,753); Catonsville, MD
*Non-conference game. ^{#}Rankings from AP poll. (#) Tournament seedings in parentheses. All times are in Eastern.
