= 2025–26 Maine Black Bears men's basketball team =

American college basketball season

2025–26 Maine Black Bears men's basketball
- Conference: America East Conference
- Record: 8–24 (6–10 America East)
- Head coach: Chris Markwood (4th season)
- Assistant coaches: Rob O'Driscoll; Pete Gash; Jordon Bronner; Tommy Freeman
- Home arena: Memorial Gymnasium

2025–26 America East Conference men's basketball standings
	Conf.				Overall
Team	W		L	PCT	W		L	PCT
UMBC	14	–	2	.875	22	–	8	.733
Vermont	12	–	4	.750	21	–	11	.656
NJIT	10	–	6	.625	16	–	16	.500
UMass Lowell	9	–	7	.563	15	–	17	.469
Albany	7	–	9	.438	11	–	21	.344
Maine	6	–	10	.375	8	–	24	.250
Bryant	5	–	11	.313	9	–	22	.290
New Hampshire	5	–	11	.313	9	–	21	.300
Binghamton	4	–	12	.250	8	–	23	.258
† 2026 AmEast tournament winner As of March 7, 2026

The 2025–26 Maine Black Bears men's basketball team represented the University of Maine during the 2025–26 NCAA Division I men's basketball season. The Black Bears, led by fourth-year head coach Chris Markwood, played their home games at the Memorial Gymnasium in Orono, Maine as members of the America East Conference.

== Previous season ==
The Black Bears finished the 2024–25 season 20–14, 10–6 in America East play, to finish in third place. They defeated UMass Lowell and Vermont, before losing to Bryant in the championship game of the America East tournament.

== Preseason ==
On October 20, 2025, the America East Conference released their preseason polls. Maine was picked to finish second in the conference, while receiving a first-place vote.

=== Preseason rankings ===
America East Preseason Poll
Place	Team	Votes
1	Vermont	63 (7)
T–2	Maine	47 (1)
T–2	Albany	47
4	UMass Lowell	39 (1)
5	Binghamton	37
6	Bryant	35
7	UMBC	31
8	NJIT	13
9	New Hampshire	12
(#) first-place votes

=== Preseason All-America East Team ===
No players were named to the All-America East team.

== Roster ==
2025–26 Maine Black Bears men's basketball team
Players
Coaches

Pos.	#	Name	Height	Weight	Year	Previous school	Hometown
G	0	Logan Carey	6 ft 3 in (1.91 m)	183 lb (83 kg)	Jr	St. Paul's School	Shelton, CT
F	1	TJ Biel	6 ft 9 in (2.06 m)	205 lb (93 kg)	GS	Southeast Missouri State	Calgary, AB
G	3	Ryan Mabrey	6 ft 5 in (1.96 m)	195 lb (88 kg)	Sr	Quinnipiac	Belmar, NJ
G	4	Caleb Crawford	6 ft 0 in (1.83 m)	172 lb (78 kg)	So	Loomis Chaffee School	Bronx, NY
G	5	Isaac Bonilla	6 ft 1 in (1.85 m)	175 lb (79 kg)	Jr	Bradford Christian Academy	Danville, NH
F	6	Yanis Bamba	6 ft 6 in (1.98 m)	211 lb (96 kg)	Jr	Wichita State	Montreal, QC
G	8	Darius Lopes	6 ft 4 in (1.93 m)	167 lb (76 kg)	So	Vermont Academy	West Warwick, RI
F	10	Killian Gribben	6 ft 10 in (2.08 m)	222 lb (101 kg)	Sr	Siena	Letterkenny, Ireland
F	11	Ace Flagg	6 ft 7 in (2.01 m)	205 lb (93 kg)	Fr	Greensboro Day School	Newport, ME
F	12	Emmitt Byther	6 ft 6 in (1.98 m)	225 lb (102 kg)	Fr	Old Town HS	Old Town, ME
F	14	Amare Allen	6 ft 7 in (2.01 m)	208 lb (94 kg)	So	CODE Academy	Ajax, ON
F	15	John Shea	6 ft 6 in (1.98 m)	235 lb (107 kg)	Sr	Edward Little HS	Auburn, ME
F	21	Joshua Ojuri	6 ft 6 in (1.98 m)	206 lb (93 kg)	Fr	Massanutten Military Academy	Providence, RI
G	24	Mekhi Gray	6 ft 4 in (1.93 m)	190 lb (86 kg)	Sr	UMass Lowell	Montrose, NY
F	25	Keelan Steele	6 ft 10 in (2.08 m)	230 lb (104 kg)	Sr	Victory Academy	Alton, ON
G	64	Bashir N'Galang	6 ft 3 in (1.91 m)	190 lb (86 kg)	Fr	Fort Erie International Academy	Saint-Laurent, QC

Head coach

- Chris Markwood (Maine)

Assistant coach(es)

- Rob O'Driscoll (Villanova)
- Pete Gash (Chattanooga)
- Jordon Bronner (New Hampshire)
- Tommy Freeman (Ohio)

Legend

- (C) Team captain
- (S) Suspended
- (I) Ineligible
- (W) Walk-on
- Injured
- Current redshirt

Roster
Last update: November 4, 2025

== Schedule and results ==
Date time, TV	Rank^{#}	Opponent^{#}	Result	Record	Site (attendance) city, state
Exhibition
October 29, 2025*; 6:30 p.m.		Husson	W 89–47	–	Cross Insurance Center; Bangor, ME
Non-conference regular season
November 3, 2025*; 8:00 p.m., ESPN+		at George Washington	L 47–67	0–1	Charles E. Smith Center (2,043); Washington, D.C.
November 8, 2025*; 5:00 p.m., FloCollege		at Stony Brook	L 60–71	0–2	Stony Brook Arena (1,803); Stony Brook, NY
November 10, 2025*; 6:30 p.m., BTN		at Rutgers	L 60–72	0–3	Jersey Mike's Arena (8,000); Piscataway, NJ
November 16, 2025*; 2:00 p.m., ESPN+		Quinnipiac	L 64–70	0–4	Memorial Gymnasium (1,380); Orono, ME
November 19, 2025*; 7:30 p.m., ESPN+		at Merrimack	L 65–72	0–5	Merrimack Athletics Complex (1,572); North Andover, MA
November 23, 2025*; 2:00 p.m., ESPN+		Brown	L 53–58	0–6	Memorial Gymnasium (1,157); Orono, ME
November 28, 2025*; 4:00 p.m., ESPN+		at American; Capital Thanksgiving Classic	L 61–74	0–7	Bender Arena (820); Washington, D.C.
November 29, 2025*; 1:00 pm		vs. Longwood; Capital Thanksgiving Classic	L 61–65	0–8	Bender Arena (191); Washington, D.C.
November 30, 2025*; 1:00 p.m.		vs. Siena; Capital Thanksgiving Classic	L 60–64	0–9	Bender Arena (136); Washington, D.C.
December 3, 2025*; 7:00 p.m., ESPN+		at Ohio	L 57–79	0–10	Convocation Center (3,553); Athens, OH
December 6, 2025*; 1:00 p.m., ESPN+		at Miami (OH)	L 61–93	0–11	Millett Hall (1,349); Oxford, OH
December 10, 2025*; 7:00 p.m., ESPN+		at Boston University	W 69−59	1−11	Case Gym (654); Boston, MA
December 13, 2025*; 2:00 p.m., ESPN+		Canisius	L 43–70	1–12	Memorial Gymnasium (1,190); Orono, ME
December 21, 2025*; 2:00 p.m., FloCollege		at Drexel	L 56–74	1–13	Daskalakis Athletic Center (796); Philadelphia, PA
December 30, 2025*; 2:00 p.m., ESPN+		UMaine Fort Kent	W 104–66	2–13	Memorial Gymnasium (1,277); Orono, ME
America East regular season
January 3, 2026; 2:00 p.m., ESPN+		Bryant	L 51–56	2–14 (0–1)	Memorial Gymnasium (1,131); Orono, ME
January 8, 2026; 6:00 p.m., ESPN+		at UMBC	L 62–69	2–15 (0–2)	Chesapeake Employers Insurance Arena (1,125); Catonsville, MD
January 10, 2026; 2:00 p.m., ESPN+		at NJIT	W 74–70	3–15 (1–2)	Wellness and Events Center (343); Newark, NJ
January 15, 2026; 7:00 p.m., ESPN+		at Vermont	L 62–67	3–16 (1–3)	Patrick Gym (2,202); Burlington, VT
January 19, 2026; 2:00 p.m., ESPN+		New Hampshire	L 48–65	3–17 (1–4)	Memorial Gymnasium (1,157); Orono, ME
January 22, 2026; 6:00 p.m., ESPN+		Albany	W 52–49	4–17 (2–4)	Memorial Gymnasium (1,065); Orono, ME
January 24, 2026; 2:00 p.m., ESPN+		Binghamton	W 79–63	5–17 (3–4)	Memorial Gymnasium (1,276); Orono, ME
January 31, 2026; 2:00 p.m., ESPN+		at UMass Lowell	L 77–91	5–18 (3–5)	Kennedy Family Athletic Complex (957); Lowell, MA
February 5, 2026; 6:00 p.m., ESPN+		Vermont	W 76–70	6–18 (4–5)	Memorial Gymnasium (1,140); Orono, ME
February 7, 2026; 4:00 p.m., ESPN+		at Bryant	L 67–73	6–19 (4–6)	Chace Athletic Center (575); Smithfield, RI
February 12, 2026; 6:00 p.m., ESPN+		UMBC	L 62–78	6–20 (4–7)	Memorial Gymnasium (1,061); Orono, ME
February 14, 2026; 3:00 p.m., ESPN+		NJIT	L 58–67	6–21 (4–8)	Memorial Gymnasium (1,152); Orono, ME
February 21, 2026; 4:00 p.m., ESPN+		at New Hampshire	W 61–58	7–21 (5–8)	Lundholm Gym (372); Durham, NH
February 26, 2026; 6:30 p.m., ESPN+		at Albany	W 70–59	8–21 (6–8)	Broadview Center (1,622); Albany, NY
February 28, 2026; 2:00 p.m., ESPN+		at Binghamton	L 67–74	8–22 (6–9)	Dr. Bai Lee Court (1,959); Vestal, NY
March 3, 2026; 6:00 p.m., ESPN+		UMass Lowell	L 56–67	8–23 (6–10)	Memorial Gymnasium (1,148); Orono, ME
America East tournament
March 7, 2026; 4:00 p.m., ESPN+	(6)	at (3) NJIT; Quarterfinals	L 58–60	8–24	Wellness and Events Center (1,297); Newark, NJ
*Non-conference game. ^{#}Rankings from AP poll. (#) Tournament seedings in parentheses. All times are in Eastern.
