= 2025–26 NJIT Highlanders men's basketball team =

American college basketball season

2025–26 NJIT Highlanders men's basketball
- Conference: America East Conference
- Record: 16–17 (10–6 America East)
- Head coach: Grant Billmeier (3rd season)
- Assistant coaches: RaShawn Stores; Pete Lappas; Thomas Messinger; Ty Goode
- Home arena: Joel and Diane Bloom Wellness and Events Center

2025–26 America East Conference men's basketball standings
	Conf.				Overall
Team	W		L	PCT	W		L	PCT
UMBC	14	–	2	.875	22	–	8	.733
Vermont	12	–	4	.750	21	–	11	.656
NJIT	10	–	6	.625	16	–	16	.500
UMass Lowell	9	–	7	.563	15	–	17	.469
Albany	7	–	9	.438	11	–	21	.344
Maine	6	–	10	.375	8	–	24	.250
Bryant	5	–	11	.313	9	–	22	.290
New Hampshire	5	–	11	.313	9	–	21	.300
Binghamton	4	–	12	.250	8	–	23	.258
† 2026 AmEast tournament winner As of March 7, 2026

The 2025–26 NJIT Highlanders men's basketball team represented the New Jersey Institute of Technology during the 2025–26 NCAA Division I men's basketball season. The Highlanders, led by third-year head coach Grant Billmeier and played their home games at the Joel and Diane Bloom Wellness and Events Center in Newark, New Jersey as members of the America East Conference.

== Previous season ==
The Highlanders finished the 2024–25 season 6–25, 3–13 in America East play, to finish in last place. They failed to make the America East tournament, as only the top eight teams qualify.

== Preseason ==
On October 20, 2025, the America East Conference released their preseason polls. NJIT was picked to finish eighth in the conference.

=== Preseason rankings ===
America East Preseason Poll
Place	Team	Votes
1	Vermont	63 (7)
T–2	Maine	47 (1)
T–2	Albany	47
4	UMass Lowell	39 (1)
5	Binghamton	37
6	Bryant	35
7	UMBC	31
8	NJIT	13
9	New Hampshire	12
(#) first-place votes

=== Preseason All-America East Team ===
No players were named to the All-America East team.

== Roster ==
2025–26 NJIT Highlanders men's basketball team
Players
Coaches

Pos.	#	Name	Height	Weight	Year	Previous school	Hometown
G	0	Sebastian Robinson	6 ft 3 in (1.91 m)	190 lb (86 kg)	Jr	Roselle Catholic HS	Montclair, NJ
G	1	David Bolden	6 ft 0 in (1.83 m)	185 lb (84 kg)	Fr	Nicolet HS	Milwaukee, WI
G	2	Jeremy Clayville	6 ft 1 in (1.85 m)	175 lb (79 kg)	So	Saint Francis (PA)	Ridgewood, NJ
F	3	Jordan Rogers	6 ft 6 in (1.98 m)	215 lb (98 kg)	So	The Phelps School	Ridgewood, NJ
G	5	AJ Altobelli	6 ft 0 in (1.83 m)	165 lb (75 kg)	Fr	Union Catholic Regional HS	Westfield, NJ
G	7	Cameron Piggee	6 ft 1 in (1.85 m)	180 lb (82 kg)	Jr	Rutgers Prep	North Brunswick, NJ
F	8	Jeffrey Akintolu	6 ft 7 in (2.01 m)	210 lb (95 kg)	Jr	Avon Old Farms	Welling, England
F	11	Melvyn Ebonkoli	6 ft 8 in (2.03 m)	237 lb (108 kg)	GS	Kansas City	Trappes, France
C	13	Stefan Jimenez-Vojnic	6 ft 11 in (2.11 m)	230 lb (104 kg)	So	Academy of Central Florida	Toronto, ON
G	14	Quentin Duncan	6 ft 4 in (1.93 m)	180 lb (82 kg)	So	Putnam Science Academy	Waterbury, CT
G	24	Ari Fulton	6 ft 7 in (2.01 m)	205 lb (93 kg)	So	Westover HS	Fayetteville, NC
F	25	John Kelly	6 ft 8 in (2.03 m)	205 lb (93 kg)	So	Rutgers Prep	Hillsborough, NJ
C	32	Malachi Arrington	6 ft 11 in (2.11 m)	220 lb (100 kg)	So	Immaculate Conception HS	Somerville, NJ
F	33	Zack Scherler	6 ft 11 in (2.11 m)	245 lb (111 kg)	Fr	Vermont Academy	Clarkston, MI
G	44	Rocco Awad	6 ft 2 in (1.88 m)	195 lb (88 kg)	Fr	London Basketball Academy	Windsor, ON

Head coach

- Grant Billmeier (Seton Hall)

Assistant coach(es)

- RaShawn Stores (Manhattan)
- Pete Lappas (Boston College)
- Thomas Messinger (Emerson)
- Ty Goode (Fairfield)

Legend

- (C) Team captain
- (S) Suspended
- (I) Ineligible
- (W) Walk-on
- Injured
- Current redshirt

Roster
Last update: November 5, 2025

== Schedule and results ==
Date time, TV	Rank^{#}	Opponent^{#}	Result	Record	Site (attendance) city, state
Non-conference regular season
November 4, 2025*; 7:00 p.m., ESPN+		at Fordham	W 72–61	1–0	Rose Hill Gymnasium (1,008); The Bronx, NY
November 8, 2025*; 2:00 p.m., ESPN+		Fairfield	L 53–74	1–1	Wellness and Events Center (1,454); Newark, NJ
November 11, 2025*; 7:00 p.m., ESPN+		at Loyola (MD)	W 66–64	2–1	Reitz Arena (914); Baltimore, MD
November 15, 2025*; 4:00 p.m., ESPN+		Fairleigh Dickinson	W 93–81	3–1	Wellness and Events Center (790); Newark, NJ
November 18, 2025*; 7:00 p.m., NBCSPHI		at Drexel	L 43–75	3–2	Daskalakis Athletic Center (802); Philadelphia, PA
November 22, 2025*; 12:00 p.m., ESPN+		at Navy	L 70–86	3–3	Alumni Hall (784); Annapolis, MD
November 24, 2025*; 7:00 p.m., ESPN+		at Cincinnati	L 67–94	3–4	Fifth Third Arena (8,774); Cincinnati, OH
November 26, 2025*; 9:00 pm, ACCN		at No. 6 Louisville	L 47–104	3–5	KFC Yum! Center (13,825); Louisville, KY
November 28, 2025*; 4:00 p.m., ESPN+		at Eastern Michigan	L 55–73	3–6	George Gervin GameAbove Center (1,484); Ypsilanti, MI
December 5, 2025*; 7:00 p.m., ESPN+		at High Point	L 72–89	3–7	Qubein Center (2,293); High Point, NC
December 10, 2025*; 7:00 p.m., ESPN+		New Haven	W 70−64	4−7	Wellness and Events Center (792); Newark, NJ
December 13, 2025*; 2:00 p.m., ESPN+		Sacred Heart	L 49–65	4–8	Wellness and Events Center (816); Newark, NJ
December 22, 2025*; 2:00 p.m., ESPN+		at Butler	L 52–101	4–9	Hinkle Fieldhouse (6,304); Indianapolis, IN
December 29, 2025*; 4:00 p.m., ESPN+		SUNY Canton	W 95–60	5–9	Wellness and Events Center (352); Newark, NJ
December 31, 2025*; 2:00 p.m., ESPN+		at Penn	L 61–80	5–10	The Palestra (1,125); Philadelphia, PA
America East regular season
January 3, 2026; 2:00 p.m., ESPN+		at Binghamton	W 73–65	6–10 (1–0)	Dr. Bai Lee Court (1,456); Vestal, NY
January 8, 2026; 7:00 p.m., ESPN+		New Hampshire	W 80–76	7–10 (2–0)	Wellness and Events Center (220); Newark, NJ
January 10, 2026; 2:00 p.m., ESPN+		Maine	L 70–74	7–11 (2–1)	Wellness and Events Center (343); Newark, NJ
January 15, 2026; 6:00 p.m., ESPN+		at UMass Lowell	W 73–64	8–11 (3–1)	Kennedy Family Athletic Complex (472); Lowell, MA
January 19, 2026; 2:00 p.m., ESPN+		Bryant	W 79–55	9–11 (4–1)	Wellness and Events Center (545); Newark, NJ
January 22, 2026; 6:00 p.m., ESPN+		at UMBC	L 74–87	9–12 (4–2)	Chesapeake Employers Insurance Arena; Catonsville, MD
January 29, 2026; 6:30 p.m., ESPN+		at Albany	W 77–68	10–12 (5–2)	Broadview Center (2,006); Albany, NY
January 31, 2026; 4:30 p.m., ESPN+		at Vermont	W 79–77	11–12 (6–2)	Patrick Gym (2,383); Burlington, VT
February 5, 2026; 7:00 p.m., ESPN+		UMass Lowell	W 81–56	12–12 (7–2)	Wellness and Events Center (181); Newark, NJ
February 7, 2026; 4:00 p.m., ESPN+		Binghamton	W 73–64	13–12 (8–2)	Wellness and Events Center (430); Newark, NJ
February 12, 2026; 6:00 p.m., ESPN+		at New Hampshire	W 76–70	14–12 (9–2)	Lundholm Gym (338); Durham, NH
February 14, 2026; 3:00 p.m., ESPN+		at Maine	W 67–58	15–12 (10–2)	Memorial Gymnasium (1,152); Orono, ME
February 19, 2026; 7:00 p.m., ESPN+		Albany	L 63–81	15–13 (10–3)	Wellness and Events Center (507); Newark, NJ
February 21, 2026; 7:00 p.m., ESPN+		Vermont	L 64–70	15–14 (10–4)	Wellness and Events Center; Newark, NJ
February 28, 2026; 4:00 p.m., ESPN+		at Bryant	L 52–69	15–15 (10–5)	Chace Athletic Center (722); Smithfield, RI
March 3, 2026; 6:00 p.m., ESPN+		UMBC	L 52–91	15–16 (10–6)	Wellness and Events Center (460); Newark, NJ
America East tournament
March 7, 2026; 4:00 p.m., ESPN+	(3)	(6) Maine; Quarterfinals	W 60–58	16–16	Wellness and Events Center (1,297); Newark, NJ
March 10, 2026; 7:00 p.m., ESPN+	(3)	at (2) Vermont; Semifinals	L 54–63	16–17	Patrick Gym (2,048); Burlington, VT
*Non-conference game. ^{#}Rankings from AP poll. (#) Tournament seedings in parentheses. All times are in Eastern.
