= 2025–26 New Hampshire Wildcats men's basketball team =

American college basketball season

2025–1926 New Hampshire Wildcats men's basketball
- Conference: America East Conference
- Record: 9–21 (5–11 America East)
- Head coach: Nathan Davis (3rd season)
- Assistant coaches: Tyler Wilson; Luis Guzman; Matt Miller; Kevin Nichols
- Home arena: Lundholm Gym

2025–26 America East Conference men's basketball standings
	Conf.				Overall
Team	W		L	PCT	W		L	PCT
UMBC †	14	–	2	.875	24	–	9	.727
Vermont	12	–	4	.750	22	–	12	.647
NJIT	10	–	6	.625	16	–	17	.485
UMass Lowell	9	–	7	.563	15	–	18	.455
Albany	7	–	9	.438	11	–	21	.344
Maine	6	–	10	.375	8	–	24	.250
Bryant	5	–	11	.313	9	–	22	.290
New Hampshire	5	–	11	.313	9	–	21	.300
Binghamton	4	–	12	.250	8	–	23	.258
† 2026 AmEast tournament winner

The 2025–26 New Hampshire Wildcats men's basketball team represented the University of New Hampshire during the 2025–26 NCAA Division I men's basketball season. The Wildcats, led by third-year head coach Nathan Davis, played their home games at the Lundholm Gym in Durham, New Hampshire as members of the America East Conference.

== Previous season ==
The Wildcats finished the 2024–25 season 8–24, 6–10 in America East play, to finish in a tie for sixth place. They were defeated by Vermont in the quarterfinals of the America East tournament.

== Preseason ==
On October 20, 2025, the America East Conference released their preseason polls. New Hampshire was picked to finish last in the conference.

=== Preseason rankings ===
America East Preseason Poll
Place	Team	Votes
1	Vermont	63 (7)
T–2	Maine	47 (1)
T–2	Albany	47
4	UMass Lowell	39 (1)
5	Binghamton	37
6	Bryant	35
7	UMBC	31
8	NJIT	13
9	New Hampshire	12
(#) first-place votes

=== Preseason All-America East Team ===
No players were named to the All-America East team.

== Roster ==
2025–26 New Hampshire Wildcats men's basketball team
Players
Coaches

Pos.	#	Name	Height	Weight	Year	Previous school	Hometown
G	0	Tyler Bike	5 ft 10 in (1.78 m)	170 lb (77 kg)	Fr	Phillips Exeter Academy	Merrimack, NH
G	1	Jack Graham	6 ft 3 in (1.91 m)	185 lb (84 kg)	Jr	Richmond	Smithfield, RI
F	3	Dylan Saunders	6 ft 8 in (2.03 m)	202 lb (92 kg)	Jr	Iona	Roanoke, VA
G	4	Myles Blackley	6 ft 4 in (1.93 m)	170 lb (77 kg)	Fr	Immaculate Conception HS	Summit, NJ
G	5	Reginald Kennedy Jr.	6 ft 1 in (1.85 m)	180 lb (82 kg)	RS Fr	UAB	Fayetteville, GA
F/C	6	Giannos Xanthopoulos	6 ft 10 in (2.08 m)	220 lb (100 kg)	Fr	Fort Erie International Academy	Zografou, Greece
F	7	John Squire	6 ft 8 in (2.03 m)	220 lb (100 kg)	So	CC of San Francisco	Sausalito, CA
G	8	KiJan Robinson	6 ft 3 in (1.91 m)	175 lb (79 kg)	Jr	Hofstra	Apopka, FL
G	10	Comeh Emuobor	6 ft 5 in (1.96 m)	205 lb (93 kg)	Jr	Iona	Raleigh, NC
G	11	Nicholas Sanford	6 ft 1 in (1.85 m)	178 lb (81 kg)	So	Brophy College Prep	Phoenix, AZ
G	14	Antoni Siewruk	6 ft 9 in (2.06 m)	193 lb (88 kg)	So	SMS PZKosz Władysławowo	Koszalin, Poland
F	15	Davide Poser	6 ft 4 in (1.93 m)	206 lb (93 kg)	Jr	Pallacanestro Bernareggio 99	Veneto, Italy
F	23	Belal El Shakery	6 ft 8 in (2.03 m)	230 lb (104 kg)	Jr	Wofford	Alexandria, Egypt
F	24	Jon O’Neill	6 ft 9 in (2.06 m)	216 lb (98 kg)	So	Kaukauna HS	Kaukauna, WI

Head coach

- Nathan Davis (Randolph–Macon)

Assistant coach(es)

- Tyler Wilson (Manhattan)
- Luis Guzman (Temple)
- Matt Miller (St. Mary's (MD))
- Kevin Nichols (Louisville)

Legend

- (C) Team captain
- (S) Suspended
- (I) Ineligible
- (W) Walk-on
- Injured
- Current redshirt

Roster
Last update: November 5, 2025

== Schedule and results ==
Date time, TV	Rank^{#}	Opponent^{#}	Result	Record	Site (attendance) city, state
Non-conference regular season
November 3, 2025*; 7:00 p.m., ACCNX		at Clemson	L 38–88	0–1	Littlejohn Coliseum (7,439); Clemson, SC
November 6, 2025*; 6:00 p.m., ESPN+		Curry	W 113–31	1–1	Lundholm Gym (271); Durham, NH
November 9, 2025*; 12:00 p.m., ESPN+		at Harvard	L 75–86	1–2	Lavietes Pavilion (784); Boston, MA
November 12, 2025*; 7:00 p.m., ESPN+		Emmanuel	W 97–69	2–2	Lundholm Gym (317); Durham, NH
November 15, 2025*; 2:00 p.m., ESPN+		at George Mason	L 44–61	2–3	EagleBank Arena (2,505); Fairfax, VA
November 18, 2025*; 7:00 p.m., ESPN+		at Providence	L 66–98	2–4	Amica Mutual Pavilion (8,852); Providence, RI
November 26, 2025*; 1:00 p.m., ESPN+		Brown	L 47–59	2–5	Lundholm Gym (302); Durham, NH
November 30, 2025*; 2:00 pm, ESPN+		at Fairfield	L 68–72	2–6	Leo D. Mahoney Arena (1,402); Fairfield, CT
December 3, 2025*; 7:00 p.m., ESPN+		at Dartmouth; Rivalry	L 68–69	2–7	Leede Arena (864); Hanover, NH
December 6, 2025*; 7:00 p.m., ESPN+		Boston University	W 88–82 ^{OT}	3–7	Lundholm Gym (469); Durham, NH
December 17, 2025*; 6:00 p.m., ESPN+		Stonehill	W 59–58	4–7	Lundholm Gym (297); Durham, NH
December 21, 2025*; 3:00 p.m., ESPN+		at Saint Louis	L 79–93	4–8	Chaifetz Arena (5,908); St. Louis
December 30, 2025*; 9:00 p.m., BTN		at No. 13 Nebraska	L 55–86	4–9	Pinnacle Bank Arena (14,497); Lincoln, NE
America East regular season
January 3, 2026; 1:00 p.m., ESPN+		Vermont	L 61–80	4–10 (0–1)	Lundholm Gym (813); Durham, NH
January 8, 2026; 7:00 p.m., ESPN+		at NJIT	L 76–80	4–11 (0–2)	Wellness and Events Center (220); Newark, NJ
January 10, 2026; 1:00 p.m., ESPN+		at UMBC	L 74–75	4–12 (0–3)	Chesapeake Employers Insurance Arena (1,350); Catonsville, MD
January 19, 2026; 2:00 p.m., ESPN+		at Maine	W 65–48	5–12 (1–3)	Memorial Gymnasium (1,157); Orono, ME
January 22, 2026; 6:00 p.m., ESPN+		Binghamton	W 88–82 ^{3OT}	6–12 (2–3)	Lundholm Gym (268); Durham, NH
January 24, 2026; 2:00 p.m., ESPN+		Albany	W 80–72	7–12 (3–3)	Lundholm Gym (574); Durham, NH
January 29, 2026; 6:00 p.m., ESPN+		UMass Lowell	W 66–61	8–12 (4–3)	Lundholm Gym (505); Durham, NH
January 31, 2026; 4:00 p.m., ESPN+		at Bryant	L 84–92	8–13 (4–4)	Chace Athletic Center (511); Smithfield, RI
February 7, 2026; 1:30 p.m., ESPN+		at Vermont	L 57–80	8–14 (4–5)	Patrick Gym (2,522); Burlington, VT
February 12, 2026; 6:00 p.m., ESPN+		NJIT	L 70–76	8–15 (4–6)	Lundholm Gym (338); Durham, NH
February 14, 2026; 1:00 p.m., ESPN+		UMBC	L 63–85	8–16 (4–7)	Lundholm Gym (442); Durham, NH
February 19, 2026; 6:00 p.m., ESPN+		UMass Lowell	L 56–78	8–17 (4–8)	Kennedy Family Athletic Complex (787); Lowell, MA
February 21, 2026; 4:00 p.m., ESPN+		Maine	L 58–61	8–18 (4–9)	Lundholm Gym (372); Durham, NH
February 26, 2026; 6:07 p.m., ESPN+		at Binghamton	L 63–65	8–19 (4–10)	Dr. Bai Lee Court (1,436); Vestal, NY
February 28, 2026; 2:00 p.m., ESPN+		at Albany	L 61–84	8–20 (4–11)	Broadview Center (2,034); Albany, NY
March 3, 2026; 6:00 p.m., ESPN+		Bryant	W 88–83 ^{2OT}	9–20 (5–11)	Lundholm Gym (280); Durham, NH
America East tournament
March 7, 2026; 1:00 p.m., ESPN+	(8)	at (1) UMBC; Quarterfinals	L 69–84	9–21	Chesapeake Employers Insurance Arena (2,652); Catonsville, MD
*Non-conference game. ^{#}Rankings from AP poll. (#) Tournament seedings in parentheses. All times are in Eastern.
