= 2025–26 Binghamton Bearcats men's basketball team =

American college basketball season

2025–26 Binghamton Bearcats men's basketball
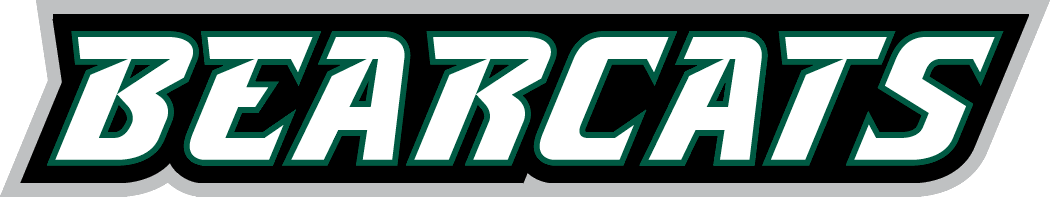
- Conference: America East Conference
- Record: 8–23 (4–12 America East)
- Head coach: Levell Sanders (5th season)
- Associate head coach: Brian Johnson
- Assistant coaches: Marlon Guild; Damani Myers
- Home arena: Dr. Bai Lee Court

2025–26 America East Conference men's basketball standings
	Conf.				Overall
Team	W		L	PCT	W		L	PCT
UMBC	13	–	2	.867	20	–	8	.714
Vermont	11	–	4	.733	19	–	11	.633
NJIT	10	–	5	.667	15	–	15	.500
UMass Lowell	8	–	7	.533	13	–	17	.433
Albany	7	–	8	.467	11	–	19	.367
Maine	6	–	9	.400	8	–	22	.267
Bryant	5	–	10	.333	9	–	20	.310
New Hampshire	4	–	11	.267	8	–	20	.286
Binghamton	4	–	12	.250	8	–	23	.258
† 2026 AmEast tournament winner As of February 28, 2026

The 2025–26 Binghamton Bearcats men's basketball team represented Binghamton University during the 2025–26 NCAA Division I men's basketball season. The Bearcats, led by fifth-year head coach Levell Sanders, played their home games on Dr. Bai Lee Court in the Binghamton University Events Center in Vestal, New York as members of the America East Conference.

The Bearcats finished ninth (last) in the America East Conference standings with a record of 4–12 and were the lone team in the conference not to qualify for the 2026 America East men's basketball tournament, thus eliminating them from making the NCAA Division I men's basketball tournament.

== Previous season ==
The Bearcats finished the 2024–25 season 15–17, 7–9 in America East play, to finish in fifth place. They were defeated by Albany in the quarterfinals of the America East tournament.

== Preseason ==
On October 20, 2025, the America East Conference released their preseason polls. Binghamton was picked to finish fifth in the conference.

=== Preseason rankings ===
America East Preseason Poll
Place	Team	Votes
1	Vermont	63 (7)
T–2	Maine	47 (1)
T–2	Albany	47
4	UMass Lowell	39 (1)
5	Binghamton	37
6	Bryant	35
7	UMBC	31
8	NJIT	13
9	New Hampshire	12
(#) first-place votes

=== Preseason All-America East Team ===
Preseason All-America East Team
Player	Year	Position
Demetrius Lilley	Senior	Center

== Roster ==
2025–26 Binghamton Bearcats men's basketball team
Players
Coaches

Pos.	#	Name	Height	Weight	Year	Previous school	Hometown
G	0	Jeremiah Quigley	5 ft 11 in (1.8 m)	170 lb (77 kg)	Jr	George Mason	Accokeek, MD
G	1	Jayden Lemond	6 ft 4 in (1.93 m)	185 lb (84 kg)	Jr	William & Mary	Marietta, GA
G	2	Jayden Kelsey	6 ft 7 in (2.01 m)	210 lb (95 kg)	Fr	Westtown School	Phoenixville, PA
G	3	Evan Ashe	6 ft 3 in (1.91 m)	190 lb (86 kg)	Jr	The Winchendon School	Charlotte, NC
G	4	Ryan Richardson	6 ft 5 in (1.96 m)	200 lb (91 kg)	Jr	Missouri State–West Plains	Hollywood, FL
G	5	Wes Peterson Jr.	6 ft 6 in (1.98 m)	205 lb (93 kg)	Sr	Delaware	Alexandria, VA
F	10	Zyier Beverly	6 ft 9 in (2.06 m)	200 lb (91 kg)	Jr	East LA College	Los Angeles, CA
G	12	Nevin Ibroci	6 ft 2 in (1.88 m)	170 lb (77 kg)	RS Fr	Oral Roberts	Staten Island, NY
F	13	Stephan Snagg	6 ft 8 in (2.03 m)	220 lb (100 kg)	RS So	New Hampton School	Queens, NY
C	14	Demetrius Lilley	6 ft 9 in (2.06 m)	220 lb (100 kg)	Sr	La Salle	Philadelphia, PA
G	15	Bryson Wilson	6 ft 5 in (1.96 m)	200 lb (91 kg)	Jr	Buffalo	Washington, D.C.
G	24	Jackson Benigni	6 ft 1 in (1.85 m)	180 lb (82 kg)	GS	Stonehill	East Hampton, CT
G	30	Jake Blackburn	6 ft 5 in (1.96 m)	200 lb (91 kg)	Fr	Worcester Academy	Southborough, MA
F	33	Sayerr Senghore	6 ft 8 in (2.03 m)	205 lb (93 kg)	Sr	Fort Valley State	Woodinville, WA

Head coach

- Levell Sanders (Seton Hall)

Assistant coach(es)

- Brian Johnson (Delaware)
- Marlon Guild (Hartford)
- Damani Myers (Saint Peter's)

Legend

- (C) Team captain
- (S) Suspended
- (I) Ineligible
- (W) Walk-on
- Injured
- Current redshirt

Roster
Last update: October 30, 2025

== Schedule and results ==
Date time, TV	Rank^{#}	Opponent^{#}	Result	Record	Site (attendance) city, state
Non-conference regular season
November 3, 2025*; 7:00 p.m., ACCNX		at Syracuse	L 47–85	0–1	JMA Wireless Dome (18,762); Syracuse, NY
November 5, 2025*; 6:07 p.m., ESPN+		RIT	W 66–56	1–1	Dr. Bai Lee Court (1,435); Vestal, NY
November 8, 2025*; 2:00 p.m., ESPN+		Niagara	L 59–67	1–2	Dr. Bai Lee Court (1,519); Vestal, NY
November 12, 2025*; 6:30 p.m., ESPN+		at Georgetown	L 70–83	1–3	Capital One Arena (3,391); Washington, D.C.
November 15, 2025*; 3:00 p.m., ESPN+		at Longwood	L 82–90	1–4	Joan Perry Brock Center (3,009); Farmville, VA
November 19, 2025*; 6:07 p.m., ESPN+		Misericordia	W 69–58	2–4	Dr. Bai Lee Court (1,315); Vestal, NY
November 22, 2025*; 3:00 p.m.		vs. Maryland Eastern Shore; Queen City Classic	L 52–63	2–5	Koessler Athletic Center (261); Buffalo, NY
November 23, 2025*; 1:00 p.m., ESPN+		at Canisius; Queen City Classic	L 66–75	2–6	Koessler Athletic Center (677); Buffalo, NY
December 2, 2025*; 7:00 p.m., ESPN+		Lehigh	W 80–71 ^{OT}	3–6	Dr. Bai Lee Court (1,254); Vestal, NY
December 6, 2025*; 4:00 p.m., ESPN+		Le Moyne	L 63–78	3–7	Dr. Bai Lee Court (1,752); Vestal, NY
December 13, 2025*; 4:00 p.m., ESPN+		Central Connecticut	L 67–84	3–8	Dr. Bai Lee Court (1,624); Vestal, NY
December 17, 2025*; 7:00 p.m., ACCNX		at Pittsburgh	L 63–103	3–9	Petersen Events Center (4,687); Pittsburgh, PA
December 20, 2025*; 2:00 p.m., NECFR		at Mercyhurst	L 61−82	3−10	Mercyhurst Athletic Center (182); Erie, PA
December 23, 2025*; 12:00 p.m., ESPN+		at Army	L 85–95 ^{OT}	3–11	Christl Arena (841); West Point, NY
December 29, 2025*; 4:00 p.m., ESPN+		Elmira College	W 100–60	4–11	Dr. Bai Lee Court (1,604); Vestal, NY
America East regular season
January 3, 2026; 2:00 p.m., ESPN+		NJIT	L 65–73	4–12 (0–1)	Dr. Bai Lee Court (1,456); Vestal, NY
January 8, 2026; 7:00 p.m., ESPN+		at Vermont	L 59–60	4–13 (0–2)	Patrick Gym (1,874); Burlington, VT
January 10, 2026; 2:00 p.m., ESPN+		UMass Lowell	L 68–73	4–14 (0–3)	Dr. Bai Lee Court (1,651); Vestal, NY
January 15, 2026; 6:30 p.m., ESPN+		at Albany	L 53–69	4–15 (0–4)	Broadview Center (1,120); Albany, NY
January 19, 2026; 2:00 p.m., ESPN+		UMBC	L 60–78	4–16 (0–5)	Dr. Bai Lee Court (1,953); Vestal, NY
January 22, 2026; 6:00 p.m., ESPN+		at New Hampshire	L 82–88 ^{3OT}	4–17 (0–6)	Lundholm Gym (268); Durham, NH
January 24, 2026; 2:00 p.m., ESPN+		at Maine	L 63–79	4–18 (0–7)	Memorial Gymnasium (1,276); Orono, ME
January 29, 2026; 6:07 p.m., ESPN+		Bryant	W 63–60	5–18 (1–7)	Dr. Bai Lee Court (1,658); Vestal, NY
February 5, 2026; 6:00 p.m., ESPN+		at UMBC	L 62–79	5–19 (1–8)	Chesapeake Employers Insurance Arena (1,039); Baltimore, MD
February 7, 2026; 4:00 p.m., ESPN+		at NJIT	L 64–73	5–20 (1–9)	Wellness and Events Center (430); Newark, NJ
February 12, 2026; 6:30 p.m., ESPN+		Vermont	L 65–73	5–21 (1–10)	Dr. Bai Lee Court (1,641); Vestal, NY
February 14, 2026; 4:00 p.m., ESPN+		Albany	L 74–77	5–22 (1–11)	Dr. Bai Lee Court (1,839); Vestal, NY
February 19, 2026; 6:00 p.m., ESPN+		at Bryant	W 79–67	6–22 (2–11)	Chace Athletic Center; Smithfield, RI
February 21, 2026; 1:00 p.m., ESPN+		at UMass Lowell	L 79–92	6–23 (2–12)	Kennedy Family Athletic Complex (957); Lowell, MA
February 26, 2026; 6:07 p.m., ESPN+		New Hampshire	W 65–63	7–23 (3–12)	Dr. Bai Lee Court (1,436); Vestal, NY
February 28, 2026; 2:00 p.m., ESPN+		Maine	W 74–67	8–23 (4–12)	Dr. Bai Lee Court (1,959); Vestal, NY
*Non-conference game. ^{#}Rankings from AP poll. (#) Tournament seedings in parentheses. All times are in Eastern.
