= 2025–26 Bryant Bulldogs men's basketball team =

American college basketball season

2025–26 Bryant Bulldogs men's basketball
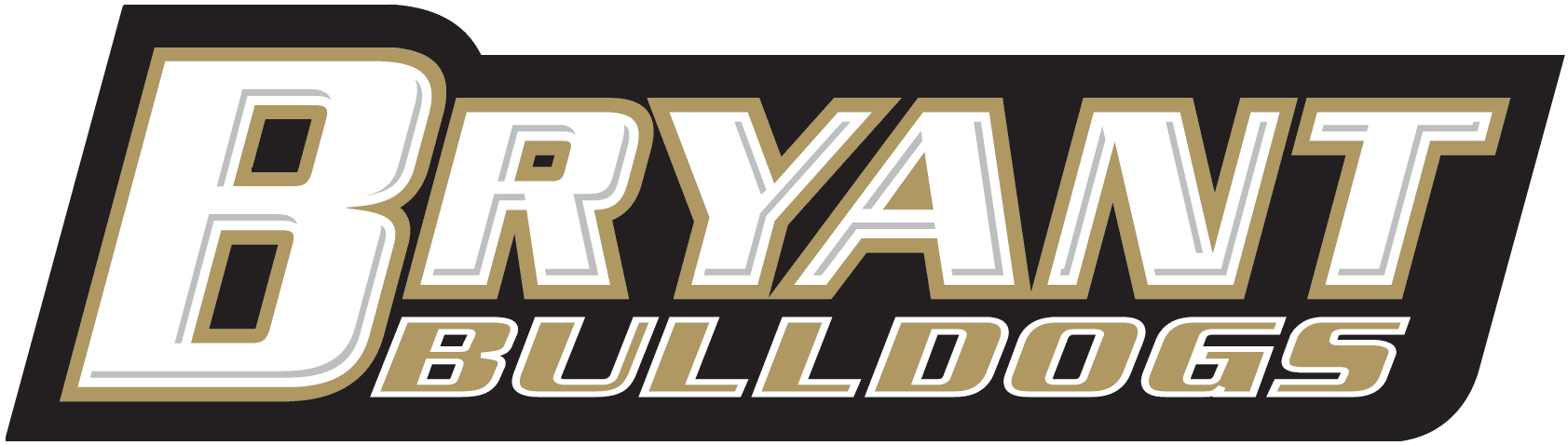
- Conference: America East Conference
- Record: 9–22 (5–11 America East)
- Head coach: Jamion Christian (1st season)
- Associate head coach: Harley Fuller
- Assistant coaches: Brian Merritt; Bruce Shingler; Derrick Wall
- Home arena: Chace Athletic Center

2025–26 America East Conference men's basketball standings
	Conf.				Overall
Team	W		L	PCT	W		L	PCT
UMBC	14	–	2	.875	21	–	8	.724
Vermont	12	–	4	.750	20	–	11	.645
NJIT	10	–	6	.625	15	–	16	.484
UMass Lowell	9	–	7	.563	14	–	17	.452
Albany	7	–	9	.438	11	–	20	.355
Maine	6	–	10	.375	8	–	23	.258
Bryant	5	–	11	.313	9	–	21	.300
New Hampshire	5	–	11	.313	9	–	20	.310
Binghamton	4	–	12	.250	8	–	23	.258
† 2026 AmEast tournament winner As of March 3, 2026

The 2025–26 Bryant Bulldogs men's basketball team represented Bryant University during the 2025–26 NCAA Division I men's basketball season. The Bulldogs, led by first-year head coach Jamion Christian, played their home games at the Chace Athletic Center in Smithfield, Rhode Island as members of the America East Conference.

== Previous season ==
The Bulldogs finished the 2024–25 season 23–12, 14–2 in America East play to finish as America East regular-season champions. They defeated UMBC, Albany and Maine to win the America East tournament championship. As a result, they received the conference’s automatic bid to the NCAA tournament as the No. 15 seed in the South region, where they would lose in the first round to No. 2 seed Michigan State.

Following the season, head coach Phil Martelli Jr. left the school to accept the head coaching position at VCU. On April 3, Pallacanestro Trieste head coach and former NCAA Division I head coach Jamion Christian was hired to be Bryant’s next head coach.

== Preseason ==
On October 20, 2025, the America East Conference released their preseason polls. Bryant was picked to finish sixth in the conference.

=== Preseason rankings ===
America East Preseason Poll
Place	Team	Votes
1	Vermont	63 (7)
T–2	Maine	47 (1)
T–2	Albany	47
4	UMass Lowell	39 (1)
5	Binghamton	37
6	Bryant	35
7	UMBC	31
8	NJIT	13
9	New Hampshire	12
(#) first-place votes

=== Preseason All-America East Team ===
Preseason All-America East Team
Player	Year	Position
Quincy Allen	Fifth-year Senior	Guard

== Roster ==
2025–26 Bryant Bulldogs men's basketball team
Players
Coaches

Pos.	#	Name	Height	Weight	Year	Previous school	Hometown
F	0	Ashley Sims II	6 ft 8 in (2.03 m)	230 lb (104 kg)	Fr	Riverdale Baptist School	Glen Burnie, MD
G	1	Ty Tabales	6 ft 2 in (1.88 m)	170 lb (77 kg)	Fr	New Hampton School	Worcester, MA
F	2	Khalil Williams	6 ft 5 in (1.96 m)	190 lb (86 kg)	So	Hargrave Military Academy	Washington, D.C.
F	3	Aaron Davis	6 ft 7 in (2.01 m)	215 lb (98 kg)	Jr	First Love Christian Academy	Bay Shore, NY
G	4	Quincy Allen (5Y)	6 ft 8 in (2.03 m)	205 lb (93 kg)	Sr	Chicago State	Silver Spring, MD
G	5	Jaheim Nyam	6 ft 3 in (1.91 m)	190 lb (86 kg)	Jr	Kilgore College	Paris, France
G	6	Langston Bailey	5 ft 9 in (1.75 m)	142 lb (64 kg)	So	Springdale Prep	Riverdale, MD
G	7	Joe Green	6 ft 3 in (1.91 m)	185 lb (84 kg)	Fr	Mount Saint Joseph HS	Baltimore, MD
F	8	Lennart Weber	6 ft 8 in (2.03 m)	220 lb (100 kg)	GS	Toronto	Munich, Germany
F	9	Gio Sanford	6 ft 4 in (1.93 m)	185 lb (84 kg)	Fr	Riverdale Baptist School	Glenn Dale, MD
F	10	Daniel Akoue	6 ft 11 in (2.11 m)	210 lb (95 kg)	Fr	Southern Coast Academy	Libreville, Gabon
F	11	Ethane Bourgade	6 ft 9 in (2.06 m)	220 lb (100 kg)	Fr	Tours Métropole Basket	Le Mans, France
G	13	Jakai Robinson	6 ft 5 in (1.96 m)	208 lb (94 kg)	Sr	Miami (FL)	Ossining, NY
F	14	Keegan Harvey (5Y)	6 ft 11 in (2.11 m)	230 lb (104 kg)	Sr	George Washington	Newcastle, Australia
G	21	Frankie Vassalluzzo	6 ft 0 in (1.83 m)	175 lb (79 kg)	So	Pine Crest School	Boca Raton, FL
F	22	Jason Sepe	6 ft 3 in (1.91 m)	170 lb (77 kg)	So	Ponaganset HS	Foster, RI
G	25	Reed Woerner	6 ft 3 in (1.91 m)	190 lb (86 kg)	Fr	Shepaug Valley School	Bridgewater, CT
G	30	Michael DeOrsey	5 ft 11 in (1.8 m)	170 lb (77 kg)	Fr	North Kingstown HS	North Kingstown, RI
F	99	Timofei Rudovskii	6 ft 9 in (2.06 m)	215 lb (98 kg)	Fr	Dream City Christian School	Moscow, Russia

Head coach

- Jamion Christian (Mount St. Mary's)

Assistant coach(es)

- Harley Fuller (Molloy)
- Brian Merritt (Towson)
- Bruce Shingler (St. Augustine's)
- Derrick Wall (UNC Pembroke)

Legend

- (C) Team captain
- (S) Suspended
- (I) Ineligible
- (W) Walk-on
- (5Y) Fifth-year senior
- Injured
- Current redshirt

Roster
Last update: November 2, 2025

== Schedule and results ==
Date time, TV	Rank^{#}	Opponent^{#}	Result	Record	Site (attendance) city, state
Non-conference regular season
November 3, 2025*; 7:00 p.m., ESPN+		at Siena	L 66–82	0–1	MVP Arena (4,072); Albany, NY
November 7, 2025*; 7:30 p.m., ACCNX		at Georgia Tech	L 45–74	0–2	McCamish Pavilion (4,886); Atlanta, GA
November 12, 2025*; 8:30 p.m., ESPN+		Dartmouth	W 82–75	1–2	Chace Athletic Center (783); Smithfield, RI
November 16, 2025*; 1:00 p.m., ESPN+		at Valparaiso	L 50–68	1–3	Athletics–Recreation Center (980); Valparaiso, IN
November 19, 2025*; 7:00 p.m., ACCNX		at Virginia Tech	L 61–78	1–4	Cassell Coliseum (5,410); Blacksburg, VA
November 23, 2025*; 6:00 p.m., TruTV		at No. 3 UConn	L 49–72	1–5	PeoplesBank Arena (15,495); Hartford, CT
November 26, 2025*; 11:00 a.m., ESPN+		Mercy	W 87–61	2–5	Chace Athletic Center (304); Smithfield, RI
November 29, 2025*; 2:00 p.m., ESPN+		at Harvard	L 53–56	2–6	Lavietes Pavilion (1,022); Boston, MA
December 2, 2025*; 6:00 p.m., ESPN+		Stonehill	W 77–65	3–6	Chace Athletic Center (300); Smithfield, RI
December 5, 2025*; 7:00 p.m., ESPN+		at Brown	L 56–75	3–7	Pizzitola Sports Center (610); Providence, RI
December 10, 2025*; 7:00 p.m., ESPN+		at Iona	L 63−69	3−8	Hynes Athletics Center (1,347); New Rochelle, NY
December 13, 2025*; 4:00 p.m., ESPN+		Marist	L 74−82	3−9	Chace Athletic Center (674); Smithfield, RI
December 22, 2025*; 7:00 p.m., ESPN+		at High Point	L 47–93	3–10	Qubein Center (1,973); High Point, NC
December 28, 2025*; 1:00 p.m., ESPN+		Worcester State	W 95–59	4–10	Chace Athletic Center (447); Smithfield, RI
America East regular season
January 3, 2026; 2:00 p.m., ESPN+		at Maine	W 56–51	5–10 (1–0)	Memorial Gymnasium (1,131); Orono, ME
January 8, 2026; 6:00 p.m., ESPN+		UMass Lowell	L 63–77	5–11 (1–1)	Chace Athletic Center (274); Smithfield, RI
January 10, 2026; 2:00 p.m., ESPN+		at Albany	L 46–71	5–12 (1–2)	Broadview Center (1,510); Albany, NY
January 15, 2026; 6:00 p.m., ESPN+		UMBC	W 79–74 ^{OT}	6–12 (2–2)	Chace Athletic Center (670); Smithfield, RI
January 19, 2026; 2:00 p.m., ESPN+		at NJIT	L 55–79	6–13 (2–3)	Wellness and Events Center (545); Newark, NJ
January 24, 2026; 1:00 p.m., ESPN+		Vermont	L 52–62	6–14 (2–4)	Chace Athletic Center (844); Smithfield, RI
January 29, 2026; 6:07 p.m., ESPN+		at Binghamton	L 60–63	6–15 (2–5)	Dr. Bai Lee Court (1,658); Vestal, NY
January 31, 2026; 4:00 p.m., ESPN+		New Hampshire	W 92–84	7–15 (3–5)	Chace Athletic Center (511); Smithfield, RI
February 5, 2026; 6:00 p.m., ESPN+		Albany	L 63–65	7–16 (3–6)	Chace Athletic Center (200); Smithfield, RI
February 7, 2026; 4:00 p.m., ESPN+		Maine	W 73–67	8–16 (4–6)	Chace Athletic Center (575); Smithfield, RI
February 12, 2026; 6:00 p.m., ESPN+		at UMass Lowell	L 69–88	8–17 (4–7)	Kennedy Family Athletic Complex (549); Lowell, MA
February 14, 2026; 2:00 p.m., ESPN+		at Vermont	L 63–90	8–18 (4–8)	Patrick Gym (2,327); Burlington, VT
February 19, 2026; 6:00 p.m., ESPN+		Binghamton	L 67–79	8–19 (4–9)	Chace Athletic Center; Smithfield, RI
February 26, 2026; 6:00 p.m., ESPN+		at UMBC	L 58–70	8–20 (4–10)	Chesapeake Employers Insurance Arena (1,692); Catonsville, MD
February 28, 2026; 4:00 p.m., ESPN+		NJIT	W 69–52	9–20 (5–10)	Chace Athletic Center (722); Smithfield, RI
March 3, 2026; 6:00 p.m., ESPN+		at New Hampshire	L 83–88 ^{2OT}	9–21 (5–11)	Lundholm Gym (280); Durham, NH
America East tournament
March 7, 2026; 2:00 p.m., ESPN+	(7)	at (2) Vermont; Quarterfinals	L 57–77	9–22	Patrick Gym (1,936); Burlington, VT
*Non-conference game. ^{#}Rankings from AP poll. (#) Tournament seedings in parentheses. All times are in Eastern.
