= 2026 America East men's basketball tournament =

American college basketball postseason tournament

- Classification: Division I
- Season: 2025–26
- Teams: 8
- Site: Campus sites
- Champions: UMBC (3rd title)
- Winning coach: Jim Ferry (1st title)
- MVP: DJ Armstrong Jr. (UMBC)
- Television: ESPN+, ESPN2

2025–26 America East Conference men's basketball standings
	Conf.				Overall
Team	W		L	PCT	W		L	PCT
UMBC †	14	–	2	.875	24	–	9	.727
Vermont	12	–	4	.750	22	–	12	.647
NJIT	10	–	6	.625	16	–	17	.485
UMass Lowell	9	–	7	.563	15	–	18	.455
Albany	7	–	9	.438	11	–	21	.344
Maine	6	–	10	.375	8	–	24	.250
Bryant	5	–	11	.313	9	–	22	.290
New Hampshire	5	–	11	.313	9	–	21	.300
Binghamton	4	–	12	.250	8	–	23	.258
† 2026 AmEast tournament winner

The 2026 America East Men's Basketball Conference tournament was the 2026 postseason men's basketball tournament for the America East Conference. It was held March 7–14, 2026, at campus sites of the higher seeds. The winner, UMBC, received the conference's automatic bid to the 2026 NCAA Tournament. The tournament was sponsored by the United States Air Force Reserve and officially known as the 2026 Air Force Reserve America East Men's Basketball Playoffs.

== Seeds ==
Eight of the nine America East teams qualified for the tournament. The teams were seeded by record in conference, with a tiebreaker system to seed teams with identical conference records.

Seed	School	AEC Record	Tiebreaker
1	UMBC	14–2	
2	Vermont	12–4	
3	NJIT	10–6	
4	UMass Lowell	9–7	
5	Albany	7–9	
6	Maine	6–10	
7	Bryant	5–11	1–1 vs. UMBC
8	New Hampshire	5–11	0–2 vs. UMBC
DNQ	Binghamton	4–12	

== Schedule ==
Game	Time*	Matchup^{#}	Score	Television
Quarterfinals – Saturday, March 7
1	1:00 pm	No. 8 New Hampshire at No. 1 UMBC	69–84	ESPN+
2	1:00 pm	No. 5 Albany at No. 4 UMass Lowell	76–81	ESPN+
3	2:00 pm	No. 7 Bryant at No. 2 Vermont	57–77	ESPN+
4	4:00 pm	No. 6 Maine at No. 3 NJIT	58–60	ESPN+
Semifinals – Tuesday, March 10
5	6:00 pm	No. 4 UMass Lowell at No. 1 UMBC	69–91	ESPN+
6	7:00 pm	No. 3 NJIT at No. 2 Vermont	54–63	ESPN+
Championship – Saturday, March 14
7	11:00 am	No. 2 Vermont at No. 1 UMBC	59–74	ESPN2
*Game times in EST. #-Rankings denote tournament seeding.

== Bracket ==
Quarterfinals; Saturday, March 7 ESPN+
1	UMBC	84
8	New Hampshire	69
4	UMass Lowell	81
5	Albany	76
(Pairings are reseeded after the first round)
2	Vermont	77
7	Bryant	57
3	NJIT	60
6	Maine	58

Semifinals; Tuesday, March 10; ESPN+
1	UMBC	91
4	UMass Lowell	69
2	Vermont	63
3	NJIT	54

Championship; Saturday, March 14; ESPN2
1	UMBC	74
2	Vermont	59

== Awards and Honors ==
=== All-Tournament Team ===
Player	Team
**DJ Armstrong Jr.**	UMBC
Ace Valentine	UMBC
Jose Roberto Tanchyn	UMBC
TJ Hurley	Vermont
TJ Long	Vermont

MVP in bold

== See also ==
- 2026 America East women's basketball tournament
