= 2025–26 UMBC Retrievers men's basketball team =

American college basketball season

2025–26 UMBC Retrievers men's basketball
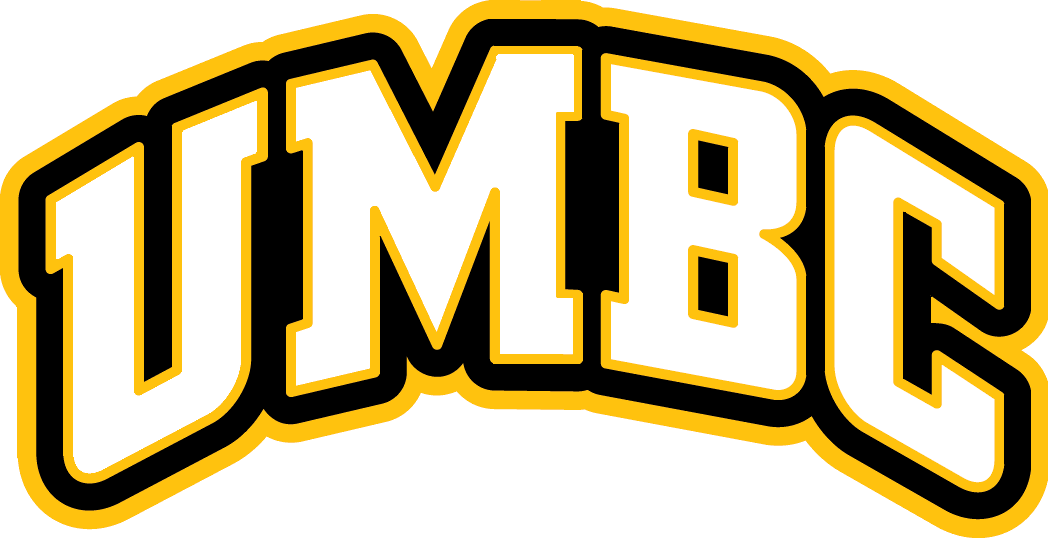

America East regular season and tournament champions

NCAA tournament, First Four
- Conference: America East Conference
- Record: 24–9 (14–2 America East)
- Head coach: Jim Ferry (5th season)
- Assistant coaches: Danny Lawson; Evann Baker; Ceasar Adim; Gabe Maturo; Ethan Lynch
- Home arena: Chesapeake Employers Insurance Arena

2025–26 America East Conference men's basketball standings
	Conf.				Overall
Team	W		L	PCT	W		L	PCT
UMBC †	14	–	2	.875	24	–	9	.727
Vermont	12	–	4	.750	22	–	12	.647
NJIT	10	–	6	.625	16	–	17	.485
UMass Lowell	9	–	7	.563	15	–	18	.455
Albany	7	–	9	.438	11	–	21	.344
Maine	6	–	10	.375	8	–	24	.250
Bryant	5	–	11	.313	9	–	22	.290
New Hampshire	5	–	11	.313	9	–	21	.300
Binghamton	4	–	12	.250	8	–	23	.258
† 2026 AmEast tournament winner

The 2025–26 UMBC Retrievers men's basketball team represented the University of Maryland, Baltimore County during the 2025–26 NCAA Division I men's basketball season. The Retrievers, led by fifth-year head coach Jim Ferry, played their home games at the Chesapeake Employers Insurance Arena in Catonsville, Maryland as members of the America East Conference. They finished the season 24–9, 14–2 in America East play to win the regular season championship. They defeated New Hampshire, UMass Lowell, and Vermont to win the America East tournament championship. As a result, the Retrievers received the conference's automatic bid to the NCAA tournament, where they lost to Howard in the First Four.

== Previous season ==
The Retrievers finished the 2024–25 season 13–19, 5–11 in America East play, to finish in eighth place. They were defeated by Bryant in the quarterfinals of the America East tournament.

== Preseason ==
On October 20, 2025, the America East Conference released their preseason polls. UMBC was picked to finish seventh in the conference.

=== Preseason rankings ===
America East Preseason Poll
Place	Team	Votes
1	Vermont	63 (7)
T–2	Maine	47 (1)
T–2	Albany	47
4	UMass Lowell	39 (1)
5	Binghamton	37
6	Bryant	35
7	UMBC	31
8	NJIT	13
9	New Hampshire	12
(#) first-place votes

=== Preseason All-America East Team ===
Preseason All-America East Team
Player	Year	Position
Josh Odunowo	Graduate	Forward

== Roster ==
2025–26 UMBC Retrievers men's basketball team
Players
Coaches

Pos.	#	Name	Height	Weight	Year	Previous school	Hometown
F	0	Regimantas Ciunys	6 ft 6 in (1.98 m)	200 lb (91 kg)	Sr	The Harvey School	Vilnius, Lithuania
G	1	Ace Valentine	6 ft 3 in (1.91 m)	195 lb (88 kg)	Jr	Mount Saint Joseph HS	Columbia, MD
F	2	Josh Odunowo	6 ft 6 in (1.98 m)	215 lb (98 kg)	GS	Columbia	Laurel, MD
G/F	3	DJ Armstrong Jr.	6 ft 4 in (1.93 m)	190 lb (86 kg)	GS	UT Permian Basin	Orlando, FL
G	4	Jah’Likai King	6 ft 2 in (1.88 m)	160 lb (73 kg)	Jr	New Haven	Newburgh, NY
F	5	Daylon Dickerson	6 ft 6 in (1.98 m)	205 lb (93 kg)	Jr	Kaufman HS	Kaufman, TX
F	7	Tim Eze	6 ft 7 in (2.01 m)	210 lb (95 kg)	So	Bill Crothers Prep	Kleinburg, ON
F	10	Paul Greene	6 ft 6 in (1.98 m)	195 lb (88 kg)	GS	Southern New Hampshire	Freeport, Bahamas
F	11	Caden Diggs	6 ft 8 in (2.03 m)	195 lb (88 kg)	So	Old Dominion	Waldorf, MD
G/F	12	Jake Stout	6 ft 7 in (2.01 m)	200 lb (91 kg)	So	Boys' Latin School of Maryland	Catonsville, MD
G	13	Devin Ceaser	6 ft 1 in (1.85 m)	175 lb (79 kg)	Sr	Old Dominion	Waldorf, MD
F	14	Jose Roberto Tanchyn	6 ft 10 in (2.08 m)	235 lb (107 kg)	Jr	Palm Beach Atlantic	Córdoba, Spain
G	21	Cougar Downing (5Y)	6 ft 2 in (1.88 m)	180 lb (82 kg)	RS Sr	Eastern New Mexico	Atchison, KS
F	23	Riley Jacobs	6 ft 9 in (2.06 m)	205 lb (93 kg)	Fr	St. Stephen's & St. Agnes School	Alexandria, VA
G	30	Saahil Thakkar	6 ft 1 in (1.85 m)	165 lb (75 kg)	Fr	Northwest HS	Germantown, MD

Head coach

- Jim Ferry (Keene State)

Assistant coach(es)

- Danny Lawson (Bentley)
- Evann Baker (Quinnipiac)
- Ceasar Adim (UMass)
- Gabe Maturo (UMBC)
- Ethan Lynch (UMBC)

Legend

- (C) Team captain
- (S) Suspended
- (I) Ineligible
- (W) Walk-on
- (5Y) Fifth-year senior
- Injured
- Current redshirt

Roster
Last update: November 6, 2025

== Schedule and results ==
Date time, TV	Rank^{#}	Opponent^{#}	Result	Record	Site (attendance) city, state
Exhibition
October 27, 2025*; 7:00 p.m., B1G+		at Maryland	L 81–82	–	Xfinity Center (11,410); College Park, MD
Non-conference regular season
November 4, 2025*; 6:00 p.m., ESPN+		Penn State–York	W 74–53	1–0	Chesapeake Employers Insurance Arena (1,235); Catonsville, MD
November 8, 2025*; 2:00 p.m., ESPN+		at Dayton	L 71–77	1–1	UD Arena (13,407); Dayton, OH
November 11, 2025*; 6:00 p.m.		at Morgan State	W 81–79	2–1	Hill Field House; Baltimore, MD
November 16, 2025*; 12:00 p.m., ESPN+		Wagner	W 71–70 ^{OT}	3–1	Chesapeake Employers Insurance Arena (1,062); Catonsville, MD
November 19, 2025*; 7:00 p.m., ESPN+		at George Washington	L 52–89	3–2	Charles E. Smith Center (1,703); Washington, D.C.
November 24, 2025*; 6:00 p.m., ESPN+		Notre Dame (MD)	W 102–52	4–2	Chesapeake Employers Insurance Arena (756); Catonsville, MD
November 29, 2025*; 2:00 p.m., ESPN+		Delaware State	W 71–57	5–2	Chesapeake Employers Insurance Arena (723); Catonsville, MD
December 3, 2025*; 8:00 pm, TruTV		at Georgetown	L 81–90	5–3	Capital One Arena (3,436); Washington, D.C.
December 6, 2025*; 12:00 p.m., ESPN+		at Bucknell	W 73–66	6–3	Sojka Pavilion (741); Lewisburg, PA
December 9, 2025*; 5:00 p.m., ESPN+		Buffalo	L 79–83	6–4	Chesapeake Employers Insurance Arena (845); Catonsville, MD
December 12, 2025*; 6:00 p.m., ESPN+		Army	L 60–63	6–5	Chesapeake Employers Insurance Arena (1,209); Catonsville, MD
December 21, 2025*; 3:00 p.m., ESPN+		at South Florida	L 69–94	6–6	Yuengling Center (5,509); Tampa, FL
December 29, 2025*; 6:00 p.m., ESPN+		at Coppin State	W 93–59	7–6	Physical Education Complex (379); Baltimore, MD
America East regular season
January 8, 2026; 6:00 p.m., ESPN+		Maine	W 69–62	8–6 (1–0)	Chesapeake Employers Insurance Arena (1,125); Catonsville, MD
January 10, 2026; 1:00 p.m., ESPN+		New Hampshire	W 75–74	9–6 (2–0)	Chesapeake Employers Insurance Arena (1,350); Catonsville, MD
January 15, 2026; 6:00 p.m., ESPN+		at Bryant	L 74–79 ^{OT}	9–7 (2–1)	Chace Athletic Center (670); Smithfield, RI
January 19, 2026; 2:00 p.m., ESPN+		at Binghamton	W 78–60	10–7 (3–1)	Dr. Bai Lee Court (1,953); Vestal, NY
January 22, 2026; 6:00 p.m., ESPN+		NJIT	W 87–74	11–7 (4–1)	Chesapeake Employers Insurance Arena; Catonsville, MD
January 24, 2026; 1:00 p.m., ESPN+		UMass Lowell	W 79–56	12–7 (5–1)	Chesapeake Employers Insurance Arena (1,012); Catonsville, MD
January 29, 2026; 7:00 p.m., ESPN+		at Vermont	L 55–64	12–8 (5–2)	Patrick Gym (2,260); Burlington, VT
January 31, 2026; 7:00 p.m., ESPN+		at Albany	W 68–65	13–8 (6–2)	Broadview Center (2,201); Albany, NY
February 5, 2026; 6:00 p.m., ESPN+		Binghamton	W 79–62	14–8 (7–2)	Chesapeake Employers Insurance Arena (1,039); Catonsville, MD
February 12, 2026; 6:00 p.m., ESPN+		at Maine	W 78–62	15–8 (8–2)	Memorial Gymnasium (1,061); Orono, ME
February 14, 2026; 1:00 p.m., ESPN+		at New Hampshire	W 85–63	16–8 (9–2)	Lundholm Gym (442); Durham, NH
February 19, 2026; 6:00 p.m., ESPN+		Vermont	W 75–62	17–8 (10–2)	Chesapeake Employers Insurance Arena (1,805); Catonsville, MD
February 21, 2026; 1:00 p.m., ESPN+		Albany	W 66–62	18–8 (11–2)	Chesapeake Employers Insurance Arena (1,274); Catonsville, MD
February 26, 2026; 6:00 p.m., ESPN+		Bryant	W 70–58	19–8 (12–2)	Chesapeake Employers Insurance Arena (1,692); Catonsville, MD
February 28, 2026; 1:00 p.m., ESPN+		at UMass Lowell	W 84–60	20–8 (13–2)	Kennedy Family Athletic Complex (925); Lowell, MA
March 3, 2026; 6:00 p.m., ESPN+		at NJIT	W 91–52	21–8 (14–2)	Wellness and Events Center (460); Newark, NJ
America East tournament
March 7, 2026; 1:00 p.m., ESPN+	(1)	(8) New Hampshire; Quarterfinal	W 84–69	22–8	Chesapeake Employers Insurance Arena (2,652); Catonsville, MD
March 10, 2026; 6:00 p.m., ESPN+	(1)	(4) UMass Lowell; Semifinal	W 91–69	23–8	Chesapeake Employers Insurance Arena (2,891); Catonsville, MD
March 14, 2026; 11:00 a.m., ESPN2	(1)	(2) Vermont; Championship	W 74–59	24–8	Chesapeake Employers Insurance Arena (4,753); Catonsville, MD
NCAA tournament
March 17, 2026; 6:40 p.m., truTV	(16 MW)	vs. (16 MW) Howard; First Four	L 83–86	24–9	UD Arena (11,756); Dayton, OH
*Non-conference game. ^{#}Rankings from AP poll. (#) Tournament seedings in parentheses. MW=Midwest. All times are in Eastern.
