= 2025–26 Albany Great Danes men's basketball team =

American college basketball season

2025–26 Albany Great Danes men's basketball
- Conference: America East Conference
- Record: 11–21 (7–9 America East)
- Head coach: Dwayne Killings (5th season)
- Assistant coaches: Jim Whitesell; Dan Madhavapallil; Willie Jenkins; Elijah Burns
- Home arena: Broadview Center

2025–26 America East Conference men's basketball standings
	Conf.				Overall
Team	W		L	PCT	W		L	PCT
UMBC	14	–	2	.875	21	–	8	.724
Vermont	12	–	4	.750	20	–	11	.645
NJIT	10	–	6	.625	15	–	16	.484
UMass Lowell	9	–	7	.563	14	–	17	.452
Albany	7	–	9	.438	11	–	20	.355
Maine	6	–	10	.375	8	–	23	.258
Bryant	5	–	11	.313	9	–	21	.300
New Hampshire	5	–	11	.313	9	–	20	.310
Binghamton	4	–	12	.250	8	–	23	.258
† 2026 AmEast tournament winner As of March 3, 2026

The 2025–26 Albany Great Danes men's basketball team represented the University at Albany, SUNY during the 2025–26 NCAA Division I men's basketball season. The Great Danes, led by fifth-year head coach Dwayne Killings, played their home games at the Broadview Center in Albany, New York as members of the America East Conference.

== Previous season ==
The Great Danes finished the 2024–25 season 17–16, 8–8 in America East play, to finish in fourth place. They defeated Binghamton in the quarterfinals of the America East tournament, before losing to Bryant in the semifinals.

== Preseason ==
On October 20, 2025, the America East Conference released their preseason polls. Albany was picked to finish second in the conference.

=== Preseason rankings ===
America East Preseason Poll
Place	Team	Votes
1	Vermont	63 (7)
T–2	Maine	47 (1)
T–2	Albany	47
4	UMass Lowell	39 (1)
5	Binghamton	37
6	Bryant	35
7	UMBC	31
8	NJIT	13
9	New Hampshire	12
(#) first-place votes

=== Preseason All-America East Team ===
Preseason All-America East Team
Player	Year	Position
Amir Lindsey	Sophomore	Guard

== Roster ==
2025–26 Albany Great Danes men's basketball team
Players
Coaches

Pos.	#	Name	Height	Weight	Year	Previous school	Hometown
F	00	Okechukwu Okeke	6 ft 10 in (2.08 m)	245 lb (111 kg)	RS Sr	FIU	East Chicago, IN
G	1	Will Richardson	6 ft 2 in (1.88 m)	175 lb (79 kg)	RS Jr	Fordham	Teaneck, NJ
G	2	Amir Lindsey	5 ft 11 in (1.8 m)	165 lb (75 kg)	So	Rivers School	Framingham, MA
G	3	Wilkin Paulino	6 ft 2 in (1.88 m)	185 lb (84 kg)	Fr	Proctor Academy	Worcester, MA
G	4	Miles Rose	6 ft 4 in (1.93 m)	205 lb (93 kg)	RS So	St. Bonaventure	Rochester, NY
F	5	Isaac Abidde	6 ft 9 in (2.06 m)	215 lb (98 kg)	RS Sr	Cleveland State	Albany, GA
F	7	Ife West-Ingram	6 ft 7 in (2.01 m)	200 lb (91 kg)	Jr	Rider	Philadelphia, PA
G	8	Nasir Muhammad	6 ft 1 in (1.85 m)	195 lb (88 kg)	Jr	Northern Illinois	Brooklyn, NY
C	10	Bautista Giralt	7 ft 0 in (2.13 m)	235 lb (107 kg)	RS So	Florida Day School	Buenos Aires, Argentina
G	11	Jaden Kempson	6 ft 3 in (1.91 m)	182 lb (83 kg)	Jr	Midland College	Bronx, NY
F	13	Ma'Kye Taylor	6 ft 7 in (2.01 m)	210 lb (95 kg)	So	Imhotep Institute HS	Philadelphia, PA
G	14	Zach Matulu	6 ft 5 in (1.96 m)	205 lb (93 kg)	RS So	Shaker HS	Albany, NY
G	22	Abdoulaye Fall	6 ft 7 in (2.01 m)	205 lb (93 kg)	Jr	Indian Hills CC	Dakar, Senegal
F	24	Tarique Foster	6 ft 8 in (2.03 m)	180 lb (82 kg)	Jr	UMass	Bronx, NY
C	25	Yaya Keita	6 ft 9 in (2.06 m)	230 lb (104 kg)	RS Jr	Oklahoma	Koutiala, Mali
F	33	Sultan Adewale	6 ft 8 in (2.03 m)	220 lb (100 kg)	RS So	Iona	East London, England

Head coach

- Dwayne Killings (Hampton)

Assistant coach(es)

- Jim Whitesell (Luther)
- Dan Madhavapallil (Marquette)
- Willie Jenkins (Tennessee Tech)
- Elijah Burns (Notre Dame)

Legend

- (C) Team captain
- (S) Suspended
- (I) Ineligible
- (W) Walk-on
- Injured
- Current redshirt

Roster
Last update: October 29, 2025

== Schedule and results ==
Date time, TV	Rank^{#}	Opponent^{#}	Result	Record	Site (attendance) city, state
Non-conference regular season
November 3, 2025*; 8:00 p.m., ESPN+		at Marquette	L 53–80	0–1	Fiserv Forum (13,168); Milwaukee, WI
November 8, 2025*; 6:00 p.m., ESPN+		at UMass	L 62–83	0–2	Mullins Center (3,025); Amherst, MA
November 11, 2025*; 6:30 p.m., ESPN+		SUNY Delhi	W 115–52	1–2	Broadview Center (2,223); Albany, NY
November 14, 2025*; 7:00 p.m., ESPN+		at Rhode Island	L 61–80	1–3	Ryan Center (3,331); Kingston, RI
November 18, 2025*; 6:30 p.m., ESPN+		Paul Smith's College	W 106–57	2–3	Broadview Center (1,588); Albany, NY
November 21, 2025*; 7:00 p.m., ESPN+		at Siena; Albany Cup	L 63–73	2–4	MVP Arena (7,024); Albany, NY
November 28, 2025*; 7:30 p.m.		vs. Colgate; Northern Classic	L 67–69	2–5	Place Bell (1,738); Laval, QC
November 29, 2025*; 7:30 p.m.		vs. Fordham; Northern Classic	L 68–88	2–6	Place Bell (1,867); Laval, QC
November 30, 2025*; 1:00 p.m.		vs. SUNY Oneonta; Northern Classic	W 90–62	3–6	Place Bell (1,767); Laval, QC
December 6, 2025*; 5:30 p.m., ESPN+		at Columbia	L 65–93	3–7	Levien Gymnasium (1,023); New York, NY
December 10, 2025*; 4:30 p.m., ESPNU		vs. Yale; Basketball Hall of Fame Classic	L 82−93	3−8	MassMutual Center (4,000); Springfield, MA
December 13, 2025*; 12:00 p.m., ESPN+		at Florida Atlantic	L 79–105	3–9	Eleanor R. Baldwin Arena (3,161); Boca Raton, FL
December 17, 2025*; 7:00 p.m., FloCollege		at Stony Brook	W 71–55	4–9	Stony Brook Arena (1,250); Stony Brook, NY
December 21, 2025*; 3:00 p.m., ESPN+		Cornell	L 75–83	4–10	Broadview Center (2,568); Albany, NY
December 30, 2025*; 6:00 p.m., SECN		at South Carolina	L 67–96	4–11	Colonial Life Arena (9,501); Columbia, SC
America East regular season
January 3, 2026; 2:00 p.m., ESPN+		at UMass Lowell	L 71–83	4–12 (0–1)	Kennedy Family Athletic Complex (636); Lowell, MA
January 10, 2026; 2:00 p.m., ESPN+		Bryant	W 71–46	5–12 (1–1)	Broadview Center (1,510); Albany, NY
January 15, 2026; 6:30 p.m., ESPN+		Binghamton	W 69–53	6–12 (2–1)	Broadview Center (1,120); Albany, NY
January 19, 2026; 1:00 p.m., ESPNU		Vermont	W 75–68	7–12 (3–1)	Broadview Center (3,008); Albany, NY
January 22, 2026; 6:00 p.m., ESPN+		at Maine	L 49–52	7–13 (3–2)	Memorial Gymnasium (1,065); Orono, ME
January 24, 2026; 2:00 p.m., ESPN+		at New Hampshire	L 72–80	7–14 (3–3)	Lundholm Gym (574); Durham, NH
January 29, 2026; 6:30 p.m., ESPN+		NJIT	L 68–77	7–15 (3–4)	Broadview Center (2,006); Albany, NY
January 31, 2026; 7:00 p.m., ESPN+		UMBC	L 65–68	7–16 (3–5)	Broadview Center (2,201); Albany, NY
February 5, 2026; 6:00 p.m., ESPN+		at Bryant	W 65–63	8–16 (4–5)	Chace Athletic Center (200); Smithfield, RI
February 7, 2026; 7:00 p.m., ESPN+		UMass Lowell	L 79–89	8–17 (4–6)	Broadview Center (2,009); Albany, NY
February 14, 2026; 4:00 p.m., ESPN+		at Binghamton	W 77–74	9–17 (5–6)	Dr. Bai Lee Court (1,839); Vestal, NY
February 19, 2026; 7:00 p.m., ESPN+		at NJIT	W 81–63	10–17 (6–6)	Wellness and Events Center (507); Newark, NJ
February 21, 2026; 1:00 p.m., ESPN+		at UMBC	L 62–66	10–18 (6–7)	Chesapeake Employers Insurance Arena (1,274); Catonsville, MD
February 26, 2026; 6:30 p.m., ESPN+		Maine	L 59–70	10–19 (6–8)	Broadview Center (1,622); Albany, NY
February 28, 2026; 2:00 p.m., ESPN+		New Hampshire	W 84–61	11–19 (7–8)	Broadview Center (2,034); Albany, NY
March 3, 2026; 7:00 p.m., ESPN+		at Vermont	L 56–69	11–20 (7–9)	Patrick Gym (2,309); Burlington, VT
America East tournament
March 7, 2026; 1:00 p.m., ESPN+	(5)	at (4) UMass Lowell; Quarterfinals	L 76–81	11–21	Kennedy Family Athletic Complex (677); Lowell, MA
*Non-conference game. ^{#}Rankings from AP poll. (#) Tournament seedings in parentheses. All times are in Eastern.
