= 2025–26 UMass Lowell River Hawks men's basketball team =

American college basketball season

2025–26 UMass Lowell River Hawks men's basketball
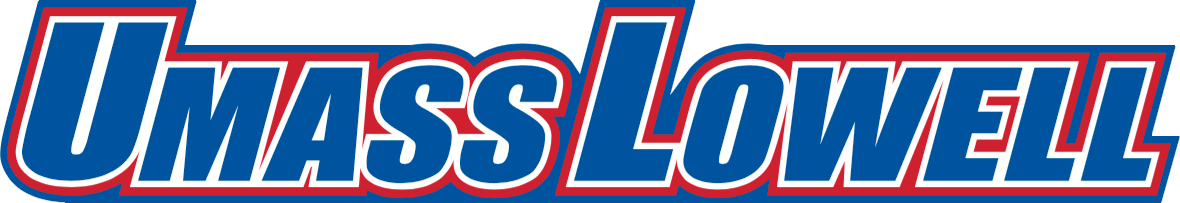
- Conference: America East Conference
- Record: 15–18 (9–7 America East)
- Head coach: Pat Duquette (13th season)
- Assistant coaches: Matt Graves; Bryan Dougher; David Johnson; Octavius Hinnant
- Home arena: Kennedy Family Athletic Complex

2025–26 America East Conference men's basketball standings
	Conf.				Overall
Team	W		L	PCT	W		L	PCT
UMBC †	14	–	2	.875	24	–	9	.727
Vermont	12	–	4	.750	22	–	12	.647
NJIT	10	–	6	.625	16	–	17	.485
UMass Lowell	9	–	7	.563	15	–	18	.455
Albany	7	–	9	.438	11	–	21	.344
Maine	6	–	10	.375	8	–	24	.250
Bryant	5	–	11	.313	9	–	22	.290
New Hampshire	5	–	11	.313	9	–	21	.300
Binghamton	4	–	12	.250	8	–	23	.258
† 2026 AmEast tournament winner

The 2025–26 UMass Lowell River Hawks men's basketball team represented the University of Massachusetts Lowell during the 2025–26 NCAA Division I men's basketball season. The River Hawks, led by thirteenth-year head coach Pat Duquette, played their home games at the Kennedy Family Athletic Complex in Lowell, Massachusetts as members of the America East Conference.

== Previous season ==
The River Hawks finished the 2024–25 season 17–15, 6–10 in America East play, to finish in a tie for sixth place. They were defeated by Maine in the quarterfinals of the America East tournament.

== Preseason ==
On October 20, 2025, the America East Conference released their preseason polls. UMass Lowell was picked to finish fourth in the conference, while receiving a first-place vote.

=== Preseason rankings ===
America East Preseason Poll
Place	Team	Votes
1	Vermont	63 (7)
T–2	Maine	47 (1)
T–2	Albany	47
4	UMass Lowell	39 (1)
5	Binghamton	37
6	Bryant	35
7	UMBC	31
8	NJIT	13
9	New Hampshire	12
(#) first-place votes

=== Preseason All-America East Team ===
No players were named to the All-America East team.

== Roster ==
2025–26 UMass Lowell River Hawks men's basketball team
Players
Coaches

Pos.	#	Name	Height	Weight	Year	Previous school	Hometown
G	1	Kris Johnson	6 ft 5 in (1.96 m)	190 lb (86 kg)	RS Fr	Clinton Grace Christian School	Prince George's County, MD
F	2	Keenan Bey	6 ft 7 in (2.01 m)	205 lb (93 kg)	RS Fr	Bishop Gorman HS	Las Vegas, NV
G	3	Darrel Yepdo	6 ft 0 in (1.83 m)	185 lb (84 kg)	Jr	Saint Michael's	Dracut, MA
G	6	Isaiah Walter	6 ft 7 in (2.01 m)	200 lb (91 kg)	RS Fr	Tuggerah Lakes Secondary	Central Coast, Australia
G	9	Angel Montas Jr.	6 ft 6 in (1.98 m)	225 lb (102 kg)	Jr	Mercer	La Romana, Dominican Republic
F	10	Austin Green	6 ft 8 in (2.03 m)	210 lb (95 kg)	Sr	Texas State	Sicklerville, NJ
G	11	Xavier Spencer	6 ft 1 in (1.85 m)	210 lb (95 kg)	Jr	Carleton	Calgary, AB
F	13	Shawn Simmons II	6 ft 6 in (1.98 m)	215 lb (98 kg)	Jr	Saint Joseph's	Philadelphia, PA
G	14	Jared Frey	6 ft 6 in (1.98 m)	196 lb (89 kg)	Jr	Stony Brook	Columbus, OH
F	15	Jerrell Roberson II	6 ft 9 in (2.06 m)	225 lb (102 kg)	Jr	James Madison	Upper Marlboro, MD
G	22	Khalil Farmer	6 ft 3 in (1.91 m)	190 lb (86 kg)	Jr	Hofstra	Philadelphia, PA
F	23	Victor Okojie	6 ft 8 in (2.03 m)	215 lb (98 kg)	Fr	Hamilton Heights Christian Academy	Castlebar, Ireland
G	55	JJ Massaquoi	6 ft 6 in (1.98 m)	235 lb (107 kg)	Fr	Jackson-Reed HS	Prince George's County, MD

Head coach

- Pat Duquette (Williams)

Assistant coach(es)

- Matt Graves (Belmont Abbey)
- Bryan Dougher (Stony Brook)
- David Johnson (Lyndon State)
- Octavius Hinnant (Glenville State)

Legend

- (C) Team captain
- (S) Suspended
- (I) Ineligible
- (W) Walk-on
- Injured
- Current redshirt

Roster
Last update: November 6, 2025

== Schedule and results ==
Date time, TV	Rank^{#}	Opponent^{#}	Result	Record	Site (attendance) city, state
Non-conference regular season
November 3, 2025*; 7:00 p.m., ESPN+		Rivier	W 107–55	1–0	Kennedy Family Athletic Complex (795); Lowell, MA
November 7, 2025*; 7:30 p.m., Peacock		at No. 4 UConn; UConn MTE	L 47–110	1–1	PeoplesBank Arena (15,495); Hartford, CT
November 10, 2025*; 6:00 p.m., ESPN+		New Haven; UConn MTE	L 67–73	1–2	Kennedy Family Athletic Complex (614); Lowell, MA
November 13, 2025*; 7:00 p.m., ESPN+		at Columbia; UConn MTE	L 72–86	1–3	Levien Gymnasium (704); New York, NY
November 16, 2025*; 2:00 p.m., ACCNX		at Wake Forest	L 75–109	1–4	LJVM Coliseum (6,825); Winston-Salem, NC
November 19, 2025*; 8:00 p.m., ESPN+		at Bradley	L 77–87	1–5	Carver Arena (4,932); Peoria, IL
November 22, 2025*; 2:00 p.m., ESPN+		at Saint Peter's	L 66–68	1–6	Run Baby Run Arena (553); Jersey City, NJ
November 26, 2025*; 12:00 pm, NECFR		at Stonehill	W 75–64	2–6	Merkert Gymnasium (171); Easton, MA
November 29, 2025*; 1:00 p.m., ESPN+		Emerson	W 90–67	3–6	Kennedy Family Athletic Complex (201); Lowell, MA
December 6, 2025*; 4:00 p.m., ESPN+		at UMass	L 60–80	3–7	Mullins Center (2,442); Amherst, MA
December 10, 2025*; 6:00 p.m., ESPN+		Fisher	W 122−73	4−7	Kennedy Family Athletic Complex (355); Lowell, MA
December 13, 2025*; 2:00 p.m., ESPN+		at Quinnipiac	L 71–75	4–8	M&T Bank Arena (766); Hamden, CT
December 16, 2025*; 6:00 p.m., ESPN+		Sacred Heart	W 87–82	5–8	Kennedy Family Athletic Complex (315); Lowell, MA
December 21, 2025*; 12:00 p.m., ESPN+		at Boston University	L 76–88	5–9	Case Gym (810); Boston, MA
December 29, 2025*; 5:00 p.m., BTN		at No. 25 Iowa	L 62–90	5–10	Carver–Hawkeye Arena (11,324); Iowa City, IA
America East regular season
January 3, 2026; 2:00 p.m., ESPN+		Albany	W 83–71	6–10 (1–0)	Kennedy Family Athletic Complex (636); Lowell, MA
January 8, 2026; 6:00 p.m., ESPN+		at Bryant	W 77–63	7–10 (2–0)	Chace Athletic Center (274); Smithfield, RI
January 10, 2026; 2:00 p.m., ESPN+		at Binghamton	W 73–68	8–10 (3–0)	Dr. Bai Lee Court (1,651); Vestal, NY
January 15, 2026; 6:00 p.m., ESPN+		NJIT	L 64–73	8–11 (3–1)	Kennedy Family Athletic Complex (472); Lowell, MA
January 22, 2026; 6:00 p.m., ESPN+		Vermont	L 68–77	8–12 (3–2)	Kennedy Family Athletic Complex (714); Lowell, MA
January 24, 2026; 1:00 p.m., ESPN+		at UMBC	L 56–79	8–13 (3–3)	Chesapeake Employers Insurance Arena (1,012); Catonsville, MD
January 29, 2026; 6:00 p.m., ESPN+		at New Hampshire	L 61–66	8–14 (3–4)	Lundholm Gym (505); Durham, NH
January 31, 2026; 2:00 p.m., ESPN+		Maine	W 91–77	9–14 (4–4)	Kennedy Family Athletic Complex (957); Lowell, MA
February 5, 2026; 7:00 p.m., ESPN+		at NJIT	L 56–81	9–15 (4–5)	Wellness and Events Center (181); Newark, NJ
February 7, 2026; 7:00 p.m., ESPN+		at Albany	W 89–79	10–15 (5–5)	Broadview Center (2,009); Albany, NY
February 12, 2026; 6:00 p.m., ESPN+		Bryant	W 88–69	11–15 (6–5)	Kennedy Family Athletic Complex (549); Lowell, MA
February 19, 2026; 6:00 p.m., ESPN+		New Hampshire	W 78–56	12–15 (7–5)	Kennedy Family Athletic Complex (787); Lowell, MA
February 21, 2026; 1:00 p.m., ESPN+		Binghamton	W 92–79	13–15 (8–5)	Kennedy Family Athletic Complex (957); Lowell, MA
February 26, 2026; 7:00 p.m., ESPN+		at Vermont	L 64–66	13–16 (8–6)	Patrick Gym (2,496); Burlington, VT
February 28, 2026; 1:00 p.m., ESPN+		UMBC	L 60–84	13–17 (8–7)	Kennedy Family Athletic Complex (925); Lowell, MA
March 3, 2026; 6:00 p.m., ESPN+		at Maine	W 67–56	14–17 (9–7)	Memorial Gymnasium (1,148); Orono, ME
America East tournament
March 7, 2026; 1:00 p.m., ESPN+	(4)	(5) Albany; Quarterfinals	W 81–76	15–17	Kennedy Family Athletic Complex (677); Lowell, MA
March 10, 2026; 6:00 p.m., ESPN+	(4)	at (1) UMBC; Semifinals	L 69–91	15–18	Chesapeake Employers Insurance Arena (2,891); Catonsville, MD
*Non-conference game. ^{#}Rankings from AP poll. (#) Tournament seedings in parentheses. All times are in Eastern.
