= Chris Markwood =

American basketball coach

Current position
- Title: Head coach
- Team: Maine
- Conference: America East
- Record: 58–77 (.430)

Biographical details
- Born: December 22, 1981 (age 44); South Portland, Maine, U.S.

Playing career
- 2000–2003: Notre Dame
- 2003–2005: Maine

Coaching career (HC unless noted)
- 2006–2011: Maine (assistant)
- 2011–2014: Vermont (assistant)
- 2014–2021: Northeastern (assistant)
- 2021–2022: Boston College (assistant)
- 2022–present: Maine

Head coaching record
- Overall: 58–77 (.430)

Chris Markwood (born December 22, 1981) is an American basketball coach who is the current head coach of the Maine Black Bears men's basketball team.

== Playing career ==
Markwood played high school basketball at South Portland High School where he was named Maine's Gatorade Player of the Year in 2000. He began his college career at Notre Dame for two seasons before transferring to Maine for his final two seasons, where he was a team captain.

== Coaching career ==
After graduation, Markwood started his coaching career at his alma mater, assisting the Black Bears under Ted Woodward for six seasons before joining the staff at Vermont where he was part of the Catamounts' 2012 NCAA tournament appearance. He'd then move on to Northeastern from 2014 to 2021, where he was part of two NCAA appearances in 2015 and 2019 as well as a CAA regular season and tournament title in 2015. In 2021, Markwood would join Earl Grant's staff at Boston College for a single season before being named the head coach at Maine on March 21, 2022, replacing Richard Barron.

== Personal life ==
Markwood is married to the former Ashley Underwood, an all-conference selection at Maine for its women's basketball team. She was also the 2009 Miss Maine USA and a contestant on Survivor: Redemption Island.

== Head coaching record ==
Record table
Season	Team	Overall	Conference	Standing	Postseason
Maine Black Bears (America East) (2022–present)
2022–23	Maine	13–17	7–9	7th	
2023–24	Maine	15–17	7–9	T–4th	
2024–25	Maine	20–14	10–6	3rd	
2025–26	Maine	8–24	6–10	6th	
2026–27	Maine	2–5	0–0		
Maine:		58–77 (.430)	30–34 (.469)		
Total:		58–77 (.430)			
National champion Postseason invitational champion Conference regular season champion Conference regular season and conference tournament champion Division regular season champion Division regular season and conference tournament champion Conference tournament champion
