= Pat Duquette =

American basketball player and coach

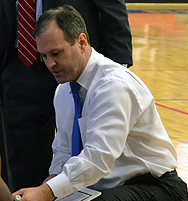
- Duquette in 2014

Current position
- Title: Head coach
- Team: UMass Lowell
- Conference: America East
- Record: 194–208 (.483)

Biographical details
- Born: November 4, 1970 (age 56); Dalton, Massachusetts, U.S.

Playing career
- 1990–1993: Williams

Coaching career (HC unless noted)
- 1993–1994: Centenary (NJ) (assistant)
- 1994–1995: St. Lawrence (assistant)
- 1995–1997: St. Michael's (assistant)
- 1997–2010: Boston College (assistant)
- 2010–2013: Northeastern (assistant)
- 2013–present: UMass Lowell

Head coaching record
- Overall: 194–208 (.483)

Accomplishments and honors

Awards
- America East Coach of the Year (2023)

Pat Duquette (born November 4, 1970) is the head men's basketball coach at UMass Lowell. He is the first coach in the school's Division I history, as the River Hawks joined the America East Conference for the 2013–14 season.

== Biography ==
=== Coaching career ===
After graduation from Williams College in 1993, where he captained the men's basketball team, Duquette interned with the New Jersey Nets while simultaneously coaching at Centenary College of New Jersey. He then moved on St. Lawrence University in 1994–95 for a one-year stint as an assistant before landing at Saint Michael's College for two seasons, where he helped guide the Purple Knights to a Northeast-10 Conference title and appearance in the NCAA Tournament.

Duquette joined Al Skinner's staff at Boston College, where he stayed for 13 seasons, starting in an administrative role, moving all the way up to the role of associate head coach in his final season. He was a part of Eagles squads that went to six NCAA Tournaments, and the 2004–05 Big East Conference regular season championship. In 2010–11, he moved across Boston to Northeastern as associate head coach, reuniting him with former BC assistant Bill Coen.

On May 16, 2013, Duquette was named the eighth coach in UMass Lowell history, replacing Greg Herenda.

=== Personal life ===
Duquette is the younger brother of Jim Duquette, the former general manager of the New York Mets and Baltimore Orioles. His cousin, Dan Duquette, is the former general manager of the Boston Red Sox, Montreal Expos, and Baltimore Orioles.

== Head coaching record ==
=== College ===
Record table
Season	Team	Overall	Conference	Standing	Postseason
UMass Lowell (America East Conference) (2013–present)
2013–14	UMass Lowell	10–18	8–8	5th	
2014–15	UMass Lowell	12–17	6–10	6th	
2015–16	UMass Lowell	11–18	7–9	5th	
2016–17	UMass Lowell	11–20	5–11	6th	
2017–18	UMass Lowell	12–18	6–10	T–6th	
2018–19	UMass Lowell	15–17	7–9	5th	
2019–20	UMass Lowell	13–19	7–9	T–6th	
2020–21	UMass Lowell	11–12	7–8	6th	
2021–22	UMass Lowell	15–16	7–11	8th	
2022–23	UMass Lowell	26–8	11–5	2nd	
2023–24	UMass Lowell	22–10	11–5	T–2nd	
2024–25	UMass Lowell	17–15	6–10	T–6th	
2025–26	UMass Lowell	15–18	9–7	4th	
2026–27	UMass Lowell	4–2	0–0		
UMass Lowell:		194–208 (.483)	97–112 (.464)		
Total:		194–208 (.483)			
National champion Postseason invitational champion Conference regular season champion Conference regular season and conference tournament champion Division regular season champion Division regular season and conference tournament champion Conference tournament champion
