= Jim Ferry =

American basketball coach (born 1967)

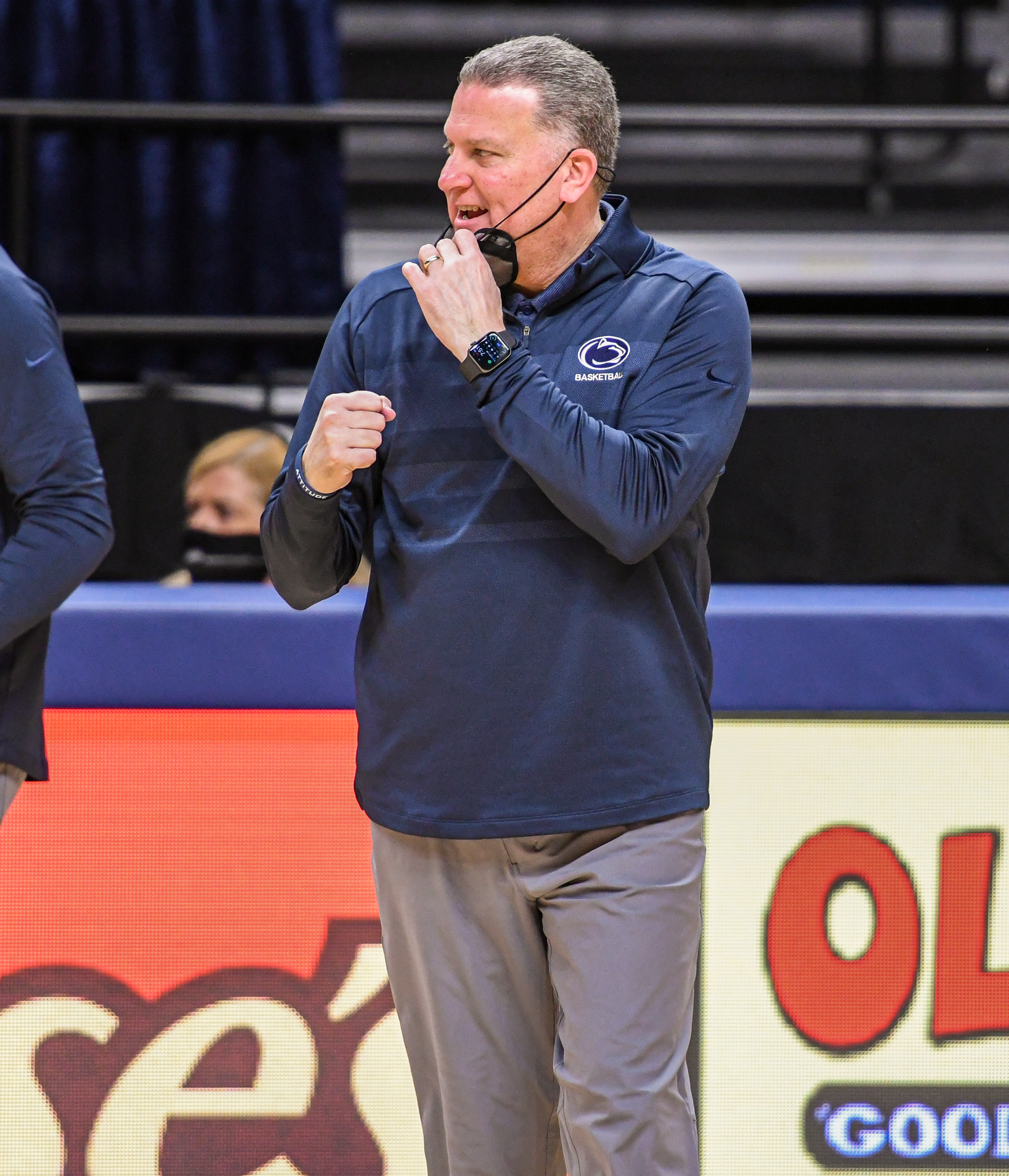
- Ferry coaching Penn State in 2021

Current position
- Title: Head coach
- Team: UMBC
- Conference: America East
- Record: 88–81 (.521)

Biographical details
- Born: July 9, 1967 (age 59); Elmont, New York, U.S.

Playing career
- 1985–1986: NYIT
- 1987–1990: Keene State

Coaching career (HC unless noted)
- 1990–1991: Keene State (assistant)
- 1991–1998: Bentley (assistant)
- 1998–1999: Plymouth State
- 1999–2002: Adelphi
- 2002–2012: Long Island
- 2012–2017: Duquesne
- 2017–2020: Penn State (assistant)
- 2020–2021: Penn State (interim HC)
- 2021–present: UMBC

Head coaching record
- Overall: 413–360 (.534)
- Tournaments: 0–3 (NCAA Division I); 1–1 (CBI); 5–3 (NCAA Division II); 0–1 (TBC)

Accomplishments and honors

Championships
- LEC regular season (1999); 3 ECC regular season (2000–2002); ECC tournament (2001); 2 NEC regular season (2011, 2012); 2 NEC tournament (2011, 2012); America East regular season (2026); America East tournament (2026)

Awards
- 2× NEC Coach of the Year (2005, 2011); America East Coach of the Year (2026)

James A. Ferry Jr. (born July 9, 1967) is an American college basketball coach who is the current head coach of the UMBC Retrievers men's basketball team. He formerly served as interim head coach for the 2020–2021 season at Penn State and the head men's basketball coach at Duquesne, Long Island, Adelphi, and Plymouth State.

== Playing career ==
Ferry played one season at NYIT before transferring to Keene State College for his final three years where he led the Owls in scoring his junior year.

== Coaching career ==
After graduation, Ferry stayed on as an assistant coach with his alma mater for one season before joining Bentley as an assistant coach from 1991 to 1998. He'd accept his first head coaching job, a single season at Division III Plymouth State, guiding the Panthers to the 1999 Little East Conference regular season title. Ferry moved on to Division II Adelphi, where he stayed for three seasons, making three consecutive NCAA tournament appearances, including two Elite Eights. He also guided the Panthers to 30-straight wins during the 2000–01 season. In 2002, Ferry would be named the head coach at LIU Brooklyn, where he'd stay for 10 seasons, earning a pair of Northeast Conference regular season and tournament titles plus back-to-back NCAA tournament appearances in 2011 and 2012.

Ferry would accept the head coaching position at Duquesne in 2012 where he'd coach for five seasons before being fired with a 60–97 overall record. Ferry would subsequently join Pat Chambers' staff at Penn State in 2017 and was part of the program's 2018 NIT Championship squad. Following the resignation of Chambers on October 21, 2020, Ferry was named interim head coach at Penn State for the remainder of the season, putting together an 11–14 record. Ferry would not be retained by Penn State, which chose to hire Micah Shrewsberry as its permanent head coach.

On April 12, 2021, Ferry was named the head coach at UMBC, replacing Ryan Odom who departed for the head coaching position at Utah State.

== Head coaching record ==
Record table
Season	Team	Overall	Conference	Standing	Postseason
Plymouth State Panthers (Little East Conference) (1998–1999)
1998–99	Plymouth State	22–8	11–3	T–1st	ECAC Runner-up
Plymouth State:		22–8 (.733)	11–3 (.786)		
Adelphi Panthers (East Coast Conference) (1999–2002)
1999–00	Adelphi	23–7			NCAA Division II Regional Final
2000–01	Adelphi	31–1			NCAA Division II Quarterfinal
2001–02	Adelphi	28–3			NCAA Division II Quarterfinal
Adelphi:		82–11 (.882)			
Long Island Blackbirds (Northeast Conference) (2002–2012)
2002–03	Long Island	9–19	7–11	T–8th	
2003–04	Long Island	8–19	4–14	11th	
2004–05	Long Island	14–15	10–8	4th	
2005–06	Long Island	12–16	9–9	6th	
2006–07	Long Island	10–19	6–12	10th	
2007–08	Long Island	15–15	7–11	7th	
2008–09	Long Island	16–14	12–6	T–2nd	
2009–10	Long Island	14–17	11–7	4th	
2010–11	Long Island	27–6	16–2	1st	NCAA Division I Round of 64
2011–12	Long Island	25–9	16–2	1st	NCAA Division I Round of 64
Long Island:		150–149 (.502)	98–82 (.544)		
Duquesne Dukes (Atlantic 10 Conference) (2012–2017)
2012–13	Duquesne	8–22	1–15	16th	
2013–14	Duquesne	13–17	5–11	T–10th	
2014–15	Duquesne	12–19	6–12	11th	
2015–16	Duquesne	17–17	6–12	T–10th	CBI Quarterfinal
2016–17	Duquesne	10–22	3–15	14th	
Duquesne:		60–97 (.382)	21–65 (.244)		
Penn State Nittany Lions (Big Ten Conference) (2020–2021)
2020–21	Penn State	11–14	7–12	T–10th	
Penn State:		11–14 (.440)	7–12 (.368)		
UMBC Retrievers (America East Conference) (2021–present)
2021–22	UMBC	18–14	11–7	2nd	TBC First Round
2022–23	UMBC	18–14	8–8	T–4th	
2023–24	UMBC	11–21	6–10	7th	
2024–25	UMBC	13–19	5–11	8th	
2025–26	UMBC	24–9	14–2	1st	NCAA Division I First Four
2026–27	UMBC	4–4	0–0		
UMBC:		88–81 (.521)	44–38 (.537)		
Total:		413–360 (.534)			
National champion Postseason invitational champion Conference regular season champion Conference regular season and conference tournament champion Division regular season champion Division regular season and conference tournament champion Conference tournament champion
