= TJ Hurley =

Canadian basketball player (born 2004)

No. 9 – Leicester Riders
- Position: Shooting guard
- League: SLB

Personal information
- Born: May 26, 2004 (age 22)
- Listed height: 6 ft 5 in (1.96 m)
- Listed weight: 190 lb (86 kg)

Career information
- High school: E. L. Crossley Secondary School (Fonthill, Ontario); The Rock School (Gainesville, Florida)
- College: Vermont (2022–2026)
- NBA draft: 2026: undrafted
- Playing career: 2026–present

Career history
- 2026–present: Leicester Riders

Career highlights
- America East Player of the Year (2026); 2× First-team All-America East (2025, 2026); America East All-Defensive Team (2026)

Thomas "TJ" Hurley (born May 26, 2004) is a Canadian basketball player for the Leicester Riders of the British Super League Basketball (SLB). He played college basketball for the Vermont Catamounts.

== High school career ==
Hurley grew up in Ontario and attended E. L. Crossley Secondary School. He played his senior season at The Rock School under coach Justin Harden. He lived with a host family and averaged 15 points per game. Hurley committed to play college basketball at Vermont after considering offers from UNC Wilmington, Fairfield, Florida Gulf Coast and NJIT.

== College career ==
As a freshman, Hurley averaged 5.1 points and 1.7 rebounds per game and a 41.2 three-point percentage, earning America East All-Rookie Team honors. He averaged 7.4 points and 2.7 rebounds per game as a sophomore. Hurley averaged 15.8 points, 2.4 rebounds, and 1.3 assists per game as a junior. He was named to the First Team All-America East. As a senior, Hurley was twice named America East player of the week and received America East Player of the Year honors. He averaged 15 points and 3.5 rebounds per game.

== Professional career ==
Following the close of his college career, Hurley signed with the Leicester Riders of the British Super League Basketball (SLB) for the 2026–27 season.

== National team career ==
Hurley participated in the 2023 FIBA U-19 World Cup in Debrecen, Hungary, representing the Canada men's national under-19 basketball team. He came off the bench and helped the team to a seventh-place finish.
