= Kennedy Family Athletic Complex =

Multi-purpose arena in Lowell, Massachusetts

- Kennedy Family Athletic Complex
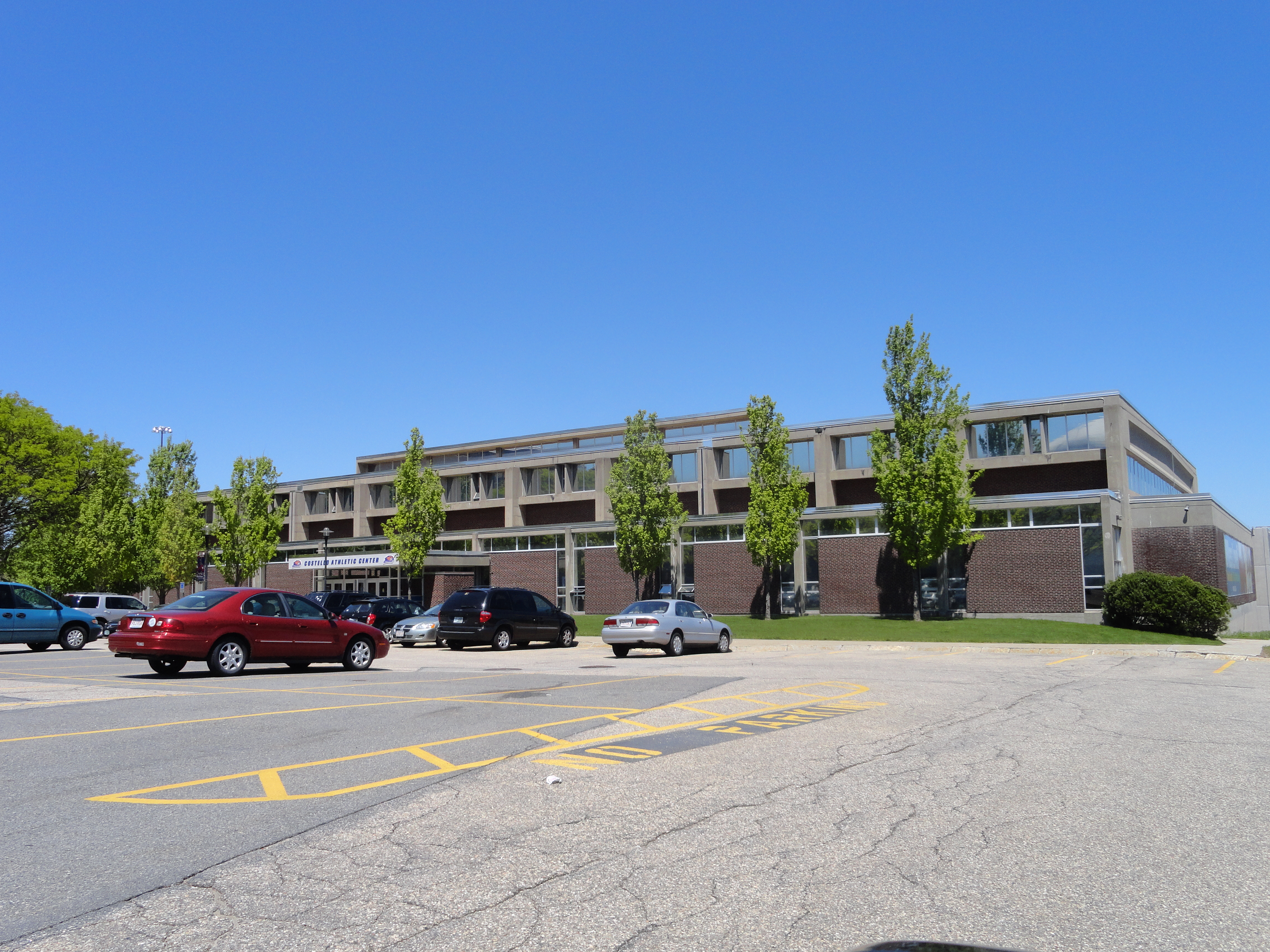
- Interactive map of Kennedy Family Athletic Complex
- Full name: Kennedy Family Athletic Complex
- Former names: Costello Athletic Center (1964–2025)
- Location: Lowell, Massachusetts
- Coordinates: 42.6555°N 71.3242°W
- Owner: University of Massachusetts Lowell
- Operator: University of Massachusetts Lowell
- Capacity: 2,000

Construction
- Opened: 1964

Tenant
- University of Massachusetts Lowell basketball

The Kennedy Family Athletic Complex, formerly known as the Costello Athletic Center, is a 2,000-seat multi-purpose arena located at 261 Riverside St. Lowell, Massachusetts. It is home to the University of Massachusetts Lowell River Hawks men's and women's basketball teams. On either side of the gymnasium there are bleachers overlooking the court for spectators to watch. In 2020, the building was renovated by Beacon Architectural Associates. The renovations include a new team room, expansion of the training room, and renovations to the locker room and bathrooms. The total cost was $3,048,000 and construction lasted for six months. On October 16, 2025, the arena was renamed as the Kennedy Family Athletic Complex.

== See also ==
- List of NCAA Division I basketball arenas
