= Greensboro Day School =

Prep school in Greensboro, North Carolina, US

Location
- 5401 Lawndale Drive; Guilford County; Greensboro, North Carolina 27455; United States; 36°09′04″N 79°50′11″W

Information
- Type: Private; Independent; day; college-preparatory school
- Motto: Friendship; Scholarship; Sportsmanship
- Religious affiliation: Nonsectarian
- Established: 1970 (56 years ago)
- CEEB code: 341597
- Head of school: Dr. Tracie Catlett
- Grades: ages 2 to grade 12
- Gender: Co-educational
- Enrollment: 1020
- Student to teacher ratio: 16:1
- Campus size: 80 acres
- Campus type: Suburban
- Colors: Green and Gold
- Athletics: North Carolina Independent Schools Athletic Association (NCISAA)
- Athletics conference: Piedmont Triad Athletic Conference (PTAC)
- Mascot: Prowler the Bengal
- Nickname: Bengals
- Rival: Wesleyan Christian Academy, High Point Christian Academy, Forsyth Country Day School
- Accreditation: SACS; SAIS; NAIS
- Tuition: PreK-12: $15,310–$29,680
- Website: www.greensboroday.org

Greensboro Day School is a private, day, college preparatory school located in Greensboro, North Carolina, United States. It enrolls students from age 2 through grade 12.

== History ==
The school was established in 1970. When Greensboro Day first opened its doors, the school had an enrollment of 95 students and used space at the Temple Emanuel synagogue. It moved to its permanent location on Lawndale Drive three months after opening.

Greensboro Day's 50th anniversary was on September 14, 2020.

As of 2026, Greensboro Day School had an enrollment of 1,020 students, making it one of the largest nonsectarian independent schools in the Piedmont Triad of North Carolina.

== Academics ==
AP (Advanced Placement) classes offered in the Upper School include:

Art, Biology, Calculus AB, Calculus BC, Chemistry, English Language, English Literature, French Language, Latin, Macroeconomics and Microeconomics, Physics C (Mechanics), Psychology, Spanish Language, Spanish Literature, Statistics, US Government and Politics, US History, World History

The school enrolls students from age 2 to grade 12 and is fully accredited by the Southern Association of Colleges and Schools and by the Southern Association of Independent Schools.

== Athletics ==
Greensboro Day competes in the 3A division of the North Carolina Independent Schools Athletic Association (NCISAA).

The Bengals compete in Baseball, Basketball, Cheerleading, Cross Country, Field Hockey, Golf, Lacrosse, Soccer, Swimming, Tennis, Track, Volleyball, and Wrestling.

Coached by Freddy Johnson, the Boys Basketball Team has won 11 NCISAA 4A State Championships (1989, 1990, 1995, 1996, 2000, 2002, 2006, 2015, 2017, 2018, 2019), and 1 NCISAA 3A State Championship (2023). They made their first appearance in the DICK'S Nationals in 2015, and advanced to the second round in 2017 after a win over #2 ranked IMG Academy. On November 24, 2017, Coach Johnson won his 1,000th game, defeating Charlotte Vance, 59-28. He became 1 of only 20 high school coaches to achieve this feat.

The Boys Soccer Team has won four State Championships in 1988, 2000, 2009, and 2010.

The Girls Soccer Team has won twelve State Championships (1991, 1995, 1996, 1997, 1998, 1999, 2000, 2002, 2003, 2004, 2005, 2007). Under coach Kim Burroughs, the team reached a national #1 ranking during the 1998 season.

== Notable alumni ==
- Kara Medoff Barnett — executive director of American Ballet Theatre
- Michael Blomquist — former World Champion rower (graduated from Phillips Exeter Academy)
- Jonathan Campbell — professional MLS player
- Spencer Chamberlain — musician & vocalist of Underoath
- Ace Flagg — basketball player
- Justin Gainey — basketball coach, player
- Kelly Link — author, editor, 2018 MacArthur Fellow, and 2016 finalist for the Pulitzer Prize for Fiction
- John Newman III — professional basketball player
- Luke Payne — professional basketball player
- Wayne Robinson — professional basketball player
- Norman "Ned" Sharpless — director of the National Cancer Institute and acting FDA commissioner
- Meg Steedle — actress
- Peter Stroud — guitarist and cofounder of 65amps, a company manufacturing guitar amplifiers
