= Ace Flagg =

American basketball player (born 2006)

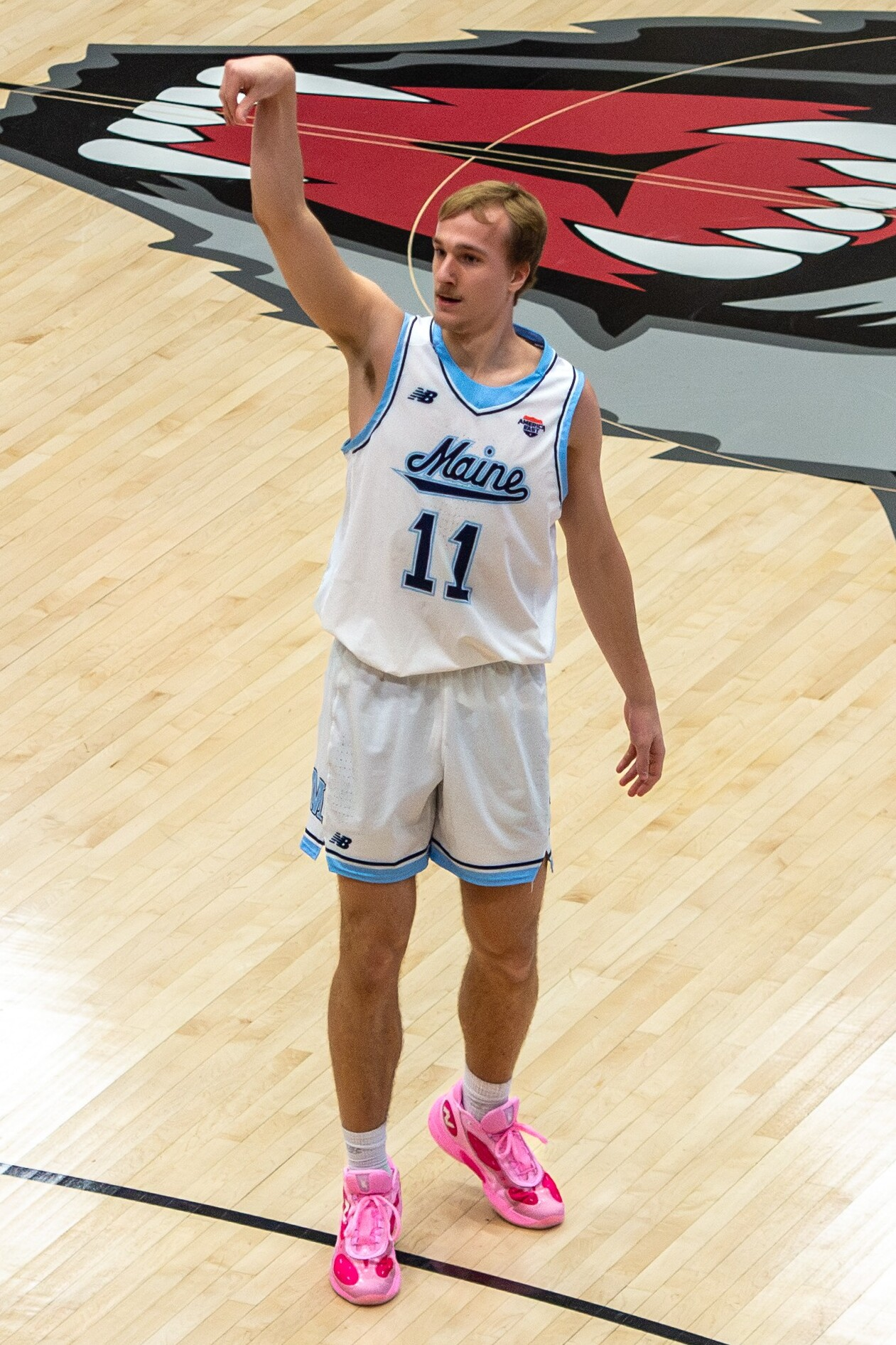

No. 11 – Maine Black Bears
- Position: Power forward / small forward
- League: America East Conference

Personal information
- Born: December 21, 2006 (age 19) Newport, Maine, U.S.
- Listed height: 6 ft 7 in (2.01 m)
- Listed weight: 205 lb (93 kg)

Career information
- High school: Nokomis (Newport, Maine); Montverde Academy (Montverde, Florida); Greensboro Day School (Greensboro, North Carolina)
- College: Maine (2025–present)

Career highlights
- America East All-Rookie Team (2026)

Ace Flagg (born December 21, 2006) is an American college basketball player for the Maine Black Bears. The 6-foot-7 forward is the twin brother of NBA first overall pick Cooper Flagg.

== Early life and family ==
Flagg was born in Newport, Maine, to Kelly (née Bowman) and Ralph Flagg. His mother was a standout basketball player at Nokomis Regional High School and later played for the University of Maine. She was tri-captain of the 1998–99 Maine team that achieved the program's only NCAA tournament victory, defeating Stanford 60–58. His father, Ralph, played college basketball at Eastern Maine Community College.

Flagg is the fraternal twin brother of Cooper Flagg, who played at Duke University and was selected first overall in the 2025 NBA draft by the Dallas Mavericks. The twins also have an older brother, Hunter, who attended the University of Maine.

== High school career ==
Flagg began his high school career at Nokomis Regional High School in his hometown of Newport, Maine. As a freshman in 2021–22, he played alongside his twin brother Cooper and helped lead the Warriors to their first-ever Maine Class A state championship.

Following their freshman season, the Flagg twins transferred to Montverde Academy in Montverde, Florida. During his sophomore year (2022–23), Flagg played limited minutes as the team featured numerous high-profile recruits. As a junior in 2023–24, he appeared in 27 games and averaged 2.6 points and 1.3 rebounds per game while shooting 54% from the field. Montverde completed an undefeated season and won the Chipotle Nationals, the unofficial national high school championship.

For his senior year, Flagg transferred to Greensboro Day School in Greensboro, North Carolina, reuniting with legendary coach Freddy Johnson, who praised Flagg's leadership qualities. In February 2025, Flagg helped Greensboro Day School capture the NCISAA 3A state championship, contributing 11 points in a 46–39 victory over Concord Academy. It marked Flagg's third state title in three different states during his high school career.

=== Recruitment ===
Flagg was rated as a three-star recruit in the class of 2025 by ESPN. He received scholarship offers from multiple Division I programs, including West Virginia, George Washington, Saint Joseph's, Florida Gulf Coast, and the University of Richmond.

On October 30, 2024, Flagg announced his commitment to the University of Maine via social media.

== College career ==
In his freshman season for the University of Maine, Flagg has averaged 5.6 points and 3.9 rebounds for the 7-21 Black Bears (through February 2026). He has inked three Name, Image and Likeness (NIL) deals and is popular with the hometown crowds. On January 26, 2026, Flagg was named America East Rookie of the Week. On November 5, 2026, Flagg recorded his first career double double, recording 14 points and 10 rebounds in a 74-72 win against the Sacred Heart Pioneers.
