= John R. Wooden Award =

American college basketball award

- Awarded for: the most outstanding men's and women's college basketball players
- Country: United States
- Presented by: Los Angeles Athletic Club

History
- First award: 1977 (men); 2004 (women)
- Most recent: Cameron Boozer, Duke (men); Sarah Strong, UConn (women)
- Website: Official website

The John R. Wooden Award is an award given annually to the most outstanding men's and women's college basketball players. The Wooden Award program consists of the men's and women's player of the year awards, the Legends of Coaching Award, and recognizing All-America teams. The player of the year award was originally given only to men's basketball players starting in 1977 and expanded to women's players in 2004. Meanwhile, the Legends of Coaching Award was first presented in 1999.

The awards are given by the Los Angeles Athletic Club. They are named in honor of John Wooden, the 1932 national collegiate basketball player of the year from Purdue. Wooden later taught and coached men's basketball at Indiana State and UCLA. Coach Wooden, whose UCLA teams won 10 NCAA Division I championships, was the first man to be inducted into the Naismith Memorial Basketball Hall of Fame as both a player and a coach. His 1947–48 Indiana State team was the NAIA national runner-up.

== About the award ==
=== Selection process ===
At the end of each February, the award's National Advisory Board, a 26-member panel, selects 15 men's and 15 women's candidates for player of the year and All-American Team honors. After the Elite Eight, the field is narrowed to 10 finalists each. The winner's university receives a replica trophy. All-America Team members designated charities (official 501(c)(3)) receive a donation from the Wooden Award Foundation as a matching gift. The candidates must be full-time students and have a cumulative grade point average of 2.00 or higher throughout their college careers. Players who are nominated must have made outstanding contributions to team play, both offensively and defensively, and be model citizens, exhibiting strength of character both on and off the court. The selection ballot is announced prior to the NCAA tournament. The voters consist of 1,000 sportswriters and sportscasters representing the 50 states. The top 10 vote-getters are selected to the All-American Team and the results are announced following the Elite Eight round of the NCAA tournament. The person who receives the most votes is named the national player of the year, and the winner is announced following the NCAA championship game. The player of the year is awarded a trophy consisting of five bronze figures. The player's school receives a duplicate trophy as well as a scholarship grant. The other top four members of the All-American Team receive an All-American Team trophy, a jacket, and a scholarship grant which goes to their school. Each coach of the top five All-American Team members also receives a jacket. The All-American Team members ranked six through ten receive an All-American Team trophy and a jacket, but their schools do not receive a scholarship.

The criteria for the women's player of the year award and All-American Team honors are similar to those for the men. For the women's award, the National Advisory Board consists of 12 members, and approximately 15 candidates are selected for the ballot. The voters are 250 sportswriters and sportscasters. In contrast to the men's All-American Team, only five members are selected for the women's team. The national player of the year receives a trophy, and her school receives a duplicate trophy and a scholarship grant.

=== Trophy ===
The trophy features five bronze figures, each depicting one of the five major skills that Wooden believed that "total" basketball player must exhibit: rebounding, passing, shooting, dribbling, and defense. The concept for the trophy originated with Wooden Award Chairman, Richard "Duke" Llewellyn. Work began on the trophy in 1975, and sculptor Don Winton, who had sculpted many top sports awards, was given the task of designing the model of the trophy. The figures are bronze plated and attached to a pentagonal base plate. The tallest figure is 10 1/4 inches high (26 cm). The trophy's base is 7 1/2 inches high (19 cm), and is made from solid walnut. The total height of the trophy is 17 3/4 inches (45 cm), and it weighs 25 lb (11 kg).

=== Trademark dispute ===
In 1976, the Los Angeles Athletic Club was looking to establish the college basketball equivalent of football's Heisman trophy – a nationally prestigious award to be conferred upon the best basketball player in the nation. According to Wagonheim Law in Hunt Valley, Maryland, "The LAAC chose to name the award after John Wooden, who signed over the right to use his name to the LAAC, which trademarked it as soon as the contracts were signed. In January 2005, Wooden sought to influence another group for the better by working with a group known as Athletes for a Better World to recognize an athlete, regardless of sport, for contributions outside of the game. The award was dubbed The Wooden Cup. The LAAC balked, citing a violation of its trademark. Still able to size up the opposition after so many years removed from sport, John Wooden conceded."

== Key ==
Player (X)	Denotes the number of times the player has been awarded the Wooden Award at that point

== Wooden Award winners ==
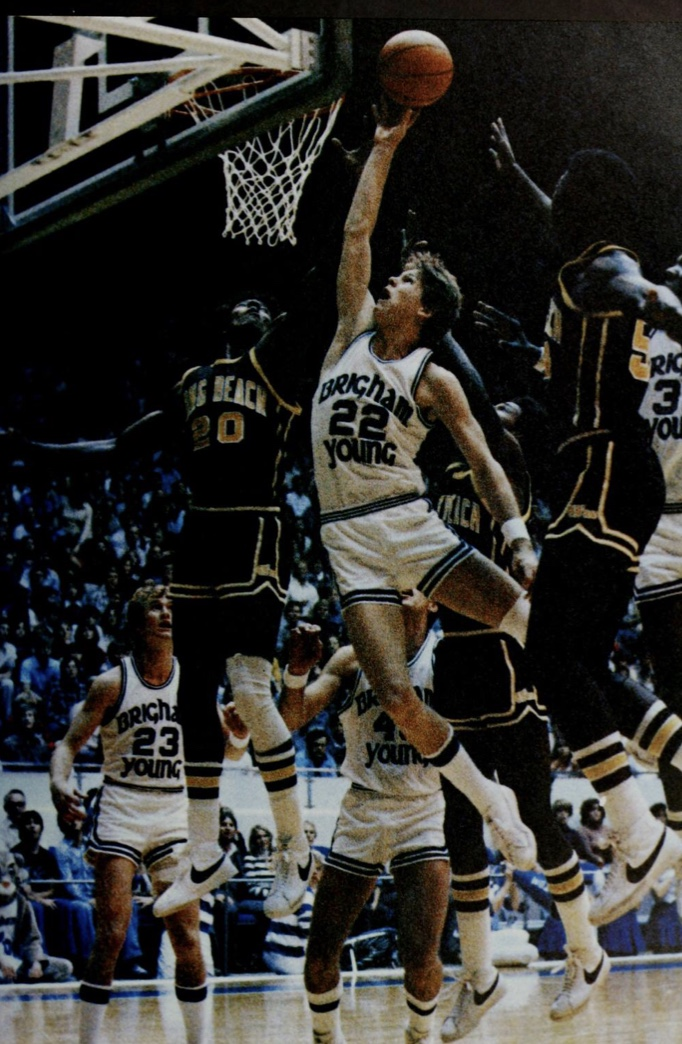
Danny Ainge, BYU, 1981

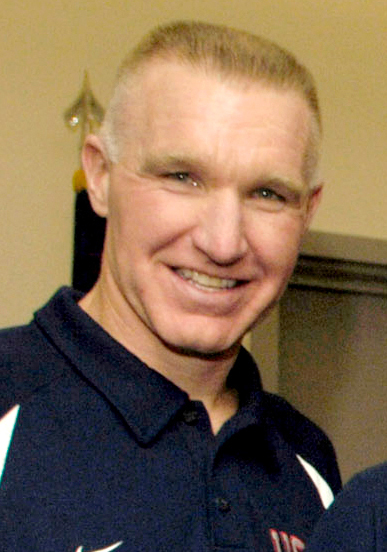
Chris Mullin, St. John's, 1985

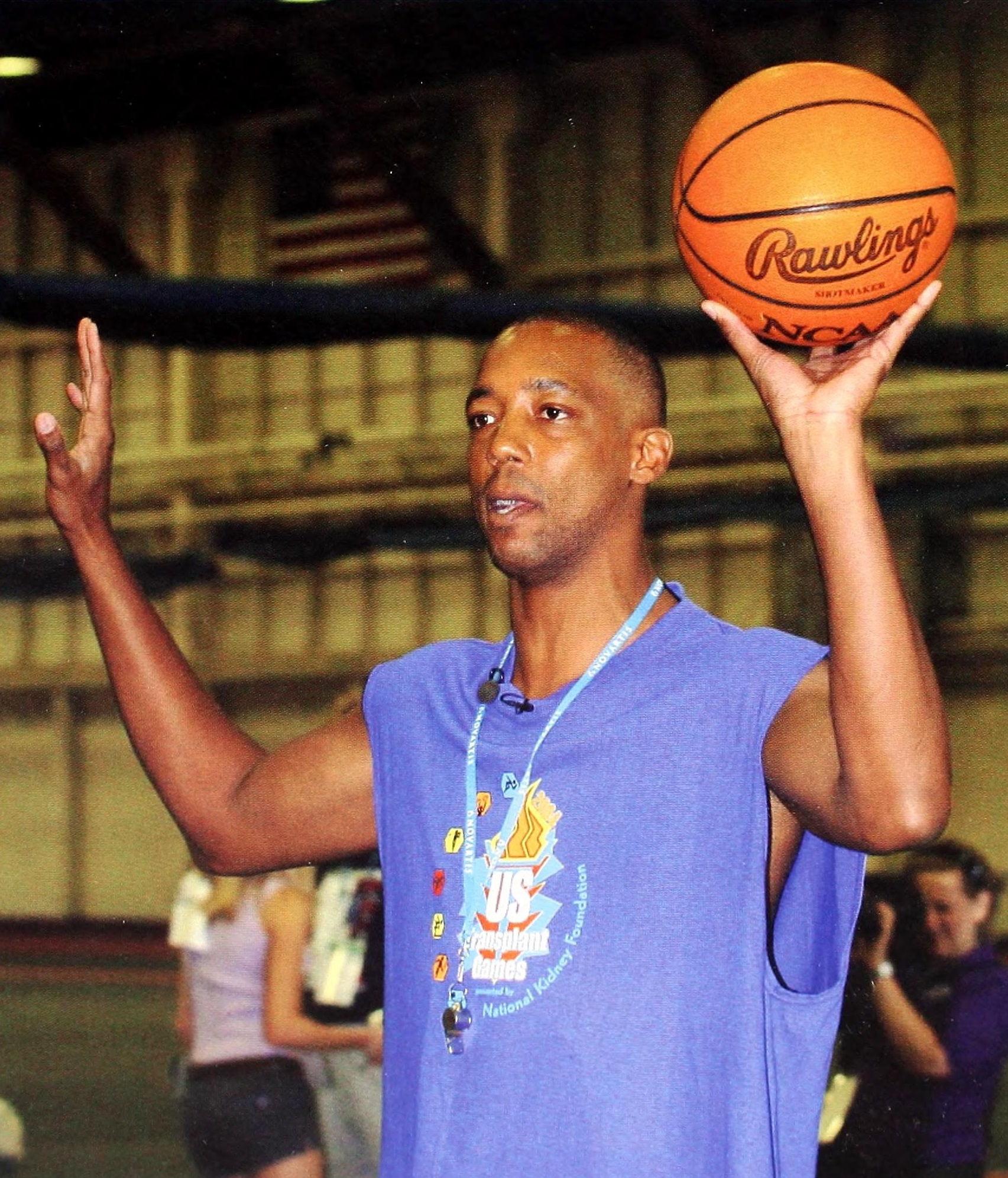
Sean Elliott, Arizona, 1989

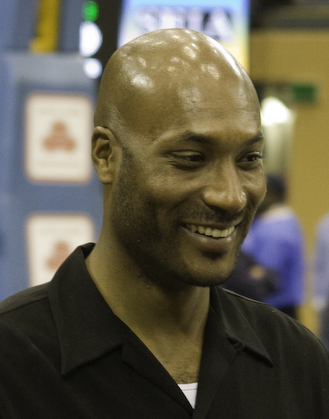
Ed O'Bannon, UCLA, 1995

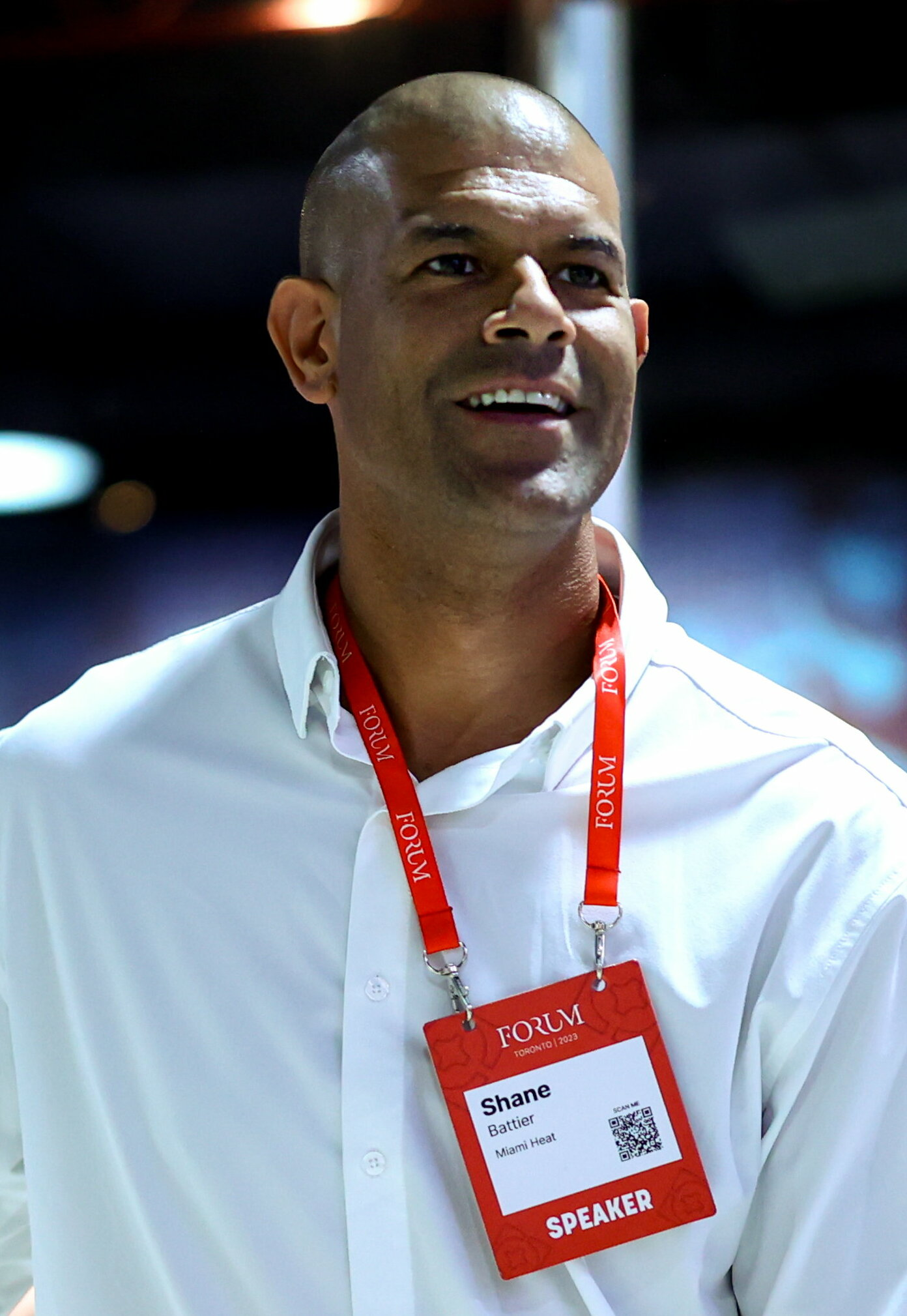
Shane Battier, Duke, 2001

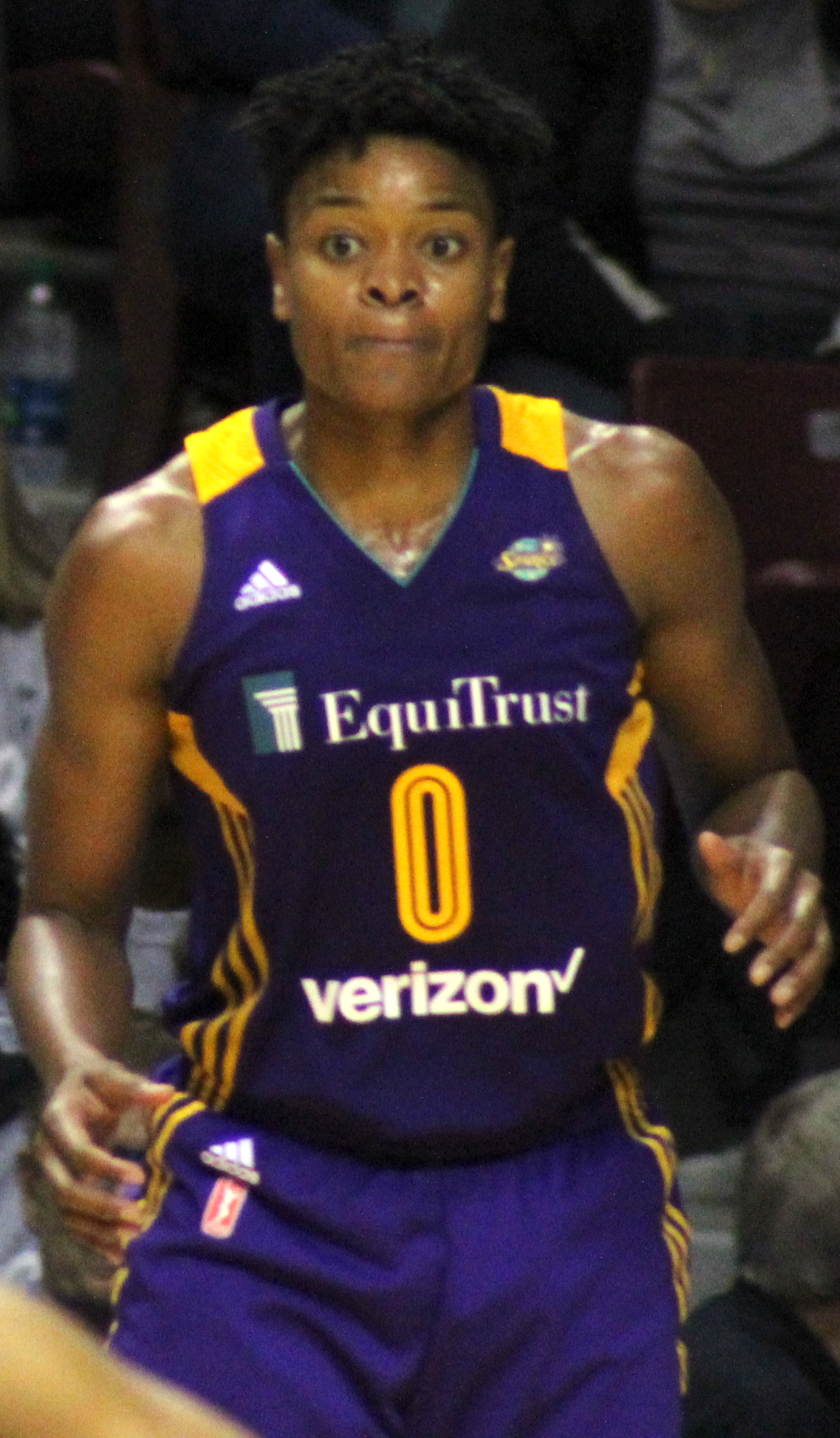
Alana Beard, Duke, 2004

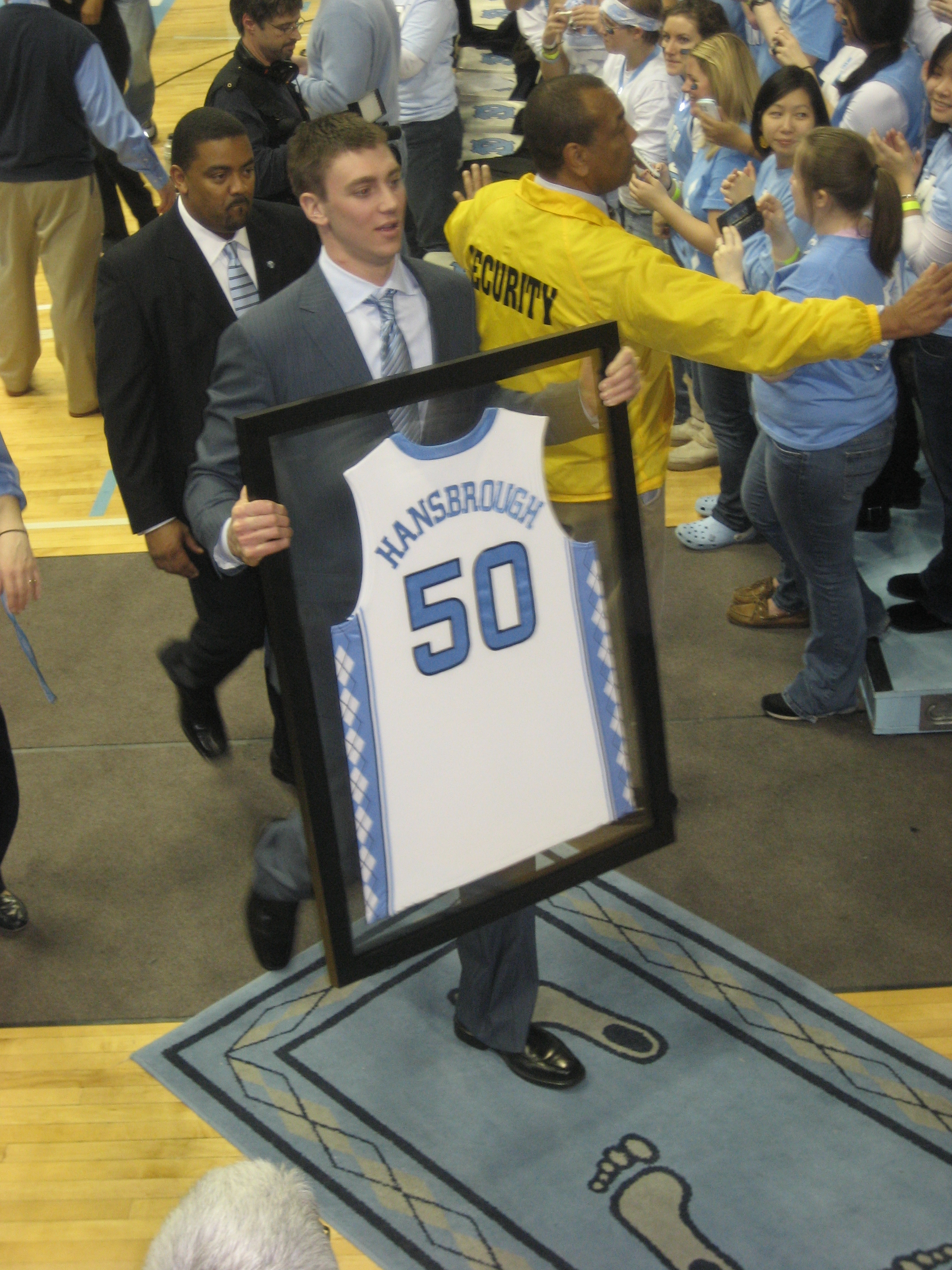
Tyler Hansbrough, North Carolina, 2008

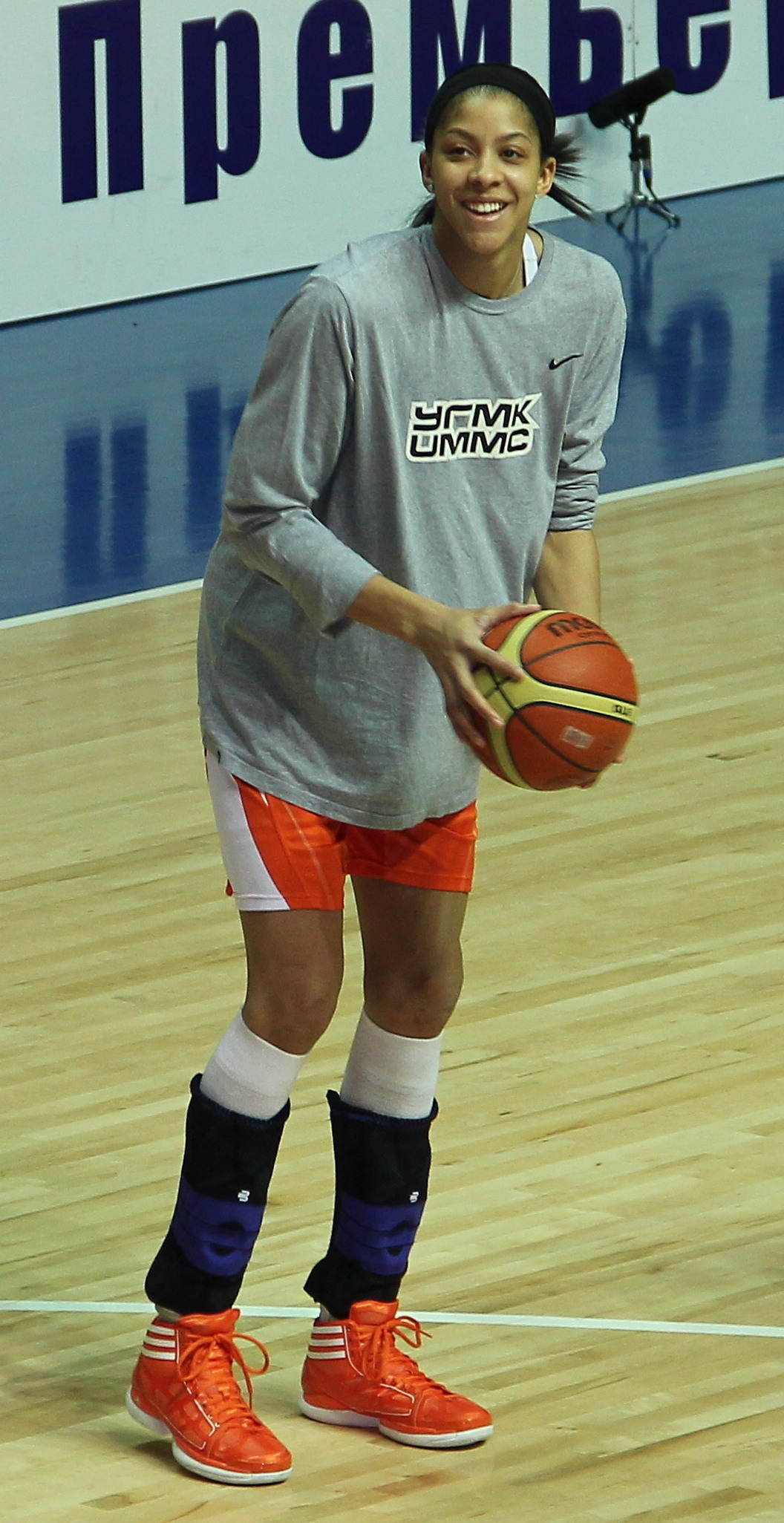
Candace Parker, Tennessee, 2007 and 2008

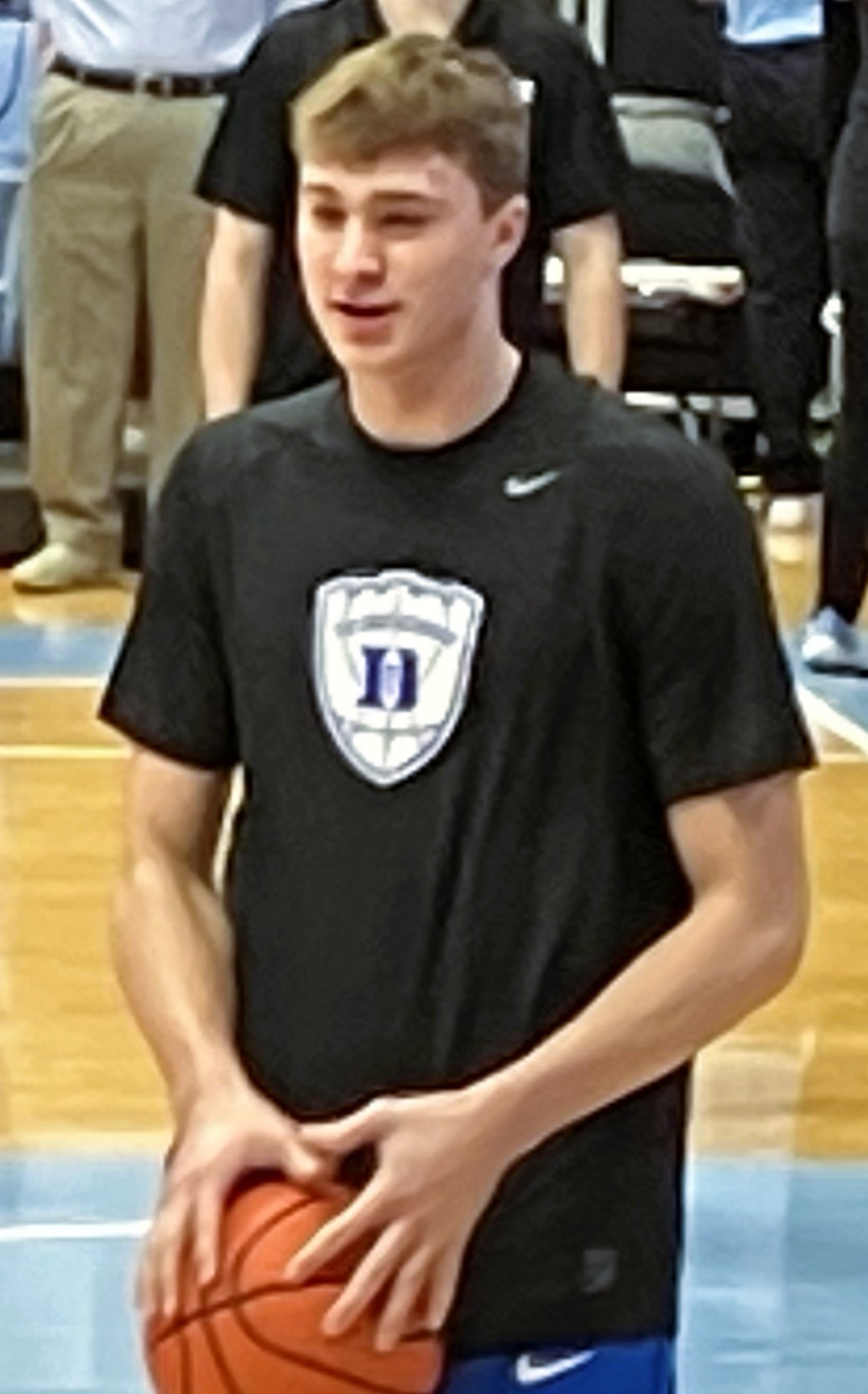
Cooper Flagg, Duke, 2025

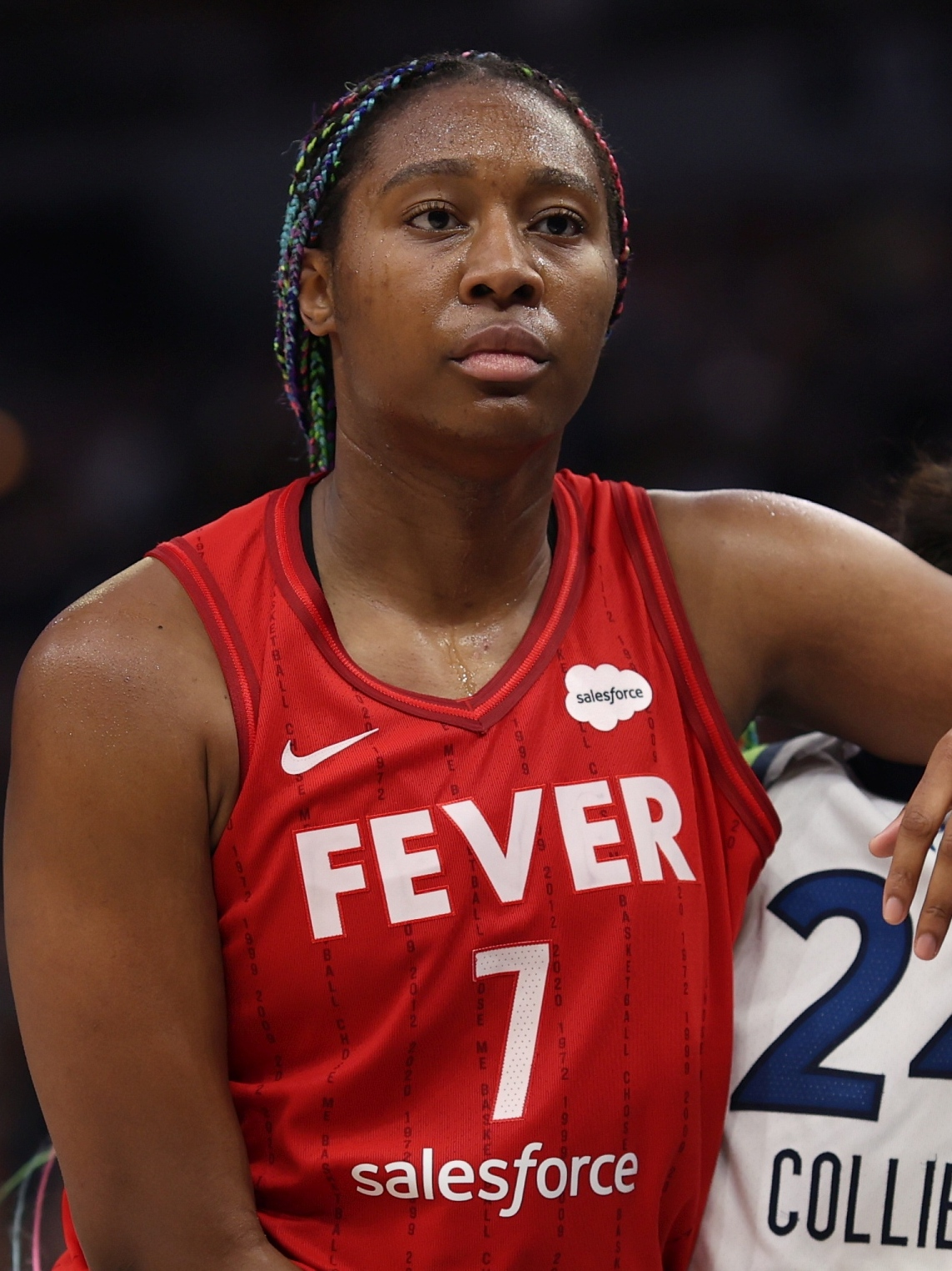
Aliyah Boston, South Carolina, 2022

Men
Season	Player	School	Position	Class	Reference
1976–77	Marques Johnson	UCLA	F	Senior	
1977–78	Phil Ford	North Carolina	PG	Senior	
1978–79	Larry Bird	Indiana State	SF	Senior	
1979–80	Darrell Griffith	Louisville	SG	Senior	
1980–81	Danny Ainge	BYU	SG	Senior	
1981–82	Ralph Sampson	Virginia	C	Junior	
1982–83	Ralph Sampson (2)	Virginia	C	Senior	
1983–84	Michael Jordan	North Carolina	SG	Junior	
1984–85	Chris Mullin	St. John's	SF / SG	Senior	
1985–86	Walter Berry	St. John's	PF	Senior	
1986–87	David Robinson	Navy	C	Senior	
1987–88	Danny Manning	Kansas	PF	Senior	
1988–89	Sean Elliott	Arizona	SF	Senior	
1989–90	Lionel Simmons	La Salle	SF	Senior	
1990–91	Larry Johnson	UNLV	PF	Senior	
1991–92	Christian Laettner	Duke	F	Senior	
1992–93	Calbert Cheaney	Indiana	SF	Senior	
1993–94	Glenn Robinson	Purdue	SF / PF	Junior	
1994–95	Ed O'Bannon	UCLA	SF	Senior	
1995–96	Marcus Camby	UMass	C	Junior	
1996–97	Tim Duncan	Wake Forest	C	Senior	
1997–98	Antawn Jamison	North Carolina	PF	Junior	
1998–99	Elton Brand	Duke	C	Sophomore	
1999–00	Kenyon Martin	Cincinnati	PF	Senior	
2000–01	Shane Battier	Duke	SF / PF	Senior	
2001–02	Jason Williams	Duke	PG	Junior	
2002–03	T. J. Ford	Texas	PG	Sophomore	
2003–04	Jameer Nelson	Saint Joseph's	PG	Senior	
2004–05	Andrew Bogut	Utah	C	Sophomore	
2005–06	JJ Redick	Duke	SG	Senior	
2006–07	Kevin Durant	Texas	SF	Freshman	
2007–08	Tyler Hansbrough	North Carolina	PF	Junior	
2008–09	Blake Griffin	Oklahoma	PF	Sophomore	
2009–10	Evan Turner	Ohio State	SF	Junior	
2010–11	Jimmer Fredette	BYU	PG	Senior	
2011–12	Anthony Davis	Kentucky	C	Freshman	
2012–13	Trey Burke	Michigan	PG	Sophomore	
2013–14	Doug McDermott	Creighton	SF / PF	Senior	
2014–15	Frank Kaminsky	Wisconsin	PF	Senior	
2015–16	Buddy Hield	Oklahoma	SG	Senior	
2016–17	Frank Mason III	Kansas	PG	Senior	
2017–18	Jalen Brunson	Villanova	PG	Junior	
2018–19	Zion Williamson	Duke	SF / PF	Freshman	
2019–20	Obi Toppin	Dayton	PF	Sophomore	
2020–21	Luka Garza	Iowa	C	Senior	
2021–22	Oscar Tshiebwe	Kentucky	C	Junior	
2022–23	Zach Edey	Purdue	C	Junior	
2023–24	Zach Edey (2)	Purdue	C	Senior	
2024–25	Cooper Flagg	Duke	SG / SF	Freshman	
2025–26	Cameron Boozer	Duke	PF	Freshman	

Women
Season	Player	School	Position	Class	Reference
1976–77	No award				
1977–78	No award				
1978–79	No award				
1979–80	No award				
1980–81	No award				
1981–82	No award				
1982–83	No award				
1983–84	No award				
1984–85	No award				
1985–86	No award				
1986–87	No award				
1987–88	No award				
1988–89	No award				
1989–90	No award				
1990–91	No award				
1991–92	No award				
1992–93	No award				
1993–94	No award				
1994–95	No award				
1995–96	No award				
1996–97	No award				
1997–98	No award				
1998–99	No award				
1999–00	No award				
2000–01	No award				
2001–02	No award				
2002–03	No award				
2003–04	Alana Beard	Duke	SG / SF	Senior	
2004–05	Seimone Augustus	LSU	SG / SF	Junior	
2005–06	Seimone Augustus (2)	LSU	SG / SF	Senior	
2006–07	Candace Parker	Tennessee	PF	Junior	
2007–08	Candace Parker (2)	Tennessee	PF	Senior	
2008–09	Maya Moore	UConn	PF	Sophomore	
2009–10	Tina Charles	UConn	C	Senior	
2010–11	Maya Moore (2)	UConn	PF	Senior	
2011–12	Brittney Griner	Baylor	C	Junior	
2012–13	Brittney Griner (2)	Baylor	C	Senior	
2013–14	Chiney Ogwumike	Stanford	PF	Senior	
2014–15	Breanna Stewart	UConn	PF	Junior	
2015–16	Breanna Stewart (2)	UConn	PF	Senior	
2016–17	Kelsey Plum	Washington	PG	Senior	
2017–18	A'ja Wilson	South Carolina	C	Senior	
2018–19	Sabrina Ionescu	Oregon	PG	Junior	
2019–20	Sabrina Ionescu (2)	Oregon	PG	Senior	
2020–21	Paige Bueckers	UConn	PG	Freshman	
2021–22	Aliyah Boston	South Carolina	PF / C	Junior	
2022–23	Caitlin Clark	Iowa	PG	Junior	
2023–24	Caitlin Clark (2)	Iowa	PG	Senior	
2024–25	JuJu Watkins	USC	SG	Sophomore	
2025–26	Sarah Strong	UConn	SF	Sophomore	

== Legends of Coaching Award ==
Wooden Legends of Coaching Award
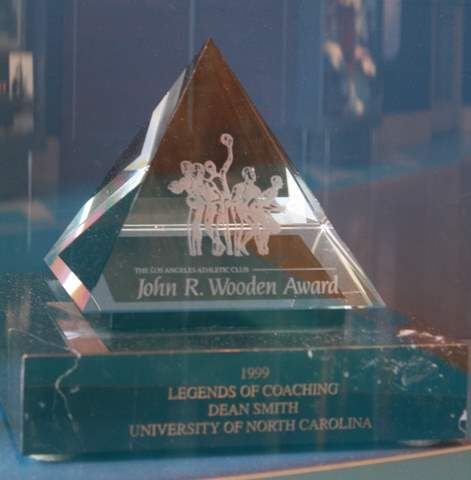
- Dean Smith's 1999 award
- Awarded for: head college basketball coaches exemplifying high standards of coaching success and personal achievement
- Country: United States
- Presented by: Los Angeles Athletic Club

History
- First award: 1999
- Most recent: Matt Painter, Purdue
- Website: Official website

The Legends of Coaching Award recognizes the lifetime achievement of coaches who exemplify Coach Wooden's high standards of coaching success and personal achievement. When selecting the individual, the Wooden Award Committee considers a coach's character, success rate on the court, graduating rate of student athletes, his or her coaching philosophy, and identification with the goals of the John R. Wooden Award. This award is bestowed upon both men's and women's coaches. The first recipient who was never a head coach in NCAA Division I was 2021 recipient Dave Yanai, whose entire head coaching career was in NCAA Division II.

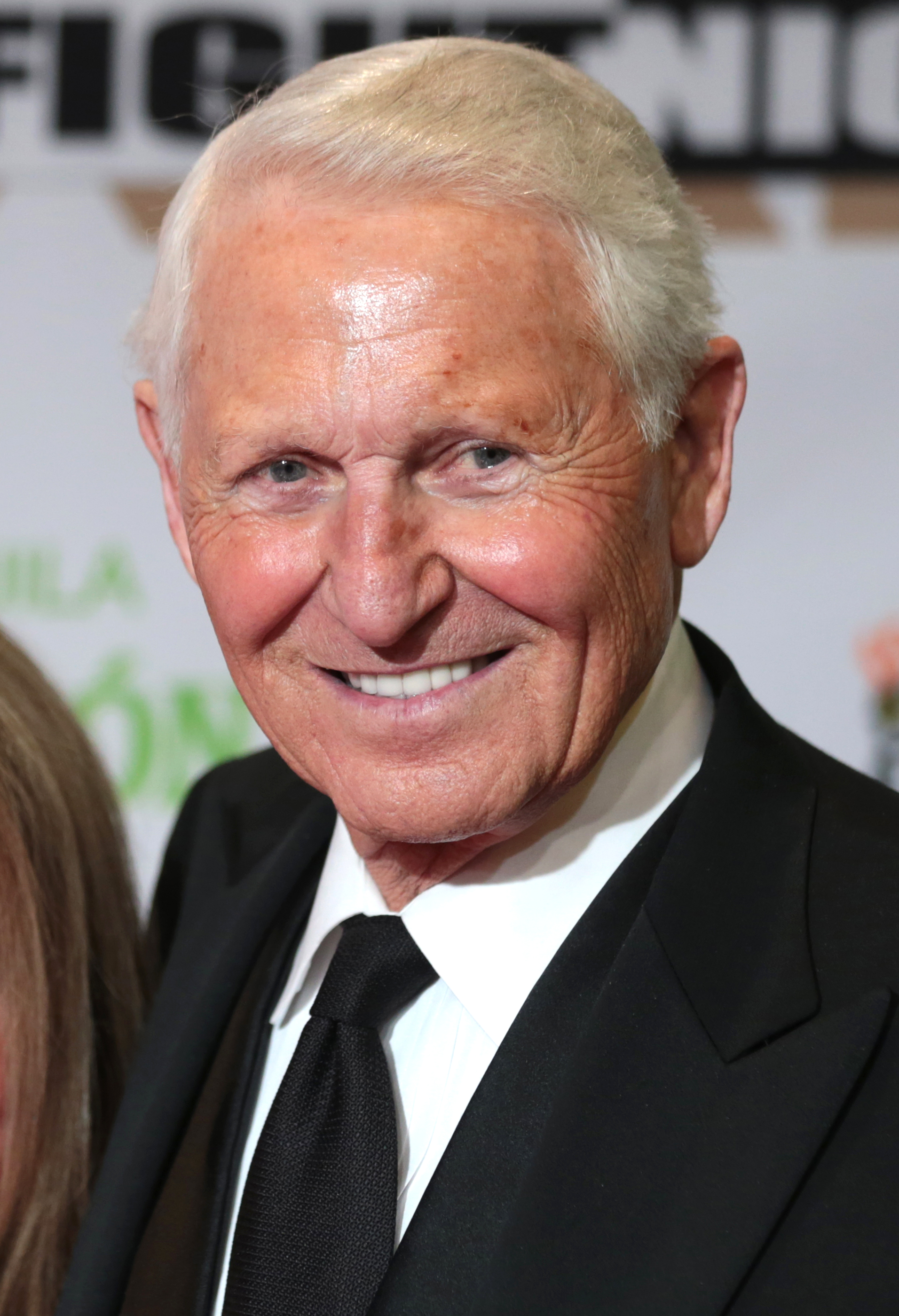
Lute Olson

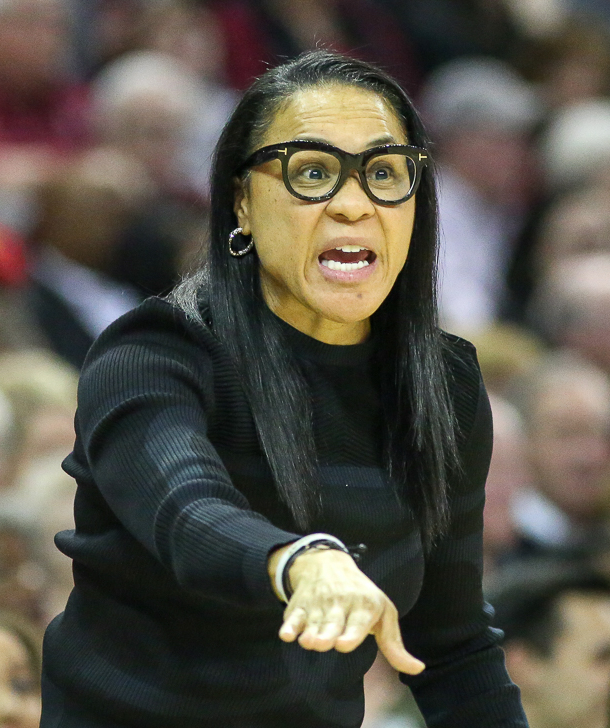
Dawn Staley

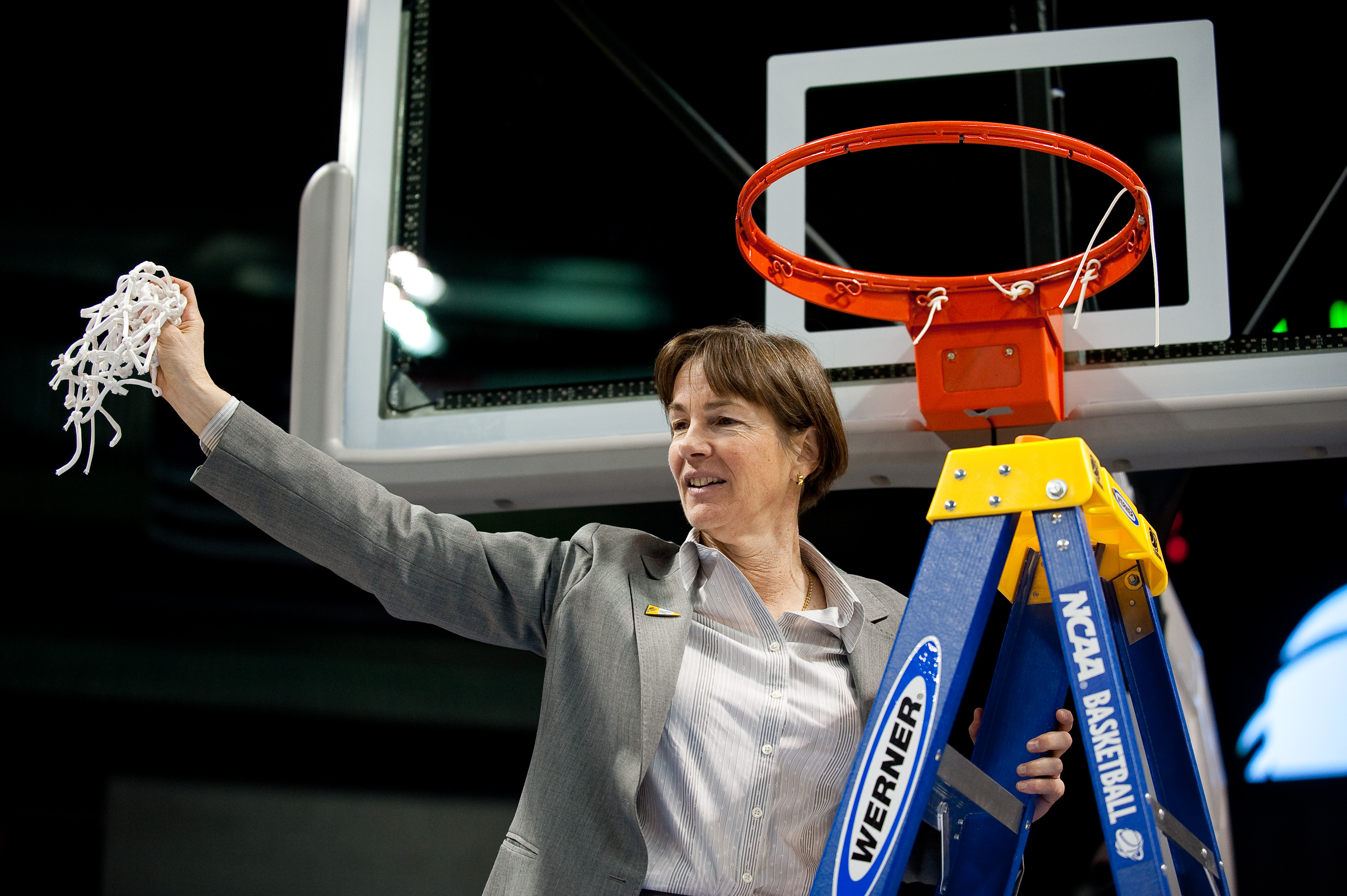
Tara VanDerveer

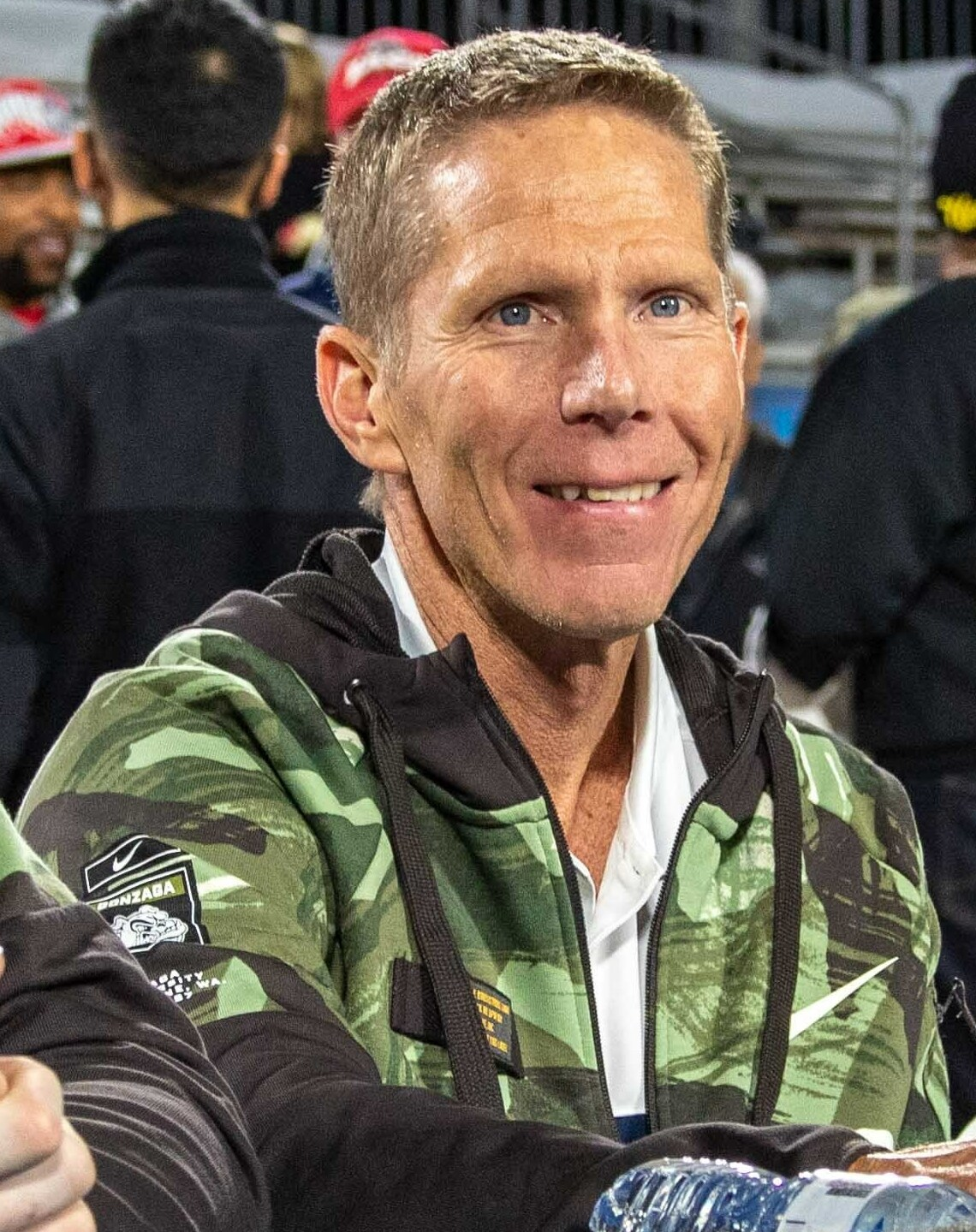
Mark Few

Season	Coach	School^{[a]}	Reference
1998–99	Dean Smith	North Carolina	
1999–00	Mike Krzyzewski	Duke	
2000–01	Lute Olson	Arizona	
2001–02	Denny Crum	Louisville	
2002–03	Roy Williams	Kansas	
2003–04	Mike Montgomery	Stanford	
2004–05	Jim Calhoun	UConn	
2005–06	Jim Boeheim	Syracuse	
2006–07	Gene Keady	Purdue	
2007–08	Pat Summitt	Tennessee (women)	
2008–09	Rick Barnes	Texas	
2009–10	Billy Donovan	Florida	
2010–11	Tom Izzo	Michigan State	
2011–12	Geno Auriemma	UConn (women)	
2012–13	Bill Self	Kansas	
2013–14	Tara VanDerveer	Stanford (women)	
2014–15	Steve Fisher	San Diego State	
2015–16	Tubby Smith	Texas Tech	
2016–17	Muffet McGraw	Notre Dame (women)	
2017–18	Jay Wright	Villanova	
2018–19	Lon Kruger	Oklahoma	
2019–20	C. Vivian Stringer	Rutgers (women)	
2020–21	Dave Yanai	Cal State Los Angeles	
2021–22	Rick Byrd	Belmont	
2022–23	Dawn Staley	South Carolina (women)	
2023–24	John Calipari	Kentucky	
2024–25	Mark Few	Gonzaga	
2025–26	Matt Painter	Purdue	

- ^{a} The school at which these coaches were presented the Legends of Coaching Award is only listed, for conciseness. Some of them have coached at multiple schools throughout their careers.

== See also ==
- List of U.S. men's college basketball national player of the year awards
