= Dean Cray =

American politician

Dean A. Cray

Member of the Maine House of Representatives for the 28th District
- In office December 2008 – December 2014

Personal details
- Born: March 5, 1958 (age 68) Dexter, Maine
- Party: Republican
- Education: Nokomis Regional High School

Dean A. Cray (born March 5, 1958) is an American politician from Maine. A Republican, Cray served in the Maine House of Representatives (District 28) from 2008 to 2014. District 28 included much of southern Somerset County, including Canaan, Cornville, Hartland, Palmyra, and St. Albans. Cray is the former ranking minority member of the Agriculture, Conservation and Forestry Committee. Prior to being elected to the House of Representatives, Cray served on the Board of Selectmen of Palmyra for 10 years.

== Personal ==
Cray, who was born in Dexter, Maine on March 5, 1958, is a graduate of Nokomis Regional High School in Newport, Maine.
