= Dave Yanai =

American basketball coach

David Hiroshi Yanai (born 1943) is a retired basketball coach from the 1960s to 2000s. Yanai primarily coached boys basketball from the late 1960s to mid-1970s with Fremont High School. During this time period, Yanai won the 1975 CIF Los Angeles City Section title in boys basketball with Fremont. He continued his boys basketball career with Gardena High School during the late 1970s. As a high school coach, Yanai had 120 wins and 31 losses.

In men's basketball, Yanai accumulated 288 wins and 233 losses as coach of the Cal State Dominguez Hills Toros. While with Dominguez Hills from 1977 to 1996, Yanai appeared at the 1979 NAIA basketball tournament and 1981 NCAA Division II Basketball Tournament. He also was the first coach of Japanese American descent for an American college basketball team during his time at Dominguez Hills. As coach of the Cal State Los Angeles Golden Eagles from 1996 to 2005, Yanai and his team were at the regional semifinals of the 1998 NCAA Division II men's basketball tournament. He ended his basketball coaching career in 2005 following 114 wins and 131 losses with Los Angeles. Yanai received the Legends of Coaching Award during 2021.

== Early life and education ==
In 1943, Yanai was born during World War II in Manzanar. When the war ended, Yanai and his parents moved to Gardena, California, alongside his six siblings. Growing up, Yanai was a second baseman. For his post-secondary education, Yanai went to California State University, Long Beach, during the 1960s.

== Career ==
=== High school ===
In the late 1960s, Yanai went to Los Angeles to work as a baseball coach for Fremont High School. While at Fremont, Yanai became a basketball coach in 1969. During the 1970s, Fremont reached the boys' basketball final for the CIF Los Angeles City Section title. In individual years, Yanai and Fremont were runner-ups in 1972 and 1974. In 1975, he won the CIF boys' basketball title for Los Angeles City with Fremont.

The following year, Yanai left Fremont to coach for Gardena High School. With Gardena from 1976 to 1977, Yanai and his team made it to the semifinals of the Los Angeles City tournament for the 3A section. With the two schools, Yanai had a combined total of 120 wins and 31 losses as a basketball coach.

=== University ===
In 1977, Yanai moved from high school basketball when he became coach of the Cal State Dominguez Hills Toros. With the Toros, Yanai and Dominguez Hills reached the first round of the 1979 NAIA basketball tournament. While Dominguez Hills was part of the National Association of Intercollegiate Athletics, Yanai had 44 wins and 37 losses between 1977 and 1980. In 1980, Yanai and Dominguez Hills joined the California Collegiate Athletic Association.

In 1981, Yanai and his team were first in the CCAA. At the CCAA men's basketball tournament, he won this tournament with the Toros in 1987. Yanai appeared at the final of the West region during the 1981 NCAA Division II Basketball Tournament. With his combined 244 wins and 186 losses in the NCAA, Yanai had 288 wins and 233 losses before he finished his coaching position at Dominguez Hills in 1996. Yanai was also an assistant coach for the men's basketball event at the 1990 U.S. Olympic Festival while with Dominguez Hills.

In 1996, Yanai joined the Cal State Los Angeles Golden Eagles as their men's basketball coach. His team reached the regional semifinals at the 1998 NCAA Division II men's basketball tournament. Yanai remained with Los Angeles until he ended his basketball career in 2005. With Los Angeles, Yanai had 114 wins and 131 losses.

=== Additional positions ===
During his coaching experience, Yanai taught basketball in Japan during the mid-1980s. Yanai was also working for them as an advisor before he retired from basketball during the mid-2000s. In California, Yanai held basketball camps for teenagers by the late 1980s. Yanai's sports experience also included a position in drug prevention and working in youth sports.

== Honors and personal life ==
With Dominguez Hills, Yanai was Coach of the Year in men's basketball for the CCAA in 1987 and 1988. While with the Toros, Yanai was the first coach for an American college basketball team of Japanese American descent. He remained the only Japanese American to hold this position until Jeff Hironaka became a coach in the 2000s. Yanai has held the record for most wins at Dominguez Hills for over twenty years leading up to the 2020–21 season.

He was an award recipient at the 2000 John R. Wooden Awards. In 2010, the Dave Yanai Court was opened as part of the Torodome for Dominguez Hills. In 2021, the John R. Wooden Award Committee gave Yanai the Legends of Coaching Award. With the Legends of Coaching Award, Yanai became the first coach of a Division II school to be chosen for this award. He had two kids during his marriage.
