= Cooper Flagg =

American basketball player (born 2006)

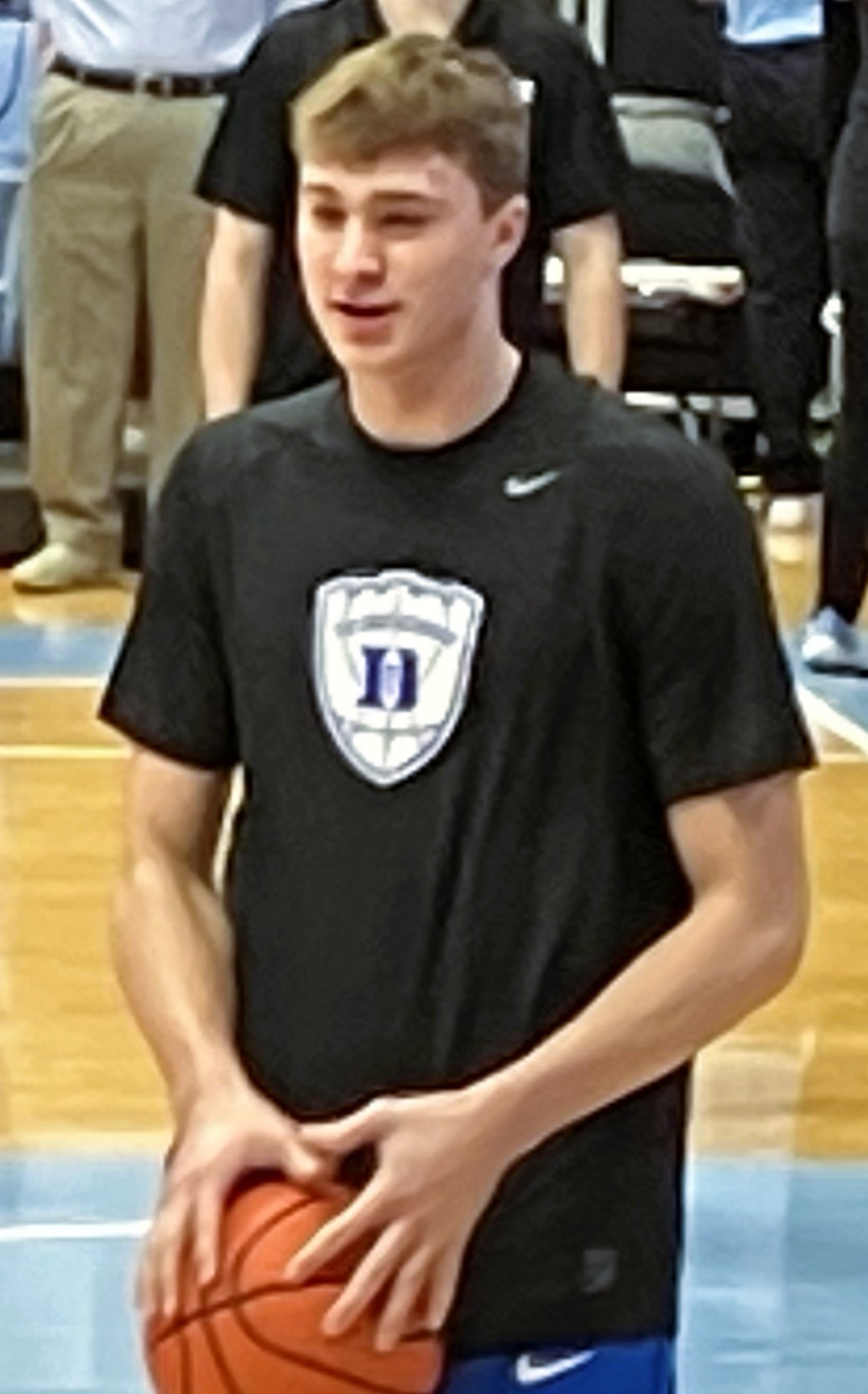
- Flagg with the Duke Blue Devils in 2025

No. 32 – Dallas Mavericks
- Position: Small forward
- League: NBA

Personal information
- Born: December 21, 2006 (age 19) Newport, Maine, U.S.
- Listed height: 6 ft 10 in (2.08 m)
- Listed weight: 205 lb (93 kg)

Career information
- High school: Nokomis Regional (Newport, Maine); Montverde Academy (Montverde, Florida)
- College: Duke (2024–2025)
- NBA draft: 2025: 1st round, 1st overall pick
- Drafted by: Dallas Mavericks
- Playing career: 2025–present

Career history
- 2025–present: Dallas Mavericks

Career highlights
- NBA Rookie of the Year (2026); NBA All-Rookie First Team (2026); National college player of the year (2025); Consensus first-team All-American (2025); Lute Olson Award (2025); Julius Erving Award (2025); Wayman Tisdale Award (2025); NABC Freshman of the Year (2025); ACC Male Athlete of the Year (2025); ACC Player of the Year (2025); First-team All-ACC (2025); ACC Rookie of the Year (2025); ACC All-Defensive team (2025); ACC All-Freshman Team (2025); National high school player of the year (2024); McDonald's All-American (2024); Gatorade National Men's Athlete of the Year (2024); USA Basketball Male Athlete of the Year (2022)
- Stats at NBA.com
- Stats at Basketball Reference
Medals
Men's basketball
Representing the United States
FIBA Under-17 World Cup
| Gold medal – first place | 2022 Spain | Team |

Cooper Flagg (born December 21, 2006) is an American professional basketball player for the Dallas Mavericks of the National Basketball Association (NBA). He was the first overall pick of the 2025 NBA draft, selected by the Mavericks, and became that season's Rookie of the Year.

Mainly a forward, Flagg began his high school career at Nokomis Regional High School in Newport, Maine, before transferring to Montverde Academy in Montverde, Florida, where he won multiple national high school player of the year honors as a senior. Ranked as the top recruit in the 2024 class, Flagg played college basketball for the Duke Blue Devils, earning both consensus first-team All-American and consensus national player of the year honors as a freshman.

== Early life and high school career ==
Flagg was born in Newport, Maine, and initially attended Nokomis Regional High School. He became the first freshman to be named the Maine Gatorade Player of the Year after averaging 20.5 points, 10 rebounds, 6.2 assists, 3.7 steals and 3.7 blocks per game. Nokomis won the Class A state championship with Flagg scoring 22 points and grabbing 16 rebounds in a 43–27 win against Falmouth High School in the state final.

Flagg transferred to Montverde Academy in Montverde, Florida, at the end of his freshman year of high school. Prior to the beginning of his first year at the school, he played in the Nike Elite Youth Basketball League (EYBL) for the Florida Eagles, an Amateur Athletic Union team affiliated with Montverde. Flagg was named the MVP of the 2023 Hoophall Classic after scoring 21 points with five steals, five rebounds and three assists in Montverde's 85–63 victory over La Lumiere Academy. He also was named a semifinalist for the Naismith Prep Player of the Year Award. Flagg averaged 9.8 points, 5.2 rebounds, and three assists per game in his first season at Montverde. After the season, he played for Maine United in the EYBL and averaged 25.4 points, 13 rebounds, 5.7 assists, and 6.9 blocks in seven games at the Peach Jam tournament. Flagg reclassified to the 2024 recruiting class after his sophomore year.

Flagg was selected to play in the 2024 McDonald's All-American Boys Game. On March 27, 2024, he was named Gatorade National Player of the Year. Flagg was also named Mr. Basketball USA and the Naismith Prep Player of the Year. He finished the season averaging 16.4 points, 7.5 rebounds, 3.8 assists, and 2.7 blocks per game during his final high school season while leading the Eagles to a perfect 34–0 record and the program's eighth national title.

=== Recruiting ===
Flagg was ranked the third-best prospect in the 2025 recruiting class following his freshman season. He re-ranked as the class's second-best recruit in August 2022 following the 2022 FIBA Under-17 Basketball World Cup. Flagg received his first NCAA Division I scholarship offer from Bryant while in the eighth grade.

Flagg reclassified to the class of 2024 during the summer after his sophomore year. On October 30, 2023, Flagg verbally committed to play for Duke after also considering an offer from the University of Connecticut. He had initially planned to announce his commitment on October 27, but pushed it back in the aftermath of the 2023 Lewiston shootings in his home state of Maine. Flagg signed a National Letter of Intent to play for the Blue Devils on November 8, 2023, during the early signing period. Flagg finished as the highest rated recruit in the 2024 class.

College recruiting
| Name | Hometown | School | Height | Weight | Commit date |
|---|---|---|---|---|---|
| Cooper Flagg; SF | Newport, ME | Montverde Academy (FL) | 6 ft 8 in (2.03 m) | 200 lb (91 kg) | Oct 30, 2023 |
| Cooper Flagg; SF | Recruit ratings: Rivals: 247Sports: On3: ESPN: (97) | | | | |
Overall recruit ranking: Rivals: 1 247Sports: 1 On3: 1 ESPN: 1
Note: In many cases, Scout, Rivals, 247Sports, On3, and ESPN may conflict in their listings of height and weight.; In these cases, the average was taken. ESPN grades are on a 100-point scale.; Sources: "Duke 2024 Basketball Commitments". Rivals.; "2024 Duke Blue Devils Recruiting Class". ESPN.; "2024 Team Ranking". Rivals.

== College career ==
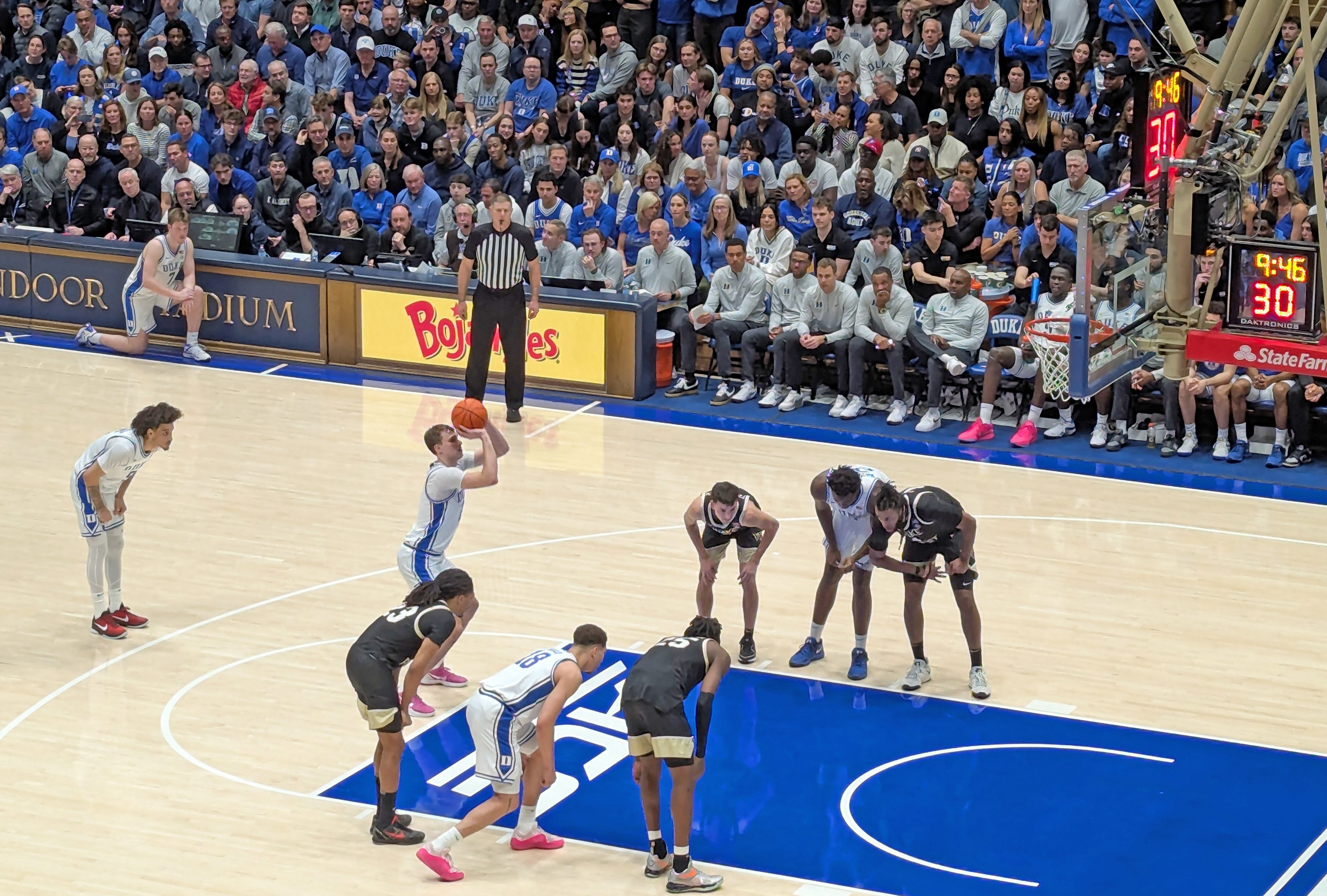
Cooper Flagg second half free throw vs Wake Forest

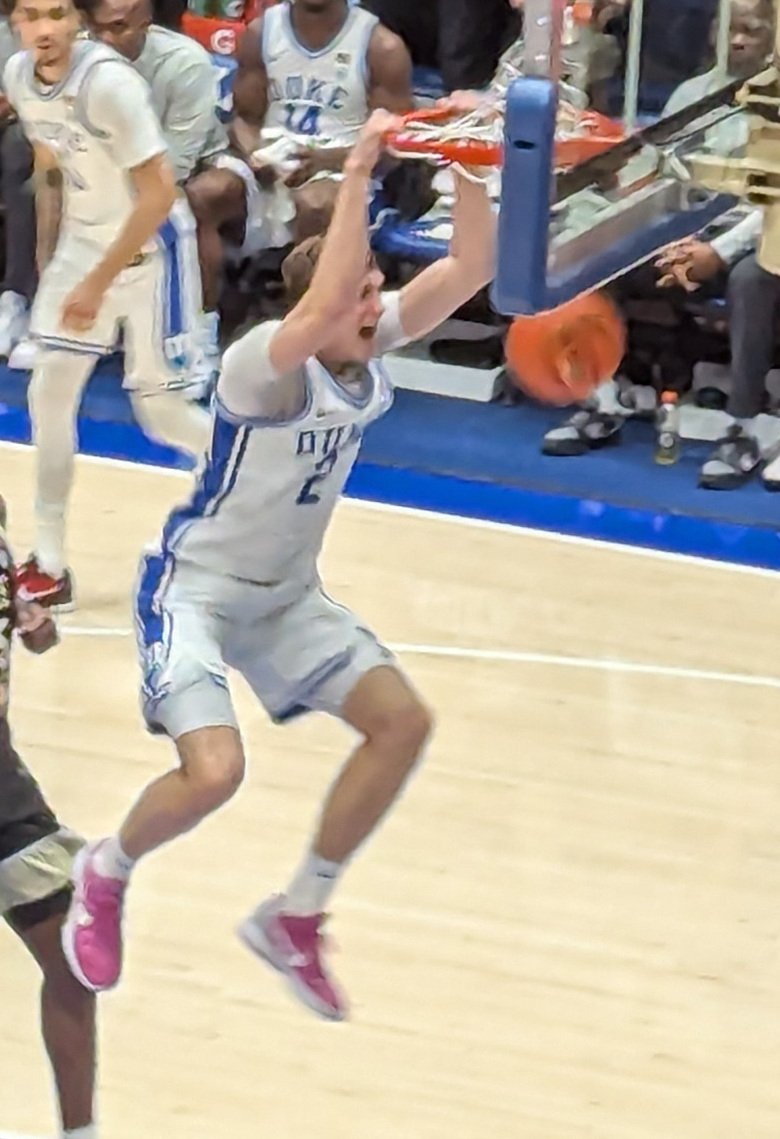
Flagg in March 2025

Flagg enrolled at Duke University in June 2024 to take part in the Blue Devils' summer practices. He made his college basketball debut during Duke's season opener against Maine on November 4, 2024, and scored 18 points with seven rebounds, five assists and three steals in a 96–62 win. On November 18, Flagg earned Atlantic Coast Conference (ACC) rookie of the week honors. On December 31, he scored 24 points, six assists and four steals in a 88–65 win over Virginia Tech. On January 4, 2025, Flagg had a double-double of 24 points and 11 rebounds in a 89–62 win against SMU.

Flagg delivered a record-breaking performance in Duke's victory against Notre Dame on January 11, 2025. He scored 42 points, grabbed six rebounds and tallied seven assists, shooting 11 of 14 from the field, 4 of 6 from three-point range and 16 of 17 from the free-throw line. This set new freshman scoring records for both Duke University and the ACC. On January 18, Flagg scored 28 points and five rebounds in a 88–63 win over Boston College. On January 25, 2025, Flagg scored 24 points, seven rebounds and six assists in a 63–56 win over Wake Forest. On January 27, Flagg scored 28 points and seven rebounds in a 74–64 victory against NC State. On February 1, Flagg tallied 21 points, eight rebounds and seven assists in a 87–70 win against arch-rival North Carolina. On February 12, Flagg scored 27 points and five rebounds in a 78–57 win against California. On February 17, Flagg had a double-double of 17 points and 14 rebounds in a 80–62 win over Virginia. He became the first ACC player with 500-plus points, 100-plus assists and 30 blocks in the regular season in the last 25 years. On March 3, Flagg scored 28 and tallied eight rebounds and seven assists in a 93–60 victory against Wake Forest.

Flagg led the Blue Devils to the ACC regular-season title, as Duke finished 19–1 in conference play. On March 13, 2025, Duke would go on to defeat Georgia Tech 78–70 in the quarterfinals of the ACC Tournament despite Flagg leaving the game due to a sprained ankle injury, which forced him to miss the rest of the tournament. On March 15, Duke defeated Louisville 73–62 in the ACC tournament championship game. Flagg and Duke entered the NCAA Tournament as the No. 1 seed in the East region and defeated both Mount St. Mary's and Baylor in the first and second rounds of the tournament. On March 27, Flagg scored 30 points, six rebounds and seven assists in a 100–93 win over Arizona in the Sweet 16. On March 29, Flagg added 16 points and nine rebounds in a 85–65 victory against Alabama in the Elite Eight. On April 5, Flagg scored 27 points, seven rebounds and three blocks in a 70–67 loss against Houston in the Final Four. Following his freshman season, Flagg declared for the 2025 NBA draft, forgoing his remaining college eligibility.

He was named the ACC Player of the Year and ACC Rookie of the Year, joining Zion Williamson, Marvin Bagley III and Jahlil Okafor as the only players in conference history to win both awards in the same season.

== Professional career ==
=== Dallas Mavericks (2025–present) ===
==== Rookie of the Year (2025–2026) ====
Flagg was selected with the first overall pick by the Dallas Mavericks in the 2025 NBA draft. He was signed on July 2, 2025. In his NBA regular-season debut on October 22, Flagg started as a point guard and a primary ball handler; he put up 10 points, 10 rebounds and one steal in a 125–92 loss to the San Antonio Spurs.

On November 10, Flagg tied LeBron James as the youngest player to score at least 25 points in an NBA game at age 18 years and 324 days when he posted 26 points against the Milwaukee Bucks. On November 28, Flagg became the youngest player to record ten assists in an NBA game (18 years and 343 days), surpassing James by twelve days in a loss to James's Lakers. The next night, Flagg scored a career-high 35 points in a 114–110 win over the Los Angeles Clippers, becoming the youngest player to do so, surpassing James. He also joined LeBron James as the only players to score 30-plus points in a game before turning 19 years old. In his first seven games, he started at point guard and averaged 13.7 points, 6.3 rebounds and 2.9 assists, shooting 38%. After being moved to forward, he averaged 20 points, 6.9 rebounds and 3.7 assists on 51% shooting over his next 15 games. On December 15, Flagg put up 42 points in a 140–133 overtime loss to the Utah Jazz. He became the youngest player in NBA history to score at least 40 points in a game. At 18 years and 359 days, he was 94 days younger than previous record holder LeBron James who scored 41 on March 27, 2004. On December 25, Flagg recorded 27 points, six rebounds and five assists in a 126–116 loss to the Golden State Warriors, becoming only the third rookie to record at least 25 points, five rebounds and five assists in a Christmas Day game, after Oscar Robertson in 1960 and Pete Maravich in 1970.

On January 29, 2026, in a loss to the Charlotte Hornets, Flagg recorded a double-double by scoring a then-career-high 49 points, paired with 10 rebounds, three assists and a single block, tallying the then-record for the most points by a teenager in NBA history, surpassing Cliff Robinson who had scored 45 in a 1980 game. It was the highest scoring performance by a rookie since Trae Young in 2019. On February 3, Flagg put up 36 points, nine rebounds and six assists in a 110–100 loss to the Boston Celtics. He also became the first teenager to put up three consecutive 30-point games in NBA history. On April 3, Flagg put up a career-high 51 points in a 138–127 loss to the Orlando Magic. He became the youngest player in NBA history to score 50-plus points, doing so at 19 years and 103 days old and surpassing the previous record set by Brandon Jennings at 20 years and 52 days old. He also became the first teenager to score 50-plus points in a game in NBA history. On April 5, he recorded 45 points, eight rebounds and nine assists in a 134–128 win over the Los Angeles Lakers. He became the first rookie since Allen Iverson in 1997 to record back-to-back 40-point games, and reached 40 or more points for the fourth time, surpassing James for the most such games by a teenager. On April 27, it was announced that Flagg had won the Rookie of the Year award, edging out former Duke teammate Kon Knueppel by 12 more first place votes. He became the second-youngest player to win the award behind LeBron James. On May 20, Flagg was selected to the NBA All-Rookie First Team.

==== Sophomore season (2026–2027) ====
Over the offseason, Flagg's size and weight increased, it was reported during media day that Flagg had reached a new height of 6 feet 10 inches (2.08 m) and had gained a total of 23 pounds throughout the extensive offseason. In the first game of the 2026–27 season, Flagg recorded 32 points, five rebounds, and two assists in a 128–110 loss to the Houston Rockets, becoming the youngest player in NBA history to score 30+ in the opening game. In his second game of the season on October 23 against the Indiana Pacers, Flagg played 17 minutes, recording 14 points, five rebounds, and six assists. In the game, he got into a scuffle with Pacers guard Aaron Nesmith, where Nesmith committed an aggressive foul on Flagg as he attempted to go for a dunk. Flagg endured mild left shoulder sprain and sat out a game the following day while awaiting further evaluation. When Dallas played its other scheduled contest against Indiana on November 9, 2026 Flagg posted his fifth career 40+-point game, his fourth consecutive double-double and only the second 40+-point, 10+-rebound, 5+-assist game by an NBA teenager (joining Kevin Durant) with a 43-point, 10-rebound, 6-assist, 3-steal effort.

== National team career ==
Flagg played for the United States under-17 basketball team at the 2022 FIBA Under-17 Basketball World Cup. He was named to the All-Tournament Team after averaging 9.3 points, 10 rebounds, 2.9 blocked shots and 2.4 steals per game as the United States won the gold medal. Flagg scored 10 points with 17 rebounds, eight steals and four blocked shots in a 79–67 win over Spain in the final. He was named the 2022 USA Basketball Male Athlete of the Year for his performance in the Under-17 World Cup and is the youngest player to win the award.

Flagg was named to the USA Select Team to practice with the United States men's national team in preparation for the 2024 Summer Olympics.

== Career statistics ==
Legend
| GP | Games played | GS | Games started | MPG | Minutes per game |
| FG% | Field goal percentage | 3P% | 3-point field goal percentage | FT% | Free throw percentage |
| RPG | Rebounds per game | APG | Assists per game | SPG | Steals per game |
| BPG | Blocks per game | PPG | Points per game | **Bold** | Career high |

=== NBA ===
| Year | Team | GP | GS | MPG | FG% | 3P% | FT% | RPG | APG | SPG | BPG | PPG |
|---|---|---|---|---|---|---|---|---|---|---|---|---|
| 2025–26 | Dallas | 70 | 70 | 33.5 | .468 | .295 | .827 | 6.7 | 4.5 | 1.2 | .9 | 21.0 |
| Career | | 70 | 70 | 33.5 | .468 | .295 | .827 | 6.7 | 4.5 | 1.2 | .9 | 21.0 |

=== College ===
| Year | Team | GP | GS | MPG | FG% | 3P% | FT% | RPG | APG | SPG | BPG | PPG |
|---|---|---|---|---|---|---|---|---|---|---|---|---|
| 2024–25 | Duke | 37 | 37 | 30.7 | .481 | .385 | .840 | 7.5 | 4.2 | 1.4 | 1.4 | 19.2 |

== Personal life ==
Flagg's mother Kelly played college basketball at the University of Maine, where she was a team captain as a senior. His father, Ralph, played NJCAA basketball at Eastern Maine Community College. Flagg has a fraternal twin brother, Ace, who was a teammate at Nokomis, transferred to Montverde, and has since verbally committed to play at men's basketball at the University of Maine starting in 2025–26. Flagg's older brother Hunter was also a Nokomis basketball player and was a senior when the former was a freshman. His family relocated from Newport to Florida after he and his twin brother transferred to Montverde Academy.

Growing up in New England, Flagg was a fan of the Boston Celtics. Flagg is also a fan of the Japanese anime One Piece.

On September 25, 2026, Flagg's NBA Rookie Debut Patch Autograph card was sold for 8.04 million dollars through Fanatics Collect.

=== Endorsements ===
Flagg signed a shoe deal with New Balance before the start of his freshman year at Duke. Flagg's decision to choose New Balance was influenced by the company's ties to his home state of Maine, with two of their factories being located near his hometown of Newport. He also became the first men's college basketball player to be sponsored by Gatorade.

== See also ==
- List of All-Atlantic Coast Conference men's basketball teams
- List of NBA regular season records
- List of oldest and youngest NBA players
