= Peter Stroud =

American musician

- Born: Greensboro, North Carolina, U.S.
- Occupations: Musician, songwriter, amplification manufacturer
- Instrument: Guitar
- Years active: 1995–present
- Website: Official Website

Peter Stroud is a US guitarist best known for his work with Sheryl Crow, Don Henley, Pete Droge, and Sarah McLachlan. He is cofounder of 65amps, a company manufacturing guitar amplifiers.

== Biography ==
Peter Stroud was born in Greensboro, North Carolina. He was raised and received early education in Greensboro. During his high school years, he attended The Principia Upper School in St. Louis and Greensboro Day School in his hometown, graduating class 1977.

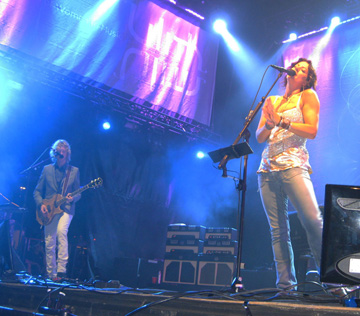
Stroud with Sarah McLachlan during Lilith Fair 2010, San Francisco, CA, photo by Laura B. Whitmore

In the mid-late 90s, Stroud played with Pete Droge. It was during this period that he met Sheryl Crow, and in late 1998 she asked him to join her band in support of her third release, Globe Sessions. This musical relationship has lasted for over eleven years, where he eventually served as Sheryl’s music director. Soon after the conclusion of the Globe Sessions tour, Peter joined Don Henley in 2000 for his Inside Job tour. Their debut concert was filmed, originally for A&E’s Live By Request, and later released on DVD.

Stroud remained active touring with Sheryl up until late June 2010, when he started touring with Sarah McLachlan's band. His last performances with Crow before moving to McLachlan were on the Lilith Fair 2010 tour, which was also his debut with McLachlan; he played with both artists for the first five dates of the tour.

In 2012 Stroud once again joined up with Sheryl Crow and besides being her lead guitar player, he also became her bandleader.

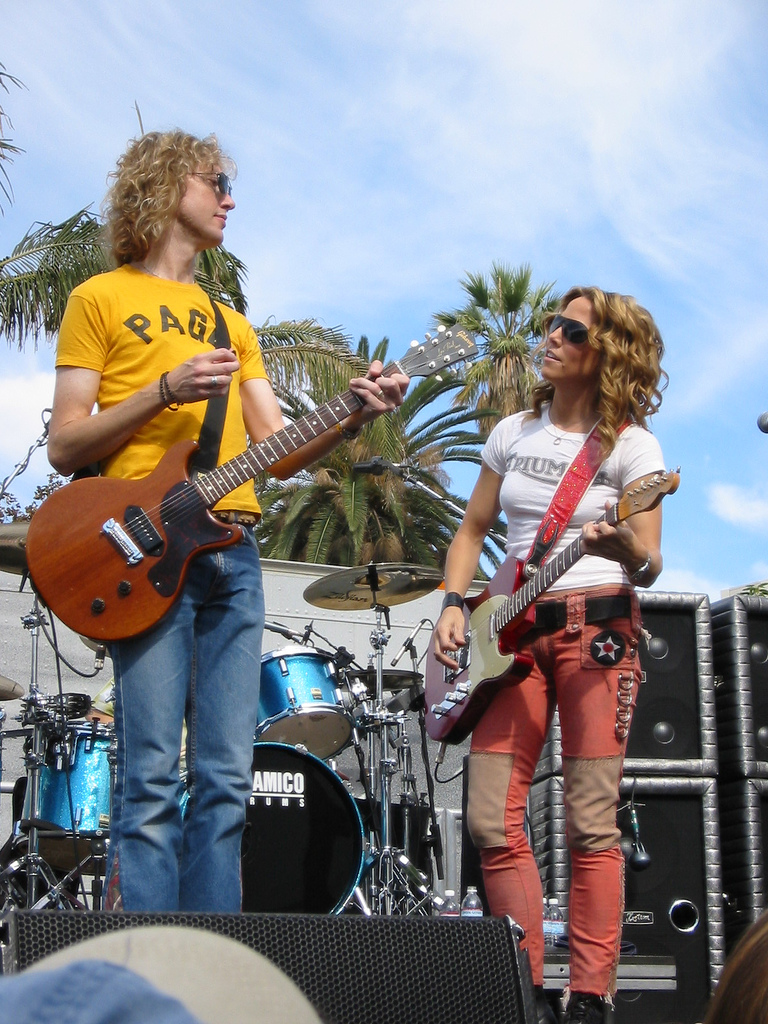
Sheryl Crow at The Grove of Los Angeles, California in 2002, with co-guitarist Peter Stroud

=== Discography ===
CDs:

- Pete Droge & The Sinners – Beautiful Girls (Movie Soundtrack and Title Song) (1996)
- Pete Droge & The Sinners – Find A Door (1996)
- Pete Droge – Spacey & Shakin’ (1998)
- Stevie Nicks – Trouble in Shangri-La (2001)
- Timeless: Hank Williams Tribute – Sheryl Crow/ Long Gone Lonesome Blues (2001)
- Sheryl Crow – C’mon C’mon (2002)
- The Dixie Chicks – Home (2002)
- Shawn Mullins – 9th Ward Pickin’ Parlor (2006)
- Shawn Mullins – Honeydew (2008)
- Michelle Malone – Debris (2009)

DVDs

- Sheryl Crow - Rockin’ The Globe (1999)
- Don Henley - Inside Job (2000)
- Sheryl Crow - C’mon America (2003)
- Sheryl Crow - Soundstage Presents: Sheryl Crow Live (recorded 2003, released 2008)
- Sheryl Crow - Wildflower Tour: Live From New York (2006)
- Crossroads: Eric Clapton Guitar Festival 2007 (performing with Sheryl Crow)
- Shawn Mullins – Live at the Variety Playhouse (2008)
