= 65amps =

American manufacturer of musical equipment

65amps is a musical equipment manufacturer, founded in 2002 (incorporated in 2004) by Dan Boul and Peter Stroud. Based in North Hollywood, CA, they manufacture hand-wired tube-powered guitar and bass amplifiers and cabinets.

== Origin of the company ==
Advances in in-ear monitor technology and the pursuant lower stage volumes led to the need for low-powered amplification solution for guitar players that still sounded as full and rich as larger tube amps. Peter Stroud and long-time friend Dan Boul developed an amp in Boul's garage that would be robust enough for Stroud's show with Sheryl Crow while he played it at low volume. The amp was first shown to the public at the NAMM Show in 2004; Boul left his employer to devote his time to 65amps full-time in 2007.

== Concept and design ==
Boul worked to expand the vocabulary of current low-wattage amps. He started with an 18-watt Marshall and a vintage Vox AC15 as his inspirations, and after much experimentation, he evolved the circuits of his amps to be more tonally versatile.

== 65amps Product Line ==
The initial product offering, dubbed the "London," made its official debut at the 2005 Winter NAMM show. Subsequently, the company added one or more new amps each year to the product line, which now includes:

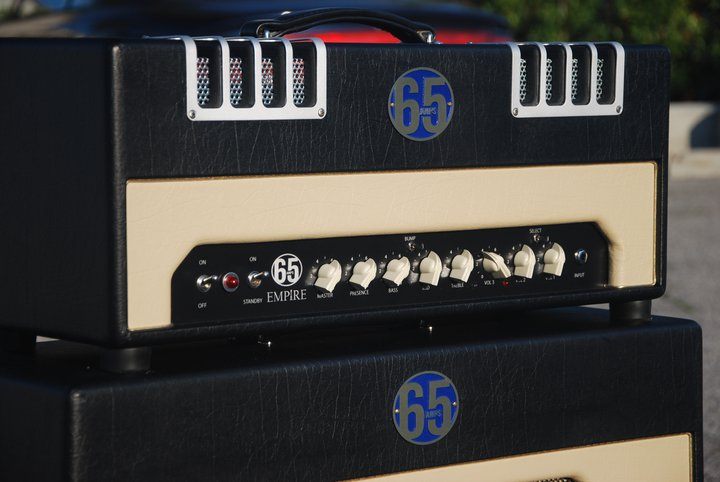
Empire

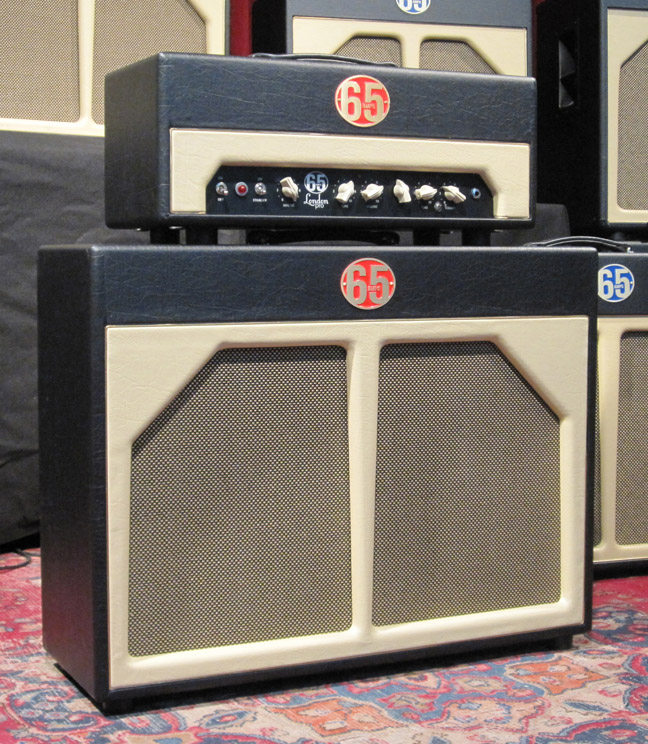
London Pro

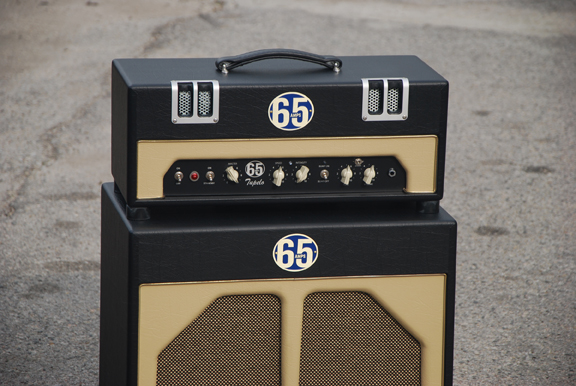
Tupelo

=== Guitar amps ===
- Tupelo - Handwired 20 watt, solid state rectifier, 2 x 6V6 power section, head or combo; it aims to replicate the classic American circuitry of the late 1950s and early-to-mid-1960s. Released January, 2010.
- London - Handwired 18 watt, tube rectified, 2 x EL84 power section, 12AX7, EF86, tremolo. The London offers 2-amps-in-one. Released January, 2005.
- Marquee Club - 35Watt (4 x EL84), tube rectified, 3 x 12AX7, two channels. 65 Amps second model introduced after the London. One 12AX7 is in a "cascode" circuit instead of using an EF86 as was used in the London. It is a bigger sounding, louder version of the London in some respects, endowed with great headroom and presence.
- Stone Pony - 25 or 50 Watt (2x7591), tube rectified, EF86-12AX7 cathode follower. Employs an EF86 preamp tube feeding a 12AX7 phase inverter. Released January 2008
- SoHo - 20 watt (2 x EL84) or 35 watt (4 x 7591), Tube rectified, EF86-12AX7 cathode follower. Released January 2007.

=== Bass amps ===
- Apollo - 50 Watt tube bass head and 1x15 cabinet. Winner of Bass Gear's Outstanding Amp for 2009 Award. Apollo features a 3-way “Pad” switch that adjusts the input levels to accommodate modern basses with active electronics. Released January, 2010
