= Nokomis Regional High School =

Secondary school in Maine, United States

Nokomis Regional High

Location
- 291 Williams Rd. Suite 2 Newport, Maine 04953; United States; 44°52′37″N 69°17′41″W

Information
- Type: Public High School
- Motto: "Inspire every student. Instill a motivation for learning. Insure contributing citizens."
- Established: 1968
- School district: RSU#19
- Principal: Wayne Prescott
- Teaching staff: 45.80 (on an FTE basis)
- Grades: 9–12
- Enrollment: 610 (2024–2025)
- Student to teacher ratio: 13.32
- Colors: Burgundy and White
- Mascot: Warrior
- Website: www.rsu19.org/o/nokomis

Nokomis Regional High is a secondary school located in Newport, Maine, United States. Nokomis is a public school which accepts students from Newport, Corinna, Palmyra, Hartland, St. Albans, Plymouth, Etna and Dixmont

The school principal is Wayne Prescott . The school mascot is the Warrior, and the sports team name is "Nokomis Warriors".

== Notable alumni ==
- Dean Cray, State Legislator
- Cooper Flagg, basketball player (transferred out after freshman year)
- Aaron Frey, Maine Attorney General
- Josh Tardy, State Legislator
